= Wisconsin's congressional delegations =

Wisconsin's congressional districts since 2023

These are tables of congressional delegations from Wisconsin to the United States House of Representatives and the United States Senate.

The current dean of the Wisconsin delegation is Senator Tammy Baldwin (D), having served in the Senate since 2013 and in Congress since 1999.

== U.S. House of Representatives ==
=== Current members ===
List of members, their terms in office, district boundaries, and the district political ratings according to the Cook Partisan Voting Index (CPVI). The delegation has a total of 8 members, including 6 Republicans and 2 Democrats.

District	Representative	Party	CPVI	Incumbency	District map
1st	Bryan Steil (Janesville)	Republican	R+2	January 3, 2019 – present	
2nd	Mark Pocan (Vermont)	Democratic	D+21	January 3, 2013 – present	
3rd	Derrick Van Orden (Prairie du Chien)	Republican	R+3	January 3, 2023 – present	
4th	Gwen Moore (Milwaukee)	Democratic	D+26	January 3, 2005 – present	
5th	Scott Fitzgerald (Clyman)	Republican	R+11	January 3, 2021 – present	
6th	Glenn Grothman (Glenbeaulah)	Republican	R+8	January 3, 2015 – present	
7th	Tom Tiffany (Minocqua)	Republican	R+11	May 12, 2020 – present	
8th	Tony Wied (De Pere)	Republican	R+8	November 5, 2024 – present	

=== Delegates from Wisconsin Territory ===
Congress	Delegate
24th (1835–1837)	George Wallace Jones (D)
25th (1837–1839)	George Wallace Jones (D)
25th (1837–1839)	James Duane Doty (D)
26th (1839–1841)	James Duane Doty (D)
27th (1841–1843)	Henry Dodge (D)
28th (1843–1845)	Henry Dodge (D)
29th (1845–1847)	Morgan Lewis Martin (D)
30th (1847–1849)	John Hubbard Tweedy (W)
30th (1847–1849)	Henry Hastings Sibley (D)

=== United States representatives ===
==== 1847–1849 ====
Congress	1st district	2nd district
30th (1847–1849)	William Pitt Lynde (D)	Mason C. Darling (D)

==== 1849–1863 ====
Congress	District		
Congress	1st	2nd	3rd
31st (1849–1851)	Charles Durkee (FS)	Orsamus Cole (W)	James Duane; Doty (D)
32nd (1851–1853)	Charles Durkee (FS)	Ben C. Eastman (D)	James Duane; Doty (D)
33rd (1853–1855)	Daniel; Wells Jr. (D)	Ben C. Eastman (D)	John B. Macy (D)
34th (1855–1857)	Daniel; Wells Jr. (D)	Cadwallader C. Washburn (R)	Charles; Billinghurst (R)
35th (1857–1859)	John F. Potter (R)	Cadwallader C. Washburn (R)	Charles; Billinghurst (R)
36th (1859–1861)	John F. Potter (R)	Cadwallader C. Washburn (R)	Charles H. Larrabee (D)
37th (1861–1863)	John F. Potter (R)	Luther Hanchett (R)	A. Scott Sloan (R)
37th (1861–1863)	John F. Potter (R)	Walter D. McIndoe (R)	A. Scott Sloan (R)

==== 1863–1873 ====
Congress	District					
Congress	1st	2nd	3rd	4th	5th	6th
38th (1863–1865)	James S. Brown (D)	Ithamar Sloan (R)	Amasa; Cobb (R)	Charles A. Eldredge (D)	Ezra Wheeler (D)	Walter D. McIndoe (R)
39th (1865–1867)	Halbert E. Paine (R)	Ithamar Sloan (R)	Amasa; Cobb (R)	Charles A. Eldredge (D)	Philetus; Sawyer (R)	Walter D. McIndoe (R)
40th (1867–1869)	Halbert E. Paine (R)	Benjamin F. Hopkins (R)	Amasa; Cobb (R)	Charles A. Eldredge (D)	Philetus; Sawyer (R)	Chadwallader C. Washburn (R)
41st (1869–1871)	Halbert E. Paine (R)	Benjamin F. Hopkins (R)	Amasa; Cobb (R)	Charles A. Eldredge (D)	Philetus; Sawyer (R)	Chadwallader C. Washburn (R)
41st (1869–1871)	Halbert E. Paine (R)	David Atwood (R)	Amasa; Cobb (R)	Charles A. Eldredge (D)	Philetus; Sawyer (R)	Chadwallader C. Washburn (R)
42nd (1871–1873)	Alexander; Mitchell (D)	Gerry Whiting; Hazleton (R)	J. Allen; Barber (R)	Charles A. Eldredge (D)	Philetus; Sawyer (R)	Jeremiah M. Rusk (R)

==== 1873–1883 ====
Congress	District							
Congress	1st	2nd	3rd	4th	5th	6th	7th	8th
43rd (1873–1875)	Charles G. Williams (R)	Gerry Whiting; Hazleton (R)	J. Allen Barber (R)	Alexander; Mitchell (D)	Charles A. Eldredge (D)	Philetus Sawyer (R)	Jeremiah M. Rusk (R)	Alexander S. McDill (R)
44th (1875–1877)	Charles G. Williams (R)	Lucien B. Caswell (R)	Henry S. Magoon (R)	William Pitt; Lynde (D)	Samuel D. Burchard (D)	Alanson M. Kimball (R)	Jeremiah M. Rusk (R)	George W. Cate (D)
45th (1877–1879)	Charles G. Williams (R)	Lucien B. Caswell (R)	George Cochrane; Hazelton (R)	William Pitt; Lynde (D)	Edward S. Bragg (D)	Gabriel Bouck (D)	Herman L. Humphrey (R)	Thaddeus C. Pound (R)
46th (1879–1881)	Charles G. Williams (R)	Lucien B. Caswell (R)	George Cochrane; Hazelton (R)	Peter V. Deuster (D)	Edward S. Bragg (D)	Gabriel Bouck (D)	Herman L. Humphrey (R)	Thaddeus C. Pound (R)
47th (1881–1883)	Charles G. Williams (R)	Lucien B. Caswell (R)	George Cochrane; Hazelton (R)	Peter V. Deuster (D)	Edward S. Bragg (D)	Richard W. Guenther (R)	Herman L. Humphrey (R)	Thaddeus C. Pound (R)

==== 1883–1893 ====
Congress	District								
Congress	1st	2nd	3rd	4th	5th	6th	7th	8th	9th
48th (1883–1885)	John Winans (D)	Daniel H. Sumner (D)	Burr W. Jones (D)	Peter V. Deuster (D)	Joseph Rankin (D)	Richard W. Guenther (R)	Gilbert M. Woodward (D)	William T. Price (R)	Isaac; Stephenson (R)
49th (1885–1887)	Lucien B. Caswell (R)	Edward S. Bragg (D)	Robert M. La Follette (R)	Isaac W. Van Schaick (R)	Joseph Rankin (D)	Richard W. Guenther (R)	Ormsby B. Thomas (R)	William T. Price (R)	Isaac; Stephenson (R)
49th (1885–1887)	Lucien B. Caswell (R)	Edward S. Bragg (D)	Robert M. La Follette (R)	Isaac W. Van Schaick (R)	Thomas R. Hudd (D)	Richard W. Guenther (R)	Ormsby B. Thomas (R)	Hugh H. Price (R)	Isaac; Stephenson (R)
50th (1887–1889)	Lucien B. Caswell (R)	Richard W. Guenther (R)	Robert M. La Follette (R)	Henry Smith (Labor)	Thomas R. Hudd (D)	Charles B. Clark (R)	Ormsby B. Thomas (R)	Nils P. Haugen (R)	Isaac; Stephenson (R)
51st (1889–1891)	Lucien B. Caswell (R)	Charles Barwig (D)	Robert M. La Follette (R)	Isaac W. Van Schaick (R)	George H. Brickner (D)	Charles B. Clark (R)	Ormsby B. Thomas (R)	Nils P. Haugen (R)	Myron H. McCord (R)
52nd (1891–1893)	Clinton Babbitt (D)	Charles Barwig (D)	Allen R. Bushnell (D)	John L. Mitchell (D)	George H. Brickner (D)	Lucas M. Miller (D)	Frank P. Coburn (D)	Nils P. Haugen (R)	Thomas Lynch (D)

==== 1893–1903 ====
Congress	District									
Congress	1st	2nd	3rd	4th	5th	6th	7th	8th	9th	10th
53rd (1893–1895)	Henry Allen; Cooper (R)	Charles; Barwig (D)	Joseph W. Babcock (R)	Peter J. Somers (D)	George H. Brickner (D)	Owen A. Wells (D)	George B. Shaw (R)	Lyman E. Barnes (D)	Thomas Lynch (D)	Nils P. Haugen (R)
53rd (1893–1895)	Henry Allen; Cooper (R)	Charles; Barwig (D)	Joseph W. Babcock (R)	Peter J. Somers (D)	George H. Brickner (D)	Owen A. Wells (D)	Michael Griffin (R)	Lyman E. Barnes (D)	Thomas Lynch (D)	Nils P. Haugen (R)
54th (1895–1897)	Henry Allen; Cooper (R)	Edward; Sauerhering (R)	Joseph W. Babcock (R)	Theobald; Otjen (R)	Samuel S. Barney (R)	Samuel A. Cook (R)	Michael Griffin (R)	Edward S. Minor (R)	Alexander; Stewart (R)	John J. Jenkins (R)
55th (1897–1899)	Henry Allen; Cooper (R)	Edward; Sauerhering (R)	Joseph W. Babcock (R)	Theobald; Otjen (R)	Samuel S. Barney (R)	James H. Davidson (R)	Michael Griffin (R)	Edward S. Minor (R)	Alexander; Stewart (R)	John J. Jenkins (R)
56th (1899–1901)	Henry Allen; Cooper (R)	Herman; Dahle (R)	Joseph W. Babcock (R)	Theobald; Otjen (R)	Samuel S. Barney (R)	James H. Davidson (R)	John J. Esch (R)	Edward S. Minor (R)	Alexander; Stewart (R)	John J. Jenkins (R)
57th (1901–1903)	Henry Allen; Cooper (R)	Herman; Dahle (R)	Joseph W. Babcock (R)	Theobald; Otjen (R)	Samuel S. Barney (R)	James H. Davidson (R)	John J. Esch (R)	Edward S. Minor (R)	Webster E. Brown (R)	John J. Jenkins (R)

==== 1903–1933 ====
Congress	District										
Congress	1st	2nd	3rd	4th	5th	6th	7th	8th	9th	10th	11th
58th (1903–1905)	Henry Allen; Cooper (R)	Henry C. Adams (R)	Joseph W. Babcock (R)	Theobald; Otjen (R)	William H. Stafford (R)	Charles H. Weisse (D)	John J. Esch (R)	James H. Davidson (R)	Edward S. Minor (R)	Webster E. Brown (R)	John J. Jenkins (R)
59th (1905–1907)	Henry Allen; Cooper (R)	Henry C. Adams (R)	Joseph W. Babcock (R)	Theobald; Otjen (R)	William H. Stafford (R)	Charles H. Weisse (D)	John J. Esch (R)	James H. Davidson (R)	Edward S. Minor (R)	Webster E. Brown (R)	John J. Jenkins (R)
59th (1905–1907)	Henry Allen; Cooper (R)	John M. Nelson (R)	Joseph W. Babcock (R)	Theobald; Otjen (R)	William H. Stafford (R)	Charles H. Weisse (D)	John J. Esch (R)	James H. Davidson (R)	Edward S. Minor (R)	Webster E. Brown (R)	John J. Jenkins (R)
60th (1907–1909)	Henry Allen; Cooper (R)	John M. Nelson (R)	James W. Murphy (D)	William J. Cary (R)	William H. Stafford (R)	Charles H. Weisse (D)	John J. Esch (R)	James H. Davidson (R)	Gustav; Küstermann (R)	Elmer A. Morse (R)	John J. Jenkins (R)
61st (1909–1911)	Henry Allen; Cooper (R)	John M. Nelson (R)	Arthur W. Kopp (R)	William J. Cary (R)	William H. Stafford (R)	Charles H. Weisse (D)	John J. Esch (R)	James H. Davidson (R)	Gustav; Küstermann (R)	Elmer A. Morse (R)	Irvine; Lenroot (R)
62nd (1911–1913)	Henry Allen; Cooper (R)	John M. Nelson (R)	Arthur W. Kopp (R)	William J. Cary (R)	Victor L. Berger (Soc)	Michael E. Burke (D)	John J. Esch (R)	James H. Davidson (R)	Thomas F. Konop (D)	Elmer A. Morse (R)	Irvine; Lenroot (R)
63rd (1913–1915)	Henry Allen; Cooper (R)	Michael E. Burke (D)	John M. Nelson (R)	William J. Cary (R)	William H. Stafford (R)	Michael; Reilly (D)	John J. Esch (R)	Edward E. Browne (R)	Thomas F. Konop (D)	James A. Frear (R)	Irvine; Lenroot (R)
64th (1915–1917)	Henry Allen; Cooper (R)	Michael E. Burke (D)	John M. Nelson (R)	William J. Cary (R)	William H. Stafford (R)	Michael; Reilly (D)	John J. Esch (R)	Edward E. Browne (R)	Thomas F. Konop (D)	James A. Frear (R)	Irvine; Lenroot (R)
65th (1917–1919)	Henry Allen; Cooper (R)	Edward; Voight (R)	John M. Nelson (R)	William J. Cary (R)	William H. Stafford (R)	J. H. Davidson (R)	John J. Esch (R)	Edward E. Browne (R)	David G. Classon (R)	James A. Frear (R)	Irvine; Lenroot (R)
65th (1917–1919)	Henry Allen; Cooper (R)	Edward; Voight (R)	John M. Nelson (R)	William J. Cary (R)	William H. Stafford (R)	Florian; Lampert (R)	John J. Esch (R)	Edward E. Browne (R)	David G. Classon (R)	James A. Frear (R)	Adolphus P. Nelson (R)
66th (1919–1921)	Clifford E. Randall (R)	Edward; Voight (R)	James G. Monahan (R)	John C. Kleczka (R)	Victor L. Berger (Soc)	Florian; Lampert (R)	John J. Esch (R)	Edward E. Browne (R)	David G. Classon (R)	James A. Frear (R)	Adolphus P. Nelson (R)
67th (1921–1923)	Henry Allen; Cooper (R)	Edward; Voight (R)	John M. Nelson (R)	John C. Kleczka (R)	William H. Stafford (R)	Florian; Lampert (R)	Joseph D. Beck (R)	Edward E. Browne (R)	David G. Classon (R)	James A. Frear (R)	Adolphus P. Nelson (R)
68th (1923–1925)	Henry Allen; Cooper (R)	Edward; Voight (R)	John M. Nelson (R)	John C. Schafer (R)	Victor L. Berger (Soc)	Florian; Lampert (R)	Joseph D. Beck (R)	Edward E. Browne (R)	George J. Schneider (R)	James A. Frear (R)	Hubert H. Peavey (R)
69th (1925–1927)	Henry Allen; Cooper (R)	Edward; Voight (R)	John M. Nelson (R)	John C. Schafer (R)	Victor L. Berger (Soc)	Florian; Lampert (R)	Joseph D. Beck (R)	Edward E. Browne (R)	George J. Schneider (R)	James A. Frear (R)	Hubert H. Peavey (R)
70th (1927–1929)	Henry Allen; Cooper (R)	Charles A. Kading (R)	John M. Nelson (R)	John C. Schafer (R)	Victor L. Berger (Soc)	Florian; Lampert (R)	Joseph D. Beck (R)	Edward E. Browne (R)	George J. Schneider (R)	James A. Frear (R)	Hubert H. Peavey (R)
71st (1929–1931)	Henry Allen; Cooper (R)	Charles A. Kading (R)	John M. Nelson (R)	John C. Schafer (R)	William H. Stafford (R)	Florian; Lampert (R)	Merlin Hull (R)	Edward E. Browne (R)	George J. Schneider (R)	James A. Frear (R)	Hubert H. Peavey (R)
71st (1929–1931)	Henry Allen; Cooper (R)	Charles A. Kading (R)	John M. Nelson (R)	John C. Schafer (R)	William H. Stafford (R)	Michael; Reilly (D)	Merlin Hull (R)	Edward E. Browne (R)	George J. Schneider (R)	James A. Frear (R)	Hubert H. Peavey (R)
72nd (1931–1933)	Henry Allen; Cooper (R)	Charles A. Kading (R)	John M. Nelson (R)	John C. Schafer (R)	William H. Stafford (R)	Michael; Reilly (D)	Gardner R. Winthrow (R)	Gerald J. Boileau (R)	George J. Schneider (R)	James A. Frear (R)	Hubert H. Peavey (R)
72nd (1931–1933)	Thomas R. Amlie (R)	Charles A. Kading (R)	John M. Nelson (R)	John C. Schafer (R)	William H. Stafford (R)	Michael; Reilly (D)	Gardner R. Winthrow (R)	Gerald J. Boileau (R)	George J. Schneider (R)	James A. Frear (R)	Hubert H. Peavey (R)

==== 1933–present ====
Congress	District									
Congress	1st	2nd	3rd	4th	5th	6th	7th	8th	9th	10th
73rd (1933–1935)	George W. Blanchard (R)	Charles W. Henney (D)	Gardner R. Winthrow (R)	Raymond J. Cannon (D)	Thomas; O'Malley (D)	Michael; Reilly (D)	Gerald J. Boileau (R)	James F. Hughes (D)	James A. Frear (R)	Hubert H. Peavey (R)
74th (1935–1937)	Thomas R. Amlie (Prog)	Henry; Sauthoff (Prog)	Gardner R. Winthrow (Prog)	Raymond J. Cannon (D)	Thomas; O'Malley (D)	Michael; Reilly (D)	Gerald J. Boileau (Prog)	George J. Schneider (Prog)	Merlin; Hull (Prog)	Bernard J. Gehrmann (Prog)
75th (1937–1939)	Thomas R. Amlie (Prog)	Henry; Sauthoff (Prog)	Gardner R. Winthrow (Prog)	Raymond J. Cannon (D)	Thomas; O'Malley (D)	Michael; Reilly (D)	Gerald J. Boileau (Prog)	George J. Schneider (Prog)	Merlin; Hull (Prog)	Bernard J. Gehrmann (Prog)
76th (1939–1941)	Stephen; Bolles (R)	Charles; Hawks Jr. (R)	Harry W. Griswold (R)	John C. Schafer (R)	Lewis D. Thill (R)	Frank B. Keefe (R)	Reid F. Murray (R)	Joshua L. Johns (R)	Merlin; Hull (Prog)	Bernard J. Gehrmann (Prog)
77th (1941–1943)	Stephen; Bolles (R)	Harry; Sauthoff (Prog)	William H. Stevenson (R)	Thad F. Wasielewski (D)	Lewis D. Thill (R)	Frank B. Keefe (R)	Reid F. Murray (R)	Joshua L. Johns (R)	Merlin; Hull (Prog)	Bernard J. Gehrmann (Prog)
77th (1941–1943)	Lawrence H. Smith (R)	Harry; Sauthoff (Prog)	William H. Stevenson (R)	Thad F. Wasielewski (D)	Lewis D. Thill (R)	Frank B. Keefe (R)	Reid F. Murray (R)	Joshua L. Johns (R)	Merlin; Hull (Prog)	Bernard J. Gehrmann (Prog)
78th (1943–1945)	Lawrence H. Smith (R)	Harry; Sauthoff (Prog)	William H. Stevenson (R)	Thad F. Wasielewski (D)	Howard J. McMurray (D)	Frank B. Keefe (R)	Reid F. Murray (R)	LaVern; Dilweg (D)	Merlin; Hull (Prog)	Alvin; O'Konski (R)
79th (1945–1947)	Lawrence H. Smith (R)	Robert K. Henry (R)	William H. Stevenson (R)	Thad F. Wasielewski (D)	Andrew; Biemiller (D)	Frank B. Keefe (R)	Reid F. Murray (R)	John W. Byrnes (R)	Merlin; Hull (Prog)	Alvin; O'Konski (R)
80th (1947–1949)	Lawrence H. Smith (R)	Glenn R. Davis (R)	William H. Stevenson (R)	John C. Brophy (R)	Charles J. Kersten (R)	Frank B. Keefe (R)	Reid F. Murray (R)	John W. Byrnes (R)	Merlin; Hull (R)	Alvin; O'Konski (R)
81st (1949–1951)	Lawrence H. Smith (R)	Glenn R. Davis (R)	Gardner R. Winthrow (R)	Clement; Zablocki (D)	Andrew; Biemiller (D)	Frank B. Keefe (R)	Reid F. Murray (R)	John W. Byrnes (R)	Merlin; Hull (R)	Alvin; O'Konski (R)
82nd (1951–1953)	Lawrence H. Smith (R)	Glenn R. Davis (R)	Gardner R. Winthrow (R)	Clement; Zablocki (D)	Charles J. Kersten (R)	William; Van Pelt (R)	Reid F. Murray (R)	John W. Byrnes (R)	Merlin; Hull (R)	Alvin; O'Konski (R)
83rd (1953–1955)	Lawrence H. Smith (R)	Glenn R. Davis (R)	Gardner R. Winthrow (R)	Clement; Zablocki (D)	Charles J. Kersten (R)	William; Van Pelt (R)	Melvin; Laird (R)	John W. Byrnes (R)	Merlin; Hull (R)	Alvin; O'Konski (R)
83rd (1953–1955)	Lawrence H. Smith (R)	Glenn R. Davis (R)	Gardner R. Winthrow (R)	Clement; Zablocki (D)	Charles J. Kersten (R)	William; Van Pelt (R)	Melvin; Laird (R)	John W. Byrnes (R)	Lester; Johnson (D)	Alvin; O'Konski (R)
84th (1955–1957)	Lawrence H. Smith (R)	Glenn R. Davis (R)	Gardner R. Winthrow (R)	Clement; Zablocki (D)	Henry S. Reuss (D)	William; Van Pelt (R)	Melvin; Laird (R)	John W. Byrnes (R)	Lester; Johnson (D)	Alvin; O'Konski (R)
85th (1957–1959)	Lawrence H. Smith (R)	Donald E. Tewes (R)	Gardner R. Winthrow (R)	Clement; Zablocki (D)	Henry S. Reuss (D)	William; Van Pelt (R)	Melvin; Laird (R)	John W. Byrnes (R)	Lester; Johnson (D)	Alvin; O'Konski (R)
86th (1959–1961)	Gerald T. Flynn (D)	Robert; Kastenmeier (D)	Gardner R. Winthrow (R)	Clement; Zablocki (D)	Henry S. Reuss (D)	William; Van Pelt (R)	Melvin; Laird (R)	John W. Byrnes (R)	Lester; Johnson (D)	Alvin; O'Konski (R)
87th (1961–1963)	Henry C. Schadeberg (R)	Robert; Kastenmeier (D)	Vernon W. Thomson (R)	Clement; Zablocki (D)	Henry S. Reuss (D)	William; Van Pelt (R)	Melvin; Laird (R)	John W. Byrnes (R)	Lester; Johnson (D)	Alvin; O'Konski (R)
88th (1963–1965)	Henry C. Schadeberg (R)	Robert; Kastenmeier (D)	Vernon W. Thomson (R)	Clement; Zablocki (D)	Henry S. Reuss (D)	William; Van Pelt (R)	Melvin; Laird (R)	John W. Byrnes (R)	Lester; Johnson (D)	Alvin; O'Konski (R)
89th (1965–1967)	Lynn E. Stalbaum (D)	Robert; Kastenmeier (D)	Vernon W. Thomson (R)	Clement; Zablocki (D)	Henry S. Reuss (D)	John A. Race (D)	Melvin; Laird (R)	John W. Byrnes (R)	Glenn R. Davis (R)	Alvin; O'Konski (R)
90th (1967–1969)	Henry C. Schadeberg (R)	Robert; Kastenmeier (D)	Vernon W. Thomson (R)	Clement; Zablocki (D)	Henry S. Reuss (D)	William A. Steiger (R)	Melvin; Laird (R)	John W. Byrnes (R)	Glenn R. Davis (R)	Alvin; O'Konski (R)
91st (1969–1971)	Henry C. Schadeberg (R)	Robert; Kastenmeier (D)	Vernon W. Thomson (R)	Clement; Zablocki (D)	Henry S. Reuss (D)	William A. Steiger (R)	Melvin; Laird (R)	John W. Byrnes (R)	Glenn R. Davis (R)	Alvin; O'Konski (R)
91st (1969–1971)	Henry C. Schadeberg (R)	Robert; Kastenmeier (D)	Vernon W. Thomson (R)	Clement; Zablocki (D)	Henry S. Reuss (D)	William A. Steiger (R)	Dave; Obey (D)	John W. Byrnes (R)	Glenn R. Davis (R)	Alvin; O'Konski (R)
92nd (1971–1973)	Les; Aspin (D)	Robert; Kastenmeier (D)	Vernon W. Thomson (R)	Clement; Zablocki (D)	Henry S. Reuss (D)	William A. Steiger (R)	Dave; Obey (D)	John W. Byrnes (R)	Glenn R. Davis (R)	Alvin; O'Konski (R)
93rd (1973–1975)	Les; Aspin (D)	Robert; Kastenmeier (D)	Vernon W. Thomson (R)	Clement; Zablocki (D)	Henry S. Reuss (D)	William A. Steiger (R)	Dave; Obey (D)	Harold V. Froehlich (R)	Glenn R. Davis (R)	
94th (1975–1977)	Les; Aspin (D)	Robert; Kastenmeier (D)	Alvin; Baldus (D)	Clement; Zablocki (D)	Henry S. Reuss (D)	William A. Steiger (R)	Dave; Obey (D)	Robert J. Cornell (D)	Bob; Kasten (R)	
95th (1977–1979)	Les; Aspin (D)	Robert; Kastenmeier (D)	Alvin; Baldus (D)	Clement; Zablocki (D)	Henry S. Reuss (D)	William A. Steiger (R)	Dave; Obey (D)	Robert J. Cornell (D)	Bob; Kasten (R)	
96th (1979–1981)	Les; Aspin (D)	Robert; Kastenmeier (D)	Alvin; Baldus (D)	Clement; Zablocki (D)	Henry S. Reuss (D)	Tom; Petri (R)	Dave; Obey (D)	Toby; Roth (R)	Jim; Sensenbrenner (R)	
97th (1981–1983)	Les; Aspin (D)	Robert; Kastenmeier (D)	Steve; Gunderson (R)	Clement; Zablocki (D)	Henry S. Reuss (D)	Tom; Petri (R)	Dave; Obey (D)	Toby; Roth (R)	Jim; Sensenbrenner (R)	
98th (1983–1985)	Les; Aspin (D)	Robert; Kastenmeier (D)	Steve; Gunderson (R)	Clement; Zablocki (D)	Jim; Moody (D)	Tom; Petri (R)	Dave; Obey (D)	Toby; Roth (R)	Jim; Sensenbrenner (R)	
98th (1983–1985)	Les; Aspin (D)	Robert; Kastenmeier (D)	Steve; Gunderson (R)	Jerry; Kleczka (D)	Jim; Moody (D)	Tom; Petri (R)	Dave; Obey (D)	Toby; Roth (R)	Jim; Sensenbrenner (R)	
99th (1985–1987)	Les; Aspin (D)	Robert; Kastenmeier (D)	Steve; Gunderson (R)	Jerry; Kleczka (D)	Jim; Moody (D)	Tom; Petri (R)	Dave; Obey (D)	Toby; Roth (R)	Jim; Sensenbrenner (R)	
100th (1987–1989)	Les; Aspin (D)	Robert; Kastenmeier (D)	Steve; Gunderson (R)	Jerry; Kleczka (D)	Jim; Moody (D)	Tom; Petri (R)	Dave; Obey (D)	Toby; Roth (R)	Jim; Sensenbrenner (R)	
101st (1989–1991)	Les; Aspin (D)	Robert; Kastenmeier (D)	Steve; Gunderson (R)	Jerry; Kleczka (D)	Jim; Moody (D)	Tom; Petri (R)	Dave; Obey (D)	Toby; Roth (R)	Jim; Sensenbrenner (R)	
102nd (1991–1993)	Les; Aspin (D)	Scott; Klug (R)	Steve; Gunderson (R)	Jerry; Kleczka (D)	Jim; Moody (D)	Tom; Petri (R)	Dave; Obey (D)	Toby; Roth (R)	Jim; Sensenbrenner (R)	
103rd (1993–1995)	Les; Aspin (D)	Scott; Klug (R)	Steve; Gunderson (R)	Jerry; Kleczka (D)	Tom; Barrett (D)	Tom; Petri (R)	Dave; Obey (D)	Toby; Roth (R)	Jim; Sensenbrenner (R)	
103rd (1993–1995)	Peter Barca (D)	Scott; Klug (R)	Steve; Gunderson (R)	Jerry; Kleczka (D)	Tom; Barrett (D)	Tom; Petri (R)	Dave; Obey (D)	Toby; Roth (R)	Jim; Sensenbrenner (R)	
104th (1995–1997)	Mark; Neumann (R)	Scott; Klug (R)	Steve; Gunderson (R)	Jerry; Kleczka (D)	Tom; Barrett (D)	Tom; Petri (R)	Dave; Obey (D)	Toby; Roth (R)	Jim; Sensenbrenner (R)	
105th (1997–1999)	Mark; Neumann (R)	Scott; Klug (R)	Ron; Kind (D)	Jerry; Kleczka (D)	Tom; Barrett (D)	Tom; Petri (R)	Dave; Obey (D)	Jay Johnson (D)	Jim; Sensenbrenner (R)	
106th (1999–2001)	Paul Ryan (R)	Tammy; Baldwin (D)	Ron; Kind (D)	Jerry; Kleczka (D)	Tom; Barrett (D)	Tom; Petri (R)	Dave; Obey (D)	Mark Green (R)	Jim; Sensenbrenner (R)	
107th (2001–2003)	Paul Ryan (R)	Tammy; Baldwin (D)	Ron; Kind (D)	Jerry; Kleczka (D)	Tom; Barrett (D)	Tom; Petri (R)	Dave; Obey (D)	Mark Green (R)	Jim; Sensenbrenner (R)	
108th (2003–2005)	Paul Ryan (R)	Tammy; Baldwin (D)	Ron; Kind (D)	Jerry; Kleczka (D)	Jim; Sensenbrenner (R)	Tom; Petri (R)	Dave; Obey (D)	Mark Green (R)		
109th (2005–2007)	Paul Ryan (R)	Tammy; Baldwin (D)	Ron; Kind (D)	Gwen; Moore (D)	Jim; Sensenbrenner (R)	Tom; Petri (R)	Dave; Obey (D)	Mark Green (R)		
110th (2007–2009)	Paul Ryan (R)	Tammy; Baldwin (D)	Ron; Kind (D)	Gwen; Moore (D)	Jim; Sensenbrenner (R)	Tom; Petri (R)	Dave; Obey (D)	Steve; Kagen (D)		
111th (2009–2011)	Paul Ryan (R)	Tammy; Baldwin (D)	Ron; Kind (D)	Gwen; Moore (D)	Jim; Sensenbrenner (R)	Tom; Petri (R)	Dave; Obey (D)	Steve; Kagen (D)		
112th (2011–2013)	Paul Ryan (R)	Tammy; Baldwin (D)	Ron; Kind (D)	Gwen; Moore (D)	Jim; Sensenbrenner (R)	Tom; Petri (R)	Sean; Duffy (R)	Reid; Ribble (R)		
113th (2013–2015)	Paul Ryan (R)	Mark; Pocan (D)	Ron; Kind (D)	Gwen; Moore (D)	Jim; Sensenbrenner (R)	Tom; Petri (R)	Sean; Duffy (R)	Reid; Ribble (R)		
114th (2015–2017)	Paul Ryan (R)	Mark; Pocan (D)	Ron; Kind (D)	Gwen; Moore (D)	Jim; Sensenbrenner (R)	Glenn; Grothman (R)	Sean; Duffy (R)	Reid; Ribble (R)		
115th (2017–2019)	Paul Ryan (R)	Mark; Pocan (D)	Ron; Kind (D)	Gwen; Moore (D)	Jim; Sensenbrenner (R)	Glenn; Grothman (R)	Sean; Duffy (R)	Mike; Gallagher (R)		
116th (2019–2021)	Bryan; Steil (R)	Mark; Pocan (D)	Ron; Kind (D)	Gwen; Moore (D)	Jim; Sensenbrenner (R)	Glenn; Grothman (R)	Sean; Duffy (R)	Mike; Gallagher (R)		
116th (2019–2021)	Bryan; Steil (R)	Mark; Pocan (D)	Ron; Kind (D)	Gwen; Moore (D)	Jim; Sensenbrenner (R)	Glenn; Grothman (R)	Tom; Tiffany (R)	Mike; Gallagher (R)		
117th (2021–2023)	Bryan; Steil (R)	Mark; Pocan (D)	Ron; Kind (D)	Gwen; Moore (D)	Scott; Fitzgerald (R)	Glenn; Grothman (R)	Tom; Tiffany (R)	Mike; Gallagher (R)		
118th (2023–2025)	Bryan; Steil (R)	Mark; Pocan (D)	Derrick; Van Orden (R)	Gwen; Moore (D)	Scott; Fitzgerald (R)	Glenn; Grothman (R)	Tom; Tiffany (R)	Mike; Gallagher (R)		
118th (2023–2025)	Bryan; Steil (R)	Mark; Pocan (D)	Derrick; Van Orden (R)	Gwen; Moore (D)	Scott; Fitzgerald (R)	Glenn; Grothman (R)	Tom; Tiffany (R)	Tony; Wied (R)		
119th (2025–2027)	Bryan; Steil (R)	Mark; Pocan (D)	Derrick; Van Orden (R)	Gwen; Moore (D)	Scott; Fitzgerald (R)	Glenn; Grothman (R)	Tom; Tiffany (R)	Tony; Wied (R)		
120th (2027–2029)	Mitchell; Berman (D)	Mark; Pocan (D)	Rebecca; Cooke (D)	Gwen; Moore (D)	Scott; Fitzgerald (R)	Glenn; Grothman (R)	Michael; Alfonso (R)	Tony; Wied (R)		

== United States Senate ==
Current U.S. senators from Wisconsin
Wisconsin CPVI (2025): EVEN	Class I senator	Class III senator
Wisconsin CPVI (2025): EVEN	Tammy Baldwin (Junior senator) (Madison)	Ron Johnson (Senior senator) (Oshkosh)
Party	Democratic	Republican
Incumbent since	January 3, 2013	January 3, 2011

Class I senator	Congress	Class III senator
Henry Dodge (D)	30th (1847–1849)	Isaac P. Walker (D)
Henry Dodge (D)	31st (1849–1851)	Isaac P. Walker (D)
Henry Dodge (D)	32nd (1851–1853)	Isaac P. Walker (D)
Henry Dodge (D)	33rd (1853–1855)	Isaac P. Walker (D)
Henry Dodge (D)	34th (1855–1857)	Charles Durkee (R)
James R. Doolittle (R)	35th (1857–1859)	Charles Durkee (R)
James R. Doolittle (R)	36th (1859–1861)	Charles Durkee (R)
James R. Doolittle (R)	37th (1861–1863)	Timothy O. Howe (R)
James R. Doolittle (R)	38th (1863–1865)	Timothy O. Howe (R)
James R. Doolittle (R)	39th (1865–1867)	Timothy O. Howe (R)
James R. Doolittle (R)	40th (1867–1869)	Timothy O. Howe (R)
Matthew H. Carpenter (R)	41st (1869–1871)	Timothy O. Howe (R)
Matthew H. Carpenter (R)	42nd (1871–1873)	Timothy O. Howe (R)
Matthew H. Carpenter (R)	43rd (1873–1875)	Timothy O. Howe (R)
Angus Cameron (R)	44th (1875–1877)	Timothy O. Howe (R)
Angus Cameron (R)	45th (1877–1879)	Timothy O. Howe (R)
Angus Cameron (R)	46th (1879–1881)	Matthew H. Carpenter (R)
Philetus Sawyer (R)	47th (1881–1883)	Angus Cameron (R)
Philetus Sawyer (R)	48th (1883–1885)	Angus Cameron (R)
Philetus Sawyer (R)	49th (1885–1887)	John Coit Spooner (R)
Philetus Sawyer (R)	50th (1887–1889)	John Coit Spooner (R)
Philetus Sawyer (R)	51st (1889–1891)	John Coit Spooner (R)
Philetus Sawyer (R)	52nd (1891–1893)	William F. Vilas (D)
John L. Mitchell (D)	53rd (1893–1895)	William F. Vilas (D)
John L. Mitchell (D)	54th (1895–1897)	William F. Vilas (D)
John L. Mitchell (D)	55th (1897–1899)	John Coit Spooner (R)
Joseph V. Quarles (R)	56th (1899–1901)	John Coit Spooner (R)
Joseph V. Quarles (R)	57th (1901–1903)	John Coit Spooner (R)
Joseph V. Quarles (R)	58th (1903–1905)	John Coit Spooner (R)
Robert M. La Follette (R)	59th (1905–1907)	John Coit Spooner (R)
Robert M. La Follette (R)	60th (1907–1909)	John Coit Spooner (R)
Robert M. La Follette (R)	60th (1907–1909)	Isaac Stephenson (R)
Robert M. La Follette (R)	61st (1909–1911)	Isaac Stephenson (R)
Robert M. La Follette (R)	62nd (1911–1913)	Isaac Stephenson (R)
Robert M. La Follette (R)	63rd (1913–1915)	Isaac Stephenson (R)
Robert M. La Follette (R)	64th (1915–1917)	Paul O. Husting (D)
Robert M. La Follette (R)	65th (1917–1919)	Paul O. Husting (D)
Robert M. La Follette (R)	65th (1917–1919)	Irvine Lenroot (R)
Robert M. La Follette (R)	66th (1919–1921)	Irvine Lenroot (R)
Robert M. La Follette (R)	67th (1921–1923)	Irvine Lenroot (R)
Robert M. La Follette (R)	68th (1923–1925)	Irvine Lenroot (R)
Robert M. La Follette (R)	69th (1925–1927)	Irvine Lenroot (R)
Robert M. La Follette Jr. (R)	69th (1925–1927)	Irvine Lenroot (R)
Robert M. La Follette Jr. (R)	70th (1927–1929)	John J. Blaine (R)
Robert M. La Follette Jr. (R)	71st (1929–1931)	John J. Blaine (R)
Robert M. La Follette Jr. (R)	72nd (1931–1933)	John J. Blaine (R)
Robert M. La Follette Jr. (R)	73rd (1933–1935)	F. Ryan Duffy (D)
Robert M. La Follette Jr. (Prog)	74th (1935–1937)	F. Ryan Duffy (D)
Robert M. La Follette Jr. (Prog)	75th (1937–1939)	F. Ryan Duffy (D)
Robert M. La Follette Jr. (Prog)	76th (1939–1941)	Alexander Wiley (R)
Robert M. La Follette Jr. (Prog)	77th (1941–1943)	Alexander Wiley (R)
Robert M. La Follette Jr. (Prog)	78th (1943–1945)	Alexander Wiley (R)
Robert M. La Follette Jr. (Prog)	79th (1945–1947)	Alexander Wiley (R)
Joseph McCarthy (R)	80th (1947–1949)	Alexander Wiley (R)
Joseph McCarthy (R)	81st (1949–1951)	Alexander Wiley (R)
Joseph McCarthy (R)	82nd (1951–1953)	Alexander Wiley (R)
Joseph McCarthy (R)	83rd (1953–1955)	Alexander Wiley (R)
Joseph McCarthy (R)	84th (1955–1957)	Alexander Wiley (R)
Joseph McCarthy (R)	85th (1957–1959)	Alexander Wiley (R)
William Proxmire (D)	85th (1957–1959)	Alexander Wiley (R)
William Proxmire (D)	86th (1959–1961)	Alexander Wiley (R)
William Proxmire (D)	87th (1961–1963)	Alexander Wiley (R)
William Proxmire (D)	88th (1963–1965)	Gaylord Nelson (D)
William Proxmire (D)	89th (1965–1967)	Gaylord Nelson (D)
William Proxmire (D)	90th (1967–1969)	Gaylord Nelson (D)
William Proxmire (D)	91st (1969–1971)	Gaylord Nelson (D)
William Proxmire (D)	92nd (1971–1973)	Gaylord Nelson (D)
William Proxmire (D)	93rd (1973–1975)	Gaylord Nelson (D)
William Proxmire (D)	94th (1975–1977)	Gaylord Nelson (D)
William Proxmire (D)	95th (1977–1979)	Gaylord Nelson (D)
William Proxmire (D)	96th (1979–1981)	Gaylord Nelson (D)
William Proxmire (D)	97th (1981–1983)	Bob Kasten (R)
William Proxmire (D)	98th (1983–1985)	Bob Kasten (R)
William Proxmire (D)	99th (1985–1987)	Bob Kasten (R)
William Proxmire (D)	100th (1987–1989)	Bob Kasten (R)
Herb Kohl (D)	101st (1989–1991)	Bob Kasten (R)
Herb Kohl (D)	102nd (1991–1993)	Bob Kasten (R)
Herb Kohl (D)	103rd (1993–1995)	Russ Feingold (D)
Herb Kohl (D)	104th (1995–1997)	Russ Feingold (D)
Herb Kohl (D)	105th (1997–1999)	Russ Feingold (D)
Herb Kohl (D)	106th (1999–2001)	Russ Feingold (D)
Herb Kohl (D)	107th (2001–2003)	Russ Feingold (D)
Herb Kohl (D)	108th (2003–2005)	Russ Feingold (D)
Herb Kohl (D)	109th (2005–2007)	Russ Feingold (D)
Herb Kohl (D)	110th (2007–2009)	Russ Feingold (D)
Herb Kohl (D)	111th (2009–2011)	Russ Feingold (D)
Herb Kohl (D)	112th (2011–2013)	Ron Johnson (R)
Tammy Baldwin (D)	113th (2013–2015)	Ron Johnson (R)
Tammy Baldwin (D)	114th (2015–2017)	Ron Johnson (R)
Tammy Baldwin (D)	115th (2017–2019)	Ron Johnson (R)
Tammy Baldwin (D)	116th (2019–2021)	Ron Johnson (R)
Tammy Baldwin (D)	117th (2021–2023)	Ron Johnson (R)
Tammy Baldwin (D)	118th (2023–2025)	Ron Johnson (R)
Tammy Baldwin (D)	119th (2025–2027)	Ron Johnson (R)
Tammy Baldwin (D)	120th (2027–2029)	Ron Johnson (R)

== Key ==
Democratic (D)
Free Soil (FS)
Progressive (Prog)
Republican (R)
Socialist (Soc)
Whig (W)

== See also ==
- List of United States congressional districts
- Wisconsin's congressional districts
- Political party strength in Wisconsin
