= List of United States representatives from Wisconsin =

The following is an alphabetical list of United States representatives from the state of Wisconsin. For chronological tables of members of both houses of the United States Congress from the state (through the present day), see Wisconsin's congressional delegations.

== Current members ==
Updated January 3, 2025.

- 1st district: Bryan Steil (R) (since 2019)
- 2nd district: Mark Pocan (D) (since 2013)
- 3rd district: Derrick Van Orden (R) (since 2023)
- 4th district: Gwen Moore (D) (since 2005)
- 5th district: Scott L. Fitzgerald (R) (since 2021)
- 6th district: Glenn Grothman (R) (since 2015)
- 7th district: Tom Tiffany (R) (since 2020)
- 8th district: Tony Wied (R) (since 2024)

== List of members and delegates ==
Member/Delegate	Years	Party	District	Electoral history
Henry Cullen Adams	March 4, 1903 – July 9, 1906	Republican	2nd	Elected in 1902. Died.
Thomas Ryum Amlie	October 13, 1931 – March 3, 1933	Republican	1st	Elected to finish Cooper's term. Lost renomination to Blanchard.
Thomas Ryum Amlie	January 3, 1935 – January 3, 1939	Progressive	1st	Elected in 1934. Retired to run for U.S. senator.
Les Aspin	January 3, 1971 – January 20, 1993	Democratic	1st	Elected in 1970. Resigned to become U.S. Secretary of Defense.
David Atwood	February 23, 1870 – March 3, 1871	Republican	2nd	Elected to finish Hopkins's term. Retired.
Clinton Babbitt	March 4, 1891 – March 3, 1893	Democratic	1st	Elected in 1890. Lost re-election to Cooper.
Joseph W. Babcock	March 4, 1893 – March 3, 1907	Republican	3rd	Elected in 1892. Lost re-election to Murphy.
Alvin Baldus	January 3, 1975 – January 3, 1981	Democratic	3rd	Elected in 1974. Lost re-election to Gunderson.
Tammy Baldwin	January 3, 1999 – January 3, 2013	Democratic	2nd	Elected in 1998. Retired to run for U.S. senator.
J. Allen Barber	March 4, 1871 – March 3, 1875	Republican	3rd	Elected in 1870. Retired.
Peter W. Barca	May 4, 1993 – January 3, 1995	Democratic	1st	Elected to finish Aspin's term. Lost re-election to Neumann.
Lyman E. Barnes	March 4, 1893 – March 3, 1895	Democratic	8th	Elected in 1892. Lost re-election to Minor.
Samuel S. Barney	March 4, 1895 – March 3, 1903	Republican	5th	Elected in 1894. Retired.
Tom Barrett	January 3, 1993 – January 3, 2003	Democratic	5th	Elected in 1992. Retired to run for governor.
Charles Barwig	March 4, 1889 – March 3, 1895	Democratic	2nd	Elected in 1888. Lost re-election to Sauerhering.
Joseph D. Beck	March 4, 1921 – March 3, 1929	Republican	7th	Elected in 1920. Retired to run for governor.
Victor L. Berger	March 4, 1911 – March 3, 1913	Socialist	5th	Elected in 1910. Lost re-election to Stafford.
Victor L. Berger	March 4, 1923 – March 3, 1929	Socialist	5th	Elected in 1922. Lost re-election to Stafford.
Andrew Biemiller	January 3, 1945 – January 3, 1947	Democratic	5th	Elected in 1944. Lost re-election to Kersten.
Andrew Biemiller	January 3, 1949 – January 3, 1951	Democratic	5th	Elected in 1948. Lost re-election to Kersten.
Charles Billinghurst	March 4, 1855 – March 3, 1857	Opposition	3rd	Elected in 1854. Switched parties.
Charles Billinghurst	March 4, 1857 – March 3, 1859	Republican	3rd	Re-elected in 1856 as a Republican. Lost re-election to Larrabee.
George W. Blanchard	March 4, 1933 – January 3, 1935	Republican	1st	Elected in 1932. Renominated but withdrew prior to election.
Gerald J. Boileau	March 4, 1931 – March 3, 1933	Republican	8th	Elected in 1930. Redistricted to the 7th district.
Gerald J. Boileau	March 4, 1933 – January 3, 1935	Republican	7th	Redistricted from the 8th district and re-elected in 1932. Switched parties.
Gerald J. Boileau	January 3, 1935 – January 3, 1939	Progressive	7th	Re-elected in 1934 as a Progressive. Lost re-election to Murray.
Stephen Bolles	January 3, 1939 – July 8, 1941	Republican	1st	Elected in 1938. Died.
Gabriel Bouck	March 4, 1877 – March 3, 1881	Democratic	6th	Elected in 1876. Lost re-election to Guenther.
Edward S. Bragg	March 4, 1877 – March 3, 1883	Democratic	5th	Elected in 1876. Redistricted to the 2nd district and lost renomination to Sumner.
Edward S. Bragg	March 4, 1885 – March 3, 1887	Democratic	2nd	Elected in 1884. Lost renomination to Arthur Delaney.
George H. Brickner	March 4, 1889 – March 3, 1895	Democratic	5th	Elected in 1888. Retired.
John C. Brophy	January 3, 1947 – January 3, 1949	Republican	4th	Elected in 1946. Lost re-election to Zablocki.
James S. Brown	March 4, 1863 – March 3, 1865	Democratic	1st	Elected in 1862. Renominated but withdrew from re-election.
Webster E. Brown	March 4, 1901 – March 3, 1903	Republican	9th	Elected in 1900. Redistricted to the 10th district.
Webster E. Brown	March 4, 1903 – March 3, 1907	Republican	10th	Redistricted from the 9th district and re-elected in 1902. Retired.
Edward E. Browne	March 4, 1913 – March 3, 1931	Republican	8th	Elected in 1912. Lost renomination to Boileau.
Samuel D. Burchard	March 4, 1875 – March 3, 1877	Democratic	5th	Elected in 1874. Lost renomination to Bragg.
Michael E. Burke	March 4, 1911 – March 3, 1913	Democratic	6th	Elected in 1910. Redistricted to the 2nd district.
Michael E. Burke	March 4, 1913 – March 3, 1917	Democratic	2nd	Redistricted from the 6th district and re-elected in 1912. Lost re-election to Voigt.
Allen R. Bushnell	March 4, 1891 – March 3, 1893	Democratic	3rd	Elected in 1890. Retired.
John W. Byrnes	January 3, 1945 – January 3, 1973	Republican	8th	Elected in 1944. Retired.
Raymond Joseph Cannon	March 4, 1933 – January 3, 1939	Democratic	4th	Elected in 1932. Lost renomination to Wasielewski and lost re-election as an independent.
William J. Cary	March 4, 1907 – March 3, 1919	Republican	4th	Elected in 1906. Lost renomination to J.C. Kleczka.
Lucien B. Caswell	March 4, 1875 – March 3, 1883	Republican	2nd	Elected in 1874. Lost renomination.
Lucien B. Caswell	March 4, 1885 – March 3, 1891	Republican	1st	Elected in 1884. Lost renomination.
George W. Cate	March 4, 1875 – March 3, 1877	Democratic	8th	Elected in 1874. Lost re-election to Pound.
Charles B. Clark	March 4, 1887 – March 3, 1891	Republican	6th	Elected in 1886. Lost re-election to Miller.
David G. Classon	March 4, 1917 – March 3, 1923	Republican	9th	Elected in 1916. Retired.
Amasa Cobb	March 4, 1863 – March 3, 1871	Republican	3rd	Elected in 1862. Retired.
Frank P. Coburn	March 4, 1891 – March 3, 1893	Democratic	7th	Elected in 1890. Lost re-election to Shaw.
Orasmus Cole	March 4, 1849 – March 3, 1851	Whig	2nd	Elected in 1848. Lost re-election to Eastman.
Samuel A. Cook	March 4, 1895 – March 3, 1897	Republican	6th	Elected in 1894. Retired to run for U.S. senator.
Henry A. Cooper	March 4, 1893 – March 3, 1919	Republican	1st	Elected in 1892. Lost renomination to Randall and lost re-election as an independent.
Henry A. Cooper	March 4, 1921 – March 1, 1931	Republican	1st	Elected in 1920. Re-elected but died before next term began.
Robert John Cornell	January 3, 1975 – January 3, 1979	Democratic	8th	Elected in 1974. Lost re-election to Roth.
Herman B. Dahle	March 4, 1899 – March 3, 1903	Republican	2nd	Elected in 1898. Lost renomination to Adams.
Mason Cook Darling	June 9, 1848 – March 3, 1849	Democratic	2nd	Elected to the short term. Retired.
James H. Davidson	March 4, 1897 – March 3, 1903	Republican	6th	Elected in 1896. Redistricted to the 8th district.
James H. Davidson	March 4, 1903 – March 3, 1913	Republican	8th	Redistricted from the 6th district and re-elected in 1902. Lost re-election to Browne.
James H. Davidson	March 4, 1917 – August 6, 1918	Republican	6th	Elected in 1916. Died.
Glenn Robert Davis	April 22, 1947 – January 3, 1957	Republican	2nd	Elected to finish Henry's term. Retired to run for U.S. senator.
Glenn Robert Davis	January 3, 1965 – December 31, 1974	Republican	9th	Elected in 1964. Lost renomination to Kasten and resigned early.
Peter V. Deuster	March 4, 1879 – March 3, 1885	Democratic	4th	Elected in 1878. Lost re-election to Van Schaick.
LaVern R. Dilweg	January 3, 1943 – January 3, 1945	Democratic	8th	Elected in 1942. Lost re-election to Byrnes.
James D. Doty	January 14, 1839 – March 3, 1841	Democratic	Territory	Elected in 1838. Retired.
James D. Doty	March 4, 1849 – March 3, 1851	Democratic	3rd	Elected in 1848. Switched parties.
James D. Doty	March 4, 1851 – March 3, 1853	Independent Democratic	3rd	Re-elected in 1850 as an Independent Democrat. Retired.
Sean Duffy	January 3, 2011 – September 23, 2019	Republican	7th	Elected in 2010. Resigned due to family health issues.
Charles Durkee	March 4, 1849 – March 3, 1853	Free Soil Party	1st	Elected in 1848. Retired.
Ben C. Eastman	March 4, 1851 – March 3, 1855	Democratic	2nd	Elected in 1850. Retired.
Charles A. Eldredge	March 4, 1863 – March 3, 1873	Democratic	4th	Elected in 1862. Redistricted to the 5th district.
Charles A. Eldredge	March 4, 1873 – March 3, 1875	Democratic	5th	Redistricted from the 4th district and re-elected in 1872. Lost renomination to Burchard.
John J. Esch	March 4, 1899 – March 3, 1921	Republican	7th	Elected in 1898. Lost renomination to Beck.
Scott L. Fitzgerald	January 3, 2021 – present	Republican	5th	Elected in 2020. Incumbent
Gerald T. Flynn	January 3, 1959 – January 3, 1961	Democratic	1st	Elected in 1958. Lost re-election to Schadeberg.
James A. Frear	March 4, 1913 – March 3, 1933	Republican	10th	Elected in 1912. Redistricted to the 9th district.
James A. Frear	March 4, 1933 – January 3, 1935	Republican	9th	Redistricted from the 10th district and re-elected in 1932. Retired.
Harold Vernon Froehlich	January 3, 1973 – January 3, 1975	Republican	8th	Elected in 1972. Lost re-election to Cornell.
Mike Gallagher	January 3, 2017 – April 24, 2024	Republican	8th	Elected in 2016. Resigned.
Bernard J. Gehrmann	January 3, 1935 – January 3, 1943	Progressive	10th	Elected in 1934. Lost re-election to O'Konski.
Mark Green	January 3, 1999 – January 3, 2007	Republican	8th	Elected in 1998. Retired to run for governor.
Michael Griffin	November 5, 1894 – March 3, 1899	Republican	7th	Elected to finish Shaw's term. Retired.
Harry W. Griswold	January 3, 1939 – July 4, 1939	Republican	3rd	Elected in 1938. Died.
Glenn Grothman	January 3, 2015 – present	Republican	6th	Elected in 2014. Incumbent.
Richard W. Guenther	March 4, 1881 – March 3, 1887	Republican	6th	Elected in 1880. Redistricted to the 2nd district.
Richard W. Guenther	March 4, 1887 – March 3, 1889	Republican	2nd	Redistricted from the 6th district and re-elected in 1886. Retired.
Steve Gunderson	January 3, 1981 – January 3, 1997	Republican	3rd	Elected in 1980. Retired.
Luther Hanchett	March 4, 1861 – November 24, 1862	Republican	2nd	Elected in 1860. Died.
Nils P. Haugen	March 4, 1887 – March 3, 1893	Republican	8th	Elected in 1886. Redistricted to the 10th district.
Nils P. Haugen	March 4, 1893 – March 3, 1895	Republican	10th	Redistricted from the 8th district and re-elected in 1892. Retired to run for governor.
Charles Hawks Jr.	January 3, 1939 – January 3, 1941	Republican	2nd	Elected in 1938. Lost re-election to Sauthoff.
George Cochrane Hazelton	March 4, 1877 – March 3, 1883	Republican	3rd	Elected in 1876. Lost renomination.
Gerry Whiting Hazelton	March 4, 1871 – March 3, 1875	Republican	2nd	Elected in 1870. Retired.
Charles W. Henney	March 4, 1933 – January 3, 1935	Democratic	2nd	Elected in 1932. Lost re-election to Sauthoff.
Robert K. Henry	January 3, 1945 – November 20, 1946	Republican	2nd	Elected in 1944. Re-elected but died before next term began.
Benjamin F. Hopkins	March 4, 1867 – January 1, 1870	Republican	2nd	Elected in 1866. Died.
Thomas R. Hudd	March 8, 1886 – March 3, 1889	Democratic	5th	Elected to finish Rankin's term. Retired.
James F. Hughes	March 4, 1933 – January 3, 1935	Democratic	8th	Elected in 1932. Retired.
Merlin Hull	March 4, 1929 – March 3, 1931	Republican	7th	Elected in 1928. Lost renomination to Withrow.
Merlin Hull	January 3, 1935 – January 3, 1947	Progressive	9th	Elected in 1934. Switched parties.
Merlin Hull	January 3, 1947 – May 17, 1953	Republican	9th	Re-elected in 1946 as a Republican. Died.
Herman L. Humphrey	March 4, 1877 – March 3, 1883	Republican	7th	Elected in 1876. Lost renomination.
John J. Jenkins	March 4, 1895 – March 3, 1903	Republican	10th	Elected in 1894. Redistricted to the 11th district.
John J. Jenkins	March 4, 1903 – March 3, 1909	Republican	11th	Redistricted from the 10th district and re-elected in 1902. Lost renomination to Lenroot.
Joshua L. Johns	January 3, 1939 – January 3, 1943	Republican	8th	Elected in 1938. Lost re-election to Dilweg.
Jay W. Johnson	January 3, 1997 – January 3, 1999	Democratic	8th	Elected in 1996. Lost re-election to Green.
Lester Johnson	October 13, 1953 – January 3, 1965	Democratic	9th	Elected to finish Hull's term. Retired.
Burr W. Jones	March 4, 1883 – March 3, 1885	Democratic	3rd	Elected in 1882. Lost re-election to La Follette.
George Wallace Jones	January 26, 1837 – March 3, 1837	Jacksonian	Territory	Redistricted from the Michigan Territory. Switched parties.
George Wallace Jones	March 4, 1837 – January 14, 1839	Democratic	Territory	Re-elected in 1836 as a Democrat. Election invalidated.
Henry Dodge	March 4, 1841 – March 3, 1845	Democratic	Territory	Elected in 1840. Retired to become Governor of Wisconsin Territory.
Morgan L. Martin	March 4, 1845 – March 3, 1847	Democratic	Territory	Elected in 1844. Lost re-election to Tweedy.
John H. Tweedy	March 4, 1847 – May 28, 1848	Whig	Territory	Elected in 1846. Resigned.
Henry H. Sibley	October 30, 1848 – March 3, 1849 (Note: The district was eliminated with the creation of the Minnesota Territory on March 2, 1849. However, Henry Sibley continued to serve out his term as the Delegate from the Territory of Wisconsin until March 3, 1849 making the district's effective elimination on March 3, 1849 the conclusion of the Congress.)	Democratic	Territory	Elected to finish Tweedy's term. Redistricted to the Minnesota Territory.
Charles A. Kading	March 4, 1927 – March 3, 1933	Republican	2nd	Elected in 1926. Lost renomination to John B. Gay.
Steve Kagen	January 3, 2007 – January 3, 2011	Democratic	8th	Elected in 2006. Lost re-election to Ribble.
Bob Kasten	January 3, 1975 – January 3, 1979	Republican	9th	Elected in 1974. Retired to run for governor.
Robert Kastenmeier	January 3, 1959 – January 3, 1991	Democratic	2nd	Elected in 1958. Lost re-election to Klug.
Frank Bateman Keefe	January 3, 1939 – January 3, 1951	Republican	6th	Elected in 1938. Retired.
Charles J. Kersten	January 3, 1947 – January 3, 1949	Republican	5th	Elected in 1946. Lost re-election to Biemiller.
Charles J. Kersten	January 3, 1951 – January 3, 1955	Republican	5th	Elected in 1950. Lost re-election to Reuss.
Alanson M. Kimball	March 4, 1875 – March 3, 1877	Republican	6th	Elected in 1874. Lost re-election to Bouck.
Ron Kind	January 3, 1997 – January 3, 2023	Democratic	3rd	Elected in 1996. Retired.
Jerry Kleczka	April 3, 1984 – January 3, 2005	Democratic	4th	Elected to finish Zablocki's term. Retired.
John C. Kleczka	March 4, 1919 – March 3, 1923	Republican	4th	Elected in 1918. Retired.
Scott L. Klug	January 3, 1991 – January 3, 1999	Republican	2nd	Elected in 1990. Retired.
Thomas F. Konop	March 4, 1911 – March 3, 1917	Democratic	9th	Elected in 1910. Lost re-election to Classon.
Arthur W. Kopp	March 4, 1909 – March 3, 1913	Republican	3rd	Elected in 1908. Retired.
Gustav Küstermann	March 4, 1907 – March 3, 1911	Republican	9th	Elected in 1906. Lost re-election to Konop.
Robert M. La Follette	March 4, 1885 – March 3, 1891	Republican	3rd	Elected in 1884. Lost re-election to Bushnell.
Melvin R. Laird	January 3, 1953 – January 21, 1969	Republican	7th	Elected in 1952. Resigned to become U.S. Secretary of Defense.
Florian Lampert	November 5, 1918 – July 18, 1930	Republican	6th	Elected to finish Davidson's term. Died.
Charles H. Larrabee	March 4, 1859 – March 3, 1861	Democratic	3rd	Elected in 1858. Lost re-election to A.S. Sloan.
Irvine Lenroot	March 4, 1909 – April 17, 1918	Republican	11th	Elected in 1908. Resigned when elected U.S. senator.
Thomas Lynch	March 4, 1891 – March 3, 1895	Democratic	9th	Elected in 1890. Retired.
William Pitt Lynde	June 5, 1848 – March 3, 1849	Democratic	1st	Elected to the short term. Lost re-election to Durkee.
William Pitt Lynde	March 4, 1875 – March 3, 1879	Democratic	4th	Elected in 1874. Retired.
John B. Macy	March 4, 1853 – March 3, 1855	Democratic	3rd	Elected in 1852. Lost re-election to Billinghurst.
Henry S. Magoon	March 4, 1875 – March 3, 1877	Republican	3rd	Elected in 1874. Lost renomination to G.C. Hazelton.
Myron H. McCord	March 4, 1889 – March 3, 1891	Republican	9th	Elected in 1888. Lost re-election to Lynch.
Alexander S. McDill	March 4, 1873 – March 3, 1875	Republican	8th	Elected in 1872. Lost re-election to Cate.
Walter D. McIndoe	January 26, 1863 – March 3, 1863	Republican	2nd	Elected to finish Hanchett's term. Redistricted to the 6th district.
Walter D. McIndoe	March 4, 1863 – March 3, 1867	Republican	6th	Redistricted from the 2nd district and re-elected in 1862. Retired.
Howard J. McMurray	January 3, 1943 – January 3, 1945	Democratic	5th	Elected in 1942. Retired to run for U.S. Senator.
Lucas M. Miller	March 4, 1891 – March 3, 1893	Democratic	6th	Elected in 1890. Lost renomination to O. Wells.
Edward S. Minor	March 4, 1895 – March 3, 1903	Republican	8th	Elected in 1894. Redistricted to the 9th district.
Edward S. Minor	March 4, 1903 – March 3, 1907	Republican	9th	Redistricted from the 8th district and re-elected in 1902. Lost renomination to Küstermann.
Alexander Mitchell	March 4, 1871 – March 3, 1873	Democratic	1st	Elected in 1870. Redistricted to the 4th district.
Alexander Mitchell	March 4, 1873 – March 3, 1875	Democratic	4th	Redistricted from the 1st district and re-elected in 1872. Retired.
John L. Mitchell	March 4, 1891 – March 3, 1893	Democratic	4th	Elected in 1890. Re-elected but resigned when elected U.S. senator.
James G. Monahan	March 4, 1919 – March 3, 1921	Republican	3rd	Elected in 1918. Lost renomination to J. Nelson.
Jim Moody	January 3, 1983 – January 3, 1993	Democratic	5th	Elected in 1982. Retired to run for U.S. senator.
Gwen Moore	January 3, 2005 – present	Democratic	4th	Elected in 2004. Incumbent.
Elmer A. Morse	March 4, 1907 – March 3, 1913	Republican	10th	Elected in 1906. Lost re-election to Frear.
James William Murphy	March 4, 1907 – March 3, 1909	Democratic	3rd	Elected in 1906. Lost re-election to Kopp.
Reid F. Murray	January 3, 1939 – April 29, 1952	Republican	7th	Elected in 1938. Died.
Adolphus P. Nelson	November 5, 1918 – March 3, 1923	Republican	11th	Elected to finish Lenroot's term. Lost re-election to Peavey.
John M. Nelson	September 4, 1906 – March 3, 1913	Republican	2nd	Elected to finish Adams's term. Redistricted to the 3rd district.
John M. Nelson	March 4, 1913 – March 3, 1919	Republican	3rd	Redistricted from the 2nd district and re-elected in 1912. Lost renomination to Monahan.
John M. Nelson	March 4, 1921 – March 3, 1933	Republican	3rd	Elected in 1920. Lost renomination to Withrow.
Mark Neumann	January 3, 1995 – January 3, 1999	Republican	1st	Elected in 1994. Retired to run for U.S. senator.
Alvin O'Konski	January 3, 1943 – March 3, 1973	Republican	10th	Elected in 1942. Redistricted to the 7th district and lost re-election to Obey.
Thomas O'Malley	March 4, 1933 – January 3, 1939	Democratic	5th	Elected in 1932. Lost re-election to Thill.
Dave Obey	April 1, 1969 – January 3, 2011	Democratic	7th	Elected to finish Laird's term. Retired.
Theobald Otjen	March 4, 1895 – March 3, 1907	Republican	4th	Elected in 1894. Lost renomination to Cary.
Halbert E. Paine	March 4, 1865 – March 3, 1871	Republican	1st	Elected in 1864. Retired.
Hubert H. Peavey	March 4, 1923 – March 3, 1933	Republican	11th	Elected in 1922. Redistricted to the 10th district.
Hubert H. Peavey	March 4, 1933 – January 3, 1935	Republican	10th	Redistricted from the 11th district and re-elected in 1932. Lost re-election to Gehrmann.
Tom Petri	April 3, 1979 – January 3, 2015	Republican	6th	Elected to finish Steiger's term. Retired.
Mark Pocan	January 3, 2013 – present	Democratic	2nd	Elected in 2012. Incumbent.
John F. Potter	March 4, 1857 – March 3, 1863	Republican	1st	Elected in 1856. Lost re-election to J. Brown.
Thaddeus C. Pound	March 4, 1877 – March 3, 1883	Republican	8th	Elected in 1876. Retired.
Hugh H. Price	January 18, 1887 – March 3, 1887	Republican	8th	Elected to finish his father's term. Retired.
William T. Price	March 4, 1883 – December 6, 1886	Republican	8th	Elected in 1882. Died.
John Abner Race	January 3, 1965 – January 3, 1967	Democratic	6th	Elected in 1964. Lost re-election to Steiger.
Clifford E. Randall	March 4, 1919 – March 3, 1921	Republican	1st	Elected in 1918. Lost renomination to Cooper.
Joseph Rankin	March 4, 1883 – January 24, 1886	Democratic	5th	Elected in 1882. Died.
Michael K. Reilly	March 4, 1913 – March 3, 1917	Democratic	6th	Elected in 1912. Lost re-election to Davidson.
Michael K. Reilly	November 4, 1930 – January 3, 1939	Democratic	6th	Elected to finish Lampert's term. Lost re-election to Keefe.
Henry S. Reuss	January 3, 1955 – January 3, 1983	Democratic	5th	Elected in 1954. Retired.
Reid Ribble	January 3, 2011 – January 3, 2017	Republican	8th	Elected in 2010. Retired.
Toby Roth	January 3, 1979 – January 3, 1997	Republican	8th	Elected in 1978. Retired.
Jeremiah McLain Rusk	March 4, 1871 – March 3, 1873	Republican	6th	Elected in 1870. Redistricted to the 7th district.
Jeremiah McLain Rusk	March 4, 1873 – March 3, 1877	Republican	7th	Redistricted from the 6th district and re-elected in 1872. Retired.
Paul Ryan	January 3, 1999 – January 3, 2019	Republican	1st	Elected in 1998. Retired.
Edward Sauerhering	March 4, 1895 – March 3, 1899	Republican	2nd	Elected in 1894. Retired.
Harry Sauthoff	January 3, 1935 – January 3, 1939	Progressive	2nd	Elected in 1934. Lost re-election to Hawks.
Harry Sauthoff	January 3, 1941 – January 3, 1945	Progressive	2nd	Elected in 1940. Lost re-election to Henry.
Philetus Sawyer	March 4, 1865 – March 3, 1873	Republican	5th	Elected in 1864. Redistricted to the 6th district.
Philetus Sawyer	March 4, 1873 – March 3, 1875	Republican	6th	Redistricted from the 5th district and re-elected in 1872. Retired.
Henry C. Schadeberg	January 3, 1961 – January 3, 1965	Republican	1st	Elected in 1960. Lost re-election to Stalbaum.
Henry C. Schadeberg	January 3, 1967 – January 3, 1971	Republican	1st	Elected in 1966. Lost re-election to Aspin.
John C. Schafer	March 4, 1923 – March 3, 1933	Republican	4th	Elected in 1922. Lost re-election to Cannon.
John C. Schafer	January 3, 1939 – January 3, 1941	Republican	4th	Elected in 1938. Lost re-election to Wasielewski.
George J. Schneider	March 4, 1923 – March 3, 1933	Republican	9th	Elected in 1922. Redistricted to the 8th district and lost re-election to Hughes.
George J. Schneider	January 3, 1935 – January 3, 1939	Progressive	8th	Elected in 1934. Lost re-election to Johns.
Jim Sensenbrenner	January 3, 1979 – January 3, 2003	Republican	9th	Elected in 1978. Redistricted to the 5th district.
Jim Sensenbrenner	January 3, 2003 – January 3, 2021	Republican	5th	Redistricted from the 9th district and re-elected in 2002. Retired.
George B. Shaw	March 4, 1893 – August 27, 1894	Republican	7th	Elected in 1892. Died.
A. Scott Sloan	March 4, 1861 – March 3, 1863	Republican	3rd	Elected in 1860. Retired.
Ithamar Sloan	March 4, 1863 – March 3, 1867	Republican	2nd	Elected in 1862. Retired.
Henry Smith	March 4, 1887 – March 3, 1889	Laborite	4th	Elected in 1886. Lost re-election to Van Schaick.
Lawrence H. Smith	August 29, 1941 – January 22, 1958	Republican	1st	Elected to finish Bolles's term. Died.
Peter J. Somers	August 27, 1893 – March 3, 1895	Democratic	4th	Elected to finish Mitchell's term. Retired.
William H. Stafford	March 4, 1903 – March 3, 1911	Republican	5th	Elected in 1902. Lost renomination.
William H. Stafford	March 4, 1913 – March 3, 1919	Republican	5th	Elected in 1912. Lost re-election to Berger. (Note: Congress refused to seat Berger)
William H. Stafford	March 4, 1921 – March 3, 1923	Republican	5th	Elected in 1920. Lost re-election to Berger
William H. Stafford	March 4, 1929 – March 3, 1933	Republican	5th	Elected in 1928. Lost renomination to Joseph A. Padway.
Lynn E. Stalbaum	January 3, 1965 – January 3, 1967	Democratic	1st	Elected in 1964. Lost re-election to Schadeberg.
William A. Steiger	January 3, 1967 – December 4, 1978	Republican	6th	Elected in 1966. Re-elected but died before next term began.
Bryan Steil	January 3, 2019 – present	Republican	1st	Elected in 2018. Incumbent.
Isaac Stephenson	March 4, 1883 – March 3, 1889	Republican	9th	Elected in 1882. Retired.
William H. Stevenson	January 3, 1941 – January 3, 1949	Republican	3rd	Elected in 1940. Lost renomination to Withrow.
Alexander Stewart	March 4, 1895 – March 3, 1901	Republican	9th	Elected in 1894. Retired.
Daniel H. Sumner	March 4, 1883 – March 3, 1885	Democratic	2nd	Elected in 1882. Retired.
Donald Edgar Tewes	January 3, 1957 – January 3, 1959	Republican	2nd	Elected in 1956. Lost re-election to Kastenmeier.
Lewis D. Thill	January 3, 1939 – January 3, 1943	Republican	5th	Elected in 1938. Lost re-election to McMurray.
Ormsby B. Thomas	March 4, 1885 – March 3, 1891	Republican	7th	Elected in 1884. Lost re-election to Coburn.
Vernon Wallace Thomson	January 3, 1961 – December 31, 1974	Republican	3rd	Elected in 1960. Lost re-election to Baldus and resigned early.
William Van Pelt	January 3, 1951 – January 3, 1965	Republican	6th	Elected in 1950. Lost re-election to Race.
Isaac W. Van Schaick	March 4, 1885 – March 3, 1887	Republican	4th	Elected in 1884. Retired.
Isaac W. Van Schaick	March 4, 1889 – March 3, 1891	Republican	4th	Elected in 1888. Retired to run for state senator.
Tom Tiffany	May 12, 2020 – present	Republican	7th	Elected to finish Duffy's term. Incumbent.
Derrick Van Orden	January 3, 2023 – present	Republican	3rd	Elected in 2022. Incumbent.
Edward Voigt	March 4, 1917 – March 3, 1927	Republican	2nd	Elected in 1916. Retired.
Cadwallader C. Washburn	March 4, 1855 – March 3, 1861	Republican	2nd	Elected in 1854. Retired.
Cadwallader C. Washburn	March 4, 1867 – March 3, 1871	Republican	6th	Elected in 1866. Retired.
Thad F. Wasielewski	January 3, 1941 – January 3, 1947	Democratic	4th	Elected in 1940. Lost renomination to Edmund V. Bobrowicz and lost re-election as an independent.
Charles H. Weisse	March 4, 1903 – March 3, 1911	Democratic	6th	Elected in 1902. Retired.
Daniel Wells Jr.	March 4, 1853 – March 3, 1857	Democratic	1st	Elected in 1852. Retired.
Owen A. Wells	March 4, 1893 – March 3, 1895	Democratic	6th	Elected in 1892. Lost re-election to Cook.
Ezra Wheeler	March 4, 1863 – March 3, 1865	Democratic	5th	Elected in 1862. Retired.
Tony Wied	November 5, 2024 – present	Republican	8th	Elected to finish Gallagher's term. Incumbent.
Charles G. Williams	March 4, 1873 – March 3, 1883	Republican	1st	Elected in 1872. Lost re-election to Winans.
John Winans	March 4, 1883 – March 3, 1885	Democratic	1st	Elected in 1882. Retired to run for mayor of Janesville.
Gardner R. Withrow	March 4, 1931 – March 3, 1933	Republican	7th	Elected in 1930. Redistricted to the 3rd district.
Gardner R. Withrow	March 4, 1933 – January 3, 1935	Republican	3rd	Redistricted from the 7th district and re-elected in 1932. Switched parties.
Gardner R. Withrow	January 3, 1935 – January 3, 1939	Progressive	3rd	Re-elected in 1934 as a Progressive. Lost re-election to Griswold.
Gardner R. Withrow	January 3, 1949 – January 3, 1961	Republican	3rd	Elected in 1948. Retired.
Gilbert M. Woodward	March 4, 1883 – March 3, 1885	Democratic	7th	Elected in 1882. Lost re-election to Thomas.
Clement J. Zablocki	January 3, 1949 – December 3, 1983	Democratic	4th	Elected in 1948. Died.

== See also ==
- List of United States senators from Wisconsin
- Wisconsin's congressional delegations
- Wisconsin's congressional districts
