= Troy, Wisconsin =

Troy is the name of several settlements in the U.S. state of Wisconsin:

- Troy, Sauk County, Wisconsin, a town
- Troy, St. Croix County, Wisconsin, a town
- Troy, Walworth County, Wisconsin, a town
- Troy (community), Walworth County, Wisconsin, an unincorporated community
- Troy Center, Wisconsin, an unincorporated community

== See also ==
- East Troy, Wisconsin, a village
- East Troy (town), Wisconsin, a town
- Troy, Wisconsin is also a ghost town in Douglas County, Wisconsin.
