= Wisconsin's 1st congressional district =

U.S. House district for Wisconsin

Coordinates: 42°41′43″N 88°02′47″W

- Interactive map of district boundaries since January 3, 2023
- Representative: Bryan Steil; R–Janesville
- Area: 3,039.14 mi^{2} (7,871.3 km^{2})
- Distribution: 85.64% urban; 14.36% rural
- Population (2025): 738,058
- Median household income: $81,666
- Ethnicity: 74.56% White; 15.50% Hispanic; 12.66% Two or more races; 6.00% Black; 4.08% other; 1.94% Asian; 0.69% Native American; 0.06% Pacific Islander Americans
- Cook PVI: R+2

Wisconsin's 1st congressional district is a congressional district of the United States House of Representatives in southeastern Wisconsin, covering Kenosha County, Racine County, and most of Walworth County, as well as portions of Rock County and Milwaukee County. The district's current Representative is Republican Bryan Steil.

Among the district's previous representatives are U.S. Secretary of Defense Les Aspin and Speaker of the House and 2012 Vice Presidential-nominee Paul Ryan.

A slightly Republican-leaning district, it was carried by George W. Bush in 2004 with 53%; the district voted for Barack Obama over John McCain in 2008, 51.40–47.45% and the district voted for Mitt Romney over Barack Obama in 2012, 52.12%–47.88%. It stayed Republican in 2016, with a plurality of voters polling for Donald Trump.

== Composition ==
For the 118th and successive Congresses (based on redistricting following the 2020 census), the district contains all or portions of the following counties, towns, and municipalities:

Kenosha County (13)

All 13 towns and municipalities

Milwaukee County (7)

Cudahy, Franklin, Greendale, Hales Corners, Oak Creek, South Milwaukee, St. Francis

Racine County (17)

All 17 towns and municipalities

Rock County (15)

Beloit (city) (part; also 2nd), Beloit (town) (part; also 2nd) Bradford, Clinton (town), Clinton (village), Janesville (city) (part; also 2nd), Janesville (town) (part; also 2nd), Johnstown, La Prairie (part; also 2nd), Lima, Milton (city), Milton (town), Rock (part; also 2nd), Turtle (part; also 2nd)

Walworth County (26)

Bloomfield, Darien (town), Darien (village), Delavan (city), Delavan (town), East Troy (part; also 5th), Elkhorn, Geneva, Genoa City (shared with Kenosha County), Fontana-on-Geneva Lake, Lafayette, Lake Geneva, La Grange, Linn, Lyons, Richmond, Sharon (town), Sharon (village), Spring Prairie, Sugar Creek, Troy, Walworth (town), Walworth (village), Whitewater (city) (part; also 5th; shared with Jefferson County), Whitewater (town), Williams Bay

== Recent election results from statewide races ==
Currently, it is a swing district that leans Republican, although it was redrawn to be more Democratic-leaning in 2022.

Year	Office	Results
2008	President	Obama 55% - 44%
2010	Senate	Johnson 55% - 44%
2010	Governor	Walker 55% - 44%
2010	Secretary of State	King 50% - 49%
2010	Attorney General	Van Hollen 60% - 40%
2010	Treasurer	Schuller 55% - 44%
2012	President	Obama 53% - 47%
2012	Senate	Baldwin 51% - 46%
2012	Governor (Recall)	Walker 53% - 46%
2014	Governor	Walker 54% - 45%
2014	Secretary of State	La Follette 48.3% - 48.0%
2014	Attorney General	Schimel 53% - 44%
2014	Treasurer	Adamczyk 51% - 43%
2016	President	Trump 48% - 46%
2016	Senate	Johnson 51% - 46%
2018	Senate	Baldwin 54% - 46%
2018	Governor	Walker 49% - 48%
2018	Secretary of State	La Follette 52% - 48%
2018	Attorney General	Schimel 50% - 48%
2018	Treasurer	Godlewski 50% - 47%
2020	President	Trump 50% - 48%
2022	Senate	Johnson 52% - 48%
2022	Governor	Michels 49.5% - 49.3%
2022	Secretary of State	Loudenbeck 50% - 46%
2022	Attorney General	Toney 51% - 49%
2022	Treasurer	Leiber 51% - 46%
2024	President	Trump 51% - 47%
2024	Senate	Hovde 50% - 47%

== List of members representing the district ==
Member	Party	Years	Cong ress	Electoral history	District
District established June 5, 1848
William Pitt Lynde (Milwaukee)	Democratic	June 5, 1848 – March 3, 1849	30th	Elected to the short term in 1848. Lost re-election.	Green, Jefferson, Milwaukee, Racine, Rock, Walworth, & Waukesha counties
Charles Durkee (Kenosha)	Free Soil	March 4, 1849 – March 3, 1853	31st 32nd	Elected to the regular term in 1848. Re-elected in 1850. Retired.	Milwaukee, Racine, Walworth, & Waukesha counties (& Kenosha—created in 1850 from Racine)
Daniel Wells Jr. (Milwaukee)	Democratic	March 4, 1853 – March 3, 1857	33rd 34th	Elected in 1852. Re-elected in 1854. Retired.	Milwaukee, Racine, Walworth, & Waukesha counties (& Kenosha—created in 1850 from Racine)
John F. Potter (East Troy)	Republican	March 4, 1857 – March 3, 1863	35th 36th 37th	Elected in 1856. Re-elected in 1858. Re-elected in 1860. Lost re-election.	Milwaukee, Racine, Walworth, & Waukesha counties (& Kenosha—created in 1850 from Racine)
James S. Brown (Milwaukee)	Democratic	March 4, 1863 – March 3, 1865	38th	Elected in 1862. Withdrew from re-election.	Kenosha, Milwaukee, Racine, Walworth, & Waukesha counties
Halbert E. Paine (Milwaukee)	Republican	March 4, 1865 – March 3, 1871	39th 40th 41st	Elected in 1864. Re-elected in 1866. Re-elected in 1868. Retired.	Kenosha, Milwaukee, Racine, Walworth, & Waukesha counties
Alexander Mitchell (Milwaukee)	Democratic	March 4, 1871 – March 3, 1873	42nd	Elected in 1870. Redistricted to the 4th district.	Kenosha, Milwaukee, Racine, Walworth, & Waukesha counties
Charles G. Williams (Janesville)	Republican	March 4, 1873 – March 3, 1883	43rd 44th 45th 46th 47th	Elected in 1872. Re-elected in 1874. Re-elected in 1876. Re-elected in 1878. Re-elected in 1880. Lost re-election.	Kenosha, Racine, Rock, Walworth, & Waukesha counties
John Winans (Janesville)	Democratic	March 4, 1883 – March 3, 1885	48th	Elected in 1882. Retired to run for mayor of Janesville.	Jefferson, Kenosha, Racine, Rock, & Walworth counties
Lucien B. Caswell (Fort Atkinson)	Republican	March 4, 1885 – March 3, 1891	49th 50th 51st	Elected in 1884. Re-elected in 1886. Re-elected in 1888. Lost renomination.	Jefferson, Kenosha, Racine, Rock, & Walworth counties
Clinton Babbitt (Beloit)	Democratic	March 4, 1891 – March 3, 1893	52nd	Elected in 1890. Lost re-election.	Jefferson, Kenosha, Racine, Rock, & Walworth counties
Henry Allen Cooper (Racine)	Republican	March 4, 1893 – March 3, 1919	53rd 54th 55th 56th 57th 58th 59th 60th 61st 62nd 63rd 64th 65th	Elected in 1892. Re-elected in 1894. Re-elected in 1896. Re-elected in 1898. Re-elected in 1900. Re-elected in 1902. Re-elected in 1904. Re-elected in 1906. Re-elected in 1908. Re-elected in 1910. Re-elected in 1912. Re-elected in 1914. Re-elected in 1916. Lost renomination and lost re-election as an independent.	Green, Kenosha, Lafayette, Racine, Rock, & Walworth counties
Henry Allen Cooper (Racine)	Republican	March 4, 1893 – March 3, 1919	53rd 54th 55th 56th 57th 58th 59th 60th 61st 62nd 63rd 64th 65th	Elected in 1892. Re-elected in 1894. Re-elected in 1896. Re-elected in 1898. Re-elected in 1900. Re-elected in 1902. Re-elected in 1904. Re-elected in 1906. Re-elected in 1908. Re-elected in 1910. Re-elected in 1912. Re-elected in 1914. Re-elected in 1916. Lost renomination and lost re-election as an independent.	Green, Kenosha, Lafayette, Racine, Rock, & Walworth counties
Henry Allen Cooper (Racine)	Republican	March 4, 1893 – March 3, 1919	53rd 54th 55th 56th 57th 58th 59th 60th 61st 62nd 63rd 64th 65th	Elected in 1892. Re-elected in 1894. Re-elected in 1896. Re-elected in 1898. Re-elected in 1900. Re-elected in 1902. Re-elected in 1904. Re-elected in 1906. Re-elected in 1908. Re-elected in 1910. Re-elected in 1912. Re-elected in 1914. Re-elected in 1916. Lost renomination and lost re-election as an independent.	Kenosha, Racine, Rock, Walworth, & Waukesha counties
Clifford E. Randall (Kenosha)	Republican	March 4, 1919 – March 3, 1921	66th	Elected in 1918. Lost renomination.	Kenosha, Racine, Rock, Walworth, & Waukesha counties
Henry Allen Cooper (Racine)	Republican	March 4, 1921 – March 1, 1931	67th 68th 69th 70th 71st	Elected in 1920. Re-elected in 1922. Re-elected in 1924. Re-elected in 1926. Re-elected in 1928. Re-elected in 1930 but died before next term began.	Kenosha, Racine, Rock, Walworth, & Waukesha counties
Vacant		March 1, 1931 – October 13, 1931	71st 72nd		Kenosha, Racine, Rock, Walworth, & Waukesha counties
Thomas Ryum Amlie (Elkhorn)	Republican	October 13, 1931 – March 3, 1933	72nd	Elected to finish Cooper's term. Lost renomination.	Kenosha, Racine, Rock, Walworth, & Waukesha counties
George Washington Blanchard (Edgerton)	Republican	March 4, 1933 – January 3, 1935	73rd	Elected in 1932. Renominated but withdrew prior to election.	Green, Kenosha, Racine, Rock, & Walworth counties
Thomas Ryum Amlie (Elkhorn)	Progressive	January 3, 1935 – January 3, 1939	74th 75th	Elected in 1934. Re-elected in 1936. Retired to run for U.S. senator.	Green, Kenosha, Racine, Rock, & Walworth counties
Stephen Bolles (Janesville)	Republican	January 3, 1939 – July 8, 1941	76th 77th	Elected in 1938. Re-elected in 1940. Died.	Green, Kenosha, Racine, Rock, & Walworth counties
Vacant		July 8, 1941 – August 29, 1941	77th		Green, Kenosha, Racine, Rock, & Walworth counties
Lawrence H. Smith (Racine)	Republican	August 29, 1941 – January 22, 1958	77th 78th 79th 80th 81st 82nd 83rd 84th 85th	Elected to finish Bolles's term. Re-elected in 1942. Re-elected in 1944. Re-elected in 1946. Re-elected in 1948. Re-elected in 1950. Re-elected in 1952. Re-elected in 1954. Re-elected in 1956. Died.	Green, Kenosha, Racine, Rock, & Walworth counties
Vacant		January 22, 1958 – January 3, 1959	85th		Green, Kenosha, Racine, Rock, & Walworth counties
Gerald T. Flynn (Racine)	Democratic	January 3, 1959 – January 3, 1961	86th	Elected in 1958. Lost re-election.	Green, Kenosha, Racine, Rock, & Walworth counties
Henry C. Schadeberg (Burlington)	Republican	January 3, 1961 – January 3, 1965	87th 88th	Elected in 1960. Re-elected in 1962. Lost re-election.	Green, Kenosha, Racine, Rock, & Walworth counties
Lynn E. Stalbaum (Racine)	Democratic	January 3, 1965 – January 3, 1967	89th	Elected in 1964. Lost re-election.	Kenosha, Racine, Rock, & Walworth counties
Henry C. Schadeberg (Burlington)	Republican	January 3, 1967 – January 3, 1971	90th 91st	Elected in 1966. Re-elected in 1968. Lost re-election.	Kenosha, Racine, Rock, & Walworth counties
Les Aspin (East Troy)	Democratic	January 3, 1971 – January 20, 1993	92nd 93rd 94th 95th 96th 97th 98th 99th 100th 101st 102nd 103rd	Elected in 1970. Re-elected in 1972. Re-elected in 1974. Re-elected in 1976. Re-elected in 1978. Re-elected in 1980. Re-elected in 1982. Re-elected in 1984. Re-elected in 1986. Re-elected in 1988. Re-elected in 1990. Re-elected in 1992. Resigned to become U.S. Secretary of Defense.	Kenosha, Racine, Rock, & Walworth counties
Les Aspin (East Troy)	Democratic	January 3, 1971 – January 20, 1993	92nd 93rd 94th 95th 96th 97th 98th 99th 100th 101st 102nd 103rd	Elected in 1970. Re-elected in 1972. Re-elected in 1974. Re-elected in 1976. Re-elected in 1978. Re-elected in 1980. Re-elected in 1982. Re-elected in 1984. Re-elected in 1986. Re-elected in 1988. Re-elected in 1990. Re-elected in 1992. Resigned to become U.S. Secretary of Defense.	Kenosha, Racine, Rock, & Walworth counties & eastern Green County & part of Jefferson County: Green County; Town of Albany; Town of Spring Grove; Village of Albany; City of Brodhead; Jefferson County; City of Whitewater
Les Aspin (East Troy)	Democratic	January 3, 1971 – January 20, 1993	92nd 93rd 94th 95th 96th 97th 98th 99th 100th 101st 102nd 103rd	Elected in 1970. Re-elected in 1972. Re-elected in 1974. Re-elected in 1976. Re-elected in 1978. Re-elected in 1980. Re-elected in 1982. Re-elected in 1984. Re-elected in 1986. Re-elected in 1988. Re-elected in 1990. Re-elected in 1992. Resigned to become U.S. Secretary of Defense.	Kenosha, Racine, Rock, & Walworth counties & eastern Green County & part of Jefferson County: Green County; Town of Albany; Town of Brooklyn; Town of Cadiz; Town of Clarno; Town of Decatur; Town of Exeter; Town of Jefferson; Town of Mt. Pleasant; Town of Spring Grove; Village of Albany; Village of Browntown; Village of Monticello; City of Brodhead; Jefferson County; City of Whitewater
Vacant		January 20, 1993 – May 4, 1993	103rd		1993–2003
Peter W. Barca (Kenosha)	Democratic	May 4, 1993 – January 3, 1995	103rd	Elected to finish Aspin's term. Lost re-election.	1993–2003
Mark Neumann (Janesville)	Republican	January 3, 1995 – January 3, 1999	104th 105th	Elected in 1994. Re-elected in 1996. Retired to run for U.S. senator.	1993–2003
Paul Ryan (Janesville)	Republican	January 3, 1999 – January 3, 2019	106th 107th 108th 109th 110th 111th 112th 113th 114th 115th	Elected in 1998. Re-elected in 2000. Re-elected in 2002. Re-elected in 2004. Re-elected in 2006. Re-elected in 2008. Re-elected in 2010. Re-elected in 2012. Re-elected in 2014. Re-elected in 2016. Retired.	1993–2003
Paul Ryan (Janesville)	Republican	January 3, 1999 – January 3, 2019	106th 107th 108th 109th 110th 111th 112th 113th 114th 115th	Elected in 1998. Re-elected in 2000. Re-elected in 2002. Re-elected in 2004. Re-elected in 2006. Re-elected in 2008. Re-elected in 2010. Re-elected in 2012. Re-elected in 2014. Re-elected in 2016. Retired.	2003–2013
Paul Ryan (Janesville)	Republican	January 3, 1999 – January 3, 2019	106th 107th 108th 109th 110th 111th 112th 113th 114th 115th	Elected in 1998. Re-elected in 2000. Re-elected in 2002. Re-elected in 2004. Re-elected in 2006. Re-elected in 2008. Re-elected in 2010. Re-elected in 2012. Re-elected in 2014. Re-elected in 2016. Retired.	2013–2023
Bryan Steil (Janesville)	Republican	January 3, 2019 – present	116th 117th 118th 119th	Elected in 2018. Re-elected in 2020. Re-elected in 2022. Re-elected in 2024. Lost re-election.	2013–2023
Bryan Steil (Janesville)	Republican	January 3, 2019 – present	116th 117th 118th 119th	Elected in 2018. Re-elected in 2020. Re-elected in 2022. Re-elected in 2024. Lost re-election.	2023–present
Mitchell Berman (Raymond)	Democratic	Assuming office on January 3, 2027		Elected in 2026.	2023–present

== Electoral history ==
=== 2002 district boundaries (2002–2011) ===
Year	Date	Elected				Defeated				Total	Plurality
2002	Nov. 5	Paul Ryan (inc)	Republican	140,176	67.19%	Jeffrey C. Thomas	Dem.	63,895	30.63%	208,613	76,281
2002	Nov. 5	Paul Ryan (inc)	Republican	140,176	67.19%	George Meyers	Lib.	4,406	2.11%	208,613	76,281
2004	Nov. 2	Paul Ryan (inc)	Republican	233,372	65.37%	Jeffrey C. Thomas	Dem.	116,250	32.57%	356,976	117,122
2004	Nov. 2	Paul Ryan (inc)	Republican	233,372	65.37%	Norman Aulabaugh	Ind.	4,252	1.19%	356,976	117,122
2004	Nov. 2	Paul Ryan (inc)	Republican	233,372	65.37%	Don Bernau	Lib.	2,936	0.82%	356,976	117,122
2006	Nov. 7	Paul Ryan (inc)	Republican	161,320	62.63%	Jeffrey C. Thomas	Dem.	95,761	37.17%	257,596	65,559
2008	Nov. 4	Paul Ryan (inc)	Republican	231,009	63.97%	Marge Krupp	Dem.	125,268	34.69%	361,107	105,741
2008	Nov. 4	Paul Ryan (inc)	Republican	231,009	63.97%	Joseph Kexel	Lib.	4,606	1.28%	361,107	105,741
2010	Nov. 2	Paul Ryan (inc)	Republican	179,819	68.21%	John Heckenlively	Dem.	79,363	30.10%	263,627	100,456
2010	Nov. 2	Paul Ryan (inc)	Republican	179,819	68.21%	Joseph Kexel	Lib.	4,311	1.64%	263,627	100,456

=== 2011 district boundaries (2012–2021) ===
Year	Date	Elected				Defeated				Total	Plurality
2012	Nov. 6	Paul Ryan (inc)	Republican	200,423	54.90%	Rob Zerban	Dem.	158,414	43.39%	365,058	42,009
2012	Nov. 6	Paul Ryan (inc)	Republican	200,423	54.90%	Keith Deschler	Ind.	6,054	1.66%	365,058	42,009
2014	Nov. 4	Paul Ryan (inc)	Republican	182,316	63.27%	Rob Zerban	Dem.	105,552	36.63%	288,170	76,764
2014	Nov. 4	Paul Ryan (inc)	Republican	182,316	63.27%	Keith Deschler (write-in)	Ind.	29	0.01%	288,170	76,764
2016	Nov. 8	Paul Ryan (inc)	Republican	230,072	64.95%	Ryan Solen	Dem.	107,003	30.21%	354,245	123,069
2016	Nov. 8	Paul Ryan (inc)	Republican	230,072	64.95%	Spencer Zimmerman	Ind.	9,429	2.66%	354,245	123,069
2016	Nov. 8	Paul Ryan (inc)	Republican	230,072	64.95%	Jason Lebeck	Lib.	7,486	2.11%	354,245	123,069
2018	Nov. 6	Bryan Steil	Republican	177,492	54.56%	Randy Bryce	Dem.	137,508	42.27%	325,317	39,984
2018	Nov. 6	Bryan Steil	Republican	177,492	54.56%	Ken Yorgan	Ind.	10,006	3.08%	325,317	39,984
2018	Nov. 6	Bryan Steil	Republican	177,492	54.56%	Joseph Kexel (write-in)	Ind.	7	0.00%	325,317	39,984
2020	Nov. 3	Bryan Steil (inc)	Republican	238,271	59.31%	Roger Polack	Dem.	163,170	40.61%	401,754	75,101

=== 2022 district boundaries (2022–2031) ===
Year	Date	Elected				Defeated				Total	Plurality
2022	Nov. 8	Bryan Steil (inc)	Republican	162,610	54.05%	Ann Roe	Dem.	135,825	45.14%	300,867	26,785
2022	Nov. 8	Bryan Steil (inc)	Republican	162,610	54.05%	Charles E. Barman	Ind.	2,247	0.75%	300,867	26,785
2024	Nov. 5	Bryan Steil (inc)	Republican	212,515	54.0%	Peter Barca	Dem.	172,402	43.8%	393,493	
2024	Nov. 5	Bryan Steil (inc)	Republican	212,515	54.0%	Chester Todd Jr.	Green	8,191	2.1%	393,493	
2024	Nov. 5	Bryan Steil (inc)	Republican	212,515	54.0%	Write-in	Ind.	385	0.1%	393,493	

U.S. House of Representatives
Preceded by Ohio's 8th congressional district	Home district of the speaker October 29, 2015 – January 3, 2019	Succeeded by California's 12th congressional district
