= Lucien B. Caswell =

American politician (1827–1919)

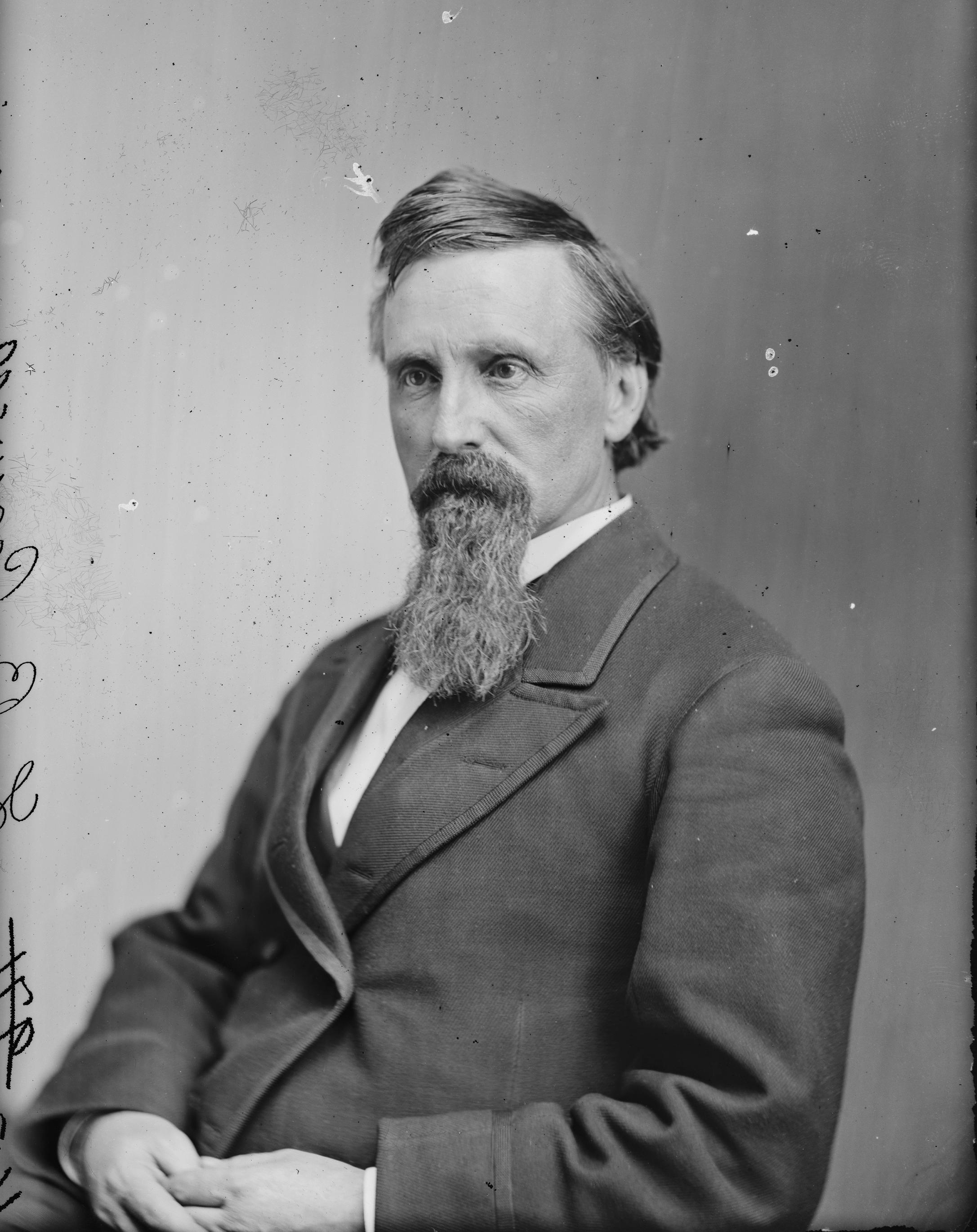

Member of the U.S. House of Representatives from Wisconsin
- In office March 4, 1885 – March 3, 1891
- Preceded by: John Winans
- Succeeded by: Clinton Babbitt
- Constituency: 1st congressional district
- In office March 4, 1875 – March 3, 1883
- Preceded by: Gerry Whiting Hazelton
- Succeeded by: Daniel H. Sumner
- Constituency: 2nd congressional district

Member of the Wisconsin State Assembly from the Jefferson 3rd district
- In office January 5, 1874 – January 4, 1875
- Preceded by: James W. Ostrander
- Succeeded by: James W. Ostrander
- In office January 1, 1872 – January 6, 1873
- Preceded by: Nelson Fryer
- Succeeded by: James W. Ostrander
- In office January 5, 1863 – January 4, 1864
- Preceded by: William W. Reed
- Succeeded by: Joseph Powers

District Attorney of Jefferson County, Wisconsin
- In office January 1, 1855 – January 5, 1857
- Preceded by: William Dutcher
- Succeeded by: Daniel Hall

Personal details
- Born: November 27, 1827 Swanton, Vermont, U.S.
- Died: April 26, 1919 (aged 91) Fort Atkinson, Wisconsin, U.S.
- Resting place: Evergreen Cemetery, Fort Atkinson, Wisconsin
- Party: Republican
- Spouse: Anna (Rogers)

Lucien Bonaparte Caswell (November 27, 1827 – April 26, 1919) was an American lawyer, Republican politician, and Wisconsin pioneer. He served 14 years in the U.S. House of Representatives between 1875 and 1891, representing parts of southeast Wisconsin. Before his time in Congress, he served as district attorney of Jefferson County, Wisconsin, and represented the Fort Atkinson area for three terms in the Wisconsin State Assembly.

== Biography ==
Lucien Bonaparte Caswell was born in Swanton, Vermont, on November 27, 1827. When he was nine, he moved with his family to the frontier Wisconsin Territory and settled along the Rock River, just south of Lake Koshkonong. Caswell attended Milton Academy and took a course at Beloit College in Beloit, Wisconsin. He began to study law in Beloit with the practice of future U.S. senator Matthew H. Carpenter. Caswell was admitted to the bar in October 1851. He moved to Fort Atkinson later that year, where he opened a law practice.

In 1854, Caswell was appointed the district attorney of Jefferson County. Caswell was elected to the Wisconsin State Assembly in 1863, 1872, and 1874. He founded the First National Bank of Fort Atkinson in 1863 and served as cashier for twenty-five years. He was with Governor Louis P. Harvey on his fatal trip to visit Wisconsin troops in Tennessee. Caswell was selected as a delegate to the 1868 Republican National Convention and supported Ulysses S. Grant.

Caswell served seven terms in the United States House of Representatives as a Republican. He was first elected in 1874 to the 44th Congress, defeating Democrat Amasa G. Cook by 217 votes. He represented Wisconsin's 2nd congressional district, covering Columbia, Dane, Jefferson, and Sauk counties. Caswell was subsequently elected to the 45th, 46th and 47th Congresses serving from March 4, 1875 to March 3, 1883. In 1885, he founded the Citizens' State Bank of Fort Atkinson. He was once again elected to the 49th and subsequent congresses through to the 51st Congress however this time representing Wisconsin's 1st congressional district from March 4, 1885, to March 3, 1891. As a representative, he was active in establishing the Federal appeals court system and overseeing the construction of the Library of Congress. Caswell was defeated in the Republican primaries in 1890 by state senator Henry Allen Cooper, who was defeated in the general election by Clinton Babbitt.

After his time in Congress, Caswell returned to Fort Atkinson to practice law. He died there on April 26, 1919, and was buried in Evergreen Cemetery.

Wisconsin State Assembly
Preceded by William W. Reed	Member of the Wisconsin State Assembly from the Jefferson 3rd district January 5, 1863 – January 4, 1864	Succeeded by Joseph Powers
Preceded by Nelson Fryer	Member of the Wisconsin State Assembly from the Jefferson 3rd district January 1, 1872 – January 6, 1873	Succeeded by James W. Ostrander
Preceded by James W. Ostrander	Member of the Wisconsin State Assembly from the Jefferson 3rd district January 5, 1874 – January 4, 1875	Succeeded by James W. Ostrander
U.S. House of Representatives
Preceded by Gerry Whiting Hazelton	Member of the U.S. House of Representatives from Wisconsin's 2nd congressional district March 4, 1875 – March 3, 1883	Succeeded by Daniel H. Sumner
Preceded by John Winans	Member of the U.S. House of Representatives from Wisconsin's 1st congressional district March 4, 1885 – March 3, 1891	Succeeded by Clinton Babbitt
Legal offices
Preceded by William Dutcher	District Attorney of Jefferson County, Wisconsin; January 1, 1855 – January 5, 1857	Succeeded by Daniel Hall
