= Joel H. Cooper (Wisconsin politician) =

American politician

Joel Henry Cooper (April 20, 1821 – September 4, 1893) was an American physician, pharmacist and abolitionist from Wisconsin who served as a Free Soil Party member of the Wisconsin State Assembly. He was the father of Congressman Henry Allen Cooper.

== Background ==
Cooper was born in Windsor County, Vermont on April 20, 1821. He studied three years (1840–43) at Wesleyan University, but left during his senior year. In 1844 he moved to Illinois, then in May 1845 to Spring Prairie, Wisconsin, where he ran a pharmacy and studied medicine under Dr. Jesse Carr Mills of that town, eventually going into medical practice with Mills. He married Persi E. Allen of Spring Prairie, who was a niece of Mills. Henry (called "Hal" in his youth) was born September 8, 1850, the first of what would eventually be six children, and their only son.

== Public affairs ==
Cooper was a member of the Assembly in 1852, succeeding fellow Freesoiler Adam E. Ray. He was not a candidate for re-election, and was succeeded by Oscar Bartlett (another Freesoiler).

Instead, the Coopers moved to Burlington in Racine County with their son Henry, where Cooper started a new medical practice and remained in the pharmacy trade. The house into which they moved had been built by an abolitionist named Silas Peck, with features to help it serve as a station on the Underground Railroad. Soon after the Coopers moved in, it was used to shelter fugitive slave Joshua Glover on his way to Canada. The house was still standing in the 21st century.

Cooper became active in politics in his new home town. He was appointed postmaster of Burlington (a patronage position) by Abraham Lincoln in 1861, now that the Republican Party had won the Presidency (like most Wisconsin Freesoilers, Cooper had joined the new Republican Party upon its formation). He held that office until resigning in 1874.

== Later life ==
Cooper retired from medicine in the early 1880s. He died at his home in Burlington on September 4, 1893, having lived long enough to see his son (like him, a Republican) elected to the United States House of Representatives from their district on the previous November.
