= 1910 United States House of Representatives elections in Wisconsin =

- November 8, 1910

All 11 Wisconsin seats to the United States House of Representatives
	Majority party	Minority party	Third party
Party	Republican	Democratic	Social-Democratic
Last election	10	1	0
Seats won	8	2	1
Seat change	▼2	▲1	▲1
Popular vote	141,896	88,091	40,053
Percentage	46.75%	29.03%	13.20%
- District results Republican: 30–40% 50–60% 60–70% 80–90% Democrat: 40–50% 50–60% Social-Democrat: 40–50%

The 1910 congressional elections in Wisconsin were held on November 8, 1910, to determine who would represent the state of Wisconsin in the United States House of Representatives. Representatives were elected for two-year terms; those elected served in the 62nd Congress from March 4, 1911, until March 4, 1913. The election coincided with the 1910 Wisconsin gubernatorial election. Wisconsin had eleven congressional districts at the time. It was held as part of the 1910 United States House of Representatives elections.

== Overview ==
1910 United States House of Representatives elections in Wisconsin
Party	Votes	Percentage	Seats	+/–
Republican	141,896	46.75	8	▼2
Democratic	88,091	29.03	2	▲1
Social-Democratic	40,053	13.20	1	▲1
Prohibition Party	3,013	0.99	0	–
Totals	303,499	100	11	—

== District 1 ==
1910 Wisconsin's 1st congressional district election
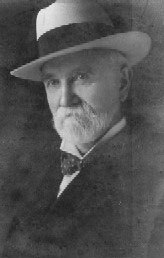

Nominee	Henry Allen Cooper	Calvin Stewart	Michael Yabs
Party	Republican	Democratic	Social-Democratic
Popular vote	15,096	172,402	1,869
Percentage	57.4%	43.8%	7.1%
U.S. Representative before election
Henry Allen Cooper
Republican
Elected U.S. Representative
Henry Allen Cooper
Republican

The 1st district spanned Green, Kenosha, Lafayette, Racine, Rock, and Walworth counties. The incumbent was Republican Henry Allen Cooper who was re-elected in the 1st congressional district with 60.6% of the vote in 1908.

1910 Wisconsin's 1st congressional district election
Party	Candidate	Votes	%
Republican	Henry Allen Cooper (incumbent)	15,096	57.42
Democratic	Calvin Stewart	8,506	32.35
Social-Democratic	Michael Yabs	1,869	7.11
Prohibition	Hans O. Moe	820	3.12
Total votes		26,291	100
Republican hold			

== District 2 ==
Incumbent Republican John M. Nelson was re-elected in the second congressional district.

The 2nd district represented portions of Adams, Columbia, Dane, Green Lake, Jefferson, and Marquette counties.

1910 Wisconsin's 2nd congressional district election
Party	Candidate	Votes	%
Republican	John M. Nelson (incumbent)	14,009	51.51
Democratic	Albert G. Schmedeman	12,090	44.45
Social-Democratic	Francis L. Cook	865	3.18
Prohibition	J. Burrit Smith	234	0.86
Total votes		27,198	100
Republican hold			

== District 3 ==
Incumbent Republican Arthur W. Kopp was re-elected in the 3rd congressional district.

The 3rd district represented portions of Crawford, Grant, Iowa, Juneau, Richland, Sauk, Vernon counties.

1910 Wisconsin's 3rd congressional district election
Party	Candidate	Votes	%
Republican	Arthur W. Kopp (incumbent)	13,310	57.44
Democratic	William N. Coffland	9,042	39.02
Prohibition	Charles H. Berryman	821	3.54
Total votes		23,173	100
Republican hold			

== District 4 ==
Incumbent Republican William J. Cary was re-elected in the 4th congressional district.

The 4th district represented areas entirely in Milwaukee County. This included portions of the 2nd, 3rd, 4th, 5th, 7th, 8th, 11th, 12th, 14th, 15th, 16th, 17th, and, 23rd wards of Milwaukee, as well as portions of the municipalities of Wauwatosa (both the town and city), South Milwaukee, Cudahy, Lake, Oak Creek, Franklin, and Greenfield.

1910 Wisconsin's 4th congressional district election
Party	Candidate	Votes	%
Republican	William J. Cary (incumbent)	12,261	38.04
Social-Democratic	Winfield R. Gaylord	11,814	36.66
Democratic	William J. Kershaw	8,081	25.07
Prohibition	James M. Skinner	74	2.61
Total votes		32,230	100
Republican hold			

== District 5 ==
Social-Democratic nominee Victor L. Berger won election in the 5th congressional district. The incumbent Republican, William H. Stafford, had lost re-nomination.

The 5th district represented areas of Waukesha County and Milwaukee County. Areas of Milwaukee County in the district included portions of the 1st, 6th, 9th, 10th, 13th, 18th, 19th, 20th, 21st, and 22nd wards of the city of Milwaukee; the Town of Milwaukee; as well as portions of the municipalities of North Milwaukee, Whitefish Bay, East Milwaukee, Granville, Wisconsin.

1910 Wisconsin's 5th congressional district election
Party	Candidate	Votes	%
Social-Democratic	Victor L. Berger	13,497	44.71
Republican	Henry F. Cochems	13,147	43.55
Democratic	Joseph P. Carney	8,433	27.94
Prohibition	M. A. Schmeyer	108	0.36
Total votes		30,185	100
Social-Democratic gain from Republican			

== District 6 ==
Democratic nominee Michael E. Burke won election in the 6th congressional district. The incumbent Democrat, Charles H. Weisse, did not seek re-election.

The 5th district represented areas of Dodge, Fond du Lac, Ozaukee, Sheboygan, and Washington counties.

1910 Wisconsin's 6th congressional district election
Party	Candidate	Votes	%
Democratic	Michael E. Burke	15,759	51.02
Republican	William H. Froelich	13,278	42.98
Social-Democratic	John C. Bell	1,705	5.52
Prohibition	George C. Bell	148	0.48
Total votes		30,890	100
Democratic hold			

== District 7 ==
Incumbent Republican John J. Esch was re-elected in the 7th congressional district.

The 7th district represented portions of Buffalo, Clark, Eau Claire, Jackson, La Crosse County, Monroe, Pepin, Trempealeau counties.

1910 Wisconsin's 7th congressional district election
Party	Candidate	Votes	%
Republican	John J. Esch (incumbent)	15,365	63.05
Democratic	Paul W. Mahoney	7,365	30.22
Social-Democratic	John Marquet	1,180	4.84
Prohibition	A. A. Merrill	458	1.88
Total votes		24,368	100
Republican hold			

== District 8 ==
Incumbent Republican James H. Davidson was re-elected in the 8th congressional district.

The 8th district represented portions of Calumet, Manitowoc, Portage, Waupaca County, Waushara County, and Winnebago counties.

1910 Wisconsin's 8th congressional district election
Party	Candidate	Votes	%
Republican	James H. Davidson (incumbent)	15,936	55.23
Democratic	Fred B. Rawson	10,654	36.92
Social-Democratic	Richard W. Burke	1,990	6.90
Prohibition	Charles H. Velte	276	0.96
Total votes		28,856	100
Republican hold			

== District 9 ==
Democratic nominee Thomas F. Konop was elected in the 9th congressional district, very narrowly unseating Republican incumbent Gustav Küstermann.

The 9th district represented portions of Brown, Door, Kewaunee, Marinette County, Oconto County, Outagamie counties.

1910 Wisconsin's 9th congressional district election
Party	Candidate	Votes	%
Democratic	Thomas F. Konop	12,140	46.47
Republican	Gustav Küstermann (incumbent)	12,133	46.44
Social-Democratic	Thomas J. Oliver	1,777	6.80
Prohibition	Alexander McEathron	74	0.28
Total votes		26,124	100
Democratic gain from Republican			

== District 10 ==
Incumbent Republican Elmer A. Morse was re-elected in the 10th congressional district.

The 4th district represented portions of Ashland, Florence, Forest, Iron, Langlade, Lincoln, Marathon, Oneida, Price, Shawano, Taylor, Vilas, and Wood counties.

1910 Wisconsin's 10th congressional district election
Party	Candidate	Votes	%
Republican	Elmer A. Morse (incumbent)	17,360	54.18
Democratic	John F. Lamont	11,780	36.77
Social-Democratic	Lynn Thompson	2,882	9.00
Total votes		32,040	100
Republican hold			

== District 11 ==
Incumbent Republican Irvine Lenroot was re-elected in the 11th congressional district.

The 4th district represented portions of Barron, Bayfield, Burnett, Chippewa, Douglas, Dunn, Pierce, Polk, Rusk, St. Croix, Sawyer, and Washburn, counties.

1910 Wisconsin's 11th congressional district election
Party	Candidate	Votes	%
Republican	Irvine Lenroot (incumbent)	19,670	88.83
Social-Democratic	Henry M. Parks	2,474	11.17
Total votes		22,144	100
Republican hold			

Preceded by 1908	United States House elections in Wisconsin; 1910	Succeeded by 1912
