= Troy Center, Wisconsin =

- Unincorporated community
- Location within Wisconsin Location within the United States
- Coordinates: 42°48′35″N 88°27′54″W
- Country: United States
- State: Wisconsin
- County: Walworth
- Elevation: 889 ft (271 m)
- Time zone: UTC-6 (Central (CST))
  - Summer (DST): UTC-5 (CDT)
- Zip: 53180
- Area code: 262
- GNIS feature ID: 1575689

Troy Center is an unincorporated community located in the town of Troy, in Walworth County, Wisconsin, United States. Troy Center is 3.5 miles (5.6 km) west-northwest of East Troy.

== Notable people ==
- Clifford E. Randall, educator and politician
