= Clinton Babbitt =

American politician (1831–1907)

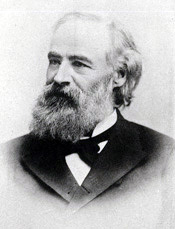

Member of the U.S. House of Representatives from Wisconsin's 1st district
- In office March 4, 1891 – March 3, 1893
- Preceded by: Lucien B. Caswell
- Succeeded by: Henry A. Cooper

Personal details
- Born: November 16, 1831 Westmoreland, New Hampshire, U.S.
- Died: March 11, 1907 (aged 75) Beloit, Wisconsin, U.S.
- Resting place: Oakwood Cemetery, Beloit
- Party: Democratic
- Spouse: Sarah S. Johnson (m. 1857–1907)
- Children: 10
- Occupation: Farmer

Clinton Babbitt (November 16, 1831 – March 11, 1907) was an American farmer, Democratic politician, and Wisconsin pioneer. He served one term in the U.S. House of Representatives, representing Wisconsin's 1st congressional district during the 52nd Congress (1891–1893). He was also a member of the first city council for the city of Beloit, Wisconsin, and was a leading member of the state agricultural society for many years.

== Biography ==
Born in Westmoreland, New Hampshire, Babbitt attended the common schools and was graduated from Keene (New Hampshire) Academy. He moved to Wisconsin in 1853 and settled near Beloit in Rock County. He engaged in agricultural pursuits.

Babbitt was elected a member of the first city council of Beloit. He was an unsuccessful Democratic candidate for election in 1880 to the Forty-seventh Congress. He was appointed postmaster of Beloit by President Cleveland on August 2, 1886, and served until August 17, 1889, when a successor was appointed. He was appointed secretary of the state agricultural society of Wisconsin in 1885 and served until 1899.

Babbitt was elected as a Democrat to the Fifty-second Congress (March 4, 1891 – March 4, 1893) and represented Wisconsin's 1st congressional district. He was an unsuccessful candidate for reelection in 1892 to the Fifty-third Congress.

He retired from public life and active business pursuits and resided in Beloit until his death on March 11, 1907. He was interred in Beloit's Oakwood Cemetery.

U.S. House of Representatives
| Preceded by Lucien B. Caswell | Member of the U.S. House of Representatives from Wisconsin's 1st congressional district March 4, 1891 – March 3, 1893 | Succeeded by Henry A. Cooper |
