= Daniel H. Sumner =

American politician (1837–1903)

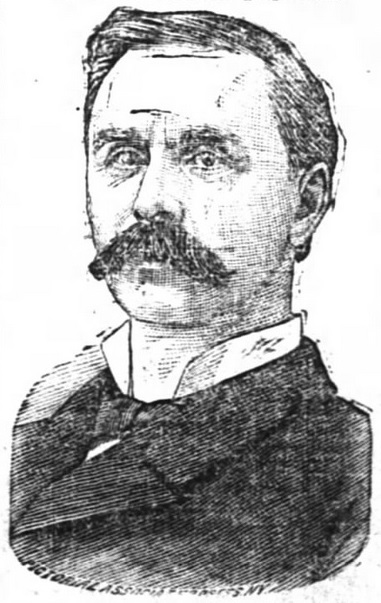
- The Daily Inter Ocean (Chicago, IL), February 4, 1884.

Member of the U.S. House of Representatives from Wisconsin's 2nd district
- In office March 4, 1883 – March 3, 1885
- Preceded by: Lucien B. Caswell
- Succeeded by: Edward S. Bragg

Personal details
- Born: September 15, 1837 Malone, New York, U.S.
- Died: May 29, 1903 (aged 65) Waukesha, Wisconsin, U.S.
- Resting place: Prairie Home Cemetery, Waukesha
- Party: Democratic
- Spouses: Minerva Cynthia Webster (m. 1858; div. 1870); Terrie Meahl Nelson (m. 1878–1903)
- Children: Daniel Webster Sumner; (b. 1860; died 1949)
- Profession: Lawyer

Daniel Hadley Sumner (September 15, 1837 – May 29, 1903) was an American lawyer and Democratic politician from Waukesha, Wisconsin. He served one term in the U.S. House of Representatives, representing Wisconsin's 2nd congressional district for the 48th Congress (1883–1885). He also served as a county supervisor and district attorney for Waukesha County, Wisconsin.

== Biography ==
Born in Malone, New York, Sumner moved to Michigan in 1843 with his parents, who settled in Richland, Michigan. He attended the common schools, and Prairie Seminary, in Richland. He studied law. He was then admitted to the bar in 1868, and commenced practice in Kalamazoo, Michigan. He moved to Oconomowoc, Wisconsin in 1868 and practiced law. He also published the La Belle Mirror. He moved to Waukesha, Wisconsin in 1870, and continued the practicing law. He also became the town's superintendent of schools. He served as a member of the county board of supervisors. He served as district attorney of Waukesha County in 1876 and 1877.

Sumner was elected as a Democrat to the Forty-eighth Congress (March 4, 1883 – March 3, 1885). He represented Wisconsin's 2nd congressional district. He was not a candidate for renomination in 1884. Afterwards he resumed the practice of law. He died in Waukesha, Wisconsin on May 29, 1903. He was interred in Prairie Home Cemetery.

U.S. House of Representatives
Preceded by Lucien B. Caswell	Member of the U.S. House of Representatives from Wisconsin's 2nd congressional district 1883-1885	Succeeded by Edward S. Bragg
