= Clifford E. Randall =

American politician (1876–1934)

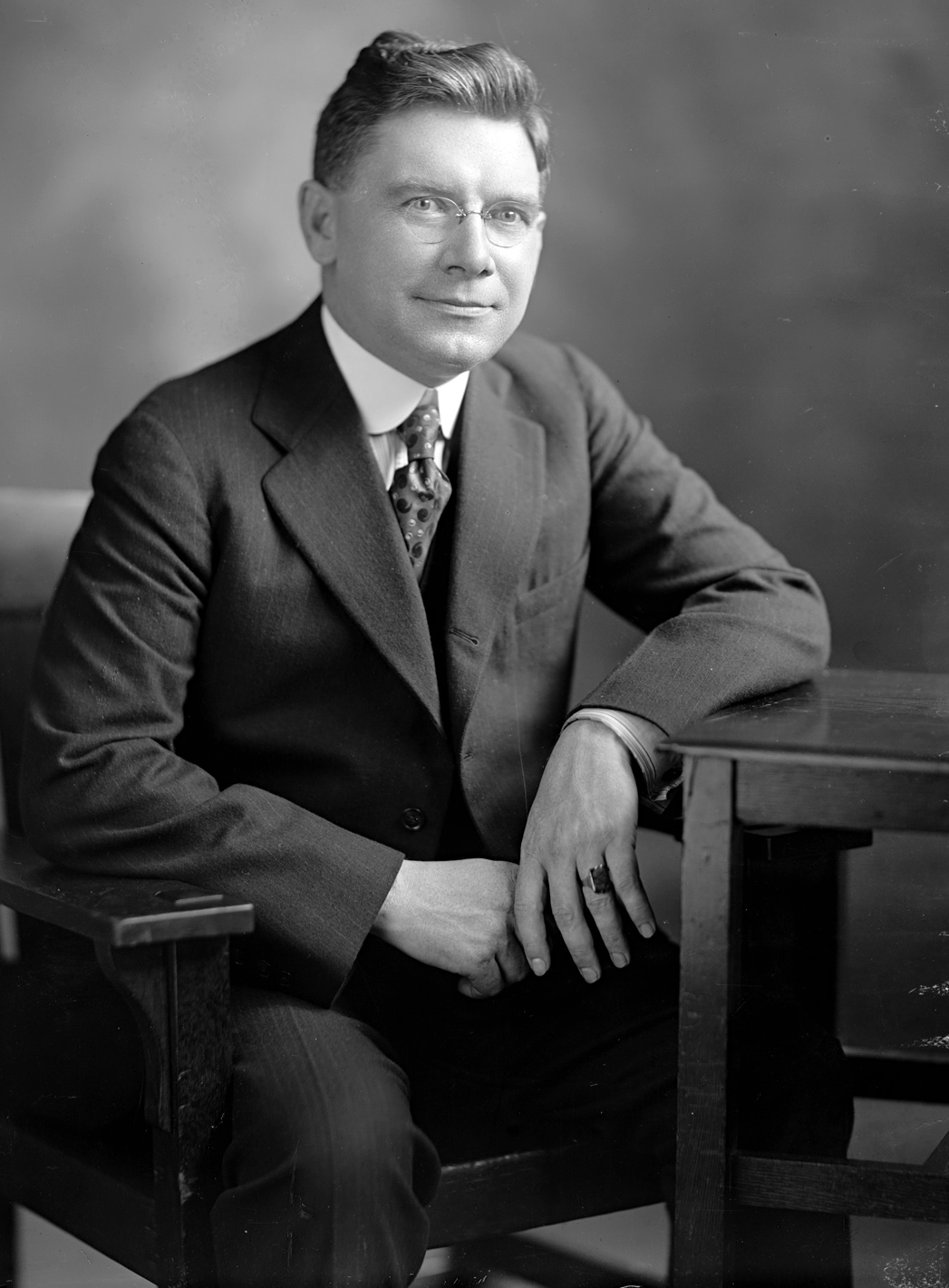

Member of the U.S. House of Representatives from Wisconsin's 1st district
- In office March 4, 1919 – March 3, 1921
- Preceded by: Henry A. Cooper
- Succeeded by: Henry A. Cooper

Personal details
- Born: December 25, 1876 Troy Center, Wisconsin, U.S.
- Died: October 16, 1934 (aged 57) Kenosha, Wisconsin, U.S.
- Resting place: Green Ridge Cemetery, Kenosha
- Party: Republican
- Spouse: Dell Sharpe McCall (m. 1909–1934)
- Profession: Lawyer

Clifford Ellsworth Randall (December 25, 1876 – October 16, 1934) was an American lawyer and Republican politician from Kenosha, Wisconsin. He served one term in the U.S. House of Representatives, representing Wisconsin's 1st congressional district for the 66th Congress (1919–1921).

== Biography ==
Born in Troy Center, Wisconsin, Randall attended the public schools. He was graduated from the public high school of East Troy, Wisconsin, in 1894 and from the Whitewater Normal School in 1901. He taught school at Lake Beulah, Troy Center, and Rochester, Wisconsin. He was graduated from the law department of the University of Wisconsin–Madison in 1906. He was admitted to the bar the same year and commenced the practice of law in Kenosha, Wisconsin, judge of the municipal court from 1909 to 1917.

Randall was elected as a Republican to the Sixty-sixth Congress (March 4, 1919 – March 3, 1921) representing Wisconsin's 1st congressional district. He was an unsuccessful candidate for renomination in 1920. He resumed the practice of law in Kenosha, Wisconsin.

Randall was elected city attorney in 1921 and served until 1930, continued the practice of law in Kenosha, Wisconsin, until his death there of a heart attack on October 16, 1934. He was interred in Green Ridge Cemetery.

U.S. House of Representatives
Preceded by Henry A. Cooper	Member of the U.S. House of Representatives from Wisconsin's 1st congressional district March 4, 1919 – March 3, 1921	Succeeded by Henry A. Cooper
