= Henry Allen Cooper =

American lawyer and politician (1850–1931)

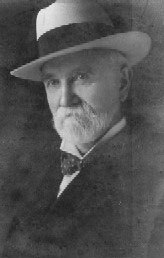

Member of the U.S. House of Representatives from Wisconsin's 1st district
- In office March 4, 1921 – March 1, 1931
- Preceded by: Clifford E. Randall
- Succeeded by: Thomas Ryum Amlie
- In office March 4, 1893 – March 3, 1919
- Preceded by: Clinton Babbitt
- Succeeded by: Clifford E. Randall

Member of the Wisconsin Senate from the 3rd district
- In office January 3, 1887 – January 5, 1891
- Preceded by: Charles Jonas
- Succeeded by: Adam Apple

District Attorney of Racine County, Wisconsin
- In office January 1, 1881 – January 1, 1887

Personal details
- Born: September 8, 1850 Spring Prairie, Wisconsin, U.S.
- Died: March 1, 1931 (aged 80) Washington D.C., U.S.
- Resting place: Mound Cemetery, Racine, Wisconsin
- Party: Republican
- Other political affiliations: Progressive
- Spouse: Sara Amelia Phillips
- Parent: Joel H. Cooper (father)
- Education: Northwestern University
- Committees: Insular Affairs, Rivers and Harbors

Henry Allen Cooper (September 8, 1850 – March 1, 1931) was an American lawyer and progressive Republican politician from Racine County, Wisconsin. He served 36 years as a member of the U.S. House of Representatives, representing Wisconsin's 1st congressional district from 1893 until his death in 1931. He earlier served in the Wisconsin Senate and was district attorney of Racine County.

His father, Joel H. Cooper, served in the Wisconsin State Assembly during the 1852 term, and was a prominent abolitionist who participated in the Underground Railroad. Cooper famously gave shelter to Joshua Glover on his journey to freedom in Canada, but was not one of the abolitionists prosecuted in the related Ableman v. Booth court cases.

== Early life ==
Cooper was born in Spring Prairie, Wisconsin, son of former Free Soil Party State Representative Joel H. Cooper, a physician. In 1851 the family moved to Burlington, Wisconsin. Their house was a station of the Underground Railroad, and in 1852 sheltered fugitive slave Joshua Cooper on his way to Canada. Henry Cooper graduated from Burlington High School in June 1869. After school, Cooper attended Northwestern University in Evanston, Illinois, and graduated in 1873. He then attended Union College of Law, then the legal faculty of Northwestern University and graduated there in 1875. He was then admitted to the bar, practiced in Chicago until 1879 and then commenced practice at Burlington.

Cooper was elected district attorney of Racine County in November 1880 and moved to Racine in January 1881. In 1882 and 1884 he was reelected as district attorney without opposition.

== Political career ==
In 1884, Cooper served as a delegate to the Republican National Convention, a tradition he would continue in 1908 and 1924. He was subsequently elected to the Wisconsin Senate in 1886 and served in the 1887 and 1889 legislative sessions. He represented Wisconsin's 3rd State Senate district, which then comprised just Racine County. During his time in the State Senate, he authored a bill to introduce the secret ballot in Wisconsin. In 1890 Cooper unsuccessfully ran for election to the fifty-second Congress.

In 1892, Cooper was elected to the fifty-third Congress, running on the Republican Party ticket in Wisconsin's 1st congressional district. He assumed on March 4, 1893. During his time as Congressman, Cooper served as the chairman of the Committee of Rivers and Harbors for the fifty-fifth Congress and the Committee on Insular Affairs for the fifty-sixth Congress through to the sixtieth Congress.

He was also the author of the Philippine Organic Act (1902), and read out the poem Mi último adiós by José Rizal as part of successfully persuading his fellow congressmen to vote for the act. Cooper provided key support for the 1910 bill authorizing construction of the Lincoln Memorial.

On April 5, 1917, he was one of 50 representatives who voted against declaring war on Germany. Partly due to his opposition to American involvement in World War I, Cooper failed to gain reelection to his seat in 1918, finishing his term on March 3, 1919. Overall serving from the Fifty-third Congress to the Sixty-fifth Congress.

After missing a term of Congress, Cooper was once again elected to represent Wisconsin's 1st district in the Sixty-seventh Congress in 1920 and to the five succeeding Congresses. He served until his death in Washington, D.C., on March 1, 1931, which came before he could start his new term (in the seventy-second Congress). He was buried in Mound Cemetery, Racine, Wisconsin.

== Electoral history ==
=== U.S. House of Representatives (1890–1930) ===
Year	Election	Date	Elected				Defeated				Total	Plurality
1890	General	Nov. 4	Clinton Babbitt	Democratic	14,532	48.13%	H. A. Cooper	Rep.	14,209	47.06%	30,191	323
1890	General	Nov. 4	Clinton Babbitt	Democratic	14,532	48.13%	Stephen Favill	Proh.	1,316	4.36%	30,191	323
1892	General	Nov. 8	Henry Allen Cooper	Republican	20,222	52.26%	Clinton Babbitt (inc)	Dem.	16,449	42.51%	38,692	3,773
1892	General	Nov. 8	Henry Allen Cooper	Republican	20,222	52.26%	T. C. Murdock	Proh.	2,021	5.22%	38,692	3,773
1894	General	Nov. 6	Henry Allen Cooper (inc)	Republican	21,972	56.70%	Andrew Kull	Dem.	12,334	31.83%	38,749	9,638
1894	General	Nov. 6	Henry Allen Cooper (inc)	Republican	21,972	56.70%	Hamilton Utley	Peo.	2,828	7.30%	38,749	9,638
1894	General	Nov. 6	Henry Allen Cooper (inc)	Republican	21,972	56.70%	Alex S. Kaye	Proh.	1,615	4.17%	38,749	9,638
1896	General	Nov. 3	Henry Allen Cooper (inc)	Republican	28,235	64.11%	Jeremiah L. Mahoney	Dem.	14,723	33.43%	44,042	13,512
1896	General	Nov. 3	Henry Allen Cooper (inc)	Republican	28,235	64.11%	George W. White	Proh.	1,084	2.46%	44,042	13,512
1898	General	Nov. 8	Henry Allen Cooper (inc)	Republican	19,887	61.51%	Clinton Babbitt	Dem.	11,447	35.41%	32,329	8,440
1898	General	Nov. 8	Henry Allen Cooper (inc)	Republican	19,887	61.51%	John C. Huffman	Proh.	995	3.08%	32,329	8,440
1900	General	Nov. 6	Henry Allen Cooper (inc)	Republican	28,256	64.09%	Gilbert T. Hodges	Dem.	14,556	33.01%	44,091	13,700
1900	General	Nov. 6	Henry Allen Cooper (inc)	Republican	28,256	64.09%	John R. Beveridge	Proh.	1,279	2.90%	44,091	13,700
1902	General	Nov. 4	Henry Allen Cooper (inc)	Republican	20,437	60.69%	Lewis C. Baker	Dem.	12,122	36.00%	33,672	8,315
1902	General	Nov. 4	Henry Allen Cooper (inc)	Republican	20,437	60.69%	Thomas W. North	Proh.	1,111	3.30%	33,672	8,315
1904	General	Nov. 8	Henry Allen Cooper (inc)	Republican	25,125	59.52%	Calvin Stewart	Dem.	13,379	31.69%	42,212	11,746
1904	General	Nov. 8	Henry Allen Cooper (inc)	Republican	25,125	59.52%	Jacob W. Born	S.D.	2,461	5.83%	42,212	11,746
1904	General	Nov. 8	Henry Allen Cooper (inc)	Republican	25,125	59.52%	Henry H. Tubbs	Proh.	1,235	2.93%	42,212	11,746
1906	General	Nov. 6	Henry Allen Cooper (inc)	Republican	16,226	61.11%	John J. Cunningham	Dem.	8,818	33.21%	26,553	7,408
1906	General	Nov. 6	Henry Allen Cooper (inc)	Republican	16,226	61.11%	Moses Hull	S.D.	1,504	5.66%	26,553	7,408
1908	General	Nov. 3	Henry Allen Cooper (inc)	Republican	26,728	60.58%	Henry A. Moehlenpah	Dem.	14,018	31.77%	44,117	12,710
1908	General	Nov. 3	Henry Allen Cooper (inc)	Republican	26,728	60.58%	William A. Jacobs	S.D.	1,791	4.06%	44,117	12,710
1908	General	Nov. 3	Henry Allen Cooper (inc)	Republican	26,728	60.58%	J. H. Berkey	Proh.	1,576	3.57%	44,117	12,710
1910	General	Nov. 8	Henry Allen Cooper (inc)	Republican	15,096	57.22%	Calvin Stewart	Dem.	8,606	32.62%	26,384	6,490
1910	General	Nov. 8	Henry Allen Cooper (inc)	Republican	15,096	57.22%	Michael Yabs	S.D.	1,860	7.05%	26,384	6,490
1910	General	Nov. 8	Henry Allen Cooper (inc)	Republican	15,096	57.22%	Hans H. Moe	Proh.	820	3.11%	26,384	6,490
1912	General	Nov. 5	Henry Allen Cooper (inc)	Republican	18,914	53.15%	Calvin Stewart	Dem.	13,816	38.82%	35,586	5,098
1912	General	Nov. 5	Henry Allen Cooper (inc)	Republican	18,914	53.15%	Joseph Orth	S.D.	1,523	4.28%	35,586	5,098
1912	General	Nov. 5	Henry Allen Cooper (inc)	Republican	18,914	53.15%	Marcus S. Kellogg	Proh.	1,333	3.75%	35,586	5,098
1914	General	Nov. 3	Henry Allen Cooper (inc)	Republican	16,547	58.18%	Calvin Stewart	Dem.	9,911	34.85%	28,439	6,636
1914	General	Nov. 3	Henry Allen Cooper (inc)	Republican	16,547	58.18%	John P. Fennell	S.D.	1,077	3.79%	28,439	6,636
1914	General	Nov. 3	Henry Allen Cooper (inc)	Republican	16,547	58.18%	Truman Parker	Proh.	902	3.17%	28,439	6,636
1916	General	Nov. 7	Henry Allen Cooper (inc)	Republican	24,851	61.56%	Jay W. Page	Dem.	12,587	31.18%	40,367	12,264
1916	General	Nov. 7	Henry Allen Cooper (inc)	Republican	24,851	61.56%	William J. Hensche	Proh.	1,491	3.69%	40,367	12,264
1916	General	Nov. 7	Henry Allen Cooper (inc)	Republican	24,851	61.56%	Michael Yabs	S.D.	1,434	3.55%	40,367	12,264
1918	Primary	Sep. 3	Clifford E. Randall	Republican	8,295	50.51%	Henry Allen Cooper (inc)	Rep.	8,113	49.41%	16,421	182
1918	General	Nov. 5	Clifford E. Randall	Republican	13,177	42.28%	Henry Allen Cooper (inc)	Ind.	7,718	24.77%	31,164	4,159
1918	General	Nov. 5	Clifford E. Randall	Republican	13,177	42.28%	Calvin Stewart	Dem.	9,018	28.94%	31,164	4,159
1918	General	Nov. 5	Clifford E. Randall	Republican	13,177	42.28%	Michael Yabs	S.D.	1,242	3.99%	31,164	4,159
1920	Primary	Sep. 7	Henry Allen Cooper	Republican	15,282	37.63%	Clifford E. Randall (inc)	Rep.	13,896	34.21%	40,614	1,386
1920	Primary	Sep. 7	Henry Allen Cooper	Republican	15,282	37.63%	Charles D. Rosa	Rep.	7,437	18.31%	40,614	1,386
1920	Primary	Sep. 7	Henry Allen Cooper	Republican	15,282	37.63%	F. C. Adams	Rep.	3,999	9.85%	40,614	1,386
1920	General	Nov. 2	Henry Allen Cooper	Republican	51,144	75.88%	Andrew F. Stahl	Dem.	13,661	20.27%	67,400	37,483
1920	General	Nov. 2	Henry Allen Cooper	Republican	51,144	75.88%	Samuel S. Walkup	Soc.	2,585	3.84%	67,400	37,483
1922	Primary	Sep. 5	Henry Allen Cooper (inc)	Republican	27,633	68.59%	Lawrence C. Whittet	Rep.	12,656	31.41%	40,289	14,977
1922	General	Nov. 7	Henry Allen Cooper (inc)	Republican	37,958	94.44%	Niels P. Nielson	Soc.	2,179	5.42%	40,191	35,779
1924	Primary	Sep. 2	Henry Allen Cooper (inc)	Republican	36,513	62.68%	Charles H. Pfennig	Rep.	21,738	37.32%	58,251	14,775
1924	General	Nov. 4	Henry Allen Cooper (inc)	Republican	60,770	71.97%	Calvin Stewart	Dem.	23,612	27.97%	84,433	37,158
1926	General	Nov. 2	Henry Allen Cooper (inc)	Republican	50,531	99.95%	--unopposed--				50,555	50,507
1928	Primary	Sep. 4	Henry Allen Cooper (inc)	Republican	41,914	82.68%	Richard A. Williams	Rep.	8,780	17.32%	50,694	33,134
1928	General	Nov. 6	Henry Allen Cooper (inc)	Republican	83,064	80.17%	William C. Kiernan	Dem.	20,539	19.82%	103,612	62,525
1930	General	Nov. 4	Henry Allen Cooper (inc)	Republican	46,272	95.65%	William C. Kiernan	Dem.	2,102	4.35%	48,374	44,170

== See also ==
- List of members of the United States Congress who died in office (1900–1949)
- List of Speaker of the United States House of Representatives elections § December 1923

Wisconsin Senate
Preceded by Charles Jonas	Member of the Wisconsin Senate from the 3rd district January 3, 1887 – January 5, 1891	Succeeded by Adam Apple
U.S. House of Representatives
Preceded by Clinton Babbitt	Member of the U.S. House of Representatives from Wisconsin's 1st congressional district March 4, 1893 – March 3, 1919	Succeeded by Clifford Ellsworth Randall
Preceded by Clifford Ellsworth Randall	Member of the U.S. House of Representatives from Wisconsin's 1st congressional district March 4, 1921 – March 1, 1931	Succeeded by Thomas Ryum Amlie
