= Elmer A. Morse =

American politician (1870–1945)

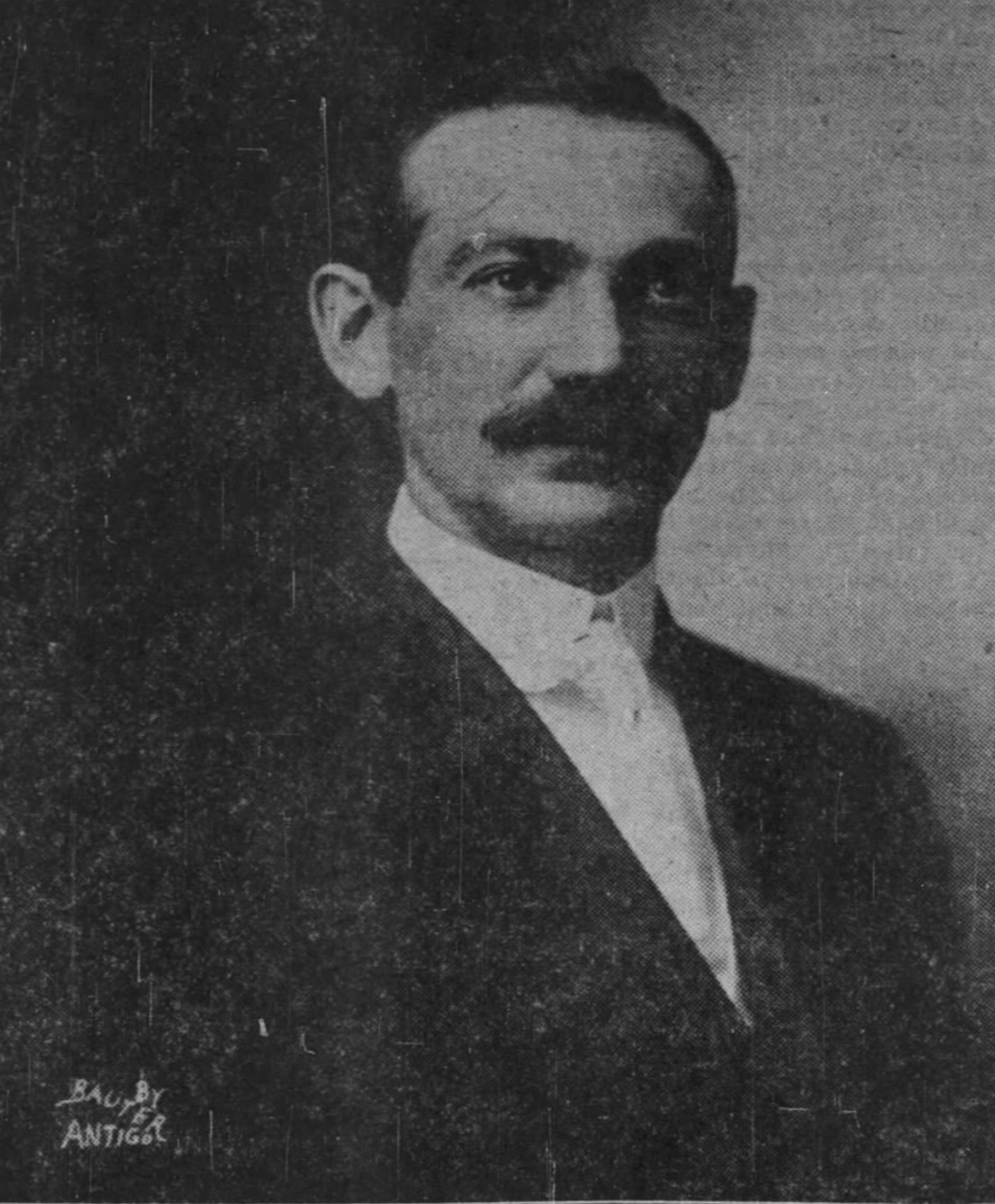
- The Marshfield News (Marshfield, WI), November 5, 1908

Member of the U.S. House of Representatives from Wisconsin's 10th district
- In office March 4, 1907 – March 3, 1913
- Preceded by: Webster E. Brown
- Succeeded by: James A. Frear

Personal details
- Born: May 11, 1870 Franksville, Wisconsin, U.S.
- Died: October 4, 1945 (aged 75) Rochester, Minnesota, U.S.
- Party: Republican

Elmer Addison Morse (May 11, 1870 – October 4, 1945) was a U.S. Representative from Wisconsin.

Born in Franksville, Wisconsin, Morse attended the common schools of Racine County. He graduated from Ripon College, Wisconsin, in 1893.

Morse was elected county superintendent of schools of Racine County in 1893 and reelected in 1895. He attended the law school of the University of Wisconsin–Madison. He was admitted to the bar in 1900 and commenced practice in Antigo, Wisconsin; Morse was also city attorney of Antigo from 1900 to 1906. He also engaged in the insurance and real estate business from 1900 until his death.

Morse was elected as a Republican to the Sixtieth, Sixty-first, and Sixty-second Congresses (March 4, 1907 – March 3, 1913). He represented Wisconsin's 10th congressional district. He was an unsuccessful candidate for reelection in 1912 to the Sixty-third Congress. He resumed the practice of law in Antigo, Wisconsin. He served as delegate to the Republican State conventions in 1934 and 1940. He died in Rochester, Minnesota, on October 4, 1945. He was interred in Elmwood Cemetery, Antigo, Wisconsin.

U.S. House of Representatives
Preceded by Webster E. Brown	Member of the U.S. House of Representatives from Wisconsin's 10th congressional district March 4, 1907 - March 3, 1913	Succeeded by James A. Frear
