= 1848 United States House of Representatives elections in Wisconsin =

- May 8, 1848; November 7, 1848

All 3 Wisconsin seats to the United States House of Representatives
	Majority party	Minority party	Third party
Party	Democratic	Whig	Free Soil
Seats before	2	0	0
Seats won	1	1	1
Seat change	▼1	▲1	▲1
Popular vote	15,872	15,234	9,284
Percentage	39.30%	37.72%	22.99%
Swing	▼17.27%	▼3.50%	New

The 1848 United States House of Representatives elections in Wisconsin were held on May 8, 1848 to elect the first U.S. representatives from the newly admitted state of Wisconsin. These representatives were elected to terms that would last the remainder of the 30th Congress. Members were elected to full terms on November 7, 1848, which would begin on the upcoming 31st Congress.

Upon statehood, Wisconsin was originally delegated two districts which were both held by Democratic representatives. The state gained a third seat in the general election, leading to the opposing Whig and Free Soil parties gaining seats.

== Short term elections ==
Original congressional districts in Wisconsin used in the May 1848 elections District 1 District 2

=== District 1 ===
May 1848 Wisconsin's 1st congressional district election
Party	Candidate	Votes	%
Democratic	William Pitt Lynde	9,834	54.89
Whig	Edward V. Whiton	7,387	41.23
Liberty	Ichabod Codding	696	3.89
Total votes		17,917	100.00
Democratic win (new seat)			

=== District 2 ===
May 1848 Wisconsin's 2nd congressional district election
Party	Candidate	Votes	%
Democratic	Mason C. Darling	9,683	58.38
Whig	Alexander L. Collins	6,835	41.21
Write-in		68	0.41
Total votes		16,586	100.00
Democratic win (new seat)			

== Full term elections ==
Congressional districts in Wisconsin used in the November 1848 elections, following the addition of the third district District 1 District 2 District 3

=== District 1 ===
November 1848 Wisconsin's 1st congressional district election
Party	Candidate	Votes	%
Free Soil	Charles Durkee	5,038	38.49
Democratic	William Pitt Lynde (incumbent)	4,436	33.89
Whig	Asahel Finch Jr.	3,615	27.62
Total votes		13,089	100.00
Free Soil gain from Democratic			

=== District 2 ===
November 1848 Wisconsin's 2nd congressional district election
Party	Candidate	Votes	%
Whig	Orsamus Cole	6,281	45.23
Democratic	A. Hyatt Smith	5,690	40.97
Free Soil	George W. Crabb	1,916	13.80
Total votes		13,887	100.00
Whig gain from Democratic			

=== District 3 ===
November 1848 Wisconsin's 3rd congressional district election
Party	Candidate	Votes	%
Democratic	James Duane Doty	5,746	50.34
Whig	Timothy O. Howe	3,338	29.25
Free Soil	Stoddard Judd	2,330	20.41
Total votes		11,414	100.00
Democratic win (new seat)			

== See also ==
- 1848 United States Senate elections in Wisconsin
