= Gustav Küstermann =

American politician (1850–1919)

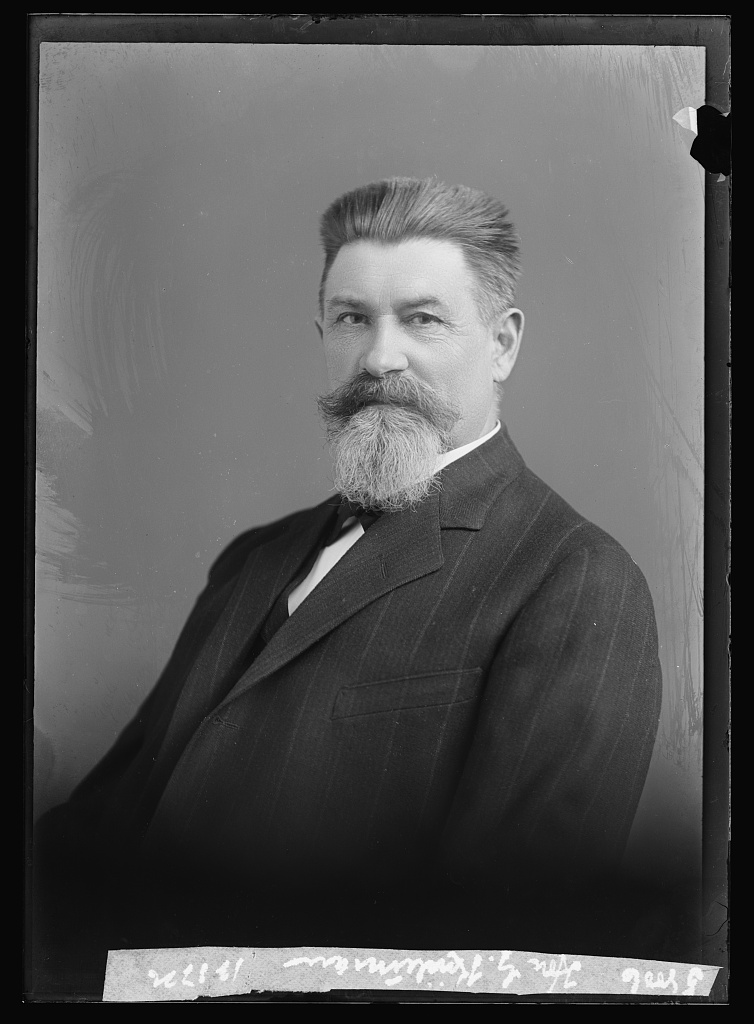

Member of the U.S. House of Representatives from Wisconsin's 9th district
- In office March 4, 1907 – March 3, 1911
- Preceded by: Edward S. Minor
- Succeeded by: Thomas F. Konop

Personal details
- Born: May 24, 1850 Detmold, Lippe-Detmold
- Died: December 25, 1919 (aged 69) Green Bay, Wisconsin, U.S.
- Party: Republican

Gustav Küstermann (May 24, 1850 – December 25, 1919) was a U.S. Representative from Wisconsin.

== Biography ==
Born in Detmold, Lippe-Detmold, Küstermann graduated from high school and worked at a store in Hamburg, Germany, before immigrating to the United States when he was 18.

Kustermann worked at a St. Louis, Missouri, hardware store for several months before moving to Green Bay, Wisconsin. He worked as the bookkeeper for the Green Bay Advocate newspaper, and later owned and operated his own store dealing in musical instruments, stationery and other items. He served on the board of directors of the Citizens National Bank, and was an officer of the Green Bay Businessmen's Association.

A Republican, Kustermann served on the Green Bay City Council and as the City Treasurer. He later served on the Brown County Board of Supervisors, and was a member and president of the state Board of Control. He was twice an unsuccessful candidate for Congress, and served as postmaster of Green Bay during the administration of Benjamin Harrison.

Küstermann was elected to the Sixtieth and Sixty-first United States Congresses (March 4, 1907 - March 3, 1911). He represented Wisconsin's 9th congressional district. He was defeated for reelection to the Sixty-second Congress.

He died in Green Bay on December 25, 1919, and is buried in Allouez, Wisconsin's Woodlawn Cemetery.

U.S. House of Representatives
Preceded by Edward S. Minor	Member of the U.S. House of Representatives from Wisconsin's 9th congressional district March 4, 1907 - March 3, 1911	Succeeded by Thomas F. Konop
