= Wisconsin's 2nd congressional district =

U.S. House district for Wisconsin

Coordinates: 42°59′05″N 89°45′04″W

- Interactive map of district boundaries since January 3, 2023
- Representative: Mark Pocan; D–Vermont
- Area: 4,368.27 mi^{2} (11,313.8 km^{2})
- Distribution: 75.46% urban; 24.54% rural
- Population (2025): 766,719
- Median household income: $89,824
- Ethnicity: 77.75% White; 9.61% Two or more races; 7.91% Hispanic; 5.49% Asian; 3.79% Black; 2.93% other; 0.41% Native American; 0.02% Pacific Islander Americans
- Cook PVI: D+21
- Created: 1848

Wisconsin's 2nd congressional district is a congressional district of the United States House of Representatives in southern Wisconsin, covering Dane County, Iowa County, Lafayette County, Sauk County and Green County, as well as portions of Richland County and Rock County. Democrat Mark Pocan has represented the district since 2013.

The district includes Madison, the state's capital, and its metropolitan area. The district also includes the University of Wisconsin–Madison campus, and like many districts of this era anchored by a college town, the district is overwhelmingly Democratic. Since redistricting in 2002, only the Milwaukee-based 4th district is more Democratic-leaning.

Democratic nominee John Kerry won the district in 2004 with 62% of the vote. Democrat Barack Obama also swept the district in 2008 with 69% of the vote to Republican John McCain's 30%. Republican Donald Trump received the lowest percentage vote of a major party presidential candidate in the district in the 21st century, with 29% in both 2016 and 2020, to Democrats Hillary Clinton and Joe Biden's 66% and 69%, respectively.

== Counties and municipalities within the district ==
For the 118th and successive Congresses (based on redistricting following the 2020 census), the district contains all or portions of the following counties, towns, and municipalities:

Dane County (60)

All 60 towns and municipalities

Green County (24)

All 24 towns and municipalities

Iowa County (29)

All 29 towns and municipalities

Lafayette County (28)

All 28 towns and municipalities

Rock County (18)

Avon, Beloit (city) (part; also 1st), Beloit (town) (part; also 1st), Center, Edgerton (shared with Dane County), Evansville, Footville, Fulton, Janesville (city) (part; also 1st), Janesville (town) (part; also 1st), Magnolia, Newark, Orfordville, Porter, Plymouth, Rock (part; also 1st), Spring Valley, Union

Sauk County (34)

Baraboo (city), Baraboo (town), Bear Creek, Dellona, Delton, Excelsior, Fairfield, Franklin, Freedom, Greenfield, Honey Creek, Ironton (town) (part; also 3rd), Lake Delton, Loganville, Merrimac (town), Merrimac (village), North Freedom, Plain, Prairie du Sac (town), Prairie du Sac (village), Reedsburg (city), Reedsburg (town), Rock Springs, Spring Green, Sauk City, Spring Green (town), Spring Green (village), Sumpter, Troy, Washington, West Baraboo, Westfield, Winfield, Wisconsin Dells (part; also 3rd and 6th; shared with Adams, Columbia, and Juneau counties)

== List of members representing the district ==
Member	Party	Date	Cong ress	Electoral history	District
District established June 9, 1848
Mason C. Darling (Fond du Lac)	Democratic	June 9, 1848 – March 3, 1849	30th	Elected to the short term in 1848. Retired.	Brown, Calumet, Chippewa, Columbia, Crawford, Dane, Dodge, Fond du Lac, Grant, Iowa, La Pointe, Lafayette, Manitowoc, Marquette, Portage, Richland, Sauk, Sheboygan, St. Croix, Washington, & Winnebago counties
Orsamus Cole (Potosi)	Whig	March 4, 1849 – March 3, 1851	31st	Elected to the regular term in 1848. Lost re-election.	Adams, Chippewa, Crawford, Dane, Grant, Green, Iowa, La Pointe, Lafayette, Portage, Richland, Rock, Sauk, & St. Croix, counties (& Bad Ax, Buffalo, Burnett, Douglas, Dunn, Eau Claire, Jackson, Juneau, La Crosse, Marathon, Monroe, Pepin, Pierce, Polk, Trempealeau, & Wood counties created from this territory during the 1850s)
Ben C. Eastman (Platteville)	Democratic	March 4, 1851 – March 3, 1855	32nd 33rd	Elected in 1850. Re-elected in 1852. Retired.	Adams, Chippewa, Crawford, Dane, Grant, Green, Iowa, La Pointe, Lafayette, Portage, Richland, Rock, Sauk, & St. Croix, counties (& Bad Ax, Buffalo, Burnett, Douglas, Dunn, Eau Claire, Jackson, Juneau, La Crosse, Marathon, Monroe, Pepin, Pierce, Polk, Trempealeau, & Wood counties created from this territory during the 1850s)
Cadwallader C. Washburn (La Crosse)	Republican	March 4, 1855 – March 3, 1861	34th 35th 36th	Elected in 1854. Re-elected in 1856. Re-elected in 1858. Retired.	Adams, Chippewa, Crawford, Dane, Grant, Green, Iowa, La Pointe, Lafayette, Portage, Richland, Rock, Sauk, & St. Croix, counties (& Bad Ax, Buffalo, Burnett, Douglas, Dunn, Eau Claire, Jackson, Juneau, La Crosse, Marathon, Monroe, Pepin, Pierce, Polk, Trempealeau, & Wood counties created from this territory during the 1850s)
Luther Hanchett (Plover)	Republican	March 4, 1861 – November 24, 1862	37th	Elected in 1860. Died.	Adams, Chippewa, Crawford, Dane, Grant, Green, Iowa, La Pointe, Lafayette, Portage, Richland, Rock, Sauk, & St. Croix, counties (& Bad Ax, Buffalo, Burnett, Douglas, Dunn, Eau Claire, Jackson, Juneau, La Crosse, Marathon, Monroe, Pepin, Pierce, Polk, Trempealeau, & Wood counties created from this territory during the 1850s)
Vacant		November 24, 1862 – January 26, 1863	37th		Adams, Chippewa, Crawford, Dane, Grant, Green, Iowa, La Pointe, Lafayette, Portage, Richland, Rock, Sauk, & St. Croix, counties (& Bad Ax, Buffalo, Burnett, Douglas, Dunn, Eau Claire, Jackson, Juneau, La Crosse, Marathon, Monroe, Pepin, Pierce, Polk, Trempealeau, & Wood counties created from this territory during the 1850s)
Walter D. McIndoe (Wausau)	Republican	January 26, 1863 – March 3, 1863	37th	Elected to finish Hanchett's term. Redistricted to the 6th district.	Adams, Chippewa, Crawford, Dane, Grant, Green, Iowa, La Pointe, Lafayette, Portage, Richland, Rock, Sauk, & St. Croix, counties (& Bad Ax, Buffalo, Burnett, Douglas, Dunn, Eau Claire, Jackson, Juneau, La Crosse, Marathon, Monroe, Pepin, Pierce, Polk, Trempealeau, & Wood counties created from this territory during the 1850s)
Ithamar Sloan (Janesville)	Republican	March 4, 1863 – March 3, 1867	38th 39th	Elected in 1862. Re-elected in 1864. Retired.	Columbia, Dane, Jefferson, & Rock counties
Benjamin F. Hopkins (Madison)	Republican	March 4, 1867 – January 1, 1870	40th 41st	Elected in 1866. Re-elected in 1868. Died.	Columbia, Dane, Jefferson, & Rock counties
Vacant		January 1, 1870 – February 23, 1870	41st		Columbia, Dane, Jefferson, & Rock counties
David Atwood (Madison)	Republican	February 23, 1870 – March 3, 1871	41st	Elected to finish Hopkins's term. Retired.	Columbia, Dane, Jefferson, & Rock counties
Gerry Whiting Hazelton (Columbus)	Republican	March 4, 1871 – March 3, 1875	42nd 43rd	Elected in 1870. Re-elected in 1872. Retired.	Columbia, Dane, Jefferson, & Rock counties
Gerry Whiting Hazelton (Columbus)	Republican	March 4, 1871 – March 3, 1875	42nd 43rd	Elected in 1870. Re-elected in 1872. Retired.	Columbia, Dane, Jefferson, & Sauk counties
Lucien B. Caswell (Fort Atkinson)	Republican	March 4, 1875 – March 3, 1883	44th 45th 46th 47th	Elected in 1874. Re-elected in 1876. Re-elected in 1878. Re-elected in 1880. Lost renomination.	Columbia, Dane, Jefferson, & Sauk counties
Daniel H. Sumner (Waukesha)	Democratic	March 4, 1883 – March 3, 1885	48th	Elected in 1882. Retired.	Dodge, Fond du Lac, Washington, & Waukesha counties
Edward S. Bragg (Fond du Lac)	Democratic	March 4, 1885 – March 3, 1887	49th	Elected in 1884. Lost renomination.	Dodge, Fond du Lac, Washington, & Waukesha counties
Richard W. Guenther (Oshkosh)	Republican	March 4, 1887 – March 3, 1889	50th	Redistricted from the 6th district and re-elected in 1886. Retired.	Dodge, Fond du Lac, Washington, & Waukesha counties
Charles Barwig (Mayville)	Democratic	March 4, 1889 – March 3, 1895	51st 52nd 53rd	Elected in 1888. Re-elected in 1890. Re-elected in 1892. Lost re-election.	Dodge, Fond du Lac, Washington, & Waukesha counties
Charles Barwig (Mayville)	Democratic	March 4, 1889 – March 3, 1895	51st 52nd 53rd	Elected in 1888. Re-elected in 1890. Re-elected in 1892. Lost re-election.	Columbia, Dane, Dodge, & Jefferson counties
Edward Sauerhering (Mayville)	Republican	March 4, 1895 – March 3, 1899	54th 55th	Elected in 1894. Re-elected in 1896. Retired.	Columbia, Dane, Dodge, & Jefferson counties
Herman Dahle (Mount Horeb)	Republican	March 4, 1899 – March 3, 1903	56th 57th	Elected in 1898. Re-elected in 1900. Lost renomination.	Columbia, Dane, Dodge, & Jefferson counties
Henry Cullen Adams (Madison)	Republican	March 4, 1903 – July 9, 1906	58th 59th	Elected in 1902. Re-elected in 1904. Died.	Adams, Columbia, Dane, Jefferson, Green Lake, & Marquette counties
Vacant		July 9, 1906 – September 4, 1906	59th		Adams, Columbia, Dane, Jefferson, Green Lake, & Marquette counties
John M. Nelson (Madison)	Republican	September 4, 1906 – March 3, 1913	59th 60th 61st 62nd	Elected to finish Adams's term. Re-elected in 1906. Re-elected in 1908. Re-elected in 1910. Redistricted to the 3rd district.	Adams, Columbia, Dane, Jefferson, Green Lake, & Marquette counties
Michael E. Burke (Beaver Dam)	Democratic	March 4, 1913 – March 3, 1917	63rd 64th	Redistricted from the 6th district and re-elected in 1912. Re-elected in 1914. Lost re-election.	Columbia, Dodge, Jefferson, Ozaukee, Sheboygan, & Washington counties
Edward Voigt (Sheboygan)	Republican	March 4, 1917 – March 3, 1927	65th 66th 67th 68th 69th	Elected in 1916. Re-elected in 1918. Re-elected in 1920. Re-elected in 1922. Re-elected in 1924. Retired.	Columbia, Dodge, Jefferson, Ozaukee, Sheboygan, & Washington counties
Charles A. Kading (Watertown)	Republican	March 4, 1927 – March 3, 1933	70th 71st 72nd	Elected in 1926. Re-elected in 1928. Re-elected in 1930. Lost renomination.	Columbia, Dodge, Jefferson, Ozaukee, Sheboygan, & Washington counties
Charles W. Henney (Portage)	Democratic	March 4, 1933 – January 3, 1935	73rd	Elected in 1932. Lost re-election.	Columbia, Dane, Dodge, Jefferson, & Waukesha counties
Harry Sauthoff (Madison)	Progressive	January 3, 1935 – January 3, 1939	74th 75th	Elected in 1934. Re-elected in 1936. Lost re-election.	Columbia, Dane, Dodge, Jefferson, & Waukesha counties
Charles Hawks Jr. (Horicon)	Republican	January 3, 1939 – January 3, 1941	76th	Elected in 1938. Lost re-election.	Columbia, Dane, Dodge, Jefferson, & Waukesha counties
Harry Sauthoff (Madison)	Progressive	January 3, 1941 – January 3, 1945	77th 78th	Elected in 1940. Re-elected in 1942. Lost re-election.	Columbia, Dane, Dodge, Jefferson, & Waukesha counties
Robert Kirkland Henry (Jefferson)	Republican	January 3, 1945 – November 20, 1946	79th	Elected in 1944. Re-elected in 1946 but died before next term began.	Columbia, Dane, Dodge, Jefferson, & Waukesha counties
Vacant		November 20, 1946 – April 22, 1947	79th 80th		Columbia, Dane, Dodge, Jefferson, & Waukesha counties
Glenn Robert Davis (Waukesha)	Republican	April 22, 1947 – January 3, 1957	80th 81st 82nd 83rd 84th	Elected to finish Henry's term. Re-elected in 1948. Re-elected in 1950. Re-elected in 1952. Re-elected in 1954. Retired to run for U.S. senator.	Columbia, Dane, Dodge, Jefferson, & Waukesha counties
Donald Edgar Tewes (Waukesha)	Republican	January 3, 1957 – January 3, 1959	85th	Elected in 1956. Lost re-election.	Columbia, Dane, Dodge, Jefferson, & Waukesha counties
Robert Kastenmeier (Sun Prairie)	Democratic	January 3, 1959 – January 3, 1991	86th 87th 88th 89th 90th 91st 92nd 93rd 94th 95th 96th 97th 98th 99th 100th 101st	Elected in 1958. Re-elected in 1960. Re-elected in 1962. Re-elected in 1964. Re-elected in 1966. Re-elected in 1968. Re-elected in 1970. Re-elected in 1972. Re-elected in 1974. Re-elected in 1976. Re-elected in 1978. Re-elected in 1980. Re-elected in 1982. Re-elected in 1984. Re-elected in 1986. Re-elected in 1988. Lost re-election.	Columbia, Dane, Dodge, Jefferson, & Waukesha counties
Robert Kastenmeier (Sun Prairie)	Democratic	January 3, 1959 – January 3, 1991	86th 87th 88th 89th 90th 91st 92nd 93rd 94th 95th 96th 97th 98th 99th 100th 101st	Elected in 1958. Re-elected in 1960. Re-elected in 1962. Re-elected in 1964. Re-elected in 1966. Re-elected in 1968. Re-elected in 1970. Re-elected in 1972. Re-elected in 1974. Re-elected in 1976. Re-elected in 1978. Re-elected in 1980. Re-elected in 1982. Re-elected in 1984. Re-elected in 1986. Re-elected in 1988. Lost re-election.	Columbia, Dane, Dodge, Green, & Jefferson counties
Robert Kastenmeier (Sun Prairie)	Democratic	January 3, 1959 – January 3, 1991	86th 87th 88th 89th 90th 91st 92nd 93rd 94th 95th 96th 97th 98th 99th 100th 101st	Elected in 1958. Re-elected in 1960. Re-elected in 1962. Re-elected in 1964. Re-elected in 1966. Re-elected in 1968. Re-elected in 1970. Re-elected in 1972. Re-elected in 1974. Re-elected in 1976. Re-elected in 1978. Re-elected in 1980. Re-elected in 1982. Re-elected in 1984. Re-elected in 1986. Re-elected in 1988. Lost re-election.	Columbia, Dane, Iowa, Lafayette, & Sauk counties & most of Dodge County, most of Green County, & part of Fond du Lac County: Dodge County; Town of Beaver Dam; Town of Burnett; Town of Calamus; Town of Chester; Town of Clyman; Town of Elba; Town of Fox Lake; Town of Herman; Town of Hubbard; Town of Hustisford; Town of Leroy; Town of Lomira; Town of Lowell; Town of Oak Grove; Town of Portland; Town of Shields; Town of Theresa; Town of Trenton; Town of Westford; Town of Williamstown; Village of Brownsville; Village of Clyman; Village of Hustisford; Village of Iron Ridge; Village of Kekoskee; Village of Lomira; Village of Lowell; Village of Reeseville; Village of Theresa; the part of the village of Randolph in the county; City of Beaver Dam; City of Fox Lake; City of Horicon; City of Juneau; City of Mayville; City of Waupun; Fond du Lac County; Town of Waupun; City of Waupun; All of Green County except; Town of Albany; Town of Spring Grove; Village of Albany; City of Brodhead
Robert Kastenmeier (Sun Prairie)	Democratic	January 3, 1959 – January 3, 1991	86th 87th 88th 89th 90th 91st 92nd 93rd 94th 95th 96th 97th 98th 99th 100th 101st	Elected in 1958. Re-elected in 1960. Re-elected in 1962. Re-elected in 1964. Re-elected in 1966. Re-elected in 1968. Re-elected in 1970. Re-elected in 1972. Re-elected in 1974. Re-elected in 1976. Re-elected in 1978. Re-elected in 1980. Re-elected in 1982. Re-elected in 1984. Re-elected in 1986. Re-elected in 1988. Lost re-election.	Columbia, Dane, Iowa, Lafayette, & Sauk counties & western Dodge County, northwest Green County, eastern Richland County, parts of Adams County, parts of Juneau County, & parts of Grant County: Adams County; Town of Dell Prairie; Town of New Haven; Town of Springville; Dodge County; Town of Beaver Dam; Town of Calamus; Town of Clyman; Town of Elba; Town of Emmet; Town of Fox Lake; Town of Hustisford; Town of Lowell; Town of Oak Grove; Town of Portland; Town of Shields; Town of Trenton; Town of Westford; Village of Clyman; Village of Hustisford; Village of Lowell; Village of Reeseville; the part of the village of Randolph in the county; City of Beaver Dam; City of Fox Lake; City of Horicon; City of Juneau; Grant County; Town of Hazel Green; Town of Smelser; the part of the village of Hazel Green in the county; the part of the village of Livingston in the county; the part of the village of Montfort in the county; the part of the city of Cuba City in the county; Green County; Town of Adams; Town of Jordan; Town of Monroe; Town of New Glarus; Town of Sylvester; Town of Washington; Town of York; Village of New Glarus; the part of the village of Belleville in the county; the part of the village of Brooklyn in the county; City of Monroe; Juneau County; Town of Kildare; Town of Lyndon; Town of Seven Mile Creek; Town of Summit; Town of Wonewoc; Village of Lyndon Station; Village of Union Center; Village of Wonewoc; the part of the city of Wisconsin Dells in the county; Richland County; Town of Buena Vista; Town of Ithaca; Town of Orion; Town of Westford; Town of Willow; Village of Lone Rock; the part of the village of Cazenovia in the county
Scott Klug (Madison)	Republican	January 3, 1991 – January 3, 1999	102nd 103rd 104th 105th	Elected in 1990. Re-elected in 1992. Re-elected in 1994. Re-elected in 1996. Retired.	
Scott Klug (Madison)	Republican	January 3, 1991 – January 3, 1999	102nd 103rd 104th 105th	Elected in 1990. Re-elected in 1992. Re-elected in 1994. Re-elected in 1996. Retired.	1993–2003
Tammy Baldwin (Madison)	Democratic	January 3, 1999 – January 3, 2013	106th 107th 108th 109th 110th 111th 112th	Elected in 1998. Re-elected in 2000. Re-elected in 2002. Re-elected in 2004. Re-elected in 2006. Re-elected in 2008. Re-elected in 2010. Retired to run for U.S. senator.	1993–2003
Tammy Baldwin (Madison)	Democratic	January 3, 1999 – January 3, 2013	106th 107th 108th 109th 110th 111th 112th	Elected in 1998. Re-elected in 2000. Re-elected in 2002. Re-elected in 2004. Re-elected in 2006. Re-elected in 2008. Re-elected in 2010. Retired to run for U.S. senator.	2003–2013
Mark Pocan (Vermont)	Democratic	January 3, 2013 – present	113th 114th 115th 116th 117th 118th 119th	Elected in 2012. Re-elected in 2014. Re-elected in 2016. Re-elected in 2018. Re-elected in 2020. Re-elected in 2022. Re-elected in 2024. Re-elected in 2026.	2013–2023
Mark Pocan (Vermont)	Democratic	January 3, 2013 – present	113th 114th 115th 116th 117th 118th 119th	Elected in 2012. Re-elected in 2014. Re-elected in 2016. Re-elected in 2018. Re-elected in 2020. Re-elected in 2022. Re-elected in 2024. Re-elected in 2026.	2023–present

== Recent election results ==
=== 2002 district boundaries (2002–2011) ===
Year	Date	Elected				Defeated				Total	Plurality
2002	Nov. 5	Tammy Baldwin (inc)	Democratic	163,313	66.01%	Ron Greer	Rep.	83,694	33.83%	247,410	79,619
2004	Nov. 2	Tammy Baldwin (inc)	Democratic	251,637	63.27%	Dave Magnum	Rep.	145,810	36.66%	397,724	105,827
2006	Nov. 7	Tammy Baldwin (inc)	Democratic	191,414	62.82%	Dave Magnum	Rep.	113,015	37.09%	304,688	78,399
2008	Nov. 4	Tammy Baldwin (inc)	Democratic	277,914	69.33%	Peter Theron	Rep.	122,513	30.56%	400,841	155,401
2010	Nov. 2	Tammy Baldwin (inc)	Democratic	191,164	61.77%	Chad Lee	Rep.	118,099	38.16%	309,460	73,065

=== 2011 district boundaries (2012–2021) ===
Year	Date	Elected				Defeated				Total	Plurality
2012	Nov. 6	Mark Pocan	Democratic	265,422	67.90%	Chad Lee	Rep.	124,683	31.90%	390,898	140,739
2012	Nov. 6	Mark Pocan	Democratic	265,422	67.90%	Joe Kopsick (write-in)	Ind.	6	0.00%	390,898	140,739
2014	Nov. 4	Mark Pocan (inc)	Democratic	224,920	68.40%	Peter Theron	Rep.	103,619	31.51%	328,847	121,301
2016	Nov. 8	Mark Pocan (inc)	Democratic	273,537	68.72%	Peter Theron	Rep.	124,044	31.16%	398,060	149,493
2018	Nov. 6	Mark Pocan (inc)	Democratic	309,116	97.42%	Joey Wayne Reed (write-in)	Rep.	29	0.01%	317,295	300,975
2018	Nov. 6	Mark Pocan (inc)	Democratic	309,116	97.42%	Rick Cruz (write-in)	Ind.	8	0.00%	317,295	300,975
2018	Nov. 6	Mark Pocan (inc)	Democratic	309,116	97.42%	Bradley Jason Burt (write-in)	Dem.	1	0.00%	317,295	300,975
2020	Nov. 3	Mark Pocan (inc)	Democratic	318,523	69.67%	Peter Theron	Rep.	138,306	30.25%	457,205	180,217

=== 2022 district boundaries (2022–2031) ===
Year	Date	Elected				Defeated				Total	Plurality
2022	Nov. 8	Mark Pocan (inc)	Democratic	268,740	70.99%	Erik Olsen	Rep.	101,890	26.92%	378,537	166,850
2022	Nov. 8	Mark Pocan (inc)	Democratic	268,740	70.99%	Douglas Alexander	Ind.	7,689	2.03%	378,537	166,850
2024	Nov. 5	Mark Pocan(inc.)	Democratic	320,317	70.1	Erik Olsen	Rep.	136,357	29.8	320,317	

== Recent election results from statewide races ==
Year	Office	Results
2008	President	Obama 70% - 28%
2010	Senate	Feingold 66% - 33%
2010	Governor	Barrett 64% - 35%
2010	Secretary of State	La Follette 67% - 33%
2010	Attorney General	Hassett 57% - 43%
2010	Treasurer	Marie Sass 61% - 39%
2012	President	Obama 69% - 31%
2012	Senate	Baldwin 66% - 32%
2012	Governor (Recall)	Barrett 65% - 35%
2014	Governor	Burke 66% - 33%
2014	Secretary of State	La Follette 67% - 29%
2014	Attorney General	Happ 64% - 33%
2014	Treasurer	Sartori 60% - 31%
2016	President	Clinton 66% - 28%
2016	Senate	Feingold 68% - 30%
2018	Senate	Baldwin 74% - 26%
2018	Governor	Evers 71% - 28%
2018	Secretary of State	La Follette 72% - 28%
2018	Attorney General	Kaul 69% - 29%
2018	Treasurer	Godlewski 70% - 28%
2020	President	Biden 70% - 28%
2022	Senate	Barnes 72% - 28%
2022	Governor	Evers 73% - 26%
2022	Secretary of State	La Follette 70% - 26%
2022	Attorney General	Kaul 72% - 28%
2022	Treasurer	Richardson 70% - 28%
2024	President	Harris 69% - 29%
2024	Senate	Baldwin 70% - 29%
