= Gibbs Lake =

Gibbs Lake may refer to:

- Gibbs Lake (New York)
- Gibbs Lake (Wisconsin)
