= 2022 Wisconsin Secretary of State election =

- November 8, 2022
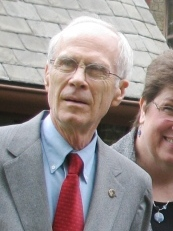

Nominee	Doug La Follette	Amy Loudenbeck
Party	Democratic	Republican
Popular vote	1,268,748	1,261,306
Percentage	48.30%	48.01%
- La Follette: 40–50% 50–60% 60–70% 70–80% 80–90% >90% Loudenbeck: 40–50% 50–60% 60–70% 70–80% 80–90% >90% Tie: 40–50% 50% No data
Secretary of State before election
Doug La Follette
Democratic
Elected Secretary of State
Doug La Follette
Democratic

The 2022 Wisconsin Secretary of State election took place on November 8, 2022, to elect the Secretary of State of Wisconsin. Incumbent Democrat Doug La Follette won re-election to an unprecedented 12th term in the office, narrowly defeating Republican state legislator Amy Loudenbeck. With a margin of 0.29%, this was the closest secretary of state race of the 2022 election cycle.

== Background ==
The secretary of state is one of Wisconsin's six constitutional officers. Once one of the most powerful offices in the state, its role has slowly been diminished as duties were reassigned or eliminated over time. In 1974 election oversight was stripped from the duties of the office and in 2013 the office lost the ability to delay the publicization of laws passed by the legislature, a move which helped unions prepare for Act 10's implementation.

As part of broader attempts to overturn the 2020 United States presidential election, Republicans, having historically weakened the office, began a push to put election oversight back under the purview of the secretary of state, as opposed to the Wisconsin Elections Commission, which Republicans had created to replace the previous nonpartisan Government Accountability Board, which oversaw elections and ethics.

== Democratic primary ==
=== Candidates ===
==== Nominee ====
- Doug La Follette, incumbent secretary of state

==== Eliminated in primary ====
- Alexia Sabor, chair of the Dane County Democratic Party

=== Endorsements ===
Alexia Sabor

Statewide officials

- Barbara Lawton, former lieutenant governor of Wisconsin (2003–2011)

=== Polling ===
Poll source	Date(s) administered	Sample size (Note: Key: A – all adults RV – registered voters LV – likely voters V – unclear)	Margin of error	Doug La Follette	Alexia Sabor	Undecided
Change Research (D) (Note: This poll was sponsored by 314 Action Fund)	July 1–7, 2022	560 (LV)	± 4.6%	42%	9%	43%

=== Results ===
Primary results by county: La Follette: 50–60%; 60–70%; 70–80%

Democratic primary results
Party	Candidate	Votes	%
Democratic	Doug La Follette (incumbent)	300,773	63.63%
Democratic	Alexia Sabor	171,954	36.37%
Total votes		472,727	100.0%

== Republican primary ==
=== Candidates ===
==== Nominee ====
- Amy Loudenbeck, state assemblywoman

==== Eliminated in primary ====
- Daniel Schmidtka
- Jay Schroeder, nominee for secretary of state in 2018

==== Withdrew before primary ====
- Dmitry Becker (endorsed Loudenbeck)

=== Endorsements ===
Amy Loudenbeck

U.S. Representatives

- Bryan Steil, U.S. Representative from Wisconsin's 1st congressional district
- Tom Tiffany, U.S. Representative from Wisconsin's 7th congressional district

Statewide officials

- Ben Brancel, former Wisconsin Secretary of Agriculture, Trade, and Consumer Protection (2011–2017)
- Scott McCallum, former Governor of Wisconsin (2001–2003)
- Tommy Thompson, former Governor of Wisconsin (1987–2001)
- Cathy "Cate" Zeuske, former State Treasurer of Wisconsin 1991–1995)

State legislators

- 61 state legislators

Individuals

- Dmitry Becker, former opponent in primary
- Diane Hendricks, co-founder and chair of ABC Supply

Organizations

- Wisconsin Fraternal Order of Police
- Wisconsin Grocers Association
- Wisconsin Young Republicans
Jay Schroeder

State legislators

- Jim Marchant, former Nevada assemblyman (2016–2018), Republican nominee for Nevada secretary of state in 2022
Declined to endorse

Organizations

- Republican Party of Wisconsin

=== Results ===
Primary results by county: Loudenbeck: 40–50%; 50–60%; 60–70%; 70–80%; Schroeder: 40–50%

Republican primary results
Party	Candidate	Votes	%
Republican	Amy Loudenbeck	264,940	46.32%
Republican	Jay Schroeder	228,191	39.90%
Republican	Justin Daniel Schmidtka	78,846	13.78%
Total votes		571,977	100.0%

== Libertarian primary ==
=== Candidates ===
==== Nominee ====
- Neil Harmon

=== Results ===
Libertarian primary results
Party	Candidate	Votes	%
Libertarian	Neil Harmon	769	100.0%
Total votes		769	100.0%

== General election ==
=== Predictions ===
Source	Ranking	As of
Sabato's Crystal Ball	Tossup	November 3, 2022
Elections Daily	Lean R (flip)	November 7, 2022

=== Polling ===
Poll source	Date(s) administered	Sample size	Margin of error	Doug La Follette (D)	Amy Loudenbeck (R)	Other	Undecided
CNN/SSRS	October 13–17, 2022	905 (RV)	± 4.2%	47%	46%	6% (Note: "Neither" with 4%; "Other" with 2%)	1%
CNN/SSRS	October 13–17, 2022	714 (LV)	± 4.5%	49%	48%	2% (Note: "Neither" with 1%; "Other" with 1%)	1%

=== Results ===
2022 Wisconsin Secretary of State election
Party	Candidate	Votes	%	±%
Democratic	Doug La Follette (incumbent)	1,268,748	48.30%	−4.44%
Republican	Amy Loudenbeck	1,261,306	48.01%	+0.83%
Libertarian	Neil Harmon	54,413	2.07%	N/A
Green	Sharyl R. McFarland	41,532	1.58%	N/A
Write-in		944	0.04%	-0.04%
Total votes		2,626,943	100.00%	N/A
Democratic hold				

==== By county ====
County	Doug La Follette Democratic		Amy Loudenbeck Republican		Various candidates Other parties		Margin		Total votes cast
County	#	%	#	%	#	%	#	%	Total votes cast
Adams	3,540	35.96%	5,940	60.34%	365	3.71%	−2,400	−24.38%	9,845
Ashland	3,777	54.63%	2,842	41.11%	295	4.27%	935	13.52%	6,914
Barron	7,079	35.29%	12,322	61.43%	658	3.28%	−5,243	−26.14%	20,059
Bayfield	5,131	55.53%	3,811	41.24%	298	3.23%	1,320	14.29%	9,240
Brown	49,962	44.33%	58,303	51.73%	4,443	3.94%	−8,341	−7.40%	112,708
Buffalo	2,216	36.39%	3,645	59.86%	228	3.74%	−1,429	−23.47%	6,089
Burnett	2,814	34.39%	5,145	62.88%	223	2.73%	−2,331	−28.49%	8,182
Calumet	9,331	37.73%	14,572	58.91%	831	3.36%	−5,241	−21.19%	24,734
Chippewa	11,190	38.76%	16,519	57.22%	1,159	4.01%	−5,329	−18.46%	28,868
Clark	3,522	30.46%	7,642	66.10%	397	3.43%	−4,120	−35.64%	11,561
Columbia	13,102	48.33%	12,980	47.88%	1,028	3.79%	122	0.45%	27,110
Crawford	3,226	46.46%	3,484	50.17%	234	3.37%	−258	−3.72%	6,944
Dane	222,397	74.71%	63,324	21.27%	11,955	4.02%	159,073	53.44%	297,676
Dodge	12,525	32.48%	24,677	64.00%	1,355	3.51%	−12,152	−31.52%	38,557
Door	8,451	49.22%	8,187	47.68%	531	3.09%	264	1.54%	17,169
Douglas	10,049	54.30%	7,735	41.80%	721	3.90%	2,314	12.50%	18,505
Dunn	7,655	41.64%	9,950	54.12%	780	4.24%	−2,295	−12.48%	18,385
Eau Claire	25,742	53.70%	19,906	41.53%	2,287	4.77%	5,836	12.17%	47,935
Florence	615	24.60%	1,833	73.32%	52	2.08%	−1,218	−48.72%	2,500
Fond du Lac	15,684	34.10%	28,803	62.62%	1,507	3.28%	−13,119	−28.52%	45,994
Forest	1,364	33.28%	2,573	62.77%	162	3.95%	−1,209	−29.49%	4,099
Grant	8,496	42.73%	10,634	53.48%	755	3.80%	−2,138	−10.75%	19,885
Green	8,839	50.94%	7,860	45.30%	652	3.76%	979	5.64%	17,351
Green Lake	2,579	29.96%	5,758	66.89%	271	3.15%	−3,179	−36.93%	8,608
Iowa	6,431	55.82%	4,662	40.47%	427	3.71%	1,769	15.36%	11,520
Iron	1,208	37.28%	1,951	60.22%	81	2.50%	−743	−22.93%	3,240
Jackson	3,283	41.31%	4,352	54.76%	312	3.93%	−1,069	−13.45%	7,947
Jefferson	15,566	40.70%	21,220	55.49%	1,458	3.81%	−5,654	−14.78%	38,244
Juneau	3,706	34.75%	6,599	61.88%	360	3.38%	−2,893	−27.13%	10,665
Kenosha	30,360	46.41%	32,650	49.91%	2,409	3.68%	−2,290	−3.50%	65,419
Kewaunee	3,361	34.21%	6,155	62.65%	309	3.15%	−2,794	−28.44%	9,825
La Crosse	29,488	54.13%	22,391	41.11%	2,593	4.76%	7,097	13.03%	54,472
Lafayette	2,846	43.72%	3,474	53.37%	189	2.90%	−628	−9.65%	6,509
Langlade	2,794	31.18%	5,904	65.89%	262	2.92%	−3,110	−34.71%	8,960
Lincoln	4,948	37.06%	7,953	59.56%	452	3.39%	−3,005	−22.50%	13,353
Manitowoc	13,461	37.91%	20,767	58.49%	1,280	3.60%	−7,306	−20.58%	35,508
Marathon	23,789	38.85%	35,496	57.97%	1,945	3.18%	−11,707	−19.12%	61,230
Marinette	5,743	31.27%	12,048	65.59%	577	3.14%	−6,305	−34.33%	18,368
Marquette	2,523	34.68%	4,534	62.31%	219	3.01%	−2,011	−27.64%	7,276
Menominee	904	75.08%	253	21.01%	47	3.90%	651	54.07%	1,204
Milwaukee	232,340	68.02%	95,754	28.03%	13,495	3.95%	136,586	39.99%	341,589
Monroe	6,410	37.18%	10,223	59.30%	607	3.52%	−3,813	−22.12%	17,240
Oconto	5,611	28.97%	13,059	67.44%	695	3.59%	−7,448	−38.46%	19,365
Oneida	8,139	40.57%	11,215	55.90%	709	3.53%	−3,076	−15.33%	20,063
Outagamie	36,455	42.90%	45,216	53.20%	3,314	3.90%	−8,761	−10.31%	84,985
Ozaukee	21,275	41.08%	28,882	55.76%	1,638	3.16%	−7,607	−14.69%	51,795
Pepin	1,183	36.03%	1,985	60.46%	115	3.50%	−802	−24.43%	3,283
Pierce	7,418	41.22%	9,752	54.20%	824	4.58%	−2,334	−12.97%	17,994
Polk	7,068	34.63%	12,576	61.61%	768	3.76%	−5,508	−26.98%	20,412
Portage	16,865	50.63%	15,127	45.41%	1,318	3.96%	1,738	5.22%	33,310
Price	2,477	35.32%	4,303	61.35%	234	3.34%	−1,826	−26.03%	7,014
Racine	36,151	44.70%	41,781	51.67%	2,934	3.63%	−5,630	−6.96%	80,866
Richland	3,141	45.05%	3,592	51.52%	239	3.43%	−451	−6.47%	6,972
Rock	34,044	52.59%	28,588	44.16%	2,104	3.25%	5,456	8.43%	64,736
Rusk	2,072	32.51%	4,098	64.29%	204	3.20%	−2,026	−31.79%	6,374
Sauk	14,243	49.65%	13,440	46.85%	1,005	3.50%	803	2.80%	28,688
Sawyer	3,525	41.40%	4,783	56.18%	206	2.42%	−1,258	−14.78%	8,514
Shawano	5,400	30.32%	11,772	66.11%	636	3.57%	−6,372	−35.78%	17,808
Sheboygan	20,974	39.60%	30,003	56.65%	1,984	3.75%	−9,029	−17.05%	52,961
St. Croix	17,041	38.90%	24,836	56.70%	1,928	4.40%	−7,795	−17.79%	43,805
Taylor	2,190	25.41%	6,150	71.36%	278	3.23%	−3,960	−45.95%	8,618
Trempealeau	4,827	39.68%	6,884	56.59%	453	3.72%	−2,057	−16.91%	12,164
Vernon	6,101	46.57%	6,443	49.18%	557	4.25%	−342	−2.61%	13,101
Vilas	4,732	36.12%	8,008	61.13%	360	2.75%	−3,276	−25.01%	13,100
Walworth	16,507	36.17%	27,641	60.56%	1,493	3.27%	−11,134	−24.39%	45,641
Washburn	3,042	36.68%	4,986	60.12%	266	3.21%	−1,944	−23.44%	8,294
Washington	21,041	28.70%	50,072	68.30%	2,203	3.00%	−29,031	−39.60%	73,316
Waukesha	81,432	36.74%	133,635	60.29%	6,584	2.97%	−52,203	−23.55%	221,651
Waupaca	7,522	32.64%	14,734	63.93%	791	3.43%	−7,212	−31.29%	23,047
Waushara	3,547	31.51%	7,336	65.17%	374	3.32%	−3,789	−33.66%	11,257
Winnebago	33,431	45.41%	36,811	50.00%	3,377	4.59%	−3,380	−4.59%	73,619
Wood	12,847	39.28%	18,767	57.39%	1,089	3.33%	−5,920	−18.10%	32,703
Totals	1,268,748	48.30%	1,261,306	48.01%	96,889	3.69%	7,442	0.28%	2,626,943

Counties that flipped from Democratic to Republican

- Crawford (largest city: Prairie du Chien)
- Grant (largest city: Platteville)
- Jackson (largest city: Black River Falls)
- Kenosha (largest city: Kenosha)
- Lafayette (largest city: Darlington)
- Racine (largest city: Racine)
- Richland (largest city: Richland Center)
- Vernon (largest city: Viroqua)
- Winnebago (largest city: Oshkosh)

==== By congressional district ====
Despite losing the state, Loudenbeck won 6 of 8 congressional districts.

District	La Follette	Loudenbeck	Representative
1st	46%	50%	Bryan Steil
2nd	70%	26%	Mark Pocan
3rd	46%	50%	Ron Kind (117th Congress)
3rd	46%	50%	Derrick Van Orden (118th Congress)
4th	75%	21%	Gwen Moore
5th	36%	61%	Scott L. Fitzgerald
6th	40%	56%	Glenn Grothman
7th	38%	58%	Tom Tiffany
8th	40%	56%	Mike Gallagher

== Notes ==
Partisan clients
