= Wisconsin's 4th congressional district =

U.S. House district for Wisconsin

Coordinates: 42°54′30″N 87°50′36″W

- Interactive map of district boundaries since January 3, 2023
- Representative: Gwen Moore; D–Milwaukee
- Area: 548.02 mi^{2} (1,419.4 km^{2})
- Distribution: 99.97% urban; 0.03% rural
- Population (2025): 724,367
- Median household income: $63,627
- Ethnicity: 42.15% White; 30.53% Black; 19.29% Hispanic; 16.88% Two or more races; 5.79% Asian; 3.58% other; 1.07% Native American; 0.01% Pacific Islander Americans
- Cook PVI: D+26
- Created: 1863

Wisconsin's 4th congressional district is a congressional district of the United States House of Representatives in Wisconsin, encompassing a part of Milwaukee County and including almost all of the city of Milwaukee (except the slivers of the city in Waukesha and Washington counties), as well as its working-class suburbs of Cudahy, St. Francis, South Milwaukee, and West Milwaukee. Recent redistricting has added the Milwaukee County North Shore communities of Glendale, Shorewood, Whitefish Bay, Fox Point, Bayside, and Brown Deer to the district. It is currently represented by Gwen Moore, a Democrat.

With a Cook Partisan Voting Index rating of D+26, it is the most Democratic district in Wisconsin. John Kerry won 69% of the vote here in 2004. Barack Obama also swept the district in 2008, by a three-to-one margin over John McCain, with 75.39% of the vote to McCain's 23.61%.

Before the 2000 census, the 4th covered much of south Milwaukee, and extended into eastern Waukesha County. After Wisconsin lost a district in the 2000 census, the 4th was cut back to a Milwaukee County district.

== Composition ==
For the 118th and successive Congresses (based on redistricting following the 2020 census), the district contains all or portions of the following counties, towns, and municipalities:

Milwaukee County (12)

Bayside, Brown Deer, Fox Point, Glendale, Greenfield (part; also 5th), Milwaukee, River Hills, Shorewood, Wauwatosa, West Allis (part; also 5th), West Milwaukee, Whitefish Bay

== Recent election results from statewide races ==
Year	Office	Results
2008	President	Obama 73% - 26%
2010	Senate	Feingold 68% - 32%
2010	Governor	Barrett 68% - 31%
2010	Secretary of State	La Follette 72% - 28%
2010	Attorney General	Hassett 64% - 36%
2010	Treasurer	Marie Sass 68% - 32%
2012	President	Obama 74% - 26%
2012	Senate	Baldwin 71% - 27%
2012	Governor (Recall)	Barrett 70% - 30%
2014	Governor	Burke 70% - 29%
2014	Secretary of State	La Follette 71% - 26%
2014	Attorney General	Happ 68% - 29%
2014	Treasurer	Sartori 67% - 28%
2016	President	Clinton 72% - 22%
2016	Senate	Feingold 70% - 28%
2018	Senate	Baldwin 77% - 22%
2018	Governor	Evers 73% - 25%
2018	Secretary of State	La Follette 76% - 23%
2018	Attorney General	Kaul 73% - 25%
2018	Treasurer	Godlewski 75% - 23%
2020	President	Biden 76% - 23%
2022	Senate	Barnes 77% - 23%
2022	Governor	Evers 78% - 21%
2022	Secretary of State	La Follette 75% - 21%
2022	Attorney General	Kaul 77% - 23%
2022	Treasurer	Richardson 75% - 23%
2024	President	Harris 75% - 23%
2024	Senate	Baldwin 75% - 22%

== List of members representing the district ==
#	Member	Party	Years	Cong ress	Electoral history	District
District established March 4, 1863
1	Charles A. Eldredge (Fond du Lac)	Democratic	March 4, 1863 – March 3, 1873	38th 39th 40th 41st 42nd	Elected in 1862. Re-elected in 1864. Re-elected in 1866. Re-elected in 1868. Re-elected in 1870. Redistricted to the 5th district.	Dodge, Fond du Lac, Ozaukee, Sheboygan, & Washington counties
2	Alexander Mitchell (Milwaukee)	Democratic	March 4, 1873 – March 3, 1875	43rd	Redistricted from the 1st district and re-elected in 1872. Retired.	Milwaukee, Ozaukee, & Washington counties
3	William Pitt Lynde (Milwaukee)	Democratic	March 4, 1875 – March 3, 1879	44th 45th	Elected in 1874. Re-elected in 1876. Retired.	Milwaukee, Ozaukee, & Washington counties
4	Peter V. Deuster (Milwaukee)	Democratic	March 4, 1879 – March 3, 1885	46th 47th 48th	Elected in 1878. Re-elected in 1880. Re-elected in 1882. Lost re-election.	Milwaukee, Ozaukee, & Washington counties
4	Peter V. Deuster (Milwaukee)	Democratic	March 4, 1879 – March 3, 1885	46th 47th 48th	Elected in 1878. Re-elected in 1880. Re-elected in 1882. Lost re-election.	Milwaukee County
5	Isaac W. Van Schaick (Milwaukee)	Republican	March 4, 1885 – March 3, 1887	49th	Elected in 1884. Retired.	Milwaukee County
6	Henry Smith (Milwaukee)	Union Labor	March 4, 1887 – March 3, 1889	50th	Elected in 1886. Lost re-election.	Milwaukee County
7	Isaac W. Van Schaick (Milwaukee)	Republican	March 4, 1889 – March 3, 1891	51st	Elected in 1888. Retired to run for state senator.	Milwaukee County
8	John L. Mitchell (Milwaukee)	Democratic	March 4, 1891 – March 3, 1893	52nd	Elected in 1890. Re-elected in 1892 but resigned when elected U.S. senator.	Milwaukee County
Vacant			March 3, 1893 – August 27, 1893	53rd		Southern Milwaukee County: Town of Franklin; Town of Greenfield; Town of Lake; Town of Oak Creek; Wards 1-9, 11, 12, 14-18, city of Milwaukee
9	Peter J. Somers (Milwaukee)	Democratic	August 27, 1893 – March 3, 1895	53rd	Elected to finish Mitchell's term. Retired.	Southern Milwaukee County: Town of Franklin; Town of Greenfield; Town of Lake; Town of Oak Creek; Wards 1-9, 11, 12, 14-18, city of Milwaukee
10	Theobald Otjen (Milwaukee)	Republican	March 4, 1895 – March 3, 1907	54th 55th 56th 57th 58th 59th	Elected in 1894. Re-elected in 1896. Re-elected in 1898. Re-elected in 1900. Re-elected in 1902. Re-elected in 1904. Lost renomination.	Southern Milwaukee County: Town of Franklin; Town of Greenfield; Town of Lake; Town of Oak Creek; Wards 1-9, 11, 12, 14-18, city of Milwaukee
10	Theobald Otjen (Milwaukee)	Republican	March 4, 1895 – March 3, 1907	54th 55th 56th 57th 58th 59th	Elected in 1894. Re-elected in 1896. Re-elected in 1898. Re-elected in 1900. Re-elected in 1902. Re-elected in 1904. Lost renomination.	Southern Milwaukee County: Town of Franklin; Town of Greenfield; Town of Lake; Town of Oak Creek; Town of Wauwatosa; Village of Cudahy; City of South Milwaukee; City of Wauwatosa; Wards 2-5, 7, 8, 11, 12, 14-17, 23, city of Milwaukee
11	William J. Cary (Milwaukee)	Republican	March 4, 1907 – March 3, 1919	60th 61st 62nd 63rd 64th 65th	Elected in 1906. Re-elected in 1908. Re-elected in 1910. Re-elected in 1912. Re-elected in 1914. Re-elected in 1916. Lost renomination.	Southern Milwaukee County: Town of Franklin; Town of Greenfield; Town of Lake; Town of Oak Creek; Town of Wauwatosa; Village of Cudahy; City of South Milwaukee; City of Wauwatosa; Wards 2-5, 7, 8, 11, 12, 14-17, 23, city of Milwaukee
11	William J. Cary (Milwaukee)	Republican	March 4, 1907 – March 3, 1919	60th 61st 62nd 63rd 64th 65th	Elected in 1906. Re-elected in 1908. Re-elected in 1910. Re-elected in 1912. Re-elected in 1914. Re-elected in 1916. Lost renomination.	Southern Milwaukee County: Town of Franklin; Town of Greenfield; Town of Lake; Town of Oak Creek; Town of Wauwatosa; Village of Cudahy; Village of West Milwaukee; City of South Milwaukee; City of Wauwatosa; City of West Allis; Wards 3-5, 8, 11, 12, 14, 16, 17, 23, 24, city of Milwaukee
12	John C. Kleczka (Milwaukee)	Republican	March 4, 1919 – March 3, 1923	66th 67th	Elected in 1918. Re-elected in 1920. Retired.	Southern Milwaukee County: Town of Franklin; Town of Greenfield; Town of Lake; Town of Oak Creek; Town of Wauwatosa; Village of Cudahy; Village of West Milwaukee; City of South Milwaukee; City of Wauwatosa; City of West Allis; Wards 3-5, 8, 11, 12, 14, 16, 17, 23, 24, city of Milwaukee
13	John C. Schafer (Milwaukee)	Republican	March 4, 1923 – March 3, 1933	68th 69th 70th 71st 72nd	Elected in 1922. Re-elected in 1924. Re-elected in 1926. Re-elected in 1928. Re-elected in 1930. Lost re-election.	Southern Milwaukee County: Town of Franklin; Town of Greenfield; Town of Lake; Town of Oak Creek; Town of Wauwatosa; Village of Cudahy; Village of West Milwaukee; City of South Milwaukee; City of Wauwatosa; City of West Allis; Wards 3-5, 8, 11, 12, 14, 16, 17, 23, 24, city of Milwaukee
14	Raymond Joseph Cannon (Milwaukee)	Democratic	March 4, 1933 – January 3, 1939	73rd 74th 75th	Elected in 1932. Re-elected in 1934. Re-elected in 1936. Lost renomination and lost re-election as an independent.	Southern Milwaukee County: Town of Franklin; Town of Greenfield; Town of Lake; Town of Oak Creek; Town of Wauwatosa; Village of West Milwaukee; City of Cudahy; City of South Milwaukee; City of Wauwatosa; City of West Allis; Wards 3-5, 8, 11, 12, 14, 16, 17, 23, 24, 27, city of Milwaukee
15	John C. Schafer (Milwaukee)	Republican	January 3, 1939 – January 3, 1941	76th	Elected in 1938. Lost re-election.	Southern Milwaukee County: Town of Franklin; Town of Greenfield; Town of Lake; Town of Oak Creek; Town of Wauwatosa; Village of West Milwaukee; City of Cudahy; City of South Milwaukee; City of Wauwatosa; City of West Allis; Wards 3-5, 8, 11, 12, 14, 16, 17, 23, 24, 27, city of Milwaukee
16	Thad F. Wasielewski (Milwaukee)	Democratic	January 3, 1941 – January 3, 1947	77th 78th 79th	Elected in 1940. Re-elected in 1942. Re-elected in 1944. Lost renomination and lost re-election as an independent.	Southern Milwaukee County: Town of Franklin; Town of Greenfield; Town of Lake; Town of Oak Creek; Town of Wauwatosa; Village of West Milwaukee; City of Cudahy; City of South Milwaukee; City of Wauwatosa; City of West Allis; Wards 3-5, 8, 11, 12, 14, 16, 17, 23, 24, 27, city of Milwaukee
17	John C. Brophy (Milwaukee)	Republican	January 3, 1947 – January 3, 1949	80th	Elected in 1946. Lost re-election.	Southern Milwaukee County: Town of Franklin; Town of Greenfield; Town of Lake; Town of Oak Creek; Town of Wauwatosa; Village of West Milwaukee; City of Cudahy; City of South Milwaukee; City of Wauwatosa; City of West Allis; Wards 3-5, 8, 11, 12, 14, 16, 17, 23, 24, 27, city of Milwaukee
18	Clement J. Zablocki (Milwaukee)	Democratic	January 3, 1949 – December 3, 1983	81st 82nd 83rd 84th 85th 86th 87th 88th 89th 90th 91st 92nd 93rd 94th 95th 96th 97th 98th	Elected in 1948. Re-elected in 1950. Re-elected in 1952. Re-elected in 1954. Re-elected in 1956. Re-elected in 1958. Re-elected in 1960. Re-elected in 1962. Re-elected in 1964. Re-elected in 1966. Re-elected in 1968. Re-elected in 1970. Re-elected in 1972. Re-elected in 1974. Re-elected in 1976. Re-elected in 1978. Re-elected in 1980. Re-elected in 1982. Died.	Southern Milwaukee County: Town of Franklin; Town of Greenfield; Town of Lake; Town of Oak Creek; Town of Wauwatosa; Village of West Milwaukee; City of Cudahy; City of South Milwaukee; City of Wauwatosa; City of West Allis; Wards 3-5, 8, 11, 12, 14, 16, 17, 23, 24, 27, city of Milwaukee
18	Clement J. Zablocki (Milwaukee)	Democratic	January 3, 1949 – December 3, 1983	81st 82nd 83rd 84th 85th 86th 87th 88th 89th 90th 91st 92nd 93rd 94th 95th 96th 97th 98th	Elected in 1948. Re-elected in 1950. Re-elected in 1952. Re-elected in 1954. Re-elected in 1956. Re-elected in 1958. Re-elected in 1960. Re-elected in 1962. Re-elected in 1964. Re-elected in 1966. Re-elected in 1968. Re-elected in 1970. Re-elected in 1972. Re-elected in 1974. Re-elected in 1976. Re-elected in 1978. Re-elected in 1980. Re-elected in 1982. Died.	Southern Milwaukee County: Village of Greendale; Village of Hales Corners; Village of West Milwaukee; City of Cudahy; City of Franklin; City of Greenfield; City of Oak Creek; City of St. Francis; City of South Milwaukee; City of West Allis; The part of the city of Milwaukee south of the Menomonee River
18	Clement J. Zablocki (Milwaukee)	Democratic	January 3, 1949 – December 3, 1983	81st 82nd 83rd 84th 85th 86th 87th 88th 89th 90th 91st 92nd 93rd 94th 95th 96th 97th 98th	Elected in 1948. Re-elected in 1950. Re-elected in 1952. Re-elected in 1954. Re-elected in 1956. Re-elected in 1958. Re-elected in 1960. Re-elected in 1962. Re-elected in 1964. Re-elected in 1966. Re-elected in 1968. Re-elected in 1970. Re-elected in 1972. Re-elected in 1974. Re-elected in 1976. Re-elected in 1978. Re-elected in 1980. Re-elected in 1982. Died.	Southern Milwaukee County: Village of Greendale; Village of Hales Corners; Village of West Milwaukee; City of Cudahy; City of Franklin; City of Greenfield; City of Oak Creek; City of St. Francis; City of South Milwaukee; City of Wauwatosa; City of West Allis; The part of the city of Milwaukee south of St. Paul Ave. and east of 39th St.
18	Clement J. Zablocki (Milwaukee)	Democratic	January 3, 1949 – December 3, 1983	81st 82nd 83rd 84th 85th 86th 87th 88th 89th 90th 91st 92nd 93rd 94th 95th 96th 97th 98th	Elected in 1948. Re-elected in 1950. Re-elected in 1952. Re-elected in 1954. Re-elected in 1956. Re-elected in 1958. Re-elected in 1960. Re-elected in 1962. Re-elected in 1964. Re-elected in 1966. Re-elected in 1968. Re-elected in 1970. Re-elected in 1972. Re-elected in 1974. Re-elected in 1976. Re-elected in 1978. Re-elected in 1980. Re-elected in 1982. Died.	Southern Milwaukee County & southeast Waukesha County: Milwaukee County; Village of Greendale; Village of Hales Corners; Village of West Milwaukee; City of Cudahy; City of Franklin; City of Greenfield; City of Oak Creek; City of St. Francis; City of South Milwaukee; City of West Allis; The part of the city of Milwaukee south of the line extending from the point where I-94 intersects with the western city limits, following I-94 east to the point where it intersects with the Menomonee River, then following the river east to the point where it intersects with the Milwaukee River, then north to E. Juneau Ave., east to N. Van Buren St., south to E. State St., east 1 block, south 1 block, then east on E. Kilbourn Ave. to the lake; Waukesha County; Town of Vernon; Town of Waukesha; Village of Big Bend; City of Muskego; City of New Berlin; The part of the city of Waukesha south of a line extending from the point where the right-of-way of the M.St.P. & S.S.M. railroad intersects the northern city limits, south along the right-of-way of the M.St.P. & S.S.M. railroad to Moreland Blvd., then east to Murray Ave., north to Catherine St., east to Highland Ave., north to Josephine St., east to Cardinal Dr., north to Atlantic Dr., east to Empire Dr., northeasterly on Empire Dr. and Wolf Rd. to the city limits
Vacant			December 3, 1983 – April 3, 1984	98th		
19	Jerry Kleczka (Milwaukee)	Democratic	April 3, 1984 – January 3, 2005	98th 99th 100th 101st 102nd 103rd 104th 105th 106th 107th 108th	Elected to finish Zablocki's term. Re-elected in 1984. Re-elected in 1986. Re-elected in 1988. Re-elected in 1990. Re-elected in 1992. Re-elected in 1994. Re-elected in 1996. Re-elected in 1998. Re-elected in 2000. Re-elected in 2002. Retired.	
19	Jerry Kleczka (Milwaukee)	Democratic	April 3, 1984 – January 3, 2005	98th 99th 100th 101st 102nd 103rd 104th 105th 106th 107th 108th	Elected to finish Zablocki's term. Re-elected in 1984. Re-elected in 1986. Re-elected in 1988. Re-elected in 1990. Re-elected in 1992. Re-elected in 1994. Re-elected in 1996. Re-elected in 1998. Re-elected in 2000. Re-elected in 2002. Retired.	1993–2003
19	Jerry Kleczka (Milwaukee)	Democratic	April 3, 1984 – January 3, 2005	98th 99th 100th 101st 102nd 103rd 104th 105th 106th 107th 108th	Elected to finish Zablocki's term. Re-elected in 1984. Re-elected in 1986. Re-elected in 1988. Re-elected in 1990. Re-elected in 1992. Re-elected in 1994. Re-elected in 1996. Re-elected in 1998. Re-elected in 2000. Re-elected in 2002. Retired.	2003–2013
20	Gwen Moore (Milwaukee)	Democratic	January 3, 2005 – present	109th 110th 111th 112th 113th 114th 115th 116th 117th 118th 119th	Elected in 2004. Re-elected in 2006. Re-elected in 2008. Re-elected in 2010. Re-elected in 2012. Re-elected in 2014. Re-elected in 2016. Re-elected in 2018. Re-elected in 2020. Re-elected in 2022. Re-elected in 2024. Re-elected in 2026.	2003–2013
20	Gwen Moore (Milwaukee)	Democratic	January 3, 2005 – present	109th 110th 111th 112th 113th 114th 115th 116th 117th 118th 119th	Elected in 2004. Re-elected in 2006. Re-elected in 2008. Re-elected in 2010. Re-elected in 2012. Re-elected in 2014. Re-elected in 2016. Re-elected in 2018. Re-elected in 2020. Re-elected in 2022. Re-elected in 2024. Re-elected in 2026.	2013–2023
20	Gwen Moore (Milwaukee)	Democratic	January 3, 2005 – present	109th 110th 111th 112th 113th 114th 115th 116th 117th 118th 119th	Elected in 2004. Re-elected in 2006. Re-elected in 2008. Re-elected in 2010. Re-elected in 2012. Re-elected in 2014. Re-elected in 2016. Re-elected in 2018. Re-elected in 2020. Re-elected in 2022. Re-elected in 2024. Re-elected in 2026.	2023–present

== Recent election results ==
=== 2002 district boundaries (2002–2011) ===
Year	Date	Elected				Defeated				Total	Plurality
2002	Nov. 5	Jerry Kleczka (inc)	Democratic	122,031	86.32%	Brian Verdin	Rep.	18,324	12.96%	141,367	103,707
2004	Nov. 2	Gwen Moore	Democratic	212,382	69.60%	Gerald H. Boyle	Rep.	85,928	28.16%	305,142	126,454
2004	Nov. 2	Gwen Moore	Democratic	212,382	69.60%	Tim Johnson	Ind.	3,733	1.22%	305,142	126,454
2004	Nov. 2	Gwen Moore	Democratic	212,382	69.60%	Robert R. Raymond	Ind.	1,861	0.61%	305,142	126,454
2004	Nov. 2	Gwen Moore	Democratic	212,382	69.60%	Colin Hudson	Con.	897	0.29%	305,142	126,454
2006	Nov. 7	Gwen Moore (inc)	Democratic	136,735	71.31%	Perfecto Rivera	Rep.	54,486	28.42%	191,742	82,249
2008	Nov. 4	Gwen Moore (inc)	Democratic	222,728	87.63%	Michael D. LaForest	Rep.	29,282	11.52%	254,179	193,446
2010	Nov. 2	Gwen Moore (inc)	Democratic	143,559	68.98%	Dan Sebring	Rep.	61,543	29.57%	208,103	82,016
2010	Nov. 2	Gwen Moore (inc)	Democratic	143,559	68.98%	Eddie Ahmad Ayyash	Ind.	2,802	1.35%	208,103	82,016

=== 2011 district boundaries (2012–2021) ===
Year	Date	Elected				Defeated				Total	Plurality
2012	Nov. 6	Gwen Moore (inc)	Democratic	235,257	72.21%	Dan Sebring	Rep.	80,787	24.80%	325,788	154,470
2012	Nov. 6	Gwen Moore (inc)	Democratic	235,257	72.21%	Robert R. Raymond	Ind.	9,277	2.85%	325,788	154,470
2014	Nov. 4	Gwen Moore (inc)	Democratic	179,045	70.24%	Dan Sebring	Rep.	68,490	26.87%	254,892	110,555
2014	Nov. 4	Gwen Moore (inc)	Democratic	179,045	70.24%	Robert R. Raymond	Ind.	7,002	2.75%	254,892	110,555
2016	Nov. 8	Gwen Moore (inc)	Democratic	220,181	76.74%	Robert R. Raymond	Ind.	33,494	11.67%	254,892	110,555
2016	Nov. 8	Gwen Moore (inc)	Democratic	220,181	76.74%	Andy Craig	Lib.	32,183	11.22%	254,892	110,555
2018	Nov. 6	Gwen Moore (inc)	Democratic	206,487	75.61%	Tim Rogers	Rep.	59,091	21.64%	273,087	147,396
2018	Nov. 6	Gwen Moore (inc)	Democratic	206,487	75.61%	Robert R. Raymond	Ind.	7,170	2.63%	273,087	147,396
2020	Nov. 3	Gwen Moore (inc)	Democratic	232,668	74.65%	Tim Rogers	Rep.	70,769	22.70%	311,697	161,899
2020	Nov. 3	Gwen Moore (inc)	Democratic	232,668	74.65%	Robert R. Raymond	Ind.	7,911	2.54%	311,697	161,899

=== 2022 district boundaries (2022–2031) ===
Year	Date	Elected				Defeated				Total	Plurality
2022	Nov. 8	Gwen Moore (inc)	Democratic	191,955	75.27%	Tim Rogers	Rep.	57,660	22.61%	255,012	134,295
2022	Nov. 8	Gwen Moore (inc)	Democratic	191,955	75.27%	Robert R. Raymond	Ind.	5,164	2.03%	255,012	134,295
2024	Nov. 5	Gwen Moore (inc)	Democratic	249,938	74.8	Tim Rogers	Rep.	74,921	22.4	334,282	

== See also ==
- Wisconsin's congressional districts
- List of United States congressional districts
