= 2014 Wisconsin State Treasurer election =

2014 Wisconsin State Treasurer Election
- November 4, 2014
Candidate	Matt Adamczyk	Dave Sartori
Party	Republican	Democratic
Popular vote	1,120,140	1,026,548
Percentage	48.80%	44.73%
- Adamczyk: 40–50% 50–60% 60–70% 70–80% Sartori: 40–50% 50–60% 60–70% 70–80%
Treasurer before election
Kurt W. Schuller
Republican
Elected Treasurer
Matt Adamczyk
Republican

The 2014 Wisconsin State Treasurer election took place on November 4, 2014, to elect the State Treasurer of Wisconsin. Incumbent attorney general Kurt W. Schuller, first elected in 2010, did not seek re-election to a second term. Matt Adamczyk defeated Greenfield alderman Dave Sartori in the November general election.

== Republican primary ==
=== Candidates ===
==== Nominee ====
- Matt Adamczyk, legislative staffer

==== Eliminated in the primary ====
- Randall Melchert, attorney

=== Results ===
Republican primary results
Party	Candidate	Votes	%
Republican	Matt Adamczyk	132,596	61.8
Republican	Randall Melchert	82,108	38.2
Total votes		214,074	100

== Democratic primary ==
=== Candidates ===
==== Nominee ====
- Dave Sartori, former Greenfield alderman

==== Eliminated in the primary ====
- Dave Leeper, former Green County District Attorney

=== Results ===
Democratic primary results
Party	Candidate	Votes	%
Democratic	Dave Sartori	119,504	51.6
Democratic	Dave Leeper	112,225	48.4
Total votes		231,729	100

== General election ==
=== Candidates ===
- Matt Adamczyk, legislative staffer (R)
- Dave Sartori, former Greenfield alderman (D)
- Jerry Shidell, former Rhinelander mayor (L)
- Andrew Zuelke, businessman (C)
- Ron Hardy, Winnebago County Supervisor (G)

=== Polling ===
Hypothetical polling

Poll source	Date(s) administered	Sample size	Margin of error	Randall Melchert (R)	Dave Leeper (D)	Ron Hardy (G)	Undecided
Gravis Marketing	September 22–23, 2014	908	± 3%	38%	35%	10%	17%
Gravis Marketing	July 31–August 2, 2014	1,346	± 3%	39%	31%	12%	18%

=== Results ===
Wisconsin State Treasurer Election, 2014
Party	Candidate	Votes	%	±%
Republican	Matt Adamczyk	1,120,140	48.80%	−4.59%
Democratic	Dave Sartori	1,026,548	44.73%	−1.74%
Green	Ron Hardy	66,120	2.88%	
Libertarian	Jerry Shidell	53,113	2.31%	
Constitution	Andrew Zuelke	28,053	1.22%	
	Write-ins	1,244	0.05%	
Plurality		93,592	4.08%	-2.85%
Total votes		2,295,218	100.0%	
Republican hold				

==== By congressional districts ====
Adamczyk won 5 of 8 congressional districts.

District	Adamczyk	Sartori	Representative
1st	56%	39%	Paul Ryan
2nd	32%	60%	Mark Pocan
3rd	46%	47%	Ron Kind
4th	26%	69%	Gwen Moore
5th	65%	30%	Jim Sensenbrenner
6th	56%	38%	Glenn Grothman
7th	52%	41%	Sean Duffy
8th	55%	38%	Reid Ribble
