= Janesville (town), Wisconsin =

Town of Janesville, Wisconsin
- Town
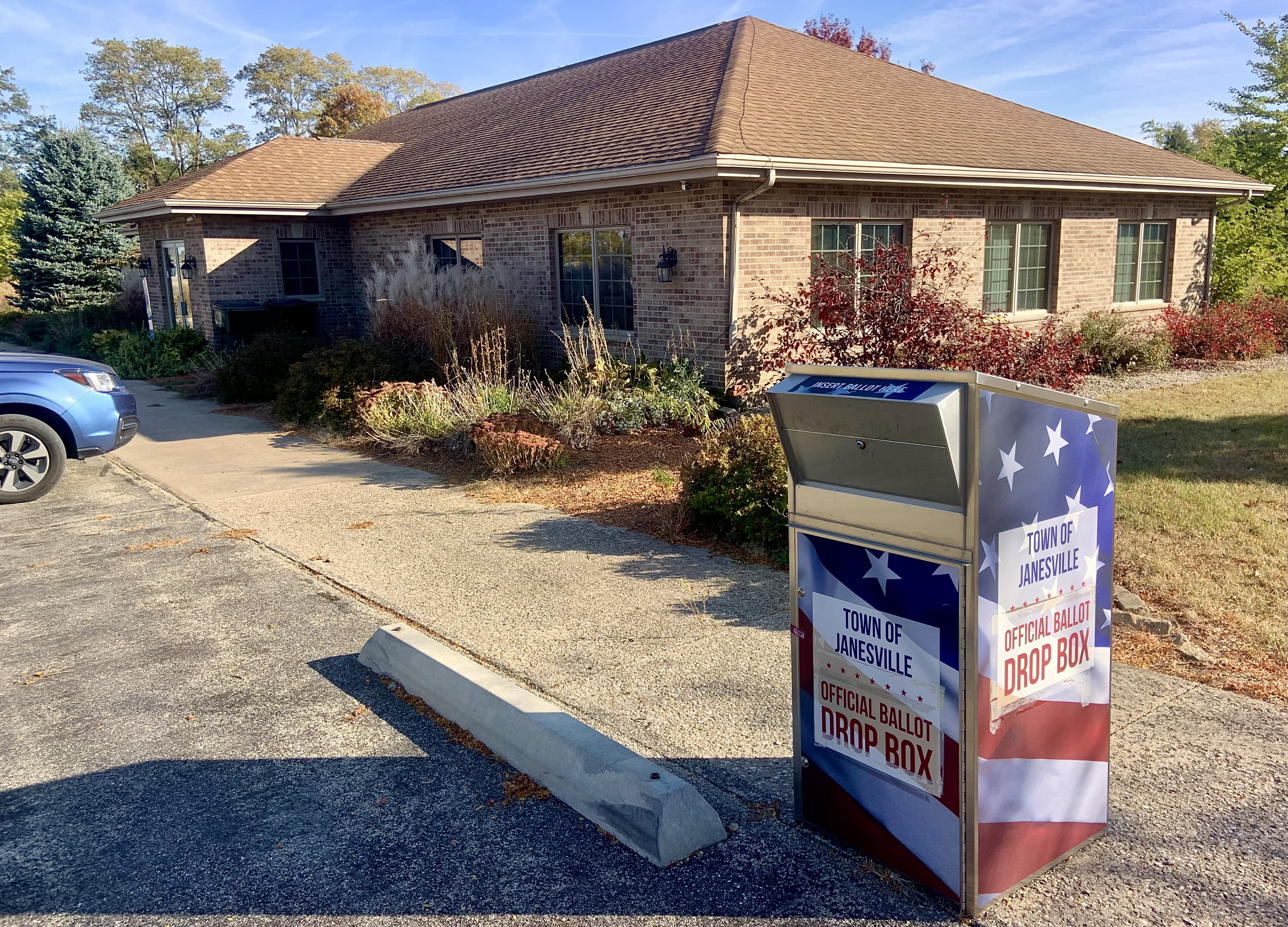
- Town hall

- Location in Rock County and the state of Wisconsin.
- Coordinates: 42°43′32″N 89°4′34″W
- Country: United States
- State: Wisconsin
- County: Rock

Area
  - Total: 28.6 sq mi (74.0 km^{2})
  - Land: 28.1 sq mi (72.7 km^{2})
  - Water: 0.46 sq mi (1.2 km^{2})
- Elevation: 863 ft (263 m)

Population (2020)
  - Total: 3,665
  - Density: 134/sq mi (51.6/km^{2})
- Time zone: UTC-6 (Central (CST))
  - Summer (DST): UTC-5 (CDT)
- Area code: 608
- FIPS code: 55-37850
- GNIS feature ID: 1583449
- Website: townofjanesville.org

The Town of Janesville is a civil township in Rock County, Wisconsin, United States. The population was 3,665 at the 2020 census. The City of Janesville is southeast of and adjacent to the town. The unincorporated communities of Anderson and Leyden are in the town.

== Geography ==
According to the United States Census Bureau, the town has a total area of 28.6 square miles (74.0 km^{2}), of which 28.1 square miles (72.8 km^{2}) is land and 0.5 square mile (1.2 km^{2}) (1.65%) is water.

One of the lakes located in the Town of Janesville is Gibbs Lake.

== Demographics ==
As of the census of 2000, there were 3,750 people, 1,137 households, and 908 families residing in the town. The population density was 133.5 people per square mile (51.5/km^{2}). There were 1,206 housing units at an average density of 42.9 per square mile (16.6/km^{2}). The racial makeup of the town was 93.20% White, 4.67% Black or African American, 0.27% Native American, 0.48% Asian, 0.05% Pacific Islander, 0.67% from other races, and 0.67% from two or more races. 1.47% of the population were Hispanic or Latino of any race.

There were 1,137 households, out of which 34.1% had children under the age of 18 living with them, 72.5% were married couples living together, 4.5% had a female householder with no husband present, and 20.1% were non-families. 15.3% of all households were made up of individuals, and 4.7% had someone living alone who was 65 years of age or older. The average household size was 2.67 and the average family size was 2.98.

In the town, the population was spread out, with 22.2% under the age of 18, 8.7% from 18 to 24, 30.5% from 25 to 44, 26.0% from 45 to 64, and 12.6% who were 65 years of age or older. The median age was 40 years. For every 100 females, there were 118.7 males. For every 100 females age 18 and over, there were 120.4 males.

The median income for a household in the town was $68,567, and the median income for a family was $71,523. Males had a median income of $46,131 versus $27,866 for females. The per capita income for the town was $25,656. About 1.7% of families and 2.1% of the population were below the poverty line, including 1.8% of those under age 18 and 2.0% of those age 65 or over.
