= John J. Maurer =

American politician and airline pilot (1922–2019)

John Maurer

Secretary of the Wisconsin Department of Veterans Affairs
- In office May 1985 – January 31, 1992
- Governor: Tony Earl; Tommy Thompson
- Preceded by: John B. Ellery
- Succeeded by: Raymond G. Boland

Member of the Wisconsin Senate from the 22nd district
- In office April 8, 1975 – January 7, 1985
- Preceded by: Doug La Follette
- Succeeded by: Joseph F. Andrea

Chairman of the Pleasant Prairie Town Board
- In office 1969–1975

Member of the Pleasant Prairie Town Board
- In office 1961–1963

Personal details
- Born: John Joseph Maurer Jr. July 11, 1922 Kenosha, Wisconsin, U.S.
- Died: March 31, 2019 (aged 96) Pleasant Prairie, Wisconsin
- Resting place: Green Ridge Cemetery; Kenosha, Wisconsin
- Party: Democratic
- Spouse: Arlene Kulin
- Children: Lisa (Walls); Thomas
- Education: University of Wisconsin–Parkside
- Profession: Airline pilot

Military service
- Allegiance: United States
- Branch/service: United States Army; U.S. Army Air Forces
- Years of service: 1942–1945
- Unit: 15th Air Force
- Battles/wars: World War II: European theatre

John Joseph Maurer Jr. (July 11, 1922 – March 31, 2019) was an American politician and airline pilot from Kenosha, Wisconsin. He was a member of the Wisconsin Senate from 1975 through 1985, and was the Secretary of the Wisconsin Department of Veterans Affairs from 1985 through 1992.

== Biography ==
Born in Kenosha, Wisconsin, to Anna (Schuenemann) and John Maurer, Sr. He graduated from Kenosha High School (Now Mary D. Bradford High School) in 1940. He joined the United States Army Air Forces in 1942 for service in World War II. He was a B-24 pilot in the European theater and served with distinction.

After the war, he attended Marquette University and was a commercial airline pilot for Capital Airlines and United Airlines. He retired as a DC-10 Captain from United Airlines.

He was a member of the Air Line Pilots Association, International, and the Air Force Association.

== Political career ==
Maurer's career in politics began with his term as a member of the Pleasant Prairie Board of Supervisors, from 1961 to 1963. In 1969, Maurer was elected chairman of the Town Board, and he remained in that position until 1975.

Maurer ran for the Wisconsin Senate for the first time in 1972, but lost in the Democratic Primary to Doug La Follette. La Follette went on to win the general election, but resigned two years later after he was elected Wisconsin Secretary of State in the 1974 election.

Maurer decided to run again in the April 1975 special election to finish La Follette's term. Maurer went on to win the election and was re-elected in 1976 and 1980. His colleagues elected him Majority Caucus Chairman from 1981 through the end of his senate term.

Maurer ran for the newly-created role of Kenosha County Executive in 1982, but was defeated by Gilbert Dosemagen.

He chose not to seek re-election in 1984, but in 1985 he was appointed to be Secretary of the Wisconsin Department of Veterans Affairs by Wisconsin Governor Tony Earl. Earl lost re-election in 1986, but his successor, Tommy Thompson, chose not to replace Maurer. Maurer continued as Secretary of Veterans Affairs until his retirement in January 1992.

During his time as Secretary, Maurer was instrumental in the creation of the Wisconsin Veterans Museum on Capital Square, in Madison, Wisconsin. In honor of his accomplishments as Secretary, the Department of Veterans Affairs named a building after him (Maurer Hall) in Union Grove.

== Family and personal life ==
John Maurer married Arlene Kulin on December 25, 1977. They had two children, Lisa and Thomas.

Maurer died in March 2019 at the age of 96, at his home in Pleasant Prairie.
