= 2014 Wisconsin Secretary of State election =

2014 Wisconsin Secretary of State Election
- November 4, 2014
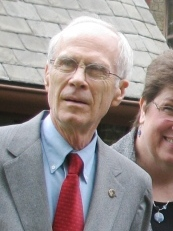

Candidate	Doug La Follette	Julian Bradley
Party	Democratic	Republican
Popular vote	1,161,113	1,074,835
Percentage	50.00%	46.29%
- La Follette: 40–50% 50–60% 60–70% 70–80% Bradley: 40–50% 50–60% 60–70% 70–80%
Secretary of State before election
Doug La Follette
Democratic
Elected Secretary of State
Doug La Follette
Democratic

The 2014 Wisconsin Secretary of State Election took place on November 4, 2014, to elect the Wisconsin Secretary Of State. It occurred concurrently with other elections across Wisconsin. Incumbent Doug La Follette was re-elected to his tenth term as Secretary of State of Wisconsin, taking 50% of the vote in the November general election. La Follette defeated La Crosse Republican Julian Bradley.

State Representative Garey Bies was defeated in the Republican primary.

== Democratic primary ==
- Incumbent Secretary of State Doug La Follette ran unopposed for the Democratic nomination.

== Republican primary ==
=== Candidates ===
==== Nominee ====
- Julian Bradley, Telecommunications manager

==== Eliminated in the primary ====
- Garey Bies, State Representative

=== Results ===
Republican primary results
Party	Candidate	Votes	%
Republican	Julian Bradley	138,734	64.8
Republican	Garey Bies	75,340	35.2
Total votes		214,074	100

== General election ==
=== Polling ===
Poll source	Date(s) administered	Sample size	Margin of error	Doug La Follette (D)	Julian Bradley (R)	Undecided
Gravis Marketing	October 3–4, 2014	837	± 3%	44%	43%	13%
Gravis Marketing	September 22–23, 2014	908	± 3%	50%	37%	13%
Gravis Marketing	July 31–August 2, 2014	1,346	± 3%	46%	39%	15%

=== Results ===
Wisconsin Secretary of State Election, 2014
Party	Candidate	Votes	%	±%
Democratic	Doug La Follette (incumbent)	1,161,113	50.00%	−1.61%
Republican	Julian Bradley	1,074,835	46.29%	−2.01%
Independent	Andy Craig	58,996	2.54%	
Constitution	Jerry Broitzman	25,744	1.11%	
	Write-ins	1,347	0.06%	
Plurality		86,278	3.72%	+0.40%
Total votes		2,322,035	100.0%	+11.57%
Democratic hold				

=== By congressional district ===
Despite losing the state, Bradley won 5 of 8 congressional districts.

District	La Follette	Bradley	Representative
1st	44%	53%	Paul Ryan
2nd	67%	29%	Mark Pocan
3rd	52%	44%	Ron Kind
4th	73%	24%	Gwen Moore
5th	35%	62%	Jim Sensenbrenner
6th	43%	54%	Glenn Grothman
7th	46%	51%	Sean Duffy
8th	44%	52%	Reid Ribble
