= Gibbs Lake (New York) =

- Location of Gibbs Lake within New York
- Location: Herkimer County, New York
- Coordinates: 43°43′57″N 75°00′03″W
- Type: Lake
- Basin countries: United States
- Surface area: 46 acres (0.072 mi^{2}; 19 ha)
- Surface elevation: 1,854 feet (565 m)
- Settlements: Old Forge

Gibbs Lake is a small lake northwest of Old Forge in Herkimer County, New York. It drains north via an unnamed creek which flows into Half Moon Pond.

== See also ==
- List of lakes in New York
