= Leyden, Wisconsin =

- Unincorporated community
- Location within Wisconsin Location within the United States
- Coordinates: 42°43′51″N 89°07′44″W
- Country: United States
- State: Wisconsin
- County: Rock
- Elevation: 892 ft (272 m)
- Time zone: UTC-6 (Central (CST))
  - Summer (DST): UTC-5 (CDT)
- Area code: 608
- GNIS feature ID: 1568004

Leyden is an unincorporated community located in the town of Janesville, Rock County, Wisconsin, United States.

== History ==
A post office called Leyden was established in 1850, and remained in operation until it was discontinued in 1903. The community was named after Leiden, in the Netherlands.
