= Half Moon Pond =

- Location of Half Moon Pond within New York
- Location: Herkimer County, New York
- Coordinates: 43°44′05″N 75°00′46″W
- Type: Lake
- Basin countries: United States
- Surface area: 21 acres (8.5 ha)
- Surface elevation: 1,834 feet (559 m)
- Settlements: Old Forge

Half Moon Pond is a small lake northwest of Old Forge in Herkimer County, New York. It drains southwest via an unnamed creek which flows into South Inlet.

== See also ==
- List of lakes in New York
