= 2018 Wisconsin Secretary of State election =

2018 Wisconsin Secretary of State Election
- November 6, 2018
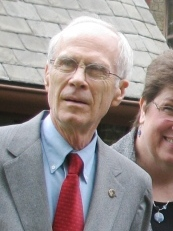

Candidate	Doug La Follette	Jay Schroeder
Party	Democratic	Republican
Popular vote	1,380,752	1,235,034
Percentage	52.74%	47.18%
- La Follette: 50–60% 60–70% 70–80% Schroeder: 50–60% 60–70% 70–80%
Secretary of State before election
Doug La Follette
Democratic
Elected Secretary of State
Doug La Follette
Democratic

The 2018 Wisconsin Secretary of State election took place on November 6, 2018, to elect the Wisconsin Secretary Of State. It occurred concurrently with a Senate election in the state, elections to the state's U.S. House seats, and various other elections. Incumbent Doug La Follette, who had been serving in the position since 1983, won re-election to a 10th four-year term, defeating Republican nominee Jay Schroeder with 52.74% of the vote.

Schroeder, La Follette's opponent, made a pledge to abolish the position entirely if elected. This was likely a response to the power of the office slowly being weakened ever since 1990, with more and more powers the office once had going to the legislature, other agencies, or being abolished entirely. According to analyses published by the Council of State Governments, the office is the weakest directly elected member of the National Association of Secretaries of State.

== Background ==
In 1974, La Follette was elected to his first term as Secretary of State. He served for one four-year term, but did not run for re-election in order to run for lieutenant governor in 1978. He was succeeded as Secretary of State by Vel Phillips. After losing his bid for lieutenant governor, La Follette primaried Phillips in 1982 and subsequently won the general election. La Follette had run for re-election every cycle, and had been re-elected every time, even as the governorship and other offices at the top of the ticket went to the Republicans. Since returning in 1982, power had slowly been stripped from the office and instead given to jurisdictions. These powers include lobbying regulation and business registration, which La Follette had long advocated for the return of.

Though he had won most of his re-election campaigns with ease, 2010 was his closest result since 1986, winning only by 2%. This close result can be attributed to the red wave year of 2010, which saw many big wins for Wisconsin Republicans, including the ousting of popular Democratic senator Russ Feingold, as well as Scott Walker winning the governorship by 5% on the same ticket. La Follette was able to improve on his margin in 2014, winning by 4% under similar circumstances as the 2010 election, but this was still a notable decrease based on the results he had had in the past. The 2018 elections were expected to be very favorable for Democrats, making La Follette a favorite going into it.

== Democratic primary ==
Incumbent Doug La Follette was challenged from the left by Arvina Martin, a member of Madison Common Council. La Follette won the primary decisively, receiving 65% of the vote, and notably carrying all counties, including Dane County, home to Madison, which both candidates are from.

=== Nominated ===
- Doug La Follette, incumbent secretary of state, candidate for governor in the 2012 recall election, former state senator from the 22nd district

=== Eliminated in primary ===
- Arvina Martin, member of the Madison Common Council

=== Results ===
Results by county: La Follette: 50-60% 60–70% 70-80%

Democratic primary results
Party	Candidate	Votes	%
Democratic	Doug La Follette (incumbent)	327,020	65.9
Democratic	Arvina Martin	169,130	34.1
Total votes		496,150	100.0

== Republican primary ==
=== Nominated ===
- Jay Harvey Schroeder

=== Eliminated in primary ===
- Spencer Zimmerman, perennial candidate

=== Results ===
Republican primary results
Party	Candidate	Votes	%
Republican	Jay Harvey Schroeder	254,424	71.4
Republican	Spencer Zimmerman	101,818	28.6
Total votes		356,242	100.0

== General election ==
=== Predictions ===
Source	Ranking	As of
Governing	Safe D	October 11, 2018

=== Results ===
With La Follette holding the position for so long, the race was seen to be not very competitive. In the end, La Follette won by six percentage points.

Wisconsin Secretary of State election, 2018
Party	Candidate	Votes	%	±%
Democratic	Doug La Follette (incumbent)	1,380,752	52.74%	+2.74%
Republican	Jay Schroeder	1,235,034	47.18%	+0.91%
Write-in		2,162	0.08%	+0.02%
Total votes		2,617,948	100.00%	
Democratic hold				

==== By county ====
	La Follette Democratic		Schroeder Republican		Write-ins		Margin		Total
County	#	%	#	%	#	%	#	%	#
Adams	4,104	44.62%	5,094	55.38%	0	0.00%	-990	-10.76%	9,198
Ashland	4,294	63.22%	2,493	36.70%	5	0.07%	1,801	26.52%	6,792
Barron	7,995	43.69%	10,300	56.28%	6	0.03%	-2,305	-12.59%	18,295
Bayfield	5,315	61.20%	3,368	38.78%	1	0.01%	1,947	22.42%	8,684
Brown	55,195	48.79%	57,858	51.14%	86	0.08%	-2,663	-2.35%	113,139
Buffalo	2,628	45.14%	3,191	54.81%	3	0.05%	-563	-9.67%	5,822
Burnett	2,959	39.59%	4,515	60.41%	0	0.00%	-1,556	-20.82%	7,474
Calumet	9,758	42.03%	13,457	57.96%	1	0.01%	-3,699	-15.93%	23,216
Chippewa	12,529	46.17%	14,607	53.83%	0	0.00%	-2,078	-7.66%	27,136
Clark	4,599	40.38%	6,786	59.59%	3	0.03%	-2,187	-19.21%	11,388
Columbia	14,368	54.02%	12,211	45.91%	19	0.07%	2,157	8.11%	26,598
Crawford	3,567	54.94%	2,925	45.05%	1	0.02%	642	9.89%	6,493
Dane	219,538	75.93%	69,184	23.93%	428	0.15%	150,354	52.00%	289,150
Dodge	14,527	39.30%	22,440	60.70%	2	0.01%	-7,913	-21.40%	36,969
Door	8,480	50.98%	8,141	48.94%	13	0.08%	339	2.04%	16,690
Douglas	11,243	60.70%	7,269	39.25%	9	0.05%	3,974	21.45%	18,521
Dunn	9,019	49.72%	9,118	50.27%	1	0.01%	-99	-0.55%	18,138
Eau Claire	27,636	57.85%	20,088	42.05%	48	0.10%	7,548	15.80%	47,772
Florence	676	31.43%	1,475	68.57%	0	0.00%	-799	-37.15%	2,151
Fond du Lac	17,631	39.79%	26,649	60.14%	30	0.07%	-9,018	-20.35%	44,310
Forest	1,635	42.63%	2,197	57.29%	3	0.08%	-562	-14.66%	3,835
Grant	9,772	51.01%	9,378	48.96%	6	0.03%	394	2.05%	19,156
Green	9,595	57.29%	7,144	42.65%	10	0.06%	2,451	14.64%	16,749
Green Lake	2,836	35.23%	5,211	64.73%	3	0.04%	-2,375	-29.50%	8,050
Iowa	6,819	62.29%	4,124	37.67%	5	0.05%	2,385	24.62%	10,948
Iron	1,366	45.01%	1,669	54.99%	0	0.00%	-303	-9.98%	3,035
Jackson	4,041	51.38%	3,824	48.62%	0	0.00%	217	2.76%	7,865
Jefferson	16,781	45.06%	20,437	54.87%	27	0.07%	-3,656	-9.81%	37,218
Juneau	4,249	42.64%	5,710	57.31%	5	0.05%	-1,461	-14.67%	9,964
Kenosha	35,781	53.67%	30,829	46.24%	63	0.09%	4,952	7.43%	66,673
Kewaunee	3,926	41.97%	5,420	57.94%	9	0.10%	-1,494	-15.97%	9,355
La Crosse	33,060	59.33%	22,663	40.67%	0	0.00%	10,397	18.66%	55,723
Lafayette	3,347	52.14%	3,071	47.84%	1	0.02%	276	4.30%	6,419
Langlade	3,395	37.57%	5,630	62.31%	11	0.12%	-2,235	-24.74%	9,036
Lincoln	5,662	43.18%	7,439	56.73%	12	0.09%	-1,777	-13.55%	13,113
Manitowoc	15,354	44.17%	19,388	55.78%	19	0.05%	-4,034	-11.61%	34,761
Marathon	26,567	43.66%	34,239	56.27%	44	0.07%	-7,672	-12.61%	60,850
Marinette	6,662	39.14%	10,356	60.85%	2	0.01%	-3,694	-21.71%	17,020
Marquette	3,044	43.14%	4,006	56.77%	6	0.09%	-962	-13.63%	7,056
Menominee	847	78.14%	237	21.86%	0	0.00%	610	56.27%	1,084
Milwaukee	269,143	70.18%	113,770	29.67%	575	0.15%	155,373	40.51%	383,488
Monroe	7,347	44.41%	9,182	55.50%	16	0.10%	-1,835	-11.09%	16,545
Oconto	6,276	36.44%	10,936	63.50%	11	0.06%	-4,660	-27.06%	17,223
Oneida	8,540	44.68%	10,553	55.22%	19	0.10%	-2,013	-10.54%	19,112
Outagamie	38,391	47.10%	43,109	52.89%	4	0.01%	-4,718	-5.79%	81,504
Ozaukee	19,801	39.34%	30,480	60.56%	51	0.10%	-10,679	-21.22%	50,332
Pepin	1,374	44.95%	1,683	55.05%	0	0.00%	-309	-10.10%	3,057
Pierce	8,421	48.61%	8,899	51.37%	3	0.02%	-478	-2.76%	17,323
Polk	7,635	41.41%	10,803	58.59%	1	0.00%	-3,168	-17.18%	18,439
Portage	19,075	56.07%	14,916	43.85%	27	0.08%	2,559	12.22%	34,018
Price	2,916	44.33%	3,662	55.67%	0	0.00%	-746	-11.34%	6,578
Racine	42,821	50.02%	42,705	49.88%	88	0.10%	116	0.14%	85,614
Richland	3,648	52.82%	3,253	47.10%	5	0.07%	395	5.72%	6,906
Rock	40,630	60.86%	26,068	39.04%	67	0.10%	14,562	21.84%	66,765
Rusk	2,418	40.38%	3,565	59.54%	5	0.08%	-1,147	-19.16%	5,988
Sauk	15,870	56.00%	12,468	44.00%	0	0.00%	3,402	12.00%	28,338
Sawyer	3,662	45.58%	4,372	54.41%	1	0.01%	-710	-8.83%	8,035
Shawano	6,416	36.50%	11,164	63.50%	0	0.00%	-4,748	-27.00%	17,580
Sheboygan	22,949	43.89%	29,289	56.01%	55	0.11%	-6,340	-12.12%	52,293
St. Croix	17,267	43.54%	22,365	56.39%	27	0.07%	-5,098	-12.85%	39,659
Taylor	2,650	33.70%	5,209	66.24%	5	0.06%	-2,559	-32.54%	7,864
Trempealeau	5,864	49.03%	6,088	50.91%	7	0.06%	-224	-1.88%	11,959
Vernon	6,898	53.92%	5,891	46.05%	3	0.02%	1,007	7.87%	12,792
Vilas	4,901	39.62%	7,464	60.33%	6	0.05%	-2,563	-20.71%	12,371
Walworth	18,499	41.36%	26,200	58.57%	32	0.07%	-7,701	-17.21%	44,731
Washburn	3,374	43.38%	4,401	56.58%	3	0.04%	-1,027	-13.20%	7,778
Washington	20,697	29.80%	48,749	70.20%	0	0.00%	-28,052	-40.39%	69,446
Waukesha	77,918	35.87%	139,149	64.05%	172	0.08%	-61,231	-28.18%	217,239
Waupaca	8,540	38.84%	13,441	61.12%	9	0.04%	-4,901	-22.28%	21,990
Waushara	3,939	37.88%	6,461	62.13%	0	0.00%	-2,522	-24.25%	10,400
Winnebago	37,353	50.20%	36,980	49.70%	72	0.10%	373	0.50%	74,405
Wood	14,719	45.50%	17,618	54.46%	16	0.05%	-2,899	-8.96%	32,353
Totals	1,380,752	52.74%	1,235,034	47.18%	2,162	0.08%	145,718	5.56%	2,617,948

Counties that flipped from Democratic to Republican

- Adams (largest city: Adams)
- Dunn (largest city: Menomonie)
- Forest (largest city: Crandon)
- Juneau (largest city: Mauston)
- Pierce (largest city: River Falls)
- Pepin (largest city: Durand)
- Trempealeau (largest city: Arcadia)
- Vernon (largest city: Viroqua)
- Wood (largest city: Marshfield)

Counties that flipped from Republican to Democratic

- Racine (largest city: Racine)
- Winnebago (largest city: Oshkosh)

==== By congressional district ====
Despite losing the state, Schroeder won five of eight congressional districts.

District	La Follette	Schroeder	Representative
1st	47%	53%	Paul Ryan
2nd	72%	28%	Mark Pocan
3rd	53%	47%	Ron Kind
4th	78%	22%	Gwen Moore
5th	41%	59%	Jim Sensenbrenner
6th	45%	55%	Glenn Grothman
7th	44%	56%	Sean Duffy
8th	45%	55%	Mike Gallagher

== See also ==
- 2018 Wisconsin elections
- 2018 United States elections
