= 2004 United States House of Representatives elections in Wisconsin =

- November 2, 2004

All 8 Wisconsin seats to the United States House of Representatives
| | Majority party | Minority party |
|---|---|---|
| Party | Republican | Democratic |
| Last election | 4 | 4 |
| Seats won | 4 | 4 |
| Seat change | Steady | Steady |
| Popular vote | 1,380,819 | 1,368,537 |
| Percentage | 48.94% | 48.50% |

Democratic
50–60%
60–70%
70–80%
80–90%
90–100%
Republican
50–60%
60–70%
70–80%

Elections for Wisconsin's 8 seats in the United States House of Representatives were held on November 2, 2004. All of the incumbents won reelection except for Jerry Kleczka, who chose to retire.

== Overview ==
2004 United States House of Representatives elections in Wisconsin
| Party | Votes | Percentage | Seats | +/– |
|---|---|---|---|---|
| Republican | 1,380,819 | 48.94% | 4 | 0 |
| Democratic | 1,368,537 | 48.50% | 4 | 0 |
| Green | 36,536 | 1.29% | 0 | 0 |
| Constitution | 13,738 | 0.49% | 0 | 0 |
| Independents | 9,846 | 0.35% | 0 | 0 |
| Libertarian | 9,485 | 0.34% | 0 | 0 |
| Write-ins | 2,652 | 0.09% | 0 | 0 |
| Totals | 2,821,613 | 100.00% | 8 | — |

== District 1 ==
2004 Wisconsin's 1st congressional district election
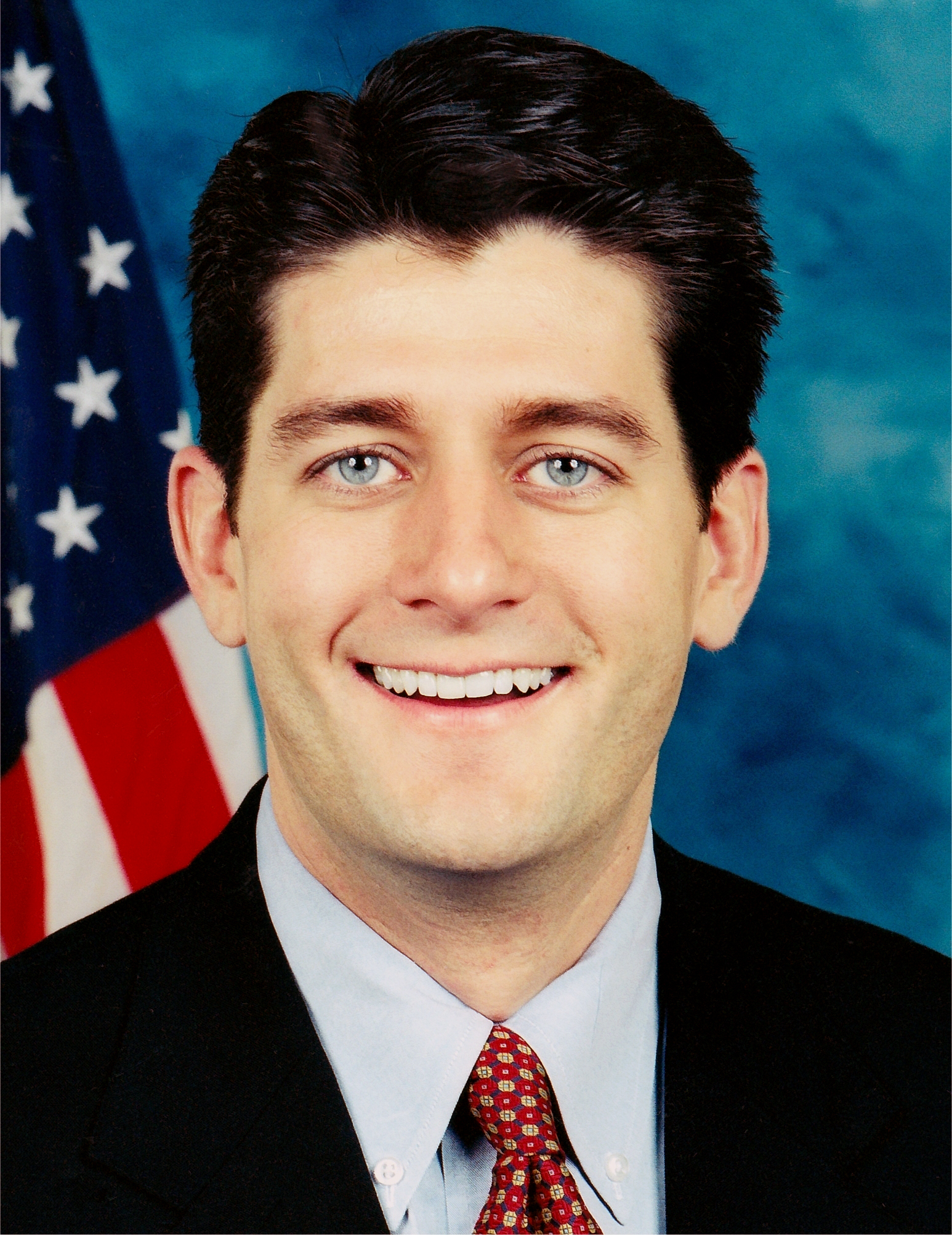

| Nominee | Paul Ryan | Jeffrey C. Thomas |
| Party | Republican | Democratic |
| Popular vote | 233,372 | 116,250 |
| Percentage | 65.37% | 32.57% |
- Precinct results Ryan: 40–50% 50–60% 60–70% 70–80% 80–90% >90% Thomas: 40–50% 50–60% 60–70% 70–80% 80–90% Tie: 40–50% 50% No votes
U.S. Representative before election
Paul Ryan
Republican
Elected U.S. Representative
Paul Ryan
Republican

Paul Ryan was first elected in 1998, and received 67% of the vote in 2002. Jeffrey Chapman Thomas was the Democratic nominee in 2000 and 2002.

Steve Gutschick initially sought the Democratic nomination, but withdrew citing poor fundraising. Chet Bell, the son of the mayor of West Allis, Wisconsin, announced his campaign for the Democratic nomination on June 4, 2004. In July 2004, Ryan had over $1 million in campaign funds compared to $4,212 held by Bell and $5.13 held by Thomas.

2004 Wisconsin U.S. House 1st district election
Primary election
| Party | Candidate | Votes | % |
|---|---|---|---|
| Republican | Paul Ryan (incumbent) | 39,935 | 100.00% |
| Total votes | | 39,935 | 100.00% |
| Democratic | Jeffrey Chapman Thomas | 13,923 | 58.28% |
| Democratic | Chet Bell | 9,966 | 41.72% |
| Total votes | | 23,889 | 100.00% |
| Libertarian | Don Bernau | 117 | 100.00% |
| Total votes | | 117 | 100.00% |
General election
| Republican | Paul Ryan (incumbent) | 233,372 | 65.37% |
| Democratic | Jeffrey Chapman Thomas | 116,250 | 32.57% |
| Independent | Norman Aulabaugh | 4,252 | 0.82% |
| Libertarian | Don Bernau | 2,936 | 5.02% |
| Write-in | | 168 | 0.05% |
| Total votes | | 356,976 | 100.00% |

=== Predictions ===
| Source | Ranking | As of |
|---|---|---|
| The Cook Political Report | Safe R | October 29, 2004 |
| Sabato's Crystal Ball | Safe R | November 1, 2004 |

== District 2 ==
2004 Wisconsin's 2nd congressional district election
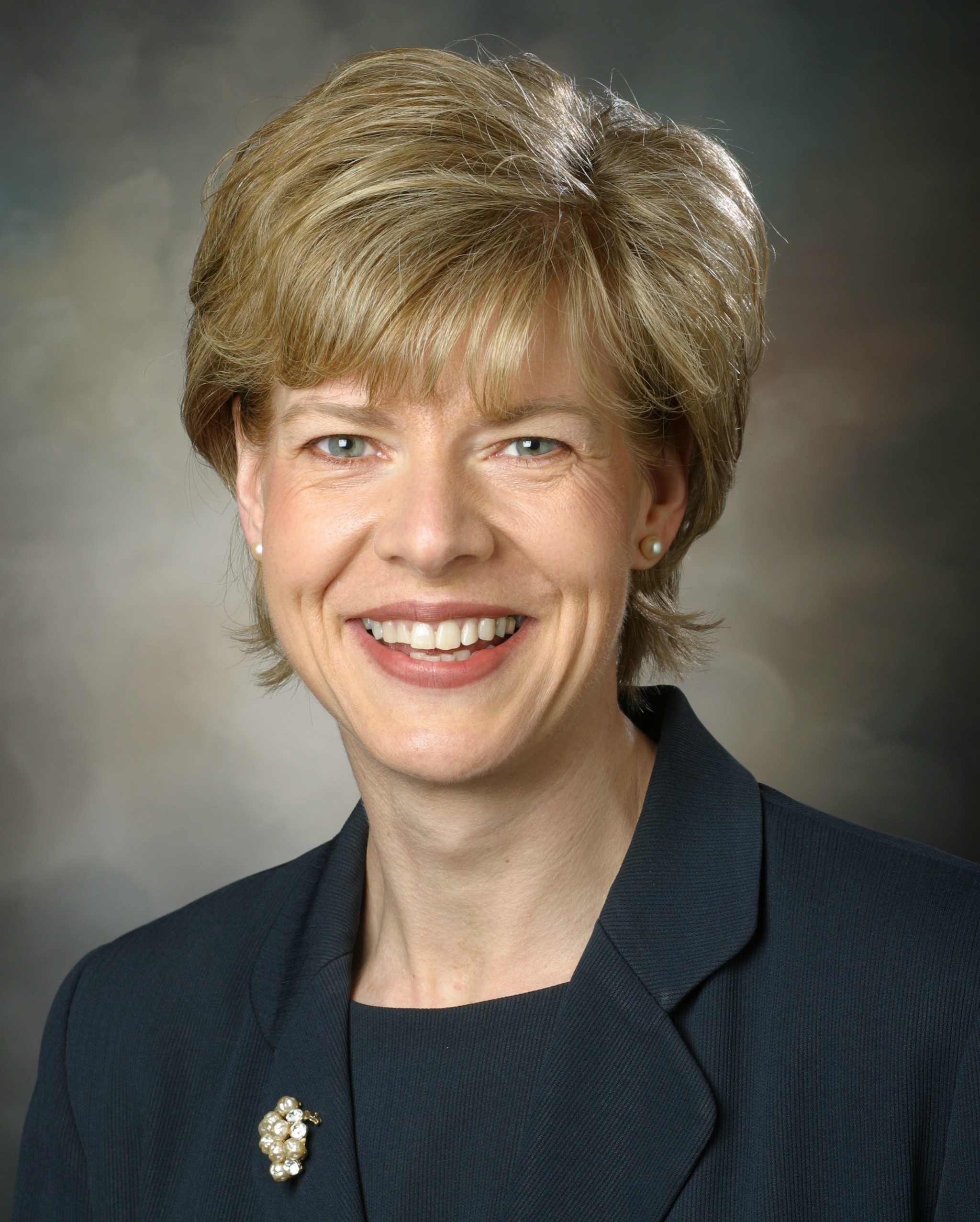

| Nominee | Tammy Baldwin | Dave Magnum |
| Party | Democratic | Republican |
| Popular vote | 251,637 | 145,810 |
| Percentage | 63.27% | 36.66% |
- Precinct results Baldwin: 50–60% 60–70% 70–80% 80–90% >90% Magnum: 40–50% 50–60% 60–70% 70–80% 80–90% Tie: 40–50% 50% No votes
U.S. Representative before election
Tammy Baldwin
Democratic
Elected U.S. Representative
Tammy Baldwin
Democratic

2004 Wisconsin U.S. House 2nd district election
Primary election
| Party | Candidate | Votes | % |
|---|---|---|---|
| Democratic | Tammy Baldwin (incumbent) | 35,904 | 100.00% |
| Total votes | | 35,904 | 100.00% |
| Republican | Dave Magnum | 26,974 | 61.39% |
| Republican | Ron Greer | 16,964 | 38.61% |
| Total votes | | 43,938 | 100.00% |
General election
| Democratic | Tammy Baldwin (incumbent) | 251,637 | 63.27% |
| Republican | Dave Magnum | 145,810 | 36.66% |
| Write-in | | 277 | 0.07% |
| Total votes | | 397,724 | 100.00% |

=== Predictions ===
| Source | Ranking | As of |
|---|---|---|
| The Cook Political Report | Safe D | October 29, 2004 |
| Sabato's Crystal Ball | Safe D | November 1, 2004 |

== District 3 ==
2004 Wisconsin's 3rd congressional district election
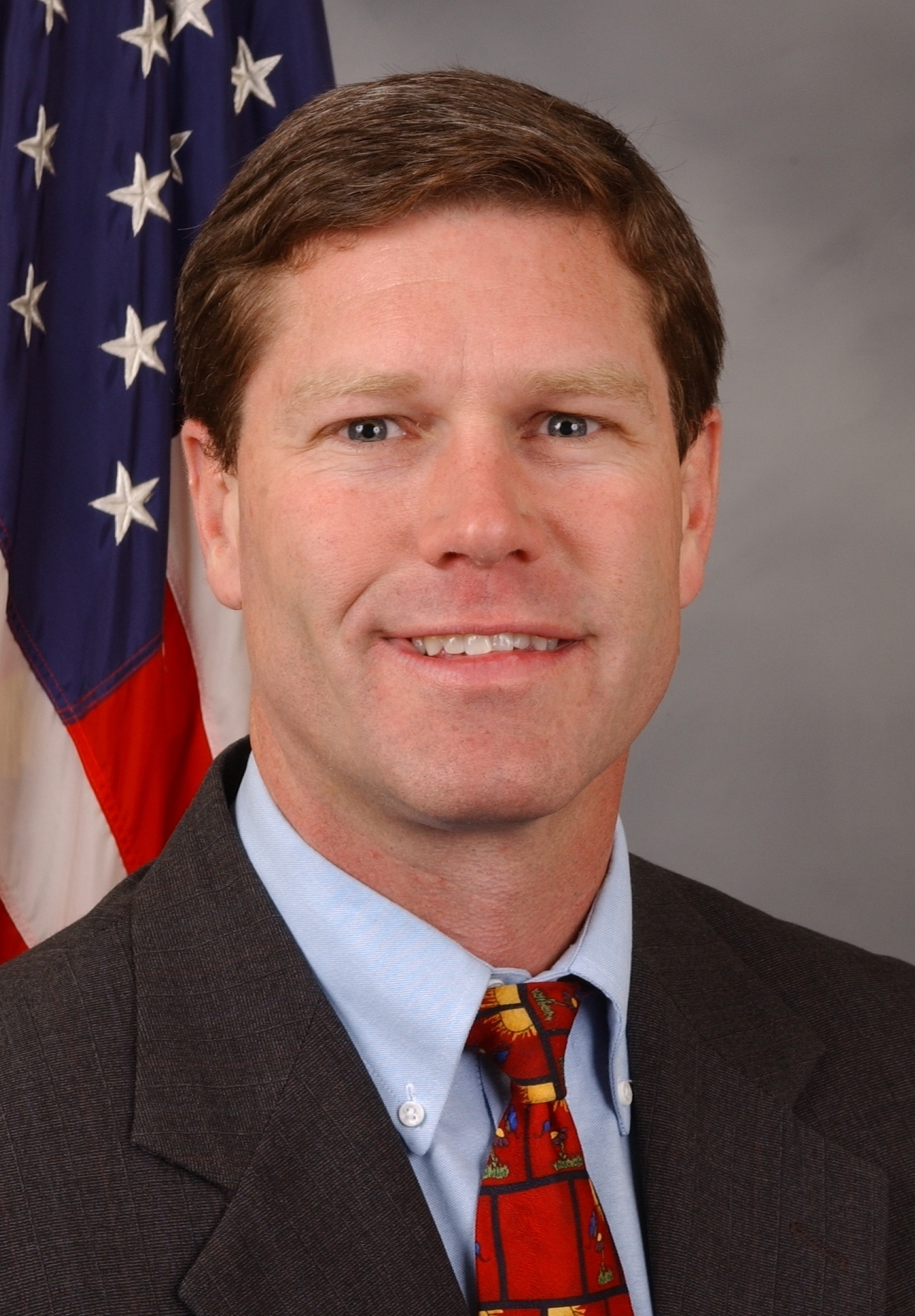

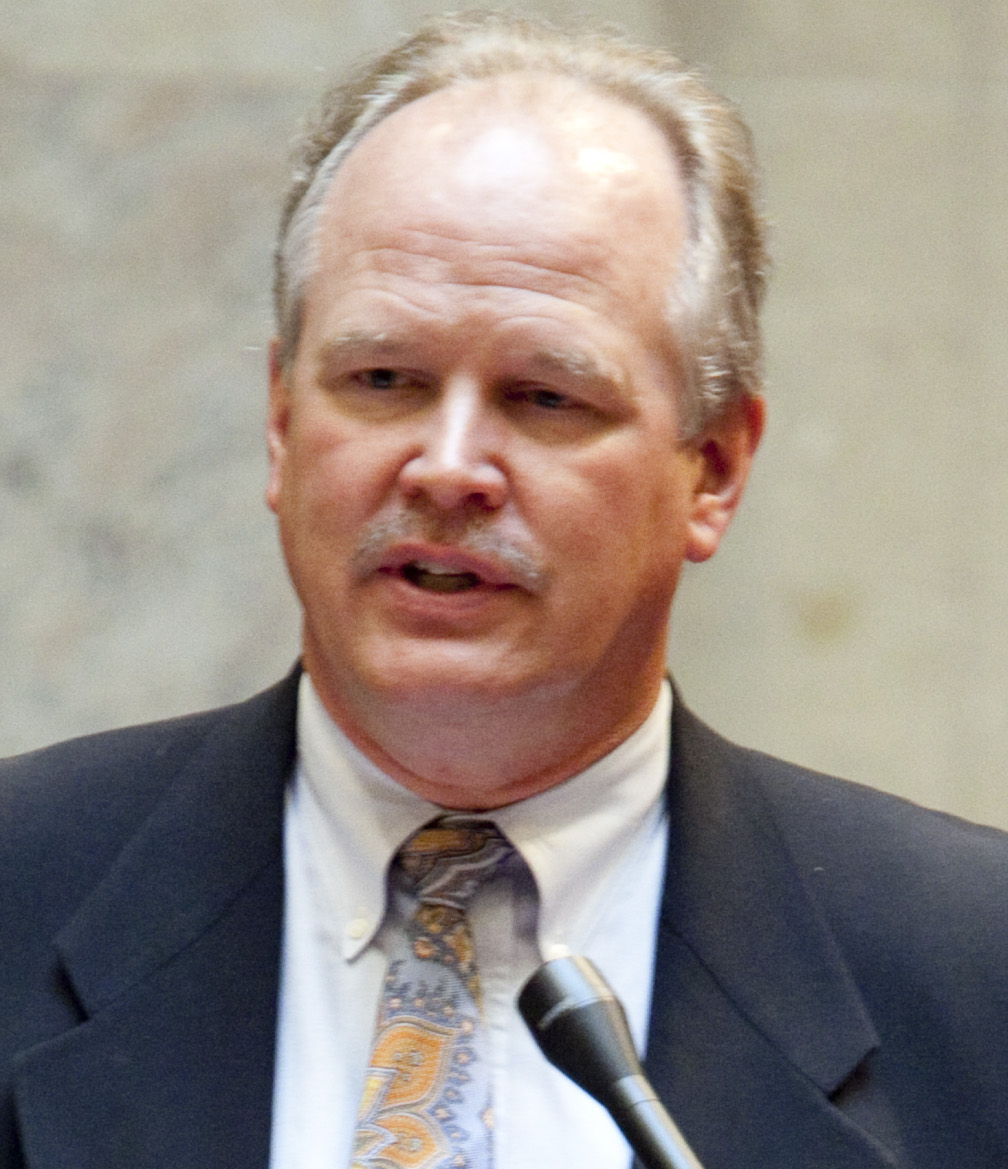
| Nominee | Ron Kind | Dale Schultz |
| Party | Democratic | Republican |
| Popular vote | 204,856 | 157,866 |
| Percentage | 56.43% | 43.49% |
- Kind: 50–60% 60–70% 70–80% 80–90% >90% Schultz: 40–50% 50–60% 60–70% 70–80% 80–90% Tie: 40–50% 50% No votes
U.S. Representative before election
Ron Kind
Democratic
Elected U.S. Representative
Ron Kind
Democratic

2004 Wisconsin U.S. House 3rd district election
Primary election
| Party | Candidate | Votes | % |
|---|---|---|---|
| Democratic | Ron Kind (incumbent) | 29,464 | 100.00% |
| Total votes | | 29,464 | 100.00% |
| Republican | Dale Schultz | 38,230 | 100.00% |
| Total votes | | 38,230 | 100.00% |
General election
| Democratic | Ron Kind (incumbent) | 204,856 | 56.43% |
| Republican | Dale Schultz | 157,866 | 43.49% |
| Write-in | | 286 | 0.08% |
| Total votes | | 363,008 | 100.00% |

=== Predictions ===
| Source | Ranking | As of |
|---|---|---|
| The Cook Political Report | Safe D | October 29, 2004 |
| Sabato's Crystal Ball | Safe D | November 1, 2004 |

== District 4 ==
2004 Wisconsin's 4th congressional district election
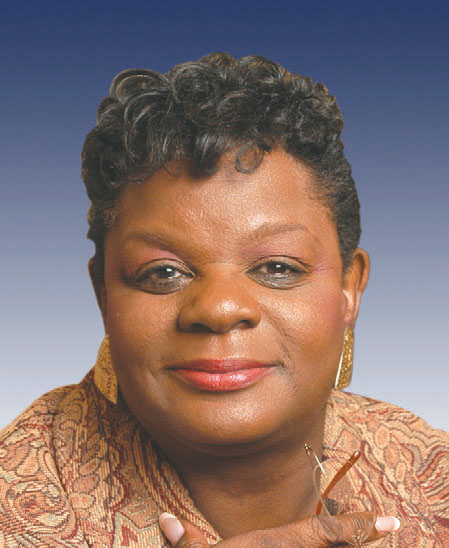

| Nominee | Gwen Moore | Gerald H. Boyle |
| Party | Democratic | Republican |
| Popular vote | 212,382 | 85,928 |
| Percentage | 69.60% | 28.16% |
- Precinct results Moore: 40–50% 50–60% 60–70% 70–80% 80–90% >90% Boyle: 40–50% 50–60% 60–70% 70–80% Tie: 40–50% 50% No votes
U.S. Representative before election
Jerry Kleczka
Democratic
Elected U.S. Representative
Gwen Moore
Democratic

2004 Wisconsin U.S. House 4th district election
Primary election
| Party | Candidate | Votes | % |
|---|---|---|---|
| Democratic | Gwen Moore | 48,858 | 64.26% |
| Democratic | Matt Flynn | 19,377 | 25.48% |
| Democratic | Tim Carpenter | 7,801 | 10.26% |
| Total votes | | 76,036 | 100.00% |
| Republican | Gerald H. Boyle | 11,720 | 52.77% |
| Republican | Corey Hoze | 10,490 | 47.23% |
| Total votes | | 22,210 | 100.00% |
| Constitution | Colin Hudson | 56 | 100.00% |
| Total votes | | 56 | 100.00% |
General election
| Democratic | Gwen Moore | 212,382 | 69.60% |
| Republican | Gerald H. Boyle | 85,928 | 28.16% |
| Independent | Tim Johnson | 3,733 | 1.22% |
| Independent | Robert R. Raymond | 1,861 | 0.61% |
| Constitution | Colin Hudson | 897 | 0.29% |
| Write-in | | 341 | 0.11% |
| Total votes | | 305,142 | 100.00% |

=== Predictions ===
| Source | Ranking | As of |
|---|---|---|
| The Cook Political Report | Safe D | October 29, 2004 |
| Sabato's Crystal Ball | Safe D | November 1, 2004 |

== District 5 ==
2004 Wisconsin's 5th congressional district election
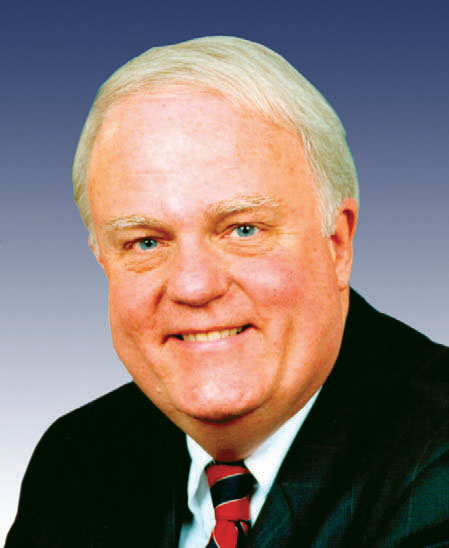

| Nominee | Jim Sensenbrenner | Bryan Kennedy |
| Party | Republican | Democratic |
| Popular vote | 271,153 | 129,384 |
| Percentage | 66.57% | 31.77% |
- Precinct results Sensenbrenner: 40–50% 50–60% 60–70% 70–80% 80–90% >90% Kennedy: 40–50% 50–60% 60–70% 70–80% 80–90% >90% Tie: 40–50% 50% No votes
U.S. Representative before election
Jim Sensenbrenner
Republican
Elected U.S. Representative
Jim Sensenbrenner
Republican

2004 Wisconsin U.S. House 5th district election
Primary election
| Party | Candidate | Votes | % |
|---|---|---|---|
| Republican | Jim Sensenbrenner (incumbent) | 76,179 | 100.00% |
| Total votes | | 76,179 | 100.00% |
| Democratic | Bryan Kennedy | 17,750 | 72.70% |
| Democratic | Gary Kohlenberg | 6,664 | 27.30% |
| Total votes | | 24,414 | 100.00% |
| Libertarian | Tim Peterson | 183 | 100.00% |
| Total votes | | 183 | 100.00% |
General election
| Republican | Jim Sensenbrenner (incumbent) | 271,153 | 66.57% |
| Democratic | Bryan Kennedy | 129,384 | 31.77% |
| Libertarian | Tim Peterson | 6,549 | 1.61% |
| Write-in | | 205 | 0.05% |
| Total votes | | 407,291 | 100.00% |

=== Predictions ===
| Source | Ranking | As of |
|---|---|---|
| The Cook Political Report | Safe R | October 29, 2004 |
| Sabato's Crystal Ball | Safe R | November 1, 2004 |

== District 6 ==
2004 Wisconsin's 6th congressional district election
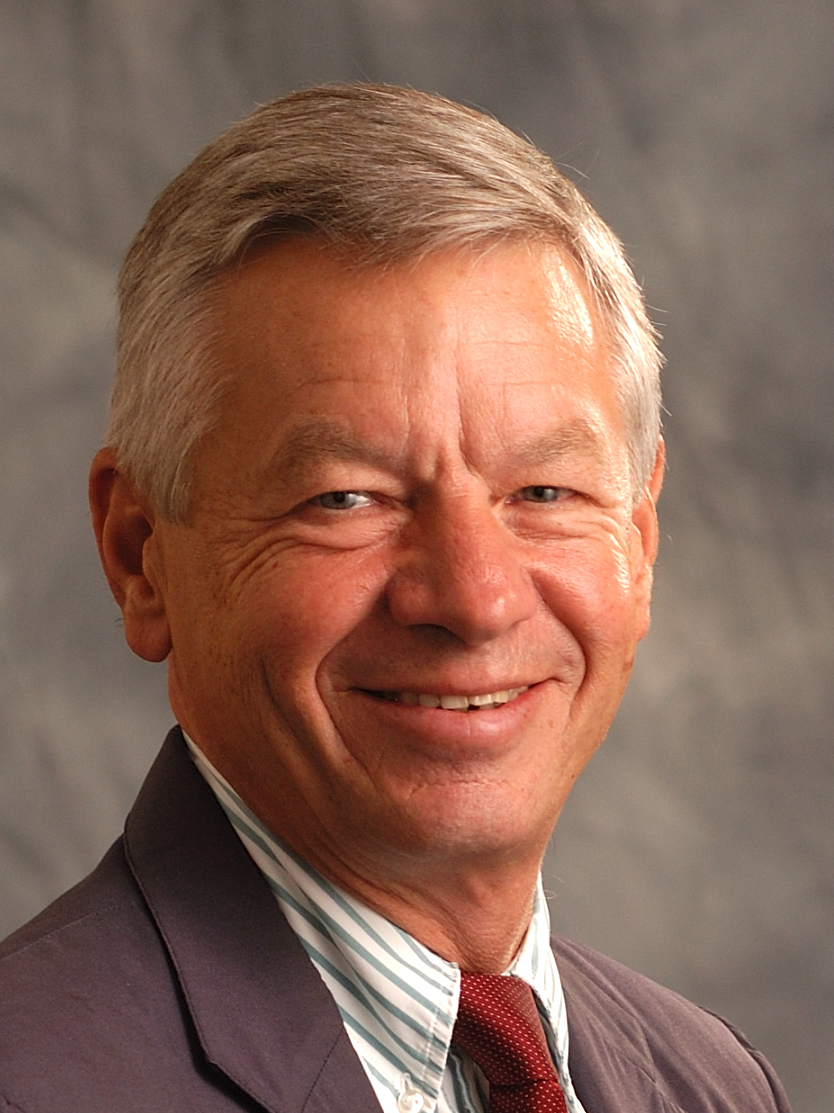

| Nominee | Tom Petri | Jef Hall |
| Party | Republican | Democratic |
| Popular vote | 238,620 | 107,209 |
| Percentage | 67.03% | 30.12% |
- Precinct results Petri: 40–50% 50–60% 60–70% 70–80% 80–90% >90% Hall: 40–50% 50–60% 60–70% 80–90% >90% Tie: 40–50% 50% No votes
U.S. Representative before election
Tom Petri
Republican
Elected U.S. Representative
Tom Petri
Republican

2004 Wisconsin U.S. House 6th district election
Primary election
| Party | Candidate | Votes | % |
|---|---|---|---|
| Republican | Tom Petri (incumbent) | 52,459 | 100.00% |
| Total votes | | 52,459 | 100.00% |
| Democratic | Jef Hall | 13,754 | 100.00% |
| Total votes | | 13,754 | 100.00% |
| Green | Carol Ann Rittenhouse | 220 | 100.00% |
| Total votes | | 220 | 100.00% |
General election
| Republican | Tom Petri (incumbent) | 238,620 | 67.03% |
| Democratic | Jef Hall | 107,209 | 30.12% |
| Green | Carol Ann Rittenhouse | 10,018 | 2.81% |
| Write-in | | 148 | 0.04% |
| Total votes | | 355,995 | 100.00% |

=== Predictions ===
| Source | Ranking | As of |
|---|---|---|
| The Cook Political Report | Safe R | October 29, 2004 |
| Sabato's Crystal Ball | Safe R | November 1, 2004 |

== District 7 ==
2004 Wisconsin's 7th congressional district election
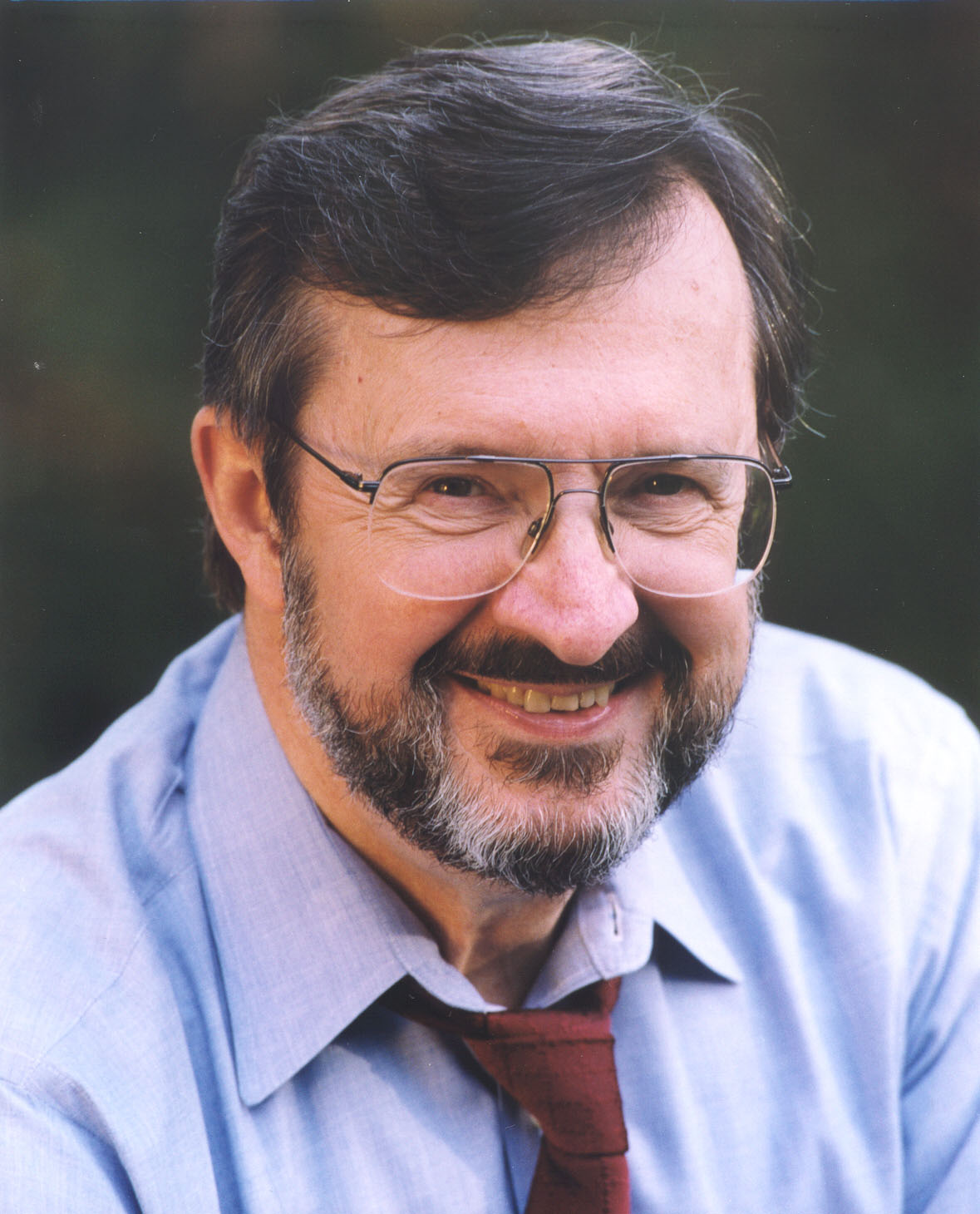

| Nominee | Dave Obey | Mike Miles |
| Party | Democratic | Green |
| Popular vote | 241,306 | 26,518 |
| Percentage | 85.64% | 9.41% |
- Precinct results Obey: 50–60% 60–70% 70–80% 80–90% >90% No votes
U.S. Representative before election
Dave Obey
Democratic
Elected U.S. Representative
Dave Obey
Democratic

2004 Wisconsin U.S. House 7th district election
Primary election
| Party | Candidate | Votes | % |
|---|---|---|---|
| Democratic | Dave Obey (incumbent) | 29,390 | 100.00% |
| Total votes | | 29,390 | 100.00% |
| Green | Mike Miles | 112 | 100.00% |
| Total votes | | 112 | 100.00% |
| Constitution | Larry Oftedahl | 60 | 100.00% |
| Total votes | | 60 | 100.00% |
General election
| Democratic | Dave Obey (incumbent) | 241,306 | 85.64% |
| Green | Mike Miles | 26,518 | 9.41% |
| Constitution | Larry Oftedahl | 12,841 | 4.56% |
| Write-in | | 1,087 | 0.39% |
| Total votes | | 281,752 | 100.00% |

=== Predictions ===
| Source | Ranking | As of |
|---|---|---|
| The Cook Political Report | Safe D | October 29, 2004 |
| Sabato's Crystal Ball | Safe D | November 1, 2004 |

== District 8 ==
2004 Wisconsin's 8th congressional district election
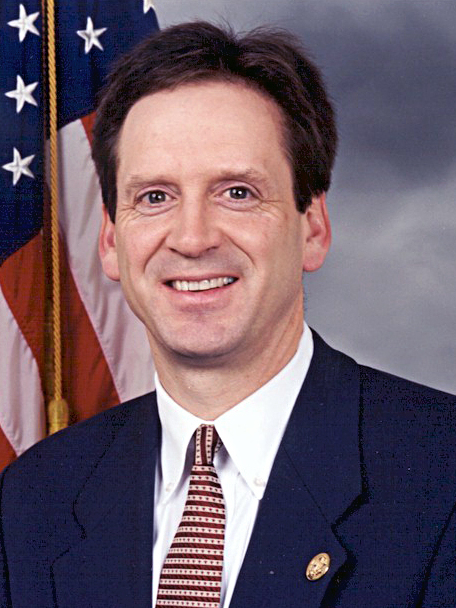

| Nominee | Mark Green | Dottie Le Clair |
| Party | Republican | Democratic |
| Popular vote | 248,070 | 105,513 |
| Percentage | 70.13% | 29.83% |
- Precinct results Green: 40–50% 50–60% 60–70% 70–80% 80–90% >90% Le Clair: 50–60% 60–70% 70–80% 80–90% >90% Tie: 50% No votes
U.S. Representative before election
Mark Green
Republican
Elected U.S. Representative
Mark Green
Republican

2004 Wisconsin U.S. House 7th district election
Primary election
| Party | Candidate | Votes | % |
|---|---|---|---|
| Republican | Mark Green (incumbent) | 52,503 | 100.00% |
| Total votes | | 52,503 | 100.00% |
| Democratic | Dottie Le Clair | 11,479 | 100.00% |
| Total votes | | 11,479 | 100.00% |
General election
| Republican | Mark Green (incumbent) | 248,070 | 70.13% |
| Democratic | Dottie Le Clair | 105,513 | 29.83% |
| Write-in | | 142 | 0.04% |
| Total votes | | 353,725 | 100.00% |

=== Predictions ===
| Source | Ranking | As of |
|---|---|---|
| The Cook Political Report | Safe R | October 29, 2004 |
| Sabato's Crystal Ball | Safe R | November 1, 2004 |

== Works cited ==
=== Books ===
- Barish, Lawrence, ed. (2006). State of Wisconsin 2005-2006 Blue Book. Wisconsin Legislature. ISBN 0975282018.

=== News ===
- Block, Dustin (June 5, 2004). "Ryan / Congressman's third child due soon". Racine Journal Times. p. 3B – via Newspapers.com.
- Potente, Joe (June 5, 2004). "Mukwonago man plans to challenge Paul Ryan". Kenosha News. p. C5 – via Newspapers.com.
- Potente, Joe (June 17, 2004). "Ryan exceeds challengers in fund-raising by $1 million". Kenosha News. p. A1 – via Newspapers.com.
- Shook, Dennis (September 15, 2004). "Kennedy tops Kohlenberg in District 5 runoff". The Waukesha Freeman. p. 3A – via Newspapers.com.
- Tatge-Rozell, Jill (April 2, 2004). "Randall man decides not to seek Congress nomination". Kenosha News. p. C3 – via Newspapers.com.

=== Web ===
- Trandahl, Jeff, ed. (2005). "Statistics of the Presidential and Congressional Election of November 2, 2004". Clerk of the United States House of Representatives. Archived from the original on March 25, 2025.
