= Gibbs Lake (Wisconsin) =

Lake in Wisconsin, United States

- Location within Wisconsin Location within the United States
- Location: Rock County, Wisconsin
- Coordinates: 42.7828°N 89.1804°W
- Surface elevation: 876 feet (267 m)
- Settlements: Janesville

Gibbs Lake is a lake located in Rock County, Wisconsin, United States. The altitude is 876 feet (267 meters).

Gibbs Lake is a fishing, swimming, and picnicking destination. Visitors can gain access to the lake via Gibbs Lake Park. The park is located approximately 12 miles northwest from the center of Janesville.
