= Doug La Follette =

American politician (born 1940)

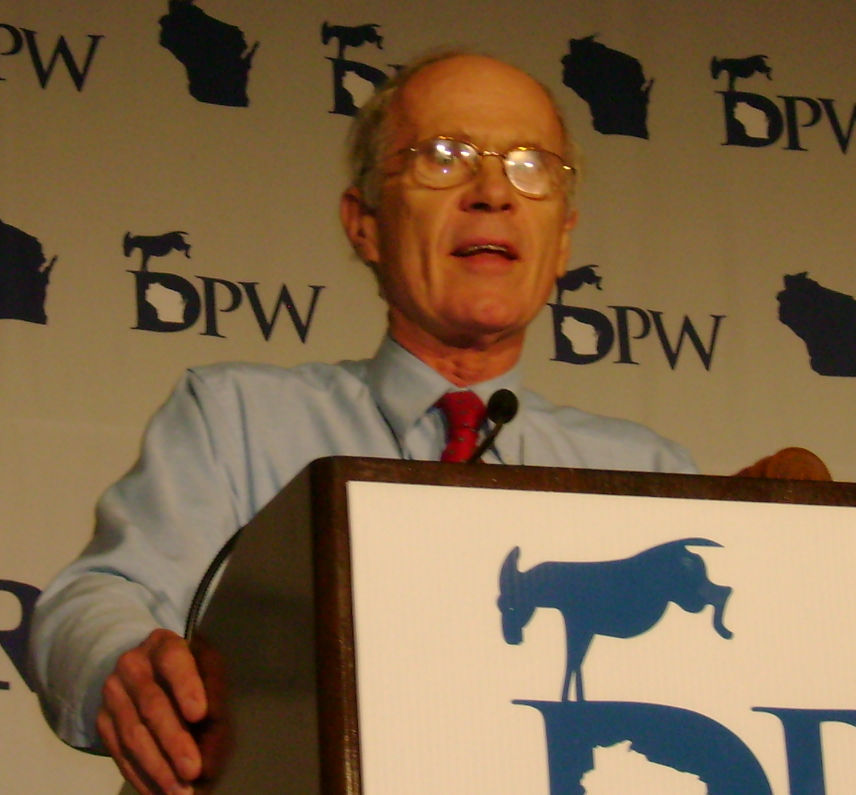

28th & 30th Secretary of State of Wisconsin
- In office January 3, 1983 – March 17, 2023
- Governor: Tony Earl; Tommy Thompson; Scott McCallum; Jim Doyle; Scott Walker; Tony Evers
- Preceded by: Vel Phillips
- Succeeded by: Sarah Godlewski
- In office January 6, 1975 – January 3, 1979
- Governor: Patrick Lucey; Martin J. Schreiber
- Preceded by: Robert C. Zimmerman
- Succeeded by: Vel Phillips

Member of the Wisconsin Senate from the 22nd district
- In office January 1, 1973 – January 6, 1975
- Preceded by: Joseph Lourigan
- Succeeded by: John J. Maurer

Personal details
- Born: June 6, 1940 (age 86) Des Moines, Iowa, U.S.
- Party: Democratic
- Education: Marietta College (BS); Stanford University (MS); Columbia University (PhD)
- Scientific career
- Fields: Organic chemistry
- Institutions: University of Wisconsin–Parkside
- Thesis: Intramolecular Solvation (1967)
- Doctoral advisor: Ronald Breslow

Douglas J. La Follette (born June 6, 1940) is a retired American academic, environmental scientist, and Democratic politician from Wisconsin. He was the 28th and 30th secretary of state of Wisconsin, serving from 1975 to 1979, and from 1983 to 2023. With his 44 years as secretary of state, La Follette is the longest-serving statewide elected official in Wisconsin history, and at the time of his retirement, he was the longest-serving statewide elected official in the United States (excluding U.S. senators). Earlier in his career, he was a member of the Wisconsin Senate, representing Wisconsin's 21st Senate district during the 1973–1975 term. He was also the Democratic Party nominee for lieutenant governor of Wisconsin in 1978, and made unsuccessful bids for U.S. House of Representatives (in 1970 and 1996) and for governor of Wisconsin (in 2012).

== Early life and career ==
A distant relative of the prominent Wisconsin La Follette family, La Follette was born in Des Moines, Iowa. He received his Bachelor of Arts degree from Marietta College, his Master of Science in chemistry from Stanford University, and his Ph.D. in organic chemistry from Columbia University. He began a teaching career as an assistant professor at University of Wisconsin–Parkside in Kenosha. La Follette also served as a research associate at University of Wisconsin–Madison. He also owned a small business.

Known as an environmentalist before running for public office, he was a Wisconsin organizer of the first Earth Day for Gaylord Nelson in 1970 and co-founded Wisconsin's Environmental Decade (now known as Clean Wisconsin) with Peter Anderson.

His great-grandfather has been described as an uncle of Robert "Fighting Bob" La Follette by the Milwaukee Journal Sentinel and Chemical & Engineering News, while Dissent Magazine referred to the great-grandfather as Robert La Follette's brother. WKOW News and WEAU News state that Robert La Follette was Doug's great-uncle. Robert's grandson, former Wisconsin Attorney General Bronson La Follette, has described Doug La Follette as a "second cousin, three times removed" from Robert La Follette. Alternatively, Milwaukee Magazine has noted Doug as a first cousin three times removed of Robert La Follette. According to professor and author Nancy Unger, Doug is a third cousin of Bronson. Doug went on to serve with Bronson from 1975 to 1979 and from 1983 to 1987.

== Political career ==
La Follette first ran for office in the 1970 U.S. House of Representatives election, losing to Les Aspin in the Democratic primary for Wisconsin's 1st congressional district. La Follette served in the Wisconsin State Senate for Kenosha in 1973 and 1974.

La Follette was elected Secretary of State of Wisconsin in 1974. He unsuccessfully ran for Lieutenant Governor of Wisconsin on a ticket with Governor Martin Schreiber in 1978. In 1982, he was again elected secretary of state, defeating incumbent Vel Phillips in the primary.

During his time in office, the Wisconsin legislature repeatedly reduced the office's duties and budget.

In his campaigns for Secretary of State, among other campaigns, La Follette shunned fundraising in the style of former Wisconsin Senator William Proxmire. In 1990, his opponent, Madison attorney and radio personality Stuart Levitan, campaigned on a promise to eliminate the secretary of state's office, whose duties had been reduced and transferred to other agencies (including the State Board of Elections) by the state legislature, under La Follette's tenure. In the Republican wave election year of 1994, despite being outspent more than 2 to 1 by his Republican opponent (both candidates had a low budget), he held him to less than forty percent of the vote.

Since being elected secretary of state, La Follette has run twice for federal office. In 1988, he ran for the U.S. Senate, losing the primary to Herb Kohl. In 1996, he made another bid for the U.S. House of Representatives, losing in the Democratic primary for Wisconsin's 1st congressional district to Lydia Spottswood, who went on to lose the general election to Mark Neumann.

In 2012, La Follette ran in the Democratic primary in the special election to recall Scott Walker.

In 2023, three months into his eleventh term, La Follette resigned as secretary of state. Governor Tony Evers appointed former State Treasurer Sarah Godlewski to the position. In his resignation letter, he stated that he didn't want to "spend the next three and a half years trying to run an office without adequate resources and staffing levels." At the time of his retirement, La Follette was the longest serving non-federal statewide elected official in the United States holding the same office, having served from January 3, 1983 to March 17, 2023.

== Other roles ==
- La Follette is the author of the 1991 book The Survival Handbook: A Strategy for Saving Planet Earth.
- He has also served on the board of directors of Friends of the Earth and the Union of Concerned Scientists.
- In 2003 he ran for, and was elected to, the board of directors of the Sierra Club for a three-year term. He did not seek reelection in 2006.
- He was a Fulbright Distinguished American Scholar in 2003.

== Electoral history ==
=== U.S. House (1970) ===
Year	Election	Date	Elected				Defeated				Total	Plurality
1970	Primary	Sep. 8	Les Aspin	Democratic	15,185	39.83%	Doug La Follette	Dem.	15,165	39.78%	38,124	20
1970	Primary	Sep. 8	Les Aspin	Democratic	15,185	39.83%	Gerald T. Flynn	Dem.	6,130	16.08%	38,124	20
1970	Primary	Sep. 8	Les Aspin	Democratic	15,185	39.83%	Perry J. Anderson	Dem.	1,644	4.31%	38,124	20

=== Wisconsin Senate (1972) ===
Wisconsin Senate, 22nd District Election, 1972
Party	Candidate	Votes	%	±%
Democratic Primary, September 12, 1972
Democratic	Doug La Follette	4,654	32.11%	
Democratic	John J. Maurer	3,332	22.99%	
Democratic	Edwin Anderson	2,582	17.81%	
Democratic	Ronald F. Lourigan	2,478	17.10%	
Democratic	Richard Lindgren	1,448	9.99%	
Plurality		1,322	9.12%	
Total votes		14,494	100.0%	
General Election, November 7, 1972
Democratic	Doug La Follette	25,522	53.98%	−1.90%
Republican	George W. Anderson	21,161	44.75%	+0.63%
American	Chester Hensley	601	1.27%	
Plurality		4,361	9.22%	-2.54%
Total votes		47,284	100.0%	+15.44%
Democratic hold				

=== Wisconsin Secretary of State (1974) ===
Wisconsin Secretary of State Election, 1974
Party	Candidate	Votes	%	±%
Democratic Primary, September 10, 1974
Democratic	Doug La Follette	237,077	75.39%	
Democratic	Eugene Parks	77,409	24.61%	
Total votes		314,486	100.0%	
General Election, November 5, 1974
Democratic	Doug La Follette	697,528	59.87%	+22.45%
Republican	Kent C. Jones	406,602	34.90%	−26.81%
American	Eugene R. Zimmerman	60,962	5.23%	+4.36%
Plurality		290,926	24.97%	+0.69%
Total votes		1,165,092	100.0%	-10.58%
Democratic gain from Republican				

=== Wisconsin Lieutenant Governor (1978) ===
Wisconsin Gubernatorial Election, 1978
Party	Candidate	Votes	%	±%
Democratic Lieutenant Governor Primary, September 12, 1978
Democratic	Doug La Follette	151,366	44.78%	
Democratic	Dale McKenna	47,257	13.98%	
Democratic	Harout O. Sanasarian	40,268	11.91%	
Democratic	Paul Offner	40,008	11.84%	
Democratic	Robert A. Anderson	21,230	6.28%	
Democratic	Charles F. Smith Jr.	19,504	5.77%	
Democratic	Monroe Swan	18,392	5.44%	
Total votes		338,025	100.0%	
General Election, November 7, 1978
Republican	Lee S. Dreyfus / Russell Olson	816,056	54.37%	+12.30%
Democratic	Martin J. Schreiber (incumbent) / Doug La Follette	673,813	44.89%	−8.30%
Constitution	Eugene R. Zimmerman / George Reed	6,355	0.42%	+0.12%
Independent	George C. Doherty / Marion A. Doherty	2,183	0.15%	
Independent	Adrienne Kaplan / William Breihan	1,548	0.10%	
Independent	Henry A. Ochsner / Robert E. Nordlander	849	0.06%	
	Scattering	192	0.01%	
Plurality		142,243	9.48%	-1.65%
Total votes		1,500,996	100.0%	+27.00%
Republican gain from Democratic				

=== Wisconsin Secretary of State (1982–2022) ===
Year	Election	Date	Elected				Defeated				Total	Plurality
1982	Primary	Sep. 14	Doug La Follette	Democratic	275,729	51.13%	Ada Deer	Dem.	166,371	30.85%	539,227	109,358
1982	Primary	Sep. 14	Doug La Follette	Democratic	275,729	51.13%	Vel Phillips (inc)	Dem.	66,576	12.35%	539,227	109,358
1982	Primary	Sep. 14	Doug La Follette	Democratic	275,729	51.13%	Lewis T. Mittness	Dem.	30,551	5.67%	539,227	109,358
1982	General	Nov. 2	Doug La Follette	Democratic	984,835	65.57%	Frederick H. Rice	Rep.	496,024	33.03%	1,501,899	488,811
1982	General	Nov. 2	Doug La Follette	Democratic	984,835	65.57%	Leslie G. Key	Lib.	13,481	0.90%	1,501,899	488,811
1982	General	Nov. 2	Doug La Follette	Democratic	984,835	65.57%	Leslie G. Key	Con.	7,559	0.50%	1,501,899	488,811
1986	General	Nov. 4	Doug La Follette (inc)	Democratic	754,032	52.07%	Clifford Krueger	Rep.	670,672	46.31%	1,448,189	83,360
1986	General	Nov. 4	Doug La Follette (inc)	Democratic	754,032	52.07%	Richard L. Ackley	L-F	23,485	1.62%	1,448,189	83,360
1990	Primary	Sep. 11	Doug La Follette (inc)	Democratic	129,926	72.38%	Stuart Levitan	Dem.	49,590	27.62%	179,516	80,336
1990	General	Nov. 6	Doug La Follette (inc)	Democratic	733,390	55.67%	Robert M. Thompson	Rep.	583,955	44.33%	1,317,345	149,435
1994	General	Nov. 8	Doug La Follette (inc)	Democratic	845,742	57.03%	Erling G. Jackson	Rep.	590,666	39.83%	1,482,943	255,076
1994	General	Nov. 8	Doug La Follette (inc)	Democratic	845,742	57.03%	Kevin Scheunemann	Lib.	26,397	1.78%	1,482,943	255,076
1994	General	Nov. 8	Doug La Follette (inc)	Democratic	845,742	57.03%	Ernest Brusubardis III	Tax.	20,138	1.36%	1,482,943	255,076
1998	General	Nov. 3	Doug La Follette (inc)	Democratic	973,744	57.98%	Linda A. Cross	Rep.	660,406	39.32%	1,679,484	313,338
1998	General	Nov. 3	Doug La Follette (inc)	Democratic	973,744	57.98%	Donald L. Carlson	Lib.	18,074	1.08%	1,679,484	313,338
1998	General	Nov. 3	Doug La Follette (inc)	Democratic	973,744	57.98%	William C. Hemenway	Tax.	17,354	1.03%	1,679,484	313,338
1998	General	Nov. 3	Doug La Follette (inc)	Democratic	973,744	57.98%	Leroy Mueller	Ref.	9,906	0.59%	1,679,484	313,338
2002	General	Nov. 5	Doug La Follette (inc)	Democratic	950,929	56.60%	Robert Gerald Lorge	Rep.	693,476	41.27%	1,680,164	257,453
2002	General	Nov. 5	Doug La Follette (inc)	Democratic	950,929	56.60%	Edward J. Frami	Con.	34,750	2.07%	1,680,164	257,453
2006	Primary	Sep. 12	Doug La Follette (inc)	Democratic	236,547	71.19%	Scot Ross	Dem.	95,354	28.70%	332,265	141,193
2006	General	Nov. 7	Doug La Follette (inc)	Democratic	1,184,720	58.07%	Sandy Sullivan	Rep.	796,686	39.05%	2,040,144	388,034
2006	General	Nov. 7	Doug La Follette (inc)	Democratic	1,184,720	58.07%	Michael LaForest	Grn.	57,326	2.81%	2,040,144	388,034
2010	General	Nov. 2	Doug La Follette (inc)	Democratic	1,074,118	51.61%	David D. King	Rep.	1,005,217	48.30%	2,081,198	68,901
2014	General	Nov. 4	Doug La Follette (inc)	Democratic	1,161,113	50.00%	Julian Bradley	Rep.	1,074,835	46.29%	2,322,035	86,278
2014	General	Nov. 4	Doug La Follette (inc)	Democratic	1,161,113	50.00%	Andy Craig	Ind.	58,996	2.54%	2,322,035	86,278
2014	General	Nov. 4	Doug La Follette (inc)	Democratic	1,161,113	50.00%	Jerry Broitzman	Con.	25,744	1.11%	2,322,035	86,278
2018	Primary	Aug. 14	Doug La Follette (inc)	Democratic	327,020	65.84%	Arvina Martin	Dem.	169,130	34.05%	496,720	157,890
2018	General	Nov. 6	Doug La Follette (inc)	Democratic	1,380,752	52.74%	Jay Schroeder	Rep.	1,235,034	47.18%	2,617,948	145,718
2018	General	Nov. 6	Doug La Follette (inc)	Democratic	1,380,752	52.74%	Brad Karas (write-in)	Grn.	60	0.00%	2,617,948	145,718
2022	Primary	Aug. 9	Doug La Follette (inc)	Democratic	300,773	63.57%	Alexia Sabor	Dem.	171,954	36.34%	473,144	128,819
2022	General	Nov. 8	Doug La Follette (inc)	Democratic	1,268,748	48.30%	Amy Loudenbeck	Rep.	1,261,306	48.01%	2,626,943	7,442
2022	General	Nov. 8	Doug La Follette (inc)	Democratic	1,268,748	48.30%	Neil Harmon	Lib.	54,413	2.07%	2,626,943	7,442
2022	General	Nov. 8	Doug La Follette (inc)	Democratic	1,268,748	48.30%	Sharyl R. McFarland	Grn.	41,532	1.58%	2,626,943	7,442

=== U.S. Senate (1988) ===
Year	Election	Date	Elected				Defeated				Total	Plurality
1988	Primary	Sep. 13	Herb Kohl	Democratic	249,226	46.78%	Tony Earl	Dem.	203,479	38.19%	533,004	45,747
1988	Primary	Sep. 13	Herb Kohl	Democratic	249,226	46.78%	Ed Garvey	Dem.	55,225	10.37%	533,004	45,747
1988	Primary	Sep. 13	Herb Kohl	Democratic	249,226	46.78%	Doug La Follette	Dem.	19,819	3.72%	533,004	45,747
1988	Primary	Sep. 13	Herb Kohl	Democratic	249,226	46.78%	Edmund Hou-Seye	Dem.	5,040	0.95%	533,004	45,747

=== U.S. House (1996) ===
Wisconsin's 1st Congressional District Election, 1996
Party	Candidate	Votes	%
Democratic Primary, September 10, 1996
Democratic	Lydia Spottswood	16,945	45.68%
Democratic	Doug La Follette	13,594	36.64%
Democratic	Jeffrey C. Thomas	4,691	12.65%
Democratic	Jerry Maiers	1,867	5.03%
Plurality		3,351	9.03%
Total votes		37,097	100.0%

=== Wisconsin Governor (2012) ===
Year	Election	Date	Elected				Defeated				Total	Plurality
2012	Recall Primary	May 8	Tom Barrett	Democratic	390,191	58.10%	Kathleen Falk	Dem.	229,236	34.13%	671,602	160,955
2012	Recall Primary	May 8	Tom Barrett	Democratic	390,191	58.10%	Kathleen Vinehout	Dem.	26,967	4.02%	671,602	160,955
2012	Recall Primary	May 8	Tom Barrett	Democratic	390,191	58.10%	Douglas La Follette	Dem.	19,497	2.90%	671,602	160,955
2012	Recall Primary	May 8	Tom Barrett	Democratic	390,191	58.10%	Gladys Huber	Dem.	4,847	0.72%	671,602	160,955
2012	Recall Primary	May 8	Tom Barrett	Democratic	390,191	58.10%	Scattering	Dem.	864	0.13%	671,602	160,955

Party political offices
Preceded by Robert Zimmermann	Democratic nominee for Secretary of State of Wisconsin; 1974	Succeeded by Vel Phillips
Preceded by Martin J. Schreiber	Democratic nominee for Lieutenant Governor of Wisconsin; 1978	Succeeded by James Flynn
Preceded by Vel Phillips	Democratic nominee for Secretary of State of Wisconsin; 1982, 1986, 1990, 1994, 1998, 2002, 2006, 2010, 2014, 2018, 2022	Succeeded by JoCasta Zamarripa
Wisconsin Senate
Preceded by Joseph Lourigan	Member of the Wisconsin Senate from the 22nd district 1973–1975	Succeeded by John J. Maurer
Political offices
Preceded by Robert Zimmerman	Secretary of State of Wisconsin; 1975–1979	Succeeded by Vel Phillips
Preceded by Vel Phillips	Secretary of State of Wisconsin; 1983–2023	Succeeded by Sarah Godlewski
