= 2012 United States Senate election in Wisconsin =

- November 6, 2012
- Turnout: 72.5% (voting eligible)
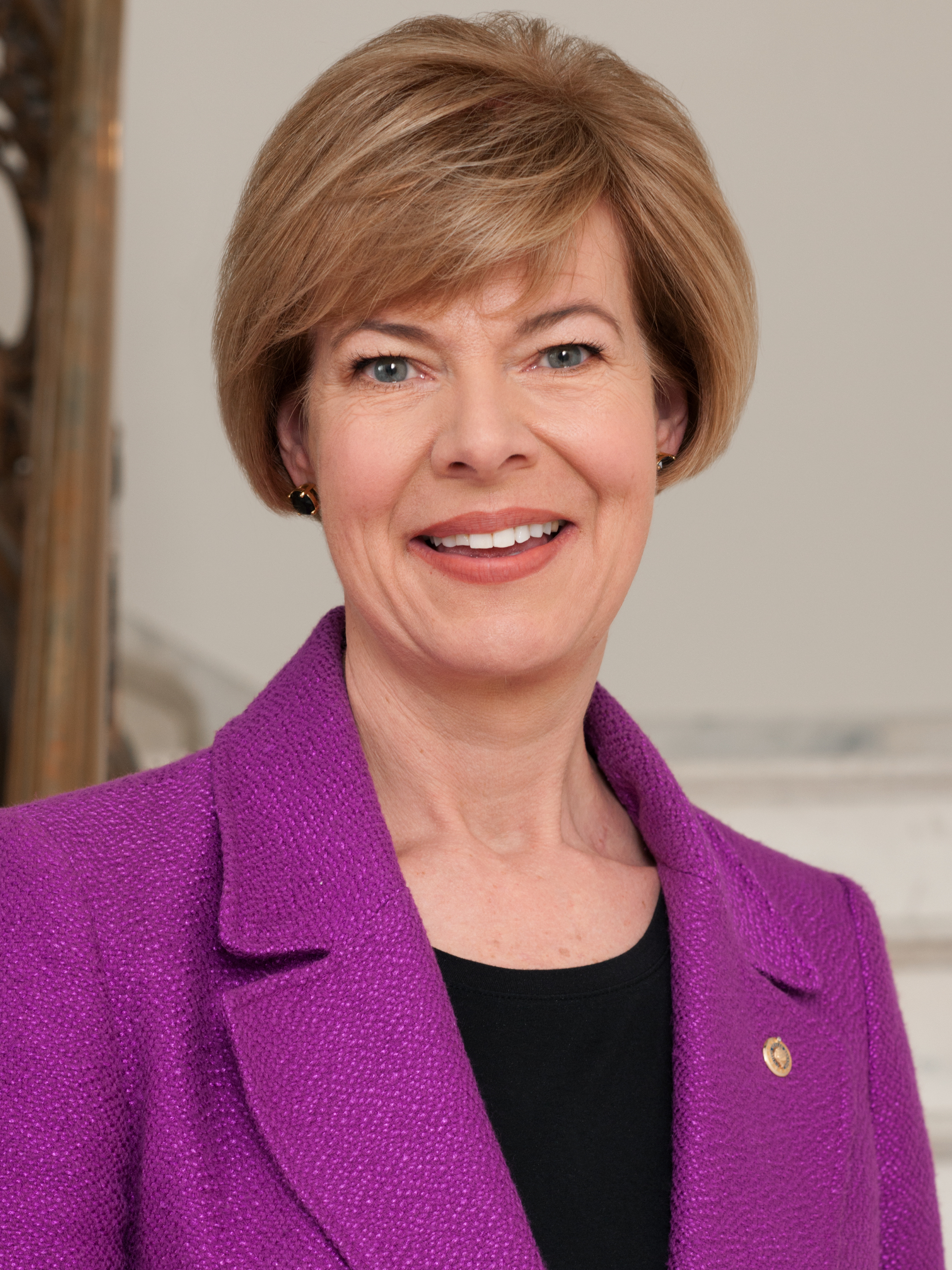

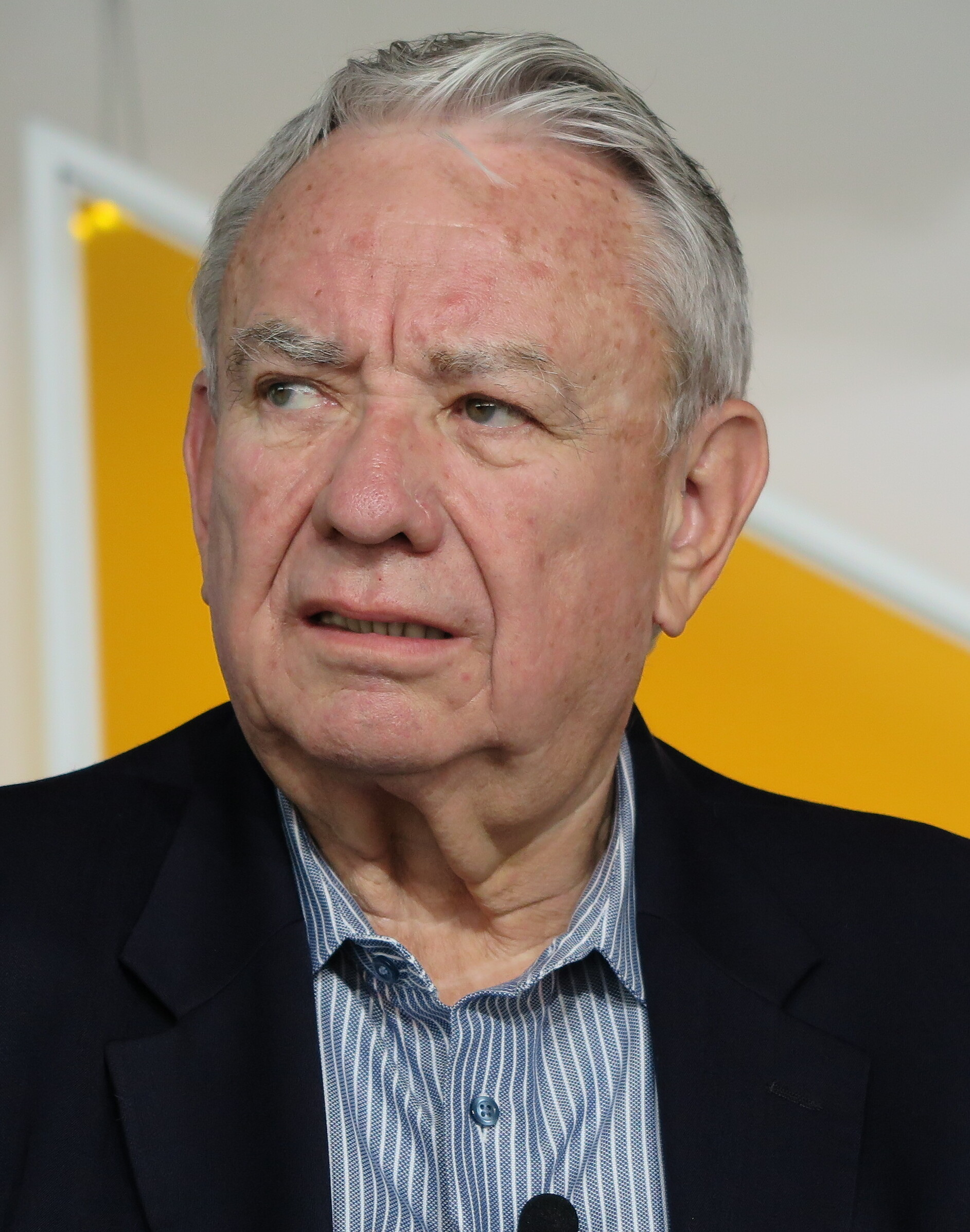
Nominee	Tammy Baldwin	Tommy Thompson
Party	Democratic	Republican
Popular vote	1,547,104	1,380,126
Percentage	51.41%	45.86%
- Baldwin: 40–50% 50–60% 60–70% 70–80% 80–90% >90% Thompson: 40–50% 50–60% 60–70% 70–80% 80–90% >90% Tie No data
U.S. senator before election
Herb Kohl
Democratic
Elected U.S. Senator
Tammy Baldwin
Democratic

The 2012 United States Senate election in Wisconsin took place on November 6, 2012, alongside a U.S. presidential election as well as other elections to the United States Senate and House of Representatives and various state and local elections. Incumbent Democratic Senator Herb Kohl retired instead of running for re-election to a fifth term. This was the first open Senate seat in Wisconsin since 1988, when Kohl won his first term.

Primary elections were held on August 14, 2012. Congresswoman Tammy Baldwin of Wisconsin's 2nd congressional district ran unopposed in the Democratic primary. The Republican nominee was former Wisconsin Governor and U.S. Secretary of Health and Human Services Tommy Thompson, who won with a plurality in a four-way primary race. In the general election, Baldwin defeated Thompson and won the open seat. She became the first woman elected to represent Wisconsin in the Senate and the first openly gay U.S. senator in history. This is also the only time Thompson lost a statewide race. Baldwin and Thompson each won half of the counties in the state, an unusual result.

== Background ==
Incumbent Democratic Senator Herb Kohl was re-elected to a fourth term in 2006, beating Republican attorney Robert Lorge by 67% to 30%. Kohl's lack of fundraising suggested his potential retirement. There was speculation that Kohl might decide to retire to allow Russ Feingold, who lost his re-election bid in 2010, to run again, although Mike Tate, chairman of the Wisconsin Democratic Party, dismissed speculation about Kohl's potential retirement. Kohl announced in May 2011 that he would not run for re-election in 2012.

== Democratic primary ==
Despite speculation that Kohl would retire to make way for his former Senate colleague Russ Feingold, who had been unseated in 2010, Feingold chose not to enter the race. Other potential candidates also declined to run, leaving Baldwin unopposed in the Democratic primary.

=== Candidates ===
==== Declared ====
- Tammy Baldwin, U.S. representative

==== Declined ====
- Tom Barrett, mayor of Milwaukee
- Kathleen Falk, former Dane County executive (1997–2011)
- Russ Feingold, former U.S. senator
- Steve Kagen, former U.S. representative for Wisconsin's 8th congressional district (2006–2011)
- Ron Kind, U.S. representative for Wisconsin's 3rd congressional district
- Herb Kohl, incumbent U.S. senator
- Gwen Moore, U.S. representative for Wisconsin's 4th congressional district
- Tim Sullivan, businessman

=== Polling ===
Hypothetical polling

Poll source	Date(s) administered	Sample size	Margin of error	Tammy Baldwin	Jon Erpenbach	Russ Feingold	Kathleen Falk	Steve Kagen	Ron Kind	Barbara Lawton	Gwen Moore	Other/ Undecided
Public Policy Polling	May 19–22, 2011	783	±3.5%	12%	5%	70%	1%	3%	4%	1%	2%	3%
Public Policy Polling	May 19–22, 2011	783	±3.5%	30%	13%	—	4%	17%	16%	3%	6%	12%
Magellan Strategies	July 12–13, 2011	627	±3.9%	46%	—	—	—	21%	—	—	—	33%
Magellan Strategies	July 12–13, 2011	627	±3.9%	41%	—	—	—	—	19%	—	—	40%
Public Policy Polling	August 12–14, 2011	387	±5%	48%	—	—	—	19%	—	—	—	33%
Public Policy Polling	August 12–14, 2011	387	±5%	37%	—	—	—	15%	21%	—	—	27%

=== Results ===
Democratic primary results
Party	Candidate	Votes	%
Democratic	Tammy Baldwin	185,265	99.77
Democratic	Write ins	424	0.23
Total votes		185,689	100

== Republican primary ==
Congressman and House Budget Committee Chairman Paul Ryan stated he would not run if Kohl sought reelection, but would contemplate a run if Kohl retired. Ryan later stated that he was "95 percent sure" that he would not run. He was later chosen as the Republican nominee for vice president by presidential nominee Mitt Romney.

Six candidates declared for the seat, although two later withdrew. The contest turned out to be a four-way fight. Although a large majority of Republican primary voters consistently expressed a preference for a nominee "more conservative" than Tommy Thompson, Eric Hovde and Mark Neumann split the conservative vote, allowing Thompson to narrowly prevail with a plurality of the vote.

=== Candidates ===
==== Declared ====
- Jeff Fitzgerald, speaker of the Wisconsin State Assembly
- Eric Hovde, businessman
- Mark Neumann, former U.S. representative, nominee for the U.S. Senate in 1998, and candidate for governor in 2010
- Tommy Thompson, former governor of Wisconsin and former secretary of Health and Human Services

==== Withdrew ====
- Frank Lasee, state senator (endorsed Eric Hovde)
- Kip Smith, physical therapist

==== Declined ====
- Mark Andrew Green, former U.S. representative and former United States ambassador to Tanzania
- Theodore Kanavas, former state senator
- Paul Ryan, U.S. representative
- Tim Sullivan, businessman
- J. B. Van Hollen, Wisconsin attorney general

=== Polling ===
Poll source	Date(s) administered	Sample size	Margin of error	Jeff Fitzgerald	Eric Hovde	Mark Neumann	Tommy Thompson	Undecided
Public Policy Polling	August 8–9, 2012	557	± 4.2%	15%	27%	24%	25%	9%
Marquette University	August 2–5, 2012	519	± 4.4%	13%	20%	18%	28%	7%
We Ask America	July 31, 2012	1,237	± 2.8%	12%	23%	17%	23%	25%
Public Policy Polling	July 30–31, 2012	400	± 4.9%	13%	28%	25%	25%	9%
Public Policy Polling	July 30–31, 2012	400	± 4.9%	—	33%	27%	30%	10%
Marquette University	July 5–8, 2012	432	± 4.8%	6%	23%	10%	35%	25%
Public Policy Polling	July 5–8, 2012	564	± 4.1%	9%	31%	15%	29%	16%
OnMessage Inc.^{+}	June 26–27, 2012	600	± 4.0%	7%	29%	16%	34%	14%
Marquette University	June 13–16, 2012	344	± 5.4%	10%	14%	16%	34%	25%
Public Policy Polling	March 31–April 1, 2012	609	± 4.0%	18%	—	25%	38%	19%
Public Policy Polling	February 23–26, 2012	556	± 4.2%	22%	—	22%	39%	17%
Public Policy Polling	February 23–26, 2012	556	± 4.2%	32%	—	42%	—	26%
Public Policy Polling	February 23–26, 2012	556	± 4.2%	37%	—	—	46%	17%
Public Policy Polling	February 23–26, 2012	556	± 4.2%	—	—	36%	46%	18%
Public Policy Polling	October 20–23, 2011	650	± 3.8%	21%	—	29%	35%	11%
Public Policy Polling	October 20–23, 2011	650	± 3.8%	—	—	39%	43%	17%
Public Policy Polling	October 20–23, 2011	650	± 3.8%	28%	—	44%	—	28%
Public Policy Polling	October 20–23, 2011	650	± 3.8%	35%	—	—	47%	17%
Public Policy Polling	August 12–14, 2011	362	± 5.2%	—	—	39%	47%	13%
Magellan Strategies	July 12–13, 2011	638	± 3.9%	15%	—	26%	41%	18%
Magellan Strategies	July 12–13, 2011	638	± 3.9%	—	—	36%	44%	20%

- ^{+} Commissioned by Eric Hovde

Poll source	Date(s) administered	Sample size	Margin of error	Tommy Thompson	Someone more conservative	Undecided
Public Policy Polling	July 30–31, 2012	400	± 4.9%	29%	58%	13%
Public Policy Polling	July 5–8, 2012	564	± 4.1%	34%	50%	17%
Public Policy Polling	February 23–26, 2012	556	± 4.2%	37%	47%	17%
Public Policy Polling	October 20–23, 2011	650	± 3.8%	35%	51%	14%

=== Endorsements ===
Jeff Fitzgerald

Individuals

- Joan Ballweg, Wisconsin Assembly caucus chair (Markesan)
- Paul Farrow, Wisconsin state representative (Pewaukee)
- Samantha Kerkman, Wisconsin Assembly caucus sergeant at arms (Randall)
- Joel Kleefisch, Wisconsin state representative (Oconomowoc)
- Dan Knodl, Wisconsin Assembly assistant majority leader (Germantown)
- Dale Kooyenga, Wisconsin state representative (Brookfield)
- Bill Kramer, Wisconsin Assembly speaker pro-tem (Waukesha)
- Mike Kuglitsch, Wisconsin state representative (New Berlin)
- Jim Ott, Wisconsin state representative (Brown Deer)
- Don Pridemore, Wisconsin state representative (Hartford)
- Scott Suder, Wisconsin Assembly majority leader (Abbotsford)
- Robin Vos, Wisconsin Assembly finance chair (Rochester)
- Mary Williams, Wisconsin Assembly caucus secretary (Medford)
Eric Hovde

Individuals

- Frank Lasee, Wisconsin state senator (De Pere)
- Leah Vukmir, Wisconsin state senator (Wauwatosa)
- FreedomWorks
Mark Neumann

Individuals

- Tom Coburn, U.S. senator (OK)
- Jim DeMint, U.S. senator (SC)
- Mike Lee, U.S. senator (UT)
- Mark Levin, nationally syndicated talk show host
- Rand Paul, U.S. senator (KY)
- Kurt W. Schuller, Wisconsin state treasurer
- Pat Toomey, U.S. senator (PA)
- Jack Voight, former Wisconsin state treasurer

Organizations

- Club for Growth
- Family Research Council
- GING PAC, a PAC of Social Conservatives
- Wisconsin Right to Life
Tommy Thompson

Politicians

- Lamar Alexander, U.S. senator from Tennessee
- Jeb Bush, former Florida governor
- Herman Cain, business executive, radio host, syndicated columnist, candidate for the 2012 U.S. Republican Party presidential nomination
- Mitch Daniels, governor of Indiana
- John Engler, former governor of Michigan
- Margaret Farrow, former lieutenant governor of Wisconsin
- Newt Gingrich, former speaker of the House of Representatives, and 2012 presidential candidate
- Rudy Giuliani, former mayor of New York City and 2008 presidential candidate
- Bill Graves, former governor of Kansas
- Mark Green, former U.S. representative and former United States Ambassador to Tanzania
- John Hoeven, U.S. senator from North Dakota
- Mike Huckabee, former governor of Arkansas, 2008 presidential candidate and Fox News talk show host
- Mike Johanns, U.S. senator from Nebraska
- Frank Keating, former governor of Oklahoma
- Dirk Kempthorne, former governor of Idaho and former secretary of the interior
- Scott Klug, former U.S. representative (WI)
- Mike Leavitt, former governor of Utah, former administrator of the EPA, and former secretary of Health and Human Services
- Tom Ridge, former governor of Pennsylvania and former secretary of Homeland Security
- Jim Risch, U.S. senator from Idaho
- J.B. Van Hollen, Wisconsin attorney general
- Bill Weld, former governor of Massachusetts
- Cathy Zeuske, former Wisconsin state treasurer

Celebrities and political commentators

- Dick Morris, political strategist, author, Fox News analyst, former adviser to President Bill Clinton
- Ted Nugent, musician and conservative activist
- Michael Reagan, author, radio host, and son of President Ronald Reagan
- Joe Wurzelbacher, a.k.a. Joe the Plumber

Cabinet officials

- Ray Boland, colonel and former veterans sffairs secretary
- Donald L. Nelson, former deputy assistant secretary of defense
- Donald Rumsfeld, former secretary of defense from 1975 to 1977 and 2001 to 2006, former White House chief of staff, and former ambassador

State legislators

- John Gard, former Wisconsin Assembly speaker
- Rob Cowles, state senator
- Mike Ellis, state senator
- Evan Wynn, state representative (Whitewater)
- Joseph Knilans, state representative (Janesville)
- Sheila Harsdorf, state senator
- Luther Olsen, state senator
- Dale Schultz, state senator
- Jerry Petrowski, state senator
- Van Wanggaard, former state senator

Political organization officials

- Mary Buestrin, Republican National Convention co-chairman
- Rick Graber, former Republican Party of Wisconsin chairman
- David Keene, president of the National Rifle Association of America and former chairman of the American Conservative Union
- Terry and Mary Kohler, Wisconsin Club for Growth founders
- Sue Lynch, former Wisconsin Federation of Republican Women president
- Ginny Marschman, former Wisconsin Federation of Republican Women president

Law enforcement officials

- Daniel Trawicki, Waukesha County sheriff
- Brad Schimel, Waukesha County district attorney

Organizations

- Chiropractic Society of Wisconsin
- Dairy Business Association
- GOProud
- Milwaukee Police Association
- Milwaukee Police Supervisors Organization
- Milwaukee Professional Firefighters Association
- Wisconsin Corn Growers Association
- Wisconsin Farm Bureau Federation
- Wisconsin Grocers Association
- Wisconsin Health Care Association
- Wisconsin Mortgage Bankers Association
- Wisconsin Restaurant Association
- Wisconsin Right to Life

=== Results ===
Results by county Thompson: 20–30%; 30–40%; 40–50%; 50–60%; 60–70%; Hovde: 30–40%; 40–50%; Neumann: 30–40%; 40–50%

Republican primary results
Party	Candidate	Votes	%
Republican	Tommy Thompson	197,928	34.0
Republican	Eric Hovde	179,557	30.8
Republican	Mark Neumann	132,786	22.8
Republican	Jeff Fitzgerald	71,871	12.3
Republican	Write ins	244	0.04
Total votes		582,630	100

== General election ==
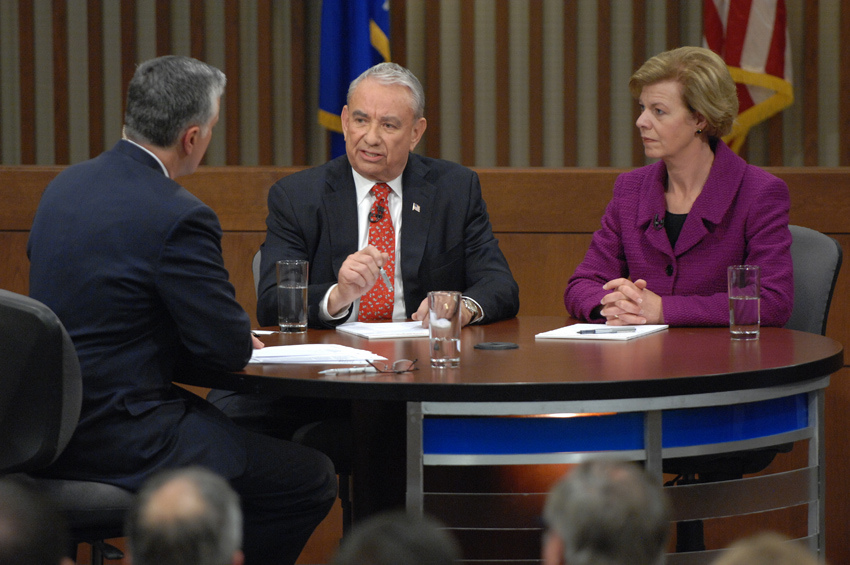
Thompson and Baldwin with WISN-TV's Mike Gousha at the October 26 debate

=== Candidates ===
- Nimrod Allen III (independent), consultant and former Marine
- Tammy Baldwin (Democratic), U.S. representative
- Joseph Kexel (Libertarian), IT consultant
- Tommy Thompson (Republican), former governor and former secretary of Health and Human Services

=== Debates ===
Baldwin and Thompson agreed to three debates: September 28, October 18 and 26, all broadcast statewide, and nationwide through C-SPAN.

The first debate originated from the studios of Milwaukee Public Television and was coordinated by the Wisconsin Broadcasters Association. It aired on MPTV, Wisconsin Public Television, Wisconsin Public Radio and several commercial stations throughout the state.

The second debate originated from the Theater for Civic Engagement on the campus of the University of Wisconsin–Marathon County in Wausau and was coordinated by WPT/WPR, the Milwaukee Journal Sentinel and Milwaukee's WTMJ-TV. Again it was carried on MPTV, WPT/WPR, and several commercial stations, including WTMJ-TV.

The third debate originated from Eckstein Hall on the campus of Marquette University Law School and was coordinated by WISN-TV in Milwaukee. It aired on that station and across the state's other ABC affiliated stations.

External links

- Complete video of debate, September 28, 2012 - C-SPAN
- Complete video of debate, October 18, 2012 - C-SPAN
- Complete video of debate, October 26, 2012 - C-SPAN

=== Fundraising ===
Candidate (party)	Receipts	Disbursements	Cash on hand	Debt
Tammy Baldwin (D)	$14,643,869	$15,204,940	$143,852	$0
Tommy Thompson (R)	$9,585,823	$9,582,888	$2,934	$0
Source: Federal Election Commission

==== Top contributors ====
Tammy Baldwin	Contribution	Tommy Thompson	Contribution
EMILY's List	$431,843	Michael Best & Friedrich LLP	$36,825
MoveOn.org	$171,467	ABC Supply	$28,500
University of Wisconsin	$117,600	Akin Gump Strauss Hauer & Feld	$28,250
J Street PAC	$113,758	Direct Supply	$27,500
League of Conservation Voters	$95,308	Wisconsin Energy Corporation	$25,750
Democracy Engine	$81,330	American Foods Group	$25,000
Council for a Livable World	$54,130	Gilead Sciences	$23,000
Voices for Progress	$25,749	Centene Corporation	$20,750
Marshfield Clinic	$21,800	BGR Group	$20,500
Microsoft Corporation	$18,564	C. R. Bard, Inc.	$20,000
Source: OpenSecrets

==== Top industries ====
Tammy Baldwin	Contribution	Tommy Thompson	Contribution
Women's issues	$915,482	Retired	$858,276
Retired	$791,756	Leadership PACs	$244,804
Lawyers/law firms	$597,674	Financial institutions	$243,636
Democratic/Liberal	$555,792	Lawyers/law firms	$228,379
Leadership PACs	$309,430	Real estate	$227,687
Universities	$298,298	Pharmaceuticals/health products	$204,302
Human rights organizations	$215,539	Insurance industry	$202,654
Health professionals	$202,654	Manufacturing & distributing	$169,104
Pro-Israel	$172,380	Health professionals	$150,149
Business services	$163,238	Lobbyists	$138,700
Source: OpenSecrets

=== Predictions ===
Source	Ranking	As of
The Cook Political Report	Tossup	November 1, 2012
Sabato's Crystal Ball	Lean D	November 5, 2012
Rothenberg Political Report	Tossup	November 2, 2012
Real Clear Politics	Tossup	November 5, 2012

=== Polling ===
Poll source	Date(s) administered	Sample size	Margin of error	Tammy Baldwin (D)	Tommy Thompson (R)	Other	Undecided
Public Policy Polling	May 19–22, 2011	1,636	±2.4%	44%	45%	—	11%
Public Policy Polling	August 12–14, 2011	830	±3.4%	42%	50%	—	8%
Public Policy Polling	October 20–23, 2011	1,170	±2.9%	44%	46%	—	10%
Rasmussen Reports	October 26, 2011	500	±4.5%	42%	49%	4%	6%
Marquette University	February 16–19, 2012	716	±3.7%	42%	48%	1%	9%
Public Policy Polling	February 23–26, 2012	900	±3.3%	46%	45%	—	9%
Rasmussen Reports	February 27, 2012	500	±4.5%	36%	50%	4%	10%
Rasmussen Reports	March 27, 2012	500	±4.5%	44%	48%	4%	4%
Public Policy Polling	April 13–15, 2012	1,136	±2.9%	45%	47%	—	8%
Rasmussen Reports	May 9, 2012	500	±4.5%	38%	50%	5%	7%
Public Policy Polling	May 11–13, 2012	851	±3.4%	42%	47%	—	11%
Rasmussen Reports	June 12, 2012	500	±4.5%	36%	52%	6%	6%
Marquette University	June 13–16, 2012	707	±3.8%	41%	49%	—	10%
Public Policy Polling	July 5–8, 2012	1,057	±3.0%	45%	45%	—	11%
Marquette University	July 5–8, 2012	810	±3.5%	41%	45%	—	14%
Rasmussen Reports	July 25, 2012	500	±4.5%	48%	41%	5%	6%
Marquette University	August 2–5, 2012	1,400	±2.6%	43%	48%	—	5%
Quinnipiac	July 31 – August 6, 2012	1,428	±2.6%	47%	47%	1%	5%
Rasmussen Reports	August 15, 2012	500	±4.5%	43%	54%	1%	3%
Public Policy Polling	August 16–19, 2012	1,308	±2.7%	44%	49%	—	7%
Marquette University	August 16–19, 2012	576	±4.2%	41%	50%	—	9%
CBS/NYT/Quinnipiac	August 15–21, 2012	1,190	±3.0%	44%	50%	1%	4%
YouGov	September 4–11, 2012	772	±n/a	42%	48%	—	10%
Public Policy Polling	September 12–13, 2012	959	±n/a	48%	45%	—	6%
Marquette University	September 13–16, 2012	705	±3.8%	50%	41%	—	5%
CBS/NYT/Quinnipiac	September 11–17, 2012	1,485	±2.5%	47%	47%	—	6%
NBC/WSJ/Marist Poll	September 16–18, 2012	968	±3.2%	48%	46%	—	5%
Public Policy Polling	September 18–19, 2012	842	±3.4%	49%	45%	—	6%
We Ask America	September 20–23, 2012	1,238	±2.8%	52%	40%	—	8%
Marquette University	September 27–30, 2012	894	±3.3%	48%	44%	—	6%
Public Policy Polling	October 4–6, 2012	979	±3.1%	49%	46%	—	6%
CBS/NYT/Quinnipiac	October 4–9, 2012	1,327	±2.7%	48%	46%	—	5%
Rasmussen Reports	October 9, 2012	500	±4.5%	51%	47%	1%	2%
YouGov	October 4–11, 2012	639	±4.9%	48%	43%	—	9%
Marquette University	October 11–14, 2012	870	±3.3%	45%	46%	—	7%
NBC/WSJ/Marist Poll	October 15–17, 2012	1,013	±3.1%	49%	45%	1%	5%
Mason-Dixon	October 15–17, 2012	625	±4%	47%	45%	—	8%
Rasmussen Reports	October 18, 2012	500	±4.5%	46%	48%	3%	3%
Angus Reid Public Opinion	October 18–20, 2012	502	±4.5%	45%	42%	3%	11%
Rasmussen Reports	October 25, 2012	500	±4.5%	47%	48%	2%	4%
Marquette University	October 25–28, 2012	1,243	±2.8%	47%	43%	—	10%
St. Norbert College	October 25–29, 2012	402	±5%	43%	46%	—	11%
Rasmussen Reports	October 29, 2012	750	±4.0%	48%	48%	1%	2%
NBC/WSJ/Marist	October 31, 2012	1,065	±3.0%	48%	47%	4%	1%
WeAskAmerica	October 31 – November 1, 2012	1,210	±3%	49%	46%	—	5%
YouGov	October 31 – November 3, 2012	1,225	±3.1%	48%	47%	—	5%
Angus Reid Public Opinion	November 1–3, 2012	482	±4.5%	50%	48%	2%	—
Public Policy Polling	November 2–3, 2012	1,256	±2.8%	51%	48%	—	2%

Hypothetical polling

with Tammy Baldwin

Poll source	Date(s) administered	Sample size	Margin of error	Tammy Baldwin (D)	Jeff Fitzgerald (R)	Other	Undecided
Public Policy Polling	May 19–22, 2011	1,636	±2.4%	48%	37%	—	15%
Public Policy Polling	October 20–23, 2011	1,170	±2.9%	44%	40%	—	16%
Rasmussen Reports	October 26, 2011	500	±4.5%	46%	39%	4%	6%
Marquette University	February 16–19, 2012	716	±3.7%	45%	37%	3%	15%
Public Policy Polling	February 23–26, 2012	900	±3.3%	47%	39%	—	14%
Rasmussen Reports	February 27, 2012	500	±4.5%	40%	41%	4%	15%
Rasmussen Reports	March 27, 2012	500	±4.5%	48%	40%	4%	7%
Public Policy Polling	April 13–15, 2012	1,136	±2.9%	47%	40%	—	13%
Rasmussen Reports	May 9, 2012	500	±4.5%	45%	41%	4%	9%
Rasmussen Reports	June 12, 2012	500	±4.5%	44%	43%	5%	8%
Marquette University	June 13–16, 2012	707	±3.8%	45%	39%	—	16%
Public Policy Polling	July 5–8, 2012	1,057	±3.0%	46%	42%	—	13%
Marquette University	July 5–8, 2012	810	±3.5%	43%	37%	—	20%
Rasmussen Reports	July 25, 2012	500	±4.5%	47%	37%	6%	10%
Marquette University	August 2–5, 2012	1,400	±2.6%	45%	40%	—	7%
Quinnipiac	July 31 – August 6, 2012	1,428	±2.6%	51%	39%	—	9%

Poll source	Date(s) administered	Sample size	Margin of error	Tammy Baldwin (D)	Eric Hovde (R)	Other	Undecided
Public Policy Polling	May 11–13, 2012	851	±3.4%	41%	45%	—	14%
Rasmussen Reports	June 12, 2012	500	±4.5%	42%	44%	4%	10%
Marquette University	June 13–16, 2012	707	±3.8%	45%	36%	—	19%
Public Policy Polling	July 5–8, 2012	1,057	±3.0%	44%	45%	—	11%
Marquette University	July 5–8, 2012	810	±3.5%	44%	38%	—	18%
Rasmussen Reports	July 25, 2012	500	±4.5%	45%	42%	5%	8%
Marquette University	August 2–5, 2012	1,400	±2.6%	44%	41%	—	9%
Quinnipiac	July 31 – August 6, 2012	1,428	±2.6%	47%	43%	1%	8%

Poll source	Date(s) administered	Sample size	Margin of error	Tammy Baldwin (D)	Mark Neumann (R)	Other	Undecided
Public Policy Polling	May 19–22, 2011	1,636	±2.4%	46%	41%	—	13%
Public Policy Polling	August 12–14, 2011	830	±3.4%	40%	44%	—	15%
Public Policy Polling	October 20–23, 2011	1,170	±2.9%	44%	43%	—	13%
Rasmussen Reports	October 26, 2011	500	±4.5%	44%	43%	4%	9%
Marquette University	February 16–19, 2012	716	±3.7%	44%	40%	2%	14%
Public Policy Polling	February 23–26, 2012	900	±3.3%	47%	41%	—	12%
Rasmussen Reports	February 27, 2012	500	±4.5%	37%	46%	4%	13%
Rasmussen Reports	March 27, 2012	500	±4.5%	48%	40%	4%	8%
Public Policy Polling	April 13–15, 2012	1,136	±2.9%	46%	45%	—	9%
Rasmussen Reports	May 9, 2012	500	±4.5%	42%	44%	4%	9%
Public Policy Polling	May 11–13, 2012	851	±3.4%	42%	46%	—	12%
Rasmussen Reports	June 12, 2012	500	±4.5%	43%	45%	5%	7%
Marquette University	June 13–16, 2012	707	±3.8%	44%	44%	—	12%
Public Policy Polling	July 5–8, 2012	1,057	±3.0%	45%	41%	—	13%
Marquette University	July 5–8, 2012	810	±3.5%	43%	40%	—	17%
Rasmussen Reports	July 25, 2012	500	±4.5%	48%	42%	3%	8%
Marquette University	August 2–5, 2012	1,400	±2.6%	44%	44%	—	6%
Quinnipiac	July 31 – August 6, 2012	1,428	±2.6%	48%	45%	1%	6%

Poll source	Date(s) administered	Sample size	Margin of error	Tammy Baldwin (D)	J. B. Van Hollen (R)	Other	Undecided
Public Policy Polling	May 19–22, 2011	1,636	±2.4%	46%	39%	—	15%

with Russ Feingold

Poll source	Date(s) administered	Sample size	Margin of error	Russ Feingold (D)	Jeff Fitzgerald (R)	Other	Undecided
Public Policy Polling	May 19–22, 2011	1,636	±2.4%	55%	39%	—	7%

Poll source	Date(s) administered	Sample size	Margin of error	Russ Feingold (D)	Mark Neumann (R)	Other	Undecided
Public Policy Polling	August 12–14, 2011	830	±3.4%	51%	44%	—	5%
Public Policy Polling	May 19–22, 2011	1,636	±2.4%	53%	41%	—	6%
Public Policy Polling	February 24–27, 2011	768	±3.5%	50%	40%	—	10%

Poll source	Date(s) administered	Sample size	Margin of error	Russ Feingold (D)	Paul Ryan (R)	Other	Undecided
Public Policy Polling	December 10–12, 2010	702	±3.7%	50%	43%	—	7%
Public Policy Polling	February 24–27, 2011	768	±3.5%	49%	42%	—	9%

Poll source	Date(s) administered	Sample size	Margin of error	Russ Feingold (D)	Tommy Thompson (R)	Other	Undecided
Public Policy Polling	December 10–12, 2010	702	±3.7%	49%	40%	—	11%
Public Policy Polling	May 19–22, 2011	1,636	±2.4%	52%	42%	—	6%
Public Policy Polling	August 12–14, 2011	830	±3.4%	48%	47%	—	5%

Poll source	Date(s) administered	Sample size	Margin of error	Russ Feingold (D)	J. B. Van Hollen (R)	Other	Undecided
Public Policy Polling	December 10–12, 2010	702	±3.7%	52%	41%	—	7%
Public Policy Polling	February 24–27, 2011	768	±3.5%	51%	39%	—	10%
Public Policy Polling	May 19–22, 2011	1,636	±2.4%	53%	38%	—	9%

with Steve Kagen

Poll source	Date(s) administered	Sample size	Margin of error	Steve Kagen (D)	Jeff Fitzgerald (R)	Other	Undecided
Public Policy Polling	May 19–22, 2011	1,636	±2.4%	43%	38%	—	19%

Poll source	Date(s) administered	Sample size	Margin of error	Steve Kagen (D)	Mark Neumann (R)	Other	Undecided
Public Policy Polling	May 19–22, 2011	1,636	±2.4%	42%	41%	—	17%
Public Policy Polling	August 12–14, 2011	830	±3.4%	38%	45%	—	17%

Poll source	Date(s) administered	Sample size	Margin of error	Steve Kagen (D)	Tommy Thompson (R)	Other	Undecided
Public Policy Polling	May 19–22, 2011	1,636	±2.4%	42%	45%	—	13%
Public Policy Polling	August 12–14, 2011	830	±3.4%	41%	49%	—	10%

Poll source	Date(s) administered	Sample size	Margin of error	Steve Kagen (D)	J. B. Van Hollen (R)	Other	Undecided
Public Policy Polling	May 19–22, 2011	1,636	±2.4%	43%	38%	—	19%

with Ron Kind

Poll source	Date(s) administered	Sample size	Margin of error	Ron Kind (D)	Jeff Fitzgerald (R)	Other	Undecided
Public Policy Polling	May 19–22, 2011	1,636	±2.4%	45%	37%	—	18%

Poll source	Date(s) administered	Sample size	Margin of error	Ron Kind (D)	Mark Neumann (R)	Other	Undecided
Public Policy Polling	May 19–22, 2011	1,636	±2.4%	44%	40%	—	16%
Public Policy Polling	August 12–14, 2011	830	±3.4%	40%	43%	—	17%

Poll source	Date(s) administered	Sample size	Margin of error	Ron Kind (D)	Tommy Thompson (R)	Other	Undecided
Public Policy Polling	May 19–22, 2011	1,636	±2.4%	44%	44%	—	12%
Public Policy Polling	August 12–14, 2011	830	±3.4%	41%	48%	—	11%

Poll source	Date(s) administered	Sample size	Margin of error	Ron Kind (D)	J. B. Van Hollen (R)	Other	Undecided
Public Policy Polling	May 19–22, 2011	1,636	±2.4%	44%	38%	—	17%

with Herb Kohl

Poll source	Date(s) administered	Sample size	Margin of error	Herb Kohl (D)	Mark Neumann (R)	Other	Undecided
Public Policy Polling	February 24–27, 2011	768	±3.5%	51%	37%	—	12%

Poll source	Date(s) administered	Sample size	Margin of error	Herb Kohl (D)	Paul Ryan (R)	Other	Undecided
Public Policy Polling	December 10–12, 2010	702	±3.7%	48%	42%	—	11%
Public Policy Polling	February 24–27, 2011	768	±3.5%	49%	42%	—	10%

Poll source	Date(s) administered	Sample size	Margin of error	Herb Kohl (D)	Tommy Thompson (R)	Other	Undecided
Public Policy Polling	December 10–12, 2010	702	±3.7%	49%	40%	—	11%

Poll source	Date(s) administered	Sample size	Margin of error	Herb Kohl (D)	J. B. Van Hollen (R)	Other	Undecided
Public Policy Polling	December 10–12, 2010	702	±3.7%	51%	38%	—	11%
Public Policy Polling	February 24–27, 2011	768	±3.5%	52%	37%	—	11%

=== Results ===
United States Senate election in Wisconsin, 2012
Party	Candidate	Votes	%	±%
Democratic	Tammy Baldwin	1,547,104	51.41%	−15.90%
Republican	Tommy Thompson	1,380,126	45.86%	+16.38%
Libertarian	Joseph Kexel	62,240	2.07%	N/A
Independent	Nimrod Allen, III	16,455	0.55%	N/A
Write-in		3,486	0.11%	+0.05%
Total votes		3,009,411	100.00%	N/A
Democratic hold				

==== Counties that flipped Democratic to Republican ====
- Barron (largest city: Rice Lake)
- Brown (largest city: Green Bay)
- Burnett (largest village: Grantsburg)
- Calumet (largest city: Chilton)
- Clark (largest city: Neillsville)
- Iron (largest city: Hurley)
- Jefferson (largest city: Watertown)
- Kewaunee (largest city: Algoma)
- Langlade (largest city: Antigo)
- Manitowoc (largest city: Manitowoc)
- Marathon (largest city: Wausau)
- Marinette (largest city: Marinette)
- Monroe (largest city: Sparta)
- Oconto (largest city: Oconto)
- Oneida (largest city: Rhinelander)
- Outagamie (largest city: Appleton)
- Rusk (largest city: Ladysmith)
- Shawano (largest city: Shawano)
- Washburn (largest city: Spooner)
- Waupaca (largest city: New London)
- Waushara (largest city: Berlin)
- Adams (largest city: Adams)
- Marquette (largest city: Montello)
- Polk (largest city: Amery)
- Sheboygan (largest city: Sheboygan)
- St. Croix (largest city: Hudson)
- Taylor (largest city: Medford)
- Florence (largest city: Florence)
- Vilas (largest city: Eagle River)
- Fond du Lac (largest city: Fond du Lac)
- Green Lake (largest city: Green Lake)
- Dodge (largest city: Juneau)
- Ozaukee (largest city: Mequon)
- Walworth (largest city: Whitewater)
- Washington (largest city: West Bend)
- Waukesha (largest city: Waukesha)

==== By congressional district ====
Despite losing the state, Thompson won five of eight congressional districts.

District	Thompson	Baldwin	Representative
1st	50.61%	46.56%	Paul Ryan
2nd	32.28%	65.82%	Mark Pocan
3rd	44.31%	52.77%	Ron Kind
4th	25.15%	72.93%	Gwen Moore
5th	61.06%	36.68%	Jim Sensenbrenner
6th	52.93%	44.05%	Tom Petri
7th	48.93%	48.06%	Sean Duffy
8th	50.21%	46.63%	Reid Ribble

== Aftermath ==
Brian Schimming, the vice chairman of the Wisconsin Republican Party, partly blamed Thompson's defeat on the fact that he had to face a competitive primary, whereas Baldwin was unopposed for the Democratic nomination: "[Thompson] blew all his money going through the primary. So when he gets through the primary, it was like three weeks before he was up on the air. [Baldwin] piled on immediately." He claimed "If [Thompson] hadn't had as ugly a primary, we could have won that seat."

== See also ==
- 2012 United States Senate elections
- 2012 United States House of Representatives elections in Wisconsin
- 2012 Wisconsin gubernatorial recall election
