= 2011 Outagamie County Executive election =

- April 5, 2011
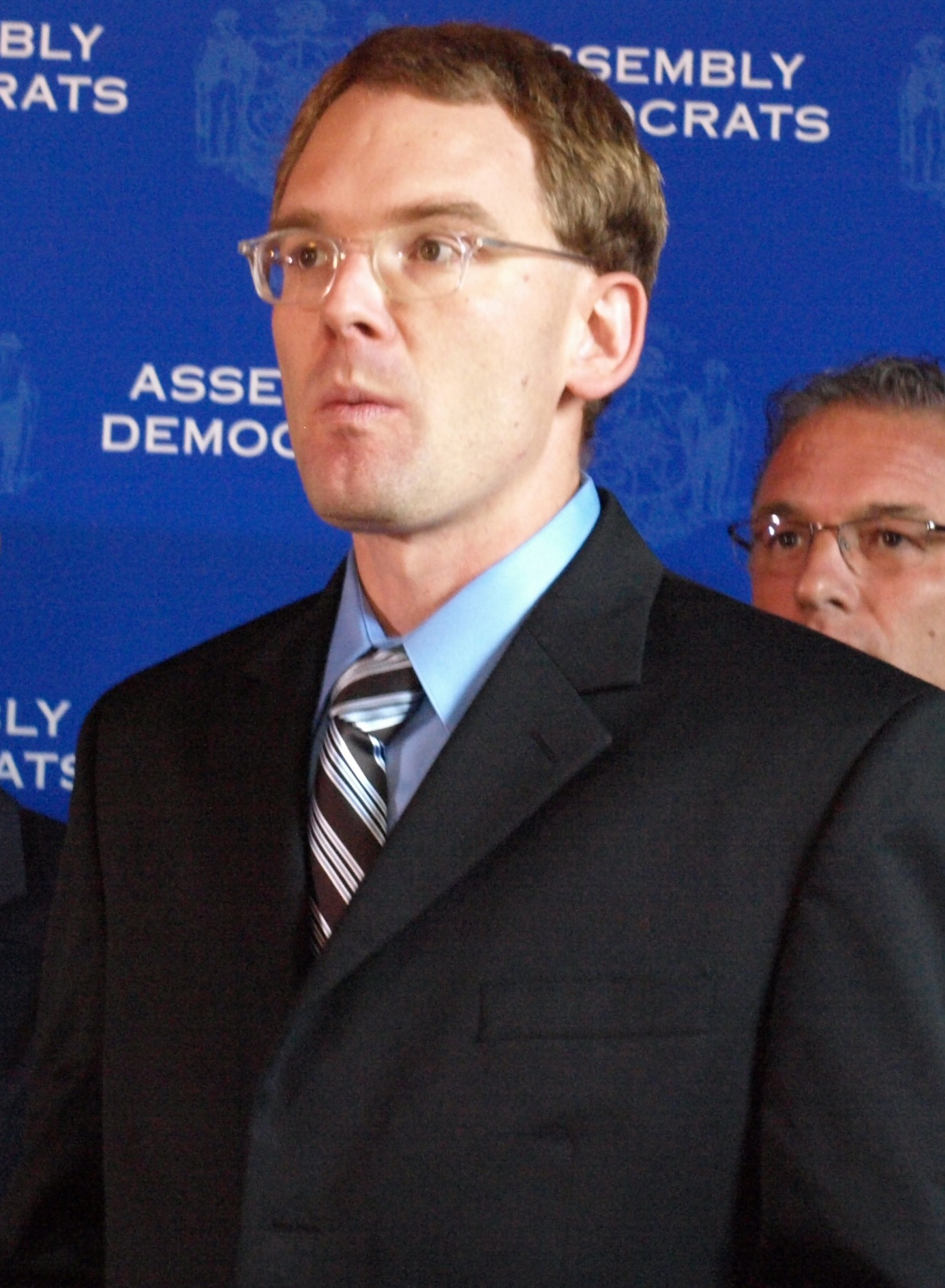

Nominee	Tom Nelson	Jack Voight
Party	Nonpartisan	Nonpartisan
Popular vote	14,693	13,886
Percentage	51.32%	48.50%
County Executive before election
Toby Paltzer
Nonpartisan
Elected County Executive
Tom Nelson
Nonpartisan

The 2011 Outagamie County Executive election took place on April 5, 2011, to elect the County Executive of Outagamie County, Wisconsin. Incumbent County Executive Toby Paltzer declined to seek re-election to a fourth term.

Six candidates ran to succeed Paltzer: former State Representative Tom Nelson; former State Treasurer Jack Voight; County Supervisors Charlie Kramer, Anne Strauch, and Mike Thomas; and Grand Chute Town Chairman Mike Marsden. Nelson and Voight placed first and second in the primary election by a wide margin, with Nelson receiving 34 percent of the vote and Voight receiving 33 percent, while Marsden placed a distant third with 11 percent. In the general election, Nelson narrowly defeated Voight, winning 52 percent of the vote.

== Primary election ==
=== Candidates ===
- Tom Nelson, former State Representative, 2010 Democratic nominee for Lieutenant Governor
- Jack Voight, former State Treasurer
- Mike Marsden, Grand Chute Town Chairman
- Anne Strauch, County Supervisor
- Mike Thomas, former County Supervisor
- Charlie Kramer, County Supervisor

==== Declined ====
- Toby Paltzer, incumbent County Executive

=== Results ===
Primary election results
Party	Candidate	Votes	%
Nonpartisan	Tom Nelson	5,215	34.04%
Nonpartisan	Jack Voight	5,098	33.28%
Nonpartisan	Mike Marsden	1,631	10.65%
Nonpartisan	Anne Strauch	1,433	9.36%
Nonpartisan	Mike Thomas	1,213	7.92%
Nonpartisan	Charlie Kramer	715	4.67%
Write-in		13	0.08%
Total votes		15,318	100.00%

== General election ==
=== Results ===
2011 Outagamie County Executive election
Party	Candidate	Votes	%
Nonpartisan	Tom Nelson	21,972	52.26%
Nonpartisan	Jack Voight	20,027	47.64%
Write-in		43	0.10%
Total votes		42,042	100.00%
