= 2010 Wisconsin elections =

- April 6, 2010; November 2, 2010

The 2010 Wisconsin Fall General Election was held in the U.S. state of Wisconsin on November 2, 2010. All of Wisconsin's executive and administrative officers were up for election as well as one of Wisconsin's U.S. Senate seats, Wisconsin's eight seats in the United States House of Representatives, seventeen seats in the Wisconsin State Senate, and all 99 seats in the Wisconsin State Assembly. The 2010 Wisconsin Fall Partisan Primary was held September 14, 2010.

In the November 2010 elections, Republican candidates swept every statewide race on the ballot in Wisconsin except for Secretary of State. In the process, they won the open seat for Governor and Lieutenant Governor, defeated the incumbent Democratic State Treasurer, and re-elected the incumbent Republican attorney general. They also won control of both chambers of the Wisconsin Legislature, defeated incumbent Democratic U.S. Senator Russ Feingold and U.S. Representative Steve Kagen, and won the open U.S. House seat previously held by Democrat Dave Obey.

The 2010 Wisconsin Spring Election was held on April 6, 2010. This election featured a contested election for the Wisconsin Court of Appeals and several other nonpartisan local and judicial races. The 2010 Wisconsin Spring Primary was held on February 16, 2010.

== Federal ==
=== United States Senate ===
Incumbent Democratic Senator Russ Feingold was challenged by Republican businessman Ron Johnson and Rob Taylor of the Constitution Party. Johnson defeated Feingold in the general election with 51.86% of the vote to Feingold's 47.02% and Taylor's 1.08%.

United States Senate Election in Wisconsin, 2010
Party	Candidate	Votes	%	±%
General Election, November 2, 2010
Republican	Ron Johnson	1,125,999	51.86%	+7.75%
Democratic	Russ Feingold (incumbent)	1,020,958	47.02%	−8.33%
Constitution	Rob Taylor	23,473	1.08%	
Write-in		901	0.04%	+0.01%
Plurality		105,041	4.84%	-6.40%
Turnout		2,171,331	100.0%	−26.39%
Republican gain from Democratic		Swing	16.08%	

=== United States House ===
All 8 of Wisconsin's seats in the United States House of Representatives were up for election in 2010. The Republican Party gained 2 seats, taking a 5-3 majority in the Wisconsin House delegation.

District	CPVI	Incumbent			Candidates (check mark indicates winner)	Result
District	CPVI	Representative	First Elected	Incumbent Status	Candidates (check mark indicates winner)	Result
Wisconsin 1	R+2	Paul Ryan	1998	Running	✓ Paul Ryan (Rep) 68.11%; John Heckenlively (Dem) 30.10%; Joseph Kexel (Lib) 1.64%	Incumbent re-elected.
Wisconsin 2	D+15	Tammy Baldwin	1998	Running	✓ Tammy Baldwin (Dem) 61.77%; Chad Lee (Rep) 38.16%	Incumbent re-elected.
Wisconsin 3	D+4	Ron Kind	1996	Running	✓ Ron Kind (Dem) 50.28%; Dan Kapanke (Rep) 46.49%; Michael Krsiean (Ind) 3.18%	Incumbent re-elected.
Wisconsin 4	D+22	Gwen Moore	2004	Running	✓ Gwen Moore (Dem) 68.98%; Dan Sebring (Rep) 29.57%; Eddie Ahmad Ayyash (Ind) 1.35%	Incumbent re-elected.
Wisconsin 5	R+12	Jim Sensenbrenner	1978	Running	✓ Jim Sensenbrenner (Rep) 69.32%; Todd P. Kolosso (Dem) 27.36%; Robert R. Raymond (Ind) 3.26%	Incumbent re-elected.
Wisconsin 6	R+4	Tom Petri	1979	Running	✓ Tom Petri (Rep) 70.66%; Joseph P. Kallas (Dem) 29.27%	Incumbent re-elected.
Wisconsin 7	D+4	Dave Obey	1969	Not Running	✓ Sean Duffy (Rep) 52.11%; Julie Lassa (Dem) 44.43%; Gary Kauther (Ind) 3.30%	Incumbent retired. New member elected. Republican gain.
Wisconsin 8	R+2	Steve Kagen	2006	Running	✓ Reid Ribble (Rep) 54.77%; Steve Kagen (Dem) 45.12%	Incumbent lost reelection. New member elected. Republican gain.

== Governor and lieutenant governor ==
Incumbent Governor Jim Doyle and Lieutenant Governor Barbara Lawton did not run for reelection. Democrat Tom Barrett and Republican Scott Walker, along with several third-party candidates, contested the seat. Walker defeated Barrett in the general election with 52.25% of the vote to Barrett's 46.48%.

This was the first open-seat gubernatorial election since 1982.

Wisconsin Gubernatorial Election, 2010
Party	Candidate	Votes	%	±%
General Election, November 2, 2010
Republican	Scott Walker / Rebecca Kleefisch	1,128,941	52.25%	+6.94%
Democratic	Tom Barrett / Tom Nelson	1,004,303	46.48%	−6.22%
Independent	Jim Langer / (no Lieutenant Governor candidate)	10,608	0.49%	
Independent	James James / (no Lieutenant Governor candidate)	8,273	0.38%	
Libertarian	(no Governor candidate) / Terry Virgil	6,790	0.31%	
Write-in		1,915	0.09%	-0.02%
Plurality		124,638	5.77%	-1.62%
Turnout		2,160,830	100.0%	−3.71%
Republican gain from Democratic		Swing	13.16%	

== Attorney general ==
2010 Wisconsin Attorney General election

Nominee	J. B. Van Hollen	Scott Hassett
Party	Republican	Democratic
Popular vote	1,220,791	890,080
Percentage	57.8%	42.1%
- County results Van Hollen: 50–60% 60–70% 70–80% Hassett: 50–60% 60–70% 70–80%
Attorney General before election
J.B. Van Hollen
Republican
Elected Attorney General
J.B. Van Hollen
Republican

Incumbent Republican J.B. Van Hollen defeated Democrat Scott Hassett in the race for Wisconsin Attorney General, winning 57.79% of the vote to Hassett's 42.13%.

Wisconsin Attorney General Election, 2010
Party	Candidate	Votes	%	±%
General Election, November 2, 2010
Republican	J. B. Van Hollen (incumbent)	1,220,791	57.79%	+7.64%
Democratic	Scott Hassett	890,080	42.13%	−7.60%
Write-in		1,614	0.08%	-0.04%
Plurality		330,711	15.66%	+15.24%
Turnout		2,112,485	100.0%	−0.56%
Republican hold				

== Secretary of state ==
2010 Wisconsin Secretary of State Election
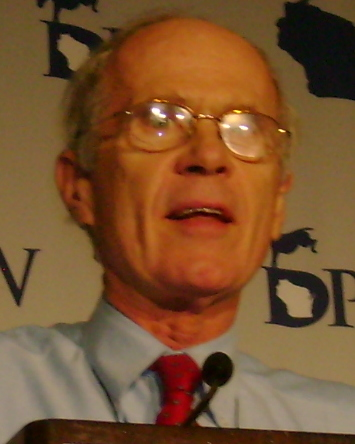

Candidate	Doug La Follette	David D. King
Party	Democratic	Republican
Popular vote	1,074,118	1,005,217
Percentage	51.6%	48.3%
- County results La Follette: 50–60% 60–70% 70–80% 80–90% King: 50–60% 60–70% 70–80%
Secretary of State before election
Doug La Follette
Democratic
Elected Secretary of State
Doug La Follette
Democratic

Incumbent Democrat Doug La Follette defeated Republican David King in the race for Wisconsin Secretary of State, winning 51.61% to King's 48.3%.

Wisconsin Secretary of State Election, 2010
Party	Candidate	Votes	%	±%
General Election, November 2, 2010
Democratic	Doug La Follette (incumbent)	1,074,118	51.61%	−6.46%
Republican	David D. King	1,005,217	48.30%	+9.25%
Write-in		1,863	0.09%	+0.02%
Plurality		68,901	3.31%	-15.71%
Turnout		2,081,198	100.0%	+2.01%
Democratic hold				

== Treasurer ==
2010 Wisconsin State Treasurer election

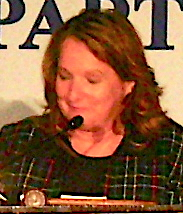
Nominee	Kurt W. Schuller	Dawn Marie Sass
Party	Republican	Democratic
Popular vote	1,101,320	958,468
Percentage	53.4%	46.5%
- County results Schuller: 50–60% 60–70% 70–80% Sass: 40–50% 50–60% 60–70% 70–80%
Treasurer before election
Dawn Marie Sass
Democratic
Elected Treasurer
Kurt W. Schuller
Republican

Republican challenger Kurt W. Schuller defeated incumbent Democrat Dawn Marie Sass in the race for Wisconsin Treasurer, winning 53.39% of the vote to Sass's 46.47%.

Wisconsin State Treasurer Election, 2010
Party	Candidate	Votes	%	±%
General Election, November 2, 2010
Republican	Kurt W. Schuller	1,101,320	53.39%	+6.50%
Democratic	Dawn Marie Sass (incumbent)	958,468	46.47%	−0.88%
Write-in		2,873	0.14%	+0.06%
Plurality		142,852	6.93%	+6.47%
Turnout		2,081,198	100.0%	+0.53%
Republican gain from Democratic		Swing	7.38%	

== Legislature ==
=== State senate ===
The 17 odd-numbered seats of the Wisconsin Senate were up for election in 2010. The Republican Party won control of the State Senate.

==== Summary ====
Seats	Party (majority caucus shading)		Total	Vacant
Seats	Democratic	Republican	Total	
Total after last election (2008)	18	15	33	0
Total before this election	18	15	33	0
Up for election	10	7	17	0
This election	6	11	17	0
Total after this election	14	19	33	0
Change in total	▼4	▲4	Steady	Steady

=== State Assembly ===
All 99 seats in the Wisconsin Assembly were up for election in 2010. The Republican Party won control of the Assembly.

==== Summary ====
Seats	Party (majority caucus shading)			Total	Vacant
Seats	Democratic	Ind.	Republican	Total	
Total after last election (2008)	52	1	46	99	0
Total before this election	50	2	45	97	2
This election	38	1	60	99	0
Total after this election	38	1	57	96	3
Change in total	▼12	▼1	▲12	Steady	▲1

=== Judiciary ===
==== State Court of Appeals ====
Three seats on the Wisconsin Court of Appeals were up for election in 2010, two of those seats were contested.

- In District I, Judge Joan F. Kessler was elected to her second six-year term without opposition.
- In District II, Wisconsin circuit court judge Paul F. Reilly narrowly defeated fellow-Waukesha County circuit judge Linda Van De Water, to succeed retiring judge Harry G. Snyder.
- In District IV, Dane County district attorney Brian Blanchard defeated Richland County circuit judge Edward Leineweber, to succeed retiring judge Charles P. Dykman.

Wisconsin Court of Appeals, District II Election, 2010
Party	Candidate	Votes	%
General Election, April 6, 2010
Nonpartisan	Paul F. Reilly	85,392	52.75%
Nonpartisan	Linda M. Van De Water	76,214	47.08%
	Scattering	268	0.17%
Plurality		9,178	5.67%
Total votes		161,874	100.0%

Wisconsin Court of Appeals, District IV Election, 2010
Party	Candidate	Votes	%
General Election, April 6, 2010
Nonpartisan	Brian Blanchard	104,918	62.65%
Nonpartisan	Edward E. Leineweber	62,135	37.10%
	Scattering	418	0.25%
Plurality		42,783	25.55%
Total votes		167,471	100.0%

==== State Circuit Courts ====
Forty four of the state's 249 circuit court seats were up for election in 2010. Nine of those seats were contested, only two incumbent judges faced a contested election and one was defeated.

Circuit	Branch	Incumbent	Elected			Defeated			Defeated in Primary
Circuit	Branch	Incumbent	Name	Votes	%	Name	Votes	%	Name(s)
Barron		James C. Babler	James C. Babler	4,541	99.74%	--Unopposed--			
Brown	3	Sue E. Bischel	Sue E. Bischel	22,645	99.24%	--Unopposed--			
Calumet		Donald A. Poppy	Donald A. Poppy	3,207	99.32%	--Unopposed--			
Crawford		--Vacant--	James P. Czajkowski	2,714	99.16%	--Unopposed--			
Dane	4	Amy R. Smith	Amy R. Smith	37,951	99.41%	--Unopposed--			
Dane	5	Nicholas J. McNamara	Nicholas J. McNamara	37,667	99.60%	--Unopposed--			
Dane	14	C. William Foust	C. William Foust	39,251	99.69%	--Unopposed--			
Dane	15	Stephen Ehlke	Stephen Ehlke	37,928	99.67%	--Unopposed--			
Dane	16	Sarah B. O'Brien	Sarah B. O'Brien	38,760	99.68%	--Unopposed--			
Dane	17	Peter C. Anderson	Peter C. Anderson	37,413	99.69%	--Unopposed--			
Dunn	1	Bill Stewart	Bill Stewart	4,320	99.47%	--Unopposed--			
Fond du Lac	2	Peter L. Grimm	Peter L. Grimm	8,867	99.48%	--Unopposed--			
Fond du Lac	4	Steven W. Weinke	Gary R. Sharpe	6,006	56.28%	Scot T. Mortier	4,658	43.65%	
Iowa		William Dyke	William Dyke	2,517	61.15%	Rhonda R. Hazen	1,597	38.80%	
Juneau	1	John Pier Roemer	John Pier Roemer	1,916	99.58%	--Unopposed--			
Kewaunee		Dennis J. Mleziva	Dennis J. Mleziva	1,600	99.13%	--Unopposed--			
Lincoln	1	Jay R. Tlusty	Jay R. Tlusty	3,024	98.73%	--Unopposed--			
Manitowoc	1	Patrick L. Willis	Patrick L. Willis	11,404	99.76%	--Unopposed--			
Marathon	2	Gregory Huber	Gregory Huber	8,906	99.21%	--Unopposed--			
Milwaukee	5	Mary M. Kuhnmuench	Mary M. Kuhnmuench	21,741	98.76%	--Unopposed--			
Milwaukee	14	Christopher R. Foley	Christopher R. Foley	22,839	98.97%	--Unopposed--			
Milwaukee	24	Charles F. Kahn Jr.	Charles F. Kahn Jr.	21,561	98.80%	--Unopposed--			
Milwaukee	25	Stephanie G. Rothstein	Stephanie G. Rothstein	21,486	98.90%	--Unopposed--			
Milwaukee	34	Glenn H. Yamahiro	Glenn H. Yamahiro	21,360	98.85%	--Unopposed--			
Milwaukee	37	Karen E. Christenson	Karen E. Christenson	21,745	98.96%	--Unopposed--			
Milwaukee	44	Daniel L. Konkol	Daniel L. Konkol	21,801	98.94%	--Unopposed--			
Milwaukee	45	Thomas P. Donegan	Thomas P. Donegan	21,961	98.94%	--Unopposed--			
Monroe	2	Michael J. McAlpine	Mark L. Goodman	4,055	61.83%	Kerry Sullivan-Flock	2,491	37.98%	
Monroe	3	--New Seat--	J. David Rice	5,602	98.75%	--Unopposed--			
Oconto	2	Richard D. Delforge	Jay N. Conley	2,931	56.41%	Edward Burke	2,246	43.23%	
Pierce		Robert W. Wing	Joe Boles	4,343	54.02%	Robert L. Loberg	3,694	45.95%	
Racine	2	Stephen A. Simanek	Eugene Gasiorkiewicz	10,549	54.08%	Georgia Herrera	8,949	45.88%	
Racine	4	John S. Jude	John S. Jude	13,398	99.35%	--Unopposed--			
Rock	2	Alan Bates	Alan Bates	9,453	99.24%	--Unopposed--			
Rusk		Frederick A. Henderson	Steven P. Anderson	1,700	96.87%	--Unopposed--			
Sauk	2	James Evenson	James Evenson	8,702	99.60%	--Unopposed--			
Vilas		Neal A. Nielsen III	Neal A. Nielsen III	1,272	98.15%	--Unopposed--			
Walworth	2	James L. Carlson	James L. Carlson	9,781	98.95%	--Unopposed--			
Walworth	4	Michael S. Gibbs	David M. Reddy	7,298	61.02%	David A. Danz	4,623	38.65%	
Waukesha	2	Richard A. Congdon	Mark Gundrum	41,561	76.76%	Richard A. Congdon	12,560	23.20%	
Waupaca	2	John P. Hoffmann	John P. Hoffmann	3,086	99.42%	--Unopposed--			
Winnebago	3	Barbara Hart Key	Barbara Hart Key	15,427	99.28%	--Unopposed--			
Winnebago	5	William H. Carver	John Jorgensen	10,525	54.58%	Edmund J. Jelinski	8,724	45.24%	
Wood	2	James Mason	James Mason	6,366	99.52%	--Unopposed--			
