= Dawn Marie Sass =

State Treasurer of Wisconsin from 2007 – 2011

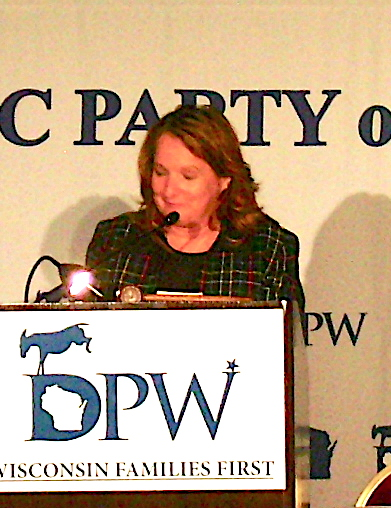
- Sass in 2007

33rd Treasurer of Wisconsin
- In office January 3, 2007 – January 3, 2011
- Governor: Jim Doyle
- Preceded by: Jack Voight
- Succeeded by: Kurt W. Schuller

Member of the Board of Supervisors of Green County, Wisconsin from the 30th district
- Incumbent
- Assumed office April 2020
- Preceded by: Ray Francois

Personal details
- Born: September 18, 1959 (age 67) Milwaukee, Wisconsin, U.S.
- Party: Democratic
- Education: University of Wisconsin, Milwaukee (BA); National Louis University; Keiser University (MBA)

Dawn Marie Sass (born September 18, 1959) is an American public administrator and Democratic politician from Green County, Wisconsin. She served as the 33rd State Treasurer of Wisconsin from 2007 to 2011. She currently serves as a member of the Green County board of supervisors, and as town clerk of Exeter, Wisconsin.

== Early life and education ==
Born in Milwaukee, Wisconsin, Sass graduated from St. Mary's Academy. She earned a Bachelor of Arts degree in history and political science from the University of Wisconsin–Milwaukee and did graduate work at National Louis University. Sass later earned a Master of Business Administration from Keiser University.

== Career ==
Sass worked as a full-time custody placement specialist, juvenile probation officer, and child welfare worker for Milwaukee County, where she was an active member and official of her union, the American Federation of State, County and Municipal Employees. She also worked as a part-time retail clerk at Boston Store (Wisconsin) and a part-time Pharmacy Technician at St. Luke's Hospital in Milwaukee.

=== Wisconsin Treasurer ===
Sass first ran for State Treasurer against incumbent Republican Jack Voight in 1998; she lost with 754,177 votes (46.3%) to Voight's 814,380 (50.0%), with 31,452 (1.9%) for the Wisconsin Greens nominee, 28,561 (1.7%) for the Libertarian Tim Peterson, and 171 (.01%) for the Taxpayers' Party candidate. She was a delegate to the 2000 Democratic National Convention; and ran unsuccessfully for the Wisconsin State Senate's 33rd district in a 2001 special election to succeed Margaret Farrow, losing the race to Ted Kanavas 10,238 to 3,557. She ran once more in 2002 against Voight, losing again with 720,445 votes to Voight's 824,049 and 114,955 for Green Paul Aschenbrenner; and ran unsuccessfully in 2004 for Milwaukee County Treasurer.

In 2006, she defeated incumbent Voight on November 7, 2006, in a narrow upset victory by a margin of 8,648 votes(0.42%) with little party support. She had spent almost $4000 on the race, most of it coming from her own pocket (she was working as a store clerk at Boston Store at this time).

On November 2, 2010, Sass was defeated for reelection by Kurt W. Schuller.

During her term as State Treasurer, Sass traveled to all 72 Wisconsin counties every year of her four-year term. She credits former U.S. Senator Russ Feingold for giving her the blueprint for the county visits (she had the honor after her election to visit several counties with the Senator). In her four years, Sass helped reunite Wisconsinites with just over $100 million in unclaimed property money, stream-lined the process for claiming unclaimed funds, and staffed the State Treasurer booth at the Wisconsin State Fair helping to process claims for visitors to the booth. Sass also started contests for school-aged children to raise awareness of the Wisconsin 529 savings plan - EdVest. The contests included a coloring contest for 1st - 3rd graders where they drew what they wanted to be when they grew up, an essay contest for 4-6th graders where they described what they wanted to be when they grew up and a video contest for 9th and 10th graders - where they made a video to describe what they wanted to be or how they would choose their college. The winners of the first coloring contest saw their drawings made into a poster that was distributed to public libraries throughout the state. The winners of the first essay contest were invited to the Governor's residence, with family and teachers, to read their essay's and enjoy a reception. The video winner's were invited to a U.W. Board of Regents meeting where they showed the winning videos and had a small reception after. Several of the members of the Board of Regents commented it was one of the best meetings they had attended. In all, sixty-seven students were awarded EdVest College Savings Accounts ranging from $500.00 to $1,000.00.

=== Other campaigns ===
In February 2012, she lost to fellow Democrats Tim Carpenter and Spencer Coggs (like Sass, a former AFSCME activist) in the four-way non-partisan primary to win a place on the ballot for Milwaukee City Treasurer in the Spring 2012 election. Coggs polled 13,559 votes; Carpenter 12,880; Sass 5,089 and Socialist Rick Kissell 2,241.

In August 2014 she lost to former Assemblyman David Cullen for the Democratic nomination for Milwaukee County Treasurer; Cullen drew 38,492 votes (53%) to Sass' 33,729 (47%). (There was no candidate in any other party's primary in that race.)

In 2018, she ran in the Democratic statewide primary for Wisconsin State Treasurer, this time facing two female opponents. One of her opponents was Cynthia Kaump, a small business owner and financial professional from Madison, Wisconsin, who also had been a political and investigative reporter on television news for over two decades. However, Kaumps' momentum as she was gaining in the polls dropped significantly when a week before the primary it was revealed by the Milwaukee Journal Sentinel that she owed money to a tax preparer business. Sass' main opponent in the primary was Eau Claire, Wisconsin native, Sarah Godlewski. Although a successful entrepreneur, Godlewski had an inside track as she was the National Finance Council co-chair of Ready PAC, the a political action committee in support of the Hillary Clinton 2016 presidential campaign. She was also the Wisconsin Women's Director for Clinton's 2016 campaign. Godlewski co-chaired, with Jack Voight, the Save Our Fiscal Watchdog Committee, a successful grassroots Get Out The Vote effort which defeated an April 2018 proposed amendment to the Wisconsin Constitution to eliminate the office of state treasurer.

=== Green County Supervisor ===
In 2020, Sass (who had moved to Belleville, Wisconsin) announced her candidacy for Green County Supervisor. She focused her campaign on corporate farms stating: "Green County has always been a farming community. These large farms are pushing farming families out that have been in our community for generations. We all need to help each other and fight for small family farms." She faced attorney Skip Miller and in the April election and was elected with 62% of the vote.

== Electoral history ==
=== Wisconsin State Treasurer (1998) ===
Wisconsin State Treasurer Election, 1998
Party	Candidate	Votes	%	±%
General Election, November 3, 1998
Republican	Jack Voight (incumbent)	814,380	50.00%	−6.15%
Democratic	Dawn Marie Sass	754,177	46.30%	+7.81%
Green	Jeffrey L. Peterson	31,452	1.93%	
Libertarian	Tim Peterson	28,561	1.75%	−0.60%
U.S. Taxpayers'	Robert Gerald Bernhoft	171	0.01%	
Plurality		60,203	3.70%	-13.96%
Total votes		1,628,741	100.0%	+12.51%
Republican hold				

=== Wisconsin Senate (2001) ===
Wisconsin Senate, 33rd District Special Election, 2001
Party	Candidate	Votes	%	±%
Special Election, July 10, 2001
Republican	Theodore Kanavas	10,238	74.22%	
Democratic	Dawn Marie Sass	3,557	25.78%	
Plurality		6,681	48.43%	
Total votes		13,795	100.0%	-71.85%
Republican hold				

=== Wisconsin State Treasurer (2002, 2006, 2010) ===
Wisconsin State Treasurer Election, 2002
Party	Candidate	Votes	%	±%
General Election, November 5, 2002
Republican	Jack Voight (incumbent)	824,049	49.61%	−0.39%
Democratic	Dawn Marie Sass	720,445	43.37%	−2.93%
Green	Paul Aschenbrenner	114,955	6.92%	+4.99%
	Scattering	1,526	0.09%	
Plurality		103,604	6.24%	+2.54%
Total votes		1,660,975	100.0%	+1.98%
Republican hold				

Wisconsin State Treasurer Election, 2006
Party	Candidate	Votes	%	±%
General Election, November 7, 2006
Democratic	Dawn Marie Sass	971,598	47.35%	+3.98%
Republican	Jack Voight (incumbent)	962,209	46.89%	−2.72%
Libertarian	Tim Peterson	59,203	2.89%	
Green	Winston Sephus Jr.	57,326	2.79%	−4.13%
	Scattering	1,529	0.07%	
Plurality		9,389	0.46%	-5.78%
Total votes		2,051,865	100.0%	+23.53%
Democratic gain from Republican				

Wisconsin State Treasurer Election, 2010
Party	Candidate	Votes	%	±%
General Election, November 2, 2010
Republican	Kurt W. Schuller	1,101,320	53.39%	+6.50%
Democratic	Dawn Marie Sass (incumbent)	958,468	46.47%	−0.88%
	Scattering	2,873	0.14%	
Plurality		142,852	6.93%	+6.47%
Total votes		2,062,661	100.0%	+0.53%
Republican gain from Democratic				

=== Wisconsin State Treasurer (2018) ===
Wisconsin State Treasurer Election, 2018
Party	Candidate	Votes	%	±%
Democratic Primary, August 14, 2018
Democratic	Sarah Godlewski	201,031	43.46%	
Democratic	Dawn Marie Sass	148,362	32.07%	
Democratic	Cynthia Kaump	112,255	24.27%	
	Scattering	965	0.21%	
Plurality		52,669	11.39%	
Total votes		462,613	100.0%	

Party political offices
Preceded by Dismas Becker	Democratic nominee for Treasurer of Wisconsin; 1998, 2002, 2006, 2010	Succeeded by Dave Sartori
Political offices
Preceded by Jack Voight	Treasurer of Wisconsin; 2007–2011	Succeeded by Kurt W. Schuller
