= Mark Neumann =

American businessman and politician (born 1954)

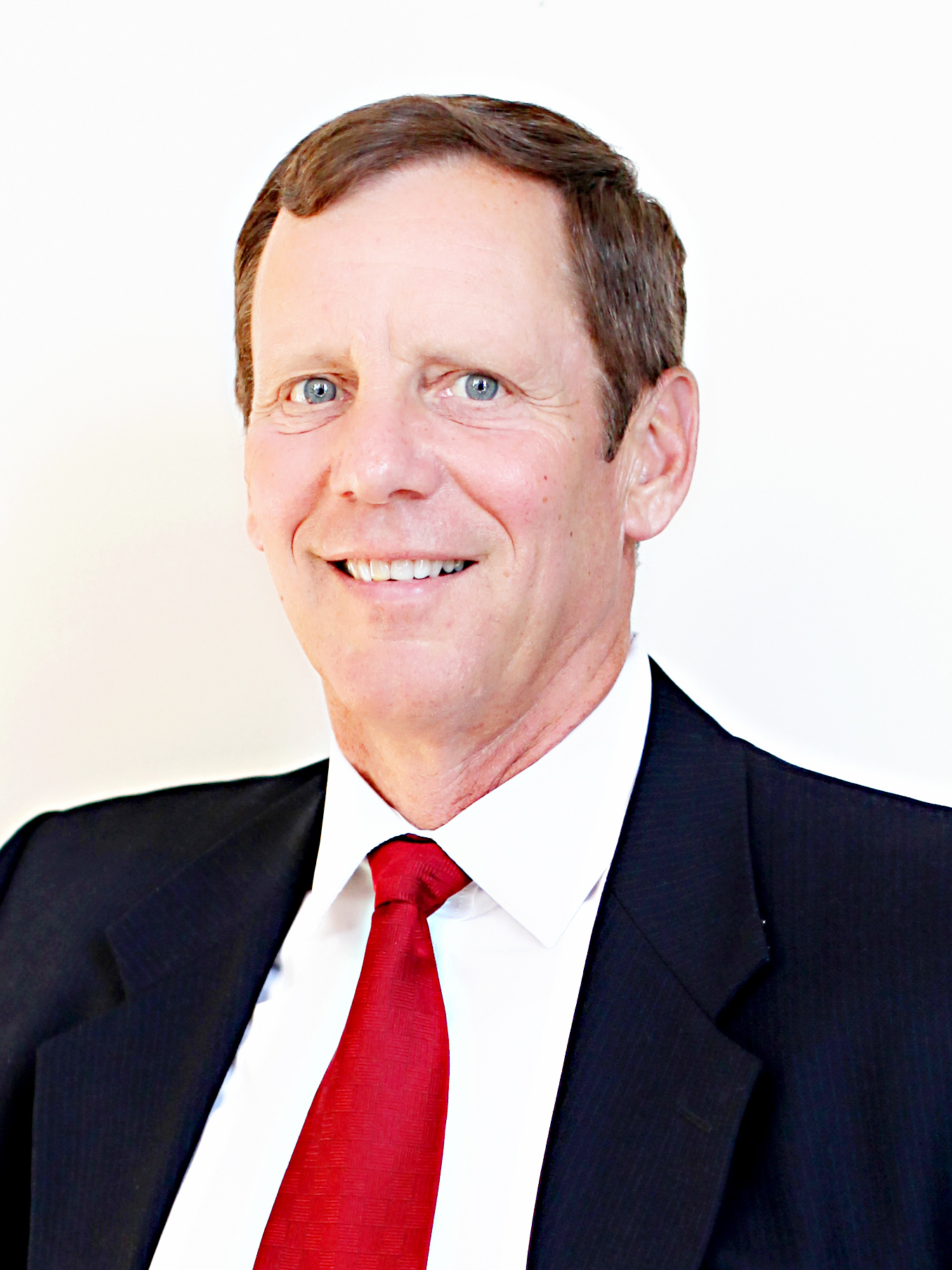
- Neumann in 2009

Member of the U.S. House of Representatives from Wisconsin's 1st district
- In office January 3, 1995 – January 3, 1999
- Preceded by: Peter Barca
- Succeeded by: Paul Ryan

Personal details
- Born: Mark William Neumann; February 27, 1954 (age 72) East Troy, Wisconsin, U.S.
- Party: Republican
- Spouse: Sue Neumann
- Children: 3
- Education: Kettering University; University of Wisconsin, Whitewater (BS); University of Wisconsin, River Falls (MS); University of Wisconsin, Madison

Mark William Neumann (born February 27, 1954) is an American businessman and politician. He represented Wisconsin's 1st congressional district for two terms, from 1995 to 1999. In 2010, Neumann unsuccessfully sought the Republican nomination for governor. In 2012, Neumann ran for the U.S. senate seat held by retiring Democratic senator Herb Kohl, placing third in the Republican primary.

== Early life, education, and early career ==
Neumann was born in East Troy, Wisconsin, one of five siblings. His parents were Stella and Kurt Neumann. His father was an electrical engineer for General Motors and his mother was an executive assistant. Neumann graduated from East Troy High School in 1972. After high school, he briefly attended General Motors Institute (now Kettering University). In 1973, Neumann married Sue Link, his high school sweetheart, whom he met in Sunday school in the 4th grade. That same year, Neumann enrolled at the University of Wisconsin–Whitewater, where he graduated with honors in 1975, earning a Bachelor of Science in Mathematics. After graduating from Whitewater, Neumann moved to River Falls, Wisconsin, where he taught mathematics at River Falls High School while attending the University of Wisconsin–River Falls, earning a Masters of Science in Supervision and Instructional Leadership. Neumann did additional post-graduate work at the University of Wisconsin–Madison.

After college, Neumann relocated to Milton, Wisconsin, where he began his career teaching Mathematics at Milton High School and Milton College before the campus closed in 1982. Neumann is a member of the Wisconsin Evangelical Lutheran Synod. He started his first company in 1986 in his basement, building homes in the Milton and Janesville, Wisconsin areas. By 1991, Neumann's company was listed as one of the fastest-growing companies in the U.S. by Inc. Magazine.

== U.S. House of Representatives ==
=== Elections ===
1992

Neumann decided to run for the House of Representatives as a Republican in 1992. He faced Congressman Les Aspin and lost 58% to 41%, while spending $700,000.

U.S. House of Representatives, Wisconsin 1st District Election, 1992
Party	Candidate	Votes	%	±%
Primary Election
Democratic	Les Aspin (incumbent)	32,815	62.24%	
Republican	Mark W. Neumann	16,547	31.38%	
Republican	Kenneth Elmer	3,364	6.38%	
Total votes		'52,726'	'100.0%'	
General Election
Democratic	Les Aspin (incumbent)	147,495	57.56%	
Republican	Mark W. Neumann	104,352	40.72%	
Independent	John Graf	4,391	1.71%	
Total votes		'256,238'	'100.0%'	
Democratic hold				

1993 special election

Shortly after defeating Neumann, Aspin was appointed U.S. Secretary of Defense by President Bill Clinton in 1993. Just months after being defeated by over 17%, Neumann entered the special election to fill the seat vacated by Aspin. Neumann lost narrowly to his opponent, Peter Barca by only 675 votes; 49.3% to Barca's 49.9%.

U.S. House of Representatives, Wisconsin 1st District Special Election, 1993
Party	Candidate	Votes	%	±%
Primary Election
Democratic	Peter W. Barca	31,073	31.03%	
Republican	Mark W. Neumann	28,115	28.08%	
Democratic	Jeffrey A. Neubauer	21,610	21.58%	
Democratic	Wayne W. Wood	8,254	8.24%	
Republican	Charles W. Coleman	7,567	7.56%	
Democratic	Jeffrey C. Thomas	1,814	1.81%	
Democratic	Samuel Platts	1,094	1.09%	
Libertarian	Edward J. Kozak	613	0.61%	
Total votes		'100,140'	'100.0%'	
General Election
Democratic	Peter W. Barca	55,605	49.90%	
Republican	Mark W. Neumann	54,930	49.29%	
Libertarian	Edward J. Kozak	375	0.34%	
Independent	Gary W. Thompson	327	0.34%	
Independent	Karl Huebner	203	0.34%	
Total votes		'111,440'	'100.0%'	
Democratic hold				

1994

After losing in both 1992 and 1993, Neumann once again entered the race for Wisconsin’s First Congressional District. After losing to Peter Barca by 675 votes in the previous year, Neumann defeated Barca by 1,120 votes, becoming the first Republican to hold that seat since 1971. Neumann's victory was one of 52 Republican pick-up seats during the Republican Revolution.

U.S. House of Representatives, Wisconsin 1st District Election, 1994
Party	Candidate	Votes	%	±%
General Election
Republican	Mark W. Neumann	83,937	49.42%	
Democratic	Peter W. Barca (incumbent)	82,817	48.76%	
Libertarian	Edward J. Kozak	3,085	1.82%	
Total votes		'169,839'	'100.0%'	
Republican gain from Democratic				

1996

Neumann won re-election by 4,260 votes in a close 1996 race against Lydia Spottswood.

U.S. House of Representatives, Wisconsin 1st District Election, 1996
Party	Candidate	Votes	%	±%
General Election
Republican	Mark W. Neumann (incumbent)	118,408	50.92%	
Democratic	Lydia Spottswood	114,148	49.08%	
Total votes		'232,556'	'100.0%'	
Republican hold				

=== Tenure ===
Neumann was sworn into the 104th United States Congress on January 3, 1995, when the Republican Party gained control of both houses for the first time since the 1950s. Neumann was assigned to the Appropriations committee, being the only freshman appointed to the committee that year. While on the committee, Neumann wrote his own version of the budget, which would produce a balanced budget by 1999. Neumann voted present in the election for Speaker of the House in 1997, instead of voting for Newt Gingrich.

In September 1995, Neumann introduced an amendment requiring congressional approval of troop deployment to Bosnia which failed to pass. Then, on September 29, he voted to defeat the $243 billion military appropriation, along with other freshman Members, because it did not contain his amendment. As punishment for his vote, Bob Livingston removed him from the committee. This was brief, and Neumann was eventually reassigned to the committee.

Neumann has been critical of LGBT rights in the past. In 1996, he commented to the New York Times that "if I was elected God for a day, homosexuality wouldn't be permitted, but nobody's electing me God".

=== Committee assignments ===
Congressman Neumann served on the following committees and subcommittees:

- Committee on Appropriations
  - Veterans Administration
  - Transportation, Housing and Urban Development, and Related Agencies
- Committee on the Budget

== 1998 U.S. Senate election ==
In September 1997, Neumann announced his candidacy for the United States Senate against incumbent Russ Feingold. Both candidates had similar views on the budget surplus, although Neumann was for banning partial-birth abortion while Feingold was against a ban. Both candidates limited themselves to $3.8 million in campaign spending ($1 for every citizen of Wisconsin), although outside groups spent more than $2 million on Neumann; Feingold refused to have outside groups spend on his behalf. Feingold defeated Neumann by 37,787 votes in the election, 51% to 48%. Neumann had a 68,000-vote deficit in Milwaukee County.

Wisconsin U.S. Senatorial Election, 1998
Party	Candidate	Votes	%	±%
General Election
Democratic	Russ Feingold (incumbent)	890,059	50.55%	
Republican	Mark W. Neumann	852,272	48.40%	
Constitution	Robert R. Raymond	7,942	0.45%	
Libertarian	Tom Ender	5,591	0.32%	
Independent	Eugene A. Hem	4,266	0.24%	
	Write-ins	706	0.04%	
Total votes		'1,760,836'	'100.0%'	
Democratic hold				

== Post-congressional career ==
Neumann stayed out of the 2004 Senate campaign, instead supporting former Lt. Governor Margaret Farrow, who did not run. Despite speculation that Neumann might run against Senator Herb Kohl or Governor Jim Doyle, he did not choose to seek elective office during the 2006 election cycle. He had considered a run for governor, but did not enter the race in deference to Scott Walker, who withdrew in favor of former Congressman Mark Green.

=== 2010 gubernatorial election ===
Neumann told the Wisconsin State Journal on April 23, 2009 that he intended to run for governor in 2010, and on July 1, 2009, Neumann officially declared his candidacy.

In 2010 Neumann stated his opposition to same-sex marriage, and claimed that he wanted to focus on jobs and economic development.

Neumann was defeated 59% to 39% in the September 14, 2010, primary by opponent Scott Walker. Walker was ultimately elected governor in the general election.

Wisconsin Gubernatorial Election, 2010
Party	Candidate	Votes	%	±%
Primary Election
Republican	Scott Walker	362,913	58.65%	
Republican	Mark W. Neumann	239,022	38.62%	
Republican	Scott S. Paterick	16,646	2.69%	
	Write-ins	321	0.14%	
Total votes		'618,828'	'100.0%'	

=== 2012 U.S. Senate election ===
In August 2011, Neumann announced his candidacy for the Senate seat of retiring senator Herb Kohl. On October 6, 2011, it was announced that he had raised $300,000 during the first month of the campaign. After receiving endorsements from conservative groups such as the Club for Growth and Americans For Prosperity, Neumann split the Tea Party vote with millionaire businessman Eric Hovde. Neumann came in third place, taking 23% of the vote.

Wisconsin U.S. Senatorial Election, 2012
Party	Candidate	Votes	%	±%
Primary Election
Republican	Tommy Thompson	197,928	33.99%	
Republican	Eric Hovde	179,557	30.83%	
Republican	Mark W. Neumann	132,786	22.28%	
Republican	Jeff Fitzgerald	71,871	12.34%	
	Write-ins	244	0.04%	
Total votes		'582,386'	'100.0%'	

U.S. House of Representatives
Preceded by Peter W. Barca	Member of the U.S. House of Representatives from Wisconsin's 1st congressional district 1995–1999	Succeeded by Paul Ryan
Party political offices
Preceded by Bob Kasten	Republican nominee for U.S. Senator from Wisconsin (Class 3); 1998	Succeeded by Tim Michels
U.S. order of precedence (ceremonial)
Preceded by Cindy Axne as Former U.S. Representative	Order of precedence of the United States as Former U.S. Representative	Succeeded by Steve Kagen as Former U.S. Representative
