= 2010 Wisconsin gubernatorial election =

- November 2, 2010
- Turnout: 49.7%
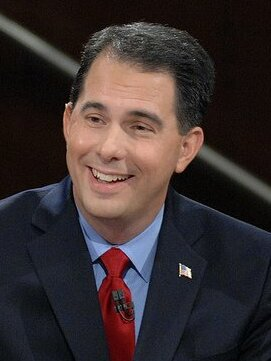

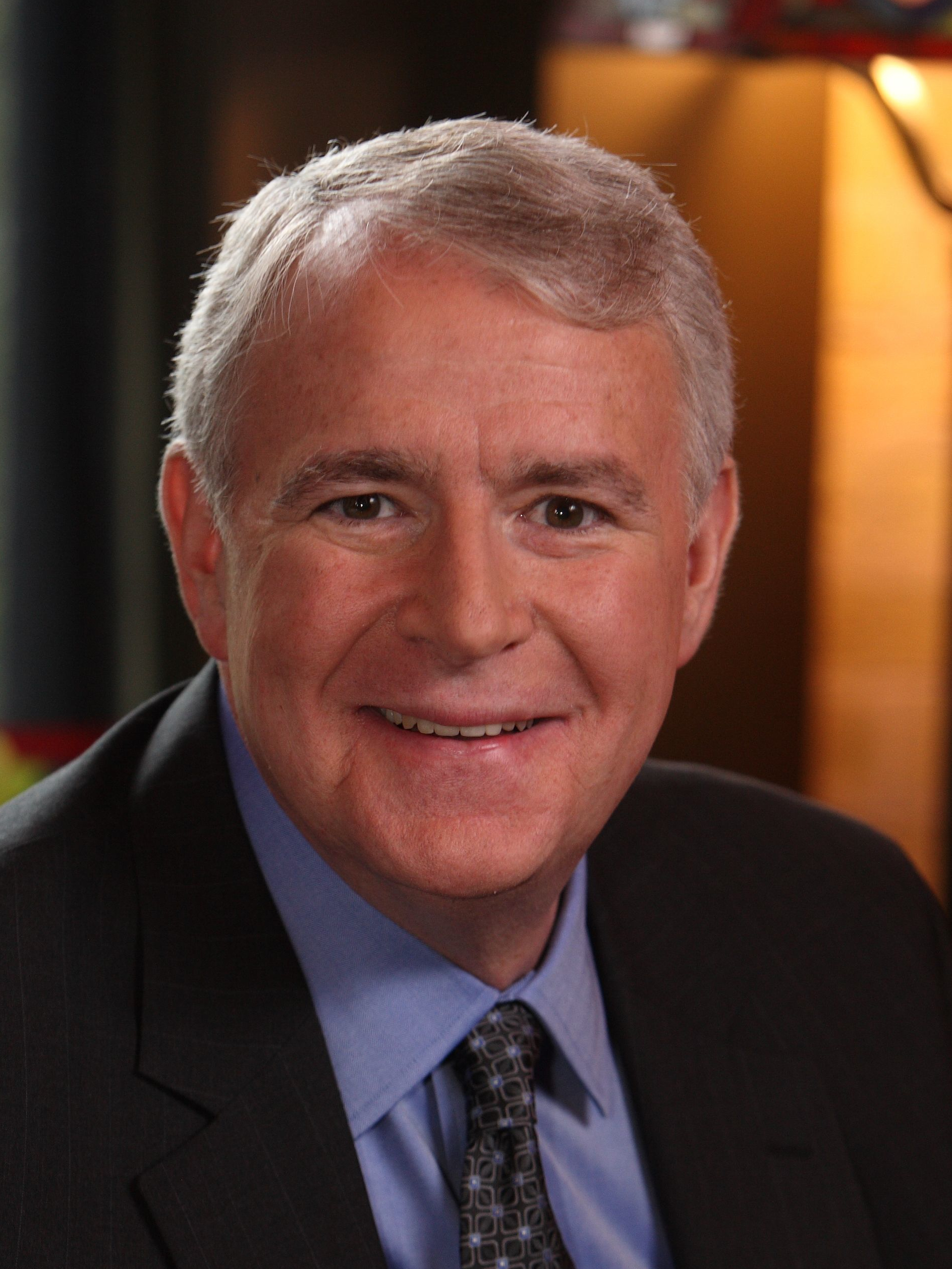
Nominee	Scott Walker	Tom Barrett
Party	Republican	Democratic
Running mate	Rebecca Kleefisch	Tom Nelson
Popular vote	1,128,941	1,004,303
Percentage	52.25%	46.48%
- Walker: 40–50% 50–60% 60–70% 70–80% 80–90% >90% Barrett: 40–50% 50–60% 60–70% 70–80% 80–90% >90% Tie: 50%
Governor before election
Jim Doyle
Democratic
Elected Governor
Scott Walker
Republican

The 2010 Wisconsin gubernatorial election took place on November 2, 2010, to elect the governor and lieutenant governor of Wisconsin. The primary elections on September 14 determined which candidates advanced to the general election.

Incumbent Democratic governor Jim Doyle did not seek re-election in 2010, making for the first open gubernatorial election in Wisconsin since 1982. Republican nominee Scott Walker, the Milwaukee County executive, defeated Democratic nominee Tom Barrett, the mayor of Milwaukee. As of 2022, this was the last gubernatorial election in which a Republican gubernatorial candidate carried La Crosse and Columbia counties, and the last in which a Democratic candidate carried Trempealeau County.

== Democratic primary ==
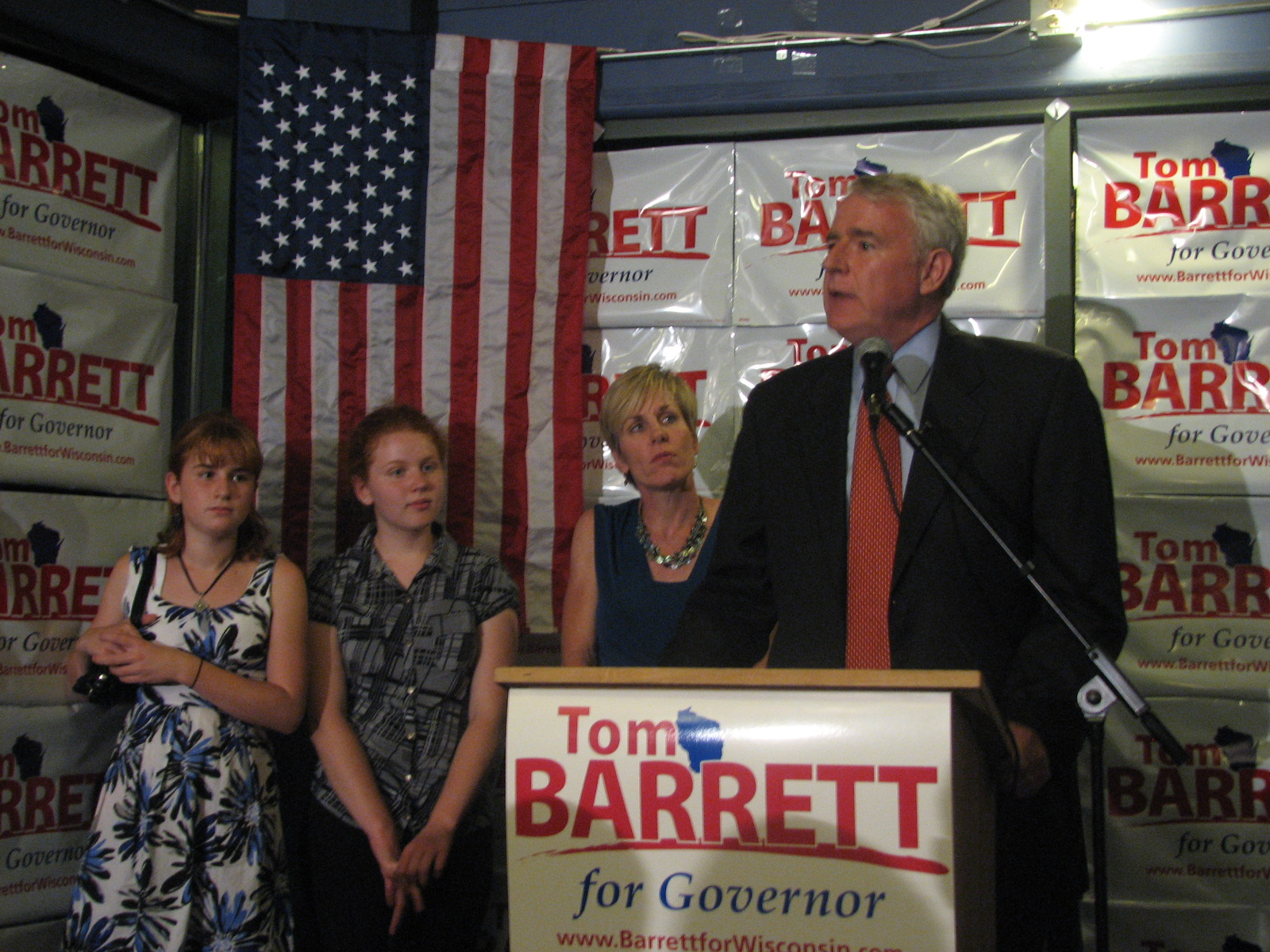
Barrett celebrating his victory in the Democratic primary

=== Governor ===
==== Candidates ====
- Tom Barrett, mayor of Milwaukee and former U.S. representative and candidate in 2002
- Tim John

==== Failed to qualify ====
- Jared Gary Christiansen
- Dominic Reinwand

==== Withdrawn ====
- Barbara Lawton, incumbent lieutenant governor (2003–2011)

==== Declined ====
- Jim Doyle, incumbent governor (2003–2011)
- Ron Kind, U.S. representative from Wisconsin's 3rd congressional district

==== Results ====
Democratic gubernatorial primary results
Party	Candidate	Votes	%
Democratic	Tom Barrett	213,145	90.41%
Democratic	Tim John	22,296	9.46%
Democratic	Scattering	321	0.14%
Total votes		235,762	100.00%

=== Lieutenant governor ===
==== Candidates ====
===== Nominee =====
- Tom Nelson, assembly majority leader (2009–2011) from the 5th district.

===== Eliminated in primary =====
- Spencer Coggs, state senator from the 6th district (2003–2011) and former state representative (1983–2003)
- Henry Sanders
- James L. Schneider

===== Declined =====
- Barbara Lawton, incumbent lieutenant governor (2003–2011)

==== Results ====
Democratic lieutenant gubernatorial primary results
Party	Candidate	Votes	%
Democratic	Tom Nelson	108,765	51.84%
Democratic	Spencer Coggs	43,807	20.88%
Democratic	James L. Schneider	37,519	17.88%
Democratic	Henry Sanders	19,387	9.24%
Democratic	Scattering	322	0.15%
Total votes		209,800	100.00%

== Republican primary ==
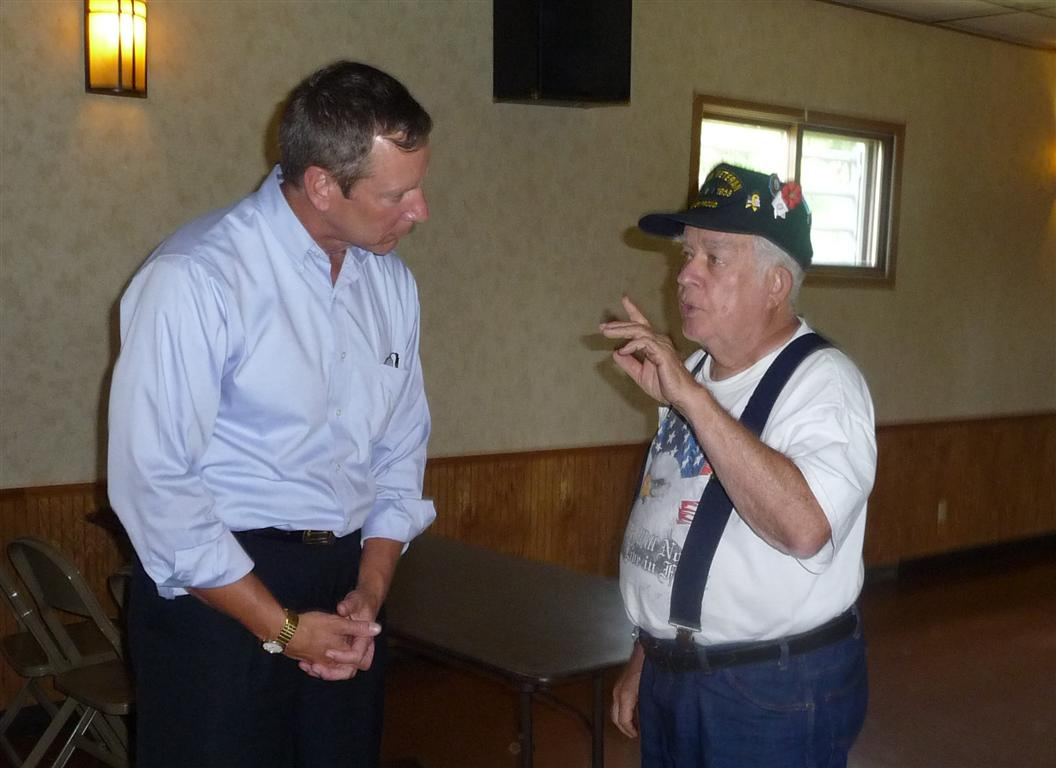
Candidate Mark Neumann speaks with an attendee at a campaign event

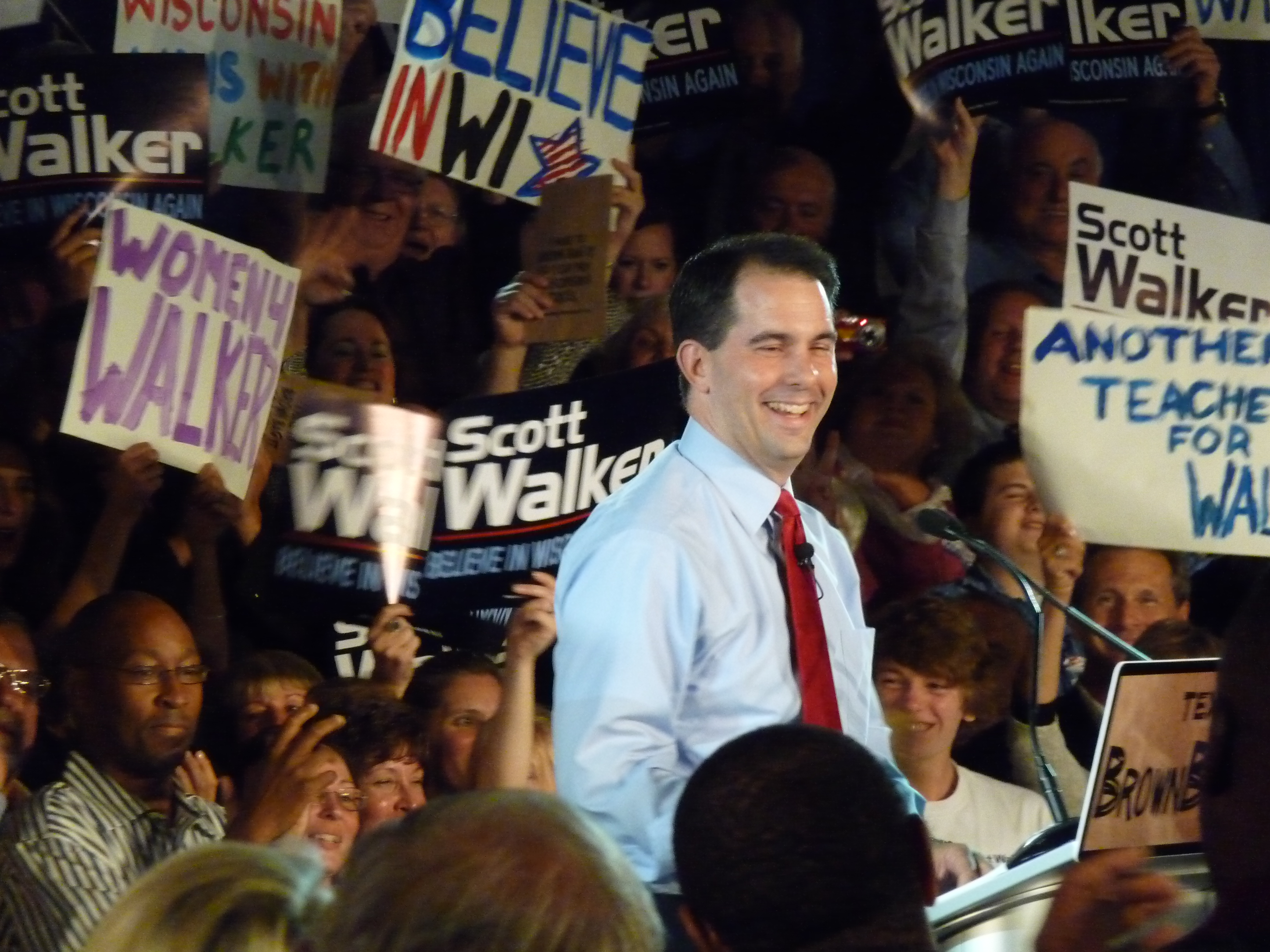
Walker celebrating his victory in the Republican primary

=== Governor ===
==== Candidates ====
===== Nominee =====
- Scott Walker, Milwaukee County executive and candidate in 2006

===== Eliminated in primary =====
- Mark Neumann, former U.S. representative and nominee for the U.S. Senate in 1998
- Scott S. Paterick

==== Failed to qualify ====
- William "Bill" Ingram, truck driver and write-in candidate for president of the United States in 2008
- John Schless

=== Polling ===
Poll source	Dates administered	Mark Neumann	Scott Walker
Public Policy Polling	June 26–27, 2010	19%	58%
WPRI	March 9, 2010	27%	46%
WPRI	October 1, 2009	14%	39%

=== Results ===
Results by county: Walker—70–80% Walker—60–70% Walker—50–60% Walker—40–50% Neumann—40–50% Neumann—50–60%

Republican gubernatorial primary results
Party	Candidate	Votes	%
Republican	Scott Walker	362,913	58.65%
Republican	Mark Neumann	239,022	38.62%
Republican	Scott S. Paterick	16,646	2.69%
Republican	Scattering	247	0.04%
Total votes		618,828	100.00%

=== Lieutenant governor ===
==== Candidates ====
===== Nominee =====
- Rebecca Kleefisch, former WISN-TV morning anchor.

===== Eliminated in primary =====
- Brett Davis, state representative from the 80th district.
- Robert Gerald Lorge, perennial candidate
- Dave Ross, mayor of Superior, Wisconsin
- Nick Voegeli

==== Results ====
Republican lieutenant gubernatorial primary results
Party	Candidate	Votes	%
Republican	Rebecca Kleefisch	258,714	46.78%
Republican	Brett Davis	139,997	25.31%
Republican	Dave Ross	80,617	14.58%
Republican	Robert Gerald Lorge	52,076	9.42%
Republican	Nick Voegeli	21,040	3.80%
Republican	Scattering	628	0.11%
Total votes		553,072	100.00%

== Libertarian primary ==
=== Governor ===
There were no qualified candidates in the Libertarian gubernatorial primary.

=== Lieutenant governor ===
==== Candidates ====
- Terry Virgil

==== Results ====
Libertarian lieutenant gubernatorial primary results
Party	Candidate	Votes	%
Libertarian	Terry Virgil	403	96.18%
Libertarian	Scattering	16	3.82%
Total votes		419	100.00%

== Independent nominations ==
=== Candidates ===
- Jim Langer (Independent)
- James James (Common Sense)

=== Failed to qualify ===
- Michael J. Blinkwitz

=== Results ===
Independent gubernatorial primary results
Party	Candidate	Votes	%
Independent	Jim Langer	1,657	72.96%
Independent	James James	614	27.04%
Total votes		2,271	100.00%

== General election ==
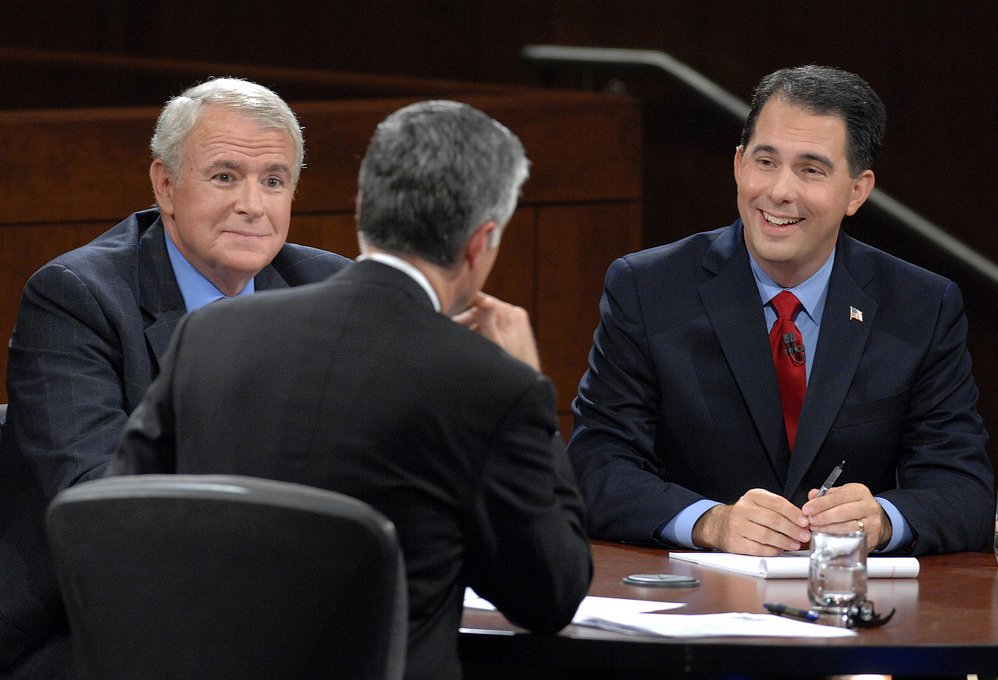
Barrett (left) and Walker (right) debating each other on October 15

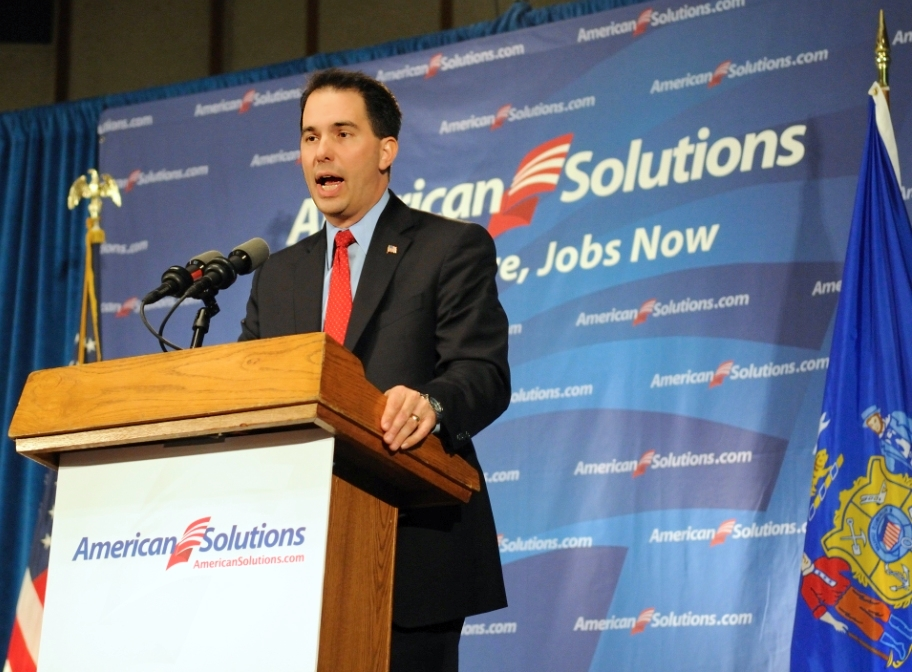
Walker campaigning at an October event hosted by American Solutions

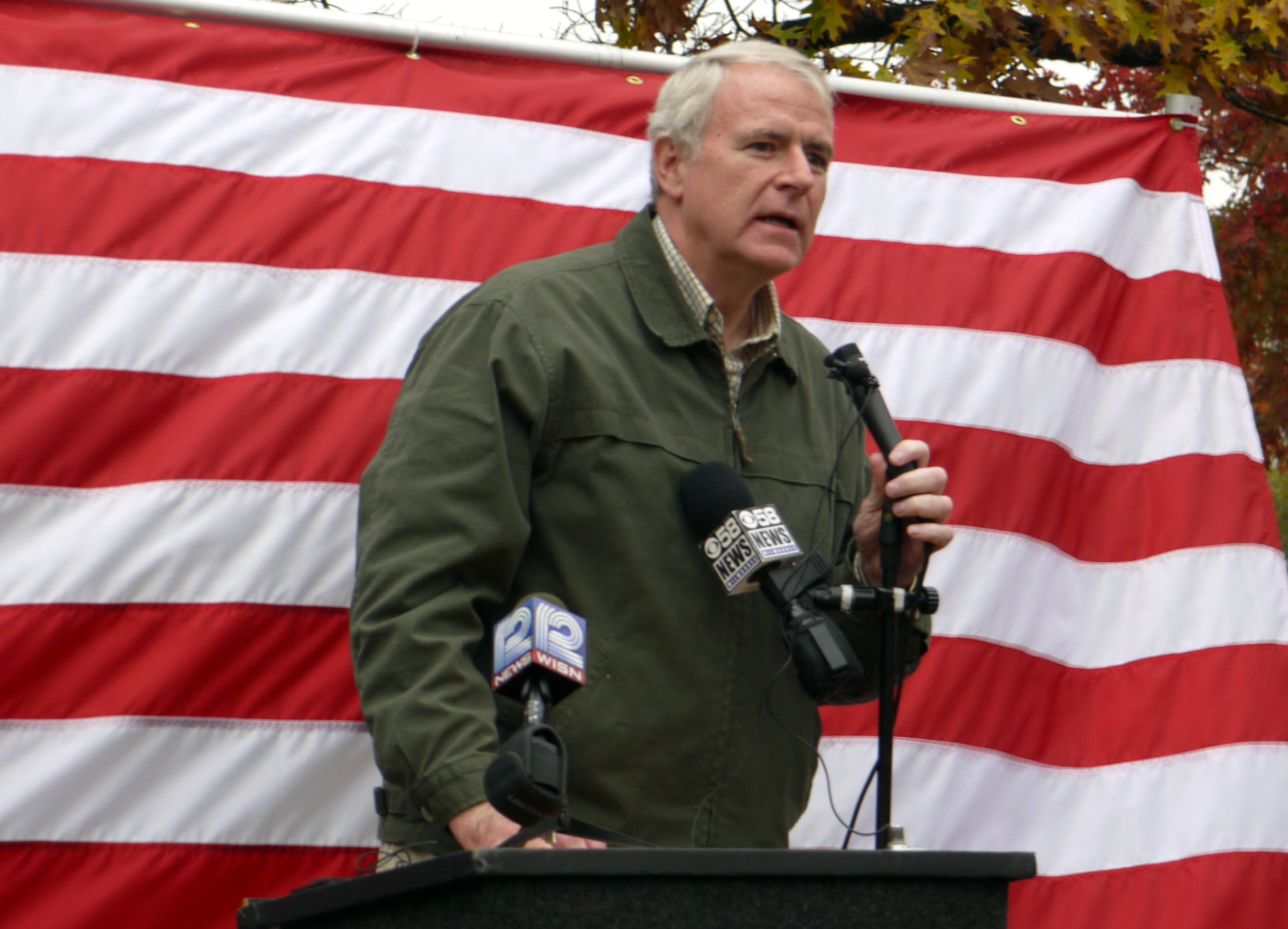
Barrett at a campaign rally in Milwaukee in October

=== Candidates ===
Seven candidates appeared on the primary election ballot: two Democrats, three Republicans and two other candidates. After Walker and Barrett won their respective primaries, they faced each other and independent candidates using the "Independent" and "Common Sense" labels in the November general election.

=== Predictions ===
Source	Ranking	As of
Cook Political Report	Tossup	October 14, 2010
Rothenberg Political Report	Lean R (flip)	October 28, 2010
RealClearPolitics	Lean R (flip)	November 1, 2010
Sabato's Crystal Ball	Likely R (flip)	October 28, 2010
CQ Politics	Tossup	October 28, 2010

=== Polling ===
Poll source	Dates administered	Tom Barrett (D)	Scott Walker (R)
McClatchy	October 20, 2010	40%	52%
Wisconsin Herald	October 16, 2010	44%	52%
CNN/Time Magazine	October 8–12, 2010	44%	52%
Rasmussen Reports	October 11, 2010	42%	51%
Ipsos/Reuters	October 8–11, 2010	42%	52%
Rasmussen Reports	September 29, 2010	44%	50%
CNN/Time	September 17–21, 2010	42%	53%
Public Policy Polling	September 18–19, 2010	41%	50%
Rasmussen Reports	September 15, 2010	43%	51%
Rasmussen Reports	August 24, 2010	44%	47%
Rasmussen Reports	August 10, 2010	41%	49%
Rasmussen Reports	July 27, 2010	43%	50%
Rasmussen Reports	July 13, 2010	44%	48%
Public Policy Polling	June 26–27, 2010	38%	45%
Rasmussen Reports	June 21, 2010	41%	49%
Rasmussen Reports	May 25, 2010	41%	48%
Rasmussen Reports	April 20, 2010	44%	46%
Public Policy Polling	March 20–21, 2010	39%	42%
Rasmussen Reports	March 16, 2010	42%	48%
WPRI	March 9, 2010	32%	36%
Rasmussen Reports	February 17, 2010	40%	49%
Rasmussen Reports	January 26, 2010	38%	48%
Public Policy Polling	November 20–22, 2009	40%	40%

=== Results ===
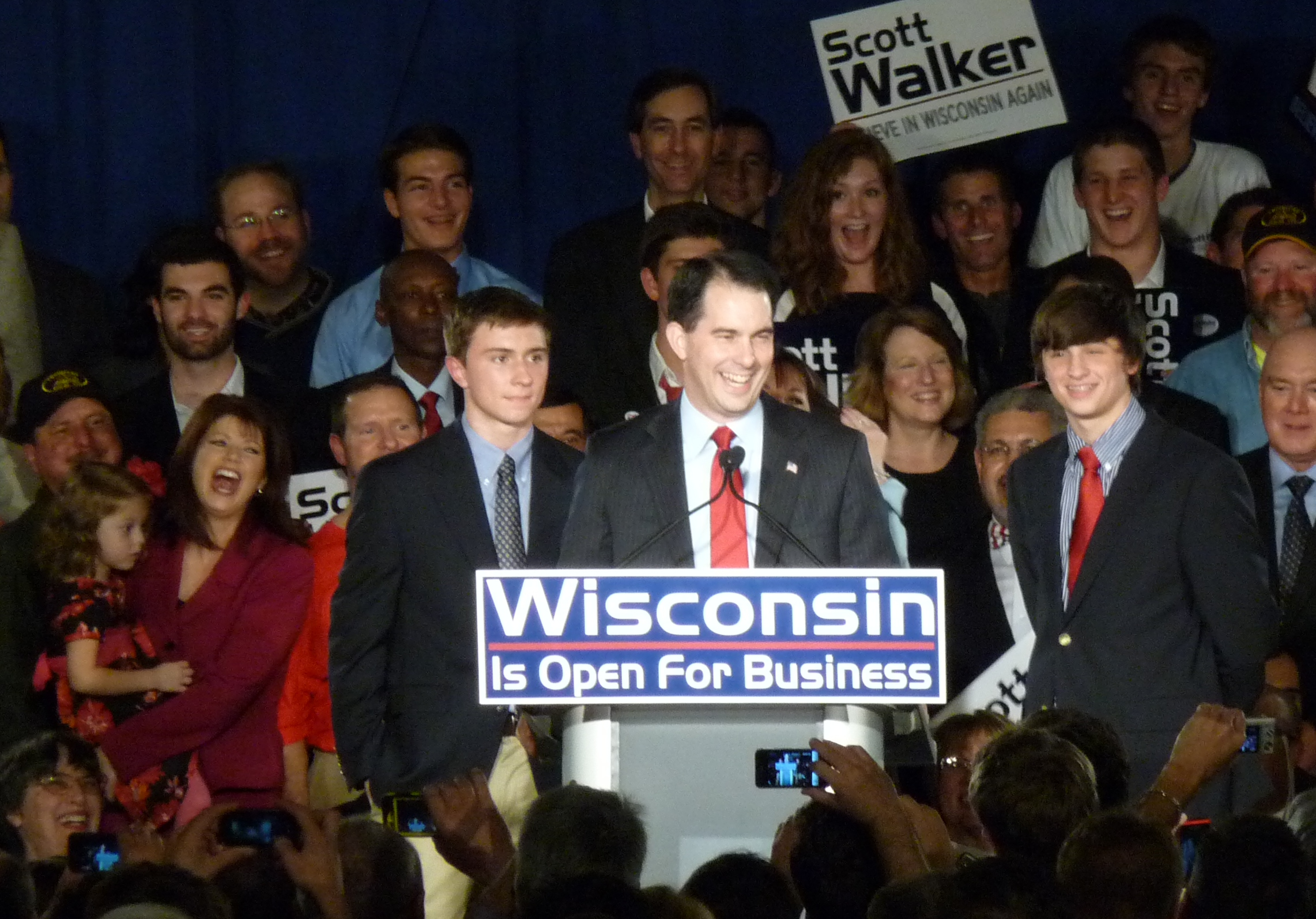
Walker celebrating his victory on election night

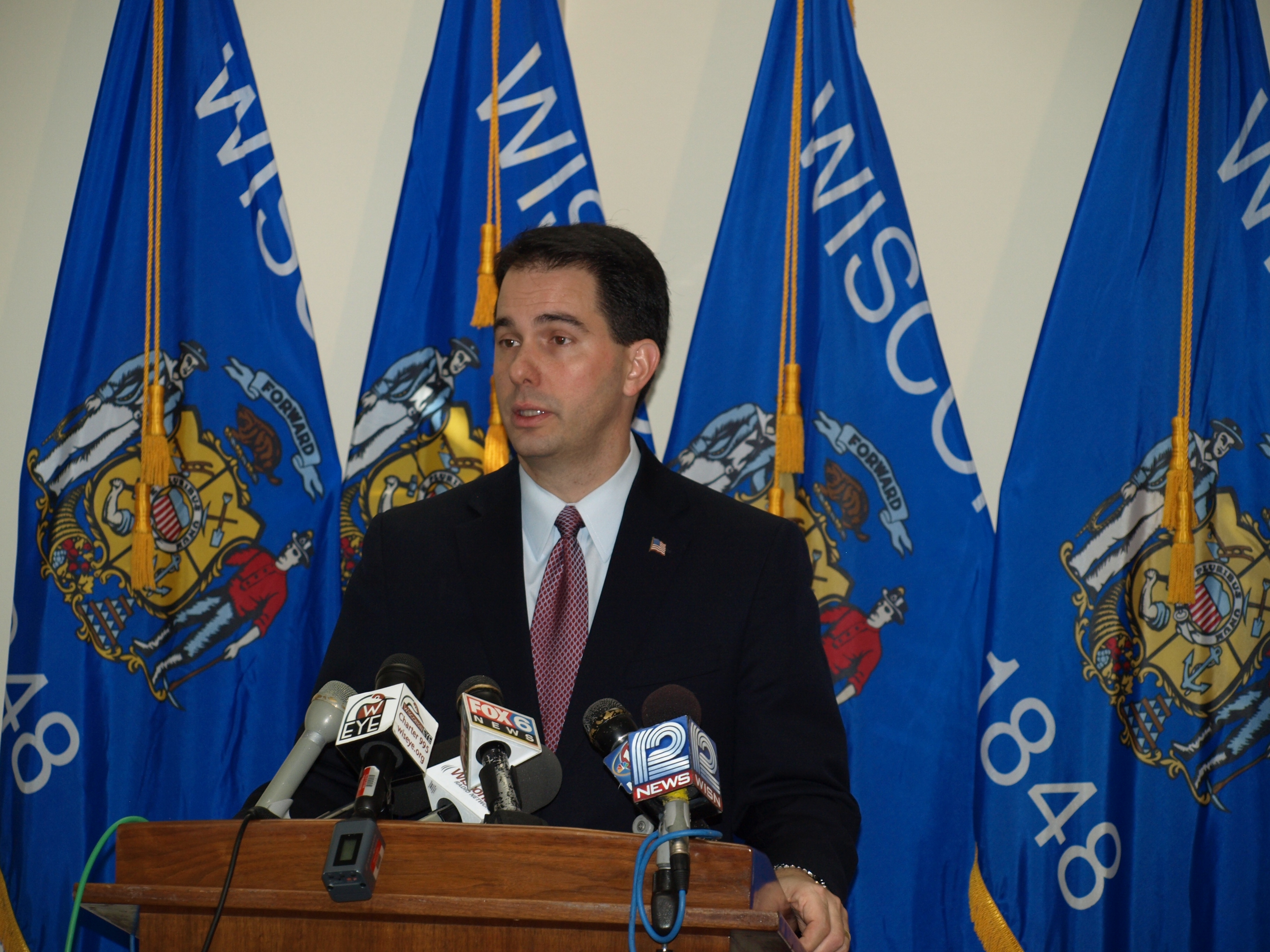
Governor-elect Walker holding a press conference in December

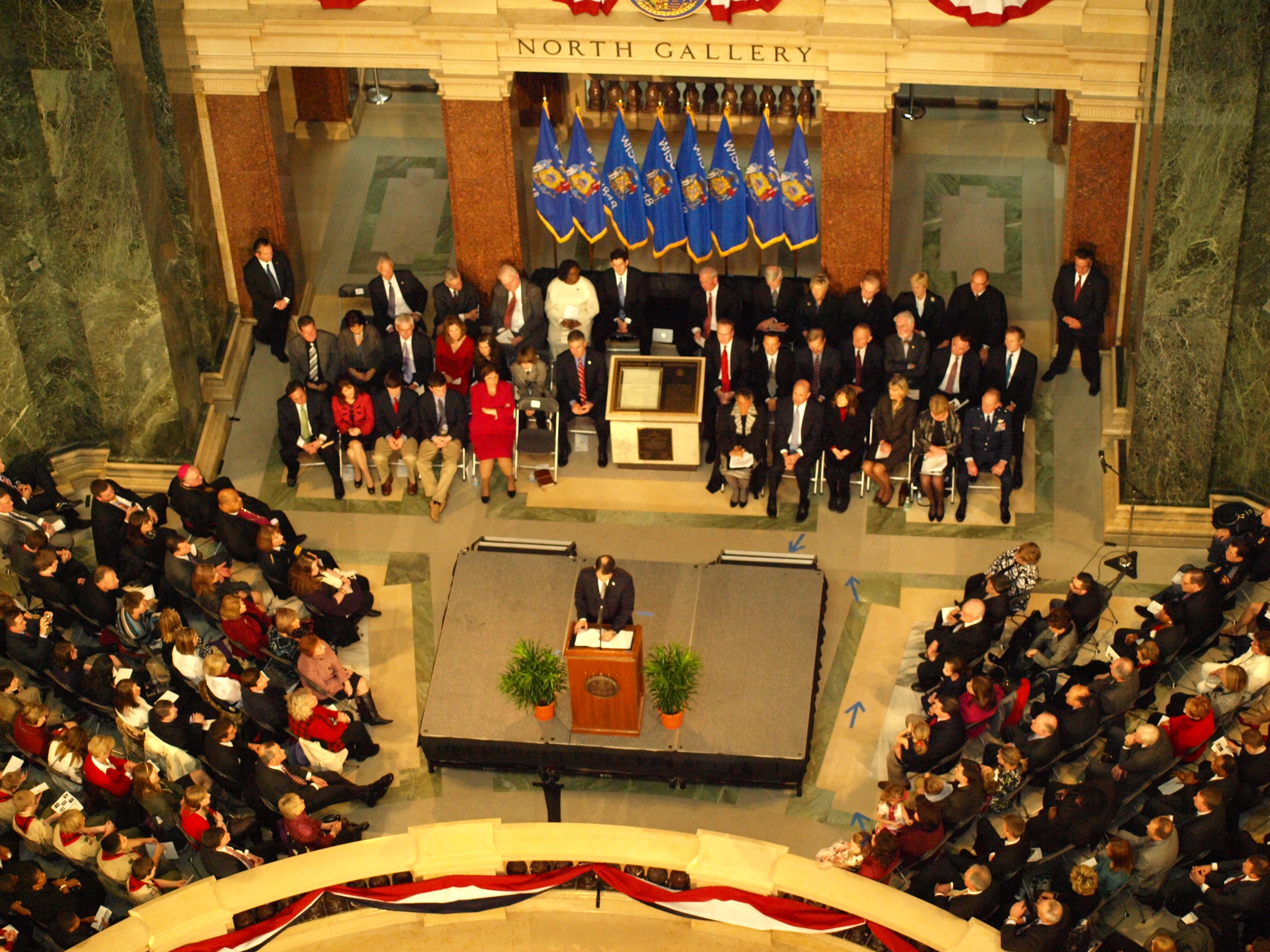
Walker's gubernatorial inauguration

2010 Wisconsin gubernatorial election
Party	Candidate	Votes	%	±%
Republican	Scott Walker	1,128,941	52.25%	+6.94%
Democratic	Tom Barrett	1,004,303	46.48%	−6.22%
Independent	Jim Langer	10,608	0.49%	
Common Sense	James James	8,273	0.38%	
Libertarian	No Candidate (Note: The Libertarian Party had no candidate for governor in 2010, although Terry Virgil ran on the party ticket for lieutenant governor.)	6,790	0.31%	
Independent	Patricia Messicci (write-in)	22	0.00%	
Independent	Leslie Ervin Smetak (write-in)	19	0.00%	
Independent	Hari Trivedi (write-in)	18	0.00%	
	Scattering	1,858	0.09%	
Majority		124,638	5.77%	
Total votes		2,160,832	100.00%	
Republican gain from Democratic		Swing	+13.16%	

==== By county ====
County	Scott Walker Republican		Tom Barrett Democratic		All Others Various		Margin		Total votes cast
County	#	%	#	%	#	%	#	%	Total votes cast
Adams	3,748	52.27%	3,298	46.00%	124	1.73%	450	6.28%	7,170
Ashland	2,205	37.07%	3,664	61.59%	80	1.34%	-1,459	-24.53%	5,949
Barron	8,486	54.68%	6,746	43.47%	288	1.86%	1,740	11.21%	15,520
Bayfield	2,961	40.89%	4,185	57.79%	96	1.33%	-1,224	-16.90%	7,242
Brown	49,567	56.08%	37,549	42.48%	1,274	1.44%	12,018	13.60%	88,390
Buffalo	2,610	53.49%	2,174	44.56%	95	1.95%	436	8.94%	4,879
Burnett	3,479	56.86%	2,555	41.76%	85	1.39%	924	15.10%	6,119
Calumet	11,152	60.26%	7,065	38.18%	288	1.56%	4,087	22.09%	18,505
Chippewa	11,901	56.25%	8,753	41.37%	504	2.38%	3,148	14.88%	21,158
Clark	6,368	60.62%	3,844	36.59%	293	2.79%	2,524	24.03%	10,505
Columbia	11,059	51.71%	10,014	46.83%	312	1.46%	1,045	4.89%	21,385
Crawford	2,792	46.84%	3,062	51.37%	107	1.80%	-270	-4.53%	5,961
Dane	68,238	30.98%	149,699	67.96%	2,336	1.06%	-81,461	-36.98%	220,273
Dodge	20,568	66.06%	10,138	32.56%	427	1.37%	10,430	33.50%	31,133
Door	6,932	49.98%	6,719	48.44%	219	1.58%	213	1.54%	13,870
Douglas	6,255	41.17%	8,703	57.28%	235	1.55%	-2,448	-16.11%	15,193
Dunn	7,282	53.71%	5,972	44.05%	304	2.24%	1,310	9.66%	13,558
Eau Claire	18,018	48.52%	18,454	49.70%	661	1.78%	-436	-1.17%	37,133
Florence	1,197	65.30%	612	33.39%	24	1.31%	585	31.91%	1,833
Fond du Lac	24,407	64.30%	13,145	34.63%	405	1.07%	11,262	29.67%	37,957
Forest	1,790	52.65%	1,565	46.03%	45	1.32%	225	6.62%	3,400
Grant	8,611	52.21%	7,573	45.91%	310	1.88%	1,038	6.29%	16,494
Green	6,391	48.46%	6,567	49.80%	229	1.74%	-176	-1.33%	13,187
Green Lake	4,488	64.28%	2,262	32.40%	232	3.32%	2,226	31.88%	6,982
Iowa	3,867	44.21%	4,750	54.31%	129	1.47%	-883	-10.10%	8,746
Iron	1,336	53.38%	1,139	45.51%	28	1.12%	197	7.87%	2,503
Jackson	3,428	50.59%	3,219	47.51%	129	1.90%	209	3.08%	6,776
Jefferson	19,155	60.75%	11,909	37.77%	466	1.48%	7,246	22.98%	31,530
Juneau	4,502	56.36%	3,358	42.04%	128	1.60%	1,144	14.32%	7,988
Kenosha	25,136	51.29%	23,312	47.57%	562	1.15%	1,824	3.72%	49,010
Kewaunee	4,577	56.69%	3,345	41.43%	152	1.88%	1,232	15.26%	8,074
La Crosse	20,754	49.32%	20,639	49.05%	684	1.63%	115	0.27%	42,077
Lafayette	2,926	52.31%	2,566	45.87%	102	1.82%	360	6.44%	5,594
Langlade	4,481	61.17%	2,754	37.60%	90	1.23%	1,727	23.58%	7,325
Lincoln	6,201	54.73%	4,872	43.00%	258	2.28%	1,329	11.73%	11,331
Manitowoc	18,234	60.03%	11,784	38.80%	357	1.18%	6,450	21.23%	30,375
Marathon	28,516	57.59%	20,028	40.45%	970	1.96%	8,488	17.14%	49,514
Marinette	8,222	56.49%	6,127	42.09%	207	1.42%	2,095	14.39%	14,556
Marquette	3,483	58.05%	2,384	39.73%	133	2.22%	1,099	18.32%	6,000
Menominee	166	22.07%	586	77.93%	0	0.00%	-420	-55.85%	752
Milwaukee	128,612	37.71%	209,932	61.56%	2,473	0.73%	-81,320	-23.85%	341,017
Monroe	7,570	57.83%	5,199	39.72%	320	2.44%	2,371	18.11%	13,089
Oconto	8,131	59.35%	5,380	39.27%	189	1.38%	2,751	20.08%	13,700
Oneida	8,773	55.29%	6,762	42.62%	331	2.09%	2,011	12.67%	15,866
Outagamie	35,143	53.85%	29,223	44.78%	893	1.37%	5,920	9.07%	65,259
Ozaukee	29,879	68.88%	13,233	30.50%	269	0.62%	16,646	38.37%	43,381
Pepin	1,279	53.14%	1,093	45.41%	35	1.45%	186	7.73%	2,407
Pierce	7,067	53.10%	5,925	44.52%	316	2.37%	1,142	8.58%	13,308
Polk	8,842	59.37%	5,752	38.62%	298	2.00%	3,090	20.75%	14,892
Portage	12,794	46.23%	14,463	52.26%	420	1.52%	-1,669	-6.03%	27,677
Price	3,284	52.21%	2,858	45.44%	148	2.35%	426	6.77%	6,290
Racine	40,813	56.07%	31,333	43.05%	645	0.89%	9,480	13.02%	72,791
Richland	3,293	52.72%	2,866	45.89%	87	1.39%	427	6.84%	6,246
Rock	23,813	45.61%	27,424	52.52%	976	1.87%	-3,611	-6.92%	52,213
Rusk	3,045	56.37%	2,170	40.17%	187	3.46%	875	16.20%	5,402
Sauk	11,044	49.82%	10,741	48.46%	381	1.72%	303	1.37%	22,166
Sawyer	3,766	57.97%	2,650	40.79%	81	1.25%	1,116	17.18%	6,497
Shawano	8,663	60.27%	5,487	38.18%	223	1.55%	3,176	22.10%	14,373
Sheboygan	29,657	63.27%	16,720	35.67%	497	1.06%	12,937	27.60%	46,874
St. Croix	17,298	61.48%	10,329	36.71%	510	1.81%	6,969	24.77%	28,137
Taylor	4,212	62.17%	2,370	34.98%	193	2.85%	1,842	27.19%	6,775
Trempealeau	4,898	48.88%	4,928	49.18%	195	1.95%	-30	-0.30%	10,021
Vernon	5,441	49.78%	5,278	48.29%	211	1.93%	163	1.49%	10,930
Vilas	6,595	62.58%	3,773	35.80%	171	1.62%	2,822	26.78%	10,539
Walworth	22,733	64.73%	11,870	33.80%	516	1.47%	10,863	30.93%	35,119
Washburn	3,533	53.43%	2,974	44.98%	105	1.59%	559	8.45%	6,612
Washington	44,222	74.99%	14,276	24.21%	475	0.81%	29,946	50.78%	58,973
Waukesha	134,608	71.49%	52,684	27.98%	986	0.52%	81,924	43.51%	188,278
Waupaca	10,596	59.12%	7,072	39.46%	256	1.43%	3,524	19.66%	17,924
Waushara	5,178	60.11%	3,284	38.12%	152	1.76%	1,894	21.99%	8,614
Winnebago	33,044	53.96%	27,141	44.32%	1,056	1.72%	5,903	9.64%	61,241
Wood	15,626	55.27%	12,023	42.52%	625	2.21%	3,603	12.74%	28,274
Total	1,128,941	52.25%	1,004,303	46.48%	27,588	1.28%	124,638	5.77%	2,160,832

Counties that flipped Democratic to Republican

- Adams (largest city: Adams)
- Barron (largest city: Rice Lake)
- Buffalo (largest city: Mondovi)
- Burnett (largest village: Grantsburg)
- Chippewa (largest city: Chippewa Falls)
- Clark (largest city: Neillsville)
- Columbia (largest city: Portage)
- Door (largest city: Sturgeon Bay)
- Dunn (largest city: Menomonie)
- Forest (largest city: Crandon)
- Grant (largest city: Platteville)
- Iron (largest city: Hurley)
- Jackson (largest city: Black River Falls)
- Kenosha (largest city: Kenosha)
- La Crosse (largest city: La Crosse)
- Lafayette (largest city: Darlington)
- Lincoln (largest city: Merrill)
- Marathon (largest city: Wausau)
- Monroe (largest city: Sparta)
- Oneida (largest city: Rhinelander)
- Outagamie (largest city: Appleton)
- Pepin (largest city: Durand)
- Pierce (largest city: River Falls)
- Polk (largest city: Amery)
- Price (largest city: Park Falls)
- Richland (largest city: Richland Center)
- Rusk (largest city: Ladysmith)
- Sauk (largest city: Baraboo)
- Sawyer (largest city: Hayward)
- St. Croix (largest city: Hudson)
- Vernon (largest city: Viroqua)
- Washburn (largest city: Spooner)
- Winnebago (largest city: Oshkosh)
- Wood (largest city: Wisconsin Rapids)
