= 1998 United States Senate election in Wisconsin =

- November 3, 1998
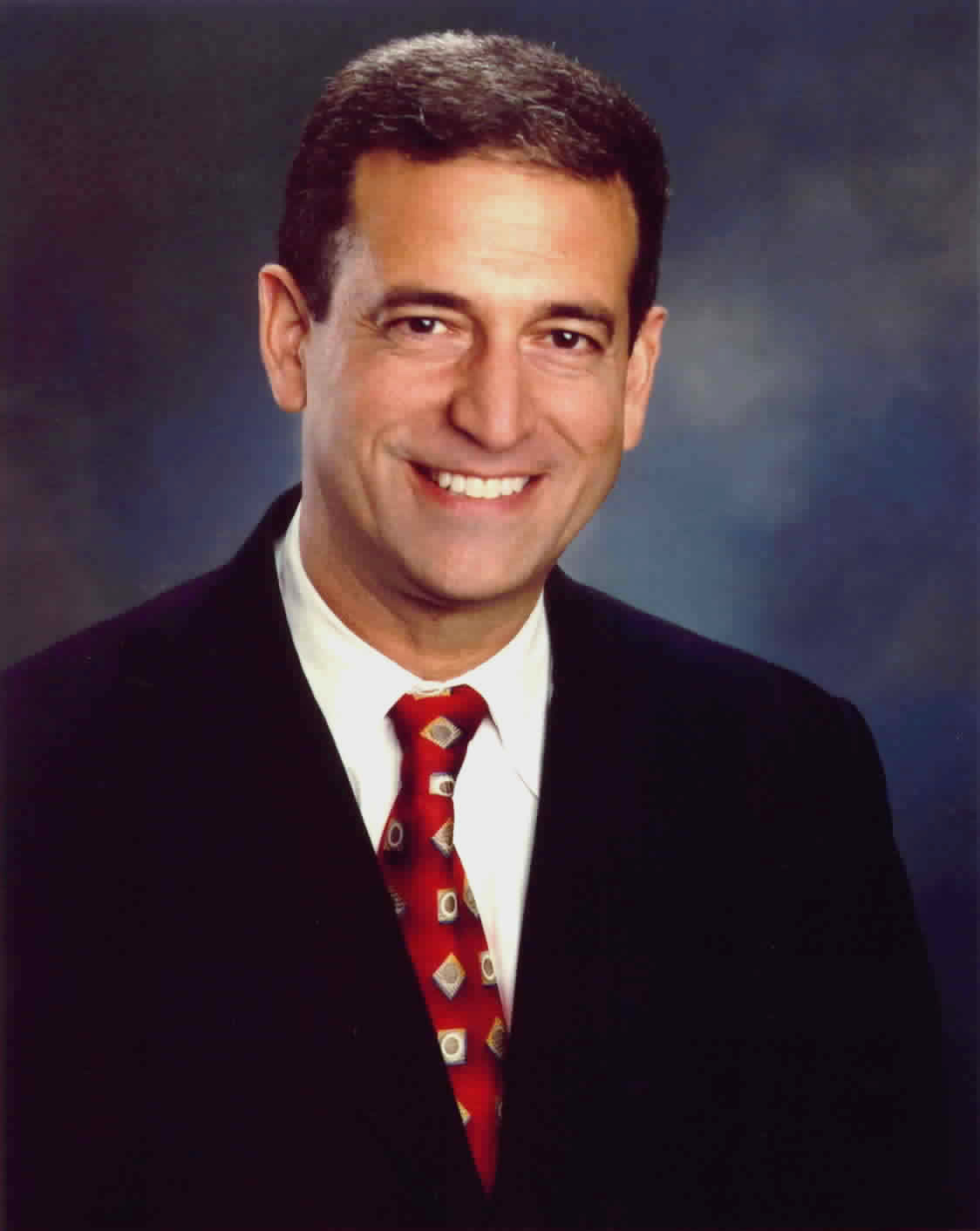

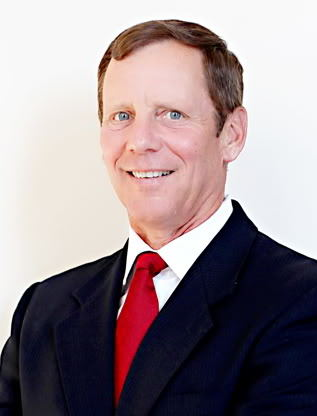
Nominee	Russ Feingold	Mark Neumann
Party	Democratic	Republican
Popular vote	890,059	852,272
Percentage	50.55%	48.40%
- Feingold: 40–50% 50–60% 60–70% 70–80% 80–90% >90% Neumann: 40–50% 50–60% 60–70% 70–80% 80–90% >90% Tie
U.S. senator before election
Russ Feingold
Democratic
Elected U.S. Senator
Russ Feingold
Democratic

The 1998 United States Senate election in Wisconsin was held November 3, 1998. Incumbent Democratic U.S. Senator Russ Feingold won re-election to a second term.

== General election ==
=== Candidates ===
- Tom Ender (Libertarian)
- Russ Feingold, incumbent U.S. senator since 1993 (Democratic)
- Eugene A. Hem, former educator (Independent)
- Mark Neumann, U.S. representative from Milton (Republican)
- Robert R. Raymond (U.S. Taxpayers)

=== Campaign ===
In September 1997, Neumann announced his candidacy for the United States Senate against Russ Feingold. Both candidates had similar views on the budget surplus, although Neumann was for banning partial-birth abortion while Feingold was against a ban. Both candidates limited themselves to $3.8 million in campaign spending ($1 for every citizen of Wisconsin), although outside groups spent more than $2 million on Neumann; Feingold refused to have outside groups spend their own 'soft money' on his behalf. Feingold defeated Neumann by a slim 2% margin in the election. According to the Milwaukee Journal-Sentinel, Neumann had a 30,000 vote margin outside Milwaukee County, but was overwhelmed by a 68,000 vote margin in Milwaukee County.

=== Polling ===
Poll source	Date(s)	Sample size (Note: Key: A – all adults RV – registered voters LV – likely voters V – unclear)	Margin of error	Russ Feingold (D)	Mark Neumann (R)	Other / undecided (Note: Calculated by taking the difference of 100% and all other candidates combined.)
Market Shares Corporation (Note: Poll sponsored by WTMJ-TV)	October 21–24, 1998	600 (LV)	± 4.0%	46%	43%	11%
FM3 Research (D) (Note: Poll conducted for Russ Feingold.)	October 22, 1998	599	—	44%	43%	13%
St. Norbert College Survey Center (Note: Poll sponsored by the Green Bay News-Chronicle & Wisconsin Public Radio)	October 8–20, 1998	415 (LV)	± 4.8%	47%	40%	13%
University of Wisconsin–Milwaukee	October 15, 1998	286	—	46%	44%	10%
Journal Sentinel Research and Public Policy Forum	October 2–9, 1998	314 (LV)	± 6.0%	50%	43%	7%
WISC-TV/Wisconsin State Journal	August 7–26, 1998	271 (LV)	± 5.9%	54%	30%	16%
Louis Harris & Associates	July 7–18, 1998	1,000 (A)	± 3.0%	49%	30%	21%
WISC-TV/Wisconsin State Journal	May, 1998	403 (A)	± 5.0%	42%	31%	27%
St. Norbert College Survey Center (Note: Poll sponsored by Wisconsin Public Radio)	February 17 – March 24, 1998	400 (LV)	± 5.0%	65%	23%	12%
Journal Sentinel Research and Public Policy Forum	February, 1998	497 (LV)	± 4.5%	56%	29%	15%
St. Norbert College Survey Center	Fall, 1997	417 (LV)	± 5.0%	51%	29%	20%

=== Results ===
General election results
Party	Candidate	Votes	%
Democratic	Russ Feingold (incumbent)	890,059	50.55%
Republican	Mark Neumann	852,272	48.40%
U.S. Taxpayers	Robert R. Raymond	7,942	0.45%
Libertarian	Tom Ender	5,591	0.32%
Independent	Eugene A. Hem	4,266	0.24%
Write-in		706	0.04%
Total votes		1,760,836	100.00%
Democratic hold			

== See also ==
- 1998 United States Senate elections
- 1998 Wisconsin gubernatorial election

== Notes ==
Partisan clients
