= Kurt W. Schuller =

American politician and restaurateur

Kurt Schuller

34th Treasurer of Wisconsin
- In office January 3, 2011 – January 3, 2015
- Governor: Scott Walker
- Preceded by: Dawn Marie Sass
- Succeeded by: Matt Adamczyk

Personal details
- Born: June 21, 1955 (age 71) Milwaukee, Wisconsin, U.S.
- Party: Republican
- Education: Concordia University Wisconsin

Kurt W. Schuller (born June 21, 1955) is the former State Treasurer of Wisconsin and a restaurateur from Eden, Wisconsin.

== Biography ==
Born in Milwaukee, Wisconsin, Schuller graduated from Concordia University Wisconsin with an associate degree in management and communications. Schuller owned and managed restaurants and lives in Eden. He worked for 20 years as a chef, became the general manager of The Club Forest Restaurant, owned and operated Wolfendale's Restaurant in Sussex from 1996 to 2005, and worked for Old Country Buffet. On November 2, 2010, he defeated incumbent Democrat Dawn Marie Sass for the office of the State Treasurer of Wisconsin. Schuller pledged to serve one term in office and to work for the abolition of the office.

== Wisconsin 2014 elections ==
In March 2014, he announced that he was not running for re-election. He was instead running for a seat on the Fond du Lac County Board of Supervisors. In the Wisconsin Spring Election 2014, Schuller was defeated in his race for the board.

Party political offices
| Preceded by Jack Voight | Republican nominee for State Treasurer of Wisconsin; 2010 | Succeeded by Matt Adamczyk |
| Preceded by Dawn Marie Sass | State Treasurer of Wisconsin; 2011 – 2015 | Succeeded by Matt Adamczyk |
