= Jack Voight =

American politician and businessman

32nd Treasurer of Wisconsin
- In office January 3, 1995 – January 3, 2007
- Governor: Tommy Thompson; Scott McCallum; Jim Doyle
- Preceded by: Cathy Zeuske
- Succeeded by: Dawn Marie Sass

Personal details
- Born: December 17, 1945 (age 80) New London, Wisconsin
- Party: Republican
- Education: University of Wisconsin–Oshkosh (BS)

Military service
- Branch/service: United States Army
- Years of service: 1968–1970

Jack C. Voight (born December 17, 1945) is an American politician and businessman who served as the 32nd State Treasurer of Wisconsin from 1995 to 2007. He is a member of the Republican Party.

== Early life and career ==
Born and raised in New London, Wisconsin, Voight received his Bachelor of Science degree from the University of Wisconsin–Oshkosh in 1971.

== Career ==
After serving as a sergeant in the United States Army from 1968 to 1970, he moved to Appleton, Wisconsin, where he established an insurance agency. Voight served on the Appleton City Council from 1983 to 1993, holding the position of council president from 1992 to 1993.

When incumbent Treasurer Cathy Zeuske ran in the Republican primary for United States Senate in 1994, Voight ran as the Republican nominee to replace her. He was elected that year, and re-elected in 1998 and 2002.

Voight was defeated for re-election on November 7, 2006, by Democrat Dawn Marie Sass, a former parole officer and AFSCME union activist, then working as a clerk at the department store Boston Store, in what was considered an upset. Voight had defeated Sass in both 1998 and 2002, and Sass said she spent less than $4,000 on the race, most out of her own pocket.

Voight held the position of president of the National Association of State Treasurers in 1997.

In May 2009, Voight announced his interest in seeking the Republican nomination for Lieutenant Governor of Wisconsin in 2010, but instead, the following June, Voight announced he was going to run to replace retiring Outagamie County Executive Toby Paltzer. On April 5, 2011, he was defeated by former Assemblyman and unsuccessful Democratic nominee for Lieutenant Governor Tom Nelson, by roughly 52% - 48%. Voight blamed the political unrest stemming from Governor Scott Walker's policy drive to eliminate public workers' collective bargaining powers, saying "The labor movement has not only energized the Democratic Party base but a lot of the independents." In 2016, Voight was elected to serve as Outagamie County Treasurer. He resigned in 2017 due to health and medical concerns.

== Electoral history ==
2006 State Treasurer of Wisconsin election
Party	Candidate	Votes	%	±%
Democratic	Dawn Sass	969,115	47.36	
Republican	Jack Voight (inc.)	960,467	46.94	
Green	Winston Sephus	59,541	2.91	
Libertarian	Tim Peterson	57,063	2.79	

Party political offices
Preceded by Cathy Zeuske	Republican nominee for State Treasurer of Wisconsin; 1994, 1998, 2002, 2006	Succeeded by Kurt W. Schuller
Preceded by Cathy Zeuske	State Treasurer of Wisconsin; 1995–2007	Succeeded by Dawn Marie Sass
