= List of diplomatic missions of Luxembourg =

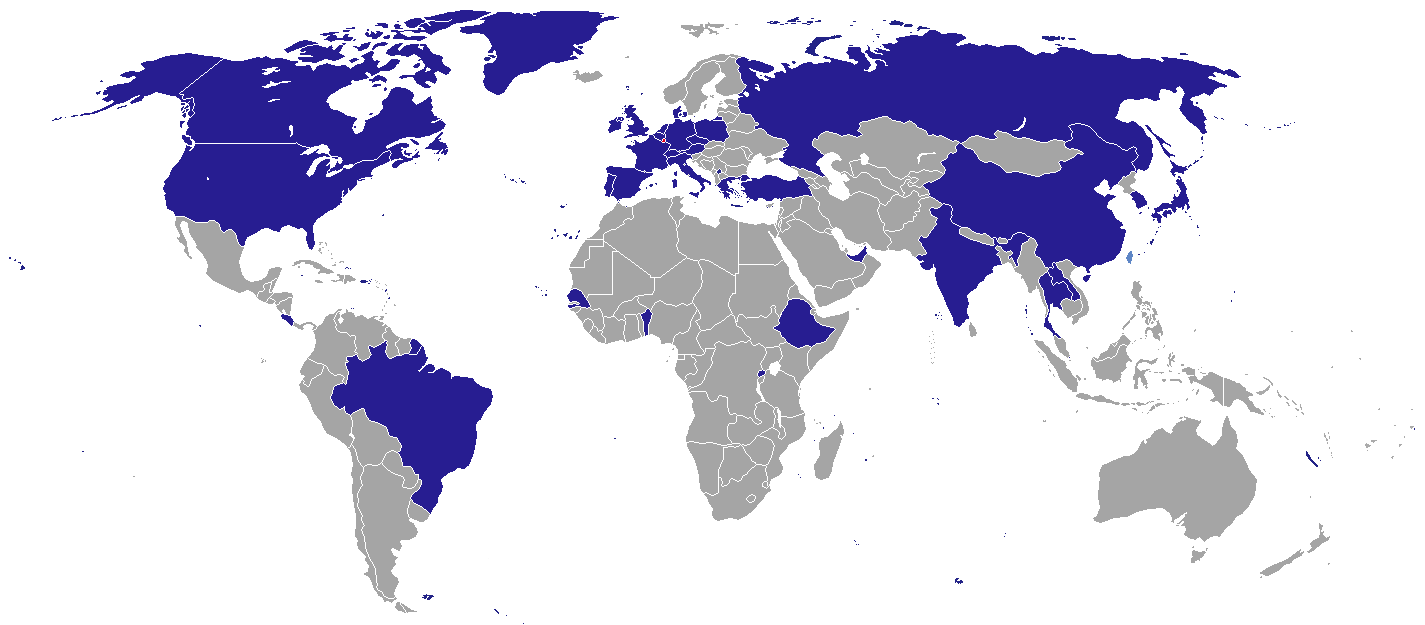
Countries with Luxembourg diplomatic missions

This is a list of diplomatic missions of Luxembourg.

Luxembourg is represented by either Belgium or the Netherlands in countries that do not host a Luxembourgish diplomatic mission.

Trade missions and honorary consulates are excluded from this listing.

== Current missions ==
=== Africa ===
Host country	Host city	Mission	Concurrent accreditation	Ref.
Benin	Cotonou	Embassy	Countries: Togo	
Cape Verde	Praia	Embassy		
Ethiopia	Addis Ababa	Embassy	International Organizations: African Union	
Rwanda	Kigali	Embassy		
Senegal	Dakar	Embassy	Countries: Mauritania	

=== Americas ===
Host country	Host city	Mission	Concurrent accreditation	Ref.
Brazil	Brasília	Embassy	Countries: Chile	
Canada	Ottawa	Embassy		
Costa Rica	San José	Embassy	Countries: El Salvador	
United States	Washington, D.C.	Embassy	Countries: Mexico; Nicaragua; International Organizations: Organization of American States (Note: Accredited as an observer mission.)	
United States	New York City	Consulate-General	Countries: Mexico; Nicaragua; International Organizations: Organization of American States	
United States	San Francisco	Consulate-General	Countries: Mexico; Nicaragua; International Organizations: Organization of American States	

=== Asia ===
Host country	Host city	Mission	Concurrent accreditation	Ref.
China	Beijing	Embassy	Countries: Mongolia; Pakistan	
China	Shanghai	Consulate-General	Countries: Mongolia; Pakistan	
India	New Delhi	Embassy	Countries: Bangladesh; Nepal; Sri Lanka	
Japan	Tokyo	Embassy	Countries: Philippines	
Laos	Vientiane	Embassy		
South Korea	Seoul	Embassy		
Taiwan	Taipei	Representative office		
Singapore	Singapore	Embassy		
Thailand	Bangkok	Embassy	Countries: Indonesia; Malaysia; Myanmar; Vietnam; International Organizations: Association of Southeast Asian Nations	
Turkey	Ankara	Embassy		
United Arab Emirates	Abu Dhabi	Embassy	Countries: Kuwait; International Organizations: International Renewable Energy Agency	

=== Europe ===
Host country	Host city	Mission	Concurrent accreditation	Ref.
Austria	Vienna	Embassy	Countries: Hungary; Slovakia; Slovenia; International Organizations: OSCE; United Nations	
Belgium	Brussels	Embassy		
Czech Republic	Prague	Embassy	Countries: Bulgaria; Estonia; Ukraine	
Denmark	Copenhagen	Embassy	Countries: Finland; Norway; Sweden	
France	Paris	Embassy	Countries: Monaco	
France	Strasbourg	Consulate-General	Countries: Monaco	
Germany	Berlin	Embassy		
Greece	Athens	Embassy	Countries: Cyprus; Romania	
Ireland	Dublin	Embassy		
Italy	Rome	Embassy	Countries: Croatia; Malta; San Marino; International Organizations: Food and Agriculture Organization; International Fund for Agricultural Development; World Food Programme	
Kosovo	Pristina	Embassy		
Netherlands	The Hague	Embassy		
Poland	Warsaw	Embassy	Countries: Latvia; Lithuania	
Portugal	Lisbon	Embassy		
Russia	Moscow	Embassy	Countries: Belarus; Kazakhstan	
Spain	Madrid	Embassy	Countries: Andorra	
Switzerland	Bern	Embassy	Countries: Liechtenstein	
United Kingdom	London	Embassy	Countries: Iceland; International Organizations: International Maritime Organization	

=== Multilateral organizations ===
- Brussels (Permanent Missions to the European Union and NATO)
- Geneva (Permanent Missions to the United Nations and other international organizations)
- Vienna (Permanent Mission to the United Nations and Permanent Mission to the OSCE)
- New York City (Permanent Mission to the United Nations)
- Paris (Permanent Missions to the Organisation for Economic Co-operation and Development and UNESCO)
- Strasbourg (Permanent Mission to the Council of Europe)

== Gallery ==
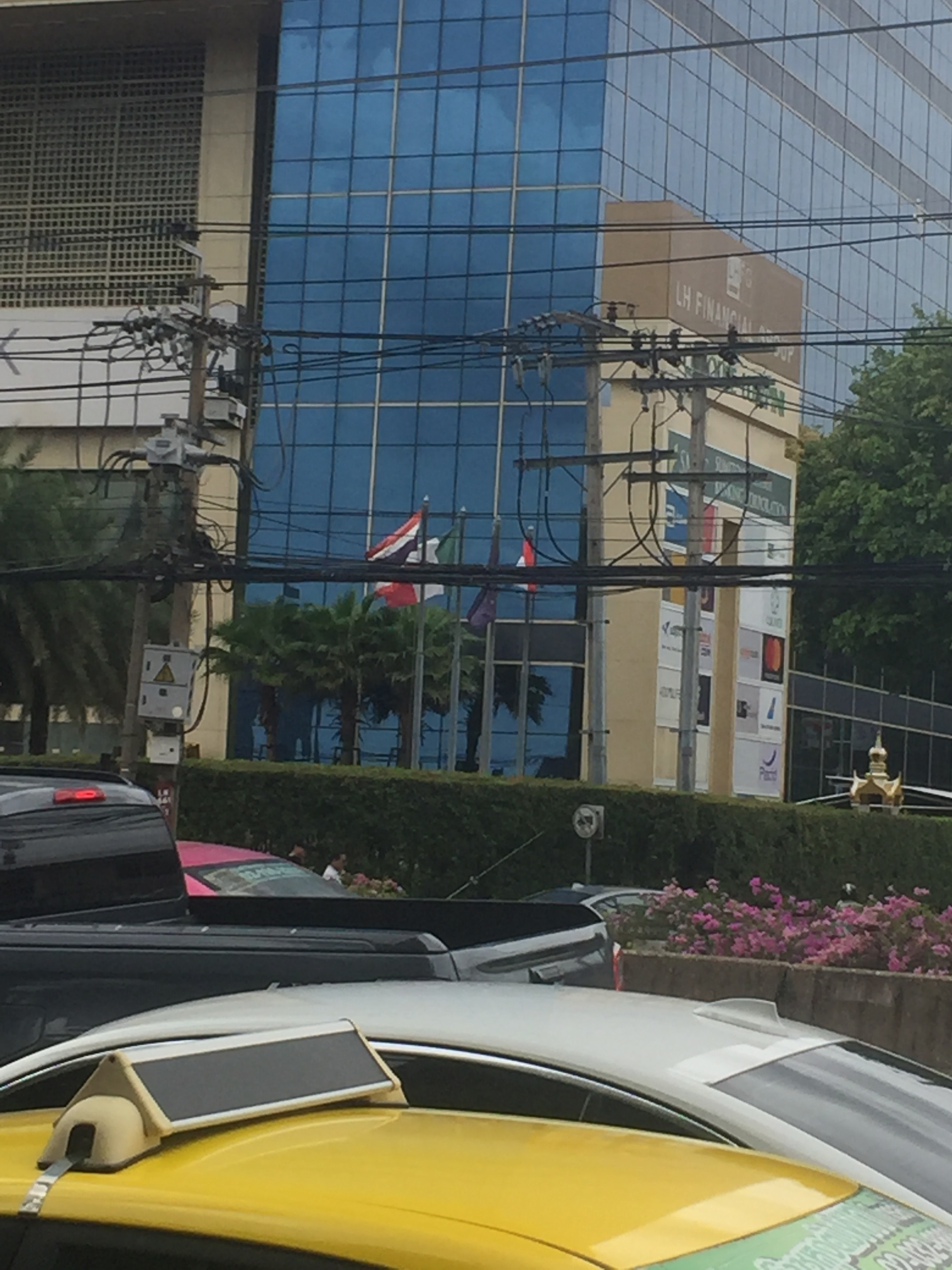
Building hosting the Embassy in Bangkok

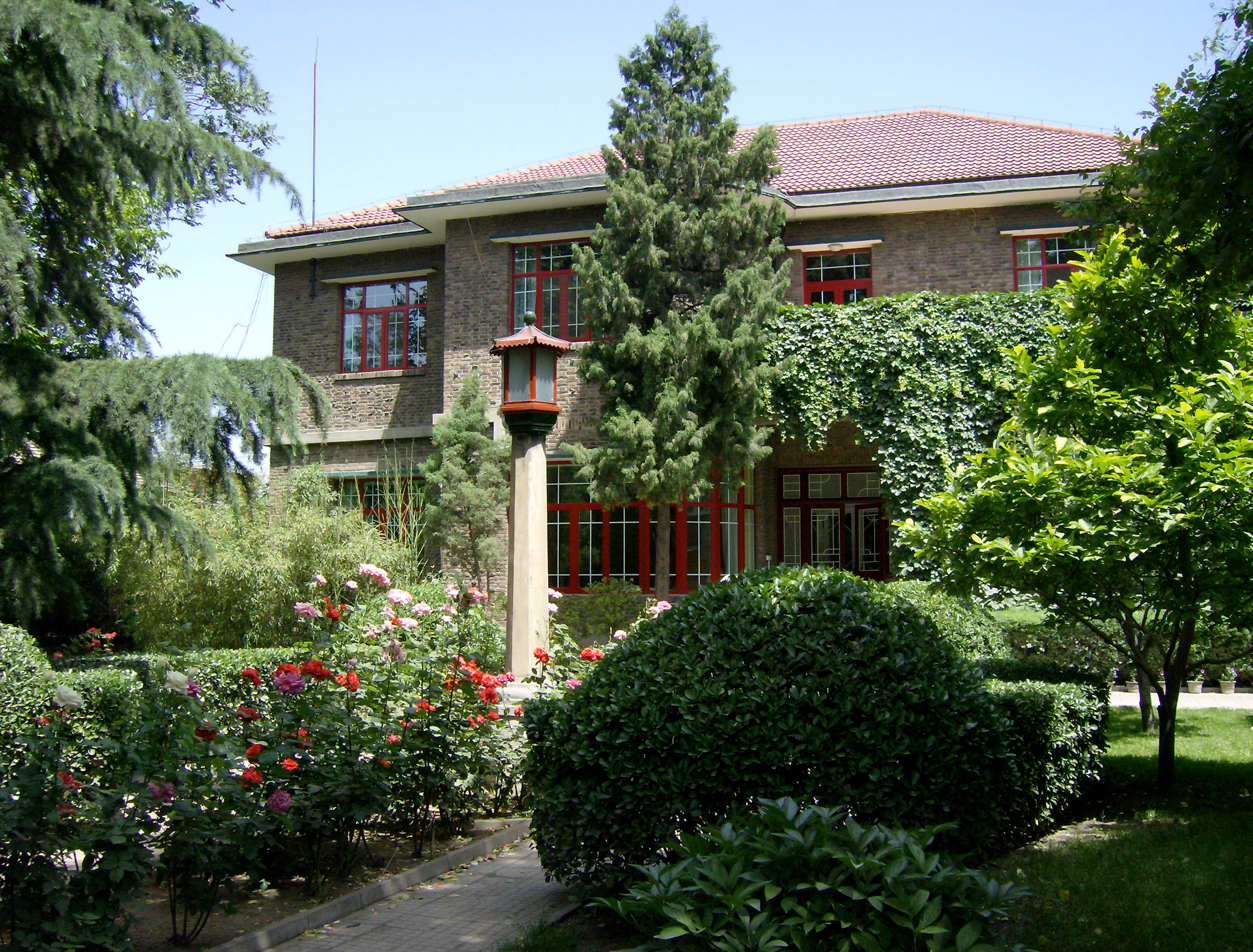
Embassy in Beijing

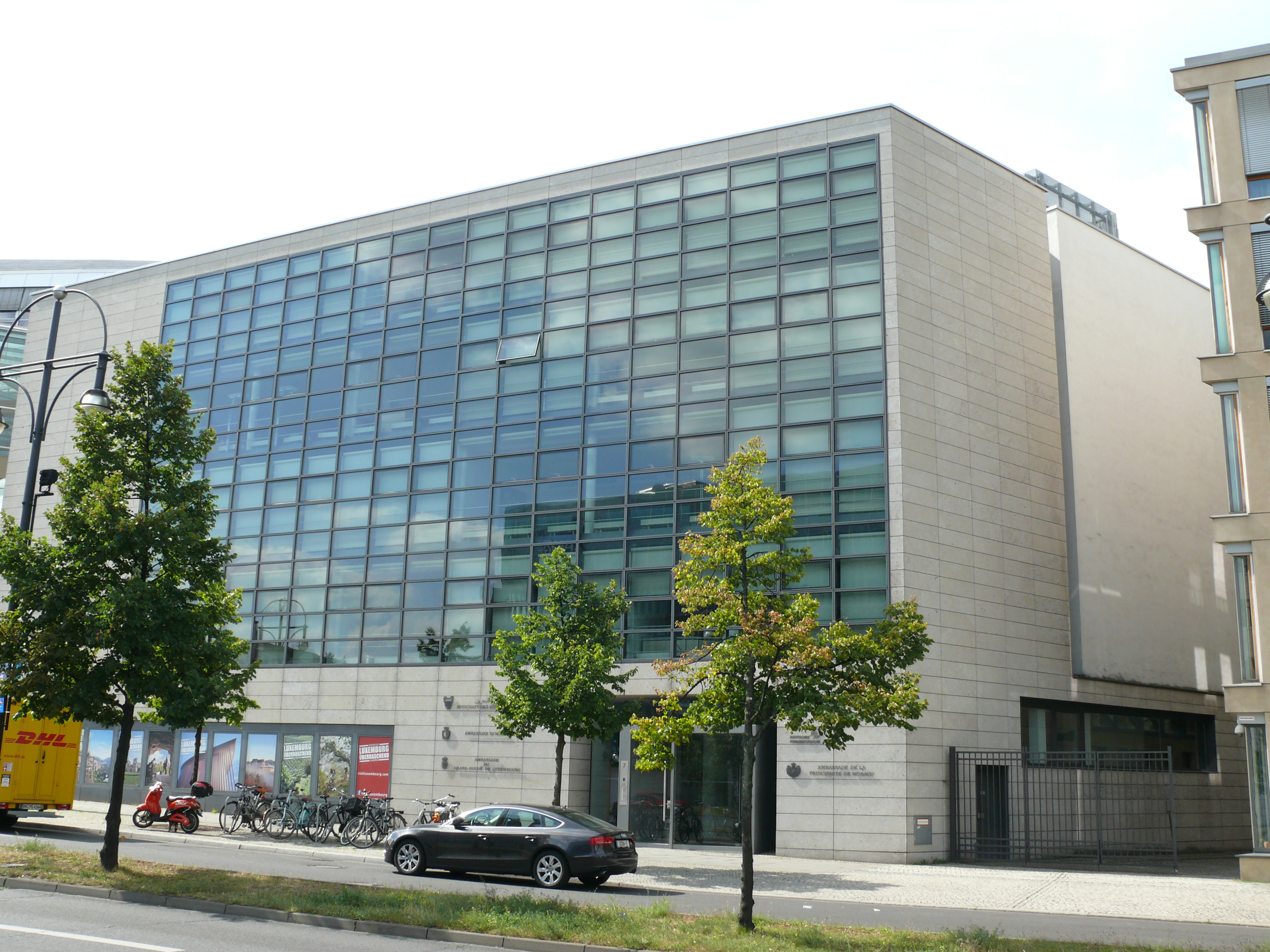
Building hosting the Embassy in Berlin

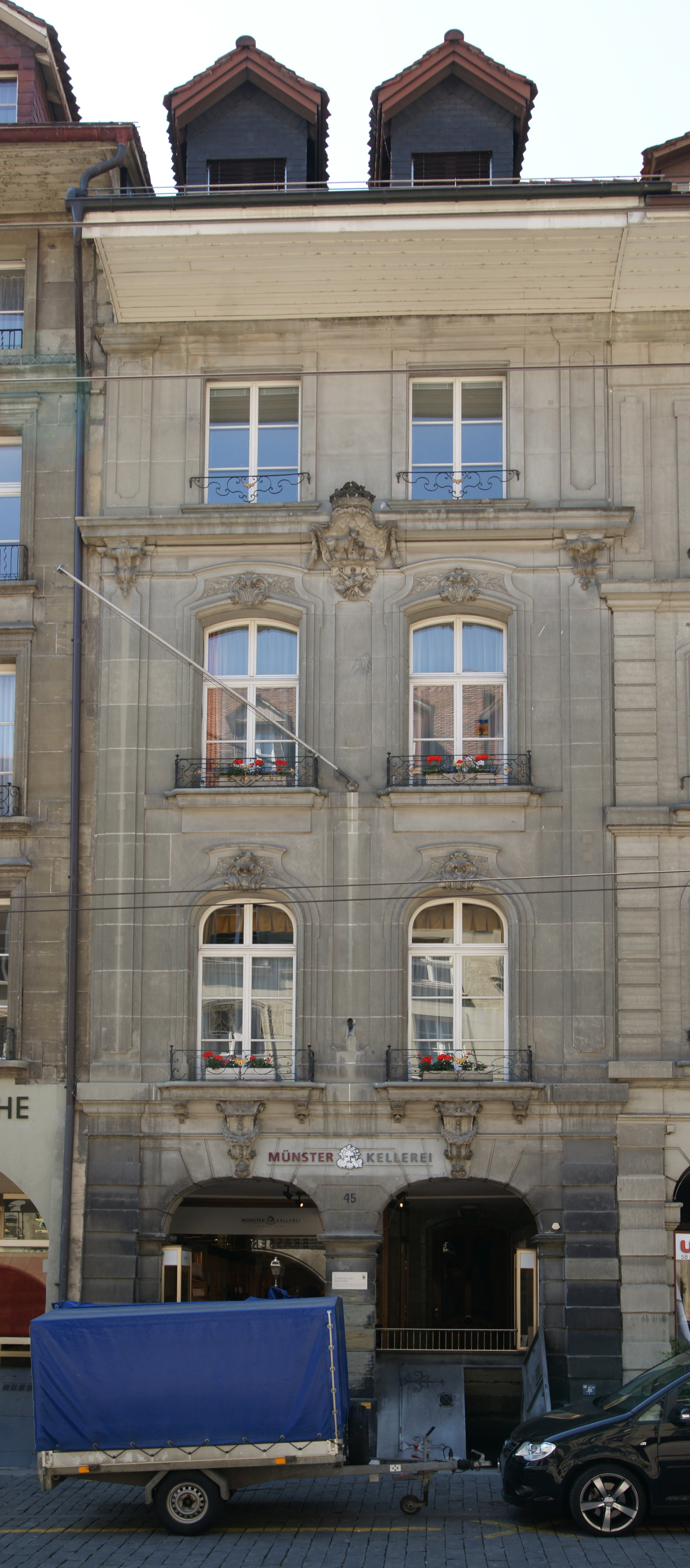
Embassy in Bern

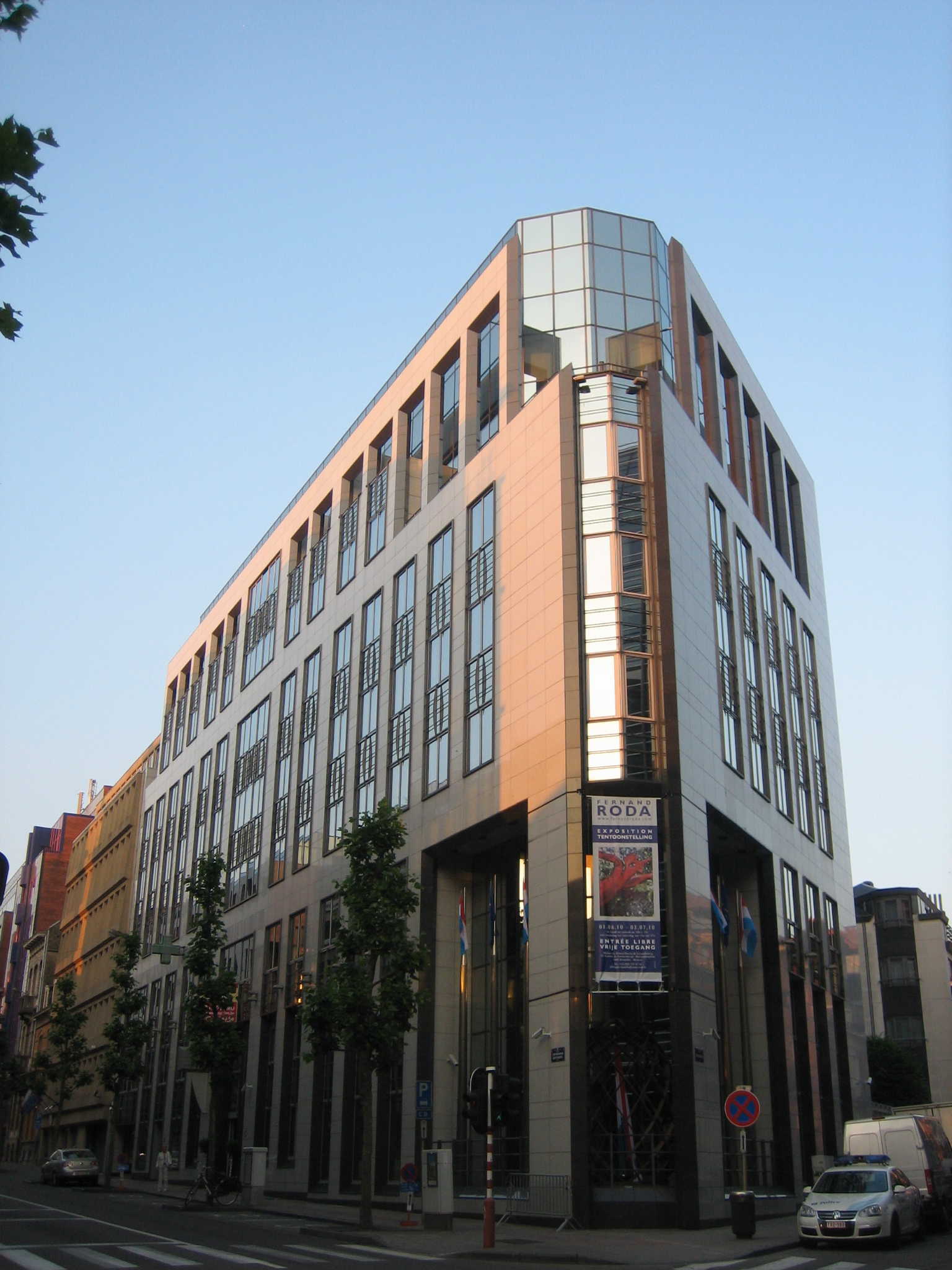
Embassy in Brussels

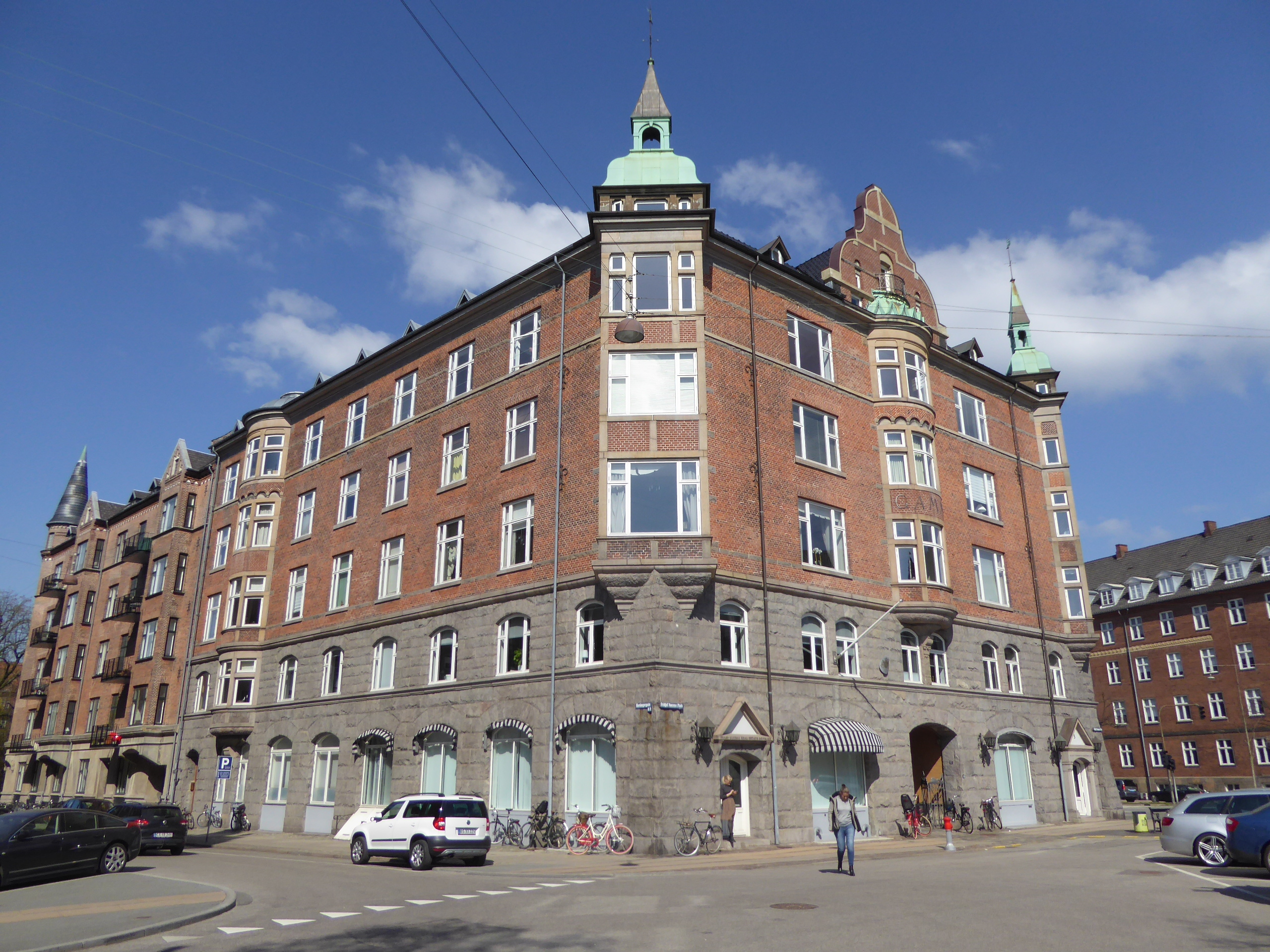
Embassy in Copenhagen

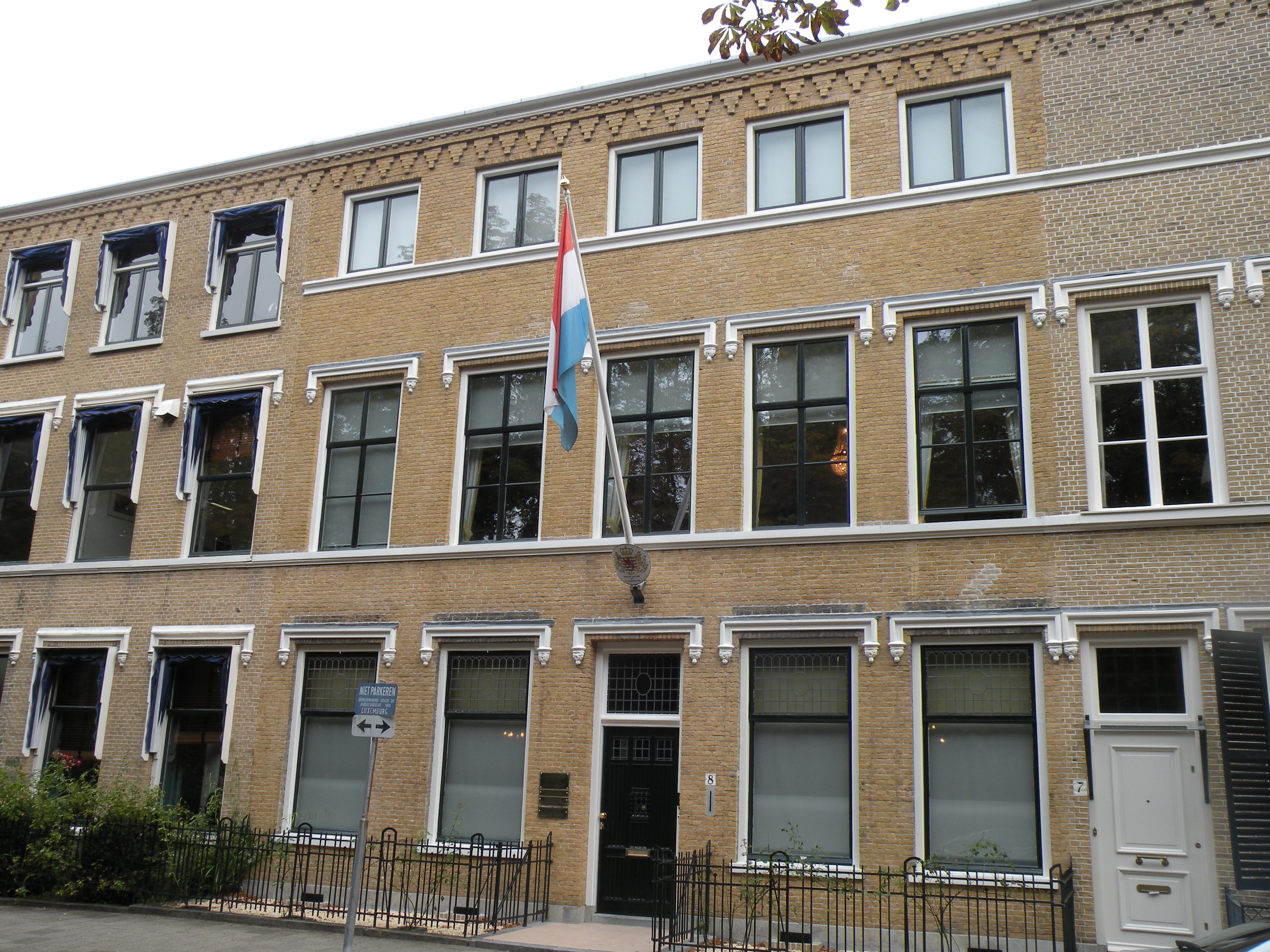
Embassy in The Hague

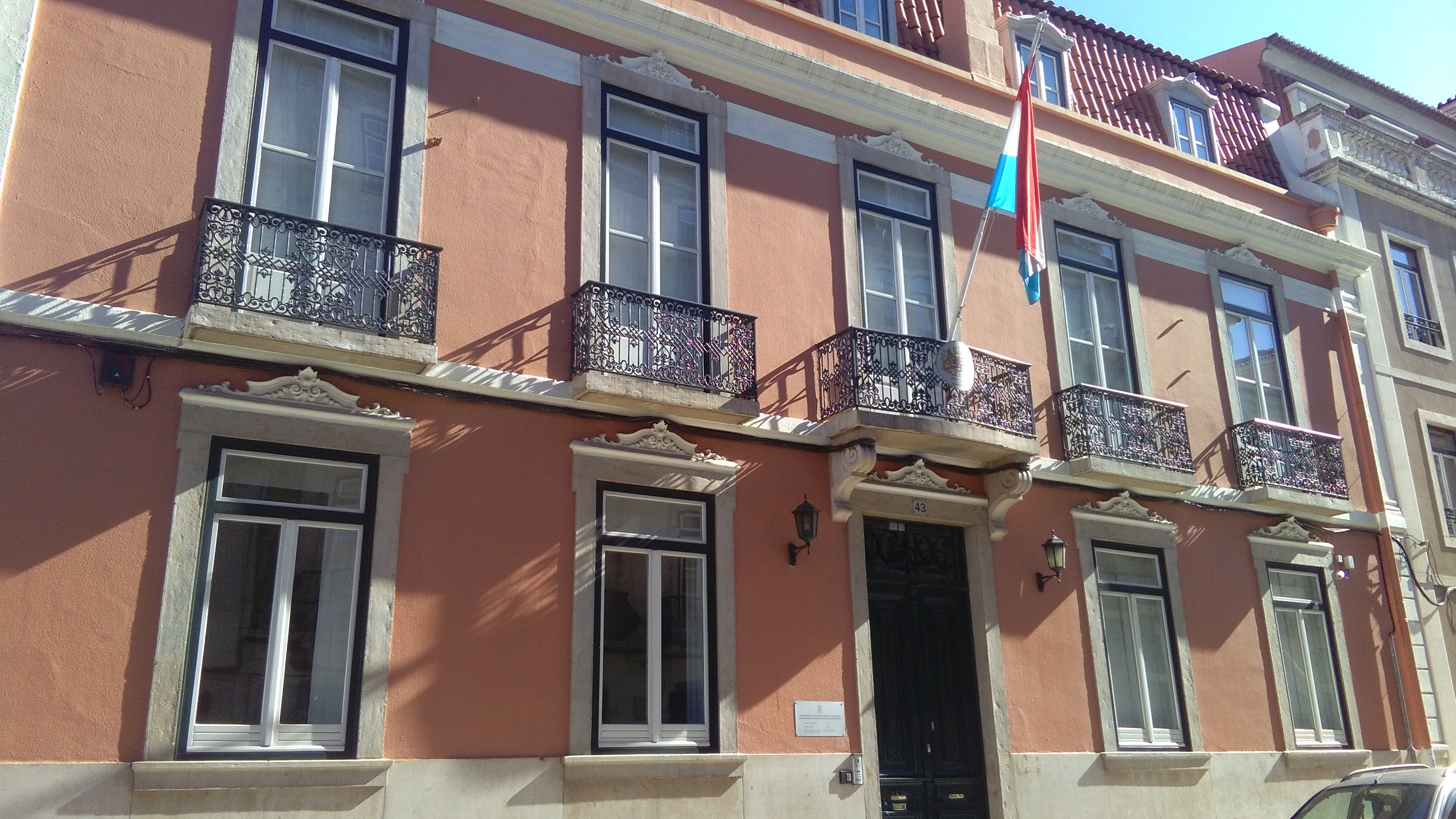
Embassy in Lisbon

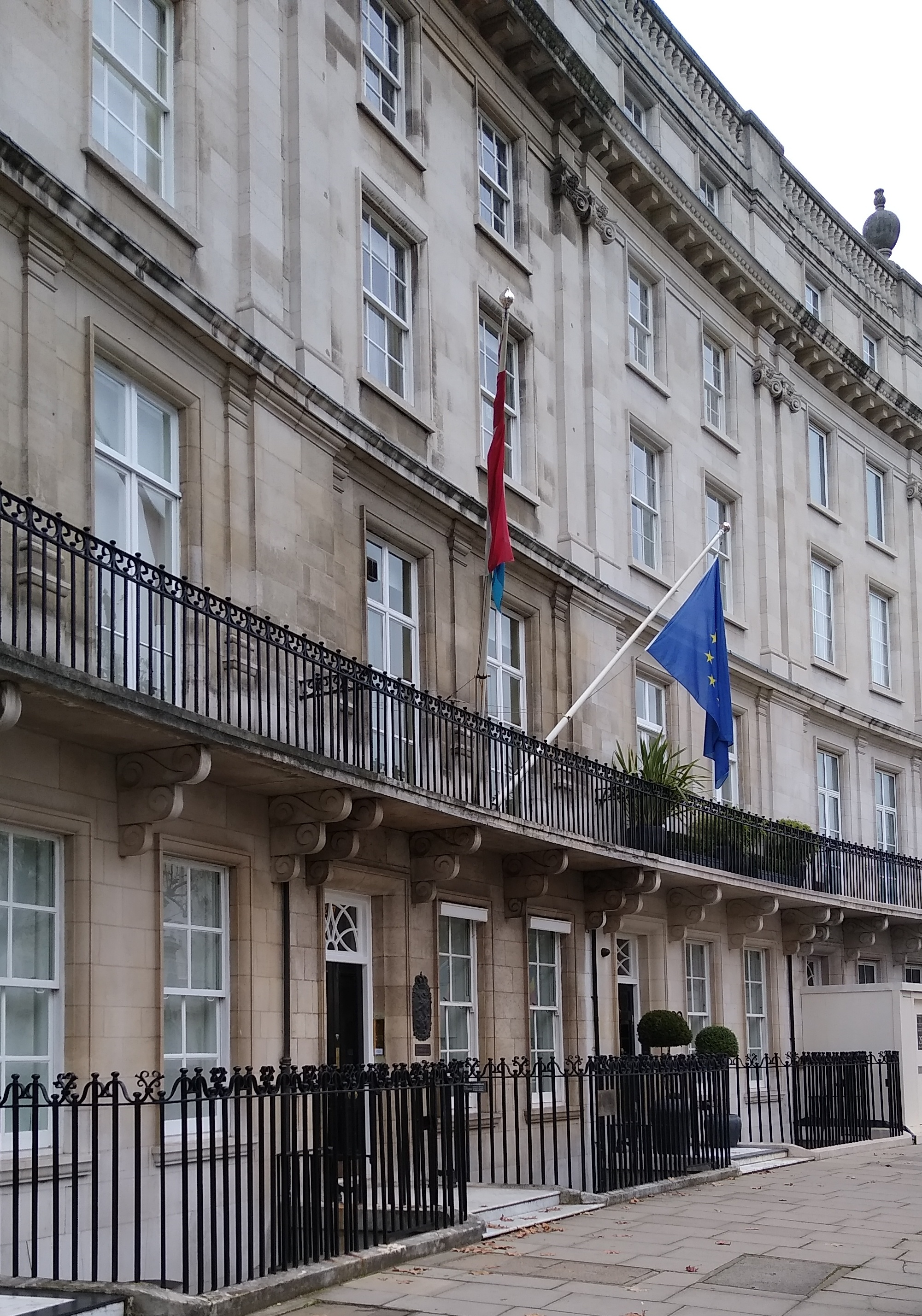
Embassy in London

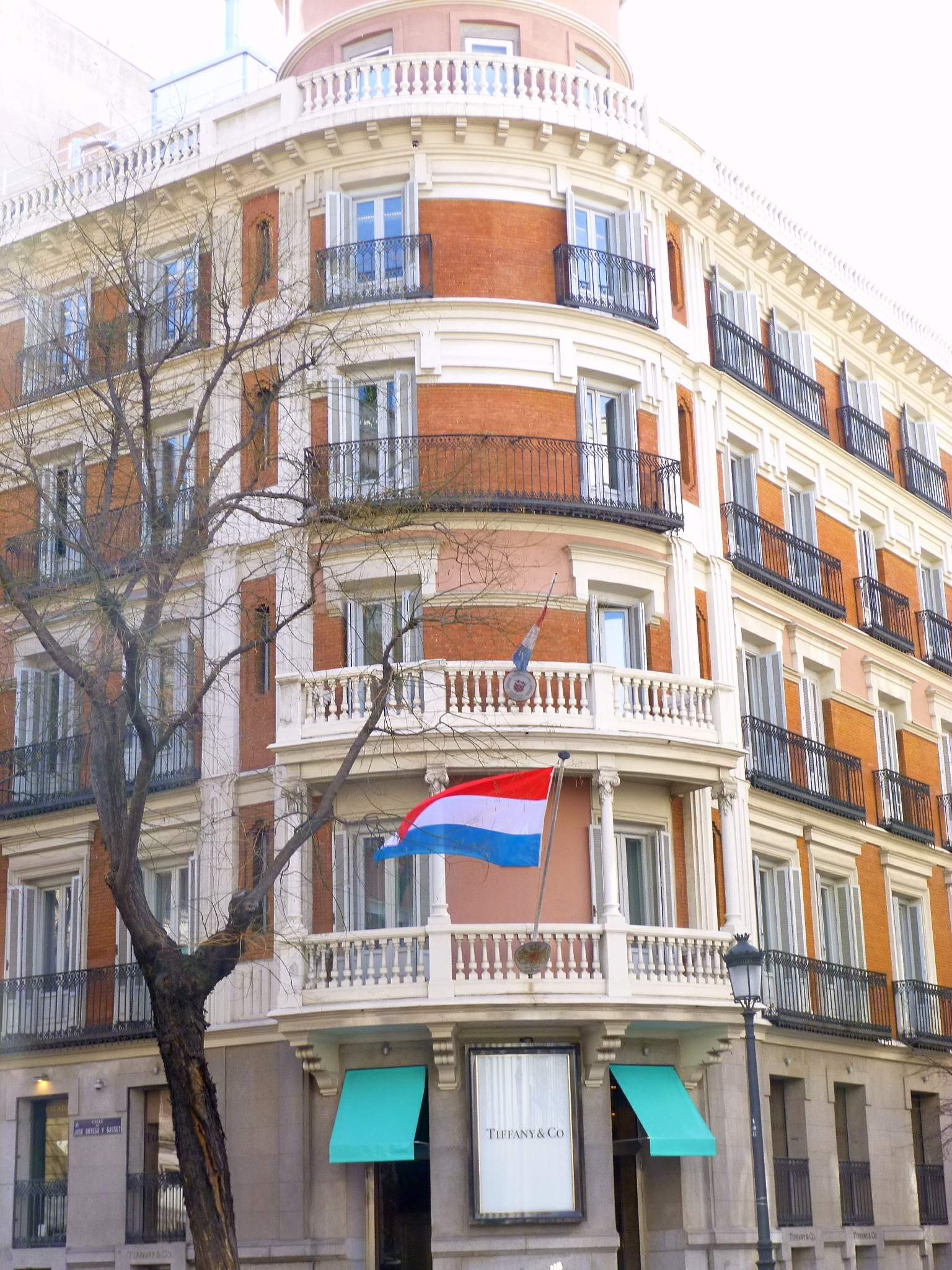
Embassy in Madrid

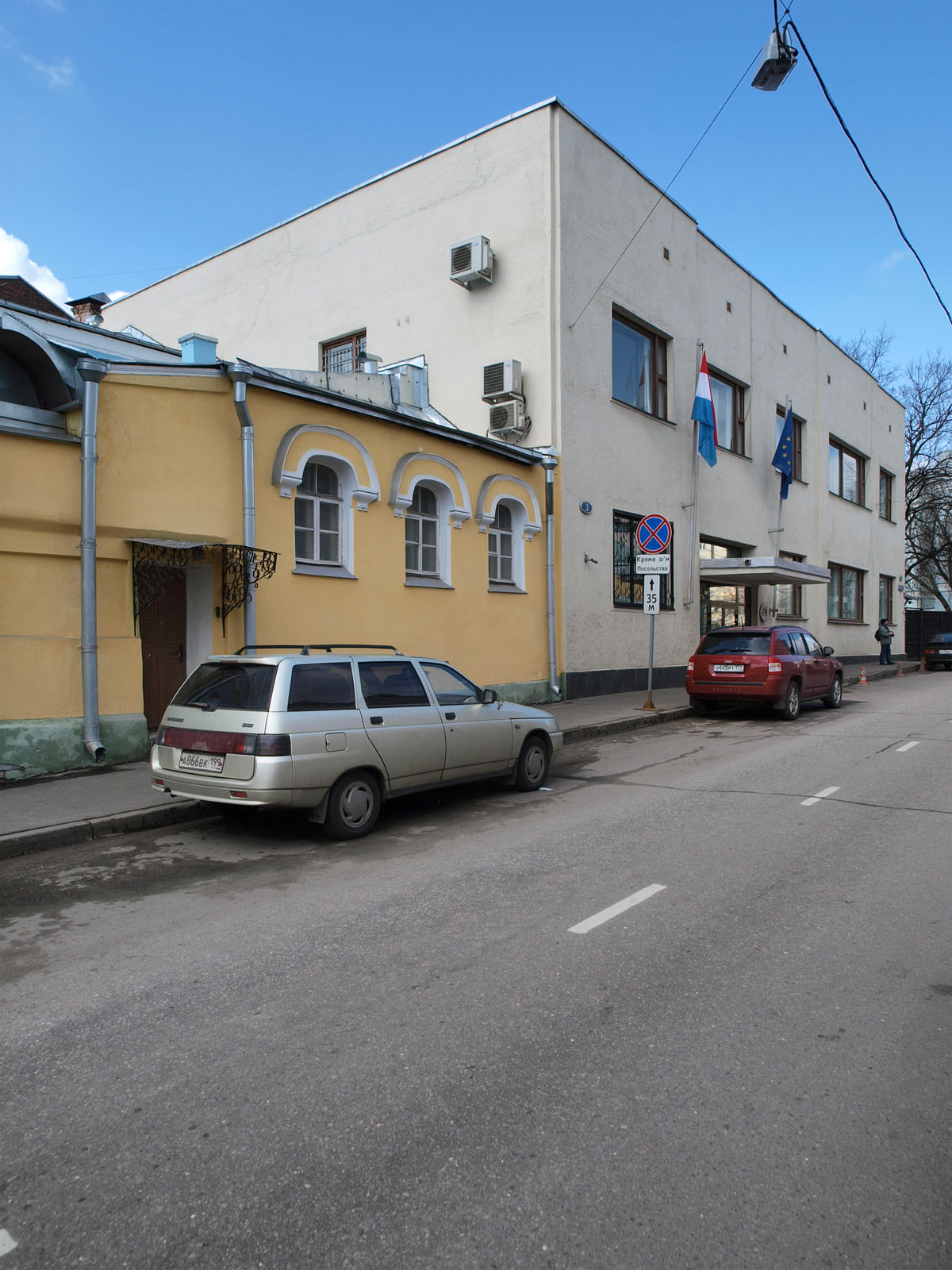
Embassy in Moscow

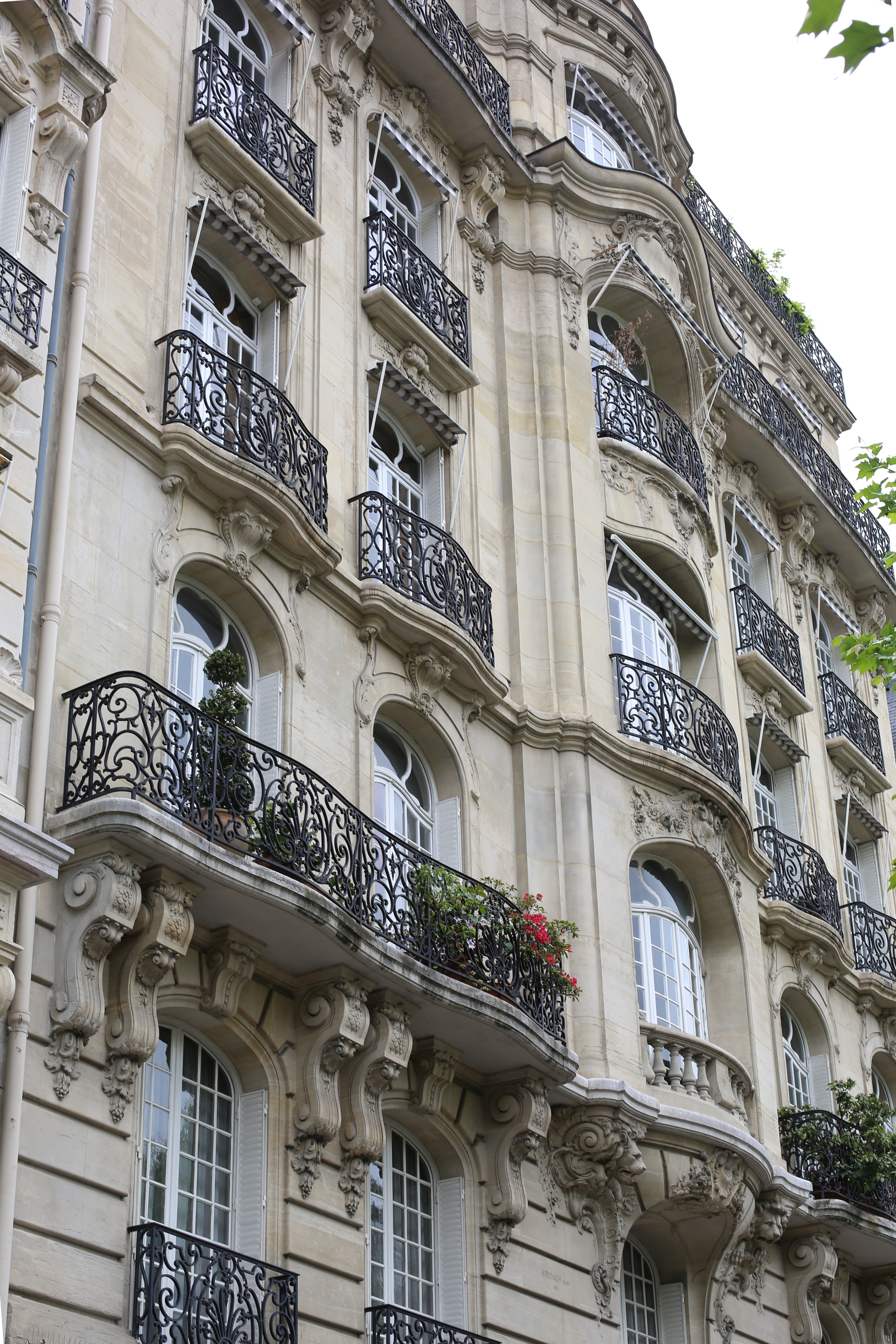
Embassy in Paris

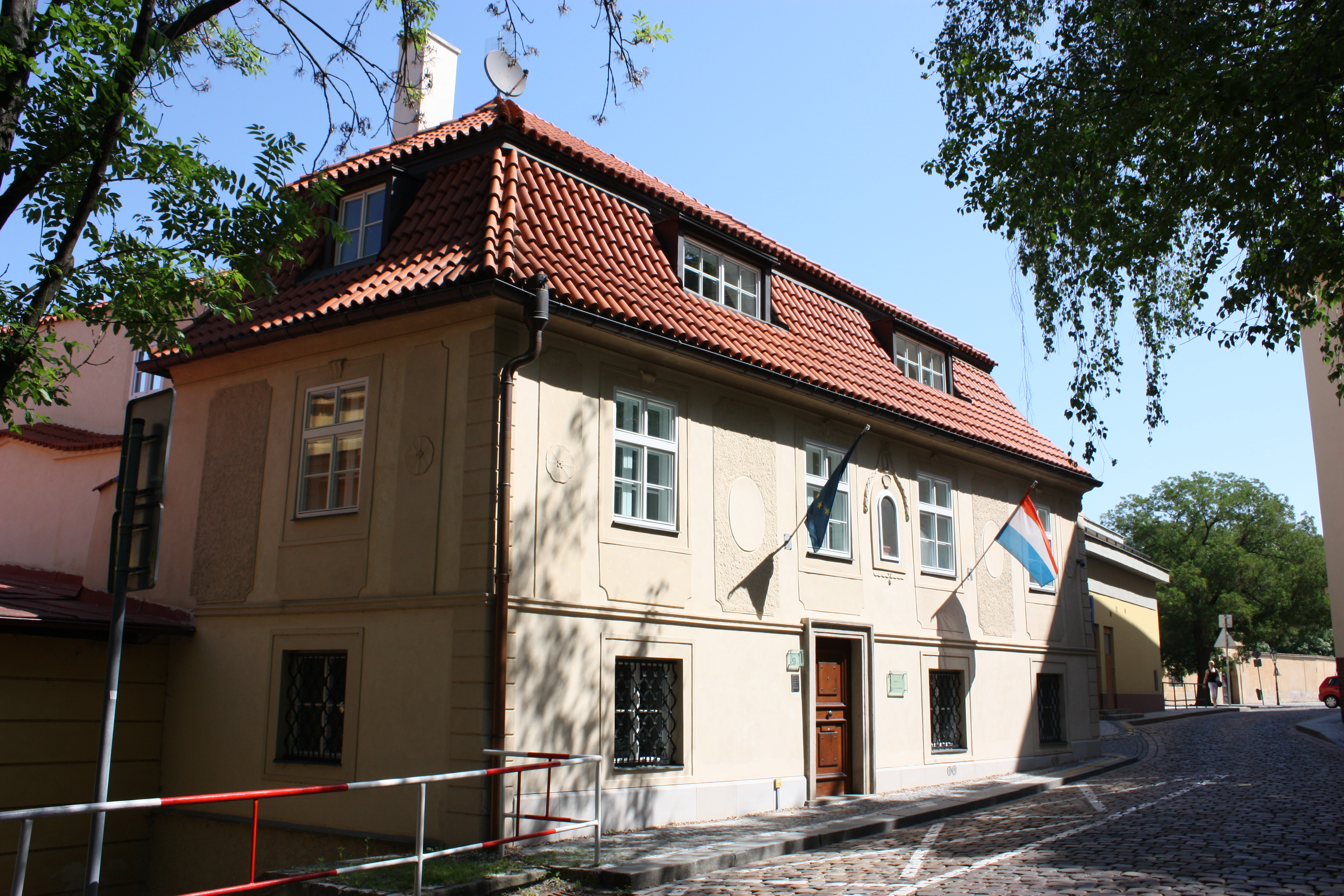
Embassy in Prague

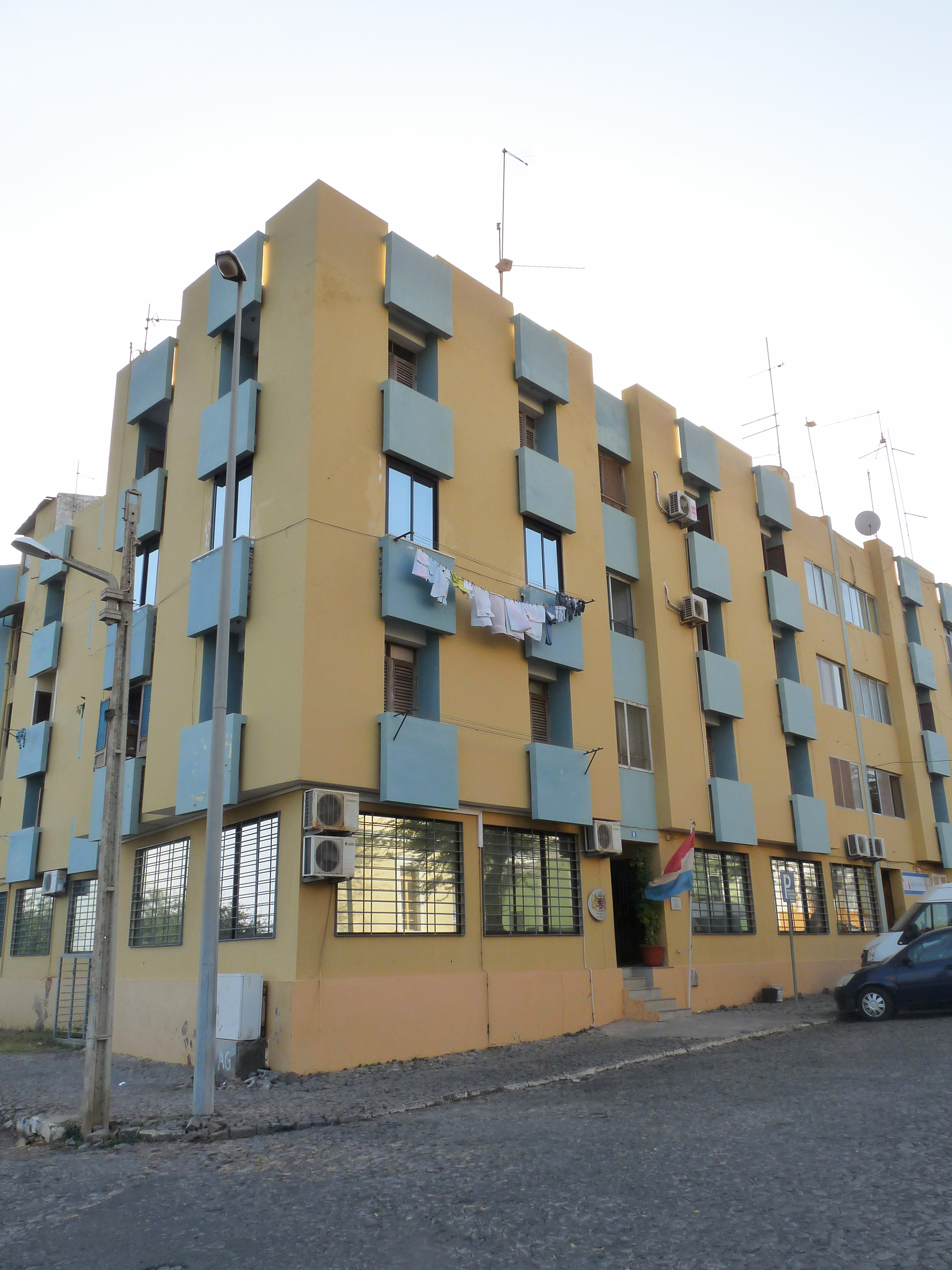
Building hosting the Embassy in Praia

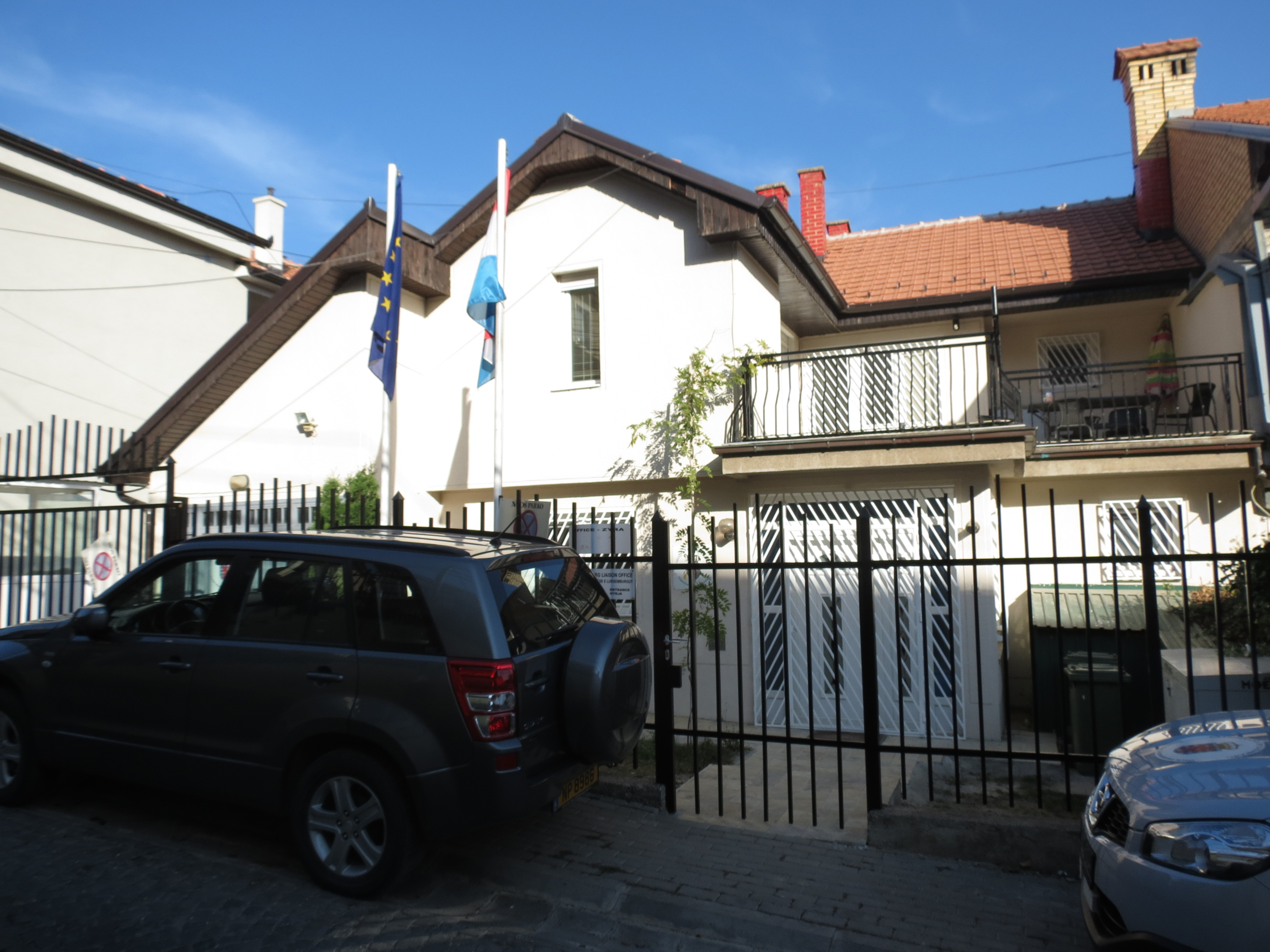
Embassy in Pristina

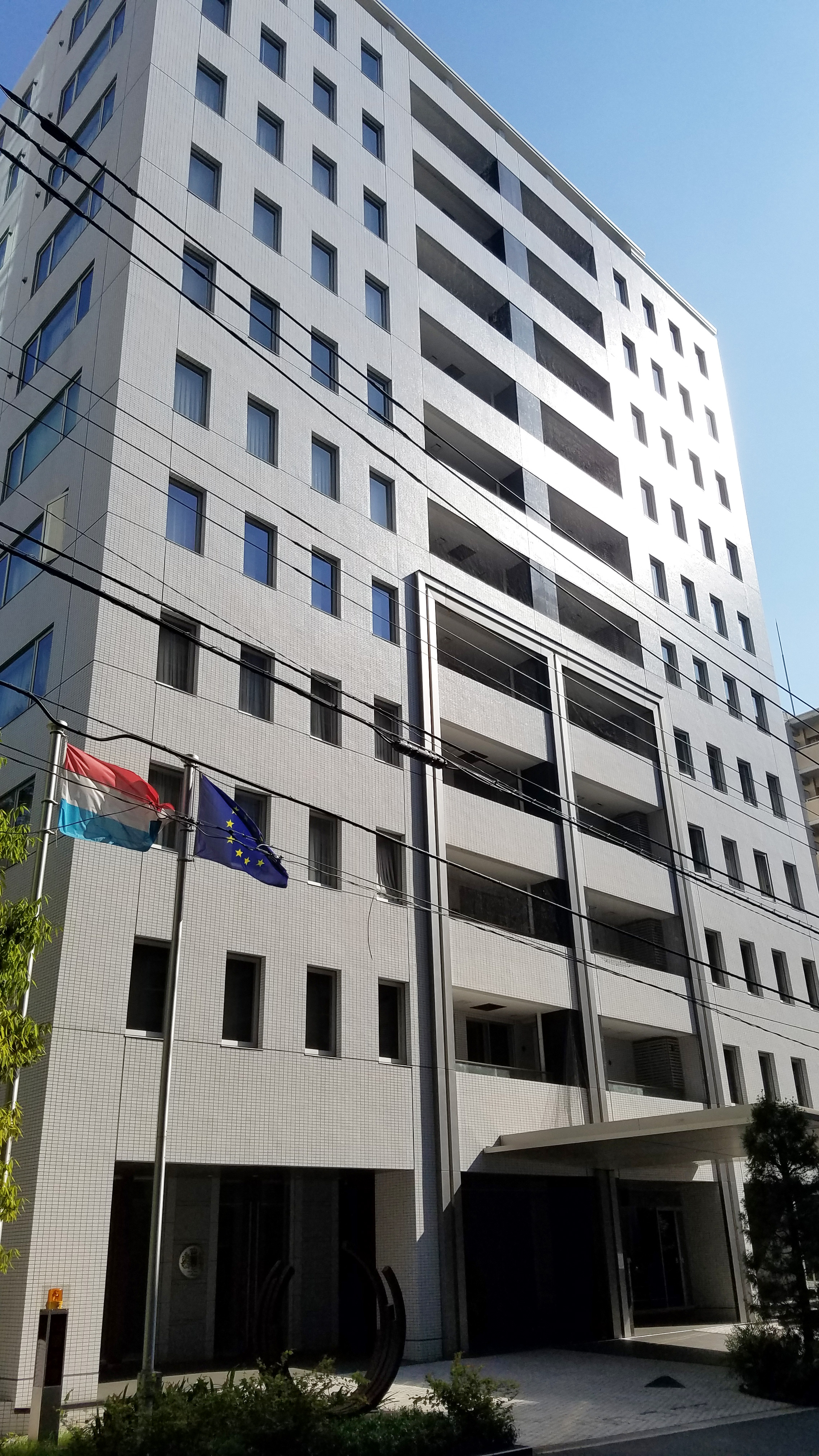
Embassy in Tokyo

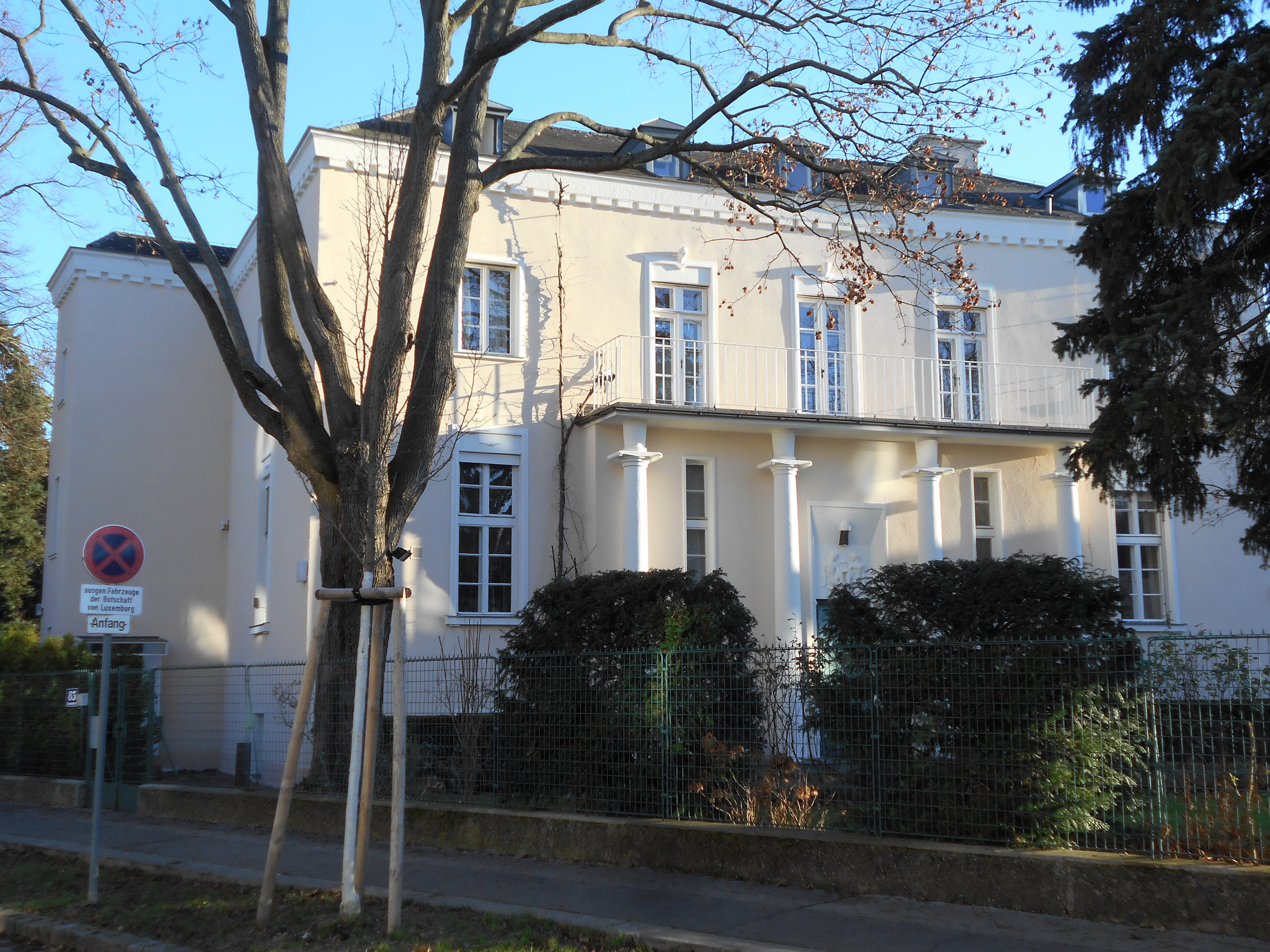
Embassy in Vienna

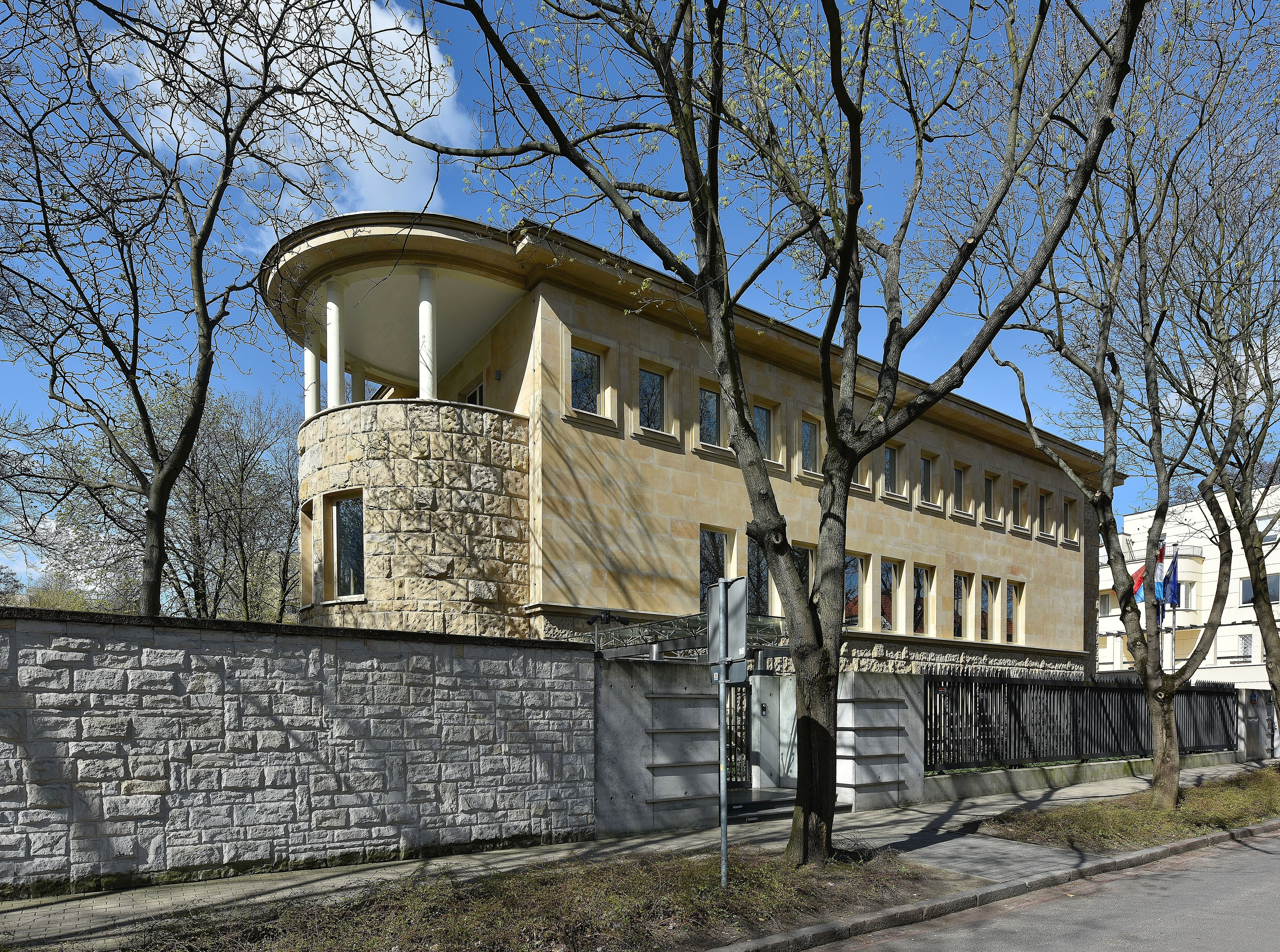
Embassy in Warsaw

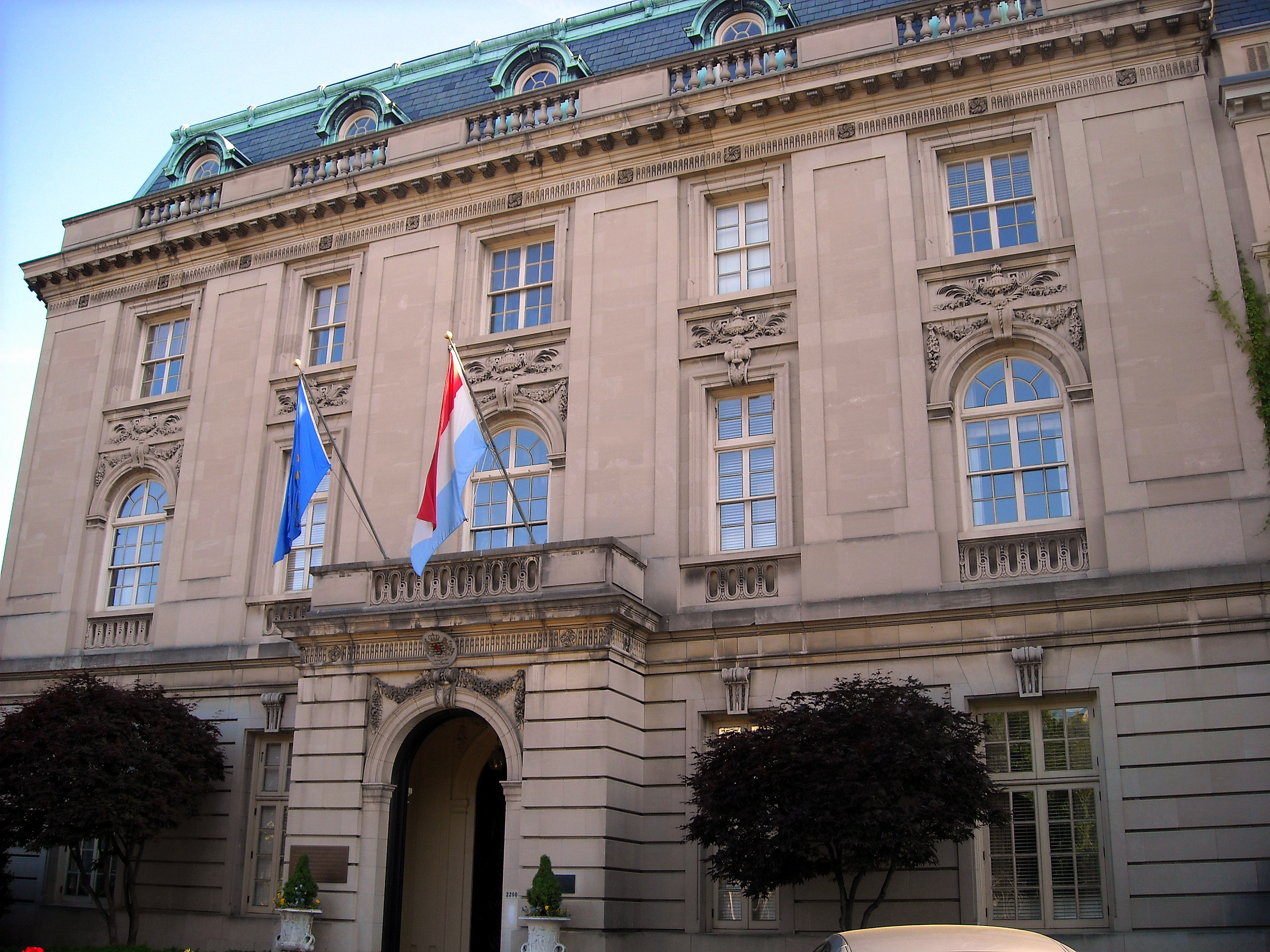
Embassy in Washington, D.C.

== Closed missions ==
=== Africa ===
Host country	Host city	Mission	Year closed	Ref.
Burkina Faso	Ouagadougou	Embassy	2026	
Mali	Bamako	Embassy	2025	
Niger	Niamey	Embassy	2025	

=== Americas ===
Host country	Host city	Mission	Year closed	Ref.
Nicaragua	Managua	Embassy	2022	

== See also ==
- Ministry of Foreign Affairs (Luxembourg)
- Foreign relations of Luxembourg
