= Thomas F. Konop =

American politician (1879–1964)

- Konop, c. 1936

Member of the U.S. House of Representatives from Wisconsin's 9th district
- In office March 4, 1911 – March 3, 1917
- Preceded by: Gustav Küstermann
- Succeeded by: David G. Classon

3rd Dean of the Notre Dame Law School
- In office 1923–1941
- Preceded by: Francis J. Vurpillat
- Succeeded by: Clarence Manion

Personal details
- Born: August 17, 1879 Franklin, Wisconsin, U.S.
- Died: October 17, 1964 (aged 85) San Pierre, Indiana, U.S.
- Party: Democratic

Thomas Frank Konop (August 17, 1879 – October 17, 1964) was a U.S. Representative from Wisconsin.

Konop was born in Franklin, Wisconsin, and was of Czech descent. Konop studied at Two Rivers High School, Oshkosh State Normal School (now the University of Wisconsin–Oshkosh), and Northern Illinois College of Law. He graduated from the University of Nebraska College of Law in 1904. He was admitted to the bar in 1904 and commenced practice in Kewaunee, Wisconsin. He served as district attorney of Kewaunee County, Wisconsin from 1905 to 1911. He moved to Green Bay, Wisconsin, and practiced law from 1915 to 1917.

Konop was elected as a member of the Democratic Party to the Sixty-second, Sixty-third, and Sixty-fourth Congresses (March 4, 1911 – March 3, 1917). He represented Wisconsin's 9th congressional district. He served as chairman of the Committee on Expenditures on Public Buildings (Sixty-third and Sixty-fourth Congresses). He was an unsuccessful candidate for reelection in 1916. He resumed the practice of law in Madison, Wisconsin. He served as a member of the Wisconsin State Industrial Commission from 1917 to 1922. He served as a member of State board of vocational education from 1917 to 1922. He moved to Milwaukee, Wisconsin, and continued the practice of law in 1922 and 1923.

Konop served as dean of the College of Law of the University of Notre Dame from 1923 to 1941, and dean emeritus and professor of law until his retirement in 1950. He continued to live in South Bend, Indiana, until 1962.

Konop died in San Pierre, Indiana, on October 17, 1964. He was interred in Highland Cemetery, South Bend, Indiana.

== Sources ==
- United States Congress. "Thomas F. Konop (id: K000310)". Biographical Directory of the United States Congress.

U.S. House of Representatives
Preceded by Gustav Küstermann	Member of the U.S. House of Representatives from Wisconsin's 9th congressional district March 4, 1911 - March 3, 1917	Succeeded by David G. Classon
