= John Stewart (Illinois politician) =

19th century American businessman and politician

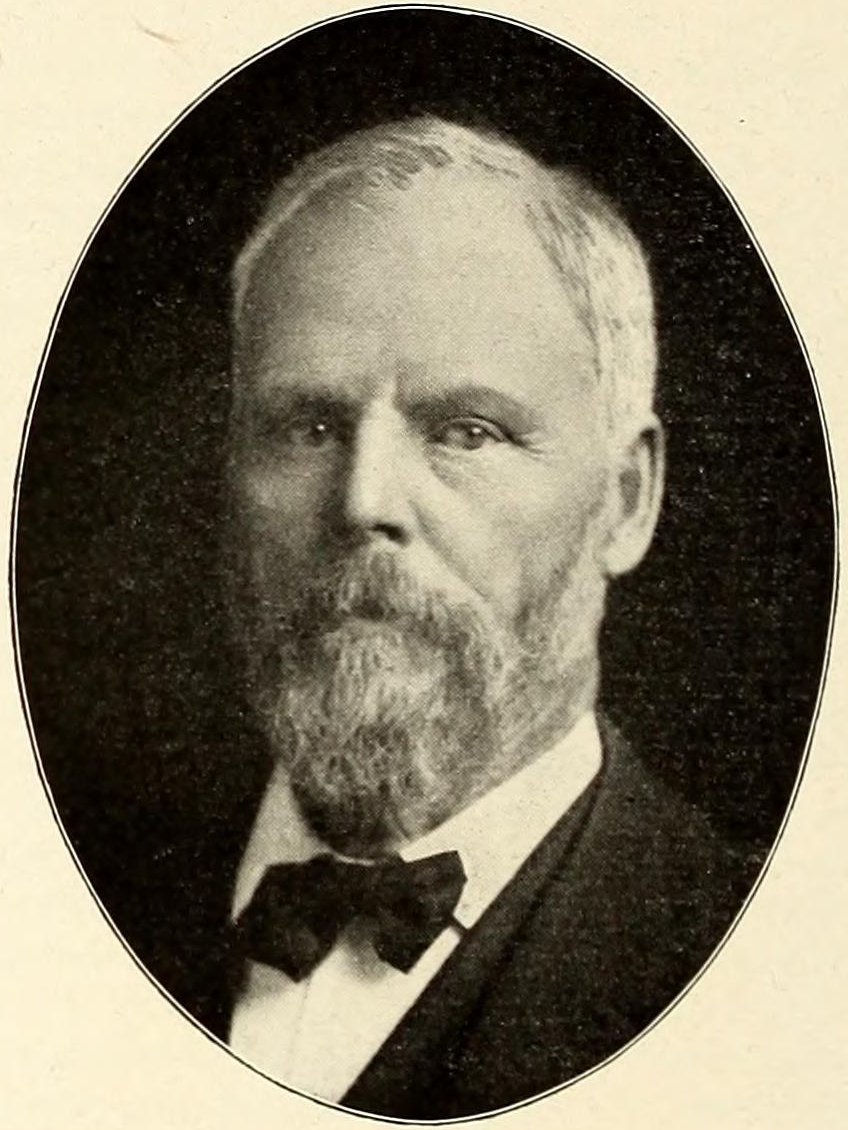
- Portrait from Historical Encyclopedia of Illinois and History of Kane County (1904)

Member of the Illinois House of Representatives from the 14th district
- In office January 1, 1899 – January 1, 1901 Serving with Guy L. Bush & Samuel Alschuler
- Preceded by: Charles P. Bryan, William F. Hunter, & Samuel Alschuler
- Succeeded by: Guy L. Bush, Charles H. Backus, & John A. Logan
- In office January 1, 1885 – January 1, 1889 Serving with L. L. Hiatt (1885), Thomas O'Donnell (1885), Charles Curtiss (1887), & James Herrington (1887)
- Preceded by: H. F. Walker, L. L. Hiatt, & James Herrington
- Succeeded by: Robert M. Ireland, Edgar C. Hawley, & N. R. Graham

Personal details
- Born: August 10, 1825 Fredericton, New Brunswick, British Canada
- Died: March 26, 1915 (aged 89) Aurora, Illinois, U.S.
- Resting place: Blackberry Cemetery, Elburn, Illinois
- Party: Republican
- Spouse: Martha Ann Thomas (m. 1852–1915)
- Children: Thomas B. Stewart^{(b. 1858; died 1921)}; Eliza Jane (Watson)^{(b. 1861; died 1949)}; Nellie Isaline (Alexander)^{(b. 1873; died 1951)}
- Relatives: Alexander Stewart (brother)

John Stewart (August 10, 1825 – March 26, 1915) was a Scottish American immigrant, businessman, Republican politician, and pioneer of Wisconsin and Illinois. From humble beginnings chopping lumber, he founded a lumber business with his brother which made them both millionaires. He also served three terms in the Illinois House of Representatives.

His brother and business partner, Alexander Stewart, served three terms in the U.S. House of Representatives.

== Early life ==
John Stewart was born in Fredericton, New Brunswick, in Canada. At the time of his birth, Canada was still a colony of the United Kingdom. He was raised on his father's farm in York County, New Brunswick, and received a common school education. The area was heavily forested, and Stewart learned about logging and rafting timber in his teenage years.

== Lumber business ==
In 1848, Stewart emigrated to the United States, settling first at St. Charles, Illinois. He worked there for about a year before he was joined by his younger brother, Alexander. Hearing of logging prospects in Wisconsin, the two of them hiked north. They walked from Milwaukee to Stevens Point, then from Stevens Point north to what is now Wausau, Wisconsin, arriving on May 4, 1849.

At the time this was a wild frontier, part of Portage County, Wisconsin, which then comprised a vast swath of northern Wisconsin. Shortly after his arrival, Marathon County was carved out of the area surrounding Wausau.

He and his brother went to work in a saw mill, cutting lumber that had been harvested from the nearby forests. Like many other lumbermen of that era, they took their wages in lumber and ran the slabs down the Wisconsin River to the Mississippi River, and on to St. Louis, to sell it at market. They built up enough savings from these trips that they were able to begin purchasing lumber from other lumberworkers in Wausau, which they would then raft down the river with their own lumber to sell for a profit. Through this process, they accumulated enough money to start their own logging company, known as the A. & J. Stewart Lumber Co. Their company grew and prospered. In their earlier years, they formed a close friendship with Walter D. McIndoe, and frequently cut their lumber at his mill. After his death in 1872, they purchased his mill and incorporated it into their growing enterprise. In that transaction, they also took on a third partner, McIndoe's nephew Walter Alexander.

John Stewart eventually left Wisconsin and settled a farm in Illinois, though he maintained his share of ownership in their business. Alexander remained in Wausau and managed the company for the rest of his life. In 1884, the firm re-incorporated as the Alexander Stewart Lumber Company, with Alexander Stewart as president, John Stewart as vice president, and Walter Alexander as secretary and treasurer.

In Illinois, he became invested in a bank under the firm name Bowman, Warne & Stewart. In 1899 he bought out his partners, in partnership with his son and another partner, E. F. Goodell. The bank was afterwards run as John Stewart & Co.

== Political career ==
John Stewart was elected to the Illinois House of Representatives on the Republican Party ticket in 1884 and was re-elected in 1886. He was subsequently elected to a third term in 1898.

== Personal life and family ==
John Stewart was the eldest of six children born to Thomas and Jane (née Moody) Stewart. Both of Stewart's parents were born in Scotland, they also emigrated from Canada to the United States, settling in Kane County, Illinois. John Stewart's younger brother and business partner, Alexander Stewart, served three terms in the U.S. House of Representatives and also became a millionaire through their business.

On October 20, 1857, John Stewart married Martha A. Thomas. They had five children together, though one died in childhood. Their son, Thomas B. Stewart, managed his father's bank. Their youngest daughter, Nellie, married John's a brother of John's business partner Walter Alexander.

After his brother's death in 1912, John began giving away a large amount of his money. He gave away more than $1,500,000 in charitable donations between 1913 and his death in 1915 (more than $46 million adjusted for inflation to 2024). John Stewart died at his daughter's home in Aurora, Illinois, on March 26, 1915.
