= George H. Hipke =

American politician

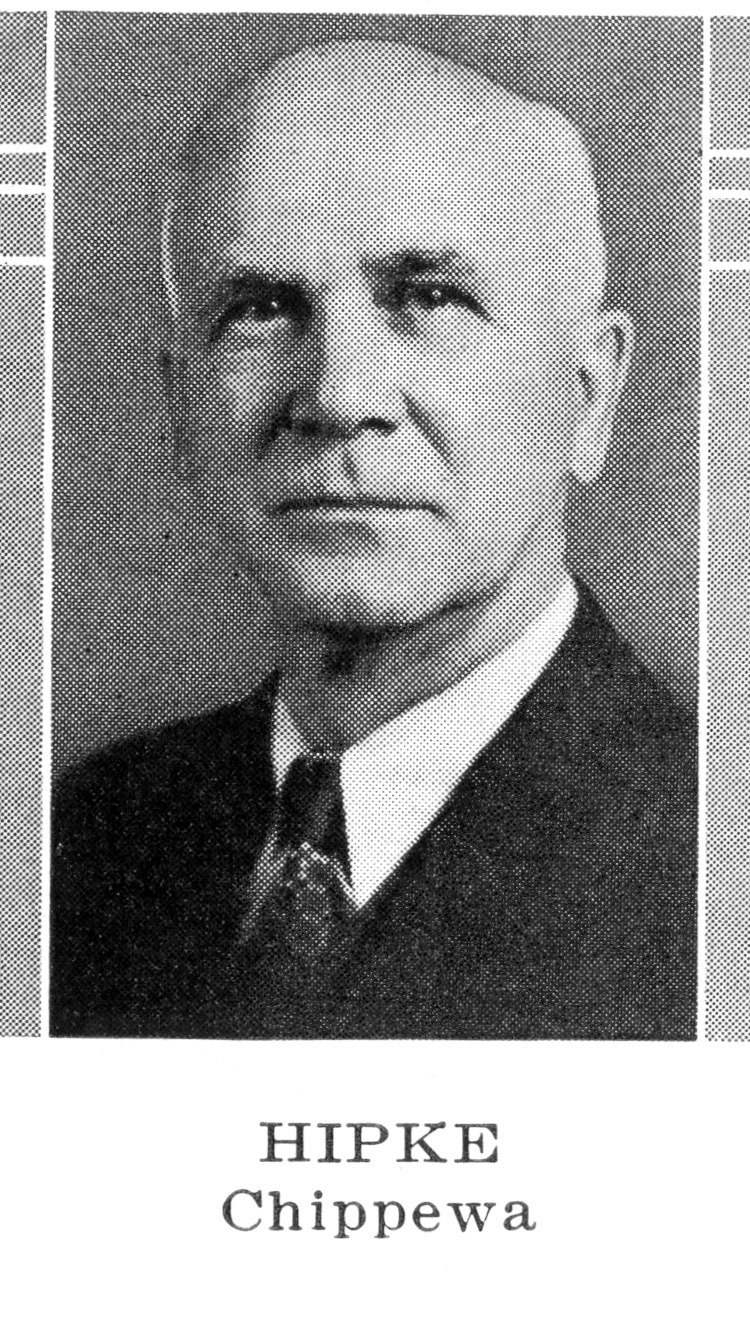
George H. Hipke

George H. Hipke (December 29, 1879 – February 4, 1951), was a member of the Wisconsin State Assembly and the Wisconsin State Senate.

== Career ==
Hipke was a three-term member of the Assembly from 1935 to 1940, and he served two terms in the Senate, from 1941 to 1948, after which he did not seek reelection because of poor health. In addition, he was Mayor of Stanley from 1932 to 1935. In 1942, Hipke was a candidate for the United States House of Representatives from Wisconsin's 9th congressional district, losing to incumbent Merlin Hull. He was a Republican.
