= Alexander Stewart (American politician) =

American politician (1829–1912)

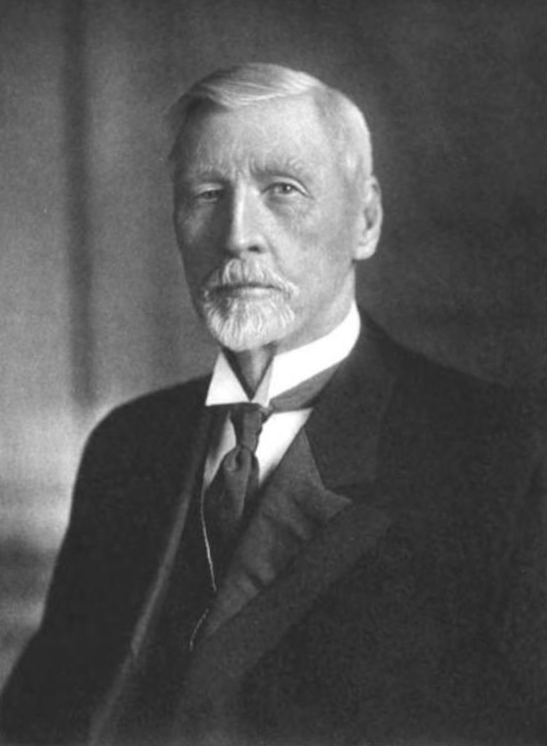
- Portrait from The National Cyclopaedia of American Biography vol. XV (1916)

Member of the U.S. House of Representatives from Wisconsin's 9th district
- In office March 4, 1895 – March 3, 1901
- Preceded by: Thomas Lynch
- Succeeded by: Webster E. Brown

Personal details
- Born: September 12, 1829 Fredericton, New Brunswick, British Canada
- Died: May 24, 1912 (aged 82) Washington, D.C., U.S.
- Resting place: Pine Grove Cemetery, Wausau, Wisconsin (initial); Oak Hill Cemetery Washington, D.C. (re-interred)
- Party: Republican
- Spouse: Margaret Gray (m. 1858–1912)
- Children: Alexander Stewart^{(b. 1862; died 1863)}; Margaret J. (Lindley)^{(b. 1865; died 1926)}; Mary E. Stewart^{(b. 1870; died 1947)}; Helen Gray (Devore)^{(b. 1875; died 1960)}
- Relatives: John Stewart (brother); Daniel Bradford Devore (son-in-law)
- Occupation: Lumberman

Alexander Stewart (September 12, 1829 – May 24, 1912) was a Scottish American immigrant, lumberman, Republican politician, and pioneer settler of Wausau, Wisconsin. He served three terms in the U.S. House of Representatives, representing Wisconsin's 9th congressional district from 1895 to 1901. From humble beginnings chopping lumber, he built a lumber empire with interests in nine states and Canada. Stewart Avenue, one of the main roads in Wausau, is named in his honor. His former home in Washington, D.C., is now the Embassy of Luxembourg. He had no grandchildren, so the bulk of his estate went to the Alexander and Margaret Stewart Trust, which has provided more than $125 million in grants for research on cancer and pediatric diseases.

His elder brother and business partner, John Stewart, also became a millionaire through their work and served in the Illinois House of Representatives.

== Early life ==
Alexander Stewart was born in Fredericton, New Brunswick, in Canada. At the time of his birth, Canada was still a colony of the United Kingdom. He was raised on his father's farm in York County, New Brunswick, and received a common school education. The area was heavily forested, and Stewart learned about logging and rafting timber in his teenage years.

== Lumber business ==
He came to the United States in 1849 and joined his elder brother, John, in St. Charles, Illinois. Hearing of logging prospects in Wisconsin, the two of them hiked north. They walked from Milwaukee to Stevens Point, then from Stevens Point north to what is now Wausau, Wisconsin, arriving on May 4, 1849.

At the time this was a wild frontier, part of Portage County, Wisconsin, which then comprised a vast swath of northern Wisconsin. Shortly after his arrival, Marathon County was carved out of the area surrounding Wausau. According to his obituary, Stewart personally cut down the pine trees in the area that is now the Wausau downtown square.

He and his brother went to work in a saw mill, cutting lumber that had been harvested from the nearby forests. Like many other lumbermen of that era, they took their wages in lumber and ran the slabs down the Wisconsin River to the Mississippi River, and on to St. Louis, to sell it at market. They built up enough savings from these trips that they were able to begin purchasing lumber from other lumberworkers in Wausau, which they would then raft down the river with their own lumber to sell for a profit. Through this process, they accumulated enough money to start their own logging company, known as the A. & J. Stewart Lumber Co. Their company grew and prospered. In their earlier years, they formed a close friendship with Walter D. McIndoe, and frequently cut their lumber at his mill. After his death in 1872, they purchased his mill and incorporated it into their growing enterprise. In that transaction, they also took on a third partner, McIndoe's nephew Walter Alexander.

John Stewart eventually left Wisconsin and settled a farm in Illinois, though he maintained his share of ownership in their business. Alexander remained in Wausau and managed the company for the rest of his life. In 1884, the firm re-incorporated as the Alexander Stewart Lumber Company, with Stewart as president, his brother John as vice president, and Walter Alexander as secretary and treasurer. For roughly 30 years, from the 1880s to 1910s, the Stewart Lumber Company was the largest industry in the Wisconsin River valley, spreading to several other counties in Wisconsin. By the time of his death, they owned or had significant interests in lumber-related companies in Michigan, Arkansas, California, Minnesota, Indiana, Nebraska, Colorado, Iowa, and Ontario.

== Political career ==
Wisconsin's 9th congressional district 1892–1901

As his business empire grew, Stewart became active in politics with the Republican Party of Wisconsin. He was a delegate to the 1884 Republican National Convention, but never attempted to run for office until 1894. His biography suggests that he was finally comfortable running for office after the appointment of Walter Alexander as secretary and treasurer of his company.

Early in 1894, Stewart was being discussed as a potential candidate for governor of Wisconsin, but by May he let it become known that he would seek to challenge incumbent Democratic U.S. representative Thomas Lynch in Wisconsin's 9th congressional district. In those days, the 9th congressional district comprised about half of northern Wisconsin. Stewart faced a difficult challenge for the nomination, opposed by former lieutenant governor Sam Fifield and former state senator Merritt C. Ring. Stewart was active in stumping for delegates at the various county-level conventions and he was nominated by the district convention on the first ballot.

Stewart was a staunch supporter of tariffs, which had been lowered under the previous Congress. In the general election, he easily defeated the Democratic incumbent, winning 56% of the vote. He won re-election with large majorities in 1896 and 1898. In the Spring of 1900, Stewart announced that he would not run for a fourth term, saying that he wanted to return his attention to his business interests. He generally voted with his party in Congress, supporting the declaration of war against Spain, the Dingley tariffs, the Bankruptcy Act of 1898, and the Gold Standard Act. His chief legislative accomplishment for his district was a new federal building in Wausau.

== Personal life and family ==
Alexander Stewart was the second son and third of six children born to Thomas and Jane (née Moody) Stewart. Both of Stewart's parents were born in Scotland, they also emigrated from Canada to the United States, settling in Kane County, Illinois. Alexander Stewart's brother and business partner, John Stewart, also became fabulously wealthy from their partnership and gave away more than $1,500,000 in charitable donations between 1913 and his death in 1915 (more than $46 million adjusted for inflation to 2024).

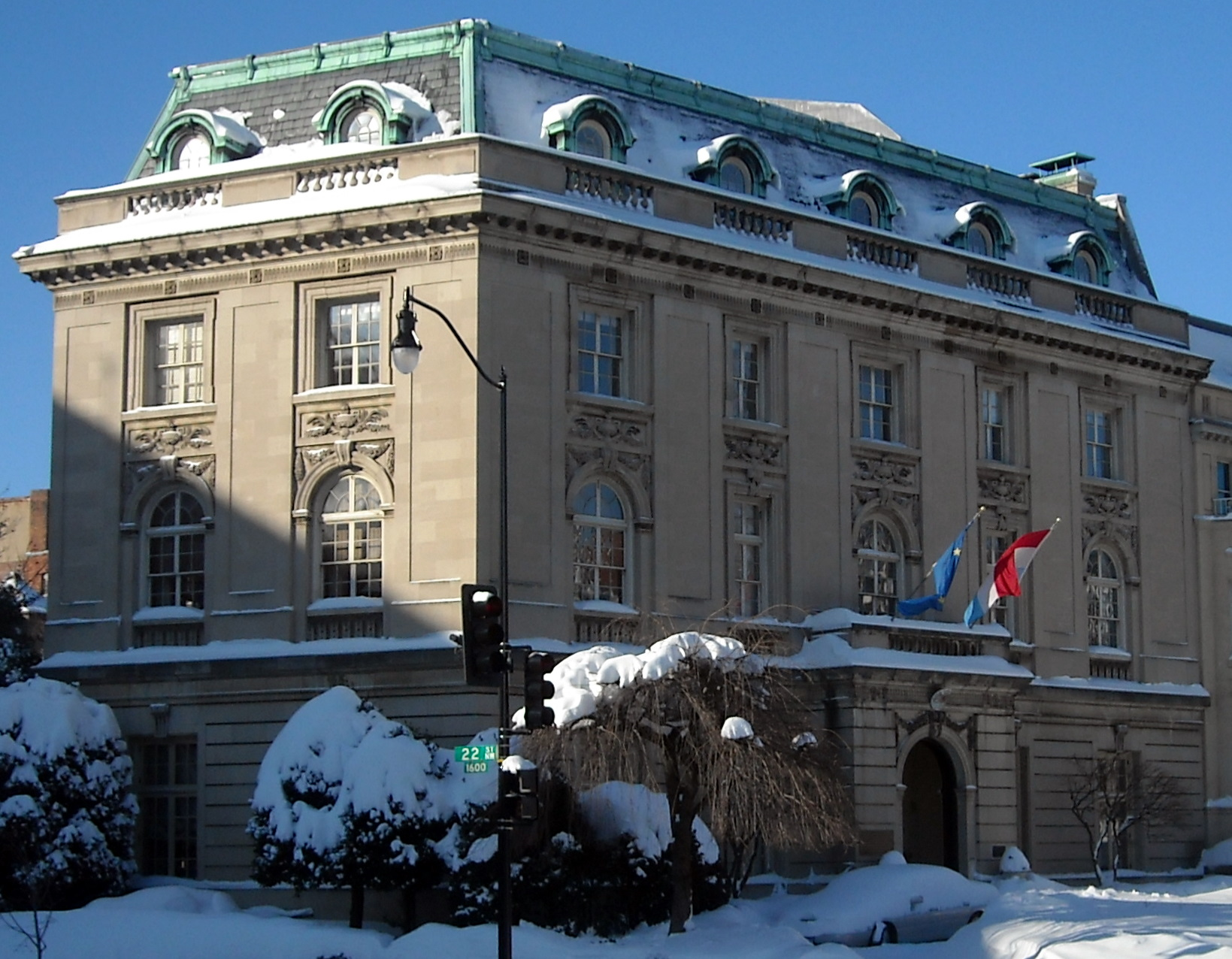
The Alexander Stewart House in Washington, D.C., now serves as the Embassy of Luxembourg.

On May 23, 1858, Alexander Stewart married Margaret Gray in Chicago. Margaret was also a Scottish Canadian immigrant from New Brunswick. They had four children together, though one died in infancy. Their youngest daughter, Helen, married United States Army general Daniel Bradford Devore.

During his second term in Congress, Stewart moved his family to Washington, D.C. After leaving office, he continued to reside in Washington during the winter months, returning to Wausau during the summer. In 1909 he finished construction of a new mansion in Washington, located at 2200 Massachusetts Avenue, N.W.

That year, he fell during a visit to the Rothschild Paper Mill, which he had invested in. He broke his arm and took time to recuperate, after which it was said he never fully regained his vitality. He spent the next two winters in California, hoping to regain his strength, but returned in worse health. After Christmans 1911, he felt somewhat improved and returned to Washington with his family. But his health declined again he died at his home in Washington on May 24, 1912.

He was initially buried at Pine Grove Cemetery in Wausau. After his death, however, his wife paid for the construction of a massive mausoleum in Washington, D.C.'s Oak Hill Cemetery, and his body was re-interred there after his wife's death in 1931. At the time of his death, his estate was estimated to be worth about $3,000,000 (nearly $100,000,000 adjusted for inflation to 2024).

After the death of his wife and his eldest daughter, his remaining daughters agreed to form the Alexander and Margaret Stewart Trust. Stewart had no grandchildren, so the bulk of his fortune went to the Trust, which focuses on cancer research and pediatric diseases, with a geographic focus on Washington, D.C. The Trust has given out more than $125 million in grants.

In 1941, Stewart's former mansion at 2200 Massachusetts Avenue, N.W., Washington, D.C., was sold by his daughter to Charlotte, Grand Duchess of Luxembourg, who was then in exile due to the Nazi occupation of Luxembourg. The government of Luxembourg bought the home in 1962, and has since operated it as their Embassy in Washington.

== Electoral history ==
=== U.S. House (1894, 1896, 1898) ===
Year	Election	Date	Elected				Defeated				Total	Plurality
1894	General	Nov. 6	Alexander Stewart	Republican	22,741	55.98%	Thomas Lynch (inc)	Dem.	14,910	36.70%	40,623	7,831
1894	General	Nov. 6	Alexander Stewart	Republican	22,741	55.98%	John F. Miles	Peo.	2,187	5.38%	40,623	7,831
1894	General	Nov. 6	Alexander Stewart	Republican	22,741	55.98%	John J. Sherman	Proh.	785	1.93%	40,623	7,831
1896	General	Nov. 3	Alexander Stewart (inc)	Republican	30,438	63.22%	William W. O'Keefe	Dem.	17,705	36.78%	48,143	12,733
1898	General	Nov. 8	Alexander Stewart (inc)	Republican	20,825	58.07%	Wells M. Ruggles	Dem.	14,373	40.08%	35,861	6,452
1898	General	Nov. 8	Alexander Stewart (inc)	Republican	20,825	58.07%	Edwin Kerswill	Proh.	663	1.85%	35,861	6,452

U.S. House of Representatives
Preceded by Thomas Lynch	Member of the U.S. House of Representatives from Wisconsin's 9th congressional district March 4, 1895 - March 3, 1901	Succeeded by Webster E. Brown
