= Wisconsin's 9th congressional district =

Former U.S. House district from 1873 to 2003

- Obsolete district
- Created: 1880
- Eliminated: 2000
- Years active: 1883-2003

Wisconsin's 9th congressional district was a congressional district of the United States House of Representatives in Wisconsin. It was created following the 1870 census along with the 8th district, and was disbanded after the 2000 census.

From 1965 to 2003, the district included most of the western and north-western suburbs of Milwaukee. In its final configuration, it contained all of Washington and Ozaukee Counties, most of Dodge and Jefferson Counties, the northern and western halves of Waukesha County, and the eastern parts of Sheboygan County, including the town of Sheboygan itself. It was usually the most Republican district in the state, voting 63% to 34% for George Bush over Al Gore at the 2000 election. The district was also the longest in the state (as well as the last) to be represented by a member of the Wisconsin Progressive Party however, when the party briefly surged to dominate Wisconsin’s politics during the 1930s, being represented by Merlin Hull for twelve years until 1947, when he switched to the Republican Party. At the time, the district covered much of the far western part of the state.

== List of members representing the district ==
Member	Party	Dates	Cong ress	Electoral history	District
District established March 4, 1883
Isaac Stephenson (Marinette)	Republican	March 4, 1883 – March 3, 1889	48th 49th 50th	Elected in 1882. Re-elected in 1884. Re-elected in 1886. Retired.	Ashland, Chippewa, Door, Florence, Langlade, Lincoln, Marathon, Marinette, Oconto, Price, Portage, Shawano, Taylor, Waupaca, & Wood counties (& Forest, Oneida, & Sawyer counties created from this territory during the 1880s)
Myron H. McCord (Merrill)	Republican	March 4, 1889 – March 3, 1891	51st	Elected in 1888. Lost re-election.	Ashland, Chippewa, Door, Florence, Langlade, Lincoln, Marathon, Marinette, Oconto, Price, Portage, Shawano, Taylor, Waupaca, & Wood counties (& Forest, Oneida, & Sawyer counties created from this territory during the 1880s)
Thomas Lynch (Antigo)	Democratic	March 4, 1891 – March 3, 1895	52nd	Elected in 1890.	Ashland, Chippewa, Door, Florence, Langlade, Lincoln, Marathon, Marinette, Oconto, Price, Portage, Shawano, Taylor, Waupaca, & Wood counties (& Forest, Oneida, & Sawyer counties created from this territory during the 1880s)
Thomas Lynch (Antigo)	Democratic	March 4, 1891 – March 3, 1895	53rd	Re-elected in 1892. Lost re-election.	Ashland, Clark, Florence, Forest, Langlade, Lincoln, Marathon, Marinette, Oconto, Oneida, Price, Shawano, & Taylor counties
Alexander Stewart (Wausau)	Republican	March 4, 1895 – March 3, 1901	54th 55th 56th	Elected in 1894. Re-elected in 1896. Re-elected in 1898. Retired.	Ashland, Clark, Florence, Forest, Langlade, Lincoln, Marathon, Marinette, Oconto, Oneida, Price, Shawano, & Taylor counties
Webster E. Brown (Rhinelander)	Republican	March 4, 1901 – March 3, 1903	57th	Elected in 1900. Redistricted to the 10th district.	Ashland, Clark, Florence, Forest, Langlade, Lincoln, Marathon, Marinette, Oconto, Oneida, Price, Shawano, & Taylor counties
Edward S. Minor (Sturgeon Bay)	Republican	March 4, 1903 – March 3, 1907	58th 59th	Redistricted from the 8th district and re-elected in 1902. Re-elected in 1904. Lost renomination.	Brown, Door, Kewaunee, Marinette, Oconto, & Outagamie counties
Gustav Küstermann (Green Bay)	Republican	March 4, 1907 – March 3, 1911	60th 61st	Elected in 1906. Re-elected in 1908. Lost re-election.	Brown, Door, Kewaunee, Marinette, Oconto, & Outagamie counties
Thomas F. Konop (Green Bay)	Democratic	March 4, 1911 – March 3, 1917	62nd	Elected in 1910.	Brown, Door, Kewaunee, Marinette, Oconto, & Outagamie counties
Thomas F. Konop (Green Bay)	Democratic	March 4, 1911 – March 3, 1917	63rd 64th	Re-elected in 1912. Re-elected in 1914. Lost re-election.	Brown, Door, Florence, Forest, Kewaunee, Langlade, Marinette, Oconto, & Outagamie counties
David G. Classon (Oconto)	Republican	March 4, 1917 – March 3, 1923	65th 66th 67th	Elected in 1916. Re-elected in 1918. Re-elected in 1920. Retired.	Brown, Door, Florence, Forest, Kewaunee, Langlade, Marinette, Oconto, & Outagamie counties
George J. Schneider (Appleton)	Republican	March 4, 1923 – March 3, 1933	68th 69th 70th 71st 72nd	Elected in 1922. Re-elected in 1924. Re-elected in 1926. Re-elected in 1928. Re-elected in 1930. Redistricted to the 8th district and lost re-election.	Brown, Door, Florence, Forest, Kewaunee, Langlade, Marinette, Oconto, & Outagamie counties
James A. Frear (Hudson)	Republican	March 4, 1933 – January 3, 1935	73rd	Redistricted from the 10th district and re-elected in 1932. Retired.	Barron, Buffalo, Chippewa, Clark, Dunn, Eau Claire, Jackson, Pepin, Pierce, St. Croix, & Trempealeau counties
Merlin Hull (Black River Falls)	Progressive	January 3, 1935 – January 3, 1947	74th 75th 76th 77th 78th 79th 80th 81st 82nd 83rd	Elected in 1934. Re-elected in 1936. Re-elected in 1938. Re-elected in 1940. Re-elected in 1942. Re-elected in 1944. Re-elected in 1946. Re-elected in 1948. Re-elected in 1950. Re-elected in 1952. Died.	Barron, Buffalo, Chippewa, Clark, Dunn, Eau Claire, Jackson, Pepin, Pierce, St. Croix, & Trempealeau counties
Merlin Hull (Black River Falls)	Republican	January 3, 1947 – May 17, 1953	74th 75th 76th 77th 78th 79th 80th 81st 82nd 83rd	Elected in 1934. Re-elected in 1936. Re-elected in 1938. Re-elected in 1940. Re-elected in 1942. Re-elected in 1944. Re-elected in 1946. Re-elected in 1948. Re-elected in 1950. Re-elected in 1952. Died.	Barron, Buffalo, Chippewa, Clark, Dunn, Eau Claire, Jackson, Pepin, Pierce, St. Croix, & Trempealeau counties
Vacant		May 17, 1953 – October 13, 1953	83rd		Barron, Buffalo, Chippewa, Clark, Dunn, Eau Claire, Jackson, Pepin, Pierce, St. Croix, & Trempealeau counties
Lester Johnson (Black River Falls)	Democratic	October 13, 1953 – January 3, 1965	83rd 84th 85th 86th 87th 88th	Elected to finish Hull's term. Re-elected in 1954. Re-elected in 1956. Re-elected in 1958. Re-elected in 1960. Re-elected in 1962. Retired.	Barron, Buffalo, Chippewa, Clark, Dunn, Eau Claire, Jackson, Pepin, Pierce, St. Croix, & Trempealeau counties
Glenn R. Davis (Waukesha)	Republican	January 3, 1965 – December 31, 1974	89th 90th 91st 92nd	Elected in 1964. Re-elected in 1966. Re-elected in 1968. Re-elected in 1970.	Waukesha County & northern Milwaukee County: Village of Bayside; Village of Brown Deer; Village of Fox Point; Village of River Hills; Village of Shorewood; Village of Whitefish Bay; City of Glendale; City of Wauwatosa; The part of the city of Milwaukee north of a line extending from the point where N. 60th St. intersects with W. Wright St. at the city limits, following N. 60th St. north to Burleigh St., west to Lisbon Ave., northwest to Wauwatosa Ave., north to Hampton Ave., then east to the city limits
Glenn R. Davis (Waukesha)	Republican	January 3, 1965 – December 31, 1974	93rd	Re-elected in 1972. Lost renomination and resigned early.	Ozaukee, Washington, & Waukesha counties & southeast Dodge County, most of Jefferson County, & northeast Milwaukee County: Dodge County; Town of Ashippun; Town of Emmet; Town of Lebanon; Town of Rubicon; Village of Neosho; the part of the city of Watertown in the county; Jefferson County; all of Jefferson County except the city of Whitewater; Milwaukee County; Village of Bayside; Village of Brown Deer; Village of Fox Point; Village of River Hills; Village of Shorewood; Village of Whitefish Bay; City of Glendale
Vacant		December 31, 1974 – January 3, 1975	93rd		
Bob Kasten (Brookfield)	Republican	January 3, 1975 – January 3, 1979	94th 95th	Elected in 1974. Re-elected in 1976. Retired to run for Governor of Wisconsin.	
Jim Sensenbrenner (Menomonee Falls)	Republican	January 3, 1979 – January 3, 2003	96th 97th	Elected in 1978. Re-elected in 1980.	
Jim Sensenbrenner (Menomonee Falls)	Republican	January 3, 1979 – January 3, 2003	98th 99th 100th 101st 102nd	Re-elected in 1982. Re-elected in 1984. Re-elected in 1986. Re-elected in 1988. Re-elected in 1990.	Ozaukee & Washington counties & eastern Dodge County, parts of Fond du Lac County, most of Jefferson County, & northeast Milwaukee County, southern Sheboygan County & most of Waukesha County: Dodge County; Town of Ashippun; Town of Burnett; Town of Chester; Town of Herman; Town of Hubbard; Town of Lebanon; Town of LeRoy; Town of Lomira; Town of Rubicon; Town of Theresa; Town of Williamstown; Village of Brownsville; Village of Iron Ridge; Village of Kekoskee; Village of Lomira; Village of Neosho; Village of Theresa; City of Mayville; the part of the city of Watertown in the county; the part of the city of Waupun in the county; Fond du Lac County; Town of Auburn; Town of Waupun; Village of Campbellsport; the part of the city of Waupun in the county; Jefferson County; all of Jefferson County except the city of Whitewater; Milwaukee County; Village of Fox Point; Village of River Hills; Village of Whitefish Bay; the part of the village of Bayside in the county.; Sheboygan County; Town of Holland; Town of Scott; Town of Sheboygan; Town of Sherman; Town of Wilson; Village of Adell; Village of Cedar Grove; Village of Oostburg; Village of Random Lake; City of Sheboygan; Waukesha County; Town of Brookfield; Town of Delafield; Town of Eagle; Town of Genesee; Town of Lisbon; Town of Merton; Town of Mukwonago; Town of Oconomowoc; Town of Ottawa; Town of Pewaukee; Town of Summit; Village of Butler; Village of Chenequa; Village of Dousman; Village of Eagle; Village of Elm Grove; Village of Hartland; Village of Lac La Belle; Village of Lannon; Village of Menomonee Falls; Village of Merton; Village of Mukwonago; Village of Nashotah; Village of North Prairie; Village of Oconomowoc Lake; Village of Pewaukee; Village of Sussex; Village of Wales; City of Brookfield; City of Delafield; City of Oconomowoc; the part of the city of Waukesha north of a line extending from the point where the right-of-way of the M.St.P. & S.S.M. railroad intersects the northern city limits, south along the right-of-way of the M.St.P. & S.S.M. railroad to Moreland Blvd., then east to Murray Ave., north to Catherine St., east to Highland Ave., north to Josephine St., east to Cardinal Dr., north to Atlantic Dr., east to Empire Dr., northeasterly on Empire Dr. and Wolf Rd. to the city limits
Jim Sensenbrenner (Menomonee Falls)	Republican	January 3, 1979 – January 3, 2003	103rd 104th 105th 106th 107th	Re-elected in 1992. Re-elected in 1994. Re-elected in 1996. Re-elected in 1998. Re-elected in 2000. Redistricted to the 5th district.	Ozaukee & Washington counties & most of Dodge County, part of Fond du Lac County, most of Jefferson County, & northeast Milwaukee County, eastern Sheboygan County & northern Waukesha County: Dodge County; Town of Ashippun; Town of Beaver Dam; Town of Burnett; Town of Chester; Town of Clyman; Town of Emmet; Town of Herman; Town of Hubbard; Town of Hustisford; Town of Lebanon; Town of Leroy; Town of Lomira; Town of Lowell; Town of Oak Grove; Town of Rubicon; Town of Theresa; Town of Williamstown; Ward 2, town of Calamus; Village of Brownsville; Village of Clyman; Village of Hustisford; Village of Iron Ridge; Village of Kekoskee; Village of Lomira; Village of Lowell; Village of Neosho; Village of Reeseville; Village of Theresa; City of Beaver Dam; City of Horicon; City of Juneau; City of Mayville; the part of the city of Hartford in the county; the part of the city of Watertown in the county; the part of the city of Waupun in the county; Fond du Lac County; Ward 2, town of Ashland; Jefferson County; Town of Aztalan; Town of Cold Spring; Town of Concord; Town of Farmington; Town of Hebron; Town of Ixonia; Town of Jefferson; Town of Lake Mills; Town of Milford; Town of Oakland; Town of Sullivan; Town of Sumner; Town of Waterloo; Town of Watertown; wards 2-5, town of Koshkonong; ward 1, town of Palmyra; Village of Johnson Creek; Village of Palmyra; Village of Sullivan; the part of the village of Cambridge in the county; City of Fort Atkinson; City of Jefferson; City of Lake Mills; the part of the city of Watertown in the county; wards 4, 5, city of Waterloo; Sheboygan County; Town of Herman; Town of Holland; Town of Mosel; Town of Sheboygan; Town of Sherman; Town of Wilson; ward 1, town of Scott; Village of Adell; Village of Cedar Grove; Village of Howards Grove; Village of Kohler; Village of Oostburg; Village of Random Lake; City of Sheboygan; City of Sheboygan Falls; Waukesha County; Town of Brookfield; Town of Delafield; Town of Eagle; Town of Genesee; Town of Lisbon; Town of Merton; Town of Oconomowoc; Town of Ottawa; Town of Summit; wards 1-3, 9-12, town of Pewaukee; Village of Butler; Village of Chenequa; Village of Dousman; Village of Eagle; Village of Elm Grove; Village of Hartland; Village of Lac La Belle; Village of Lannon; Village of Menomonee Falls; Village of Merton; Village of Nashotah; Village of North Prairie; Village of Oconomowoc Lake; Village of Pewaukee; Village of Sussex; Village of Wales; City of Brookfield; City of Delafield; City of Oconomowoc; the part of the city of Milwaukee in the county
District dissolved January 3, 2003

== Electoral history ==
Wisconsin's 9th congressional district: Results 1882–2000
Year	Democrat	Votes	Pct	Republican	Votes	Pct		3rd Partyprogr	Party	Votes	Pct		3rd Party	Party	Votes	Pct	
1884	James Meehan	19,885	45%	Isaac Stephenson	23,414	54%		A. J. Smith	Prohibition	457	1%						
1886	John Ringle	17,763	44%	Isaac Stephenson	22,518	56%	*										
1888	H. W. Early	24,775	45%	Myron H. McCord	27,538	51%		A. C. Merryman	Prohibition	1,467	3%		John F. Moore	Union Labor	579	1%	*
1890	Thomas Lynch	24,491	54%	Myron H. McCord	19,151	43%		J. H. Vrooman	Prohibition	1,290	3%	*					
1892	Thomas Lynch	19,608	52%	Myron H. McCord	16,519	44%		Adolph D. Pergoli	People's	1,423	4%		William D. Badger	Prohibition	26	0%	
1894	Thomas Lynch	14,910	37%	Alexander Stewart	22,741	56%		John F. Miles	People's	2,187	5%		John J. Sherman	Prohibition	785	2%	
1896	William W. O'Keefe	17,705	37%	Alexander Stewart	30,438	63%											
1898	Wells M. Ruggles	14,373	40%	Alexander Stewart	20,825	58%		Edwin Kerswill	Prohibition	663	2%						
1900	Ernest Schweppe	16,983	33%	Webster E. Brown	33,339	65%		John F. Scott	Prohibition	1,188	2%						
1902	Edward Decker	11,479	41%	Edward S. Minor	15,958	57%		Thomas W. Lomas	Prohibition	518	2%						
1904	B. J. McGrehan	13,124	37%	Edward S. Minor	19,764	58%		J. W. Harris	Socialist	667	2%		C. W. Lomas	Prohibition	450	1%	
1906	Philip A. Badour	8,689	37%	Gustav Küstermann	14,189	61%		Joseph E. Harris	Socialist	547	2%						
1908	Luther Lindauer	15,249	44%	Gustav Küstermann	18,562	54%		Joseph E. Harris	Socialist	788	2%						
1910	Thomas F. Konop	12,140	46%	Gustav Küstermann	12,135	46%		Thomas J. Oliver	Socialist	1,777	7%		Alex McEathron	Prohibition	555	2%	
1912	Thomas F. Konop	16,843	49%	Elmer A. Morse	16,139	46%		James Oliver	Socialist	1,138	3%		Jason L. Sizer	Prohibition	631	2%	
1914	Thomas F. Konop	15,462	51%	John W. Reynolds, Sr.	13,525	45%		Thomas J. Oliver	Socialist	1,157	4%						
1916	Thomas F. Konop	18,078	46%	David G. Classon	20,614	53%		Frederick Nanman	Socialist	576	2%						
1918	Andrew R. McDonald	10,702	40%	David G. Classon	16,352	60%											
1920	Andrew R. McDonald	20,108	37%	David G. Classon	32,027	59%		Harry G. Hanrahan	Socialist	1,933	4%						
1922	(no candidate)			George J. Schneider	35,117	62%		Henry Graass	Independent	22,015	39%						
1924	T. J. Reinert	18,449	29%	George J. Schneider	45,159	71%											
1926	(no candidate)			George J. Schneider	41,498	100%											
1928	James H. McGillan	33,302	39%	George J. Schneider	52,300	60%		Maria I. A. Nelson	Prohibition	967	1%						
1930	(no candidate)			George J. Schneider	43,080	100%											
1932	Miles H. McNally	39,874	43%	James A. Frear	52,680	57%											
1934	Willis E. Donley	20,828	24%	Knute Anderson	20,043	23%		Merlin Hull	Progressive	42,422	50%		Paul Boyd	Socialist	2,279	3%	
1936	Edwin J. Larkin	14,702	19%	(no candidate)				Merlin Hull	Progressive	61,593	81%						
1938	William F. Crane	5,066	6%	Hugh M. Jones	32,375	40%		Merlin Hull	Progressive	42,880	53%						
1940	James E. Hughes	6,763	6%	John R. Nygaard	47,825	41%		Merlin Hull	Progressive	61,009	53%						
1942	Jack E. Joyce	3,448	6%	George H. Hipke	19,972	33%		Merlin Hull	Progressive	37,919	62%						
1944	(no candidate)			(no candidate)				Merlin Hull	Progressive	48,064	99%		Adolph Maassen	Socialist	736	2%	
1946	(no candidate)			Merlin Hull	70,527	99%		Adolph Maassen	Socialist	695	1%						
1948	(no candidate)			Merlin Hull	76,903	99%		Howard C. Hendricks	Socialist	708	1%						
1950	Arthur L. Henning	24,871	29%	Merlin Hull	60,337	71%											
1952	Kent L. Pillsbury	43,437	35%	Merlin Hull	81,258	65%											
1953	Lester Johnson	27,852	57%	Arthur L. Padrutt	21,127	43%											
1954	Lester Johnson	52,485	55%	William E. Owen	42,234	45%											
1956	Lester Johnson	62,476	51%	Arthur L. Peterson	59,024	49%											
1958	Lester Johnson	55,420	63%	Charles A. Hornback	32,425	37%											
1960	Lester Johnson	74,268	57%	Perry M. Hull	57,069	44%											
1962	Lester Johnson	50,025	56%	Dennis B. Danielson	39,955	44%											
1964	James P. Buckley	85,071	45%	Glenn R. Davis	105,332	55%											
1966	James P. Buckley	47,674	36%	Glenn R. Davis	85,297	64%											
1968	Carol E. Baumann	73,891	37%	Glenn R. Davis	126,392	63%											
1970	Fred N. Tabak	78,123	48%	Glenn R. Davis	84,723	52%											
1972	Ralph A. Fine	76,585	37%	Glenn R. Davis	128,230	61%		George Reed	American	4,024	2%						
1974	Lynn Adelman	66,071	45%	Robert W. Kasten, Jr.	77,733	53%		William D. Quirk	American	3,037	2%						
1976	Lynn M. McDonald	84,706	34%	Robert W. Kasten, Jr.	163,791	66%											
1978	Matthew J. Flynn	75,207	39%	F. James Sensenbrenner, Jr.	118,386	61%											
1980	Gary C. Benedict	56,838	22%	F. James Sensenbrenner, Jr.	206,227	78%											
1982	(no candidate)			F. James Sensenbrenner, Jr.	111,503	100%											
1984	John Krause	64,157	26%	F. James Sensenbrenner, Jr.	180,247	73%		Stephen K. Hauser	Constitution	1,306	1%						
1986	Thomas G. Popp	38,636	22%	F. James Sensenbrenner, Jr.	138,766	78%											
1988	Thomas J. Hickey	62,003	25%	F. James Sensenbrenner, Jr.	185,093	75%											
1990	(no candidate)			F. James Sensenbrenner, Jr.	117,967	100%											
1992	Ingrid K. Buxton	77,362	28%	F. James Sensenbrenner, Jr.	192,898	70%		David E. Marlow	Independent	4,619	2%		Jeffrey Holt Millikin	Libertarian	1,881	1%	*
1994	(no candidate)			F. James Sensenbrenner, Jr.	141,617	100%	*										
1996	Floyd Brenholt	67,740	25%	F. James Sensenbrenner, Jr.	197,910	74%	*										
1998	(no candidate)			F. James Sensenbrenner, Jr.	175,533	91%		Jeffrey M. Gonyo	Independent	16,419	9%	*					
2000	Mike Clawson	83,720	26%	F. James Sensenbrenner, Jr.	239,498	74%	*										

Write-in and minor candidate notes: In 1886, write-ins received 50 votes. In 1888, write-ins received 122 votes. In 1890, George Wilbur Peck received 25 votes as a write-in. In 1992, write-ins received 27 votes. In 1994, write-ins received 336 votes. In 1996, write-ins received 225 votes. In 1998, write-ins received 368 votes. In 2000, write-ins received 237 votes.
