= Dennis B. Danielson =

American politician

Dennis B. Danielson (January 29, 1921 - February 19, 1972) was a member of the Wisconsin State Assembly.

== Biography ==
Danielson was born on January 29, 1921, in Dunn County, Wisconsin. During World War II, he served in the United States Navy, reaching the rank of lieutenant commander.

Danielson graduated from the University of Wisconsin-Eau Claire and the University of Wisconsin School of Law. He died on February 19, 1972.

== Political career ==
Danielson was a member of the assembly from 1957 to 1958. In 1962, he ran for the United States House of Representatives from Wisconsin's 9th congressional district, losing to Lester Johnson. He was a Republican.
