= Webster E. Brown =

American politician (1851–1929)

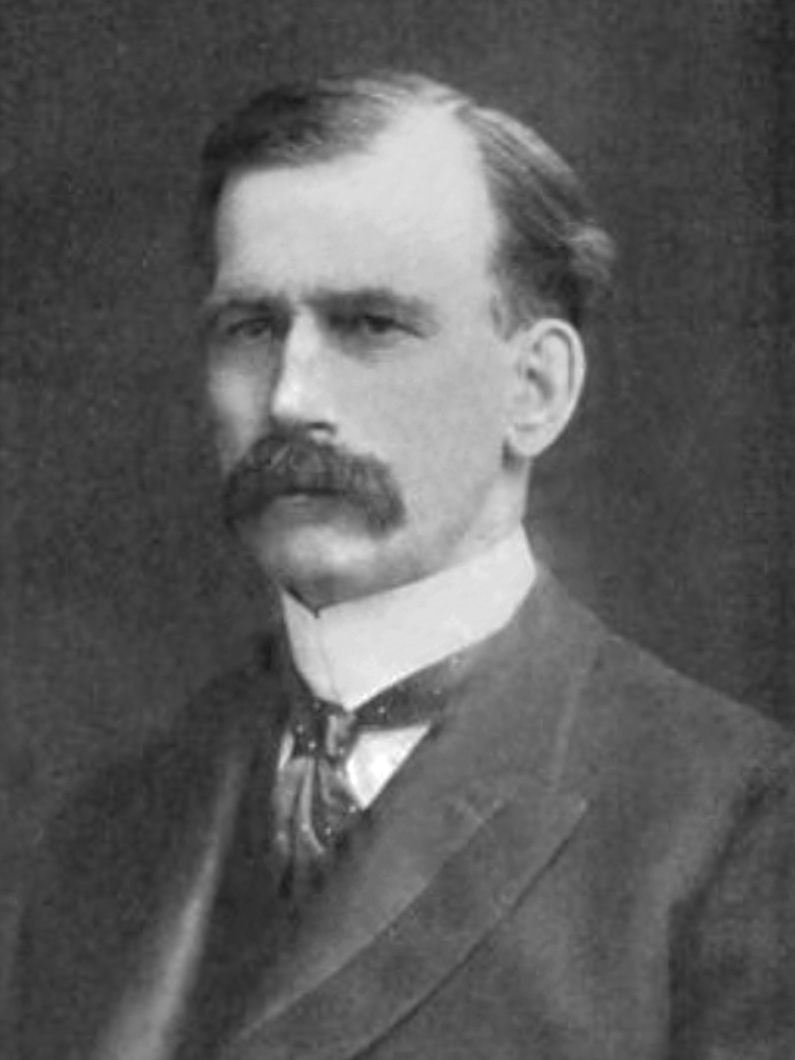

Member of the U.S. House of Representatives from Wisconsin
- In office March 4, 1901 – March 3, 1907
- Preceded by: Alexander Stewart (9th); John J. Jenkins (10th)
- Succeeded by: Edward S. Minor (9th); Elmer A. Morse (10th)
- Constituency: 9th district (1901-03); 10th district (1903-07)

Personal details
- Born: July 16, 1851 Peterboro, New York, U.S.
- Died: December 14, 1929 (aged 78) Chicago, Illinois, U.S.
- Party: Republican

Webster Everett Brown (July 16, 1851 – December 14, 1929) was a U.S. representative from Wisconsin.

Born near Peterboro, New York, in Madison County, Brown moved with his parents to Wisconsin in 1857. Resided for a time in Newport, Columbia County, and then in Hull and Stockton, Portage County. He attended the common schools. He completed a preparatory course at Lawrence University, Appleton, Wisconsin, and later, in 1870, a business course at the Spencerian Business College, in Milwaukee, Wisconsin. He graduated from the University of Wisconsin–Madison in 1874. He engaged in the logging and lumber business in Stevens Point, Wisconsin, in 1875. He moved to Rhinelander, Wisconsin, in 1882 and continued in the logging and lumber business. He also engaged in manufacture of paper. He served as mayor of Rhinelander in 1894 and 1895.

Brown was elected as a Republican to the Fifty-seventh, Fifty-eighth, and Fifty-ninth Congresses (March 4, 1901 – March 3, 1907). He was elected as the representative of Wisconsin's 9th congressional district for the Fifty-seventh Congress, but redistricted and was elected to represent Wisconsin's 10th district for the next two congresses. He served as chairman of the Committee on Mines and Mining (Fifty-eighth and Fifty-ninth Congresses). He was not a candidate for renomination in 1906. He resumed his former business and manufacturing pursuits in Rhinelander, Wisconsin. He died in Chicago, Illinois, while on a visit for medical treatment, December 14, 1929. He was interred in Forest Home Cemetery, located in Rhinelander, Wisconsin.

== Sources ==
- United States Congress. "Webster E. Brown (id: B000946)". Biographical Directory of the United States Congress.

U.S. House of Representatives
| Preceded by Alexander Stewart | Member of the U.S. House of Representatives from Wisconsin's 9th congressional district March 4, 1901 – March 3, 1903 | Succeeded by Edward S. Minor |
| Preceded by John J. Jenkins | Member of the U.S. House of Representatives from Wisconsin's 10th congressional district March 4, 1903 – March 3, 1907 | Succeeded by Elmer A. Morse |
