= David G. Classon =

American politician (1870–1930)

The Honorable David G. Classon
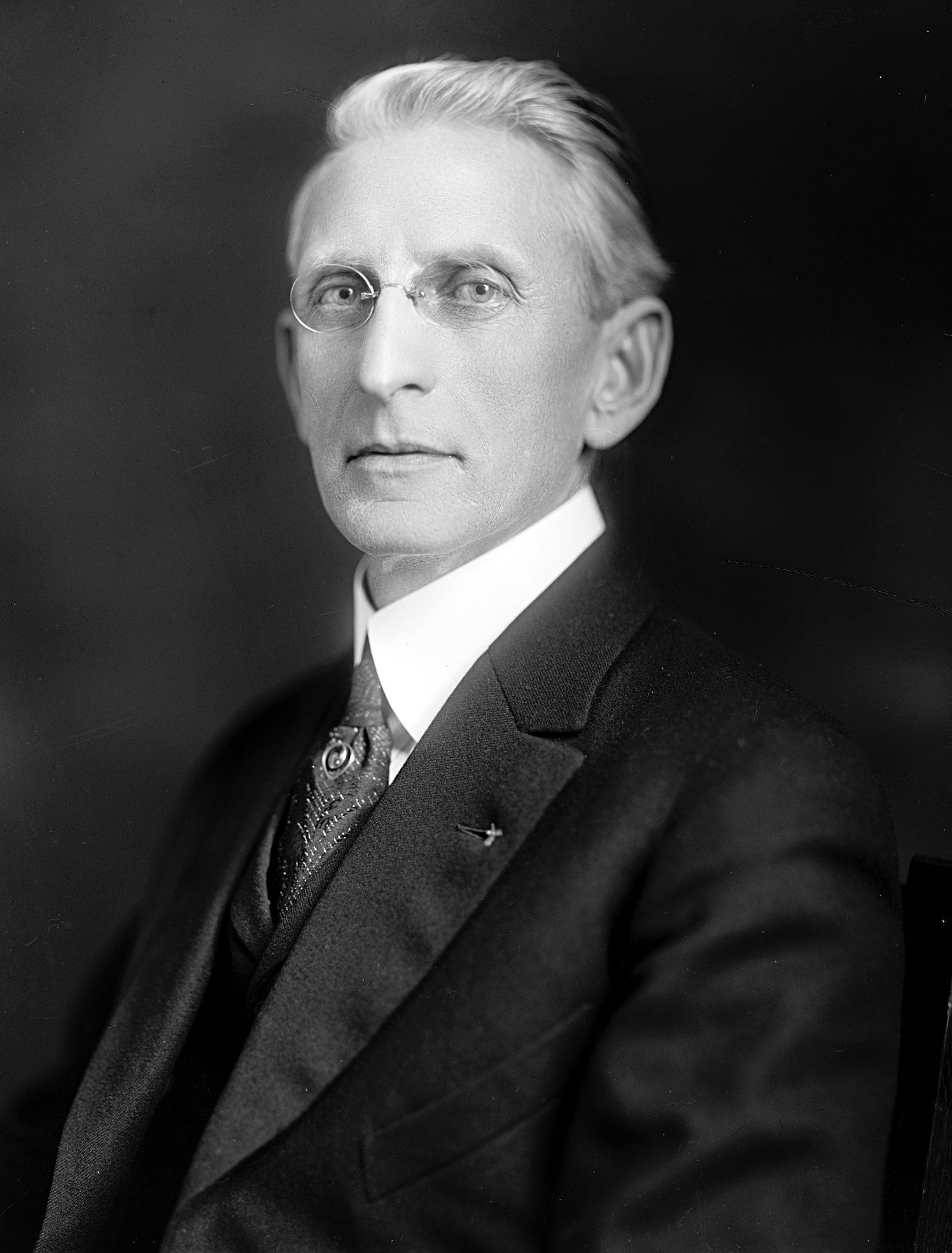

Member of the U.S. House of Representatives from Wisconsin's 9th district
- In office March 4, 1917 – March 3, 1923
- Preceded by: Thomas F. Konop
- Succeeded by: George J. Schneider

Wisconsin Circuit Court Judge for the 20th Circuit
- In office 1928 – January 1, 1930
- Appointed by: Fred R. Zimmerman
- Preceded by: William B. Quinlan
- Succeeded by: Arold Francis Murphy

Personal details
- Born: David Guy Classon; September 27, 1870 Oconto, Wisconsin, U.S.
- Died: September 6, 1930 (aged 59) Oconto, Wisconsin, U.S.
- Resting place: Evergreen Cemetery; Oconto, Wisconsin
- Party: Republican
- Spouses: Myrtle Leila Orr; (died 1931)
- Children: 4

David Guy Classon (September 27, 1870 – September 6, 1930) was an American lawyer and politician. He represented Wisconsin's 9th congressional district in the United States House of Representatives for three terms.

== Biography ==
David G. Classon was born in Oconto, Wisconsin. He attended the public schools, and graduated from the law department of the University of Wisconsin–Madison in 1891, earning his LL.B. He was admitted to the bar the same year and commenced practice in Oconto. He was elected county judge of Oconto County, Wisconsin, from 1894 to 1898, and was then elected Mayor of Oconto from 1898 to 1900. After his two terms as mayor, he served as City attorney from 1900 to 1906, as president of the board of education in 1912 and 1913, and as president of the board of fire and police commissioners in 1915 and 1916.

In 1916, Classon was elected as a Republican to represent Wisconsin's 9th congressional district in the Sixty-fifth Congress, defeating Democratic incumbent Thomas F. Konop. He was then re-elected to the Sixty-sixth, and Sixty-seventh Congresses, serving until March 3, 1923. In Congress, he was one of the two Wisconsin congressmen who voted in favor of the declaration of war with Germany during World War I, out of the eleven members of the Wisconsin delegation. He was opposed to prohibition.

He declined to be a candidate for renomination in 1922. He resumed the practice of law in Oconto, Wisconsin. After returning to Oconto, he served as circuit judge of the 20th circuit (1928–1930), filling the unexpired term of William B. Quinlan. He died at his home in Oconto, Wisconsin, on September 6, 1930. He was interred in Evergreen Cemetery.

== Electoral history ==
U.S. House of Representatives, Wisconsin 9th District election, 1916
Party	Candidate	Votes	%	±%
General Election, November 7, 1916
Republican	David G. Classon	20,614	52.50%	+7.63%
Democratic	Thomas F. Konop (incumbent)	18,078	46.04%	−5.26%
Socialist	Frederick Nanman	576	1.47%	
	Scattering	1	0.00%	
Total votes		'39,269'	'100.0%'	+30.27%
Republican gain from Democratic				

U.S. House of Representatives, Wisconsin 9th District election, 1918
Party	Candidate	Votes	%	±%
General Election, November 5, 1916
Republican	David G. Classon (incumbent)	16,352	60.43%	+7.93%
Democratic	Andrew R. McDonald	10,702	39.55%	−6.49%
	Scattering	7	0.03%	
Total votes		'27,061'	'100.0%'	-31.09%
Republican hold				

U.S. House of Representatives, Wisconsin 9th District election, 1920
Party	Candidate	Votes	%	±%
General Election, November 2, 1916
Republican	David G. Classon (incumbent)	32,027	59.23%	−1.20%
Democratic	Andrew R. McDonald	20,108	37.19%	−2.36%
Socialist	Harry G. Hanrahan	1,933	3.57%	
	Scattering	3	0.01%	
Total votes		'27,061'	'100.0%'	-31.09%
Republican hold				

== Other sources ==
- United States Congress. "David G. Classon (id: C000474)". Biographical Directory of the United States Congress.

U.S. House of Representatives
Preceded by Thomas F. Konop	Member of the U.S. House of Representatives from Wisconsin's 9th congressional district March 4, 1917 - March 3, 1923	Succeeded by George J. Schneider
