= Embassy of Luxembourg, Washington, D.C. =

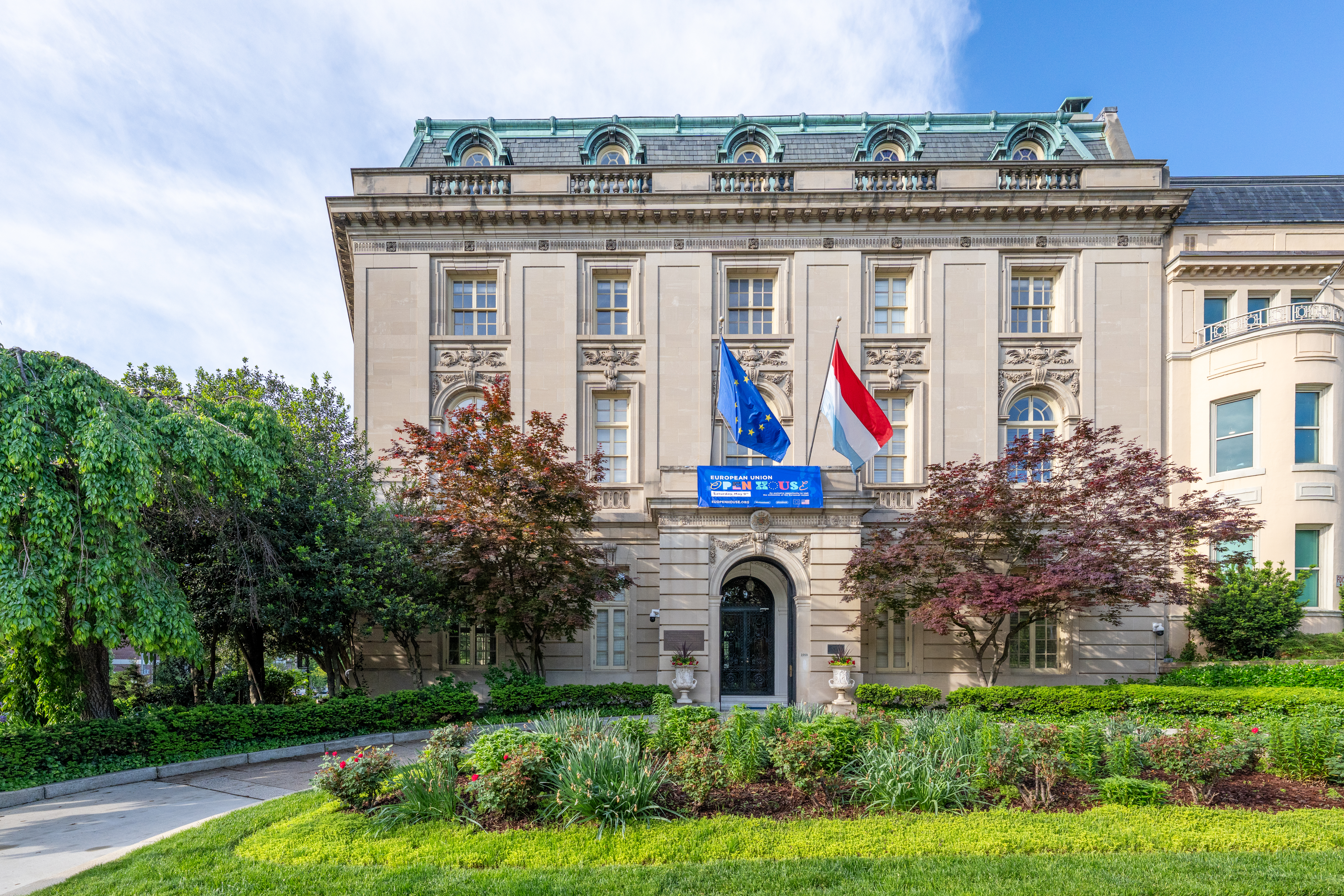
- Location: Washington, D.C.
- Address: 2200 Massachusetts Avenue, N.W.
- Coordinates: 38°54′40.7″N 77°2′56.9″W
- Ambassador: Nicole Bintner-Bakshian

The Embassy of Luxembourg in Washington, D.C., is the diplomatic mission of the Grand Duchy of Luxembourg to the United States. It is located in an ornate manor at 2200 Massachusetts Avenue, NW on Embassy Row.

The embassy is accredited on a non-residential basis to Mexico (with a consulate in Mexico City) and Nicaragua. It was also formerly accredited to Canada, until the opening of the resident Luxembourgish embassy in Ottawa in late 2024.

The current ambassador is Nicole Bintner-Bakshian.

== Building ==
The building was originally constructed for lumber baron and former Congressman Alexander Stewart in 1909. It was designed by Jules Henri de Sibour and built in the French style of Louis XIV. Stewart died in 1912 and his widow lived in the building until her death in 1931. In 1941, her daughter sold it to Grand Duchess Charlotte of Luxembourg who was then in exile due to the German occupation of her country in the Second World War. It was bought by the government of Luxembourg in 1962 and has been home to the embassy ever since. The building was refurbished and renovated in 2003.

== See also ==
- List of ambassadors from Luxembourg to the United States
- List of diplomatic missions of Luxembourg
- List of diplomatic missions in Washington, D.C.
