= 2010 United States House of Representatives elections in Wisconsin =

- November 2, 2010

All 8 Wisconsin seats to the United States House of Representatives
| | Majority party | Minority party |
|---|---|---|
| Party | Republican | Democratic |
| Last election | 3 | 5 |
| Seats won | 5 | 3 |
| Seat change | ▲2 | ▼2 |
| Popular vote | 1,165,761 | 938,690 |
| Percentage | 54.46% | 43.85% |
| Swing | ▲8.52% | ▼6.00% |

Republican
40–50%
50–60%
60–70%
70–80%
Democratic
40–50%
50–60%
60–70%
80–90%

The 2010 congressional elections in Wisconsin were held on November 2, 2010, to determine who would represent the state of Wisconsin in the United States House of Representatives. It coincided with the state's senatorial and gubernatorial elections. Representatives were elected for two-year terms; those elected would serve in the 112th Congress from January 2011 until January 2013. Wisconsin has eight seats in the House, apportioned according to the 2000 United States census.

== Overview ==
United States House of Representatives elections in Wisconsin, 2010
| Party | Votes | Percentage | Seats | +/– |
|---|---|---|---|---|
| Republican | 1,165,761 | 54.46% | 5 | +2 |
| Democratic | 938,690 | 43.85% | 3 | -2 |
| Libertarian | 4,311 | 0.20% | 0 | - |
| Independents | 31,720 | 1.48% | 0 | - |
| Totals | 2,140,482 | 100.00% | 8 | — |

=== By district ===
Results of the 2010 United States House of Representatives elections in Wisconsin by district:

| District | Republican | | Democratic | | Others | | Total | | Result |
| District | Votes | % | Votes | % | Votes | % | Votes | % | Result |
|---|---|---|---|---|---|---|---|---|---|
| District 1 | 179,819 | 68.24% | 79,363 | 30.12% | 4,311 | 1.64% | 263,493 | 100.00% | Republican hold |
| District 2 | 118,099 | 38.19% | 191,164 | 61.81% | 0 | 0.00% | 309,263 | 100.00% | Democratic hold |
| District 3 | 116,838 | 46.51% | 126,380 | 50.31% | 8,001 | 3.18% | 251,219 | 100.00% | Democratic hold |
| District 4 | 61,543 | 29.60% | 143,559 | 69.05% | 2,802 | 1.35% | 207,904 | 100.00% | Democratic hold |
| District 5 | 229,642 | 69.36% | 90,634 | 27.37% | 10,813 | 3.27% | 331,089 | 100.00% | Republican hold |
| District 6 | 183,271 | 70.71% | 75,926 | 29.29% | 0 | 0.00% | 259,197 | 100.00% | Republican hold |
| District 7 | 132,551 | 52.19% | 113,018 | 44.50% | 8,397 | 3.31% | 253,966 | 100.00% | Republican gain |
| District 8 | 143,998 | 54.83% | 118,646 | 45.17% | 0 | 0.00% | 262,644 | 100.00% | Republican gain |
| Total | 1,165,761 | 54.49% | 938,690 | 43.88% | 34,924 | 1.63% | 2,139,375 | 100.00% | |

== District 1 ==
2010 Wisconsin's 1st congressional district election
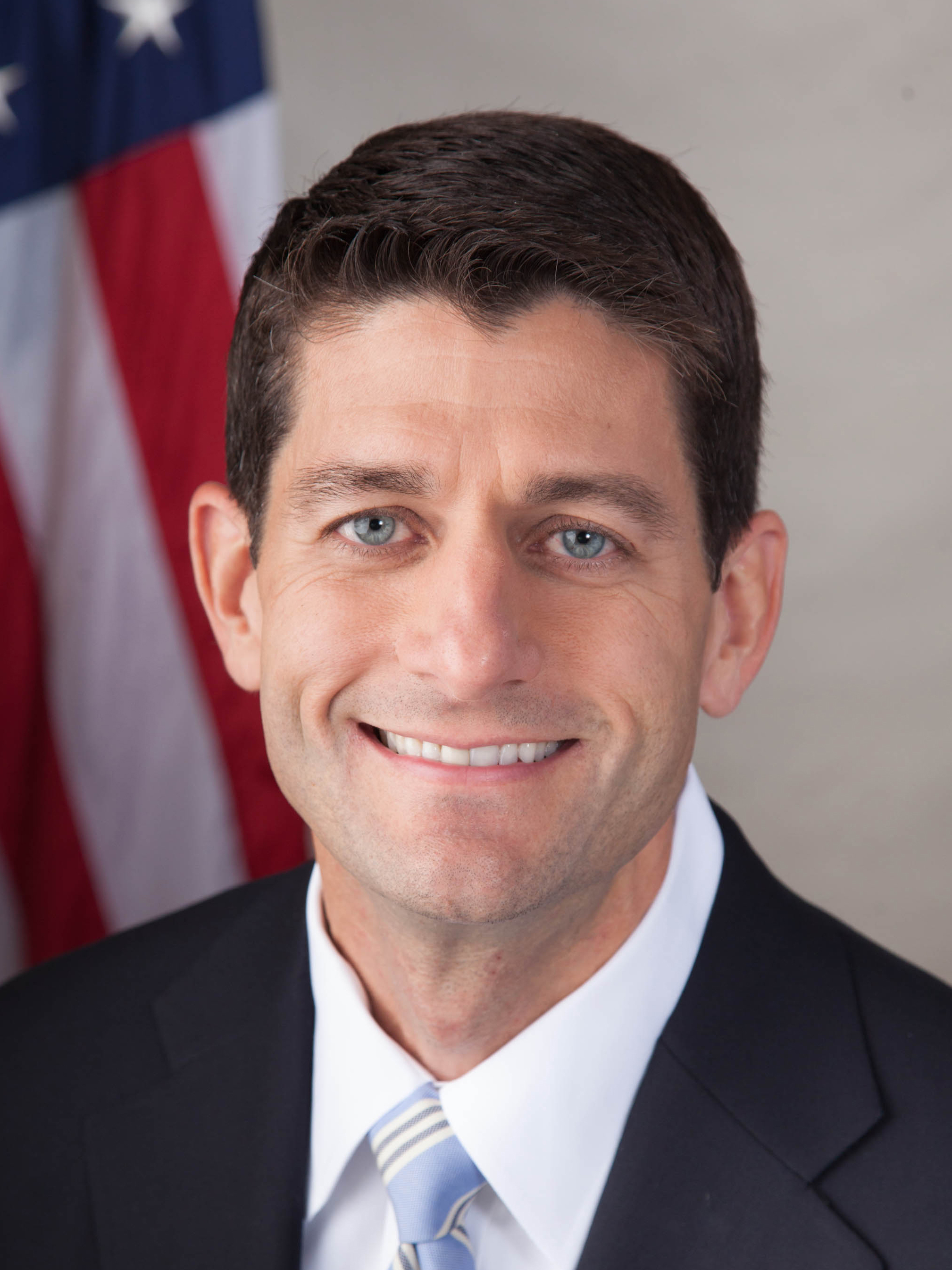

| Nominee | Paul Ryan | John Heckenlively |
| Party | Republican | Democratic |
| Popular vote | 179,819 | 79,363 |
| Percentage | 68.21% | 30.10% |
- Precinct results Ryan: 40–50% 50–60% 60–70% 70–80% 80–90% >90% Heckenlively: 40–50% 50–60% 60–70% 70–80% 80–90% Tie: 40–50% 50% No votes
U.S. Representative before election
Paul Ryan
Republican
Elected U.S. Representative
Paul Ryan
Republican

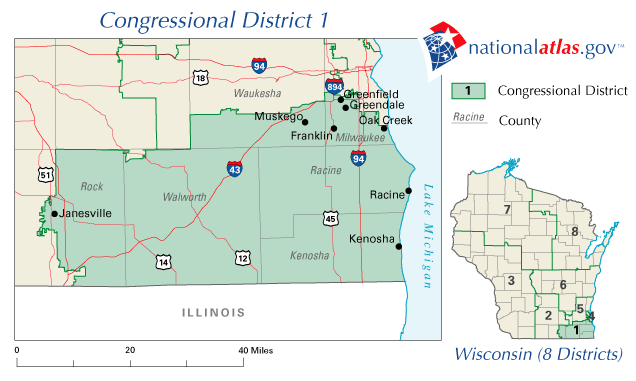

Incumbent Republican Congressman Paul Ryan ran for a seventh term in this marginally conservative district based in southeastern Wisconsin. Congressman Ryan faced a nominal challenge from Democratic businessman John Heckenlively and Libertarian Joseph Kexel.

The Wisconsin State Journal sharply criticized Congressman Ryan, labeling him "a singularly ineffective representative" and lambasted his plans to privatize Social Security and Medicare, noting, "even the most anti-government extremists recognize that gambling America’s retirement security on the stock market is madness." The State Journal called for voters to vote for challenger Heckenlively, with the rationale that he "will fight for the interests of southeastern Wisconsin working families the incumbent has so neglected.

=== Predictions ===
| Source | Ranking | As of |
|---|---|---|
| The Cook Political Report | Safe R | November 1, 2010 |
| Rothenberg | Safe R | November 1, 2010 |
| Sabato's Crystal Ball | Safe R | November 1, 2010 |
| RCP | Safe R | November 1, 2010 |
| CQ Politics | Safe R | October 28, 2010 |
| New York Times | Safe R | November 1, 2010 |
| FiveThirtyEight | Safe R | November 1, 2010 |

Wisconsin's 1st congressional district election, 2010
| Party | Candidate | Votes | % |
|---|---|---|---|
| Republican | Paul Ryan (inc.) | 179,819 | 68.21 |
| Democratic | John Heckenlively | 79,363 | 30.10 |
| Libertarian | Joseph Kexel | 4,311 | 1.64 |
| Write-ins | | 134 | 0.05 |
| Total votes | | 263,627 | 100.00 |
| Republican hold | | | |

== District 2 ==
2010 Wisconsin's 2nd congressional district election
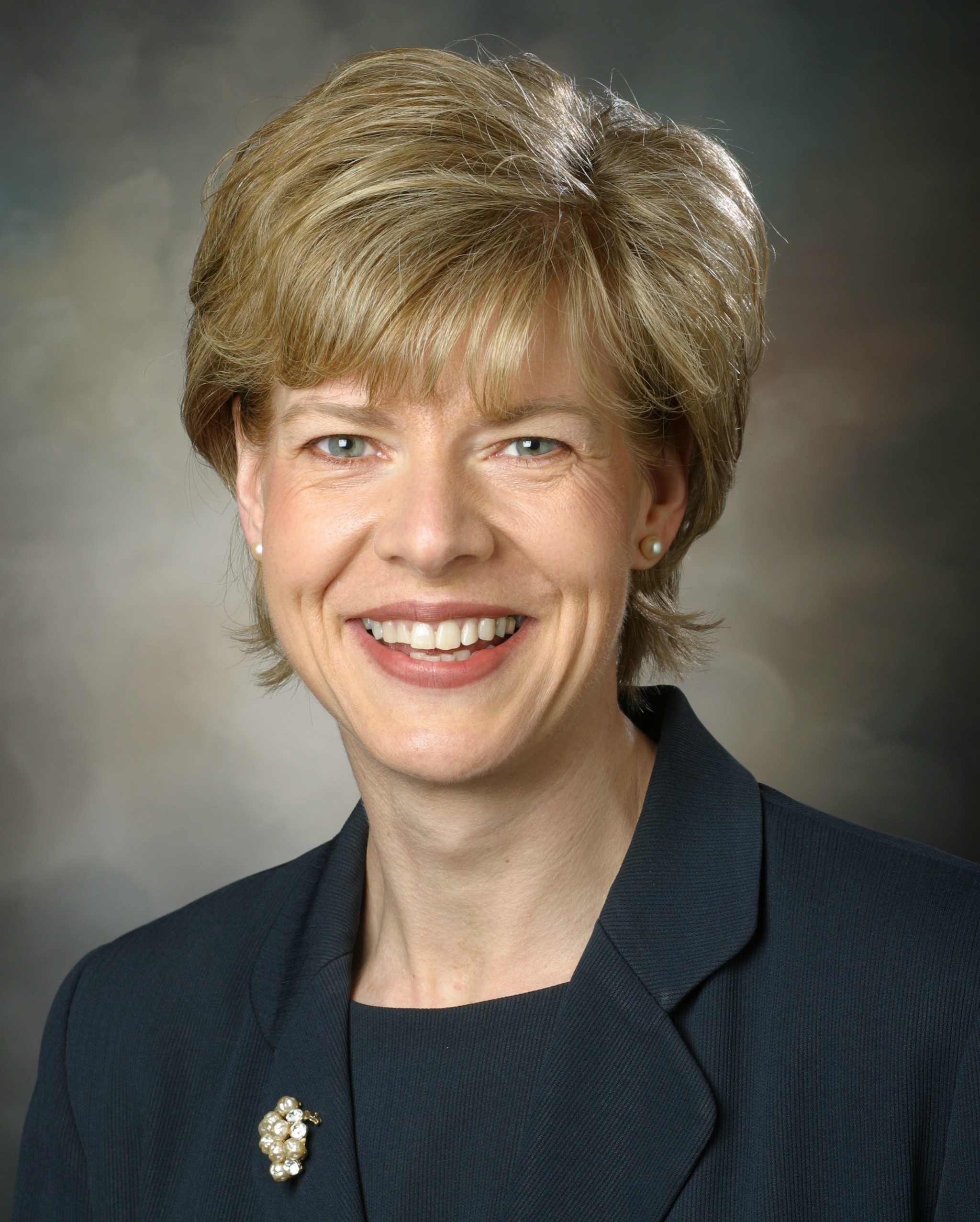

| Nominee | Tammy Baldwin | Chad Lee |
| Party | Democratic | Republican |
| Popular vote | 191,164 | 118,099 |
| Percentage | 61.77% | 38.16% |
- Precinct results Baldwin: 40–50% 50–60% 60–70% 70–80% 80–90% >90% Lee: 40–50% 50–60% 60–70% 70–80% 80–90% Tie: 40–50% 50% No votes
U.S. Representative before election
Tammy Baldwin
Democratic
Elected U.S. Representative
Tammy Baldwin
Democratic

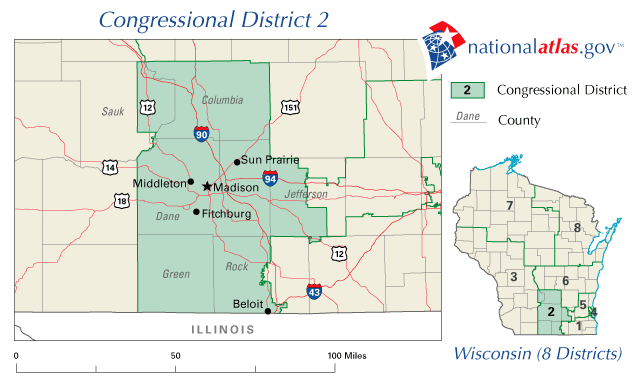

Incumbent Democratic Congresswoman Tammy Baldwin, one of the few openly gay members of Congress, ran for a seventh term from this solidly liberal district based around the city of Madison, and she faced Republican candidate Chad Lee in the general election.

The Capital Times gave Congresswoman Baldwin glowing praise, observing that she "has eschewed the celebrity circuit and focused on heavy lifting in Washington and tending to the needs of her constituents in south-central Wisconsin’s 2nd district," calling the results of her work "impressive." Ultimately, the Capital Times concluded, "Baldwin’s service merits an enthusiastic endorsement, and she has it from us."

=== Predictions ===
| Source | Ranking | As of |
|---|---|---|
| The Cook Political Report | Safe D | November 1, 2010 |
| Rothenberg | Safe D | November 1, 2010 |
| Sabato's Crystal Ball | Safe D | November 1, 2010 |
| RCP | Safe D | November 1, 2010 |
| CQ Politics | Safe D | October 28, 2010 |
| New York Times | Safe D | November 1, 2010 |
| FiveThirtyEight | Safe D | November 1, 2010 |

Wisconsin's 2nd congressional district election, 2010
| Party | Candidate | Votes | % |
|---|---|---|---|
| Democratic | Tammy Baldwin (inc.) | 191,164 | 61.77 |
| Republican | Chad Lee | 118,099 | 38.16 |
| Write-ins | | 197 | 0.06 |
| Total votes | | 309,460 | 100.00 |
| Democratic hold | | | |

== District 3 ==
2010 Wisconsin's 3rd congressional district election
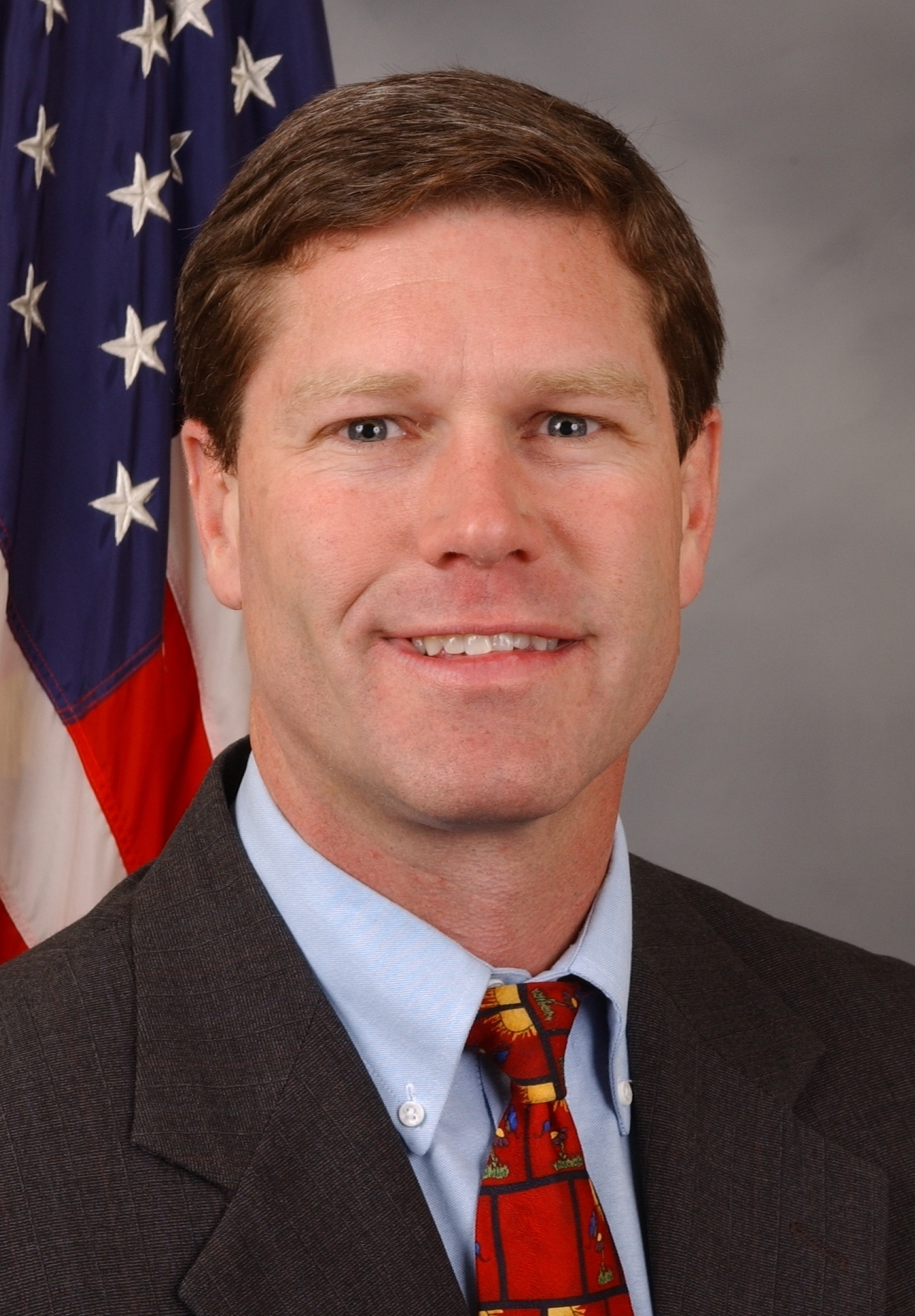

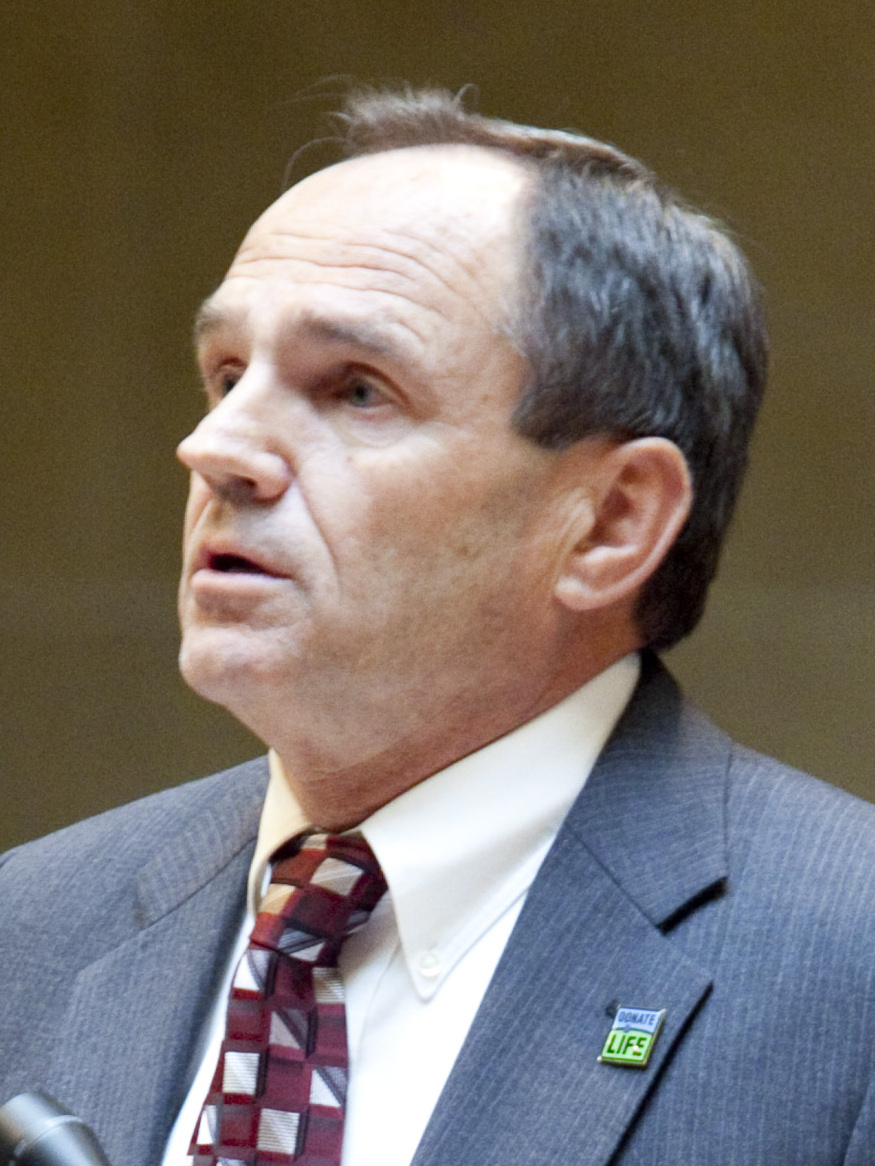
| Nominee | Ron Kind | Dan Kapanke |
| Party | Democratic | Republican |
| Popular vote | 126,380 | 116,838 |
| Percentage | 50.3% | 46.5% |
- Kind: 40–50% 50–60% 60–70% 70–80% 80–90% Kapanke: 40–50% 50–60% 60–70% 70–80% 80–90% Tie: 40–50% 50% No votes
U.S. Representative before election
Ron Kind
Democratic
Elected U.S. Representative
Ron Kind
Democratic

The 3rd district spans the Driftless Area in southwestern Wisconsin taking in cities such as Eau Claire and La Crosse. The incumbent was Democrat Ron Kind, who was reelected with 63.19% of the vote in 2008.

=== Democratic primary ===
==== Nominee ====
- Ron Kind, incumbent U.S. Representative

==== Results ====
Democratic primary results
| Party | Candidate | Votes | % |
|---|---|---|---|
| Democratic | Ron Kind (incumbent) | 24,514 | 99.79 |
| Write-in | | 51 | 0.21 |
| Total votes | | 24,565 | 100.0 |

=== Republican primary ===
==== Candidates ====
===== Nominee =====
- Dan Kapanke, State Senator from the 32nd district (2005–2011)

===== Eliminated in primary =====
- Bruce F. Evers

==== Results ====
Republican primary results
| Party | Candidate | Votes | % |
|---|---|---|---|
| Republican | Dan Kapanke | 41,216 | 76.94 |
| Republican | Bruce F. Evers | 12,312 | 22.98 |
| Write-in | | 42 | 0.08 |
| Total votes | | 53,570 | 100.0 |

=== General election ===
==== Campaign ====
Democratic Congressman Ron Kind faced Republican State Senator Dan Kapanke in his bid for an eighth term from this liberal-leaning congressional district based that includes much of western Wisconsin. The campaign between Kapanke and Kind was brutal, with Kapanke and the National Republican Congressional Committee accusing Kind of charging two doctors in exchange for meeting with them to discuss a bill, a claim that Kind countered with allegations that Kapanke used $32,000 from a charity to improve a baseball stadium. In their debate, Kapanke attacked Kind for having supported much of President Obama's agenda.

The Milwaukee Journal Sentinel endorsed Congressman Kind for re-election, noting, "Kind is a partisan with principles instead of someone who is principally, to the virtual exclusion of reasoned compromise, partisan." The Wisconsin State Journal criticized both Kind and Kapanke, noting that while they were "unimpressed with...Ron Kind" and that Kapanke was "scandal-plagued," Kind "is preferable to his...challenger."

==== Predictions ====
| Source | Ranking | As of |
|---|---|---|
| The Cook Political Report | Lean D | November 1, 2010 |
| Rothenberg | Likely D | November 1, 2010 |
| Sabato's Crystal Ball | Likely D | November 1, 2010 |
| RCP | Tossup | November 1, 2010 |
| CQ Politics | Lean D | October 28, 2010 |
| New York Times | Lean D | November 1, 2010 |
| FiveThirtyEight | Likely D | November 1, 2010 |

==== Results ====
Wisconsin's 3rd congressional district election, 2010
| Party | Candidate | Votes | % |
|---|---|---|---|
| Democratic | Ron Kind (inc.) | 126,380 | 50.28 |
| Republican | Dan Kapanke | 116,838 | 46.49 |
| Independent | Michael Krsiean | 8,001 | 3.18 |
| Write-ins | | 121 | 0.05 |
| Total votes | | 251,340 | 100.00 |
| Democratic hold | | | |

== District 4 ==
2010 Wisconsin's 4th congressional district election
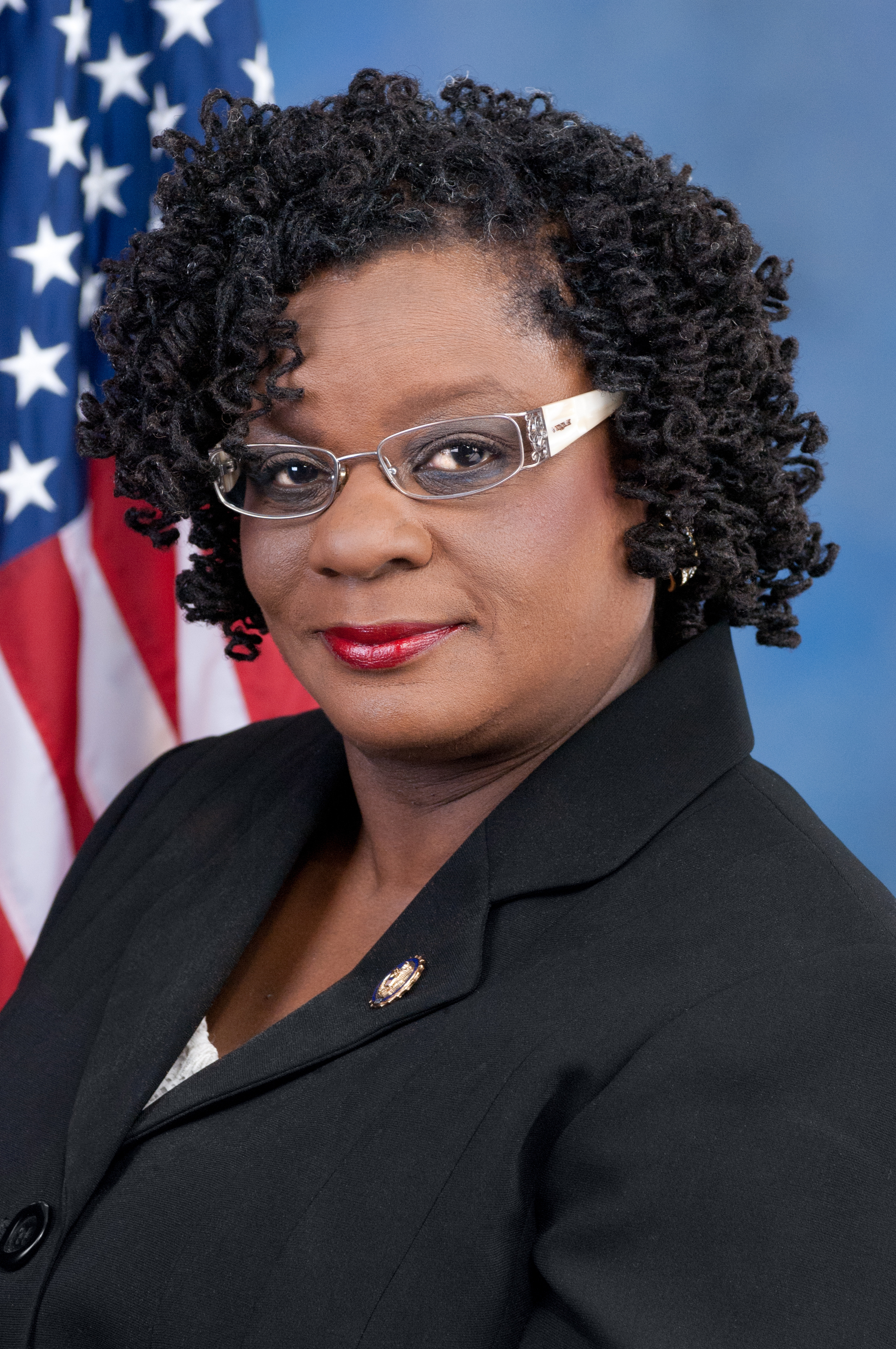

| Nominee | Gwen Moore | Dan Sebring |
| Party | Democratic | Republican |
| Popular vote | 143,559 | 61,543 |
| Percentage | 68.98% | 29.57% |
- Precinct results Moore: 40–50% 50–60% 60–70% 70–80% 80–90% >90% Sebring: 40–50% 50–60% 60–70% 70–80% >90% No votes
U.S. Representative before election
Gwen Moore
Democratic
Elected U.S. Representative
Gwen Moore
Democratic

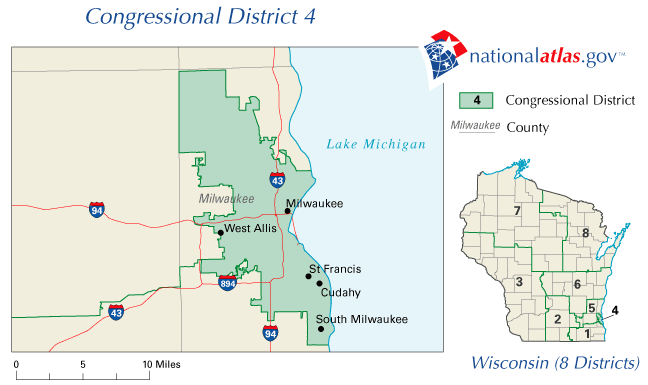

Congresswoman Gwen Moore ran for a fourth term in the 4th district, based largely in the city of Milwaukee. Moore faced Republican candidate Dan Sebring.

The Wisconsin State Journal strongly endorsed Congresswoman Moore in her bid for re-election, calling her "a gem with a terrific voting record and an accessible style that will earn her easy re-election."

=== Predictions ===
| Source | Ranking | As of |
|---|---|---|
| The Cook Political Report | Safe D | November 1, 2010 |
| Rothenberg | Safe D | November 1, 2010 |
| Sabato's Crystal Ball | Safe D | November 1, 2010 |
| RCP | Safe D | November 1, 2010 |
| CQ Politics | Safe D | October 28, 2010 |
| New York Times | Safe D | November 1, 2010 |
| FiveThirtyEight | Safe D | November 1, 2010 |

Wisconsin's 4th congressional district election, 2010
| Party | Candidate | Votes | % |
|---|---|---|---|
| Democratic | Gwen Moore (inc.) | 143,559 | 68.98 |
| Republican | Dan Sebring | 61,543 | 29.57 |
| Independent | Eddie Ahmad Ayyash | 2,802 | 1.35 |
| Write-ins | | 199 | 0.10 |
| Total votes | | 208,103 | 100.00 |
| Democratic hold | | | |

== District 5 ==
2010 Wisconsin's 5th congressional district election
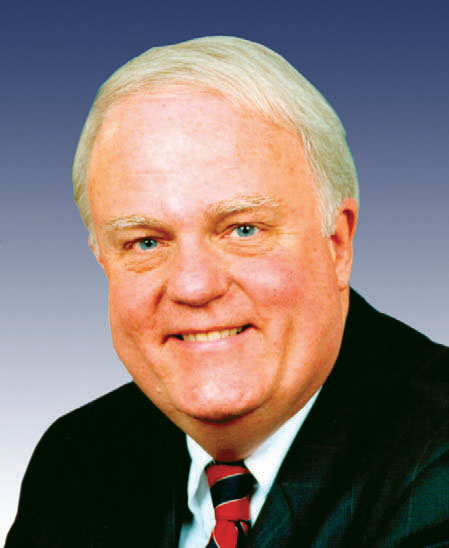

| Nominee | Jim Sensenbrenner | Todd P. Kolosso |
| Party | Republican | Democratic |
| Popular vote | 229,642 | 90,634 |
| Percentage | 69.32% | 27.36% |
- Precinct results Sensenbrenner: 40–50% 50–60% 60–70% 70–80% 80–90% >90% Kolosso: 40–50% 50–60% 60–70% 70–80% 80–90% >90% Tie: 40–50% 50% No votes
U.S. Representative before election
Jim Sensenbrenner
Republican
Elected U.S. Representative
Jim Sensenbrenner
Republican

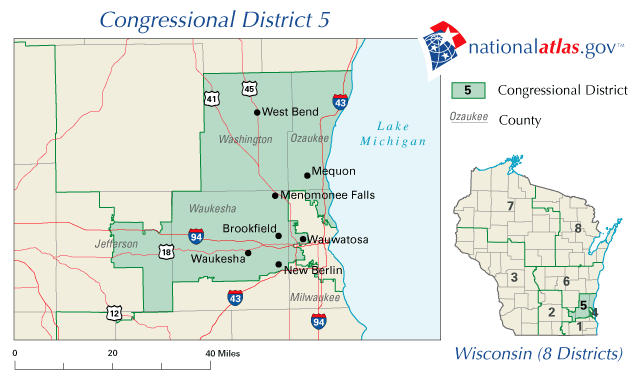

This solidly conservative district based in the northern and western suburbs of Milwaukee, has been represented by Republican Congressman Jim Sensenbrenner since he was first elected in 1978. Running for a seventeenth term, Sensenbrenner faced a nominal challenge from Democratic businessman Todd Kolosso and independent candidate Robert R. Raymond, who had run against the Congressman in previous elections.

The Wisconsin State Journal soured on Congressman Sensenbrenner, calling him "irascible" and announcing that he "has reached his 'sell-by' date." The State Journal endorsed Kolosso, who they claimed "would be a more engaged representative."

=== Predictions ===
| Source | Ranking | As of |
|---|---|---|
| The Cook Political Report | Safe R | November 1, 2010 |
| Rothenberg | Safe R | November 1, 2010 |
| Sabato's Crystal Ball | Safe R | November 1, 2010 |
| RCP | Safe R | November 1, 2010 |
| CQ Politics | Safe R | October 28, 2010 |
| New York Times | Safe R | November 1, 2010 |
| FiveThirtyEight | Safe R | November 1, 2010 |

Wisconsin's 5th congressional district election, 2010
| Party | Candidate | Votes | % |
|---|---|---|---|
| Republican | Jim Sensenbrenner (inc.) | 229,642 | 69.32 |
| Democratic | Todd P. Kolosso | 90,634 | 27.36 |
| Independent | Robert R. Raymond | 10,813 | 3.26 |
| Write-ins | | 169 | 0.05 |
| Total votes | | 331,258 | 100.00 |
| Republican hold | | | |

== District 6 ==
2010 Wisconsin's 6th congressional district election
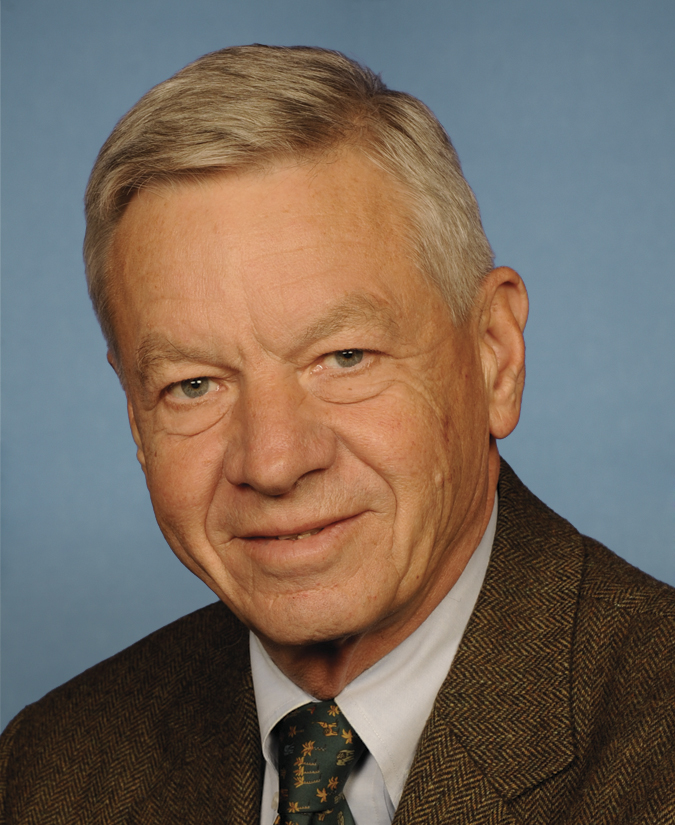

| Nominee | Tom Petri | Joseph C. Kallas |
| Party | Republican | Democratic |
| Popular vote | 183,271 | 75,926 |
| Percentage | 70.66% | 29.27% |
- Precinct results Petri: 40–50% 50–60% 60–70% 70–80% 80–90% >90% Kallas: 40–50% 50–60% Tie: 50% No votes
U.S. Representative before election
Tom Petri
Republican
Elected U.S. Representative
Tom Petri
Republican

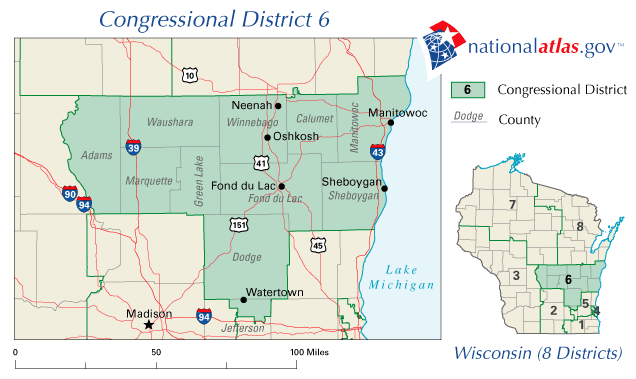

Incumbent Republican Congressman Tom Petri has represented this conservative-leaning district based in east-central Wisconsin since he was first elected in a 1979 special election. Petri built a reputation as a moderate in Congress and was well-liked by the constituents of his district. Though he faced a challenge from Democratic candidate Joseph Kallas, Petri was in no real danger of losing his seat.

The Wisconsin State Journal has high praise for Congressman Petri, referring to him as a "moderate...who builds bipartisan coalitions on education issues and brings a thoughtful take to foreign policy debates."

=== Predictions ===
| Source | Ranking | As of |
|---|---|---|
| The Cook Political Report | Safe R | November 1, 2010 |
| Rothenberg | Safe R | November 1, 2010 |
| Sabato's Crystal Ball | Safe R | November 1, 2010 |
| RCP | Safe R | November 1, 2010 |
| CQ Politics | Safe R | October 28, 2010 |
| New York Times | Safe R | November 1, 2010 |
| FiveThirtyEight | Safe R | November 1, 2010 |

Wisconsin's 6thcongressional district election, 2010
| Party | Candidate | Votes | % |
|---|---|---|---|
| Republican | Tom Petri (inc.) | 183,271 | 70.66 |
| Democratic | Joseph C. Kallas | 75,926 | 29.27 |
| Write-ins | | 170 | 0.07 |
| Total votes | | 259,367 | 100.00 |
| Republican hold | | | |

== District 7 ==
2010 Wisconsin's 7th congressional district election
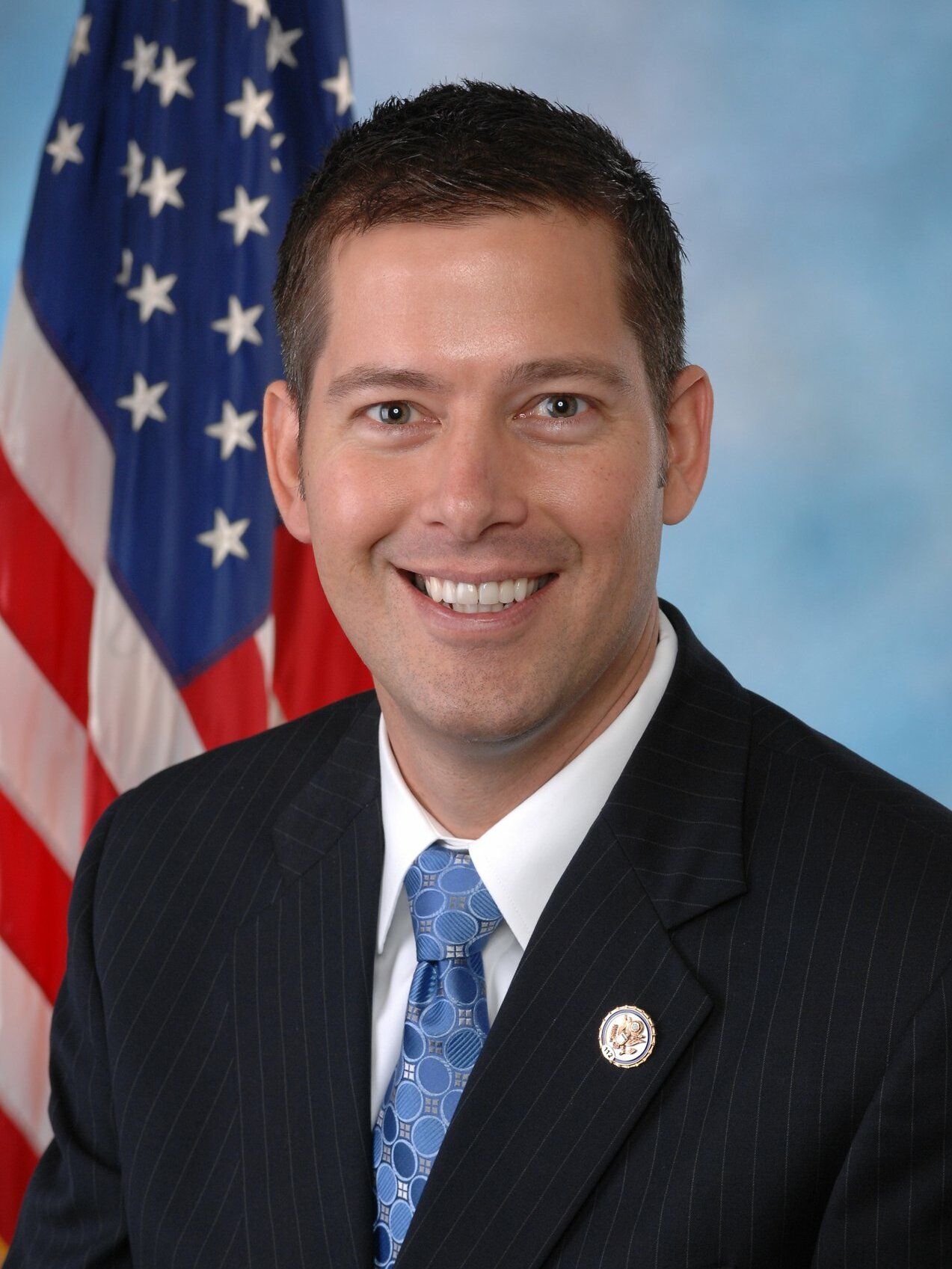

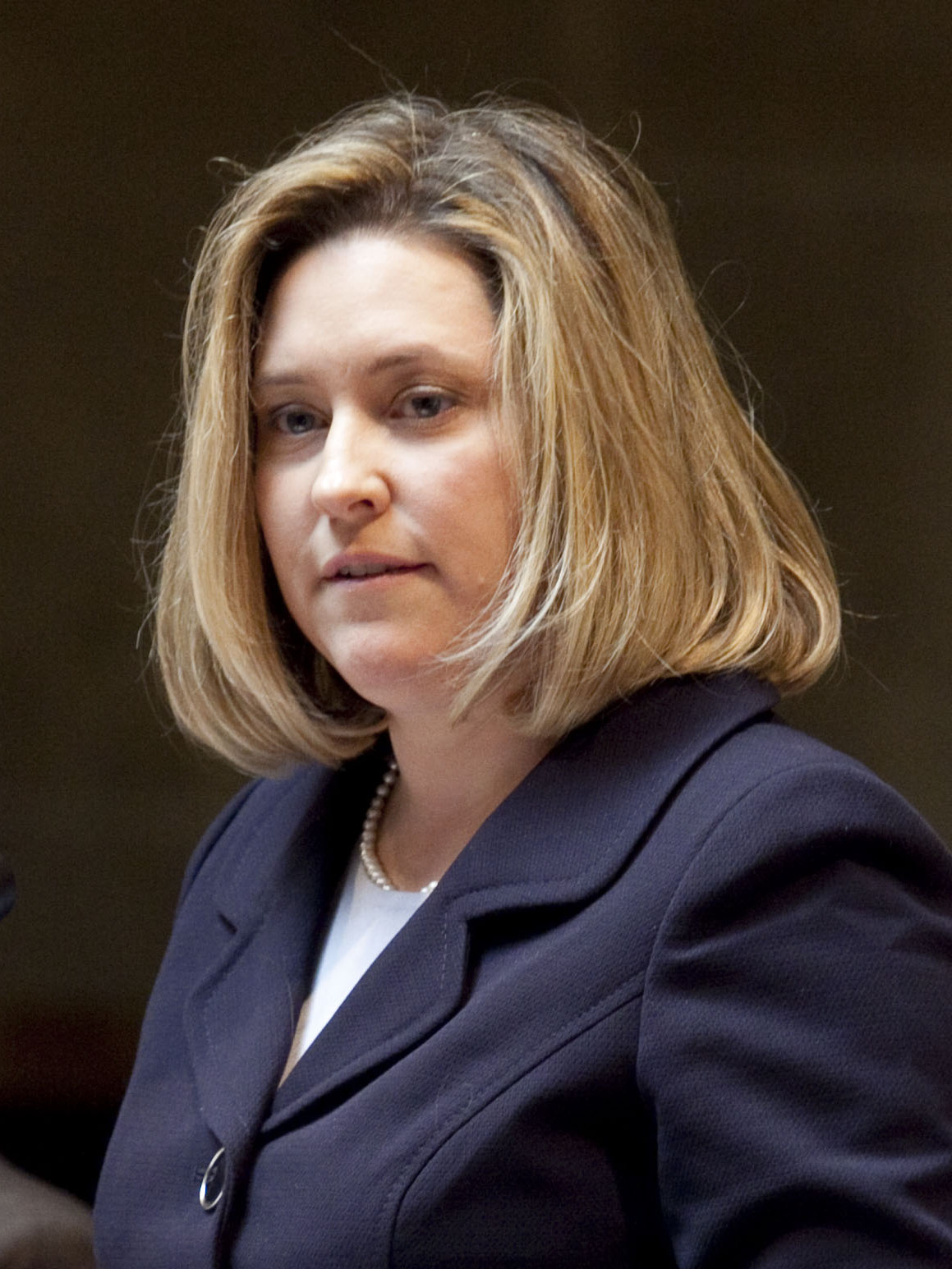
| Nominee | Sean Duffy | Julie Lassa |
| Party | Republican | Democratic |
| Popular vote | 132,551 | 113,018 |
| Percentage | 52.1% | 44.4% |
- Duffy: 30–40% 40–50% 50–60% 60–70% 70–80% 80–90% >90% Lassa: 40–50% 50–60% 60–70% 70–80% 80–90% >90% Tie: 40–50% 50% No votes
U.S. Representative before election
Dave Obey
Democratic
Elected U.S. Representative
Sean Duffy
Republican

=== Democratic primary ===
==== Candidates ====
===== Nominee =====
- Julie Lassa, State Senator from the 24th district (2003–2017)

===== Eliminated in primary =====
- Don Raihala

===== Declined =====
- Dave Obey, incumbent U.S. Representative

==== Results ====
Democratic primary results
| Party | Candidate | Votes | % |
|---|---|---|---|
| Democratic | Julie Lassa | 28,585 | 85.27 |
| Democratic | Don Raihala | 4,920 | 14.68 |
| Write-in | | 16 | 0.05 |
| Total votes | | 33,521 | 100.0 |

=== Republican primary ===
==== Candidates ====
===== Nominee =====
- Sean Duffy, Ashland County District Attorney (2002–2010)

===== Eliminated in primary =====
- Dan Mielke

==== Results ====
Republican primary results
| Party | Candidate | Votes | % |
|---|---|---|---|
| Republican | Sean Duffy | 41,032 | 66.04 |
| Republican | Dan Mielke | 21,074 | 33.92 |
| Write-in | | 25 | 0.04 |
| Total votes | | 62,132 | 100.0 |

=== General election ===
==== Campaign ====
When long-serving Democratic Congressman Dave Obey, the dean of the Wisconsin congressional delegation and the chairman of the House Appropriations Committee, declined to seek another term in this liberal-leaning district based in northwestern Wisconsin. Democratic State Senator Julie Lassa emerged as her party's nominee, while Ashland County District Attorney Sean Duffy, who had starred on MTV’s The Real World: Boston became the Republican nominee. A contentious general election ensued, in which the candidates traded barbs and personal attacks against each other.

Duffy alleged that as a State Senator, Lassa accepted a $2,530 pay increase, even while the state was losing jobs and undergoing a budget deficit. Politifact, however, questioned the accuracy of this attack, noting that Lassa had given back half of the pay increase. Lassa returned fire with a hard-hitting television advertisement alleging that Duffy skimped on his responsibilities as a District Attorney and the quality of his office’s services declined as a result. Politifact again investigated this claim and rated it as "Barely true."

The Milwaukee Journal Sentinel praised both candidates in the race, observing, "both...candidates are a good fit for the district and would make able representatives." They praised Lassa for her "good work on several issues in the legislature," but ultimately endorsed Duffy, calling him, "the kind of independent thinker who might just shake things up in Washington." The Wisconsin State Journal, on the other hand, endorsed Lassa as a "more experienced and a more independent thinker than former MTV star Sean Duffy."

==== Predictions ====
| Source | Ranking | As of |
|---|---|---|
| The Cook Political Report | Tossup | November 1, 2010 |
| Rothenberg | Tilt R (flip) | November 1, 2010 |
| Sabato's Crystal Ball | Lean R (flip) | November 1, 2010 |
| RCP | Lean R (flip) | November 1, 2010 |
| CQ Politics | Tossup | October 28, 2010 |
| New York Times | Tossup | November 1, 2010 |
| FiveThirtyEight | Likely R (flip) | November 1, 2010 |

==== Results ====
Wisconsin's 7th congressional district election, 2010
| Party | Candidate | Votes | % |
|---|---|---|---|
| Republican | Sean Duffy | 132,551 | 52.11 |
| Democratic | Julie Lassa | 113,018 | 44.43 |
| Independent | Gary Kauther | 8,397 | 3.30 |
| Write-ins | | 423 | 0.17 |
| Total votes | | 254,389 | 100.00 |
| Republican gain from Democratic | | Swing | -- |

== District 8 ==
2010 Wisconsin's 8th congressional district election
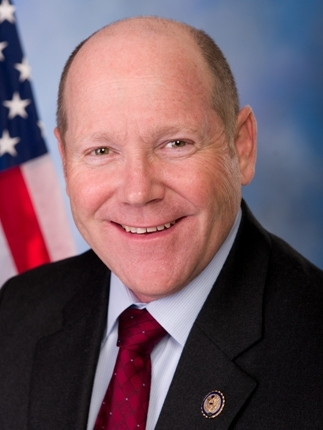

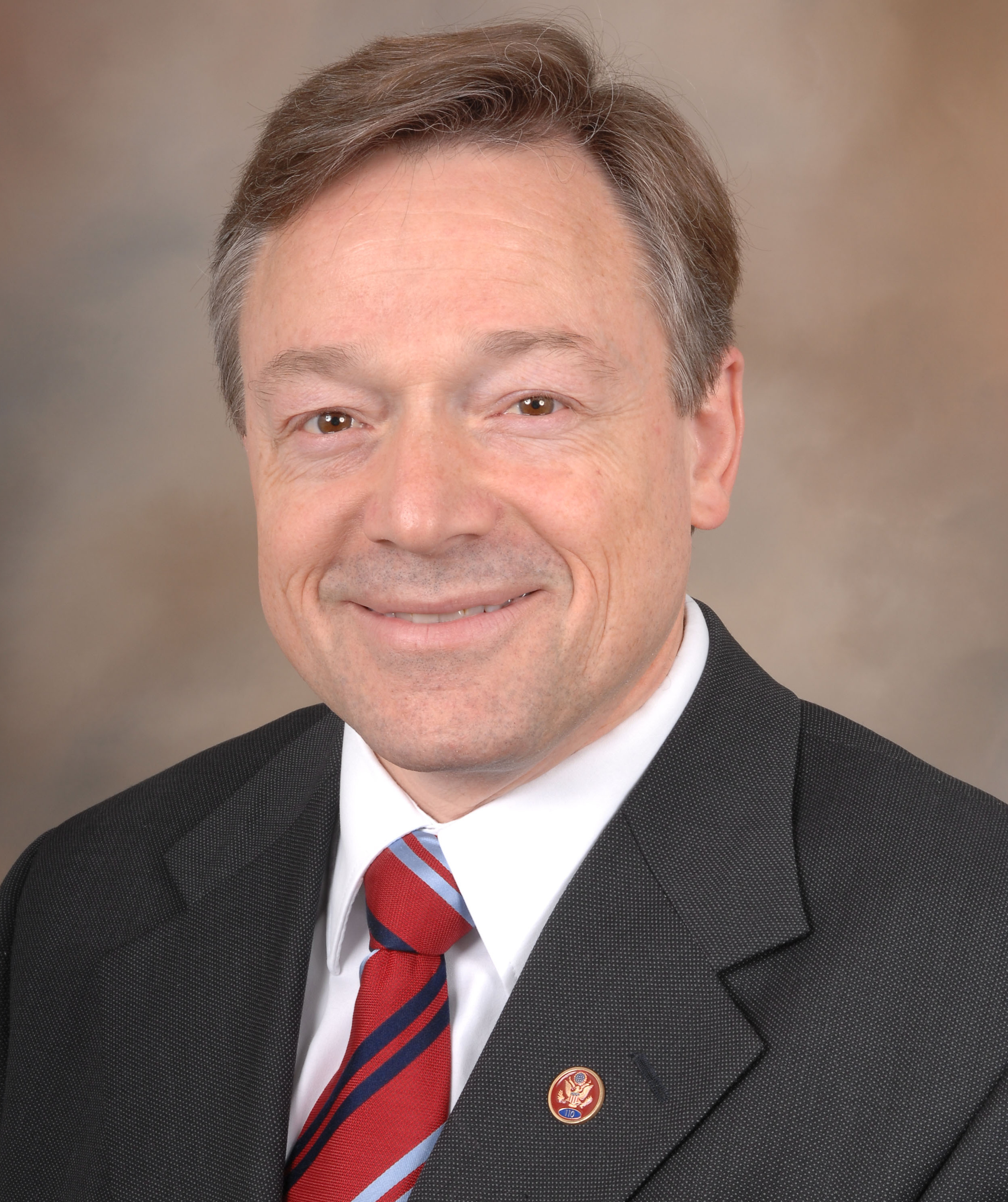
| Nominee | Reid Ribble | Steve Kagen |
| Party | Republican | Democratic |
| Popular vote | 143,998 | 118,646 |
| Percentage | 54.77% | 45.12% |
- Ribble: 40–50% 50–60% 60–70% 70–80% 80–90% >90% Kagen: 40–50% 50–60% 60–70% 70–80% 80–90% >90% Tie: 40–50% 50% No votes
U.S. Representative before election
Steve Kagen
Democratic
Elected U.S. Representative
Reid Ribble
Republican

The 8th district is located in northeastern Wisconsin and includes Green Bay and Appleton. The incumbent was Democrat Steve Kagen, who was reelected with 54% of the vote in 2008.

=== Democratic primary ===
==== Nominee ====
- Steve Kagen, incumbent U.S. Representative

==== Results ====
Democratic primary results
| Party | Candidate | Votes | % |
|---|---|---|---|
| Democratic | Steve Kagen (incumbent) | 23,307 | 99.81 |
| Write-in | | 44 | 0.19 |
| Total votes | | 23,351 | 100.0 |

=== Republican primary ===
==== Candidates ====
===== Nominee =====
- Reid Ribble, De Pere businessman

===== Eliminated in primary =====
- Terri McCormick, former state representative from the 56th district (2001–2007) and candidate for this district in 2006
- Roger Roth, state representative from the 56th district (2007–2011) and nephew of former U.S. representative Toby Roth

===== Withdrawn =====
- Marc Savard, farmer (remained on ballot; endorsed Ribble)

==== Results ====
Primary results by county: Ribble: 30–40%; 40–50%; 50–60%; Roth: 40–50%; 50–60%

Republican primary results
| Party | Candidate | Votes | % |
|---|---|---|---|
| Republican | Reid Ribble | 38,521 | 47.95 |
| Republican | Roger Roth | 25,704 | 32.00 |
| Republican | Terri McCormick | 14,107 | 17.56 |
| Republican | Marc Savard (withdrawn) | 1,968 | 2.45 |
| Write-in | | 36 | 0.04 |
| Total votes | | 80,336 | 100.0 |

=== General election ===
==== Campaign ====
Seeking a third term in this marginally conservative district based in northeastern Wisconsin and the Green Bay metropolitan area, incumbent Democratic Congressman Steve Kagen faced a stiff challenge from Republican Reid Ribble, a roofing contractor and former minister from Kaukauna. Kagen and Ribble engaged in a bitterly fought general election, with Kagen accusing Ribble of wanting to privatize Social Security and Ribble responded by accusing Kagen of sending American jobs to China through his votes in Congress.

The Milwaukee Journal Sentinel had praise for both the Democratic and Republican candidates, describing them as "pragmatic and able, well suited to a district that skews conservative," but ultimately endorsed Congressman Kagen for re-election, observing, "he has a reliably independent streak" and noting that Kagen "got it right" on many of the issues that Ribble attacked him over, "and that makes him the better pick." The Wisconsin State Journal concurred, urging voters to "proudly re-elect" Congressman Kagen due to his opposition to the "bank bailout and bad trade deals" and his objections "to surging more troops into Afghanistan." The Green Bay Press-Gazette, however, disagreed, endorsing Ribble as a person who "would approach the major challenges facing our country with a set of fresh eyes" and criticizing Congressman Kagen because "there are no significant pieces of legislation or contributions that stand out to convince us he deserves a third term."

==== Predictions ====
| Source | Ranking | As of |
|---|---|---|
| The Cook Political Report | Lean R (flip) | November 1, 2010 |
| Rothenberg | Lean R (flip) | November 1, 2010 |
| Sabato's Crystal Ball | Lean R (flip) | November 1, 2010 |
| RCP | Lean R (flip) | November 1, 2010 |
| CQ Politics | Lean R (flip) | October 28, 2010 |
| New York Times | Lean R (flip) | November 1, 2010 |
| FiveThirtyEight | Likely R (flip) | November 1, 2010 |

==== Results ====
Wisconsin's 8th congressional district election, 2010
| Party | Candidate | Votes | % |
|---|---|---|---|
| Republican | Reid Ribble | 143,998 | 54.77 |
| Democratic | Steve Kagen (incumbent) | 118,646 | 45.12 |
| Write-ins | | 294 | 0.11 |
| Total votes | | 262,938 | 100.00 |
| Republican gain from Democratic | | Swing | -- |
