= Roger Roth =

American politician (born 1978)

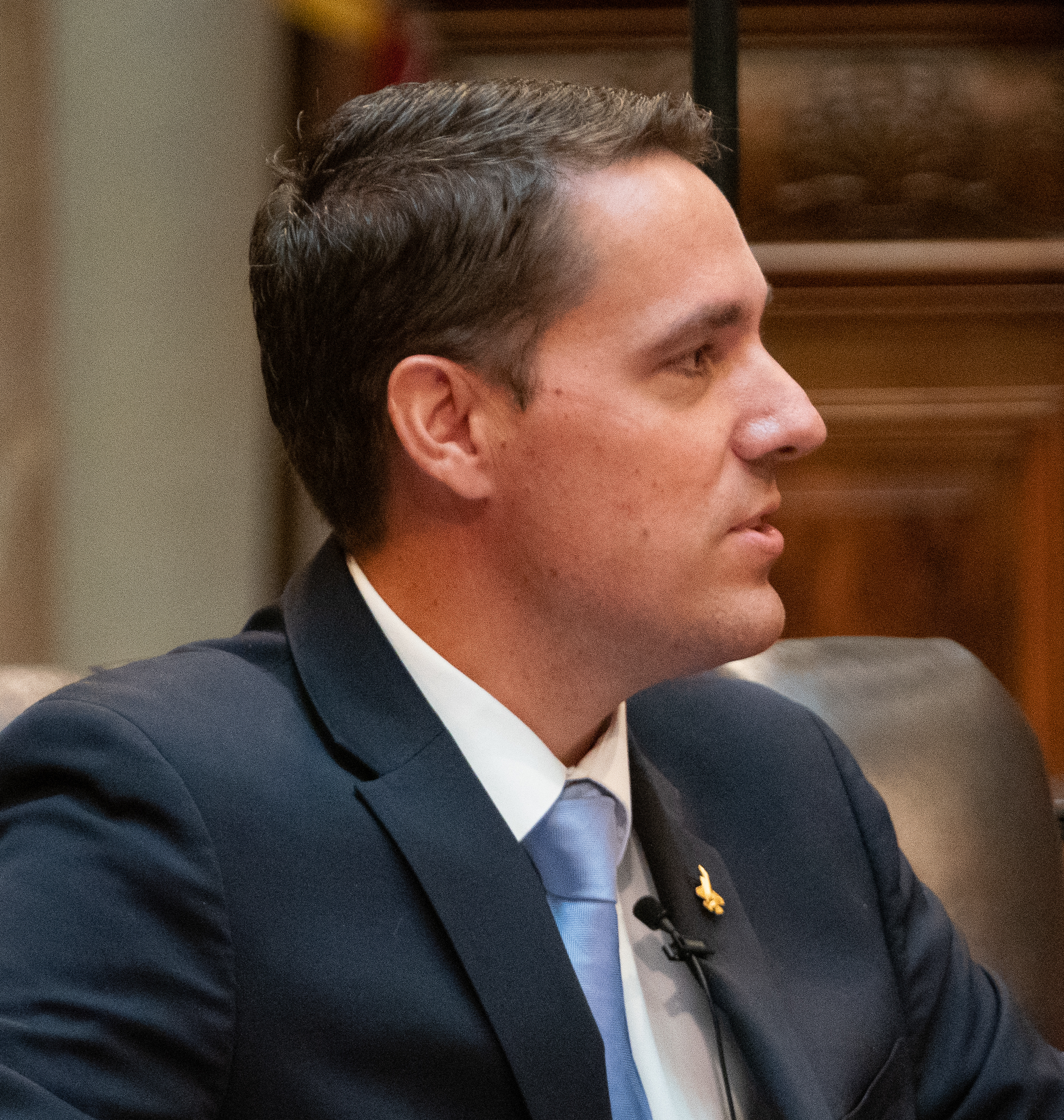

President of the Wisconsin Senate
- In office January 3, 2017 – January 4, 2021
- Preceded by: Mary Lazich
- Succeeded by: Chris Kapenga

Member of the Wisconsin Senate from the 19th district
- In office January 3, 2015 – January 3, 2023
- Preceded by: Michael Ellis
- Succeeded by: Rachael Cabral-Guevara

Member of the Wisconsin State Assembly from the 56th district
- In office January 1, 2007 – January 3, 2011
- Preceded by: Terri McCormick
- Succeeded by: Michelle Litjens

Personal details
- Born: February 5, 1978 (age 48) Appleton, Wisconsin, U.S.
- Party: Republican
- Spouse: Rebecca Roth
- Children: 5
- Relatives: Toby Roth (uncle)
- Education: University of Wisconsin, Oshkosh (BA)

Roger James Roth Jr. (born February 5, 1978) is an American politician from Appleton, Wisconsin. He was a member of the Wisconsin Senate for eight years, representing Wisconsin's 19th Senate district from 2015 to 2023, and was president of the Senate during the 2017–2018 and 2019–2020 legislative terms. Before serving in the Senate, he was a member of the Wisconsin State Assembly, representing Wisconsin's 56th Assembly district for two terms from January 2007 until January 2011.

He was the Republican nominee for Lieutenant Governor of Wisconsin in the 2022 election, and ran unsuccessfully for the Republican nomination for U.S. House of Representatives in Wisconsin's 8th congressional district in 2024. His uncle, Toby Roth, was a member of the U.S. House of Representatives for nine terms.

== Early life, education, and career before politics ==
Roth was born in Appleton, Wisconsin on February 5, 1978. Roth graduated from St. Mary Central High School in Neenah, Wisconsin in 1996 and received his bachelor's degree from the University of Wisconsin–Oshkosh in 2001. He was a member of "Students for Bush" while in college, and also worked on Tommy Thompson's reelection campaign. Prior to entering politics, Roth worked for his family's homebuilding business. In 2003, Roth joined the Wisconsin Air National Guard; he served four tours of duty during the Iraq War, doing F-16 maintenance.

== Political career ==
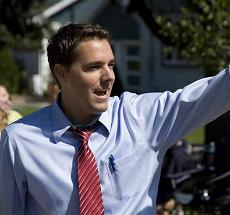
Roth in 2009

Roth was a member of the Wisconsin State Assembly as a Republican from 2007 to 2011. He supported a resolution backing a Republican lawsuit challenging the Affordable Care Act, the federal health care reform legislation signed into law by President Barack Obama. Roth called for the repeal of the ACA.

In 2010, Roth sought the Republican nomination for the U.S. House of Representatives seat from Wisconsin's 8th congressional district, seeking to challenge incumbent Democratic Representative Steve Kagen. However, Roth was defeated by Reid Ribble in the Republican primary election.

In the 2014 election, Roth ran for the Wisconsin State Senate against Penny Bernard Schaber in the 19th state Senate district to replace longtime incumbent Michael Ellis, who retired after holding the seat since 1982. The seat covered Appleton and a large portion of the Fox Valley. Roth won the November 2014 election. Roth was reelected to the state Senate in 2018, defeating Democratic nominee Lee Snodgrass. Roth considered seeking the 2016 Republican nomination to fill the U.S. House seat held by Ribble, who decided not to seek reelection. However, Roth ultimately chose not to run.

In 2017, Roth introduced legislation in the state Senate that would abolish the Wisconsin Department of Natural Resources permitting system for wetland filling, allowing developers to fill state wetlands without oversight. Fellow Republican Jim Steineke introduced a companion bill in the state Assembly. The bill was opposed by environmental and conservation groups. The bill was unsuccessful.

As Senate president, Roth opposed proposals to legalize marijuana in Wisconsin.

In January 2019, Roth falsely claimed that Wisconsin Republicans did not curb the powers of the incoming Democratic administration of Governor Tony Evers and State Attorney General Josh Kaul, during the lame-duck session. In fact, after Evers and Kaul unseated Republicans in the 2018 election, the Republican-majority state legislature passed, and outgoing Republican Governor Scott Walker signed, an array of last-minute bills transferring various powers from the executive to the legislature.

In 2020, Roth proposed a resolution in the Wisconsin Senate, condemning human rights abuses and atrocities by the People's Republic of China and the Chinese Communist Party, including the occupation of Tibet, persecution of Uyghurs, harvesting of organs from Falun Gong practitioners and other political prisoners, and restrictions on religious freedom and freedom of speech; the resolution criticized Chinese propaganda efforts and accused the Chinese government of sustained intellectual property theft.

In January 2021, amid a campaign by President Donald Trump to subvert his defeat by Joe Biden in the 2020 presidential election, Roth opposed a resolution in the Wisconsin Senate to affirm Biden's victory and condemn the U.S. Capitol attack.

As chairman of the Senate Committee on Universities and Technical Colleges, Roth blocked the Evers' nominees to the state technical college system board; years into Evers' governorship, the committee had refused to confirm Evers's nominees while allowing Walker's appointees to continue to serve even though their terms were expired.

In 2021, Roth and fellow Republican Shae Sortwell proposed an amendment to the Wisconsin state Constitution to eliminate elections for the state superintendent, state treasurer, and secretary of state (all positions currently held by Democrats). Roth and Sortwell's proposed amendment would convert these positions into appointed posts filled by the governor with confirmation by the state Senate.

=== Run for lieutenant governor (2022) ===
On February 27, 2022, Roth announced his campaign for Lieutenant Governor of Wisconsin, with a sizeable funding lead compared to his opponents. On August 9, 2022, he won the primary alongside Trump-endorsed gubernatorial candidate and businessman Tim Michels. On November 8, 2022, the pair lost to the Democratic ticket of incumbent Governor Tony Evers and State Representative Sara Rodriguez in the general election.

=== Run for U.S. House (2024) ===
In February 2024, Wisconsin's 8th congressional district incumbent, Mike Gallagher, announced he would not run for re-election. Within hours, Roth announced his campaign to succeed Gallagher in the U.S. House of Representatives. The open seat in the Republican-trending district attracted several prominent Republicans to consider bids, but ultimately only two others entered the race—state senator André Jacque and gas station chain owner Tony Wied. After trying to distance himself from Donald Trump in his 2022 campaign, in 2024, Roth endorsed Trump and sought his endorsement. Trump, however, endorsed the political newcomer, Wied. Trump then went on to attack Roth, saying, "Tony is running against RINO Roger Roth, who is a 'clone' of Paul Ryan, and no friend to MAGA — He should drop out of the Race NOW." Despite Trump's attacks, Roth maintained his support for Trump. Wied prevailed in the primary, receiving 41% of the vote to Roth's 34%.

== Personal life and family ==
Roger Roth Jr. is the second of four sons born to Roger Roth Sr. and his wife Karen (née Schaefer). Roger Roth Sr. is a retired realtor and a younger brother of Toby Roth, who served 18 years in the U.S. House of Representatives, representing Wisconsin's 8th congressional district.

== Electoral history ==
=== Wisconsin Assembly (2006, 2008) ===
Year	Election	Date	Elected				Defeated				Total	Plurality
2006	Primary	Sep. 12	Roger J. Roth Jr.	Republican	3,411	60.41%	Jeanne A. Krueger	Rep.	1,134	20.09%	5,646	2,277
2006	Primary	Sep. 12	Roger J. Roth Jr.	Republican	3,411	60.41%	Bob Wallis	Rep.	1,098	19.45%	5,646	2,277
2006	General	Nov. 7	Roger J. Roth Jr.	Republican	15,472	59.04%	Susan Garcia Franz	Dem.	10,722	40.91%	26,208	4,750
2008	General	Nov. 4	Roger J. Roth Jr. (inc)	Republican	20,971	59.66%	Susan Garcia Franz	Dem.	14,144	40.24%	35,149	6,827

=== U.S. House (2010) ===
Year	Election	Date	Elected				Defeated				Total	Plurality
2010	Primary	Sep. 14	Reid Ribble	Republican	38,521	47.95%	Roger Roth	Rep.	25,704	32.00%	80,336	12,817
2010	Primary	Sep. 14	Reid Ribble	Republican	38,521	47.95%	Terri McCormick	Rep.	14,107	17.56%	80,336	12,817
2010	Primary	Sep. 14	Reid Ribble	Republican	38,521	47.95%	Marc Savard	Rep.	1,968	2.45%	80,336	12,817

=== Wisconsin Senate (2014, 2018) ===
Year	Election	Date	Elected				Defeated				Total	Plurality
2014	General	Nov. 4	Roger J. Roth Jr.	Republican	41,628	57.17%	Penny Bernard Schaber	Dem.	31,135	42.76%	72,815	10,493
2018	General	Nov. 6	Roger J. Roth Jr. (inc)	Republican	43,493	53.23%	Lee Snodgrass	Dem.	38,179	46.73%	81,701	5,314

=== Wisconsin Lieutenant Governor (2022) ===
Year	Election	Date	Elected				Defeated				Total	Plurality
2022	Primary	Aug. 14	Roger Roth	Republican	178,972	30.08%	Patrick Testin	Rep.	109,374	18.38%	595,001	69,598
2022	Primary	Aug. 14	Roger Roth	Republican	178,972	30.08%	Cindy Werner	Rep.	80,953	13.61%	595,001	69,598
2022	Primary	Aug. 14	Roger Roth	Republican	178,972	30.08%	Jonathan Wichmann	Rep.	79,166	13.31%	595,001	69,598
2022	Primary	Aug. 14	Roger Roth	Republican	178,972	30.08%	Will Martin	Rep.	54,790	9.21%	595,001	69,598
2022	Primary	Aug. 14	Roger Roth	Republican	178,972	30.08%	Kyle Yudes	Rep.	32,051	5.39%	595,001	69,598
2022	Primary	Aug. 14	Roger Roth	Republican	178,972	30.08%	David C. Varnam	Rep.	30,640	5.15%	595,001	69,598
2022	Primary	Aug. 14	Roger Roth	Republican	178,972	30.08%	David D. King	Rep.	27,443	4.61%	595,001	69,598
2022	General	Nov. 8	Tony Evers (inc); Sara Rodriguez	Democratic	1,358,774	51.15%	Tim Michels; Roger Roth	Rep.	1,268,535	47.75%	2,656,490	90,239
2022	General	Nov. 8	Tony Evers (inc); Sara Rodriguez	Democratic	1,358,774	51.15%	Joan Ellis Beglinger (withdrawn); N/A	Ind.	27,198	1.02%	2,656,490	90,239
2022	General	Nov. 8	Tony Evers (inc); Sara Rodriguez	Democratic	1,358,774	51.15%	Seth Haskin (write-in); N/A	Ind.	104	0.00%	2,656,490	90,239

=== U.S. House (2024) ===
Year	Election	Date	Elected				Defeated				Total	Plurality
2024 (special)	Primary	Aug. 13	Tony Wied	Republican	42,610	42.48%	Roger Roth	Rep.	31,874	32.53%	97,993	10,736
2024 (special)	Primary	Aug. 13	Tony Wied	Republican	42,610	42.48%	André Jacque	Rep.	23,509	23.99%	97,993	10,736
2024	Primary	Aug. 13	Tony Wied (inc)	Republican	41,937	42.13%	Roger Roth	Rep.	34,344	34.51%	99,532	7,593
2024	Primary	Aug. 13	Tony Wied (inc)	Republican	41,937	42.13%	André Jacque	Rep.	23,186	23.30%	99,532	7,593

Party political offices
Preceded by Rebecca Kleefisch	Republican nominee for Lieutenant Governor of Wisconsin; 2022	Most recent
Wisconsin State Assembly
Preceded by Terri McCormick	Member of the Wisconsin State Assembly from the 56th district January 1, 2007 – January 3, 2011	Succeeded by Michelle Litjens
Wisconsin Senate
Preceded by Michael Ellis	Member of the Wisconsin Senate from the 19th district January 3, 2015 – January 3, 2023	Succeeded by Rachael Cabral-Guevara
Preceded by Mary Lazich	President of the Wisconsin Senate; 2017–2021	Succeeded by Chris Kapenga
