= NRCA =

NRCA may refer to:

- North Raleigh Christian Academy, a Christian school in Raleigh, North Carolina, United States
- National Roofing Contractors Association, national association of professional roofing contractors
