= Amanda Stuck =

American politician (born 1982)

Member of the Wisconsin State Assembly from the 57th district
- In office January 3, 2015 – January 4, 2021
- Preceded by: Penny Bernard Schaber
- Succeeded by: Lee Snodgrass

Personal details
- Born: December 16, 1982 (age 43) Appleton, Wisconsin, U.S.
- Party: Democratic
- Education: University of Wisconsin, Oshkosh (BA, MPA)
- Website: Government website Campaign website

Amanda Mariah Stuck (born December 16, 1982) is an American politician. A Democrat, she was a member of the Wisconsin State Assembly from 2015 to 2021, and was an unsuccessful candidate for United States House of Representatives in 2020.

== Early life and education ==
Stuck was born on December 16, 1982, in Appleton, Wisconsin, and attended Appleton North High School. She received her Bachelor of Arts degree in Political Science and Master of Public Administration from the University of Wisconsin–Oshkosh.

== Career ==
Stuck was a rural mail carrier and worked at the Appleton Housing Authority. She was also an aide to former Congressman Steve Kagen.

On November 4, 2014, Stuck was elected to the Wisconsin State Assembly as a Democrat, succeeding Penny Bernard Schaber. In 2016 and 2018 Stuck ran unopposed for re-election.

In July 2019, Stuck announced her intentions to run for Wisconsin's 8th congressional district against Mike Gallagher in the 2020 election. Stuck won the Democratic primary, but lost to Gallagher in the November general election.

Wisconsin State Assembly
| Preceded by Penny Bernard Schaber | Member of the Wisconsin State Assembly from the 57th district 2015–2021 | Succeeded by Lee Snodgrass |
