= Lee Snodgrass =

21st century American politician

Member of the Wisconsin State Assembly
- Incumbent
- Assumed office January 6, 2025
- Preceded by: Jerry L. O'Connor
- Constituency: 52nd district
- In office January 4, 2021 – January 6, 2025
- Preceded by: Amanda Stuck
- Succeeded by: Kevin David Petersen
- Constituency: 57th district

2nd Vice Chair of the Democratic Party of Wisconsin
- In office July 1, 2019 – July 1, 2023
- Preceded by: Mandela Barnes
- Succeeded by: Tricia Zunker

Personal details
- Born: Lee Alyson Snodgrass; February 9, 1969 (age 57) Philadelphia, Pennsylvania, U.S.
- Party: Democratic
- Spouse: John H. Ptacek (m. 1993, divorced)
- Children: 2
- Education: University of Wisconsin–Madison (B.A.)
- Profession: politician
- Website: Campaign website; Campaign twitter

Lee Alyson Snodgrass (born February 9, 1969) is an American communications consultant, campaign organizer, and Democratic politician from Appleton, Wisconsin. She is a member of the Wisconsin State Assembly, representing Wisconsin's 52nd Assembly district since 2025; she previously represented the 57th Assembly district from 2021 to 2025. She also previously served as 2nd vice chair of the Democratic Party of Wisconsin and chair of the Democratic Party of Outagamie County, Wisconsin.

== Early life and career ==
Snodgrass was born in Philadelphia, the daughter of a paper mill engineer and a registered nurse. Her father's work with James River Paper brought her family to Green Bay, Wisconsin, where she graduated from Preble High School in 1987. She went on to study at the University of Wisconsin–Madison, and earned her bachelor's degree in English in 1991.

Following her college graduation, she moved to Maryland. While living there, she became engaged to John Ptacek, another University of Wisconsin graduate. In 1995, they returned to Wisconsin to reside at Appleton, where Snodgrass was employed at the Fox River Paper Company as a marketing and communications assistant.

She worked as a project manager for the Allen James Design communications agency from 2006 until 2012, and then moved into her current job, as director of communications & customer care for the Girl Scouts of the Northwestern Great Lakes.

== Political career ==
Snodgrass got involved in politics long before running for office and continued through her career. As a college student, in 1992, she volunteered on Tammy Baldwin's first campaign for Wisconsin State Assembly and Russ Feingold's first campaign for United States Senate. She worked as a volunteer on the presidential campaigns of John Kerry, Barack Obama, and Hillary Clinton, and worked on the Wisconsin State Assembly campaigns of Appleton assemblymembers Penny Bernard Schaber and Amanda Stuck.

=== 2018 Senate campaign ===
After the 2016 campaign, Snodgrass was elected chair of the Democratic Party of Outagamie County, Wisconsin. A little over a year later she made her first attempt at elected office. In April 2018, she announced she would challenge incumbent Wisconsin Senate president Roger Roth in the 19th Senate district. The 19th Senate district at that time comprised the cities of Neenah and Menasha and most of Appleton, as well as the northern half of Winnebago County and several towns in southern Outagamie County. The Democratic Legislative Campaign Committee targeted her race for funding from the national party organization.

Another Appleton Democrat, Outagamie County Supervisor Dan Grady, also challenged Roth in 2018, setting up a primary. Snodgrass was endorsed before the primary by EMILY's List and built a 10-to-1 cash advantage over Grady. Snodgrass prevailed in the August primary with 64% of the vote, and she went on to face Roth in the November general election.

The general election race touched on a number of state topics of the era. Snodgrass criticized the Republican legislature and Scott Walker administration for the management of the Foxconn in Wisconsin project, which was expected to build a massive production facility and logistics depot in the district of Republican Assembly speaker Robin Vos. She questioned the $3,000,000,000 in tax credits promised to the company, which, she said, had a "history of broken contracts and human rights violations," and pointed out that the company, Foxconn, had already downgraded its commitment to job creation that would come with the project. She criticized the Republican legislature for raiding state highway funds to build the desired infrastructure around the Foxconn project, and noted that these policies would lead to rising costs and degraded infrastructure for the rest of the state. She also pointed to the environmental impacts of the Foxconn project, and the violation of the Great Lakes Compact between the great lakes states.

Snodgrass also called for a repeal of the highly controversial 2011 Wisconsin Act 10 law, which had removed collective bargaining rights from public sector unions and, she claimed, led to a teacher shortage in the state.

Snodgrass also frequently stated that the number one issue for voters she spoke to was health care, with concerns about losing coverage for pre-existing conditions, unaffordable prescription drugs, and expensive insurance plans. She pledged that, if elected, she would push the state to accept federal funds for Medicaid expansion as provided for under the Affordable Care Act. On other issues, Snodgrass supported increased state funding for public education, infrastructure projects, and financial aid for students of the University of Wisconsin and Wisconsin Technical Colleges. Snodgrass also endorsed immediate legalization of medical marijuana with a plan to put full legalization of cannabis to a public referendum.

She also criticized Roth over a bill he had authored and then pulled from consideration during the previous legislative session. The bill would have closed a Wisconsin property tax loophole that allowed businesses to significantly decrease their tax assessments. Snodgrass alleged that he pulled the bill as a bow to lobbying from Wisconsin Manufacturers & Commerce, a major conservative political action committee in the state. She pledged to close the loophole if elected.

Snodgrass fell 5,000 votes short in the general election, taking roughly 47% of the vote. Despite the electoral defeat, she won support from within the Democratic Party and, a few months later, joined Ben Wikler's slate of candidates seeking to take leadership of the Democratic Party of Wisconsin. At the state party convention in June, Wikler's slate won the approval of the party, and Snodgrass became 2nd vice chair of the party for a two-year term. Following their election, Snodgrass pledged, "We are going to organize across this state 24/7, 365."

=== 2020 Assembly campaign ===
Also in 2019, Snodgrass was approached by incumbent Appleton state representative Amanda Stuck to discuss her plans for 2020. Stuck intended to leave her Assembly seat to run for United States House of Representatives against incumbent Republican Mike Gallagher, and courted Snodgrass as her successor in the Assembly. Stuck later said she wanted to be sure that her Assembly seat fell to someone, "who's going to still be here for [her constituents] fighting at the state level." In July 2019, Stuck announced her campaign for United States Congress, and Snodgrass, only a month after being elected to the state party leadership team, announced she would run for Wisconsin State Assembly in the 57th assembly district. Snodgrass did not face an opponent in the Democratic primary and went on to face Appleton business owner Eric J. Beach in the general election. Snodgrass prevailed in November with 56% of the vote.

== Personal life and family ==
Snodgrass was married in October 1993 to John H. Ptacek of Fontana, Wisconsin, whom she met at the University of Wisconsin–Madison. They had two children together—one daughter and one son—before separating. Snodgrass now resides in Appleton, Wisconsin. Her young adult children are currently attending college in Minnesota and Wisconsin.

== Electoral history ==
=== Wisconsin Senate (2018) ===
| Year | Election | Date | Elected | | | | Defeated | | | | Total | Plurality |
|---|---|---|---|---|---|---|---|---|---|---|---|---|
| 2018 | Primary | Aug. 14 | Lee Snodgrass | Democratic | 8,157 | 64.00% | Dan Grady | Dem. | 4,585 | 35.97% | 12,746 | 3,572 |
| 2018 | General | Nov. 6 | Roger Roth (inc) | Republican | 43,493 | 53.23% | Lee Snodgrass | Dem. | 38,179 | 46.73% | 81,701 | 5,314 |

=== Wisconsin Assembly, 57th district (2020, 2022) ===
| Year | Election | Date | Elected | | | | Defeated | | | | Total | Plurality |
|---|---|---|---|---|---|---|---|---|---|---|---|---|
| 2020 | General | Nov. 3 | Lee Snodgrass | Democratic | 15,972 | 56.52% | Eric J. Beach | Rep. | 12,277 | 43.44% | 28,260 | 3,695 |
| 2022 | General | Nov. 8 | Lee Snodgrass (inc) | Democratic | 13,577 | 59.36% | Andrew Fox | Rep. | 9,282 | 40.58% | 22,871 | 4,295 |

=== Wisconsin Assembly, 52nd district (2024) ===
| Year | Election | Date | Elected | | | | Defeated | | | | Total | Plurality |
|---|---|---|---|---|---|---|---|---|---|---|---|---|
| 2024 | General | Nov. 5 | Lee Snodgrass | Democratic | 17,681 | 57.25% | Chad Cooke | Rep. | 13,203 | 42.75% | 38,046 | 4,478 |

Party political offices
| Preceded by Mandela Barnes | 2nd Vice Chair of the Democratic Party of Wisconsin; June 2019 – June 2023 | Succeeded by Tricia Zunker |
Wisconsin State Assembly
| Preceded by Amanda Stuck | Member of the Wisconsin State Assembly from the 57th district January 4, 2021 – January 6, 2025 | Succeeded by Kevin David Petersen |
| Preceded by Jerry L. O'Connor | Member of the Wisconsin State Assembly from the 52nd district January 6, 2025 – present | Incumbent |
