= Jasper Contractors =

Jasper Contractors, Inc.
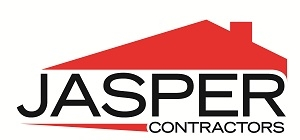
- Industry: Construction
- Founded: 2004
- Founders: Brian Wedding
- Headquarters: Kennesaw, Georgia, U.S.
- Services: Roofing, HVAC
- Website: http://www.jaspercontractorsinc.com

Jasper Contractors, Inc. (est. 2004) is a national roofing contractor company headquartered in Kennesaw, Georgia in the United States.

== History ==
Jasper Contractors was founded in 2004 by Brian Wedding in Evansville, Indiana. The contracting company worked on new residential constructions.

After Hurricane Ivan in 2005, Wedding received business in Florida repairing damaged property. Hurricanes Dennis and Katrina brought increased business to Jasper Contractors. The company set up headquarters in Baton Rouge after Hurricane Katrina. The company received media attention for its work with storm elements, such as damage from hail, ice, rain, and wind, and switched from a new construction contractor to a storm damage contractor.

Jasper Contractors doubled its number of employees from 2010 to 2011.

In 2011, Jasper was ranked 29th in Roofing Contractor Magazine's Top 100 Roofing Contractors. Jasper is a member of the National Roofing Contractors Association and the National Association of Home Builders.

Company revenue in 2011 was over $50 million, up from $19 million in 2010. The company employs about 200 people.

In April 2016, the Occupational Safety and Health Administration fined the company for health and safety violations. Since 2009, the company has had to pay more than $516,000 in fines following OSHA citations.

== Partners ==
Jasper Contractors partners with Owens Corning and Trane.
