= Michelle Litjens =

American politician and businesswoman

Member of the Wisconsin State Assembly from the 56th district
- In office January 3, 2011 – January 7, 2013
- Preceded by: Roger Roth
- Succeeded by: Dave Murphy

Personal details
- Born: September 28, 1972 (age 54) St. Louis, Missouri, U.S.
- Party: Republican
- Spouse: Robin Vos (m. 2017)
- Education: UW-Oshkosh
- Profession: Politician, real estate builder and manager

Michelle Litjens (born September 28, 1972) is an American politician and businesswoman.

== Background ==
Born in St. Louis, Missouri, she graduated from St. Mary Central High School and then from UW-Oshkosh with a degree in political science in 1995. She was a real estate builder and manager. Litjens lives in Neenah, Wisconsin.

== Political career ==
Litjens was elected to the Wisconsin State Assembly in 2010. She served one term and did not seek re-election in 2012.
