= Wisconsin's 56th Assembly district =

American legislative district in east-central Wisconsin

Wisconsin's 56th State Assembly district
- 2024 map defined in 2023 Wisc. Act 94; 2022 map defined in Johnson v. Wisconsin Elections Commission; 2011 map was defined in 2011 Wisc. Act 43
Assemblymember
David Murphy; R–Greenville
since January 7, 2013 (13 years)
- Demographics: 91.73% White; 0.79% Black; 3.39% Hispanic; 2.09% Asian; 1.53% Native American; 0.04% Hawaiian/Pacific Islander
- Population (2020) • Voting age: 59,877; 45,505
- Website: Official website
- Notes: East-central Wisconsin

The 56th Assembly district of the Wisconsin is one of 99 districts in the Wisconsin State Assembly. Located in east-central Wisconsin, the district comprises much of central and western Outagamie County and part of eastern Waupaca County. It includes the city of New London and the villages of Bear Creek, Black Creek, Hortonville, and Shiocton, and part of the north side of the city of Appleton. The district is represented by Republican Dave Murphy, since January 2013.

The 56th Assembly district is located within Wisconsin's 19th Senate district, along with the 55th and 57th Assembly districts.

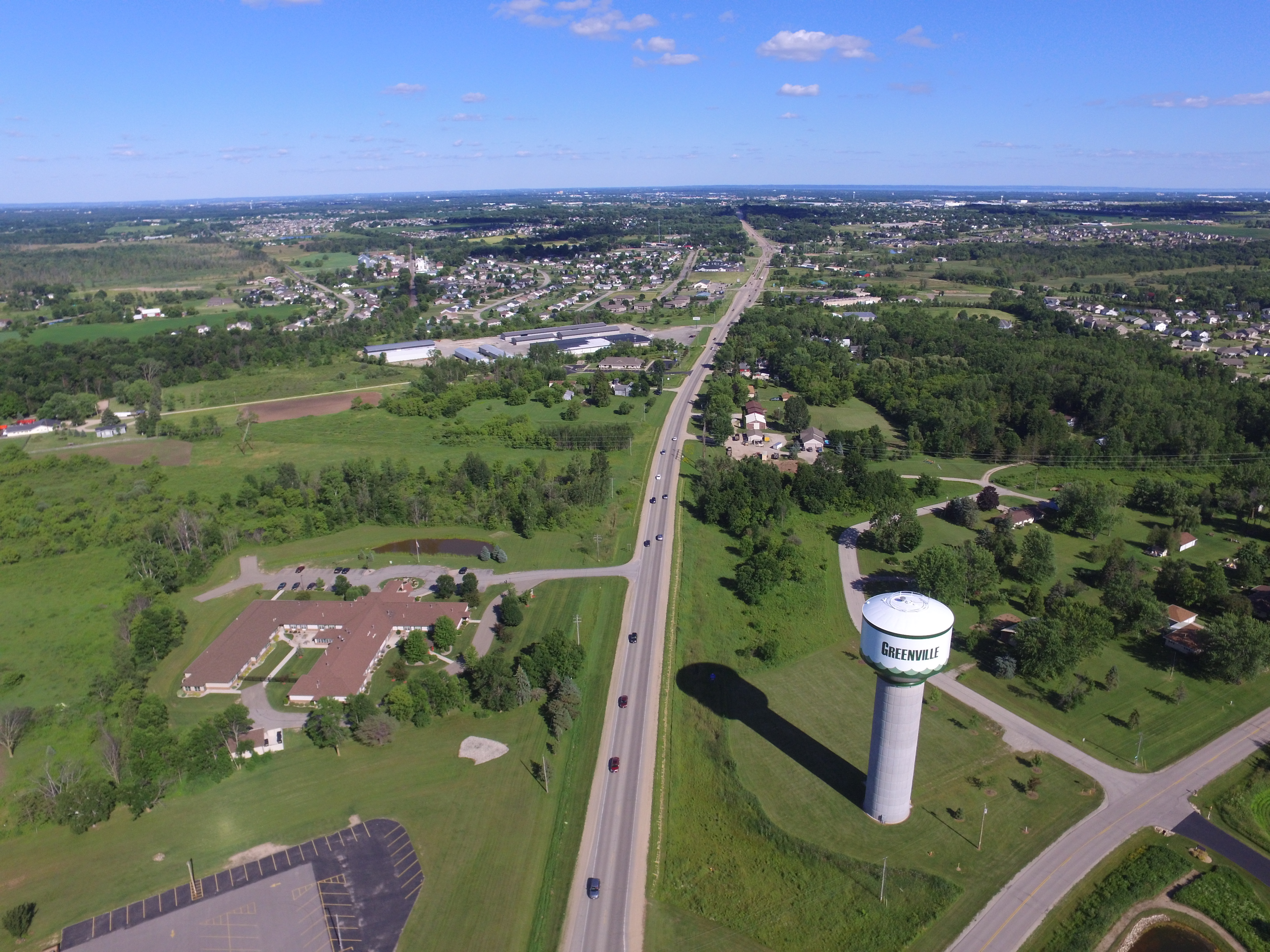
Aerial view of the town of Greenville

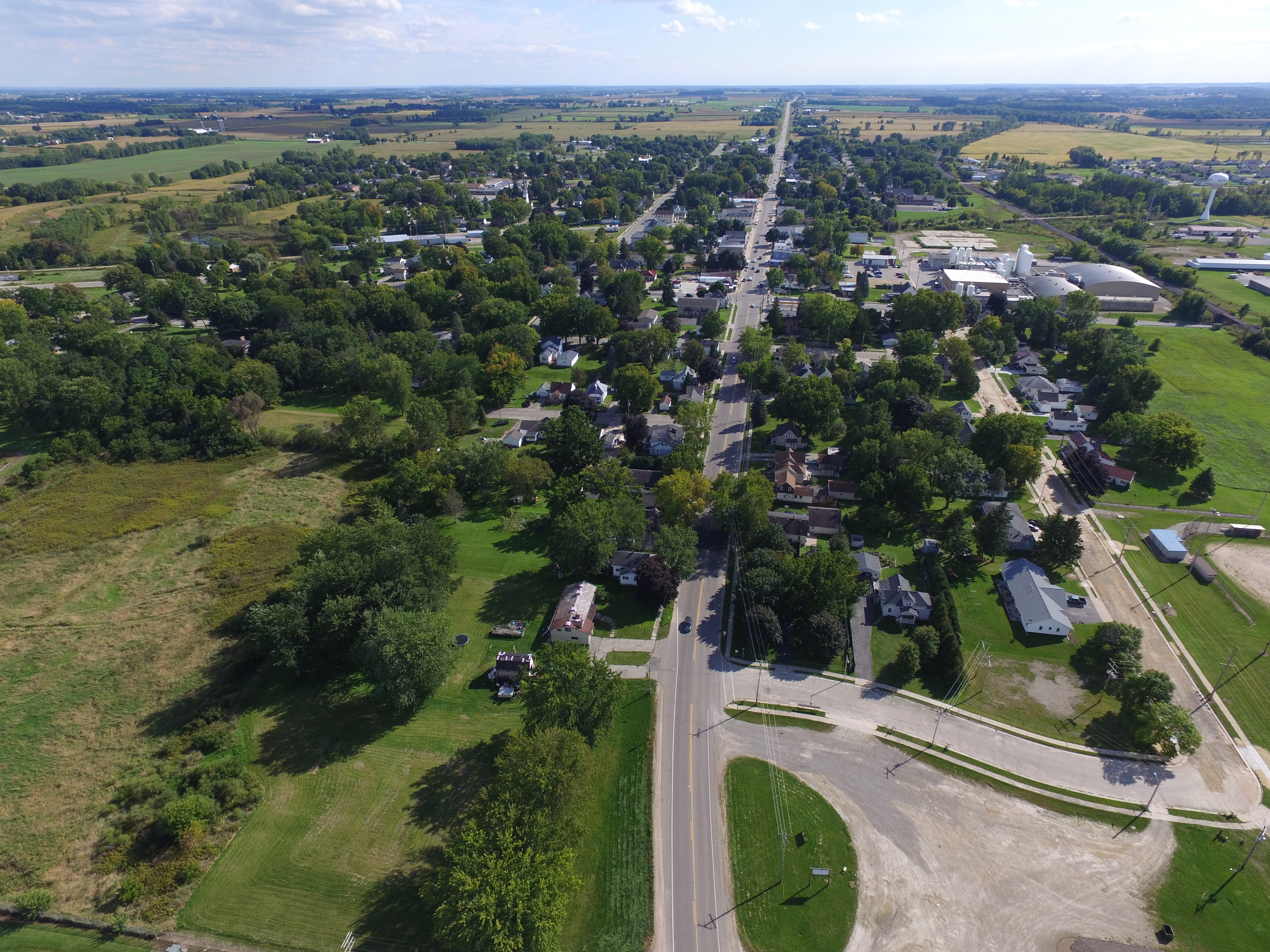
Black Creek

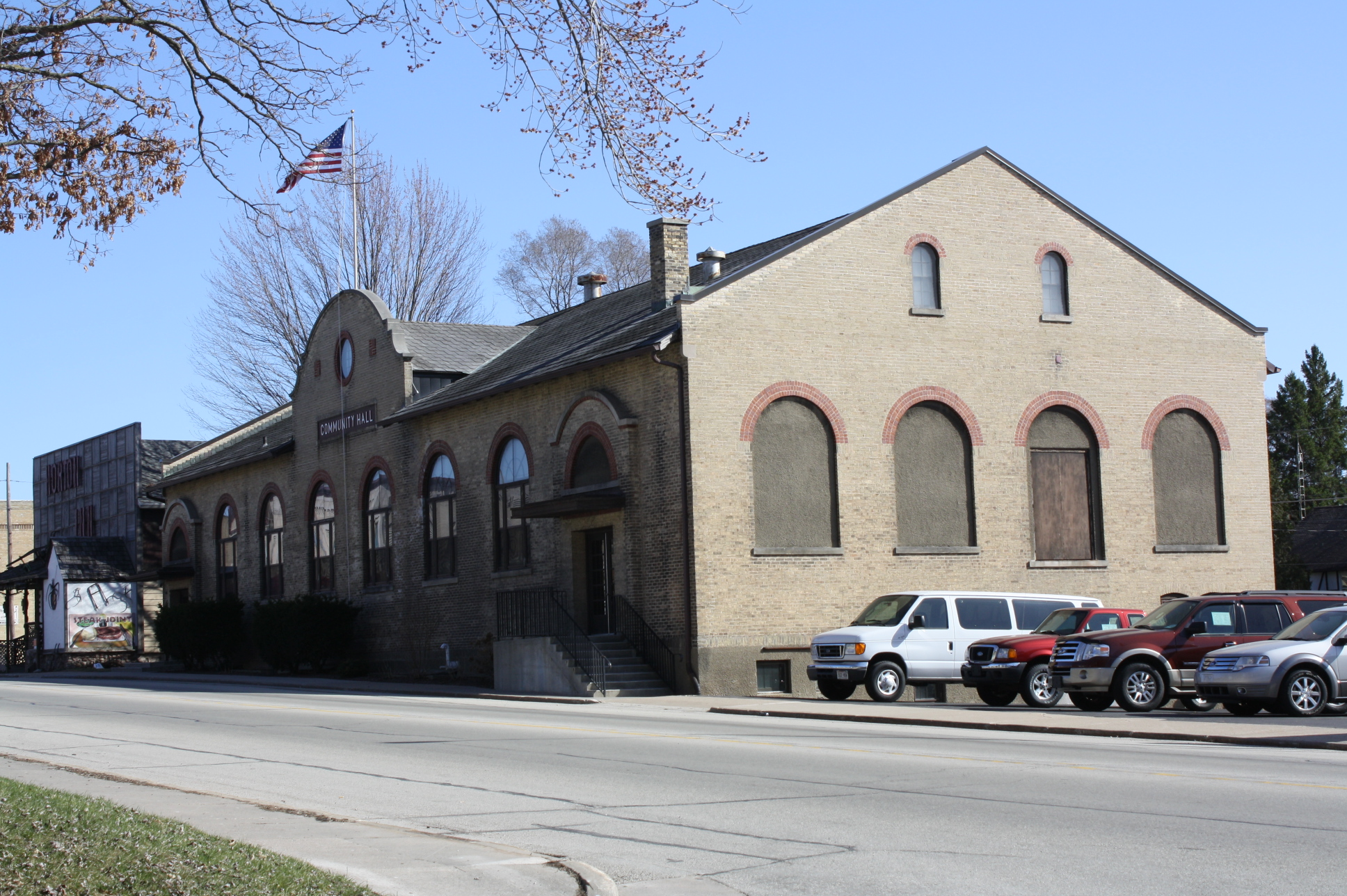
Hortonville Community Hall

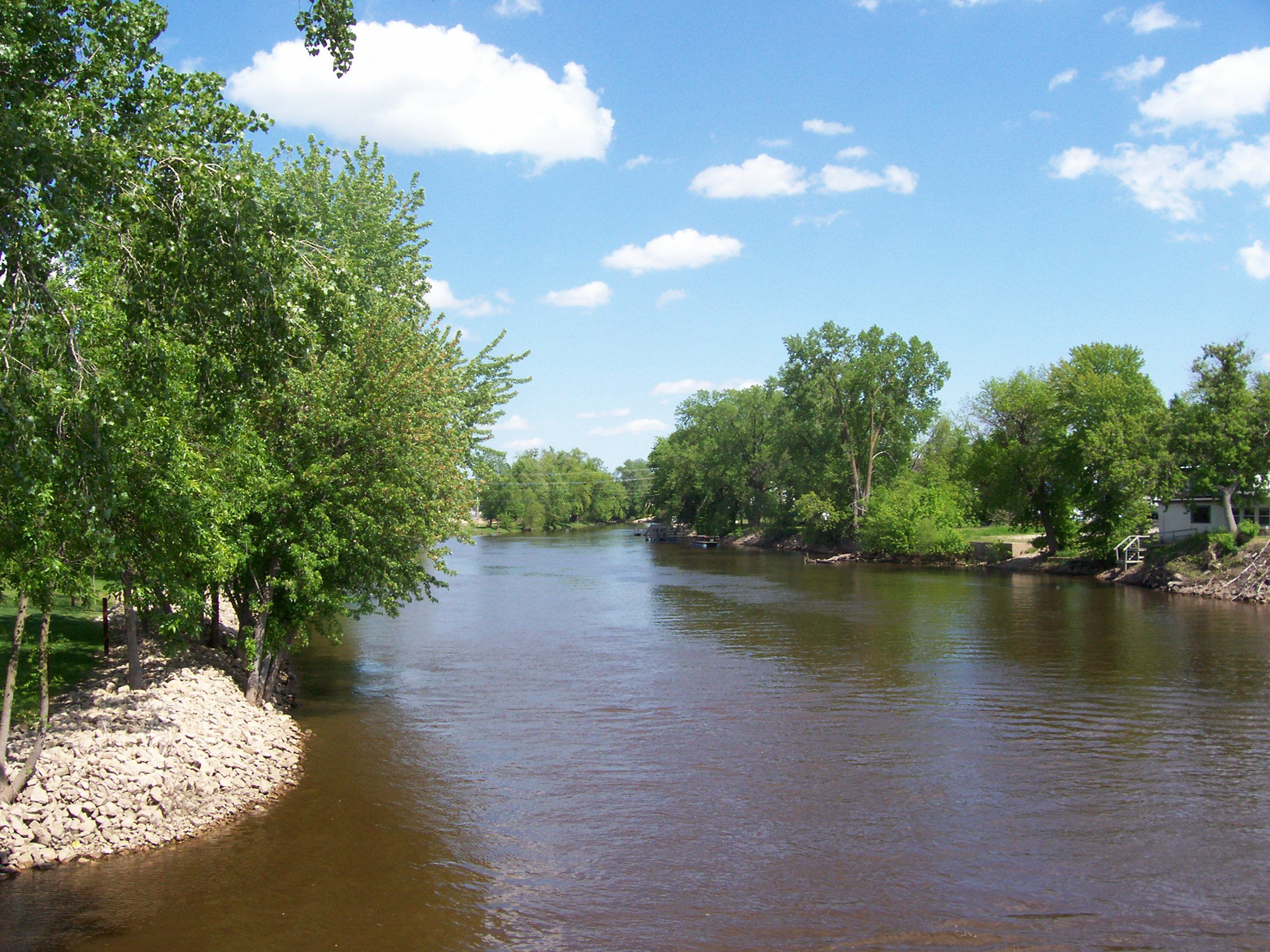
Wolf River in New London

== List of past representatives ==
List of representatives to the Wisconsin State Assembly from the 56th district
Member	Party	Residence	Counties represented	Term start	Term end	Ref.
District created
Richard A. Flintrop	Dem.	Oshkosh	Winnebago	January 1, 1973	January 3, 1983	
Joseph Looby	Dem.	Eau Claire	Chippewa, Eau Claire	January 3, 1983	January 7, 1985	
Gordon R. Bradley	Rep.	Oshkosh	Fond du Lac, Outagamie, Winnebago	January 7, 1985	January 2, 1989	
Judith Klusman	Rep.	Clayton	Outagamie, Winnebago	January 2, 1989	January 1, 2001	
Terri McCormick	Rep.	Appleton	Outagamie, Winnebago	January 1, 2001	January 1, 2007	
Roger Roth	Rep.	Appleton	Outagamie, Winnebago	January 1, 2007	January 3, 2011	
Michelle Litjens	Rep.	Vinland	Outagamie, Winnebago	January 3, 2011	January 7, 2013	
David Murphy	Rep.	Greenville	Outagamie, Winnebago	January 7, 2013	Current	
Anthony Phillips	Rep.		Outagamie, Winnebago	January 4, 2027	Member-elect	
