= Reid Ribble =

American politician (born 1956)

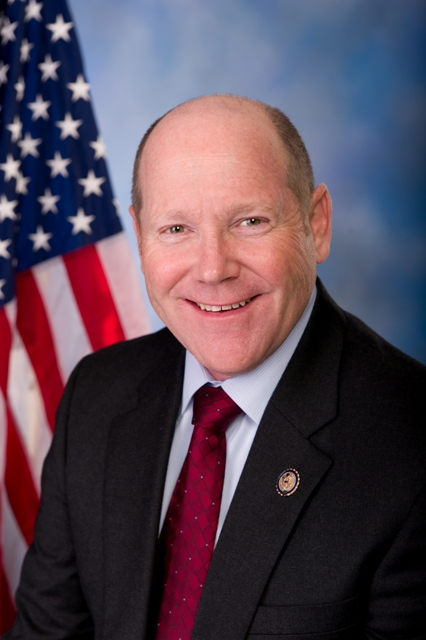

Member of the U.S. House of Representatives from Wisconsin's 8th district
- In office January 3, 2011 – January 3, 2017
- Preceded by: Steve Kagen
- Succeeded by: Mike Gallagher

Personal details
- Born: Reid James Ribble; April 5, 1956 (age 70) Neenah, Wisconsin, U.S.
- Party: Republican
- Spouse: Deana Ribble
- Children: 2
- Education: Cornerstone University

Reid James Ribble (born April 5, 1956) is an American businessman and Republican politician from the Fox Cities region of Wisconsin. He served three terms in the United States House of Representatives, representing Wisconsin's 8th congressional district from 2011 to 2017.

In Congress, Ribble was a co-chair and co-founder of the bipartisan Problem Solvers Caucus, which sought to foster cooperation and legislative compromise. He has been an outspoken critic of Republican president Donald Trump; he has said that he never voted for Trump, and would have voted to impeach him after the January 6 attack on the United States Capitol.

== Early life and education ==
Ribble is a third generation Wisconsin resident. He was born in Neenah, Wisconsin. He graduated from Appleton East High School. After high school, he attended Cornerstone University.

== Early career ==
Ribble was employed by the Ribble Group, his family's commercial and residential roofing company in Kaukauna, Wisconsin, and later became the company's president. He was also the president of the National Roofing Contractors Association (NRCA), a trade association for the roofing contractors industry in the United States, from 2005 to 2006.

== U.S. House of Representatives ==
=== Elections ===
==== 2010 ====
Ribble defeated three other candidates to win the Republican primary in September. Ribble defeated Democratic incumbent Steve Kagen for Wisconsin's 8th congressional district on November 2, 2010 in the general election.

==== 2012 ====
Ribble defeated Democratic nominee Jamie Wall, a business consultant.

==== 2014 ====
Ribble defeated Democratic nominee Ron Gruett, a professor of physics and chemistry.

=== Tenure ===
Ribble has been described as a Libertarian leaning Republican.

Energy

Ribble believed we should utilize the "wide variety of available domestic sources to put our country on a path to energy independence." Reid Ribble voted YES on barring EPA from regulating greenhouse gases. To become self-sufficient, Ribble wanted to expand the usage of both renewable and fossil fuels, so that the U.S. will not rely too much on any single source or foreign region. In June 2012, he voted for the Domestic Energy and Jobs Act, which would increase oil and gas drilling in the U.S., and decrease environmental restrictions. In addition, Ribble also supported the Offshore Leasing Act in May 2011, and required "the Secretary of the Interior to conduct offshore oil and gas lease sales."

Agriculture

Coming from a state with a great economic emphasis on agriculture, Ribble advocated for continued success in the farming sector of Wisconsin. He favored less government regulation on farming, and wanted to reform several Environmental Protection Agency restrictions, believing that "Wisconsin's dairy farmers, livestock producers, and growers all will benefit from efforts to roll back EPA's overreach." He was a vocal member of the House Agriculture Committee, and has received a rating of 94% from the American Farm Bureau Federation as of 2011.

Budget

Ribble voted (March 2015) to support the Republican Study Committee budget. This was the most conservative of the various budget proposals considered by the House and was defeated by 294 to 132. Ribble went on to support the mainstream Republican budget proposed by Republican leadership, which was passed by the House.

Health Care

Ribble strongly disagreed with the 2010 Affordable Care Act, or Obamacare. In July 2012, he voted for the Repeals the Patient Protection and Affordable Care Act of 2010, stating that "instead of fixing the systematic flaws in our country's healthcare system it makes it even more costly and dysfunctional." He believed instead, that government should not be involved in the market and encourage greater competition between insurance companies.

Social Security

In a letter to House Speaker John Boehner dated October 8, 2013, Ribble proposed sweeping changes to Social Security, including continuing and accelerating increases in the retirement age, implementing the chained CPI benefit cut to Social Security, and means testing for Social Security recipients. Ribble's letter also proposed "gradually restoring the cap on wages subject to FICA to its Reagan-era levels."

==== Transportation ====
In June 2015, Ribble introduced the Bridge to Sustainable Infrastructure Act. Jim Renacci co-sponsored the bill with Ribble. If signed into law, the bill would provide long-term funding to the Highway Trust Fund and federal programs to rebuild roads, highways and bridges. After introducing the bill, Ribble wrote in an opinion editorial on CNBC.com, " Our transportation infrastructure is ubiquitous, but it is not free."

=== Legislation ===
On September 20, 2013, the House passed a bipartisan measure championed by Ribble. The measure, titled the Restoring Healthy Forests for Healthy Communities Act, aims to manage commercial timberland and the yields each field can produce. Backers of the bill say that the bill would foster job growth in rural communities where the paper industry is prevalent, such as the Chequamegon-Nicolet National Forest in Wisconsin.

=== Committee assignments ===
- Committee on Agriculture (2011-2014)
  - Subcommittee on Conservation, Energy, and Forestry
  - Subcommittee on Livestock, Rural Development, and Credit
- Committee on the Budget (2011-2014)
- Committee on Foreign Affairs (2015-2016)
  - Subcommittee on Europe, Eurasia, and Emerging Threats (Vice Chair, 2015–16)
  - Subcommittee on Terrorism, Nonproliferation, and Trade
- Committee on Transportation and Infrastructure (2011-2016)
  - Subcommittee on Aviation
  - Subcommittee on Highways and Transit (Vice Chair, 2013–14)
  - Subcommittee on Water Resources and Environment

=== Caucus memberships ===
- Liberty Caucus
- Problem Solvers Caucus, co-chair and founder
- Dairy Caucus, co-chair
- Paper Caucus, co-chair and founder
- Cranberry Caucus, co-chair and founder
- Fix Congress Now! Caucus, co-chair and founder

== Retirement ==
On January 30, 2016, Ribble announced that he would not seek re-election for a fourth term to Congress, retiring based on a pledge that he would retire after his fourth term or eighth year in Congress, and expressed a desire to return to the private sector.

In February 2021, Ribble commented on the need for the Republican Party to move past Donald Trump, stating that he would have voted to impeach Donald Trump for his role in the 2021 United States Capitol attack.

In October 2022, Ribble joined the Council for Responsible Social Media project launched by Issue One to address the negative mental, civic, and public health impacts of social media in the United States co-chaired by former House Democratic Caucus Leader Dick Gephardt and former Massachusetts Lieutenant Governor Kerry Healey.

== Electoral history ==
=== U.S. House (2010–2014) ===
Year	Election	Date	Elected				Defeated				Total	Plurality
2010	Primary	Sep. 14	Reid J. Ribble	Republican	38,521	47.95%	Roger Roth	Rep.	25,704	32.00%	80,336	12,817
2010	Primary	Sep. 14	Reid J. Ribble	Republican	38,521	47.95%	Terri McCormick	Rep.	14,107	17.56%	80,336	12,817
2010	Primary	Sep. 14	Reid J. Ribble	Republican	38,521	47.95%	Marc Savard	Rep.	1,968	2.45%	80,336	12,817
2010	General	Nov. 2	Reid J. Ribble	Republican	143,998	54.77%	Steve Kagen (inc)	Dem.	118,646	45.12%	262,938	25,352
2012	General	Nov. 6	Reid J. Ribble (inc)	Republican	198,874	55.95%	Jamie Wall	Dem.	156,287	43.97%	355,464	42,587
2014	General	Nov. 4	Reid J. Ribble (inc)	Republican	188,553	65.01%	Ron Gruett	Dem.	101,345	34.94%	290,048	87,208

U.S. House of Representatives
Preceded by Lester L. Wolff	Member of the U.S. House of Representatives from Wisconsin's 8th congressional district 2011–2017	Succeeded by Mike Gallagher
Party political offices
New office	Republican Co-Chair of the Problem Solvers Caucus; 2013–2015; Served alongside: Kurt Schrader	Succeeded by Tom Reed
U.S. order of precedence (ceremonial)
Preceded by David R. Nagle as Former U.S. Representative	Order of precedence of the United States as Former U.S. Representative	Succeeded by Mike Gallagher as Former U.S. Representative
