= Penny Bernard Schaber =

American politician

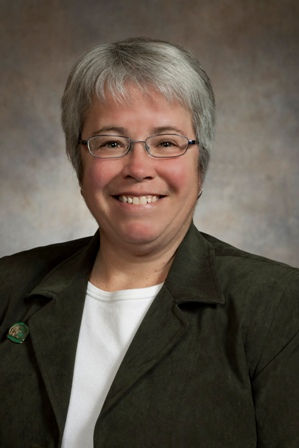

Member of the Wisconsin State Assembly from the 57th district
- In office January 3, 2009 – January 3, 2015
- Preceded by: Steve Wieckert
- Succeeded by: Amanda Stuck

Personal details
- Born: November 5, 1953 (age 72) Mundelein, Illinois, U.S.
- Party: Democratic
- Education: Southern Illinois University (BS); Northwestern University Medical School (MPT)
- Occupation: Physical therapist

Penny Bernard Schaber is an American politician who served as a member of the Wisconsin State Assembly, representing the 57th Assembly District from 2009 to 2015.

== Early life and education ==
Schaber was raised in Mundelein, Illinois and remained in Illinois to complete her Associate and Bachelor of Science degrees from Southern Illinois University. After graduation, she volunteered for the Peace Corps, working at a hospital in Campo Grande, Brazil. When she returned to the United States, she attended Northwestern University in Evanston, Illinois where she received a degree in physical therapy.

== Career ==
Bernard Schaber's career in healthcare brought her to Wisconsin, where she started working in hospitals in Milwaukee and moved to the Fox Valley in 1984.

Before entering politics, Bernard Schaber worked as a physical therapist in local hospitals, community nursing homes, in private practice, and in schools. With a passion for the environment, she was active in the Fox River Cleanup Plan. In order to obtain a better understanding of environmental issues, Bernard Schaber returned to school in 1985 to complete an Associate Degree in Natural Resources at Fox Valley Technical College. As a member of the Fox Valley Sierra Group and as Chairperson for Wisconsin’s John Muir Chapter for the Sierra Club, she has been very active in local and statewide natural resources.

In 2008 Bernard Schaber was elected into the Wisconsin State Assembly from the 57th District after defeating Jo Egelhoff in the November general election.

Bernard Schaber won re-election November 2, 2010 defeating Republican challenger Chris Hanson.

Bernard Schaber was re-elected to a third term on November 6, 2012 after receiving a write-in challenger, Brian Garrow. Bernard Schaber received 19,862 or 94% of the votes cast in the 57th Assembly District.

=== Committee assignments ===
In the 2009–2010 Legislative Session, Bernard Schaber was a member of the Health and Health Care Reform Committee, the Public Health Committee, the Transportation Committee and was Vice-Chair of the Jobs, the Economy, and Small Business Committee.

In the 2011–2012 Legislative Session, Rep. Bernard Schaber was a member of the Jobs, Economy and Small Business Committee, the Transportation Committee, and was the minority ranking member on the Aging and Long-Term Care Committee.

In the 2013–2014 Legislative Session, Bernard Schaber serves on the Jobs, Economy and Mining Committee and is the minority ranking member of the Aging and Long-Term Care Committee, the Transportation Committee and the Joint Survey Committee on Tax Exemptions. In addition, she is a member of the Governor's Council on Highway Safety.

=== Campaign for State Senate ===
On July 23, 2013 Bernard Schaber announced her campaign for Wisconsin State Senate, challenging long-time incumbent Senator Mike Ellis

On April 11, 2014 Senator Mike Ellis dropped his bid for re-election. Bernard Schaber was defeated by Roger Roth on November 4, 2014. Amanda Stuck was elected to the Wisconsin State Assembly to succeed Bernard Schaber. In 2015, Bernard Schaber was elected to be a member of the state governing board of Common Cause Wisconsin, the state's largest non-partisan citizen reform advocacy organization with more than 18,000 members and activists. In 2022, she was elected as Co-chair of Common Cause Wisconsin, along with former Republican State Rep. and retired Wisconsin Court of Appeals Judge David Deininger of Monroe, WI.
