= Wisconsin's 8th congressional district =

U.S. House district for Wisconsin

Coordinates: 44°49′53″N 87°56′13″W

- Interactive map of district boundaries since January 3, 2023
- Representative: Tony Wied; R–De Pere
- Area: 9,807.64 mi^{2} (25,401.7 km^{2})
- Distribution: 60.84% rural; 39.16% urban
- Population (2025): 753,700
- Median household income: $80,755
- Ethnicity: 82.81% White; 7.40% Hispanic; 7.24% Two or more races; 2.88% other; 2.67% Native American; 2.52% Asian; 1.86% Black; 0.01% Pacific Islander Americans
- Cook PVI: R+8
- Created: 1873

Wisconsin's 8th congressional district is a congressional district of the United States House of Representatives in northeastern Wisconsin. It has been represented by Republican Tony Wied since November 12, 2024. It was previously vacant from April 24, 2024, following the effective date of the resignation of Mike Gallagher, a Republican. Gallagher won the open seat vacated by Reid Ribble who retired in 2016. It is also one of only three congressional districts to ever elect a Catholic priest, Robert John Cornell having represented the district from 1975 to 1979. The other Catholic priest was Robert Drinan, who represented Massachusetts's 3rd and later 4th congressional districts from 1971 to 1981.

The 8th District has leaned Republican throughout its history; seven Democrats have represented it since its creation in 1873, but none have served more than two terms. It became more of a swing seat in the 1990s. In 2004, Republican George W. Bush won 55 percent of the vote in the district, while in 2008, Democrat Barack Obama received 53.6 percent of the vote. The last Democrat to represent the district was Steve Kagen from 2007 to 2011. Since Kagen lost in the 2010 election, the seat has been held by Republicans, who have consistently won it by double-digit percent margins in each election to the seat since 2012 and won similarly in statewide elections. The only county in the current district to back the Democratic presidential candidate in the 2000, 2004, and 2016 elections was overwhelmingly Native American Menominee County, which has never voted Republican since its creation in 1960, and only Menominee and Door Counties voted Democratic in 2012, 2020, and 2024.

== Counties and municipalities within the district ==
For the 118th and successive Congresses (based on redistricting following the 2020 census), the district contains all or portions of the following counties, towns, and municipalities:

Brown County (24)

All 24 towns and municipalities

Calumet County (15)

Appleton (part; also 6th; shared with Outagamie and Winnebago counties), Brillion (city), Brillion (town), Charlestown, Chilton (city), Chilton (town), Harrison, Hilbert, Menasha (part; also 6th; shared with Winnebago County), Potter, Rantoul, Sherwood, Stockbridge (town), Stockbridge (village), Woodville

Door County (19)

All 19 towns and municipalities

Kewaunee County (14)

All 14 towns and municipalities

Marinette County (25)

All 25 towns and municipalities

Menominee County (1)

Menominee

Oconto County (29)

All 29 towns and municipalities

Outagamie County (35)

All 35 towns and municipalities

Shawano County (38)

All 38 towns and municipalities

Waupaca County (34)

All 34 towns and municipalities

Winnebago County (2)

Clayton (part; also 6th), Winchester (part; also 6th)

== Recent election results from statewide races ==
Year	Office	Results
2008	President	Obama 54% - 45%
2010	Senate	Johnson 57% - 42%
2010	Governor	Walker 56% - 43%
2010	Secretary of State	King 51% - 49%
2010	Attorney General	Van Hollen 64% - 36%
2010	Treasurer	Schuller 59% - 41%
2012	President	Romney 52% - 48%
2012	Senate	Thompson 50% - 47%
2012	Governor (Recall)	Walker 62% - 38%
2014	Governor	Walker 60% - 39%
2014	Secretary of State	Bradley 52% - 45%
2014	Attorney General	Schimel 58% - 38%
2014	Treasurer	Adamczyk 55% - 38%
2016	President	Trump 56% - 38%
2016	Senate	Johnson 59% - 38%
2018	Senate	Vukmir 51% - 49%
2018	Governor	Walker 56% - 42%
2018	Secretary of State	Schroeder 55% - 45%
2018	Attorney General	Schimel 56% - 42%
2018	Treasurer	Hartwig 54% - 43%
2020	President	Trump 57% - 41%
2022	Senate	Johnson 59% - 41%
2022	Governor	Michels 56% - 43%
2022	Secretary of State	Loudenbeck 56% - 40%
2022	Attorney General	Toney 57% - 43%
2022	Treasurer	Leiber 58% - 40%
2024	President	Trump 57% - 41%
2024	Senate	Hovde 56% - 42%

== List of members representing the district ==
Member	Party	Years	Cong ress	Electoral history	District
District established March 4, 1873
Alexander S. McDill (Plover)	Republican	March 4, 1873 – March 3, 1875	43rd	Elected in 1872. Lost re-election.	Adams, Ashland, Barron, Bayfield, Burnett, Chippewa, Douglas, Dunn, Juneau, Marathon, Marquette, Oconto, Polk, Portage, Shawano, & Wood counties (& Langlade, Lincoln, Marinette, Price, & Taylor counties created from this territory during the 1870s)
George W. Cate (Stevens Point)	Democratic	March 4, 1875 – March 3, 1877	44th	Elected in 1874. Lost re-election.	Adams, Ashland, Barron, Bayfield, Burnett, Chippewa, Douglas, Dunn, Juneau, Marathon, Marquette, Oconto, Polk, Portage, Shawano, & Wood counties (& Langlade, Lincoln, Marinette, Price, & Taylor counties created from this territory during the 1870s)
Thaddeus C. Pound (Chippewa Falls)	Republican	March 4, 1877 – March 3, 1883	45th 46th 47th	Elected in 1876. Re-elected in 1878. Re-elected in 1880. Retired.	Adams, Ashland, Barron, Bayfield, Burnett, Chippewa, Douglas, Dunn, Juneau, Marathon, Marquette, Oconto, Polk, Portage, Shawano, & Wood counties (& Langlade, Lincoln, Marinette, Price, & Taylor counties created from this territory during the 1870s)
William T. Price (Black River Falls)	Republican	March 4, 1883 – December 6, 1886	48th 49th	Elected in 1882. Re-elected in 1884. Died.	Bayfield, Barron, Buffalo, Burnett, Clark, Douglas, Dunn, Eau Claire, Jackson, Pepin, Pierce, Polk, St. Croix, & Trempealeau counties
Vacant		December 6, 1886 – January 18, 1887	49th		Bayfield, Barron, Buffalo, Burnett, Clark, Douglas, Dunn, Eau Claire, Jackson, Pepin, Pierce, Polk, St. Croix, & Trempealeau counties
Hugh H. Price (Black River Falls)	Republican	January 18, 1887 – March 3, 1887	49th	Elected to finish his father's term. Retired.	Bayfield, Barron, Buffalo, Burnett, Clark, Douglas, Dunn, Eau Claire, Jackson, Pepin, Pierce, Polk, St. Croix, & Trempealeau counties
Nils P. Haugen (River Falls)	Republican	March 4, 1887 – March 3, 1893	50th 51st 52nd	Elected in 1886. Re-elected in 1888. Re-elected in 1890. Redistricted to the 10th district.	Bayfield, Barron, Buffalo, Burnett, Clark, Douglas, Dunn, Eau Claire, Jackson, Pepin, Pierce, Polk, St. Croix, & Trempealeau counties
Lyman E. Barnes (Appleton)	Democratic	March 4, 1893 – March 3, 1895	53rd	Elected in 1892. Lost re-election.	Brown, Door, Kewaunee, Outagamie, Portage, Waupaca, & Wood counties
Edward S. Minor (Sturgeon Bay)	Republican	March 4, 1895 – March 3, 1903	54th 55th 56th 57th	Elected in 1894. Re-elected in 1896. Re-elected in 1898. Re-elected in 1900. Redistricted to the 9th district.	Brown, Door, Kewaunee, Outagamie, Portage, Waupaca, & Wood counties
James H. Davidson (Oshkosh)	Republican	March 4, 1903 – March 3, 1913	58th 59th 60th 61st 62nd	Redistricted from the 6th district and re-elected in 1902. Re-elected in 1904. Re-elected in 1906. Re-elected in 1908. Re-elected in 1910. Lost re-election.	Calumet, Manitowoc, Portage, Waupaca, Waushara, & Winnebago counties
Edward E. Browne (Waupaca)	Republican	March 4, 1913 – March 3, 1931	63rd 64th 65th 66th 67th 68th 69th 70th 71st	Elected in 1912. Re-elected in 1914. Re-elected in 1916. Re-elected in 1918. Re-elected in 1920. Re-elected in 1922. Re-elected in 1924. Re-elected in 1926. Re-elected in 1928. Lost renomination.	Marathon, Portage, Shawano, Waupaca, Waushara, & Wood counties
Gerald J. Boileau (Wausau)	Republican	March 4, 1931 – March 3, 1933	72nd	Elected in 1930. Redistricted to the 7th district.	Marathon, Portage, Shawano, Waupaca, Waushara, & Wood counties
James F. Hughes (De Pere)	Democratic	March 4, 1933 – January 3, 1935	73rd	Elected in 1932. Retired.	Brown, Door, Florence, Forest, Kewaunee, Manitowoc, Marinette, Oconto, & Outagamie counties
George J. Schneider (Appleton)	Progressive	January 3, 1935 – January 3, 1939	74th 75th	Elected in 1934. Re-elected in 1936. Lost re-election.	Brown, Door, Florence, Forest, Kewaunee, Manitowoc, Marinette, Oconto, & Outagamie counties
Joshua L. Johns (Appleton)	Republican	January 3, 1939 – January 3, 1943	76th 77th	Elected in 1938. Re-elected in 1940. Lost re-election.	Brown, Door, Florence, Forest, Kewaunee, Manitowoc, Marinette, Oconto, & Outagamie counties
LaVern Dilweg (Green Bay)	Democratic	January 3, 1943 – January 3, 1945	78th	Elected in 1942. Lost re-election.	Brown, Door, Florence, Forest, Kewaunee, Manitowoc, Marinette, Oconto, & Outagamie counties
John W. Byrnes (Green Bay)	Republican	January 3, 1945 – January 3, 1973	79th 80th 81st 82nd 83rd 84th 85th 86th 87th 88th	Elected in 1944. Re-elected in 1946. Re-elected in 1948. Re-elected in 1950. Re-elected in 1952. Re-elected in 1954. Re-elected in 1956. Re-elected in 1958. Re-elected in 1960. Re-elected in 1962.	Brown, Door, Florence, Forest, Kewaunee, Manitowoc, Marinette, Oconto, & Outagamie counties
John W. Byrnes (Green Bay)	Republican	January 3, 1945 – January 3, 1973	89th 90th 91st 92nd	Re-elected in 1964. Re-elected in 1966. Re-elected in 1968. Re-elected in 1970. Retired.	Brown, Door, Kewaunee, Manitowoc, Marinette, Oconto, & Outagamie counties
Harold V. Froehlich (Appleton)	Republican	January 3, 1973 – January 3, 1975	93rd	Elected in 1972. Lost re-election.	Door, Florence, Forest, Kewaunee, Langlade, Marinette, Menominee, Oconto, Outagamie, Shawano, Vilas, & Waupaca counties & most of Brown County & part of Oneida County: Brown County; all of Brown County except the town of Morrison; Oneida County; Town of Enterprise
Robert John Cornell (De Pere)	Democratic	January 3, 1975 – January 3, 1979	94th 95th	Elected in 1974. Re-elected in 1976. Lost re-election.	Door, Florence, Forest, Kewaunee, Langlade, Marinette, Menominee, Oconto, Outagamie, Shawano, Vilas, & Waupaca counties & most of Brown County & part of Oneida County: Brown County; all of Brown County except the town of Morrison; Oneida County; Town of Enterprise
Toby Roth (Appleton)	Republican	January 3, 1979 – January 3, 1997	96th 97th 98th 99th 100th 101st 102nd 103rd 104th	Elected in 1978. Re-elected in 1980. Re-elected in 1982. Re-elected in 1984. Re-elected in 1986. Re-elected in 1988. Re-elected in 1990. Re-elected in 1992. Re-elected in 1994. Retired.	Door, Florence, Forest, Kewaunee, Langlade, Marinette, Menominee, Oconto, Outagamie, Shawano, Vilas, & Waupaca counties & most of Brown County & part of Oneida County: Brown County; all of Brown County except the town of Morrison; Oneida County; Town of Enterprise
Toby Roth (Appleton)	Republican	January 3, 1979 – January 3, 1997	96th 97th 98th 99th 100th 101st 102nd 103rd 104th	Elected in 1978. Re-elected in 1980. Re-elected in 1982. Re-elected in 1984. Re-elected in 1986. Re-elected in 1988. Re-elected in 1990. Re-elected in 1992. Re-elected in 1994. Retired.	Brown, Door, Florence, Forest, Kewaunee, Langlade, Marinette, Menominee, Oconto, Outagamie, Shawano, & Vilas counties & most of Oneida County: Town of Cassian; Town of Hazelhurst; Town of Lake Tomahawk; Town of Little Rice; Town of Lynne; Town of Minocqua; Town of Newbold; Town of Nokomis; Town of Piehl; Town of Pine Lake; Town of Stella; Town of Sugar Camp; Town of Three Lakes; Town of Woodboro; Town of Woodruff
Toby Roth (Appleton)	Republican	January 3, 1979 – January 3, 1997	96th 97th 98th 99th 100th 101st 102nd 103rd 104th	Elected in 1978. Re-elected in 1980. Re-elected in 1982. Re-elected in 1984. Re-elected in 1986. Re-elected in 1988. Re-elected in 1990. Re-elected in 1992. Re-elected in 1994. Retired.	1993–2003
Jay Johnson (Green Bay)	Democratic	January 3, 1997 – January 3, 1999	105th	Elected in 1996. Lost re-election.	1993–2003
Mark Green (Green Bay)	Republican	January 3, 1999 – January 3, 2007	106th 107th 108th 109th	Elected in 1998. Re-elected in 2000. Re-elected in 2002. Re-elected in 2004. Retired to run for Governor of Wisconsin.	1993–2003
Mark Green (Green Bay)	Republican	January 3, 1999 – January 3, 2007	106th 107th 108th 109th	Elected in 1998. Re-elected in 2000. Re-elected in 2002. Re-elected in 2004. Retired to run for Governor of Wisconsin.	2003–2013
Steve Kagen (Appleton)	Democratic	January 3, 2007 – January 3, 2011	110th 111th	Elected in 2006. Re-elected in 2008. Lost re-election.	2003–2013
Reid Ribble (Sherwood)	Republican	January 3, 2011 – January 3, 2017	112th 113th 114th	Elected in 2010. Re-elected in 2012. Re-elected in 2014. Retired.	2003–2013
Reid Ribble (Sherwood)	Republican	January 3, 2011 – January 3, 2017	112th 113th 114th	Elected in 2010. Re-elected in 2012. Re-elected in 2014. Retired.	2013–2023
Mike Gallagher (Green Bay)	Republican	January 3, 2017 – April 24, 2024	115th 116th 117th 118th	Elected in 2016. Re-elected in 2018. Re-elected in 2020. Re-elected in 2022. Resigned.	2013–2023
Mike Gallagher (Green Bay)	Republican	January 3, 2017 – April 24, 2024	115th 116th 117th 118th	Elected in 2016. Re-elected in 2018. Re-elected in 2020. Re-elected in 2022. Resigned.	2023–present
Vacant		April 24, 2024 – November 12, 2024	118th		2023–present
Tony Wied (De Pere)	Republican	November 12, 2024 – present	118th 119th	Elected to finish Gallagher's term. Elected to full term in 2024. Re-elected in 2026.	2023–present

== Recent election results ==
=== 2002 district boundaries (2002–2011) ===
Year	Date	Elected				Defeated				Total	Plurality
2002	Nov. 5	Mark Green (inc)	Republican	152,745	72.58%	Andrew M. Becker	Dem.	50,284	23.89%	210,447	102,461
2002	Nov. 5	Mark Green (inc)	Republican	152,745	72.58%	Dick Kaiser	Grn.	7,338	3.49%	210,447	102,461
2004	Nov. 2	Mark Green (inc)	Republican	248,070	70.13%	Dottie Le Clair	Dem.	105,513	29.83%	353,725	142,557
2006	Nov. 7	Steve Kagen	Democratic	141,570	50.90%	John Gard	Rep.	135,622	48.76%	278,135	5,948
2008	Nov. 4	Steve Kagen (inc)	Democratic	193,662	54.00%	John Gard	Rep.	164,621	45.90%	358,647	29,041
2010	Nov. 2	Reid Ribble	Republican	143,998	54.77%	Steve Kagen (inc)	Dem.	118,646	45.12%	262,938	25,352

=== 2011 district boundaries (2012–2021) ===
Year	Date	Elected				Defeated				Total	Plurality
2012	Nov. 6	Reid Ribble (inc)	Republican	198,874	55.95%	Jamie Wall	Dem.	156,287	43.97%	355,464	42,587
2014	Nov. 4	Reid Ribble (inc)	Republican	188,553	65.01%	Ron Gruett	Dem.	101,345	34.94%	290,048	87,208
2016	Nov. 8	Mike Gallagher	Republican	227,892	62.65%	Tom Nelson	Dem.	135,682	37.30%	363,780	92,210
2016	Nov. 8	Mike Gallagher	Republican	227,892	62.65%	Wendy Gribben (write-in)	Grn.	16	0.00%	363,780	92,210
2016	Nov. 8	Mike Gallagher	Republican	227,892	62.65%	Jerry Kobishop (write-in)	Dem.	2	0.00%	363,780	92,210
2018	Nov. 6	Mike Gallagher (inc)	Republican	209,410	63.69%	Beau Liegeois	Dem.	119,265	36.28%	328,774	90,145
2020	Nov. 3	Mike Gallagher (inc)	Republican	268,173	64.18%	Amanda Stuck	Dem.	149,558	35.79%	417,838	118,615

=== 2022 district boundaries (2022–2031) ===
Year	Date	Elected				Defeated				Total	Plurality
2022	Nov. 8	Mike Gallagher (inc)	Republican	223,981	72.21%	Paul Boucher	Independent	48,896	15.80%	310,196	175,085
2022	Nov. 8	Mike Gallagher (inc)	Republican	223,981	72.21%	Jacob VandenPlas	Libertarian	32,057	10.30%	310,196	175,085
2022	Nov. 8	Mike Gallagher (inc)	Republican	223,981	72.21%	Julie Hancock (write-in)	Dem.	3,160	1.02%	310,196	175,085
2022	Nov. 8	Mike Gallagher (inc)	Republican	223,981	72.21%	Robbie Hoffman (write-in)	Dem.	135	0.04%	310,196	175,085
2024	Nov. 5	Tony Wied	Republican	240,040	57.3%	Kristin Lyerly	Dem.	178,666	42.6%	418,978	
2024	Nov. 5	Tony Wied	Republican	240,040	57.3%	Write-in	Independent	272	0.1%	418,978	

== See also ==
- Wisconsin's congressional districts
- List of United States congressional districts
