= Terri McCormick =

American politician

Terri McCormick (born October 24, 1956) is a former Wisconsin State Representative.

McCormick was born in Waupun, Wisconsin on October 24, 1956. She began college at the two-year University of Wisconsin–Fond du Lac then attended the University of Wisconsin–Oshkosh, where she graduated with a bachelor's degree in political science. She obtained a master's degree in administrative leadership from Marian University in Fond du Lac. She also did post graduate work at the University of Windsor.

After graduating she started working on education issues, and was involved with the Wisconsin Charter School Association.

McCormick was elected to the Wisconsin State Assembly in 2000 and represented the 56th district in the northeastern part of the state until 2007. She was honored in 2003 by the Wisconsin Office of the Public Defender, and in 2004 by the Wisconsin Bar Association, for her efforts to expand eligibility for public defender representation.

She unsuccessfully sought the Republican nomination in Wisconsin's 8th congressional District in 2006, losing to John Gard. McCormick again failed to secure the Republican nomination in 2010, garnering 18% of the vote and losing to both Roger Roth (32%) and the primary winner, Reid Ribble (48%). She then opened a consulting firm.
