= National Roofing Contractors Association =

Construction industry trade association

The National Roofing Contractors Association is one of the US construction industry's trade associations and a voice in the roofing industry for information, education, technology, and advocacy. Founded in 1886, the NRCA is a nonprofit association that represents all segments of the roofing industry, including contractors; manufacturers; distributors; architects; consultants; engineers; building owners; and city, state, and government agencies. "The association has more than 3,500 members from all 50 states and 53 countries and is affiliated with 97 local, state, regional and international roofing contractor associations”.

Professional Roofing is NRCA's monthly publication. McKay Daniels is the current chief executive officer. Former CEOs include Reid Ribble.

The NRCA organizes National Roofing Week each year to raise awareness of the "significance of roofs to every home and business".

It also publishes books for the industry which are referenced by other publishers.
