= Steve Kagen =

American politician from Wisconsin (born 1949)

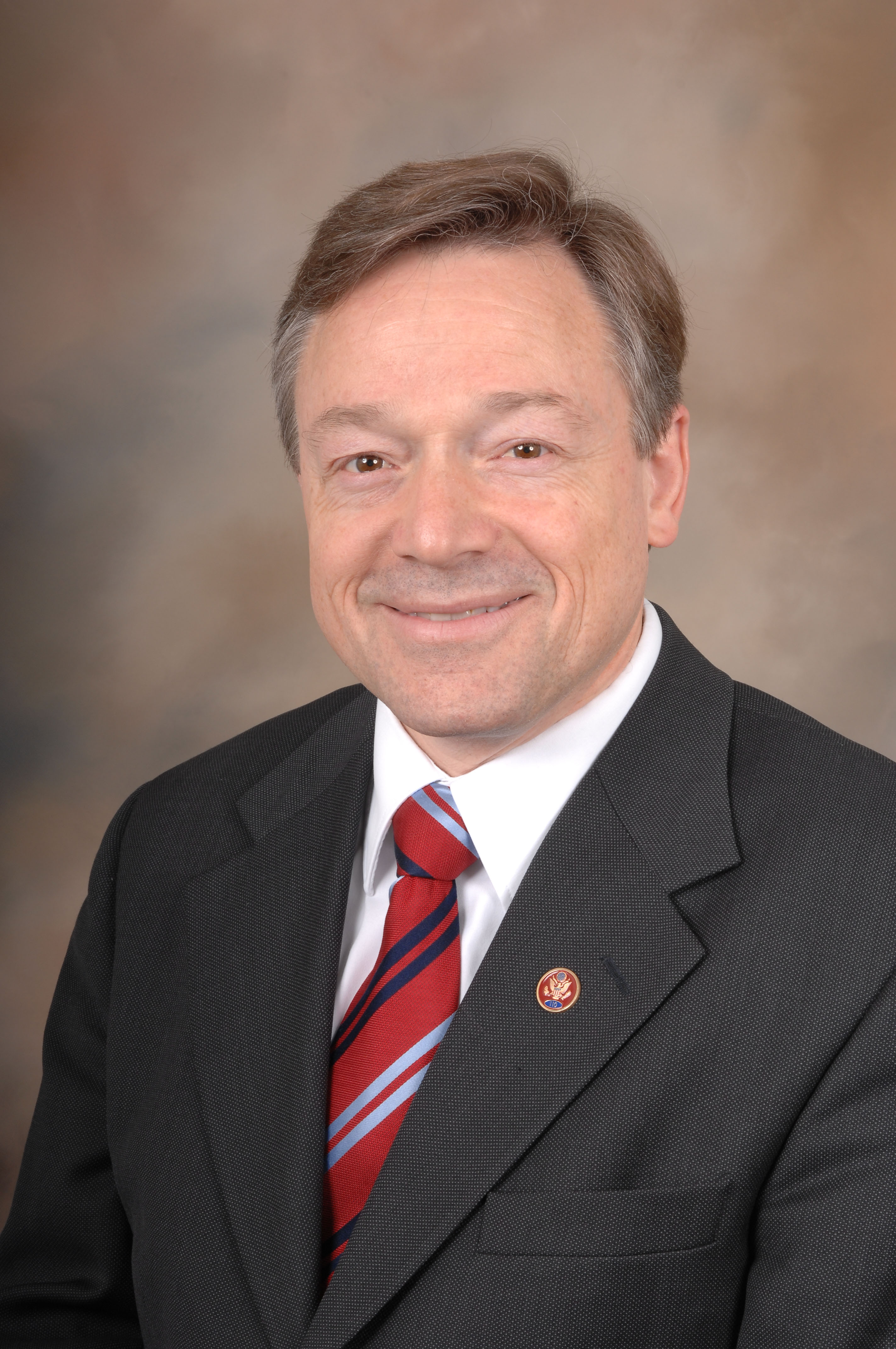
- Official portrait, 2007

Member of the U.S. House of Representatives from Wisconsin's 8th district
- In office January 3, 2007 – January 3, 2011
- Preceded by: Mark Green
- Succeeded by: Reid Ribble

Personal details
- Born: Steven Leslie Kagen; December 12, 1949 (age 76) Appleton, Wisconsin, U.S.
- Party: Democratic
- Spouse: Amy Kagen
- Education: University of Wisconsin, Madison (BS, MD)

Steven Leslie Kagen (born December 12, 1949) is an American politician and physician who was the U.S. representative for Wisconsin's 8th congressional district from 2007 to 2011. He is a member of the Democratic Party. He was defeated in his bid for re-election in 2010 by Reid Ribble, who succeeded him on January 3, 2011. The district is located in the northeastern part of the state and includes Green Bay and Appleton.

== Early life and education ==
Kagen was born on December 12, 1949, in Appleton, Wisconsin. After graduating from Appleton East High School, Kagen attended the University of Wisconsin–Madison, where he earned a degree in molecular biology, with honors. Kagen then entered medical school, and later trained at both Northwestern University in Chicago, Illinois, and the Medical College of Wisconsin in Milwaukee. He is board certified in internal medicine; allergy, asthma and immunology; and diagnostic laboratory immunology.

Kagen's father, Marv, also a doctor, was an unsuccessful Democratic Congressional candidate in 1966. The younger Kagen performed volunteer work for his father's campaign and cited his father's campaign as a major factor in his interest in politics.

== Medical career ==
Kagen founded four medical clinics in Appleton, Green Bay, Fond du Lac, and Oshkosh.

Before his election, he also served as an assistant clinical professor at the Medical College of Wisconsin. He served for seven years as the allergy consultant to CNN.

== U.S. House of Representatives ==
=== Committee assignments ===
- Committee on Agriculture
  - Subcommittee on Department Operations, Oversight, Nutrition and Forestry
  - Subcommittee on Livestock, Dairy, and Poultry
- Committee on Transportation and Infrastructure
  - Subcommittee on Coast Guard and Maritime Transportation
  - Subcommittee on Highways and Transit
  - Subcommittee on Water Resources and Environment

== Political positions ==
Kagen supported and voted for the 911 Commission Recommendations Act, the Minimum Wage increase, the SCHIP Children's Health Bill, the "Pay As You Go" Bill, campaign and lobbying reforms, oversight of FISA warrants and terror surveillance. He is a cosponsor of the Pharmaceutical Market Access and Drug Safety Act (H.R.380). This legislation would allow the importation of drugs from Canada for personal use and from an importer registered by the Secretary of the Department of Health and Human Services. Kagen is also a cosponsor of the Medicare Prescription Drug Price Negotiation Act of 2007 (H.R. 4) and voted in favor of its passage in the U.S. House of Representatives in January 2007. The U.S. Senate has yet to consider this measure. Kagen has voted for all military appropriations bills, and authored a bill, the Rural Veterans Mental Health Improvement Act (H.R. 4231), which would expand mental health coverage for veterans.

=== "No Patient Left Behind" ===
Kagen accepts an award from the Visiting Nurse Associations of America in 2010.

The predominant legislative issue Kagen stressed during his 2006 campaign was an initiative he called "No Patient Left Behind." This proposal provides for open disclosure of all health care-related prices, unitary pricing where every citizen pays the same amount for the same product or service, a single insurance risk pool to leverage down insurance and prescription drug prices, set deductibles at 3% of a household's federal taxable income, and provide coverage to all children and working adults.

Kagen declined to participate in the Congressional health care plan until all Americans had access to affordable health care. In a post on the Daily Kos, Kagen said, "I did not run for this office to get health care benefits."

=== Gas Price Relief for Consumers Act of 2008 ===
On May 15, 2008, legislation sponsored by Kagen titled "To amend the Sherman Act to make oil-producing and exporting cartels illegal and for other purposes" (H.R.6074) was introduced before the House. On May 19, 2008, the House overwhelmingly decided in a 324–84 vote to approve this legislation, which allows the Justice Department to sue any foreign state that limits the production/distribution of oil or engages in price fixing.

== Political campaigns ==
=== 2006 ===
On September 12, 2006, Kagen, a first-time candidate, won the Democratic Party nomination for Wisconsin's 8th District. The seat had been left open by the four-term incumbent Republican, Mark Green, who unsuccessfully ran for Governor of Wisconsin. On November 7, Kagen narrowly defeated Wisconsin Assembly Speaker John Gard of Peshtigo in the most expensive Congressional race in Wisconsin history, a race dominated by attack ads, mainly created by third-party 527 issue ad groups, outside the control of the candidate or parties. Some of the issues where Kagen and Gard disagreed were President George W. Bush's direction in the Iraq War, stem-cell research, and tax policy.

Kagen's campaign advertised that Wisconsin doctors voted him one of the "best doctors in America". He promised to fight to ensure that every American could get affordable health care.

Kagen won the 2006 election 51-49% against Gard and again defeated Gard in Brown County, home to Green Bay, in 2008. Kagen narrowly lost Gard's home county of Marinette. Kagen is the third Democrat to represent the 8th District since World War II.

Wisconsin's 8th congressional district Democratic primary, 2006
Party	Candidate	Votes	%
Democratic	Steve Kagen	25,523	47.55
Democratic	Jamie Wall	15,427	28.74
Democratic	Nancy Nusbaum	12,721	23.70
Total votes		53,671	100.00

Wisconsin's 8th congressional district election, 2006
Party	Candidate	Votes	%
Democratic	Steve Kagen	141,570	50.90
Republican	John Gard	135,622	48.76
Write-ins		943	0.34
Total votes		278,135	100.00
Democratic gain from Republican			

=== 2008 ===
Kagen faced a rematch against Gard in 2008. CQ Politics forecasted the race as 'Leans Democratic'. Kagen won reelection, defeating Gard with 54% of the vote, becoming only the third Democrat to win a second term in this district in 92 years (it was known as the 9th district before 1933).

Wisconsin's 8th congressional district election, 2008
Party	Candidate	Votes	%
Democratic	Steve Kagen (inc.)	193,662	54.00
Republican	John Gard	164,621	45.90
Write-ins		364	0.10
Total votes		358,647	100.00
Democratic hold			

=== 2010 ===
Kagen was defeated by Republican nominee Reid Ribble on November 2, 2010.

Wisconsin's 8th congressional district election, 2010
Party	Candidate	Votes	%
Republican	Reid Ribble	143,998	54.77
Democratic	Steve Kagen (inc.)	118,646	45.12
Write-ins		294	0.11
Total votes		262,938	100.00
Republican gain from Democratic			

=== 2012 ===
According to notes taken during a series of union endorsement interviews in January 2012 that were obtained by a local news reporter, Kagen strongly considered a run for the Democratic nomination to face Gov. Scott Walker in a recall election.

== Controversies ==
=== FDA compliance question ===
Kagen received a letter from the FDA regarding a compliance issue with one of his allergy formulas. News reports stated Kagen was accused of "selling allergy shots without a valid license." The formulation was registered with the FDA during manufacture and distribution, but was re-classified under a new regulation and required a new application. The FDA accepted the allergy clinic's decision to no longer offer that particular formulation and the FDA ended its license question.

=== Politically incorrect comment ===
After attending a campaign event on the Oneida reservation, and then in Green Bay, Wisconsin, on 20 October 2006, Kagen commented, in part:

Appreciate getting here almost on time. Our excuse in Oneida was, well, we're on Injun time. They don't tell time by the clock. Our excuse here is that I am a doctor and that we're never on time.

Kagen later apologized. The apology was accepted by the Oneida and other state tribes within two days.

=== Behavior at White House function ===
Kagen came under fire for a rumored comment at a November 13, 2006, White House function, after Appleton-area newspapers picked up on a story printed in an alternative paper, The Scene. According to the paper, Congressman-elect Kagen met presidential adviser Karl Rove in a bathroom and told him : "You recognize me? My name's Dr. Multimillionaire and I kicked your ass." The term "Dr. Multimillionaire" refers to the name "Dr. Millionaire" the Republican campaign used to refer to Kagen during the 2006 campaign. The Scene also said that the Congressman-elect thanked Vice President Cheney and President Bush for campaigning in Wisconsin for his opponent, telling them, "I couldn't have won without your help." It is reported that he then addressed First Lady Laura Bush as Barbara, saying "I learned on the campaign trail that the biggest insult you could do to another man is to call his wife by another name."

The White House officially denied the conversation took place, calling the story "ridiculous." Kagen talked to constituents about the reported verbal insults he delivered to the President and Mrs. Bush six days after the November election.

== See also ==
- List of Jewish members of the United States Congress

U.S. House of Representatives
Preceded by Mark Green	Member of the U.S. House of Representatives from Wisconsin's 8th congressional district 2007–2011	Succeeded by Reid Ribble
U.S. order of precedence (ceremonial)
Preceded by Mark Neumann as Former U.S. Representative	Order of precedence of the United States as Former U.S. Representative	Succeeded by Ed Zschau as Former U.S. Representative
