= Scott Lilly =

American political activists

Scott Lilly (born November 14, 1946) is an adjunct professor at the University of Texas′ Lyndon B. Johnson School of Public Affairs and Senior Fellow at the Center for American Progress.

== Early life ==
Lilly attended high school in Springfield, Missouri and is a graduate of Westminster College. In 2009 Westminster awarded him the Alumni Lifetime Achievement Award.

== Career ==
Prior to his service with the Congress, Lilly served as director of campaign services for the Democratic National Committee, central states coordinator in the McGovern Presidential Campaign, as a bill drafter for the Missouri legislature and two years in the U.S. Army. Following the McGovern campaign Lilly became a legislative assistant for Congressman Dave Obey of Wisconsin where he became Chief of Staff and Clerk for the House Appropriations Committee during Congressman David Obey's Chairmanship. During his 31 years on Capitol Hill Lilly held positions as Executive Director of the Joint Economic Committee and executive director of the House Democratic Study Group.

Following his retirement from The United States Congress, Lilly became a Senior Fellow at the Center for American Progress, served as an adjunct professor at Georgetown University's McCourt School of Public Policy and the Lyndon B. Johnson School of Public Affairs. While serving at the Center for American Progress, Lilly authored more than 170 columns and reports. His work appeared in numerous publications such as the Washington Post, U.S. News & World Report, Time Magazine and The New Republic. Lilly also is a frequent guest on various news outlets including CNN, CBS, NBC, CNBC, MSNBC, BBC, Al Jazeera, PBS and NPR.
