= Gwen Moore =

American politician (born 1951)

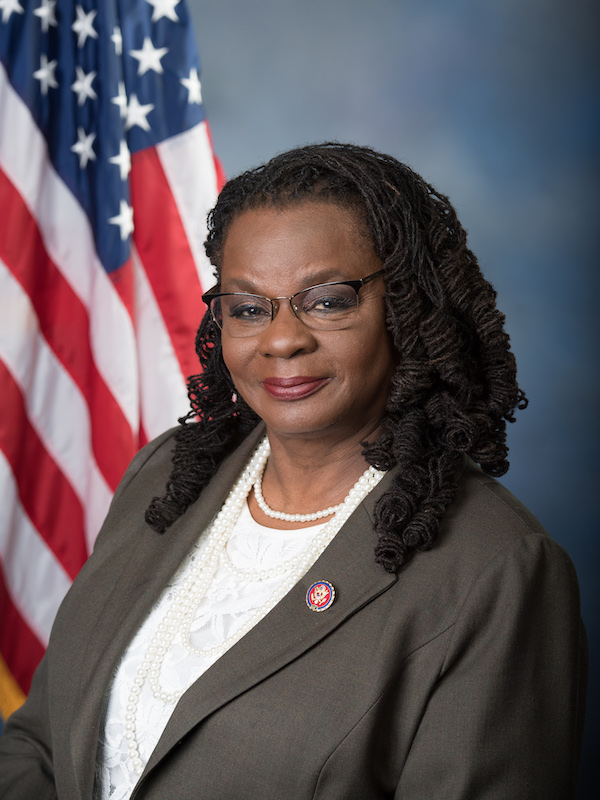
- Official portrait, 2019

Member of the U.S. House of Representatives from Wisconsin's 4th district
- Incumbent
- Assumed office January 3, 2005
- Preceded by: Jerry Kleczka

Member of the Wisconsin Senate from the 4th district
- In office January 4, 1993 – January 3, 2005
- Preceded by: Barbara Ulichny
- Succeeded by: Lena Taylor

Member of the Wisconsin State Assembly from the 7th district
- In office January 3, 1989 – January 4, 1993
- Preceded by: Dismas Becker
- Succeeded by: Peter Bock

Personal details
- Born: Gwendolynne Sophia Moore; April 18, 1951 (age 75) Racine, Wisconsin, U.S.
- Party: Democratic
- Children: 3, including Supreme
- Education: Marquette University (BA)
- Website: House website Campaign website
- Moore's voice Moore on maternal mortality in Pakistan. Recorded June 11, 2009

Gwendolynne Sophia Moore (born April 18, 1951) is an American politician serving as the U.S. representative for Wisconsin's 4th congressional district since 2005. A member of the Democratic Party, her district includes Milwaukee and several suburbs within Milwaukee County. Moore is the first woman to represent the 4th district as well as the second woman (after Tammy Baldwin) and the first African American elected to Congress from Wisconsin.

Moore is currently Wisconsin's longest serving representative, after Ron Kind retired in 2023. In 2016, Moore was elected to serve as caucus whip of the Congressional Black Caucus for the 115th United States Congress.

== Early life, education and career ==
Moore was born in Racine, Wisconsin, but has spent most of her life in Milwaukee. She is the eighth of nine children; her father was a factory worker and her mother a public school teacher. Moore attended North Division High School and served as student council president. She later attended Marquette University and became a single mother and welfare recipient. She earned a Bachelor of Arts degree in political science in 1973.

As an organizer with AmeriCorps VISTA, Moore worked to establish the Cream City Community Development Credit Union to offer grants and loans to low-income residents to start businesses. For her work, she was awarded the national "VISTA Volunteer of the Decade" award from 1976 to 1986. From 1985 to 1989, she worked for the City of Milwaukee as a neighborhood development strategist and for the state Department of Employment Relations and Health and Social Services. Moore also worked for the Wisconsin Housing and Economic Development Authority (WHEDA) as a housing officer.

== Wisconsin legislature ==
Moore was elected to the Wisconsin State Assembly in 1988 and served two terms representing the 7th district. She was a prominent voice calling for an investigation into the case of serial killer Jeffrey Dahmer, who lived two blocks from Moore.

In 1992, Moore was elected to the Wisconsin State Senate, in which she represented the 4th district from 1993 to 2005. She was the first African-American woman to be elected to the state senate and became a prominent voice against mandatory ID security measures to enter the Capitol. She said, "I am too often reminded [9/11 hijacker] Mohamed Atta had a photo ID. This will not tell people whether I am a terrorist. This disenfranchises people who come to their Capitol."

== U.S. House of Representatives ==
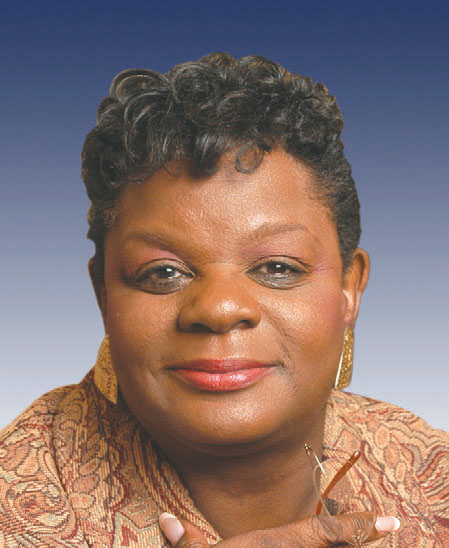
Moore during the 109th Congress

Moore was elected to the United States House of Representatives in 2004 with 69.6% of the vote, defeating Republican attorney Gerald Boyle. She was one of a handful of African Americans to be elected to Congress as freshmen in 2004, and the first African American and second woman (after Tammy Baldwin) to represent Wisconsin in Congress. Her district is based in Milwaukee and several Milwaukee County suburbs: Bayside, Brown Deer, Cudahy, Fox Point, Glendale, St. Francis, South Milwaukee, West Milwaukee, Shorewood, and Whitefish Bay.

Moore is a prominent advocate for women's rights, releasing frequent statements on topics ranging from domestic abuse awareness to abortion rights. In January 2011, she was elected Democratic co-chair of the Congressional Women's Caucus to become a leader on health insurance reform and the protection of reproductive rights. She is a member of the Congressional Progressive Caucus.

During the congressional debate in February 2011 on the Pence Amendment to defund Planned Parenthood, in response to comments from Paul Broun suggesting that Planned Parenthood promoted racist eugenics because more black women than white women have abortions, Moore spoke about her experience raising children on little money, and why "planned parenthood is healthy for women, it's healthy for children and it's healthy for our society". She publicly opposed the investigation into Planned Parenthood's financial accounting, saying the investigation was "an unfortunate waste of taxpayer dollars". Moore voted "nay" on Amends Patient Protection and Affordable Care Act to Prohibit Abortion Coverage on October 13, 2011. In March 2012, during the House debate over reauthorizing the Violence Against Women Act, she spoke about her experience of being sexually assaulted and raped as a child and an adult, criticizing the all-male Senate Judiciary Committee that voted "no" on the bill.

In the first session of the 109th Congress, Moore earned 90% and higher legislative agenda approval scores from Planned Parenthood of Wisconsin, the National Association for the Advancement of Colored People, the Sierra Club of Wisconsin, and the Service Employees International Union. She has focused legislatively on traditional Democratic and progressive issues, believing that the federal government should play a significant role in the amelioration of poverty and the resolution of difficult local problems. Moore has received support from interest groups including the American Civil Liberties Union (93%), The Human Rights Campaign (100%), The National Abortion and Reproductive Rights Action League (NARAL) (100%), The National Farmers Union (100%) and Defenders of Wildlife Action Fund (100%). She lacks support from those supporting hunting and sportsmen rights (0% support from Sportsmen's and Animal Owners' Voting Alliance), opponents of abortion rights (0% support from National Right to Life), and conservative tax reform stances (0% support from Americans for Tax Reform).

During her first term, Moore introduced legislation to provide economic incentives and tax cuts to small businesses to promote job creation, and also cosponsored legislation supporting community block grants, continuing and expanding Medicaid funding, amending the Truth in Lending Act to prevent so-called "predatory lending", and removing troops from Iraq. She also cosponsored two prospective amendments to the US Constitution, providing for uniform national election standards and prohibiting gender discrimination.

On May 6, 2006, Moore and eight fellow members of the Congressional Black Caucus were arrested and ticketed for unlawful assembly and disorderly conduct after they stepped onto the grounds of the Embassy of Sudan to call attention to the ongoing Darfur conflict. Moore said the group expected to be arrested but that they were pleased to participate in a "peaceful act of civil disobedience".

In July 2019, Moore voted against a House resolution introduced by Representative Brad Schneider opposing efforts to boycott the State of Israel and the Global Boycott, Divestment, and Sanctions Movement targeting Israel. The resolution passed 398-17. Moore chose not to attend Prime Minister Benjamin Netanyahu's address to the U.S. Congress in July 2024 to protest the Gaza-Israel conflict.

On December 18, 2019, Moore voted for both articles of impeachment against President Donald Trump.

In 2023, Moore was among 56 Democrats to vote in favor of H.Con.Res. 21, which directed President Joe Biden to remove U.S. troops from Syria within 180 days. Moore was among the 46 Democrats who voted against final passage of the Fiscal Responsibility Act of 2023 in the House.

=== Committee assignments ===
- Committee on Ways and Means
  - Subcommittee on Oversight
  - Subcommittee on Select Revenue Measures
  - Subcommittee on Worker and Family Support

=== Caucus memberships ===
- Black Maternal Health Caucus
- Congressional Equality Caucus
- Congressional Progressive Caucus
- Congressional Caucus on Foster Youth (co-chair)

== Personal life ==
Moore's son, Supreme Moore Omokunde (then known as Sowande Ajumoke Omokunde), was arrested in connection with the November 2, 2004, tire-slashing of Republican Party vehicles in Milwaukee. He was charged on January 24, 2005, with a felony in connection with the event, but agreed on January 20, 2006, to plead no contest in exchange for a sentencing recommendation of restitution and probation. On April 26, 2006, Milwaukee County Circuit Judge Michael B. Brennan disregarded the sentencing recommendation and sentenced Omokunde to four months in prison and $2,305 in fines and restitution. In response, Moore said, "I love my son very much. I'm very proud of him. He's accepted responsibility." Omokunde went on to become a member of the Milwaukee County Board of Supervisors in 2015, and was elected to the Wisconsin State Assembly in 2020.

Moore has become a U.S. delegate to the Parliamentary Assembly of the Organization for Security and Co-operation in Europe.

Moore attended the 2016 Democratic National Convention as a superdelegate, pledging her support to nominee Hillary Clinton. Moore spoke at the 2020 Democratic National Convention, which was centered in Milwaukee.

On December 28, 2020, Moore announced that she had tested positive for COVID-19 and was self-isolating from others. She traveled to Washington to vote for Nancy Pelosi as Speaker of the House after announcing that her quarantine period had ended.

Moore is a Baptist.

== Electoral history ==
=== Wisconsin Assembly (1988, 1990) ===
| Year | Election | Date | Elected | | | | Defeated | | | | Total | Plurality |
|---|---|---|---|---|---|---|---|---|---|---|---|---|
| 1988 | Primary | September 13 | Gwen Moore | Democratic | 2,463 | 52.71% | Charles E. Fox | Dem. | 1,613 | 34.52% | 4,673 | 850 |
| 1988 | Primary | September 13 | Gwen Moore | Democratic | 2,463 | 52.71% | Glenn O. Givens Jr. | Dem. | 597 | 12.78% | 4,673 | 850 |
| 1988 | General | November 8 | Gwen Moore | Democratic | 10,174 | 70.75% | Jeffrey S. Wuest | Rep. | 4,206 | 29.25% | 14,380 | 5,968 |
| 1990 | General | November 6 | Gwen Moore (inc.) | Democratic | 3,847 | 69.48% | Scott K. Walker | Rep. | 1,690 | 30.52% | 5,537 | 2,157 |

=== Wisconsin Senate (1992, 1996, 2000) ===
| Year | Election | Date | Elected | | | | Defeated | | | | Total | Plurality |
|---|---|---|---|---|---|---|---|---|---|---|---|---|
| 1992 | Primary | September 8 | Gwen Moore | Democratic | 11,066 | 54.43% | Louis Fortis | Dem. | 8,011 | 39.40% | 20,331 | 3,055 |
| 1992 | Primary | September 8 | Gwen Moore | Democratic | 11,066 | 54.43% | Phyllis Williams-Kirk | Dem. | 1,254 | 6.17% | 20,331 | 3,055 |
| 1992 | General | November 3 | Gwen Moore | Democratic | 47,571 | 100.0% | | | | | 47,571 | 47,571 |
| 1996 | Primary | September 10 | Gwen Moore (inc.) | Democratic | 6,277 | 78.45% | Henry Lampkins Jr. | Dem. | 1,724 | 21.55% | 8,001 | 4,553 |
| 1996 | General | November 5 | Gwen Moore (inc.) | Democratic | 38,018 | 100.0% | | | | | 38,018 | 38,018 |
| 2000 | General | November 7 | Gwen Moore (inc.) | Democratic | 47,980 | 99.09% | | | | | 48,423 | 47,537 |

=== U.S. House (2004–present) ===
| Year | Election | Date | Elected | | | | Defeated | | | | Total | Plurality |
|---|---|---|---|---|---|---|---|---|---|---|---|---|
| 2004 | Primary | September 14 | Gwen Moore | Democratic | 48,858 | 64.20% | Matt Flynn | Dem. | 19,377 | 25.46% | 76,103 | 29,481 |
| 2004 | Primary | September 14 | Gwen Moore | Democratic | 48,858 | 64.20% | Tim Carpenter | Dem. | 7,801 | 10.25% | 76,103 | 29,481 |
| 2004 | General | November 2 | Gwen Moore | Democratic | 212,382 | 69.60% | Gerald H. Boyle | Rep. | 85,928 | 28.16% | 305,142 | 126,454 |
| 2004 | General | November 2 | Gwen Moore | Democratic | 212,382 | 69.60% | Tim Johnson | Ind. | 3,733 | 1.22% | 305,142 | 126,454 |
| 2004 | General | November 2 | Gwen Moore | Democratic | 212,382 | 69.60% | Robert R. Raymond | Ind. | 1,861 | 0.61% | 305,142 | 126,454 |
| 2004 | General | November 2 | Gwen Moore | Democratic | 212,382 | 69.60% | Colin Hudson | Con. | 897 | 0.29% | 305,142 | 126,454 |
| 2006 | General | November 7 | Gwen Moore (inc.) | Democratic | 136,735 | 71.31% | Perfecto Rivera | Rep. | 54,486 | 28.42% | 191,742 | 82,249 |
| 2008 | General | November 4 | Gwen Moore (inc.) | Democratic | 222,728 | 87.63% | Michael D. LaForest | Rep. | 29,282 | 11.52% | 254,179 | 193,446 |
| 2010 | Primary | September 14 | Gwen Moore (inc.) | Democratic | 33,107 | 83.63% | Paul Morel | Dem. | 6,430 | 16.24% | 39,589 | 26,677 |
| 2010 | General | November 2 | Gwen Moore (inc.) | Democratic | 143,559 | 68.98% | Dan Sebring | Rep. | 61,543 | 29.57% | 208,103 | 82,016 |
| 2010 | General | November 2 | Gwen Moore (inc.) | Democratic | 143,559 | 68.98% | Eddie Ahmad Ayyash | Ind. | 2,802 | 1.35% | 208,103 | 82,016 |
| 2012 | General | November 6 | Gwen Moore (inc.) | Democratic | 235,257 | 72.21% | Dan Sebring | Rep. | 80,787 | 24.80% | 325,788 | 154,470 |
| 2012 | General | November 6 | Gwen Moore (inc.) | Democratic | 235,257 | 72.21% | Robert R. Raymond | Ind. | 9,277 | 2.85% | 325,788 | 154,470 |
| 2014 | Primary | August 12 | Gwen Moore (inc.) | Democratic | 52,413 | 70.91% | Gary R. George | Dem. | 21,242 | 28.74% | 73,912 | 31,171 |
| 2014 | General | November 4 | Gwen Moore (inc.) | Democratic | 179,045 | 70.24% | Dan Sebring | Rep. | 68,490 | 26.87% | 254,892 | 110,555 |
| 2014 | General | November 4 | Gwen Moore (inc.) | Democratic | 179,045 | 70.24% | Robert R. Raymond | Ind. | 7,002 | 2.75% | 254,892 | 110,555 |
| 2016 | Primary | August 9 | Gwen Moore (inc.) | Democratic | 55,256 | 84.49% | Gary R. George | Dem. | 10,013 | 15.31% | 65,397 | 45,243 |
| 2016 | General | November 8 | Gwen Moore (inc.) | Democratic | 220,181 | 76.74% | Robert R. Raymond | Ind. | 33,494 | 11.67% | 254,892 | 110,555 |
| 2016 | General | November 8 | Gwen Moore (inc.) | Democratic | 220,181 | 76.74% | Andy Craig | Lib. | 32,183 | 11.22% | 254,892 | 110,555 |
| 2018 | Primary | August 9 | Gwen Moore (inc.) | Democratic | 76,991 | 88.86% | Gary R. George | Dem. | 9,468 | 10.93% | 86,640 | 67,523 |
| 2018 | General | November 6 | Gwen Moore (inc.) | Democratic | 206,487 | 75.61% | Tim Rogers | Rep. | 59,091 | 21.64% | 273,087 | 147,396 |
| 2018 | General | November 6 | Gwen Moore (inc.) | Democratic | 206,487 | 75.61% | Robert R. Raymond | Ind. | 7,170 | 2.63% | 273,087 | 147,396 |
| 2020 | General | November 3 | Gwen Moore (inc.) | Democratic | 232,668 | 74.65% | Tim Rogers | Rep. | 70,769 | 22.70% | 311,697 | 161,899 |
| 2020 | General | November 3 | Gwen Moore (inc.) | Democratic | 232,668 | 74.65% | Robert R. Raymond | Ind. | 7,911 | 2.54% | 311,697 | 161,899 |
| 2022 | General | November 8 | Gwen Moore (inc.) | Democratic | 191,955 | 75.27% | Tim Rogers | Rep. | 57,660 | 22.62% | 255,012 | 134,295 |
| 2022 | General | November 8 | Gwen Moore (inc.) | Democratic | 191,955 | 75.27% | Robert R. Raymond | Ind. | 5,164 | 2.03% | 255,012 | 134,295 |
| 2024 | General | November 8 | Gwen Moore (inc.) | Democratic | 249,939 | 74.77% | Tim Rogers | Rep. | 74,921 | 22.41% | 334,282 | 175,018 |
| 2024 | General | November 8 | Gwen Moore (inc.) | Democratic | 249,939 | 74.77% | Robert R. Raymond | Ind. | 8,792 | 2.63% | 334,282 | 175,018 |

== See also ==
- List of African-American United States representatives
- Women in the United States House of Representatives

U.S. House of Representatives
| Preceded by Jerry Kleczka | Member of the U.S. House of Representatives from Wisconsin's 4th congressional district 2005–present | Incumbent |
Party political offices
| Preceded by Jan Schakowsky | Chair of the Democratic Women's Working Group; 2010–2013; Served alongside: Jan Schakowsky, Debbie Wasserman Schultz | Succeeded by Donna Edwards |
U.S. order of precedence (ceremonial)
| Preceded by Michael McCaul | United States representatives by seniority 50th | Succeeded by Debbie Wasserman Schultz |
| Preceded by Michael McCaul | Order of precedence of the United States | Succeeded by Jim Costa |
