= 2008 United States House of Representatives elections in Wisconsin =

- November 4, 2008

All 8 Wisconsin seats to the United States House of Representatives
	Majority party	Minority party
Party	Democratic	Republican
Last election	5	3
Seats won	5	3
Seat change	Steady	Steady
Popular vote	1,383,536	1,274,987
Percentage	49.85%	45.94%
Swing	▲1.23%	▼4.47%

Democratic
50–60%
60–70%
70–80%
80–90%
Republican
50–60%
60–70%
70–80%
80–90%

The 2008 congressional elections in Wisconsin were held on November 4, 2008, to determine who would represent the state of Wisconsin in the United States House of Representatives. Representatives were elected for two-year terms; those elected served in the 111th Congress from January 3, 2009, until January 3, 2011. The election coincided with the 2008 U.S. presidential election and other Wisconsin elections.

Wisconsin has eight seats in the House, apportioned according to the 2000 United States census. Its 2007-2008 congressional delegation consisted of five Democrats and three Republicans. That remained unchanged after the 2008 congressional elections in Wisconsin as all incumbent candidates won re-election, although CQ Politics had forecasted Wisconsin's 8 district to be at some risk for the incumbent party.

As of 2026, this is the last time the Democrats won a majority of congressional districts from Wisconsin. However, they would still go on to win the popular vote in several subsequent House elections.

== Results summary ==
Party	Candi- dates	Votes		Seats		
Party	Candi- dates	No.	%	No.	+/–	%
Democratic Party	7	1,383,536	49.85%	5	Steady	62.50%
Republican Party	7	1,274,987	45.94%	3	Steady	37.50%
Independent	2	103,809	3.74%	0	Steady	0%
Libertarian Party	2	12,842	0.46%	0	Steady	0%
Total	18	2,775,174	100%	8	Steady	100%

Popular vote
Democratic	49.85%
Republican	45.94%
Independent	3.74%
Libertarian	0.46%

House seats
Democratic	62.50%
Republican	37.50%

== District 1 ==
2008 Wisconsin's 1st congressional district election
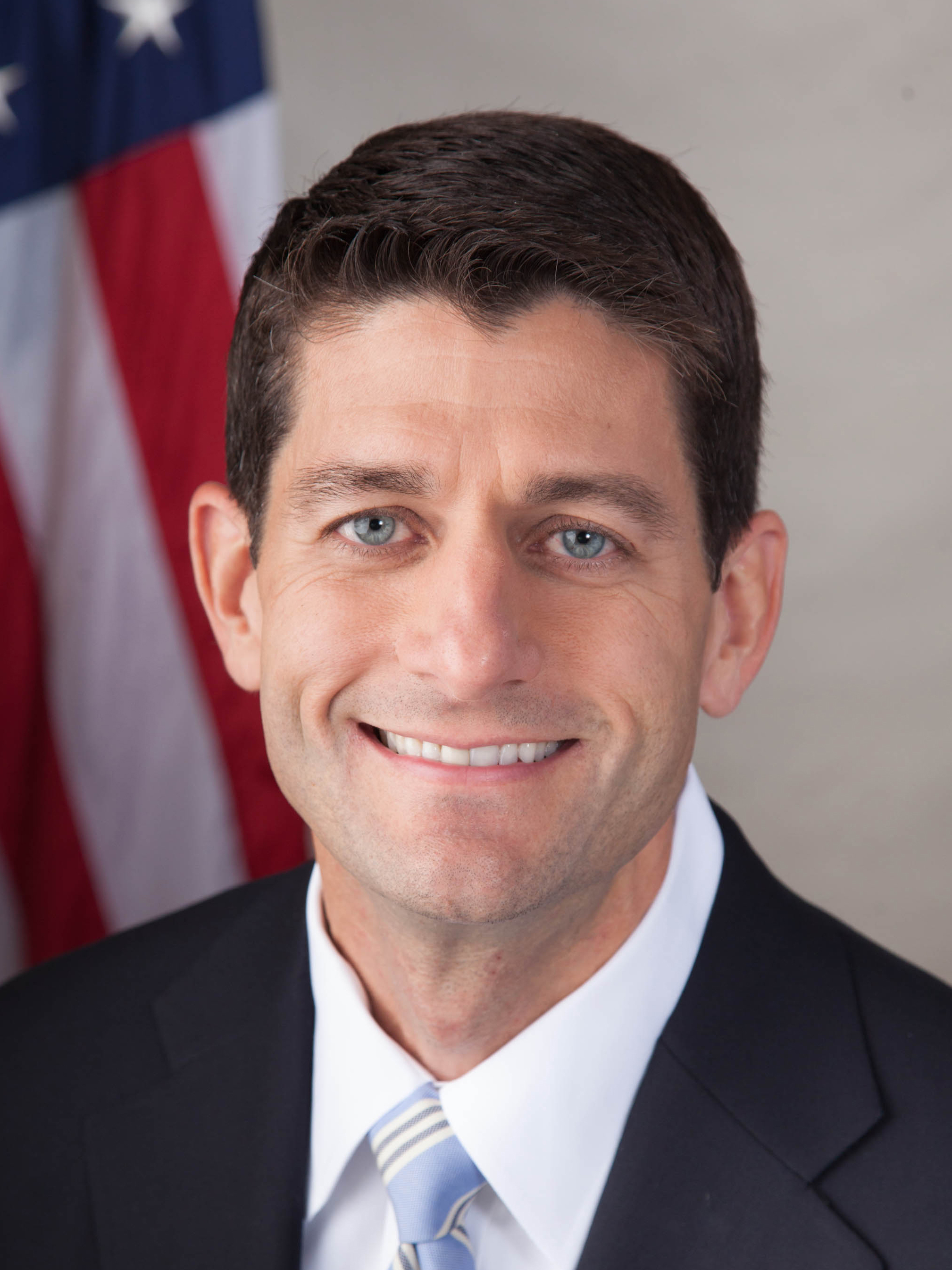

Nominee	Paul Ryan	Marge Krupp
Party	Republican	Democratic
Popular vote	231,009	125,268
Percentage	63.97%	34.69%
- Precinct results Ryan: 40–50% 50–60% 60–70% 70–80% 80–90% >90% Krupp: 40–50% 50–60% 60–70% 70–80% 80–90% Tie: 50% No votes
U.S. Representative before election
Paul Ryan
Republican
Elected U.S. Representative
Paul Ryan
Republican

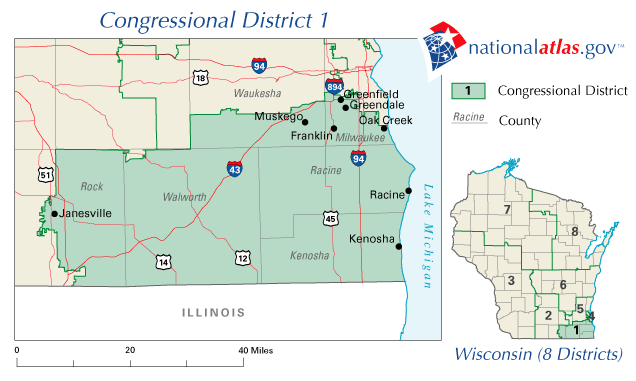

In this relatively moderate district in southeast Wisconsin, incumbent Republican Congressman Paul Ryan has enjoyed popularity and faced no serious challenge from Democratic nominee, Marge Krupp, a chemist. Despite Barack Obama's strong performance in Wisconsin that year in the presidential election, Ryan was re-elected overwhelmingly.

=== Predictions ===
Source	Ranking	As of
The Cook Political Report	Safe R	November 6, 2008
Rothenberg	Safe R	November 2, 2008
Sabato's Crystal Ball	Safe R	November 6, 2008
Real Clear Politics	Safe R	November 7, 2008
CQ Politics	Safe R	November 6, 2008

Wisconsin's 1st congressional district election, 2008
Party	Candidate	Votes	%
Republican	Paul Ryan (inc.)	231,009	63.97
Democratic	Marge Krupp	125,268	34.69
Libertarian	Joseph Kexel	4,606	1.28
Write-ins		224	0.06
Total votes		361,107	100.00
Republican hold			

== District 2 ==
2008 Wisconsin's 2nd congressional district election
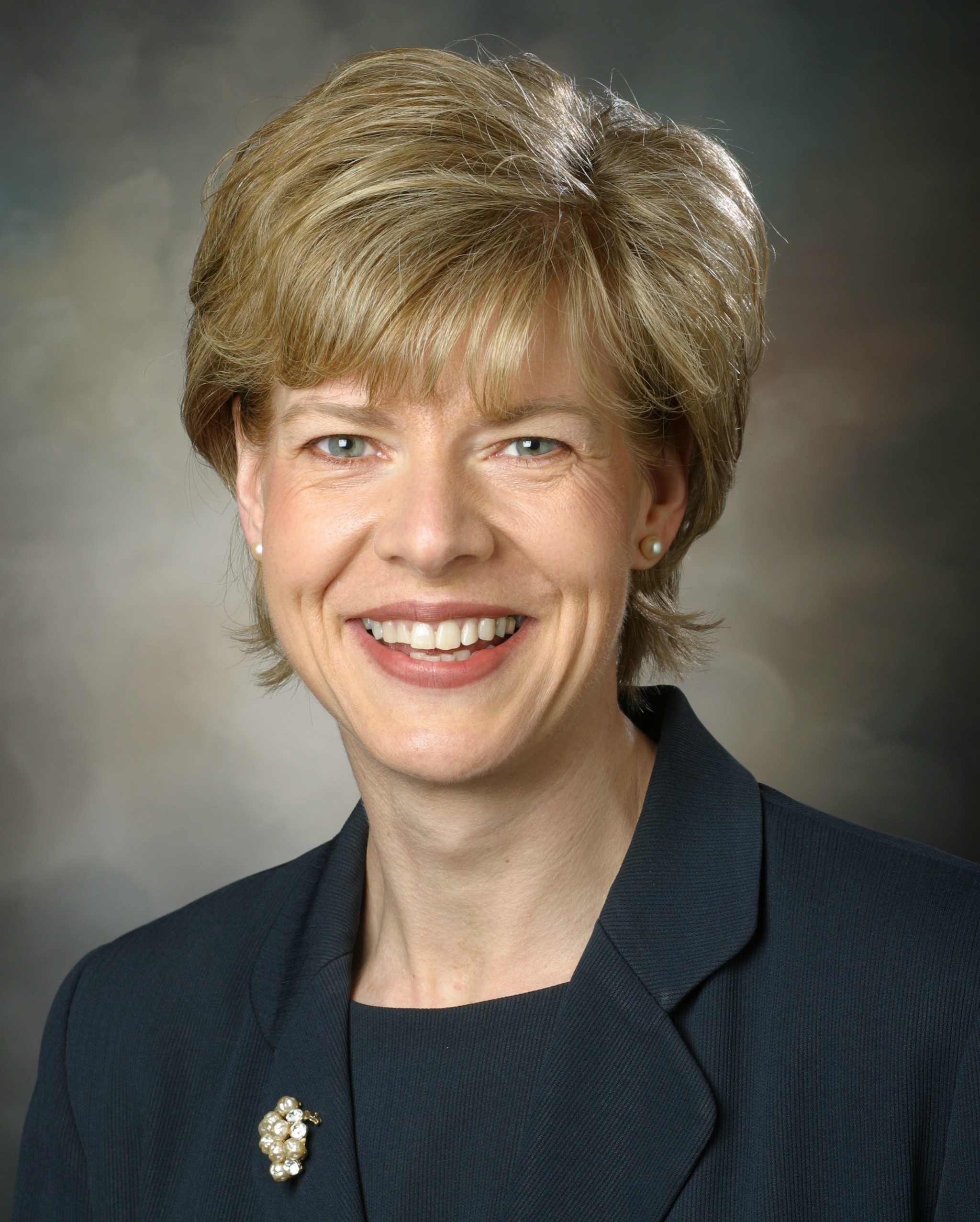

Nominee	Tammy Baldwin	Peter Theron
Party	Democratic	Republican
Popular vote	277,914	122,513
Percentage	69.33%	30.56%
- Precinct results Baldwin: 40–50% 50–60% 60–70% 70–80% 80–90% >90% Theron: 40–50% 50–60% 60–70% 70–80% 80–90% Tie: 50% No votes
U.S. Representative before election
Tammy Baldwin
Democratic
Elected U.S. Representative
Tammy Baldwin
Democratic

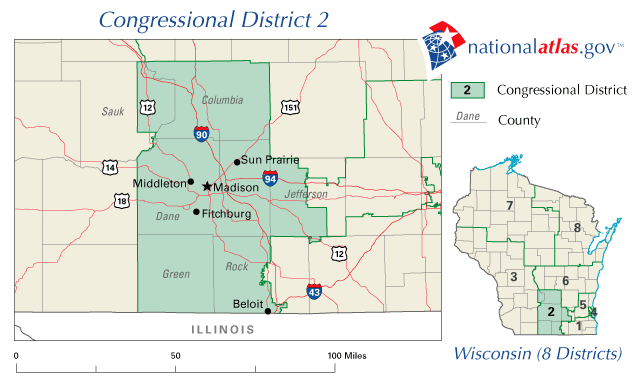

In this very liberal district based in the Madison metropolitan area, incumbent Democratic Congresswoman Tammy Baldwin, the first openly lesbian member of the House, turned away a challenge from Republican candidate Peter Theron and won her sixth term with nearly seventy percent of the vote.

=== Predictions ===
Source	Ranking	As of
The Cook Political Report	Safe D	November 6, 2008
Rothenberg	Safe D	November 2, 2008
Sabato's Crystal Ball	Safe D	November 6, 2008
Real Clear Politics	Safe D	November 7, 2008
CQ Politics	Safe D	November 6, 2008

Wisconsin's 2nd congressional district election, 2008
Party	Candidate	Votes	%
Democratic	Tammy Baldwin (inc.)	277,914	69.33
Republican	Peter Theron	122,513	30.56
Write-ins		414	0.10
Total votes		400,841	100.00
Democratic hold			

== District 3 ==
2008 Wisconsin's 3rd congressional district election
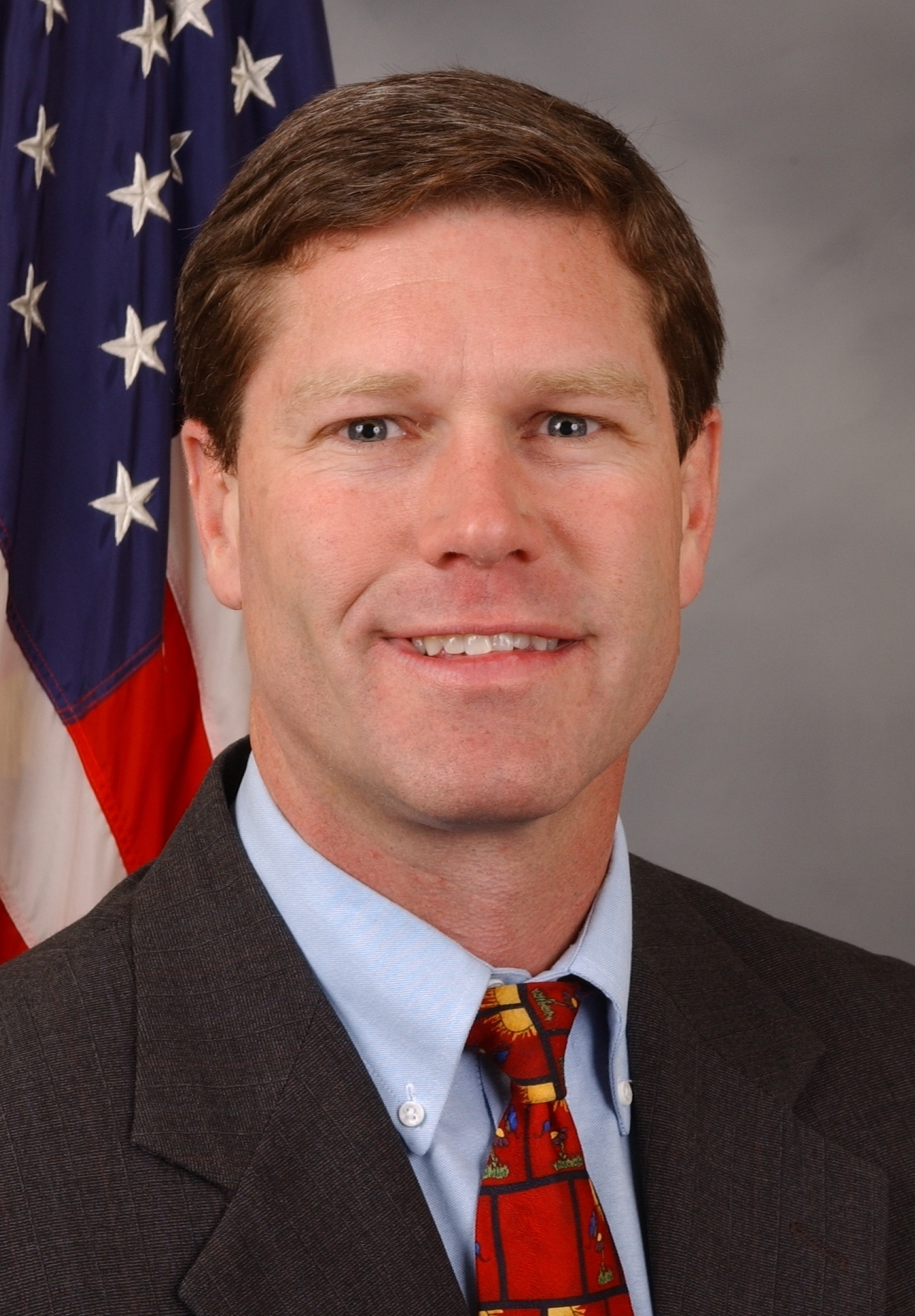

Nominee	Ron Kind	Paul Stark
Party	Democratic	Republican
Popular vote	225,208	122,760
Percentage	63.19%	34.44%
- Kind: 40–50% 50–60% 60–70% 70–80% 80–90% >90% Stark: 40–50% 50–60% 60–70% Tie: 40–50% 50% No votes
U.S. Representative before election
Ron Kind
Democratic
Elected U.S. Representative
Ron Kind
Democratic

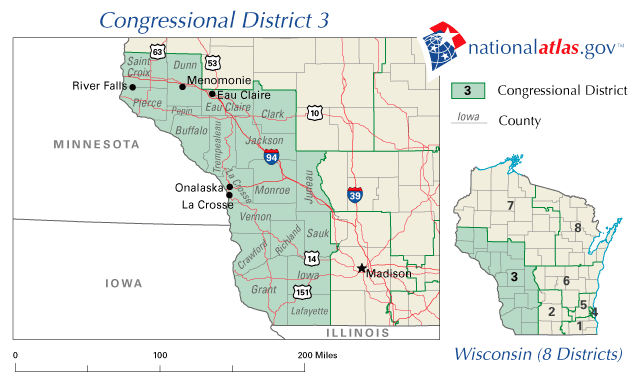

In this relatively liberal district based in western Wisconsin, incumbent Democratic Congressman Ron Kind easily won a seventh term over Republican challenger Paul Stark.

=== Predictions ===
Source	Ranking	As of
The Cook Political Report	Safe D	November 6, 2008
Rothenberg	Safe D	November 2, 2008
Sabato's Crystal Ball	Safe D	November 6, 2008
Real Clear Politics	Safe D	November 7, 2008
CQ Politics	Safe D	November 6, 2008

Wisconsin's 3rd congressional district election, 2008
Party	Candidate	Votes	%
Democratic	Ron Kind (inc.)	225,208	63.19
Republican	Paul Stark	122,760	34.44
Libertarian	Kevin Barrett	8,236	2.31
Write-ins		196	0.05
Total votes		356,400	100.00
Democratic hold			

== District 4 ==
2008 Wisconsin's 4th congressional district election
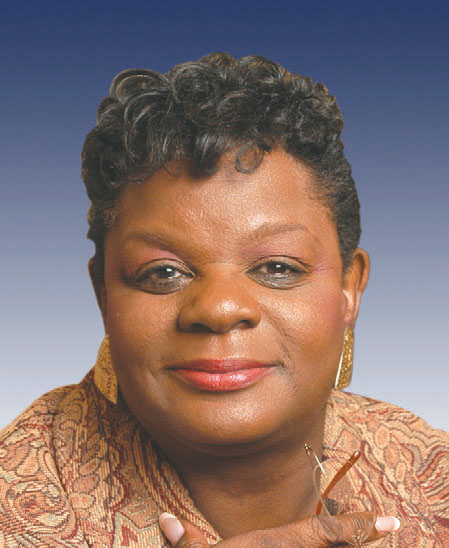

Nominee	Gwen Moore	Michael D. LaForest
Party	Democratic	Independent
Popular vote	222,728	29,282
Percentage	87.63%	11.52%
- Precinct results Moore: 30–40% 60–70% 70–80% 80–90% >90% Tie: 40–50% 50% No votes
U.S. Representative before election
Gwen Moore
Democratic
Elected U.S. Representative
Gwen Moore
Democratic

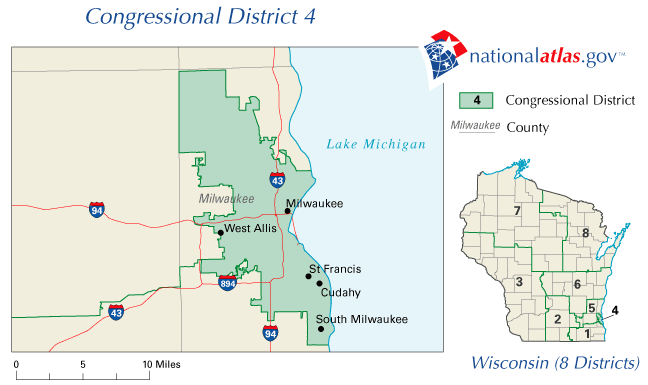

Incumbent Democratic Congresswoman Gwen Moore, running for her third term, faced easy re-election prospects in this highly liberal district based in Milwaukee; no Republican candidate filed to run against her. Moore defeated independent candidate Michael LaForest in a landslide.

=== Predictions ===
Source	Ranking	As of
The Cook Political Report	Safe D	November 6, 2008
Rothenberg	Safe D	November 2, 2008
Sabato's Crystal Ball	Safe D	November 6, 2008
Real Clear Politics	Safe D	November 7, 2008
CQ Politics	Safe D	November 6, 2008

Wisconsin's 4th congressional district election, 2008
Party	Candidate	Votes	%
Democratic	Gwen Moore (inc.)	222,728	87.63
Independent	Michael D. LaForest	29,282	11.52
Write-ins		2,169	0.85
Total votes		254,179	100.00
Democratic hold			

== District 5 ==
2008 Wisconsin's 5th congressional district election
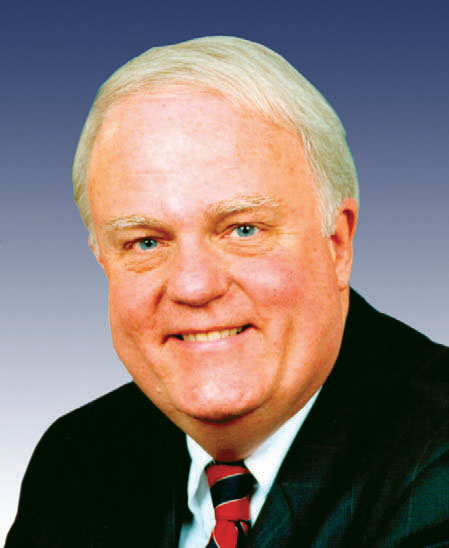

Nominee	Jim Sensenbrenner	Robert R. Raymond
Party	Republican	Independent
Popular vote	275,271	69,715
Percentage	79.58%	20.15%
- Precinct results Sensenbrenner: 40–50% 50–60% 60–70% 70–80% 80–90% >90% Raymond: 40–50% 50–60% Tie: 40–50% No votes
U.S. Representative before election
Jim Sensenbrenner
Republican
Elected U.S. Representative
Jim Sensenbrenner
Republican

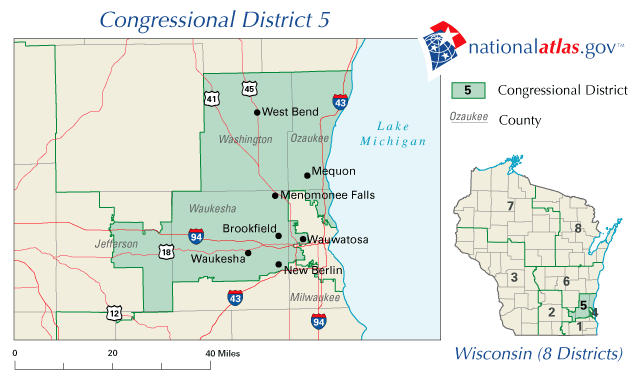

In the wealthiest and most conservative district in Wisconsin, based in the northern suburbs of Milwaukee, long-serving incumbent Republican Congressman Jim Sensenbrenner easily defeated his only challenger, independent candidate Robert R. Raymond, to win a sixteenth term in Congress.

=== Predictions ===
Source	Ranking	As of
The Cook Political Report	Safe R	November 6, 2008
Rothenberg	Safe R	November 2, 2008
Sabato's Crystal Ball	Safe R	November 6, 2008
Real Clear Politics	Safe R	November 7, 2008
CQ Politics	Safe R	November 6, 2008

Wisconsin's 5th congressional district election, 2008
Party	Candidate	Votes	%
Republican	Jim Sensenbrenner (inc.)	275,271	79.58
Independent	Robert R. Raymond	69,715	20.15
Write-ins		913	0.26
Total votes		345,899	100.00
Republican hold			

== District 6 ==
2008 Wisconsin's 6th congressional district election
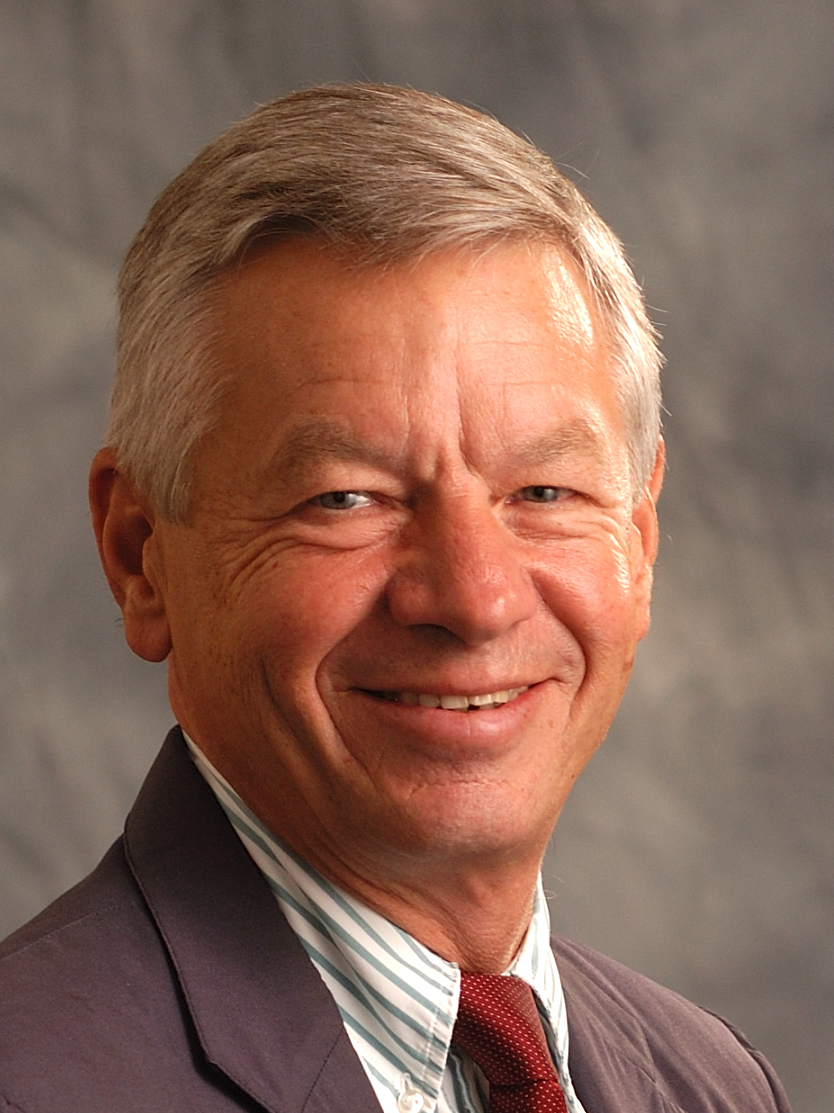

Nominee	Tom Petri	Roger A. Kittelson
Party	Republican	Democratic
Popular vote	221,875	126,090
Percentage	63.71%	36.21%
- Precinct results Petri: 40–50% 50–60% 60–70% 70–80% 80–90% >90% Kittelson: 50–60% 60–70% 70–80% >90% Tie: 50% No votes
U.S. Representative before election
Tom Petri
Republican
Elected U.S. Representative
Tom Petri
Republican

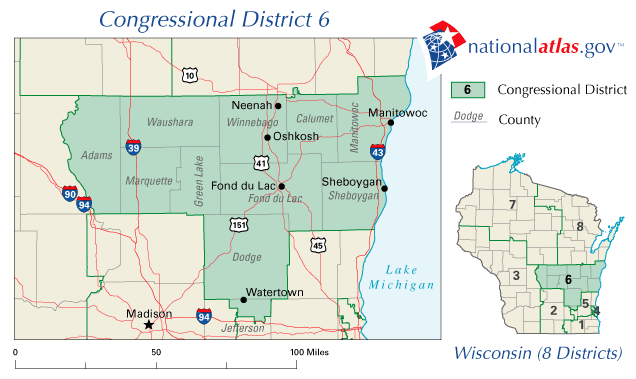

This traditionally conservative district based in the Oshkosh-Neenah, Metropolitan Statistical Area was narrowly won by Democratic nominee Barack Obama in the 2008 election, but long-serving Republican incumbent Congressman Tom Petri held a tight grip on his seat. Petri sought and won a sixteenth term against Democratic candidate Roger Kittelson, winning handily.

=== Predictions ===
Source	Ranking	As of
The Cook Political Report	Safe R	November 6, 2008
Rothenberg	Safe R	November 2, 2008
Sabato's Crystal Ball	Safe R	November 6, 2008
Real Clear Politics	Safe R	November 7, 2008
CQ Politics	Safe R	November 6, 2008

Wisconsin's 6th congressional district election, 2008
Party	Candidate	Votes	%
Republican	Tom Petri (inc.)	221,875	63.71
Democratic	Roger A. Kittelson	126,090	36.21
Write-ins		299	0.09
Total votes		348,264	100.00
Republican hold			

== District 7 ==
2008 Wisconsin's 7th congressional district election
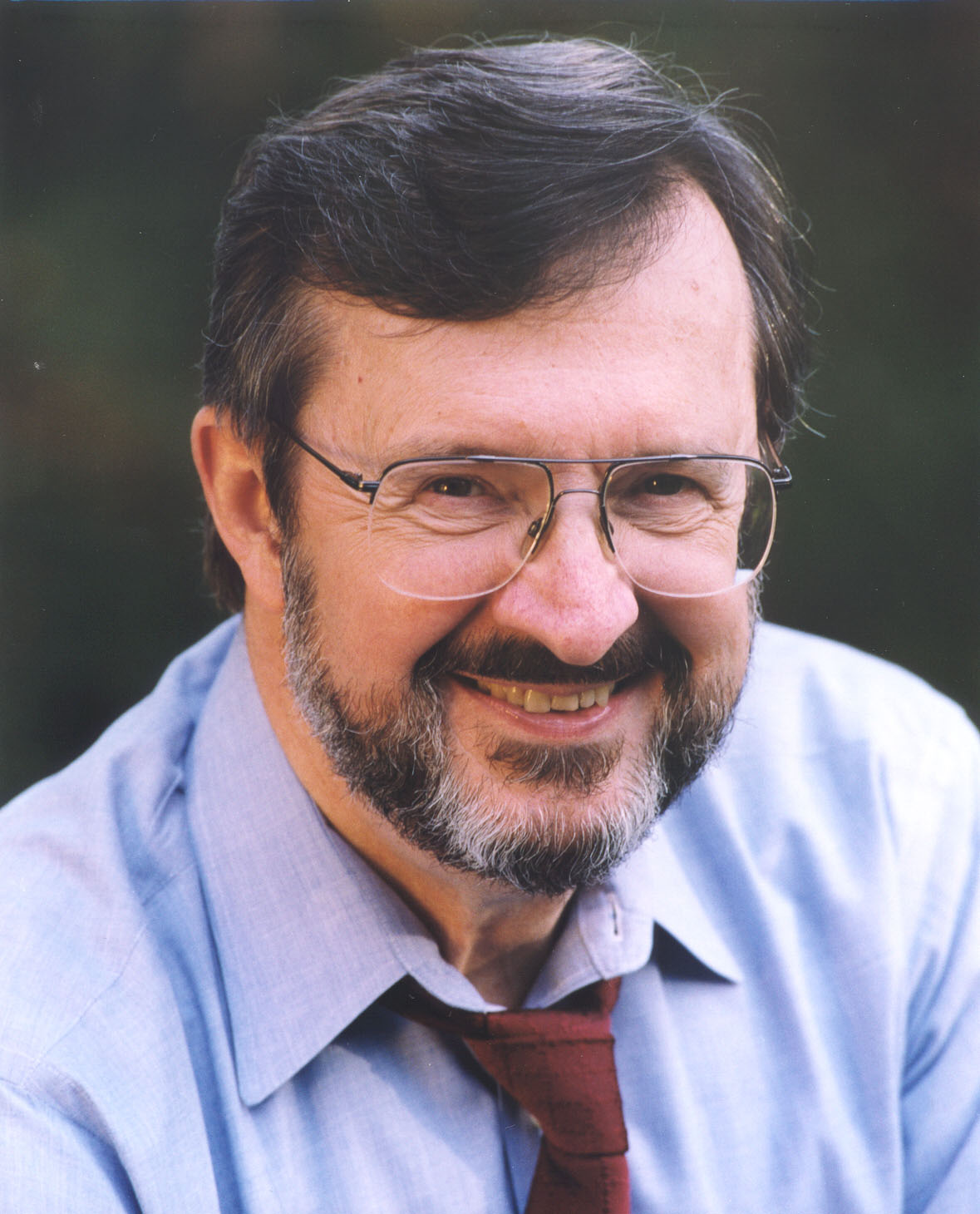

Nominee	Dave Obey	Dan Mielke
Party	Democratic	Republican
Popular vote	212,666	136,938
Percentage	60.79%	39.14%
- Precinct results Obey: 40–50% 50–60% 60–70% 70–80% 80–90% >90% Mielke: 50–60% 60–70% Tie: 40–50% 50% No votes
U.S. Representative before election
Dave Obey
Democratic
Elected U.S. Representative
Dave Obey
Democratic

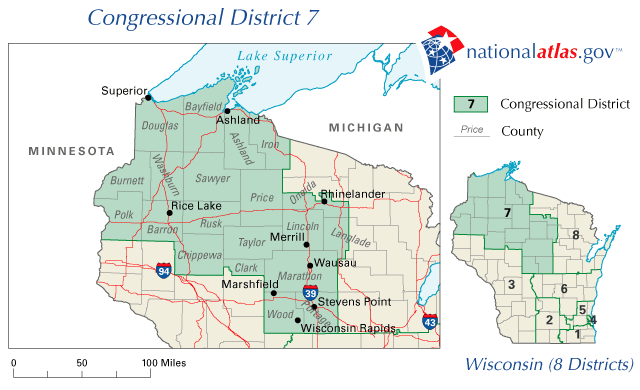

Long-serving incumbent Democratic Congressman Dave Obey held an iron grip on this district based in northwestern Wisconsin for forty years. Seeking a twenty-first term in Congress, Obey was overwhelmingly re-elected again over Republican challenger Dan Mielke despite the centrist nature of the district.

=== Predictions ===
Source	Ranking	As of
The Cook Political Report	Safe D	November 6, 2008
Rothenberg	Safe D	November 2, 2008
Sabato's Crystal Ball	Safe D	November 6, 2008
Real Clear Politics	Safe D	November 7, 2008
CQ Politics	Safe D	November 6, 2008

Wisconsin's 7th congressional district election, 2008
Party	Candidate	Votes	%
Democratic	Dave Obey (inc.)	212,666	60.79
Republican	Dan Mielke	136,938	39.14
Write-ins		233	0.07
Total votes		349,837	100.00
Democratic hold			

== District 8 ==
2008 Wisconsin's 8th congressional district election
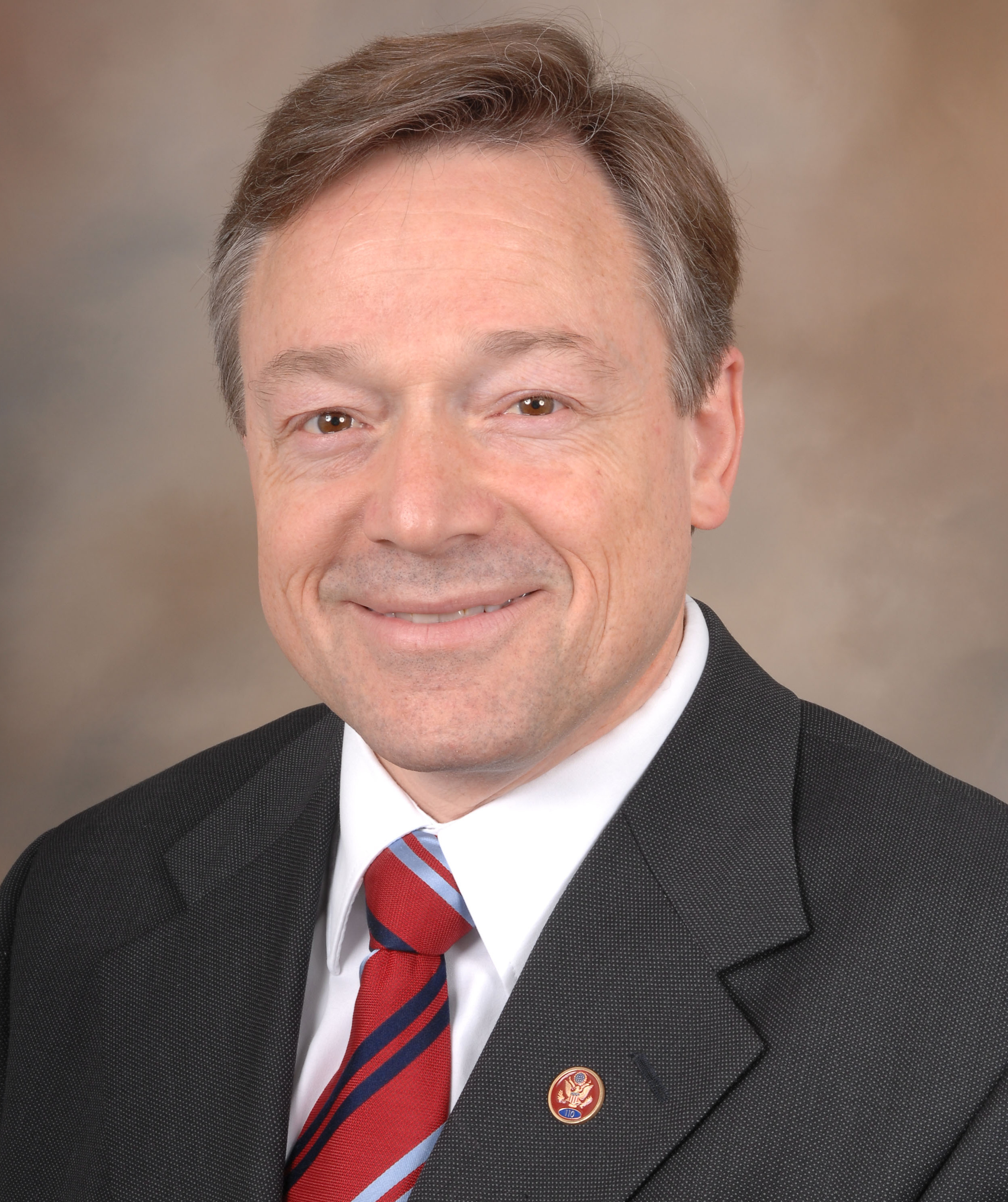

Nominee	Steve Kagen	John Gard
Party	Democratic	Republican
Popular vote	193,662	164,621
Percentage	54.00%	45.90%
- Precinct results Kagen: 50–60% 60–70% 70–80% 80–90% >90% Gard: 40–50% 50–60% 60–70% 70–80% 80–90% Tie: 40–50% 50% No votes
U.S. Representative before election
Steve Kagen
Democratic
Elected U.S. Representative
Steve Kagen
Democratic

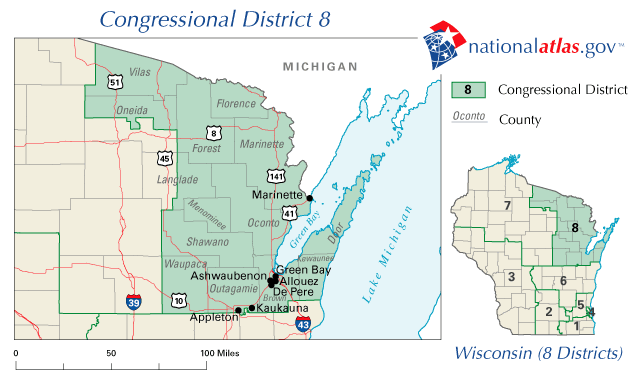

Incumbent Congressman Steve Kagen faced off against former Wisconsin State Assembly Speaker John Gard for a second time in this Republican-leaning district that is based in northeastern Wisconsin and that includes the cities of Green Bay and Appleton. Seeking a second term, Kagen defeated Gard by a larger margin than he did in 2006, allowing him to keep this swing district under Democratic control.

=== Predictions ===
Source	Ranking	As of
The Cook Political Report	Lean D	November 6, 2008
Rothenberg	Likely D	November 2, 2008
Sabato's Crystal Ball	Lean D	November 6, 2008
Real Clear Politics	Tossup	November 7, 2008
CQ Politics	Lean D	November 6, 2008

Wisconsin's 8th congressional district election, 2008
Party	Candidate	Votes	%
Democratic	Steve Kagen (inc.)	193,662	54.00
Republican	John Gard	164,621	45.90
Write-ins		364	0.10
Total votes		358,647	100.00
Democratic hold			

Preceded by 2006 elections	United States House elections in Wisconsin; 2008	Succeeded by 2010 elections
