= 2006 United States House of Representatives elections in Wisconsin =

- November 7, 2006

All 8 Wisconsin seats to the United States House of Representatives
	Majority party	Minority party
Party	Democratic	Republican
Last election	4	4
Seats won	5	3
Seat change	▲1	▼1
Popular vote	1,003,156	1,040,071
Percentage	48.62%	50.41%
Swing	▼0.32%	▲1.91%

Democratic
50–60%
60–70%
70–80%
80–90%
Republican
50–60%
60–70%
80–90%
90–100%

The 2006 congressional elections in Wisconsin were held on November 7, 2006, to determine who would represent the state of Wisconsin in the United States House of Representatives. Representatives were elected for two-year terms; those elected served in the 110th Congress from January 3, 2007, until January 3, 2009. The election coincided with the 2006 U.S. senatorial election and the 2006 Wisconsin gubernatorial election.

Wisconsin had eight seats in the House, apportioned according to the 2000 United States census. Its 2006-2007 congressional delegation consisted of four Democrats and four Republicans. That changed after the 2006 congressional elections in Wisconsin when the open 8th congressional district formerly held by Republican Mark Green, was won by Democratic Representative Steve Kagen.

Wisconsin was one of seven states in which the party that won the state's popular vote did not win a majority of seats in 2006, the other states being Indiana, Nevada, Michigan, Ohio, Iowa, and New Mexico.

== Overview ==
United States House of Representatives elections in Wisconsin, 2006
Party	Votes	Percentage	Seats	+/–
Republican	1,040,071	50.41%	3	-1
Democratic	1,003,156	48.62%	5	+1
Independents	20,186	0.98%	0	—
Totals	2,063,413	100.00%	8	—

== District 1 ==
2006 Wisconsin's 1st congressional district election
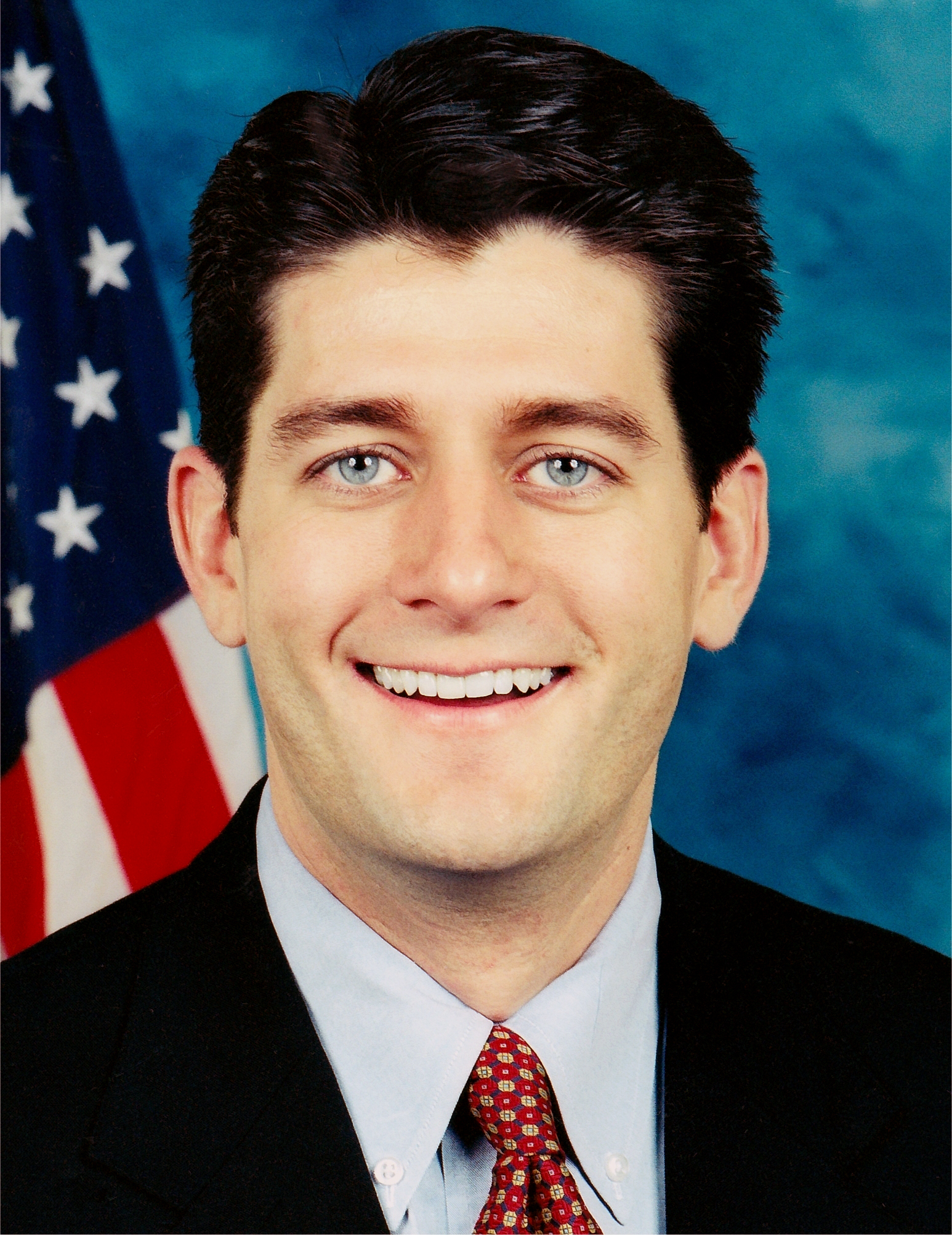

Nominee	Paul Ryan	Jeffrey C. Thomas
Party	Republican	Democratic
Popular vote	161,320	95,761
Percentage	62.63%	37.17%
- Precinct results Ryan: 40–50% 50–60% 60–70% 70–80% >90% Thomas: 40–50% 50–60% 60–70% 70–80% 80–90% Tie: 50% No votes
U.S. Representative before election
Paul Ryan
Republican
Elected U.S. Representative
Paul Ryan
Republican

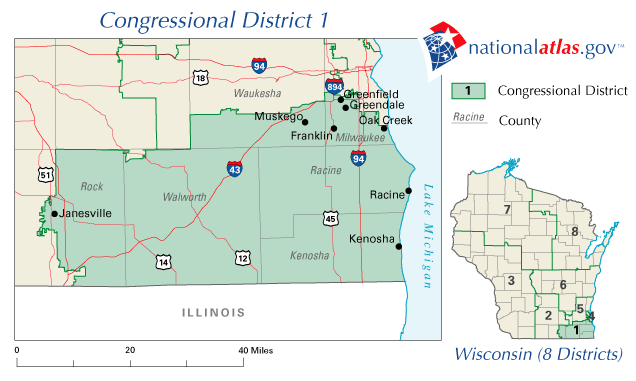

Incumbent Republican Congressman Paul Ryan has represented this swing district in southeast Wisconsin since his initial election in 1998. Though this district only barely went to President George W. Bush in 2004, defeating Congressman Ryan was not a priority for the Democratic Party, and the Democratic nominee was former Janesville City Councilman and perennial candidate Jeff Thomas, whom Ryan was able to handily beat, even in an unfavorable election year for Republicans.

=== Predictions ===
Source	Ranking	As of
The Cook Political Report	Safe R	November 6, 2006
Rothenberg	Safe R	November 6, 2006
Sabato's Crystal Ball	Safe R	November 6, 2006
Real Clear Politics	Safe R	November 7, 2006
CQ Politics	Safe R	November 7, 2006

Wisconsin's 1st congressional district election, 2006
Party	Candidate	Votes	%
Republican	Paul Ryan (inc.)	161,320	62.63
Democratic	Jeffrey C. Thomas	95,761	37.17
Write-ins		515	0.20
Total votes		257,596	100.00
Republican hold			

== District 2 ==
2006 Wisconsin's 2nd congressional district election
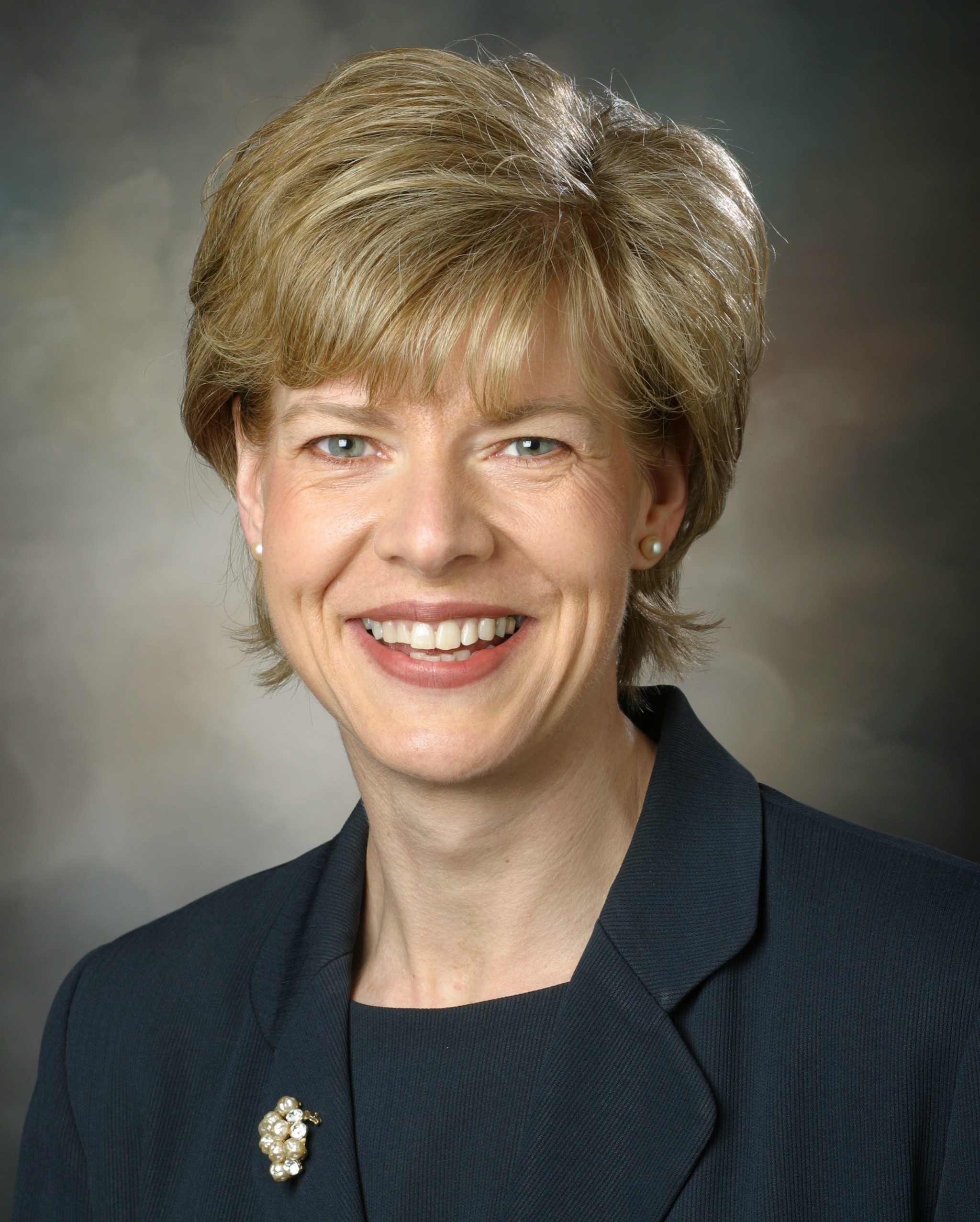

Nominee	Tammy Baldwin	Dave Magnum
Party	Democratic	Republican
Popular vote	191,420	113,015
Percentage	62.82%	37.09%
- Precinct results Baldwin: 40–50% 50–60% 60–70% 70–80% 80–90% >90% Magnum: 50–60% 60–70% 70–80% 80–90% >90% Tie: 50% No votes
U.S. Representative before election
Tammy Baldwin
Democratic
Elected U.S. Representative
Tammy Baldwin
Democratic

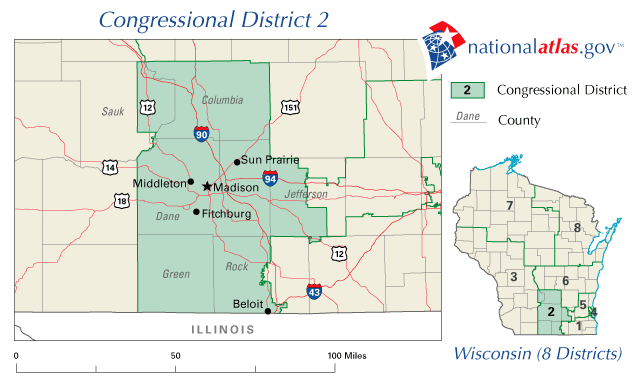

Incumbent Democratic Congresswoman Tammy Baldwin, the only openly lesbian member of Congress, has represented this deep-blue district located in Madison and vicinity since 1999. This year, Baldwin was able to win a fifth term in a rematch from 2004 against Republican candidate Dave Magnum.

=== Endorsements ===
Tammy Baldwin

Individuals

- Wesley Clark General, 2004 democratic, presidential candidate

==== Predictions ====
Source	Ranking	As of
The Cook Political Report	Safe D	November 6, 2006
Rothenberg	Safe D	November 6, 2006
Sabato's Crystal Ball	Safe D	November 6, 2006
Real Clear Politics	Safe D	November 7, 2006
CQ Politics	Safe D	November 7, 2006

Wisconsin's 2nd congressional district election, 2006
Party	Candidate	Votes	%
Democratic	Tammy Baldwin (inc.)	191,420	62.82
Republican	Dave Magnum	113,015	37.09
Write-ins		259	0.20
Total votes		304,688	100.00
Democratic hold			

== District 3 ==
2006 Wisconsin's 3rd congressional district election
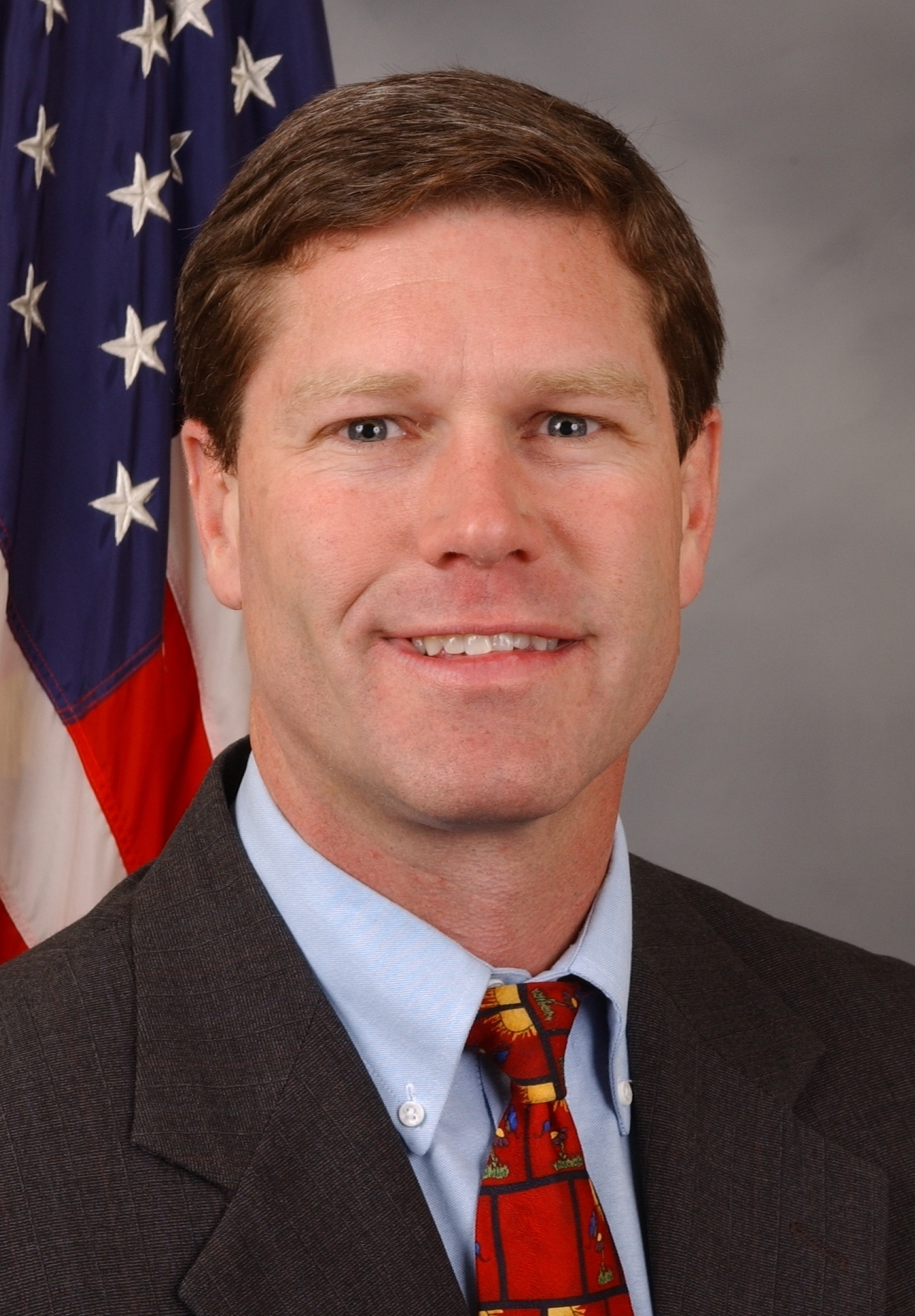

Nominee	Ron Kind	Paul R. Nelson
Party	Democratic	Republican
Popular vote	163,322	88,523
Percentage	64.9%	35.1%
- Kind: 40–50% 50–60% 60–70% 70–80% 80–90% >90% Nelson: 50–60% 60–70% 80–90% >90% Tie: 50% No votes
U.S. Representative before election
Ron Kind
Democratic
Elected U.S. Representative
Ron Kind
Democratic

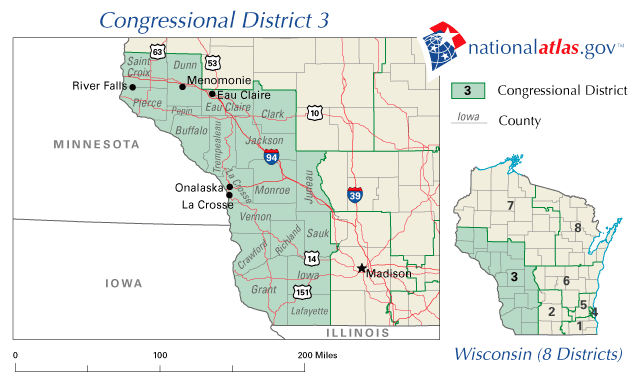

Democratic Congressman Ron Kind has represented this western Wisconsin-based district since he was first elected in 1996 and sought a sixth term this year against Republican nominee Paul Nelson. Congressman Kind was successful and won another term in Congress.

=== Predictions ===
Source	Ranking	As of
The Cook Political Report	Safe D	November 6, 2006
Rothenberg	Safe D	November 6, 2006
Sabato's Crystal Ball	Safe D	November 6, 2006
Real Clear Politics	Safe D	November 7, 2006
CQ Politics	Safe D	November 7, 2006

Wisconsin's 3rd congressional district election, 2006
Party	Candidate	Votes	%
Democratic	Ron Kind (inc.)	163,322	64.79
Republican	Paul R. Nelson	88,523	35.12
Write-ins		242	0.10
Total votes		252,087	100.00
Democratic hold			

== District 4 ==
2006 Wisconsin's 4th congressional district election
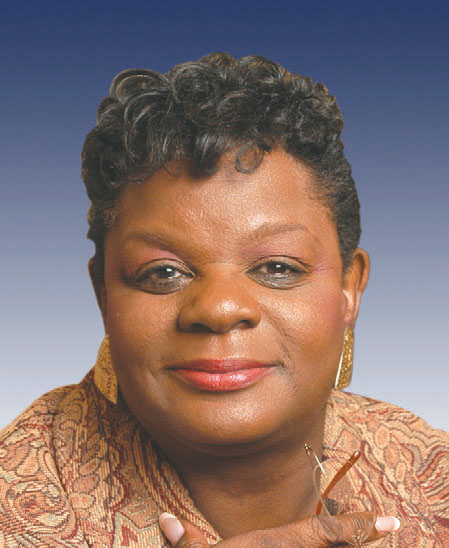

Nominee	Gwen Moore	Perfecto Rivera
Party	Democratic	Republican
Popular vote	136,735	54,486
Percentage	71.31%	28.42%
- Precinct results Moore: 40–50% 50–60% 60–70% 70–80% 80–90% >90% Rivera: 40–50% 50–60% 60–70% Tie: 50% No votes
U.S. Representative before election
Gwen Moore
Democratic
Elected U.S. Representative
Gwen Moore
Democratic

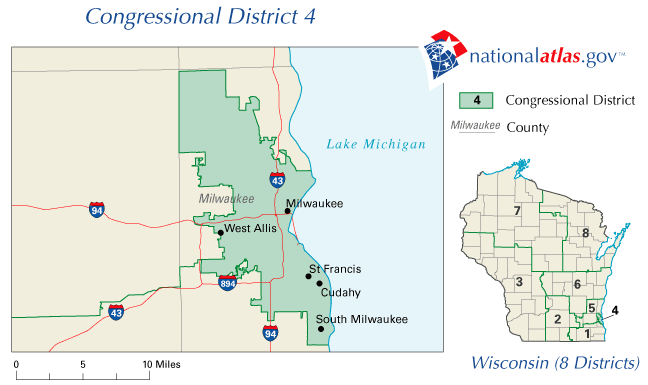

Freshman Democratic Congresswoman Gwen Moore ran for a second term in this district based in the city of Milwaukee. Congresswoman Moore faced Republican candidate Perfecto Rivera, whom she was easily able to dispatch with to return to Washington for another term.

=== Predictions ===
Source	Ranking	As of
The Cook Political Report	Safe D	November 6, 2006
Rothenberg	Safe D	November 6, 2006
Sabato's Crystal Ball	Safe D	November 6, 2006
Real Clear Politics	Safe D	November 7, 2006
CQ Politics	Safe D	November 7, 2006

Wisconsin's 4th congressional district election, 2006
Party	Candidate	Votes	%
Democratic	Gwen Moore (inc.)	136,735	71.31
Republican	Perfecto Rivera	54,486	28.42
Write-ins		521	0.27
Total votes		191,742	100.00
Democratic hold			

== District 5 ==
2006 Wisconsin's 5th congressional district election
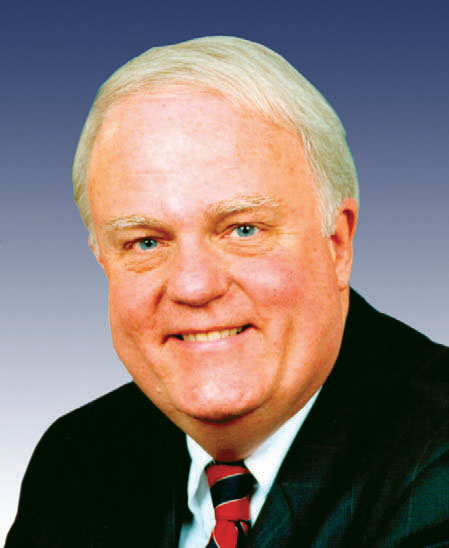

Nominee	Jim Sensenbrenner	Bryan Kennedy
Party	Republican	Democratic
Popular vote	194,669	112,451
Percentage	61.76%	35.68%
- Precinct results Sensenbrenner: 40–50% 50–60% 60–70% 70–80% 80–90% >90% Kennedy: 40–50% 50–60% 60–70% 70–80% 80–90% >90% Tie: 40–50% No votes
U.S. Representative before election
Jim Sensenbrenner
Republican
Elected U.S. Representative
Jim Sensenbrenner
Republican

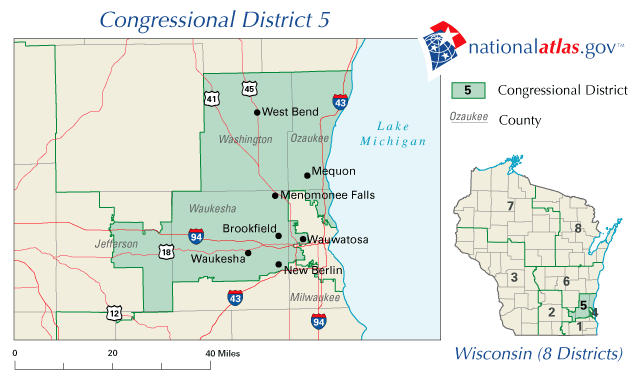

Incumbent Republican Congressman Jim Sensenbrenner, who has represented this solidly conservative district based in the northern suburbs of Milwaukee since 1979, ran for a fifteenth term this year. Congressman Sensenbrenner faced Democratic candidate Bryan Kennedy, who was able to perform surprisingly well in this district, though he ultimately fell to Sensenbrenner in the general election.

=== Predictions ===
Source	Ranking	As of
The Cook Political Report	Safe R	November 6, 2006
Rothenberg	Safe R	November 6, 2006
Sabato's Crystal Ball	Safe R	November 6, 2006
Real Clear Politics	Safe R	November 7, 2006
CQ Politics	Safe R	November 7, 2006

Wisconsin's 5th congressional district election, 2006
Party	Candidate	Votes	%
Republican	Jim Sensenbrenner (inc.)	194,669	61.76
Democratic	Bryan Kennedy	112,451	35.68
Green	Bob Levis	4,432	1.41
Independent	Robert R. Raymond	3,525	1.12
Write-ins		103	0.03
Total votes		315,180	100.00
Republican hold			

== District 6 ==
2006 Wisconsin's 6th congressional district election
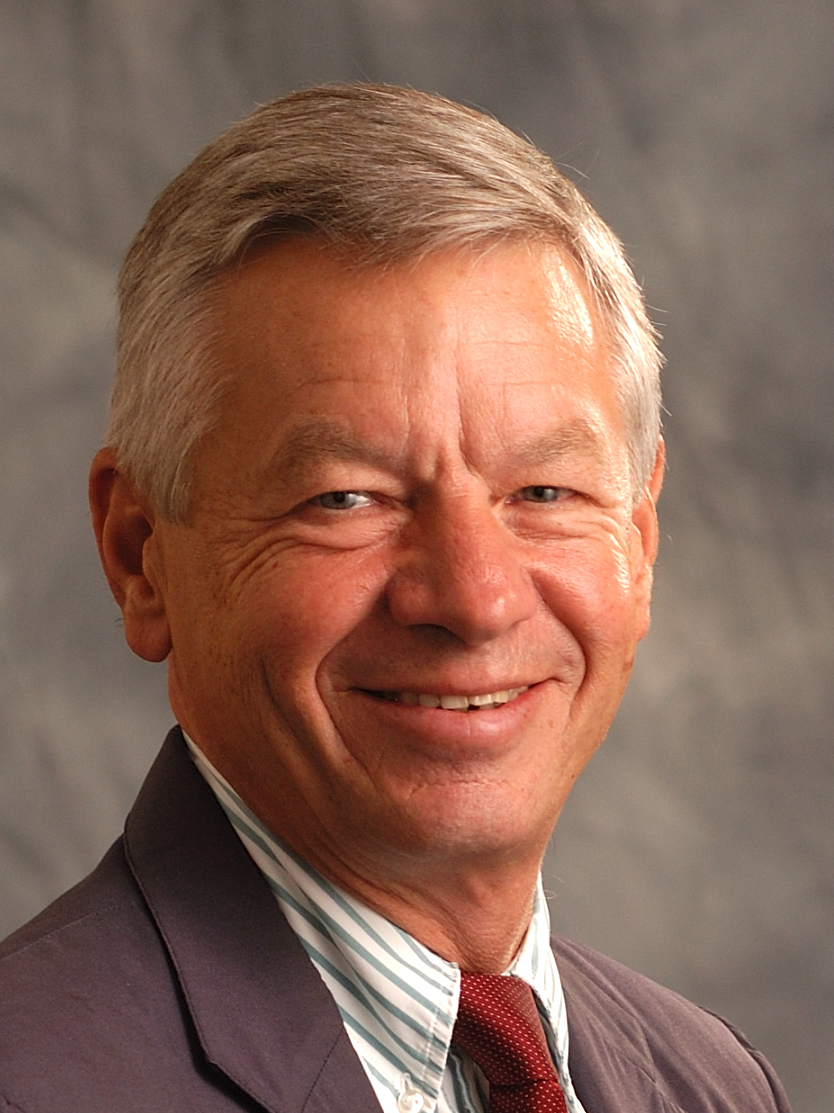
Nominee	Tom Petri
Party	Republican
Popular vote	201,367
Percentage	98.9%
U.S. Representative before election
Tom Petri (inc.)
Republican
Elected U.S. Representative
Tom Petri
Republican

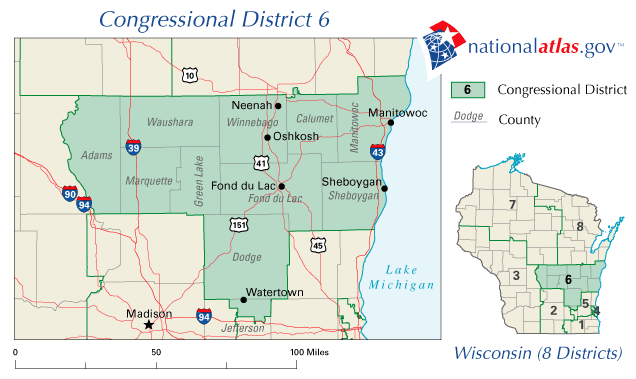

Facing no major-party opposition, incumbent Republican Congressman Tom Petri was easily able to retain his seat for a fourteenth term in this heavily conservative district located in the cities of Oshkosh and Neenah.

=== Predictions ===
Source	Ranking	As of
The Cook Political Report	Safe R	November 6, 2006
Rothenberg	Safe R	November 6, 2006
Sabato's Crystal Ball	Safe R	November 6, 2006
Real Clear Politics	Safe R	November 7, 2006
CQ Politics	Safe R	November 7, 2006

Wisconsin's 6th congressional district election, 2006
Party	Candidate	Votes	%
Republican	Tom Petri (inc.)	201,367	98.92
Write-ins		2,190	1.08
Total votes		203,557	100.00
Republican hold			

== District 7 ==
2006 Wisconsin's 7th congressional district election
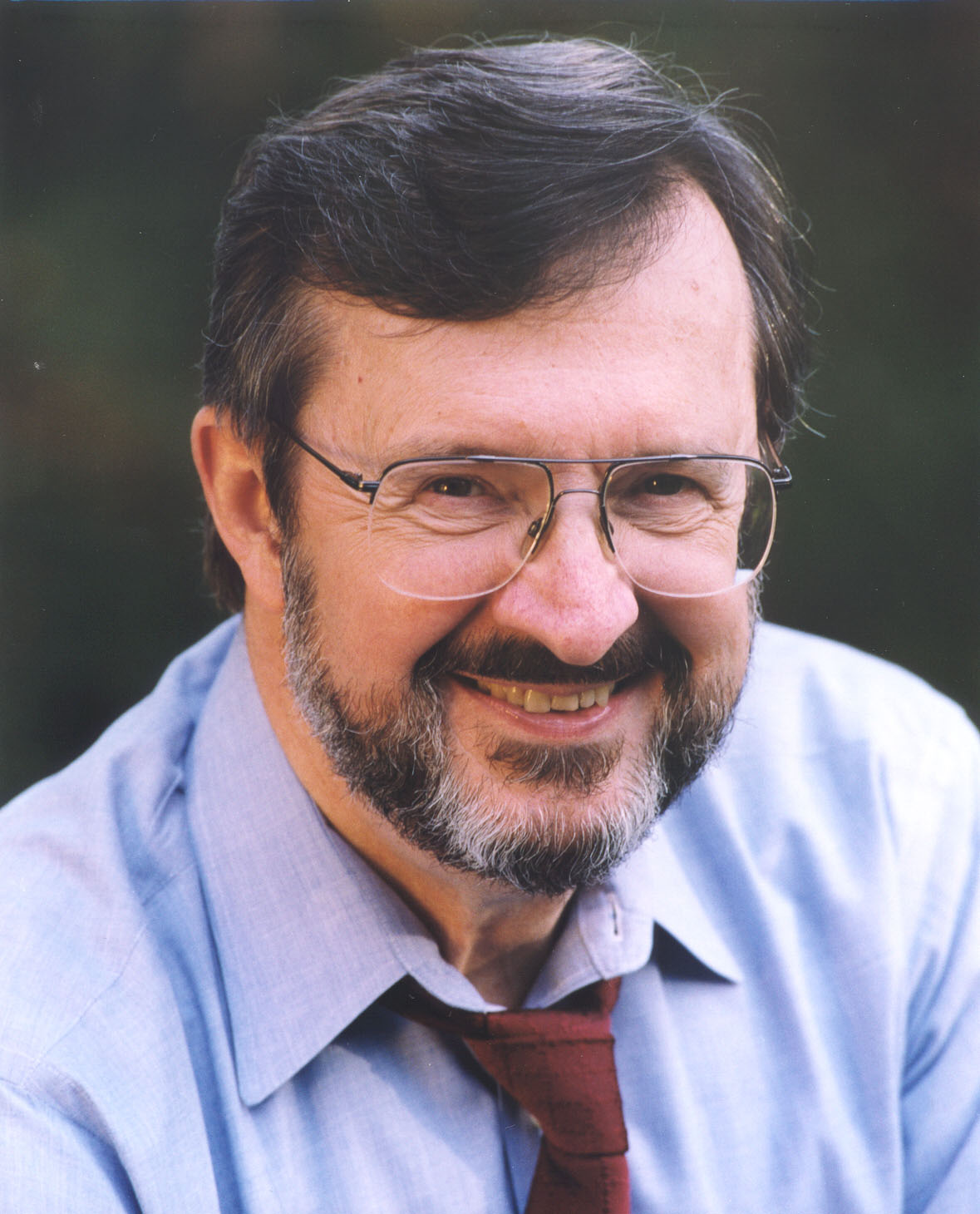

Nominee	Dave Obey	Nick Reid
Party	Democratic	Republican
Popular vote	161,903	91,069
Percentage	62.17%	34.97%
- Obey: 40–50% 50–60% 60–70% 70–80% 80–90% >90% Reid: 40–50% 50–60% 60–70% 70–80% 80–90% >90% Tie: 40–50% 50% No votes
U.S. Representative before election
Dave Obey
Democratic
Elected U.S. Representative
Dave Obey
Democratic

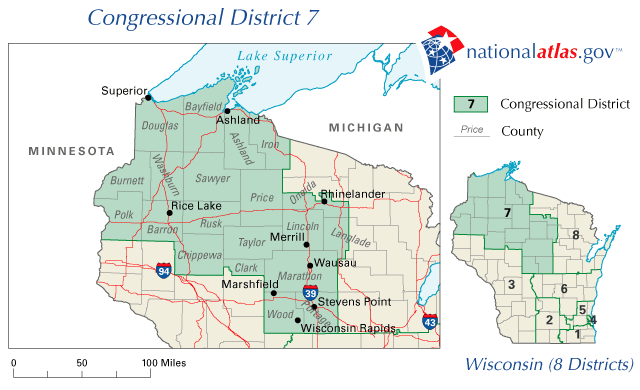

Long-serving Democratic Congressman Dave Obey, a high-ranking member on the House Appropriations Committee and the dean of Wisconsin's congressional delegation, ran for a twentieth term in Congress against Republican candidate Nick Reid and Green Party candidate Mike Miles. Obey has represented northwest Wisconsin for decades, and retained his seat by a large margin.

=== Predictions ===
Source	Ranking	As of
The Cook Political Report	Safe D	November 6, 2006
Rothenberg	Safe D	November 6, 2006
Sabato's Crystal Ball	Safe D	November 6, 2006
Real Clear Politics	Safe D	November 7, 2006
CQ Politics	Safe D	November 7, 2006

Wisconsin's 7th congressional district election, 2006
Party	Candidate	Votes	%
Democratic	Dave Obey (inc.)	161,903	62.17
Republican	Nick Reid	91,069	34.97
Green	Mike Miles	7,391	2.84
Write-ins		65	0.02
Total votes		260,428	100.00
Democratic hold			

== District 8 ==
2006 Wisconsin's 8th congressional district election
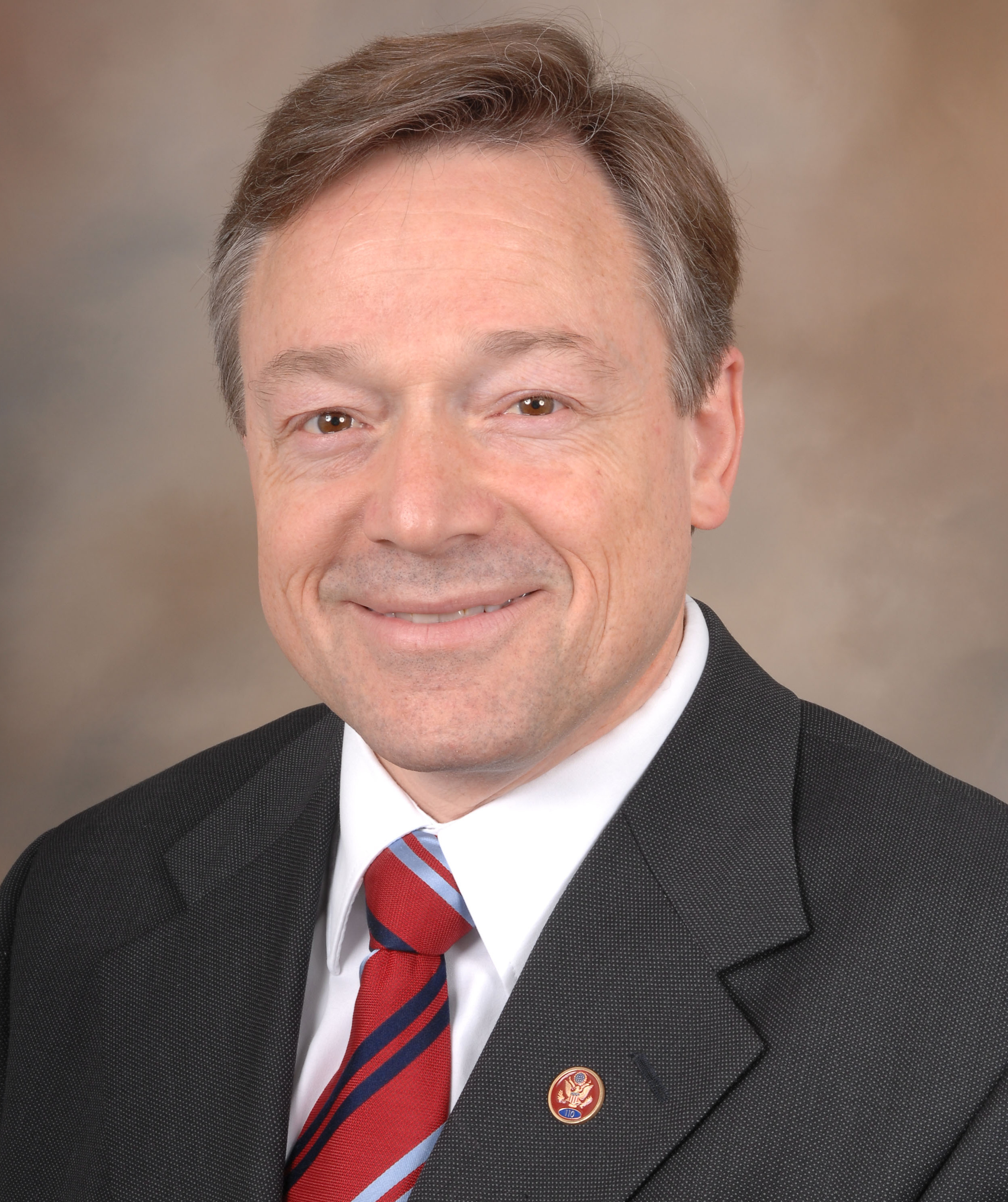

Nominee	Steve Kagen	John Gard
Party	Democratic	Republican
Popular vote	141,570	135,622
Percentage	50.9%	48.8%
- Kagen: 40–50% 50–60% 60–70% 70–80% 80–90% >90% Gard: 40–50% 50–60% 60–70% 70–80% 80–90% >90% Tie: 40–50% 50% No votes
U.S. Representative before election
Mark Green
Republican
Elected U.S. Representative
Steve Kagen
Democratic

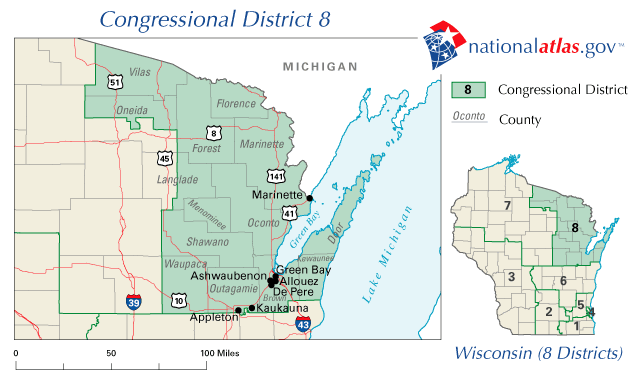

When incumbent Republican Congressman Mark Green declined to seek a fifth term, instead opting to run for Governor, an open seat was created. Physician Steve Kagen defeated business consultant Jamie Wall and former Brown County Executive Nancy Nusbaum in the Democratic primary, while the Speaker of the State Assembly John Gard defeated fellow State Representative Terri McCormick in the Republican primary. Gard and Kagen duked it out in this marginally conservative district, with the election becoming the most expensive congressional election in Wisconsin state history. Ultimately, Kagen was able to take advantage of the Democratic wave sweeping the country and defeated Gard to seize the seat for the Democrats.

=== Endorsements ===
Steve Kagen (D)

Individuals

- Wesley Clark, General, 2004 democratic presidential candidate

==== Predictions ====
Source	Ranking	As of
The Cook Political Report	Tossup	November 6, 2006
Rothenberg	Tossup	November 6, 2006
Sabato's Crystal Ball	Tilt R	November 6, 2006
Real Clear Politics	Lean R	November 7, 2006
CQ Politics	Tossup	November 7, 2006

Wisconsin's 8th congressional district election, 2006
Party	Candidate	Votes	%
Democratic	Steve Kagen	141,570	50.90
Republican	John Gard	135,622	48.76
Write-ins		943	0.34
Total votes		278,135	100.00
Democratic gain from Republican			

Preceded by 2004 elections	United States House elections in Wisconsin; 2006	Succeeded by 2008 elections
