= Ron Kind =

American politician and lawyer (born 1963)

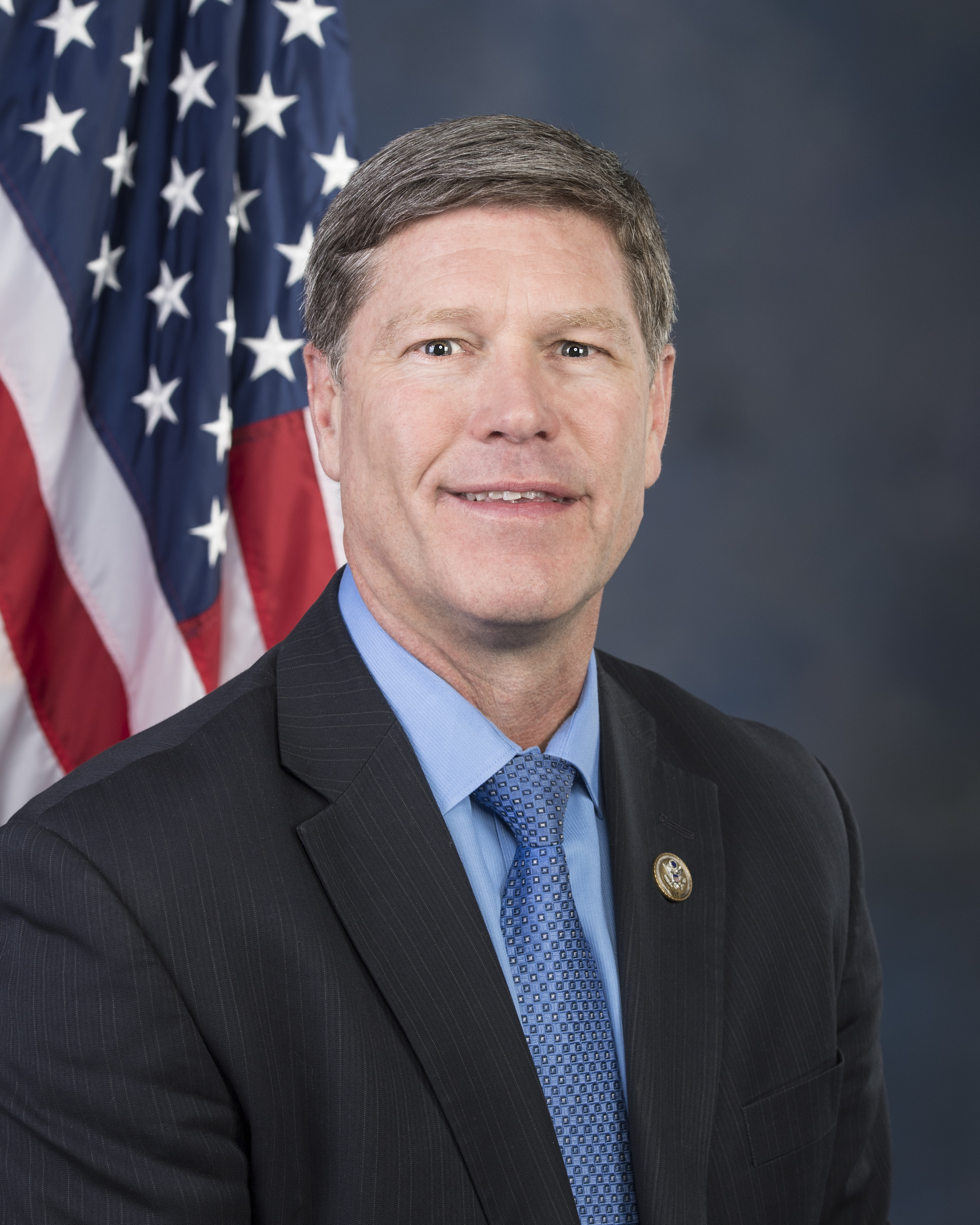

Chair of the New Democrat Coalition
- In office January 3, 2013 – January 3, 2017
- Preceded by: Joe Crowley
- Succeeded by: Jim Himes
- In office January 3, 2001 – January 3, 2005
- Preceded by: Cal Dooley; Jim Moran; Tim Roemer
- Succeeded by: Ellen Tauscher

Member of the U.S. House of Representatives from Wisconsin's 3rd district
- In office January 3, 1997 – January 3, 2023
- Preceded by: Steve Gunderson
- Succeeded by: Derrick Van Orden

Personal details
- Born: Ronald James Kind; March 16, 1963 (age 63) La Crosse, Wisconsin, U.S.
- Party: Democratic
- Spouse: Tawni Zappa (m. 1994)
- Children: 2
- Education: Harvard University (BA); London School of Economics (MA); University of Minnesota (JD)
- Kind's voice Kind honoring deceased former U.S. Rep. Ellen Tauscher; Recorded May 14, 2019

Ronald James Kind (born March 16, 1963) is an American lawyer and politician who served as the U.S. representative for Wisconsin's 3rd congressional district from 1997 to 2023. He is a member of the Democratic Party. His former district is in western Wisconsin, anchored by La Crosse, Eau Claire, Platteville, Stevens Point, Wisconsin Rapids, Prescott, and River Falls. Kind was the dean of Wisconsin's congressional delegation when he chose not to seek re-election in 2022.

== Early life, education, and career ==
Kind was born and raised in La Crosse, the third of five children born to Greta and Elroy Kind. His is the fifth generation of his family to live in the area. Kind's mother formerly worked as the assistant director of personnel in the La Crosse School District. His father had a 35-year career as a telephone repairman and union leader at the La Crosse Telephone Company.

Kind attended La Crosse schools and was a student athlete at Logan High School in both football and basketball. He accepted a scholarship to Harvard College and graduated with honors in 1985. At Harvard, Kind played quarterback on the football team and worked during the summer for Wisconsin Senator William Proxmire in Washington. While working for Proxmire, he took part in investigations that helped determine the "winners" of the Golden Fleece Awards, presented by Proxmire to those responsible for government waste.

Kind received a master's degree from the London School of Economics and a J.D. degree from the University of Minnesota Law School. He practiced law for two years at Quarles and Brady, a law firm in Milwaukee.

Kind returned to La Crosse to become an assistant district attorney. He later served as a state special prosecutor in several western Wisconsin counties.

== U.S. House of Representatives ==
=== Elections ===
While campaigning for an eighth term in Congress in 1994, Republican Representative Steve Gunderson announced that it would be his last. Kind, then an assistant district attorney in La Crosse, moved quickly to set up a campaign operation. In April 1995, he took a leave of absence from the district attorney's office and by June he boasted an extensive campaign operation across the district. In September 1995, Kind announced his candidacy. A yearlong, five-way Democratic primary contest ensued; Kind won the September 1996 primary election with 46% of the vote. In the general election, he faced Republican James Harsdorf, a former Wisconsin state senator. At the time of the 1996 election, only two Democrats had represented Wisconsin's 3rd congressional district during the 20th century and only one in the last 88 years; the election was hotly contested with national political figures appearing in support of both candidates. Kind's campaign attacked Harsdorf for his stated support for polarizing national Republican leaders such as Newt Gingrich and Dick Armey, and used it to link him to unpopular Republican policies such as cutting Medicare; Harsdorf bashed Kind as "another lawyer running for Congress." Kind defeated Harsdorf with 52% of the vote. He didn't face another contest nearly that close until 2010.

==== 2006 ====
In 2006, Kind faced a surprise primary challenge from La Crosse activist Charles "Chip" DeNure, who ran unsuccessfully for mayor in 2001 and had flirted with several other mayoral campaigns. He challenged Kind over the Iraq War, with DeNure declaring his support for a timetable to withdraw American forces. DeNure also claimed the September 11 attacks were "an inside job by terrorists within the U.S. government." Kind won 83% of the primary vote and went on to defeat Republican Paul R. Nelson with 65% of the vote in the general election.

==== 2010 ====
In late 2009, Kind considered running for governor of Wisconsin in 2010 but ultimately said that instead he would push in Congress for health care reform. Of his decision to run for reelection, Kind said: "My first responsibility must be to get affordable and accessible health care reform passed this year for all Wisconsin families. That is why I cannot run for governor. I have a responsibility and duty to the people of Wisconsin to continue work on the health care reform agenda ahead of us." The Milwaukee Journal Sentinel reported that he had given up on running for governor "after a poll showed that few Wisconsinites knew him."

Amid the difficult and controversial passage of the Affordable Care Act and the Tea Party protests of 2009 and 2010, Wisconsin media described Kind as facing "what is widely considered his toughest re-election challenge." His Republican opponent, state senator Dan Kapanke, who represented much of the central portion of the district, "focused almost exclusively on three core Republican issues—less spending, lower taxes, and smaller government." Kapanke also criticized Kind for allegedly soliciting thousands of dollars in 2007 from a group of Eau Claire doctors. Despite a national Republican wave, which also saw Republicans win every statewide office in Wisconsin, Kind survived the challenge from Kapanke with just over 50% of the vote.

==== 2012 ====
There was talk that Kind might run for the U.S. Senate in 2012 to replace the retiring Herb Kohl, but he decided not to mount a primary challenge to fellow U.S. Representative Tammy Baldwin, who had already announced her candidacy. There was also a push to draft Kind to run for governor against Scott Walker in the 2012 gubernatorial recall election.

Kind ultimately decided to run for reelection to Congress. He faced retired U.S. Army Colonel Ray Boland in the November election and won with 64% of the vote.

==== 2016 ====
In 2016, seeking his 11th term in Congress, Kind faced a primary challenge from Eau Claire teacher Myron Buchholz. Buchholz was an outspoken supporter of U.S. Senator Bernie Sanders, who had been defeated in the 2016 Democratic Party presidential primaries but had carried Kind's congressional district in the Wisconsin presidential primary. Kind said, "I think that people have gotten to know me. I will not apologize for trying to find common ground in divided government", and defended his support for the Trans-Pacific Partnership, an issue that was polarizing working-class voters. Kind defeated Buchholz, 81% to 19%, in the primary, and faced no Republican challenger in the general election.

==== 2018 ====
In April 2017, The Hill reported that Kind was a "prime target" for Republicans in the 2018 elections. The article cited a number of concerns for Kind, including that President Donald Trump had carried his district in the 2016 presidential election. The Cook Political Report also cited Kind's district as the 25th most Republican-trending district held by a Democrat. Kind was also facing criticism over the fact that a veteran who had died after taking an off-label mixture of pills prescribed to him by the Tomah VA had previously contacted Kind's congressional office.

Kind also faced a potential primary challenge in 2018 from LGBTQ advocate Juliet Germanotta, who described herself as transgender, HIV positive, and a democratic socialist, but in February 2018, she was charged on an outstanding warrant in New York City for the theft of a $4,800 ring. Germanotta ultimately failed to gather enough signatures to appear on the primary ballot, and Kind avoided a primary.

Despite Republican hopes for the district, Kind was easily reelected, defeating Republican Steve Toft with 59% of the vote.

=== Tenure ===
Kind was the House Democrats' Chief Deputy Whip under Steny Hoyer. He was co-founder of both the Upper Mississippi River Congressional Caucus and the Congressional Wildlife Refuge Caucus, and chair of the New Democrat Coalition. He voted with his party 87% of the time in the 112th Congress and 94% of the time in the 111th Congress. During the 114th Congress Kind was ranked the 19th most bipartisan member of the U.S. House of Representatives and the most bipartisan member of the House from Wisconsin in the Bipartisan Index created by The Lugar Center and the McCourt School of Public Policy. The index ranks members of Congress by bipartisanship by measuring how often their bills attract co-sponsors from the opposite party and how often they co-sponsor bills by members of the opposite party.

After the failed effort to unseat Governor Scott Walker in a June 2012 recall election, Kind said that Democrats should be proud of forcing recall elections despite the outcome. He said that his conversations with voters had convinced him that the only reason that Democrats lost was that people didn't think it was a proper use of the recall process.

Kind opposed Nancy Pelosi's bids for Speaker of the House in both 2006 and 2018. After winning control of the House in 2006, Pelosi asked Kind to resign from his position as Chief Deputy Whip. In 2018, as Democrats were again poised to win a majority, he again noted his opposition, saying to The Hill: "I've been consistent in saying we're in desperate need of new leadership on both sides, as we move forward in the new Congress." Kind followed through on his election pledge to oppose Pelosi and voted instead for Congressman John Lewis in the election for Speaker in 2019.

On December 18, 2019, Kind voted for both articles of impeachment against President Trump.

==== Agricultural issues ====
Representing some of the country's most productive dairy farms, Kind has for many years supported reforms to U.S. agricultural subsidy programs. In 2007, he upset Democratic House leaders by co-sponsoring—with Republican congressman Jeff Flake—a bill that would have eliminated subsidies for those earning over $250,000 while increasing funding for conservation and rural development. At the time, the bill split the Democratic caucus, which had previously agreed to a similar bill which set the cutoff at $1,000,000—in order to placate rural farm-state Democrats. Pelosi, who had worked to make the original bill accommodating for those rural Democratic interests, was upset with Kind's proposal. Agricultural Committee Chairman Collin Peterson said Kind was "a lone ranger on this, and he's dividing the caucus, and I don't appreciate it." Kind's proposal was ultimately referred to committee and never voted on.

==== Childhood obesity ====
Kind and Colorado Senator Mark Udall introduced the Healthy Kids Outdoors Act, aimed at encouraging and supporting children's outdoor activities. He has been the House sponsor of the FIT Kids Act for the last several House sessions. The act would require school districts to report on students' physical activity and to give youngsters health and nutritional information.

In 2011, Kind wrote a piece about "the childhood obesity epidemic", in which he promoted both the FIT Kids Act and the Healthy Kids Outdoors Act. He said that healthy bodies lead to healthy minds, and that his FIT Kids Act would push parents and the public by requiring states and school districts to report on children's physical activity. As for the Healthy Kids Outdoors Act, it "provides state-level incentives to develop five-year state strategies to connect children, youth and families with nature and promote outdoor recreation in communities."

==== Environment ====
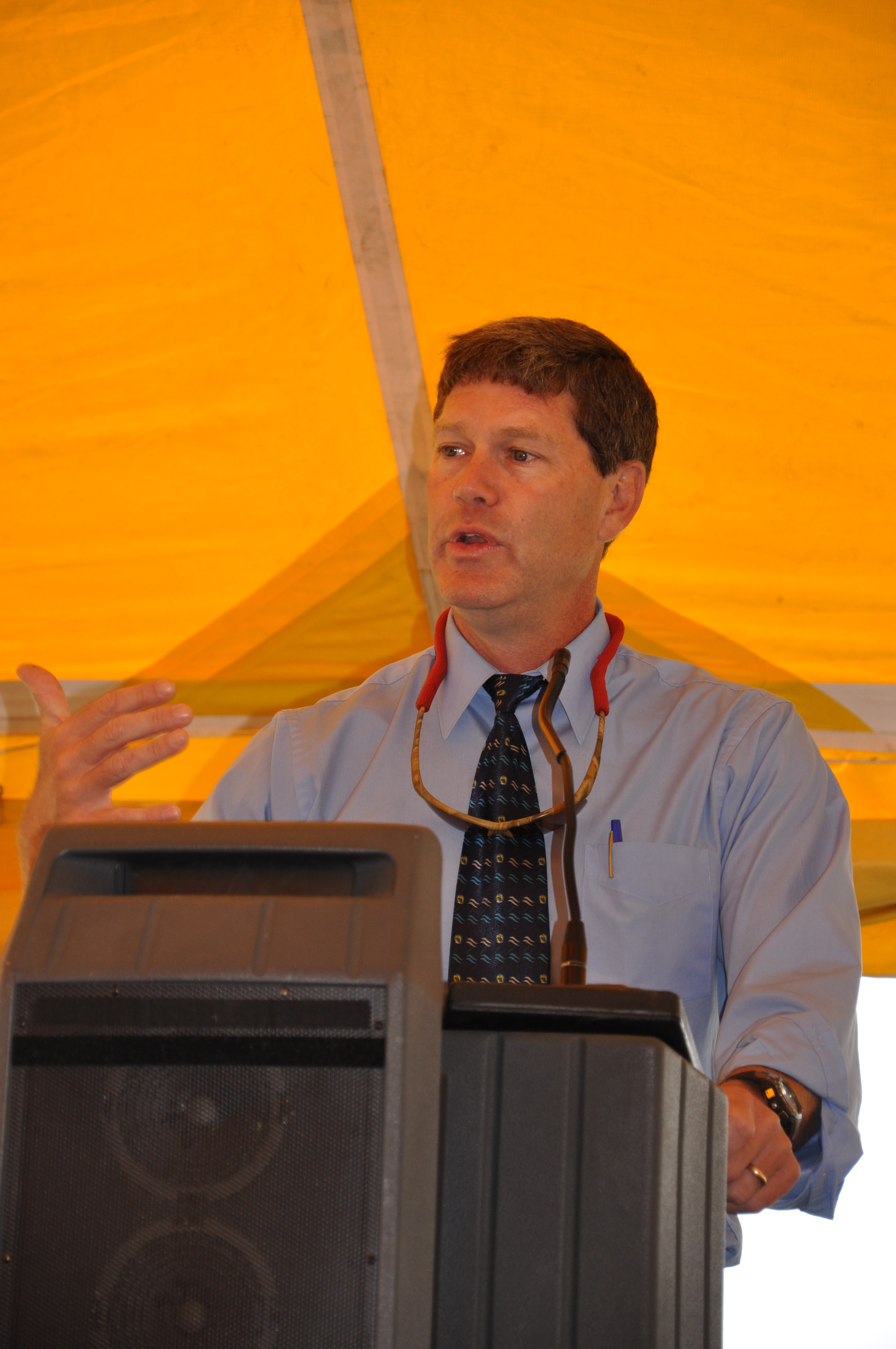
Kind speaks at U.S. Fish and Wildlife Service opening ceremony

In October 2017, Kind announced a plan to protect the Mississippi River. It involved "four main parts: creating jobs by supporting recreation, tourism and navigation; maintaining railroad safety; supporting the Mississippi River Restoration Program; and promoting the 'Conservation on the Farm' bill".

==== Gun control ====
During his 2012 campaign, Kind opposed any form of enhanced gun control, but after the Sandy Hook Elementary School shooting he seemed to be open to it, saying, "We're going to have to have a discussion while also keeping in mind the concerns of law-abiding, safety-conscious gun owners in America." He added, "I just don't see where armed guards or teachers with guns in our schools means freedom for our children."

WIZM reported in February 2018 that Kind was one of a relatively small number of Democrats who had received contributions from the National Rifle Association of America. Since 2009, he had accepted $7,950 in from various NRA political action committees. He had also collected $5,400 from the Connecticut-based National Shooting Sports Foundation, which calls itself "The Firearms Industry Trade Association." The NRA endorsed Kind in 2010.

Kind was one of two Democrats to vote against HR 1446: Enhanced Background Checks Act of 2021, designed to close the so-called Charleston loophole. Earlier he had voted in favor of HR 8: Bipartisan Background Checks Act of 2021 to expand background checks on gun purchases. Both bills passed the House on March 11, 2021.

In June 2022, Kind was the only Democrat to vote against a measure establishing AMBER Alert-like systems for active shooter events. He again voted against the measure when it came up the following month and was again the only Democrat to do so. In a statement, Kind said he is "concerned that a system like this could generate more chaos and cause armed civilians to rush to the scene, potentially interfering with law enforcement efforts."

On July 29, 2022, Kind and four other Democrats joined the Republicans in voting against a bill banning assault weapons.

==== Health care ====
Kind supported and voted for the Affordable Care Act, denying at a public event that insurers were canceling insurance. Rather, they were signing customers up "with new plans that are compliant with ACA." He insisted that under five percent of the population would lose their insurance under Obamacare and that most would "get a much better deal in the healthcare exchange—good price and much better benefits than what they were paying before." He added that young people are "probably going to get a real good deal" under Obamacare.

Kind voted against the 2017 Republican health care bill. "I thought it was a bad piece of legislation," he said, "both in the process of how it came together and the impact it will have for people back home."

==== Immigration ====
In October 2014, Kind said he supported "comprehensive immigration reform that secures our borders, helps our farmers and businesses meet their labor needs, and fairly addresses the millions of undocumented individuals in the shadows." On October 20, 2017, Kind spoke up in defense of DACA, saying that Dreamers "are as American as anyone else's children."

When then-presidential candidate Donald Trump called in 2015 for temporarily banning all Muslims from entering the United States, Kind said Trump was "playing in the same huddle as ISIS” and was making ISIS recruiting easier by playing into the terrorist group's narrative.

In January 2017, Kind issued a statement in which he maintained that "President Trump's Executive Order blocking refugees and people from select Muslim countries from entering the United States does not reflect who we are as a nation. We cannot start discriminating based on religion. Instead of helping keep our country safe it will jeopardize our national security by giving ISIS and other terror groups another recruitment tool and making it harder for our allies in Muslim nations to work with us on counter-terrorism operations."

==== Marijuana legalization ====
Kind has evolved on the issue of marijuana legalization. While running for reelection in 2014, he indicated his support for medical marijuana, but opposed "the full legalization of recreational marijuana." He also said, "Colorado and Washington State have taken the lead to decriminalize marijuana. We should watch those experiments closely before deciding to legalize recreational marijuana nationally." When the House of Representatives considered a stand-alone bill for the legalization of marijuana in December 2020, Kind voted in favor.

==== Taxation and retirement ====
In 2017, Kind rejected the Tax Cuts and Jobs Act of 2017 as a rehash of failed trickle-down economics policies. He indicated he personally supported tax reform to simplify the tax code, but accused Republicans of blowing up the deficit in their rush to cut taxes for their corporate allies, saying the Republican plan would lead to future cuts to Medicare and Social Security and would not invigorate the economy.

Kind was an early co-sponsor of the bipartisan SECURE Act of 2019, which contained a number of provisions to expand access to retirement planning options and to encourage employers to set up retirement plans for workers. The bill, originally introduced in late March 2019, was enacted in December 2019 as part of the fiscal year 2020 federal appropriations bill.

==== Trade ====
Kind was the lone Wisconsin Democrat to support free trade with China, despite pressure from unions that claimed trade with China is costing jobs.

The La Crosse Tribune reported in January 2014 that Kind was coming "under increasing criticism from those on the left who say his support of new free-trade agreements will kill jobs." For example, he urged fellow House members to vote for the Trans-Pacific Partnership—a comprehensive agreement with 11 other Pacific nations. At the Democratic National Convention, protesters criticized Kind for his support of the Trans-Pacific Partnership trade deal. "There's confusion; people are conflating trade with trade agreements", Kind insisted. "The trade that's going on absent trade agreements has not worked well for us: China, Brazil, India. We don't have trade agreements with those countries." Ultimately, at Trump's direction, the U.S. withdrew from consideration of the TPP, and the remaining members consolidated the agreement into the Comprehensive and Progressive Agreement for Trans-Pacific Partnership, which came into force in 2018, forming one of the largest trading blocs globally.

==== Veterans issues ====
Kind announced in May 2014 that he would ask for the establishment of an independent bipartisan commission to investigate conditions at VA hospitals.

==== War on Terrorism ====
On October 10, 2002, Kind voted for the Authorization to use military force against Iraq. He later expressed regret for that vote, saying in 2008, "It was the wrong war at the wrong time for the wrong reason", and in 2016, "My great regret is that if you look at the Iraq resolution that we had to vote on, there were multiple steps that had to be taken before the use of force. My great regret is realizing now that President Bush wasn't interested in those steps. He ordered the troops in when it wasn't a last resort."

In a January 2007 letter to President Bush, Kind and a dozen-odd other members of Congress wrote that success in Iraq "requires regional cooperation and positive engagement from all neighboring states. The history of the Middle East is too vast, too complex and too tumultuous to expect progress without an integrated diplomatic effort and multinational support from all of Iraq's neighbors. History is replete with centuries of marked violence and failed crusades, perpetrated by ignorance, arrogance and dogma."

In September 2014, Kind said that he opposed "sending any military combat troops in order to deal with ISIS," but expressed support for President Obama's "decisions to use targeted airstrikes in Syria and Iraq to degrade and destroy ISIS, and to send service members to assist Iraqi and Kurdish forces with training and intelligence."

=== Committee assignments ===
- Committee on Ways and Means
  - Subcommittee on Health
  - Subcommittee on Trade

=== Caucus memberships ===
- Congressional Wildlife Refuge Caucus
- United States Congressional International Conservation Caucus
- Sportsmen's Caucus
- Upper Mississippi River Congressional Caucus
- Congressional Arts Caucus
- Congressional United Kingdom Caucus
- New Democrat Coalition
- Congressional NextGen 9-1-1 Caucus
- Climate Solutions Caucus

== Retirement ==
Kind announced on August 10, 2021, that he would not seek re-election in 2022. Having won the 2020 general election by only about three percentage points, compared to a 20-point win in 2018, and facing a rematch with his 2020 Republican opponent (and ultimate successor) Derrick Van Orden, Kind told reporters, "I've run out of gas."

== Personal life ==
Kind and his wife, Tawni, live in La Crosse. She is an official court reporter for the County Court system. They have two sons.

Kind is a member of the La Crosse Optimists Club, a leader in the Boys and Girls Club, and the La Crosse YMCA. He is also on the board of directors for Coulee Council on Alcohol or Other Drug Abuse.

On February 6, 2023, Kind joined the law firm Arnold & Porter as a senior policy advisor.

Kind was appointed an Honorary Officer of the Order of the British Empire (OBE) in the 2023 Special Honours for services to UK/US relations.

== Controversies ==
=== Rangel ethics probe ===
In October 2009, The Hill profiled Kind, focusing on his challenge to "the Democratic status quo." While calling him "an influential voice on...ethics," The Hill also noted that Kind had refused to join in the effort that year to have Ways and Means Chairman Charles Rangel step down amid an ethics probe involving Rangel's taxes. "We're all ultimately human and none of us are perfect and we're all prone to mistakes from time to time", Kind said. "If that becomes that new standard--that any mistake is subject to dismissal or losing their position--then that's going to be a very tough standard for each and every member to have to live up to."

=== Pay-for-talk controversy ===
In October 2010, two doctors at the OakLeaf Surgical Hospital in Eau Claire charged that Kind had demanded campaign donations before meeting them to discuss the Children's Health and Medical Protection Act. Kind denied the accusation. One of the accusers, a surgeon who requested anonymity, asserted in a sworn statement that a Kind aide explained that he "typically requires a contribution of $10,000 for a one to two-hour personal meeting and $25,000 for a half-day meeting."

== Electoral history ==
=== U.S. House (1996–2020) ===
Year	Election	Date	Elected				Defeated				Total	Plurality
1996	Primary	Sep. 10	Ron Kind	Democratic	13,685	46.01%	Lee Rasch	Dem.	8,582	28.86%	29,741	5,103
1996	Primary	Sep. 10	Ron Kind	Democratic	13,685	46.01%	Tim Bakken	Dem.	5,370	18.06%	29,741	5,103
1996	Primary	Sep. 10	Ron Kind	Democratic	13,685	46.01%	Mark Weinhold	Dem.	1,108	3.73%	29,741	5,103
1996	Primary	Sep. 10	Ron Kind	Democratic	13,685	46.01%	Joe Monahan	Dem.	996	3.35%	29,741	5,103
1996	General	Nov. 5	Ron Kind	Democratic	121,967	52.10%	James E. Harsdorf	Rep.	112,146	47.90%	234,113	9,821
1998	General	Nov. 3	Ron Kind (inc)	Democratic	128,256	71.55%	Tony A. Brechler	Rep.	51,001	28.45%	179,257	77,255
2000	General	Nov. 7	Ron Kind (inc)	Democratic	173,505	63.74%	Susan Tully	Rep.	97,741	35.91%	271,246	75,764
2002	General	Nov. 5	Ron Kind (inc)	Democratic	131,038	62.82%	Bill Arndt	Rep.	69,955	33.54%	208,581	61,083
2002	General	Nov. 5	Ron Kind (inc)	Democratic	131,038	62.82%	Jeff Zastrow	Lib.	6,674	3.20%	208,581	61,083
2004	General	Nov. 2	Ron Kind (inc)	Democratic	204,856	56.43%	Dale W. Schultz	Rep.	157,866	43.49%	363,008	46,990
2006	Primary	Sep. 12	Ron Kind (inc)	Democratic	39,765	83.66%	Chip De Nure	Dem.	7,744	16.29%	47,529	32,021
2006	General	Nov. 7	Ron Kind (inc)	Democratic	163,322	64.79%	Paul R. Nelson	Rep.	88,523	35.12%	252,087	74,799
2008	General	Nov. 4	Ron Kind (inc)	Democratic	225,208	63.19%	Paul Stark	Rep.	122,760	34.44%	356,400	102,448
2008	General	Nov. 4	Ron Kind (inc)	Democratic	225,208	63.19%	Kevin Barrett	Lib.	8,236	2.31%	356,400	102,448
2010	General	Nov. 2	Ron Kind (inc)	Democratic	126,380	50.28%	Dan Kapanke	Rep.	116,838	46.49%	251,340	9,542
2010	General	Nov. 2	Ron Kind (inc)	Democratic	126,380	50.28%	Michael Krsiean	Ind.	8,001	3.18%	251,340	9,542
2012	General	Nov. 6	Ron Kind (inc)	Democratic	217,712	64.08%	Ray Boland	Rep.	121,713	35.82%	339,764	95,999
2014	General	Nov. 4	Ron Kind (inc)	Democratic	155,368	56.46%	Tony Kurtz	Rep.	119,540	43.44%	275,161	35,828
2014	General	Nov. 4	Ron Kind (inc)	Democratic	155,368	56.46%	Ken Van Doren (write-in)	Ind.	128	0.05%	275,161	35,828
2016	Primary	Aug. 9	Ron Kind (inc)	Democratic	33,320	81.24%	Myron Buchholz	Dem.	7,689	18.75%	41,016	25,631
2016	General	Nov. 8	Ron Kind (inc)	Democratic	257,401	98.86%	Ryan Peterson (write-in)	Rep.	169	0.06%	260,370	254,601
2018	General	Nov. 6	Ron Kind (inc)	Democratic	187,888	59.65%	Steve Toft	Rep.	126,980	40.31%	314,989	60,908
2020	Primary	Aug. 11	Ron Kind (inc)	Democratic	53,064	80.59%	Mark Neumann	Dem.	12,765	19.39%	65,841	40,299
2020	General	Nov. 3	Ron Kind (inc)	Democratic	199,870	51.30%	Derrick Van Orden	Rep.	189,524	48.64%	389,618	10,346

U.S. House of Representatives
Preceded by Steve Gunderson	Member of the U.S. House of Representatives from Wisconsin's 3rd congressional district 1997–2023	Succeeded by Derrick Van Orden
Party political offices
Preceded by Cal Dooley; Jim Moran; Tim Roemer	Chair of the New Democrat Coalition; 2001–2007; Served alongside: Jim Davis and Adam Smith (2001–2005), Artur Davis and Ellen Tauscher (2005–2007)	Succeeded by Ellen Tauscher
Preceded by Joe Crowley	Chair of the New Democrat Coalition; 2013–2017	Succeeded by Jim Himes
U.S. order of precedence (ceremonial)
Preceded by Kevin Brady as Former U.S. Representative	Order of precedence of the United States as Former U.S. Representative	Succeeded by Elton Gallegly as Former U.S. Representative
