= Dave Obey =

American politician (born 1938)

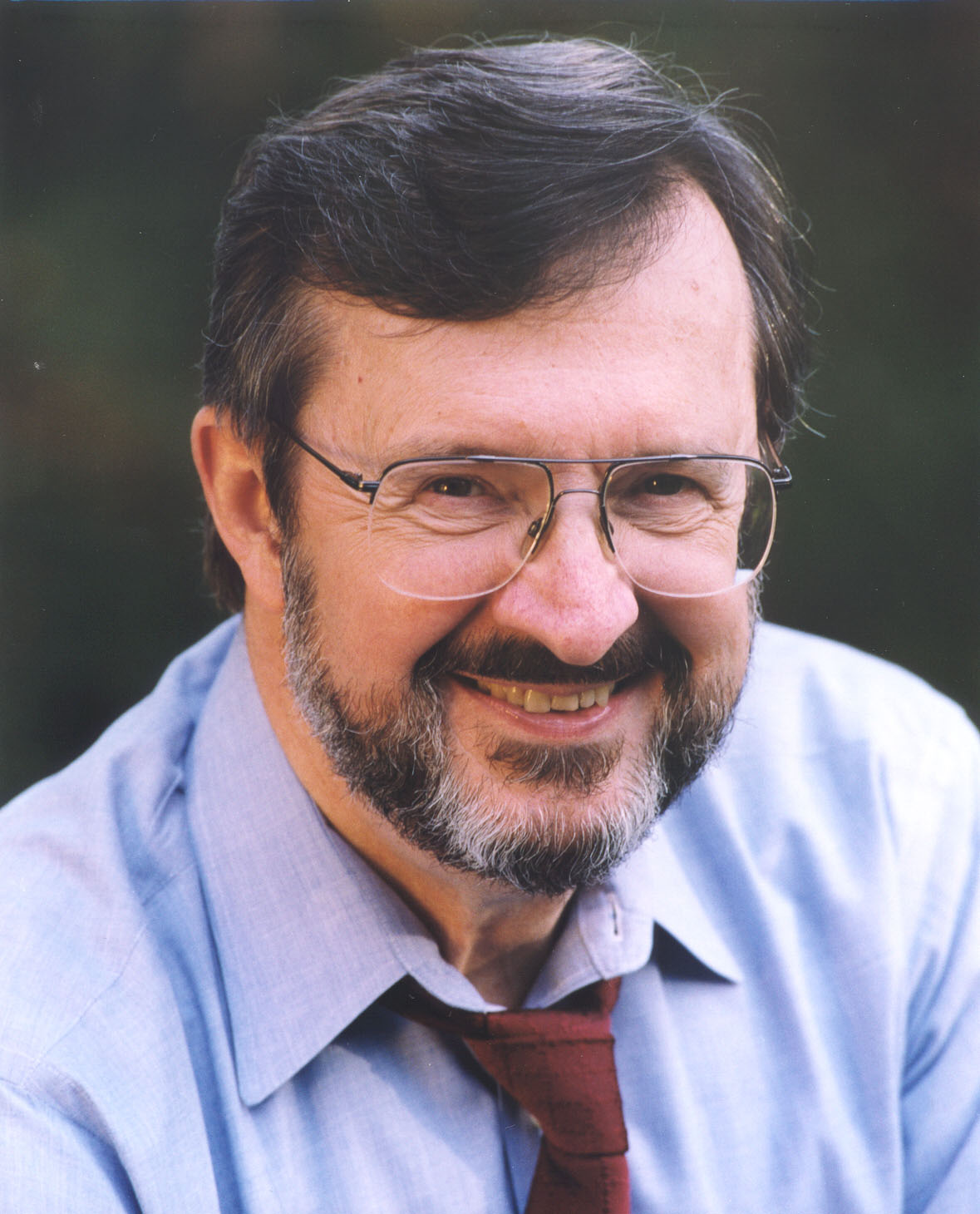

Chair of the House Appropriations Committee
- In office January 3, 2007 – January 3, 2011
- Preceded by: Jerry Lewis
- Succeeded by: Hal Rogers
- In office March 29, 1994 – January 3, 1995
- Preceded by: William Natcher
- Succeeded by: Bob Livingston

Ranking Member of the House Appropriations Committee
- In office January 3, 1995 – January 3, 2007
- Preceded by: Joseph M. McDade
- Succeeded by: Jerry Lewis

Member of the U.S. House of Representatives from Wisconsin's 7th district
- In office April 1, 1969 – January 3, 2011
- Preceded by: Melvin Laird
- Succeeded by: Sean Duffy

Member of the Wisconsin State Assembly from the 2nd Marathon County district
- In office January 7, 1963 – April 1, 1969
- Preceded by: Paul A. Luedtke
- Succeeded by: Tony Earl

Personal details
- Born: David Ross Obey; October 3, 1938 (age 88) Okmulgee, Oklahoma, U.S.
- Party: Democratic
- Spouse: Joan Obey (m. 1962; died 2023)
- Children: 2
- Education: University of Wisconsin, Wausau; University of Wisconsin, Madison (BS, MA)
- Obey's voice Obey criticizing President Bill Clinton's use of the line-item veto. Recorded November 8, 1997

David Ross Obey (/ˈoʊbiː/ OH-bee; born October 3, 1938) is an American lobbyist and former politician who served as a member of the United States House of Representatives for Wisconsin's 7th congressional district from 1969 to 2011. The district includes much of the northwestern portion of the state, including Wausau and Superior. He is a member of the Democratic Party, and served as Chairman of the powerful House Committee on Appropriations from 1994 to 1995 and again from 2007 to 2011. Until he was surpassed by Jim Sensenbrenner in 2020, Obey was the longest-serving member ever of the United States House of Representatives from the state of Wisconsin. Obey remains the longest serving Democratic Representative from Wisconsin.

== Early life and career ==
Obey was born in Okmulgee, Oklahoma, the son of Mary Jane (née Chellis) and Orville John Obey. In 1941, his family moved back to his parents' native Wisconsin, and Obey was raised in Wausau, Wisconsin, where he has lived since. He graduated from Wausau East High School and initially attended the University of Wisconsin branch campus at Wausau to save money before transferring to the University of Wisconsin–Madison, where he received his Bachelor of Arts degree in political science from and did graduate work in Soviet politics at the University of Wisconsin under a National Defense Education Act three-year scholarship.

During his youth, Obey identified as a Republican, and helped deliver campaign material for Senator Joseph McCarthy during his electoral campaigns. However, he left the party after seeing one of his teachers falsely branded as a communist by supporters of McCarthy. Obey also had come to identify with the progressive philosophy of Robert M. La Follette and began working for the electoral campaigns of Democrats such as Gaylord Nelson, Robert Kastenmeier, and William Proxmire, becoming affiliated with the Democratic Party sometime in the mid-1950s during his teenage years.

Before serving in Congress, Obey worked as a real estate broker.

== Wisconsin State Assembly ==
He was elected to the Wisconsin State Assembly in 1963 and served there until 1969. During his time in the state legislature he rose to the position of Assistant Majority leader for the Democratic caucus. Obey served in that role from 1967 until 1969, when he left the legislature to serve in the U.S. House of Representatives.

== U.S. House of Representatives ==
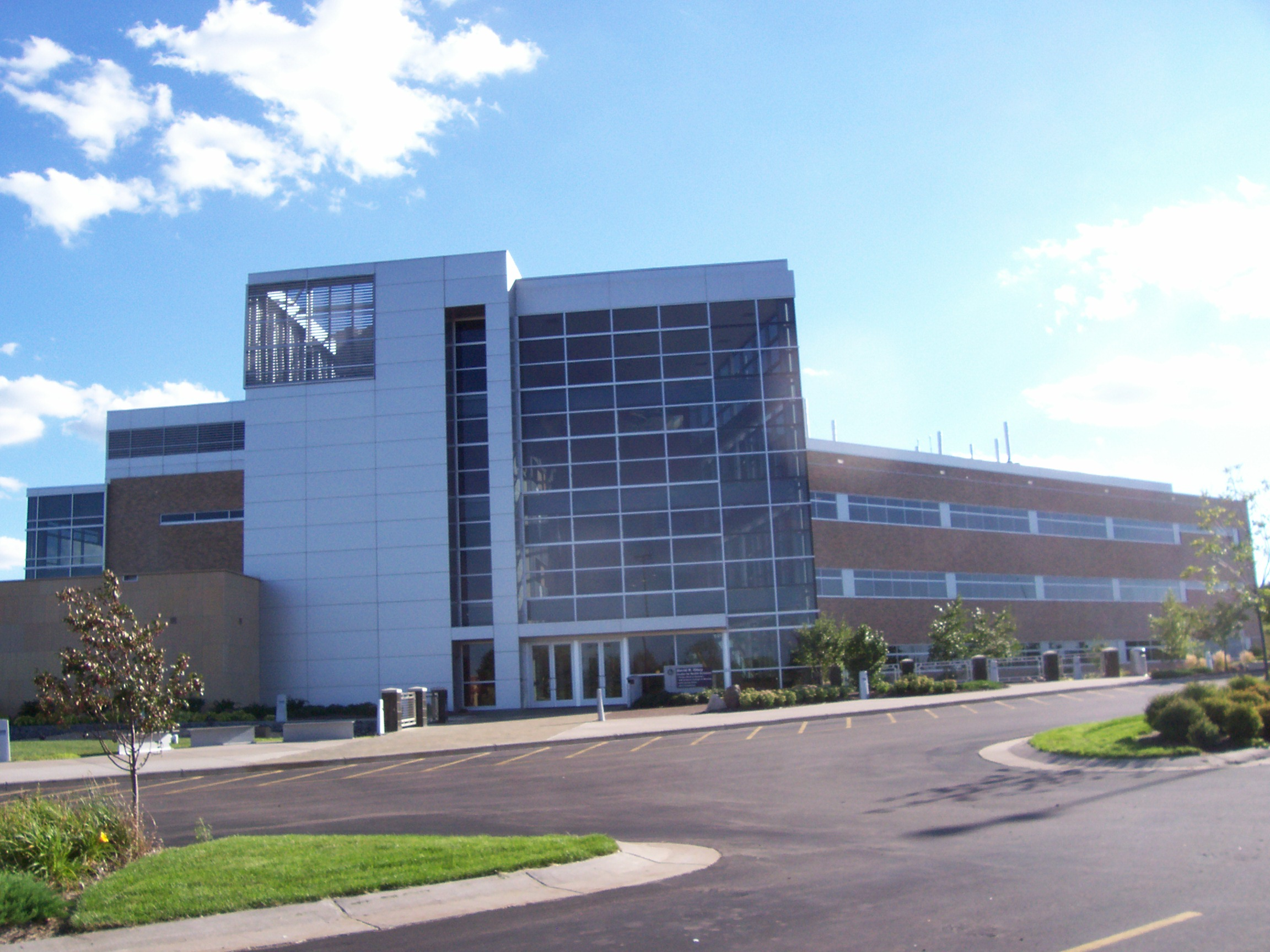
David Obey Center for Health Sciences at Northcentral Technical College in Wausau

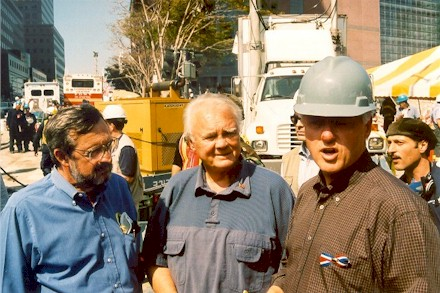
Dave Obey with former President Bill Clinton and Representative Bill Young in September 2001.

Obey was elected to the House to replace eight-term incumbent Republican Melvin R. Laird, who was appointed Secretary of Defense under President Richard Nixon. Obey, only 30 when he was elected, became the youngest member of Congress upon taking his seat, as well as the first Democrat to represent the district in the 20th century. He was elected to a full term in 1970 and was reelected 18 times. Obey faced his closest race in 1972, during his bid for a second full term, when his district was merged with the neighboring 10th District of Republican Alvin O'Konski, a 15-term incumbent. However, Obey retained 60 percent of his former territory, and was handily reelected in subsequent contests.

In Congress, Obey chaired the commission to write the House's Code of Ethics. Among the reforms he instituted was one requiring members of the House to disclose their personal financial dealings so the public would be made aware of any potential conflicts of interest. Obey served as chairman of the House Appropriations Committee from 2007 to 2011; he briefly chaired this committee from 1994 to 1995 and served as its ranking Democrat from 1995 to 2007. He also chaired its Subcommittee on Labor.

Obey was one of the most liberal members of the House; he considers himself a progressive in the tradition of Robert La Follette. Obey had risen to the position of fifth ranking House Democrat since his party retook control of Congress.

During the 1970s, Obey was the leader of the Democratic Study Group, which was a caucus of liberal Democrats in the House which was intended to "counter" the influence of conservative and southern Democrats.

His "Obey Amendment" has prohibited the export of the Lockheed Martin F-22 Raptor to American allies such as Japan.

Obey also is remembered for being the congressman who intervened when fellow Democrat Harold Ford, Jr. approached Republican Jean Schmidt on the House floor in 2005. Ford was upset because Schmidt had called Congressman John Murtha a coward for advocating a withdrawal of American forces in Iraq.

Obey holds a critical view of the mainstream American news media, as evidenced by his words on June 13, 2008, upon the sudden death of NBC News Washington Bureau Chief Tim Russert. Obey said of Russert: "Tim Russert's death is not just a body blow for NBC News; it is a body blow for the nation and for anyone who cherishes newsmen and women who have remained devoted to reporting hard news in an era increasingly consumed by trivia." Dave Obey announced an end to his congressional career on May 5, 2010, with press releases being released on May 6.

On June 30, 2010, Obey proposed an amendment to a supplemental war spending bill that would allocate $10 billion to prevent expected teacher layoffs from school districts nationwide. The amendment, which passed the House on July 1, 2010, proposed siphoning off $500 million from the Race to the Top fund as well as $300 million designated for charter schools and teacher incentive pay. In response, the White House released a statement threatening a veto if the bill is passed by the Senate.

On March 21, 2010, Obey swung the same gavel used to pass Medicare in 1965, but this time to pass the Patient Protection and Affordable Care Act.

=== Political campaigns ===
In 1994, Obey only won reelection by eight points as the Democrats lost control of the House during the Republican Revolution.

==== 2010 ====
Obey was expected to run in 2010, having raised a warchest of $1.4 million. However, Obey was facing tough poll numbers in his district, plus his age and the death of close colleague John Murtha and his frustration with the White House convinced him to bow out of the race.

On May 5, 2010, Obey announced that he would not seek reelection to Congress.

Upon his retirement, the seat was won by Republican Sean Duffy, who defeated Democratic State Senator Julie Lassa.

== Later career ==
Obey left Congress in January 2011, and was succeeded by Republican Sean Duffy. He began working for Gephardt Government Affairs, a lobbying firm founded by former U.S. House Majority Leader Dick Gephardt, in June 2011.

== Personal life ==
While Obey was still a graduate student, he married Joan Lepinski. The two remained married until Joan's death in 2023. Obey and his wife had two children together.

== Books ==
- Foreword to Along Wisconsin’s Ice Age Trail by Eric Sherman and Andrew Hanson III (2008, University of Wisconsin Press) ISBN 978-0-299-22664-0
- Raising Hell for Justice: The Washington Battles of a Heartland Progressive (2008, University of Wisconsin Press) ISBN 978-0-299-22540-7

U.S. House of Representatives
Preceded by Melvin Laird	Member of the U.S. House of Representatives from Wisconsin's 7th congressional district 1969–2011	Succeeded by Sean Duffy
New office	Chair of the House Administrative Review Commission; 1976–1977	Position abolished
Preceded by Lloyd Bentsen	Chair of the Joint Economic Committee; 1985–1987	Succeeded by Paul Sarbanes
Preceded by William Natcher	Chair of the House Appropriations Committee; 1994–1995	Succeeded by Bob Livingston
Preceded by Joseph M. McDade	Ranking Member of the House Appropriations Committee; 1995–2007	Succeeded by Jerry Lewis
Preceded by Jerry Lewis	Chair of the House Appropriations Committee; 2007–2011	Succeeded by Hal Rogers
Party political offices
New office	Chair of the Democratic House Accounts Task Force; 1975–1976	Position abolished
U.S. order of precedence (ceremonial)
Preceded by Jim Sensenbrenner as Former U.S. Representative	Order of precedence of the United States as Former U.S. Representative	Succeeded by George Miller as Former U.S. Representative
