= 2016 United States House of Representatives elections in Wisconsin =

- November 8, 2016

All 8 Wisconsin seats to the United States House of Representatives
	Majority party	Minority party
Party	Republican	Democratic
Last election	5	3
Seats won	5	3
Seat change	Steady	Steady
Popular vote	1,270,448	1,379,998
Percentage	45.81%	49.76%
Swing	▼6.55%	▲2.95%

Republican
40–50%
50–60%
60–70%
70–80%
Democratic
40–50%
50–60%
60–70%
70–80%
80–90%
90>%

The 2016 United States House of Representatives elections in Wisconsin were held on Tuesday, November 8, 2016, to elect the eight U.S. representatives from the state of Wisconsin, one from each of the state's eight congressional districts. The elections coincided with the elections of other federal and state offices, including President of the United States and U.S. Senator from Wisconsin. The primaries were held on August 9.

Wisconsin was one of two states in which the party that won the state's popular vote did not win a majority of seats in 2016, the other state being Virginia.

== District 1 ==
2016 Wisconsin's 1st congressional district election
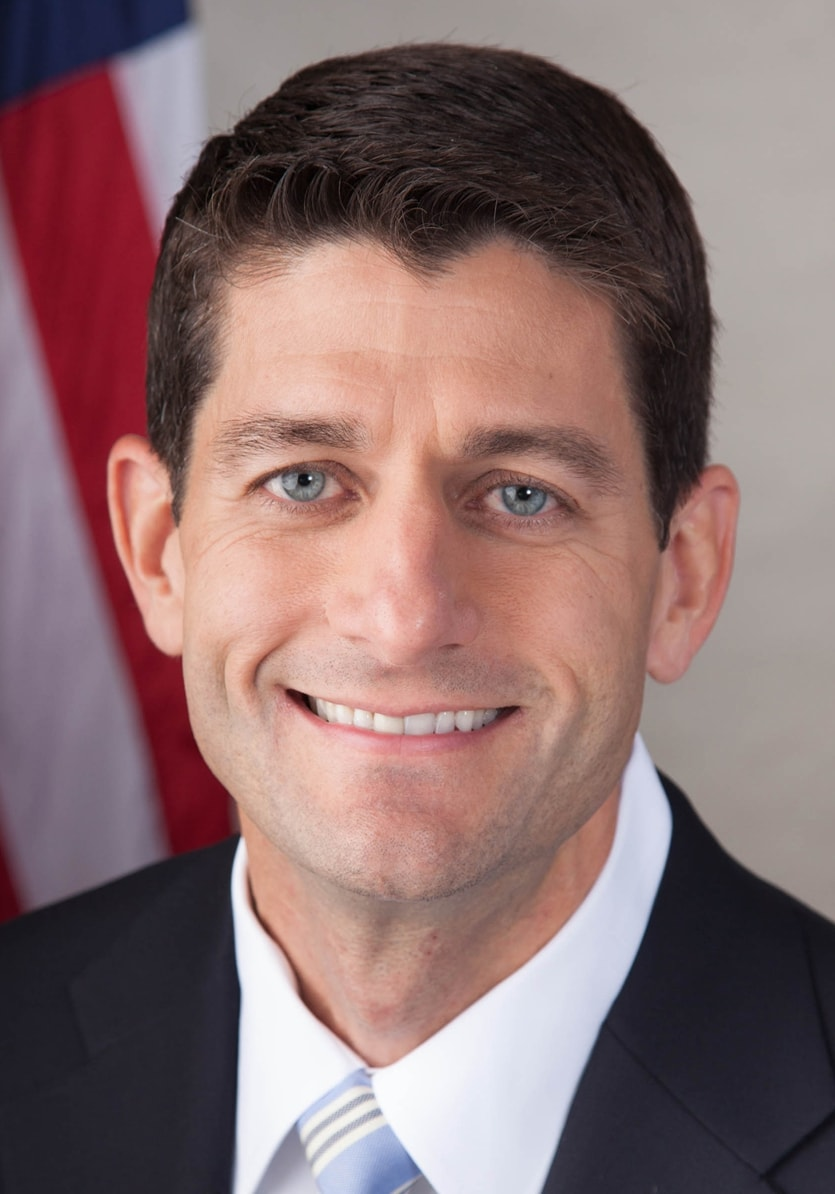

Nominee	Paul Ryan	Ryan Solen
Party	Republican	Democratic
Popular vote	230,072	107,003
Percentage	64.9%	30.2%
- Ryan: 40–50% 50–60% 60–70% 70–80% 80–90% >90% Solen: 40–50% 50–60% 60–70% 70–80% 80–90% Tie: 40–50% 50% No votes
U.S. Representative before election
Paul Ryan
Republican
Elected U.S. Representative
Paul Ryan
Republican

Republican incumbent Paul Ryan, who had represented the 1st district since 1999, ran for re-election. This district had a PVI of R+3. Since October 29, 2015 Ryan sat as the Speaker of the House.

=== Republican primary ===
==== Candidates ====
===== Nominee =====
- Paul Ryan, incumbent U.S. Representative and Speaker of the United States House of Representatives

===== Eliminated in primary =====
- Paul Nehlen, senior vice-president of operations at Neptune-Benson

==== Campaign ====
Nehlen filed campaign papers to run against Ryan on April 1, 2016, and officially launched his campaign on April 14, with the opening of his first campaign office in Kenosha, Wisconsin. Nehlen claimed to have been a Paul Ryan supporter and worked for his election in earlier campaigns but at least one conservative media report questioned that claim.

According to a Janesville Gazette report about his campaign launch, "Nehlen declined to talk about issues such as abortion and would not say what presidential candidate he supports or whether he would support a Republican running for the presidency." Nehlen ran on a platform calling for secure borders, enforcement of existing immigration laws, and reduced government spending, and he opposed the Trans-Pacific Partnership treaty. On May 5, 2016, Nehlen pledged to support Donald Trump for the presidency.

The Milwaukee Journal Sentinel reported on July 14, 2016, that Nehlen had hired Dan Backer as his campaign treasurer. Backer is nationally known for his fundraising activities.

In an August 2016 radio interview, Nehlen suggested that the United States should "have a discussion" about the possibility of deporting Sharia-adherent Muslims living in the country. The remark occurred when Nehlen was asked about his thoughts regarding the dispute between 2016 Republican presidential candidate Donald Trump and Khizr and Ghazala Khan, the parents of Humayun Khan, an American Muslim Army captain who died in a suicide bombing while serving in Iraq in 2004. During the interview, Nehlen also said that every mosque in the United States should be monitored for signs of potential radicalization.

Because of Nehlen's support for Trump, Trump publicly thanked him on Twitter and later told The Washington Post that Nehlen was "running a very good campaign", even though he did not endorse him. On August 5, 2016, Trump endorsed Ryan's re-election after pressure from fellow Republican leaders.

==== Endorsements ====
Paul Nehlen

Statewide officials

- Sarah Palin, former governor of Alaska and the Republican Party nominee for Vice President in 2008

Organizations

- Tea Party Patriots

Individuals

- Ann Coulter, political commentator and author
- Ronald F. Maxwell, film director and writer
Paul Ryan

U.S. Executive Branch officials

- Donald Trump, businessman and 2016 Republican Presidential Nominee

==== Results ====
Republican primary results
Party	Candidate	Votes	%
Republican	Paul Ryan (incumbent)	57,364	84.1
Republican	Paul Nehlen	10,864	15.9
Republican	Write-ins	15	0.0
Total votes		68,243	100

=== Democratic primary ===
==== Candidates ====
===== Nominee =====
- Ryan Solen, Democratic Party of Wisconsin Veteran's Caucus Secretary/Treasurer

===== Eliminated in primary =====
- Tom Breu, plumbing engineer

===== Declined =====
- Rob Zerban, former member of the Kenosha County Board and nominee for this seat in 2012 & 2014

==== Results ====
Democratic primary results
Party	Candidate	Votes	%
Democratic	Ryan Solen	14,639	58.9
Democratic	Tom Breu	10,142	40.8
Democratic	Write-ins	86	0.3
Total votes		24,867	100.0

=== Libertarian primary ===
==== Candidates ====
===== Nominee =====
- Jason Lebeck, I.T. technician

==== Results ====
Libertarian primary results
Party	Candidate	Votes	%
Libertarian	Jason Lebeck	195	97.5
Libertarian	Write-ins	5	2.5
Total votes		200	100.0

=== Independents ===
- Spencer Zimmerman, appears on the ballot as "Trump Conservative"

=== General election ===
==== Predictions ====
Source	Ranking	As of
The Cook Political Report	Safe R	November 7, 2016
Daily Kos Elections	Safe R	November 7, 2016
Rothenberg	Safe R	November 3, 2016
Sabato's Crystal Ball	Safe R	November 7, 2016
RCP	Safe R	October 31, 2016

==== Results ====
Wisconsin's 1st congressional district, 2016
Party	Candidate	Votes	%
Republican	Paul Ryan (incumbent)	230,072	64.9
Democratic	Ryan Solen	107,003	30.2
Independent	Spencer Zimmerman	9,429	2.7
Libertarian	Jason Lebeck	7,486	2.1
n/a	Write-ins	255	0.1
Total votes		354,245	100.0
Republican hold			

== District 2 ==
2016 Wisconsin's 2nd congressional district election
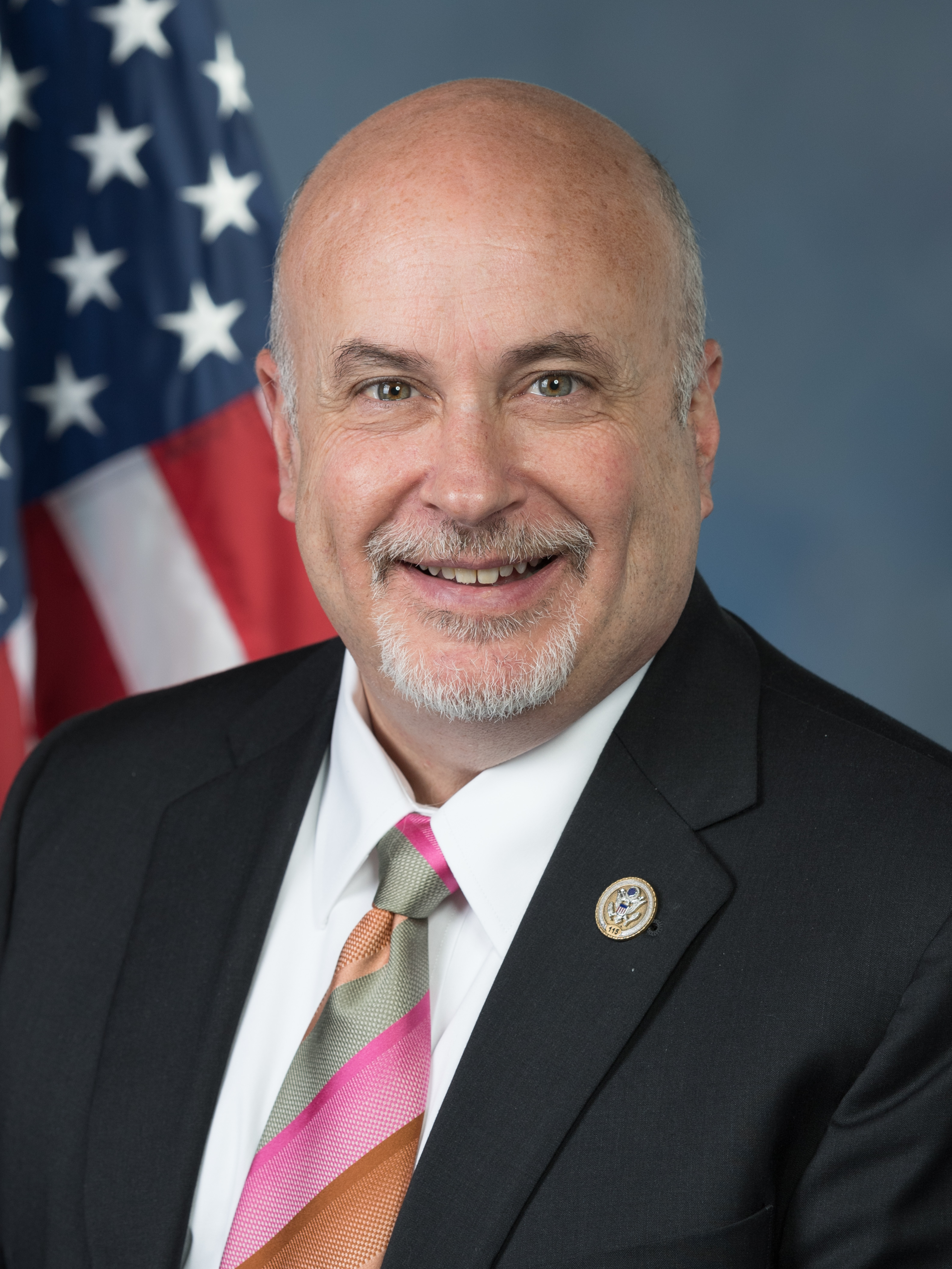

Nominee	Mark Pocan	Peter Theron
Party	Democratic	Republican
Popular vote	273,537	124,044
Percentage	68.7%	31.2%
- Pocan: 50–60% 60–70% 70–80% 80–90% >90% Theron: 50–60% 60–70% 80–90% >90% Tie: 50% No votes
U.S. Representative before election
Mark Pocan
Democratic
Elected U.S. Representative
Mark Pocan
Democratic

Democratic incumbent Mark Pocan, who had represented the 2nd district since 2013, ran for re-election. This district had a PVI of D+17.

=== Democratic primary ===
==== Candidates ====
===== Nominee =====
- Mark Pocan, incumbent U.S. Representative

==== Results ====
Democratic primary results
Party	Candidate	Votes	%
Democratic	Mark Pocan (incumbent)	71,461	99.5
Democratic	Write-ins	395	0.5
Total votes		71,856	100

=== Republican primary ===
==== Candidates ====
===== Nominee =====
- Peter Theron, professor and nominee for this seat in 2008 & 2014

==== Results ====
Republican primary results
Party	Candidate	Votes	%
Republican	Peter Theron	12,866	99.4
Republican	Write-ins	79	0.6
Total votes		12,945	100.0

=== General election ===
==== Predictions ====
Source	Ranking	As of
The Cook Political Report	Safe D	November 7, 2016
Daily Kos Elections	Safe D	November 7, 2016
Rothenberg	Safe D	November 3, 2016
Sabato's Crystal Ball	Safe D	November 7, 2016
RCP	Safe D	October 31, 2016

==== Results ====
Wisconsin's 2nd congressional district, 2016
Party	Candidate	Votes	%
Democratic	Mark Pocan (incumbent)	273,537	68.7
Republican	Peter Theron	124,044	31.2
n/a	Write-ins	479	0.1
Total votes		398,060	100.0
Democratic hold			

== District 3 ==
2016 Wisconsin's 3rd congressional district election
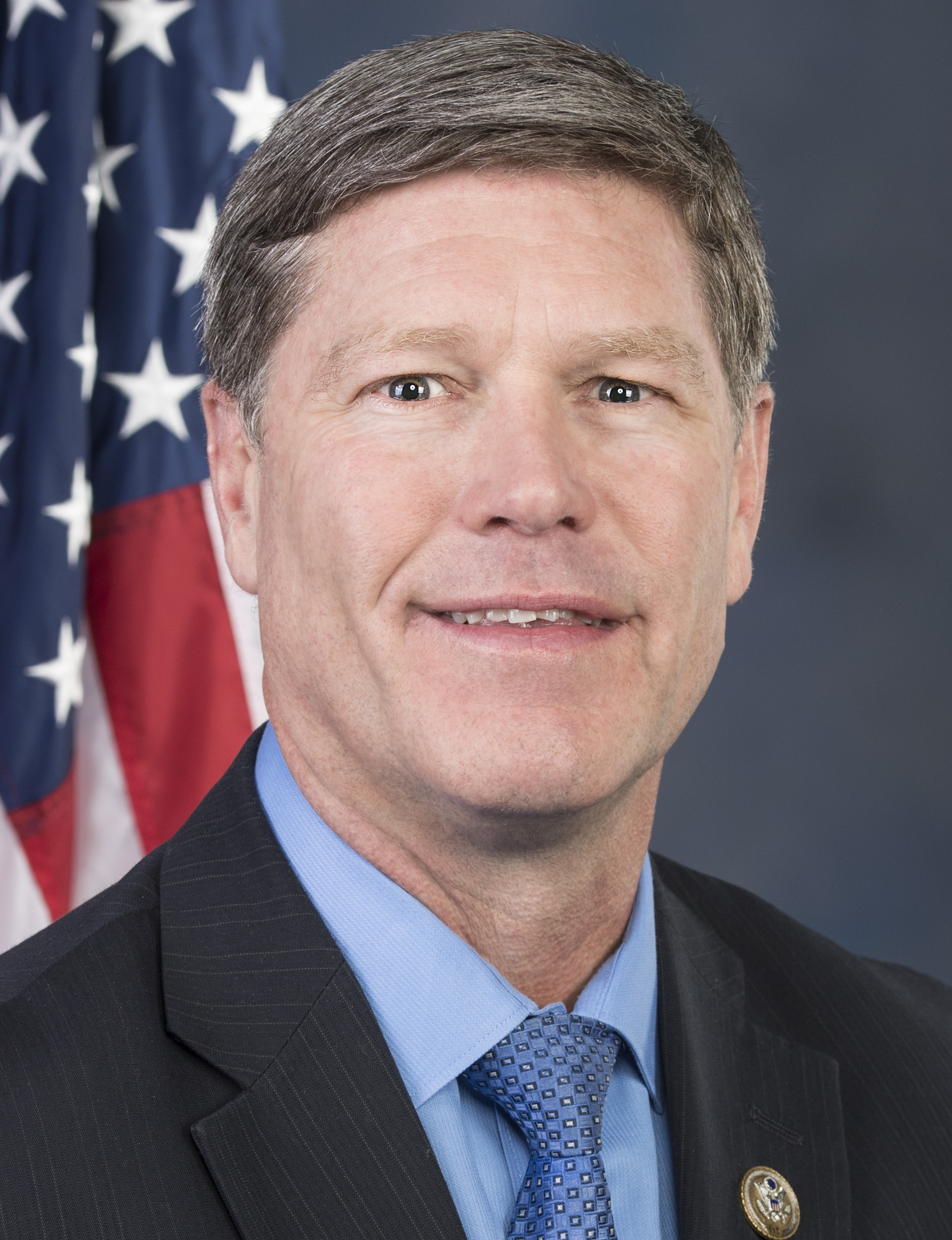

Nominee	Ron Kind	Ryan Peterson (write-in)
Party	Democratic	Republican
Popular vote	257,401	169
Percentage	98.9%	0.1%
- Kind: 80–90% >90% No votes
U.S. Representative before election
Ron Kind
Democratic
Elected U.S. Representative
Ron Kind
Democratic

Democratic incumbent Ron Kind, who had represented the 3rd district since 1996, ran for re-election. He was re-elected with 56.5% of the vote in 2014, and the district had a PVI of D+5. Despite Republican nominee Donald Trump carrying the district in the concurrent presidential election, Kind was reelected unopposed.

=== Democratic primary ===
==== Candidates ====
===== Nominee =====
- Ron Kind, incumbent U.S. Representative

===== Eliminated in primary =====
- Myron Buchholz, retired teacher

==== Results ====
Democratic primary results
Party	Candidate	Votes	%
Democratic	Ron Kind (incumbent)	33,320	81.2
Democratic	Myron Buchholz	7,689	18.8
Democratic	Write-ins	7	0.0
Total votes		41,016	100.0

=== General election ===
==== Predictions ====
Source	Ranking	As of
The Cook Political Report	Safe D	November 7, 2016
Daily Kos Elections	Safe D	November 7, 2016
Rothenberg	Safe D	November 3, 2016
Sabato's Crystal Ball	Safe D	November 7, 2016
RCP	Safe D	October 31, 2016

==== Results ====
Wisconsin's 3rd congressional district, 2016
Party	Candidate	Votes	%
Democratic	Ron Kind (incumbent)	257,401	98.9
Republican	Ryan Peterson (write-in)	169	0.1
n/a	Write-ins	2,800	1.0
Total votes		260,370	100.0
Democratic hold			

== District 4 ==
2016 Wisconsin's 4th congressional district election
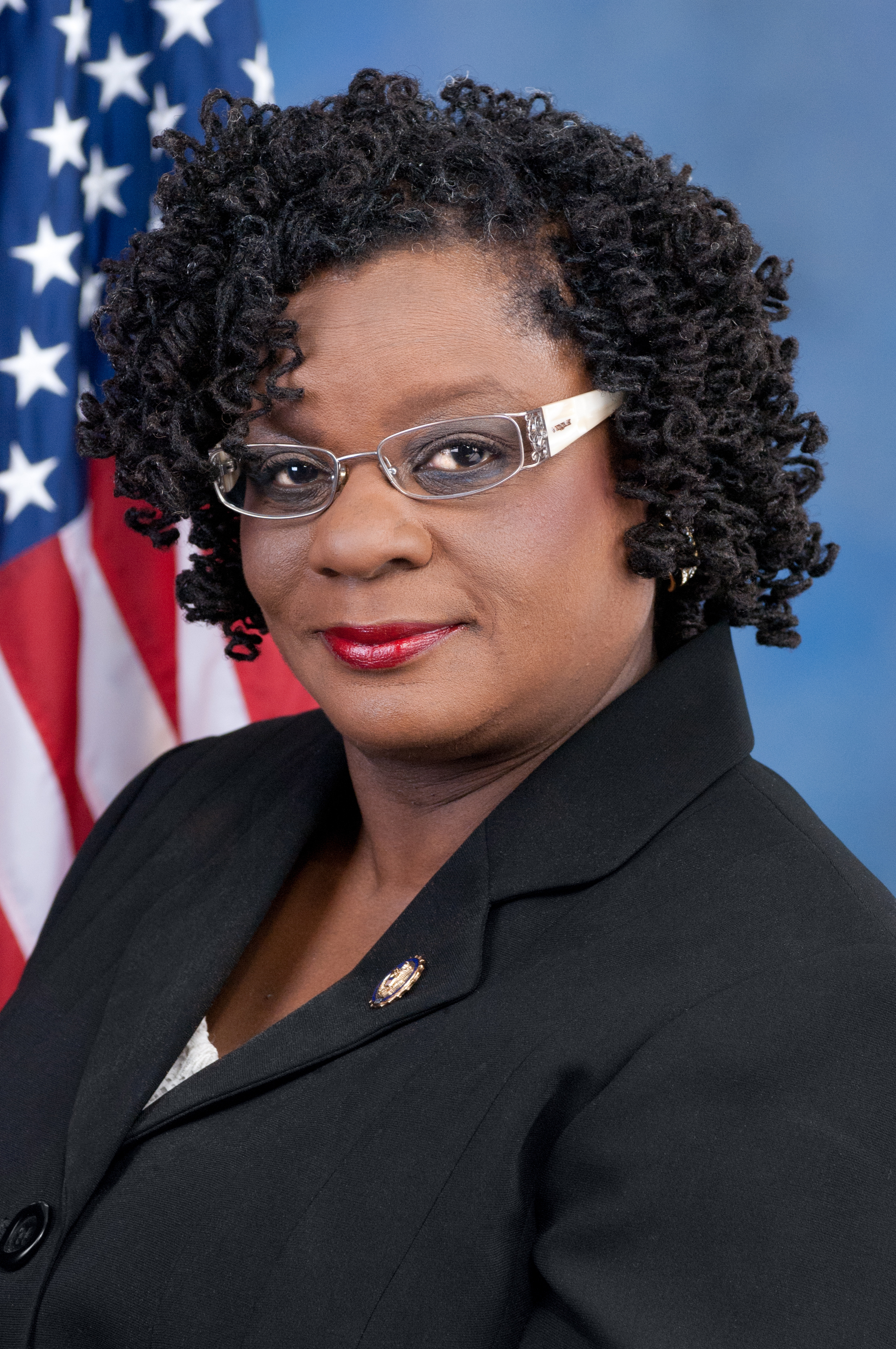

Nominee	Gwen Moore	Robert Raymond	Andy Craig
Party	Democratic	Independent	Libertarian
Popular vote	220,181	33,494	32,183
Percentage	76.7%	11.7%	11.2%
- Precinct results Moore: 40–50% 50–60% 60–70% 70–80% 80–90% >90% Raymond: 70–80% No votes
U.S. Representative before election
Gwen Moore
Democratic
Elected U.S. Representative
Gwen Moore
Democratic

Democratic incumbent Gwen Moore, who had represented the 4th district since 2005, ran for re-election. She was re-elected with 70.2% of the vote in 2014 and the district had a PVI of D+23.

=== Democratic primary ===
==== Candidates ====
===== Nominee =====
- Gwen Moore, incumbent U.S. Representative

===== Eliminated in primary =====
- Gary George, former state senator

==== Results ====
Democratic primary results
Party	Candidate	Votes	%
Democratic	Gwen Moore (incumbent)	55,256	84.5
Democratic	Gary George	10,013	15.3
Democratic	Write-ins	128	0.2
Total votes		65,397	100.0

=== Republican primary ===
==== Candidates ====
===== Declined =====
- Dan Sebring, automobile repair shop owner and nominee for this seat in 2010, 2012, and 2014

=== Libertarian primary ===
==== Candidates ====
===== Nominee =====
- Andy Craig, political activist and 2014 candidate for Secretary of State of Wisconsin

==== Results ====
Libertarian primary results
Party	Candidate	Votes	%
Libertarian	Andy Craig	127	100.0

=== General election ===
==== Predictions ====
Source	Ranking	As of
The Cook Political Report	Safe D	November 7, 2016
Daily Kos Elections	Safe D	November 7, 2016
Rothenberg	Safe D	November 3, 2016
Sabato's Crystal Ball	Safe D	November 7, 2016
RCP	Safe D	October 31, 2016

==== Results ====
Wisconsin's 4th congressional district, 2016
Party	Candidate	Votes	%
Democratic	Gwen Moore (incumbent)	220,181	76.7
Independent	Robert Raymond	33,494	11.7
Libertarian	Andy Craig	32,183	11.2
n/a	Write-ins	1,051	0.4
Total votes		286,909	100.0
Democratic hold			

== District 5 ==
2016 Wisconsin's 5th congressional district election
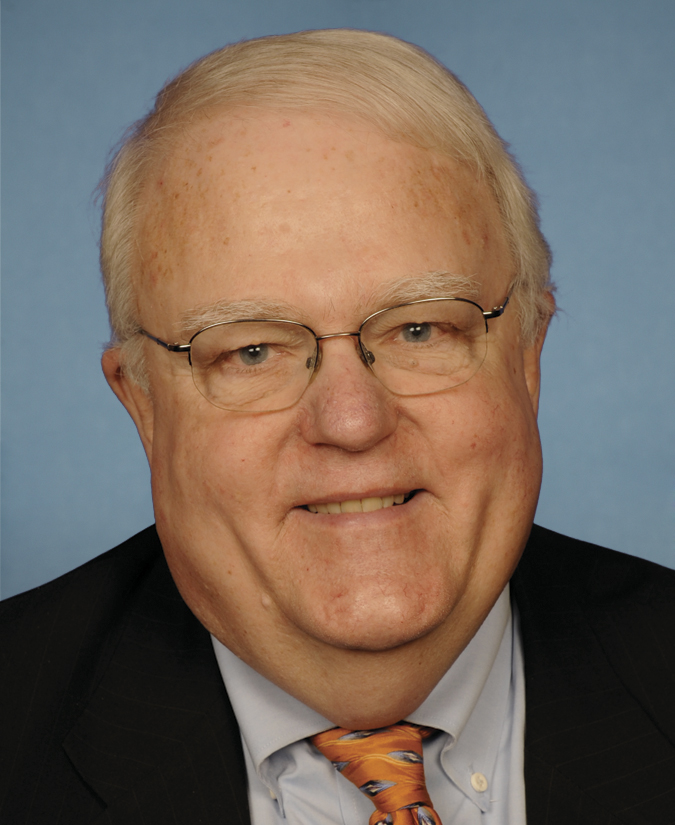

Nominee	Jim Sensenbrenner	Khary Penebaker
Party	Republican	Democratic
Popular vote	260,706	114,477
Percentage	66.7%	29.3%
- Sensenbrenner: 40–50% 50–60% 60–70% 70–80% 80–90% >90% Penebaker: 40–50% 50–60% 60–70% >90% Tie: 40–50% No votes
U.S. Representative before election
Jim Sensenbrenner
Republican
Elected U.S. Representative
Jim Sensenbrenner
Republican

Republican incumbent Jim Sensenbrenner, who had represented the 5th district since 1978, ran for re-election. He was re-elected with 69.5% of the vote in 2014 and the district had a PVI of R+13.

=== Republican primary ===
==== Candidates ====
===== Nominee =====
- Jim Sensenbrenner, incumbent U.S. Representative

==== Results ====
Republican primary results
Party	Candidate	Votes	%
Republican	James Sensenbrenner (incumbent)	34,203	99.7
Republican	Write-ins	100	0.3
Total votes		34,303	100.0

=== Democratic primary ===
==== Candidates ====
===== Nominee =====
- Khary Penebaker, businessman and entrepreneur

==== Results ====
Democratic primary results
Party	Candidate	Votes	%
Democratic	Khary Penebaker	19,353	99.4
Democratic	Write-ins	115	0.6
Total votes		19,468	100.0

=== Libertarian primary ===
==== Candidates ====
===== Nominee =====
- John Arndt

==== Results ====
Libertarian primary results
Party	Candidate	Votes	%
Libertarian	John Arndt	243	98.4
Libertarian	Write-ins	4	1.6
Total votes		247	100.0

=== General election ===
==== Predictions ====
Source	Ranking	As of
The Cook Political Report	Safe R	November 7, 2016
Daily Kos Elections	Safe R	November 7, 2016
Rothenberg	Safe R	November 3, 2016
Sabato's Crystal Ball	Safe R	November 7, 2016
RCP	Safe R	October 31, 2016

==== Results ====
Wisconsin's 5th congressional district, 2016
Party	Candidate	Votes	%
Republican	James Sensenbrenner (incumbent)	260,706	66.7
Democratic	Khary Penebaker	114,477	29.3
Libertarian	John Arndt	15,324	3.9
n/a	Write-ins	337	0.1
Total votes		390,844	100.0
Republican hold			

== District 6 ==
2016 Wisconsin's 6th congressional district election
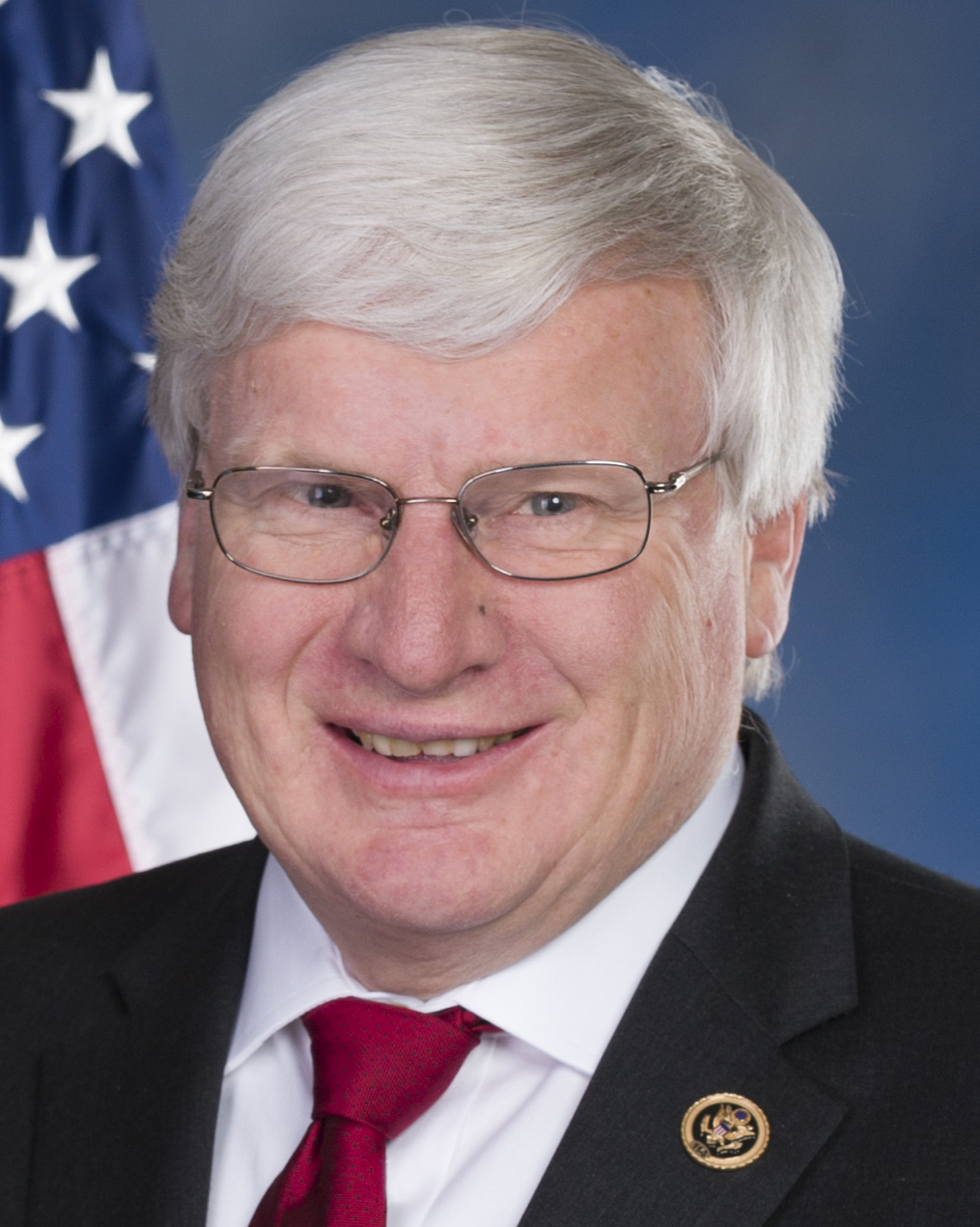

Nominee	Glenn Grothman	Sarah Lloyd	Jeff Dahlke
Party	Republican	Democratic	Independent
Popular vote	204,147	133,072	19,716
Percentage	57.1%	37.3%	5.5%
- Grothman: 40–50% 50–60% 60–70% 70–80% 80–90% >90% Lloyd: 40–50% 50–60% 60–70% >90% Tie: 40–50% 50% No votes
U.S. Representative before election
Glenn Grothman
Republican
Elected U.S. Representative
Glenn Grothman
Republican

Republican incumbent Glenn Grothman who had represented the 6th district since 2015, ran for re-election. He was elected with 56.8% of the vote in 2014 and the district has a PVI of R+5.

=== Republican primary ===
==== Candidates ====
===== Nominee =====
- Glenn Grothman, incumbent U.S. Representative

==== Results ====
Republican primary results
Party	Candidate	Votes	%
Republican	Glenn Grothman (incumbent)	29,795	99.6
Republican	Write-ins	105	0.4
Total votes		29,900	100.0

=== Democratic primary ===
==== Candidates ====
===== Nominee =====
- Sarah Lloyd, farmer

===== Eliminated in primary =====
- Michael Slattery, farmer

==== Results ====
Democratic primary results
Party	Candidate	Votes	%
Democratic	Sarah Lloyd	19,652	75.1
Democratic	Michael Slattery	6,459	24.7
Democratic	Write-ins	43	0.2
Total votes		26,154	100.0

=== General election ===
==== Predictions ====
Source	Ranking	As of
The Cook Political Report	Safe R	November 7, 2016
Daily Kos Elections	Safe R	November 7, 2016
Rothenberg	Safe R	November 3, 2016
Sabato's Crystal Ball	Safe R	November 7, 2016
RCP	Safe R	October 31, 2016

==== Results ====
Wisconsin's 6th congressional district, 2016
Party	Candidate	Votes	%
Republican	Glenn Grothman (incumbent)	204,147	57.1
Democratic	Sarah Lloyd	133,072	37.3
Independent	Jeff Dahlke	19,716	5.5
n/a	Write-ins	248	0.1
Total votes		357,183	100.0
Republican hold			

== District 7 ==
2016 Wisconsin's 7th congressional district election
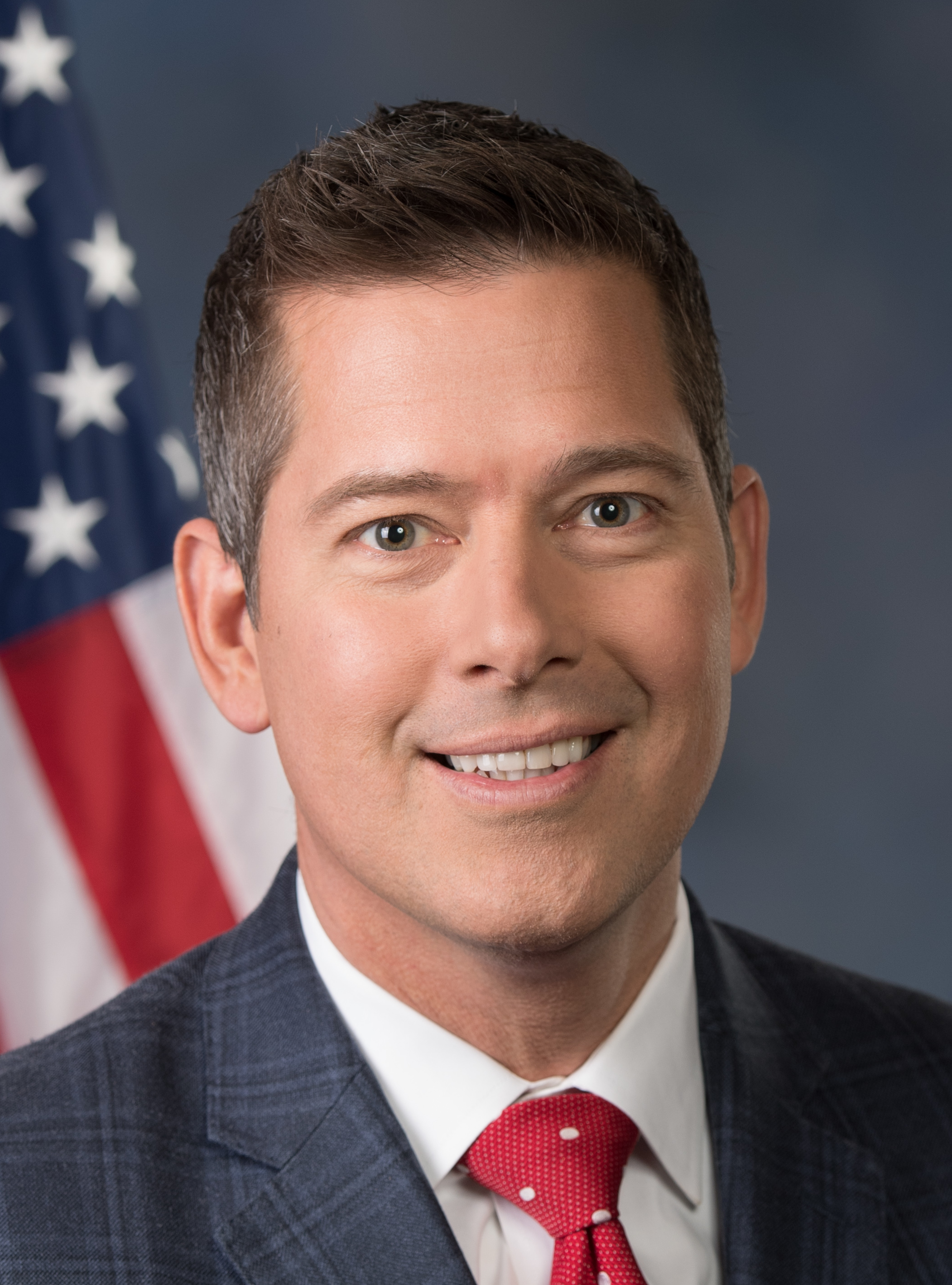

Nominee	Sean Duffy	Mary Hoeft
Party	Republican	Democratic
Popular vote	223,418	138,643
Percentage	61.6%	38.3%
- Duffy: 50–60% 60–70% 70–80% 80–90% >90% Hoeft: 50–60% 60–70% 70–80% 80–90% >90% Tie: 40–50% 50% No votes
U.S. Representative before election
Sean Duffy
Republican
Elected U.S. Representative
Sean Duffy
Republican

Republican incumbent Sean Duffy, who had represented the 7th district since 2011, ran for re-election. He was re-elected with 59.3% of the vote in 2014 and the district has a PVI of R+2.

=== Republican primary ===
==== Candidates ====
===== Nominee =====
- Sean Duffy, incumbent U.S. Representative

===== Eliminated in primary =====
- Don Raihala, small business owner

==== Results ====
Republican primary results
Party	Candidate	Votes	%
Republican	Sean Duffy (incumbent)	29,501	89.4
Republican	Don Raihala	3,456	10.5
Republican	Write-ins	24	0.1
Total votes		32,981	100.0

=== Democratic primary ===
==== Candidates ====
===== Nominee =====
- Mary Hoeft, university professor

===== Eliminated in primary =====
- Joel Lewis, Marathon County Board Supervisor

===== Withdrawn =====
- Kirk Bangstad, political consultant
- Ethel Quisler, independent contractor

===== Declined =====
- Kelly Westlund, businesswoman, Ashland City Council member and nominee for this seat in 2014

==== Results ====
Democratic primary results
Party	Candidate	Votes	%
Democratic	Mary Hoeft	27,289	80.6
Democratic	Joel Lewis	6,531	19.3
Democratic	Write-ins	50	0.1
Total votes		33,870	100.0

=== General election ===
==== Predictions ====
Source	Ranking	As of
The Cook Political Report	Safe R	November 7, 2016
Daily Kos Elections	Safe R	November 7, 2016
Rothenberg	Safe R	November 3, 2016
Sabato's Crystal Ball	Safe R	November 7, 2016
RCP	Safe R	October 31, 2016

==== Debate ====
2016 Wisconsin's 7th congressional district debate
No.	Date	Host	Moderator	Link	Republican	Democratic
Key: P Participant A Absent N Not invited I Invited W Withdrawn						
Key: P Participant A Absent N Not invited I Invited W Withdrawn					Sean Duffy	Mary Hoeft
1	Nov. 3, 2016			YouTube	P	P

==== Results ====
Wisconsin's 7th congressional district, 2016
Party	Candidate	Votes	%
Republican	Sean Duffy (incumbent)	223,418	61.6
Democratic	Mary Hoeft	138,643	38.3
n/a	Write-ins	210	0.1
Total votes		362,271	100.0
Republican hold			

== District 8 ==
2016 Wisconsin's 8th congressional district election
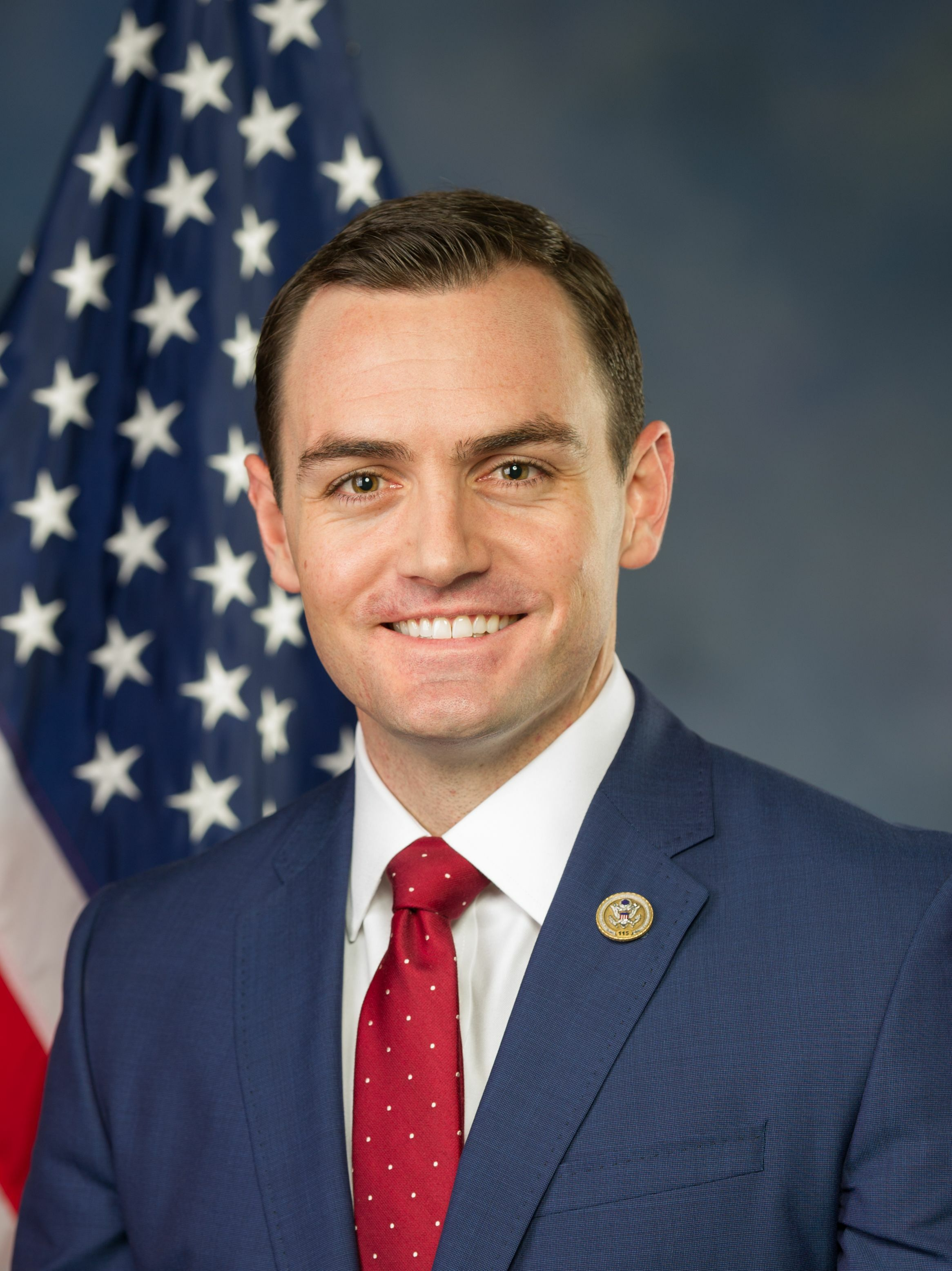

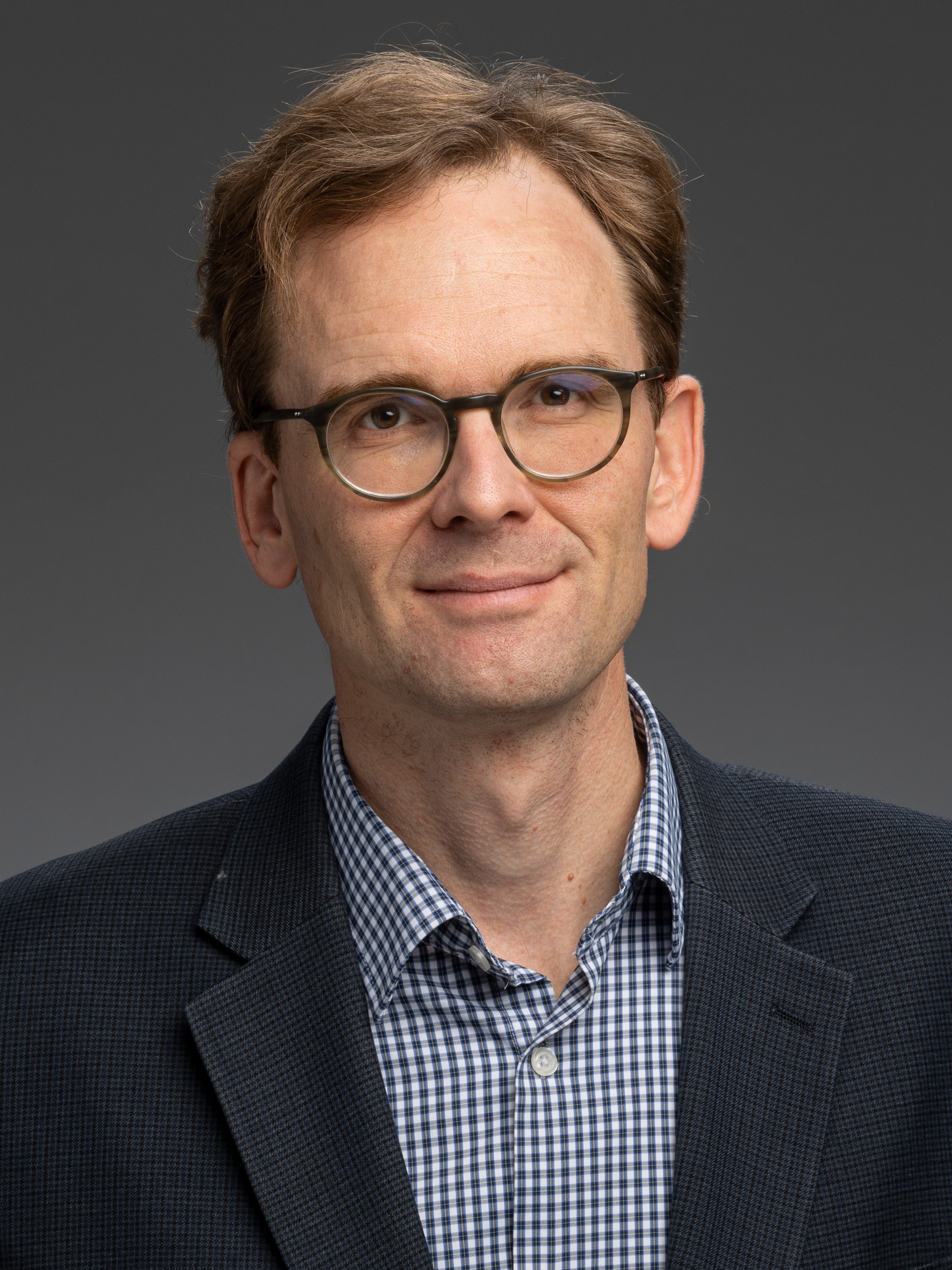
Nominee	Mike Gallagher	Tom Nelson
Party	Republican	Democratic
Popular vote	227,892	135,682
Percentage	62.6%	37.3%
- Gallagher: 40–50% 50–60% 60–70% 70–80% 80–90% >90% Nelson: 50–60% 60–70% 70–80% 80–90% Tie: 50% No votes
U.S. Representative before election
Reid Ribble
Republican
Elected U.S. Representative
Mike Gallagher
Republican

Republican incumbent Reid Ribble, who had represented the 8th district since 2011, announced on January 30, 2016, that he would retire at the end of his third term, opening the seat for the 2016 election. The district had a PVI of R+2.

=== Republican primary ===
==== Candidates ====
===== Nominee =====
- Mike Gallagher, retired U.S. Marine and former advisor to Governor Scott Walker

===== Eliminated in primary =====
- Frank Lasee, state senator from the 1st district (2011–2017)
- Terry McNulty, Forestville, Wisconsin village president, Southern Door School Board member

===== Withdrawn =====
- Gary Schomburg, former Hilbert village board member

===== Declined =====
- Andre Jacque, state representative from the 2nd district (2011–2019)
- John Macco, state representative from the 88th district (2015–present)
- John Nygren, state representative from the 89th district (2007–2020)
- Roger Roth, state senator from the 19th district (2015–2023) and nephew of former U.S. representative Toby Roth
- David Steffen, state representative from the 4th district (2015–present)
- Jim Steineke, Majority Leader of State Assembly (2015–2022) and state representative from the 5th district (2011–2022)
- Chad Weininger, former state representative from the 4th district (2011–2015)

==== Endorsements ====
Mike Gallagher

U.S. Representatives

- Reid Ribble, 8th District incumbent

State legislators

- Al Ott, state representative

Organizations

- Pro-Life Wisconsin Victory Fund
- Midwest Growth PAC

Individuals

- John R. Bolton, former ambassador to the United Nations
- Michael T. Flynn, retired Lieutenant General and former Director of the Defense Intelligence Agency
- Carl Higbie, former Navy SEAL
Terry McNulty

Organizations

- Pro-Life Wisconsin Victory Fund (co-endorsement with Gallagher)
Frank Lasee

Organizations

- Wisconsin Family Action PAC

==== Results ====
Republican primary results
Party	Candidate	Votes	%
Republican	Mike Gallagher	40,322	74.5
Republican	Frank Lasee	10,705	19.8
Republican	Terry McNulty	3,109	5.7
Republican	Write-ins	16	0.0
Total votes		54,152	100.0

=== Democratic primary ===
==== Candidates ====
===== Nominee =====
- Tom Nelson, County Executive of Outagamie County and former state representative

===== Declined =====
- Penny Bernard Schaber, former state representative
- Eric Genrich, state representative
- Steve Kagen, former U.S. Representative
- Jamie Wall, businessman, nominee for this seat in 2012 and candidate in 2006

==== Results ====
Democratic primary results
Party	Candidate	Votes	%
Democratic	Tom Nelson	20,914	99.9
Democratic	Write-ins	28	0.1
Total votes		20,942	100.0

=== Independent ===
- Wendy Gribben, part-time grocery store employee
- Robbie Hoffman, artist and psychologist

=== General election ===
==== Polling ====
Poll source	Date(s) administered	Sample size	Margin of error	Mike Gallagher (R)	Tom Nelson (D)	Undecided
NMB Research	October 16–18, 2016	400	± 4.9%	52%	41%	17%
Public Opinion Strategies (R)	August 22, 2016	400	± 4.9%	52%	36%	12%

==== Predictions ====
Source	Ranking	As of
The Cook Political Report	Likely R	November 7, 2016
Daily Kos Elections	Lean R	November 7, 2016
Rothenberg	Likely R	November 3, 2016
Sabato's Crystal Ball	Lean R	November 7, 2016
RCP	Lean R	October 31, 2016

==== Results ====
Wisconsin's 8th congressional district, 2016
Party	Candidate	Votes	%
Republican	Mike Gallagher	227,892	62.6
Democratic	Tom Nelson	135,682	37.3
Green	Wendy Gribben (write-in)	16	0.0
Democratic	Jerry Kobishop (write-in)	2	0.0
n/a	Write-ins	188	0.1
Total votes		363,280	100.0
Republican hold			
