= 2023 Outagamie County Executive election =

- April 4, 2023
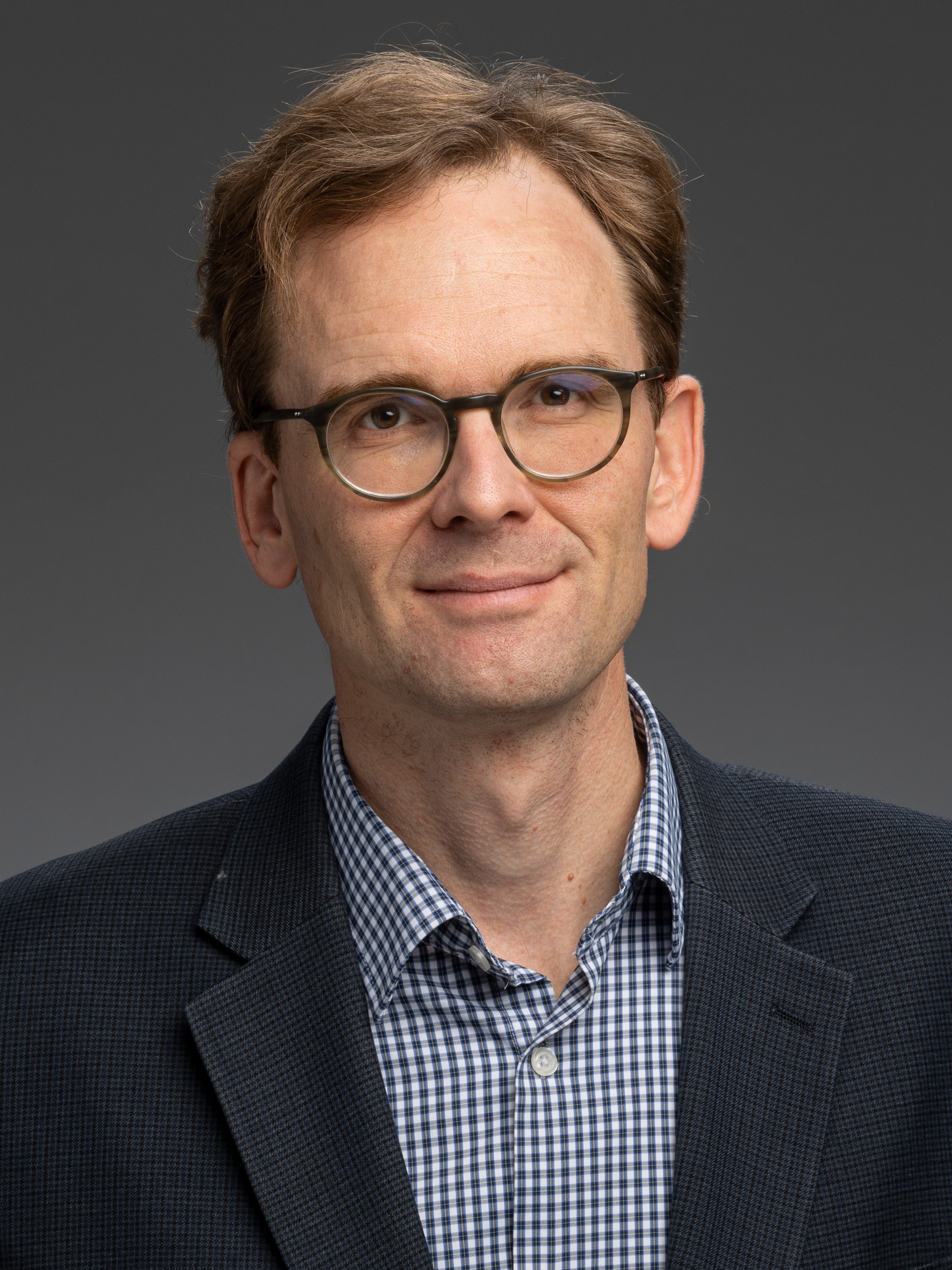

Nominee	Tom Nelson	Kevin Sturn
Party	Nonpartisan	Nonpartisan
Popular vote	28,815	23,018
Percentage	55.59%	44.41%
County Executive before election
Tom Nelson
Nonpartisan
Elected County Executive
Tom Nelson
Nonpartisan

The 2023 Outagamie County Executive election took place on April 1, 2023, following a primary election on February 18, 2023, to select the County Executive of Outagamie County, Wisconsin. Incumbent County Executive Tom Nelson, who had been unopposed for re-election in 2015 and 2019, ran for re-election to his fourth term. He was challenged by two opponents: County Supervisor Justin Krueger, and former County Supervisor Kevin Sturn. In the primary election, Nelson placed first, winning 52 percent of the vote, and Sturn placed second with 30 percent, advancing to the general election against Nelson.

In the general election, Nelson campaigned on his record as County Executive, and pointed to his success in stabilizing the county budget and the growth of the Appleton International Airport. Sturn attacked Nelson for being away from the job while he ran for the U.S. Senate in 2022, and argued that he was responsible, as finance chair of the County Board of Supervisors, for the county's financial strength.

Nelson ultimately defeated Sturn by a wide margin, winning re-election with 56 percent of the vote.

== Primary election ==
=== Candidates ===
- Tom Nelson, incumbent County Executive
- Kevin Sturn, former County Supervisor
- Justin Krueger, former County Supervisor

=== Results ===
Primary election
Party	Candidate	Votes	%
Nonpartisan	Tom Nelson (inc.)	14,472	52.19%
Nonpartisan	Kevin Sturn	8,274	29.84%
Nonpartisan	Justin Krueger	4,981	17.96%
Total votes		27,727	100.00%

== General election ==
=== Results ===
2023 Outagamie County Executive election
Party	Candidate	Votes	%
Nonpartisan	Tom Nelson (inc.)	28,815	55.59%
Nonpartisan	Kevin Sturn	23,018	44.41%
Total votes		51,833	100.00%
