= Gary Schmidt =

Gary Schmidt may refer to:

- Gary D. Schmidt (born 1957), American children's writer
- Gary J. Schmidt (born 1947), former member of the Wisconsin State Assembly

== See also ==
- Gary Schmitt (born 1952), American political activist
