= Becky Weber =

American politician (born 1954)

Member of the Wisconsin State Assembly from the 5th district
- In office January 6, 2003 – January 3, 2005
- Preceded by: Lee Meyerhofer
- Succeeded by: Tom Nelson

Personal details
- Born: September 24, 1954 (age 71) Green Bay, Wisconsin
- Party: Republican

Becky Weber (born September 24, 1954) is an American small business owner and Republican politician from the U.S. state of Wisconsin. She served one term in the Wisconsin State Assembly (2003–2005) representing Wisconsin's 5th Assembly district.

== Background ==
Born in Green Bay, Weber graduated from Bay Port High School in 1972; attended Northeast Wisconsin Technical College; the University of Wisconsin-Green Bay; and the University of Oklahoma Retail Lending School. She was self-employed in restaurant development and as an insurance agent, owned a printing and office supply store, and was a bank officer.

== Public office ==
Weber, who had previously served on the Green Bay Plan Commission, was elected to the Wisconsin State Assembly's 5th District (northeastern Outagamie County and the Town of Maple Grove) in 2002, unseating incumbent Democrat Lee Meyerhofer with 8621 votes to Meyerhofer's 7909, and was assigned to the standing committees on aging and long-term care; budget review; government operations and spending limitations; insurance; rural affairs; and small business. She was defeated for reelection in 2004 by Democrat Tom Nelson, who received 15,014 votes to her 14,249.

== Personal life ==
She is Catholic; as of 2004 she was married and had two children.

Wisconsin State Assembly
Preceded by Lee Meyerhofer	Member of the Wisconsin State Assembly from the 5th district January 6, 2003 – January 3, 2005	Succeeded by Tom Nelson
