= Joy Goeben =

21st century American politician

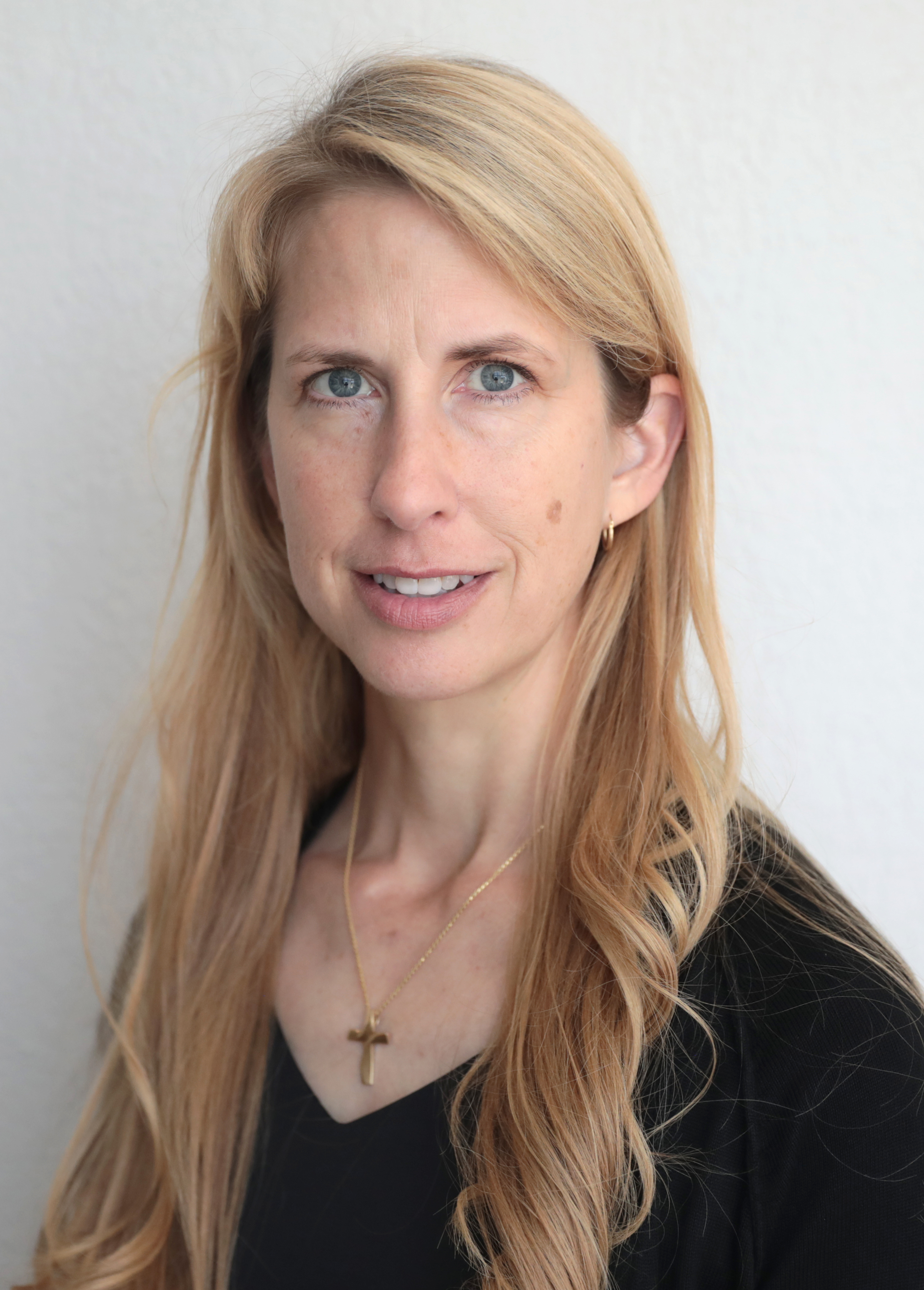
- Goeben in 2022

Member of the Wisconsin State Assembly from the 5th district
- Incumbent
- Assumed office January 3, 2023
- Preceded by: Jim Steineke

Personal details
- Born: October 16, 1972 (age 53) Green Bay, Wisconsin, U.S.
- Party: Republican
- Spouse: Ben
- Children: 4
- Education: University of Wisconsin–Green Bay (BS); Walden University (MS)
- Website: Campaign website

Joy L. Goeben (born October 16, 1972) is an American teacher, business owner, and Republican politician from Brown County, Wisconsin. She is a member of the Wisconsin State Assembly, representing Wisconsin's 5th Assembly district since January 2023.

== Biography ==
Joy Goeben was born and raised in Green Bay, Wisconsin. She graduated from Green Bay East High School and then earned her bachelor's degree in education from the University of Wisconsin–Green Bay, and completed her master's in education at Walden University.

She then went to work as a teacher in the Ashwaubenon, Wisconsin, public school system. Later, she opened the Joyful Hearts Family Childcare preschool center, which she operated for ten years. She also assists her husband in the management of their family business, Classic Carpet Cleaning. She is a member of the board of Christ Alone Church Leadership, and has also been a member of the board of the non-profit Green Bay Area Christian Homeschoolers.

== Political career ==
In the summer of 2022, Wisconsin State Assembly incumbent Jim Steineke resigned from office, leaving a vacancy in the 5th Assembly district. Goeben decided to enter the race for the Republican nomination, and defeated two opponents in the August 2022 Republican primary. She defeated Democrat Joseph Van Deurzen in the general election.

Goeben is currently the Chair of the Wisconsin State Assembly Environment Committee and the vice-chair of the Education Committee. Additionally, she serves on the Children and Families Committee, the Housing and Real Estate Committee, the Committee for Jobs and the Economy, and the Regulatory Licensing Reform Committee. Goeben's work in the Assembly has focused around education, family rights and services, and child protection. She is adamantly Pro-Life.

== Personal life and family ==
Goeben and her husband, Ben, reside in Hobart, Wisconsin. They have four children. One of her children is currently serving in the United States Army.

== Electoral history ==
=== Wisconsin Assembly (2022, 2024) ===
Year	Election	Date	Elected				Defeated				Total	Plurality
2022	Primary	Aug. 9	Joy Goeben	Republican	3,153	53.70%	Tim Greenwood	Rep.	2,166	36.89%	5,871	987
2022	Primary	Aug. 9	Joy Goeben	Republican	3,153	53.70%	Kraig Knaack	Rep.	548	9.33%	5,871	987
2022	General	Nov. 8	Joy Goeben	Republican	15,280	59.83%	Joseph Van Deurzen	Dem.	10,258	40.17%	25,538	5,022
2024	General	Nov. 5	Joy Goeben (inc)	Republican	22,041	62.77%	Greg Sampson	Dem.	13,063	37.21%	35,110	8,978

Wisconsin State Assembly
Preceded by Jim Steineke	Member of the Wisconsin State Assembly from the 5th district January 3, 2023 – present	Incumbent
