= Khary Penebaker =

American businessman and political candidate

- Born: October 22, 1977 (age 48); Cincinnati, Ohio, U.S.
- Education: University of Wisconsin–Milwaukee (BA)
- Political party: Democratic

Khary D. Penebaker (/kərˈiːˈpɛnibeɪkər/ kə-REE PEN-ee-bay-kər; born October 22, 1977) is an American businessman, political candidate, and former representative to the Democratic National Committee.

== Personal life ==
Penebaker was born in Cincinnati, Ohio in 1977. Penebaker's mother Joyce committed suicide by self-inflicted gunshot on September 9, 1979. He graduated from Marquette University High School in 1996 and received a degree in marketing from the University of Wisconsin–Milwaukee in 2001, where he was a successful athlete in track and field.

== Career ==
Penebaker is an American businessman and entrepreneur in the roofing industry. He has received industry awards such as 2004 Supplier of the Year Award from the Wisconsin Supplier Development Council, Madison FAAIR Award Recipient (Focused Affirmative Action Initiative and Results); Recognizing Accomplishments in Workforce Diversity (2010) and the 2010 Minority Business Contractor of the Year Award from Wisconsin's Daily Reporter. He has volunteered as a spokesperson for several crime and safety-oriented organizations, including Moms Demand Action and Everytown for Gun Safety, and he is a strong advocate for suicide prevention.

=== 2016 US Congressional campaign ===
As a member of the Democratic Party, Penebaker ran for the United States House of Representatives in Wisconsin's 5th congressional district. The district includes the entirety of Washington and Jefferson counties, and portions of Waukesha, Dodge, Milwaukee, and Walworth counties. Penebaker faced Republican incumbent Jim Sensenbrenner. Penebaker lost to Sensenbrenner, receiving 29.29% of the vote to Sensenbrenner's 66.7%, with 390,844 votes cast.

Wisconsin's 5th Congressional District Election, 2016
Party	Candidate	Votes	%	±%
General Election, November 8, 2016
Republican	F. James Sensenbrenner (inc.)	260,706	66.70%	−2.75%
Democratic	Khary Penebaker	114,477	29.29%	−1.11%
Libertarian	John Arndt	15,324	3.92%	
	Scattering	337	0.09%	
Plurality		146,229	37.41%	-1.64%
Total votes		390,844	100.0%	+17.43%
Republican hold				

=== Gun ownership background checks ===
Penebaker is an advocate for universal background checks for gun sales, including private and online sales. According to Penebaker, coordinating the federal, state, and local governments with healthcare professionals and insurance providers to establish better long-term mental health care for those who need it. During his campaign, Penebaker pushed to model federal legislation off Wisconsin's recently passed bipartisan domestic violence law, the SAFE Act, to keep guns away from domestic abusers. Penebaker also pushed for firearm restrictions for suspected persons on the federal no-fly list and other terror watch lists, while supporting an appeal process in case a name has been added to such lists in error.

=== DNC Representative ===
Penebaker was elected as a Representative to the Democratic National Committee in a June 2017 Special Election. He succeeded fellow Democrat Jason Rae who was appointed Secretary of the Democratic National Committee. Penebaker stepped down June 2023, he was succeeded by Alex Lasry.
