= William N. Vander Loop =

American politician (1932–2021)

Member of the Wisconsin State Assembly from the 5th district
- In office January 7, 1991 – January 4, 1999
- Preceded by: Gary J. Schmidt
- Succeeded by: Lee Meyerhofer

Personal details
- Born: December 6, 1932 Little Chute, Wisconsin, U.S.
- Died: December 28, 2021 (aged 89)
- Party: Democratic

William N. Vander Loop (December 6, 1932 – December 28, 2021) was an American politician who was a member of the Wisconsin State Assembly for the 5th District.

== Background ==
During the Korean War, he served in the United States Army. He was married with five children. Vander Loop died at home on December 28, 2021, at the age of 89.

== Political career ==
Vander Loop was first elected to the Assembly in 1990. Additionally, he was a Kaukauna, Wisconsin, alderman from 1983 to 1991. He was a Democrat.
