= Anne Horak Gallagher =

American actress

- Born: Anne Horak; May 5, 1984 (age 41); De Pere, Wisconsin, U.S.
- Education: University of Michigan (BFA)
- Occupations: Actress; singer; dancer
- Years active: 2006–present
- Spouse: Mike Gallagher (m. 2019)
- Children: 2

Anne Horak Gallagher (born May 5, 1984) is an American stage, television and film actress, known best for performing in Broadway theatre productions of Chicago—as Roxie Hart and in Irving Berlin's White Christmas—as Rita.

== Early life ==
Anne Horak Gallagher was born in De Pere, Wisconsin, to Richard Horak, an orthopedic surgeon, and his wife Ellen. She attended high school at Notre Dame Academy in Green Bay taking lead roles in school musicals such as Crazy for You. She went on to complete a Bachelor of Fine Arts at the University of Michigan.

== Career ==
Having performed in the Toronto production of Irving Berlin's White Christmas, Horak made her Broadway debut as Rita in the 2008 production of the musical directed by Tony Award winner Walter Bobbie. She went on to tour the country as Inga in Mel Brooks' Young Frankenstein directed by Susan Stroman. In 2013 she performed in the Broadway production of Chicago as Mona, later taking over the role of Roxie Hart, both on Broadway and the subsequent national and international tours.

In 2017 she played Patsy in MCP's 25th Anniversary Concert of Crazy for You at Lincoln Center's David Geffen Hall. Later that year, also at Lincoln Center, she played Clo-Clo in the Metropolitan Opera's production of The Merry Widow. Both were directed by Susan Stroman. In 2018 she performed in a concert version of On the Town with Boston Pops directed by Kathleen Marshall. She has performed in musicals across the United States, some of which include the roles of Gretchen in Boeing-Boeing at Paper Mill Playhouse Sheila in A Chorus Line at Lexington Opera House and Charity in Sweet Charity at the Marriott Theatre where Chicago Tribune reviewed her performance as “beautifully acted—assertive, vulnerable and richly connected—and courageously danced.”

Horak has performed in roles on film, such as Martin Scorsese's The Irishman and in TV series, such as Forever, Submissions Only, Royal Pains, A Gifted Man and Law & Order: Special Victims Unit. She has also appeared, as herself, in a 2014 episode of Keeping Up with the Kardashians.

== Personal life ==
In September 2019, Horak married U.S. Representative Mike Gallagher, taking the name Anne Horak Gallagher. They have two daughters.

== Credits ==
=== Stage ===
| Year | Title | Role | |
|---|---|---|---|
| 2019 | South Pacific (Omaha, NE) | Nellie Forbush | OWH |
| 2018 | Sweet Charity (Lincolnshire, IL) | Charity Hope Valentine | Chicago Tribune |
| 2018 | A Chorus Line (Lexington, KY) | Sheila Bryant | About the Artists |
| 2018 | On the Town (Boston, MA) | Ensemble | Playbill |
| 2017 | The Merry Widow (New York, NY) | Clo-Clo | MetOpera Db |
| 2017 | The Most Beautiful Room in New York (New Haven, CT) | Natasha/Franca | Variety |
| 2017 | Crazy for You (New York, NY) | Patsy | Playbill |
| 2016 | Oklahoma! (Wichita, KS) | Laurey Williams | About the Artists |
| 2016 | Nice Work If You Can Get It (Wichita, KS) | Billie Bendix | Wichita Eagle |
| 2016 | My Paris (New Haven, CT) | May Milton | New York Times |
| 2015 | Diner (Wilmington, DE) | Carol Heathrow | About the Artists |
| 2015 | Company (New Hope, PA) | April | About the Artists |
| 2013-2014 | Chicago (Broadway + Tour) | Roxie Hart | Playbill |
| 2013-2014 | Chicago (Broadway) | Mona | Playbill |
| 2012 | Crazy for You (Sacramento, CA) | Polly Baker | News Review |
| 2012 | Legally Blonde (Wichita, KS) | Elle Woods | Playbill |
| 2012 | Singin' in the Rain (Wichita, KS) | Lina Lamont | About the Artists |
| 2012 | Steel Magnolias (Raleigh, NC) | Shelby | About the Artists |
| 2012 | Boeing-Boeing (Milburn, NJ) | Gretchen | New York Times |
| 2011 | Anything Goes (Taipei, Taiwan) | Hope Harcourt | Taipei Times |
| 2011 | Curtains (Houston TX/ Millburn, NJ) | Bambi Bernstein | New York Times |
| 2009-2010 | Young Frankenstein (National Tour) | Inga | Playbill |
| 2009 | Music in the Air (New York, NY) | Hulde | About the Artists |
| 2008-2009 | Irving Berlin's White Christmas (Broadway) | Rita | IBDB |
| 2008 | Oklahoma! (Milburn, NJ) | Ensemble | About the Artists |
| 2008 | All Shook Up (Wichita, KS) | Natalie | Wichita Eagle |
| 2007 | Lone Star Love (Seattle, WA) | Ensemble | Playbill |
| 2006 | Thoroughly Modern Millie (Wichita, KS) | Miss Dorothy Brown | MTI |
| 2006 | Grease (Pittsburgh, PA) | Ensemble | About the Artists |
| 2006 | 42nd Street (Pittsburgh, PA) | Ensemble / Phyllis Dale | About the Artists |
| 2006 | Beauty and the Beast (Pittsburgh, PA) | Ensemble | Post Gazette |

=== Film and television ===
| Year | Title | Role | |
|---|---|---|---|
| 2019 | The Irishman | Golddigger Dancer | IMDb |
| 2015 | Forever | Hannah Dalford | IMDb |
| 2015 | Eye Candy | Emily | IMDb |
| 2009 | Royal Pains | Summer Stark | IMDb |
| 2011 | A Gifted Man | Gina Drake | IMDb |
| 2011 | Law & Order: SVU | Stewardess | IMDb |
| 2014 | Submissions Only | Kathleen | IMDb |
