= Mike Gallagher (American politician) =

American politician (born 1984)

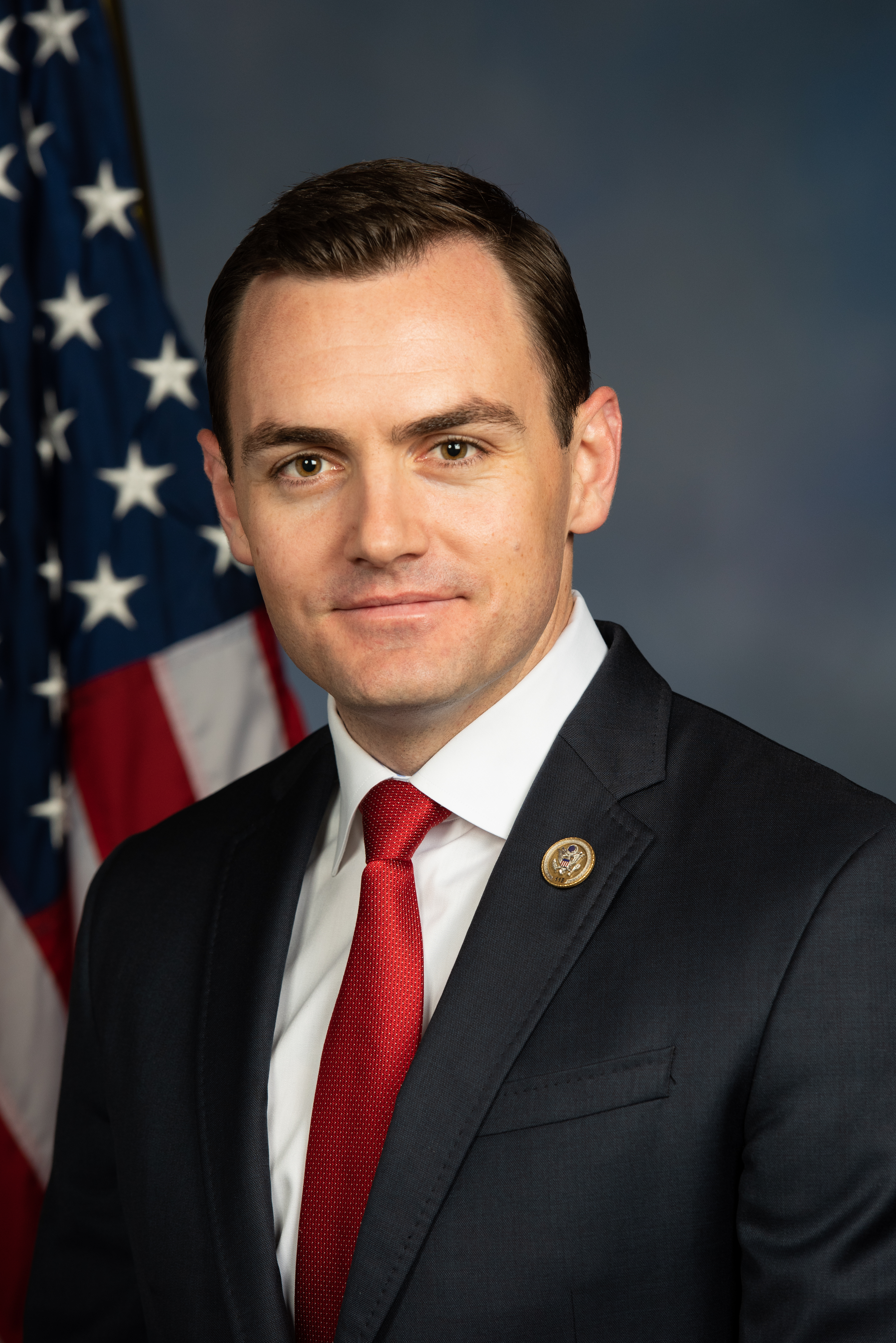
- Official portrait, 2018

Chair of the House Committee on the Chinese Communist Party
- In office January 10, 2023 – April 24, 2024
- Preceded by: Position established
- Succeeded by: John Moolenaar

Member of the U.S. House of Representatives from Wisconsin's 8th district
- In office January 3, 2017 – April 24, 2024
- Preceded by: Reid Ribble
- Succeeded by: Tony Wied

Personal details
- Born: Michael John Gallagher; March 3, 1984 (age 42) Green Bay, Wisconsin, U.S.
- Party: Republican
- Spouse: Anne Horak (m. 2019)
- Children: 2
- Education: Princeton University (BA); National Intelligence University (MS); Georgetown University (MA, PhD)
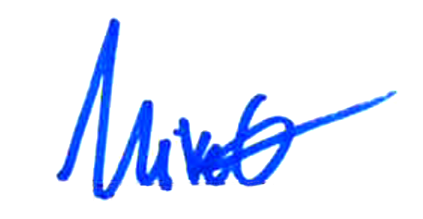
- Signature

Military service
- Branch/service: United States Marine Corps
- Years of service: 2006–2013
- Rank: Captain
- Unit: 1st Intelligence Battalion
- Battles/wars: Iraq War
- Gallagher's voice Gallagher supporting the establishment of the House Select Committee on the CCP. Recorded January 10, 2023

Michael John Gallagher (born March 3, 1984) is an American foreign policy advisor and Republican politician from Brown County, Wisconsin. He served four terms in the United States House of Representatives, representing Wisconsin's 8th congressional district from 2017 until his resignation in April 2024. (Note: Mike Gallagher submitted his resignation to be effective on April 20, 2024, but it did not become official until April 24, 2024.)

While serving in the 118th United States Congress, Gallagher was the chairman of the House Select Committee on Competition with the Chinese Communist Party. He was a decisive vote against the impeachment of Homeland Security secretary Alejandro Mayorkas in February 2024, resulting in outrage directed against him from some members of his party. Days later, Gallagher announced he would not run for a fifth term in Congress. A month later, he announced he would not finish his term, and would resign effective April 19, 2024. He later moved his resignation to April 20, 2024, so he could vote in favor of aid to Ukraine, Israel, and Taiwan. Regional press reported that Gallagher would be taking a role with TitletownTech, a venture capital firm backed by Microsoft and the Green Bay Packers.

Before his election to Congress, Gallagher served as a military intelligence officer for seven years, including overseas deployments in the Iraq War, and worked as committee staff on the U.S. Senate Foreign Relations Committee. He is married to Broadway actress Anne Horak Gallagher.

== Early life ==
=== Education ===
Gallagher lived in Green Bay through middle school. After his parents' divorce, he moved to California and studied at Mater Dei High School in Santa Ana, while spending summers in Wisconsin. Gallagher later said his teachers "endowed me with a love for history and set me on a path to earning a Ph.D. focusing on Cold War history." He graduated in 2002 as valedictorian.

Gallagher earned his B.A. in 2006 from the Woodrow Wilson School of Public and International Affairs at Princeton University. With a growing interest in global security, he changed his major from Spanish to Arabic. Gallagher completed a 117-page senior thesis, "New Approaches to Asymmetric Threats in the Middle East: From Fighting to Winning", under the supervision of Frederick Hitz. At this time he completed a summer internship abroad with the RAND Europe (UK) CIC in Cambridge, United Kingdom, working on a strategic study of terrorist groups such as Basque separatists.

Gallagher served his first tour of duty in the Iraq War with the United States Marine Corps. Subsequently, Gallagher began a MSSI (Master of Science in Strategic Intelligence) at National Intelligence University and graduated in 2010.

Gallagher completed a second M.A. in security studies at Georgetown University in 2012. He then began doctoral studies, writing a dissertation on the administrations of Harry S. Truman and Dwight D. Eisenhower and the Cold War, receiving his Ph.D. in government and international relations in 2015. His dissertation committee was chaired by Andy Bennett and included Keir A Lieber and Colin Dueck.

=== Military ===
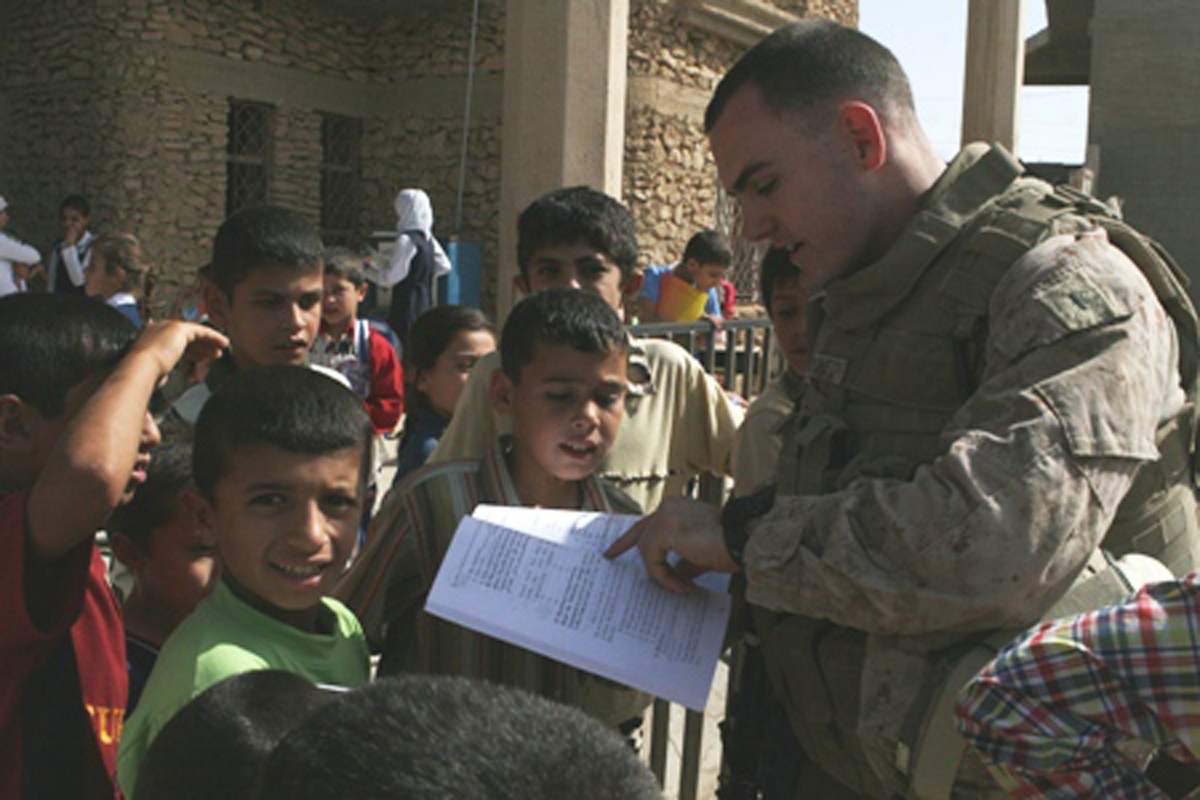
1st Lt. Mike Gallagher reading a book to children at Al Moaine Elementary School in Rawah, Iraq, 13 October 2008

Gallagher was an intelligence officer in the United States Marine Corps, serving seven years (2006–13) on active duty. He twice deployed to the Al Anbar Province, Iraq, serving on General David Petraeus's CENTCOM Assessment Team, both as a commander of intelligence teams in Al-Qa'im near the Syrian border.

His first deployment was in November 2007 to lead a counterintelligence and human intelligence team, a time when al-Qaeda appeared to have been defeated by the Iraq War troop surge of 2007; giving "some semblance of stability in the town." He made a back-to-back deployment from 2008, taking over from a team led by Matt Pottinger. He assessed American military strategy in the Middle East and Central Asia in his role as a counterintelligence officer, and as a member of the CENTCOM assessment team.

In an interview with The American Interest, Gallagher was very critical of the Obama administration's subsequent drawdown of United States troops from Iraq, because:

"... all the predictions we made at the time about creating a vacuum and how dangerous that was proved to be true. And I think the broader regional policy in the Obama Administration of seeking accommodation with the Iranian regime in the hopes that this would produce what the President referred to as a new equilibrium in the region produced exactly the opposite: disequilibrium.

== U.S. House of Representatives ==
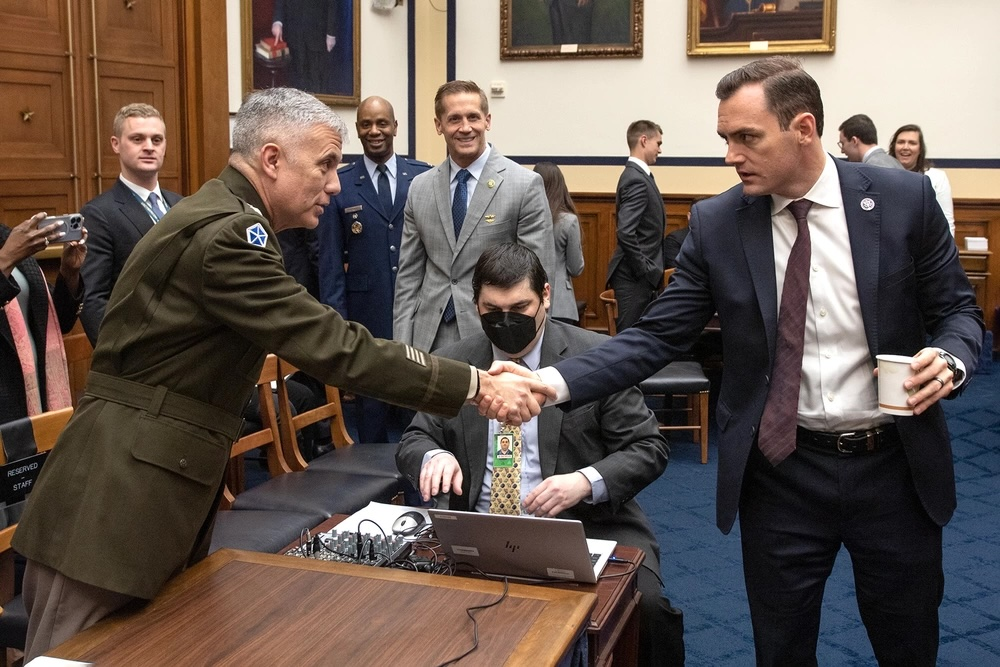
As chairman of the House Armed Services Committee subcommittee for cyber programs, Representative Mike Gallagher greets Army Gen Paul Nakasone, March 2023

=== Elections ===
Gallagher served as a Republican staffer on the United States Senate Committee on Foreign Relations. Governor of Wisconsin Scott Walker hired him as a foreign policy advisor in February 2015, in preparation for his 2016 presidential campaign.

After Walker dropped out of the presidential race, Gallagher worked as a senior marketing strategist for Breakthrough Fuel, a supply-chain management company. He then ran for Wisconsin's 8th congressional district seat, to which Reid Ribble was not seeking reelection. Hailing from Brown County, Wisconsin, he won the district which comprises much of the northeast quadrant of the state of Wisconsin, including the city of Green Bay, having contended against Wisconsin state senator Frank Lasee and Forestville village president Terry McNulty.

In the general election, Gallagher defeated Outagamie County Executive Tom Nelson, 63% to 36%. He was reelected in 2018 over Brown County assistant district attorney Beau Liegeois.

=== Tenure ===
Gallagher voted in line with President Donald Trump's position 93.8% of the time in the 115th Congress and 84.2% of the time in the 116th Congress, but broke with the White House on issues such as the Trump's firing of FBI Director James Comey and Trump's denial of Russian interference in the 2016 elections. He voted against the majority of his party about 8.7% of the time.

In 2018, Gallagher argued that power in the House of Representatives was too concentrated in the leadership; he proposed allowing committee members to choose their own chairs and ranking members, rather than having these positions be selected by the parties' steering committees. This proposal was rejected in a House Republican vote. Gallagher also argued for consolidating the appropriating and authorizing House committees and a reform of the House calendar that would have the chamber sit "at least five days a week for three consecutive weeks, then spend a full week back in their districts" (a change from the current congressional practice of very short legislative workweeks and frequent long weekends allowing members more time in their districts). His unsuccessful reform proposals were praised by Norm Ornstein, a scholar of Congress, as "constructive" although unlikely to be adopted.

==== Health care and public health ====
In 2017, he called the ACA "unsustainable".

During the COVID-19 pandemic in Wisconsin, Gallagher's district had some of the nation's highest infection rates. He did not take a position on the Wisconsin state legislature's lawsuit seeking to invalidate Governor Tony Evers's directive to mandate the wearing of masks in public as a way to combat the transmission of the virus.

==== Foreign affairs ====
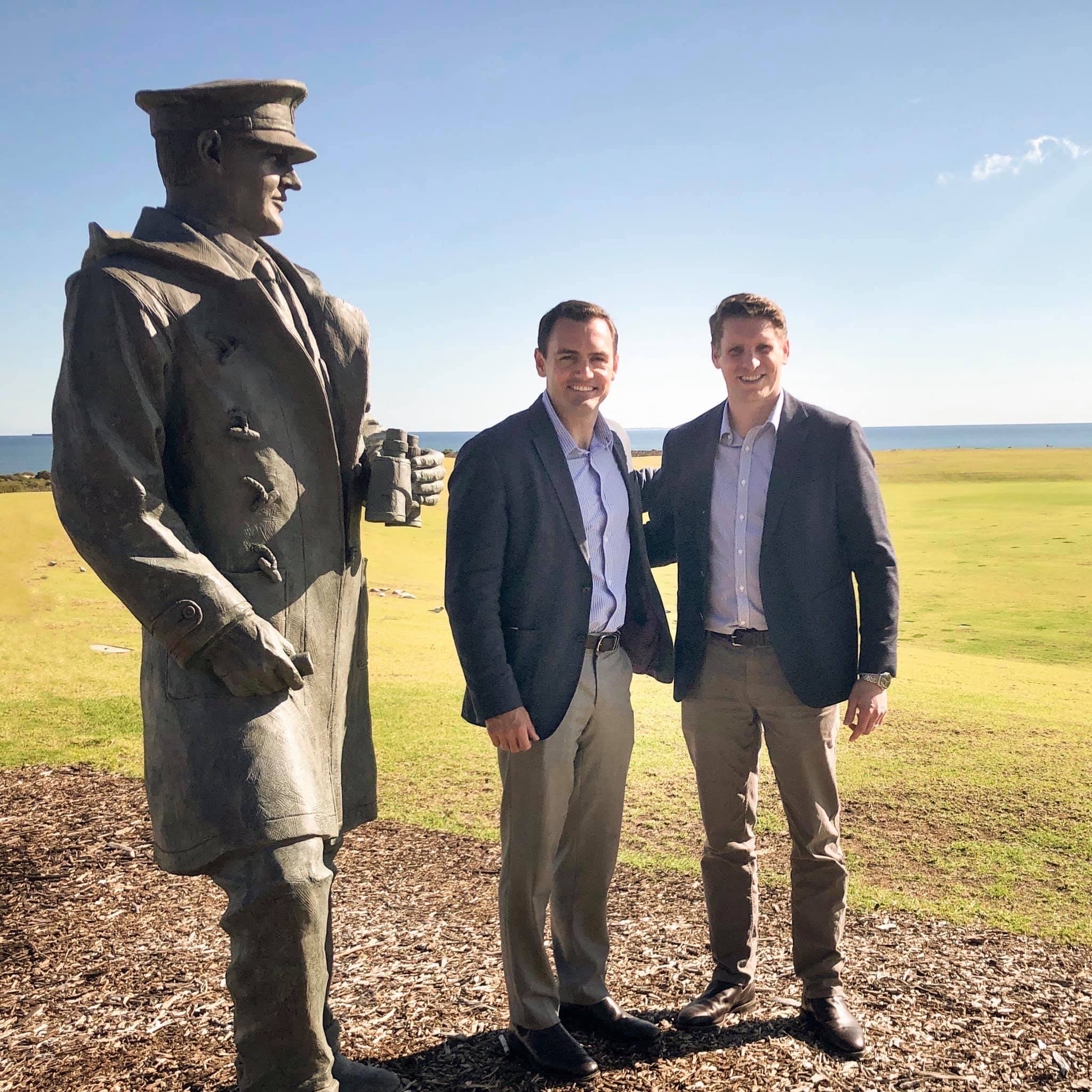
Mike Gallagher with Australian MP Andrew Hastie by a statue of Sir David Stirling, the founder of the Special Air Service, at Campbell Barracks in Western Australia in August 2019

In a 2016 profile in the Green Bay Press Gazette, Gallagher blamed President Barack Obama and former Secretary of State Hillary Clinton for the success of ISIS in Iraq. In 2019, he wrote it would be "a smart geopolitical move" for the U.S. to buy Greenland, a notion that Trump floated. In 2017, he supported a U.S. airstrike in Syria in retaliation for the Khan Shaykhun chemical attack, and in 2020 he supported the U.S. drone strike that targeted Iranian general Qasem Soleimani.

In 2019, after American video game company Activision Blizzard punished a Hong Kong-based professional gamer for supporting pro-democracy Hong Kong protests, Gallagher accused Blizzard of censorship. He co-signed a letter to Activision Blizzard CEO Bobby Kotick that read, "As China amplifies its campaign of intimidation, you and your company must decide whether to look beyond the bottom line and promote American values—like freedom of speech and thought—or to give in to Beijing’s demands in order to preserve market access."

In 2020, Gallagher and Tom Cotton drafted a bill banning federal agencies, such as the departments of the Health and Human Services, Veterans Affairs, and Defense, from purchasing drugs manufactured in China.

In June 2021, Gallagher was one of 49 House Republicans to vote to repeal the AUMF (Authorization for Use of Military Force) against Iraq.

During the Russo-Ukrainian War, Gallagher signed a letter advocating for President Biden to give F-16 fighter jets to Ukraine.

In February 2023, Gallagher chaired the first public hearing of the Select Committee on China which exposed trade, industrial and security issues such as military arsenal needs for additional Joint Air-to-Surface Standoff Missiles (JASSMs), Long Range Anti-Ship Missiles (LRASMs), Harpoon anti-ship missiles, Tomahawk cruise missiles, and other readiness deficits which require urgent attention in order to deter Chinese aggression in East Asia.

In February 2024, Gallagher led a bipartisan Select Committee on China delegation to Taiwan and met with President Tsai Ing-wen and President-elect Lai Ching-te.

In June 2025, Gallagher spoke at the WORLD.MINDS meeting in Washington DC about China, AI and the transatlantic relationship.

==== Economy ====
Gallagher has supported bipartisan proposals to use industrial policy to counter Chinese economic power; in 2020, he joined Democrats in favor of a proposal to grant $10 billion "to establish regional tech hubs that would aim to create new companies and boost manufacturing." Gallagher has sponsored legislation to bar federal agencies from purchasing Chinese-manufactured drones. In December 2022, he co-sponsored a bill with Marco Rubio to prohibit Chinese and Russian-owned social networking services from conducting business transactions in the U.S. under security grounds.

==== Energy and environment ====
The League of Conservation Voters gave Gallagher a lifetime score of 5%.

==== Social issues ====
He voted against a 2019 resolution which "strongly oppose[d] Trump's ban on transgender members of the Armed Forces." Gallagher voted for the Respect for Marriage Act on December 8, 2022.

==== Other issues ====
Gallagher has been an outspoken critic of the social media platform TikTok, which he describes as "digital fentanyl" because of its allegedly harmful and addictive characteristics. Furthermore, he asserts that TikTok's ties to the Chinese Communist Party may result in the promotion and censorship of various content for propaganda purposes, and he has joined other lawmakers attempting to ban TikTok in the United States. In the wake of the 2023 attack on Israel by Hamas, Gallagher accused TikTok of "intentionally brainwashing" American youth into supporting Hamas, citing the spike in pro-Palestinian content on the platform following the outbreak of hostilities.

In 2018, Gallagher voted against a House resolution condemning Trump for his comments attacking four Democratic congresswomen and saying that they should "go back and help fix the totally broken and crime infested places from which they came". He declined to call Trump's comments racist, but earlier rebuked Trump supporters for "send her back" chants. Gallagher spoke at a Trump rally in Wisconsin in 2019.

In May 2018, after a meeting at the White House, Trump endorsed Gallagher's proposal for congressional term limits; the proposal also received support from Brian Fitzpatrick, Jodey Arrington, and Vicente González. Gallagher's plan consists of limiting senators to two terms and representatives to six terms (12 years each). It would be grandfathered in order not to apply to sitting members of Congress, except the so-called "freshman class".

On January 6, 2021, Gallagher was one of seven Republicans who did not support their colleagues' efforts to challenge the results of the 2020 presidential election. These seven signed a letter that, while giving credence to election fraud allegations made by Trump, said Congress did not have the authority to influence the election's outcome.

During the 2021 storming of the United States Capitol, Gallagher said, "We are witnessing absolute banana republic crap in the United States Capitol right now", and told Trump, "you need to call this off". In May 2021, Gallagher and 174 other House Republicans voted against creating a commission to investigate the storming. He attributed his opposition to a desire to have non-public investigations and wanting "key language preventing interference in the over 400 ongoing criminal prosecutions". As a result, he was given a C− by the Republican Accountability Project.

On January 9, 2021, Gallagher joined a group of other Republican legislators led by Ken Buck of Colorado in signing a letter to President-elect Joe Biden, asking him to formally request that House Speaker Nancy Pelosi halt efforts to impeach Trump.

Gallagher voted to provide Israel with support following the 2023 Hamas attack on Israel.

Gallagher was a surprise vote against the first impeachment vote against Alejandro Mayorkas; the vote was tied for minutes before another Republican changed to allow a reintroduction of the bill in the future.

Asked whether he was worried about backlash in his district for his vote, Gallagher told a small group of reporters: "That can’t be the North Star that guides your votes and guides your principles.”

"I don't live online, guys," he replied when asked if he'd seen feedback on a Wall Street Journal op-ed explaining his vote. "Get offline. It's not healthy for you. I talk to human beings."

==== Resignation ====
Gallagher announced in February 2024 that he would not run for re-election to the House of Representatives. His announcement came amid his outspoken criticism of the House Republican majority's impeachment of Homeland Security secretary Alejandro Mayorkas. He later clarified that he would leave Congress in April.

After his resignation, Gallagher joined the defense contractor Palantir as head of defense. In May 2024, the venture capital group TitletownTech, a joint venture of Microsoft and the Green Bay Packers, announced Gallagher had begun a job at their firm. In his position as strategic advisor, Gallagher is said to identify tech investment opportunities in the Upper Midwest.

On May 21, 2024, the Chinese Ministry of Foreign Affairs announced sanctions over Gallagher, alleging his frequent interference in China's "internal affairs."

=== Committee assignments ===
- Committee on Armed Services
- Committee on Transportation and Infrastructure
- Committee on the Chinese Communist Party (chair)

=== Caucus memberships ===
- Republican Study Committee
- Republican Main Street Partnership
- Climate Solutions Caucus
- U.S.-Japan Caucus
- Problem Solvers Caucus

== Publications ==
=== Articles ===
- Congress must pass measure extending vital Central Pacific agreements, The Hill, February 20, 2024

== Personal life ==
Gallagher married Broadway actress Anne Horak in September 2019. They have two daughters, born in June 2020 and August 2022.

Gallagher is Catholic.

Gallagher has won the title of "fastest man in Congress" in the ACLI Capital Challenge (a three-mile race for individuals working in all branches of government and the media) every year since first taking part in 2017, most recently finishing with a time of 19:57 in 2023.

== Electoral history ==
=== U.S. House (2016–2022) ===
Year	Election	Date	Elected				Defeated				Total	Plurality
2016	Primary	Sep. 9	Mike Gallagher	Republican	40,322	74.46%	Frank Lasee	Rep.	10,705	19.77%	54,152	29,617
2016	Primary	Sep. 9	Mike Gallagher	Republican	40,322	74.46%	Terry McNulty	Rep.	3,109	5.74%	54,152	29,617
2016	General	Nov. 8	Mike Gallagher	Republican	227,892	62.65%	Tom Nelson	Dem.	135,682	37.30%	363,780	92,210
2018	General	Nov. 6	Mike Gallagher (inc)	Republican	209,410	63.69%	Beau Liegeois	Dem.	119,265	36.28%	328,774	90,145
2020	General	Nov. 3	Mike Gallagher (inc)	Republican	268,173	64.18%	Amanda Stuck	Dem.	149,558	35.79%	417,838	118,615
2022	Primary	Aug. 9	Mike Gallagher (inc)	Republican	79,096	84.55%	Shaun Clarmont	Rep.	14,377	15.37%	93,549	64,719
2022	General	Nov. 8	Mike Gallagher (inc)	Republican	223,981	72.21%	Paul David Boucher	Ind.	48,896	15.76%	310,196	175,085
2022	General	Nov. 8	Mike Gallagher (inc)	Republican	223,981	72.21%	Jacob J. VandenPlas	Lib.	32,057	10.33%	310,196	175,085
2022	General	Nov. 8	Mike Gallagher (inc)	Republican	223,981	72.21%	Julie Hancock (write-in)	Dem.	3,160	1.02%	310,196	175,085
2022	General	Nov. 8	Mike Gallagher (inc)	Republican	223,981	72.21%	Robbie Hoffman (write-in)	Dem.	135	0.04%	310,196	175,085

== Notes ==
U.S. House of Representatives
Preceded by Reid Ribble	Member of the U.S. House of Representatives from Wisconsin's 8th congressional district 2017–2024	Succeeded by Tony Wied
New office	Chair of the House Chinese Communist Party Committee; 2023–2024	Succeeded by John Moolenaar
U.S. order of precedence (ceremonial)
Preceded by Reid Ribble as Former U.S. Representative	Order of precedence of the United States as Former U.S. Representative	Succeeded by Yvonne Brathwaite Burke as Former U.S. Representative
