= Lee Meyerhofer =

American politician

Member of the Wisconsin State Assembly from the 5th district
- In office January 4, 1999 – January 6, 2003
- Preceded by: William N. Vander Loop
- Succeeded by: Becky Weber

Personal details
- Born: June 11, 1964 (age 62) Kaukauna, Wisconsin
- Party: Democratic

Lee Meyerhofer (born June 11, 1964) is a former member of the Wisconsin State Assembly for the 5th District.

== Biography ==
Meyerhofer was born on June 11, 1964, in Kaukauna, Wisconsin. He graduated from Kaukauna High School and Fox Valley Technical College. Meyerhofer is married with two children.

== Career ==
Meyerhofer was first elected to the Assembly for District 5 in 1998. In 2002, he was defeated for re-election by Becky Weber. He has also been a member of the Kaukauna City Council since 1992. Meyerhofer is a Democrat.
