= United States House Select Committee on Strategic Competition between the United States and the Chinese Communist Party =

Current US House of Representatives committee

Select committee
- United States House of Representatives; 119th Congress

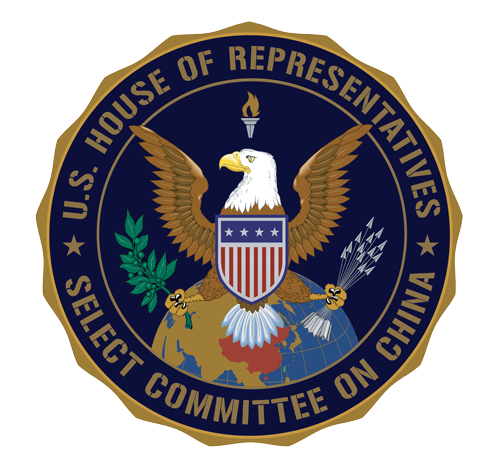
- Logo of the Committee

History
- Status: Active
- Formed: January 10, 2023

Leadership
- Chair: John Moolenaar (R); Since April 20, 2024
- Ranking Member: Ro Khanna (D); Since January 5, 2026

Structure
- Political parties: Majority (13): Republican (13); Minority (11): Democratic (11)

Jurisdiction
- Purpose: "policy recommendations on countering the economic, technological, security, and ideological threats of the Chinese Communist Party (CCP) to the United States and allies and partners of the United States."
- Policy areas: United States–China relations; United States–Taiwan relations; Chinese espionage in the US; Cyberwarfare and China; Intellectual property theft by China; Territorial disputes in the South China Sea; Human rights in China

Website
- selectcommitteeontheccp.house.gov (Republican) democrats-selectcommitteeontheccp.house.gov (Democratic)

The United States House Select Committee on Strategic Competition between the United States and the Chinese Communist Party (Note: officially abbreviated as the Select Committee on the CCP; sometimes called the House Select Committee on China) is a select committee of the United States House of Representatives established in the 118th Congress, on January 10, 2023. The committee focuses on American economic and security competition with the People's Republic of China, and its ruling party, the Chinese Communist Party (CCP). The committee is chaired by Representative John Moolenaar of Michigan, a member of the Republican Party, and the ranking member is Ro Khanna of California, a Democrat.

== History ==
In 2020, during the 116th Congress, House Minority Leader Kevin McCarthy tried to create a bipartisan China panel with Speaker Nancy Pelosi, and Democrats withdrew from the effort. A Republican-led China Task Force later emerged under Foreign Affairs Committee ranking member Michael McCaul which, though partisan in nature, introduced hundreds of policy proposals with often robust bipartisan support. It also worked with the country's de facto diplomatic mission in Washington to advance U.S. military aid to Taiwan. The task force produced a wide-ranging and partly classified report in September 2020.

In October 2022, Rep. Mike Gallagher of Wisconsin told reporters that an independent China committee would "go a long way towards coordinating policy across the many committee jurisdictions and thereby create a more coherent approach to our China policy".

On December 8, 2022, Kevin McCarthy, the Republican nominee for the Speaker of the House, unveiled the committee among a slate of efforts to "confront, counter, and respond to" the government of China in an op-ed that argued that the United States was locked in a new Cold War with China:

"To win the new Cold War, we must respond to Chinese aggression with tough policies to strengthen our economy, rebuild our supply chains, speak out for human rights, stand against military aggression, and end the theft of Americans’ personal information, intellectual property, and jobs. We must recognize that China’s "peaceful rise" was pure fiction and finally to confront and respond to the Chinese Communist Party with the urgency the threat demands. To do that, House Republicans will establish a Select Committee on China in the new Congress."

In his response to his appointment as committee chair, Gallagher said:

"The greatest threat to the United States is the Chinese Communist Party. The CCP continues to commit genocide, obscure the origins of the coronavirus pandemic, steal hundreds of billions of dollars worth of American intellectual property, and threaten Taiwan. The Select Committee on China will push back in bipartisan fashion before it’s too late."

In an op-ed on FoxNews.com, the two described the committee as the starting point for a holistic government approach that would build on the efforts of the previous Republican-led China Task Force and "ensure America is prepared to tackle the economic and security challenges posed by the CCP."

In December 2022, The Hill reported that the committee was likely to focus not only on international affairs but also topics of concern regarding the influence of the Chinese Communist Party within the United States, including large purchases of American agricultural lands by Chinese firms, China's human rights issues, and "ideological warfare."

In December 2023, the committee released a set of 150 legislative recommendations to "reset" US economic relations with China.

In 2023, the committee issued a report describing an illegal biolab in Reedley, California, and accused a lab worker and a citizen of China, of "transporting infectious diseases as well as stealing American and Canadian intellectual property". The report also alleged that the Centers for Disease Control and Prevention's (CDC) response had improperly failed to test the samples found in the lab, allegations that the CDC strongly disputed. The Federal Bureau of Investigation closed its investigation, concluding that "there were no weapons of mass destruction on the property".

In March 22, 2024, Gallagher announced that he would leave Congress in April, and Speaker Mike Johnson named Moolenaar to succeed him as chair on March 25.

In January 2026, the Financial Times reported that hackers tied to China's Salt Typhoon campaign had accessed email systems used by some committee staff and by aides on the House Foreign Affairs, Intelligence, and Armed Services committees. The intrusions were detected in December 2025. China denied involvement.

In the winter of 2025–26, a man identifying himself as 'Chris Chen' offered a committee aide $10,000 or more for phone calls every other week about the committee's work and U.S. policy toward China. The aide reported the offer to committee leadership, and the committee concluded that Chen was likely a Chinese intelligence officer or contractor. The New York Times said the episode showed in unusual detail how Chinese intelligence services try to reach sensitive information in Washington.

Following Democratic Party victory in the 2026 House of Representatives elections, questions rose about the future of the committee. Semafor reported that Democrats on the House Foreign Affairs Committee were encouraging party leaders to scrap the committee, arguing other House committees were better positioned to carry its work. House Democratic Caucus leader Hakeem Jeffries said he would discuss the issue with incoming committee leaders.

== Committee leadership ==
=== Chairs ===
Name	Party	State	Start	End
Mike Gallagher	Republican	Wisconsin	2023	2024
John Moolenaar	Republican	Michigan	2024	present

=== Ranking Members ===
Name	Party	State	Start	End
Raja Krishnamoorthi	Democratic	Illinois	2023	2026
Ro Khanna	Democratic	California	2026	present

== Members, 119th Congress ==
Majority	Minority
John Moolenaar, Michigan, Chair; Rob Wittman, Virginia; Andy Barr, Kentucky; Dan Newhouse, Washington; Darin LaHood, Illinois; Neal Dunn, Florida; Dusty Johnson, South Dakota; Ashley Hinson, Iowa; Carlos Giménez, Florida; Gus Bilirakis, Florida; Young Kim, California; Nathaniel Moran, Texas; Zach Nunn, Iowa	Ro Khanna, California, Ranking Member (from January 5, 2026); Raja Krishnamoorthi, Illinois, Ranking Member (until January 5, 2026); Kathy Castor, Florida; Andre Carson, Indiana; Seth Moulton, Massachusetts; Mikie Sherrill, New Jersey (until November 20, 2025); Haley Stevens, Michigan; Tom Suozzi, New York (from June 2026); Ritchie Torres, New York; Shontel Brown, Ohio; Greg Stanton, Arizona; Jill Tokuda, Hawaii

== See also ==
- United States-China Economic and Security Review Commission
- Congressional-Executive Commission on China
- Cox Report
- Inter-Parliamentary Alliance on China
