= Gary J. Schmidt =

American politician

Member of the Wisconsin State Assembly from the 5th district
- In office January 7, 1985 – January 7, 1991
- Preceded by: Betty Jo Nelsen
- Succeeded by: William N. Vander Loop

Personal details
- Born: January 26, 1947 (age 79) Kaukauna, Wisconsin
- Party: Republican

Gary J. Schmidt (born January 26, 1947) is a former member of the Wisconsin State Assembly for the 5th District.

Schmidt was born in Kaukauna, Wisconsin. He graduated from a high school in Oneida, Wisconsin before attending the Saint Paul Seminary School of Divinity, the William Mitchell College of Law and Minnesota State University, Mankato. During the Vietnam War era, Schmidt served in the United States Marine Corps. He is married and has three children.

== Political career ==
Schmidt was first elected to the Assembly in 1984. Additionally, he was a member of the Kaukauna Area School Board from 1984 to 1987. He is a Republican.
