= Jim Steineke =

American Republican politician (born 1970)

Majority Leader of the Wisconsin Assembly
- In office January 5, 2015 – July 27, 2022
- Preceded by: Patricia Strachota
- Succeeded by: Tyler August

Member of the Wisconsin State Assembly from the 5th district
- In office January 3, 2011 – July 27, 2022
- Preceded by: Tom Nelson
- Succeeded by: Joy Goeben

Personal details
- Born: November 23, 1970 (age 55) Milwaukee, Wisconsin, U.S.
- Party: Republican
- Education: University of Wisconsin–Milwaukee; University of Wisconsin–Oshkosh
- Website: Official website

James Steineke (born November 23, 1970) is a Wisconsin real estate agent and Republican politician from Kaukauna, Wisconsin. He was the majority leader of the Wisconsin State Assembly from January 2015 until his resignation from the Assembly in July 2022. He had represented Wisconsin's 5th Assembly district since 2011.

== Early life and career ==
Born in Milwaukee, Wisconsin, Steineke attended the University of Wisconsin–Oshkosh and the University of Wisconsin–Milwaukee. He worked as a realtor.

== Public office ==
He was a member of the board of supervisors for the town of Vandenbroek from 2005 to 2007, and was chairman of the town board from 2007 to 2011. He also served on the Outagamie County board of supervisors from 2006 to 2011.

Steineke was elected to the Wisconsin State Assembly in 2010 in the Wisconsin's 5th Assembly district, which then comprised much of eastern Outagamie County, the Town of Maple Grove in Shawano County, and part of western Brown County. He succeeded Democrat Tom Nelson, who had decline running for re-election to seek election as lieutenant governor. He has identified himself as a proponent of limited government and lower taxes.

In November 2020, Steineke was re-elected as the Assembly Majority Leader by his GOP colleagues.

In March 2021, Steineke applauded the conservative majority on the Wisconsin Supreme Court for preventing Governor Tony Evers from extending a face mask mandate intended to halt the spread of the coronavirus.

In January 2022, Steineke announced he would not run for re-election in 2022. After announcing his retirement, he denounced the 2020 election review recommendations of Michael Gableman, saying that Gableman's suggestion that the legislature could "decertify the 2020 election" "would be the end of our republic as we know it."

Wisconsin State Assembly
Preceded by Patricia Strachota	Majority Leader of the Wisconsin Assembly; 2015–2022	Succeeded by Tyler August
