= Tom Nelson (Wisconsin politician) =

American politician (born 1976)

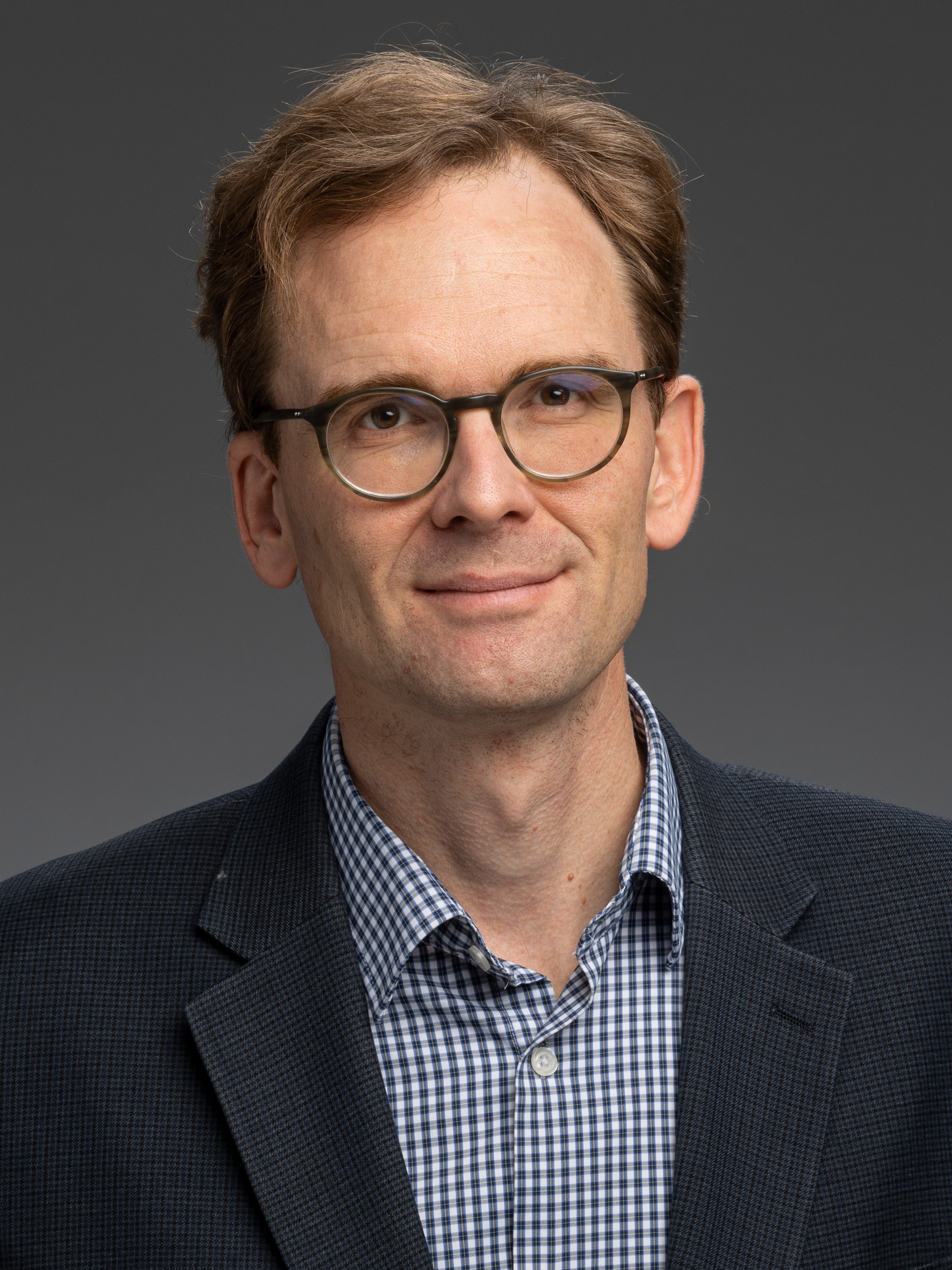
- Nelson in 2020

County Executive of Outagamie County
- Incumbent
- Assumed office April 19, 2011
- Preceded by: Toby Paltzer

Majority Leader of the Wisconsin Assembly
- In office January 5, 2009 – January 3, 2011
- Preceded by: Jeff Fitzgerald
- Succeeded by: Scott Suder

Member of the Wisconsin State Assembly from the 5th district
- In office January 3, 2005 – January 3, 2011
- Preceded by: Becky Weber
- Succeeded by: Jim Steineke

Personal details
- Born: March 3, 1976 (age 50) St. Paul, Minnesota, U.S.
- Party: Democratic
- Spouse: Maria Heim
- Children: 2
- Education: Carleton College (BA); Princeton University (MPA)
- Website: Campaign website

Thomas M. Nelson (born March 3, 1976) is an American public administrator and politician serving as the county executive of Outagamie County, Wisconsin, since 2011. A member of the Democratic Party, Nelson previously served in the Wisconsin State Assembly for six years, and was the Democratic majority leader for the 2009–2010 session. He was a candidate in the 2022 Democratic primary election for the United States Senate, he withdrew from the race in late July and endorsed Mandela Barnes.

Nelson was an unsuccessful candidate for United States House of Representatives in 2016 and for lieutenant governor in 2010.

== Early life and education ==
Nelson was born in Saint Paul, Minnesota, on March 3, 1976, to Steven and Marjorie Nelson. He spent his early years in Stockholm, Wisconsin, as his father moved around the state as a Lutheran Pastor At age four, he moved with his family to Combined Locks, Wisconsin, just outside of Appleton, where his father started Christ the King Lutheran Church. Nelson graduated valedictorian from Little Chute High School in 1994 and went on to earn his bachelor's degree from Carleton College in 1998. He later received his MPA from Princeton University in 2004.

== Political career ==
Nelson is a former member of the Wisconsin State Assembly representing the 5th Assembly district (northeastern Outagamie County, western Brown County, and Maple Grove in Shawano County) from 2005 to 2011. He was first elected to the Assembly in 2004, defeating Republican incumbent Becky Weber 51 percent to 49 percent. He was the only Democrat to unseat an incumbent Republican in the Wisconsin legislative elections of 2004. When he took office on January 3, 2005, he was the youngest member of the state Assembly. Nelson was assigned to the standing committees on health, insurance, rural development and transportation.

At the start of the 2005-06 session, Nelson was viewed as a top target in the 2006 election but GOP failed to recruit a strong challenger. Nelson defeated Jim Reigel of Hobart 62 percent to 38 percent. Nelson sought reelection again in 2008, beating Jim Steineke 64 percent to 34 percent. Members of the Assembly Democratic caucus elected him Majority Leader on November 12, 2008, for the 2009–2010 session.

=== SeniorCare ===
In the spring of 2007, the state of Wisconsin did not receive a waiver from the Centers for Medicare & Medicaid Services (CMS) to continue SeniorCare, an affordable prescription drug program for low-income elderly. Without a wavier the state would no longer have the authority nor the funding to continue the program. At the time, approximately 104,000 were enrolled in the program.

Nelson organized a grassroots effort to save the program and lobbied for it in Washington, DC. In May 2007, Senator Herb Kohl and Russ Feingold authored an amendment to emergency spending bill for the Iraq War to renew the waiver, which effectively saved the program and extended it through 2009. Nelson along with other state leaders was credited with having successfully lobbied officials to continue the program.

He continued to work on this issue for the rest of his time in the legislature and as county executive. Again in 2015, the program’s future was uncertain because Governor Scott Walker did not fund SeniorCare in the 2015-2017 biennial budget. “SeniorCare is good policy then, and its good policy now,” County Executive Nelson told a press conference in February of that year, referring to the ordeal of 2007. Approximately 2700 residents of Outagamie County were enrolled in the program. In May, the Joint Finance Committee which consists of members of both houses of the legislature and is responsible for marking up the executive budget, announced it would reject Walker’s proposal and continue funding SeniorCare. Funding remained intact for the rest of the budget process and was adopted as part of the budget in July.

=== Kimberly mill closing ===
In August 2008, Nelson called for a special session of the state Assembly in response to the proposed closing of the Kimberly-NewPage paper mill. The mill employed by 600 workers. It was a particularly important development because NewPage was the largest employer in the village of 6,803 and the country was in the Great Recession and the number of unemployed rose by 592,000 in August alone. Nelson authored a resolution that would call on NewPage to continue running the mill or sell it on the open market. The legislature never convened and the resolution was not adopted. The mill was shut down on September 8 and was bought by Aim Demolition on June 7, 2011 which subsequently tore it down beginning April 2, 2012. Nelson would work on another effort to save a mill later in his service as county executive (see Appleton Coated).

=== 2010 campaign for lieutenant governor ===
In 2010, Nelson announced that he was running for lieutenant governor of Wisconsin, rather than seeking re-election to the Assembly. He gave up his position as Assembly majority leader to help Tom Barrett try to defeat Scott Walker. Mordecai Lee, a UW-Milwaukee political scientist and former state senator said lieutenant governors could affect the outcome of the race. “Normally I would say the lieutenant governor is an afterthought. But this year, with the volatile political climate, the governor’s running mate could end up making a difference.”

Nelson waited until the end of the legislative session to launch his campaign because he wanted to focus on “his legislative responsibilities”. As majority leader he chaired the Rules committee which sets the legislative agenda, specifically which bills would be voted on by the state Assembly. Nelson officially announced his candidacy on May 25, 2010, just over three months before the fall primary on September 14, 2010.

As late as August, Nelson had not yet distinguished himself from the other candidates. Said Jack Craver of Isthmus and frequent commentator on the race that year, "The Democratic primary for lieutenant governor has been a wash so far. It's hard to pinpoint a front-runner, despite assumptions (I plead guilty too) at the beginning of the campaign that Tom Nelson would eventually box-out all of his competition, perhaps with the help of Tom Barrett and the DPW."

On September 14, Nelson won the Democratic nomination in a four-way race, defeating State Senator Spencer Coggs and two others.

During the general election, Republican lieutenant governor nominee Rebecca Kleefisch repeatedly refused Nelson's challenge for a debate. Sitting lieutenant governor and Democrat Barbara Lawton said Nelson and Kleefisch should debate because “it was important for voters to learn about the lieutenant governor candidates since they would take over for the governor should he no longer be able to serve.” The gubernatorial candidates debated three times.

Nelson and running mate Tom Barrett (who ran as a ticket) were defeated in the 2010 general election by Kleefisch and her running mate Scott Walker.

=== Outagamie County executive ===
On April 5, 2011, Nelson defeated former Republican State Treasurer of Wisconsin Jack Voight for county executive of Outagamie County, by roughly 52%–48%, after winning a six-way primary in February. He sought reelection in 2015 and 2019 and was uncontested in each race. On April 4, 2023, Nelson won an unprecedented fourth term by defeating Kevin Sturn, 55-44. Nelson outperformed the Democratic-aligned state supreme court justice candidate Janet Protasiewicz, who won Outagamie County 51-49.

==== Appleton Coated ====
In his second term, Nelson filed an objection in Outagamie County Circuit Court to the sale of Appleton Coated, a paper mill founded in 1889 in the village of Combined Locks to an industrial scrap dealer, Industrial Assets of California. The distressed mill had filed for receivership in August 2017. The United Steelworkers, which represented hourly workers at the mill, also objected. Under Wisconsin receivership law, individuals or entities affected by the sale can object to the sale. At subsequent court hearings, USW and Nelson's case was heard. Their appeal was successful. The presiding judge directed the presumptive new owner, Industrial Assets, to run the plant or find a buyer who would. Industrial Assets chose to run the facility as a going concern and not sell it off as parts and the mill was operational beginning December of that year. The third and final paper machine went online in March of the following year. According to Nelson and company CEO Kyle Putzstuck, it is rare for mills in these situations to continue operating. Nelson's work helping save the mill is the subject of his book, One Day Stronger: How One Union Local Saved a Mill and Changed an Industry -- And What It Means for American Manufacturing.

==== Sales tax ====
At the beginning of his third term in 2019, Nelson opposed the adoption of a county-wide sales tax. Outagamie County was one of just six counties (out of 72) that had not yet implemented a county sales tax, although it had been debating the matter on and off since the 1980s. In June, Nelson vetoed the tax, citing widespread opposition to the measure and that it was a regressive tax that hurt those least able to pay it. The county board overrode his veto and the tax took effect in January 2020. Prior to his veto, Nelson ran a radio ad touting his objection to the sales tax and calling on residents to contact their supervisors. Supervisors demanded Nelson take down his ad, but Nelson demurred, citing his right to run the ads.

=== 2016 U.S. House of Representatives election ===
On April 7, 2016, Nelson announced that he would run for the U.S. Congress seat being vacated by retiring Representative Reid Ribble. The decision was hailed by Democrats across the state because it was viewed as “one move in a complex board game” that could lead to a Democratic takeover of the House of Representatives.

Nelson was recruited by the Democratic Congressional Campaign Committee. The committee reserved $730,000 for its independent expenditure arm and the Super PAC, House Majority PAC, $200,000. Late in the campaign, Nelson made the committee's Red to Blue program, the top-tier races. His opponent in the general election was Republican Mike Gallagher, a former aide to Governor Scott Walker and U.S. Senator Ron Johnson. At the beginning of the general election campaign following the August primary, the race was considered a pure toss-up by the Rothenberg and Gonzalez Political Report. As late as October 24, 2016, Nelson’s race was listed as one of the top 40 US House races likely to flip party control despite the fortunes of congressional Democrats beginning to slip. Nelson was one of the first congressional candidates to use footage of Donald Trump’s Access Hollywood tapes in a campaign ad, linking their opponent to Trump. His ad was featured on The Rachel Maddow Show on October 11, 2016, as an example of the message that would be replicated elsewhere. “The Democratic Party says ads like that will run against congressional Republican candidates all over the country. They`re going to tie every Republican candidate in the country to Trump.”

Nelson was endorsed by Our Revolution, a Bernie Sanders coalition that backed progressive candidates across the country. He also received substantial labor backing with contributions from thirteen labor-PACs, as well as endorsements from the National Committee to Protect Social Security and Medicare and League of Conservation Voters.

Nelson raised about $1.8 million over the course of a seven-month campaign; however, Gallagher raised almost $1 million more ($2.7 million) than Nelson. Outside groups outspent Nelson by a margin of three-to-one compared to his opponent Gallagher.

Nelson would go on to lose the general election to Gallagher, earning 37% of the vote to Gallagher's 63%. Experts frequently noted the role that national headwinds played as Democrats on all levels struggled both in northeast Wisconsin and statewide, though Nelson lagged behind Democratic nominee Hillary Clinton, who received 39% of the vote in the district, while Gallagher outperformed Republican nominee Donald Trump by seven percentage points.

=== 2022 U.S. Senate election ===
On October 20, 2020, Nelson filed with the Federal Election Commission, indicating a run for the U.S. Senate seat in Wisconsin. On October 26, 2020, Nelson formally announced his candidacy. Nelson called on Ron Johnson to resign following the January 6 riot at the U.S. Capitol. A poll released by Nelson's campaign on March 29, 2021, showed Nelson leading Ron Johnson by four points (48%-44%). At the time of the poll, Johnson had not indicated whether he would seek re-election. Nelson withdrew his candidacy on July 29, 2022 and endorsed then-Lieutenant Governor Mandela Barnes. Johnson would go on to defeat Barnes by 1%.

== Political positions ==
During the 2020 Democratic presidential primary, Nelson was a delegate for Bernie Sanders. During the primary, Nelson called on Democratic candidates to be more aggressive in their support for organized labor, noting the role labor unions played in the passage of key components of Franklin D. Roosevelt's New Deal.

Nelson has endorsed raising taxes on the wealthy to fund Social Security. He has praised the Green New Deal, stating that he hopes to forge a "blue-green coalition in the progressive movement, to unite the environmental and labor movements."

He has endorsed Medicare for All, as well as a $15 per hour minimum wage. He also supports a wealth tax. He has also expressed his support for election reform (specifically, the passage of H.R. 1) and the elimination of the filibuster.

== Personal life ==
Nelson is married to Maria Nelson and the couple reside in Appleton, Wisconsin, with their two children. The Nelsons have an interfaith marriage and are members of Christ the King Lutheran Church in Combined Locks, Wisconsin, and St. Therese Catholic Church of Appleton.

Current a candidate for an MA in History through Indiana University's online program, Nelson published Wrecked: The Edmund Fitzgerald and the Sinking of the American Economy in collaboration with Jerald Podair through Michigan State University Press (ISBN 9781611865417). The book links the wreck of the ore freighter SS Edmund Fitzgerald to the decline of the American shipping industry and of industrial manufacturing in the United States. Nelson stated, "“Surprisingly, my book is only the second peer-reviewed work on the Fitzgerald, despite the public’s enduring fascination with the story.... Most existing books focus narrowly on the mystery of the sinking. I go much further, to the legal battles that followed, the corporate practices that preceded it, the poor oversight, and the economic structures that made such a disaster almost inevitable.... What I try to show is how decisions around maintenance, insurance, and crew treatment on the Fitzgerald mirrored what was happening in deindustrializing cities across the Midwest.... In many ways, the ship was a floating example of a declining system—one that undervalued labor and outsourced accountability.”

== Electoral history ==
=== Wisconsin Assembly (2004–2008) ===
Year	Election	Date	Elected				Defeated				Total	Plurality
2004	General	Nov. 2	Tom Nelson	Democratic	15,014	51.28%	Becky Weber (inc.)	Rep.	14,249	48.67%	29,277	765
2006	General	Nov. 7	Tom Nelson (inc.)	Democratic	14,095	62.29%	Jim Reigel	Rep.	8,522	37.66%	22,627	5,573
2008	General	Nov. 4	Tom Nelson (inc.)	Democratic	19,384	64.44%	Jim Steineke	Rep.	10,684	35.52%	30,083	8,700

=== Wisconsin lieutenant governor (2010) ===
Wisconsin Gubernatorial Election, 2010
Party	Candidate	Votes	%	±%
Democratic Lieutenant Governor Primary, September 14, 2010
Democratic	Tom Nelson	108,765	51.84%	
Democratic	Spencer Coggs	43,807	20.88%	
Democratic	James L. Schneider	37,519	17.88%	
Democratic	Henry Sanders	19,387	9.24%	
Write-in		322	0.15%	
Plurality		64,958	30.96%	
Total votes		209,800	100.0%	
General Election, November 2, 2010
Republican	Scott Walker / Rebecca Kleefisch	1,128,941	52.25%	+6.94%
Democratic	Tom Barrett / Tom Nelson	1,004,303	46.48%	−6.22%
Independent	Jim Langer / (no Lieutenant Governor candidate)	10,608	0.49%	
Independent	James James / (no Lieutenant Governor candidate)	8,273	0.38%	
Libertarian	(no Governor candidate) / Terry Virgil	6,790	0.31%	
Write-in		1,915	0.09%	-0.02%
Plurality		124,638	5.77%	-1.62%
Turnout		2,160,830	100.0%	−3.71%
Republican gain from Democratic		Swing	13.16%	

=== Outagamie County executive (2011–present) ===
Year	Election	Date	Elected				Defeated			Total	Plurality
2011	Primary	Feb. 15	Tom Nelson	Nonpartisan	5,215	34.04%	Jack Voight	5,098	33.28%	15,318	117
2011	Primary	Feb. 15	Tom Nelson	Nonpartisan	5,215	34.04%	Michael A. Marsden	1,631	10.65%	15,318	117
2011	Primary	Feb. 15	Tom Nelson	Nonpartisan	5,215	34.04%	Anne Strauch	1,433	9.36%	15,318	117
2011	Primary	Feb. 15	Tom Nelson	Nonpartisan	5,215	34.04%	Michael R. Thomas	1,213	7.92%	15,318	117
2011	Primary	Feb. 15	Tom Nelson	Nonpartisan	5,215	34.04%	Charles Kramer	715	4.67%	15,318	117
2011	General	Apr. 5	Tom Nelson	Nonpartisan	21,972	52.26%	Jack Voight	20,027	47.64%	42,042	1,945
2015	General	Apr. 6	Tom Nelson (inc.)	Nonpartisan	16,033	100.0%				16,033	16,033
2019	General	Apr. 2	Tom Nelson (inc.)	Nonpartisan	26,952	100.0%				26,952	26,952
2023	General	Apr. 4	Tom Nelson (inc.)	Nonpartisan	28,815	55.59%	Kevin M. Sturm	23,018	44.41%	51,833	5,797

=== U.S. House of Representatives (2016) ===
Year	Election	Date	Elected				Defeated				Total	Plurality
2016	General	Nov. 8	Mike Gallagher	Republican	227,892	62.65%	Tom Nelson	Dem.	135,682	37.30%	363,780	92,210

=== U.S. Senate (2022) ===
Year	Election	Date	Elected				Defeated				Total	Plurality
2022	Primary	Aug. 9	Mandela Barnes	Democratic	390,279	77.78%	Alex Lasry (withdrawn)	Dem.	44,609	8.89%	501,760	345,670
2022	Primary	Aug. 9	Mandela Barnes	Democratic	390,279	77.78%	Sarah Godlewski (withdrawn)	Dem.	40,555	8.08%	501,760	345,670
2022	Primary	Aug. 9	Mandela Barnes	Democratic	390,279	77.78%	Tom Nelson (withdrawn)	Dem.	10,995	2.19%	501,760	345,670
2022	Primary	Aug. 9	Mandela Barnes	Democratic	390,279	77.78%	Steven Olikara	Dem.	5,619	1.12%	501,760	345,670
2022	Primary	Aug. 9	Mandela Barnes	Democratic	390,279	77.78%	Darrell Williams	Dem.	3,646	0.73%	501,760	345,670
2022	Primary	Aug. 9	Mandela Barnes	Democratic	390,279	77.78%	Kou C. Lee	Dem.	3,434	0.68%	501,760	345,670
2022	Primary	Aug. 9	Mandela Barnes	Democratic	390,279	77.78%	Peter Peckarsky	Dem.	2,446	0.49%	501,760	345,670

Wisconsin State Assembly
Preceded by Jeff Fitzgerald	Majority Leader of the Wisconsin Assembly; 2009–2011	Succeeded by Scott Suder
Party political offices
Preceded by Barbara Lawton	Democratic nominee for Lieutenant Governor of Wisconsin; 2010	Succeeded by Mahlon Mitchell
Political offices
Preceded by Toby Paltzer	County Executive of Outagamie County; 2011–present	Incumbent
