= Wisconsin's 5th Assembly district =

American legislative district in northeast Wisconsin

Wisconsin's 5th State Assembly district
- 2024 map defined in 2023 Wisc. Act 94; 2022 map defined in Johnson v. Wisconsin Elections Commission; 2011 map was defined in 2011 Wisc. Act 43
Assemblymember
Joy Goeben; R–Hobart
since January 3, 2023 (3 years)
- Demographics: 87.07% White; 1.04% Black; 2.65% Hispanic; 1.92% Asian; 7.2% Native American; 0.09% Hawaiian/Pacific Islander
- Population (2020) • Voting age: 59,076; 44,923
- Website: Official website
- Notes: Northeast Wisconsin

The 5th Assembly district of Wisconsin is one of 99 districts in the Wisconsin State Assembly. Located in northeast Wisconsin, the district comprises parts of eastern Outagamie County and western Brown County, including the city of Seymour, most of the city of Little Chute, and the northern half of Kaukauna. The district also includes all of the Oneida reservation spanning the two counties. The district is represented by Republican Joy Goeben, since January 2023.

The 5th Assembly district is located within Wisconsin's 2nd Senate district, along with the 4th and 6th Assembly districts.

== History ==
The district was created in the 1972 redistricting act (1971 Wisc. Act 304) which first established the numbered district system, replacing the previous system which allocated districts to specific counties. The 5th district was drawn with novel boundaries in southeast Outagamie County and part of southwest Brown County. The majority of the population of the new district came from Appleton suburbs in what had previously been the Outagamie County 3rd district. The last representative of the Outagamie 3rd district, William J. Rogers, was elected as the first representative of the 5th Assembly district in the 1972 election.

Other than the 1982 court ordered redistricting plan, which temporarily moved the 5th district to Milwaukee County, the district has remained in the same vicinity of eastern Outagamie County.

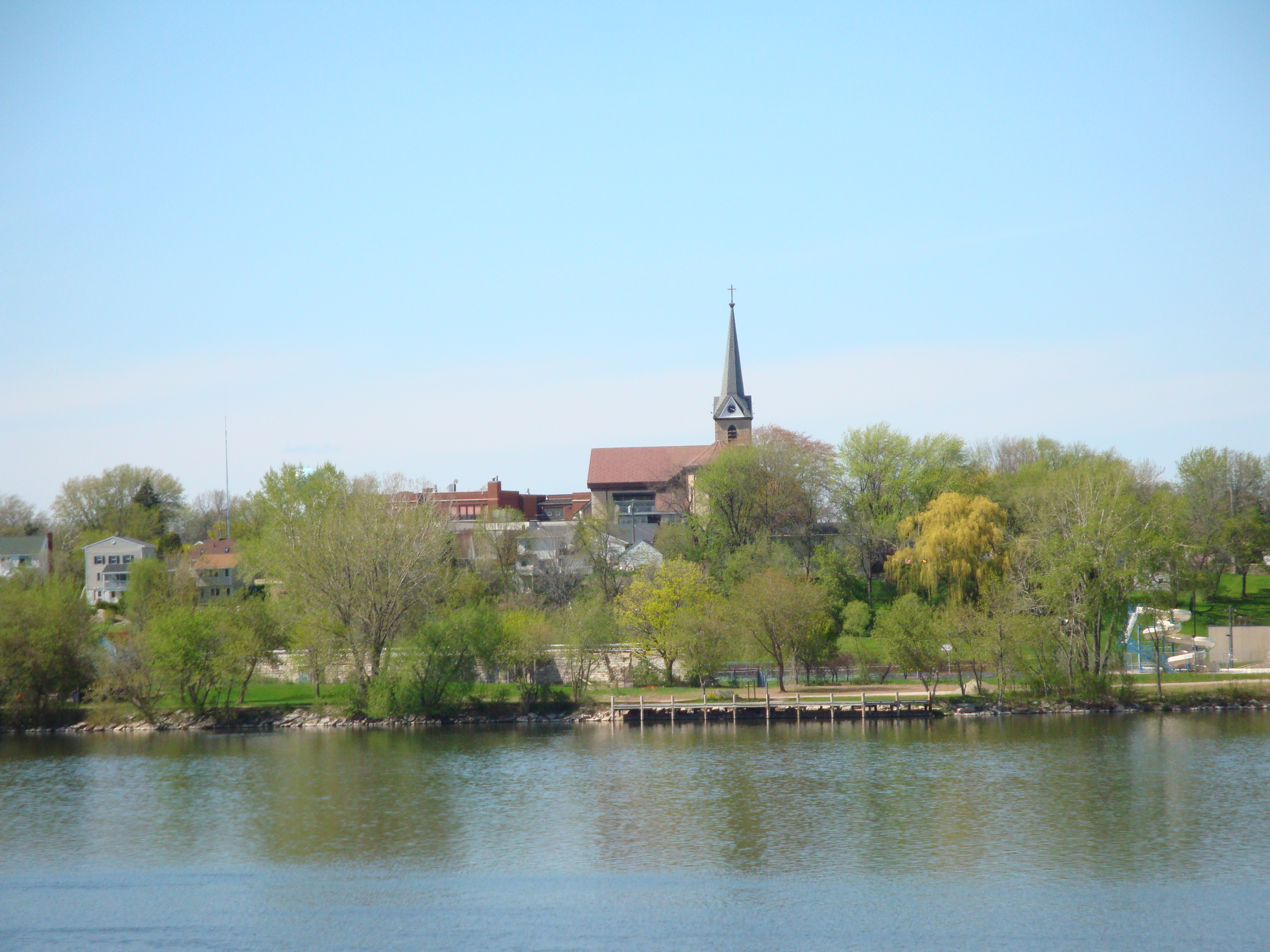
St. John Catholic Church and Island Park in Little Chute

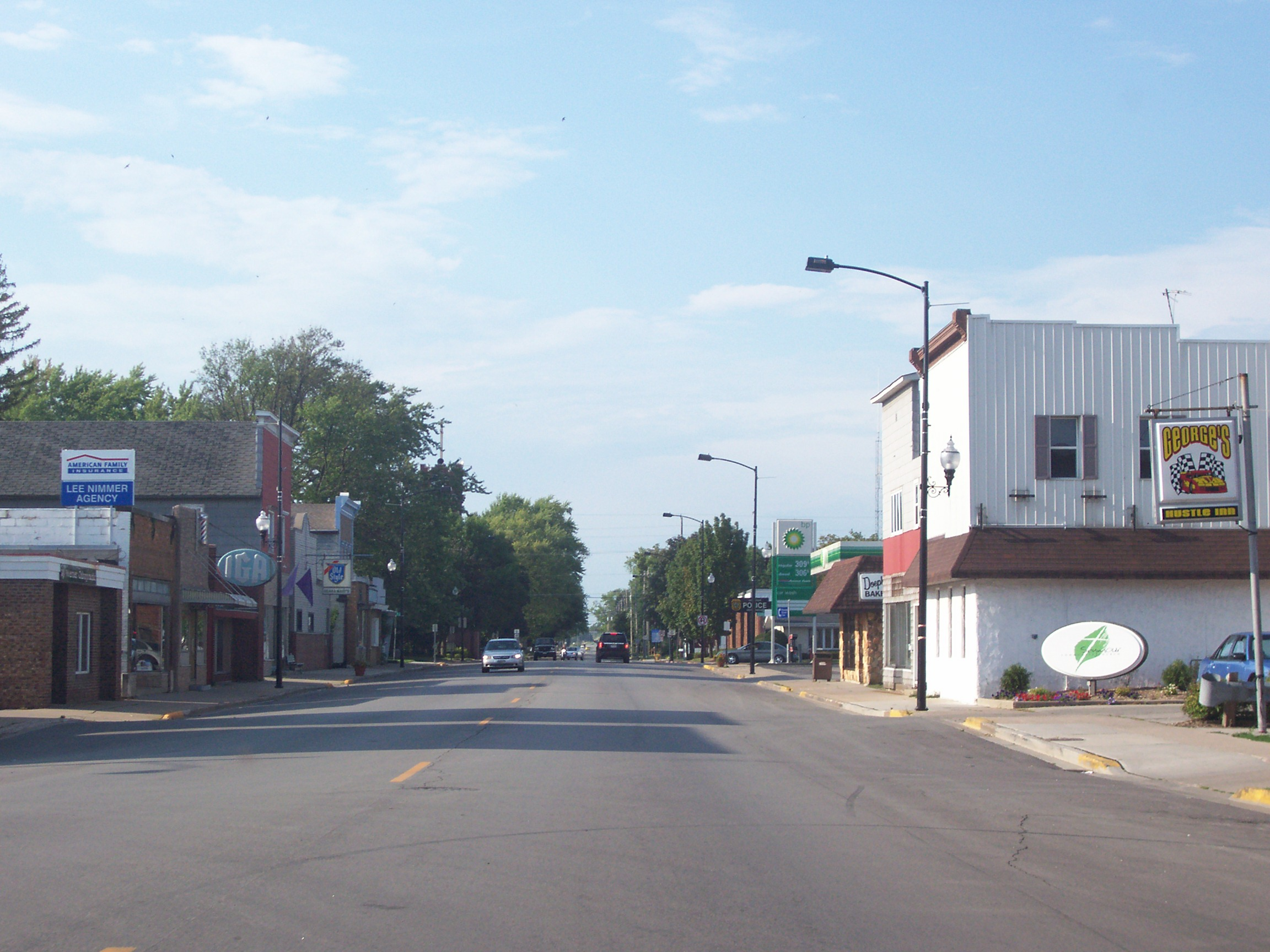
Seymour, Wisconsin

== List of past representatives ==
List of representatives to the Wisconsin State Assembly from the 5th district
Member	Party	Residence	Counties represented	Term start	Term end	Ref.
District created
William J. Rogers	Dem.	Kaukauna	Brown, Outagamie	January 1, 1973	January 3, 1983	
Betty Jo Nelsen	Rep.	Shorewood	Milwaukee	January 3, 1983	January 7, 1985	
Gary J. Schmidt	Rep.	Kaukauna	Brown, Outagamie	January 7, 1985	January 7, 1991	
William N. Vander Loop	Dem.	Kaukauna	Brown, Outagamie	January 7, 1991	January 4, 1999	
Lee Meyerhofer	Dem.	Kaukauna	Brown, Outagamie	January 4, 1999	January 6, 2003	
Becky Weber	Rep.	Green Bay	Brown, Outagamie, Shawano	January 6, 2003	January 3, 2005	
Tom Nelson	Dem.	Kaukauna	Brown, Outagamie, Shawano	January 3, 2005	January 3, 2011	
Jim Steineke	Rep.	Kaukauna	Brown, Outagamie, Shawano	January 3, 2011	July 23, 2022	
Jim Steineke	Rep.	Kaukauna	Brown, Outagamie	January 3, 2011	July 23, 2022	
--Vacant--			Brown, Outagamie	July 23, 2022	January 3, 2023	
Joy Goeben	Rep.	Hobart	Brown, Outagamie	January 3, 2023	Incumbent	
