= 2018 United States House of Representatives elections in Wisconsin =

- November 6, 2018

All 8 Wisconsin seats to the United States House of Representatives
| | Majority party | Minority party |
|---|---|---|
| Party | Republican | Democratic |
| Last election | 5 | 3 |
| Seats won | 5 | 3 |
| Seat change | Steady | Steady |
| Popular vote | 1,172,993 | 1,367,497 |
| Percentage | 45.61% | 53.18% |
| Swing | ▼0.20% | ▲3.42% |

Republican
50–60%
60–70%
70–80%
Democratic
40–50%
50–60%
60–70%
70–80%
90>%

The 2018 United States House of Representatives elections in Wisconsin were held on November 6, 2018, to elect the eight U.S. representatives from the state of Wisconsin, one from each of the state's eight congressional districts. The elections coincided with other elections to the House of Representatives, elections to the United States Senate, and various state and local elections. The Wisconsin partisan primary was held on August 14, 2018, with the governor, U.S. senator, U.S. representative, odd-numbered Wisconsin State Senate seats, and all Wisconsin Assembly seats on the ballot.

Wisconsin was notable for being the only state in which the party that won the popular vote still held a minority of congressional seats in 2018. The Milwaukee Journal Sentinel attributed this to the impact of gerrymandering imposed by the Republican-controlled Wisconsin Legislature in 2011.

== Results summary ==
=== Statewide ===
| Party | Candi- dates | Votes | | Seats | | |
| Party | Candi- dates | No. | % | No. | +/– | % |
|---|---|---|---|---|---|---|
| Democratic Party | 8 | 1,367,492 | 53.18% | 3 | Steady | 37.50% |
| Republican Party | 7 | 1,172,964 | 45.61% | 5 | Steady | 62.50% |
| Independent | 3 | 21,592 | 0.84% | 0 | Steady | 0.00% |
| Write-in | 6 | 49 | 0.00% | 0 | Steady | 0.00% |
| Scattering | | 9,558 | 0.37% | 0 | Steady | 0.00% |
| Total | 24 | 2,571,655 | 100.00% | 8 | Steady | 100.00% |

Popular vote
| Democratic | 53.18% |
| Republican | 45.61% |
| Other | 1.21% |

House seats
| Republican | 62.50% |
| Democratic | 37.50% |

=== District ===
Results of the 2018 United States House of Representatives elections in Wisconsin by district:

| District | Democratic | | Republican | | Others | | Total | | Result |
| District | Votes | % | Votes | % | Votes | % | Votes | % | Result |
|---|---|---|---|---|---|---|---|---|---|
| District 1 | 137,508 | 42.27% | 177,492 | 54.56% | 10,317 | 3.17% | 325,317 | 100.00% | Republican hold |
| District 2 | 309,116 | 97.42% | 0 | 0.00% | 8,179 | 2.58% | 317,295 | 100.00% | Democratic hold |
| District 3 | 187,888 | 59.65% | 126,980 | 40.31% | 121 | 0.04% | 314,989 | 100.00% | Democratic hold |
| District 4 | 206,487 | 75.61% | 59,091 | 21.64% | 7,509 | 2.75% | 273,087 | 100.00% | Democratic hold |
| District 5 | 138,385 | 37.99% | 225,619 | 61.93% | 284 | 0.08% | 364,288 | 100.00% | Republican hold |
| District 6 | 144,536 | 44.46% | 180,311 | 55.47% | 218 | 0.07% | 325,065 | 100.00% | Republican hold |
| District 7 | 124,307 | 38.50% | 194,061 | 60.11% | 4,472 | 1.39% | 322,840 | 100.00% | Republican hold |
| District 8 | 119,265 | 36.28% | 209,410 | 63.69% | 99 | 0.03% | 328,774 | 100.00% | Republican hold |
| Total | 1,367,492 | 53.18% | 1,172,964 | 45.61% | 31,199 | 1.21% | 2,571,655 | 100.00% | |

== District 1 ==
2018 Wisconsin's 1st congressional district election
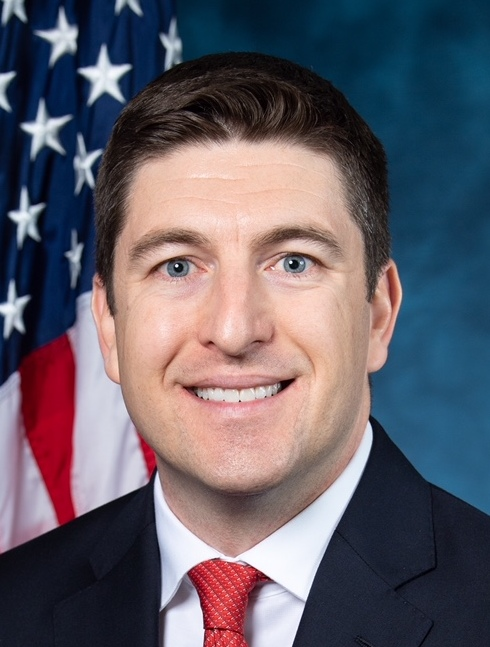

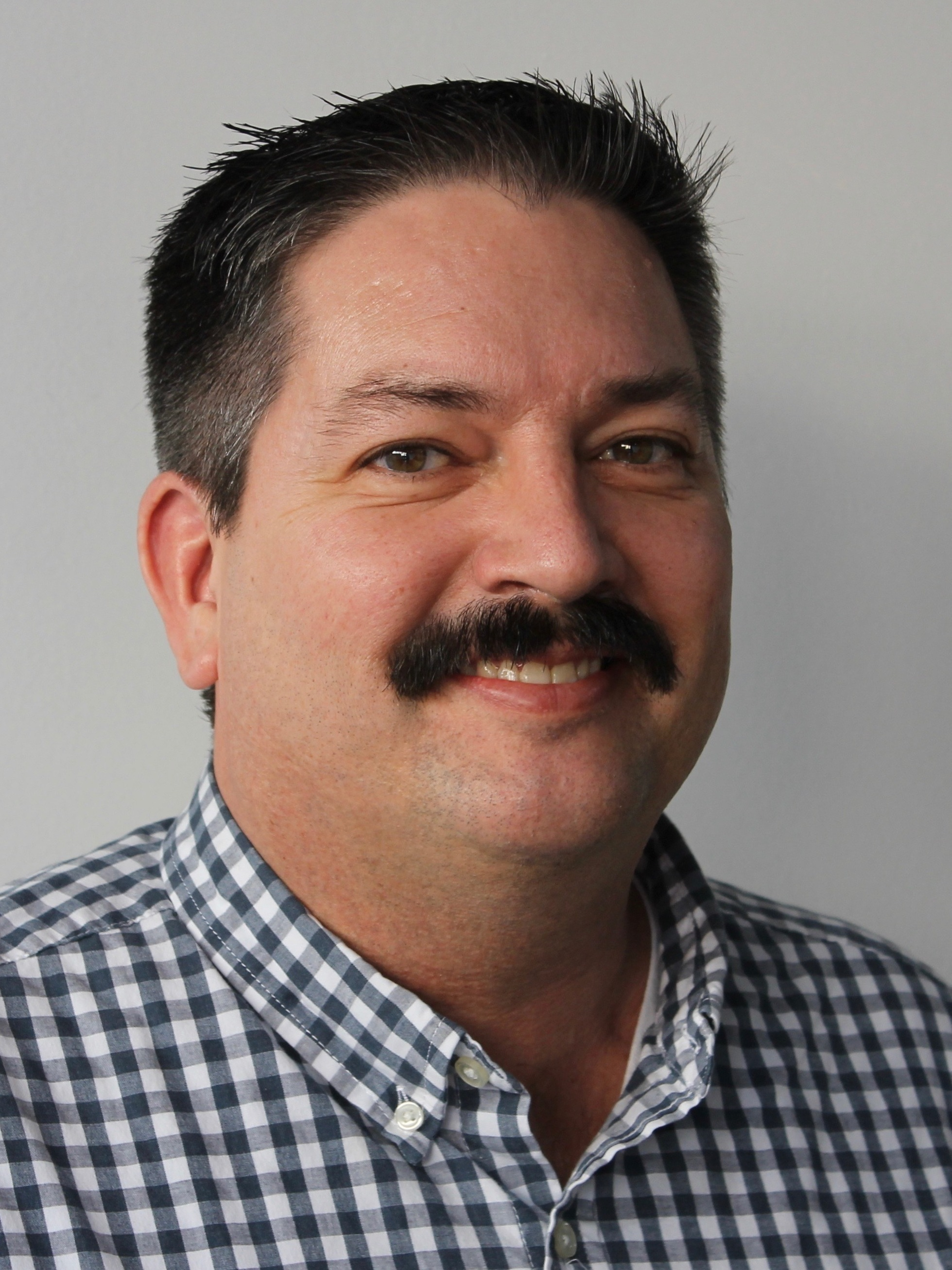
| Nominee | Bryan Steil | Randy Bryce |
| Party | Republican | Democratic |
| Popular vote | 177,492 | 137,508 |
| Percentage | 54.6% | 42.3% |
- Steil: 40–50% 50–60% 60–70% 70–80% >90% Bryce: 40–50% 50–60% 60–70% 70–80% 80–90% >90% Tie: 40–50% 50% No votes
U.S. Representative before election
Paul Ryan
Republican
Elected U.S. Representative
Bryan Steil
Republican

The 1st congressional district is located in southeastern Wisconsin, covering Kenosha County, Racine County and most of Walworth County, as well as portions of Rock County, Waukesha County and Milwaukee County. Incumbent Republican Paul Ryan, Speaker of the House and Republican nominee for vice president in the 2012 who had represented the district since 1999, did not run for re-election. He was re-elected with 65% of the vote in 2016. The district had a PVI of R+5.

=== Republican primary ===
Ryan could potentially have seen a close race; in hypothetical polling, his main Democratic challenger, Randy Bryce, was behind Ryan by only seven points. Ryan was also facing challenges in the Republican primary from Paul Nehlen, who also challenged Ryan in 2016, and from Nick Polce. Ryan announced on April 11, 2018, that he is not seeking re-election. On April 22, Bryan Steil, member of the University of Wisconsin Board of Regents and former personal driver to Ryan, announced his bid for the seat, with news outlets reporting Steil as the Republican Party nominee front-runner.

==== Candidates ====
===== Nominee =====
- Bryan Steil, University of Wisconsin Board of Regents member

===== Eliminated in primary =====
- Paul Nehlen, businessman and white nationalist
- Nick Polce, businessman and former Green Beret
- Jeremy Ryan, activist
- Kevin Adam Steen, applications engineer

===== Withdrew =====
- Brad Boivin, psychologist (endorsed Steil)
- Jeff Wamboldt, county supervisor and police officer

===== Declined =====
- Tyler August, Speaker pro tempore of the Wisconsin State Assembly
- Dave Craig, state senator
- Samantha Kerkman, member of the Wisconsin State Assembly
- Steve Nass, state senator
- Mark Neumann, former U.S. representative and nominee for the U.S. Senate in 1998
- Reince Priebus, former White House Chief of Staff, former chairman of the Republican National Committee and former chairman of the Republican Party of Wisconsin
- Paul Ryan, incumbent U.S. representative and 54th Speaker of the House
- Robin Vos, Speaker of the Wisconsin State Assembly
- Van Wanggaard, state senator

==== Endorsements ====
Paul Nehlen

Individuals

- David Duke, white nationalist, conspiracy theorist, former Ku Klux Klan Grand Wizard, and former Louisiana state representative
Bryan Steil

U.S. representatives

- Sean Duffy, U.S. representative (WI-07)
- Glenn Grothman, U.S. representative (WI-06)
- Paul Ryan, House Speaker
- Jim Sensenbrenner, U.S. representative (WI-05)

Statewide officials

- Tommy Thompson, former governor of Wisconsin

State legislators

- Tyler August, Assembly Speaker pro tempore
- Scott Fitzgerald, Senate Majority Leader
- Mike Kuglitsch, state representative
- Amy Loudenbeck, state representative
- Steve Nass, state senator
- Jessie Rodriguez, state representative
- Ken Skowronski, state representative
- Robin Vos, Assembly Speaker
- Tom Weatherston, state representative

Organizations

- Waukesha Young Republicans
- Wisconsin Right to Life

Newspapers

- Kenosha News

Local officials

- Jonathan Delagrave, Racine County executive
- Paul Farrow, Waukesha County executive

Individuals

- James Bryce, Democratic candidate Randy Bryce's brother
- Reince Priebus, former White House Chief of Staff

==== Primary results ====
Republican primary results
| Party | Candidate | Votes | % |
|---|---|---|---|
| Republican | Bryan Steil | 30,883 | 51.6 |
| Republican | Nick Polce | 8,945 | 14.9 |
| Republican | Paul Nehlen | 6,635 | 11.1 |
| Republican | Kevin Adam Steen | 6,262 | 10.5 |
| Republican | Jeremy Ryan | 6,221 | 10.4 |
| Republican | Brad Boivin | 924 | 1.5 |
| Total votes | | 59,870 | 100.0 |

=== Democratic primary ===
Two Democrats announced; ironworker Randy Bryce and Janesville school board member Cathy Myers.

==== Candidates ====
===== Nominee =====
- Randy Bryce, ironworker, union activist

===== Eliminated in primary =====
- Cathy Myers, Janesville School Board member (endorsed Randy Bryce)

===== Withdrawn =====
- David Yankovich, political writer

===== Declined =====
- Peter Barca, member of the Wisconsin State Assembly and former U.S. representative
- Ryan Solen, Democratic Party of Wisconsin Veteran's Caucus secretary/treasurer and nominee for this seat in 2016

==== Endorsements ====
Randy Bryce

U.S. senators

- Bernie Sanders, U.S. senator from Vermont and 2016 presidential candidate

U.S. representatives from Wisconsin

- Gwen Moore, U.S. representative from Wisconsin's 4th congressional district
- Dave Obey, former U.S. representative from Wisconsin's 7th congressional district
- Mark Pocan, U.S. representative from Wisconsin's 2nd congressional district

U.S. representatives outside of Wisconsin

- Ruben Gallego, U.S. representative from Arizona's 7th congressional district
- Joe Kennedy, U.S. representative from Massachusetts's 4th congressional district
- Barbara Lee, U.S. representative from California's 13th congressional district
- Ted Lieu, U.S. representative from California's 33rd congressional district
- Jan Schakowsky, U.S. representative from Illinois's 9th congressional district
- Adam Schiff, U.S. representative from California's 28th congressional district
- Mark Takano, U.S. representative from California's 41st congressional district

Wisconsin state senators

- Tim Carpenter, Senate District 3
- Chris Larson, Senate District 7
- Robert Wirch, Senate District 22

Wisconsin state representatives

- Mandela Barnes (former), Assembly District 11
- Jonathan Brostoff, Assembly District 19
- David Crowley, Assembly District 17
- Evan Goyke, Assembly District 18
- Greta Neubauer, Assembly District 66
- Tod Ohnstad, Assembly District 65
- Daniel Riemer, Assembly District 7
- Christine Sinicki, Assembly District 20
- Robert Turner (former), Assembly District 61
- JoCasta Zamarripa, Assembly District 8

Labor unions

- American Federation of State County and Municipal Employees
- International Association of Bridge, Structural, Ornamental and Reinforcing Iron Workers
- International Association of Sheet Metal, Air, Rail and Transportation Workers
- National Nurses United
- Service Employees International Union
- United Auto Workers
- United Food and Commercial Workers
- Wisconsin State Association of Letter Carriers

Organizations

- Blue America
- Common Defense
- Congressional Progressive Caucus PAC
- Democracy for America
- End Citizens United
- Justice Democrats
- NARAL Pro-Choice America
- National Committee to Preserve Social Security and Medicare
- Progressive Change Campaign Committee
- Social Security Works
- VoteVets
- Working Families Party

==== Polling ====
| Poll source | Date(s) administered | Sample size | Margin of error | Randy Bryce | Cathy Myers | Undecided |
|---|---|---|---|---|---|---|
| Remington (R-CLF) | July 8–9, 2018 | 1,020 | ± 3.1% | 33% | 34% | 33% |

==== Primary results ====
Democratic primary results
| Party | Candidate | Votes | % |
|---|---|---|---|
| Democratic | Randy Bryce | 36,397 | 59.6 |
| Democratic | Cathy Myers | 24,690 | 40.4 |
| Total votes | | 61,087 | 100.0 |

=== General election ===
==== Endorsements ====
Bryan Steil (R)

Executive branch officials

- Mike Pence, vice president of the United States
- Donald Trump, president of the United States

U.S. representatives

- Sean Duffy, U.S. representative (WI-07)
- Glenn Grothman, U.S. representative (WI-06)
- Paul Ryan, House Speaker
- Jim Sensenbrenner, U.S. representative (WI-05)

Statewide officials

- Tommy Thompson, former governor of Wisconsin

State legislators

- Tyler August, Assembly Speaker pro tempore
- Scott Fitzgerald, Senate Majority Leader
- Mike Kuglitsch, state representative
- Amy Loudenbeck, state representative
- Steve Nass, state senator
- Jessie Rodriguez, state representative
- Ken Skowronski, state representative
- Robin Vos, Assembly Speaker
- Tom Weatherston, state representative

Organizations

- Kenosha Professional Police Association
- National Federation of Independent Business
- U.S. Chamber of Commerce
- Waukesha Young Republicans
- Wisconsin Right to Life

Local officials

- David Beth, Kenosha County sheriff
- Jonathan Delagrave, Racine County executive
- Paul Farrow, Waukesha County executive
- Kurt Picknell, Walworth County sheriff
- Christopher Schmaling, Racine County sheriff
- Richard Schmidt, Milwaukee County sheriff (Democrat)
- Eric Severson, Waukesha County sheriff
- Robert Spoden, Rock County sheriff (Democrat)

Individuals

- James Bryce, Democratic candidate Randy Bryce's brother
- Reince Priebus, former White House Chief of Staff
- Kevin Adam Steen, former congressional candidate
Randy Bryce (D)

Executive branch officials

- Barack Obama, 44th president of the United States

U.S. senators

- Bernie Sanders, U.S. Senator from Vermont and 2016 presidential candidate
- Elizabeth Warren, U.S. senator from Massachusetts

U.S. representatives from Wisconsin

- Gwen Moore, U.S. representative from Wisconsin's 4th congressional district
- Dave Obey, former U.S. representative from Wisconsin's 7th congressional district
- Mark Pocan, U.S. representative from Wisconsin's 2nd congressional district

U.S. representatives outside of Wisconsin

- Ruben Gallego, U.S. representative from Arizona's 7th congressional district
- Joe Kennedy, U.S. representative from Massachusetts's 4th congressional district
- Barbara Lee, U.S. representative from California's 13th congressional district
- Ted Lieu, U.S. representative from California's 33rd congressional district
- Jan Schakowsky, U.S. representative from Illinois's 9th congressional district
- Adam Schiff, U.S. representative from California's 28th congressional district
- Mark Takano, U.S. representative from California's 41st congressional district

Wisconsin state senators

- Tim Carpenter, Senate District 3
- Chris Larson, Senate District 7
- Robert Wirch, Senate District 22

Wisconsin state representatives

- Mandela Barnes (former), Assembly District 11
- Jonathan Brostoff, Assembly District 19
- David Crowley, Assembly District 17
- Evan Goyke, Assembly District 18
- Greta Neubauer, Assembly District 66
- Tod Ohnstad, Assembly District 65
- Daniel Riemer, Assembly District 7
- Christine Sinicki, Assembly District 20
- Robert Turner. (former), Assembly District 61
- JoCasta Zamarripa, Assembly District 8

Labor unions

- American Federation of State County and Municipal Employees
- International Association of Bridge, Structural, Ornamental and Reinforcing Iron Workers
- International Association of Sheet Metal, Air, Rail and Transportation Workers
- National Nurses United
- Service Employees International Union
- United Auto Workers
- United Food and Commercial Workers
- Wisconsin State Association of Letter Carriers

Organizations

- Blue America
- Common Defence
- Congressional Progressive Caucus PAC
- Democracy for America
- Democratic Congressional Campaign Committee "Red to Blue" Program
- End Citizens United
- Justice Democrats
- NARAL Pro-Choice America
- National Committee to Preserve Social Security and Medicare
- Progressive Change Campaign Committee
- Social Security Works
- VoteVets
- Working Families Party

Newspapers

- The Shepherd Express

Local officials

- Bill de Blasio, mayor of New York City

Individuals

- Cathy Myers, Janesville School Board member

==== Polling ====
| Poll source | Date(s) administered | Sample size | Margin of error | Bryan Steil (R) | Randy Bryce (D) | Undecided |
|---|---|---|---|---|---|---|
| Change Research (D-Bryce) | October 19–21, 2018 | 551 | – | 44% | 45% | – |
| NYT Upshot/Siena College | September 11–13, 2018 | 500 | ± 4.7% | 50% | 44% | 6% |
| Global Strategy Group (D-Bryce) | September 4–8, 2018 | 400 | ± 4.9% | 45% | 45% | 10% |
| Global Strategy Group (D-Bryce) | July 11–15, 2018 | 401 | ± 4.9% | 40% | 41% | — |

Hypothetical polling

with Paul Ryan

| Poll source | Date(s) administered | Sample size | Margin of error | Paul Ryan (R) | Randy Bryce (D) | Other | Undecided |
|---|---|---|---|---|---|---|---|
| Public Policy Polling (D) | November 9–10, 2017 | 549 | ± 4.2% | 46% | 39% | – | 15% |

==== Predictions ====
| Source | Ranking | As of |
|---|---|---|
| The Cook Political Report | Lean R | November 5, 2018 |
| Inside Elections | Lean R | November 5, 2018 |
| Sabato's Crystal Ball | Lean R | November 5, 2018 |
| RCP | Lean R | November 5, 2018 |
| Daily Kos | Lean R | November 5, 2018 |
| 538 | Likely R | November 7, 2018 |
| CNN | Lean R | October 31, 2018 |
| Politico | Lean R | November 4, 2018 |

==== Results ====
Wisconsin's 1st congressional district, 2018
| Party | Candidate | Votes | % |
|---|---|---|---|
| Republican | Bryan Steil | 177,492 | 54.6 |
| Democratic | Randy Bryce | 137,508 | 42.2 |
| Independent | Ken Yorgan | 10,006 | 3.1 |
| Independent | Joseph Kexel (write-in) | 7 | 0.0 |
| Write-in | | 304 | 0.1 |
| Total votes | | 325,317 | 100.0 |
| Republican hold | | | |

== District 2 ==
2018 Wisconsin's 2nd congressional district election
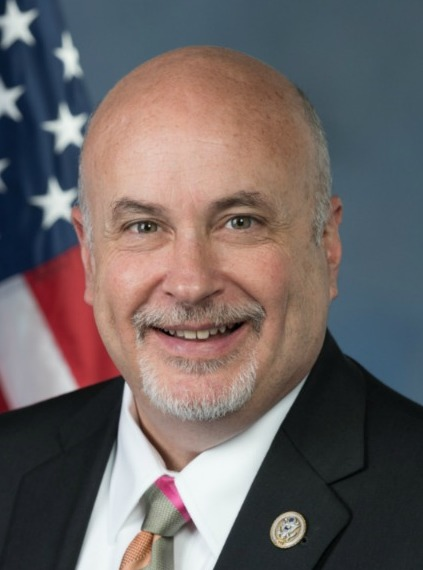
| Nominee | Mark Pocan |
| Party | Democratic |
| Popular vote | 309,116 |
| Percentage | 97.4% |
- Pocan: 50–60% 60–70% 80–90% >90% No votes
U.S. Representative before election
Mark Pocan
Democratic
Elected U.S. Representative
Mark Pocan
Democratic

The 2nd congressional district covers Dane County, Iowa County, Lafayette County, Sauk County and Green County, as well as portions of Richland County and Rock County. The district includes Madison, the state's capital, its suburbs and some of the surrounding areas. Incumbent Democrat Mark Pocan, who had represented the district since 2013, ran for re-election. He was re-elected with 69% of the vote in 2016. The district had a PVI of D+18.

=== Democratic primary ===
==== Candidates ====
===== Nominee =====
- Mark Pocan, incumbent U.S. representative

==== Primary results ====
Democratic primary results
| Party | Candidate | Votes | % |
|---|---|---|---|
| Democratic | Mark Pocan (incumbent) | 115,246 | 100.0 |
| Total votes | | 115,246 | 100.0 |

=== Republican primary ===
No Republicans filed

=== General election ===
==== Predictions ====
| Source | Ranking | As of |
|---|---|---|
| The Cook Political Report | Safe D | November 5, 2018 |
| Inside Elections | Safe D | November 5, 2018 |
| Sabato's Crystal Ball | Safe D | November 5, 2018 |
| RCP | Safe D | November 5, 2018 |
| Daily Kos | Safe D | November 5, 2018 |
| 538 | Safe D | November 7, 2018 |
| CNN | Safe D | October 31, 2018 |
| Politico | Solid D | November 4, 2018 |

==== Results ====
Wisconsin's 2nd congressional district, 2018
| Party | Candidate | Votes | % |
|---|---|---|---|
| Democratic | Mark Pocan (incumbent) | 309,116 | 97.4 |
| Republican | Joey Wayne Reed (write-in) | 29 | 0.0 |
| Independent | Rick Cruz (write-in) | 8 | 0.0 |
| Democratic | Bradley Jason Burt (write-in) | 1 | 0.0 |
| Write-in | | 8,141 | 2.6 |
| Total votes | | 317,295 | 100.0 |
| Democratic hold | | | |

== District 3 ==
2018 Wisconsin's 3rd congressional district election
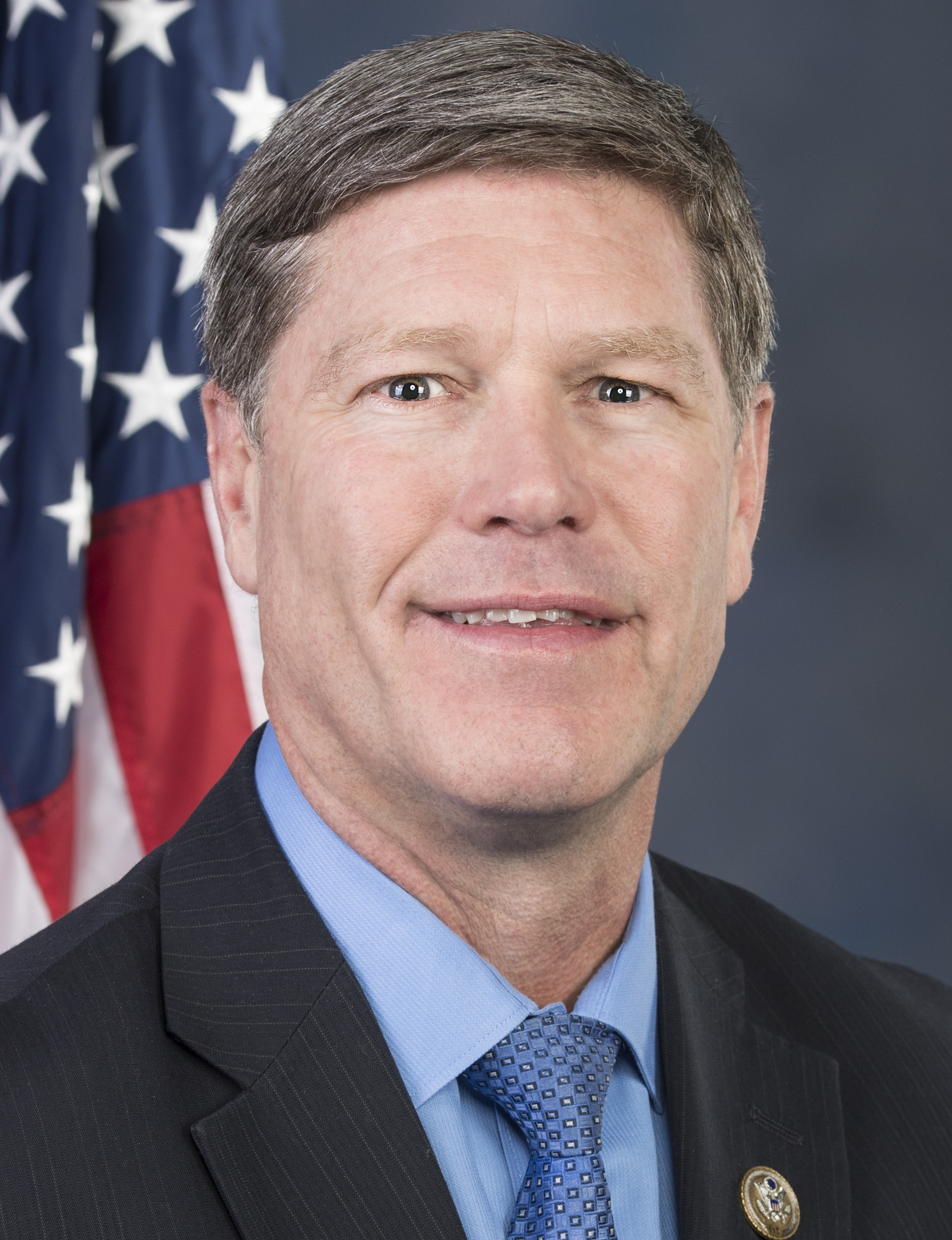

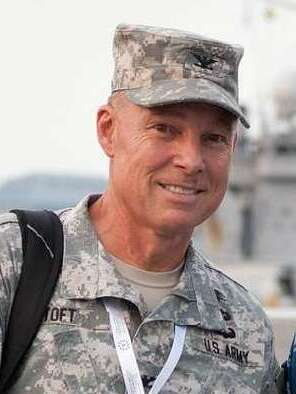
| Nominee | Ron Kind | Steve Toft |
| Party | Democratic | Republican |
| Popular vote | 187,888 | 126,980 |
| Percentage | 59.7% | 40.3% |
- Kind: 50–60% 60–70% 70–80% 80–90% >90% Toft: 50–60% 60–70% 70–80% >90% Tie: 40–50% 50% No votes
U.S. Representative before election
Ron Kind
Democratic
Elected U.S. Representative
Ron Kind
Democratic

The 3rd congressional district covers much of the Driftless Area in southwestern and western Wisconsin; The district includes the cities of La Crosse and Eau Claire. It borders the states of Minnesota, Iowa, and Illinois. Incumbent Democrat Ron Kind, who had represented the district since 1997, ran for re-election. He was re-elected with 99% of the vote in 2016. The district had an EVEN PVI, indicating an almost equal support of Democrats and Republicans.

=== Democratic primary ===
==== Candidates ====
===== Nominee =====
- Ron Kind, incumbent U.S. representative

===== Declined =====
- Juliet Germanotta, ordained minister

==== Primary results ====
Democratic primary results
| Party | Candidate | Votes | % |
|---|---|---|---|
| Democratic | Ron Kind (incumbent) | 59,643 | 100.0 |
| Total votes | | 59,643 | 100.0 |

=== Republican primary ===
==== Candidates ====
===== Nominee =====
- Steve Toft, retired Army colonel

===== Withdrawn =====
- Brandon Cook, small business owner
- Alex Virijevich

==== Primary results ====
Republican primary results
| Party | Candidate | Votes | % |
|---|---|---|---|
| Republican | Steve Toft | 35,768 | 100.0 |
| Total votes | | 35,768 | 100.0 |

=== General election ===
==== Predictions ====
| Source | Ranking | As of |
|---|---|---|
| The Cook Political Report | Safe D | November 5, 2018 |
| Inside Elections | Safe D | November 5, 2018 |
| Sabato's Crystal Ball | Safe D | November 5, 2018 |
| RCP | Likely D | November 5, 2018 |
| Daily Kos | Safe D | November 5, 2018 |
| 538 | Safe D | November 7, 2018 |
| CNN | Safe D | October 31, 2018 |
| Politico | Safe D | November 4, 2018 |

==== Results ====
Wisconsin's 3rd congressional district, 2018
| Party | Candidate | Votes | % |
|---|---|---|---|
| Democratic | Ron Kind (incumbent) | 187,888 | 59.7 |
| Republican | Steve Toft | 126,980 | 40.3 |
| Write-in | | 121 | 0.0 |
| Total votes | | 314,989 | 100.0 |
| Democratic hold | | | |

== District 4 ==
2018 Wisconsin's 4th congressional district election
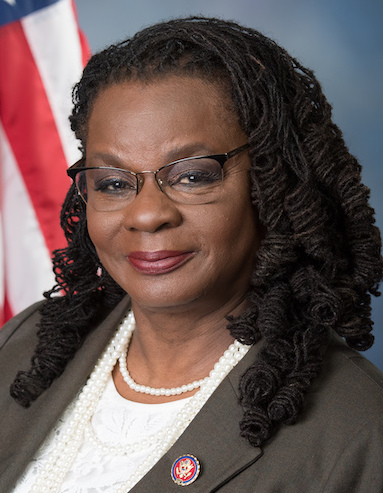

| Nominee | Gwen Moore | Tim Rogers |
| Party | Democratic | Republican |
| Popular vote | 206,487 | 59,091 |
| Percentage | 75.7% | 21.7% |
- Precinct results Moore: 40–50% 50–60% 60–70% 70–80% 80–90% >90% Rogers: 40–50% 50–60% 70–80% No votes
U.S. Representative before election
Gwen Moore
Democratic
Elected U.S. Representative
Gwen Moore
Democratic

The 4th congressional district encompasses a part of Milwaukee County and including all of the city of Milwaukee and its working-class suburbs of Cudahy, St. Francis, South Milwaukee, and West Milwaukee. Recent redistricting has added the Milwaukee County North Shore communities of Glendale, Shorewood, Whitefish Bay, Fox Point, Bayside, and Brown Deer to the district. Incumbent Democrat Gwen Moore, who had represented the district since 2005, ran for re-election. She was re-elected with 70% of the vote in 2016. The district had a PVI of D+25.

=== Democratic primary ===
==== Candidates ====
===== Nominee =====
- Gwen Moore, incumbent U.S. representative

===== Eliminated in primary =====
- Gary George, former state senator, convicted felon and candidate for this seat in 2014 & 2016

==== Primary results ====
Democratic primary results
| Party | Candidate | Votes | % |
|---|---|---|---|
| Democratic | Gwen Moore (incumbent) | 76,971 | 89.0 |
| Democratic | Gary George | 9,466 | 11.0 |
| Total votes | | 86,437 | 100.0 |

=== Republican primary ===
==== Candidates ====
===== Nominee =====
- Tim Rogers, deliveryman

===== Eliminated in primary =====
- Cindy Werner, Army veteran

==== Primary results ====
Republican primary results
| Party | Candidate | Votes | % |
|---|---|---|---|
| Republican | Tim Rogers | 8,912 | 55.6 |
| Republican | Cindy Werner | 7,121 | 44.4 |
| Total votes | | 16,033 | 100.0 |

=== Independent candidates ===
- Robert Raymond

=== General election ===
==== Predictions ====
| Source | Ranking | As of |
|---|---|---|
| The Cook Political Report | Safe D | November 5, 2018 |
| Inside Elections | Safe D | November 5, 2018 |
| Sabato's Crystal Ball | Safe D | November 5, 2018 |
| RCP | Safe D | November 5, 2018 |
| Daily Kos | Safe D | November 5, 2018 |
| 538 | Safe D | November 7, 2018 |
| CNN | Safe D | October 31, 2018 |
| Politico | Safe D | November 4, 2018 |

==== Endorsements ====
Gwen Moore (D)

Newspapers

- The Shepherd Express

==== Results ====
Wisconsin's 4th congressional district, 2018
| Party | Candidate | Votes | % |
|---|---|---|---|
| Democratic | Gwen Moore (incumbent) | 206,487 | 75.6 |
| Republican | Tim Rogers | 59,091 | 21.7 |
| Independent | Robert Raymond | 7,170 | 2.6 |
| Write-in | | 339 | 0.1 |
| Total votes | | 273,087 | 100.0 |
| Democratic hold | | | |

== District 5 ==
2018 Wisconsin's 5th congressional district election
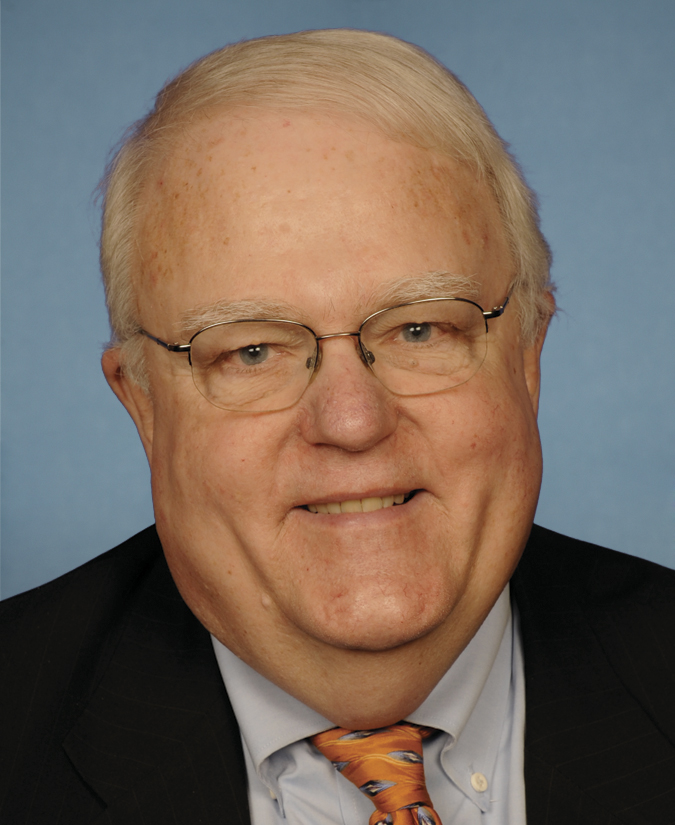

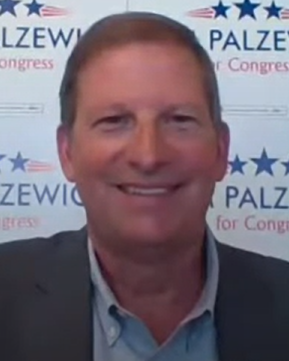
| Nominee | Jim Sensenbrenner | Tom Palzewicz |
| Party | Republican | Democratic |
| Popular vote | 225,619 | 138,385 |
| Percentage | 61.9% | 38.0% |
- Sensenbrenner: 50–60% 60–70% 70–80% 80–90% >90% Palzewicz: 40–50% 50–60% 60–70% 70–80% Tie: 50% No votes
U.S. Representative before election
Jim Sensenbrenner
Republican
Elected U.S. Representative
Jim Sensenbrenner
Republican

The 5th congressional district covers all of Washington and Jefferson counties, some of Waukesha and Dodge counties, and portions of Milwaukee and Walworth counties. Incumbent Republican Jim Sensenbrenner, who had represented the district since 1979, ran for re-election. He was re-elected with 67% of the vote in 2016. The district had a PVI of R+13.

=== Republican primary ===
==== Candidates ====
===== Nominee =====
- Jim Sensenbrenner, incumbent U.S. representative

===== Eliminated in primary =====
- Jennifer Hoppe Vipond, pediatrician

==== Primary results ====
Republican primary results
| Party | Candidate | Votes | % |
|---|---|---|---|
| Republican | Jim Sensenbrenner (incumbent) | 73,397 | 81.2 |
| Republican | Jennifer Hoppe Vipond | 17,010 | 18.8 |
| Total votes | | 90,407 | 100.0 |

=== Democratic primary ===
==== Candidates ====
===== Nominee =====
- Tom Palzewicz, small businessman

==== Primary results ====
Democratic primary results
| Party | Candidate | Votes | % |
|---|---|---|---|
| Democratic | Tom Palzewicz | 43,192 | 100.0 |
| Total votes | | 43,192 | 100.0 |

=== General election ===
==== Predictions ====
| Source | Ranking | As of |
|---|---|---|
| The Cook Political Report | Safe R | November 5, 2018 |
| Inside Elections | Safe R | November 5, 2018 |
| Sabato's Crystal Ball | Safe R | November 5, 2018 |
| RCP | Safe R | November 5, 2018 |
| Daily Kos | Safe R | November 5, 2018 |
| 538 | Safe R | November 7, 2018 |
| CNN | Safe R | October 31, 2018 |
| Politico | Safe R | November 4, 2018 |

==== Endorsements ====
Tom Palzewicz (D)

Newspapers

- The Shepherd Express

==== Results ====
Wisconsin's 5th congressional district, 2018
| Party | Candidate | Votes | % |
|---|---|---|---|
| Republican | Jim Sensenbrenner (incumbent) | 225,619 | 61.9 |
| Democratic | Tom Palzewicz | 138,385 | 38.0 |
| Write-in | | 283 | 0.1 |
| Democratic | Ramon Garcia (write-in) | 1 | 0.0 |
| Total votes | | 364,288 | 100.0 |
| Republican hold | | | |

== District 6 ==
2018 Wisconsin's 6th congressional district election
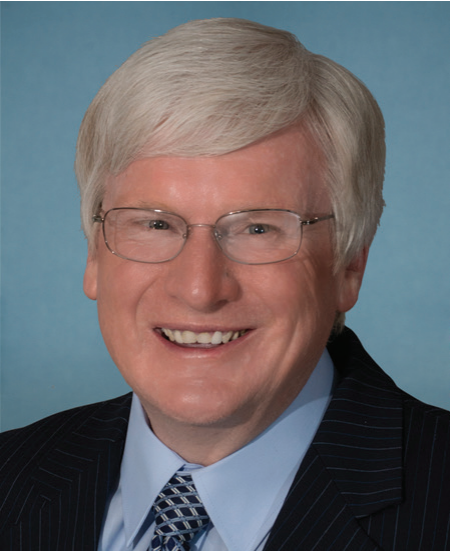

| Nominee | Glenn Grothman | Dan Kohl |
| Party | Republican | Democratic |
| Popular vote | 180,311 | 144,536 |
| Percentage | 55.4% | 45.5% |
- Grothman: 50–60% 60–70% 70–80% 80–90% >90% Kohl: 50–60% 60–70% 70–80% >90% Tie: 40–50% 50% No votes
U.S. Representative before election
Glenn Grothman
Republican
Elected U.S. Representative
Glenn Grothman
Republican

The 6th congressional district is located in eastern Wisconsin, including the outer suburbs of Milwaukee, Madison, and Green Bay, it includes all or portions of the following counties: Adams, Columbia, Dodge, Fond du Lac, Green Lake, Jefferson, Manitowoc, Marquette, Ozaukee, Sheboygan, Waushara, and Winnebago. It also includes a small portion of far northern Milwaukee County around River Hills. Incumbent Republican Glenn Grothman, who had represented the district since 2015, ran for re-election. He was re-elected with 57% of the vote in 2016. The district had a PVI of R+8.

=== Republican primary ===
==== Candidates ====
===== Nominee =====
- Glenn Grothman, incumbent U.S. representative (R-Campbellsport)

===== Withdrawn =====
- Scott Olmer

==== Primary results ====
Republican primary results
| Party | Candidate | Votes | % |
|---|---|---|---|
| Republican | Glenn Grothman (incumbent) | 60,485 | 100.0 |
| Total votes | | 60,485 | 100.0 |

=== Democratic primary ===
==== Candidates ====
===== Nominee =====
- Dan Kohl, attorney, former Milwaukee Bucks executive

===== Withdrawn =====
- Sarah Lloyd, farmer and nominee for this seat in 2016

==== Primary results ====
Democratic primary results
| Party | Candidate | Votes | % |
|---|---|---|---|
| Democratic | Dan Kohl | 41,862 | 100.0 |
| Total votes | | 41,862 | 100.0 |

=== General election ===
==== Endorsements ====
Dan Kohl (D)

Organizations

- Democratic Congressional Campaign Committee "Red to Blue" Program

Newspapers

- The Shepherd Express

==== Polling ====
| Poll source | Date(s) administered | Sample size | Margin of error | Glenn Grothman (R) | Dan Kohl (D) | Undecided |
|---|---|---|---|---|---|---|
| JMC Analytics/Bold Blue Campaigns | October 29 – November 3, 2018 | 500 | ± 4.5% | 61% | 33% | 6% |
| Change Research (D) | October 27–29, 2018 | 525 | – | 50% | 48% | – |

==== Predictions ====
| Source | Ranking | As of |
|---|---|---|
| The Cook Political Report | Likely R | November 5, 2018 |
| Inside Elections | Safe R | November 5, 2018 |
| Sabato's Crystal Ball | Likely R | November 5, 2018 |
| RCP | Safe R | November 5, 2018 |
| Daily Kos | Likely R | November 5, 2018 |
| 538 | Safe R | November 7, 2018 |
| CNN | Lean R | October 31, 2018 |
| Politico | Lean R | November 4, 2018 |

==== Results ====
Wisconsin's 6th congressional district, 2018
| Party | Candidate | Votes | % |
|---|---|---|---|
| Republican | Glenn Grothman (incumbent) | 180,311 | 55.4 |
| Democratic | Dan Kohl | 144,536 | 44.5 |
| Write-in | | 218 | 0.1 |
| Total votes | | 325,065 | 100.0 |
| Republican hold | | | |

== District 7 ==
2018 Wisconsin's 7th congressional district election
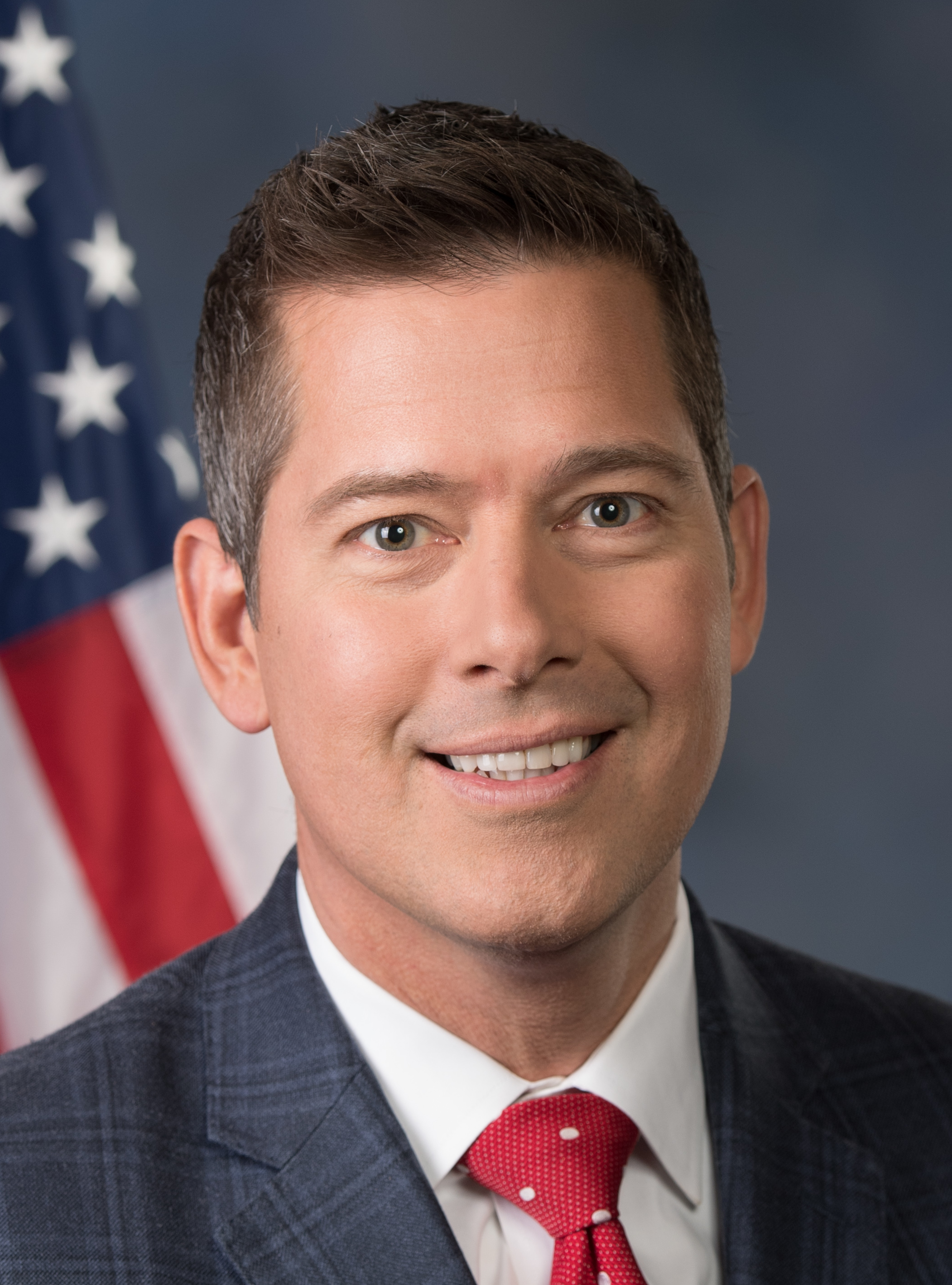

| Nominee | Sean Duffy | Margaret Engebretson |
| Party | Republican | Democratic |
| Popular vote | 194,061 | 124,307 |
| Percentage | 60.1% | 38.5% |
- Duffy: 40–50% 50–60% 60–70% 70–80% 80–90% >90% Engebretson: 40–50% 50–60% 60–70% 70–80% 80–90% >90% Tie: 40–50% 50% No votes
U.S. Representative before election
Sean Duffy
Republican
Elected U.S. Representative
Sean Duffy
Republican

The 7th congressional district is located in northern and western Wisconsin, and is the largest congressional district in the state geographically, covering 20 counties (in whole or part), for a total of 18,787 sq mi. The district contains the following counties: Ashland, Barron, Bayfield, Burnett, Chippewa, Clark (partial), Douglas, Iron, Langlade (partial), Lincoln, Marathon, Oneida, Polk, Portage, Price, Rusk, St. Croix, Sawyer, Taylor, Washburn and Wood. Incumbent Republican Sean Duffy, who had represented the district since 2015, ran for re-election. He was re-elected with 62% of the vote in 2016. The district had a PVI of R+8.

=== Republican primary ===
==== Candidates ====
===== Nominee =====
- Sean Duffy, incumbent U.S. representative

==== Primary results ====
Republican primary results
| Party | Candidate | Votes | % |
|---|---|---|---|
| Republican | Sean Duffy (incumbent) | 60,708 | 100.0 |
| Total votes | | 60,708 | 100.0 |

=== Democratic primary ===
==== Candidates ====
===== Nominee =====
- Margaret Ruth Engebretson, Polk County attorney

===== Eliminated in primary =====
- Brian Ewert, doctor

===== Withdrawn =====
- David Beeksma
- Kyle Frenette
- Bob Look
- Dennis Frank Paulaha

==== Primary results ====
Democratic primary results
| Party | Candidate | Votes | % |
|---|---|---|---|
| Democratic | Margaret Ruth Engebretson | 27,179 | 57.3 |
| Democratic | Brian Ewert | 20,257 | 42.7 |
| Total votes | | 47,436 | 100.0 |

=== General election ===
==== Predictions ====
| Source | Ranking | As of |
|---|---|---|
| The Cook Political Report | Safe R | November 5, 2018 |
| Inside Elections | Safe R | November 5, 2018 |
| Sabato's Crystal Ball | Safe R | November 5, 2018 |
| RCP | Safe R | November 5, 2018 |
| Daily Kos | Safe R | November 5, 2018 |
| 538 | Safe R | November 7, 2018 |
| CNN | Safe R | October 31, 2018 |
| Politico | Safe R | November 4, 2018 |

==== Results ====
Wisconsin's 7th congressional district, 2018
| Party | Candidate | Votes | % |
|---|---|---|---|
| Republican | Sean Duffy (incumbent) | 194,061 | 60.1 |
| Democratic | Margaret Engebretson | 124,307 | 38.5 |
| Independent | Ken Driessen | 4,416 | 1.4 |
| Democratic | Bob Look (write-in) | 3 | 0.0 |
| Write-in | | 53 | 0.0 |
| Total votes | | 322,840 | 100.0 |
| Republican hold | | | |

== District 8 ==
2018 Wisconsin's 8th congressional district election
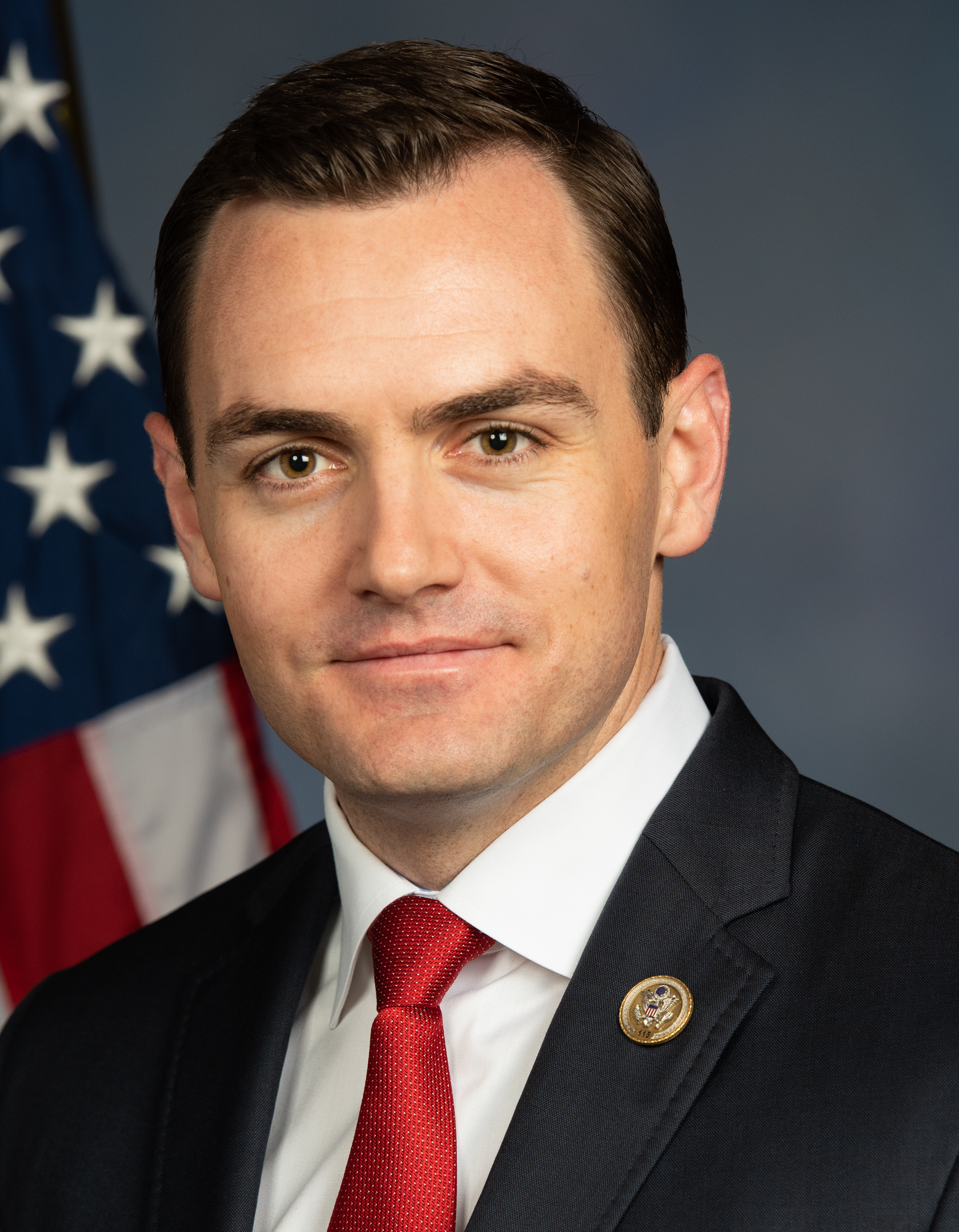

| Nominee | Mike Gallagher | Beau Liegeois |
| Party | Republican | Democratic |
| Popular vote | 209,410 | 119,265 |
| Percentage | 63.7% | 36.3% |
- Gallagher: 50–60% 60–70% 70–80% 80–90% >90% Liegeois: 50–60% 60–70% 70–80% 80–90% >90% Tie: 50% No votes
U.S. Representative before election
Mike Gallagher
Republican
Elected U.S. Representative
Mike Gallagher
Republican

The 8th congressional district includes Green Bay and Appleton. Incumbent Republican Mike Gallagher, who had represented the district since 2017, ran for re-election. He was elected with 63% of the vote in 2016. The district had a PVI of R+7.

=== Republican primary ===
==== Candidates ====
===== Nominee =====
- Mike Gallagher, incumbent U.S. representative

==== Primary results ====
Republican primary results
| Party | Candidate | Votes | % |
|---|---|---|---|
| Republican | Mike Gallagher (incumbent) | 62,524 | 100.0 |
| Total votes | | 62,524 | 100.0 |

=== Democratic primary ===
==== Candidates ====
===== Nominee =====
- Beau Liegeois, Brown County assistant district attorney

==== Primary results ====
Democratic primary results
| Party | Candidate | Votes | % |
|---|---|---|---|
| Democratic | Beau Liegeois | 38,450 | 100.0 |
| Total votes | | 38,450 | 100.0 |

=== General election ===
==== Predictions ====
| Source | Ranking | As of |
|---|---|---|
| The Cook Political Report | Safe R | November 5, 2018 |
| Inside Elections | Safe R | November 5, 2018 |
| Sabato's Crystal Ball | Safe R | November 5, 2018 |
| RCP | Safe R | November 5, 2018 |
| Daily Kos | Safe R | November 5, 2018 |
| 538 | Safe R | November 7, 2018 |
| CNN | Safe R | October 31, 2018 |
| Politico | Likely R | November 4, 2018 |

==== Results ====
Wisconsin's 8th congressional district, 2018
| Party | Candidate | Votes | % |
|---|---|---|---|
| Republican | Mike Gallagher (incumbent) | 209,410 | 63.7 |
| Democratic | Beau Liegeois | 119,265 | 36.3 |
| Write-in | | 99 | 0.0 |
| Total votes | | 328,774 | 100.0 |
| Republican hold | | | |
