= Dancing Hot Dog =

Virtual character

The Dancing Hot Dog character

The Dancing Hot Dog is the name often used to refer to a character and an Internet meme that originated in 2017, after the Snapchat mobile app released an augmented reality camera lens that includes an animated rendering of a dancing anthropomorphic hot dog.

== Release and lens description ==
Snapchat often releases lenses and filters for its users to use; like the app's other lenses, the dancing hot dog is found by opening the in-app camera and tapping the screen until the lenses appear. The hot dog can be made larger or smaller, and it can also be moved around the screen, including when users record video. While many lenses use a phone's front-facing camera, the hot dog lens requires users to switch to their rear-facing camera.

The lens uses augmented reality (AR) technology to display a 3-D rendering of an anthropomorphic hot dog. The hot dog is shown in a bun, wearing headphones and enjoying music. By tracking real-world geometry, the hot dog will affix itself to in-frame real world objects and move along with them.

The song used in the lens is licensed by Jingle Punks Music, and is titled "Cool Nights-JP" by the artist Hint of Mint.

== Usage and popularity as a meme ==
One of the earliest notable uses of the lens was in a video posted onto YouTube on June 23, 2017, showing a woman receiving a nose piercing while the hot dog appears to dance on her shoulder. Shortly thereafter, the meme spread throughout the Internet, and most notably on Twitter, with many users posting images and videos showing the hot dog in humorous situations. USA Today also reported that on the 4th of July, a tweet showing a video of the hot dog being "taken away" by a child in a shopping cart helped jump-start the lens' usage as a meme.

Jay Hathaway of The Daily Dot detailed the meme's reception from Internet users, writing, "Because Snapchat is a huge part of Internet culture, the hot dog is a universal reference for teens and millennials. It's highly recognizable, and it's everywhere. The ubiquity of the hot dog has led meme elitists to declare it 'dead' already—due to appearances on derivative sites like 9gag and iFunny." The Washington Post also posted about meme's reception, highlighting positive tweets about it. The A.V. Club described the meme's popularity as "[a] brief, blissful moment of completely unobjectionable Internet celebrity." SB Nation used the meme in a light-hearted post, photoshopping the hot dog into images of iconic sports moments.

== Removal ==
Snapchat removed the hot dog lens in September 2017. Snapchat stated that its lenses and filters are rotated to keep the app fun and entertaining. In early December 2018 the Hot Dog filter was added again.

== Legacy ==
The lens inspired mobile app developer Anonymous Inc to release the platformer, Dancing Hotdog!, which online media outlets reported had no affiliation to Snapchat or Snap Inc. Both Mashable and Engadget commented that the game was frustratingly difficult, likening it to Flappy Bird, and both publications also expressed annoyance with the game's ads.

== See also ==
- Pokémon Go, another popular usage of AR technology
- The Delicious One, another anthropomorphized hot dog
