= David Neiwert =

American journalist

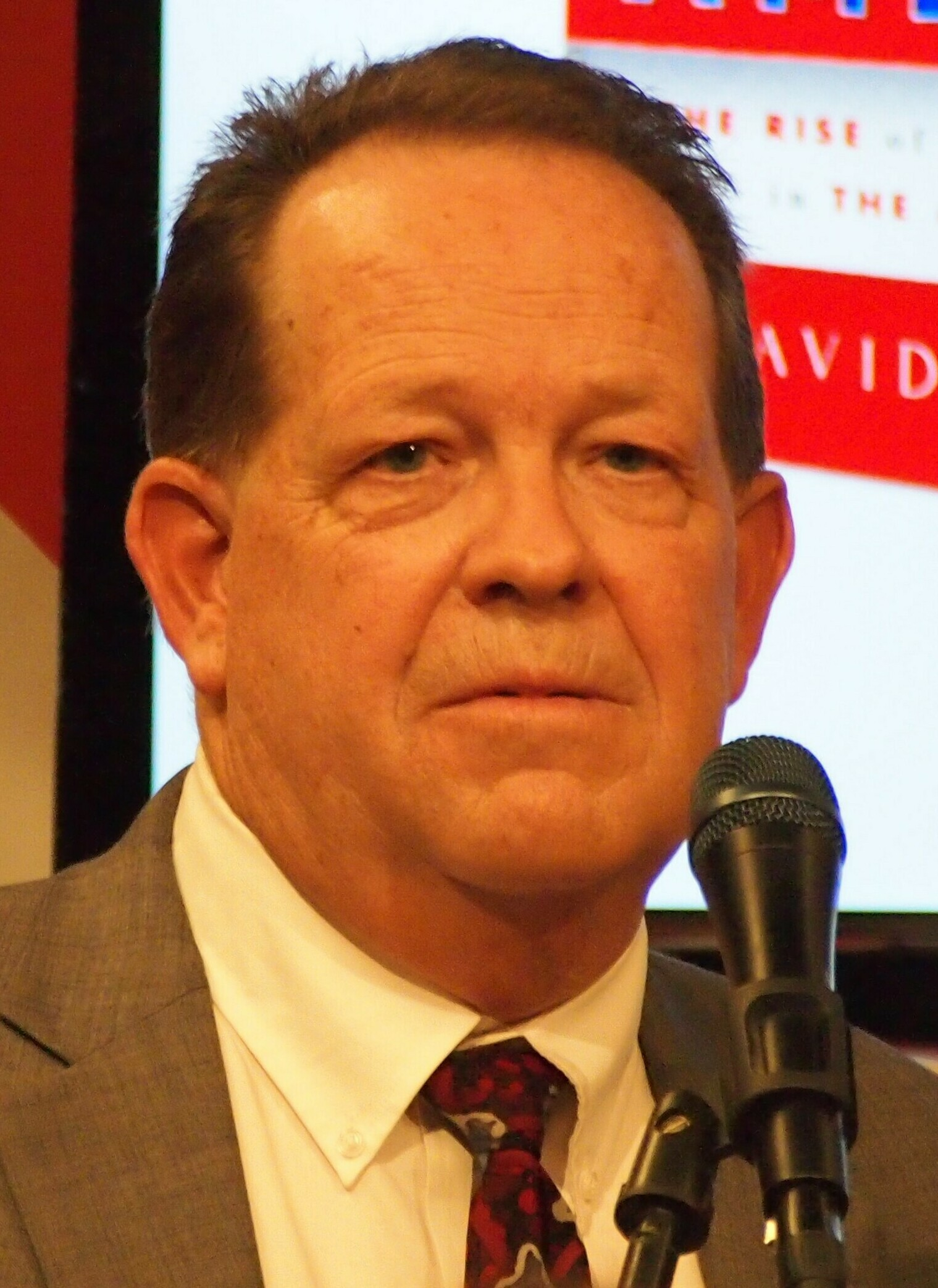
- Born: Idaho Falls, Idaho, U.S.
- Education: University of Idaho (BA)
- Employer(s): Southern Poverty Law Center (before 2019); Daily Kos (2019–present)
- Spouse: Lisa Dowling (m. 1989)
- Children: 1
- Writing career
- Subject: Domestic terrorism in the United States
- Notable work: Alt-America
- Notable awards: National Press Club Award for Distinguished Online Journalism (2000)

David Neiwert is an American freelance journalist and blogger. He received the National Press Club Award for Distinguished Online Journalism in 2000 for a domestic terrorism series he produced for MSNBC's website. Neiwert has concentrated in part on extremism in the Northwest.

== Work ==
He worked at newspapers around the Pacific Northwest from 1978 to 1996, notably in Idaho (at Sandpoint, Blackfoot, Lewiston, Moscow, and Twin Falls); Montana (Missoula); and in western Washington (Kent, Bellevue, and Seattle). He went to work at MSNBC.com in 1996 as a writer-producer, where he continued through late 2000. Since then, he has focused on writing books and producing his blog Orcinus, which tends to report on the crossover between the mainstream and the far right.

The Northwest Progressive Institute named its annual awards to the region's best liberal bloggers after Neiwert. He edited the political blog Crooks And Liars from 2008 to 2012. As of 2018, Neiwert worked with the Southern Poverty Law Center as their Pacific Northwest correspondent. His book, And Hell Followed With Her: Crossing the Dark Side of the American Border, won the 2014 International Latino Book Award for general nonfiction.

In January 2019, Neiwert left the SPLC blog Hatewatch to join Daily Kos as a correspondent.

Neiwert's 2020 book Red Pill, Blue Pill discusses how radicalization and conspiracy theories may be opposed on the individual level.

== Personal life ==
Neiwert was raised in Idaho Falls, Idaho. He comes from a German-American background and was brought up in Methodist Christianity. According to Neiwert, sympathy for the John Birch Society was widespread amongst the population he grew up surrounded by and is "probably part of why I'm immune to conspiracism."

Neiwert attended the University of Idaho, where he obtained his B.A. in English (1984), as well as the University of Montana (1987–88), where he studied creative writing. He notes that he contributed to Republican political campaigns during this time.

He has been married since 1989 to Lisa Dowling of Helena, Montana.

== Bibliography ==
- In God's Country: The Patriot Movement and the Pacific Northwest, 1999 (ISBN 978-0874221756)
- Death on the Fourth of July: The Story of a Killing, a Trial, and Hate Crime in America, 2004 (ISBN 978-1403969002)
- Strawberry Days: How Internment Destroyed a Japanese American Community, 2005 (ISBN 978-1403967923)
- The Eliminationists: How Hate Talk Radicalized the American Right, 2009 (ISBN 978-0981576985)
- And Hell Followed With Her: Crossing the Dark Side of the American Border, 2013 (ISBN 978-1568587257)
- Of Orcas and Men: What Killer Whales Can Teach Us, 2015 (ISBN 978-1468308655)
- Alt-America: The Rise of the Radical Right in the Age of Trump, 2017 (ISBN 978-1-78663-423-8)
- Red Pill, Blue Pill: How to Counteract the Conspiracy Theories That Are Killing Us, 2020 (ISBN 9781633886261)
- The Age of Insurrection: The Radical Right's Assault on American Democracy, 2023 ISBN 978-1-68589-037-7)

== See also ==
- I Don't Speak German
