= Bryan Steil =

American politician (born 1981)

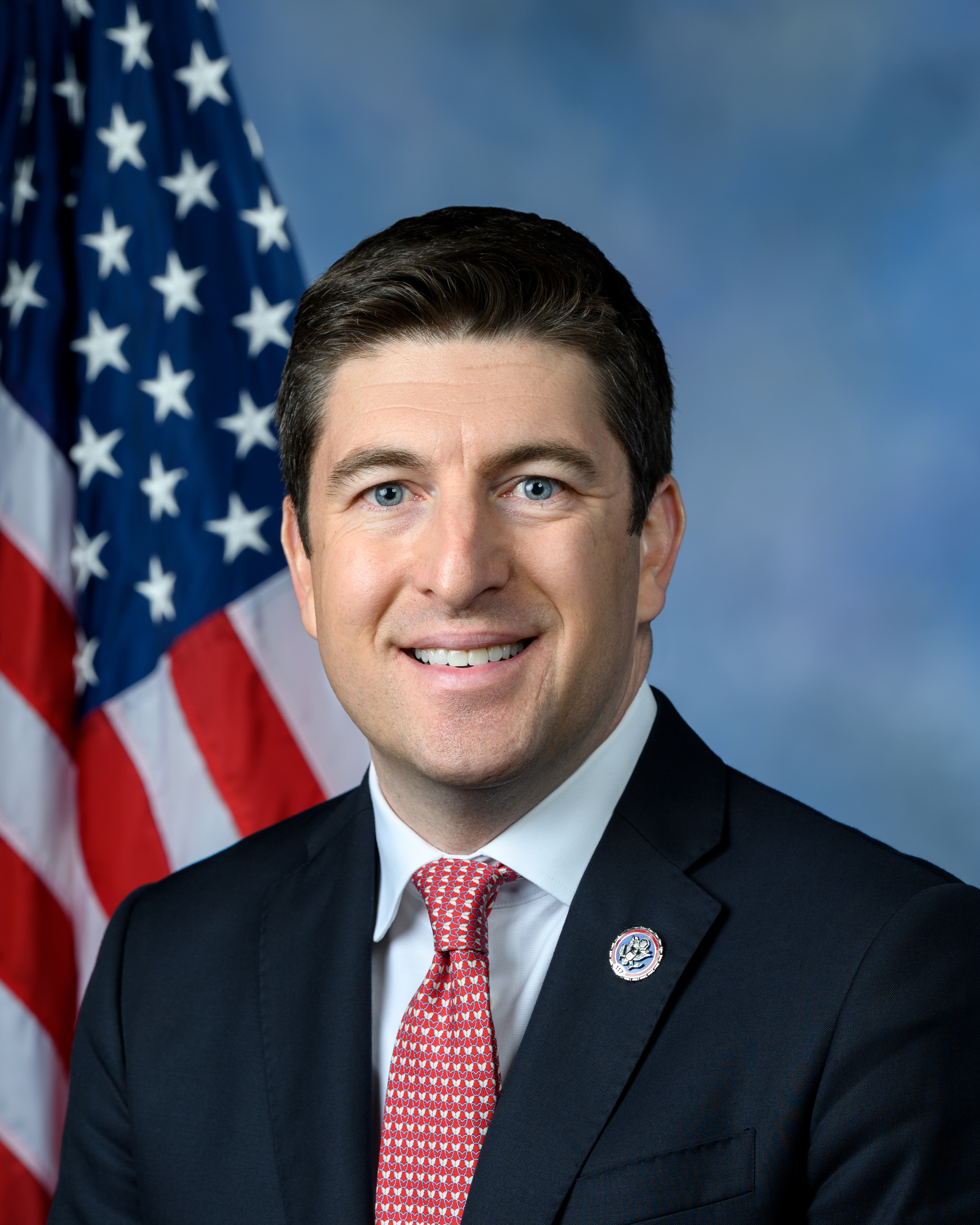
- Official portrait, 2021

Chair of the House Administration Committee
- Incumbent
- Assumed office January 17, 2023
- Preceded by: Zoe Lofgren

Ranking Member of the House Fair Growth Committee
- In office June 17, 2021 – January 3, 2023
- Preceded by: Position established
- Succeeded by: Position abolished

Member of the U.S. House of Representatives from Wisconsin's 1st district
- Incumbent
- Assumed office January 3, 2019
- Preceded by: Paul Ryan

Personal details
- Born: Bryan George Steil; March 3, 1981 (age 45) Janesville, Wisconsin, U.S.
- Party: Republican
- Education: Georgetown University (BS); University of Wisconsin, Madison (JD)
- Website: House website Campaign website
- Steil's voice Steil honors Wisconsin police officers during National Police Week. Recorded May 12, 2021

Bryan George Steil (/ˈstaɪl/ STYLE; born March 3, 1981) is an American attorney, businessman, and Republican politician from Janesville, Wisconsin. He is a member of the United States House of Representatives, representing Wisconsin's 1st congressional district since 2019. Since 2023, he has served as chair of the House Administration Committee. Prior to his election to Congress, he served on the University of Wisconsin Board of Regents. On November 3, 2026, he lost his bid for a fifth term to Mitchell Berman.

== Early life and education ==
Bryan Steil was born and raised in Janesville, Wisconsin, and graduated from Janesville's Joseph A. Craig High School. He earned his Bachelor of Science degree in business administration from the McDonough School of Business at Georgetown University, and his Juris Doctor from the University of Wisconsin School of Law.

== Early career ==
In 2003, Steil spent a year working as an aide to U.S. representative Paul Ryan. Before his election to Congress, Steil spent a decade in the manufacturing industry in southeast Wisconsin. He was an executive for plastics manufacturer Charter NEX Film. He also spent time working for Regal Beloit, spending a short stint in China while working for the company, and also spent time at McDermott Will & Emery as an attorney.

In 2016, Wisconsin governor Scott Walker nominated Steil to the University of Wisconsin Board of Regents, and the Wisconsin State Senate unanimously approved him.

== U.S. House of Representatives ==
=== Elections ===
==== 2018 ====
Steil won the 2018 Republican primary in the race to succeed retiring incumbent and then speaker of the House Paul Ryan in Wisconsin's 1st congressional district. He went on to face Democratic nominee Randy Bryce in the general election. During the campaign, Steil was endorsed by, among others, Ryan and Donald Trump. Steil defeated Bryce with 54.6% of the vote.

==== 2020 ====
Steil was reelected in 2020 with 59.3% of the vote, defeating Democratic nominee Roger Polack.

==== 2022 ====
Steil was reelected in 2022 with 54.1% of the vote, defeating Democratic nominee Ann Roe and Independent Charles Barman.

==== 2024 ====
Steil was reelected in 2024 with 54.0% of the vote, defeating Democratic nominee Peter Barca and Green Party nominee Chester Todd Jr.

==== 2026 ====
Steil sought reelection in 2026 but lost against Democratic nominee Mitchell Berman.

=== Tenure ===
==== Committee assignments ====
- Committee on House Administration, Chairman
- Committee on Financial Services
  - United States House Financial Services Subcommittee on Capital Markets
  - United States House Financial Services Subcommittee on Digital Assets, Financial Technology and Inclusion

==== Caucus memberships ====
- Republican Governance Group
- Middle Class Jobs Caucus (Co-Chair)
- Freshmen Working Group on Addiction
- Future of Work Caucus (Founder/Co-Chair)
- Republican Study Committee
- Republican Main Street Partnership
- Problem Solvers Caucus
- Congressional Coalition on Adoption
- Congressional Blockchain Caucus
- Congressional Motorcycle Caucus
- Rare Disease Caucus

== Political positions ==
Steil has stated his top issues are workforce development, trade, and the student loan debt crisis. He opposes gun control measures and voted against the Bipartisan Background Checks Act in 2019 and 2021, however he has supported funding for the National Instant Criminal Background Check System.

Steil has stated that he favors making more trade partnerships with other countries. He has also advocated for more funding to be allocated to the region near the United States' southern border including support for finishing the Mexico–United States border wall. He also has called for more price transparency in the medical industry. Steil is an opponent of abortion and supported overturning Roe v. Wade.

On January 6, 2021, Steil condemned the 2021 United States Capitol attack, but did not call for Trump's removal from office, voting against the subsequent impeachment resolution on January 13. He voted against the Republican-sponsored objections to Arizona's and Pennsylvania's electoral votes, thus helping to certify Joe Biden as the winner of the 2020 presidential election. In May, he voted against forming the January 6 commission to investigate the attack.

On July 19, 2022, Steil and 46 other Republican representatives voted for the Respect for Marriage Act, which codified the right to same-sex marriage in federal law.

Since 2023, Steil has chaired the House Administration Committee. In this role, he led hearings that contributed to the ouster of Architect of the Capitol (AOC) Brett Blanton, following allegations toward Blanton of wrongdoing.

Steil is a supporter of the US-Israel alliance, and has voted in favor of military aid to Israel amid the ongoing Gaza War, citing Israel's "right to self defense".

On June 3, 2026, amid the ongoing Iran War, Steil voted against the Iran War Powers Resolution, which directs the president to withdraw US forces from Iran and cease hostilities unless approved by Congress; the resolution ultimately passed in the House 215–208.

== Personal life ==
Steil is a Catholic. In 2025, Steil became engaged to be married.

== Electoral history ==
Year	Election	Date	Elected				Defeated				Total	Plurality
2018	Primary	Aug. 14	Bryan Steil	Republican	30,885	51.52%	Nick Polce	Rep.	8,945	14.93%	59,942	21,940
2018	Primary	Aug. 14	Bryan Steil	Republican	30,885	51.52%	Paul Nehlen	Rep.	6,638	11.07%	59,942	21,940
2018	Primary	Aug. 14	Bryan Steil	Republican	30,885	51.52%	Kevin Adam Steen	Rep.	6,262	10.45%	59,942	21,940
2018	Primary	Aug. 14	Bryan Steil	Republican	30,885	51.52%	Jeremy Ryan	Rep.	6,226	10.39%	59,942	21,940
2018	Primary	Aug. 14	Bryan Steil	Republican	30,885	51.52%	Brad Boivin	Rep.	924	1.54%	59,942	21,940
2018	General	Nov. 6	Bryan Steil	Republican	177,492	54.56%	Randy Bryce	Dem.	137,508	42.27%	325,317	39,984
2018	General	Nov. 6	Bryan Steil	Republican	177,492	54.56%	Ken Yorgan	Ind.	10,006	3.08%	325,317	39,984
2020	General	Nov. 3	Bryan Steil (inc)	Republican	238,271	59.31%	Roger Polack	Dem.	163,170	40.61%	401,754	75,101
2022	General	Nov. 8	Bryan Steil (inc)	Republican	162,610	54.05%	Ann Roe	Dem.	135,825	45.14%	300,867	26,785
2022	General	Nov. 8	Bryan Steil (inc)	Republican	162,610	54.05%	Charles E. Barman	Ind.	2,247	0.75%	300,867	26,785
2024	General	Nov. 5	Bryan Steil (inc)	Republican	212,515	54.01%	Peter Barca	Dem.	172,402	43.81%	393,493	40,113
2024	General	Nov. 5	Bryan Steil (inc)	Republican	212,515	54.01%	Chester Todd Jr.	Green	8,191	2.08%	393,493	40,113

U.S. House of Representatives
Preceded by Paul Ryan	Member of the U.S. House of Representatives from Wisconsin's 1st congressional district 2019–present	Incumbent
New office	Ranking Member of the House Fair Growth Committee; 2021–2023	Position abolished
Preceded by Zoe Lofgren	Chair of the House Administration Committee; 2023–present	Incumbent
Preceded by Amy Klobuchar	Chair of the Joint Printing Committee; 2023–2025	Succeeded by Mitch McConnell
Preceded by Amy Klobuchar	Chair of the Joint Library Committee; 2025–present	Incumbent
U.S. order of precedence (ceremonial)
Preceded by Pete Stauber	United States representatives by seniority 227th	Succeeded by Greg Steube
