= I Don't Speak German =

Podcast about white nationalism

- Genre: Political podcast
- Language: English

Cast and voices
- Hosted by: Daniel Harper, Jack Graham

Production
- Length: 24-120 minutes

Publication
- Original release: January 8, 2019

Related
- Website: idontspeakgerman.libsyn.com

I Don't Speak German is a podcast about white nationalism in the United States, self-described as "a podcast confronting white nationalism one asshole at a time" by its hosts Daniel Harper and Jack Graham.

== History ==
Harper started the podcast after listening to Fash The Nation, and after the Unite the Right rally white nationalist movement occurred.

Episodes in September 2019 discussed Siege, a collection of neo-Nazi writings by James Nolan Mason, considered essential reading by The Base – a neo-Nazi hate group – and the Bowl Patrol, a group of idolizers of Dylann Roof. The groups adhere to its theory of accelerationism, which advocates for mass killings to create a white ethnostate. Harper also discussed Bowl Patrol's leader, Andrew Richard Casarez a.k.a. "Vic Mackey", who has a "penchant for trafficking in obscene rape and death threats".

Casarez, and former Wisconsin congressional candidate Paul Nehlen (whom Harper called "a vicious, horrible human being"), attempted to dox Harper, finding a similarly named individual in the town of Dexter, Michigan. Bowl Patrol members began driving by this unrelated house, taking photos and videos of the home, to send threats to Harper. Days later, US Army soldier and Atomwaffen Division member Jarrett Smith was arrested in Fort Riley, Kansas, alleging he discussed bomb-making, sending bombs to CNN and Beto O'Rourke, and setting fire to Harper's house.

In late October 2019, a video was posted on Nehlen's Telegram channel, showing his Bowl Patrol patch and the incorrect Harper house. The residents later received a threatening white supremacist letter directed at Harper, signed "the Cüm Bomber". Black-clad members of The Base continued to visit the house through mid-December, including taking flash photos of the house the same night the residents came home with their newborn son. The family wrote to Harper, asking him to publicly disavow the address. Harper was finally able to get a response from the FBI and the Washtenaw County Sheriff's Office; the Sheriff's office described the details as "non-threatening photographs and statements," indicated they had not connected Jarrett Smith to the other people casing the house, and that they considered the case closed.

In October 2020, two members of The Base were arrested by the FBI for their harassment at the home a year earlier, and were charged with gang membership, unlawful posting of a message, and using computers to commit a crime.

== Reception ==
The podcast was described as "uncomfortable" by The A.V. Club's Anthony D. Herrera, who said that "what is most surprising about I Don't Speak German is just how much cringe comedy is involved in the lives of these racists".

Writing for The Daily Beast, Nick R. Martin said it "might be the most important podcast countering the white nationalist movement today."

== See also ==
- Christopher Cantwell
- Political podcast
- Proud Boys
- Tom Kawcyznski
- Traditionalist Worker Party
- White supremacy in the United States
