= Alt-America =

Book by David Neiwert about American right-wing movements

- Author: David Neiwert
- Subject: alt-right
- Genre: political analysis
- Published: 2017
- Publisher: Verso Books
- Pages: 456
- ISBN: 978-1-78663-423-8

Alt-America: The Rise of the Radical Right in the Age of Trump is a 2017 nonfiction book by investigative journalist David Neiwert in which provides an account of how disparate but interrelated elements of American culture ranging from the Birther movement to Gamergate to the militia movement came together to elect Donald Trump and create the alt-right.

== Summary ==
Unlike some other analyses of the alt-right, such as George Hawley's more narrowly focused How to Make Sense of the Alt-Right, Neiwert provides his analysis from a broad vantage point. Neiwert walks through a wide variety of cultural movements and subcultures on the right, exploring how they connect, how they affect each other, and how they interpret the outside world.

Beginning with the Presidency of Bill Clinton, Neiwert examines the rise of the survivalist and militia movements during this time. He investigates the manner by which the New World Order conspiracy theory and the white supremacist movement during the Civil Rights era presaged these new growths during the Clinton administration. The federal marshal siege at Ruby Ridge and the siege at Waco siege of the Branch Davidians further radicalized the militia movement. During the Presidency of George W. Bush, the militia movement declined in prominence, but the 9/11 Truth movement grew. Following the election of Barack Obama and during his subsequent presidency, the level of far-right terror attacks rose again and federal stand-offs returned. During this time, the right-wing media ecosystem changed dramatically, impacted by the emergence of Breitbart, the alignment of Fox News with the Tea Party movement, led by Glenn Beck, and the rise of Richard B. Spencer on the far right of the party. Neiwert ties these movements together to explain the rise of Donald Trump in the 2016 United States presidential election.

Neiwert is largely unconvinced by the economic explanations for Trump's victory. Rather, he argues, the collision of cultural factors on the right led to the success of the candidate.

== Reception ==
The Washington Post highlights how Neiwert goes beyond particular conservative schisms of online subcultures to try to paint a picture of how the different facets of the alt-right, the right wing, and conspiracy theorists connect to create new dynamics and American modes of behavior. Though the Post argues that Neiwert's "analysis can be too broad," it concludes by noting that it "draws some intriguing connections" that cannot be found in a more limited work.

The International Socialist Review (ISR) describes the book as a fully comprehensive "narrative encyclopedia" that provides a fully-developed, highly methodical view of the history that keeps the reader engaged through its "dramatic" tone. Though the ISR finds "Neiwert’s prescriptions for defeating the alt-right... disappointing—a focus on human empathy in talking with others, nonviolent protest, and the use of the ballot box", it comes to the conclusion that book serves as "an excellent and necessary guide".

Kirkus Reviews called the book "A prescient discussion of one of the darkest issues facing America today."
