= Paul Nehlen =

American businessman, politician and white supremacist

- Born: May 9, 1969 (age 57); Ohio, United States
- Education: Widener University; University of Delaware (BA); University of Phoenix (MBA)
- Occupations: Politician, businessman
- Known for: White supremacist advocacy Running against Paul Ryan in Wisconsin's 1st congressional district
- Political party: Republican
- Spouse: Gabriela Lire
- Children: 2
- Website: Candidate website: electnehlen.com

Paul Nehlen (born May 9, 1969) is an American white supremacist and former Congressional candidate from Wisconsin. During the 2016 and 2018 Republican Party primary elections in Wisconsin's 1st congressional district, he spouted various racist, white nationalist, nativist, protectionist, and antisemitic views. In 2016 he was defeated by incumbent Paul Ryan by 84 to 16 percent. The 2018 primary was won by Bryan Steil; Nehlen came third.

An April 2018 article in The Daily Beast declared that Nehlen was becoming one of the highest profile white nationalists in the United States, but he has been unsuccessful politically, also losing the support of Breitbart News. His online accounts have been closed at Twitter and Gab because of his activities. Since early 2018 he has gained notice only for controversial remarks and largely disappeared from coverage in 2019.

== Early life ==
Nehlen was born in Ohio, and has lived in Delavan, Wisconsin since 2014.

He became a successful businessman and had stints at Deltech Engineering/United Dominion Industries and SPX Corporation. Until 2016, he served as the Senior VP of Operations at Neptune-Benson LLC, a subsidiary of Evoqua Water Technologies. He holds several patents related to filtering and manufacturing methods. In 2014, he registered a consulting business, Blue Skies Global LLC. It does not appear to have conducted any business to date. Nehlen was an advisory board member from the Midwest Region of Operation Homefront until 2016.

== Views ==
Nehlen has espoused alt-right, racist, white nationalist, nativist, protectionist, and antisemitic views. He has used white nationalist memes to spread his message. Nehlen frequently uses the slogan: "It's OK to be white." He was formerly backed by Steve Bannon. Nehlen endorsed Republican Roy Moore in the 2017 Alabama U.S. Senate special election. Some commentators have said his views and actions show he supports neo-Nazi ideology. He has also been endorsed by neo-Nazis, including the Daily Stormer, a neo-Nazi website operated by Andrew Anglin.

=== Lawful speech ===
On December 14, 2017, Nehlen's campaign for the 2018 congressional election released a statement calling for a federal law banning large social media companies from censoring or restricting 'lawful speech' (speech protected under the First Amendment to the United States Constitution) on their platforms. Nehlen's proposed bill includes fines of $500,000 for each violation. Supporters of Nehlen have used the hashtag #ShallNotCensor online to show their support for this position. Limitations to said speech would include "No publishing any individual's nonpublic residential address, telephone number, or email address without their consent". However, Nehlen's campaign has posted private phone and email addresses without their consent on the website and then tweeted a link to them.

=== Antisemitism ===
On Twitter, he suggested Ari Cohn convert to Christianity to "fill a Jesus-shaped hole" inside of him. Nehlen said he was reading The Culture of Critique (1998) by Kevin B. MacDonald and described it as "outstanding so far". He called John Cardillo and Kurt Schlichter "shekels-for-hire" and posted a tweet with the antisemitic catchphrase "The goyim know" (referencing a theory about an alleged Jewish conspiracy and Gentiles being aware of said conspiracy). In an attempt to provide a double standard, Nehlen sent a text message to The Washington Post, in which he stated: "I reject being called a White Supremacist, because clearly Pro-White isn't White Supremacy unless Pro-Jewish is Jewish Supremacy."

In a discussion with neo-Nazi Patrick Little on an alt-right podcast, Nehlen formally endorsed genocide. He is quoted as saying he wouldn't be "opposed to somebody ... leadin' a million Robert Bowers to the promised land."

=== Political opponents ===
Nehlen once posted on Twitter a picture of Paul Ryan and Randy Bryce being dropped out of a helicopter, a reference to death flights, a method of executing political opponents used by South American autocratic governments during the late 20th century.

=== Donald Trump ===
While running against incumbent Paul Ryan in the 2016 Republican primary for the seat representing Wisconsin's 1st congressional district, Nehlen was supportive of Donald Trump's presidential campaign, but was swamped by Ryan. By 2018, however, he was criticizing Trump, describing him as a "cuck" and a failure.

=== Meghan Markle ===
On February 9, 2018, Nehlen tweeted an image of Prince Harry offensively superimposing an image of the Cheddar Man over the face of his American, biracial fiance Meghan Markle, with the words "Honey, does this tie make my face look pale?" Nehlen was subsequently suspended from Twitter. He objected to this as a violation of his free speech.

=== Border wall and immigrants ===
In late February 2018, Nehlen was a guest on the radio show of David Duke, commenting to Duke that Trump's proposed border wall should include automatic turrets. Nehlen stated that any Mexican immigrant who approaches the American border should "be treated as an enemy combatant. Man, woman or child."

== Social media bans ==
In February 2018, after a series of racist and antisemitic tweets, he was permanently suspended, or banned from Twitter. The Republican Party of Wisconsin has cut off ties with Nehlen, saying that his "ideas have no place in the Republican Party".

In April 2018, Nehlen allegedly doxed alt-right people that he saw as too moderate, willing to compromise, or unwilling to take militant street action. Gab, an alt-tech platform, banned Nehlen for doxing a troll who went by the name Ricky Vaughn. After doxing the troll, who gained notoriety by posting popular racist and antisemitic memes, Nehlen claimed that the troll's real name is Douglass Mackey.

In May 2019, Facebook, Inc. banned Nehlen and other controversial right-wing figures, including Alex Jones, Milo Yiannopoulos, Laura Loomer, and Paul Joseph Watson from the company's platforms, including Facebook and Instagram.

== Political career ==
=== 2016 primary ===
For his run in the 2016 Wisconsin's 1st congressional district primaries, he received endorsements from Breitbart News and the Tea Party Patriots Citizens Fund and people such as Laura Ingraham and Sarah Palin. He was defeated, getting 16% of the votes versus Paul Ryan with 84% of the votes. When he posted a ballot selfie on election day, the Town of Delavan police said he had committed election fraud, a Class I felony. The police said he deliberately delayed an investigation by doing a factory reset on the phone and erasing the SIM card. Assistant District Attorney Haley Johnson said the ballot selfie was "technically a violation" of law, but decided not to issue criminal charges, stating Nehlen had "ignorantly posted the image to draw attention to his candidacy," and not vote buying. Johnson wrote "It is unfortunate that Mr. Nehlen showed such little regard for a law enforcement investigation."

=== 2018 primary ===
Nehlen ran again in the 2018 Republican primary against Nick Polce for the seat vacated by Paul Ryan, who was retiring. He was backed by Steve Bannon until Roy Moore was defeated. Nehlen has alienated Breitbart and has been strongly criticized by the group. On December 27, 2017, Bannon's adviser Arthur Schwartz said Nehlen is "dead to us" and "Bannon cut all ties with him and tossed him to the curb." Breitbart senior editor Joel Pollak said: "We don't support him." On December 27, Pollak tweeted that Breitbart had not covered Nehlen in months. On December 18, 2017, he was a featured guest on Curt Schilling's Breitbart radio show Whatever It Takes; Schilling unequivocally expressed his endorsement of Nehlen.

Callum Borchers of The Washington Post said "Breitbart's move is political calculus" because it "needs to align itself with politicians who can win to help regain the appearance of influence Moore's defeat damaged."

On February 13, 2018, Wisconsin GOP spokesman Alec Zimmerman said, "Nehlen and his ideas have no place in the Republican Party." Wisconsin Assembly Speaker Robin Vos said, "It looks to me like he's a racist bigot." Ryan's campaign spokesman Kevin Seifert said, "It has long been clear that Paul Nehlen holds bigoted views." Nehlen responded with, "I am a member of the Republican Party regardless of what their traitorous, spineless apparatchiks believe," adding his agenda should "be the centerpiece of the Republican Party."

== Personal life ==
Nehlen is married to Gabriela Lira; they have had no children together. He has two adult sons from a previous marriage.

== Electoral history ==
U.S. House of Representatives, Wisconsin's 1st district, Republican primary, 2016
Party	Candidate	Votes	%
Republican	Paul Ryan (incumbent)	57,364	84.06
Republican	Paul Nehlen	10,864	15.92
Scattering	N/A	15	0.02
Total		68,243	100

U.S House of Representatives, Wisconsin's 1st district Republican primary, 2018
Party	Candidate	Votes	%
Republican	Bryan Steil	30,883	51.6
Republican	Nick Polce	8,945	14.9
Republican	Paul Nehlen	6,635	11.1
Republican	Kevin Adam Steen	6,262	10.5
Republican	Jeremy Ryan	6,221	10.4
Republican	Brad Boivin	924	1.5
Total		59,870	100

== See also ==
- I Don't Speak German
