= Douglass Mackey =

American social media influencer (born 1989 or 1990)

Douglass Mackey (born 1989 or 1990) is an American alt-right social media influencer who posted under the alias Ricky Vaughn. In March 2023, he was convicted of conspiring to deprive citizens of their right to vote in the 2016 presidential election. In July 2025, Mackey's conviction was overturned after the U.S. Court of Appeals for the Second Circuit unanimously ruled that "the government failed to offer sufficient evidence that Mackey even viewed—let alone participated in" group messages with his alleged co-conspirators.

== Early life ==
Douglass Mackey grew up in Vermont and graduated from Harwood Union High School. He later graduated from Middlebury College in 2011 with a degree in economics. Afterwards, he worked as an economist for consulting firm John Dunham & Associates until he was fired in July 2016.

== 2016 presidential election ==
Mackey operated several Twitter accounts under the "Ricky Vaughn" persona, inspired by Charlie Sheen's character in the 1989 comedy film Major League. One of these accounts, @Ricky_Vaughn99, peaked around 58,000 followers. In February 2016, the MIT Media Lab identified @Ricky_Vaughn99 as the 107th most impactful influencer in the election, above NBC News, Stephen Colbert and Newt Gingrich. The account was described by the Southern Poverty Law Center as "one of the most prolific and longstanding alt-right personalities on Twitter". According to HuffPost and a team of data scientists, Vaughn was the top promoter of the @TEN_GOP Twitter account, which was controlled by the Russian Internet Research Agency.

Vaughn was part of several private pro-Trump group chats, where members brainstormed ways to influence the 2016 presidential election. They discussed ways to frame Hillary Clinton as a "warmonger" and to promote the narrative that Bernie Sanders had been "cheated" in the Democratic Party primaries, to stir his supporters' resentment against Clinton and the Democratic Party. Vaughn and others promoted the #DraftOurDaughters hashtag, and some inferred from this the meaning that Clinton would draft women into the military, when her position was that women should be required to register for the draft without implication that the draft should be activated, and made memes suggesting to left-leaning voters that their friends secretly intended to vote for Trump. The New York Times described these disinformation campaigns as being run with "surgical precision", as they looked for ways to make them more viral and "dissected changes in wording and colors to make their messages more effective".

In podcasts and interviews hosted by white nationalists, Vaughn explained that his radicalization started with the Ron Paul 2008 presidential campaign. Then, after the 2012 killing of Trayvon Martin, he became a believer in cultural Marxism and other antisemitic conspiracy theories. Vaughn said "I owe a lot to" Milo Yiannopoulos and Mike Cernovich, who were involved in Gamergate. During the 2016 election, Vaughn promoted several pro-Trump memes. Vaughn said that through Twitter, he aimed to "introduce ideas of racial consciousness" and "racial separatism" to mainstream conservatives.

In 2018, after a feud, Paul Nehlen revealed that Mackey was behind the Vaughn persona, and neo-Nazi Christopher Cantwell posted a recent photograph of Mackey. HuffPost confirmed Mackey's identity in an exposé.

=== Accusations of election interference and attempted voter suppression ===
In 2016, Mackey promoted internet memes claiming that it was possible to vote for Hillary Clinton through text messages; the memes were reportedly targeted at Black and Latino voters, and were designed to look like official Clinton campaign ads, reusing her campaign logo, slogans, and fine print. One of the memes said "Avoid the Line. Vote from Home." At least 4,900 people tried to vote by texting the number shown in the memes. Around the time Mackey promoted these memes, he discussed ways to "limit black turnout" and described black voters as "gullible".

Mackey was arrested in January 2021 for attempted voter suppression, alongside several alleged co-conspirators. The New York Times identified one of them as alt-right influencer Anthime Gionet, known online as Baked Alaska. Mackey was found guilty of conspiracy against rights by a federal jury in March 2023, facing up to 10 years in jail. In his trial, Mackey said that he had changed since 2016, and had started therapy in 2018. In October, he was sentenced to seven months in jail.

On December 4, 2023, Mackey's motion for release pending appeal was granted by the Second Circuit Court of Appeals, staying his surrender date. The court ordered that his appeal be expedited. Oral arguments were heard on April 5, 2024, before a panel of the Second Circuit Court of Appeals consisting of Judges Debra Ann Livingston, Reena Raggi, and Beth Robinson.

On July 9, 2025, the Second Circuit unanimously overturned Mackey's conviction, finding that the government had failed to provide sufficient evidence that Mackey had conspired with others, and there was no evidence that his tweets tricked anyone into voting improperly.

=== Post-arrest media interviews ===
After his conviction and sentencing, Mackey was interviewed by Tucker Carlson and Donald Trump Jr.

Carlson falsely claimed that Mackey was being jailed for "mocking Hillary Clinton on the internet", rather than for a voter suppression scheme. In a 2021 show, Carlson had described Mackey as a victim of political persecution and did not bring up Mackey's racist tweets, stating that "we have no idea what Doug Mackey’s views are". Donald Trump Jr. encouraged viewers to donate to Mackey's legal fund and said that Ricky Vaughn "may be my favorite Twitter account of all time".

Claims that Mackey had been jailed for merely criticizing Hillary Clinton were spread by Dinesh D'Souza and the online magazine The Post Millennial. The claims were rated "False" by USA Today.
