= United States House Select Committee on Economic Disparity and Fairness in Growth =

Select Committee on Economic Disparity and Fairness in Growth
Select committee
- Defunct United States House of Representatives; 117th Congress

History
- Formed: December 30, 2020
- Disbanded: January 3, 2023

Leadership
- Chair: Jim Himes (D); Since June 17, 2021
- Ranking Member: Bryan Steil (R); Since June 17, 2021

Structure
- Seats: 14
- Political parties: Majority (8): Democratic (8); Minority (6): Republican (6)

Jurisdiction
- Purpose: Develop legislative recommendations that would combat the crisis of income and wealth disparity in America.
- Senate counterpart: None

On December 30, 2020, Speaker of the United States House of Representatives Nancy Pelosi announced that the United States House of Representatives would create a select committee on "economic disparity and fairness in growth" to produce a report with legislative recommendations to address the worsening crisis of wealth and income inequality across the United States.

== Members, 117th Congress ==
Pelosi announced the committee's Democratic members on June 16, 2021, and they were formally appointed the following day.

Majority	Minority
Jim Himes, Connecticut, Chair; Marcy Kaptur, Ohio; Gwen Moore, Wisconsin; Vicente Gonzalez, Texas; Pramila Jayapal, Washington; Angie Craig, Minnesota; Alexandria Ocasio-Cortez, New York; Sara Jacobs, California	Bryan Steil, Wisconsin, Ranking Member; Warren Davidson, Ohio; Jodey Arrington, Texas; Stephanie Bice, Oklahoma; Kat Cammack, Florida; Byron Donalds, Florida
