= Jim Himes =

American businessman and politician (born 1966)

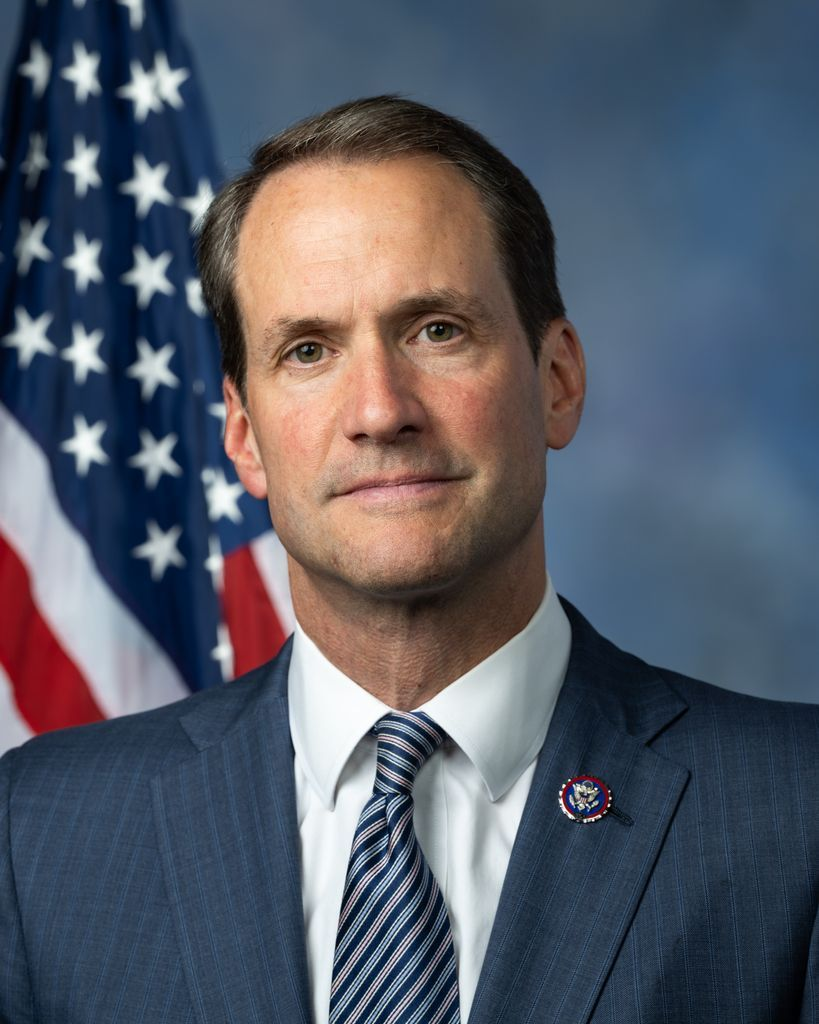
- Official portrait, 2023

Ranking Member of the House Intelligence Committee
- Incumbent
- Assumed office January 9, 2023
- Preceded by: Mike Turner

Chair of the House Fair Growth Committee
- In office June 17, 2021 – January 3, 2023
- Preceded by: Position established
- Succeeded by: Position abolished

Chair of the New Democrat Coalition
- In office January 3, 2017 – January 3, 2019
- Preceded by: Ron Kind
- Succeeded by: Derek Kilmer

Member of the U.S. House of Representatives from Connecticut's 4th district
- Incumbent
- Assumed office January 3, 2009
- Preceded by: Chris Shays

Personal details
- Born: James Andrew Himes; July 5, 1966 (age 60) Lima, Peru
- Party: Democratic
- Spouse: Mary Scott (m. 1994)
- Children: 2
- Education: Harvard University (BA); St Edmund Hall, Oxford (MPhil)
- Website: House website Campaign website
- Himes's voice Himes's opening statement at a House Intelligence Committee hearing involving former national security officials Recorded February 8, 2023

James Andrew Himes (born July 5, 1966) is an American businessman and politician serving as the U.S. representative for Connecticut's 4th congressional district since 2009. Himes is a member of the Democratic Party.

Himes's district includes most of the southwest corner of the state and is largely coextensive with the Connecticut side of the New York metropolitan area. It includes parts of Fairfield County and New Haven County, including the cities of Bridgeport, Norwalk, Fairfield and Stamford.

Himes is the ranking member of the House Permanent Select Committee on Intelligence, and a member of the House Financial Services Committee.

He previously chaired the United States House Select Committee on Economic Disparity and Fairness in Growth and the National Security, International Development and Monetary Policy Subcommittee of the House Financial Services Committee, and has been a member of the House Permanent Select Committee on Intelligence since 2013. In 2023, Himes became the Ranking Member on the House Permanent Select Committee on Intelligence. He also chaired the New Democrat Coalition in the 115th Congress (2017–2019).

== Early life and education ==
Himes was born on July 5, 1966, in Lima, Peru, to American parents. His father, James R. Himes, worked for the Ford Foundation in Lima. His father was also the director of the UNICEF Innocenti Center, a research institute on child development in Florence, Italy. His mother, Judith A. Himes, was until recently the director of board activities for the New Jersey Board of Higher Education in Trenton.

Himes spent his early childhood in Lima and Bogotá, Colombia. After his parents divorced, Jim, his mother, and his two sisters moved to Pennington, New Jersey, where he attended and graduated from Hopewell Valley Central High School.

Himes attended Harvard College, where he was the captain of the lightweight crew and graduated with a Bachelor of Arts in 1988. He studied for a degree in Latin American studies as a Rhodes scholar at St Edmund Hall, Oxford and graduated with a Master of Philosophy in 1990. He was awarded an honorary Doctor of Humane Letters degree from the University of Bridgeport on May 5, 2012.

== Early career ==
In 1995, Himes began working at Goldman Sachs as a banker in Latin America and New York. He was eventually promoted to vice president.

Himes was appointed commissioner of the Greenwich Housing Authority in 2002, and served for two years as chairman of the board. He has also served as a board member of Aspira of Connecticut in Bridgeport, a board member of the Fairfield County Community Foundation, and as an advisory board member of Family Assets, LLP of Bridgeport.

Himes was also an elected member of the Greenwich Board of Estimate and Taxation and chaired the Greenwich Democratic Town Committee.

== U.S. House of Representatives ==
=== Legislation ===
Himes has sponsored 75 bills.

On March 6, 2025, Himes was one of ten Democrats in Congress who joined all of their Republican colleagues in voting to censure Democratic congressman Al Green for interrupting President Donald Trump's State of the Union Address.

On September 19, 2025, Himes was one of 95 Democrats in Congress who joined all of their Republican colleagues in voting to honor the life and legacy of political activist Charlie Kirk.

=== Committee assignments ===
For the 119th Congress:

- Committee on Financial Services
- Permanent Select Committee on Intelligence (Ranking Member)

=== Caucus memberships ===
- Congressional UK Caucus (Co-chair)
- Congressional Ukraine Caucus
- Congressional Coalition on Adoption
- New Democrat Coalition
- Rare Disease Caucus
- Congressional Caucus on Turkey and Turkish Americans
- Congressional Arts Caucus
- Congressional Equality Caucus

== Political positions ==
=== Abortion ===
He voted against the Stupak-Pitts Amendment in the Affordable Health Care for America Act that was intended to prevent any federal funds from paying for any health care plan with abortion coverage.

=== Defense ===
In 2011, Himes' platform said that "we should reduce our presence in Afghanistan as rapidly as possible and reshape our mission to focus exclusively on counterterrorism" while requiring "presence in the region, but one considerably smaller than that required by our present strategy of nation-building." He believes in a world free of nuclear weapons, and readily supports sanctions against Iran. He voted for the Comprehensive Iran Sanctions, Accountability, and Divestment Act of 2010. He supports a two-state solution for Israel and Palestine.

He opposed the US airstrikes on Venezuela and the capture of President Nicolás Maduro by US forces in January 2026. Himes also said that, even though he is part of Congress's "Gang of Eight" – the bipartisan group of senior lawmakers usually briefed on national security matters – he was not told in advance about the Trump administration's military action.

Himes supported a 2026 renewal of Section 702 of FISA, allowing the government to surveil American citizens and residents while abroad.

=== Economics ===
In 2022, Himes was one of 16 Democrats to vote against the Merger Filing Fee Modernization Act of 2022, an antitrust package that would crack down on corporations for anti-competitive behavior.

In November 2025, Himes was the sole Representative from Connecticut to vote in favor of a Republican resolution to condemn socialism, put forth shortly after Zohran Mamdani won the 2025 New York City Mayoral Election. In explaining his vote, Himes claimed that the second Trump administration was "the most socialist administration in two and a half centuries", due to Trump's initiatives to take stakes in various private companies. Himes was denounced by the Connecticut chapter of the Democratic Socialists of America for this vote, which they called "a distraction".

=== Education ===
Himes believes that early childhood education is "the most intelligent investment a nation can make in its future" and voted to double funding for Early Head Start Program. He stated in 2008 that No Child Left Behind "is well-intentioned because it focuses on education, but it must be reformed." Himes also co-authored an amendment to the Student Aid and Fiscal Responsibility Act that promoted students' financial literacy.

=== Environment ===
He believes that "By creating the right set of financial incentives and supporting a broad range of research and development, we can deliver the energy our economy requires to thrive while protecting our planet." He also voted for the American Clean Energy and Security Act.

=== Gun issues ===
Himes voted against H.R. 627, which allowed loaded guns into national parks. The Brady Campaign to Prevent Gun Violence gives him a 100% lifetime score for his support of more gun regulations. Himes refuses to participate in moments of silence in the House chamber after mass shootings. He believes this honorary gesture for shooting victims is a negligence by Congress, because they could spend the time passing legislation to work on ending gun violence.

=== Health care ===
Himes supports the Affordable Care Act. He believes in preserving Medicare and Medicaid and says we must be "prepared to equitably reform these programs to address the challenging problem of rising health care costs and ensure that these important safety net programs are here to help this generation and the next."

=== Fourth Amendment ===
Himes voted against H.R. 2397, which was to defund the NSA domestic phone metadata spying program. He said he voted against the bill not because he objects to limiting the NSA's power, but because the bill was created in a reactionary manner and stripped the NSA of too much power.

=== Transportation ===
Himes co-sponsored H.R. 402, The National Infrastructure Development Bank Act of 2011, which would objectively fund national infrastructure projects. According to Himes, it would also "attract private investment and facilitate private sector partnering with regions, states and localities to borrow from the Bank while adding its own private equity to projects." He has helped bring money to the 4th district, such as "over $70 million for safety improvements, resurfacing, enhancements, and bridge improvements to the Merritt Parkway; over $11 million for infrastructure improvements at the Steel Point project in Bridgeport that will generate thousands of new jobs; and $30 million for upgrades to Metro North's Danbury Branch line."

=== Electoral College and presidential selection ===
In 2016, Himes lobbied the Electoral College to refuse to vote for Donald Trump and to instead elect Hillary Clinton. On December 12, 2016, in an interview on CNN's New Day, he said he was troubled by several of Trump's actions. The issue that "pushed me over the edge" was Trump's criticism of the CIA and the intelligence community. Himes admitted that Trump won "fair and square" but said that Trump had proved himself unfit for public office. He cited the intentions behind the creation of the electoral college and argued that it was created for an instance such as Trump's election.

=== Unidentified aerial phenomena (UAP) disclosure ===
In 2022, during the House intelligence committee's first hearing on UFOs in over 50 years, Himes asked the Pentagon if they could discuss their findings “in the service of sort of reducing speculation and conspiracy theories.”

On June 29, 2023, during an interview with Ask a Pol, Himes reacted skeptically to whistleblower David Grusch's testimony regarding a US Government run UAP Special access program. He asserted that "I was assured by all of the various units that there was no material.”

=== 2024 presidential nominee ===
On July 11, 2024, Himes called for Joe Biden to withdraw from the 2024 United States presidential election.

== Political campaigns ==
=== 2008 ===
Himes faced the ten-term Republican incumbent Chris Shays in the 2008 congressional election, along with Libertarian nominee M.A. Carrano, a professional philosophy writer and systems consultant, and Green Party nominee Richard Duffee. Himes defeated Shays, 51% to 47%. While Shays won 14 of the district's 17 towns, Himes won all three of the district's large cities—Bridgeport, Norwalk and Stamford. Ultimately, he owed his victory to swamping Shays in Bridgeport, winning 80% of the vote there. He was also helped by Barack Obama's massive win in that district; Obama carried the 4th with 60% of the vote, one of his largest margins in a Republican-held district.

Himes took office in the 111th United States Congress on January 6, 2009. He is the first Democrat to represent the district since Donald J. Irwin left office in 1969, and only the second since 1943. Shays was the sole Republican congressman from New England, and Himes's win made New England's House delegation entirely Democratic for the first time in history.

=== 2010 ===
In the 2010 election, Himes won reelection against Republican challenger State Senator Dan Debicella. Along with the three towns that he won in 2008, Himes also won Redding, Weston, and Westport, and won Fairfield by nine votes.

The campaign raised $3,660,498, $3,603,727 of which was spent. Only 4% of that came from small individual donors, while 60% came from large individual donors. The remaining donations came mostly from Political Action Committees (34%). Himes did not self-finance at all. The majority of his money, 74%, came from in-state. Only 26% came from out of state. Himes disclosed 97.9% of his donations.

=== 2012 ===
Himes was reelected, defeating Steve Obsitnik, 60% to 40%.

=== 2014 ===
In a rematch of the 2010 election, Himes again defeated Dan Debicella with 53.8% of the vote to Debicella's 46.2%.

=== 2016 ===
Himes defeated John Shaban with 59.9% of the vote to Shaban's 40.1%.

=== 2018 ===
Himes defeated Republican nominee Harry Arora, 61.2% to 38.8%.

=== 2020 ===
With 61.2% of the vote, Himes defeated Jonathan Riddle, Brian Merlen, and Yusheng Peng.

=== 2022 ===
Himes defeated Jayme Stevenson, 59.4% to 40.6%.

== Personal life ==
On October 15, 1994, Himes married Mary Lynley Scott, a designer. They live in the Cos Cob section of Greenwich with their two daughters.

== Electoral history ==
Democratic primary results, Connecticut 2008
Party	Candidate	Votes	%
Democratic	Jim Himes	12,260	86.95%
Democratic	L. Lee Whitnum	1,840	13.05%
Total votes		14,100	100%

Connecticut's 4th congressional district results, 2008
Party	Candidate	Votes	%
Democratic	Jim Himes	149,345	48.37%
Working Families	Jim Himes	9,130	2.96%
Total	Jim Himes	158,475	51.32%
Republican	Chris Shays (incumbent)	146,854	47.56%
Libertarian	Michael Anthony Carrano	2,049	0.66%
Green	Richard Duffee	1,388	0.45%
Write-in		10	0.00%
Total votes		308,776	100%
Democratic gain from Republican			

Connecticut's 4th congressional district results, 2010
Party	Candidate	Votes	%
Democratic	Jim Himes	110,746	50.95%
Working Families	Jim Himes	4,605	2.12%
Total	Jim Himes (incumbent)	115,351	53.06%
Republican	Dan Debicella	102,030	46.94%
Write-in		10	0.00%
Total votes		217,391	100%
Democratic hold			

Connecticut's 4th congressional district results, 2012
Party	Candidate	Votes	%
Democratic	Jim Himes	167,320	57.02%
Working Families	Jim Himes	8,609	2.93%
Total	Jim Himes (incumbent)	175,929	59.96%
Republican	Steve Obsitnik	117,503	40.04%
Write-in		10	0.00%
Total votes		293,432	100%
Democratic hold			

Connecticut's 4th congressional district results, 2014
Party	Candidate	Votes	%
Democratic	Jim Himes	101,401	51.01%
Working Families	Jim Himes	5,472	2.75%
Total	Jim Himes (incumbent)	106,873	53.76%
Republican	Dan Debicella	88,209	44.37%
Independent Party	Dan Debicella	3,713	1.87%
Total	Dan Debicella	91,922	46.24%
Write-in		5	0.00%
Total votes		198,800	100%
Democratic hold			

Connecticut's 4th congressional district results, 2016
Party	Candidate	Votes	%
Democratic	Jim Himes (incumbent)	187,811	59.90%
Republican	John Shaban	120,653	38.48%
Independent Party	John Shaban	5,071	1.62%
Total	John Shaban	125,724	40.10%
Write-in		5	0.00%
Total votes		313,540	100%
Democratic hold			

Connecticut's 4th congressional district results, 2018
Party	Candidate	Votes	%
Democratic	Jim Himes (incumbent)	168,726	61.21%
Republican	Harry Arora	103,175	37.43%
Independent Party	Harry Arora	3,746	1.36%
Total	Harry Arora	106,921	38.79%
Write-in		4	0.00%
Total votes		275,651	100%
Democratic hold			

Connecticut's 4th congressional district results, 2020
Party	Candidate	Votes	%
Democratic	Jim Himes (incumbent)	224,432	62.22%
Republican	Jonathan Riddle	130,627	36.21%
Independent Party	Brian Merlen	5,647	1.57%
Write-in		10	0.00%
Total votes		360,716	100%
Democratic hold			

Connecticut's 4th congressional district results, 2022
Party	Candidate	Votes	%
Democratic	Jim Himes (incumbent)	140,262	59.41%
Republican	Jayme Stevenson	93,329	39.53%
Independent Party	Jayme Stevenson	2,493	1.06%
Total	Jayme Stevenson	95,822	40.59%
Total votes		236,084	100%
Democratic hold			

Connecticut's 4th congressional district results, 2024
Party	Candidate	Votes	%
Democratic	Jim Himes (incumbent)	200,791	61.06%
Republican	Michael Goldstein	122,793	37.34%
Independent Party	Benjamin Wesley	5,273	1.60%
Total votes		328,857	100%
Democratic hold			

== See also ==
- Enterprise Community Partners

U.S. House of Representatives
Preceded by Chris Shays	Member of the U.S. House of Representatives from Connecticut's 4th congressional district 2009–present	Incumbent
New office	Chair of the House Fair Growth Committee; 2021–2023	Position abolished
Preceded by Mike Turner	Ranking Member of the House Intelligence Committee; 2023–present	Incumbent
Party political offices
Preceded by Ron Kind	Chair of the New Democrat Coalition; 2017–2019	Succeeded by Derek Kilmer
U.S. order of precedence (ceremonial)
Preceded by Brett Guthrie	United States representatives by seniority 67th	Succeeded by Tom McClintock
