= The Base (neo-Nazi group) =

American neo-Nazi paramilitary organisation

- Flag of The Base
- Founder: Rinaldo Nazzaro
- Leader: Justen Michael Watkins (2020-2021)
- Founded: June 2018; 8 years ago
- Dates active: 2018–present
- Country: Belgium, Bulgaria, Croatia, Denmark, France, Germany, Italy, Lithuania, Poland, the Netherlands, Romania, Russia, Serbia, Spain, Sweden, Ukraine, the UK and the US.
- Headquarters: Georgia, California; New York City; Great Lakes region
- Ideology: Neo-Nazism; White supremacy Accelerationism; Antisemitism
- Political position: Far-right
- Status: Active
- Size: 45 (on primary web forum); +50 (2019); 70 (2021)
- Website: thebase966874062.wordpress.com/ (defunct)

The Base is an international neo-Nazi organization and paramilitary training network formed in 2018 by Rinaldo Nazzaro. The group espouses accelerationist and white nationalist ideology. It is active in the United States, Canada, Australia, South Africa, and Europe, and designated as a terrorist organization in Canada, the United Kingdom, Australia, New Zealand, and the European Union.

The organization's founder was a former employee of the Federal Bureau of Investigation (FBI) and the Pentagon. The organization was originally based on Nazzaro's off-the-grid land in Washington state, but he soon migrated to Russia and started directing the group's activities from there.

== History ==
The group was founded in June 2018 by Rinaldo Nazzaro, who uses the pseudonyms Norman Spear and Roman Wolf. Nazzaro was reported to have bought several blocks of off-the-grid land in Washington state, United States, in 2018 for use as a survivalist training camp.

Nazzaro, who used to work for the FBI and the Pentagon, moved to Russia around the time he created The Base, and directs the group's activities from there. In November 2020, a feature-length interview with Nazzaro was broadcast on Russian state television.

== Ideology and status ==
The Base is a white nationalist accelerationist paramilitary group and training network. It advocates the formation of white ethnostates, a goal which it believes it can achieve via terrorism and the violent overthrow of existing governments. The group's vetting process serves to connect committed extremists with terroristic skills to produce real-world violence. It organizes "race war preppers" and operates "hate camps", or training camps. The group has links to the Atomwaffen Division and the Feuerkrieg Division, which are far-right extremist groups.

Nazzaro has characterized The Base as a "survivalism and self-defense network ... sharing knowledge and training to prepare for crisis situations", but he denies its connections to neo-Nazism. Nazzaro has stated that his goal is to "build a cadre of trainers across the country."

In April 2025, The Base solicited volunteers and offered financial rewards for attacks on power plants, military and police vehicles and government buildings in Ukraine, as well as for the assassination of Ukrainian military, police and political figures. This is the first time the group has demonstrated its alignment with the Kremlin's geopolitical objectives.

According to the Global Network on Extremism and Technology, the Ukrainian branch of The Base aims to create a White ethnostate in the Zakarpattia Oblast and there have been various "killings and acts of sabotage carried out by the group in the country". According to Nazzaro, most favorable situation for the creation of an ethnostate exists in the United States and Ukraine, with the current turmoil making Ukraine especially favorable and the rugged Carpathian terrain making it ideal for asymmetric warfare.

The Base has been designated as a terrorist entity by the following jurisdictions:

- Canada (February 3, 2021)
- United Kingdom (July 12, 2021)
- Australia (November 24, 2021)
- New Zealand (June, 2022)
- European Union (July 26, 2024)

== Recruitment strategies ==
The group is active across the United States, and it is also active in Canada. Before his identity was revealed in January 2020, Nazzaro, known online as "Roman Wolf" and "Norman Spear", was personally involved in active recruitment, with the aim of forming cells in Europe, South Africa and Australia.

The Base has recruited members by using iFunny, a meme social media website. In secure chat forums, Vice noted members designing memes to spread as propaganda.

Propaganda from a The Base training camp near Spokane, Washington was posted in August 2019.

In late 2019 and early 2020, secret recordings were made of some of The Base's recruitment activities. The tapes include its attempts to recruit several Australians, including a 17-year-old and a Western Australian man, Dean Smith, who ran for parliament for Pauline Hanson's One Nation party. Another Australian who went by the name of Volkskrieger was a key person in the recruitment drive, which focused on finding people with legal access to firearms and security licences.

== Activities ==
=== Antisemitic activities ===
Richard Tobin and The Base were linked to synagogue vandalism in Racine, Wisconsin, and Hancock, Michigan, which occurred a day apart in September 2019. Court documents allege that Tobin organized the vandalism, then named the two members of The Base who he assigned to vandalize the synagogues. Tobin called the event "Operation Kristallnacht".

Yousef O. Barasneh, a Neo-Nazi Arab whose father immigrated from Amman, spray-painted swastikas and other antisemitic symbols and slogans on Beth Israel Sinai Congregation in Racine, Wisconsin, sometime between September 15 and 23, 2019.

=== Virginia protests ===
On 16 January 2020, three members of The Base were arrested by the FBI just before a gun rights protest, 2020 VCDL Lobby Day, was scheduled to be held at the Virginia State Capitol in Richmond. The FBI had six members under surveillance for several months and had set up CCTV cameras inside the group's apartment to observe them and to prevent them from causing any harm. According to FBI documents, three members were discussing "the planning of violence at a specific event in Virginia, scheduled for January 20, 2020." On January 17, the trio were indicted for illicit activities. The next day, three additional members were arrested for plotting to "derail trains" and poison water supplies. FBI recordings released in November 2021 showed two of the men, Patrik Jordan Mathews and Brian Lemley, discussed mass murder of black persons to trigger a race war; they were both sentenced to nine years in prison in October 2021.

=== Other incidents ===
On the night of December 11, 2019, two members – Justen Watkins and Alfred Gorman – appeared at a residential home in the town of Dexter, Michigan. There, they shined lights and took photographs on the front porch. Watkins and Gorman incorrectly believed the home belonged to an "antifa" podcaster, Daniel Harper of I Don't Speak German, and the pair intended to threaten him. It was actually the home of an unrelated family. Watkins and Gorman uploaded their photos to a Telegram channel used by The Base. On October 29, 2020, Watkins and Gorman were apprehended by the FBI, and charged with gang membership, unlawful posting of a message, and using computers to commit a crime. According to Vice News, between the attempted intimidation incident and his arrest, leaked chat logs revealed Watkins was planning a "fortified compound" in the Upper Peninsula of Michigan. In the said logs, he was discussing plans to purchase homes and land (and subsequently fortify them) with members on Wire, wanting to establish an enclave to house and train members.

In the Netherlands, in October 2020, two 19-year-old men were arrested for their alleged membership of The Base. They were charged with right-wing extremist sedition and crimes with terrorist intent.

In January 2021, a man from Amsterdam and a man from Dordrecht were arrested for their participation in a messaging group linked to The Base. The Amsterdam man had threatened to assassinate Prime Minister Mark Rutte while he was out cycling, while the Dordrecht man had circulated messages encouraging racist and homophobic violence. Both were sentenced in December 2021 to 24 months in prison, 18 of which were suspended.

In April 2021, two men were indicted in Floyd County, Georgia, for alleged theft and ritual beheading of an animal. The assistant district attorney said a "dozen members of The Base" participated in the blood-drinking ritual.

In November 2023, an anti-terrorist police operation coordinated by Europol and Eurojust was carried out in six European countries (Belgium, Croatia, Italy, Lithuania, the Netherlands and Romania) against The Base. Five suspects were arrested and seven others questioned. Police seized weapons, Nazi material and computer data. In Belgium, two people were arrested in Ostend and Diepenbeek, one of whom, described as a "leader", was charged with spreading terrorist messages and attempted recruitment.

In September 2024, three men were arrested in the Netherlands on suspicion of belonging to The Base. The suspects were charged with incitement to terrorism via Internet discussions.

The same month, the Italian police arrested an 18-year-old and placed under surveillance a 20-year-old of Romanian origin, both suspected of having links with The Base. They are also linked to the Russian accelerationist network Aast. The youngest, already known for threatening a classmate with a knife after praising Hitler, is also involved in child pornography and sextortion. The 20-year-old suspect is said to have actively disseminated neo-Nazi, anti-Semitic and pro-Russian propaganda, while encouraging the use of weapons and homemade explosives against those whom the Aast network considers "subhuman": non-whites, Muslims and enemies of the neo-Nazi accelerationist cause.

In February 2025, a 15-year-old British teenager was accused of planning a terrorist attack and belonging to The Base. He denied the charges and is due to appear in court on March 14, 2025.

In July 2025, the group's Ukrainian branch, the White Phoenix, claimed responsibility for the killing of Ivan Voronych, a colonel in the Security Service of Ukraine, in Kyiv on 10 July.

In December 2025, a raid coordinated by Europol and the Guardia Civil in Spain arrested 3 suspected members of The Base and seized equipment including 2 firearms, various bladed and blunt weapons, tactical equipment used in training activities and Nazi material.

In February 2026, the group's Ukrainian branch, claimed responsibility for a car bombing in Odesa. They implied the “border service” officer who was killed was assisting Russia.

== Notable members ==
=== Rinaldo Nazzaro ===
Rinaldo Nazzaro uses the pseudonyms Norman Spear and Roman Wolf. Nazzaro used to work for the FBI as an analyst and he also used to work as a contractor for the Pentagon, and he also claims to have served in Iraq and Afghanistan. Nazzaro owned a security contracting firm, Omega Solutions International LLC. He is a white supremacist and a supporter of the Northwest Territorial Imperative, which proposes the creation of "a separatist ethnostate in the Pacific north-west".

Nazzaro resides with his wife in Saint Petersburg, Russia, according to BBC News; an apartment in the city was purchased in his wife's name in July 2018, the same month in which The Base was founded. A video posted online in May 2019 shows Nazzaro, apparently in Russia, wearing a t-shirt with an image of President Vladimir Putin and the words "Russia, absolute power". The BBC also reported that in 2019, Nazzaro was listed as a guest at a Russian government security exhibition in Moscow. In November 2020, a feature-length interview with Nazzaro was broadcast on Russian state television. Some members of The Base suspected that Nazzaro is connected to Russian intelligence, which Nazzaro denies.

In February 2025, following President Donald Trump's appointment of Kash Patel as the new Director of the FBI, The Guardian reported that The Base was ramping up recruitment in the US. Shortly after, fresh allegations surfaced that Nazzaro is a Russian spy.

=== Justen Michael Watkins ===
Justen Michael Watkins was the leader of The Base from 2020 until 2021 when Rinaldo Nazzaro retook leadership of the group and reconfigured it in April 2021 to "protect it from infiltrators". In October 2020, he was charged in connection to an incident in December 2019 in which he encouraged (via messages) other members of The Base to target a family's home. It was later discovered that he and two other members had entered two abandoned properties formerly operated by the Michigan Department of Corrections in Caro to host firearm drills. Regarding the activity in MDoC property, Justen Michael Watkins was charged with:

- One count of larceny in a building (4-year felony)
- One count of gang membership (20-year felony)
- One count of conspiracy to train with firearms for a civil disorder (4-year felony)
- One count of felony firearm (2-year felony).

On April 11, 2022, he pled guilty to conspiracy to train for a civil disorder and felony firearm in a plea agreement stipulating that he will serve 32 months to 4 years of incarceration and a second consecutive sentence of two years. In his plea, Watkins admitted that he visited the MDoC facility to perform firearms training there with multiple others. He was then sentenced in accordance with the plea agreement.

On March 29, 2024, the Michigan Supreme Court denied Watkins's appeal (he was 26 at that time). The Michigan Court of Appeals reversed a decision earlier in May 2023 from the Tuscola County Circuit Court that granted Watkins a resentencing.

As of 2024, Watkins is serving his sentence at Bellamy Creek Correctional Facility as a Level 4 inmate.

=== Luke Austin Lane ===
Luke Austin Lane was a cell leader of The Base and an Order of Nine Angles follower. His cell consisted of a few members in Georgia and was particularly militant. He practiced firearms training with his cell, videoing their activities and posting the film online for propaganda purposes. In January 2020, Lane and two accomplices, Jacob Oliver Kaderli and Michael John Helterbrand were arrested for and later convicted of stockpiling weapons and plotting to kill a couple they thought were anti-fascist and their young children. In preparation, Lane, along with dozen other people, engaged in paramilitary training, consumed psychedelic drugs, sacrificed a ram, and drank its blood in an occult ritual on his property.

=== Others ===
==== Jason Lee Van Dyke ====
Jason Lee Van Dyke, the former lawyer and one-time leader of the Proud Boys, was alleged in 2020 to have tried to plot the assassination of a rival, attempted to join the Base, but was denied membership for being a "huge liability". In an effort to convince the group's leaders that he should be allowed to join the Base and would be a productive member, Van Dyke offered his expertise in weapons training and his property in Decatur, Texas, for a paramilitary camp.

==== Patrik Jordan Mathews ====
A combat engineer master corporal, Patrik Jordan Mathews (a.k.a. Dave Arctorum or "coincidence detector") of the Canadian Armed Forces Reserve, was identified as one of the three arrested. Earlier, on 16 August 2019, Mathews had been outed as organizing a terrorist cell for The Base and Atomwaffen in Manitoba via undercover reporting by the Winnipeg Free Press. He was also described as putting up posters to "intimidate and threaten local anti-fascist activists". Other posters in Manitoba, which began appearing in July, stated "Save your Race, Join The Base" and "The Base: Learn Train Fight". Vice News also discovered he had participated in a training camp in the U.S. state of Georgia. On August 19, the RCMP searched his home in Beausejour, Manitoba and seized guns. The military had been alerted about Mathews in April and launched an investigation in July. By August 24, he had gone missing and was reported as being voluntarily released from the Forces.

Mathews' truck was found near the border in Piney, Manitoba, and it was assumed he had entered the United States illegally. It is possible Mathews was assisted by a Minnesota cell of The Base. Arrested in January 2020, Mathews and Brian M. Lemley Jr., 33, pleaded guilty to weapons charges in Greenbelt, Maryland, and were sentenced in October 2021 to nine years in prison. William G. Bilbrough IV, 19, was sentenced to five years for illegally bringing the Canadian into the USA.

== See also ==
- Antisemitism by country
  - Antisemitism in Canada
  - Antisemitism in Europe
  - Antisemitism in the United States
    - History of antisemitism in the United States
- Atomwaffen Division
- Ecofascism
- Far-right politics
  - Far-right subcultures
- Fascism in Europe
- Fascism in North America
  - Fascism in Canada
  - Fascism in the United States
- National Alliance (United States)
- National Socialist Movement (United States)
- Nazism in the Americas
- Radical right (Europe)
- Radical right (United States)
- Right-wing terrorism
- Stochastic terrorism
- Völkisch movement
- List of fascist movements
  - List of fascist movements by country
- List of Ku Klux Klan organizations
- List of neo-Nazi organizations
- List of organizations designated by the Southern Poverty Law Center as hate groups
- List of white nationalist organizations
