= Tom Kawcyznski =

American white supremacist

Tom Kawcyznski is a white separatist who produces a coronavirus-related podcast which has been criticized for pushing misinformation. Kawcyznski was town manager of Jackman, Maine until he was fired for promoting white supremacist content on social media.

== Podcasting ==
Kawcyznski began producing the podcast "Coronavirus Central" in 2020. In this podcast, Kawcyznski brands himself as a coronavirus expert, though he has been criticized for spreading incorrect, alarmist, and conspiracy-laden content, including the unproven idea that COVID-19 was engineered in a lab. The podcast has also been criticized in terms of quality, with Vulture describing it as "long and poorly edited, packed with rambles and recitations of scientific papers of dubious fidelity." This podcast has attracted considerable viewing, rising as high as fifth spot on Apple's 'Health & Fitness' chart in February 2020 and remaining largely in the top twenty podcasts in that category. Kawcyznski claims that his podcast receives around twenty-thousand listeners per episode (though this claim cannot be easily verified). The podcast argued that the government is incompetent and supported several conspiracy theories about the coronavirus, including that it was man-made.

Kawcyznski has also guested on others' podcasts. In January 2020, he joined on Christopher Cantwell's podcast, a white supremacist who came to prominence following the 2017 Charlottesville Unite the Right rally.

== White separatism ==
Kawcyznski has expressed beliefs described by various outlets as a white separatist or white nationalist. The Southern Poverty Law Center describes New Albion, a white separatist group Kawcyznski started, as a white nationalist hate group. Kawcynzski was fired in January 2018 after less than a year as town manager of Jackman, Maine due to his posts on social media calling for racial segregation and condemning Islam.

Kawcyznski argues that he is not racist, not a white supremacist, and not anti-Islam. He argues that his view are misrepresented and that he accepts anyone whose culture is "rooted in western civilization."

The Anti-Defamation League (ADL) notes that, though Kawcyznski's views align with those of the alt-right, he chooses to deliberatively obfuscate his beliefs in most public spaces. However, argues the ADL, Kawcyznski speaks more clearly on Gab, where he makes more clearly racist statements and at times talks explicitly about his communication strategy. He said in 2017, "I’m putting a happy face on #AltRight thinking that brings normies in."

== Personal life ==
Crash Barry describes some details of Kawcyznski's personal life in a profile for Mainer News. He notes that Kawcyznski was born in Arizona in 1980 and graduated from Swarthmore College in 2003. Kawcyznski has worked in a variety of positions, including in procurement for a construction company in New Hampshire. Kawcyznski is married to Dana Steele. Barry describes Steele as more blatant in her neo-Nazi views than Kawcyznski, and Kawcyznski has said on Gab that Steele "is considerably more radical" than he is.

Barry notes that, following college, Kawcyznski launched two short-lived political runs. He first rang for Congress as Libertarian, and later ran for the Pennsylvania House of Representatives. In both cases, he left the race before Election Day. Kawcyznski later moved to New Hampshire to join the Free State Project, an effort launched with the goal to create a libertarian stronghold. While in New Hampshire, he volunteered as a state campaign organizer for Donald Trump.

In 2017 Kawcyznski moved from Arizona to Jackman, Maine, a town of 1000 near the US-Canada border. He argues that he identifies as neither Republican nor Democrat, though he voted for Donald Trump in the 2016 election.
