= IFunny =

Meme website

iFunny
- Logo as of 2014
- Developers: iFunny Inc., FunCorp, Okrujnost
- Release: 26 April 2011
- Operating system: iOS; iPadOS; Android; Web browser
- Available in: English; Portuguese
- Type: Humor
- Website: ifunny.co

iFunny is a humor-based website and mobile application developed by Cyprus-based FunCorp, an entertainment technology company, that consists of memes in the form of images, videos, and animated GIFs submitted by its users. The mobile version of the site once featured a built-in meme creator tool. The app describes itself as a "community for meme lovers and viral memes around the internet."

== History ==
The application first launched on 26 April 2011 for iOS devices, and on 25 November 2011 for Android. On 11 April 2013, iFunny.co went up as the desktop alternative to the application. In the US Mobile App Report, iFunny was listed as one of the most downloaded apps in the US and as of 2023 has been downloaded over 70 million times in the United States.

== Content ==
iFunny is available on the web and as an app. It is divided into sections curated by moderators, and includes a section to follow subscribed accounts. It is run by David Chef, known as Cheffy by the iFunny community.

Along the left side of the homepage is the "memes catalog", in which general topics are listed including cars, gaming, and sports.

The site has guidelines that ban threats and hateful propaganda, but they do allow "dark humor". It claims to use "manual pre-moderation" to filter content that violates its guidelines. iFunny's policies allow political satire and opinion, but prohibit support for specific parties or candidates. The site offers a safety lock to prevent others from seeing what memes users have looked at.

== Extremist incidents ==
Some users and content on the website have been associated with extremist ideologies.

According to Vice News in November 2019, the neo-Nazi hate group The Base was posting recruitment propaganda on iFunny. One user, using the alias "MemeMercenary", posted QR codes to encourage users to contact the extremist group.

On 12 January 2018, 20-year-old Samuel Woodward was arrested and charged with first-degree murder for the stabbing of Blaze Bernstein. Woodward is a member of the neo-Nazi terrorist group Atomwaffen Division. Woodward had a large following on iFunny under the moniker "Saboteur", and often posted content that was racist, violent, or related to white supremacy. He had drifted away from iFunny in the last year and deleted the "Saboteur" account. iFunny users turned Bernstein's death into a meme and showed support for Woodward.

On 7 August 2019, 18-year-old Justin Olsen from Boardman Township, Ohio, was arrested for making posts on iFunny under his username "ArmyofChrist" that threatened federal agents over their heavily criticized response during the 1992 Ruby Ridge standoff. His account had nearly 6k subscribers at the time of his arrest, and on it he glorified mass shootings and fantasized over a holy war between Christians and Muslims. The FBI found over 10,000 rounds of ammunition and 25 guns at his home that he shared with his parents, all of which were legally registered in his father's name. He told authorities that the posts he made were in a joking manner. Olsen was subsequently released from jail with 3 years probation in July 2020.

On 16 August 2019, the FBI arrested 19-year-old Farhan Sheikh for iFunny posts threatening to murder people at a women's health clinic that was less than 5 miles away from his home. On a post, he wrote that he would "proceed to slaughter and murder any doctor, patient or visitor." He posted that his iFunny account was "NOT a satirical account. I post what I mean, and i WILL carry out what I post [sic]".

On 28 May 2020, 19-year-old Alexander Treisman was initially arrested for carrying concealed weapons and was separately indicted for possession of child pornography, but was later discovered to have made posts on Reddit and iFunny threatening to assassinate Joe Biden and Kamala Harris. In one iFunny post, he said, "Should I kill Joe Biden?". He was found in a van with four rifles, a 9mm handgun, explosive materials, and books on bomb making. Police subsequently found 6,721 images and 1,248 videos of child pornography on eight different digital devices.

On 12 March 2021, 21-year-old Joshua Doctor from Holland, Michigan, was arrested and charged with terrorism for making death threats towards Joe Biden, Nancy Pelosi, and Gretchen Whitmer on iFunny. In the posts, he wrote that he would "be the catalyst" for a revolution. Bomb-making instructions were found on his smartphone, according to prosecutors. According to Chief Information Officer Denis Litvinov, the post violated the platform's policies and guidelines against violence.
