= Nick R. Martin =

American freelance journalist

Nick R. Martin is an American freelance journalist.

Martin was a staff reporter for Phoenix, Arizona's East Valley Tribune and covered the trial of Dale Hausner, known as the Serial Shooter, until being laid off from the Tribune. He then founded and ran Heat City to continue covering the trial and to provide independent reporting for the region, receiving several Arizona Press Club first-place awards in 2009.

Martin was then hired for Talking Points Memo in 2011.

Martin has also written for Arizona Guardian, BuzzFeed, The Daily Beast, Southern Poverty Law Center.

In 2019, Martin launched the newsletter The Informant, to continue his muckraking of racists and hate groups.
