= Jeremy Ryan =

Liberal (born 1988)

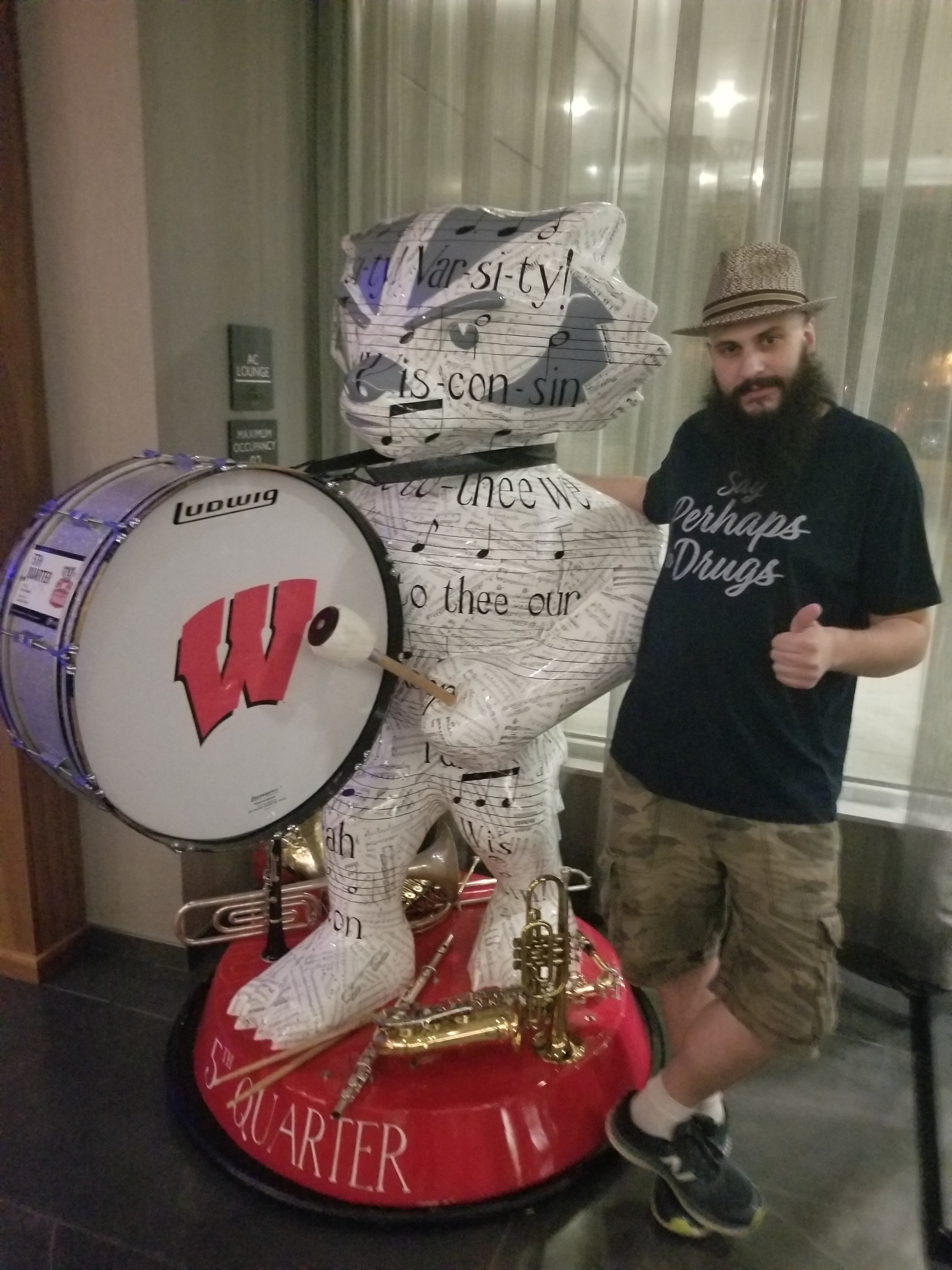
- Born: August 29, 1988 (age 37); Dubuque, Iowa, U.S.
- Other names: Segway Jeremy, NFT Demon

Jeremy Ryan, referred to by conservatives media as "Segway Boy", is an American protester and NFT artist. He is also known widely under his trade name of NFT Demon. The protests were against Scott Walker's Act 10. Ryan became notable during his frequent protests at the Wisconsin State Capitol in Madison. He often used a segway vehicle to get around the capitol, earning him the name, "Segway Jeremy". Ryan is the founding director of Defending Wisconsin Political Action Committee, that took part in the attempt to recall Governor Scott Walker in 2011–2012. Ryan was first known for his continuous protests against Wisconsin Department of Administration's rules prohibiting the use of signs in the rotunda. The rules were later revoked. He supports marijuana legalization.

== Personal life ==
Ryan moved to Madison, Wisconsin after graduating high school.

Ryan ran a business called Cells R' Us Global Wholesaling and Consulting. He was also the owner of a window tinting shop called Tint Tek Window Tinting.

== Protest activity ==
In 2011, Ryan was involved in the protests against Governor Scott Walker's collective bargaining reforms legislation.

Ryan was arrested several times and charged with disorderly conduct in connection with various protests. Ryan and five other arrested protesters filed a lawsuit against the state's Department of Administration for wrongful arrest. In 2015, they were collectively awarded $45,000 in damages by Dane County's Judge Frank Remington.

== Legal issues ==
In 2012, Ryan was charged with receiving stolen property. A stolen Capitol Police jacket was found in his apartment while he was unconscious. He admitted he possessed the jacket and wore it to parties as a joke. In 2013, as part of a plea agreement, the stolen property charge and three other misdemeanor cases were dismissed.

Ryan was also charged for disorderly conduct outside of the Capitol Press room, now known as the Dick Wheeler press room. Ryan often taunted Gwen Guenther when she took over her father's "The Wheeler Report", after his death.

In 2016, Ryan was arrested drug charges. In a plea agreement the next year, he was sentenced to 20 days in jail and fined $518.

In October 2018, Ryan was arrested in Black Earth, Wisconsin, on charges of attempting to purchase "a lethal dose of a radioactive substance" with the intent to cause death. His attorneys stated that, after learning his cancer was in remission, he was attempting to purchase the substance in order to commit suicide should his cancer return. The charge of attempted "nuclear terrorism" was dismissed in February 2020; On February 12, 2020, Ryan pleaded guilty to unlawfully attempting to purchase radioactive material; he was sentenced to time served and was released.

In June 2020, while still on supervised release for his previous conviction, Ryan was arrested and charged with making terrorist threats against Dane County Sheriff Dave Mahoney and his family. The offending messages were related to protests in Madison. Ryan allegedly posted on Facebook the home address of the sheriff as well as some of his family in a demand that they release Madison protest leader Devonere Johnson, also known as Yeshua Musa, whose arrest prompted violent protests on the night of June 23. The charges of making terroristic threats and stalking were eventually dismissed and Ryan was still charged with disorderly conduct, threatening injury or harm with a computer message and unlawful phone use. He was given time served. According to a press report Ryan was on the Federal Terrorism watch list at the time of his arrest.

== Campaigns ==
=== 2012 ===
In 2012, Ryan unsuccessfully ran for Wisconsin State Assembly District 76 under the "Individual Party".

=== 2014 ===
Despite his several protests against Republican policies and elected officials, he unsuccessfully ran in the Republican primary for Wisconsin's 1st congressional district against Paul Ryan.

According to Jeremy Ryan, he chose to run against Paul Ryan because they shared the same last name. He also declared his intention in taking the party back to its roots.

Before the 2014 election was conducted, State Republican party officials asked for Jeremy Ryan to be disqualified from contesting the primary. They argued that he misled prospective voters into signing his nomination papers thinking they were signing to legalize marijuana.

The accountability board later approved his candidacy stating that the complaint lacked sufficient evidence to kick him off the ballot.

=== 2018 ===
Jeremy Ryan declared to run for 2018 Wisconsin's 1st Congressional District Republican Primary to replace Paul Ryan in the United States House of Representatives. In this race he described himself as a Progressive Republican. His largest issue was legalization of cannabis, which he can be seen smoking in his campaign videos, in some of which he also appears to be drunk.

=== 2020 ===
Ryan briefly attempted to run for Congress in the Republican primary for Wisconsin's 1st congressional district in 2020, but did not obtain the necessary signatures to make the ballot.
