= Beloit College =

Liberal arts college in Beloit, Wisconsin, US

- Motto: Scientia Vera Cum Fide Pura (Latin)
- Motto in English: True knowledge with pure faith
- Type: Private liberal arts college
- Established: 1846; 180 years ago
- Accreditation: HLC
- Academic affiliations: ACM; Oberlin Group; CLAC; WAICU
- Endowment: $85.6 million in 2025
- President: Eric Boynton
- Faculty: 94
- Undergraduates: 997 (2025)
- Location: Beloit, Wisconsin, U.S. 42.503°N 89.031°W
- Campus: Urban, 65 acres (26.3 ha)
- Colors: Blue and gold
- Sporting affiliations: NCAA Division III – MWC
- Mascots: Buccaneer (official), Turtle (unofficial)
- Website: www.beloit.edu
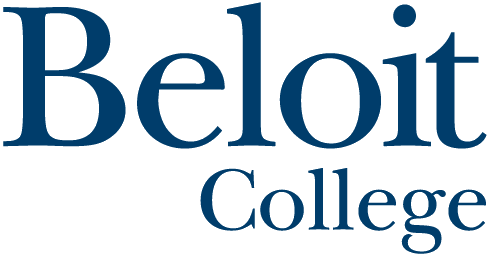

Beloit College is a private liberal arts college in Beloit, Wisconsin, United States. Founded in 1846 when Wisconsin was still a territory, it is the state's oldest continuously operated college. It has an enrollment of roughly 1,000 undergraduate students.

== History ==
Beloit College was founded by the group Friends for Education, which was started by seven pioneers from New England who, soon after their arrival in the Wisconsin Territory, agreed that a college needed to be established. The group raised funds for a college in their town and convinced the territorial legislature to enact the charter for Beloit College on February 2, 1846. The first building (then called Middle College) was built in 1847, and remains in operation. Classes began in the fall of 1847, with the first degrees awarded in 1851.

Beloit's first president was Aaron Lucius Chapin, who served from 1849 to 1886.

The college became coeducational in 1895. In 1904, Grace Ousley became the first African-American woman to graduate from the college.

Although independent today, Beloit College was historically, though unofficially, associated with Congregationalism.

The college remained very small for almost its entire first century, with enrollment topping 1,000 students only with the influx of World War II veterans in 1945–46. The "Beloit Plan" was a year-round curriculum introduced in 1964 that comprised three full terms and a "field term" of off-campus study. The trustees returned to the two-semester program in 1978.

== Campus ==
Beloit's campus is within the Near East Side Historic District.

The campus has 20 conical, linear, and animal effigy mounds built between about 400 and 1200, created by Native Americans identified by archaeologists as Late Woodland people. One of the mounds, in the shape of a turtle, inspired Beloit's symbol and unofficial mascot. The mounds on Beloit's campus are "catalogued" burial sites, and therefore may not be disturbed without a Wisconsin Historical Society permit. Several of the Beloit College sites have been partially excavated and restored, and material found within them—including pottery and tool fragments—is held in the college's Logan Museum of Anthropology.

In 2008 Beloit College completed a 120,000 sq ft (11,000 m^{2}) Center for the Sciences, which was named the Marjorie and James Sanger Center for the Sciences in 2017. The building was awarded LEED (Leadership in Energy and Environmental Design) green building certification. It also won a Design Excellence Honor Award in Interior Architecture from the Chicago chapter of the American Institute of Architects (AIA) in 2009.

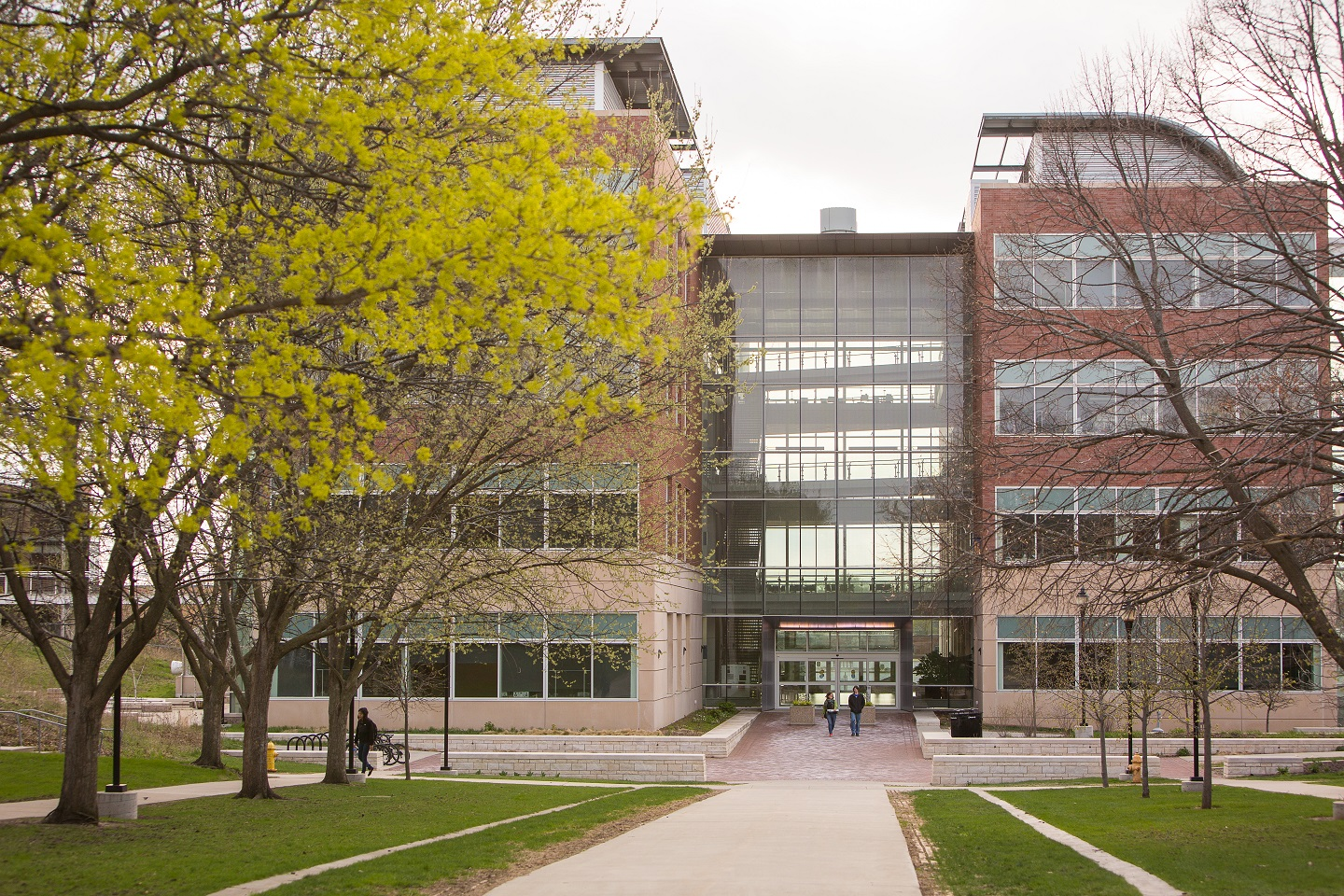
Marjorie and James Sanger Center for the Sciences

In 2010, Beloit College opened the Hendricks Center for the Arts, a 58,000-square-foot (5,400 m^{2}) structure with dance, music, and theater facilities. The building previously held the Beloit Post Office and later the Beloit Public Library. The renovation and expansion of the facility is the largest single gift in the college's history. The building is named after Diane Hendricks, chair of ABC Supply of Beloit, and her late husband and former college trustee Ken Hendricks.

Two Beloit campus museums open to the public are run by college staff and students. The Logan Museum of Anthropology and the Wright Museum of Art were founded in the late 19th century. The Logan Museum, accredited by the American Alliance of Museums, curates over 300,000 ethnographic and archaeological objects from 125 countries and over 600 cultural groups. The Wright Museum's holdings of over 8,000 objects include a large collection of original prints and Asian art. Both museums feature temporary special exhibitions year-round.

The Beloit College campus shows two sculptures by artist Siah Armajani, Gazebo for One Anarchist: Emma Goldman 1991 and The Beloit College Poetry Garden.

== Academics ==
Academic rankings

Liberal arts
- U.S. News & World Report: 95
- Washington Monthly: 63

National
- Forbes: 458

Beloit College is a four-year college that offers over 70 undergraduate majors, minors, and programs. Beloit also partners with other higher educational institutions, like Blackhawk Technical College, Johns Hopkins School of Nursing, Marquette University, Des Moines University, University of Wisconsin-Milwaukee, Medical College of Wisconsin, to offer continuing education pathways and accelerated degree offerings.

Beloit offers over 70 undergraduate majors, minors, and programs. The college's average class size is around 12 students, with one-third of courses having 10 or fewer students.

Academic strengths include field-oriented disciplines such as anthropology and geology. Its three most popular majors, by 2025 graduates, were Social Sciences, Business/marketing, and Physical sciences, a slight shift from 2021's most popular majors Biology/Biological Sciences, Psychology, and Business/Managerial Economics. In 2012, the college ranked among the top 20 American liberal arts colleges whose graduates go on to earn a Ph.D.

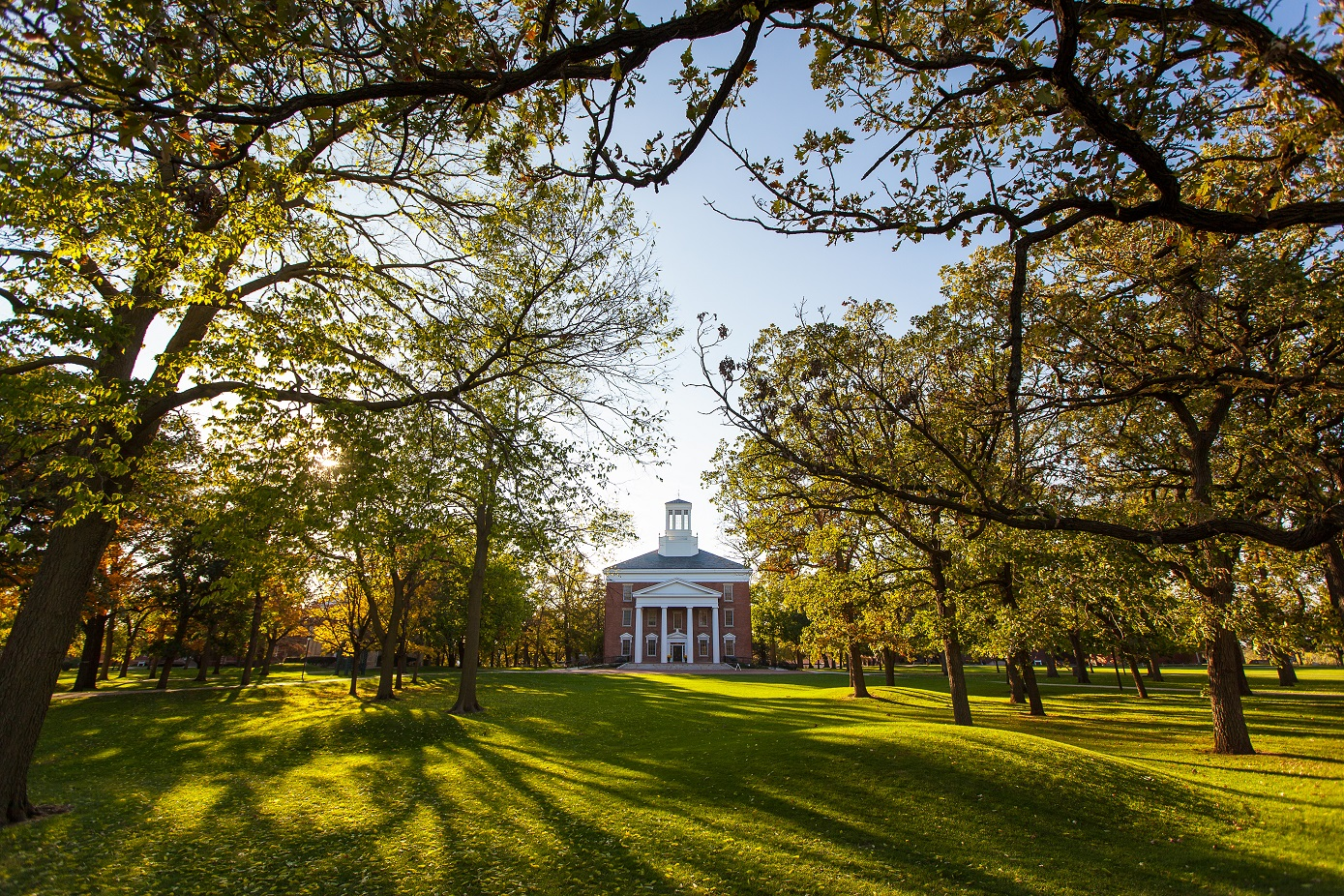
Middle College overlooking the Beloit campus

=== Schools ===
Beginning in late 2023, Beloit launched five schools within the college.

==== School of Business ====
The School of Business launched late 2023, focusing on an interdisciplinary business curriculum aligning with its liberal arts core. It operates out of Pearson's Hall, which was part of the college's $20 million investment in renovating campus spaces. The director of the School of Business is Diep Phan, a professor of economics and business at Beloit since 2009.

The college's Center for Entrepreneurship, known as CELEB, is a student-driven program housed off-campus. The space includes an entrepreneurship lab, public art gallery, TV & media lab, recording studio, and maker lab.

==== School of Health Sciences ====
The School of Health Sciences at Beloit opened alongside the School of Business in late fall 2023/early 2024. It is home to major paths focused in the healthcare field. The school also partners with other local institutions to provide various paths to health-related fields. In November 2023, Beloit partnered with the Medical College of Wisconsin in Milwaukee to provide a path toward a Pharmacy Doctorate Degree. In October 2025, Beloit partnered with neighboring state Des Moines University to offer various pathways from bachelors to graduate-level health science degrees. Beloit also partnered with Edgewood University in 2024 to offer dual-degree RN to BSN program.

==== School of Environment and Sustainability ====
The School of Environment and Sustainability launched in 2024 and is home to degree paths aimed at environmental study and sustainability impact.

The geology department continues a tradition that began with Thomas Chrowder Chamberlin more than a century ago. It combines a course load with field methods and research. The department is a member of the Keck Geology Consortium, a research collaboration of several similar colleges across the United States, including Amherst College, Pomona College, and Washington and Lee University. The consortium sends undergraduate students worldwide to research and publish their findings.

==== School of Global & Public Service ====
The School of Global and Public Service launched in November 2024 and is home to its majors that focus on public, private, and non-profit social justice and human rights advocacy.

==== School of Media and the Arts (SoMA) ====
The School of Media and the Arts is home to the college's various artistic and visual majors. The Hendricks Center for the Arts is home to SoMA, which houses studios, performance spaces, and other campus activities.

== Student life ==
Beloit students' housing options range from substance-free dormitories to special interest houses, such as the Art, Spanish, Outdoor Environmental Club (OEC), and interfaith options. Beloit College has fraternities and sororities. The school also has over 45 student organizations and clubs. As of 2022, there is a creative writing club called the Aardvark Authors.

The student newspaper, The Round Table, was founded in 1853 as the Beloit Monthly. The student radio station, WBCR-FM, operates at 88.3 MHz and streams online.

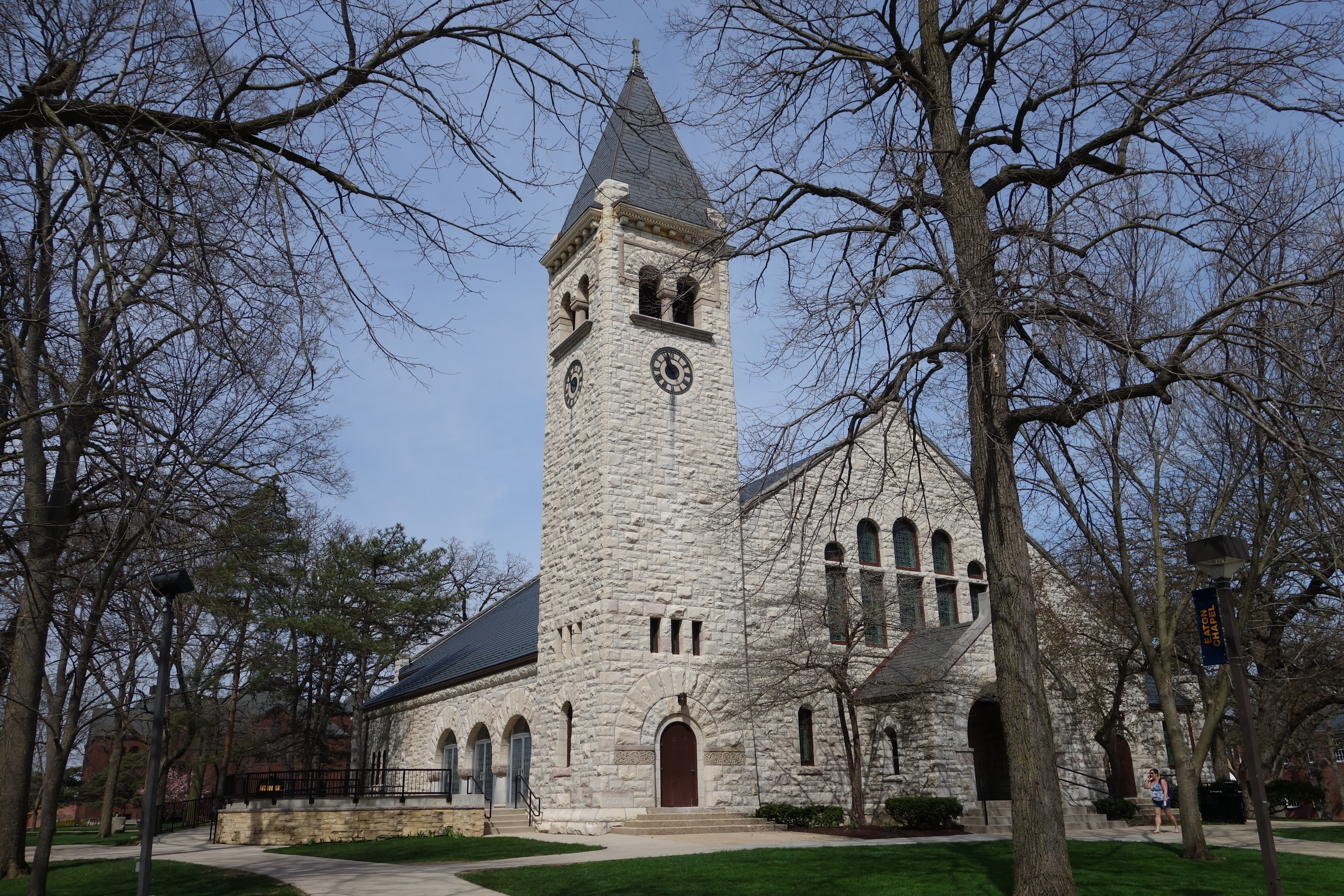
Eaton Chapel

Beloit College has a frisbee golf course contained almost entirely within the college grounds. In April 2006, Beloit students broke the world record for the longest game of Ultimate Frisbee, playing for over 72 hours.

In 2011 Beloit College received the Senator Paul Simon Award for Comprehensive Campus Internationalization. 48 states are represented at the college and approximately 14% of the student body is from countries outside the United States. In addition, about half of all Beloit College students study abroad in places such as China, Russia, Brazil, Germany, India, and Spain. Each year, students can share their experiences abroad on "Beloit and Beyond" Day, when all classes are canceled so that everyone can attend the presentations.

The "Mindset List", an annual list of the life experiences of entering college freshmen, originated at Beloit College in 1998. In 2019, the list moved to Marist College.

In 1969, like many campuses across the country, Beloit College received a set of demands from Black students called "The Black Demands". Various students protested by overtaking Middle College, turning it into a Black Cultural Center, and gathering in front of the Richardson Auditorium before a scheduled board of trustees meeting. The demands were met but the college has not successfully implemented all of them, such as increasing the percentage of both black faculty and students to 10%. In 2018 Beloit College edited its bias policy to add a section on hate acts in order to address hate acts that occurred in 2006, 2015 and 2017.

== Athletics ==
Beloit athletics monogram

Beloit teams are nicknamed the Buccaneers. The university competes at the NCAA Division III level as a member of the Midwest Conference and fields varsity teams in football, baseball, softball, volleyball, men's and women's swimming and diving, men's and women's basketball, men's and women's cross country, men's and women's track and field, men's and women's lacrosse, men's and women's hockey, men's and women's soccer, and esports. Notable successes include baseball coach Dave DeGeorge recording his 558th career win. DeGeorge's teams have won three conference titles in twelve Midwest Conference Tournament appearances. Student-athletes earned All-American honors (Nate Otis track & field) and Scholar All-American Honors (Helena Harrison diving).

== Recognition ==
In 2025, The Princeton Review listed Beloit College among the 391 Best Colleges. Likewise, U.S. News & World Report gave Beloit top rankings for 2025 Best Colleges rankings, Most Innovative, Best Value, First-Year Experience, and Undergraduate Teaching. Washington Monthly ranked Beloit College number 23 in the nation in 2023.

== Notable alumni ==
- Matthew Aid, military historian and author
- Roy Chapman Andrews, naturalist, explorer, and director of the American Museum of Natural History
- James Arness, actor, star of films and long-running TV series Gunsmoke
- Don Bolles, investigative journalist
- Derek Carrier, former NFL tight end
- Thomas Chrowder Chamberlin, geologist, professor, University of Wisconsin president, museum director
- Jay Norwood "Ding" Darling, editorial cartoonist and conservationist who won two Pulitzer Prizes
- Joe Davis, sportscaster
- Cara DeVito, video producer, awarded a Nieman Fellowship by Harvard University
- Clarence Ellis, first African-American Ph.D recipient in computer science and pioneer in interface design
- Janine P. Geske, justice of the Wisconsin Supreme Court
- Red Grammer, Grammy award-winning composer/performer of music for children
- Zainab al-Khawaja, human rights activist
- Stephanie Klett, broadcast personality
- Courtney Lyder, nursing educator
- Kerwin Mathews, actor
- Judith A. Miller, attorney and government official, member of the Beloit board of trustees
- Lorine Niedecker, poet
- Stanley R. Riggs, coastal geologist
- Madeleine Roux, horror writer
- John Sall, one of the four founders of SAS Institute
- Walter A. Strong, publisher of Chicago Daily News
- Matt Tolmach, filmmaker, Sony Pictures Entertainment executive
- James Zwerg, civil rights activist

== Notable faculty ==
- Bei Dao, poet
- Jackson J. Bushnell, educator
- Thomas Chrowder Chamberlin, founder of the Journal of Geology
- Arthur M. Chickering, arachnologist
- Merle Curti, historian, Pulitzer Prize recipient
- Robert O. Fink, papyrologist
- Crawford Gates, musician
- George Ellery Hale, astronomer
- Edward Hoagland, author
- Ursula K. Le Guin, author
- Henry Bradford Nason, chemist
- Lou B. ("Bink") Noll, poet
- John Ostrom, paleontologist
- Ranjan Roy, mathematician
- Scott Sanders, author
- Erastus G. Smith, chemist and politician
- Robley Wilson, poet

== See also ==
- Thompson Observatory
