= Hendricks Holding Company =

American conglomerate

Hendricks Holding
- Company type: Private
- Industry: Conglomerate
- Founded: 2001
- Founder: Ken Hendricks, Diane Hendricks
- Headquarters: Beloit, Wisconsin, U.S.
- Area served: United States
- Key people: Diane Hendricks, Chairman & Owner; Brent Fox, CEO
- Products: various
- Website: www.hendricksholding.com

Hendricks Holding, Inc. (HHC) is a privately held conglomerate based in Beloit, Wisconsin, United States.

== History and management ==
The company was founded in 1982 by Ken Hendricks and Diane Hendricks, owners of ABC Supply.

By the time of his death on December 21, 2007, Ken Hendricks was the 107th richest person in America according to Forbes October 2006 issue.

== Operations and holdings ==
The Hendrick Holding now includes numerous enterprises that span the fields of industry, transportation and logistics, insurance, real estate and construction, recycling, restaurants, and the film industry.

Subsidiary	Products
American Aluminum Extrusion Company	Supplier of aluminum parts
American Construction Metals	Manufacturer of metal roofing
American Industrial Steel & Supply	Wholesaler for metal products
American Westbrook Insurance Services	Insurance
Avid Pallet Services, LLC	Manufacturer and distributor of pallets and wood products
Blackhawk Transport & Logistics	Long-haul trucking company
Blonhaven Hunt Club	Hunting club
Corporate Contractors, Inc.	Contracting firm
Federal Heath Sign Company	Provider of Visual Communications technology via electric/digital signage, Petrol canopy & fascia products and printed graphics
Garick	Processor and distributor of natural fertilizers
Gateway Insurance Company	Insurance
GEM Pharmaceuticals	Pharmaceuticals
Hendricks Commercial Properties, LLC	Real estate
Hendricks River Logistics	Transloading services
Henry Technologies GmbH	Manufacturer of plastic and rubber fender products for agricultural vehicles
Henry Technologies Holdings	Manufacturer and seller of products for the refrigeration and air conditioning industry
Humane Manufacturing	Manufacturer of recycled rubber mats and flooring
Marsh Global Holdings	Consulting
Merrill & Houston, a Steak Joint	Steakhouse
Mpower Pictures	Film Production Company
Mule-Hide Products	Manufacturer of low-slope roofing
NorthStar Medical Technologies	Health Technology
Rivers Edge Foundry	Foundry
Stainless Tank & Equipment	Manufacturer of stainless steel ASME tanks
Universal Recycling Technologies	Recycling
