= ADTC =

ADTC may refer to:

- Adult Diagnostic and Treatment Center, Avenal, New Jersey
- Adult Drug Treatment Court
- Area Drug and Therapeutics Committee, a division of Healthcare Improvement Scotland, UK government agency
- Armament Development and Test Center, Eglin Air Force Base, Florida
