= Special Treatment Unit =

Prison facility in New Jersey, United States

Coordinates: 40.5908°N 74.2688°W

The Special Treatment Unit is a facility in which civilly committed sex offenders are held, pursuant to the New Jersey Sexually Violent Predator Act of 1998 (N.J.S.A. 30:4-27.24 to -27.38). It is operated by the New Jersey Department of Corrections, and is located in a separate building within East Jersey State Prison in Avenel, New Jersey. It is near the Adult Diagnostic and Treatment Center, New Jersey's center for incarcerated sex offenders, also in Avenel. Residents of the three facilities interact only with the residents in their own facility. In 2016, its population was 428. Since the program's inception in 1999 (at a different location), about 15% of the 579 sex offenders who were civilly committed in New Jersey have been discharged to the community after treatment. The state estimated in 2016 that there were 15 patients at Avenel who were convicted as juveniles but were sent to Avenel, indefinitely, once they completed their sentences. Public defenders and attorneys for the residents put the number at 30.

In 2016, Gary Lanigan, the Commissioner of the New Jersey Department of Corrections, and a host of others were hit with a class action suit filed by detainees. They claim their civil rights are violated because they are not provided "adequate and meaningful mental health treatment" (necessary for their possible release) due to "systematic deficiencies." The complaint also says that in addition to the reportedly inadequate treatment, plaintiffs have "been confined in punitive conditions" that overstep the goal of the Sexually Violent Predator Act. Plaintiffs seek redress for the defendants’ alleged preference to "warehouse" such offenders out of sight in an attempt to indefinitely detain and punish, rather than treat supposed mental disabilities. "Individual counseling" at the facility is described as "uncommon".
