= MacFarlane Pheasants Inc. =

Coordinates: 42°38′21″N 89°01′50″W

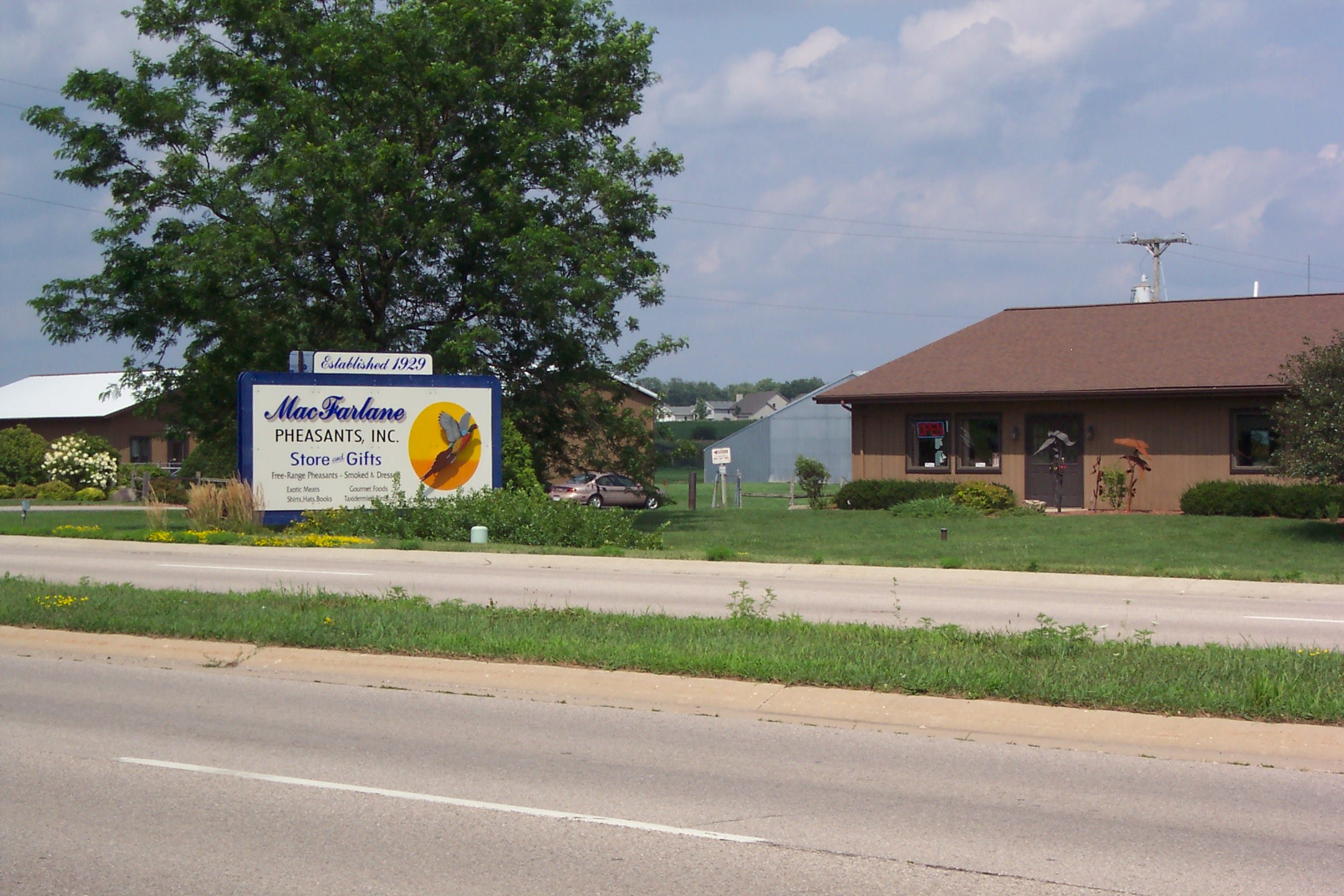
- MacFarlane Pheasants Inc. office

MacFarlane Pheasants Inc., America's largest pheasant farm, hatches more than 1.5 million chicks and sells more than 400,000 mature game birds to game preserves across North America. In both 2007 and 2010 MacFarlane Pheasants was named to the Inc. Magazine top 5000 companies list. The farm lis located in the Town of Rock, just outside the southern city limits of Janesville, Wisconsin, USA. Rock County's Prairie Knoll Park lies just across Center Avenue (U.S. Route 51), to the west.

== History ==
MacFarlane Pheasants was started by Kenneth MacFarlane who went to New York to attend a Game Rearing school. After completing the course, Kenneth returned to Wisconsin. In 1928, Kenneth imported eggs from Gaybird Game Farm in England. The pheasants were bred for sale to hunt clubs.

Kenneth's brother, Donald MacFarlane returned to Wisconsin in 1935 (Donald had been working as a chemical engineer for Standard Oil in New Jersey). Donald then joined Kenneth in managing the pheasant farm. In 1941 Kenneth was killed in a hunting accident on the Mississippi River. Donald continued to operate the pheasant farm after Kenneth's death. In 1946 Donald contracted polio, yet continued to operate the pheasant farm.

The pheasant farm in the 1930s was on the outskirts of Janesville, but as the City of Janesville grew, it found itself within the city limits by the 1950s. In 1953 the farm was moved to its present location (about 1 1/2 miles south of its original location). Also during this time Donald's brother-in-law, James Adamson joined the farm and coordinated the day-to-day farm operations.

During the 1960s with the increased ability to ship day-old poultry nationwide, Donald expanded the breeding aspect of MacFarlane Pheasant Farm and began large-scale production of day-old pheasant chicks. Over 200,000 day-old pheasant chicks were produced annually during the 1960s. During this same time frame dressed bird production was limited (perhaps 3,000 birds a year were produced). Also during the 1960s mature pheasants continued to be produced for sale to hunting preserves. About 200 acres of corn and soybeans were raised yearly. During the 1970s Donald's health declined and the farm sales began to decline somewhat. There was talk of the farm being sold in 1979. Donald persuaded his son Bill MacFarlane to return to Janesville and form MacFarlane Pheasants, Inc.

In the course of the early 1980s Donald's health declined further and James Adamson retired. In 1985, with the passing of Donald, Bill MacFarlane was now in charge of the operation.

In order to allow for expanded hatching capacity, a new hatchery was built in 1987. During this time of growth, pheasant pens were constructed yearly, and new brooder barns were erected. In 1988 another farm, one mile away, was purchased to be the hub of our breeding operation with new pens then erected at that location.
