= Diane Hendricks =

American roofing billionaire and political figure

- Born: Diane Marie Smith; March 2, 1947 (age 79); Mondovi, Wisconsin, U.S.
- Occupations: Co-founder and Chair of ABC Supply
- Political party: Republican
- Spouse: Ken Hendricks (m. 1975; died 2007)
- Children: 7
- Relatives: Kevin Hendricks (step son) Kim Hendricks (step daughter) Kendra Hendricks (step daughter) Kathy Hendricks (step daughter)

Diane Marie Hendricks (née Smith; born March 2, 1947) is an American billionaire, businesswoman, and conservative political donor. She is the widow of the late businessman Ken Hendricks. She is the largest political donor in the state of Wisconsin.

== Biography ==
Hendricks was born in Mondovi, Wisconsin, and raised in Osseo, Wisconsin, the daughter of dairy farmers. At seventeen, she had her first child and began assembling pens at the Parker Pen Company in Janesville, WI. Her relationship with the child's father was short lived, ending in divorce. She graduated from Osseo-Fairchild High School in 1965. She speaks of working as a Playboy Bunny. At the age of 21 she became interested in real estate and earned her broker's license.

Sometime after this, she met roofing contractor Ken Hendricks, whom she married in 1975. Together, they began buying old houses, fixing them up, and renting them out around Beloit, Wisconsin. They soon moved on to doing the same with industrial properties.

Hendricks has seven children and lives in Afton, Wisconsin. Ken Hendricks died at age 66 on December 21, 2007, in Afton, Wisconsin, when he fell through a portion of roof that was under construction at his home.

== Career ==
In 1975, she sold custom-built homes. Her husband Ken was a roofer's son and high school dropout. They married and became business partners. In 1982, they secured a loan to establish ABC Supply. This firm would become the United States' largest wholesale distributor of roofing, windows, gutters, and siding for residential and commercial buildings.

Hendricks owns a holding company and is the owner and chairperson of ABC Supply. In 2018, Forbes ranked her the US's richest self-made woman. As of December 2024, Forbes estimated her net worth at US$21.9 billion (up from US$2.8 billion in March 2012).

In September 2022, Hendricks resigned from the board of Beloit College.

A television show on the A&E Network entitled "Betting on Beloit", featuring Hendricks and her daughter Konya Hendricks Schuh, premiered in July 2025. The program showcases her work in Beloit, Wisconsin.

== Political activity ==
Hendricks was an enthusiastic supporter of her home state governor Scott Walker. She donated $500,000 to Walker's 2012 campaign to avoid recall, and was his biggest donor that year. In January 2011, she was recorded asking Walker what she could do to aid him in turning Wisconsin into a Right to Work state.

=== Donald Trump ===
Hendricks served as an economic advisor to Trump's 2016 presidential campaign. Across the 2016 and 2020 election cycles combined, she donated $1.4 million to the Trump Victory committee; in 2020 she also gave $4 million to America First Action, the principal pro-Trump super PAC that cycle. Hendricks contributed a total of $1.1 million to Trump's 2020 presidential campaign. As of 2023, she had contributed $5 million to the super PAC Make America Great Again, Inc. She spoke on the last night of the 2024 Republican National Convention, where she was listed as an "everyday American" by convention materials. A 2026 Wall Street Journal report identified Hendricks as the third-highest known donor (and highest non-corporation donor) to MAGA, Inc., at $27 million since the 2024 election.

=== Other Republican candidates and committees ===
She also supported Paul Ryan. In 2014, she donated $1 million to the Freedom Partners Action Fund, a pro-Republican Super PAC created by the Koch Brothers. In both 2015 and 2016, she donated $2 million to Freedom Partners Action Fund. In the 2016 U.S. presidential election, she gave over $5 million to the Reform America Fund, a super PAC which opposed Democratic candidate Hillary Clinton and supported Republican U.S. Senator from Wisconsin Ron Johnson. In 2015, she gave $5 million to a PAC associated with presidential candidate Scott Walker, of which $4 million was ultimately refunded. Prior to Scott Pruitt's resignation as head of the EPA in July 2018, she donated $50,000 to the Scott Pruitt Legal Expenses Trust. Hendricks contributed $2,800 to the 2020 primary campaign of Georgia representative Marjorie Taylor Greene.

As of August 2026, Hendricks spent $25.8 million in support of Republican candidates in the 2026 United States elections.

== Tax controversies ==
An investigation by Urban Milwaukee found that Hendricks's multi-story 8,500-square-foot home in the Town of Rock in Rock County, Wisconsin, had been assessed as a 1,663-square-foot ranch. Following the Urban Milwaukee investigation, Hendricks denied the tax assessor access to the property, citing "security reasons". After she agreed to supply the assessor with data on the home, the property's assessment was changed from $445,700 to $1,205,500.
