= Living Proof (Lifers Group album) =

Studio album by Lifers Group
- Released: 1993
- Genre: Rap
- Label: Hollywood BASIC
- Producers: Solid Productions, Organized Konfusion

Lifers Group chronology
Lifers Group (1991)	Living Proof (1993)

Living Proof is an album by the incarcerated rap collective Lifers Group, released in 1993. The collective was made up of inmates serving sentences of 25 years to double-life. The album followed the collective's 1991 debut EP and their Grammy-nominated long-form video. Royalties from the album were put toward the Lifers Group Juvenile Awareness Program.

== Production ==
The album was recorded inside East Jersey State Prison, in Rahway, New Jersey. A temporary studio was built in the prison, and the collective had a week to record. Living Proof was produced by Solid Productions, with, on some tracks, Organized Konfusion. The members of the collective were credited by their nicknames and their prison serial numbers. They wrote all of the lyrics and assisted with some of the musical backing. A video was filmed at the prison for the first single, "Short Life of a Gangsta".

== Critical reception ==
Professional ratings
Review scores
Source	Rating
AllMusic	3/5 stars
Chicago Sun-Times	3/4 stars
Robert Christgau	(3-star Honorable Mention)
MusicHound R&B: The Essential Album Guide	1/5 stars
RapReviews	7.5/10

Trouser Press wrote that the album "trades intensity for a showcase of Rahway’s considerable lyrical/musical talents ... The problem is not in the message or the sound—as on-point as ever—but in the very anonymity of the performers." The Gazette thought that "Ice-T may have scarier beats, but he can't top this for tragedy or credibility."

The Chicago Sun-Times stated that "in addition to solid musical production and skillful lyrical flow, the Rahway crew rips a few choice rhymes on 'Jack U Back', a dis of gangsta rappers who glorify street life and mislead listeners about its perils." The Miami Herald declared that the album "is a raw and numbing litany of recrimination, stupid choices and ruined lives, made all the more depressing because you know every word is true."

MusicHound R&B: The Essential Album Guide deemed Living Proof "more refined than the first album, but ... still nothing incredibly compelling."

== Track listing ==
No.	Title	Length
1.	"One Life to Live"
2.	"Let Me Out (Edit)"
3.	"Rise or Fall"
4.	"Prison Break 1"
5.	"Cuff' Em Up"
6.	"Emotional Violence"
7.	"Freestyle 1"
8.	"Out of Sight, Out of Mind"
9.	"Living Proof"
10.	"Short Life of a Gangsta"
11.	"Prison Break 2"
12.	"Prison is the Death of a Poor Man"
13.	"Back in the Days"
14.	"Jack U Back (So U Wanna Be a Gangsta)"
15.	"Short Life of a Gangsta (Organized Konfusion Mix)"
