= Special treatment =

Special treatment means distinguishment from the majority, and may refer to:

- VIP treatment, giving some privileges as a very important person
- Sonderbehandlung (S.B.), a Nazi euphemism for mass murder
- Special Treatment Unit, a prison unit in New Jersey for civilly committed sex offenders
- Special treatment steel (STS; a.k.a. protective deck plate), a type of warship armor developed by Carnegie Steel around 1910

== Arts and media ==
- Special Treatment (film) (Serbian: Посебан третман, romanized: Poseban tretman), a 1980 Yugoslavian drama film directed by Goran Paskaljević
- "Special Treatment", a protest song by Paul Kelly about the oppression of Australian Aborigines, the B-side to "Careless" by Paul Kelly and the Messengers
- "Special Treatments", S3 E2 of the American black comedy drama anthology TV series The White Lotus
- Here's to Special Treatment by Conor Oberst

== See also ==
- Entitlement (psychology), when someone expects special treatment
- Inorodtsy (Russian: иноро́дцы), the ethnicity-based category of people that received special treatment under the law of the Russian Empire
- Sweetheart deal, a contractual agreement that gives some parties special treatment
- Treatment (disambiguation)
