= Treatment =

Treatment may refer to:

- "Treatment" (song), a 2012 song by Labrinth featuring Etta Bond
- Film treatment, a prose telling of a story intended to be turned into a screenplay
- Therapy, or medical treatment

== See also ==
- Special treatment (disambiguation)
- The Treatment (disambiguation)
- Treating, serving food etc to influence people for political gain
- In Treatment, an American drama TV series
- In Treatment (Italian TV series)
- "In Treatment" (Law & Order: Criminal Intent)
- Cruel, inhuman or degrading treatment
- Cryogenic treatment
- Heat treating
- Multivalued treatment, in statistics
- National treatment, an economic concept
- Water treatment
  - Sewage treatment
  - Secondary treatment, the removal of biodegradable organic matter from sewage
  - Wastewater treatment
- Silent treatment, a form of social rejection
- Surface finishing, a range of industrial processes
- Thermal treatment, waste treatment technology
- Treatment and control groups, in the design of experiments
- Waste treatment
- Window treatment, decorative window covering
- Equality of treatment
