= Lifers Group =

American hip hop group

- Origin: Rahway, New Jersey, United States
- Genre: hip hop
- Years active: 1991–1993
- Label: Hollywood Basic

Lifers Group was a hip hop group formed by Maxwell Melvins while incarcerated at East Jersey State Prison in Rahway, New Jersey, in 1991.

== Background ==
The Lifers Group's music project grew out of the "Lifers Group", an organization founded in 1972 by incarcerated men at Rahway State Prison sentenced to twenty-five years to life. In 1976 the Lifers Group created their Juvenile Awareness Program. Young people would be brought into the prison and put in a meeting room with life-sentenced residents. The residents would tell the horror stories of what life was like in prison, so that the youth would not become misled to thinking that incarceration was a glamorous symbol of urban social status. “Learn the truth at the expense of our sorrow” was one of their mottos, along with the admonition to “help keep our membership low.” Their curriculum was referred to as "scared straight," which became a famous term in the documentary of their work, Scared Straight!

== Music Project ==
Maxwell Melvins, who was transferred to the prison in 1987 and soon became a member of the Lifers Group, noticed that the at-risk youth in the Juvenile Awareness Program, while waiting in line for their transportation, would be free-styling or singing popular rap songs. He as well as others came up with the idea for the Lifers Group to create a rap album, to help convey their message to the youth. The lead administrators of the Lifers Group had become incarcerated many years before the genre of rap music was created, so they were unsure of Melvins' proposal, but they eventually approved his idea of using music as a means of outreach and fundraising for the program.

The group's music industry career began when Melvins contacted producer David Funken Klein, the newly appointed head of Disney Music Group's rap subsidiary Hollywood Basic. Lifers Group's Lifers Group EP became Hollywood Basic's inaugural release in 1991, accompanied by a short documentary, Lifers Group World Tour: Rahway Prison, That's It.

Rahway State Prison's Corrections Officer Lieutenant Alan August performed with the Lifers Group in their music videos and served as their logistics coordinator, helping them take care of things outside of the prison that they could not be allowed to do. In 1991 Richard Wormser, who wrote many books about the troubles of poverty, race, and discrimination, published Lifers: Learn the Truth at the Expense of Our Sorrow.

In 1993 Melvins was transferred to a different prison. The corrections department did not inform Melvins or the public why the transfer occurred, other than saying "there's no ulterior motive for moving Maxwell". Salaam Ismial, president of the non-profit National United Youth Council, felt the transfer was inappropriate and planned to write a letter to the corrections department asking them "to make a decision of bringing this young man back to where he was doing good work." For Melvins, the transfer created barriers of communication that impeded him from continuing his music project.

== Awards and recognition ==
In 1991 the Southern Christian Leadership Conference awarded to Melvins, on behalf of the Lifers Group, their annual Dr. Martin Luther King Jr. Humanitarian Award for "helping keep youth out of prison and extraordinary work for the good of humanity."

In 1992 the Lifers Group were nominated for a Grammy, in the category of Best Long Form Music Video, for their piece Lifers Group World Tour: Rahway Prison, That's It! directed by Penelope Spheeris and released by Hollywood Basic on videocassette. The other nominees they competed against were Billy Joel, Peter Gabriel, Madonna, and Sinead O'Connor. The prison administration would not allow Melvins to go to Radio City Music Hall to attend the ceremony. To capture the uniqueness of the Lifers Group's nomination the 20/20 news show came into Rahway Prison on the day of the ceremony and interviewed Melvins while he and members of the Lifers Group watched the event on television.

In 2006 items from the personal archives of Maxwell Melvins was accessioned by the Smithsonian National Museum of American History, as part of their “Hip-Hop Won’t Stop: The Beat, The Rhymes, The Life” collecting initiative.

The work and influence of the Lifers Group and their music project has been discussed and published in governmental reports by the State of New Jersey and the House of Congress.

== Maxwell Melvins ==
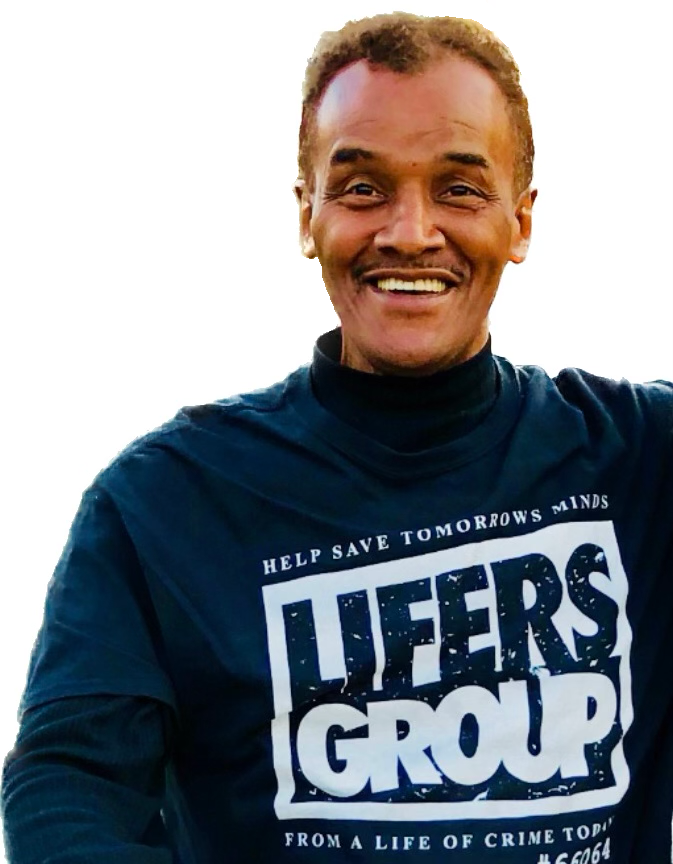
Maxwell Melvins wearing Lifers Group t-shirt, which says "Help Saves Tomorrow's Minds From A Life Of Crime Today."

Maxwell Melvins was released from prison in 2012 and has continued his effort to teach people about the risks of a life of drugs, crime, domestic violence, and incarceration.

In 2017 he was interviewed by Dr. Nicole Fleetwood at the Metropolitan Museum of Art, and later that year became senior advisor to the Die Jim Crow project.

In 2018 he gave a lecture, "Using the Story of My Crime As a Platform for Restorative Justice," at TEDx CUNY.

In 2019 Melvins spoke at the Harvard Graduate School of Education's Hip Hop Education Conference.

In his hometown of Camden, New Jersey, Melvins serves as a Reentry Peer Specialist as part of the Camden County Department of Corrections Reentry Community Engagement Committee.

== Discography ==
=== Albums ===
- 1993: Living Proof

=== Singles & EPs ===
- 1991: Lifers Group (also known as #66064)
- 1991: Belly Of The Beast / The Real Deal
- 1991: Real Deal / Lesson 4
- 1991: The Real Deal
- 1993: Jack U. Back (So You Wanna Be A Gangsta) / Living Proof (Remix)
- 1993: Short Life Of A Gangsta

== See also ==
- The Escorts – R&B vocal group formed at East Jersey State Prison (then Rahway State Prison) in 1970
