= Eric LeGrand =

American college football player (born 1990)

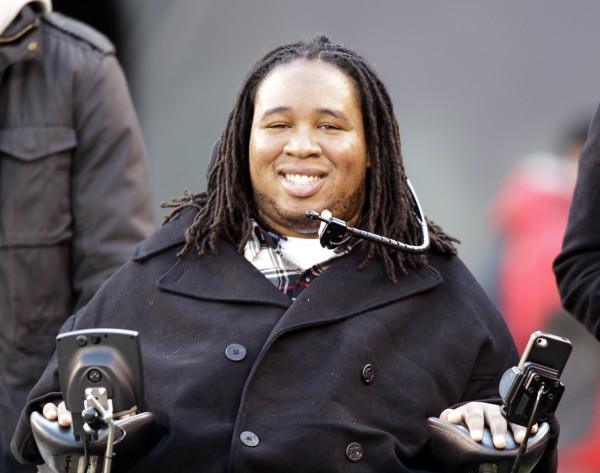
- LeGrand in 2016

No. 52
- Position: Defensive tackle

Personal information
- Born: September 4, 1990 (age 36); Avenel, New Jersey, U.S.
- Listed height: 6 ft 2 in (1.88 m)
- Listed weight: 275 lb (125 kg)

Career information
- High school: Colonia (Woodbridge Township, New Jersey)
- College: Rutgers (2008–2012)

Awards and highlights
- Rutgers Scarlet Knights No. 52 retired; Rutgers Athletics Hall of Fame

Eric James LeGrand (born September 4, 1990) is an American former football defensive tackle who played college football for the Rutgers Scarlet Knights.

He became paralyzed while making a tackle in an October 2010 game, but has since regained movement in his shoulders and sensation throughout his body. As of 2020, LeGrand has been making consistent recovery at the Kessler Institute for Rehabilitation.

The Tampa Bay Buccaneers signed him to a symbolic contract as an undrafted free agent in May 2012.

In 2017, LeGrand was inducted into the WWE Hall of Fame as the third recipient of the Warrior Award.

== College ==
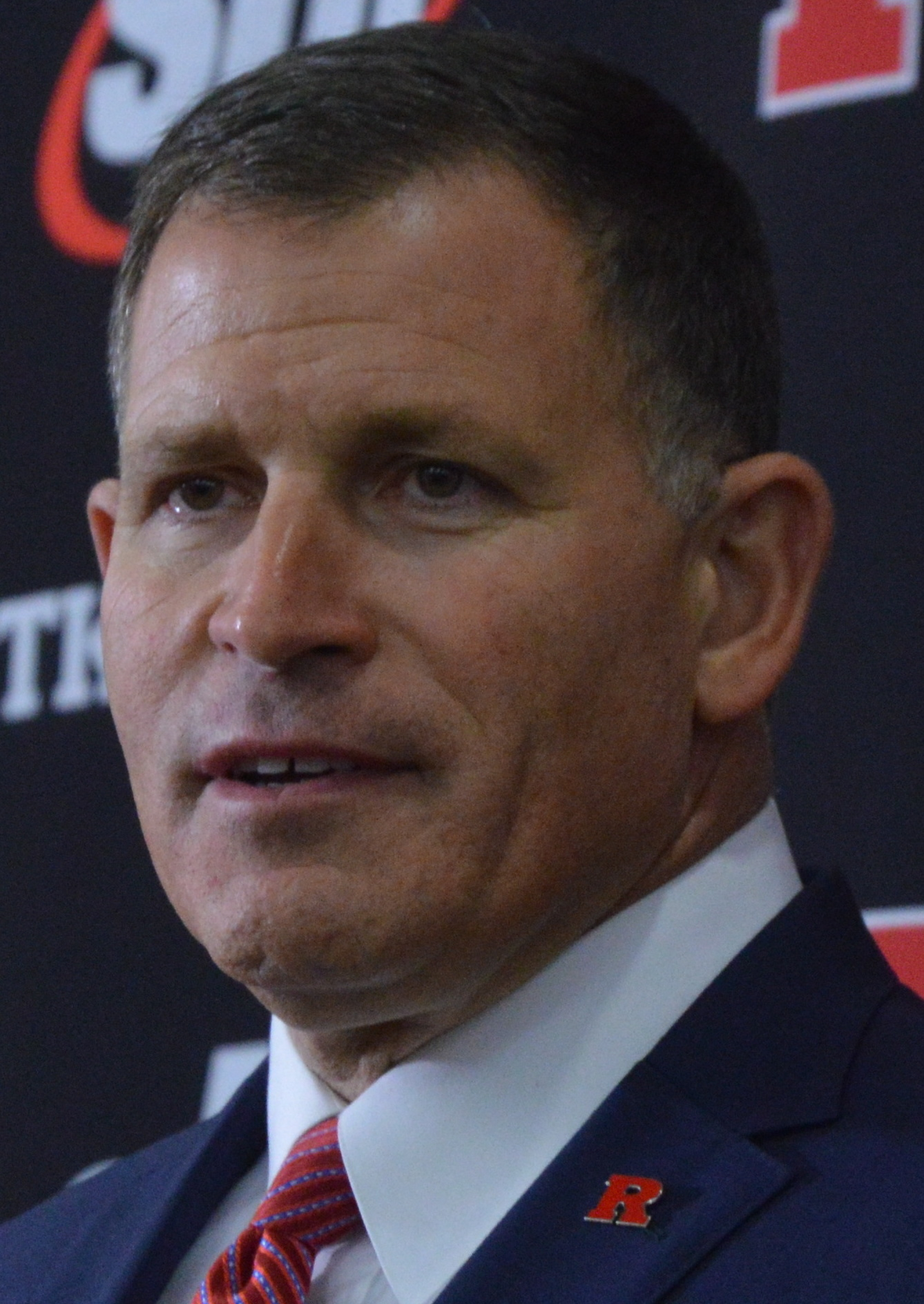
Rutgers coach Greg Schiano saw LeGrand's potential, moving him from his old position to defensive lineman

In 2008, as a true freshman, LeGrand made his collegiate debut against the North Carolina Tar Heels on September 11. He saw action on special teams. By 2009, coach Greg Schiano decided to channel LeGrand's strength and speed at a new position, defensive lineman. LeGrand earned himself the backup defensive tackle position to Charlie Noonan, but he managed to appear in all thirteen games that season, racking up 33 tackles. Schiano saw him as a multipurpose player, and LeGrand proved himself to be with 13 tackles on kickoff coverage in his sophomore season. LeGrand recorded a tackle for loss in seven games, and played eleven games where he had multiple sacks. He went on to tie his career-high four tackles against the Maryland Terrapins. LeGrand added three solo tackles, including a tackle-for-loss against West Virginia on December 5 and at Syracuse on November 21. LeGrand posted three tackles versus South Florida on November 12 and matched his career high four tackles and had 1 1/2 tackles for loss along with a fumble recovery against Pittsburgh on October 16 and three tackles and an assisted tackle for loss against Howard on September 12.

In 2010, LeGrand's junior season, he proved to be a crucial performer at defensive tackle in the first six games before suffering a career-ending spinal cord injury. He had his season-high three tackles and a tackle for loss against Tulane on October 2. On September 2 versus Norfolk State, LeGrand proved useful to the team defense, posting a pair of tackles, including a tackle for loss and a fumble recovery. He added two tackles at FIU on September 11, and assisted on a sack against North Carolina on September 25. On October 16 in a game against the Army Black Knights at MetLife Stadium, he suffered an injury in the fourth quarter during a collision with Army's kickoff returner, Malcom Brown, ending the defensive tackle's season with 13 tackles including two sacks.

== Injury ==
On October 16, 2010, LeGrand suffered a severe spinal cord injury during a game against Army in East Rutherford, New Jersey, at MetLife Stadium. On a kickoff to Army, LeGrand unintentionally put his head down while running and ended up driving the crown of his head into the shoulder of the ball carrier, Malcolm Brown. LeGrand was credited with the tackle, but he lay on the ground for several minutes before being carted off, unable to move anything but his head and unable to breathe.

As the gurney rolled off the field at MetLife Stadium, LeGrand tried to force a thumbs up to the crowd but was unable to perform the gesture, saying "it felt like a thousand pound cinder block was holding me down".

He was taken to the intensive care unit of the Hackensack University Medical Center, in Hackensack, New Jersey, where doctors determined that LeGrand was paralyzed from the neck down. He fractured his C3 and C4 cervical vertebrae. About two weeks later, he was transferred to Kessler Institute for Rehabilitation, one of the US's leaders in spinal cord rehabilitation.

LeGrand was put on a respirator right away to help him breathe, and doctors informed his mother that he would more than likely need the aid of the machine to continue breathing for the rest of his life. Doctors also informed Karen LeGrand that her son had a suspected 0–5% chance of walking for the rest of his life. The next day when LeGrand woke up, he managed to mouth the words "I'll be back" to his mother.

=== Recovery ===
LeGrand wanted to breathe at his own pace and asked doctors to take him off of his ventilator on Thanksgiving 2010. He stated, "It's not even whether you keep breathing. It's whether you keep breathing how you want to breathe." A month later, LeGrand lasted an hour and a half off of his ventilator. LeGrand proceeded to practice breathing without the use of medical equipment and was independently breathing by January 2011. Coach Greg Schiano would visit LeGrand frequently and is said to have truly embraced the entire family as his own. Schiano would repeatedly relieve Eric's mother from taking care of him without hesitation.

On January 6, Rutgers announced that LeGrand had regained movement in his shoulders and sensation throughout his body.

On October 29, LeGrand returned with his teammates for a Rutgers home game against West Virginia during a snow storm. His return to High Point Solutions Stadium was said to be the most indelible moment of the year and was awarded the Sports Illustrated's Fans’ Choice Best Moment of 2011.

By Summer 2011, LeGrand took his story more public by posting pictures of himself on his Twitter account, standing straight up with the help of a specialized metal frame and announcing that he was slowly regaining movement and sensation in his arms. Overnight, LeGrand gained 12,000 new followers.

In 2012, thinking his story was fairly well-known, LeGrand jokingly sent a Tweet to Lolo Jones challenging her to a race. All she knew of him was that he was a former football player and responded that, as a track star, she would win convincingly. When she was made aware of her unintended insult, she issued an apology for her response which was accepted by LeGrand. On May 14, 2014, she and LeGrand participated in a race called the Wings for Life World Run, held around the world, with proceeds going toward funding spinal cord injury research.

A fund named "bELieve" was set up by the Rutgers Scarlet Knight family with proceeds going to LeGrand and his family. The "bELieve" foundation has raised proceeds through selling sporting apparel stitched with LeGrand's name and number (52) as well as hosting numerous sporting events in his honor.

== Professional career ==
LeGrand resumed his studies via Skype for the Spring 2011 semester and made multiple appearances at spring football practices. At the Scarlet-White spring game, he expressed his aspiration to become a sports broadcaster, and he has continued to become an inspirational speaker nationwide. LeGrand later became a sports commentator and has worked for 13 seasons on Scarlet Knights football broadcasts with the RWJBarnabas Health Rutgers Sports Network.

The Tampa Bay Buccaneers symbolically signed LeGrand on May 2, 2012. The Buccaneers were coached by Greg Schiano, who was the Rutgers head coach during LeGrand's playing career. Schiano agreed to become the head coach of the Tampa Bay Buccaneers on January 26, 2012. LeGrand officially announced his retirement from football on July 26, 2012, to free up a roster spot for the team.

At the beginning of the 2012 NFL season, the rules regarding kickoffs changed so that kickoffs took place from the 35-yard line, instead of the 30-yard line, in hopes of reducing the number of injuries. LeGrand believed that the rule should return to its previous incarnation, and he argued that many football players can make a career out of playing on special teams and that the new rule deprives teams and players of some of the thrill and excitement of the game.

Subway added LeGrand to their roster of star athlete promoters. LeGrand appeared alongside Justin Tuck of the New York Giants in commercials throughout the 2012 season. LeGrand joined a team of Subway-sponsored athletes including Olympic gold medalists Michael Phelps and Apolo Anton Ohno. Tom Pace of Subway's marketing office stated that; "We believe his inspirational story resonates with our fans. All of our athletes who know Eric are already rooting for him. Like us, they love his character, determination and positive outlook."

From 2016 to 2017, LeGrand hosted a six-episode mini web series, Mission Possible with Eric LeGrand, which was produced by the Mission Possible Group. Peter Berg, Doug Ellin, and Teri Weinberg were executive producers on the series, which launched digitally on FoxSports. The series features stories of six individuals living in the face of adversity. The episodes include appearances by: Tom Brady, Bill Belichick, Drew Brees, Sean Payton, Dwayne Johnson, Justin Thomas, Michael Strahan, Frank Lampard, and Triple H. LeGrand made appearances promoting the series on Good Morning America, Fox NFL Sunday, First Things First, The Seth Davis Show, CBS This Morning, and Good Morning Football.

In 2020, Eric started building a coffee shop in his New Jersey hometown, Woodbridge, called LeGrand Coffee House. The business opened in 2022.

In March 2023 Eric Legrand began a Kentucky Straight Bourbon Whiskey company in partnership with Brian Axelrod. It is now sold in Kentucky and New Jersey. To honor Eric's Rutgers jersey number 52, $5.20 of every sale goes to the Christopher and Dana Reeve Foundation.

LeGrand also established Team LeGrand, which has raised more than $2 million for the Christopher & Dana Reeve Foundation. In April 2026, LeGrand was inducted into the Rutgers Hall of Distinguished Alumni.

== Awards and honors ==
In June 2012, LeGrand was presented the Unsung Hero Award by the New Jersey Hall of Fame.

He was presented the Jimmy V Award for Perseverance at the 20th annual ESPYs on July 11, 2012. During his speech, he announced that he would someday walk again.

In August 2012, LeGrand was named the most influential person in New Jersey sports by the Star Ledger.

The Eric LeGrand Patriot Saint Foundation is dedicated to helping those with spinal cord injuries. Nike presented their Eric LeGrand Foundation game jersey for Tampa Bay fans who want to show their support and spirit for LeGrand on his long road to recovery. All of the proceeds of LeGrand's number 52 jerseys, which are on sale in the team shop, go to this foundation. His jersey will remain on sale regardless of LeGrand's team status; for now, LeGrand's role is to provide inspiration for his teammates and others.

The Rutgers Division of Intercollegiate Athletics announced the establishment of the Eric LeGrand Believe Fund to support him and his family. The Believe Fund's goal is to raise money to support the paralyzed player as he undergoes medical treatment for the injury he had against Army. The money will be used as the LeGrand family sees fit.

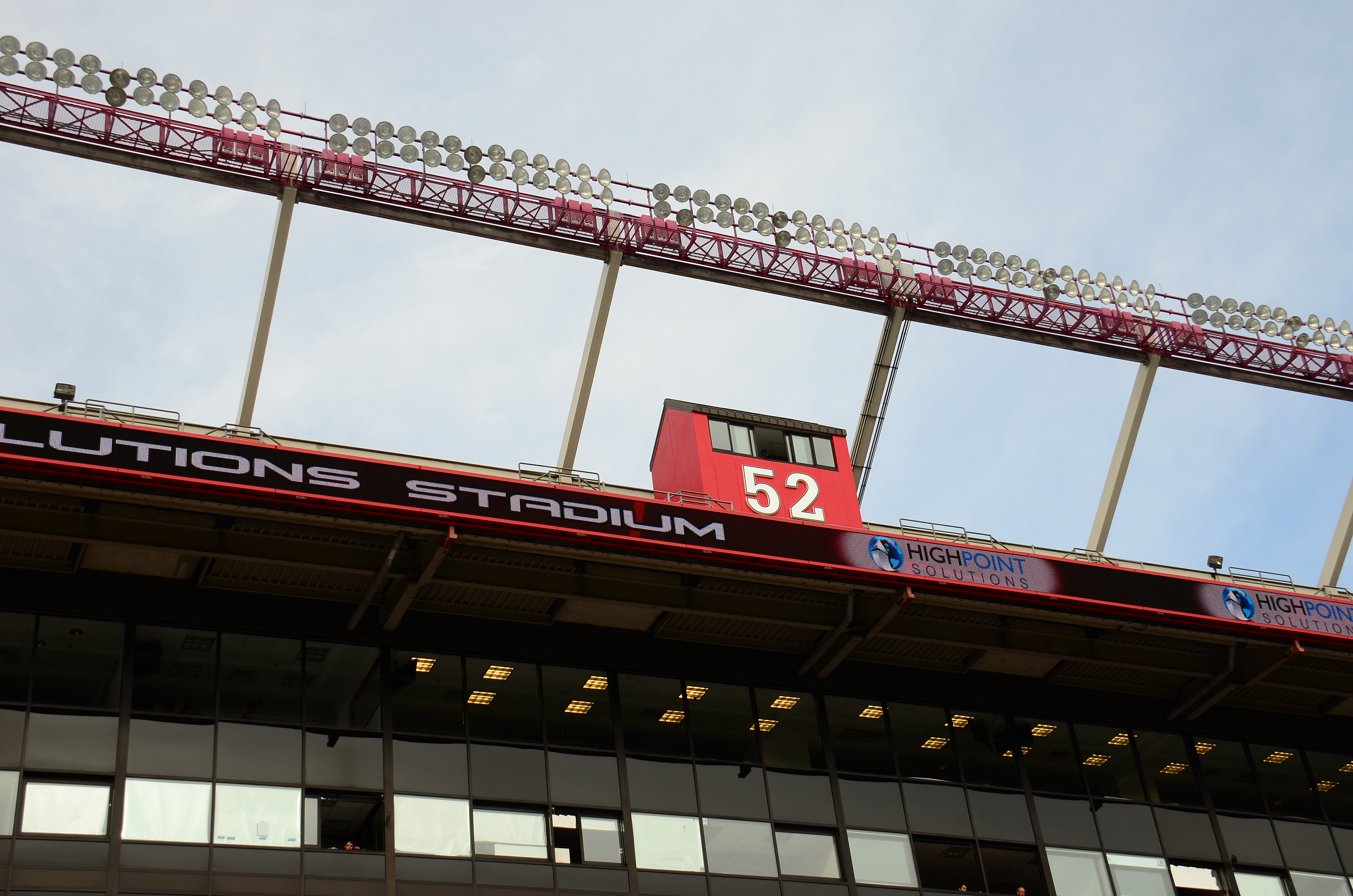
LeGrand's number 52 was retired by Rutgers in 2013

On July 30, 2013, it was announced that Rutgers would retire the No. 52 jersey worn by LeGrand. The ceremony occurred on September 14, 2013, at halftime of the Rutgers-Eastern Michigan game. It was the first number to be retired by Rutgers in the 144-year history of their program. It has been stated by Rutgers and LeGrand that when he is able to walk onto the field again, they will unretire the #52 and put it back into rotation for a worthy player.

On May 18, 2014, LeGrand received a degree in labor relations from Rutgers and was asked to speak to his fellow graduates at Rutgers' spring commencement exercises.

On October 16, 2016 (the sixth anniversary of his spinal cord injury), Avenel, NJ's former Fifth District Park was rededicated in LeGrand's honor as "Eric LeGrand 'Believe' Park". The park is slated to be fully redesigned and updated with handicap-accessible playground equipment.

On March 13, 2017, professional wrestling and media company WWE announced that LeGrand would receive the Warrior Award at the WWE Hall of Fame ceremony on March 31, 2017. Since its introduction in 2015, the Warrior Award is given to "an individual who has exhibited unwavering strength and perseverance, and who lives life with the courage and compassion that embodies the indomitable spirit of Ultimate Warrior".

In 2020, he was inducted into the Rutgers Athletics Hall of Fame.

== Books ==
In both The Victorious Story of Eric LeGrand (Young Readers' Edition) and Believe: My Faith and the Tackle That Changed My Life, he tells the story of how he is rebuilding his life, continuing his education, and pursuing a career in sports broadcasting. The book was published by HarperCollins in September 2012.

== Family ==
LeGrand's mother is Karen LeGrand. He has a sister named Nicole LeGrand Harrigan, and his grandmother is Betty LeGrand.

== See also ==
- 2010 Rutgers Scarlet Knights football team
- Adam Taliaferro
- Kevin Everett
- Devon Walker
