= Afton, Wisconsin =

- Unincorporated community
- Location within Wisconsin Location within the United States
- Coordinates: 42°36′14″N 89°04′16″W
- Country: United States
- State: Wisconsin
- County: Rock
- Elevation: 761 ft (232 m)
- Time zone: UTC-6 (Central (CST))
  - Summer (DST): UTC-5 (CDT)
- ZIP Code: 53501
- Area code: 608
- GNIS feature ID: 1560708

Afton (also Middledale) is an unincorporated community in the Town of Rock, in Rock County, Wisconsin, United States. The town hall for the Town of Rock is in Afton.

== History ==
Originally called Middletown, the community was renamed circa 1857–8 after the poem Sweet Afton by Robert Burns.

== Climate ==
Climate data for Afton, Wisconsin, 1991–2020 normals, extremes 1987–present
Month	Jan	Feb	Mar	Apr	May	Jun	Jul	Aug	Sep	Oct	Nov	Dec	Year
Record high °F (°C)	60 (16)	74 (23)	83 (28)	89 (32)	96 (36)	101 (38)	103 (39)	102 (39)	96 (36)	89 (32)	76 (24)	67 (19)	103 (39)
Mean maximum °F (°C)	48.7 (9.3)	53.0 (11.7)	68.1 (20.1)	79.1 (26.2)	86.9 (30.5)	92.0 (33.3)	93.0 (33.9)	92.1 (33.4)	89.3 (31.8)	81.8 (27.7)	66.1 (18.9)	52.2 (11.2)	95.2 (35.1)
Mean daily maximum °F (°C)	28.3 (−2.1)	32.4 (0.2)	44.6 (7.0)	57.9 (14.4)	69.9 (21.1)	79.9 (26.6)	83.4 (28.6)	81.7 (27.6)	75.1 (23.9)	61.7 (16.5)	46.3 (7.9)	33.5 (0.8)	57.9 (14.4)
Daily mean °F (°C)	19.9 (−6.7)	23.5 (−4.7)	35.0 (1.7)	47.0 (8.3)	58.9 (14.9)	68.9 (20.5)	72.6 (22.6)	70.6 (21.4)	63.0 (17.2)	50.6 (10.3)	37.4 (3.0)	25.8 (−3.4)	47.8 (8.8)
Mean daily minimum °F (°C)	11.6 (−11.3)	14.7 (−9.6)	25.7 (−3.5)	36.1 (2.3)	48.0 (8.9)	58.0 (14.4)	61.7 (16.5)	59.5 (15.3)	51.0 (10.6)	39.5 (4.2)	28.5 (−1.9)	18.1 (−7.7)	37.7 (3.2)
Mean minimum °F (°C)	−10.4 (−23.6)	−6.3 (−21.3)	5.9 (−14.5)	22.9 (−5.1)	34.1 (1.2)	45.0 (7.2)	51.6 (10.9)	49.7 (9.8)	37.5 (3.1)	26.4 (−3.1)	13.3 (−10.4)	−2.6 (−19.2)	−14.7 (−25.9)
Record low °F (°C)	−30 (−34)	−31 (−35)	−12 (−24)	15 (−9)	27 (−3)	36 (2)	45 (7)	43 (6)	28 (−2)	14 (−10)	−4 (−20)	−25 (−32)	−31 (−35)
Average precipitation inches (mm)	1.63 (41)	1.61 (41)	2.06 (52)	3.57 (91)	4.09 (104)	4.99 (127)	4.19 (106)	4.34 (110)	3.73 (95)	2.99 (76)	2.33 (59)	1.90 (48)	37.43 (950)
Average snowfall inches (cm)	10.8 (27)	10.1 (26)	4.1 (10)	1.3 (3.3)	0.0 (0.0)	0.0 (0.0)	0.0 (0.0)	0.0 (0.0)	0.0 (0.0)	0.2 (0.51)	2.4 (6.1)	7.7 (20)	36.6 (92.91)
Average precipitation days (≥ 0.01 in)	10.1	8.7	9.7	12.4	13.2	12.7	10.4	10.2	10.1	10.2	9.3	9.7	126.7
Average snowy days (≥ 0.1 in)	6.6	5.1	2.8	0.7	0.0	0.0	0.0	0.0	0.0	0.1	1.2	5.1	21.6
Source 1: NOAA
Source 2: National Weather Service

== Notable people ==
- Diane Hendricks, businesswoman, lives in Afton
- Ken Hendricks, businessman, lived in Afton
