= The Treatment =

The Treatment may refer to:

- The Treatment (novel)
- The Treatment (2001 film)
- The Treatment (2006 film)
- The Treatment (2014 film)
- The Treatment, political tactic used by Lyndon B. Johnson
- The Treatment (band), a British hard rock band
- The Treatment (Early Day Miners album), 2009
- The Treatment (Mr. Probz album), 2013
- "The Treatment", song by Sepultura from the album A-Lex, 2009

== See also ==
- Treatment (disambiguation)
