= Bradco Supply =

Former distributor of building materials basedin Avenel, New Jersey, US

- Company type: Subsidiary
- Industry: Distribution
- Founded: 1966; 60 years ago
- Founder: Barry Segal
- Headquarters: Avenel, New Jersey, United States
- Number of locations: 130 branches in 30 States
- Area served: United States
- Products: Building products; Roofing
- Revenue: $1.5 billion (2009)

Bradco Supply was a distributor of building materials for the commercial and residential building markets, particularly roofing supplies.

== Company history ==
Bradco Supply was founded in 1966 by Barry Segal, with a single warehouse in Avenel, New Jersey.

In 2007, Apollo Management acquired a minority interest in Bradco Supply. The following year, Advent International acquired a majority ownership in Bradco Supply. Also in 2008, founder Barry Segal retired.

In 2010, Bradco was acquired by ABC Supply. In 2013, ABC repurchased all outstanding shares from minority stakeholders, including the stakes the investors had in Bradco.
