= The Escorts (New Jersey vocal group) =

American R&B group

- The Escorts at Rahway Prison in 1970

Background information
- Origin: Rahway, New Jersey, United States
- Genres: R&B, soul, doo-wop
- Years active: 1970–2013
- Label: Alithia Records
- Members: Billy Martin, La’Grant Harris
- Past members: Reginald Haynes, Lawrence Franklin, Robert Arrington, William Dugger, Stephen Carter, Frank Heard, Marion Murphy

The Escorts, also known as the Legendary Escorts, were an American R&B vocal group formed by musicians incarcerated at Rahway State Prison in 1970.

== Background ==
While incarcerated at Trenton State Prison in 1968, founding member Reginald Prophet Haynes began practicing doo-wop singing with other incarcerated people. In 1970, after members of the group were transferred to Rahway State Prison, they first performed as the Escorts at a prison talent show, where they caught the attention of former Motown producer George Kerr.

In 1973, Kerr returned to Rahway with a mobile recording unit, resulting in the Escorts' debut album, All We Need is Another Chance, followed by Three Down, Four to Go (1974).

== Legacy ==
The Escorts have been sampled by hip hop artists including J Dilla (famously on his song Don't Cry) and Public Enemy. They are the subject of Corbett Jones' 2017 documentary film, All We Need Is Another Chance, and a version of the group has continued to tour as the Legendary Escorts. Jill Scott used the track from, "Look Over Your Shoulder", for her song, "Family Reunion" on her 2004 album, Beautifully Human.

== Original members ==
- Reginald "Prophet" Haynes (March 24, 1949 – July 11, 2020)
- Lawrence Franklin
- Robert Arrington
- William Dugger
- Stephen Carter
- Frank Heard
- Marion Murphy

== Discography ==
=== Albums ===
- 1973: All We Need Is Another Chance No. 41 U.S. R&B
- 1974: Three Down, Four to Go No. 57 U.S. R&B

=== Singles ===
Year	Title	Peak chart positions
Year	Title	US R&B
1973	"All We Need (Is Another Chance)"	—
1973	"Look Over Your Shoulder"	45
1973	"I'll Be Sweeter Tomorrow"	83
1974	"Disrespect Can Wreck"	61
1974	"Let's Make Love (At Home Sometime)"	58
1981	"Heart of Gold"	—
"—" denotes a recording that did not chart.

== See also ==
- Lifers Group – a hip hop group formed at Rahway State Prison (now East Jersey State Prison) in 1991
