= Keck Geology Consortium =

The Keck Geology Consortium, founded in 1987, is a collection of 17 collaborating colleges and academic departments generally focusing on promoting undergraduate research in the fields of geology and earth sciences. Primarily, the consortium organizes and funds undergraduate field research on projects around the world. Past project locations include field sites in Mongolia, Alaska, Norway, Italy, the Caribbean, and North America. The consortium's host school is Pomona College, in Claremont, California.

== Member schools ==
Following is a list of participating schools, bold text indicates a founding member.

- **Amherst College**
- **Beloit College**
- **Carleton College**
- Colgate University
- **The College of Wooster**
- **Colorado College**
- **Franklin & Marshall College**
- Macalester College
- Mt. Holyoke College
- Oberlin College
- **Pomona College**
- **Smith College**
- Trinity University
- Union College
- Washington and Lee University
- Wesleyan University
- **Whitman College**
