= Stanley R. Riggs =

American coastal geologist (born 1938)

- Born: May 20, 1938 (age 88); Watertown, WI, US
- Education: B.S. Beloit College (1960) M.A. Dartmouth College (1962) Ph.D. University of Montana (1967)
- Awards: North Carolina Award, O. Max Gardner Award, Francis P. Shepard Medal
- Honours: ECU Professor Emeritus

Stanley R. Riggs (born May 20, 1938) is an American coastal geologist and professor. In 1967, Riggs received his Ph.D. from the University of Montana and joined the faculty at East Carolina University as an assistant professor of geology. He retired in 1999, but returned to the university as a Distinguished Research Professor and was later honored as a professor emeritus. Since the early 1960s, Riggs has been dedicated to the study of coastal processes in North Carolina and beyond. His early work focused on tracking shoreline erosion rates. Riggs was vital to the establishment of ECU's geology and marine science programs and founded "ECU by the Sea," an interdisciplinary program combining biological and geological studies on Roanoke Island. His service on a United Nations project involving the utilization of resources in developing countries earned Riggs the O. Max Gardner Award in 1983.

Riggs's contributions extend to hundreds of works, including his books: The Battle for North Carolina's Coast and Cape Lookout National Seashore: Paradigm for a Coastal System Ethic. His research and service on advisory panels have informed North Carolina state policy. Through research grants from organizations such as the National Science Foundation and US Geological Survey, Dr. Riggs has consistently been able to expand the understanding of North Carolina's dynamic coastal system.

Riggs' research now deals with the ongoing changing climate dynamics occurring within North Carolina's coastal system across time. It is to be presented in a 10-part book series, of which Cape Lookout National Seashore: Paradigm for a Coastal System Ethic is the first installment. In 2013, Riggs founded North Carolina Land of Water (NCLOW) alongside long-time collaborator Dorothea V. Ames. The organization is dedicated to sustaining North Carolina's coast through public education and efforts to inform development.

== Early life and education ==
Riggs was born in Watertown, Wisconsin and grew up in the Green Bay area. He developed a passion for geology and marine biology and pursued the subjects post-secondarily. As a boy, in Wisconsin, Riggs explored bird migrations, swamps and lakes with his younger brother, John. Riggs received his B.S. from Beloit College (1960), M.A. from Dartmouth College (1962), and his Ph.D. from the University of Montana (1967), before becoming a professor at ECU. He would spend 55 years on the faculty.

== Work ==
=== Books ===
The following is a list of books authored by Riggs:

- The Soundfront Series: Shoreline Erosion in North Carolina Estuaries (2001)
- Drowning the North Carolina Coast: Sea-Level Rise and Estuarine Dynamics (2003)
- The Battle for North Carolina's Coast: Evolutionary History, Present Crisis, and Vision for the Future (2011)
- Cape Lookout National Seashore: Paradigm for a Coastal System Ethic (2025)

In 2025, with the release of Cape Lookout National Seashore: Paradigm for a Coastal System Ethic, the rollout of a 10-part series that will present the scope of Riggs' lifetime of work to a general audience began. The first volume is part of a trilogy covering North Carolina's southern Outer Banks.

=== Other ===
Riggs continues to contribute to academic literature and has been recently published in journals like PALAIOS. Some of his most referenced works present findings on barrier shore face morphology and phosphorite systems.

== Awards and recognition ==
For his work on a United Nations project, Riggs received the Oliver Max Gardner Award in 1983. This is awarded for contributions to the welfare of the human race. In 1986, he received a Queen Elizabeth II Senior Research Fellowship, awarded by the Australian Minister for Science. In 1989, Riggs was named a Geological Society of America Fellow and, in 1994, was recognized as a Thomas Harriot College of Arts and Sciences distinguished professor. He would later be honored as a professor emeritus. Recently, Riggs received the Francis P. Shepard Medal of the Society for Sedimentary Geologists (2021), and the North Carolina Award for Science (2022).

== Contributions ==
In addition to his work at ECU, Riggs collaborated with scholars at universities across North Carolina as an adjunct professor. His service on numerous panels concerning state issues has helped to shape policy and protect North Carolina's coastlines. He served on the Coastal Resources Commission's Science Panel and the Legislative Commission on Global Climate Change.

Grants in support of his research have come from the National Science Foundation, National Oceanographic and Atmospheric Administration, US Geological Survey, National Park Service, Environmental Protection Agency, and more.

With the founding of North Carolina Land of Water in 2013, Riggs and his collaborators set out to connect his research to North Carolina's communities and work to sustain the coast through a dynamic model. This involves supporting informed planning, educational programming, and land conservation efforts, as well as publishing accessible literature. NCLOW partners with organizations like NC Coastal Land Trust and NC Coastal Federation in its efforts.
