= Mindset List =

Annual compilation of the values that shape the worldview of students about 18 years old

The Mindset List is an annual compilation of the experiences that shape the worldview (or “mindset”) of students about 18 years old and entering college and, to a lesser extent, adulthood. It was published by Beloit College in Beloit, Wisconsin from 1998 to 2018, when it moved to the auspices of Marist University (then Marist College) in Poughkeepsie, New York.

== History ==
At Beloit, the list was co-authored by Ron Nief, Public Affairs Director Emeritus; Tom McBride, Professor of English and Keefer Professor of Humanities; and Charles Westerberg, Brannon-Ballard Professor of Sociology. It originated in 1997 as an e-mail forward, without author credits, passed on by then College Statistician Richard Miller to Ron Nief, who passed it on to peers at other schools. It reappeared in the fall of 1998 after requests from peers who mistook the forward as having originated with Ron Nief. Ever since, Nief and McBride have collaborated to create The List, and Westerberg joined them as a co-author starting with the Class of 2020 List released in 2016.

The List now appears every August as American first-year students enter college. It has been mentioned on the NBC Nightly News with Brian Williams and an essay by Nancy Gibbs of Time. In 2009, Time declared "mindset list" a new phrase in the American lexicon.

The Mindset List website had a daily quiz about growing up in the United States, a Mindset List Movie of the Month, “Mindset Moments” of reports about the generation gap, links to information about the current generation of young people, and an ironic advice column called Ask ROM. The List also appears on Twitter and Facebook.

On August 20, 2019, it was announced that Beloit College was distancing itself from, and would no longer sponsor the annual Mindset List. Marist College took over the publication of the list beginning in 2019 (the list for the Class of 2023). Marist pledged to take the list in a “more substantive direction,” with contributions from an interdisciplinary team headed by Associate Professor of English Tommy Zurhellen, an alumnus of Beloit.

== Book ==
The Mindset Lists of American History: From Typewriters to Text Messages, What Ten Generations of Americans Think Is Normal was released in 2011.

== Criticism ==
The website Beloit Mindlessness, run by Dan West of the Rochester Community and Technical College, calls the Mindset List “a poorly written compendium of trivia, stereotypes and lazy generalizations, insulting to both students and their professors, and based on nothing more than the uninformed speculation of its authors. It inspires lazy, inaccurate journalism and is an embarrassment to academia.” Beloit Mindlessness publishes posts critiquing specific items on the Mindset Lists.
