= East Jersey State Prison =

Medium-Security prison in New Jersey

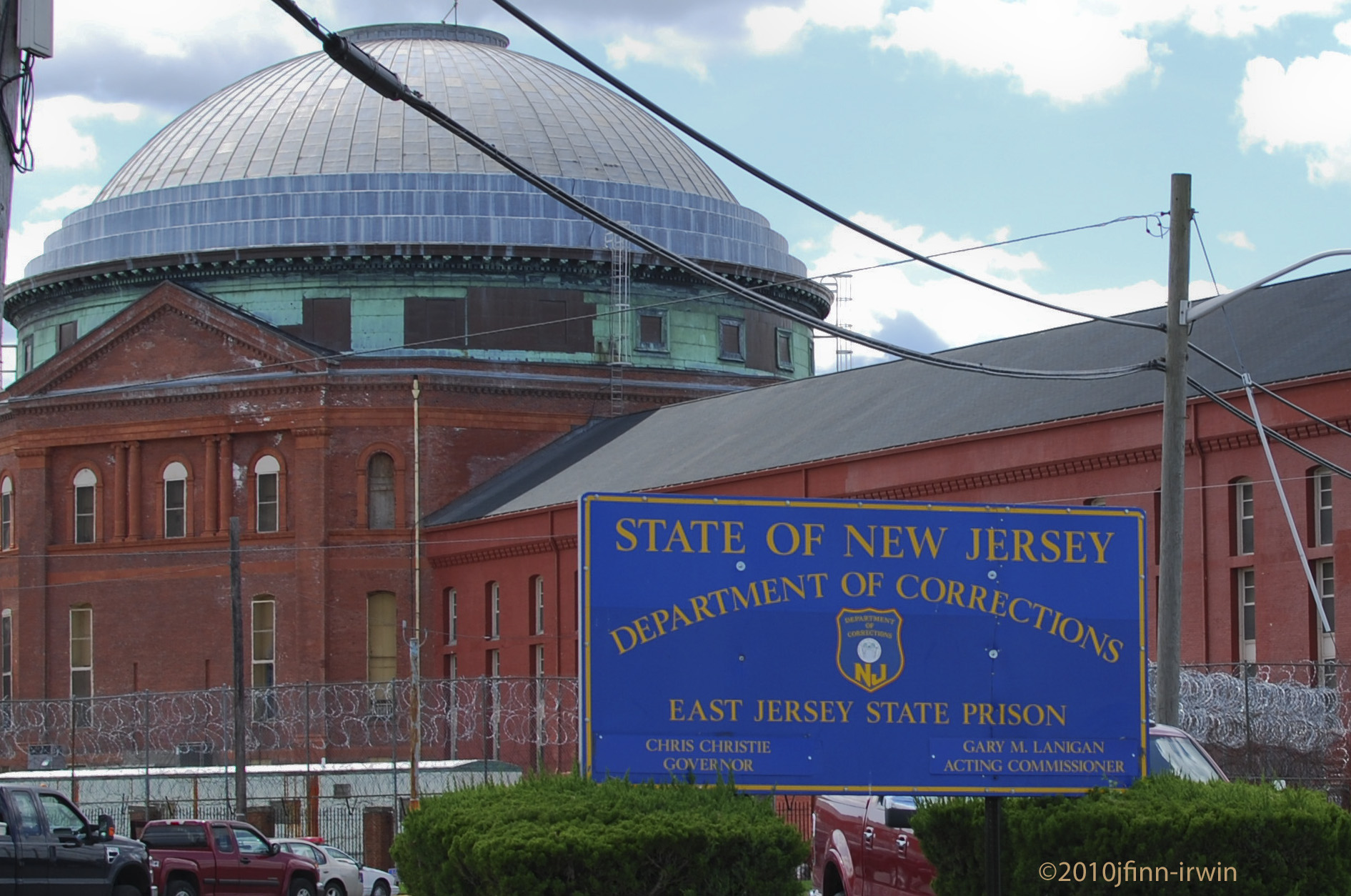
- Interactive map of East Jersey State Prison
- Location: 1100 Woodbridge Road Avenel, New Jersey; 40°35′28.7″N 74°16′02.7″W
- Status: Open
- Security class: Mixed
- Capacity: 1227 inmates
- Population: 1049 inmates (updated 2025)
- Opened: 1901
- Former name: Rahway State Prison
- Managed by: New Jersey Department of Corrections

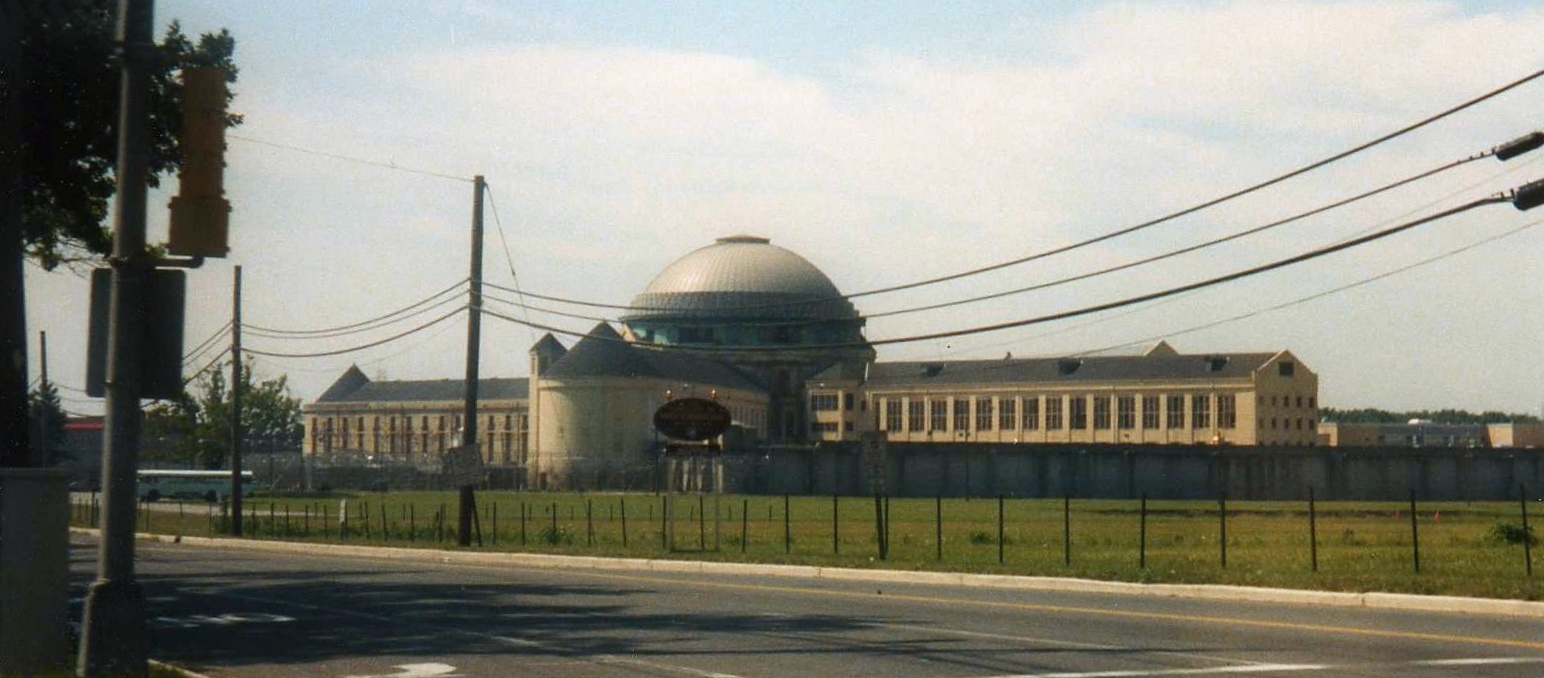
East Jersey State Prison (2007)

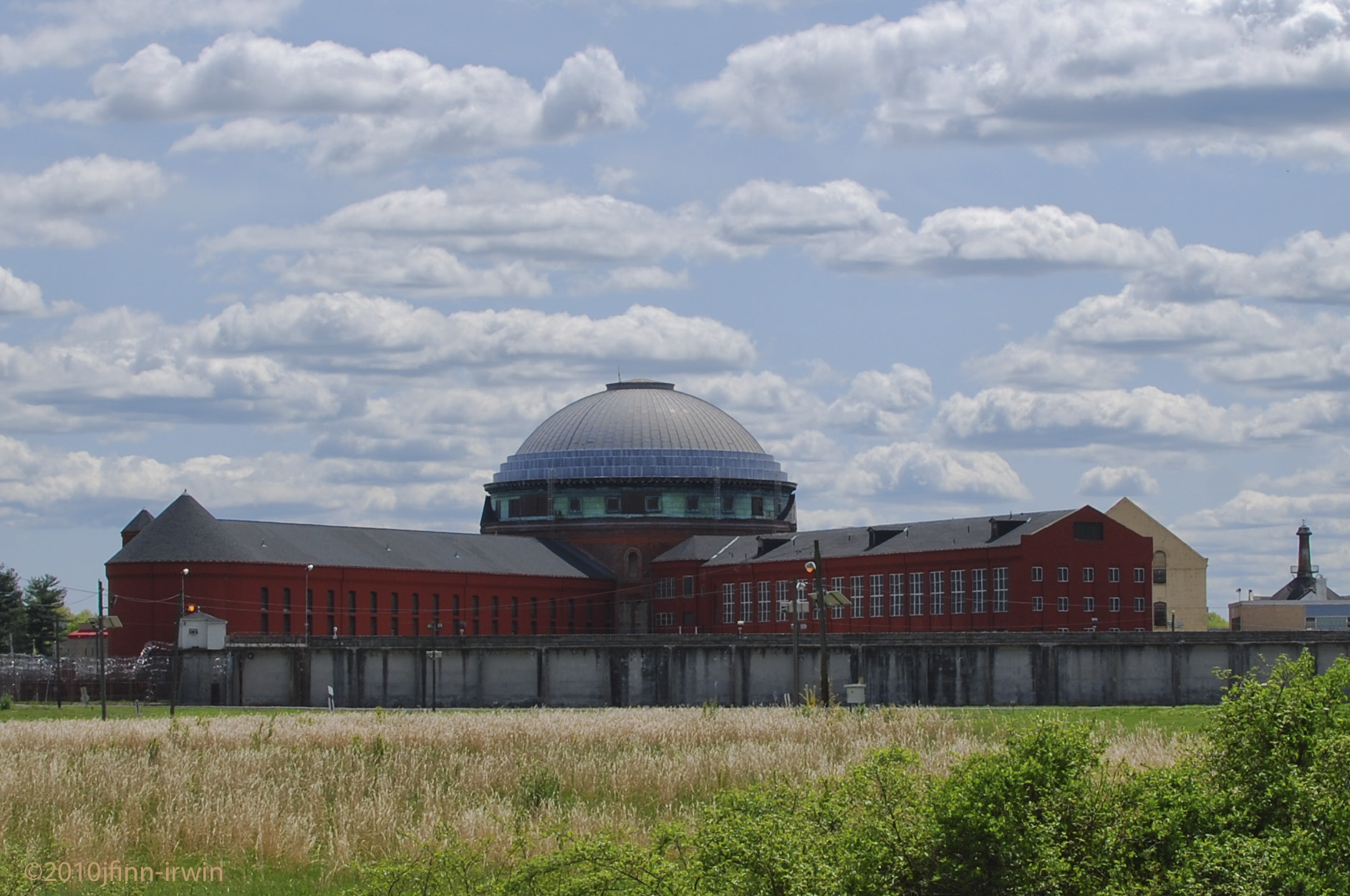
East Jersey State Prison (2010)

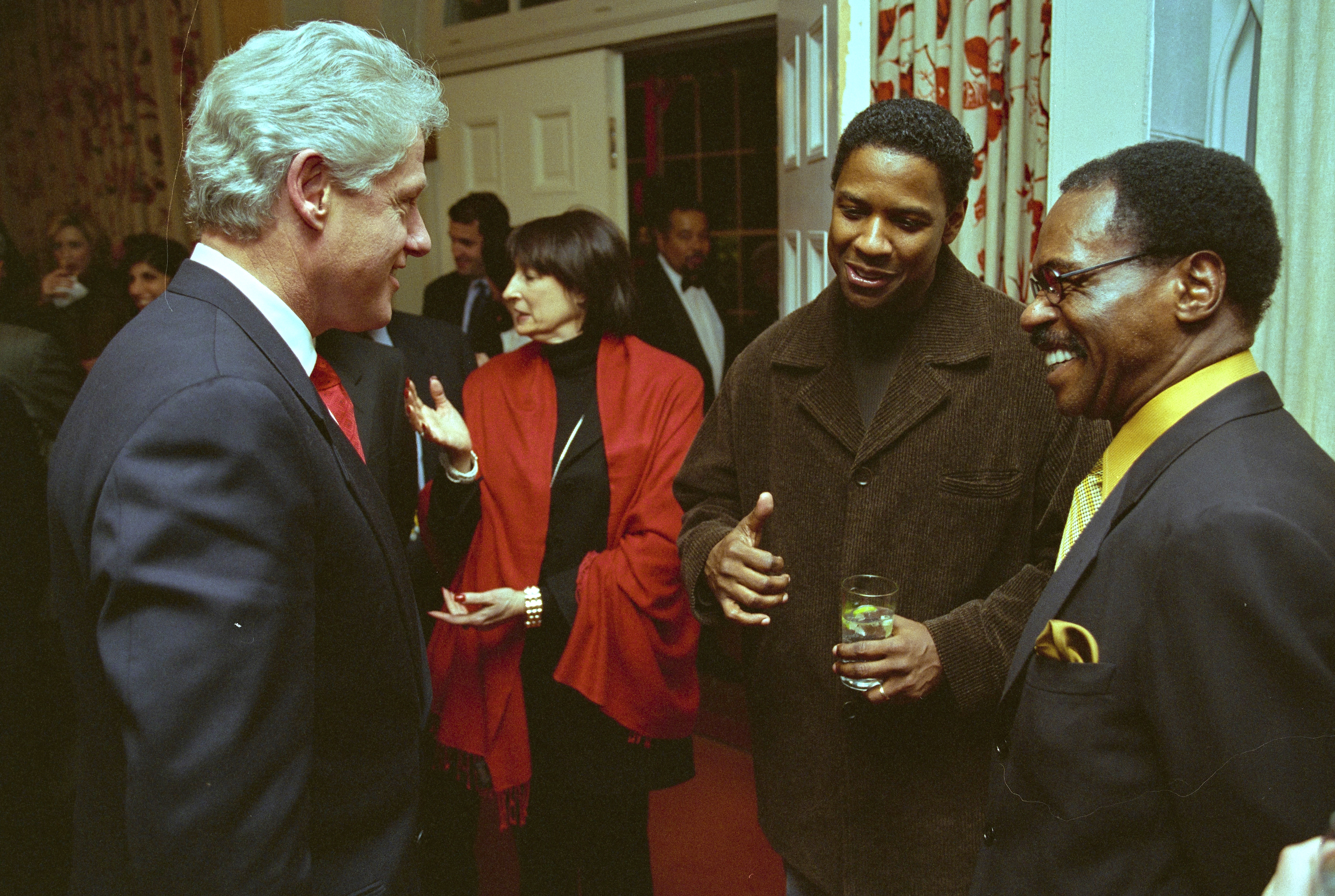
President Clinton greets Denzel Washington, and Rubin "Hurricane" Carter at a screening of “The Hurricane” at the White House. (Dec. 3, 1999, by William Vasta.)

East Jersey State Prison (formerly "Rahway State Prison") is a maximum security prison operated by the New Jersey Department of Corrections in Avenel, Woodbridge Township, New Jersey. It was established in 1896 as Rahway State Prison, and was the first reformatory in New Jersey, officially opening in 1901. It housed 1,227 inmates as of 2020. As of 2025, its population is now 1,049.

== General information ==
=== Buildings and grounds ===
- The prison's mailing address is in Rahway, NJ, but the prison is located outside of Rahway, in nearby Avenel, New Jersey.
- The prison's large dome is a well known, local landmark visible from nearby US Route 1–9 and New Jersey Transit's North Jersey Coast Line routes.
- The prison features a large walled compound 21 acres (85,000 m^{2}) in size, which contains the administration building, cell houses, classrooms, a chapel, shops, and other buildings.
- The prison was originally surrounded by hundreds of acres of farmland where inmates worked.
- Located just South of the prison is the Adult Diagnostic and Treatment Center (A.D.T.C.), New Jersey's facility for incarcerated sex offenders. Officers assigned to A.D.T.C. also operate the Special Treatment Unit (S.T.U.), which is the state's location for those civilly committed sexually violent predators. These inmates are typically ones who completed serving their time, but are not psychologically deemed safe to reintegrate into society and are extremely likely to re-offend.

=== Operational information ===
- Originally, inmates were categorized on a conduct-based "grading" system, in which inmates at different grade levels were granted varying privileges. Each inmate received a book of rules and regulations detailing expected appropriate behavior and the consequences of violating the rules. All inmates entered the system at the "second grade" level with the opportunity to advance or to be demoted.
- In the first years of operation, inmates woke at 5:45 a.m. with lights out at 9 p.m. Their typical day consisted primarily of school and/or work. Students went to classes for half the day and worked the other half. The prison offered vocational training and jobs, including tailoring, cooking, shoe-making, printing, electrical work, farming/gardening, plumbing, and painting.
- The Education Department of East Jersey State Prison offers a variety of programs to the inmates. Vocational training courses include auto-body, auto mechanics, culinary arts, painting and decorating, and horticulture. The prison offers primary education (A.B.E. Course) and secondary education (GED) courses to the inmates. Inmates who are high school or GED graduates can take college classes offered through Union County College's "Project Inside" program.

== History ==
=== New Jersey Reformatory ===
- In 1895, the New Jersey Legislature voted to establish the state's first reformatory, named the New Jersey Reformatory.
- The New Jersey Reformatory opened in 1901, housing 193 men between the ages of 16 and 30.
- In 1912, the number of inmates had increased to 525.
- In 1928, enrollment increased to 745. Of the 514 prisoners admitted during 1928, 304 (59%) were under twenty years of age, 164 (32%) were twenty to twenty-four, and 46 (9%) were from twenty-five to twenty-nine years old, with a racial breakdown of 406 (79%) White and 108 (21%) African-American.
- The first superintendent, J. E. Heg, served only for a year. He was succeeded by Joseph W. Martin, who led the institution until his death in 1909. Martin was succeeded by Dr. Frank Moore, who retired in 1929.

=== Construction and building upgrades ===
- Architect John Rochester Thomas (1848–1901), designed the original prison in 1895 and construction began on state-owned property, known as Edgar Farm in 1896.
- By 1908, there were two four-tiered cell houses. One cell house contained 256 cells measuring 9'x5'x8.6'H, while the other had 384 cells that were only 7.1'x5'x8'H. A 1928 inspection reported that the cells were equipped "with a fair quality of toilet and lavatory."
- In 1929, with the opening of nearby reformatories at Annandale (1928) and Bordentown (1937), Rahway State Prison changed from a reformatory to a prison for adult males.
- In 1930, construction began on additions to the institution. Between 1931 and 1932, industrial and laundry buildings were added.
- in 1932, the dormitory, "Two Wing", was built, housing 300 men, increasing the prison's capacity to 900 inmates.
- In 1951, Rahway's capacity was furthered increased to 1,000, when the last wing, "Three Wing", was constructed. As years passed, renovation on the institution continued.
- In 1967, one of the old buildings was improved and made into "Five Wing".
- From 1985 to 1988, trailers were erected and old buildings renovated (textile and laundry) for housing and dining facilities. These new additions became "Six, Seven, and Eight Wings".
- Around 2008, the yellow paint was removed from the brick of wings 1–4, restoring the brick aesthetics of the original 1896 building.

=== Riots and escapes ===
- From April 17–22, 1952, prisoners took officers hostage during a riot after officers beat inmates with nightsticks. The riot ended when the inmates were gassed.
- In 1971, on Thanksgiving Day, 500 inmates held 6 hostages, including the warden, for 24 hours. Six officers were injured, three with stab wounds in the early hours of the riot. The inmates demanded a more sufficient diet, regulation of commissary prices, improvement of the educational system and vocation training, better discipline of officers, and additional medicine supplies including aspirin. Ultimately, the prison was retaken with no loss of life and the captives were set free without the use of firearms.
- On August 11, 1972, three convicted murderers escaped by sawing through the bars of a third-floor window. Three officers were held responsible for the escape and suspended.
- In August 1980, in an effort to reduce the numbers of escapes, the prison issued gray prison uniforms to the prisoners.

=== Name change ===
On November 30, 1988, Rahway State Prison was renamed East Jersey State Prison. The change was lobbied by Rahway citizens, who claimed the name stigmatized the city and affected property values. Nevertheless, the prison is still commonly referred to by its former name.

== In popular culture ==
East Jersey State has established a reputation in popular culture due to its notorious and formidable living conditions, longevity and high-profile inmates. The prison has been a common setting for many documentaries, fictional movies, TV programs, music recordings and music videos. It also has been referenced in multiple books, news programs and songs.

=== Rubin "Hurricane" Carter ===
Rubin Carter was a former middleweight fighter who was convicted and sentenced to two life terms for murder and spent over 18 years at Rahway (1967–1985). While imprisoned, Carter wrote an autobiography called The Sixteenth Round: From Number One Contender to Number 45472, which was published in 1975. The book became instrumental in having his convictions overturned. The book made Carter's struggle become a cause célèbre, motivating legendary boxer Muhammad Ali to lead a march of 1600 people to the New Jersey state capital building in Trenton on his behalf on October 17, 1975.

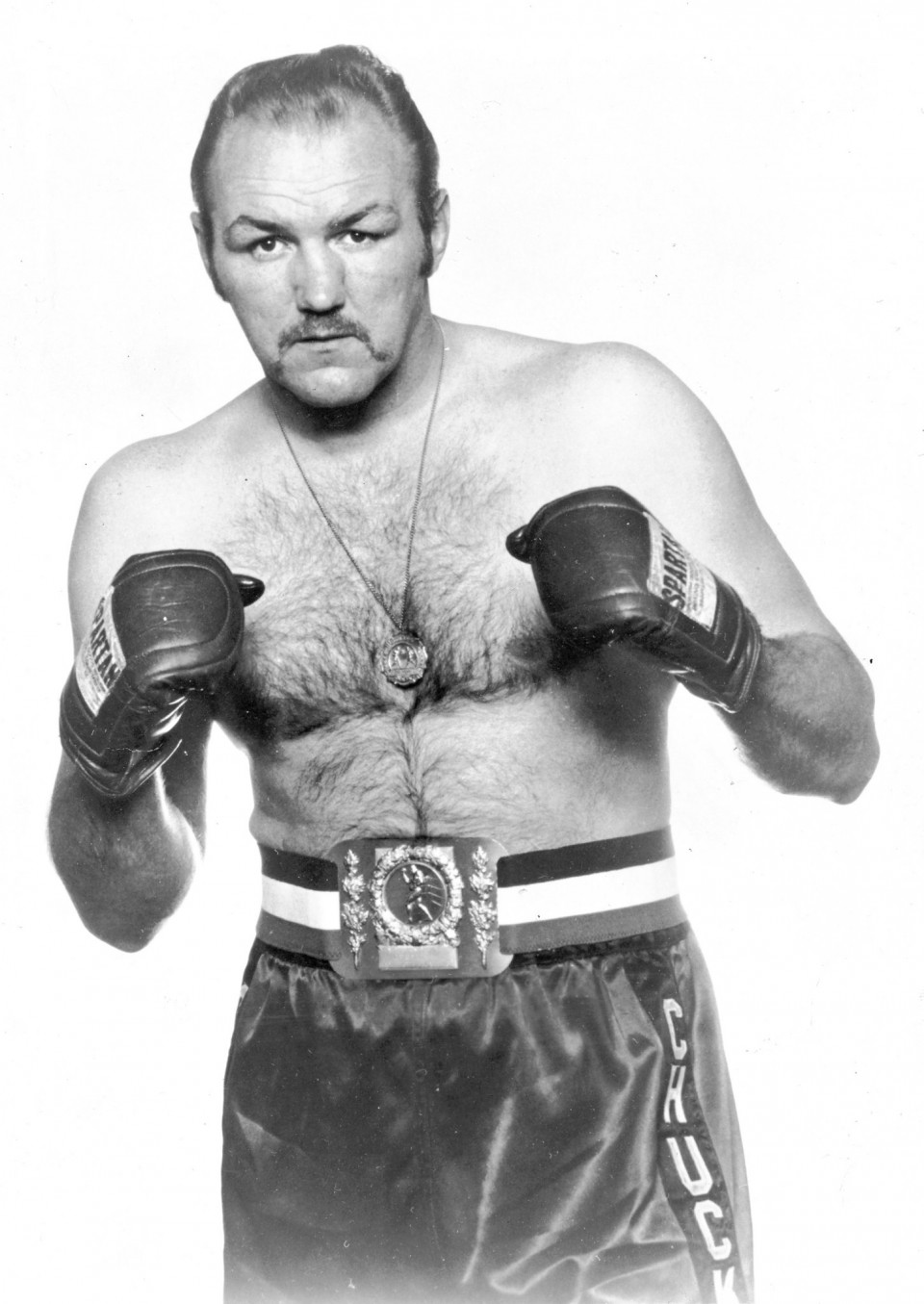
Chuck "Bayonne Bleeder" Wepner. undated photo

=== Chuck "Bayonne Bleeder" Wepner ===
Chuck Wepner was a heavyweight boxer in the 1960s–70s whose notable loss to Muhammad Ali in 1975 became the inspiration for Sylvester Stallone's Oscar winning movie Rocky. Stallone named the main character for his 1989 film "Lock Up" after Wepner. Stallone met with Wepner during filming at the prison, when he was an inmate. Wepner was also the inspiration for the major motion pictures, Chuck (2016) and The Brawler (2019).

Other high-profile professional boxers who were incarcerated at the prison:

- Dwight Muhammad Qawi (Dwight Braxton), Inmate sentenced to 5 years for armed robbery in 1973 who became a two-time world champion after his release in 1978.
- James Scott, a title contender, who had many bouts inside the prison itself, including a fight against Dwight Muhammad Qawi.

=== Music ===
- Tommy DeVito spent time in Rahway among other jails as a juvenile offender before eventually going straight as a guitarist for The Four Seasons in adulthood.
- The Escorts, a R&B vocal group, was discovered by record producer, George Kerr during an inmate variety show that Kerr attended with Linda Jones. Kerr relentlessly and successfully petitioned the federal government to record an album with the group of inmates incarcerated at Rahway in 1972. A mobile recording unit was brought to the prison where the group recorded their first hit album, All We Need Is Another Chance in just nine hours. The album would go on to reach #41 on Billboard's Hot Soul Singles after its release in 1973. Later in the same year, the group recorded a second album, 3 Down 4 to Go.
- Bob Dylan recorded the song, "Hurricane" in 1975 based on Carter's story. Dylan also held a concert, called Night of the Hurricane, playing for 20,000 people in December, 1975, just 3 months before Carter's first conviction was overturned. Also on the bill were Stevie Wonder, Isaac Hayes, Dr. John, Shawn Phillips, Ringo Starr, Stephen Stills, Richie Havens, and Carlos Santana.
- Lifers Group, a hip hop group, grew out of the Lifers Group Juvenile Awareness Program portrayed in Scared Straight!. In 1991, the group released an album and an EP, titled #66064, featuring songs, "The Real Deal" and "Belly of the Beast". A 30-minute documentary, directed by Penelope Spheeris, focusing on the group's songs and depicting life in East Jersey State, was released in 1992, and was nominated for a Grammy Award for Best Long Form Music Video
- "Rahway Prison" is mentioned in the lyrics of the Traveling Wilburys' 1988 song "Tweeter and the Monkey Man"
- "Rahway State" is mentioned in the lyrics of the East River Pipe song "Where Does All The Money Go?"
- Max B, the American rapper, was convicted in 2009 for multiple offenses, including murder. In 2016, his 75-year sentence was reduced to 20 years with a new release date set for November, 2025. He has since been transferred to Northern State Prison.

=== Television ===
- In 1999, in the HBO series,The Sopranos, East Jersey State Prison is mentioned by the character Sean Gismonte. (Season 2, Episode 8)
- On May 8, 2000, The History Channel's program The Big House, hosted by Paul Sorvino aired an exposé of the history of EJSP (Season 2, Episode 4)
- In 2003, the prison is mentioned in an episode of Arrested Development (season 1, episode 5,"Visiting Ours"). Character, George Bluth is concerned for his prison's softball team because they are "playing Rahway next week."
- In 2008, Rahway State Prison is mentioned in the Flavor of Love 3 episode, "Neverwed Game". Guest star, Arsenio Hall comments on Flavor Flav's clothes, saying that Flav looks good in the color orange, as long as it does not say "Rahway" across the front.
- In 2010, Rahway Prison is mentioned in Season 1, Episode 9 of Boardwalk Empire. As James Darmondy is escorted to a cell, he passes a friend Billy. Billy is upset as he is being sent "up river, to Rahway".

=== Books ===
- Rubin "Hurricane" Carter's autobiography, The Sixteenth Round: From Number One Contender to Number 45472, was published in 1975.
- The best-selling biography Hurricane: The Miraculous Journey of Rubin Carter was written by James S. Hirsch in 2000.

=== Movies ===
East Jersey State Prison's distinctive architecture and proximity to New York City has created a preferable filming location and a cultural nexus for many feature films and documentaries over the last several decades. Some of these films include:

1970s

- Crazy Joe (1974) – Starring Peter Boyle. The story of the life of Joseph Gallo, a member of the Colombo crime family.
- Scared Straight! (1978) – Narrated by Peter Falk. A highly acclaimed film that won the 1978 Academy Award for Best Documentary Feature and two Emmy Awards for Outstanding Individual Achievement–Informational Program and Outstanding Informational Program in 1979. Rahway prison became synonymous with this documentary, which was filmed entirely within the walls of the prison. It was a ground-breaking, raw, unscripted exposé of prison life, where inmates with life sentences (called "The Lifers' Group") fiercely warned delinquent teens of the brutal realities of prison life in attempt to keep them from repeating their own mistakes.

1980s

- Cat's Eye (1985 film) – Starring Drew Barrymore, James Woods: "Rahway Prison" referenced in dialogue.
- Something Wild (1986) – Starring Jeff Daniels, Melanie Griffith and Ray Liotta
- Lock Up (1989) – Starring Sylvester Stallone and Donald Sutherland

1990s

- City of Hope (1991) – (Reference made to the prison)
- Malcolm X (1992) – Starring Denzel Washington
- New Jersey Drive (1995) – Starring Shar-Ron Corley and Gabriel Casseus
- Prisoners of the War on Drugs (1996) – Documentary on prison systems in the U.S.
- Rounders (1998) – Starring Matt Damon and Edward Norton
- He Got Game (1998) – Starring Denzel Washington
- The Hurricane (1999) – The biographical drama of boxer, Rubin "Hurricane" Carter, starring Denzel Washington

2000s

- Primary Suspect (2000) – Starring William Baldwin and Lee Majors
- Ocean's Eleven (2001) – Starring Brad Pitt, Matt Damon and George Clooney
- Cadillac Records (2008) – Starring Adrien Brody and Beyoncé

2010s

- Jersey Boys (2014) – Directed and produced by Clint Eastwood based on the musical of the same name, telling the story of the musical group, The Four Seasons.
- Chuck (2016) – Biographical film, starring Liev Schreiber, depicting the life of former inmate and boxer Chuck Wepner and his 1975 title fight with the heavyweight champion, Muhammad Ali.
- The One That Got Away (2016) – A documentary about a Montclair, NJ teacher, who reconnects with his once promising student, Tourrie Moses.
- All We Need Is Another Chance (2017) – A documentary film directed by Corbett Jones about the R&B music group, The Escorts, whose first album was recorded at Rahway.
- The Irishman – Directed by Martin Scorsese, starring Al Pacino, Robert De Niro & Joe Pesci, based on the life of Teamster Frank Sheeran.
- The Brawler – Biopic based on the life of former inmate and boxer, Chuck Wepner.

2020s

- The Many Saints of Newark – A film prequel to the HBO series, The Sopranos, in which Tony's father, John, is sentenced to four years in "Rahway State Prison".
- The Whisper Man - The 2026 Netflix thriller starring Robert De Niro and Adam Scott.
