= Avenel, New Jersey =

Populated place in Middlesex County, New Jersey, US

- Census-designated place
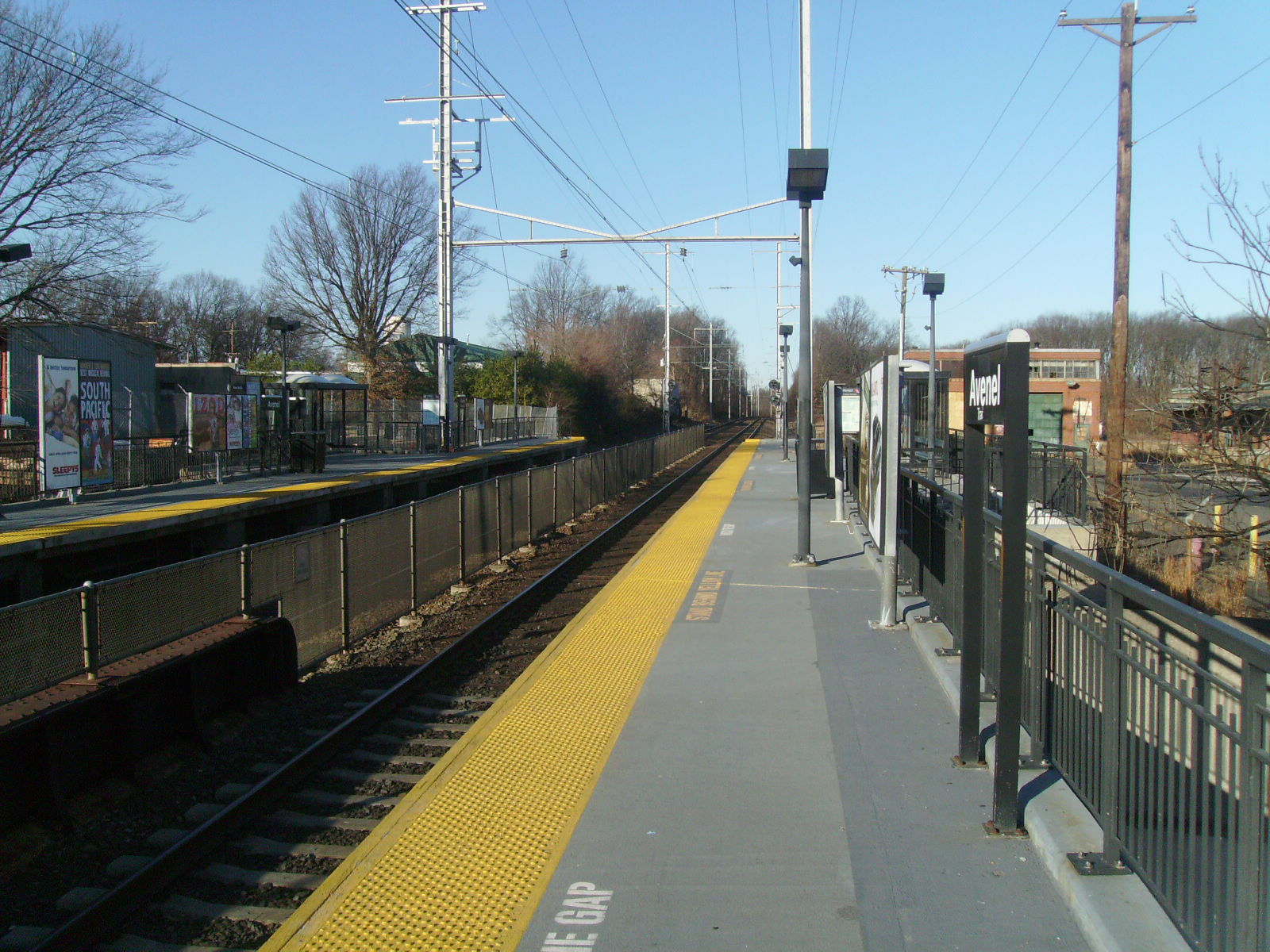
- Avenel station, serving New Jersey Transit rail passengers commuting to and from Penn Station in Midtown Manhattan, New York City

- Map of Avenel CDP in Middlesex County. Inset: Location of Middlesex County in New Jersey.

- Location in Middlesex County Location in New Jersey Location in the United States
- Coordinates: 40.584334°N 74.271626°W
- Country: United States
- State: New Jersey
- County: Middlesex
- Township: Woodbridge

Area
  - Total: 3.43 sq mi (8.89 km^{2})
  - Land: 3.40 sq mi (8.81 km^{2})
  - Water: 0.031 sq mi (0.08 km^{2}) 0.42%
- Elevation: 39 ft (12 m)

Population (2020)
  - Total: 16,920
  - Density: 4,973.5/sq mi (1,920.3/km^{2})
- Time zone: UTC−05:00 (Eastern (EST))
  - Summer (DST): UTC−04:00 (Eastern (EDT))
- ZIP Code: 07001
- Area codes: 732/848
- FIPS code: 34-02350
- GNIS feature ID: 02389160

Avenel (/ævənɛl/) is an unincorporated community and census-designated place (CDP) located within Woodbridge Township, in Middlesex County, in the U.S. state of New Jersey. Avenel is approximately 25 miles (40 km) southwest of Midtown Manhattan along the North Jersey Coast rail line.

As of the 2020 United States census, the CDP's population was 16,920, a decrease of 91 (−0.5%) from the 17,011 recorded at the 2010 census, which in turn had reflected a decline of 541 (−3.1%) from the 17,552 counted in the 2000 census.

== History ==
The community was established in 1901; it was named for the daughter of Captain Demarest, the founder of the village, which had formerly been known as Demarest on the Hill. Besides the Demarests, the first settlers included members of the Brown, Clark, Cooper, Crowell, Douglass, Edgar, and Thorpe families.

== Community ==
The area has three public schools: Avenel Middle School, Avenel Street School #4&5 and Woodbine Avenue School #23.

In 2019, the Avenel Performing Arts Center opened near the Avenel train station. The venue features a professional recording studio.

== Geography ==
According to the United States Census Bureau, Avenel had a total area of 3.532 square miles (9.15 km^{2}), including 3.517 square miles (9.11 km^{2}) of land and 0.015 square miles (0.039 km^{2}) of water (0.42%).

== Demographics ==
Historical population
Census	Pop.	Note	%±
1990	15,504		—
2000	17,552		13.2%
2010	17,011		−3.1%
2020	16,920		−0.5%
Population sources: 1950 1960 1970; 1980 1990 2000; 2010 2020

Avenel first appeared as a census designated place in the 1990 U.S. census.

=== Racial and ethnic composition ===
Avenel CDP, New Jersey – Racial and ethnic composition Note: the US Census treats Hispanic/Latino as an ethnic category. This table excludes Latinos from the racial categories and assigns them to a separate category. Hispanics/Latinos may be of any race.
Race / Ethnicity (NH = Non-Hispanic)	Pop 2000	Pop 2010	Pop 2020	% 2000	% 2010	% 2020
White alone (NH)	8,596	6,831	5,350	48.97%	40.16%	31.62%
Black or African American alone (NH)	3,296	3,129	3,125	18.78%	18.39%	18.47%
Native American or Alaska Native alone (NH)	35	65	41	0.20%	0.38%	0.24%
Asian alone (NH)	3,312	3,869	4,408	18.87%	22.74%	26.05%
Native Hawaiian or Pacific Islander alone (NH)	2	7	8	0.01%	0.04%	0.05%
Other race alone (NH)	64	50	125	0.36%	0.29%	0.74%
Mixed race or Multiracial (NH)	518	366	439	2.95%	2.15%	2.59%
Hispanic or Latino (any race)	1,729	2,694	3,424	9.85%	15.84%	20.24%
Total	17,552	17,011	16,920	100.00%	100.00%	100.00%

=== 2020 census ===
As of the 2020 census, Avenel had a population of 16,920. The median age was 35.8 years. 20.3% of residents were under the age of 18 and 11.1% of residents were 65 years of age or older. For every 100 females there were 114.5 males, and for every 100 females age 18 and over there were 117.1 males age 18 and over.

100.0% of residents lived in urban areas, while 0.0% lived in rural areas.

There were 5,738 households in Avenel, of which 35.7% had children under the age of 18 living in them. Of all households, 49.7% were married-couple households, 19.3% were households with a male householder and no spouse or partner present, and 25.8% were households with a female householder and no spouse or partner present. About 24.8% of all households were made up of individuals and 8.0% had someone living alone who was 65 years of age or older.

There were 6,078 housing units, of which 5.6% were vacant. The homeowner vacancy rate was 1.1% and the rental vacancy rate was 6.8%.

=== 2010 census ===
The 2010 United States census counted 17,011 people, 5,150 households, and 3,749 families in the CDP. The population density was 4,836.8 people per square mile (1,867.5 people/km^{2}). There were 5,379 housing units at an average density of 1,529.4 units per square mile (590.5 units/km^{2}). The racial makeup was 47.89% (8,146) White, 19.78% (3,364) Black or African American, 0.52% (88) Native American, 22.89% (3,893) Asian, 0.07% (12) Pacific Islander, 5.53% (940) from other races, and 3.34% (568) from two or more races. Hispanic or Latino of any race were 15.84% (2,694) of the population.

Of the 5,150 households, 36.0% had children under the age of 18; 54.0% were married couples living together; 13.5% had a female householder with no husband present and 27.2% were non-families. Of all households, 22.7% were made up of individuals and 8.3% had someone living alone who was 65 years of age or older. The average household size was 2.72 and the average family size was 3.23.

19.5% of the population were under the age of 18, 7.2% from 18 to 24, 35.3% from 25 to 44, 28.8% from 45 to 64, and 9.1% who were 65 years of age or older. The median age was 37.5 years. For every 100 females, the population had 127.5 males. For every 100 females ages 18 and older there were 135.8 males.

=== 2000 census ===
As of the 2000 United States census there were 17,552 people, 5,233 households, and 3,799 families residing in the CDP. The population density was 1,970.0 people/km^{2} (5,102 people/mi^{2}). There were 5,353 housing units at an average density of 600.8 units/km^{2} (1,556 units/mi^{2}). The racial makeup of the CDP was 53.52% White, 19.66% African American, 0.35% Native American, 18.90% Asian, 0.03% Pacific Islander, 3.65% from other races, and 3.89% from two or more races. Hispanic or Latino of any race were 9.85% of the population.

There were 5,233 households, out of which 36.7% had children under the age of 18 living with them, 55.9% were married couples living together, 11.9% had a female householder with no husband present, and 27.4% were non-families. 21.6% of all households were made up of individuals, and 7.5% had someone living alone who was 65 years of age or older. The average household size was 2.73 and the average family size was 3.23.

In the CDP the population was spread out, with 20.8% under the age of 18, 6.8% from 18 to 24, 42.8% from 25 to 44, 21.0% from 45 to 64, and 8.6% who were 65 years of age or older. The median age was 36 years. For every 100 females, there were 134.3 males. For every 100 females age 18 and over, there were 145.2 males.

The median income for a household in the CDP was $54,929, and the median income for a family was $61,029. Males had a median income of $48,000 versus $31,804 for females. The per capita income for the CDP was $19,794. About 6.1% of families and 9.6% of the population were below the poverty line, including 8.1% of those under age 18 and 6.6% of those age 65 or over.

As part of the 2000 Census, 13.65% of Avenel's residents identified themselves as being Indian American. This was the fifth highest percentage of Indian people in any place in the United States with 1,000 or more residents identifying their ancestry.

== Economy ==
Avenel was the flagship location of Bradco Supply, founded in 1966, one of the country's leading distributors of building products. The company had grown to over 130 locations in more than 30 states.

Amazon.com operates a fulfillment center in Avenel. The facility, which opened in June 2013, covers 565,400 square feet (52,530 m^{2}).

East Jersey State Prison is located in Avenel, near the border of Rahway; Though located in Woodbridge Township, the prison's mailing address had led to it being called "Rahway State Prison". Also located in Avenel is the Adult Diagnostic and Treatment Center, which provides treatment to convicted sex offenders.

== Transportation ==
The Avenel station provides direct service to Midtown Manhattan, New York City on NJ Transit's North Jersey Coast Line. Avenel Station is a direct 45-minute one-seat train ride to New York Penn Station. Riders can also connect with the PATH train to reach lower Manhattan.

In the wake of the creation of a 500-unit development transit village near the station and requests from passengers, NJ Transit began new weekday stops at the station starting in September 2019 and that weekend service would resume for the first time since 1985.

NJ Transit provides service on the 115 route between Avenel and the Port Authority Bus Terminal.

== Notable people ==
People who were born in, residents of, or otherwise closely associated with Avenel include:

- Antonio Alfano, American football defensive tackle for the Colorado Buffaloes.
- Eric LeGrand (born 1990), football player, writer, speaker.
- Jazlyn Moya (born 1997), footballer who plays as a forward for United Women's Soccer club New Jersey Copa FC and the Dominican Republic women's national team.
- Dagmara Wozniak (born 1988), Polish-American U.S. Olympic sabre fencer.

== See also ==
- List of neighborhoods in Woodbridge Township, New Jersey
- List of neighborhoods in Edison, New Jersey
- Oak Tree Road
