= ABC Supply =

American roofing supply company

ABC Supply Co., Inc.

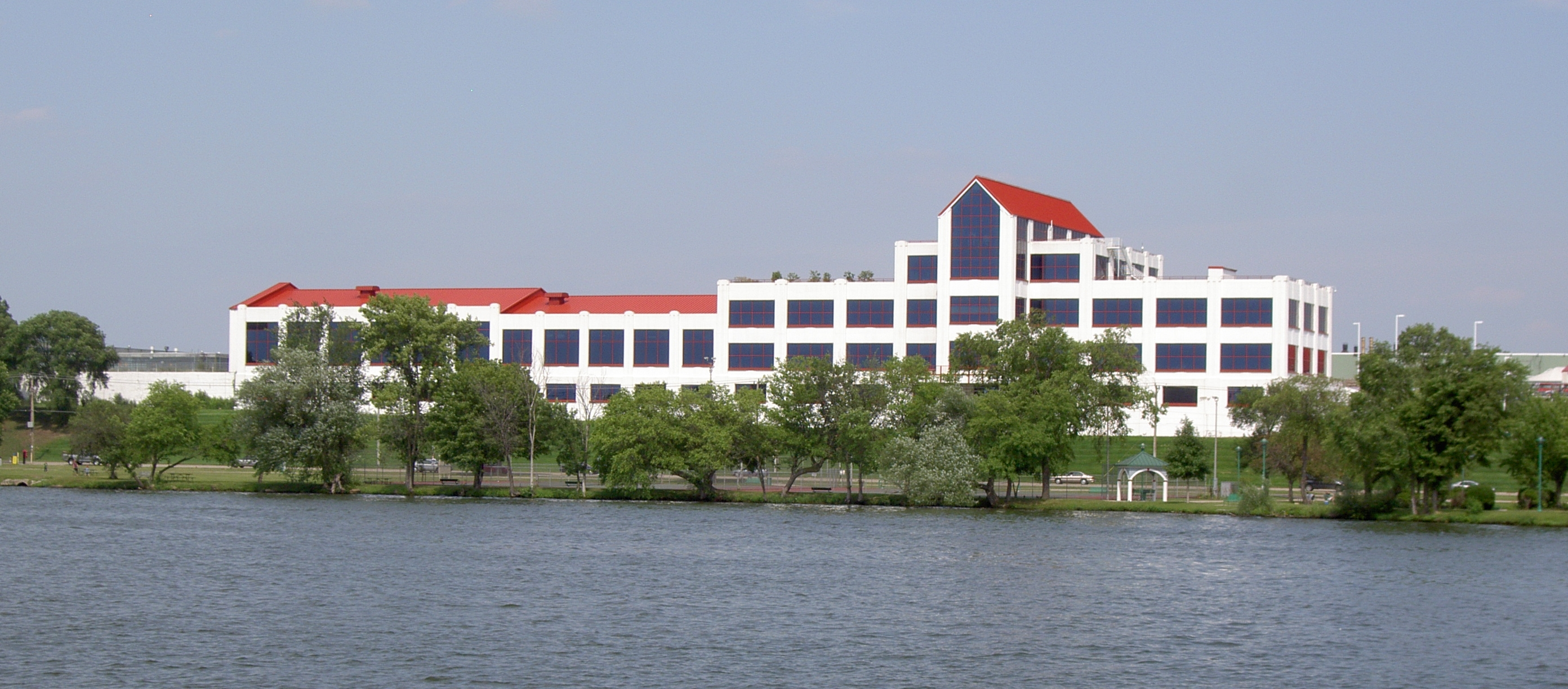
- ABC Supply headquarters in Beloit, Wisconsin
- Type: Private
- Industry: Roof and building materials
- Founded: 1982; 44 years ago
- Founder: Ken Hendricks; Diane Hendricks
- Headquarters: Beloit, Wisconsin, U.S.
- Number of locations: 970 stores
- Area served: United States
- Key people: Diane Hendricks (chair); Keith Rozolis (president and CEO); Todd Buehl (CFO)
- Products: Building materials and tools
- Revenue: US$20,400,000,000 (2023)
- Number of employees: 20,000
- Subsidiaries: Bradco Supply
- Website: www.abcsupply.com

ABC Supply Co., Inc. is a major, private American roofing supply company based in Beloit, Wisconsin. It also sells windows, gutters, and siding for residential and commercial buildings and is the largest roofing and vinyl siding wholesale distributor in the United States.

== History ==
The company was founded in 1982 by Ken Hendricks and Diane Hendricks.

ABC Supply has expanded from its original business. In early 2010, the company acquired Bradco Supply, its largest acquisition to date.

Following the accidental death of Ken Hendricks on December 21, 2007, company president David Luck was named CEO. Luck retired on December 31, 2013, and was replaced by Keith Rozolis.

In May 2020, one of the company's property locations was among those damaged by arson during the George Floyd protests in Minneapolis–Saint Paul.

In 2026, the company acquired Sandusky, Ohio-based Koch Building Products. Later that year, they purchased the assets of Martini Brick Sales, Inc.

== Awards and honors ==
The company has won the Gallup Great Workplace Award for eleven consecutive years, from 2007 to 2017.

== Corporate sponsorship ==
It sponsored A. J. Foyt Enterprises' #14 and #4 IndyCar Series cars.

ABC Supply holds the naming rights for ABC Supply Stadium; the home field of the Beloit Snappers.
