= Ken Hendricks =

American businessman (1941–2007)

- Born: Kenneth Albert Hendricks; September 8, 1941; Janesville, Wisconsin, United States
- Died: December 21, 2007 (aged 66); Afton, Wisconsin, United States
- Occupation: Businessman
- Spouse: Diane Hendricks (m. 1975)
- Children: 7
- Relatives: Skylar Simone (granddaughter)

Kenneth Albert Hendricks (September 8, 1941 – December 21, 2007) was an American businessman who, along with Diane Hendricks, his business partner and wife, grew a shingle supply company ABC Supply into a $2.6 billion fortune and a spot on the Forbes 400 at the time of his death. Primarily associated with Beloit, Wisconsin, Hendricks lived in nearby Afton.

== Business career ==
Hendricks, born and raised in Janesville, Wisconsin, was a high school dropout who joined his father in the roofing business, reshingling houses on weekends. He eventually started his own firm, which grew into a 500-man multi-state operation by 1971, a time when most roofers were still local. After giving the company to the employees so he would have more personal time, he started ABC Supply in 1982 with Diane Hendricks by purchasing three failing Bird and Sons locations. Through the years ABC Supply expanded to almost 500 stores through new start-ups and acquisitions. In 2006, with his personal wealth estimated at $2.6 billion, Hendricks was added to the Forbes list of the world's billionaires.

He also owned the Beloit Plaza mall and the former Beloit Corporation manufacturing complex, much of which has been completely redeveloped; ABC Supply took over most of the disused Fairbanks-Morse complex, as well. In 2008, he was posthumously awarded, with his widow Diane, a special "20 Year Award of Excellence" from the Downtown Beloit Association because they "nurtured a small movement" that re-energized the city business district.

Hendricks and his wife Diane owned and ran several other companies through the Hendricks Group. He was known for his interest in green building technology, and was set to build an environmentally friendly roof for a complex at the 2008 Summer Olympics in Beijing. Hendricks was involved in efforts to build a new stadium for the Beloit Snappers minor-league baseball team, and was the developer of a residential plot in Janesville.

In 2006, Inc. named Hendricks its 2006 Entrepreneur of the Year award and he was featured on the magazine's cover. Inc. had ranked ABC Supply its No. 1 Inc. 500 business in 1986, after which it was too large to list.

== Death ==
Hendricks died at age 66 on December 21, 2007, in Afton, Wisconsin, when he fell through a sub floor under construction and into the garage of his home. He left behind his wife, Diane Hendricks, and seven children, Kendra, Kim, Kathy, Kevin, Brent, Kara, and Konya.
