= Adult Diagnostic and Treatment Center =

Prison in New Jersey, United States

Coordinates: 40.5900°N 74.2738°W

- Interactive map of Adult Diagnostic and Treatment Center
- Location: 8 Production Way Avenel, New Jersey
- Status: Open
- Security class: Specialty
- Capacity: 700
- Opened: 1976
- Managed by: New Jersey Department of Corrections

The Adult Diagnostic and Treatment Center (ADTC) is a secure correctional facility operated by the New Jersey Department of Corrections. Its purpose is to provide treatment and incarceration for certain criteria meeting repetitive and compulsive male sex offenders who have been sentenced under the New Jersey Sex Offender Act.

From its opening in 1976 through at least 1994, ADTC is a unique facility, the "only complex of its kind in the nation devoted exclusively to the treatment of adult sexual offenders". The facility is located in the Avenel section of Woodbridge Township, New Jersey and in close proximity to East Jersey State Prison aka Rahway State Prison. Prior to the opening of the Avenel facility, the program occupied a housing unit at East Jersey State Prison known as "5-Wing".

ADTC houses and treats two groups of men: 1. Certain convicted sex offenders willing to engage in treatment who have been sentenced by the Court under the New Jersey Sex Offender Act to serve their sentences at the facility, and 2. Men who are not sentenced under the New Jersey Sex Offender Act, but have committed a sex offense. As of 1/1/2013, the facility had a population of 681.

== Levels and phases ==
Inmates are divided into "levels" and "phases" based on their therapeutic progress, institutional conduct and compliance, criminal history, outstanding warrants or detainers, and escape risk probability assessment.

The "levels" are based solely on therapeutic progress and range from Level 1 to Level 4, with Level 4 being the most advanced. Level 1 inmates engage in psychoeducational work using specially-prepared workbooks, usually assisted by "para-professional therapy aides", who are therapeutically advanced inmates who have been assigned to paid institutional jobs running therapy groups, providing para-professional psychoeducational counseling to newer inmates, and providing crisis intervention services to other inmates when their therapists aren't available (for example, after hours or on weekends). Level 2, 3, and 4 inmates participate in various modules dealing with subjects such as Anger Management, Arousal Reconditioning, Victim Empathy, and Relapse Prevention, as well as more general "process groups" where any therapeutic issues can be discussed. Inmates may also participate in groups run by para-professional therapy aides, which are videotaped for review by staff members and are limited to specific therapeutic issues.

The "phases" correspond to custody levels and determine, among other things, which jobs an inmate is allowed to hold. Phase 1 is the lowest level and corresponds to maximum custody. Phase 1 inmates are limited to jobs where they can be closely and directly observed by staff in the confines of the secure facility and perimeter. Phase 2 corresponds to medium custody and allows inmates to hold jobs that don't require as much supervision, but are still within the confines of the secure perimeter. Phase 3 corresponds to "gang minimum" status and allows inmates to work outside the secure perimeter with other inmates under minimal supervision. Phase 4 corresponds to "full minimum" status, which allows inmates to work outside the secure perimeter without supervision, or off the prison grounds with one-officer supervision.

== Release process ==
In order to be paroled and released from the ADTC, inmates must receive the recommendations of their therapists, two panels composed of other therapists employed at the facility, an external review board of community professionals officially known as the "Special Classification Review Board", and the New Jersey State Parole Board. The process typically takes several years after the initial recommendation by the inmate's therapist, which typically comes only after the inmate has been incarcerated for several years and has progressed to a Level 4 treatment status. As a result of the lengthiness and warranted thoroughness of the process, fewer than five percent of inmates are released on parole. The remainder "max out", which means that they will have served the maximum amount of time allowed under their sentences.

== Special Treatment Unit ==
NJDOC Inmates, who at the end of their sentences have been determined to be "Sexually Violent Predators", may be civilly committed to the Special Treatment Unit (STU). Previously located in Kearny, New Jersey, the STU is now located on the grounds of East Jersey State Prison, a few hundred feet from the ADTC. It is comprised in a prison like setting. There are several buildings enclosed by security fencing to include a recreational area. A smaller building called "The Annex", contains housing units made up of dorms, and a larger building which was the former East Jersey State Prison-Administrative Close Segregation Unit (ACSU), contains housing units made up of single person prison cells. The STU is known to many especially current or past staff as either the "Red Roof Inn" because for many years, the larger building (ACSU), had a red metal roof that has since been painted blue, or "The Gulag" because individuals are rarely released from the facility, and if they are released it is usually only after lengthy time frames of civil commitment. There is no set time frame for civil commitment therefore each Resident inmate's experience is different.

Upon being civilly committed as a "Sexual Violent Predator", an inmate is assigned the new designation of "Resident". Resident movements around the STU and their activities are closely monitored and controlled by the correctional staff. Residents live in the Special Treatment Unit in either dormitory settings or single person prison cells. Residents engage in weekly therapeutic sex offender treatment, alcohol/drug abuse classes, and recreational activities.

Residents must go through multiple phases of sex offender treatment. Each phase has requirements that must be met before moving onto the next phase. The result of these phases is to have the Resident go on supervised and then unsupervised furloughs into the community for limited amounts of time. During these furloughs they participate in drug/alcohol abuse classes, practice shopping for social skills education and relearning, look for employment, and stay in half-way houses when necessary. All outside actions are controlled by the NJ Parole and New Jersey social service/mental health staff. Residents are released back into society on a "Life Time Supervision/Parole" status per court order only after certain conditions are met. The Special Treatment Unit (STU) is not considered an actual prison but a "Treatment Facility", so the focus is more on rehabilitating Residents through participation in sex offender treatment, vocational learning activities, and recreational activities, instead of strict imprisonment. However, the STU is controlled in a prison-like manner. The NJ Department of Corrections- ADTC Corrections Officers maintain the security of the facility and control the daily operations of the STU. The NJ Department of Human Services staff control the therapy/treatment aspects of the STU. Both departments work together to ensure the STU runs properly and safely. Residents do not leave the STU, unless they are assigned as part of a daily outside cleaning detail, they are taking part in court ordered furloughs, or they are released from the STU per court order.

== Aftercare ==
Any inmate who was ever incarcerated at the ADTC (or the program's previous location at East Jersey State Prison), at any time during their life, is allowed to attend outpatient aftercare groups and group therapy sessions at the ADTC at no cost.
