= Rock, Rock County, Wisconsin =

Town of Rock, Wisconsin
- Town
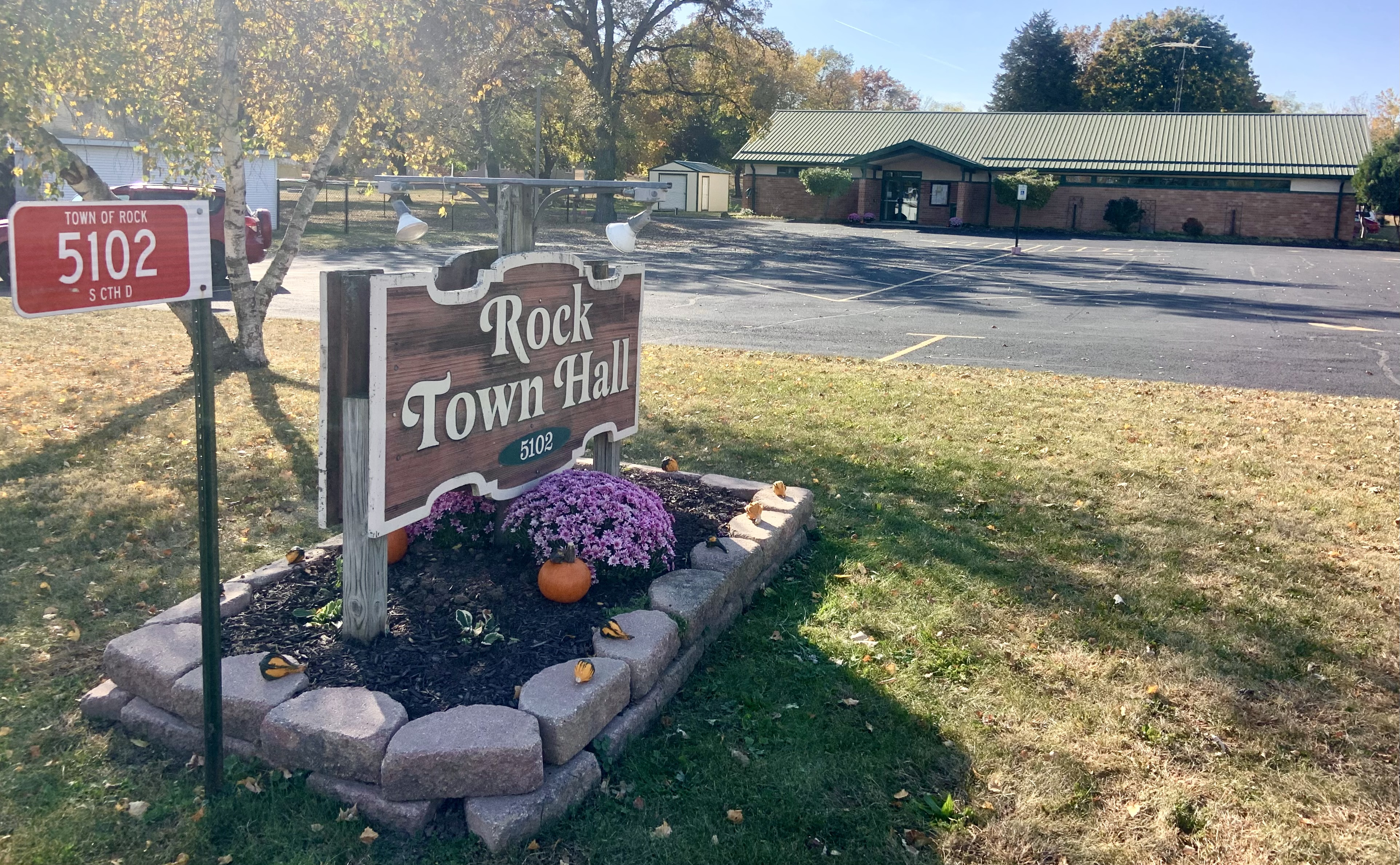
- Town hall

- Location in Rock County and the state of Wisconsin.
- Coordinates: 42°36′59″N 89°4′4″W
- Country: United States
- State: Wisconsin
- County: Rock

Area
  - Total: 30.0 sq mi (77.8 km^{2})
  - Land: 29.5 sq mi (76.5 km^{2})
  - Water: 0.50 sq mi (1.3 km^{2})
- Elevation: 748 ft (228 m)

Population (2020)
  - Total: 2,981
  - Density: 113/sq mi (43.6/km^{2})
- Time zone: UTC-6 (Central (CST))
  - Summer (DST): UTC-5 (CDT)
- Area code: 608
- FIPS code: 55-68600
- GNIS feature ID: 1584048
- Website: http://www.townofrockwi.gov

The Town of Rock is a located in Rock County, Wisconsin, United States. The population was 2,981 at the 2020 census. The unincorporated community of Afton is in the town.

== Geography ==
According to the United States Census Bureau, the town has a total area of 30.0 square miles (77.8 km^{2}), of which 29.5 square miles (76.5 km^{2}) is land and 0.5 square mile (1.3 km^{2}) (1.70%) is water.

== Demographics ==
As of the census of 2000, there were 3,338 people, 1,304 households, and 903 families residing in the town. The population density was 113.0 people per square mile (43.6/km^{2}). There were 1,358 housing units at an average density of 46.0 per square mile (17.8/km^{2}). The racial makeup of the town was 95.48% White, 1.20% African American, 0.30% Native American, 0.39% Asian, 0.27% Pacific Islander, 1.08% from other races, and 1.29% from two or more races. Hispanic or Latino of any race were 2.10% of the population.

There were 1,304 households, out of which 31.1% had children under the age of 18 living with them, 54.6% were married couples living together, 10.1% had a female householder with no husband present, and 30.7% were non-families. 22.9% of all households were made up of individuals, and 7.0% had someone living alone who was 65 years of age or older. The average household size was 2.52 and the average family size was 2.93.

In the town, the population was spread out, with 24.4% under the age of 18, 7.8% from 18 to 24, 30.2% from 25 to 44, 26.5% from 45 to 64, and 11.0% who were 65 years of age or older. The median age was 37 years. For every 100 females, there were 104.3 males. For every 100 females age 18 and over, there were 105.4 males.

The median income for a household in the town was $46,151, and the median income for a family was $54,868. Males had a median income of $35,000 versus $24,789 for females. The per capita income for the town was $20,635. About 2.2% of families and 5.5% of the population were below the poverty line, including 5.7% of those under age 18 and 7.3% of those age 65 or over.

== Transportation ==
- Southern Wisconsin Regional Airport
- Beloit Transit and the Janesville Transit System jointly operate the Beloit-Janesville Express bus route through the town.
