= Wisconsin Highway 184 =

State highway in Wisconsin, United States

State Trunk Highway 184

Route information
- Length: 12.04 mi (19.38 km)
- Existed: 1947–1999

Major junctions
- South end: WIS 11 east of Footville
- North end: WIS 59 north of Fulton

Location
- Country: United States
- State: Wisconsin
- Counties: Rock

Highway system
- Wisconsin State Trunk Highway System; Interstate; US; State; Scenic; Rustic
← WIS 183	→ WIS 185

State Trunk Highway 184 (often called Highway 184, STH-184 or WIS 184) was a state highway in the U.S. state of Wisconsin. It ran north–south between Footville and Fulton. In 1999, the road was turned over to Rock County, which maintains it as County Trunk Highway H (CTH-H).

== Route description ==
WIS 184 began at a junction with WIS 11 east of Footville. The highway headed north to Leyden, where it intersected U.S. Route 14. WIS 184 continued north from here to the community of Fulton, passing near the Rock River. The route terminated north of Fulton at WIS 59. The highway was located entirely within Rock County.

== History ==
WIS 184 was designated in 1947 in Rock County when 12 miles (19 km) of CTH-H were turned over to the state. The highway's routing was not changed during its existence. On October 4, 1999, the highway was transferred back to the county and once again renamed CTH-H.

== Major intersections ==
The entire route was in Rock County.

Location	mi	km	Destinations	Notes
Town of Center	0.00	0.00	WIS 11	
Center–Janesville town line			US 14	
Porter–Fulton town line	12.04	19.38	WIS 59	
1.000 mi = 1.609 km; 1.000 km = 0.621 mi
