= Mary Stebbins Savage =

American author, poet (1850–1915)

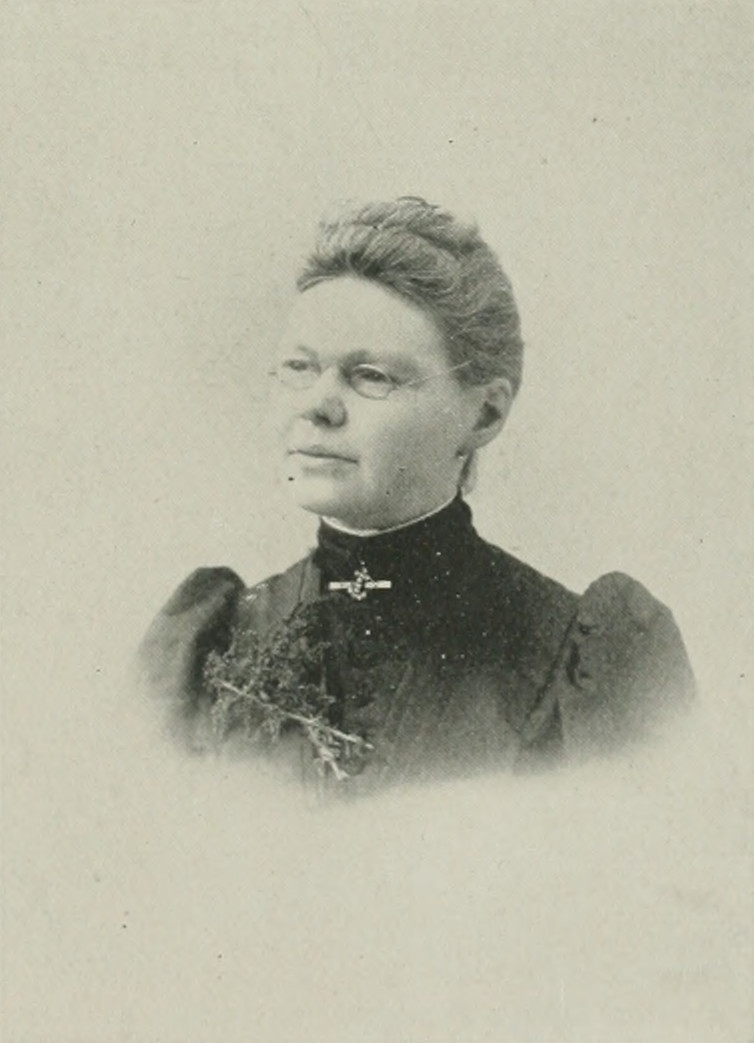
- Portrait photo in A Woman of the Century
- Born: Mary Therese Stebbins; March 25, 1850; Porter, Wisconsin, U.S.
- Died: December 17, 1915 (aged 65); Boise, Idaho, U.S.
- Resting place: Morris Hill Cemetery
- Occupation: Writer
- Spouse: Edwin Parker Savage (m. 1876)
- Children: 4
- Writing career
- Pen name: Marion Lisle
- Genres: Poetry; hymns; prose
- Notable work: "The Path Through the Sagebrush"

Mary Stebbins Savage (née Stebbins; nickname, Minnie; pen name, Marion Lisle; 1850-1915) was an American writer of poetry and prose. For many years, she served as poet laureate of Wisconsin's "Home Comings" event. Savage was also associated with the temperance and woman's suffrage movements in her state.

== Early life ==
Mary Therese Stebbins was born in the town of Porter, Wisconsin, March 25, 1850. Her father was Harrison Stebbins, a well-to-do farmer and an influential man in Rock County, serving in the Wisconsin State Assembly. Her mother's maiden name was Mary Bassett. Both parents were of New England ancestry and both had a taste for literature. Mary had two siblings, a brother, Shapley Stebbins, who took over the farm, and a sister, Flora Gilley.

Mary's childhood and early adulthood were passed in a country homestead. The Stebbins home was built of stone and was almost palatial in type. On the third floor was a ballroom where on many occasions, the New England settlers gathered from the countryside in early Wisconsin days. Her Steinway piano was one of the first brought to the state. There were hills and groves on this farm and one entered the grounds through a long avenue with overhanging trees.

Imperfect health and consequent leisure, good books and pictures, the piano and standard periodicals influenced her. Mary "was a prominent figure in Cooksville and Stebbinsville literary circles, sharing her Steinway piano and poetic accomplishments." She also acted in local theater productions.

== Career ==
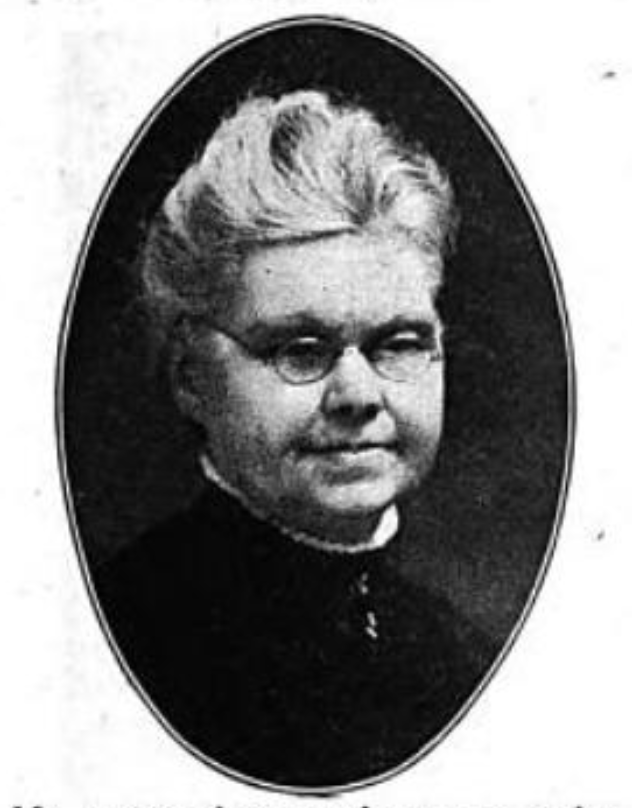
Mary Stebbins Savage (undated)

Savage wrote scores of poems, perhaps hundreds, as well as prose. Her contributions covered a long period, and appeared in the Woman's Journal, the Woman's Tribune, the Christian Register, Unity, the Chicago Inter Ocean, the Weekly Wisconsin and other journals. Her poem "Whip-poor-will" (1885), originally published by Unity, commanded the appreciation of John White Chadwick, and was later picked up by a London exchange. "The Path Through the Sagebrush" has perhaps the most complete expression, finished and without flaw, of anything she has done. Her productions also included hymn poems, such as "The Implied Faith", written during the last year of her life. It was adapted to modern hymnology to be sung to any long meter tunes.

For many years, she was poet laureate of Wisconsin's "Home Comings", where every June, she would read her poetry to those assembled at Palmyra, Wisconsin.

Savage was long identified with temperance work in Wisconsin. Both in her writings and in practical personal efforts, she was also associated with the woman's suffrage movement.

== Personal life ==
After marrying Edwin Parker Savage in 1876, she moved to a farm in nearby Cooksville, Wisconsin. The couple had four children, three sons and a daughter, a son dying in infancy. Their son, John L. Savage, who became a renowned civil engineer, was born in the family home, which was listed on the National Register of Historic Places and on the Wisconsin Register of Historic Places. No later than 1902, the family moved from the farm to Madison, Wisconsin that the children might have a university education. Lastly, widowed, she followed the daughter and sons to Boise, Idaho.

In religion, she was active in Unitarian Church work.

Mary Stebbins Savage died in Boise, Idaho on December 17, 1915 and was buried in that city's Morris Hill Cemetery, two days later.

== Selected works ==
=== Poems ===
- 1885, "Whip-poor-will"
- 1886, "City and Country Again"
- 1886, "Love Hath the Victory
- 1886, "On Him I Believe"
- 1886, "The Fount of Youth"
- 1886, "The Prohibitionist"
- 1915, "The Flag of Great Dreams"
- 1914, "Forest Fires"
- 1884, "The Harvest Hand"
- 1917, "This Little Church we Love"
- 1917, "The Patriot"
- (undated), "The Path Through the Sagebrush"
- (undated), "The Implied Faith"

=== Prose ===
- "The Mission of a Hearth-Rug", 1883
- "One Saturday Night", 1879
- "Pearl Haskell", 1888
- "Robbie and the Peace Flag", 1915
