= Center, Wisconsin =

Center is the name of some places in the U.S. state of Wisconsin:

- Center (community), Wisconsin, an unincorporated community
- Center, Outagamie County, Wisconsin, a town
- Center, Rock County, Wisconsin, a town
- Center, Lafayette County, Wisconsin, a former name for the town of Darlington (town), Wisconsin
