= 1926 United States Senate election in Wisconsin =

- November 2, 1926
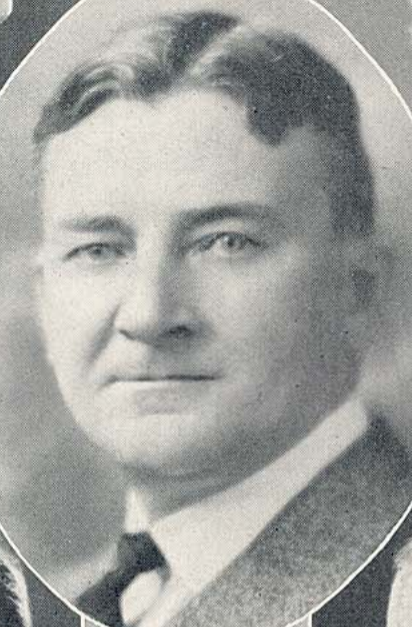

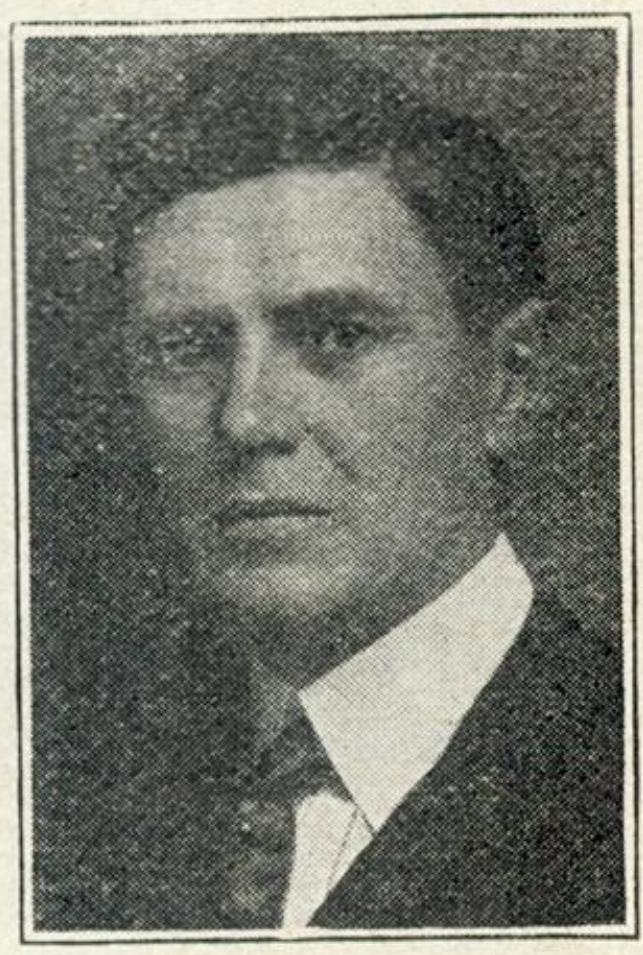

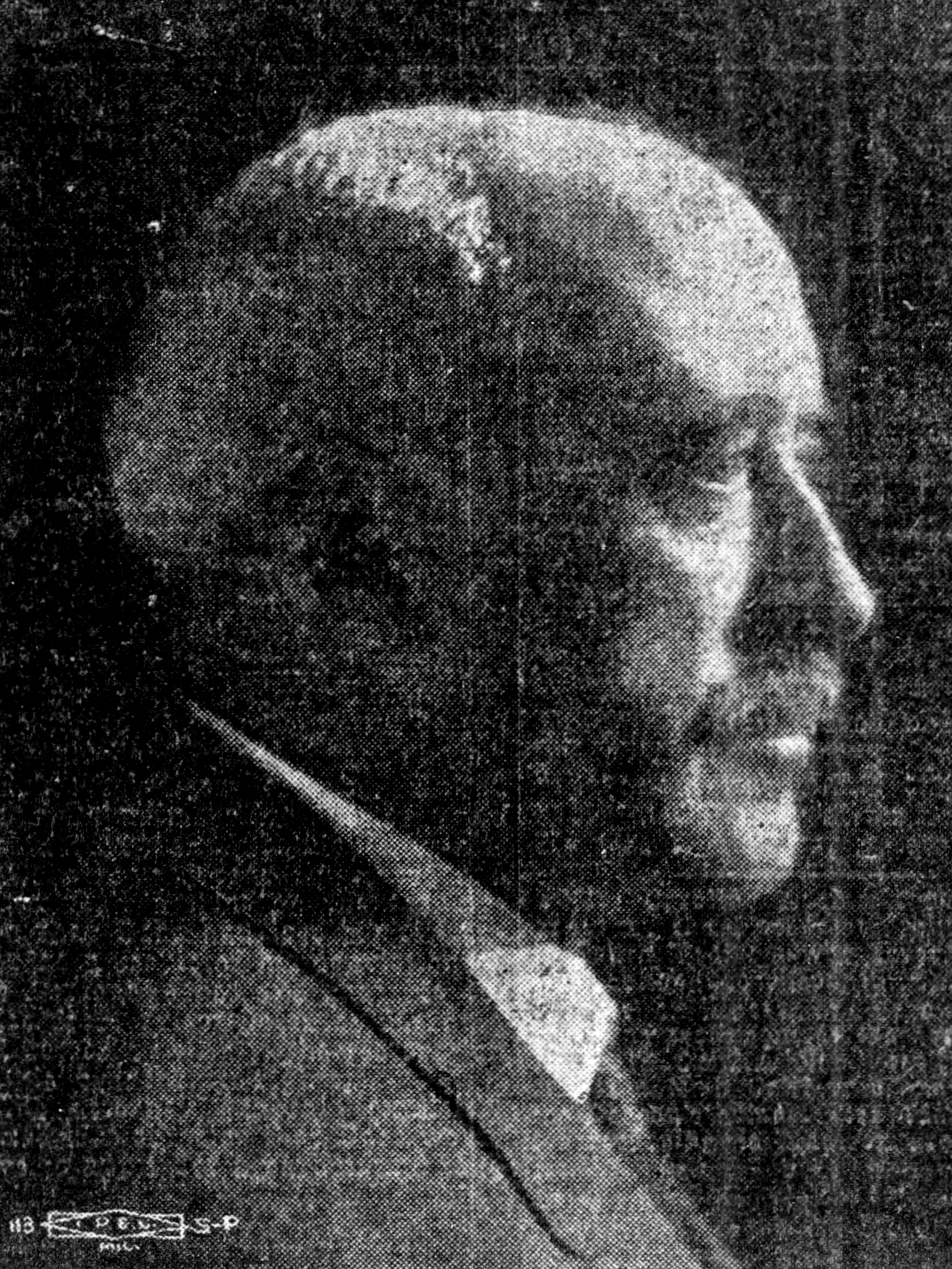

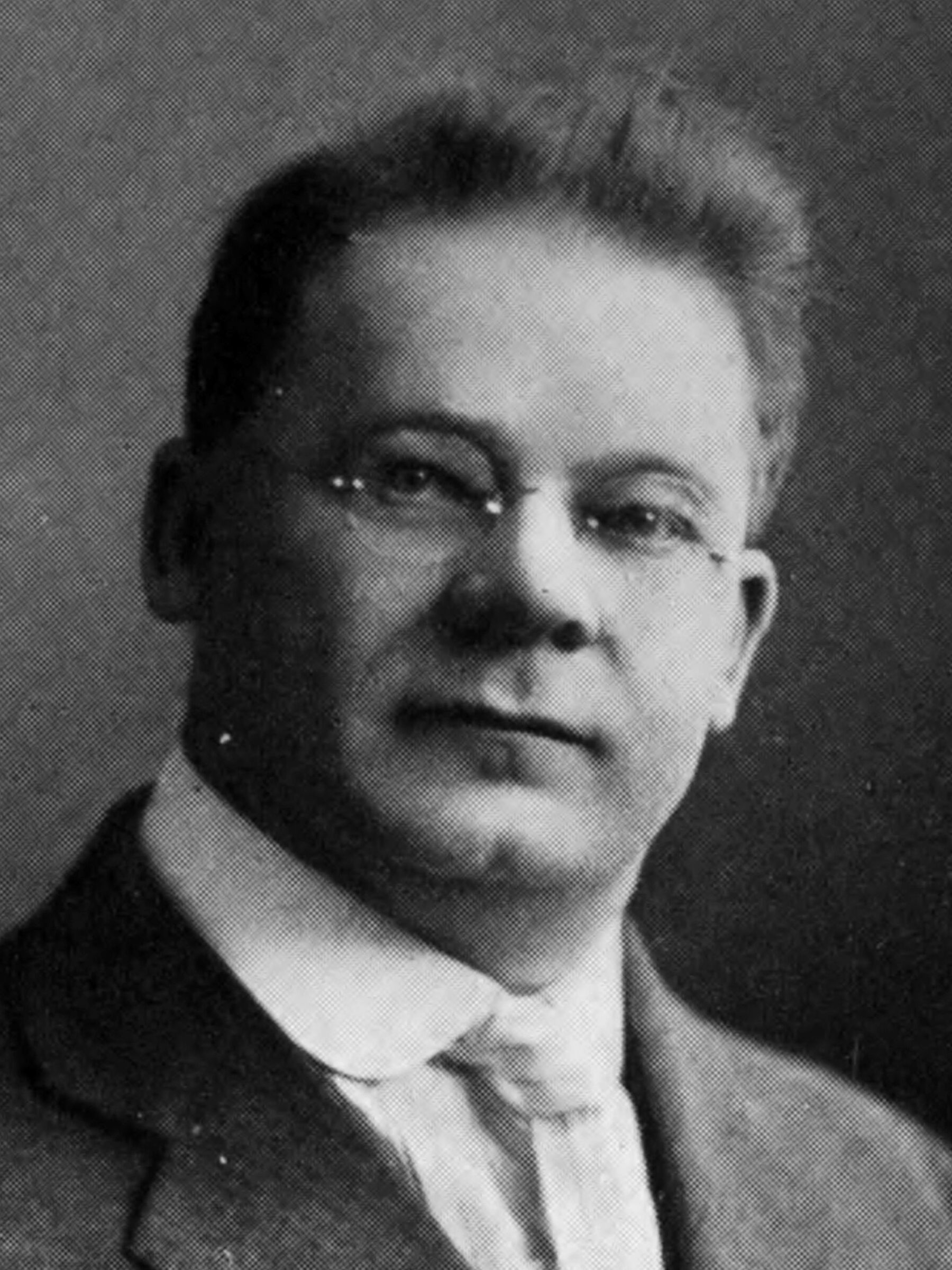
Nominee	John J. Blaine	Charles D. Rosa
Party	Republican	Independent Republican
Popular vote	299,759	111,122
Percentage	54.94%	20.37%
Nominee	Thomas M. Kearney	Leo Krzycki
Party	Democratic	Social-Democratic
Popular vote	66,672	31,317
Percentage	12.22%	5.74%
- County results Blaine: 40–50% 50–60% 60–70% 70–80% 80–90% Rosa: 40–50% 50–60%
U.S. senator before election
Irvine Lenroot
Republican
Elected U.S. Senator
John J. Blaine
Republican

The 1926 United States Senate election in Wisconsin was held on November 2, 1926. Incumbent Senator Irvine Lenroot ran for a second term in office but lost the Republican primary to Governor John J. Blaine. Blaine won the general election over Democratic nominee Thomas Kearney and Social-Democratic Leo Krzycki; his primary opposition, however, came from independent Republican candidate Charles D. Rosa.

== Republican primary ==
=== Candidates ===
- John J. Blaine, Governor of Wisconsin since 1921
- Frank J. Kelly
- Irvine Lenroot, incumbent Senator since 1918

=== Results ===
1926 U.S. Senate Republican primary
Party	Candidate	Votes	%
Republican	John J. Blaine	233,803	50.10%
Republican	Irvine Lenroot (incumbent)	208,738	44.73%
Republican	Frank J. Kelly	24,096	5.16%
Total votes		466,637	100.00%

== Other primaries ==
=== Democratic ===
1926 U.S. Senate Democratic primary
Party	Candidate	Votes	%
Democratic	Thomas M. Kearney	16,003	100.00%
Total votes		16,003	100.00%

=== Prohibition ===
1926 U.S. Senate Prohibition primary
Party	Candidate	Votes	%
Prohibition	Ella T. Sanford	683	100.00%
Prohibition	Alfred B. Taynton	600	100.00%
Total votes		1,283	100.00%

=== Social-Democratic ===
1926 U.S. Senate Social-Democratic primary
Party	Candidate	Votes	%
Social-Democratic	Leo Krzycki	10,791	100.00%
Total votes		10,791	100.00%

== General election ==
=== Candidates ===
- John J. Blaine, Governor of Wisconsin since 1921 (Republican)
- Thomas M. Kearney (Democratic)
- Richard Koeppel (Independent Socialist-Labor)
- Leo Krzycki, labor leader and candidate for U.S. Representative in 1918 and 1924 (Social-Democratic)
- Charles D. Rosa, Madison attorney and former Assemblyman from Beloit (Independent Progressive Republican)
- Ella T. Sanford (Prohibition)
- J. N. Tittemore (Independent)

=== Results ===
1926 U.S. Senate election in Wisconsin
Party	Candidate	Votes	%	±%
Republican	John J. Blaine	299,759	54.94%	
Independent Republican	Charles D. Rosa	111,122	20.37%	
Democratic	Thomas M. Kearney	66,672	12.22%	
Social-Democratic	Leo Krzycki	31,317	5.74%	
Independent	J. N. Tittemore	23,822	4.37%	
Prohibition	Ella T. Sanford	9,885	1.81%	
Socialist Labor	Richard Koeppel	3,061	0.56%	
Total votes		545,638	100.00%	
Republican hold		Swing		

== See also ==
- 1926 United States Senate elections
