= John L. Savage =

American civil engineer (1879–1967)

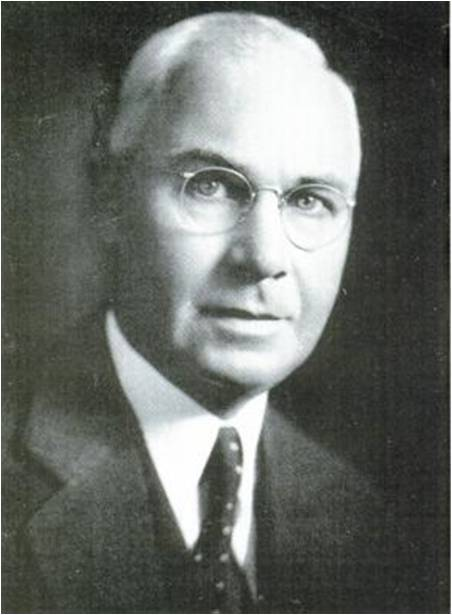
- John L. Savage
- Born: December 25, 1879; Cooksville, Wisconsin
- Died: December 28, 1967 (aged 88); Englewood, Colorado
- Occupation: Civil engineer
- Spouse(s): Jessie Burdick Sexsmith, Olga Lacher Miner
- Awards: John Fritz Medal (1945); Washington Award (1949)

John Lucian Savage (December 25, 1879 – December 28, 1967) was an American civil engineer. Among the 60 major dams he supervised the designs for, he is best known for Hoover Dam, Shasta Dam, Parker Dam and Grand Coulee Dam in the United States along with surveying for the future Three Gorges Dam in China. He was a member of the National Academy of Sciences and the recipient of numerous awards including the John Fritz Medal.

== Biography ==
=== Early life ===
John L. Savage was born on December 25, 1879, in Cooksville, Wisconsin, to Edwin Parker and Mary Therese (Stebbins) Savage. Raised on a farm, Savage was involved in numerous chores and labor while attending grade school. Interestingly, the Savage House was not far from the historic sawmill that village founder John Cook built in 1842 on the Badfish Creek outside of Cooksville. His mother's father also built a nearby watermill. Savage later attended the Hillside Home School near Spring Green, Wisconsin (designed by Frank Lloyd Wright in 1887) after he earned tuition and board for two years. Savage graduated from Madison High School, then attended the University of Wisconsin. During the summer of his freshmen year he helped work on the Geological Survey of Wisconsin. During the summers of his sophomore and junior years, he conducted surveying with the United States Geological Survey. Savage graduated from the University of Wisconsin in 1903 with a B.S. in Civil Engineering.

=== Professional life ===
==== U.S. Bureau of Reclamation, Idaho Division ====
In 1903, Savage took an engineering aid job with the United States Bureau of Reclamation, Idaho Division. Before leaving that position in 1908, Savage worked on his first dam, the Minidoka Project. In Idaho, Savage also worked on the Payette-Boise Canal System, the Boise River Diversion Dam and the Upper and Lower Deer Flat Dams.

==== A. J. Wiley Engineering Association ====
In 1908, after leaving the U.S. Bureau of Reclamation Idaho Division, Savage began an eight-year association with A. J. Wiley, an engineer in Boise, Idaho. Their engineering practice boomed because of increased water use by the private sector for agriculture. Savage spent the majority of his time in the association inspecting and consulting on projects. During his time with Wiley, Savage worked on the Salmon River Dam, the Swan Falls Power Plant on the Snake River, the Barber Dam on the Boise River, the Twin Falls North Side Canal System, and the American Falls Power Plant. Savage also designed the gates for the Arrowrock Dam on the Boise River.

==== U.S. Bureau of Reclamation, Chief Engineer Office ====
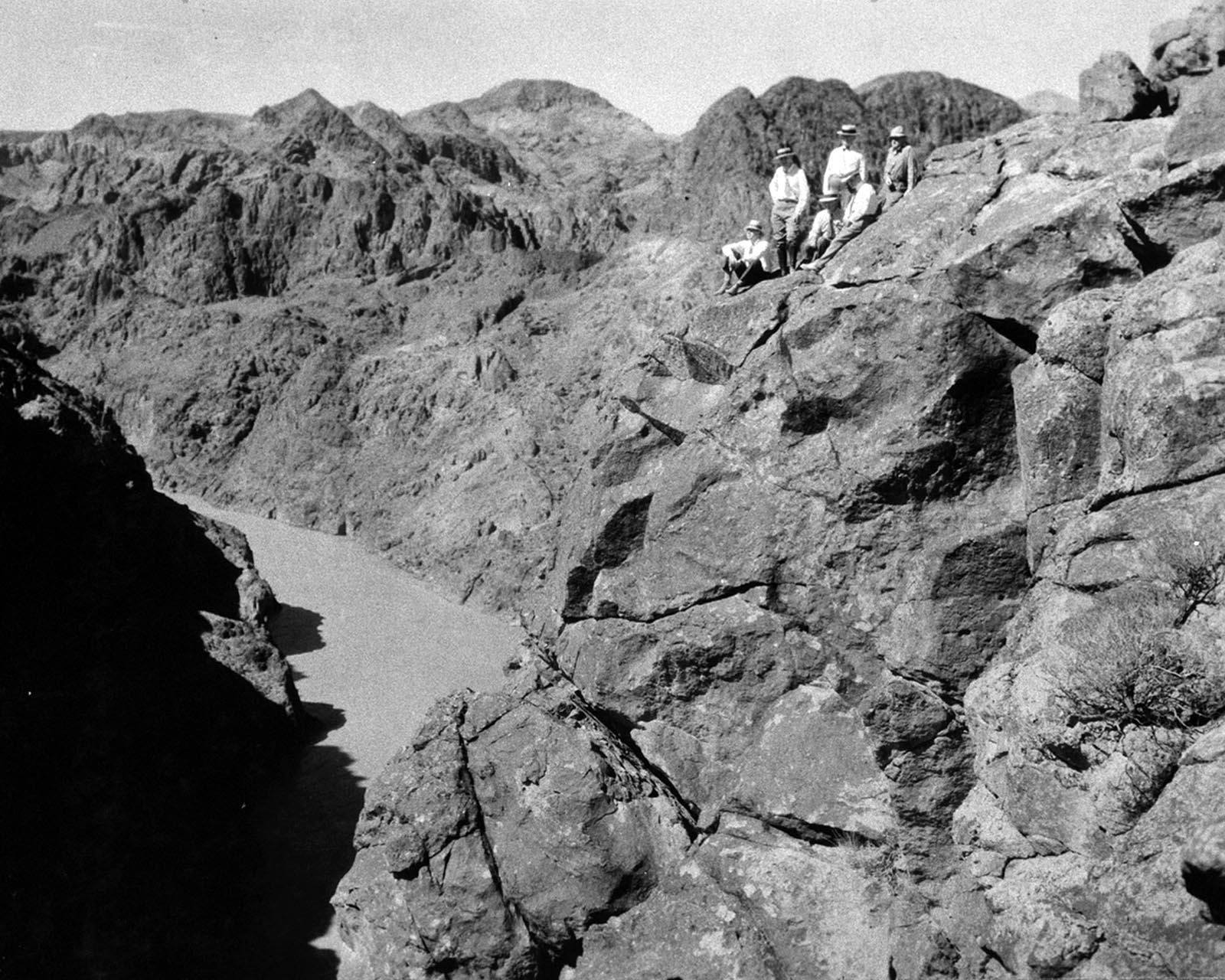
Savage and other engineers observing the Black Canyon; future Hoover Dam site.

After working with A.J. Wiley and buying a cattle ranch in Idaho, Savage returned to the U.S. Bureau of Reclamation in the office of the Chief Engineer. There he became the first designing engineer of the Bureau and later, between 1924 and 1945, served as the chief designing engineer in charge of all civil, electrical, and mechanical design. While in this position, Savage's supervisor, the Chief Engineer, allowed him to work in an independent capacity because of his abilities. With this, Savage was responsible for the designing of large projects, such as Hoover Dam, Parker Dam, Shasta Dam, the All-American Canal, and Grand Coulee Dam.

==== Official overseas consulting ====
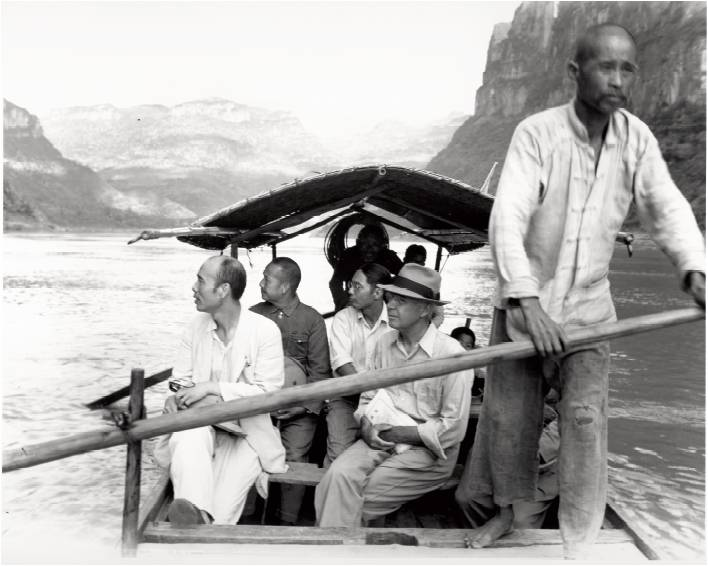
Savage and Chinese Delegation, on Yangtze River, 1944

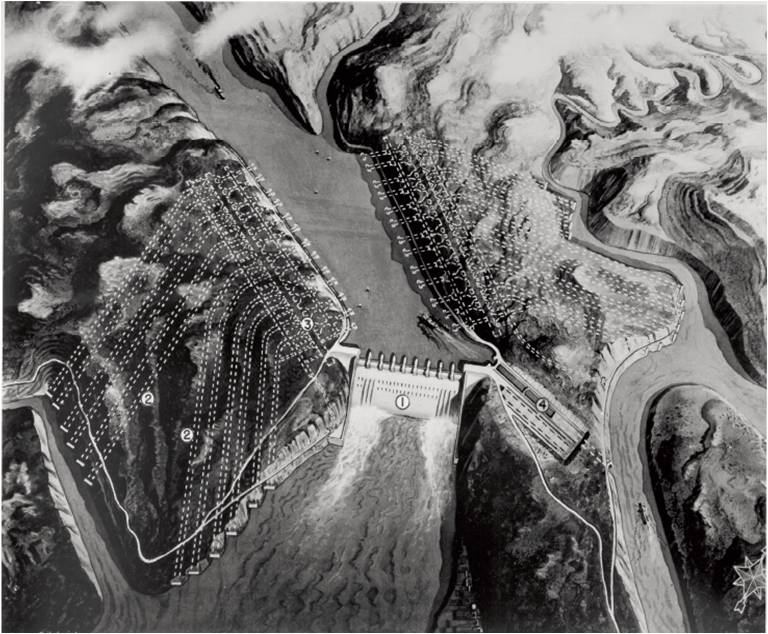
Savage's Proposal for the Yangtze River Gorge Dam, 1945

While with the U.S. Bureau of Reclamation, Savage became a renowned expert on dams and civil engineering; he consulted in 19 countries on hundreds of projects. In 1938, the Government of New South Wales asked Savage to consult on the Burrinjuck Dam in Australia after fears that the dam wall was unstable. Initially, Savage was not allowed to go because of a U.S. law forbidding federal employees from accepting money from foreign powers. Savage refused any payments and offered his services anyway, writing his superiors: "Any assistance will be gratis and I shall not accept any reimbursement for expenses. An overdue vacation will be sufficient gratuity."

After serving Mexico, in 1941, the United States Congress unanimously passed legislation allowing Savage to officially consult in India, Australia, and other countries. In Australia, Savage was consulted during the construction of the Upper Yarra and Warragamba Dams. Savage consulted on several dams in Afghanistan for the purpose of irrigation. In Switzerland, he consulted on the design and construction of the Grande Dixence Dam. He also consulted on numerous projects in India, Palestine and Spain.

In 1944, the Chairman of the Nationalist Government of China, Chiang Kai-shek invited Savage to China, where he surveyed and designed his "dream dam". At the time, the project was known as the Yangtze Gorge Project and would help irrigate 10 million acres (40,000 km^{2}) of land and control the Yangtze River, which was prone to deadly floods. When Savage returned, he published his report titled "Yangtze Gorge and Tributary Project" in which he stated in the preface: "The Yangtze Gorge Project is a 'CLASSIC'." He also stated that it would bring employment and a higher standard of living in China. On June 3, 1946, the first of the dams he suggested, the Upper Tsing Yuan Tung, began but was halted on August 15, 1947, because of the Chinese Civil War. His dream, would be a reality almost 60 years later; standing as the Three Gorges Dam, one of the largest dams and supplying the largest power plant in the world.

=== Retirement ===
John L. Savage retired from the U.S. Bureau of Reclamation in 1945 but continued to consult in countries such as Afghanistan, South Africa, India, Singapore, Formosa, Japan, Mexico, Canada and Australia.

==== Legacy ====
John L. Savage was known as an exemplary and diligent worker among his peers, often seeing engineering problems before they arose. Savage's peers often referred to him as the first "billion dollar" American engineer because of the costs of the projects he designed and supervised. He was also known by some as "Jack Dam" Savage. Savage never saw money as an object of his work and once said that he took pleasure in joining "enterprises that have as their objective the development of human relations."

During Savage's 1945 John Fritz Medal award ceremony, the following was said: "Among Savage's major satisfactions is that of having seen the West grow and thrive as a result of the Bureau of Reclamation program for power and irrigation. Nearly 5,000,000 people—one out of every five living in the seventeen Western states—are dependent in one way or another on the facilities designed under his supervision."

== Personal life ==
John L. Savage was married twice and never fathered any children. Savage first married Jessie Burdick Sexsmith on June 1, 1918, but she died on July 17, 1940. Savage's second marriage was to Olga Lacher Miner on January 14, 1950. Although childless, Savage helped fund several of his nieces and nephews through college. In addition, he brought home an orphaned child from his trip to China.

John L. Savage died on December 28, 1967, in Englewood, Colorado.

== Contributions to civil engineering ==
When designing the Hoover Dam, Savage introduced artificially cooled mass concrete, which dramatically reduced the setting time of concrete, allowing for faster construction. He also introduced the trial load method of arch analysis, which removed theorized and actual stresses in a finished structure. While designing the Grand Coulee Dam, Savage and his assistants solved an engineering problem of "twists" by leaving 6-foot (1.8 m) gaps in a dam structure called "twist adjustment slots" in order to provide "give" as hydrostatic pressure amounted on a concrete dam, preventing cracking.

Savage and his associates developed methods and equipment that determined the stress on penstocks — pipes responsible for directly transferring water to generators in hydroelectricity power plants. They also studied the behavior of concrete and rolled-earth dams as well as the seismic and land subsidence effects caused by the weight of large reservoirs.

== Awards ==
=== Education ===
- Bachelor of Science, Civil Engineering, University of Wisconsin, 1903

==== Honorary degrees ====
- D.Sc., University of Wisconsin, 1934
- D.Sc., University of Denver, 1946
- D.Eng., University of Colorado, 1947

=== Professional ===
- Colorado Engineering Council's Gold Medal Award, 1937
- Gold Medal Award of the National Resources Commission of China, 1944
- John Fritz Medal, 1945
- Henry C. Turner Gold Medal Award, 1946
- Chi Epsilon, 12th National Honor Member, 1946
- National Academy of Sciences Election, 1949
- Washington Award, 1949
- U.S. Department of Interior Gold Medal Award, 1950
- Reclamation Hall of Fame, May 1950
- Popular Mechanics Hall of Fame, 1952
- "Order of Ching Hsin" (China), 1952
