= George W. Hull =

American politician

Member of the Wisconsin Senate from the 22nd district
- In office 1925–1928
- Preceded by: Eldo T. Ridgway
- Succeeded by: Conrad Shearer

Personal details
- Born: George Woodruff Hull; June 6, 1870 Johnstown, Wisconsin, U.S.
- Died: April 6, 1951 (aged 80) Janesville, Wisconsin, U.S.
- Party: Republican

George Woodruff Hull (June 6, 1870 – April 6, 1951) was an American farmer and politician.

Born in the town of Johnstown, Rock County, Wisconsin, Hull went to public school. He then went to Lawrence University. He was born and raised on a farm. Hull was president of the Wisconsin Farm Bureau Federation and the Wisconsin Foreign Cheese Federation. Hull served as town board chairman. He also served on the Rock County, Wisconsin Board of Supervisors and was chairman of the county board. In 1923, Hull moved to Whitewater, Wisconsin. He served in the Wisconsin State Senate and was a Republican. Hull died in Janesville, Wisconsin as a result of a fall.
