= Harrison Stebbins =

American politician (1820–1882)

Harrison Stebbins (June 8, 1820 – September 5, 1882) was an American farmer, teacher, and politician.

Born in Westfield, Orleans County, Vermont, Stebbins went to the public schools and helped his family on the farm. He then went to Norwich University in Norwich, Vermont and taught school. In 1841, Stebbins and his wife Mary moved to Janesville, Rock County, Wisconsin Territory. He served as county surveyor. In 1844, Stebbins and his wife moved to the town of Porter, Rock County, Wisconsin Territory and settled on a farm, which was later put on the National Register of Historic Places. The house was demolished in 2013.

In 1867, Stebbins built a grist mill at the community of Stebbinsville, Wisconsin; the community was named in his honor. Stebbins served as Porter Town Clerk and as Chairman of the Porter Town Board. In 1853, Stebbins served in the Wisconsin State Assembly and was involved with the Republican and Whig Parties. During the American Civil War, Stebbins helped with recruiting in the town of Porter.

He had a son, Shapley Stebbins, who took over the farm, and two daughters, Mary Stebbins Savage and Flora Gilley. Mary "was a prominent figure in Cooksville and Stebbinsville literary circles, sharing her Steinway piano and poetic accomplishments." She also acted in local theater productions. Stebbins died at his home in Porter, Wisconsin.
