= Hellen M. Brooks =

American politician (1862–1931)

Member of the Wisconsin State Assembly
- In office 1925

Personal details
- Born: Hellen Merrifield; April 18, 1862 Fulton, Wisconsin, U.S.
- Died: April 14, 1931 (aged 68)
- Party: Republican
- Spouse(s): Louis S. Brooks (died) Edward F. Shay (m. 1926)
- Education: Milton College
- Occupation: Politician, educator
- Known for: Being one of the first three female state legislators in Wisconsin

Hellen Merrifield Brooks (April 18, 1862 – April 14, 1931) was an American educator and politician. With Mildred Barber and Helen Thompson, she was one of the first three female state legislators in Wisconsin.

Born Hellen Merrifield in the town of Fulton, Wisconsin in Rock County, Wisconsin, Brooks went to Milton College and received her degree in education from Milwaukee Normal School in education. She taught in several schools and was a principal. She lived in Coloma, Wisconsin. Brooks was involved in the Red Cross and Liberty Loan committees during World War II. She served on the school board. Brooks served in the Wisconsin State Assembly in 1925 and was a Republican. When elected, she was the widow of Louis S. Brooks. In 1926, she married Edward F. Shay and her political career ended.
