= Charles D. Rosa =

American politician (1870–1959)

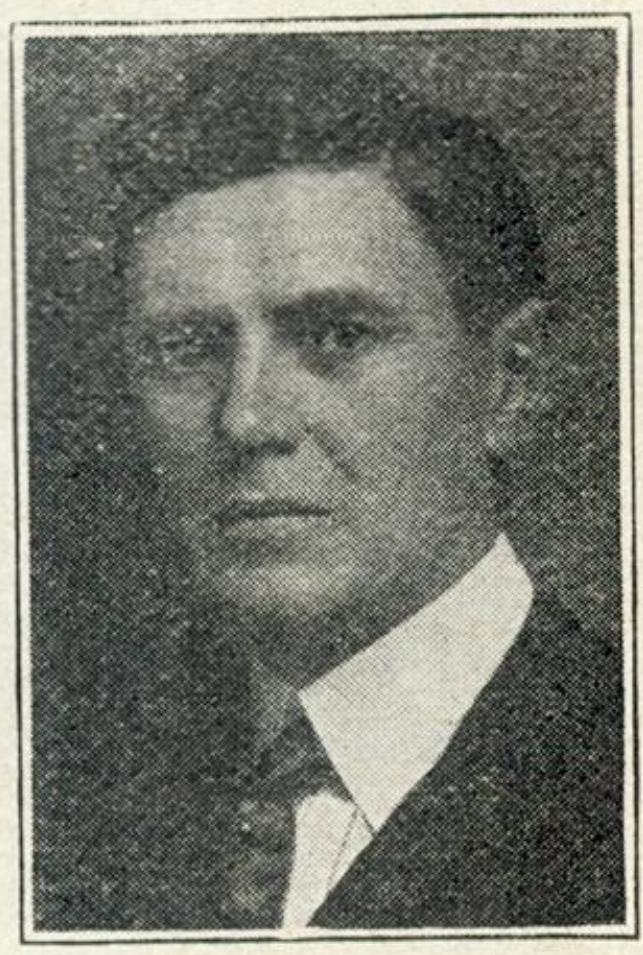

Member of the Wisconsin State Assembly from the Rock 2nd district
- In office January 1, 1917 – January 6, 1919
- Preceded by: Albert J. Winegar
- Succeeded by: Alonzo J. Mathison
- In office January 6, 1913 – January 4, 1915
- Preceded by: Grant U. Fisher
- Succeeded by: Albert J. Winegar

Personal details
- Born: September 15, 1870 Center, Wisconsin
- Died: August 3, 1959 (aged 88) Madison, Wisconsin, U.S.
- Party: Republican
- Occupation: Farmer, lawyer

Charles D. Rosa (September 15, 1870 – August 3, 1959) was an American jurist and politician.

Born in the town of Center, Rock County, Wisconsin, Rosa worked on a farm and on the railroad. He went to Evansville Seminary and Beloit Academy. He then graduated from Beloit College. Rosa served as principal of the Edgerton, Wisconsin public schools. Rosa graduated from University of Wisconsin Law School and practiced law in Beloit, Wisconsin; Rosa also taught commercial law at Beloit College. In 1906, Rosa was elected Beloit Municipal Court judge. He also was a farmer and livestock breeder. In 1913 and 1917, Rosa served in the Wisconsin State Assembly and was a Republican. Later, Rosa served as chairman of the Wisconsin Tax Commission. Following the death of Chief Justice in 1922 Robert G. Siebecker, Rosa was mentioned as a possible appointee.

Rosa died in Madison, Wisconsin.
