= David F. Sayre =

American politician

David Franklin Sayre (January 14, 1822 – May 3, 1919) was an American pioneer, lawyer, state legislator, and farmer.

Born in Madison, New Jersey, Sayre graduated from the City University of New York and then studied law in Patterson, New York. He moved to Fulton, Wisconsin Territory in 1840 and then settled on a farm in Porter, Wisconsin. Sayre was a farmer, practiced law, and was a real estate agent for a southern corporation in Wisconsin. Sayre served in many town and county offices. In 1873, Sayre served in the Wisconsin State Assembly as a Republican although later in life, Sayre was an Independent. Sayre died at the home of his son in Porter, Wisconsin.
