= Johnstown, Rock County, Wisconsin =

Town of Johnstown
- Town
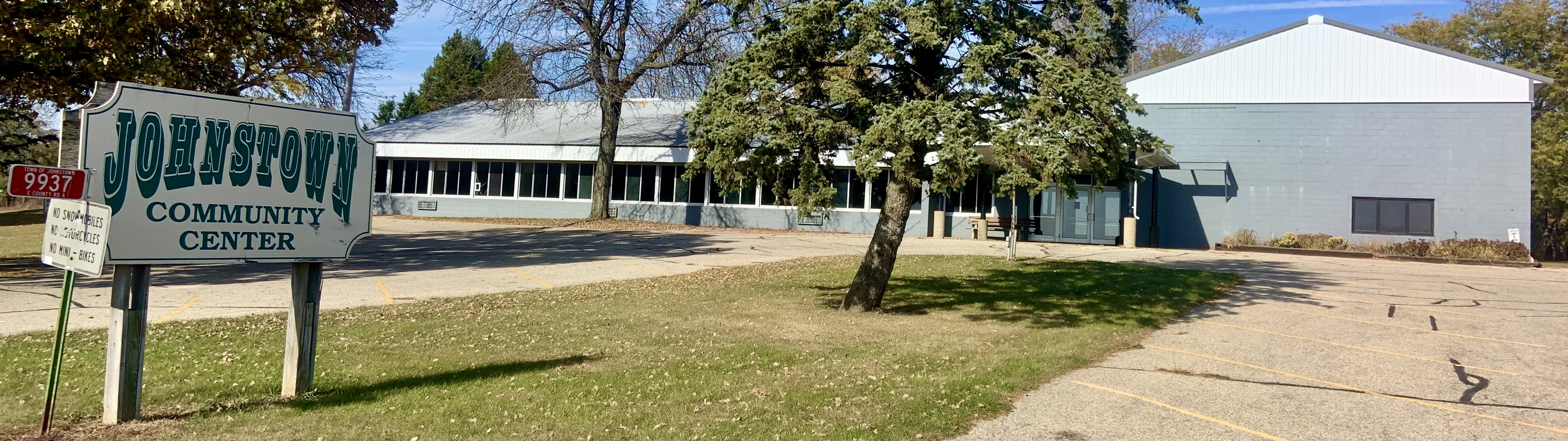
- Town hall west of Johnstown Center

- Location of the Town of Johnstown in Rock County and the state of Wisconsin.
- Coordinates: 42°43′2″N 88°50′3″W
- Country: United States
- State: Wisconsin
- County: Rock

Area
  - Total: 36.2 sq mi (93.8 km^{2})
  - Land: 36.2 sq mi (93.8 km^{2})
  - Water: 0 sq mi (0.0 km^{2})
- Elevation: 1,030 ft (314 m)

Population (2020)
  - Total: 766
  - Density: 22/sq mi (8.6/km^{2})
- Time zone: UTC-6 (Central (CST))
  - Summer (DST): UTC-5 (CDT)
- Area code: 608
- FIPS code: 55-38450
- GNIS feature ID: 1583458
- Website: https://johnstownrockcowi.gov/

The Town of Johnstown is a town located in Rock County, Wisconsin, United States. The unincorporated community of Johnstown Center is located in the town.

== Geography ==
According to the United States Census Bureau, the town has a total area of 36.2 square miles (93.8 km^{2}), all land.

== Demographics ==
As of the census of 2000, there were 802 people, 289 households, and 232 families residing in the town. The population density was 22.2 people per square mile (8.6/km^{2}). There were 306 housing units at an average density of 8.5 per square mile (3.3/km^{2}). The racial makeup of the town was 99.25% White, 0.62% Native American, and 0.12% from two or more races.

There were 289 households, out of which 32.5% had children under the age of 18 living with them, 69.6% were married couples living together, 5.5% had a female householder with no husband present, and 19.4% were non-families. 14.2% of all households were made up of individuals, and 4.5% had someone living alone who was 65 years of age or older. The average household size was 2.78 and the average family size was 3.06.

In the town, the population was spread out, with 27.6% under the age of 18, 5.0% from 18 to 24, 28.3% from 25 to 44, 27.1% from 45 to 64, and 12.1% who were 65 years of age or older. The median age was 40 years. For every 100 females, there were 106.7 males. For every 100 females age 18 and over, there were 115.2 males.

The median income for a household in the town was $55,313, and the median income for a family was $61,667. Males had a median income of $35,313 versus $25,982 for females. The per capita income for the town was $22,452. About 2.6% of families and 4.9% of the population were below the poverty line, including 5.1% of those under age 18 and none of those age 65 or over.

== Notable people ==
- George W. Hull, Wisconsin state senator, was born in the town
- A. Warren Phelps, politician, lived in Johnstown
- Ella Wheeler Wilcox, poet and mystic; was born in Johnstown
