= Wisconsin Highway 186 =

State highway in Wisconsin, United States

State Trunk Highway 186
- WIS 186 highlighted in red

Route information
- Maintained by WisDOT
- Length: 15.01 mi (24.16 km)

Major junctions
- South end: WIS 73 in Vesper
- North end: US 10 / WIS 13 in Auburndale

Location
- Country: United States
- State: Wisconsin
- Counties: Wood

Highway system
- Wisconsin State Trunk Highway System; Interstate; US; State; Scenic; Rustic
← WIS 185	→ WIS 187

State Trunk Highway 186 (often called Highway 186, STH-186 or WIS 186) is a 15.01-mile (24.16 km) state highway in the U.S. state of Wisconsin. It runs from its southern terminus at WIS 73 south of Vesper to US Highway 10 (US 10) and WIS 13 in Auburndale. The highway is located entirely within Wood County. Like all Wisconsin state highways, WIS 186 is maintained by the Wisconsin Department of Transportation (WisDOT).

== Route description ==
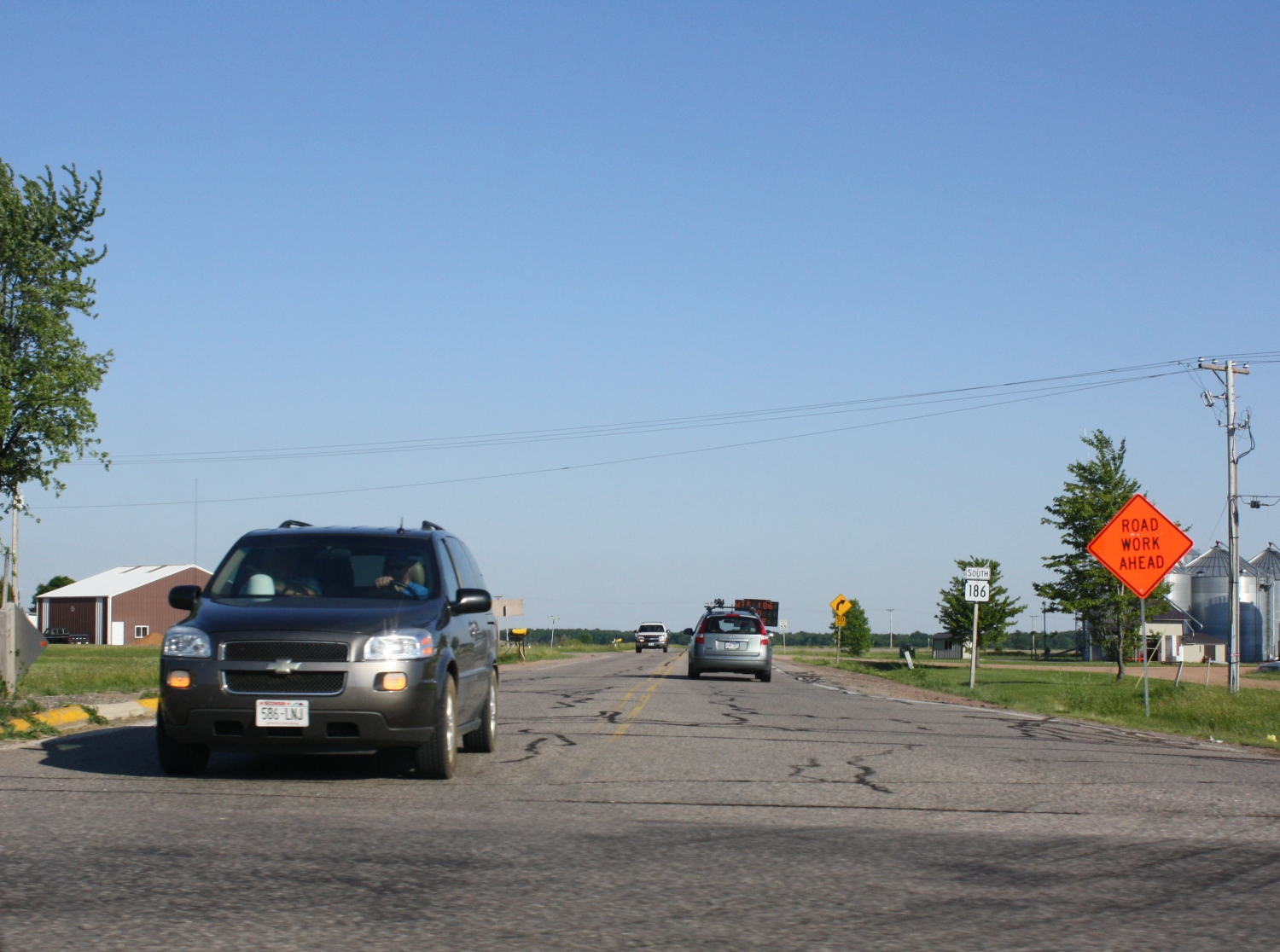
Looking south from northern terminus

WIS 186 begins south of Vesper at a four-way intersection with WIS 73. South of the intersection, the road continues as County Trunk Highway D (CTH-D). WIS 186 heads north toward Vesper and enters the village from the south as Wisconsin Street. It turns northwest in the middle of the village and leaves it as Cameron Avenue. Outside of Vesper, WIS 186 turns north again before curving west towards Arpin. The highway continues west until it is south of Arpin, at which point it turns north and passes through the village. It continues north until it terminates at an intersection with US 10 and WIS 13 just before Auburndale.

== History ==
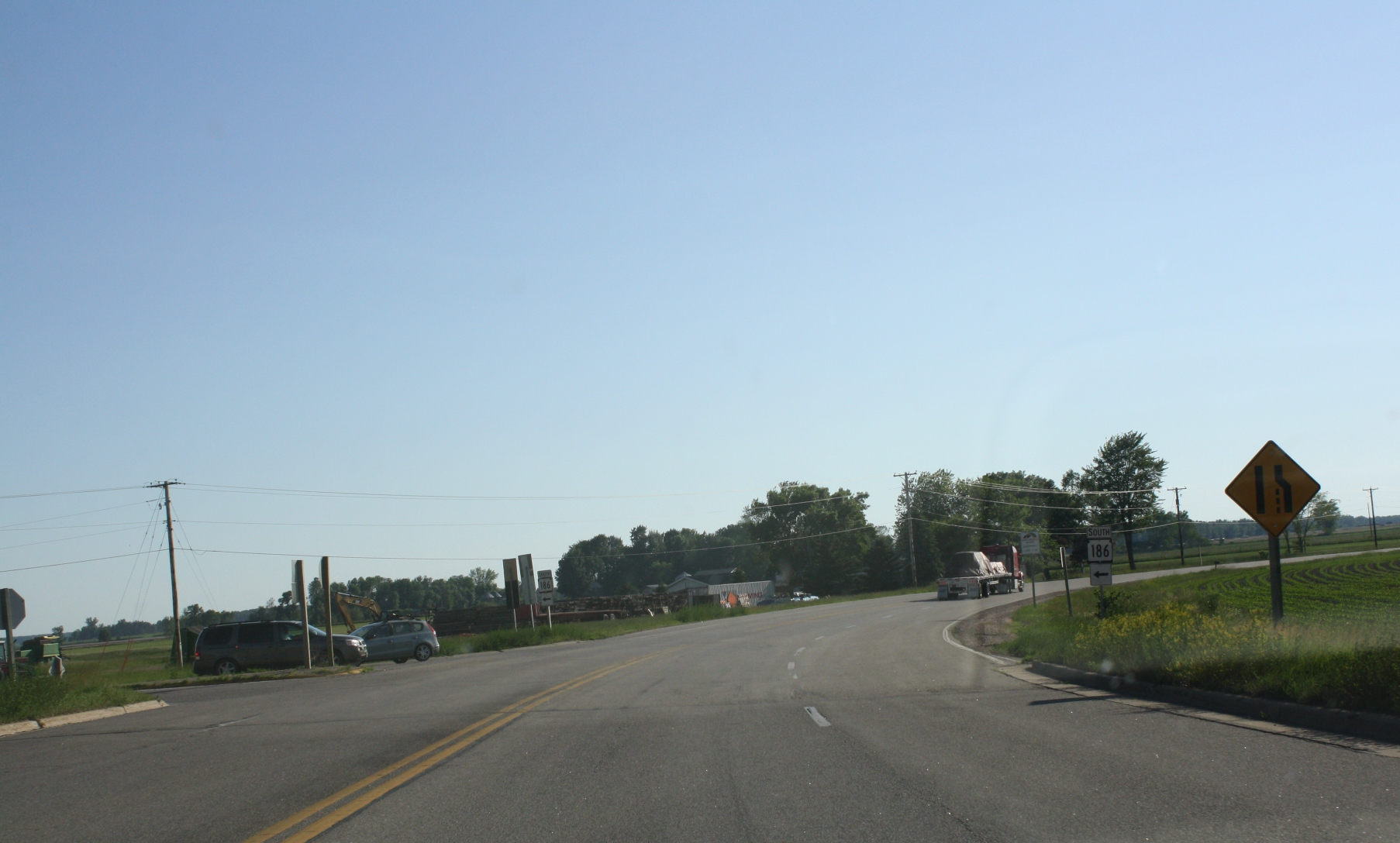
Northern terminus

WisDOT designated WIS 186 in 1947 along the former CTH-M. WIS 186 has not changed its routing since its establishment. Three bridges on the highway were rebuilt in 2003; one was 1.25 miles (2.01 km) south of US 10, and the other two were within Arpin and Vesper. The bridges were the focus of a $1.15 million WisDOT project. Later in 2003, a lumber truck crashed into another vehicle at the intersection of WIS 186 and WIS 13; the truck's logs spilled onto the highway, and both roads were closed for several hours to clean up the lumber.

== Major intersections ==
The entire route is in Wood County.

Location	mi	km	Destinations	Notes
Town of Hansen	0.00	0.00	WIS 73 – Wisconsin Rapids, Marshfield, Neillsville; CTH-D	
Auburndale	15.01	24.16	US 10 / WIS 13 – Marshfield, Stevens Point	
1.000 mi = 1.609 km; 1.000 km = 0.621 mi
