= Porter, Wisconsin =

Town of Porter, Wisconsin
- Town
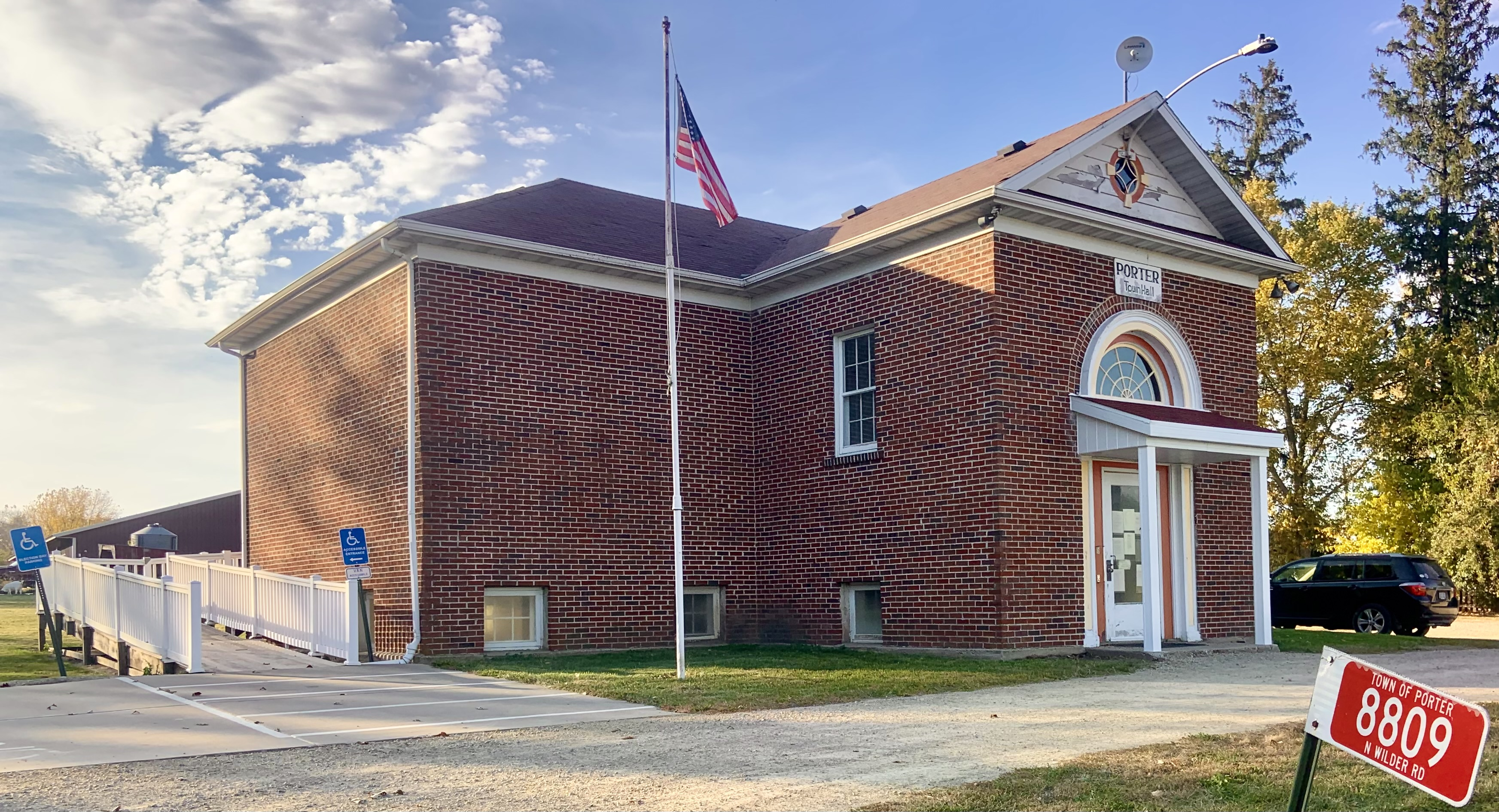
- Town hall

- Location in Rock County and the state of Wisconsin.
- Coordinates: 42°48′46″N 89°11′50″W
- Country: United States
- State: Wisconsin
- County: Rock

Area
  - Total: 36.4 sq mi (94.3 km^{2})
  - Land: 36.1 sq mi (93.4 km^{2})
  - Water: 0.39 sq mi (1.0 km^{2})
- Elevation: 866 ft (264 m)

Population (2020)
  - Total: 969
  - Density: 26.9/sq mi (10.4/km^{2})
- Time zone: UTC-6 (Central (CST))
  - Summer (DST): UTC-5 (CDT)
- Area code: 608
- FIPS code: 55-64225
- GNIS feature ID: 1583956
- Website: http://porterwi.com

The Town of Porter is a located in Rock County, Wisconsin, United States. The population was 969 at the 2020 census. The unincorporated communities of Cooksville and Stebbinsville are located in the town.

== Geography ==
According to the United States Census Bureau, the town has a total area of 36.4 square miles (94.4 km^{2}), of which 36.1 square miles (93.4 km^{2}) is land and 0.4 square mile (1.0 km^{2}) (1.02%) is water.

== Demographics ==
As of the census of 2000, there were 925 people, 340 households, and 256 families residing in the town. The population density was 25.7 people per square mile (9.9/km^{2}). There were 365 housing units at an average density of 10.1 per square mile (3.9/km^{2}). The racial makeup of the town was 98.92% White, 0.11% African American, 0.11% Native American, 0.76% from other races, and 0.11% from two or more races. Hispanic or Latino of any race were 1.84% of the population.

There were 340 households, out of which 33.8% had children under the age of 18 living with them, 69.1% were married couples living together, 2.4% had a female householder with no husband present, and 24.7% were non-families. 17.4% of all households were made up of individuals, and 8.5% had someone living alone who was 65 years of age or older. The average household size was 2.72 and the average family size was 3.11.

In the town, the population was spread out, with 25.7% under the age of 18, 6.3% from 18 to 24, 28.8% from 25 to 44, 25.3% from 45 to 64, and 13.9% who were 65 years of age or older. The median age was 40 years. For every 100 females, there were 106.9 males. For every 100 females age 18 and over, there were 113.4 males.

The median income for a household in the town was $51,250, and the median income for a family was $55,417. Males had a median income of $35,769 versus $29,531 for females. The per capita income for the town was $22,025. About 4.2% of families and 6.5% of the population were below the poverty line, including 8.5% of those under age 18 and 3.0% of those age 65 or over.

== Notable people ==
- Mary Stebbins Savage, writer, poet
- David F. Sayre, Wisconsin State Representative, farmer, and lawyer, lived on a farm in the town
- Harrison Stebbins, Wisconsin State Representative and farmer, lived on a historic farm in the town; Stebbins served as chairman of the Porter Town Board

== See also ==
- List of towns in Wisconsin
