= Grant U. Fisher =

American politician (1865–1931)

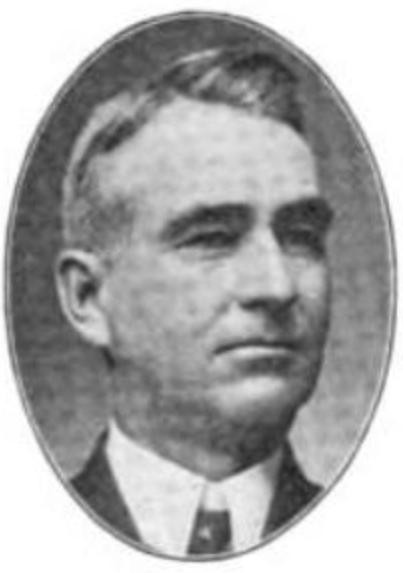

Member of the Wisconsin State Assembly
- In office 1908–1912
- Constituency: Rock County Second District

Personal details
- Born: August 25, 1865 Center, Rock County, Wisconsin, U.S.
- Died: February 19, 1931 (aged 65) Whittier, California, U.S.
- Party: Republican
- Occupation: Politician

Grant U. Fisher (August 25, 1865 – February 19, 1931) was an American politician. He was a member of the Wisconsin State Assembly. He was elected to the Assembly in 1908 and 1910. Additionally, Fisher was assessor and town clerk of Center, Rock County, Wisconsin. He was a Republican.

Fisher was born on August 25, 1865. He died at his son's home in Whittier, California on February 19, 1931, and was buried at Bethel Cemetery in Center.
