= Miller House (Cooksville, Wisconsin) =

Historic house in Wisconsin, United States

- U.S. National Register of Historic Places
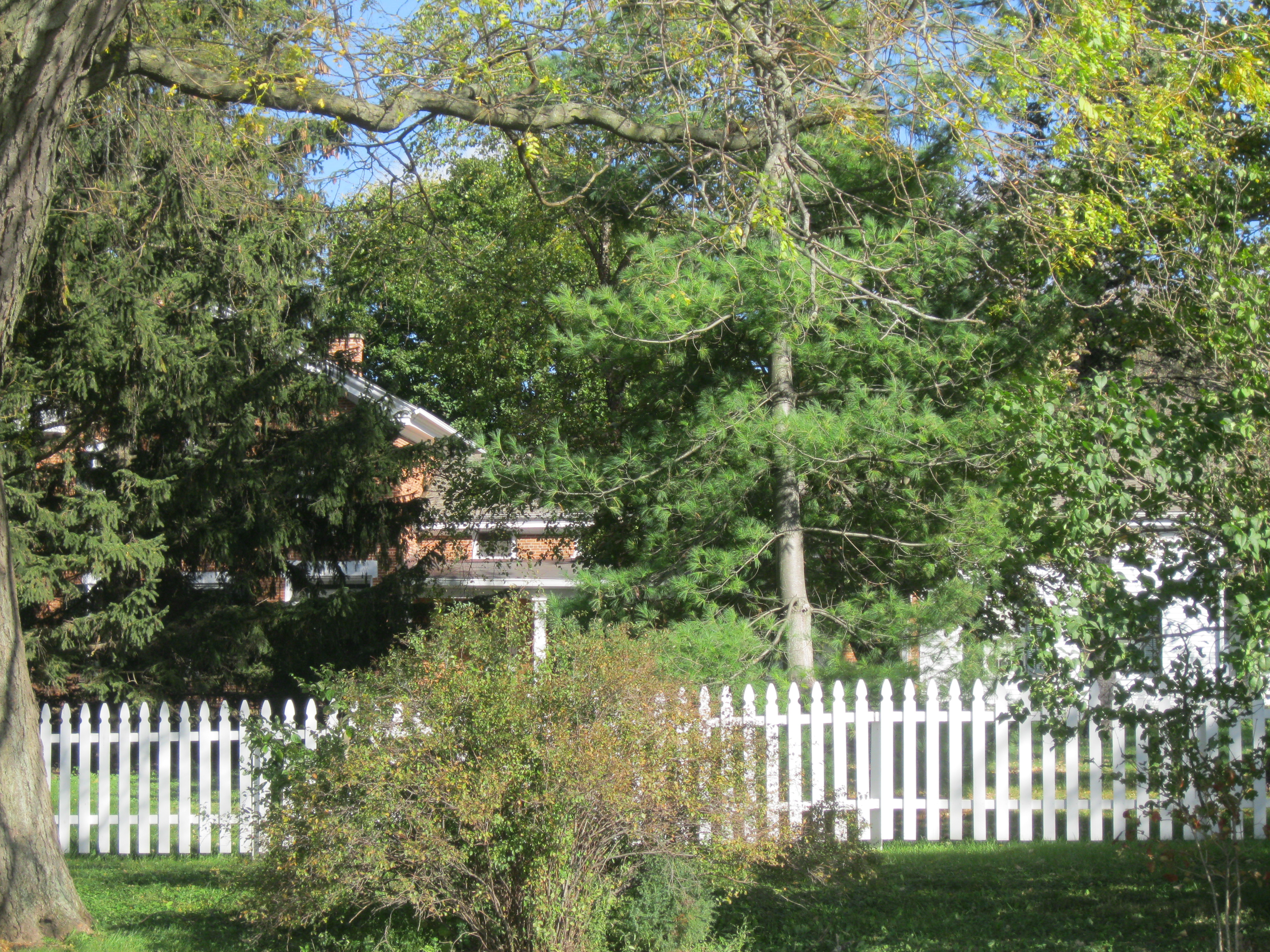
- Miller House
- Location: Cooksville, Wisconsin
- Coordinates: 42°49′40″N 89°14′25″W
- Area: less than one acre
- Built: 1845
- Architect: Chambers & Lovejoy
- Architectural style: Greek Revival
- MPS: Cooksville MRA
- NRHP reference No.: 80000399
- Added to NRHP: September 17, 1980

The Miller House is a brick house built in Greek Revival style about 1845 in Cooksville, Wisconsin. It was listed on the National Register of Historic Places in 1980 and on the State Register of Historic Places in 1989.

The Miller house was probably built by Chambers and Lovejoy, since the floor plan matches that of the Lovejoy-Duncan, Collins and Dow houses. Its walls are of vermilion brick. The cornice is wood. Greek Revival elements include the relatively low-pitched roof, cornice returns, the simple straight lintels above the windows, and the sidelights flanking the door. An elliptical fanlight lights the attic.

James Pratt Miller bought the house from Lovejoy in 1865. Unrelated Charles Miller, a farmer from Pennsylvania, bought the house in 1867 and his family lived there until 1947.
