= Indianford, Wisconsin =

- Unincorporated community
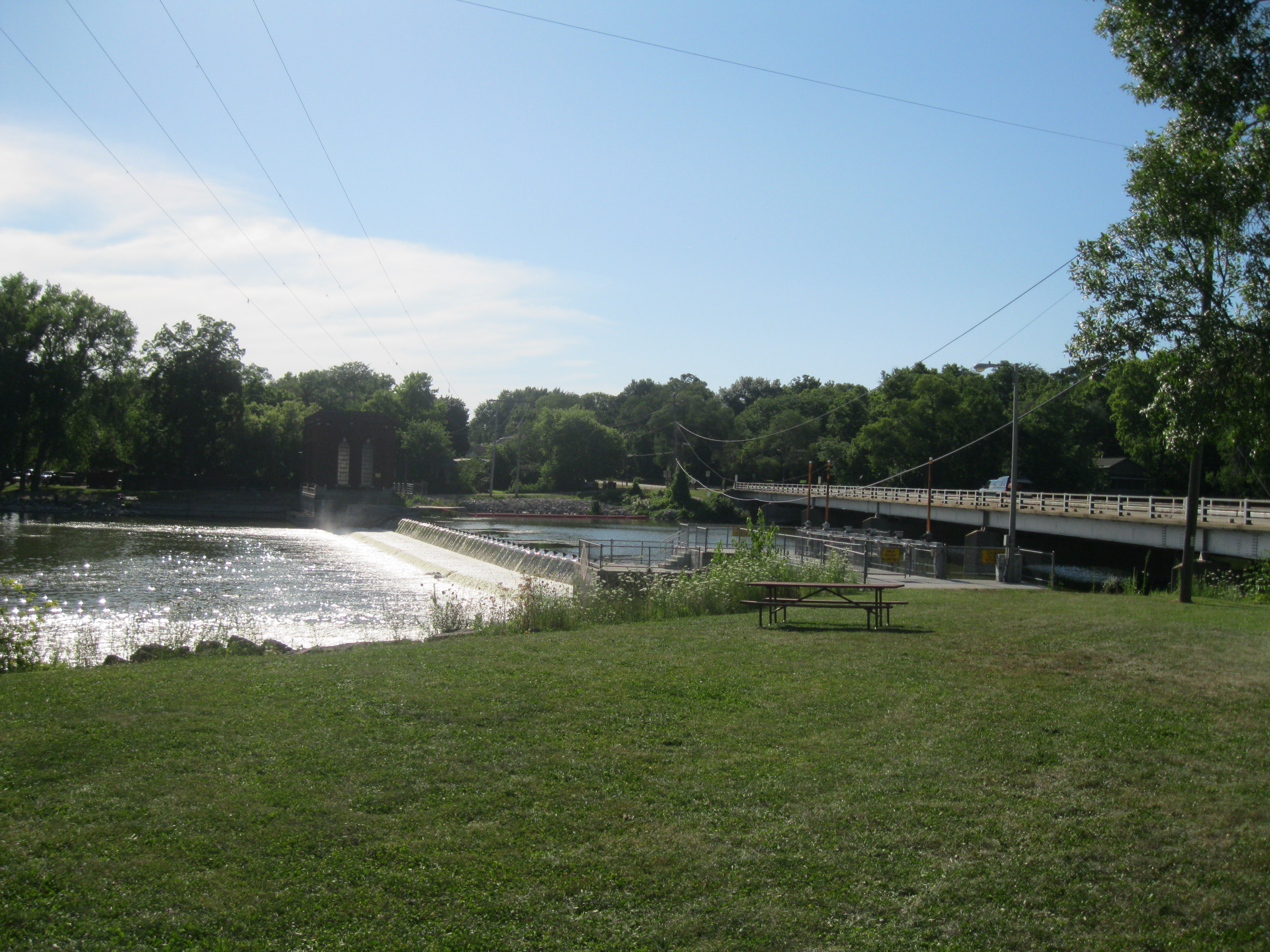
- The Rock River at Indianford

- Location within Wisconsin Location within the United States
- Coordinates: 42°48′15″N 89°05′28″W
- Country: United States
- State: Wisconsin
- County: Rock
- Elevation: 807 ft (246 m)
- Time zone: UTC-6 (Central (CST))
  - Summer (DST): UTC-5 (CDT)
- Area code: 608
- GNIS feature ID: 1581155

Indianford (also Fosters Ferry, Fulton Center, Indian Ford, or Morses Landing) is an unincorporated community located in the town of Fulton, in Rock County, Wisconsin, United States, on the Rock River. The Rock River is dammed at Indianford.

== History ==
The area of the modern-day community of Indianford was first established in 1837 just east of the town of Fulton, Wisconsin. The settlement was named Indian Ford or Indianford due to the rivers historical use as a ford across the Rock River by a local hamlet of Meskwaki or Sauk people near Lake Koshkonong. The first recorded settler of Indianford was William B. Foster who operated a ford and ferry on the Rock River, hence the settlement near the ferry was often referred to as Foster's Ferry. The landing was purchased a year later in 1838 by Lyman Morse who operated the ferry and nicknamed it Morse's Landing. The first bridge across the Rock River was not built until 1845 in order to build a dam. The village's formal name according to historian William Fiske Brown was known as Fulton Center due to its close association and proximity to the city of Fulton, Wisconsin.
