= Johnstown Center, Wisconsin =

- Unincorporated community
- Location within Wisconsin Location within the United States
- Coordinates: 42°41′45″N 88°50′22″W
- Country: United States
- State: Wisconsin
- County: Rock
- Elevation: 935 ft (285 m)
- Time zone: UTC-6 (Central (CST))
  - Summer (DST): UTC-5 (CDT)
- Area code: 608
- GNIS feature ID: 1567257

Johnstown Center is an unincorporated community located in the town of Johnstown, Rock County, Wisconsin, United States.

In 1854, land was purchased in Johnstown Center by the Rock County Board to establish the Rock County Poor Farm and Alms House. The institution became the Rock County Asylum in 1881.
