= Cainville, Wisconsin =

- Unincorporated community
- Location within Wisconsin Location within the United States
- Coordinates: 42°42′35″N 89°15′07″W
- Country: United States
- State: Wisconsin
- County: Rock
- Elevation: 919 ft (280 m)
- Time zone: UTC-6 (Central (CST))
  - Summer (DST): UTC-5 (CDT)
- Area code: 608
- GNIS feature ID: 1562505

Cainville (also Magnolia or Magnolia Station) is an unincorporated community located in the town of Magnolia, Rock County, Wisconsin, United States. The community was named for Seth J. Cain, an area promoter who donated land for the Chicago and North Western railroad station.
