= Savage House (Wisconsin) =

Historic farmhouse, now demolished

- U.S. National Register of Historic Places
- U.S. Historic district
- Location within Wisconsin Location within the United States
- Location: Near Stoughton, Dane County, Wisconsin, United States
- Coordinates: 42°55′15″N 89°13′45″W
- Built: 1848
- Architectural style: Gothic Revival
- Demolished: 1996
- NRHP reference No.: 80000392
- Added to NRHP: September 17, 1980

Savage House was a historic farmhouse located near Stoughton, Wisconsin, United States, built in 1848. It was situated 0.8 miles north of the historic village of Cooksville but officially listed under Stoughton due to its location just across the county line. The house was an example of Gothic Revival style, featuring a symmetrical design with a transverse gable roof and dormer over the front door, similar to other historic houses in Cooksville.

== History ==
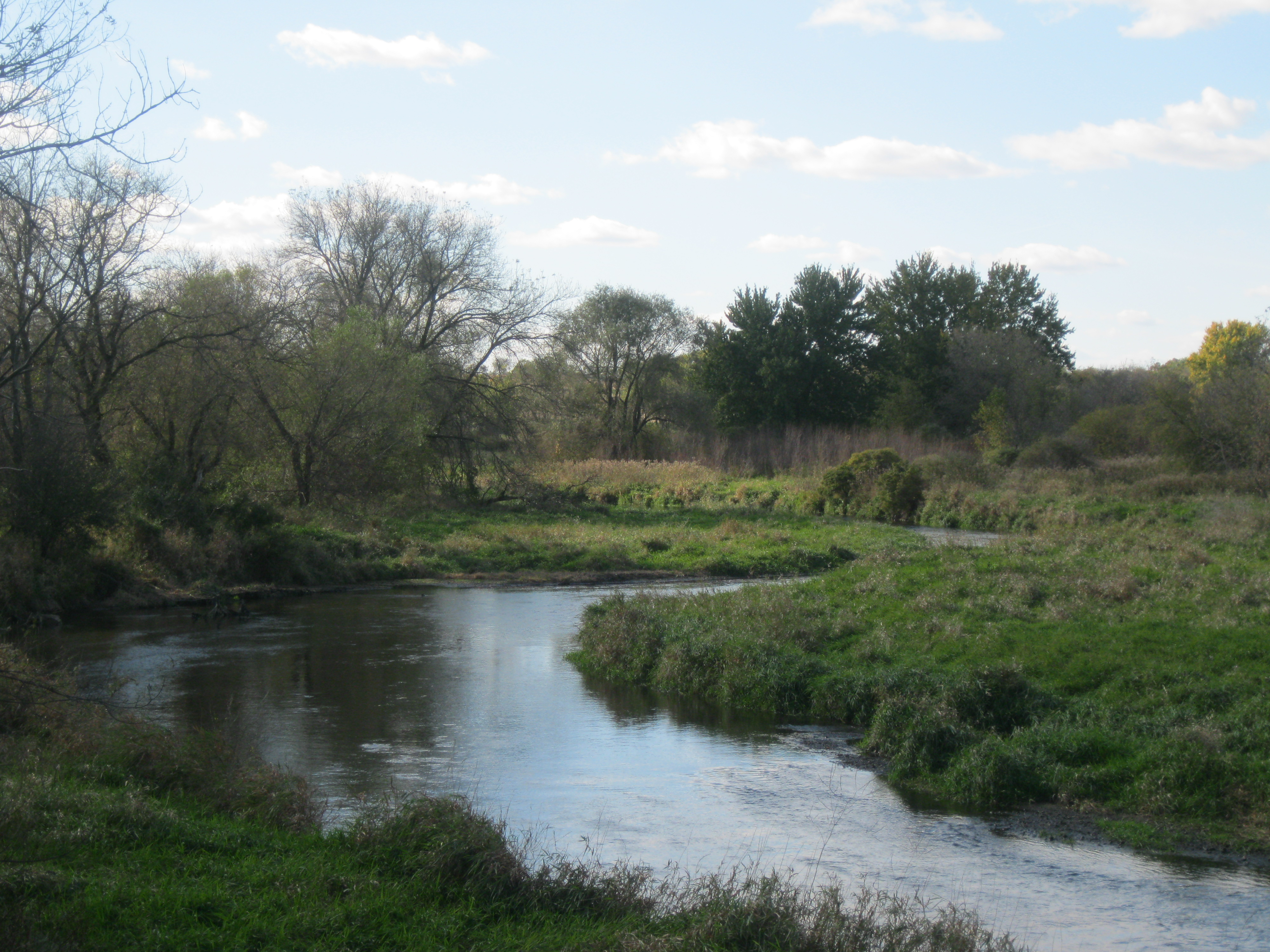
Badfish Creek mill site near Cooksville

The Savage House was originally owned by John Waite Savage, a settler from Vermont. The property was listed on the National Register of Historic Places on September 17, 1980, and on the Wisconsin Register of Historic Places (Ref. #9902) on January 1, 1989. However, by 1980, the house had been abandoned, and it was demolished in 1996. Following its demolition, it was removed from both the State and National Registers.

The most notable resident was John Lucian Savage, who was born in the house in 1879. He later became a renowned civil engineer known for his work on the Hoover Dam, the Grand Coulee Dam, and the Three Gorges Dam.

== Architecture ==
The Savage House was an example of Gothic Revival architecture, featuring a symmetrical layout with a transverse gable roof and dormer-fronted facade. This style was consistent with other historic homes in the nearby village of Cooksville.
