= Magnolia, Wisconsin =

Town of Magnolia, Wisconsin
- Town
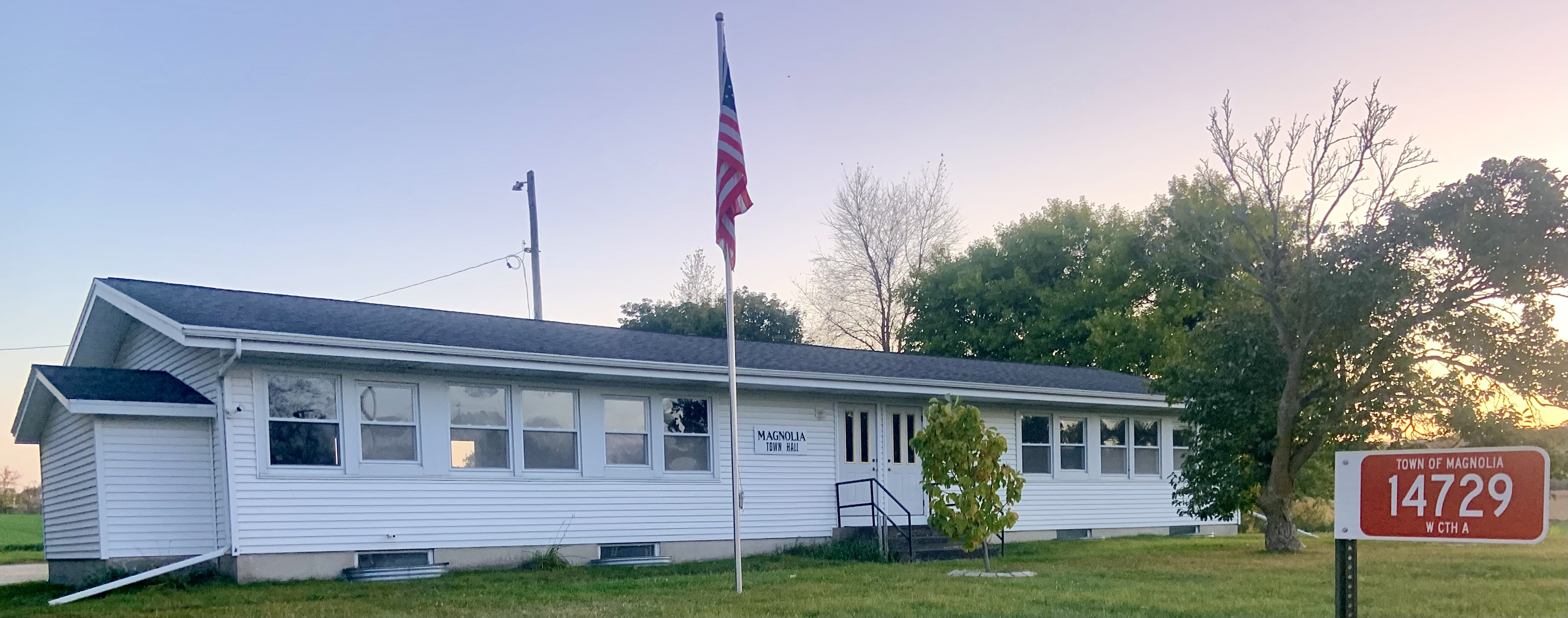
- Town hall

- Location in Rock County and the state of Wisconsin
- Coordinates: 42°42′35″N 89°18′16″W
- Country: United States
- State: Wisconsin
- County: Rock

Area
  - Total: 36.0 sq mi (93.3 km^{2})
  - Land: 36.0 sq mi (93.3 km^{2})
  - Water: 0 sq mi (0 km^{2})
- Elevation: 965 ft (294 m)

Population (2020)
  - Total: 742
  - Density: 20.6/sq mi (7.95/km^{2})
- Time zone: UTC-6 (Central (CST))
  - Summer (DST): UTC-5 (CDT)
- Area code: 608
- FIPS code: 55-48150
- GNIS feature ID: 1583627
- Website: magnoliawi.gov

The Town of Magnolia is located in Rock County, Wisconsin, United States. The population was 742 at the 2020 census. The unincorporated communities of Cainville and Magnolia are located in the town.

== Geography ==
According to the United States Census Bureau, the town has a total area of 36 square miles (93.3 km^{2}), all land.

== Demographics ==
At the 2000 census there were 854 people, 297 households, and 233 families in the town. The population density was 23.7 people per square mile (9.2/km^{2}). There were 308 housing units at an average density of 8.5 per square mile (3.3/km^{2}). The racial makeup of the town was 97.54% White, 0.47% African American, 0.59% Asian, 0.23% from other races, and 1.17% from two or more races. Hispanic or Latino people of any race were 1.87%.

Of the 297 households 41.1% had children under the age of 18 living with them, 65% were married couples living together, 7.4% had a female householder with no husband present, and 21.5% were non-families. 16.8% of households were one person and 5.4% were one person aged 65 or older. The average household size was 2.85 and the average family size was 3.19.

The age distribution was 31% under the age of 18, 9.5% from 18 to 24, 28.8% from 25 to 44, 23.4% from 45 to 64, and 7.3% 65 or older. The median age was 34 years. For every 100 females, there were 100 males. For every 100 females age 18 and over, there were 100.3 males.

The median household income was $45,924 and the median family income was $47,105. Males had a median income of $32,115 versus $25,250 for females. The per capita income for the town was $17,507. About 5.8% of families and 7.1% of the population were below the poverty line, including 10% of those under age 18 and none of those age 65 or over.

== Notable people ==
- Cal Broughton, Major League Baseball catcher; born in Magnolia
