= Gideon Ellis Newman =

American politician

Gideon Ellis Newman (1823–1911) was a member of the Wisconsin State Assembly.

== Biography ==
Newman was born on October 26, 1823, in Dixfield, Maine. On November 19, 1848, he married Elizabeth Wardall. They would have six children.

In 1854, Newman settled in Cooksville, Wisconsin. During the American Civil War, he enlisted with the 35th Wisconsin Volunteer Infantry Regiment of the Union Army. He took part in the Battle of Spanish Fort and achieved the rank of first lieutenant. Newman died on February 7, 1911, and was buried in Cooksville.

== Assembly career ==
Newman was a member of the Assembly during the 1877 session. He was a Republican.
