= Fulton (community), Wisconsin =

Census-designated place in Wisconsin, United States

Fulton, Wisconsin
- Unincorporated community and census-designated place
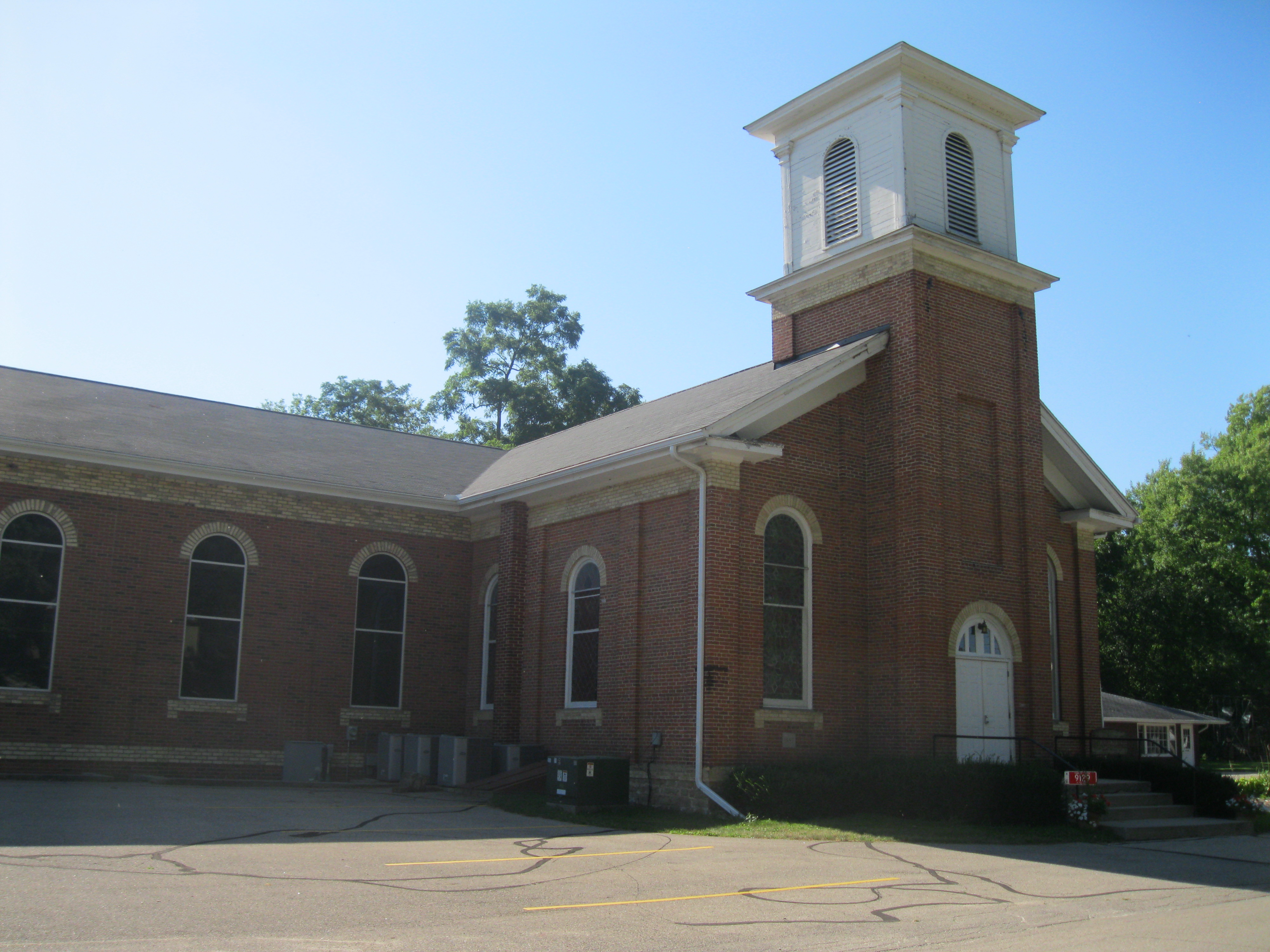
- Fulton Congregational Church

- Location within Wisconsin Location within the United States
- Coordinates: 42°48′29″N 89°07′39″W
- Country: United States
- State: Wisconsin
- County: Rock
- Elevation: 797 ft (243 m)

Population (2020)
  - Total: 117
- Time zone: UTC-6 (Central (CST))
  - Summer (DST): UTC-5 (CDT)
- Area code: 608
- GNIS feature ID: 1565365

Fulton is an unincorporated community and census-designated place located in the town of Fulton, Rock County, Wisconsin, United States. Fulton is located at the junction of County Highways H and M, 3.5 miles (5.6 km) southwest of Edgerton. The Yahara River empties into the Rock River just downstream of Fulton. The community was first named a CDP at the 2020 census, which showed a population of 117.

== Demographics ==
Historical population
Census	Pop.	Note	%±
2020	117		—
U.S. Decennial Census
