= Wisconsin Highway 185 =

Former state highway in Juneau County, Wisconsin, United States

State Trunk Highway 185

Route information
- Maintained by WisDOT
- Length: 3.2 mi (5.1 km)
- Existed: 1958–1991

Major junctions
- South end: CTH-A in Hustler
- North end: US 12 / WIS 16 in Camp Douglas

Location
- Country: United States
- State: Wisconsin
- Counties: Juneau

Highway system
- Wisconsin State Trunk Highway System; Interstate; US; State; Scenic; Rustic
← WIS 184	→ WIS 186
← I-94	WIS 94	→ WIS 95

State Trunk Highway 185 (Highway 185, STH-185 or WIS 185) was a state highway in Juneau County, Wisconsin. It traveled from County Trunk Highway A (CTH-A) in Hustler to US Highway 12/WIS 16 (US 12/WIS 16) in Camp Douglas.

== Route description ==
Starting at CTH-A intersection in Hustler, WIS 185 traveled north towards Camp Douglas. Then, as it reached downtown Camp Douglas, it then crossed a railroad crossing. Further north, it then intersected US 12/WIS 16 just south of Interstate 94 (I-94). At this point, the highway ended here.

== History ==
State Trunk Highway 94
- Location: Hustler–Camp Douglas, Wisconsin
- Length: 3.2 mi (5.1 km)
- Existed: 1919–1957

Back in 1918, the northernmost portion of WIS 33 traveled along what would become WIS 185. WIS 33's Camp Douglas connection was short-lived as it then switched its service to La Crosse by 1920. Then, State Trunk Highway 94 (WIS 94) took over the former WIS 33 alignment north of Union Center. In 1924, WIS 94 was truncated to Elroy in favor of WIS 80's northern extension. In 1933, US 12/US 16 moved northerly to serve Camp Douglas. In 1935, WIS 94 was truncated even further, now running between CTH-AA (now CTH-A) in Hustler and US 12/US 16 (now US 12/WIS 16) in Camp Douglas.

In 1958, WIS 94 was decommissioned due to the introduction of I-94. As a result, WIS 185 took over the now-decommissioned route. During its existence, nothing significant happened to the routing. In 1991, WIS 185 was decommissioned in favor of transferring this route to local control (replaced with CTH-H). The WIS 185 designation has not been used ever since.

== Major intersections ==
The entire highway was in Juneau County.

Location	mi	km	Destinations	Notes
Hustler	0.0	0.0	CTH-A	Southern terminus of WIS 185
Camp Douglas	3.2	5.1	US 12 / WIS 16	Northern terminus of WIS 185
1.000 mi = 1.609 km; 1.000 km = 0.621 mi
