= Fellows, Wisconsin =

- Ghost town
- Location within Wisconsin
- Coordinates: 42°44′53″N 89°12′03″W
- Country: United States
- State: Wisconsin
- County: Rock
- Elevation: 906 ft (276 m)
- GNIS feature ID: 1834003

Fellows is a ghost town in the town of Center, Rock County, Wisconsin, United States.

== History ==
A post office called Fellows was established in 1887, and remained in operation until it was discontinued in 1902. The community was named for a local land owner.
