= Harrison Stebbins House =

Historic farmhouse in Wisconsin, US

- U.S. National Register of Historic Places
- Location within Wisconsin
- Nearest city: Evansville, Wisconsin
- Coordinates: 42°49′36″N 89°12′55″W
- Area: less than one acre
- Built: 1850; 176 years ago
- Architectural style: Greek Revival
- MPS: Cooksville MRA
- NRHP reference No.: 80000401
- Added to NRHP: September 17, 1980

The Harrison Stebbins House was a notable farmhouse built by the settler Harrison Stebbins near historic Cooksville, Wisconsin in 1850. It was a 2-1/2 story Federal Style house made of limestone, which the owners named Windermere. Unity magazine (Chicago) said

"[It] was built of stone and was almost palatial in type. On the third floor was a ballroom where on many occasions the brilliancy and culture of the New England settlers gathered from the country round to make merry ... [O]ne entered the grounds through a long avenue with over hanging trees."

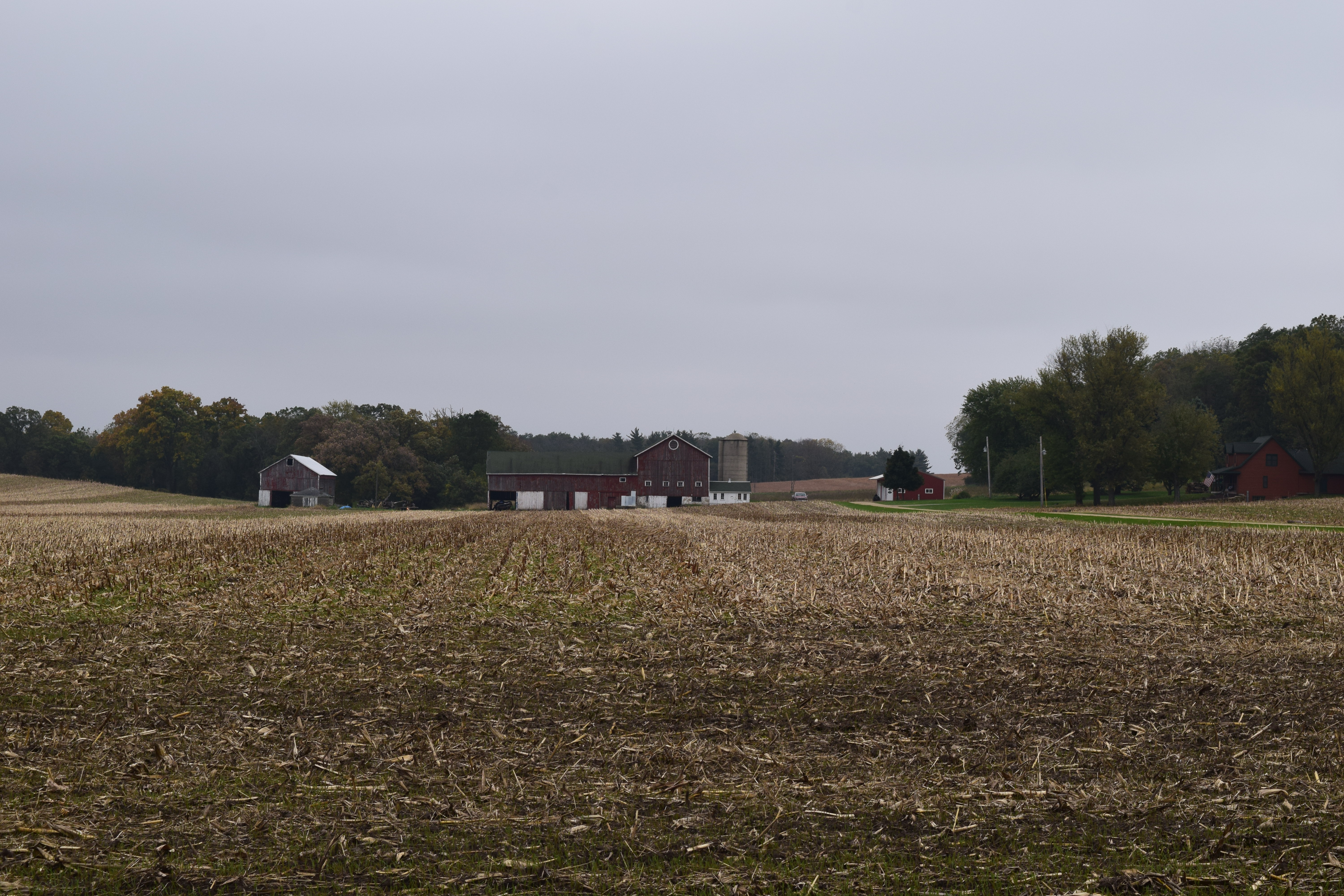
Site of the Harrison Stebbins House

The Stebbins House was added to the Wisconsin Register of Historic Places on January 1, 1989 (reference #84115), and the National Register of Historic Places on September 17, 1980 (reference #80000401). The avenue of trees was severely damaged by windstorms in the 1960s, and the house itself was demolished on November 27, 2013, after several unsuccessful attempts to move and save it.
