= Stebbinsville, Wisconsin =

- Unincorporated community
- Location within Wisconsin Location within the United States
- Coordinates: 42°50′40″N 89°10′23″W
- Country: United States
- State: Wisconsin
- County: Rock
- Elevation: 817 ft (249 m)
- Time zone: UTC-6 (Central (CST))
  - Summer (DST): UTC-5 (CDT)
- Area code: 608
- GNIS feature ID: 1577837

Stebbinsville is an unincorporated community in the town of Porter, Rock County, Wisconsin, United States. In 1867, Harrison Stebbins, farmer and politician, built a grist mill in Stebbinsville and later served as chairman of the Porter Town Board. Stebbinsville was named in his honor. It is also the site of the Gilley-Tofsland Octagonal Barn. Gilley was a son-in-law of Stebbins.
