= Center (community), Wisconsin =

Center
- Unincorporated community
- Location within Wisconsin
- Coordinates: 42°42′32″N 89°10′47″W
- Country: United States
- State: Wisconsin
- County: Rock
- Elevation: 968 ft (295 m)
- Time zone: UTC-6 (Central (CST))
  - Summer (DST): UTC-5 (CDT)

Center is an unincorporated community in the Town of Center, Rock County, Wisconsin, United States. Located in section 22 of Township 3 North Range 11 East of the Fourth Principal Meridian, Center has been published on USGS maps since 1891. Bethel Cemetery, the Town of Center town hall and Zion Lutheran Church are located in the community in section 22 at the intersection of Rock County Highway A and Church Road.
