= Fulton Congregational Church =

Historic church in Wisconsin, United States

- U.S. National Register of Historic Places
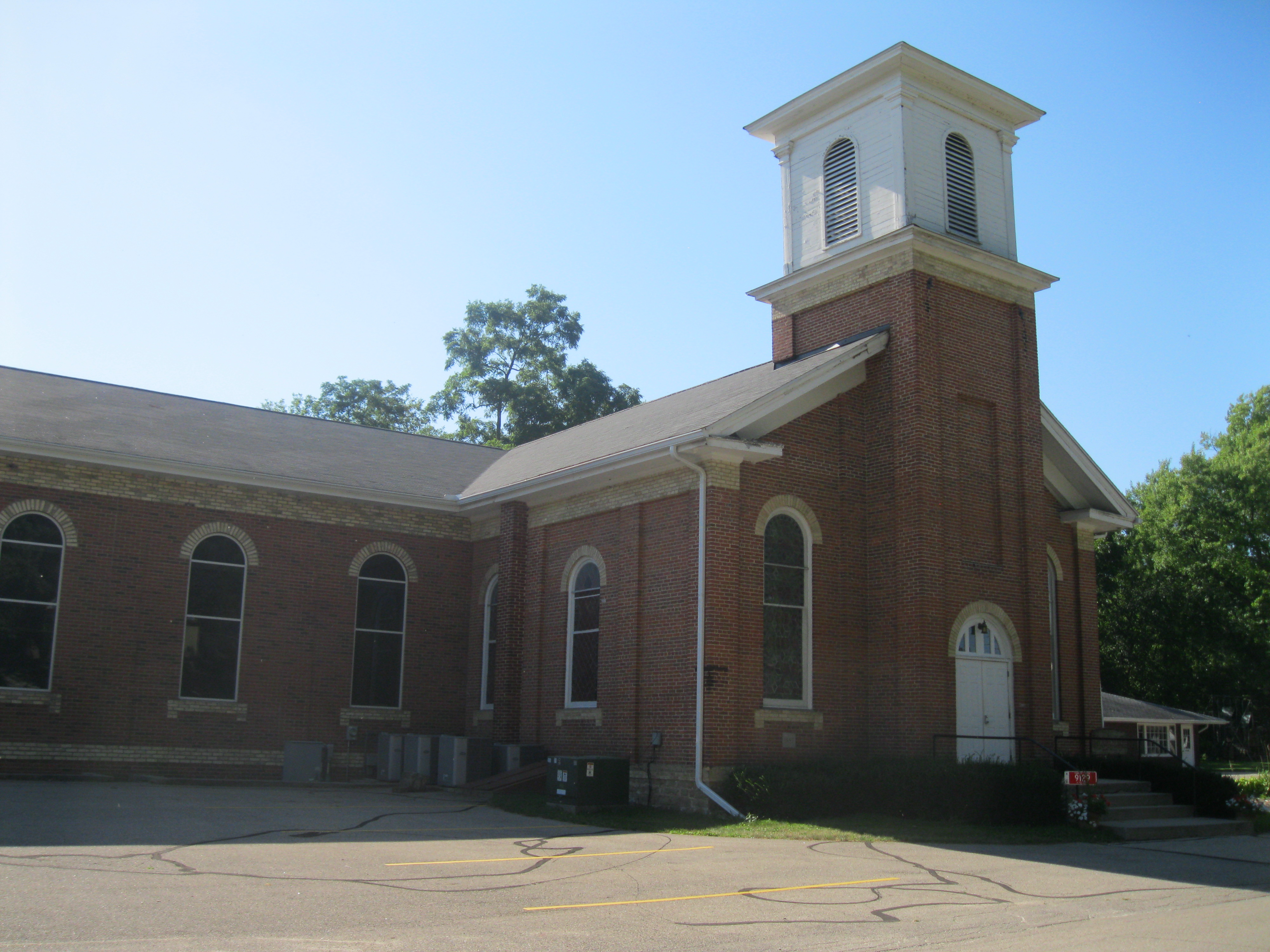

- Location within Wisconsin Location within the United States
- Location: Fulton St., Fulton, Wisconsin
- Coordinates: 42°48′21″N 89°7′44″W
- Area: less than one acre
- Built: 1857-59
- Architectural style: Greek Revival, Italianate
- NRHP reference No.: 76000077
- Added to NRHP: June 7, 1976

Fulton Congregational Church (Fulton Congregational Church, United Church of Christ) is a historic church on Fulton Street in Fulton, Wisconsin, United States. It was built in 1858 and was added to the National Register of Historic Places in 1976.

The congregation was organized in 1851 by Rev. Dexter Clary and Hiram Foote, and held services in the schoolhouse in the first years. The church building was constructed during 1857–59 for $2,800.

The building is one-story, 36 by 55 feet (11 m × 17 m), built of Cooksville red brick, with local tan brick for approx. seven course rim and base trim, on a limestone foundation. The cornice returns and pitch of the roof are Greek Revival elements. The walls and tower are varied with pilasters.

Additions constructed by Roberts Construction Inc were completed in 2016, with the latest new basketball court, dining hall and lower level educational classrooms, designed by nearby Madison architect Ron Siggelkow of Dimension IV. The addition created a new and compatible complement to the original historic chapel. The worship room/sanctuary from a previous addition accommodates a larger congregation than the original historic chapel, which now serves as a congregation room. A new lobby and entry connect the gym and the historic annex and the sanctuary overlooking the Yahara River.
