= Center, Rock County, Wisconsin =

Town of Center, Wisconsin
- Town
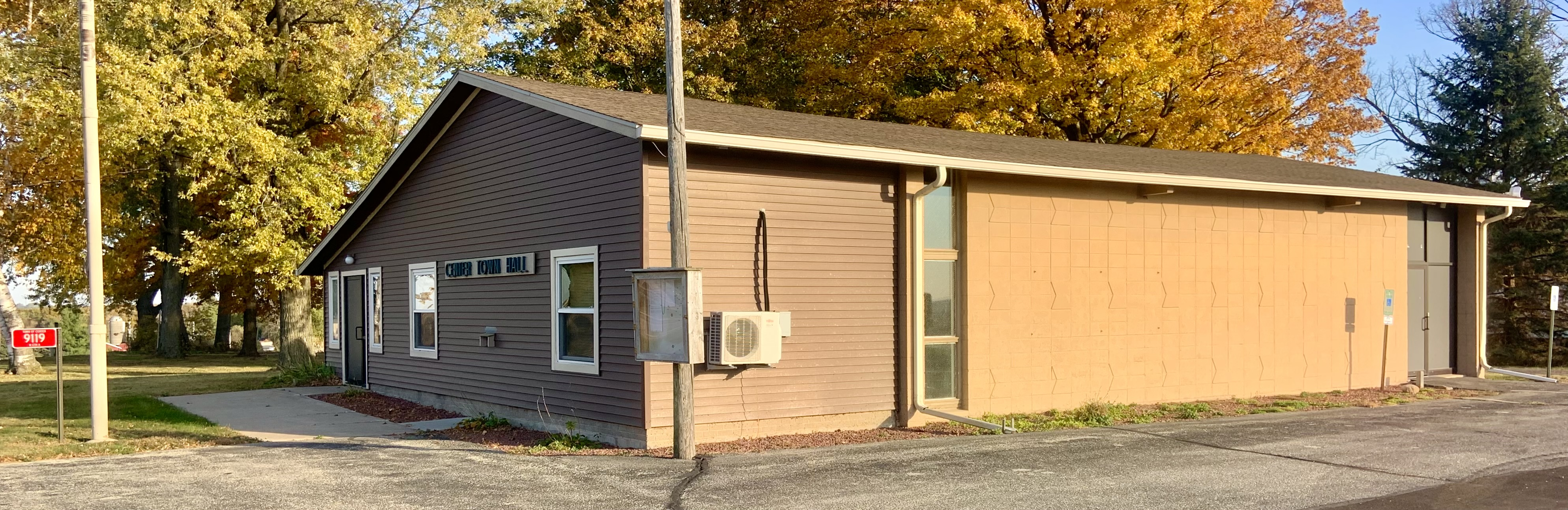
- Town hall

- Location in Rock County and the state of Wisconsin.
- Coordinates: 42°42′54″N 89°11′7″W
- Country: United States
- State: Wisconsin
- County: Rock

Area
  - Total: 35.6 sq mi (92.2 km^{2})
  - Land: 35.6 sq mi (92.2 km^{2})
  - Water: 0 sq mi (0.0 km^{2})
- Elevation: 968 ft (295 m)

Population (2020)
  - Total: 1,046
  - Density: 28/sq mi (10.9/km^{2})
- Time zone: UTC-6 (Central (CST))
  - Summer (DST): UTC-5 (CDT)
- Area code: 608
- FIPS code: 55-13625
- GNIS feature ID: 1582942
- Website: https://townofcenterrockcounty.com/

The Town of Center is located in Rock County, Wisconsin, United States. The population was 1,046 at the 2020 census. The unincorporated community of Center is in the town. The ghost town of Fellows was also located in the town.

== Geography ==
According to the United States Census Bureau, the town has a total area of 35.6 square miles (92.3 km^{2}), of which 35.6 square miles (92.2 km^{2}) is land and 0.03% is water.

== Demographics ==
As of the census of 2000, there were 1,005 people, 374 households, and 292 families residing in the town. The population density was 28.2 people per square mile (10.9/km^{2}). There were 384 housing units at an average density of 10.8 per square mile (4.2/km^{2}). The racial makeup of the town was 98.91% White, 0.10% African American, 0.20% Asian, 0.10% Pacific Islander, 0.30% from other races, and 0.40% from two or more races. Hispanic or Latino of any race were 0.30% of the population.

There were 374 households, out of which 35.8% had children under the age of 18 living with them, 70.6% were married couples living together, 4.3% had a female householder with no husband present, and 21.9% were non-families. 16.8% of all households were made up of individuals, and 5.1% had someone living alone who was 65 years of age or older. The average household size was 2.67 and the average family size was 3.04.

The population was 24.9% under the age of 18, 6.3% from 18 to 24, 31.9% from 25 to 44, 25.2% from 45 to 64, and 11.7% who were 65 years of age or older. The median age was 39 years. For every 100 females, there were 104.3 males. For every 100 females age 18 and over, there were 107.4 males.

The median income for a household in the town was $59,479, and the median income for a family was $63,750. Males had a median income of $38,906 versus $26,905 for females. The per capita income for the town was $23,982. About 0.7% of families and 1.5% of the population were below the poverty line, including 1.6% of those under age 18 and none of those age 65 or over.

== Notable people ==
- Grant U. Fisher, Wisconsin politician, was born in the town
- Charles D. Rosa, Wisconsin politician and jurist, was born in the town

== See also ==
- List of towns in Wisconsin
