= Cooksville, Wisconsin =

Unincorporated community in Wisconsin, US

- Unincorporated community
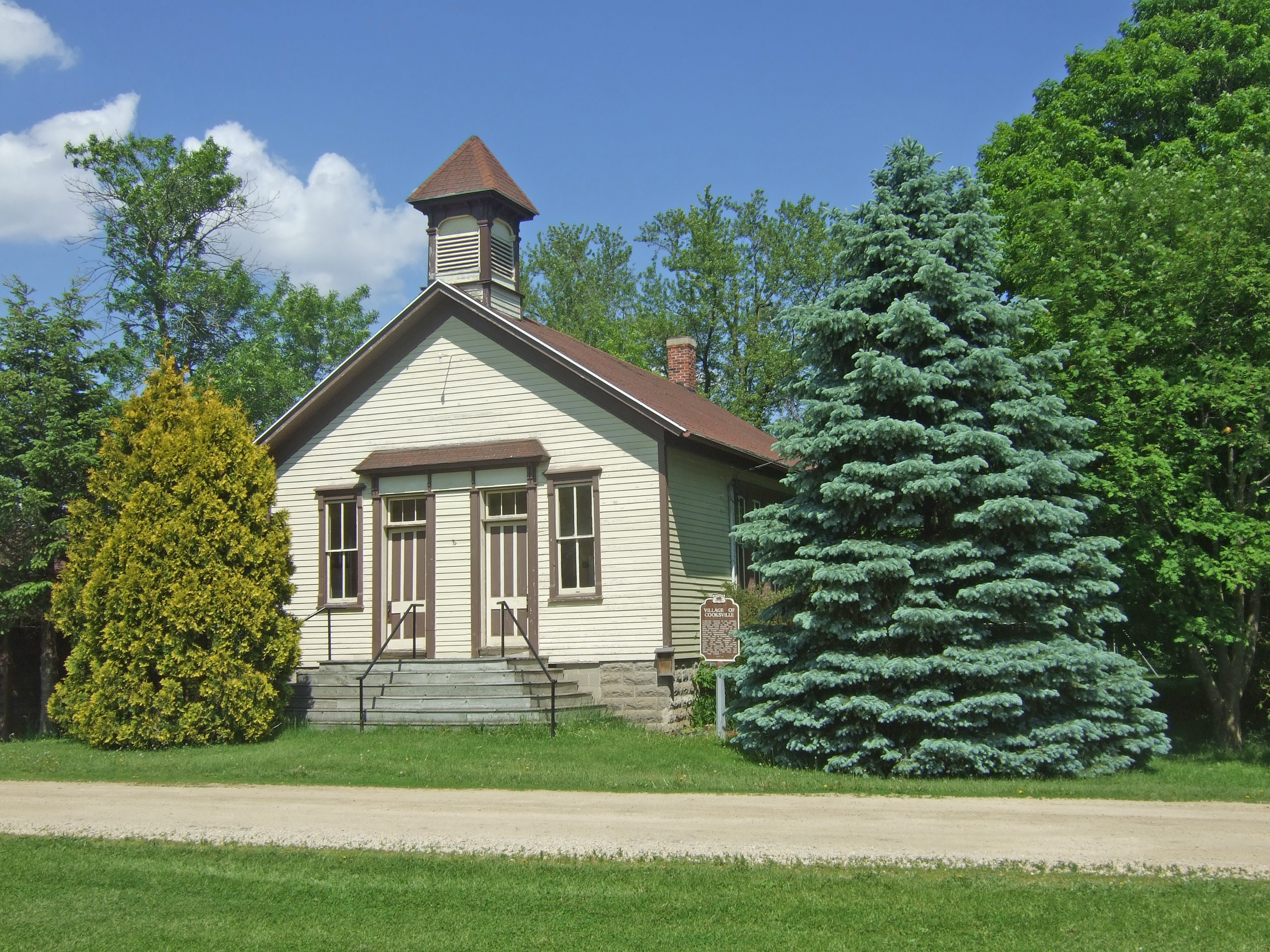

- Location within Wisconsin Location within the United States
- Coordinates: 42°50′07″N 89°14′26″W
- Country: United States
- State: Wisconsin
- County: Rock
- Elevation: 883 ft (269 m)
- Time zone: UTC-6 (Central (CST))
  - Summer (DST): UTC-5 (CDT)
- Area code: 608
- GNIS feature ID: 1563351

Cooksville is an unincorporated community in the Town of Porter, Rock County, Wisconsin, United States.

== History ==
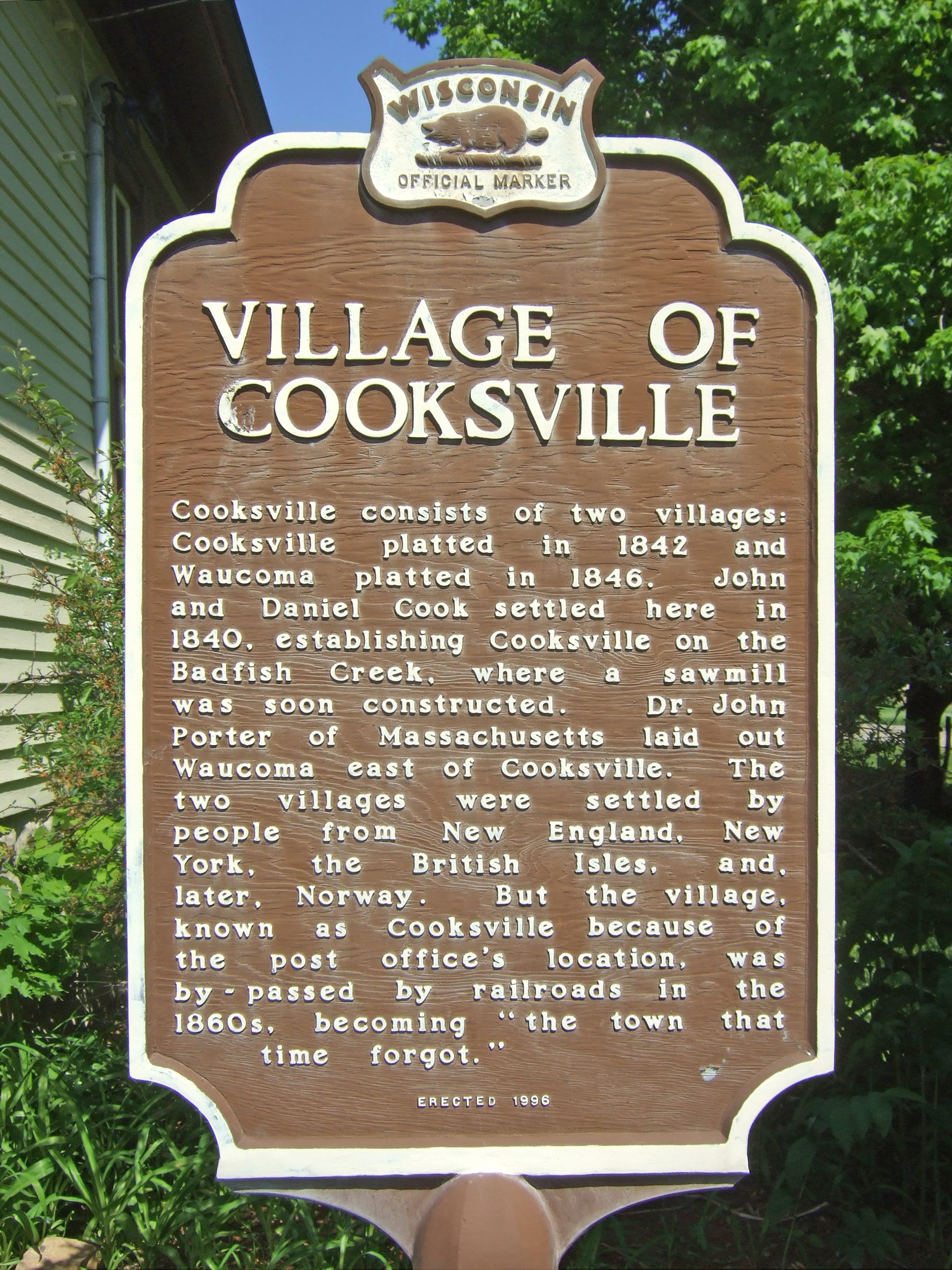

The land where Cooksville lies was originally purchased by the New Hampshire lawyer and statesman, Daniel Webster, for $1.25 an acre. Webster also represented other investors in the land purchase. Early pioneers were established by 1837. Many of the original settlers of the village were from New England and left their imprint on the town and village architecture. Brick homes stand on three sides of a common or square, typical of the New England village tradition. By 1976 there were only 80 residents, half the population of the town in 1850. "Traditional Cooksville has remained the same, untouched by progress. Cooksville residents hope it will continue to be known as a town that time forgot."

== Community ==
Cooksville was home to the Cooksville Store, one of the oldest continuously operating general stores in the state of Wisconsin.

The Miller House, located in the community, is listed on the National Register of Historic Places.

== Notable people ==
- Peter Egan, Road & Track and Cycle World columnist
- Gideon Ellis Newman, Wisconsin State Representative
- John L. Savage, engineer
- John Wilde, painter
