= Rock County, Wisconsin =

County in Wisconsin, United States

- County
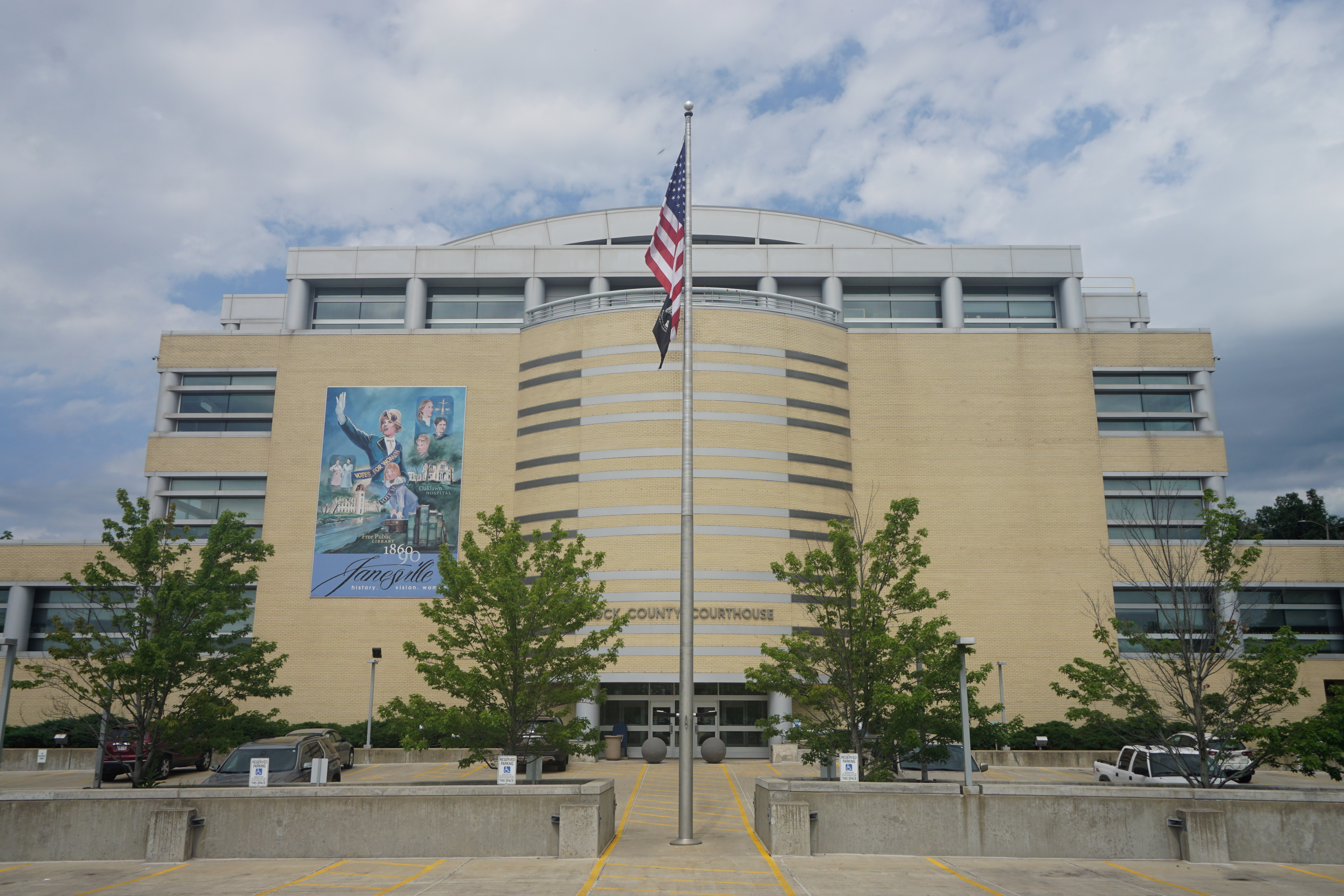
- Rock County Courthouse

- Seal

- Location within the U.S. state of Wisconsin
- Coordinates: 42°40′N 89°04′W
- Country: United States
- State: Wisconsin
- Founded: 1839
- Named for: Rock River
- Seat: Janesville
- Largest city: Janesville

Area
  - Total: 726 sq mi (1,880 km^{2})
  - Land: 718 sq mi (1,860 km^{2})
  - Water: 8.0 sq mi (21 km^{2}) 1.1%

Population (2020)
  - Total: 163,687
  - Estimate (2025): 166,472 ▲
  - Density: 228/sq mi (88.0/km^{2})
- Time zone: UTC−6 (Central)
  - Summer (DST): UTC−5 (CDT)
- Congressional districts: 1st, 2nd
- Website: www.co.rock.wi.us

Rock County is a county in the U.S. state of Wisconsin. As of the 2020 census, the population was 163,687. Its county seat is Janesville. Rock County comprises the Janesville–Beloit metropolitan statistical area and is included in the Madison–Janesville–Beloit combined statistical area.

== History ==
Rock County was created as a territorial county on December 7, 1836, from Milwaukee County and fully organized February 19, 1839. The county is named for the Rock River, which bisects the county from north to south.

== Geography ==
According to the U.S. Census Bureau, the county has a total area of 726 square miles (1,880 km^{2}), of which 718 square miles (1,860 km^{2}) is land and 8.0 square miles (21 km^{2}) (1.1%) is water.

Cook Memorial Arboretum, a natural area with birding and nature trails, is located northwest of Janesville. It is owned by the Janesville School District.

== Transportation ==
=== Major highways ===
- Interstate 39
- Interstate 43
- Interstate 90
- U.S. Highway 12
- U.S. Highway 14
- U.S. Highway 51
- Highway 11
- Highway 26
- Highway 59
- Highway 67
- Highway 81
- Highway 89
- Highway 104
- Highway 138
- Highway 140
- Highway 213

=== Railroads ===
- Canadian Pacific
- Union Pacific
- Wisconsin and Southern Railroad

=== Buses ===
- Beloit Transit
- Janesville Transit System

=== Airport ===
Southern Wisconsin Regional Airport (KJVL) serves Rock County and the surrounding communities.

== Adjacent counties ==
- Green County – west
- Dane County – north
- Jefferson County – northeast
- Walworth County – east
- Boone County, Illinois – south
- Winnebago County, Illinois – south

== Demographics ==
Historical population
Census	Pop.	Note	%±
1840	1,701		—
1850	20,750		1,119.9%
1860	36,690		76.8%
1870	39,030		6.4%
1880	38,823		−0.5%
1890	43,220		11.3%
1900	51,203		18.5%
1910	55,538		8.5%
1920	66,150		19.1%
1930	74,206		12.2%
1940	80,173		8.0%
1950	92,778		15.7%
1960	113,913		22.8%
1970	131,970		15.9%
1980	139,420		5.6%
1990	139,510		0.1%
2000	152,307		9.2%
2010	160,331		5.3%
2020	163,687		2.1%
2025 (est.)	166,472	▲	1.7%
U.S. Decennial Census; 1790–1960 1900–1990; 1990–2000 2010 2020

=== Racial and ethnic composition ===
Rock County, Wisconsin – Racial and ethnic composition Note: the US Census treats Hispanic/Latino as an ethnic category. This table excludes Latinos from the racial categories and assigns them to a separate category. Hispanics/Latinos may be of any race.
Race / ethnicity (NH = Non-Hispanic)	Pop 1980	Pop 1990	Pop 2000	Pop 2010	Pop 2020	% 1980	% 1990	% 2000	% 2010	% 2020
White alone (NH)	132,785	129,788	135,884	135,526	129,796	95.24%	93.03%	89.22%	84.53%	79.30%
Black or African American alone (NH)	4,660	6,593	6,943	7,766	8,060	3.34%	4.73%	4.56%	4.84%	4.92%
Native American or Alaska Native alone (NH)	269	356	376	383	386	0.19%	0.26%	0.25%	0.24%	0.24%
Asian alone (NH)	539	932	1,180	1,603	2,022	0.39%	0.67%	0.77%	1.00%	1.24%
Native Hawaiian or Pacific Islander alone (NH)	x	x	50	35	50	x	x	0.03%	0.02%	0.03%
Other race alone (NH)	209	87	143	125	523	0.15%	0.06%	0.09%	0.08%	0.32%
Mixed race or Multiracial (NH)	x	x	1,778	2,769	7,050	x	x	1.17%	1.73%	4.31%
Hispanic or Latino (any race)	958	1,754	5,953	12,124	15,800	0.69%	1.26%	3.91%	7.56%	9.65%
Total	139,420	139,510	152,307	160,331	163,687	100.00%	100.00%	100.00%	100.00%	100.00%

=== 2020 census ===
As of the 2020 census, the population was 163,687 and the median age was 40.3 years. 22.9% of residents were under the age of 18 and 17.6% of residents were 65 years of age or older. For every 100 females there were 97.5 males, and for every 100 females age 18 and over there were 95.1 males age 18 and over.

The population density was 227.9 people per square mile (88.0 people/km^{2}), and there were 70,068 housing units at an average density of 97.6 units per square mile (37.7 units/km^{2}).

The racial makeup of the county was 81.3% White, 5.1% Black or African American, 0.5% American Indian and Alaska Native, 1.3% Asian, <0.1% Native Hawaiian and Pacific Islander, 4.6% from some other race, and 7.2% from two or more races. Hispanic or Latino residents of any race comprised 9.7% of the population.

80.0% of residents lived in urban areas, while 20.0% lived in rural areas.

There were 65,937 households in the county, of which 29.6% had children under the age of 18 living in them. Of all households, 46.1% were married-couple households, 18.6% were households with a male householder and no spouse or partner present, and 26.1% were households with a female householder and no spouse or partner present. About 28.3% of all households were made up of individuals and 12.0% had someone living alone who was 65 years of age or older.

Of those housing units, 5.9% were vacant. Among occupied housing units, 69.0% were owner-occupied and 31.0% were renter-occupied. The homeowner vacancy rate was 1.0% and the rental vacancy rate was 4.8%.

2000 Census Age Pyramid for Rock County

=== 2010 census ===
As of the 2010 census, there were 160,331 people residing in the county.

=== 2000 census ===
As of the 2000 census, there were 152,307 people, 58,617 households, and 40,387 families residing in the county. The population density was 211 people per square mile (81 people/km^{2}). There were 62,187 housing units at an average density of 86 units per square mile (33 units/km^{2}).

The racial makeup of the county was 91.01% white, 4.63% black or African American, 0.28% Native American, 0.78% Asian, 0.04% Pacific Islander, 1.77% from other races, and 1.50% from two or more races. 3.91% of the population were Hispanic or Latino of any race. 32.8% were of German, 13.0% Norwegian, 10.1% Irish, 7.5% English and 5.5% American ancestry.

There were 58,617 households, out of which 33.60% had children under the age of 18 living with them, 53.50% were married couples living together, 10.90% had a female householder with no husband present, and 31.10% were non-families. 25.10% of all households were made up of individuals, and 9.70% had someone living alone who was 65 years of age or older. The average household size was 2.54 and the average family size was 3.03.

In the county, the population was spread out, with 26.50% under the age of 18, 8.60% from 18 to 24, 29.80% from 25 to 44, 22.30% from 45 to 64, and 12.70% who were 65 years of age or older. The median age was 36 years. For every 100 females there were 97.00 males. For every 100 females age 18 and over, there were 94.10 males.

== Communities ==
=== Cities ===
- Beloit
- Brodhead (mostly in Green County)
- Edgerton (partly in Dane County)
- Evansville
- Janesville (County seat)
- Milton

=== Villages ===
- Clinton
- Orfordville
- Footville

=== Towns ===
- Avon
- Beloit
- Bradford
- Center
- Clinton
- Fulton
- Harmony
- Janesville
- Johnstown
- La Prairie
- Lima
- Magnolia
- Milton
- Newark
- Plymouth
- Porter
- Rock
- Spring Valley
- Turtle
- Union

=== Census-designated places ===
- Fulton
- Hanover
- Shopiere

=== Unincorporated communities ===
- Afton
- Anderson
- Avalon
- Avon
- Belcrest
- Bergen
- Cainville
- Center
- Charlie Bluff
- Cooksville
- Coopers Shores
- Crestview
- Emerald Grove
- Fairfield (partial)
- Foxhollow
- Indianford
- Johnstown
- Johnstown Center
- Koshkonong (partial)
- Leyden
- Lima Center
- Magnolia
- Mallwood
- Maple Beach
- Newark
- Newville
- Porters
- Stebbinsville
- Tiffany
- Union
- Victory Heights

=== Ghost towns/neighborhoods ===
- Fellows
- Jefferson Prairie Settlement

== Politics ==
United States presidential election results for Rock County, Wisconsin
Year	Republican		Democratic		Third party(ies)	
Year	No.	%	No.	%	No.	%
1892	6,052	55.24%	4,231	38.62%	673	6.14%
1896	8,282	67.46%	3,655	29.77%	340	2.77%
1900	8,249	69.97%	3,094	26.24%	447	3.79%
1904	7,972	71.65%	2,348	21.10%	807	7.25%
1908	7,839	66.81%	3,227	27.50%	668	5.69%
1912	4,276	43.21%	3,032	30.64%	2,587	26.14%
1916	7,011	61.09%	4,015	34.98%	451	3.93%
1920	16,152	83.53%	2,447	12.65%	738	3.82%
1924	14,815	60.92%	1,453	5.97%	8,052	33.11%
1928	21,497	70.75%	8,726	28.72%	161	0.53%
1932	16,825	56.07%	12,612	42.03%	571	1.90%
1936	14,693	43.56%	17,991	53.34%	1,045	3.10%
1940	20,141	53.15%	17,543	46.29%	214	0.56%
1944	18,477	52.23%	16,766	47.39%	133	0.38%
1948	17,068	50.66%	16,150	47.93%	474	1.41%
1952	27,837	64.64%	15,183	35.26%	45	0.10%
1956	28,980	67.42%	13,834	32.18%	173	0.40%
1960	29,675	60.63%	19,194	39.22%	76	0.16%
1964	20,372	41.85%	28,257	58.04%	55	0.11%
1968	25,229	50.97%	20,567	41.56%	3,697	7.47%
1972	30,361	58.03%	21,033	40.20%	925	1.77%
1976	28,325	49.04%	28,048	48.56%	1,389	2.40%
1980	30,960	50.60%	24,740	40.44%	5,482	8.96%
1984	32,491	54.76%	26,433	44.55%	410	0.69%
1988	28,178	48.43%	29,576	50.83%	434	0.75%
1992	21,942	31.79%	31,154	45.13%	15,929	23.08%
1996	20,096	33.32%	32,450	53.80%	7,774	12.89%
2000	27,467	39.01%	40,472	57.49%	2,465	3.50%
2004	33,151	41.19%	46,598	57.90%	730	0.91%
2008	27,364	34.56%	50,529	63.82%	1,276	1.61%
2012	30,517	37.82%	49,219	61.00%	954	1.18%
2016	31,493	41.40%	39,339	51.71%	5,242	6.89%
2020	37,138	43.51%	46,658	54.66%	1,564	1.83%
2024	40,218	45.54%	46,642	52.82%	1,450	1.64%

Since 1988, Rock County has consistently voted for the Democratic candidate in every Presidential election. In 2024, Kamala Harris carried the county by the smallest margin of victory since Michael Dukakis in 1988.

== Education ==
School districts include:

- Albany School District
- School District of Beloit
- Beloit Turner School District
- Brodhead School District
- Clinton Community School District
- Delavan-Darien School District
- Edgerton School District
- Evansville Community School District
- Fort Atkinson School District
- School District of Janesville
- Milton School District
- Oregon School District
- Parkview School District
- Stoughton Area School District
- Whitewater School District

There is a state-operated school, Wisconsin School for the Blind and Visually Impaired.

== See also ==
- National Register of Historic Places listings in Rock County, Wisconsin
