= Beloit water tower =

Coordinates: 42.5091°N 89.0305°W

- U.S. National Register of Historic Places
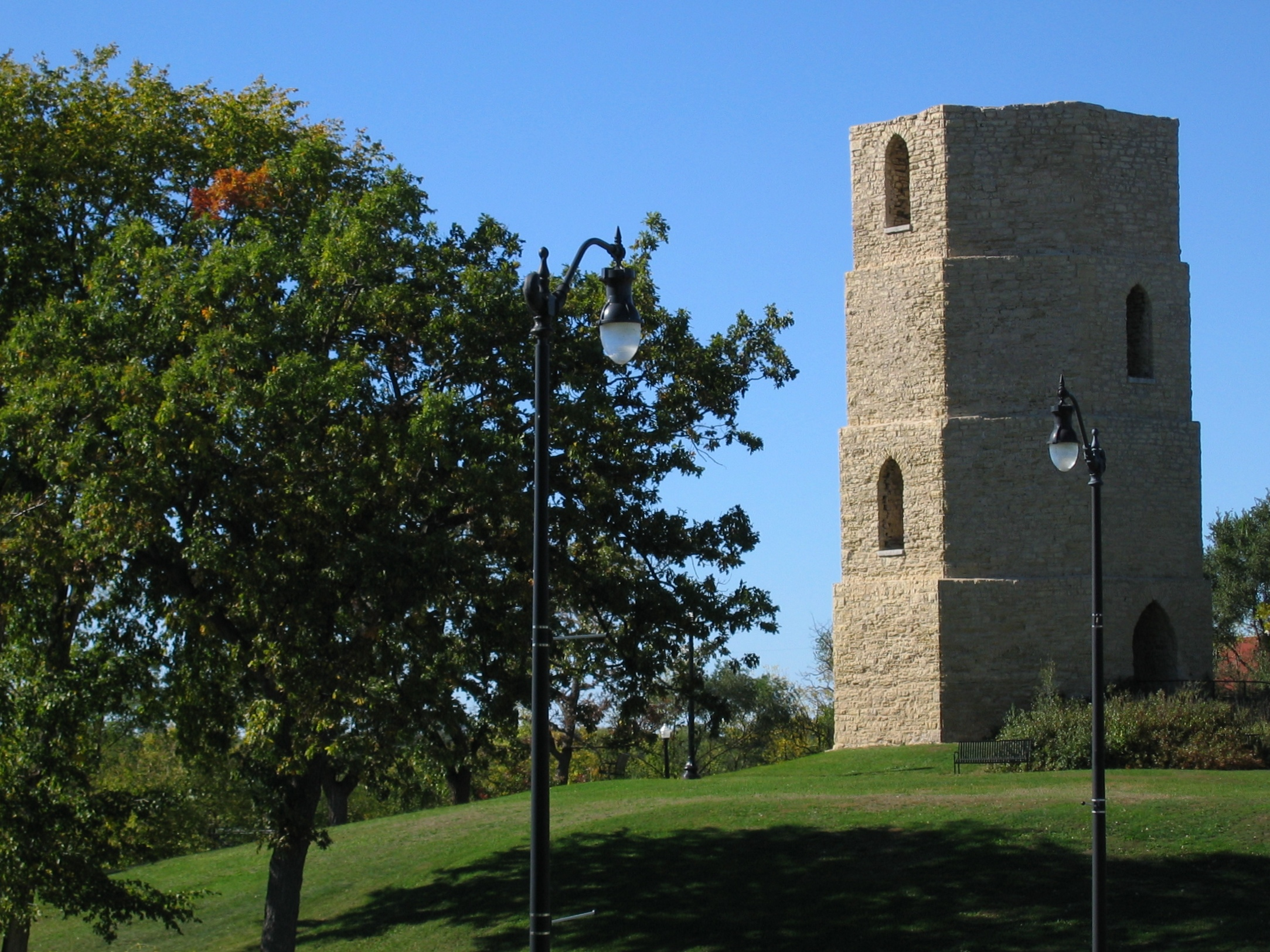
- Beloit water tower
- Location: 1005 Pleasant St. Beloit, Wisconsin
- Architect: J. B. Kinley
- MPS: Beloit MRA
- NRHP reference No.: 83003410
- Added to NRHP: January 7, 1983

The Beloit water tower is a historic octagonal limestone water tower completed in 1889 in Beloit, Wisconsin.

In Beloit's younger days, the city's fire protection consisted of two volunteer companies with hoses and mobile pumps that drew water from the Rock River and from private wells and cisterns. Several businesses burned just beyond reach of the hoses and finally in 1884 St. Thomas Catholic and Baptist churches went up in flames. Beyond fire protection, a source of clean drinking water would reduce the risk of diseases like diphtheria and typhoid fever. The rough-edged community debated for years whether a better water supply should be city-owned or a private enterprise.

Finally in 1885 a consortium of local businessmen agreed to finance a private water works project. The financiers were: C.H. Morse, W.H. Wheeler, J.B. Peet, E.C. Allen, C.B. Salmon, and C.H. Parker. They hired Fairbanks, Morse Co. of Chicago to design the system, and J.B. Kinley designed the tower. It sits on one of the high points of town, with limestone walls 36 feet tall. The walls are octagonal, 36 feet in diameter at the base with walls eight feet thick. As the walls rise, they taper in four stages with the top stage 30 feet in diameter. Lancet-arched windows let light into the tower. Originally, a tank 20 feet deep sat atop the tower, built of 3-inch cypress and holding 100,000 gallons of water. A pumping station was built just southwest of the tower, powered by steam-operated Smith and Vale pumps. The resulting system could shoot a two-inch stream of water 130 feet high. Seven miles of water mains were laid through the city feeding 72 hydrants. For the fire protection, the city paid a tax to the consortium. The water-works also tried to entice homeowners to give up their private wells and switch to city water, offering free pipe to the curb for the first 100 patrons.

In 1914 the cypress tank collapsed. The water-works replaced it with a metal tank of the same size, built by the Eclipse Wind Mill Company, right in Beloit. On top of the tank was a cupola, and a flag pole on top of that.

By 1929 the water system served 25,000 customers, but the tower was outdated. A modern (for the time) steel tower was built nearby, with a 200,000 gallon tank. The metal tank was removed from the old tower, the stairs inside were removed, and demolition of the stone walls began, but the walls were well-built, and demolition was deemed too expensive. After demolition was given up, a Beloit Daily News article stated that the tower was "once regarded as the finest piece of masonry in the west". In 1983 it was listed on the National Register of Historic Places.

Now, the stone water tower is a visible community landmark offering excellent photo opportunities for camera buffs. The area surrounding the tower has been developed into Water Tower Park with an ADA accessible walkway. The Water Works Pump House has been completely restored and currently houses the City of Beloit Parks and Leisure Services offices and Friends of Riverfront offices. Also, visitors are welcome to stop in during business hours. The Shingle Style pump house at the base of the bluff now acts as the Beloit Visitor Center.

== See also ==
- Paxton Water Tower and Pump House: NRHP-listed octagonal water tower in Illinois
