= City of Beloit Waterworks and Pump Station =

- U.S. National Register of Historic Places
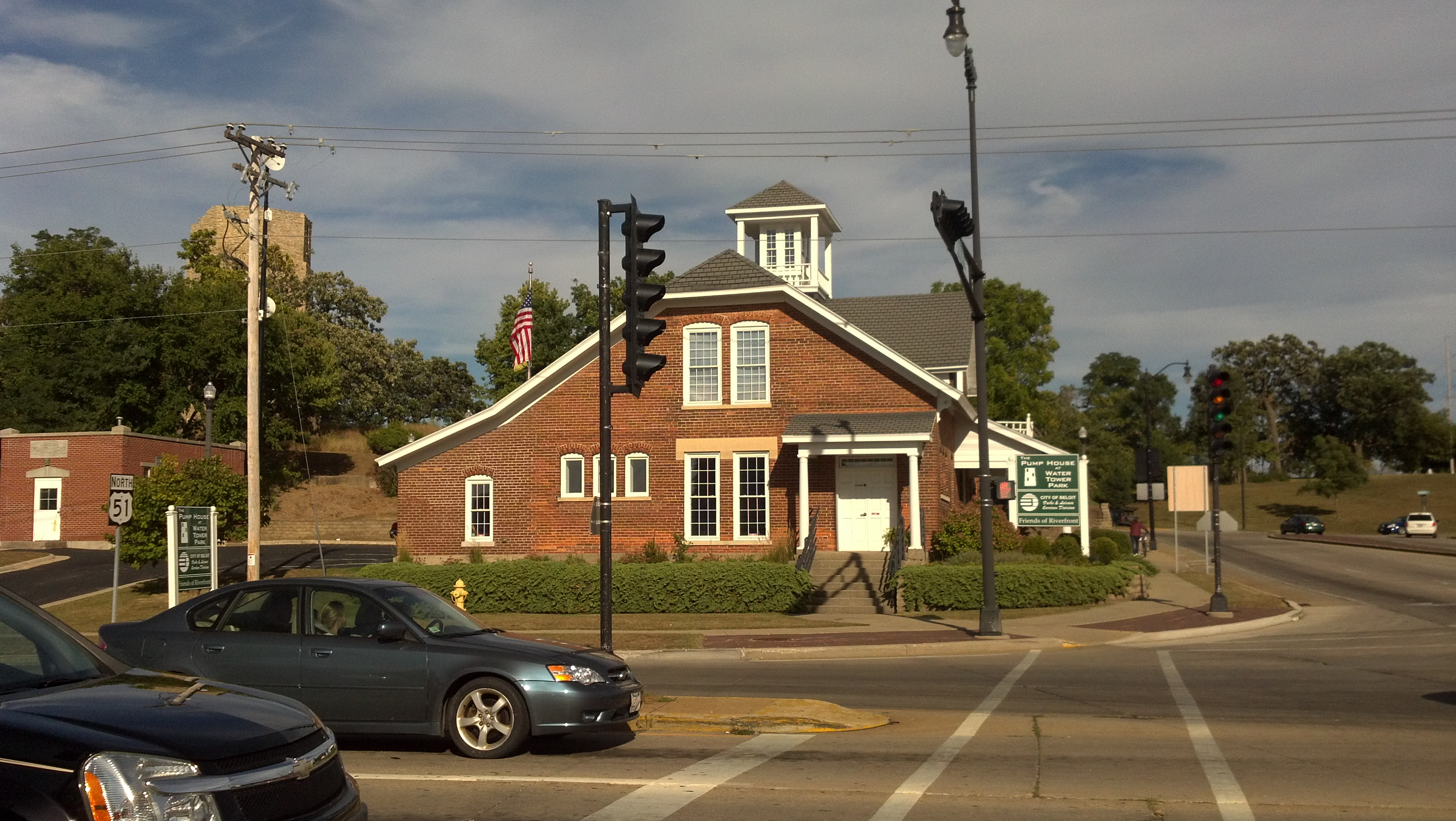
- Location: 1005 Pleasant St. Beloit, Wisconsin
- Coordinates: 42.50861°N 89.03142°W
- NRHP reference No.: 90001460
- Added to NRHP: September 13, 1990

The City of Beloit Waterworks and Pump Station was built in 1885 in Beloit, Wisconsin just below a hill on top of which sits the Beloit Water Tower. It was added to the National Register of Historic Places in 1990.

Beloit was first settled in 1836, and the city incorporated in 1856. In those early years, fire fighters had to draw water from private wells and cisterns, which were often inadequate, resulting in lost buildings. Also, diphtheria and typhoid fever were around, transmitted through contaminated water. Both problems could be addressed by a public waterworks system. Many agreed on that, but they debated whether it should a public project owned by the city, or a private for-profit venture.

About 1885, two of the city's manufacturing companies expanded: the Eclipse Wind Engine Company (later Fairbanks-Morse), and the Beloit Iron Works. With those factories and the accompanying population growth, the citizens approved a privately owned water utility, with the city paying a tax for use of fire hydrants and the public paying a charge per faucet. The Beloit Water Company was formed, and built the pump station which is the subject of this article.

In 1885 the company built the pump station and the concrete reservoir. The reservoir is 40 feet by 115 feet by three feet high, built into the hill. The station is 1.5 stories with a clipped gable roof. Walls are red brick with shallow segmental arches above most windows. The main entrance is protected by a shed-roofed porch supported by columns. A balcony originally protruded above and beside the porch, but that has been removed. The roof was originally covered with slate. Originally the interior was divided into a pump room on the west, a boiler room in the middle, and a room for coal storage on the east.

The Beloit Water Company also laid over seven miles of mains and installed 72 hydrants on both sides of the Rock River. The octagonal stone water tower up the hill was added to the system in 1889. It supported a 100,000 gallon cypress tank which held the water. With that, the pumping station could periodically feed water into the tank, and gravity supplied constant water pressure from the tank to homes and businesses. When there was a fire, the pumping station fed directly into the mains and hydrants to supply the fire-fighting equipment more than twice the pressure of the water tower.

In 1927 the metal water tower was built to replace the old stone and wood one. Taller than the old one, it provided water at 80 pounds per square inch as compared to 50 before. At about the same time the new pump shed was added to the complex.

The NRHP nomination considers the waterworks complex significant as "the only remaining unaltered public service building in Beloit form the 19th century." It is also a symbol of the early community coming together to provide fire protection and improve the health of all citizens.
