= Samuel Colley =

American politician

Samuel Gerish Colley (December 8, 1807 - October 21, 1890) was an American farmer, sheriff, politician and Indian Agent from Turtle and Beloit, Wisconsin, who served three one-year terms in the Wisconsin State Assembly. He became notorious for malfeasance in office as federal agent for the Upper Arkansas River valley tribes. His actions are considered by some to be one of the causes of the Colorado War.

== Background ==
Colley was born in Bedford, New Hampshire, on December 8, 1807, son of Joseph Colley, Jr. He married Lydia Atwood (1809 - 1874) of Bedford in 1832 (they were to have one child, Dexter). Colley was part of Horace White's New England Emigrating Company group who moved into the Beloit area en masse from New Hampshire and other parts of New England. He arrived in the spring of 1838, and claimed 320 acres (one half of a square mile) in Section 21 of the Town of Beloit, on which he built a small frame house in which eleven people spent that winter, though there was only one bed in the house.

By the winter of 1839, Colley was a justice of the peace, and as such performed the first marriage held in the incipient village of Beloit. In 1840 his father joined him in Wisconsin. His father was a delegate to the Second Wisconsin Constitutional Convention in 1848.

== Elected offices ==
In 1842, the first meeting of the town board of the Town of Beloit elected him one of their three highway commissioners. In 1845 he was elected to the Rock County Board of Supervisors. In 1848 he was elected as a Free Soil Party member of the Assembly (although at one time he and his father had been Whigs. The previous members from Beloit, Robert T. Carey and Nathaniel Strong, had been respectively a Whig and a Democrat. He was succeeded by John R. Briggs, a Whig.

== After the Assembly ==
In 1850, Colley went to California's gold fields, but returned the next year. In 1851, he served as was one of the judges of the plowing contest at the first Wisconsin State Fair. In 1853, he was again elected to the Assembly, this time as a member of the new Republican Party to succeed Whig William D. Murray, winning with a majority of 224 votes over former Democratic Assemblyman John Hackett. He was re-elected in 1854; and was succeeded after the 1855 election by fellow Republican Horatio J. Murray. In 1855, he was elected once more to the Rock County Board, this time from the City of Beloit; and again in 1859; in the latter year he was chairman of the board, as his father had been in 1847 and 1848. At some point during this time, he was also one of the three-person board elected by the county board as Superintendents of the Poor, in charge of the county poor house and poor farm.

== Out west again ==
In 1860 Colley followed his son Dexter out to Colorado Territory. In 1861, his cousin William P. Dole became Commissioner of Indian Affairs, and Colley was appointed Indian Agent for the Upper Arkansas Indian Agency at Fort Wise, later Fort Lyon. He has long been widely accused of stealing many of the better goods intended for the Indians there, which were sold by Dexter, who was an Indian trader, to Dexter's great profit. Although Colley had declared "a little powder and lead the best food" for the restive local tribes, he denounced the Sand Creek massacre, assailing Colonel Chivington's actions in no uncertain terms. At least one modern study of the background to these events concluded that Colley, while not understanding the Indians, may have been a good administrator and not merely the exemplar of corruption as which he is usually depicted. With the Indians gone, Colley resigned in 1865 and returned to Wisconsin.

== Back in Wisconsin ==
Lydia Atwood Colley had died in 1873; in 1874 Samuel was remarried to Clarissa Barnes Boutwell (1833 - 1911). In 1876, he was elected for a two-year term as County Sheriff. During his term as sheriff, Clarissa prevented some of the prisoners in the county jail from escaping, and was presented with a pistol to commemorate her bravery.

He and Clarissa were members of the local Congregational church.

Colley retired to his farm in the Town of Turtle. He died October 21, 1890, in Beloit, and is buried in Oakwood Cemetery there.
