= Paxton Water Tower and Pump House =

- U.S. National Register of Historic Places
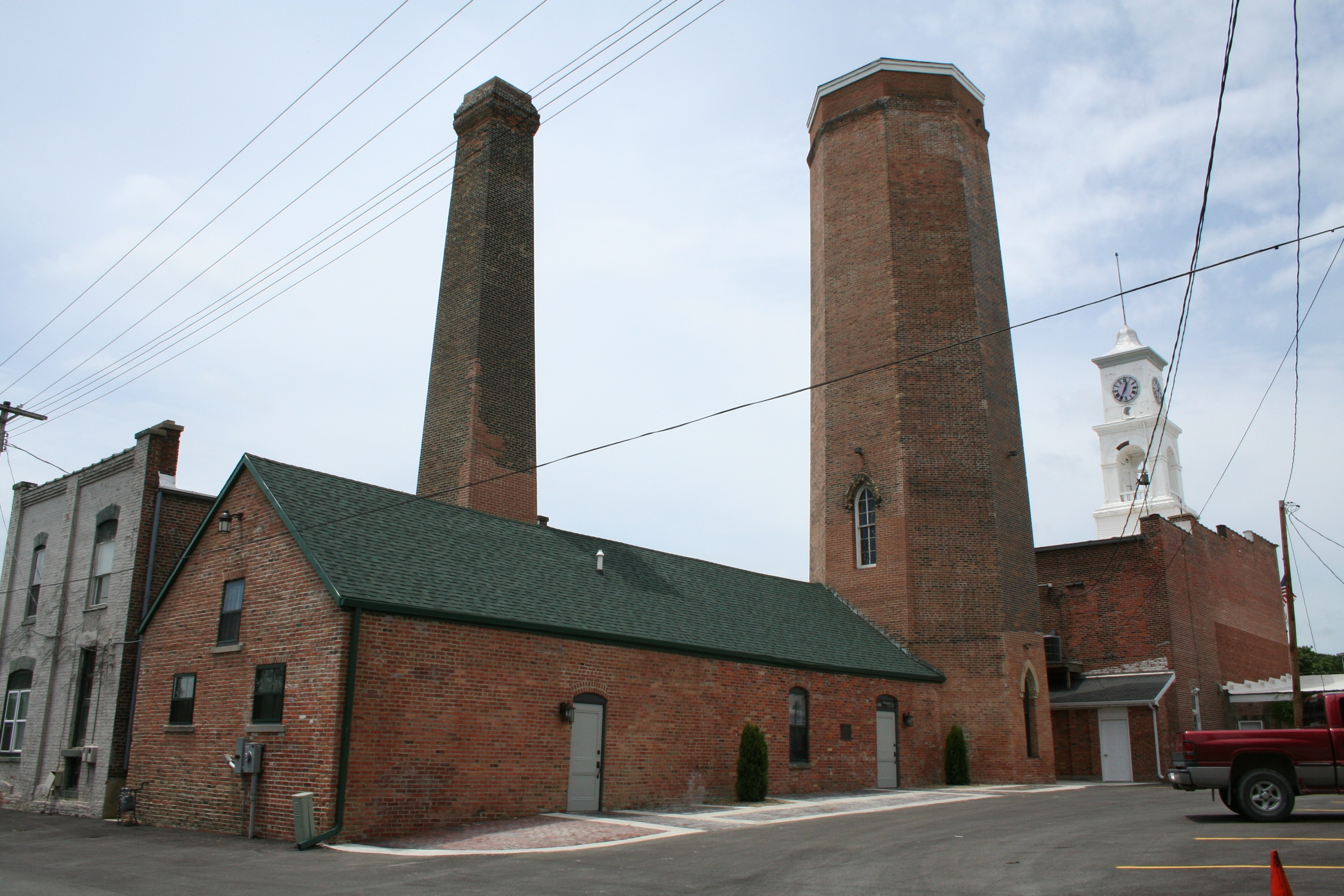
- Rear of the water tower and pump house

- Location within Illinois Location within the United States
- Location: 145 S. Market St., Paxton, Illinois
- Coordinates: 40°27′31″N 88°5′45″W
- Area: less than one acre
- Built: 1887
- Built by: Fairbanks, Morse & Co.
- Architectural style: Gothic
- NRHP reference No.: 84000302
- Added to NRHP: November 13, 1984

The Paxton Water Tower and Pump House are a historic water tower and pump house located at 145 S. Market St. in Paxton, Illinois.

The buildings were built in 1887 to provide a steady water supply to Paxton. Prior to their construction, Paxton had considerable difficulty with its water supply; a fire which destroyed much of the city's downtown in 1870 had been exacerbated by the fire department's low water supply, and an artesian well project started in 1872 was unsuccessful. The new water tower and pump house were the first in a series of infrastructure improvements which spurred the economic development of Paxton. The two buildings were built with brick. The octagonal water tower is 80 feet (24 m) tall. There used to be a water tank on top of the pump house tower which was missing for many years. A replica of the original water tank was installed in August, 2025.

The buildings were added to the National Register of Historic Places in 1984. It is one of four sites on the National Register in Paxton and one of five in Ford County.

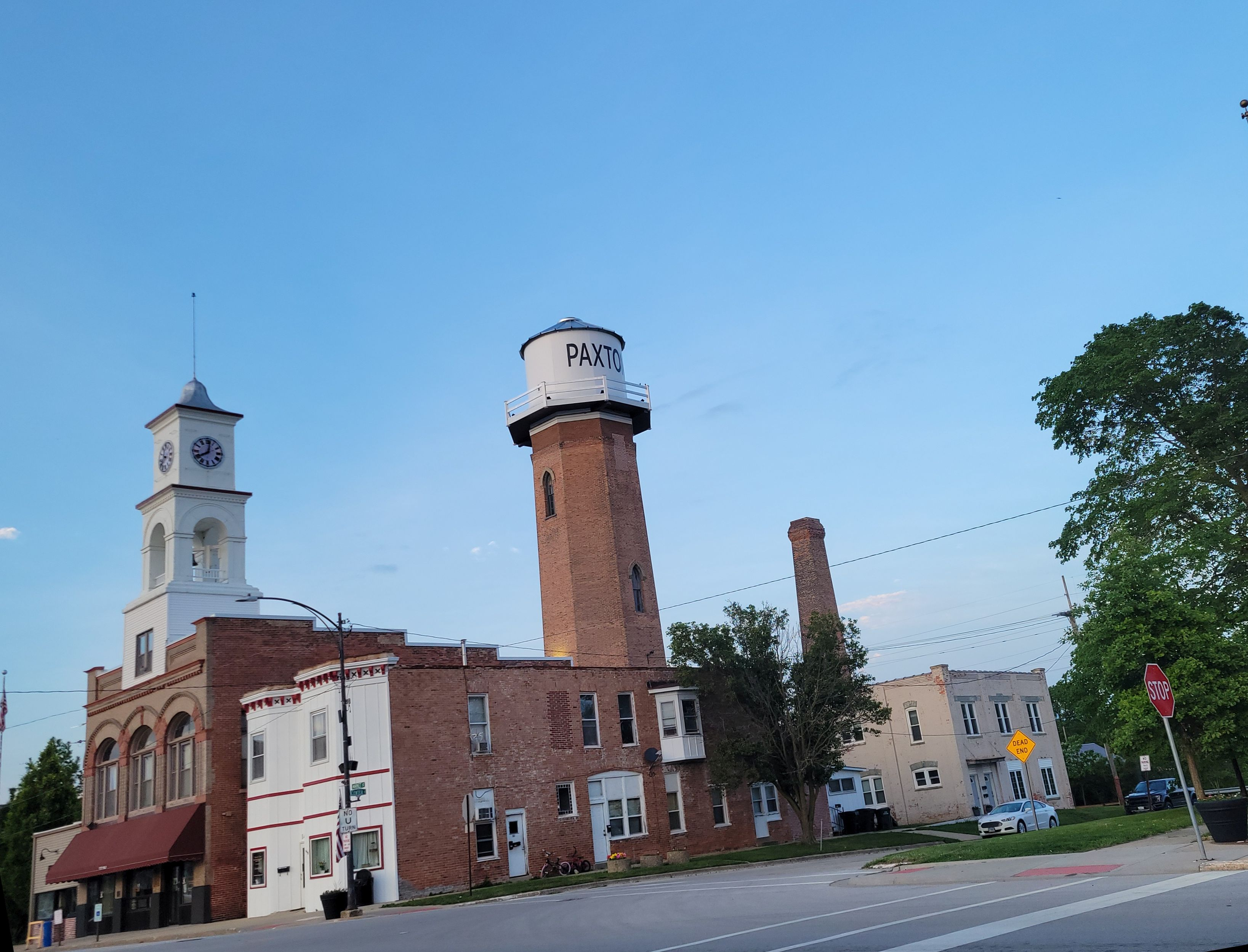
View of water tower from the corner of Market and Center in Paxton in 2026. City hall is the clock tower at left.

== See also ==
- Beloit water tower: NRHP-listed octagonal water tower in Wisconsin
