= John Hackett (Wisconsin politician) =

American politician

John Hackett (January 26, 1808 – February 5, 1886) was an American politician and merchant.

== Biography ==
Born in Vermont, Hackett moved to Wisconsin Territory and settled in Beloit, Wisconsin Territory. He was a merchant and owned a store. He served as Postmaster of Beloit in 1839 and in the Wisconsin Territorial Legislature from 1840 to 1842 as a Democrat. Hackett then served in the first Wisconsin Constitutional Convention. Then in 1852, he served in the Wisconsin State Assembly. He lost a bid to return to that seat in 1853, losing by 224 votes to Samuel Colley, the candidate of the new Republican Party. Hackett was mayor of Beloit, Wisconsin in 1879. He died in Los Angeles, California in 1886, where he had gone because of ill health.

== Legacy ==
His former house, now known as the Lathrop-Munn Cobblestone House, is listed on the National Register of Historic Places.

A Hackett Memorial Horse Trough is located at the southeast corner of West Grand and Bluff, in Field Park, in Beloit.
