= Fairbanks Flats =

- U.S. National Register of Historic Places
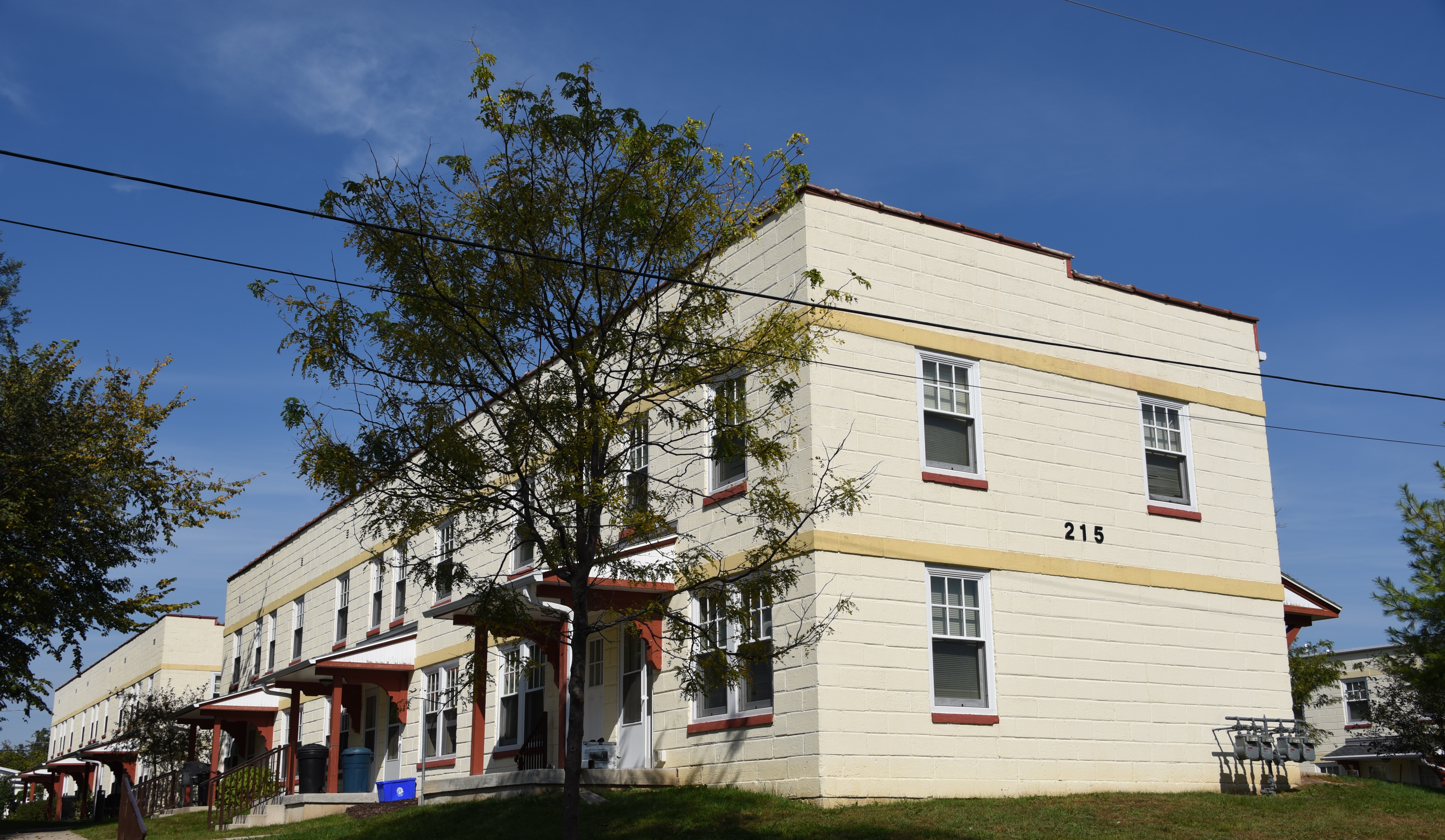

- Location within Wisconsin Location within the United States
- Location: Beloit, Wisconsin
- Coordinates: 42°31′19″N 89°02′24″W
- Built: 1917
- NRHP reference No.: 83003416
- Added to NRHP: January 7, 1983

The Fairbanks Flats are four apartment buildings in Beloit, Wisconsin, built in 1917 by Fairbanks Morse to house black workers arriving from the South. The flats segregated the black families, but also constitute the kernel of Beloit's black community. In 1983, they were added to the National Register of Historic Places.

== History ==
At the start of World War I, Fairbanks-Morse was Beloit's largest employer, producing engines. In 1914, the company began to produce a marine diesel engine, requiring more workers. To meet labor needs, F-M brought in black factory workers, many from the Jim Crow South. Six families came in 1915 - 250 by 1917. Many of the arrivals were unskilled laborers, but there were also blacksmiths, molders, oilers, and a foreman.

The influx of new workers produced a housing shortage and Fairbanks-Morse worked to solve the problem. Its subsidiary Eclipse Home Makers, Inc. bought the land that Fairbanks Flats now occupies on the west side of the Rock River across from the factory and planned the rather plain flats there, aiming to contain "the large number of negroes in one place" on what was then the edge of town. Meanwhile, the company was planning a separate development for its white employees with single-family homes and curved streets - Eclipse Park - designed by New York architect George B. Post. Segregation wasn't a huge concern then, but the purchase of land for Fairbanks Flats was, because F-M snapped it up just before the city planned to acquire it to be part of a city park/boulevard system. Many felt the tract of land was key to the park system, and the city threatened to condemn the land to stop the land deal. The mayor of Beloit warned that the project could create "class bitterness that will be enduring and most undesirable for years to come." Nevertheless, F-M went ahead with its project.

Construction began in late 1917. Four apartment blocks were built - each with six 2-story apartments. Each building has walls of concrete block, shed roofs, and parapets topping the side walls. The double doors in the front middle of each building is sheltered by a canopy. A simple band of protruding block connects the tops of the windows on each story, but otherwise the buildings are not decorated.

In following years, Fairbanks-Morse brought in J.D. Stevenson from Tuskegee Institute to start a YMCA for black youths nearby. The apartments came to be called the Edgewater Flats, but were still administered by F-M officials as late as 1929. Ownership changed after WWII, and people outside of Fairbanks-Morse could rent there. Nevertheless, the Flats remained predominantly black. The NRHP nomination considers the Flats significant as "an example of the role of private corporations in community planning during an era of rapid industrialization" and as "the nucleus of Beloit's twentieth century black community."
