= Jackson J. Bushnell =

American professor (1815–1873)

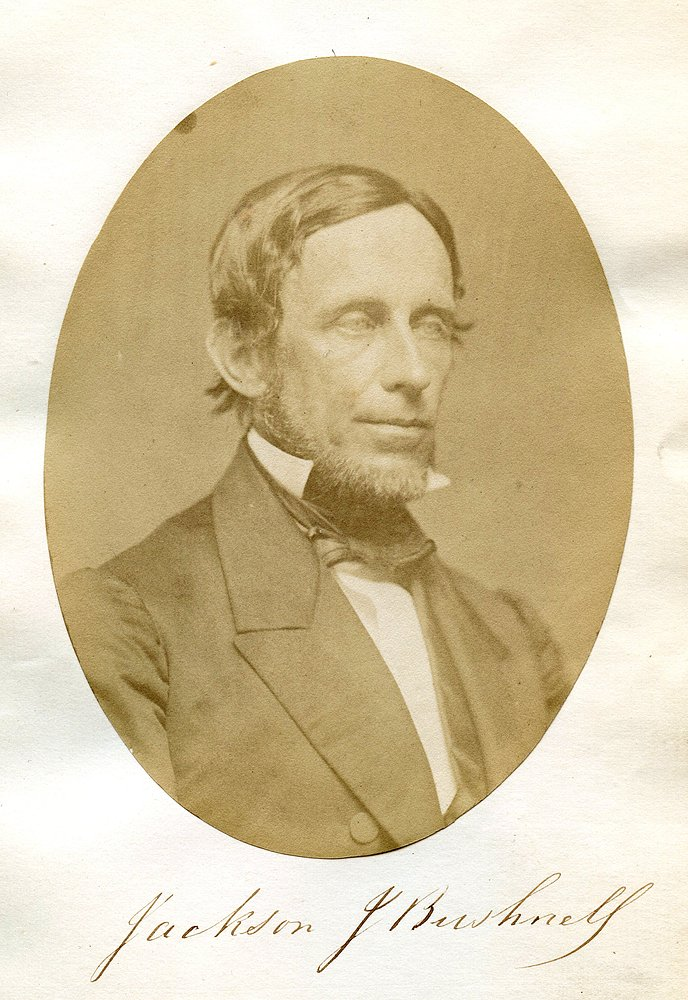
- Portrait of Bushnell
- Born: Jackson Jones Bushnell; February 19, 1815; Old Saybrook, Connecticut, U.S.
- Died: March 8, 1873 (aged 58); Beloit, Wisconsin, U.S.
- Education: Yale College; Andover Theological Seminary
- Occupation: Educaator
- Spouse: Sarah E. Lewis (m. 1854)
- Children: 3

Jackson Jones Bushnell (February 19, 1815 – March 8, 1873) was an American professor.

== Early life ==
Jackson Jones Bushnell was born on February 19, 1815, in Old Saybrook, Connecticut. He was named after Andrew Jackson who gained fame at the Battle of New Orleans a month earlier. At the age of 19, he was clerk of Deep River. He graduated from Yale College in 1841. He entered Andover Theological Seminary in December 1841 and left after a few months.

== Career ==
Bushnell tutored at Western Reserve College in Ohio for two years. He became licensed to preach and was appointed financial agent of the college. He also became an agent of the Western College Society. He remained agent of both until April 1848.

Bushnell was appointed professor of mathematics and natural philosophy in Beloit College in Beloit, Wisconsin. He resigned in 1858 and then focused on business. In 1863, he was re-appointed as professor and continued there until his death. He was financier of the college.

== Personal life ==
Bushnell married Sarah E. Lewis of Southington, Connecticut, in 1854. They had three children.

Bushnell died of typhoid pneumonia on March 8, 1873, at his home in Beloit.
