= National Register of Historic Places listings in Pecos County, Texas =

Location of Pecos County in Texas

This is a list of the National Register of Historic Places listings in Pecos County, Texas.

This is intended to be a complete list of properties and districts listed on the National Register of Historic Places in Pecos County, Texas. There are two districts and one individual property listed on the National Register in the county. One property includes a number of Recorded Texas Historic Landmarks.

This National Park Service list is complete through NPS recent listings posted March 21, 2025.

== Current listings ==
The publicly disclosed locations of National Register properties and districts may be seen in a mapping service provided.

| | Name on the Register | Image | Date listed | Location | City or town | Description |
|---|---|---|---|---|---|---|
| 1 | Canon Ranch Archeological District | Canon Ranch Archeological District | August 11, 1982 (#82004519) | Address restricted | Sheffield | |
| 2 | Canon Ranch Railroad Eclipse Windmill | Canon Ranch Railroad Eclipse Windmill | September 22, 1977 (#77001465) | West of Sheffield on Canon Ranch; 30°44′44″N 101°58′30″W | Sheffield | |
| 3 | Fort Stockton Historic District | Fort Stockton Historic District | April 2, 1973 (#73001971) | E edge of town 30°53′15″N 102°52′32″W | Fort Stockton | Contains Recorded Texas Historic Landmarks |

== See also ==
- National Register of Historic Places listings in Texas
- Recorded Texas Historic Landmarks in Pecos County
