= Canon Ranch Railroad Eclipse Windmill =

- U.S. National Register of Historic Places
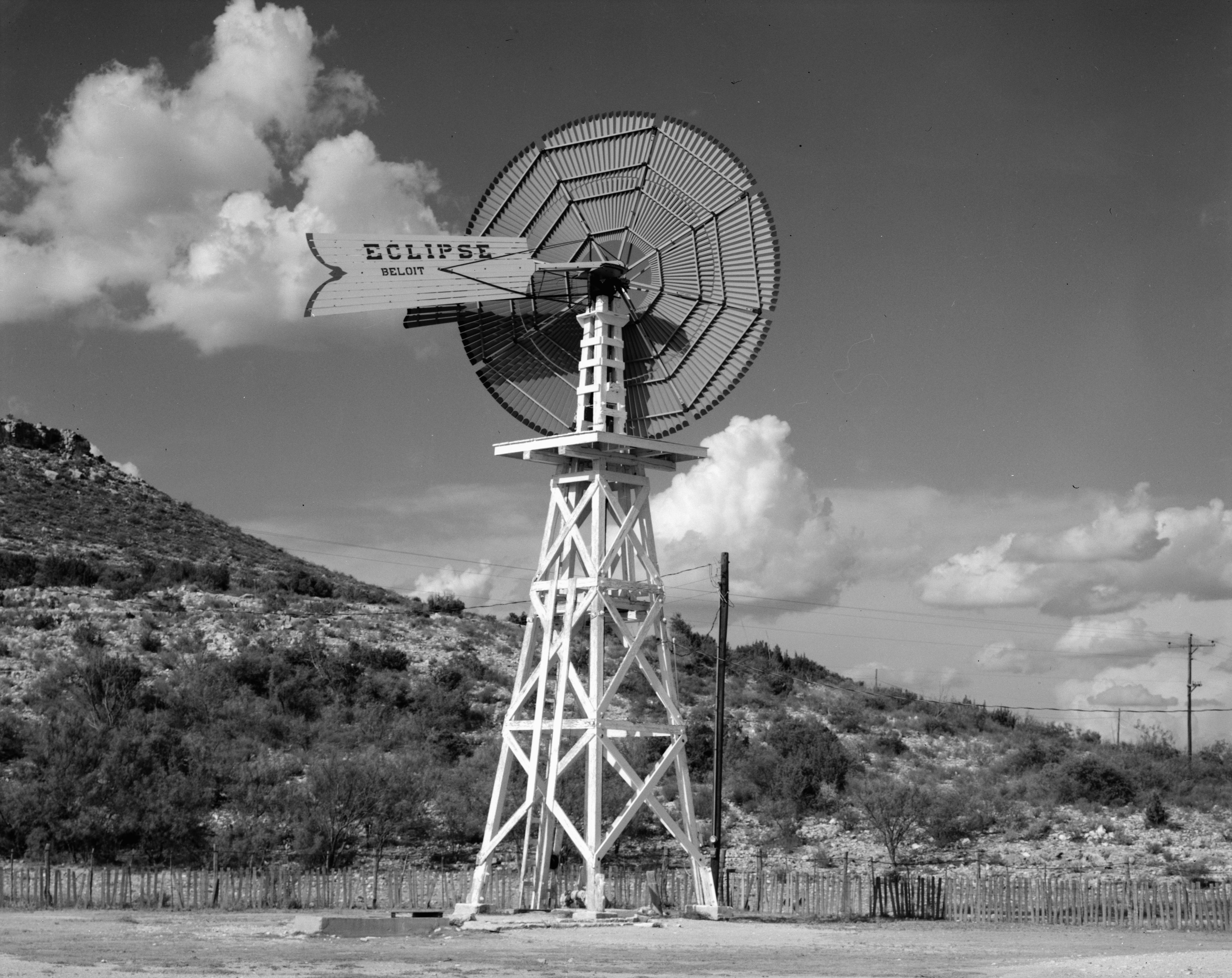
- Windmill as seen in 1984

- Location within Texas Location within the United States
- Location: Pecos County, Texas, USA
- Nearest city: Sheffield, Texas
- Coordinates: 30°44′44″N 101°58′30″W
- Area: 1 acre (0.40 ha)
- Built: 1898
- Built by: William Canon
- NRHP reference No.: 77001465
- Added to NRHP: September 22, 1977

The Canon Ranch Railroad Eclipse Windmill is a historic windpump that was located near Sheffield, Texas.

The windmill was built in 1898 and added to the National Register of Historic Places in 1977. It was one of only four known to exist and was the last one still situated above its original well. It was restored in 2001 by the nationally renowned windmill expert, Jim Collums of Poteet, TX, and his nephew, Woldhagen James. In 2019, the windmill was moved to the National Ranching Heritage Center in Lubbock, Texas for additional restoration and permanent installation in the center's 27-acre historical park.

It is one of few surviving Railroad Eclipse Windmills, which were the largest commercially produced windmills in the U.S. and were used along railway routes in the Southwest. This served as the primary source of water at the headquarters of the Canon Ranch. At 22.5 feet (6.9 m) in diameter, it is the largest size of windmill produced by the Eclipse Company.

== See also ==
- National Register of Historic Places listings in Pecos County, Texas
- Eclipse windmill
- Moriarty Eclipse Windmill
