= Edward F. Hansen =

American politician

Edward F. Hansen was a member of the Wisconsin State Assembly.

== Biography ==
Hansen was born on October 7, 1860, in Beloit, Wisconsin. Jobs he held include machinist. Hansen was affiliated with Congregationalism. On May 29, 1895, he married Carrie A. Ross. He died in November 1929.

His twin brother, William O. Hansen, was also a member of the Assembly.

== Political career ==
Hansen was a member of the Assembly during the 1895 session. Other positions he held include alderman, city treasurer and city clerk of Beloit. He was a Republican.
