= Orsen N. Nielsen =

Former US Diplomat

Orsen N. Nielsen was a United States diplomat.

== Biography ==
Nielsen was born Orsen Norman Nielsen on September 22, 1892 to Eigil and Hilda J Nielsen in Beloit, Wisconsin. He was of Danish descent.

== Career ==
Nielsen served as US Vice Consul in Moscow in 1918 and in Stockholm from 1918 to 1921. He served as US Consul in Berlin from 1921 to 1924; Dublin from 1924 to 1926; and Tehran from 1927 to 1929. Later he was US Consul General in Munich, where he reported on the actions of Germany from 1933 until 1941. He held the same position in Sydney.
