= Pearsons Hall of Science =

- U.S. National Register of Historic Places
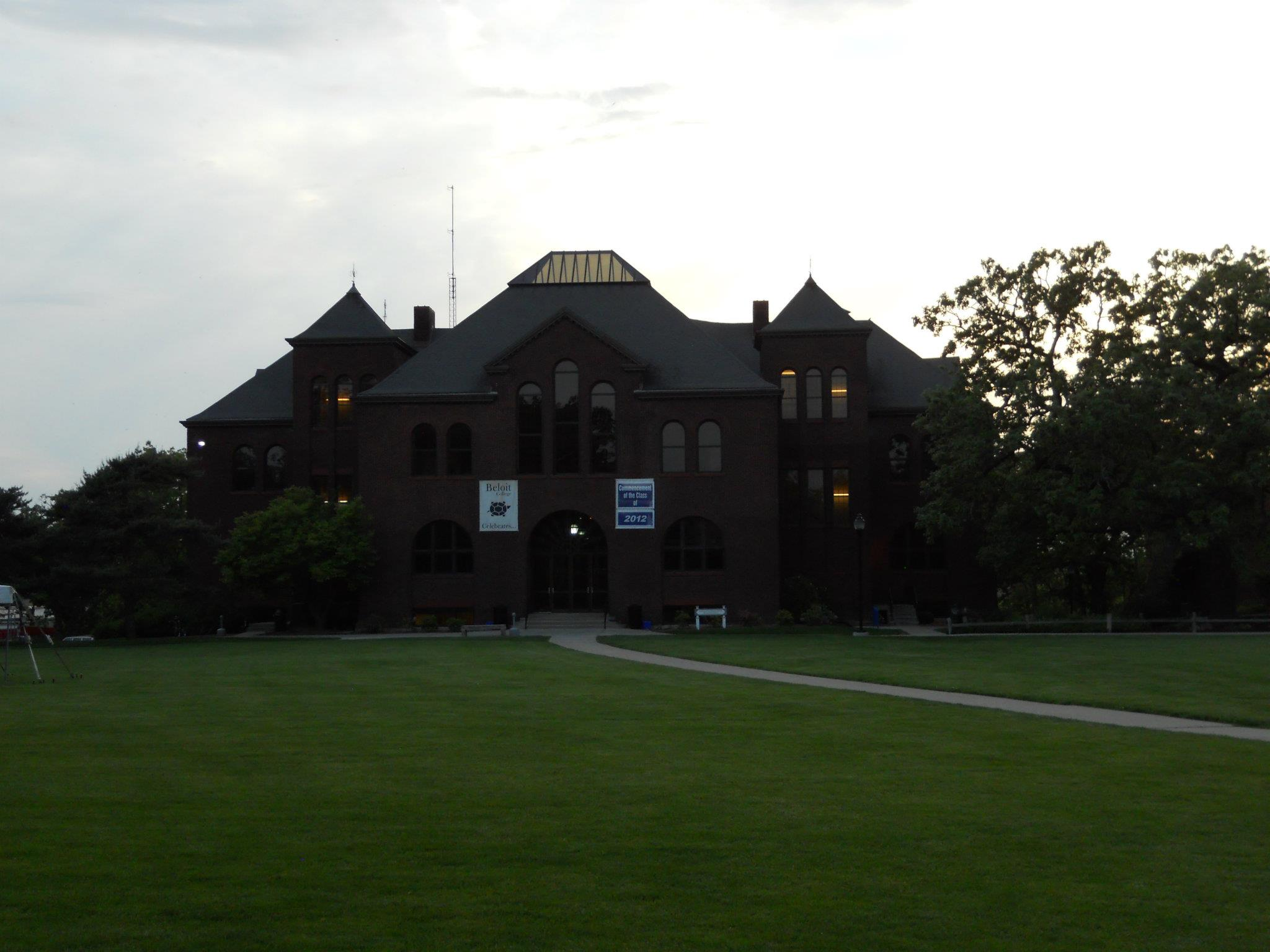
- Pearsons Hall of Science
- Location: Beloit, Wisconsin
- Coordinates: 42.50364°N 89.03173°W
- Built: 1892-1893
- Architect: Daniel Burnham/John Wellborn Root/Edward Ware
- Architectural style: Romanesque Revival
- NRHP reference No.: 80000190
- Added to NRHP: June 30, 1980

The Pearsons Hall of Science was built in 1892 on the campus of Beloit College in Beloit, Wisconsin. It was added to the National Register of Historic Places in 1980 because it was designed by the firm of Daniel Burnham and because it marks an expansion of the science curriculum at the college.

== History ==
The hall was built using funds donated by and named after Dr. D. K. Pearsons, a Quaker man from Pawnee, Illinois. Pearsons had once passed through Beloit on the way to Janesville, Wisconsin and saw the college being built. He was so affected by the sight that it inspired him to donate $100,000 to the school nearly forty years later. The hall was used as the school's science center until 1968.

Currently, the hall houses meeting rooms, dining facilities, student lounges, student service offices, a mailroom, a radio station, a computer and printing lounge, student government, publication offices, and Grace's Place. It was officially renamed the Jeffris-Wood Campus Center, named after attorney and business man Pierpont J. E. Wood and his wife, Helen Jeffris Wood. On campus, it is still generally referred to as Pearsons Hall.

== Renovations ==
Renovations to wiring, plumbing, flooring, ventilation, and equipment occurred in 1931. This renovation also saw the addition of a skylight. A second renovation in 1985 by architect Edward Ware was completed and the building was rededicated as the Jeffris-Wood Campus Center. The bookstore was moved from Smith building to Jeffris-Wood Campus Center after this renovation. In the summer of 2024, the first floor of Pearsons was renovated to reopen DK's, a grab-and-go style dining facility. As of September 2024, the renovations are complete.
