= Moriarty Eclipse Windmill =

- U.S. National Register of Historic Places
- NM State Register of Cultural Properties
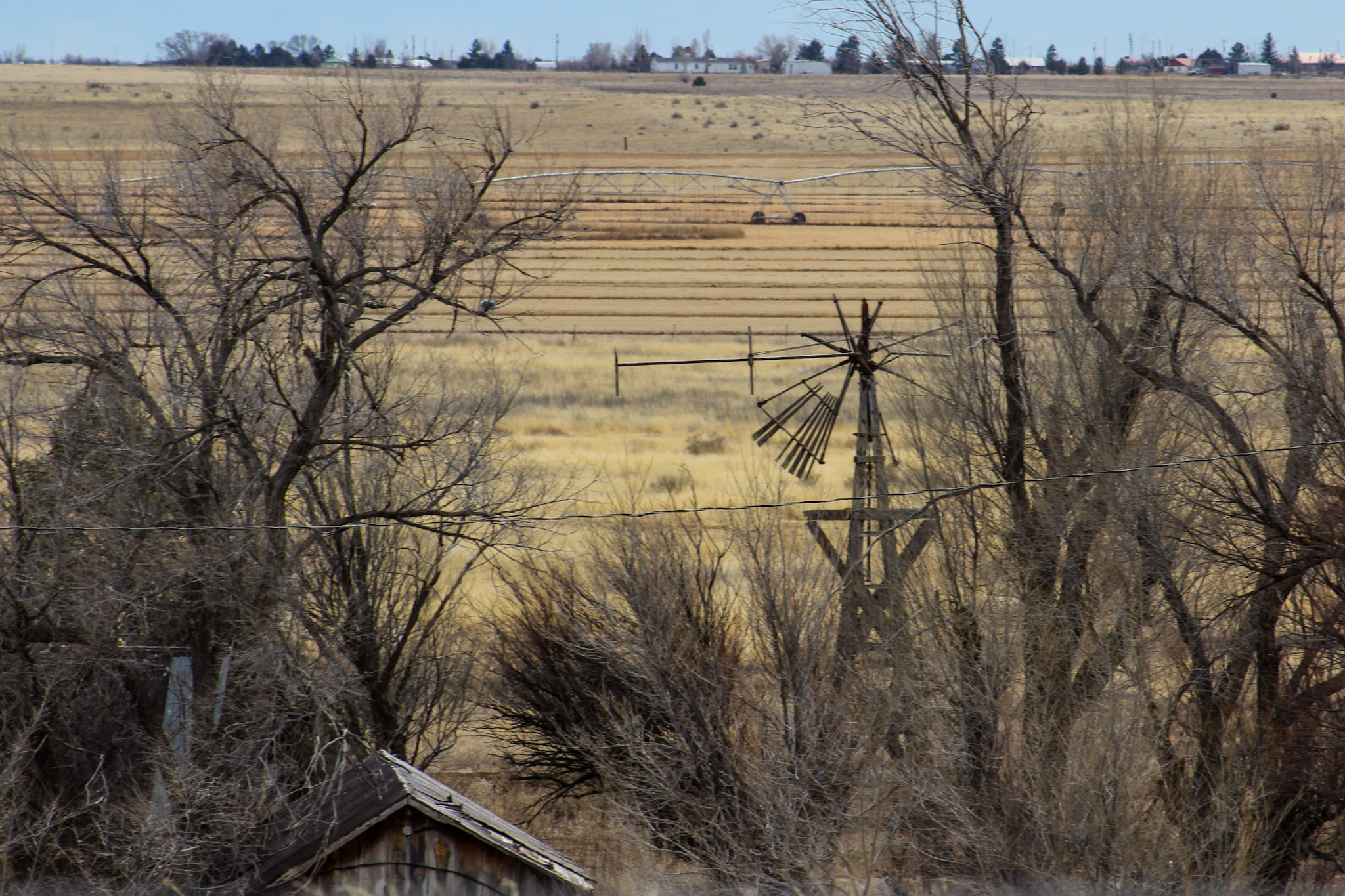

- Location within New Mexico Location within the United States
- Nearest city: Moriarty, New Mexico
- Coordinates: 34°59′43.6″N 106°4′15.2″W
- Area: 1 acre (0.40 ha)
- Built: 1890
- Built by: Eclipse Wind Engine Co.
- NRHP reference No.: 79001561
- NMSRCP No.: 565

Significant dates
- Added to NRHP: June 4, 1979
- Designated NMSRCP: January 20, 1978

The Moriarty Eclipse Windmill is a historic windpump near Moriarty, New Mexico. The windpump was built in 1890 and added to the National Register of Historic Places in 1979.

It was deemed notable as "one of the best preserved historic windmills in New Mexico," although it was not then functioning and was in need of repair.

== See also ==
- Eclipse windmill
- Canon Ranch Railroad Eclipse Windmill
- National Register of Historic Places listings in Torrance County, New Mexico
