= William O. Hansen =

American politician

William O. Hansen was a member of the Wisconsin State Assembly.

== Biography ==
Hansen was born on October 7, 1860, in Beloit, Wisconsin. Jobs he held include blacksmith. In 1889, Hansen married Nellie Gravdale and they would have four children. Hansen and his wife were Lutherans. He died on October 22, 1930.

His twin brother, Edward F. Hansen, was also a member of the Assembly.

== Political career ==
Hansen was elected to the Assembly in 1904. Previously, he had been a Beloit alderman from 1890 to 1892. He was a Republican.
