= Beloit Civic Theatre =

Wisconsin theatre

The Beloit Civic Theatre is a community theatre in Beloit, Wisconsin, U.S.A.

It was founded in 1932. It was originally called the Beloit Little Theatre Guild. By the end of the first season, two plays were performed and the theater had a membership of 250. By the next year, membership had grown to 1300, making it the largest community theater in Wisconsin. In 1948 the theater's name was changed to The Beloit Civic Theatre. Revenue from this theater goes toward a scholarship fund for graduating high school seniors who plan to study the performing arts.

Beloit Civic Theatre holds performances at The Reinholz Theater which is located at 1225 4th Street, in Beloit, Wisconsin.
