= Eclipse windmill =

Windpump design

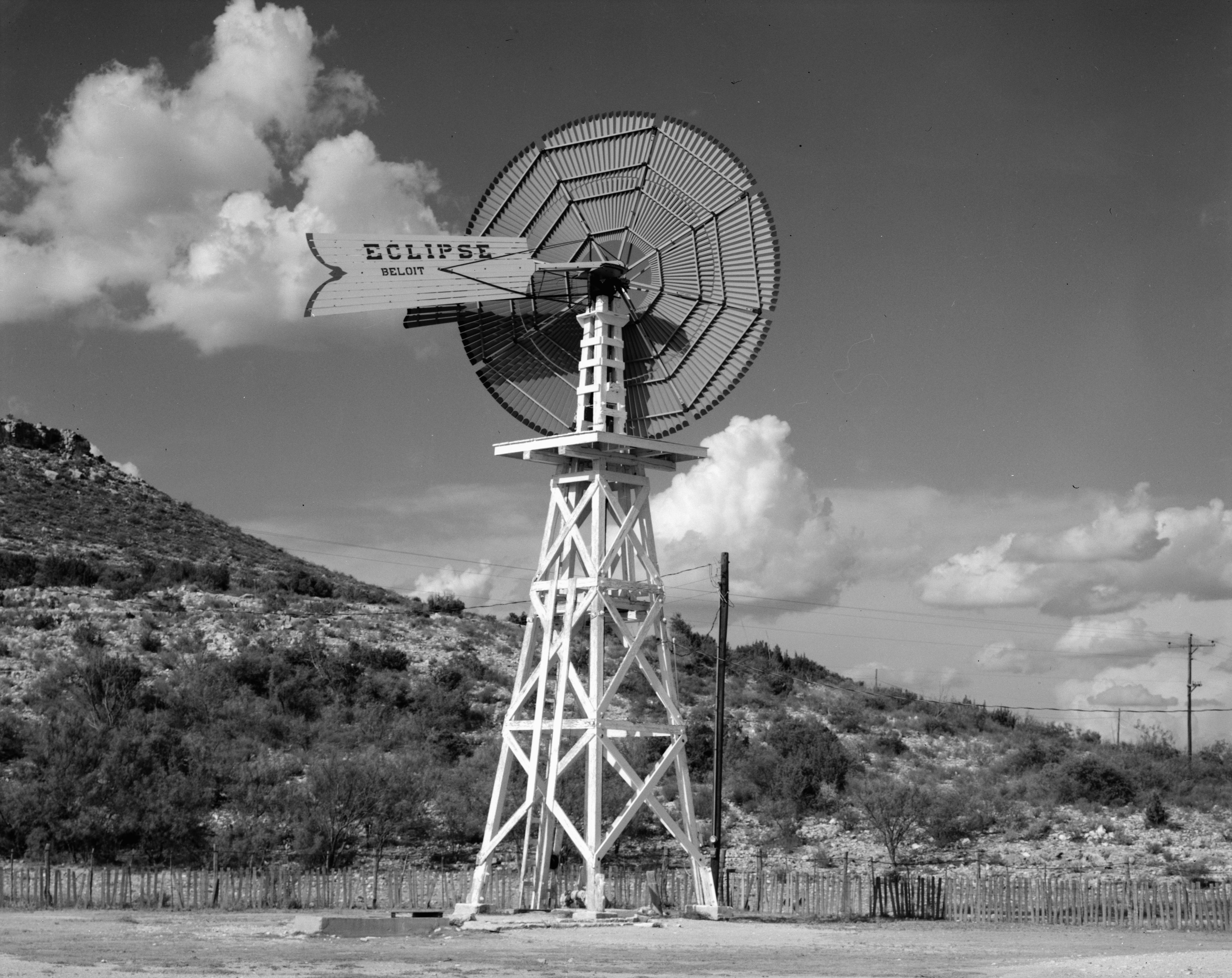
Canon Ranch Railroad Eclipse Windmill

The Eclipse windmill was one of the more successful designs of windmill used to pump water in the nineteenth century United States. It was invented by Leonard Wheeler, a Presbyterian minister who was working among the Ojibwe on the south shore of Lake Superior. Wheeler perfected the device on his missionary homestead over nearly two decades, unknown to the larger technological world. In 1866 health issues forced him to move to Beloit, Wisconsin, then a bustling industrial city, where he was persuaded to patent the basic function of the device. Although Wheeler died before he could witness the success of his invention, his sons carried on the legacy. Some of the companies that succeeded the original Eclipse Windmill Company remain viable in the 21st century.

== Leonard Wheeler ==
Leonard Hemenway Wheeler
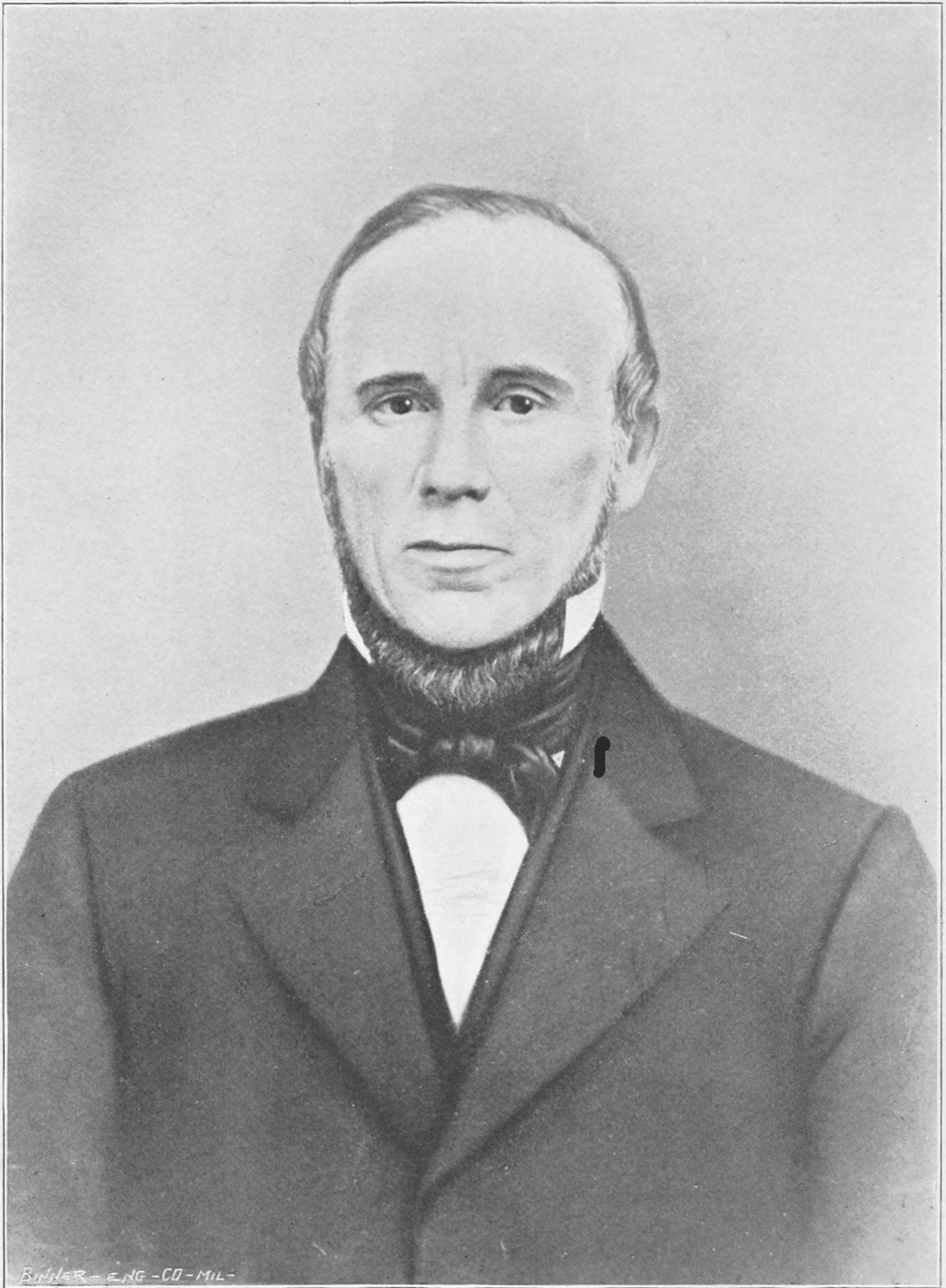
- Born: April 18, 1811; Shrewsbury, Massachusetts
- Died: February 25, 1872 (aged 60); Beloit, Wisconsin
- Occupation: Presbyterian minister
- Known for: Missionary among Ojibwe, windmill inventor

Leonard Hemenway Wheeler was born in Shrewsbury, Massachusetts, on April 18, 1811. His mother died when he was one month old. He was raised by his father and an aunt in Bridport, Vermont. He attended college at Middlebury College, where he graduated in 1837, and Andover Theological Seminary, where he graduated in 1840. Around this time he met and married Harriet Wood, similarly devout in her religious beliefs. Since Leonard was already committed to missionary work among the Ojibwe, the couple soon found themselves setting up a household at La Pointe, Wisconsin on Madeline Island in Wisconsin Territory.

Wheeler eventually became committed to the notion of helping the Ojibwe learn the agricultural skills needed to sustain themselves, especially since the fur trade, upon which they had been economically dependent for several generations, was declining dramatically. The island was not conducive to farming, so Wheeler moved to the mainland, and established a home and mission, naming it Odanah, the Ojibwe word for village. Many Ojibwe (there were around 1000 in the Chequamegon Bay region) were already semi-permanent residents of that location, because of wild rice fields at the mouth of the Bad River. The Ojibwe name of the location was Kietiganing.

Wheeler originally built his first windmill for the purpose of pumping water out of a deep ravine up to his home. He continually improved it over time, and it was eventually used for a variety of farming purposes such as grinding corn.

The hard winter life in the far north woods eventually took a toll on Wheeler. In 1866 he moved his family to Beloit, where many of his professional colleagues lived and where he was able to find friendship and support for his family while he sought out an alternative career.

== Patenting of the device ==
After moving to Beloit a cousin from Indiana, Samuel Chipman, became interested in Wheeler's windmill. Chipman persuaded Wheeler to work on a patent and provided financial support while Wheeler did so. On September 10, 1867, US Patent No, 68674 was issued. The patent had three claims.

The principal claim was for a regulating mechanism to keep wheel pointed at an optimum angle based on both the wind speed and direction. The main design problem for windmills is to capture as much power as possible in light wind, but not be damaged or destroyed by high-speed winds. In prior art, windmills had a simple tail vane which kept the wheel pointed directly at the wind, a simple design still in use in decorative garden windmills. Wheeler developed a mechanism that pointed the wheel into the wind at low to moderate wind speeds, but turned the wheel to point obliquely to the wind at high speeds. This was accomplished by the means of a secondary vane which shifted angles, held in an optimum position by weights through a series of pulleys. which operated against the main directional vane to optimize the angle.

An additional benefit to Wheeler's invention, which became second patent claim, was that by a simple shift in one of the hanging weights the motion of the wheel could be stopped altogether. His third claim was for a means by which to mount the vertical axis for the entire mechanism with a hollow shaft so that the ropes operating the regulating pulleys could pass down to the weights without restricting the rotational angle of the platform.

In an 1868 letter to his elderly father (still in Vermont), Wheeler described the device and his hopes for it this way:

You will like to know, perhaps, how I succeeded with the mill. I have spent a good deal of time on it, experimenting and getting it into good shape. It now suits, so far as the general plan of it is concerned. Two points have especially engaged my attention: 1: To get the mill so as to run nicely. 2 : To simplify and improve the construction of it, so that it will be strong and cheaply built. I have, as yet, put up but two hundred-dollar mills, both of which drive pumps in wells fifty feet deep, and give good satisfaction. Practical mechanics and machinists are much pleased with it, — it is so simple in its construction and accomplishes such important ends. It is self-regulating and will take care of itself in any wind, however gusty and strong it may blow. For deep wells on our prairies to raise water for watering stock, it is a mill, we think, which will be much wanted. It is not yet remunerative, the balance has been out of pocket thus far, but I hope the scale will turn it my favor before long. I suffer, as many inventors do, in not having the means to bring it rapidly into notice. But, as in every new thing, we must be contented to move slowly and wait patiently for results. The mill in its present form, is used only to work pumps. I hope soon to get up another form for driving machinery. I feel quite confident I can get one up in a shape that will give better satisfaction than anything now out, though it must be confessed there are not a few difficulties in the way. So you see I continue to keep busy, and, having something of the versatility common to the Yankees, if I can not do one thing I turn my hand to another. I shall never be able to preach any more, but if I can get up a useful mill and provide for the wants of my family, one part of the end of life will be answered.

As Wheeler mentions in the letter, a key aspect of his device, although not part of the patent, was the use of inexpensive interchangeable parts, lowering the overall manufacturing costs.

== Growth of company ==
At first the windmill was manufactured by L. H. Wheeler and Sons. In February 1872 Wheeler died. In 1873 Wheeler's sons, along with S. T. Merrill and C. B. Salmon, organized the Eclipse Wind Mill Company and the company began to grow steadily. At first the wheel design used four vanes, but this was changed to a wheel with a dense pattern of fins, a signature of the Eclipse, and was manufactured in several diameters from 8 1/2 to 14 feet.

=== Philadelphia Exhibition of 1876 ===
The Centennial International Exhibition of 1876, the first official World's Fair in the United States, was held in Philadelphia, Pennsylvania, from May 10 to November 10, 1876, to celebrate the 100th anniversary of the signing of the Declaration of Independence in Philadelphia. About 10 million visitors attended, equivalent to about 20% of the population of the United States at the time. Hundreds of machines and devices were exhibited, including a special exhibit of windmills, among which were three models by Eclipse as well as by the United States Wind-Engine & Pump Company (Batavia, Illinois), E. Stover & Brothers (Freeport, Illinois) and Gammon & Deering (Chicago, Illinois). The Eclipse windmill received the following citation:

Commended as a thoroughly efficient, well-made engine, economical in work. We find a strong solid wheel varying in size from ten feet to sixteen feet diameter. The special claim is for a small controllable side vane, which acts as an overbalance and draws the sail away from the wind in a storm. It is prevented from acting unfavorably in a light wind, because it must first overcome the leverage of a weighted arm, which can be made adjustable by moving the weight nearer or farther from the centre. The turn-table travels on four friction balls running on a grooved surface. Table casting is made in one piece with the cap or bed plate, and has flanges on under side to receive the heads of the posts. The end of the piston-rod has a ball attachment which keeps it in place. There is no method for taking up the wear of this ball.

=== Expansion of Beloit factories ===
In 1880 Merrill and Salmon retired, and the company was renamed the Eclipse Wind Engine Company, with W. H. Wheeler as president. Twice thereafter the manufacturing plant was rebuilt, and Wheeler added friction clutch and gas engine products.

=== Merge with Fairbanks Scales ===
In the early 1890s, Charles Morse bought shares in the Eclipse Wind Engine Company. Eventually Morse merged the interests of Eclipse with those of the Fairbanks Company as well as other enterprises, organizing the combined company known as Fairbanks, Morse & Co.

At the turn of the 20th century, the products of Fairbanks, Morse & Co., including the various models of the Eclipse Windmill, were sold all over the world. Eclipse windmills at the time were one of the top two brands in the United States and were also manufactured extensively in Germany. When the patent rights expired in 1901, many competing windmill companies copied the design.

After World War I, the Fairbanks Morse company no longer manufactured the classic wood-fin Eclipse. However, they did produce several steel windmills that carried the Eclipse brand name.

== Antique and historical versions of the Eclipse ==
Eclipse windmills are restored and protected by preservationists, two examples being:

- Moriarty Eclipse Windmill
- Canon Ranch Railroad Eclipse Windmill
