= Lathrop-Munn Cobblestone House =

Historic house in Wisconsin, United States

- U.S. National Register of Historic Places
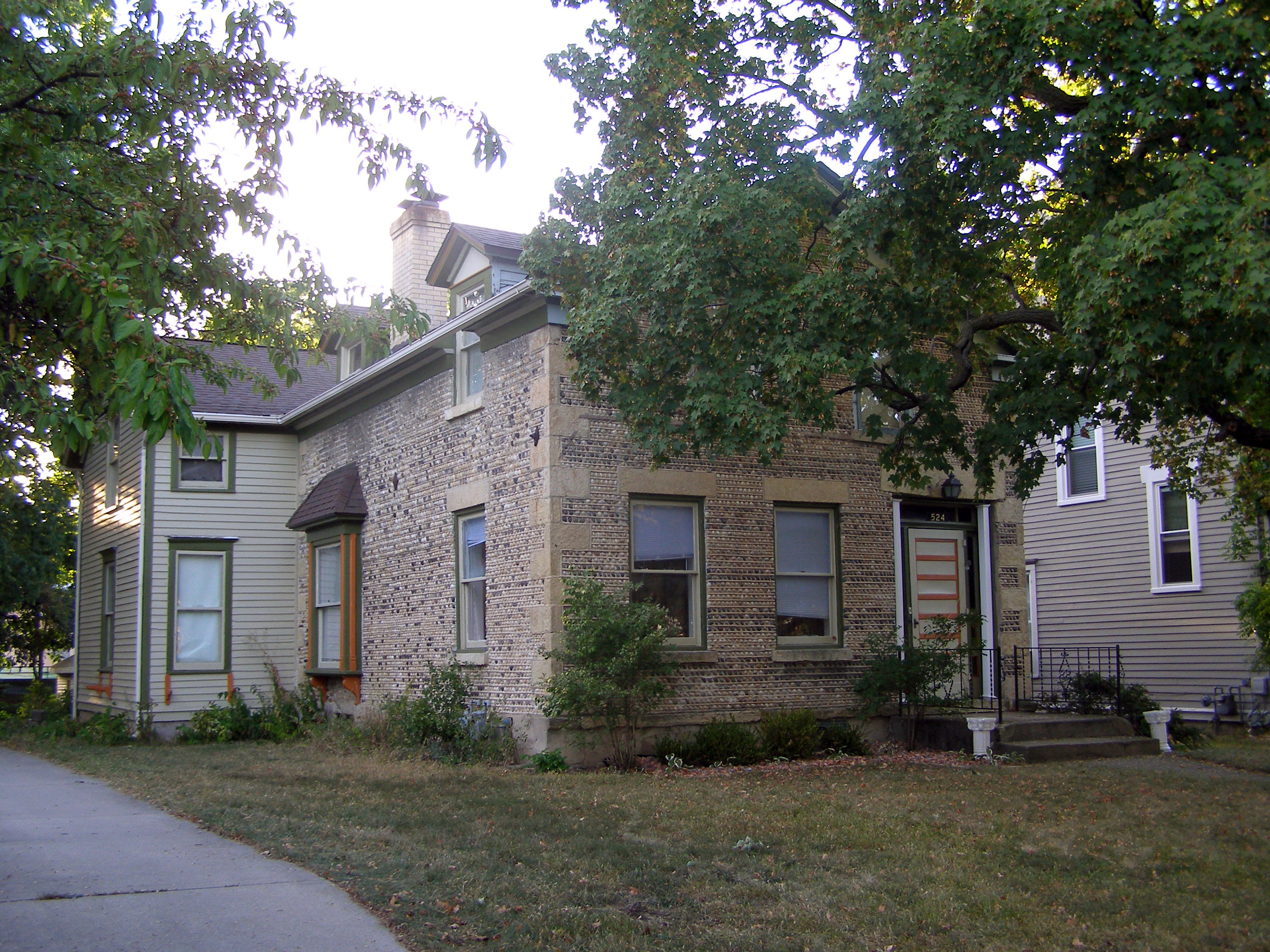
- Lathrop-Munn Cobblestone House
- Location: 524 Bluff St., Beloit, Wisconsin
- Coordinates: 42°30′03″N 89°02′31″W
- Area: 0.2 acres (0.081 ha)
- Architectural style: Greek Revival
- MPS: Cobblestone Buildings of Rock County TR (AD)
- NRHP reference No.: 77000051
- Added to NRHP: August 22, 1977

The Lathrop-Munn Cobblestone House is a 1.5-story Greek Revival-styled house built about 1848 in Beloit, Wisconsin, striking for the care with which the mason arranged the tiny cobbles. In 1977 the building was placed on the National Register of Historic Places.

John Hackett was one of the first permanent settlers in Beloit - the first storekeeper and postmaster. He developed Hackett's Addition, the neighborhood in which the house stands, and he owned the lot on which the house was built. It's unclear if the house was there when Hackett sold the lot to Frederick A Lathrop in 1848.

Regardless, the house was striking and up-scale. The style is Greek Revival, seen in the low pitch of the roof, the frieze board beneath the eaves, the cornice returns, and the simple straight limestone lintels above the windows. This was a common style for fine houses in Wisconsin in the mid-1800s. What is unusual is the cobblestone cladding - small stones rounded by wave action - and above that the care with which these stones are set. Especially on the front, they are laid in rows, and carefully matched for size within each row. Beyond that, they are matched for color, so that four rows of light-colored stones alternate with four rows of darker stones, producing faint alternating bands - a pleasing effect. Inside, the walls are plastered.

Frederick Lathrop owned the house until 1864. Around the 1870s the frame wing was added at the rear of the house. Other early owners were an inventor and a physician, and later a plumber.

The NRHP nomination considers this house "one of the two best preserved cobblestone houses remaining in the city of Beloit."
