= Beloit, Wisconsin =

- City
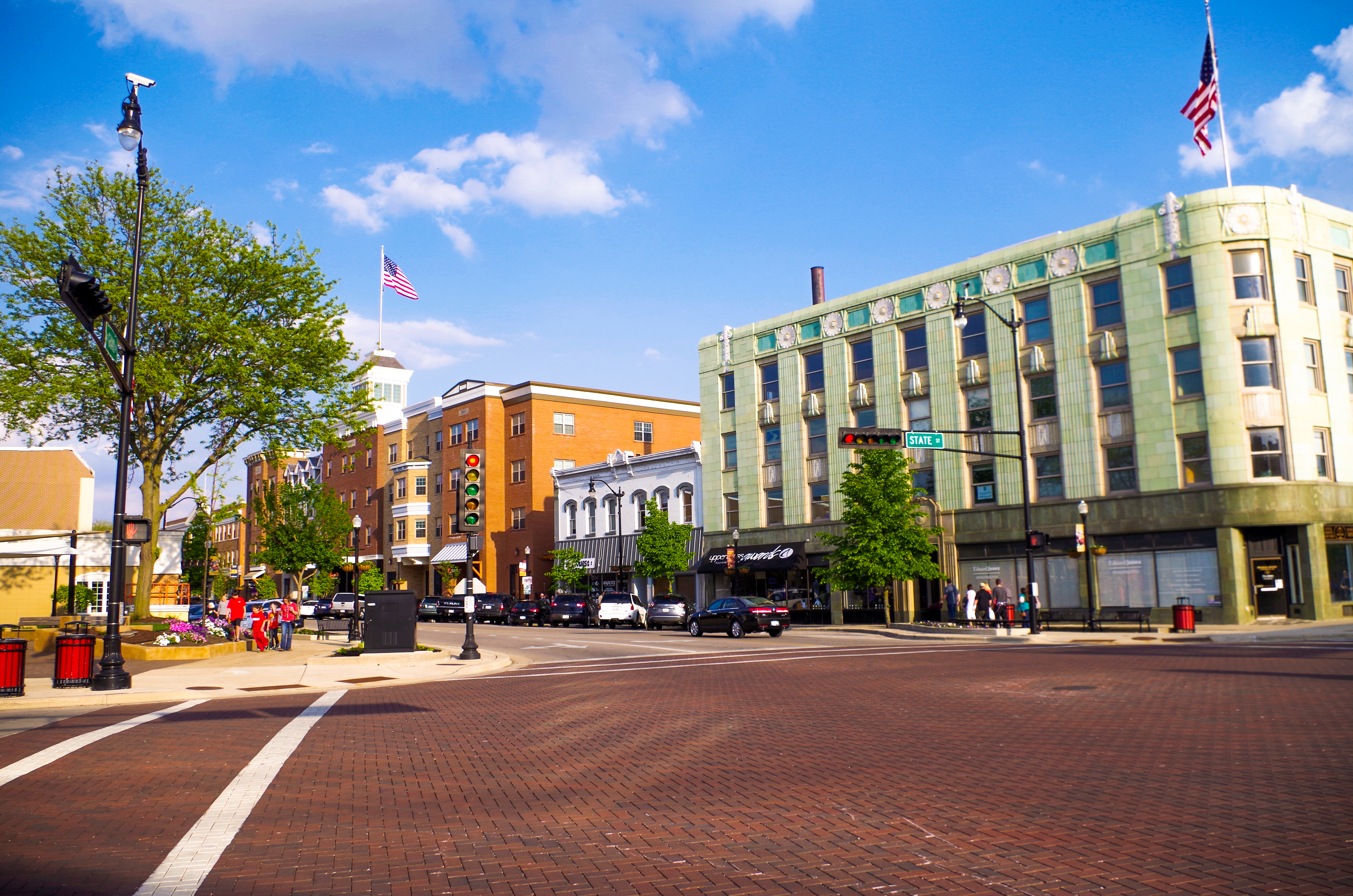
- Downtown Beloit

- Flag
- Nickname: "Gateway To Wisconsin"
- Interactive map of Beloit, Wisconsin
- Location within Wisconsin Location within the United States
- Coordinates: 42°30′30″N 89°01′54″W
- Country: United States
- State: Wisconsin
- County: Rock
- Founded: 1836
- Incorporated: February 24, 1846 (village); March 31, 1856 (city)

Government
  - City manager: Daniel Ortiz Hernandez

Area
  - City: 17.66 sq mi (45.73 km^{2})
  - Land: 17.33 sq mi (44.89 km^{2})
  - Water: 0.32 sq mi (0.84 km^{2})
- Elevation: 751 ft (228.9 m)

Population (2020)
  - City: 36,657
  - Density: 2,115/sq mi (817/km^{2})
  - Metro: 163,687
- Time zone: UTC-6 (CST)
  - Summer (DST): UTC-5 (CDT)
- ZIP Code(s): 53511, 53512
- Area codes: 608, 353
- FIPS code: 55-06500
- Website: beloitwi.gov

Beloit (/bəˈlɔɪt/ bə-LOYT) is a city in Rock County, Wisconsin, United States. It is located along the Rock River in southern Wisconsin, on the state border with Illinois. The population was 36,657 at the 2020 census. The Janesville–Beloit metropolitan statistical area, consisting solely of Rock County, has an estimated 165,000 residents.

== History ==
Postcard of Carnegie Beloit Public Library, Beloit, Wis.

Twelve men in Colebrook, New Hampshire created the "New England Emigrating Company" in October 1836, and sent Horace White to find a suitable region of Wisconsin in which to settle. The level fields and the water power of Turtle Creek and "unlimited gravel" in the area around what is now Beloit fixed the site of the village and farms. White purchased the land. At the same time as the Colebrook settlers, six families from Bedford, New Hampshire, arrived and settled in the region. They said the Rock River Valley had a "New England look" that made them feel at home. The village was platted in 1838 and was planned with wide streets, building on the New England model.

Beloit was originally named New Albany (after Albany, Vermont) in 1837 by its founder, Caleb Blodgett. The name was changed to Beloit in 1838. The name was coined to be reminiscent of Detroit.

Beloit lays claim to such inventions as the speedometer, John Francis Appleby's twine binder, and Korn Kurls, which resemble Cheetos, and the original puffed cheese snack.

=== Railroad heritage ===
Beloit was served by the Milwaukee Road, and the Chicago & North Western Railroad (C&NW). In its 1980 bankruptcy, the Milwaukee Road disposed of the Southwestern Line. The Union Pacific, which took over the C&NW, operates in Beloit today over a remnant of the former Milwaukee Road, providing a rail connection to Fairbanks-Morse Engine manufacturing facility. The CPKC operates other trackage in Beloit. The city also had an electric interurban railroad.

== Geography ==
According to the United States Census Bureau, the city has an area of 17.66 square miles (45.74 km^{2}), of which 17.33 square miles (44.88 km^{2}) is land and 0.33 square miles (0.85 km^{2}) is water. Location: 42°30′30″N 89°01′54″W.

=== Climate ===
Beloit

Climate chart (precipitation, max. and min. temperature)
J	F	M	A	M	J	J	A	S	O	N	D
104 −6 −11	90 −4 −12	63 9 −5	155 19 3	96 24 9	168 28 15	87 27 18	113 25 16	67 24 13	89 15 6	58 8 −1	68 −3 −12
- █ Average max. and min. temperatures in °C
- █ Precipitation totals in mm
Imperial conversion
J	F	M	A	M	J	J	A	S	O	N	D
4.1 21 12	3.5 25 10	2.5 48 23	6.1 66 37	3.8 75 48	6.6 82 59	3.4 81 64	4.4 77 61	2.6 75 55	3.5 59 43	2.3 46 30	2.7 27 10
- █ Average max. and min. temperatures in °F
- █ Precipitation totals in inches

Climate data for Beloit, Wisconsin (1991–2020 normals, extremes 1893–present)
Month	Jan	Feb	Mar	Apr	May	Jun	Jul	Aug	Sep	Oct	Nov	Dec	Year
Record high °F (°C)	61 (16)	69 (21)	84 (29)	92 (33)	103 (39)	104 (40)	110 (43)	102 (39)	100 (38)	89 (32)	78 (26)	67 (19)	110 (43)
Mean maximum °F (°C)	48.7 (9.3)	52.6 (11.4)	67.6 (19.8)	78.7 (25.9)	86.3 (30.2)	91.2 (32.9)	92.0 (33.3)	91.2 (32.9)	88.3 (31.3)	81.1 (27.3)	65.9 (18.8)	52.1 (11.2)	94.1 (34.5)
Mean daily maximum °F (°C)	25.1 (−3.8)	29.4 (−1.4)	41.5 (5.3)	54.8 (12.7)	66.5 (19.2)	76.1 (24.5)	79.6 (26.4)	78.0 (25.6)	71.3 (21.8)	58.3 (14.6)	43.2 (6.2)	30.5 (−0.8)	54.5 (12.5)
Daily mean °F (°C)	17.9 (−7.8)	21.6 (−5.8)	32.7 (0.4)	44.6 (7.0)	56.1 (13.4)	65.9 (18.8)	69.7 (20.9)	68.1 (20.1)	60.8 (16.0)	48.5 (9.2)	35.3 (1.8)	23.8 (−4.6)	45.4 (7.4)
Mean daily minimum °F (°C)	10.7 (−11.8)	13.9 (−10.1)	23.8 (−4.6)	34.4 (1.3)	45.7 (7.6)	55.8 (13.2)	59.8 (15.4)	58.1 (14.5)	50.3 (10.2)	38.7 (3.7)	27.4 (−2.6)	17.0 (−8.3)	36.3 (2.4)
Mean minimum °F (°C)	−8.7 (−22.6)	−3.6 (−19.8)	6.6 (−14.1)	23.8 (−4.6)	34.9 (1.6)	45.4 (7.4)	52.5 (11.4)	51.5 (10.8)	38.9 (3.8)	27.3 (−2.6)	14.2 (−9.9)	−0.8 (−18.2)	−12.6 (−24.8)
Record low °F (°C)	−29 (−34)	−28 (−33)	−13 (−25)	7 (−14)	26 (−3)	34 (1)	42 (6)	39 (4)	23 (−5)	4 (−16)	−12 (−24)	−25 (−32)	−29 (−34)
Average precipitation inches (mm)	1.60 (41)	1.52 (39)	2.13 (54)	3.72 (94)	4.34 (110)	5.64 (143)	3.36 (85)	4.14 (105)	3.83 (97)	2.77 (70)	2.40 (61)	1.96 (50)	37.41 (950)
Average snowfall inches (cm)	9.8 (25)	7.3 (19)	4.3 (11)	1.1 (2.8)	0.0 (0.0)	0.0 (0.0)	0.0 (0.0)	0.0 (0.0)	0.0 (0.0)	0.2 (0.51)	2.7 (6.9)	10.2 (26)	35.6 (90)
Average precipitation days (≥ 0.01 in)	8.7	7.1	8.4	10.3	11.7	10.6	8.9	8.7	7.6	9.1	8.0	8.6	107.7
Average snowy days (≥ 0.1 in)	6.2	4.5	2.3	0.6	0.0	0.0	0.0	0.0	0.0	0.1	0.8	4.6	19.1
Source: NOAA

== Demographics ==
Historical population
Census	Pop.	Note	%±
1860	4,098		—
1870	4,396		7.3%
1880	4,790		9.0%
1890	6,315		31.8%
1900	10,436		65.3%
1910	15,125		44.9%
1920	21,284		40.7%
1930	23,611		10.9%
1940	25,365		7.4%
1950	29,590		16.7%
1960	32,846		11.0%
1970	35,729		8.8%
1980	35,207		−1.5%
1990	35,573		1.0%
2000	35,775		0.6%
2010	36,966		3.3%
2020	36,657		−0.8%
U.S. Decennial Census

=== Racial and ethnic composition ===
Beloit city, Wisconsin – Racial and ethnic composition Note: the US Census treats Hispanic/Latino as an ethnic category. This table excludes Latinos from the racial categories and assigns them to a separate category. Hispanics/Latinos may be of any race.
Race / Ethnicity (NH = Non-Hispanic)	Pop 2000	Pop 2010	Pop 2020	% 2000	% 2010	% 2020
White alone (NH)	25,732	23,485	20,638	71.93%	63.53%	56.30%
Black or African American alone (NH)	5,428	5,440	5,169	15.17%	14.72%	14.10%
Native American or Alaska Native alone (NH)	111	114	109	0.31%	0.31%	0.30%
Asian alone (NH)	410	409	587	1.15%	1.11%	1.60%
Native Hawaiian or Pacific Islander alone (NH)	18	9	21	0.05%	0.02%	0.06%
Other race alone (NH)	73	53	211	0.20%	0.14%	0.58%
Mixed race or Multiracial (NH)	746	1,124	2,110	2.09%	3.04%	5.76%
Hispanic or Latino (any race)	3,257	6,332	7,812	9.10%	17.13%	21.31%
Total	35,775	36,966	36,657	100.00%	100.00%	100.00%

=== 2020 census ===
As of the 2020 census, Beloit had a population of 36,657 and a population density of 2,115.0 inhabitants per square mile (816.6/km^{2}).

The median age was 35.3 years. 25.0% of residents were under the age of 18 and 14.4% of residents were 65 years of age or older. For every 100 females there were 93.7 males, and for every 100 females age 18 and over there were 90.7 males age 18 and over.

98.8% of residents lived in urban areas, while 1.2% lived in rural areas.

There were 14,068 households in Beloit, of which 32.5% had children under the age of 18 living in them. Of all households, 35.1% were married-couple households, 21.1% were households with a male householder and no spouse or partner present, and 33.5% were households with a female householder and no spouse or partner present. About 31.8% of all households were made up of individuals and 12.2% had someone living alone who was 65 years of age or older.

There were 15,068 housing units at an average density of 869.4 per square mile (335.7/km^{2}), of which 6.6% were vacant. The homeowner vacancy rate was 1.6% and the rental vacancy rate was 5.5%.

Racial composition as of the 2020 census
Race	Number	Percent
White	21,995	60.0%
Black or African American	5,333	14.5%
American Indian and Alaska Native	381	1.0%
Asian	592	1.6%
Native Hawaiian and Other Pacific Islander	23	0.1%
Some other race	4,173	11.4%
Two or more races	4,160	11.3%

=== 2010 census ===
As of the census of 2010, there were 36,966 people, 13,781 households, and 8,867 families residing in the city. The population density was 2,128.2 inhabitants per square mile (821.7/km^{2}). There were 15,177 housing units at an average density of 873.7 per square mile (337.3/km^{2}). The racial makeup of the city was 68.9% White, 15.1% African American, 0.4% Native American, 1.1% Asian, 10.0% from other races, and 4.4% from two or more races. Hispanic or Latino of any race were 17.1% of the population.

There were 13,781 households, of which 36.5% had children under the age of 18 living with them, 39.6% were married couples living together, 18.3% had a female householder with no husband present, 6.4% had a male householder with no wife present, and 35.7% were non-families. 29.4% of all households were made up of individuals, and 11.2% had someone living alone who was 65 years of age or older. The average household size was 2.57 and the average family size was 3.16.

The median age in the city was 33.1 years. 27.1% of residents were under the age of 18; 12.1% were between the ages of 18 and 24; 25.7% were from 25 to 44; 23.1% were from 45 to 64; 12% were 65 years of age or older. The gender makeup of the city was 47.9% male and 52.1% female.

== Economy ==
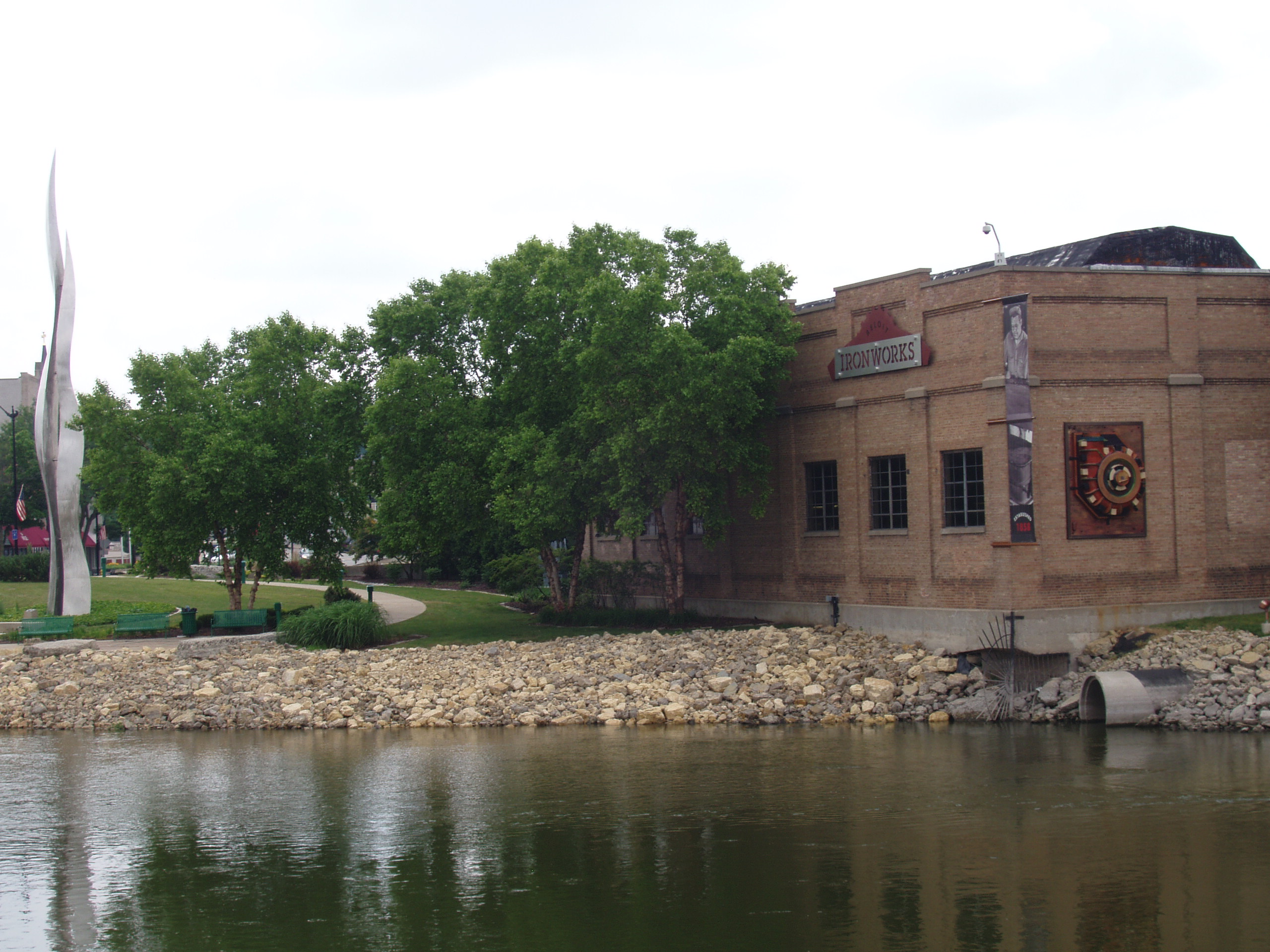
Beloit Ironworks, a group of restored industrial buildings along the city's downtown riverfront

Industries with headquarters in Beloit include ABC Supply Company, Bio-Systems International, Broaster Company, Fairbanks-Morse Defense, Hendricks Holding Company, Murmac Paint Manufacturing, PlayMonster, and Regal Beloit.

Downtown Beloit is a dense cluster of mostly small shops and boutiques. The area has been recognized for increased investment and renewal since the 1990s. Downtown Beloit is one of two inaugural members of the Wisconsin Main Street designation. Upscale downtown condominiums and hotels were introduced after 2000 with the construction of the Hotel Hilton Apartments (2001), the Beloit Inn (now the Ironworks Hotel, 2003), Heritage View (2005), Phoenix Project (2013), Hotel Goodwin (2018), and the Wright & Wagner Lofts (2021).

From the 1990s to 2011, downtown Beloit received direct public and private investment totaling more than $75 million. In 2011, Beloit was a Great American Main Street Award winner. In 2012, Beloit was listed #17 on Travel and Leisure's list of America's Greatest Mainstreets.

== Arts and culture ==
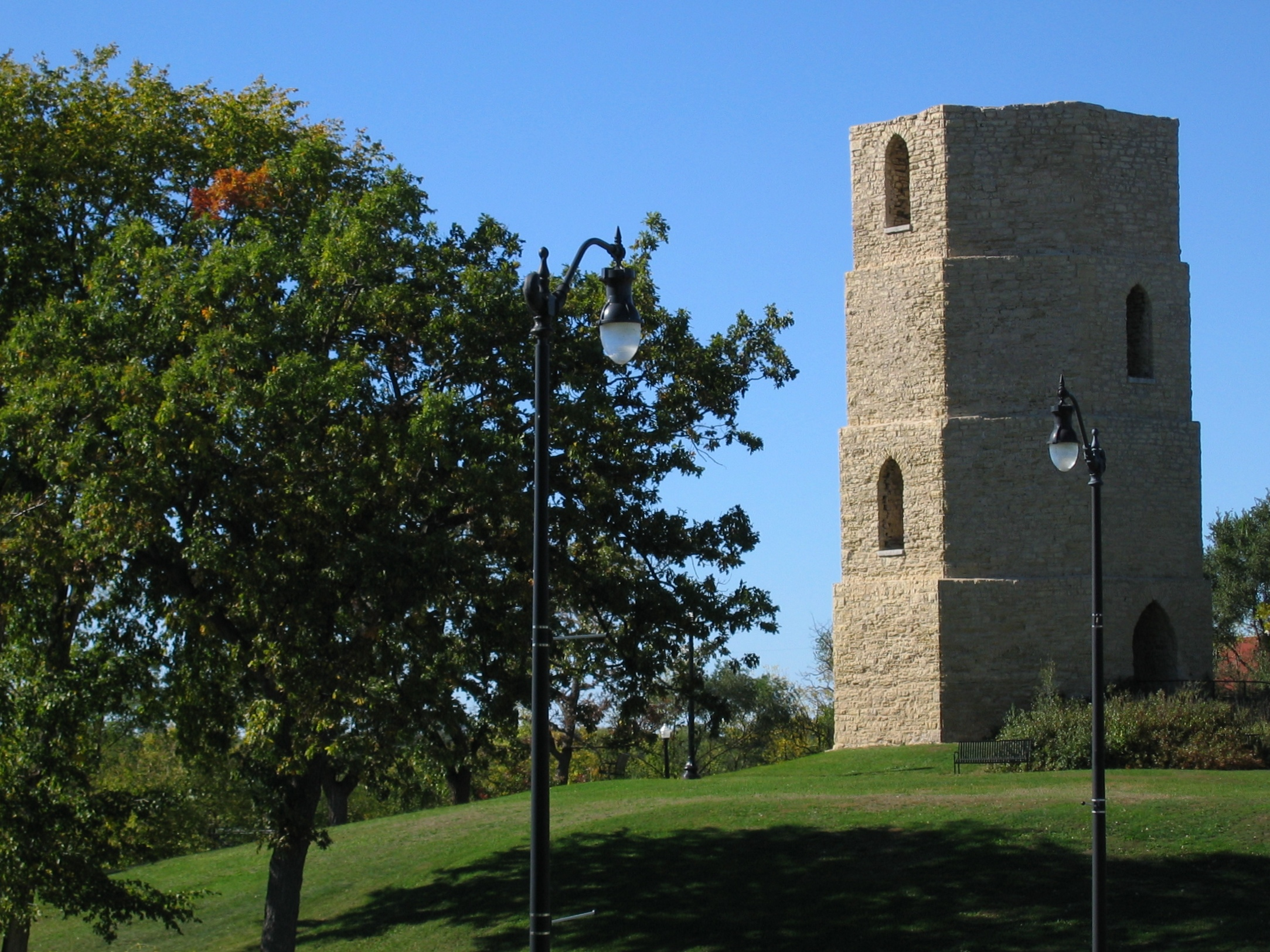
Beloit Water Tower, constructed in 1889

- Beloit Art Center
- Beloit Civic Theatre
- Beloit Historical Society
- Beloit Janesville Symphony Orchestra
- The Castle Performing Arts Center
- Logan Museum of Anthropology
- Turtle Creek Chamber Orchestra
- Wright Museum of Art
- Beloit City Hall – this houses a mural portraying the history of Beloit, completed in 1985 by artist Martha Nessler Hayden.

=== Historic buildings ===
Beloit's 1889 Water Tower Place began demolition in 1935, which was halted because of the cost. A historic pump station is nearby. The Fairbanks Flats were built in 1917 to house the rush of African Americans moving to the area from the Southern United States. Pearsons Hall of Science was designed by the architectural firm Burnham and Root for Beloit College as a science center. The Lathrop-Munn Cobblestone House was originally built for politician John Hackett. The Castle at 501 Prospect was built as First Presbyterian Church in 1902; it now operates as a Performing Arts Center and Music School.

=== Festivals ===
Beloit's main festivals include the Beloit International Film Festival and Beloit's Winterfest, which includes an indoor playland, ice skating, ice sculpting and toboggan races.

=== Library ===
Beloit has a public library that was part of the Arrowhead Library System which merged with Lakeshores Library System in 2023 to form Prairie Lakes Library System.

== Sports ==
Beloit is home to the Beloit Sky Carp, a professional minor league baseball team that play in the Midwest League and is the High-A affiliate of the Miami Marlins. The Sky Carp play their games at ABC Supply Stadium. From 1982 to 2021, they played at Harry C. Pohlman Field.

== Government ==
Beloit is represented by Mark Spreitzer and Stephen Nass in the Wisconsin State Senate, Clinton Anderson and Ellen Schutt in the Wisconsin State Assembly, Bryan Steil in the United States House of Representatives, and Ron Johnson and Tammy Baldwin in the United States Senate.

Beloit has a council-manager system of government, with seven council members, each elected for two-year terms. Four members are elected in even years and three in odd years. City council elections are held annually in April. The city council establishes policies for the city and appoints a city manager to implement those policies. The current city manager, Jerry Gabrielatos, started on February 20, 2023.

== Education ==
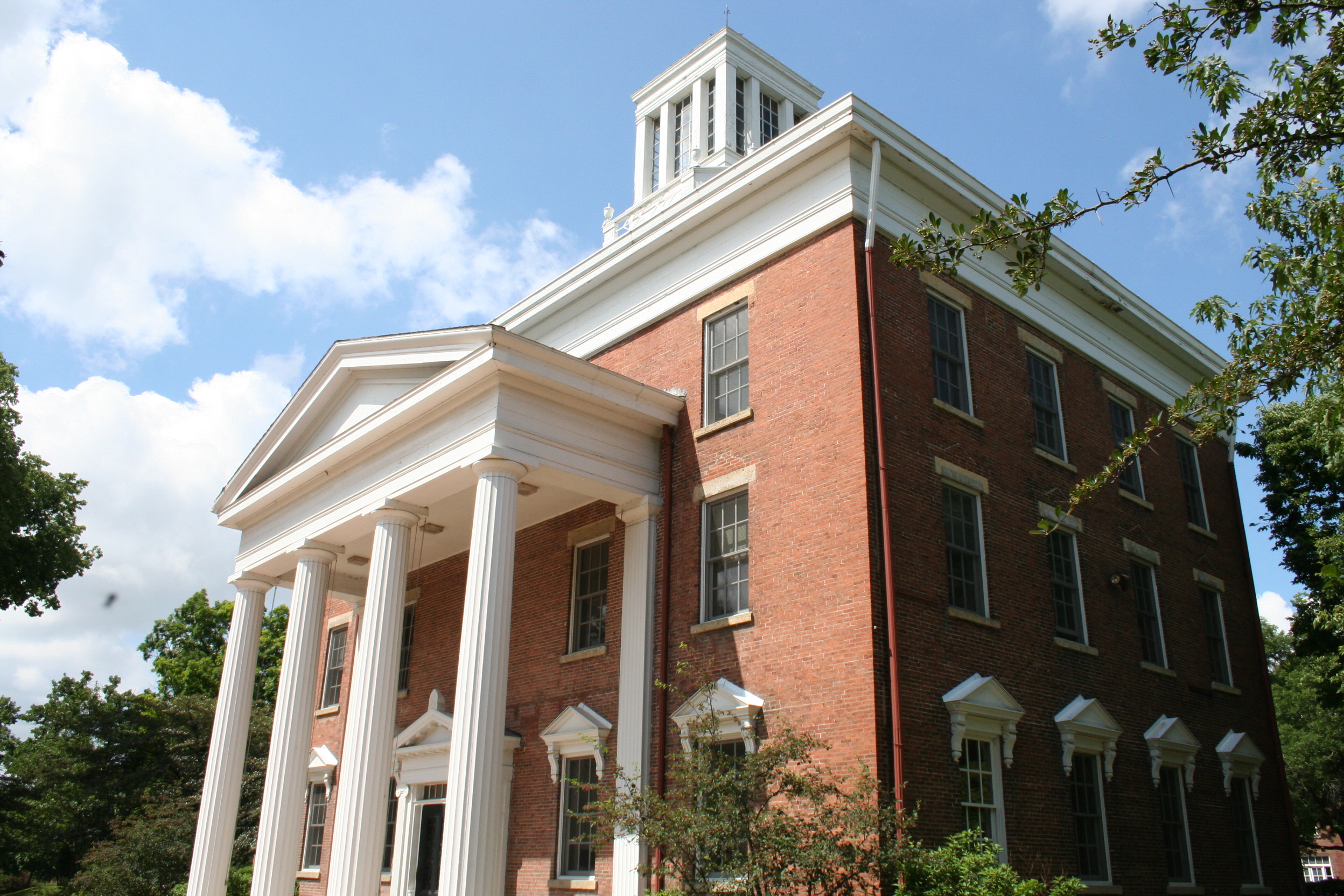
Middle College, on the Beloit College campus, is Wisconsin's oldest academic building still in use.

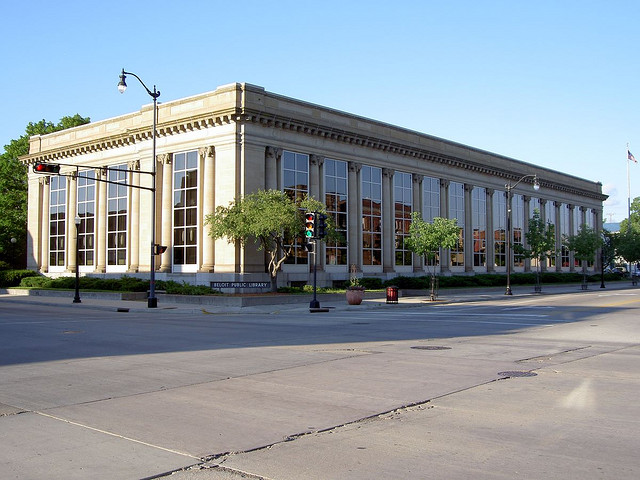
Hendricks Center for the Arts formerly as Beloit Public Library

The School District of Beloit serves 5,923 students across six primary schools, two intermediate schools, and one high school, offering alternative programming and a charter school. Beloit Memorial High School is the city's public high school. some areas of Beloit are served by the Beloit Turner School District. The district a charter school, The Lincoln Academy, which serves students from grades K4 through 12.

Beloit College, a private liberal arts college with undergraduate enrollment around 1,300, is located here. Blackhawk Technical College, a public technical school, has a campus in Beloit.

== Media ==
Newspapers include the Beloit Daily News, a daily serving the Wisconsin/Illinois stateline area, and the Janesville Gazette.

WGEZ (1490 AM) is a radio station in Beloit.

== Infrastructure ==
=== Transportation ===
==== Bus ====
- Beloit Transit
- Van Galder Bus Company

==== Highways ====
- Interstate 90
- Interstate 39
- Interstate 43
- U.S. Route 51

==== Air ====
- Beloit Airport, a public-use general aviation airport within the city.
- Southern Wisconsin Regional Airport, a public airport north of Beloit in Rock County.

== Notable people ==
- Thomas Ryum Amlie, U.S. Representative
- Clinton Anderson, Wisconsin State Representative
- Marcia Anderson, U. S. Army Major General
- Roy Chapman Andrews, adventurer and naturalist
- Fred Ascani, U.S. Air Force Major General
- Alan E. Ashcraft, Jr., Illinois State Representative
- Clinton Babbitt, U.S. Representative
- George B. Belting, Wisconsin State Representative
- James A. Blaisdell, founder of the Claremont Colleges
- Jim Breton, MLB player
- Jason W. Briggs, leader in development of Reorganized Church of Jesus Christ of Latter Day Saints
- James A. Brittan, Wisconsin State Representative
- Tony Brizzolara, MLB player
- Richard Burdge, Wisconsin State Senator
- Jackson J. Bushnell, educator
- Jim Caldwell, Beloit Memorial High School alumnus, former head coach of NFL's Detroit Lions
- Thomas Chrowder Chamberlin, geologist
- Franklin Clarke, professional football player for Dallas Cowboys (1960–1967) and Cleveland Browns (1957–1959)
- Ward Connell, NFL player
- Lawrence E. Cunningham, Wisconsin State Senator
- Horatio N. Davis, Wisconsin State Senator
- Delmar DeLong, Wisconsin State Representative
- Burger M. Engebretson, Wisconsin State Representative
- John E. Erickson, NBA executive
- Betty Everett, rock and jazz singer ("The Shoop Shoop Song")
- Edward A. Everett, Wisconsin State Representative
- Dorr Felt, inventor of comptometer
- Edwin G. Fifield, Wisconsin State Representative
- Lucius G. Fisher, state representative and businessman
- Bill Flannigan, NFL player
- Patsy Gharrity, MLB player
- Danny Gokey, American Idol contestant, choir director at a Beloit church
- Bernie Graham, professional baseball player
- John Hackett, businessman and politician
- Jim Hall, professional boxer
- Edward F. Hansen, Wisconsin State Representative
- William O. Hansen, Wisconsin State Representative
- Bill Hanzlik, NBA player and coach
- Jonathan Harr, journalist and author of A Civil Action
- Ken Hendricks, founder of ABC Supply, listed on the Forbes 400
- William H. Hurlbut, Wisconsin State Representative
- Gary Johnson, elected majority leader of Wisconsin Assembly in 1980 and 1983
- Jerry Kenney, baseball player for New York Yankees (1967, 1969–1972) and Cleveland Indians (1973)
- John Baxter Kinne, Medal of Honor recipient
- Stephanie Klett, television personality, Miss Wisconsin 1992
- Gene Knutson, NFL player
- Richard LaPiere, sociologist at Stanford University
- Eugene Lee, Tony Award-winning set designer (Wicked, Saturday Night Live)
- Wallace Leschinsky, Wisconsin State Representative
- Alonzo J. Mathison, Wisconsin State Representative
- Max Maxfield, Wyoming Secretary of State
- Juan Conway McNabb (John Conway McNabb), Roman Catholic bishop, missionary in Peru
- Sereno Merrill, Wisconsin State Representative
- Elmer Miller, MLB player
- Tommy Mills, head coach of Creighton Bluejays, Georgetown Hoyas and Arkansas State Indians football teams; Creighton and Arkansas State men's basketball, Notre Dame Fighting Irish baseball
- Orsen N. Nielsen, U.S. diplomat
- David Noggle, Wisconsin State Representative, Chief Justice of Supreme Court of Idaho Territory
- Russ Oltz, NFL player
- Terell Parks, professional basketball player
- Danica Patrick, Indy Car & NASCAR auto racing driver and model
- George Perring, MLB player
- Samuel L. Plummer, Wisconsin State Representative
- Alan S. Robertson, Wisconsin State Representative
- Robert P. Robinson, Wisconsin State Senator
- Judy Robson, former majority leader, Wisconsin Senate
- David Roth, opera director
- Jane Sherman, actress, writer, composer, dancer with The Rockettes
- Richard Shoemaker, Wisconsin State Senator
- Tracy Silverman, violinist
- Mark Simonson, font designer
- Erastus G. Smith, Wisconsin State Representative
- Simon Smith, Wisconsin State Representative
- Robert C. Strong, U.S. diplomat
- William Barstow Strong, former president of Atchison, Topeka and Santa Fe Railway
- Tyree Talton, NFL player
- Rusty Tillman, NFL player and assistant coach, XFL head coach
- S. J. Todd, Wisconsin State Senator
- Marijuana Pepsi Vandyck, education professional
- Allen F. Warden, Wisconsin State Representative
- Arthur Pratt Warner, aviator and inventor
- Kyle Weaver, professional basketball player for Oklahoma City Thunder
- Floyd E. Wheeler, Wisconsin State Representative and lawyer
- John D. Wickhem, Justice of Wisconsin Supreme Court
- Albert J. Winegar, Wisconsin State Representative
- Delaphine Grace Wyckoff, microbiologist and educator
- Zip Zabel, MLB player
- Robin Zander, musician (Cheap Trick)

== See also ==
- Thompson Observatory
