= Fairbanks-Morse =

American manufacturing company

Fairbanks, Morse & Company
- Wax seal version of FM logo.
- Predecessor: Fairbanks scales, Eclipse Windmill
- Founded: Saint Johnsbury, Vermont, United States (1823)
- Fate: Merged with Penn-Texas Corporation in 1958 to form Fairbanks Whitney Corporation. Former subsidiary Fairbanks-Morse Engine purchased by Arcline Investment Management from Enpro Industries Inc. as of January 21, 2020
- Successor: Fairbanks Scales, Fairbanks Morse, Fairbanks Nijhuis
- Headquarters: United States
- Area served: World
- Products: Scales, Windmills, Engines, Tractors, Radios, Pumps, Locomotives.

Fairbanks, Morse and Company was an American manufacturing company that existed from 1823 until 1958. Founded in 1823 as a manufacturer of weighing scales, it later diversified into pumps, engines, windmills, coffee grinders, radios, farm tractors, feed mills, locomotives, and industrial supplies. It was purchased by the Penn-Texas conglomerate in 1958.

There are three separate corporate entities that could be considered successors to the company, none of which is a complete and direct descendant of the original company. All claim the heritage of Fairbanks Morse and Company:

- Fairbanks Scales is a privately owned company in Kansas City, Missouri, that manufactures scales
- Fairbanks Morse Defense, a subsidiary company of Arcline Investment Management, is a company based in Beloit, Wisconsin, that manufactures and services engines
- Fairbanks Nijhuis is a part of Pentair Water in Kansas City, Kansas, and manufactures pumps

== Founding and early history ==
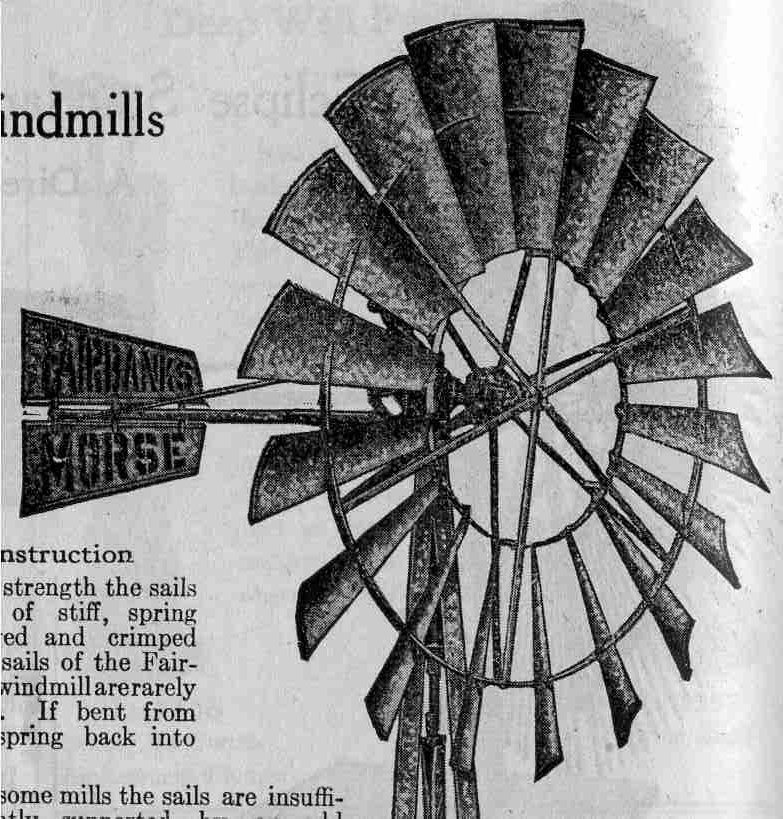
Fairbanks-Morse windmill

Fairbanks Morse and Company began in 1823 when inventor Thaddeus Fairbanks opened an ironworks in St. Johnsbury, Vermont, to manufacture two of his patented inventions: a cast iron plow and a heating stove. In 1829 he started a hemp dressing business for which he built the machinery. Though unsuccessful in fabricating for fiber factories, another of Morse's inventions, the platform scale, formed the basis for the later company. It was patented in June 1832, and a generation later, with his brother Erastus Fairbanks, the E. & T. Fairbanks & Company was selling thousands of scales, first in the United States, later in Europe, South America, and Imperial China. Fairbanks scales won 63 medals over the years in international competition.

In Wisconsin, former missionary Leonard Wheeler designed a durable windmill for pumping water, the Eclipse windmill. Wheeler set up shop in Beloit just after the Civil War. Soon half a million windmills dotted the landscape throughout the West and as far away as Australia. At about the same time, a Fairbanks & Company employee, Charles Hosmer Morse, opened a Fairbanks office in Chicago, from which he expanded the company's territory of operation and widened its product line. As part of this expansion, Morse brought Wheeler and his Eclipse Windmill pumps into business with the Fairbanks company. Morse later became a partner in the Fairbanks Company and by the end of the nineteenth century, it was known as Fairbanks Morse & Company and was headquartered in Chicago. Canadian and American cities had branch dealerships, with Fairbanks first coming to Montreal, Quebec, Canada, in 1876 and later opening a factory there.

== Market expansion ==
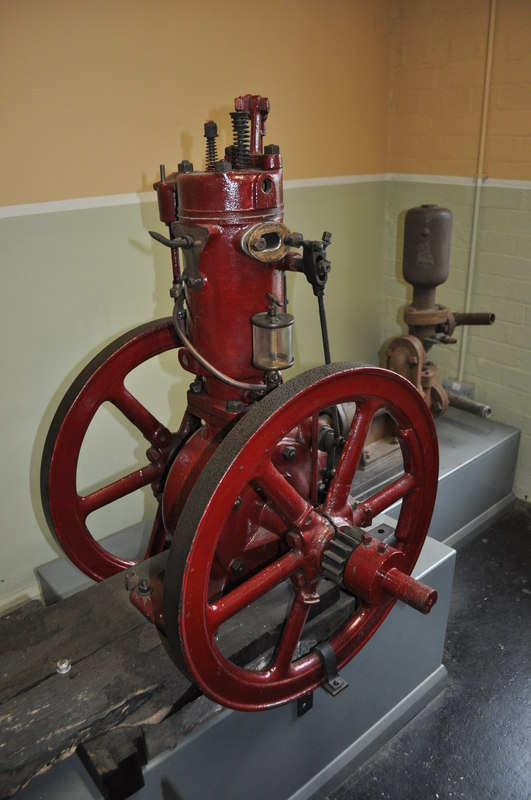
Fairbanks Morse Type T gas engine

In the late nineteenth century, business expanded in the Western United States, as did the company's catalog. It grew to include typewriters, hand trucks, railway velocipedes, pumps, tractors, and a variety of warehouse and bulk shipping tools. The company became an industrial supplier distributing complete "turn-key" systems: tools, plumbing, gauges, gaskets, parts, valves, and pipe. Its 1910 catalog contained over 800 pages.

The Fairbanks Morse Company began producing oil and naptha engines in the 1890s with the purchase of the Charter line of engines (the first commercially available gas engine). They had the idea that an engine could be used as backup power for when one of their Eclipse windmills wasn't getting wind. The Fairbanks Morse gas engine became a success with farmers. Electricity generation and oilfield work also used these engines. Small lighting plants built by the company were also popular. Fairbanks Morse power plants evolved by burning kerosene in 1893, coal gas in 1905, then to semi-diesel engines in 1913 and to full diesel engines in 1924. The Model N was popular in stationary industrial applications.

In 1934, Fairbanks-Morse entered the radio business by acquiring the Audiola Radio Co. After a 1939 factory fire FM decided to exit the radio business. Fairbanks-Morse radios are well known for their colorfulness. The company also had brief forays into building automobiles, tractors, corn shellers, hammermills, cranes, televisions, and refrigerators, but output was small in these fields.

After the expiration of Rudolf Diesel's American license in 1912, Fairbanks Morse (FM) entered the large engine business. The company's larger Model Y semi-diesel became a standard workhorse, and sugar, rice, timber, and mine mills used the engine. The model Y was available in sizes from one through six cylinders, or 10 to 200 horsepower (150 kW). The Y-VA engine was the first high-compression, cold-start, full diesel developed by Fairbanks Morse without the acquisition of any foreign patent. This machine was developed in Beloit and introduced in 1924. The company expanded its line to the marine CO engine (Many 100 H.P. CO marine engines were used in the Philippine Islands to power ferry boats) as well as the mill model E, a modernized Y diesel. From this, Fairbanks-Morse became a major engine manufacturer and developed plants for railway and marine applications. The development of the diesel locomotive, tug, and ship in the 1930s fostered the expansion of the company.

== "Z" Engine Line ==
Fairbanks-Morse renamed their headless 1.5 horsepower (1.1 kW) Model to "Z" in July 1914, according to engine historian C.H. Wendel. On all "Z" engines the gasoline tank is located in the base. In 1917, they expanded the line to include more sizes. In 1918, they stopped making headless models and adapted the 1.5 H.P. to have a head, and larger H.P. engines could now run on Kerosene. In 1928 The "Z" style "D" was introduced, and was entirely enclosed. The Z was made in incremental sizes of 3, 6, 12, 15 and up to 20 horsepower (15 kW). Over a half million units were produced in the following 30 years. In the early 1980s the line was sold off to Bell. The model Z found favor with farmers, and is a collectable today.

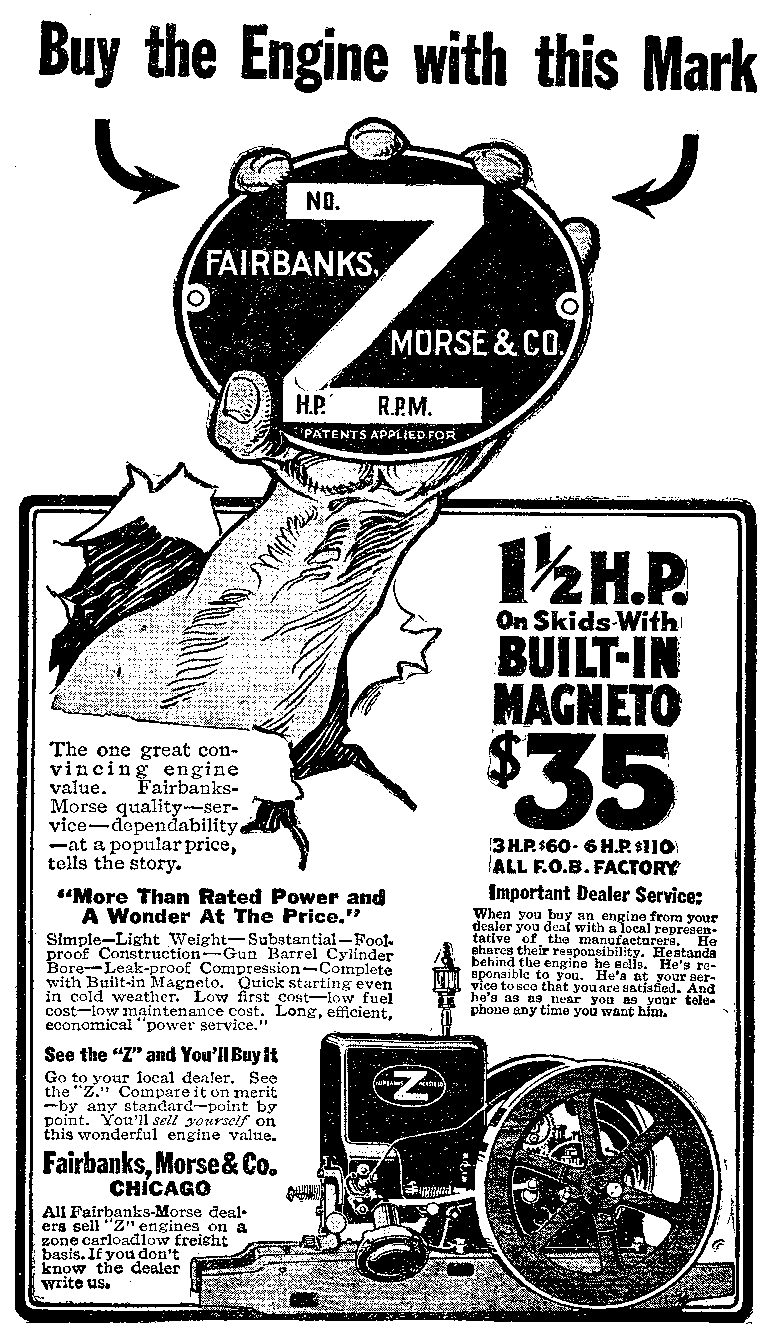
Advertisement for 1916 "Z" engine

== Marine diesel engines ==
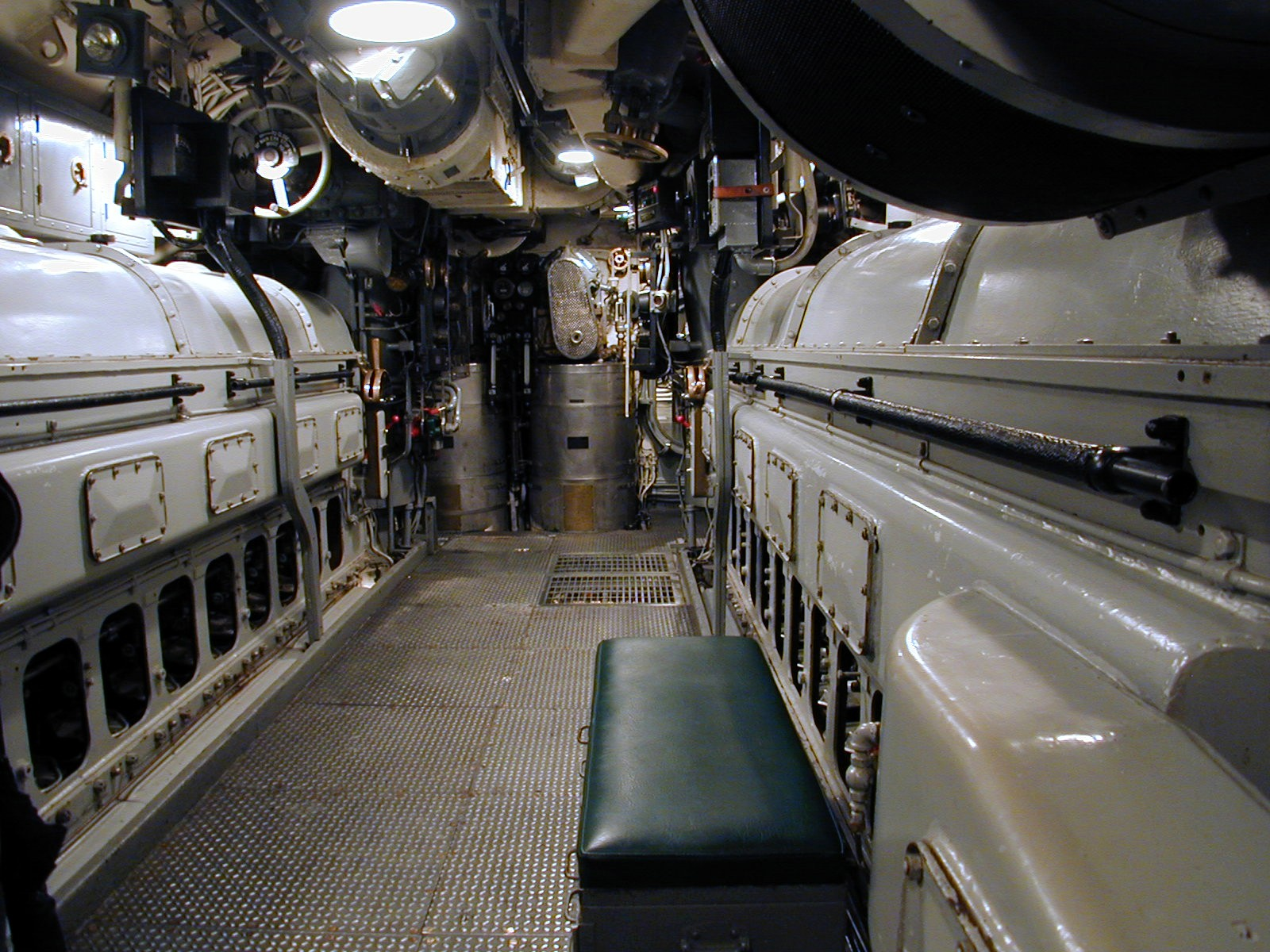
Fairbanks-Morse opposed piston diesel engines on the WWII submarine USS Pampanito (SS-383) (on display in San Francisco).

During World War I, a large order of 60 30 H.P. CO marine engines were installed in British decoy fishing ships to lure German submarines within range of their 6" naval guns. In 1939 Fairbanks-Morse developed a marine engine using an unusual opposed piston (OP) design, similar in arrangement to a series of German Junkers aircraft diesels. The most common variant for submarines through the 1990s was the 38D 8-1/8 engine, ranging from 4 to 12 cylinders. This engine was delivered to the U.S. Navy in large numbers, often for use in fleet submarines, which used 9- or 10-cylinder versions as main engines in World War II. When the innovative but faulty EMD 16-338 "pancake" engines of the Tang class proved unworkable, they were replaced with World War II-style Fairbanks-Morse engines, and these remained standard on US diesel-powered submarines through the early 1960s. These and other Fairbanks-Morse OP engines were also used as backup power on US nuclear submarines through the Seawolf class of the 1990s. Fairbanks-Morse ranked 60th among United States corporations in the value of World War II military production contracts. The US Navy has had Fairbanks-Morse diesels in operation on its submarines almost continuously since 1938. They remain in service on Los Angeles-, Seawolf-, and Ohio-class nuclear submarines of the US Navy. In addition to OP engines (used in the USCGC Hamilton class), Fairbanks-Morse license builds Pielstick (used in the Whidbey Island-class dock landing ships and San Antonio-class amphibious transport docks), Alco (used in USCGC Polar Sea), and M.A.N. design engines.

Other World War II era models are the 875 hp 5-cylinder Model 37E16 installed in some T1 tankers.

== Railroad locomotives ==
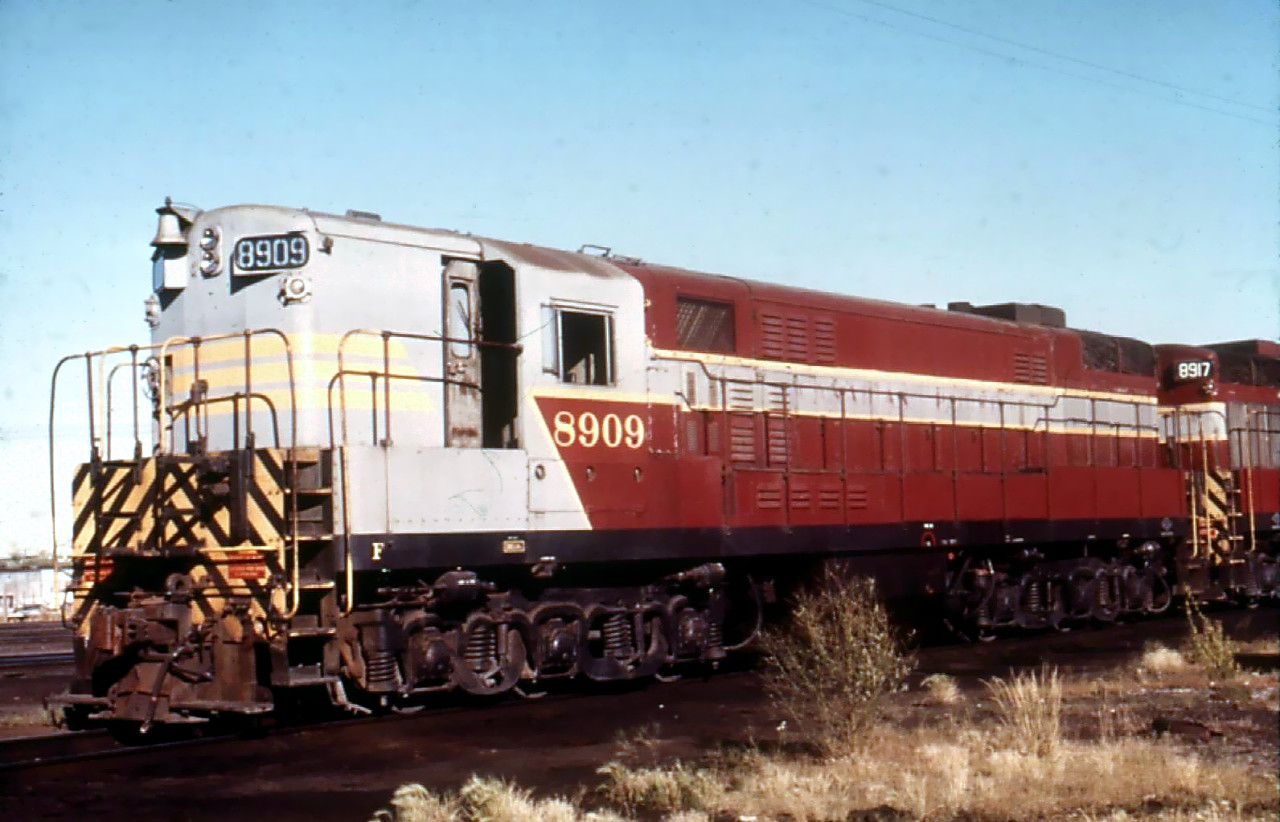
Canadian Locomotive Company "Train Master", 1953

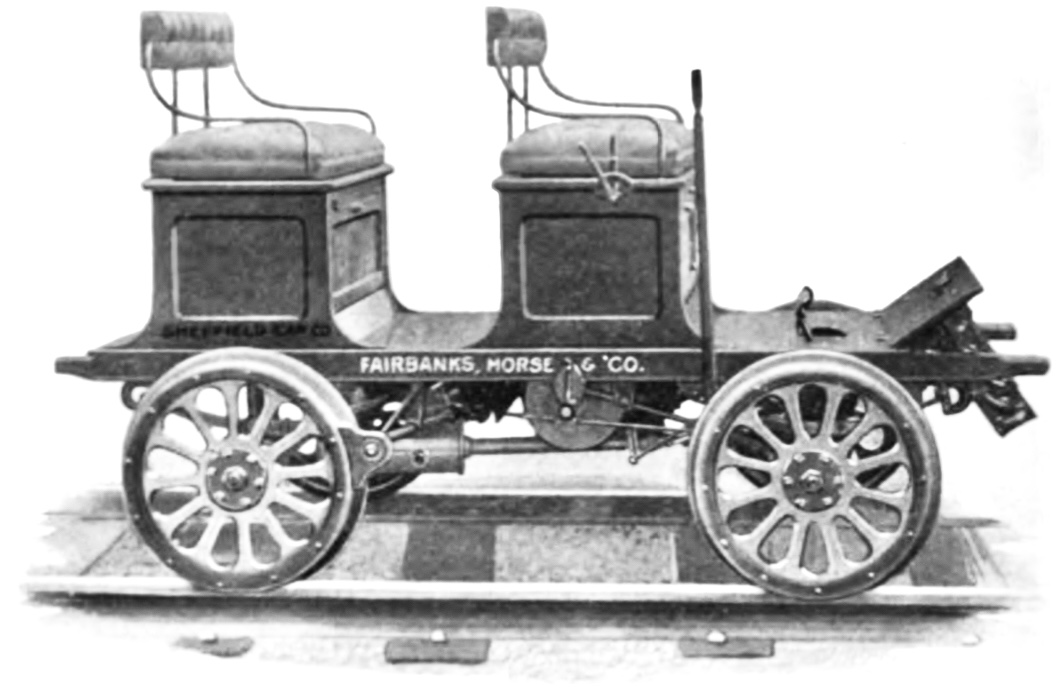
Fairbanks, Morse & Company draisine (1912)

Shortly after it won its first U.S. Navy contract, the company introduced its 5 in (13 cm) bore by 6 in (15 cm) stroke opposed piston diesel engine to the rail industry, installing the engine in various self-propelled railcars. This engine proved unreliable, and was superseded by a larger 5-cylinder 8 in (20 cm) bore by 10 in (25 cm) stroke engine that produced 800 hp and was installed in the OP800 railcars in 1939.

In 1935, F-M launched a long-term plan to build locomotives in-house. It hired electrical engineer John K. Stotz from Westinghouse Electric Corporation and began developing plans for a 1,000 hp switcher and a 2,000 hp multipurpose locomotive. While the company was ready to begin production of the units in 1940, the War Production Board (WPB) denied it permission, citing the national interest of F-M's production of submarine engines and a locomotive market supplied by existing manufacturers. In 1943, the WPB approved F-M's plans to sell locomotives, and it introduced the 1,000 hp switcher H-10-44 in 1944, followed by the 2,000 hp cab unit, dubbed the Erie-built for its outsourced assembly location, in late 1945. The early locomotives soon proved unreliable, as high-stress railroad service exposed weaknesses in the engine that had not been seen in less demanding marine applications. In 1947, F-M reorganized its locomotive division, hiring new managers and building a dedicated factory the following year.

In 1947, F-M introduced two new road switcher models, the 1,500 hp H-15-44 and the 2,000 hp H-20-44. In late 1949, the company's new cab units, named the Consolidated Line, were introduced to replace the Erie-builts in its catalog. None of the late-1940s models sold as well as competing units from EMD and Alco, and the Consolidated Line fared particularly poorly as cab units fell out of favor on American railroads. In 1951 F-M began designing a new large locomotive, and in 1953 it introduced the 2,400 hp H-24-66 Train Master, then the highest-powered locomotive available. It also proved unpopular. In 1956, the Santa Fe ordered three specialized units, based on the H12-44, for terminal switching in Chicago's Dearborn Station: the H12-44TS ("TS" for "Terminal Switcher"). They remained in service until the early 1970s.

In 1958, F-M built its last locomotive for the American market, followed in 1963 by its final delivery to a Mexican customer. In total, it sold 1,460 diesel locomotives.

== Tractor ==
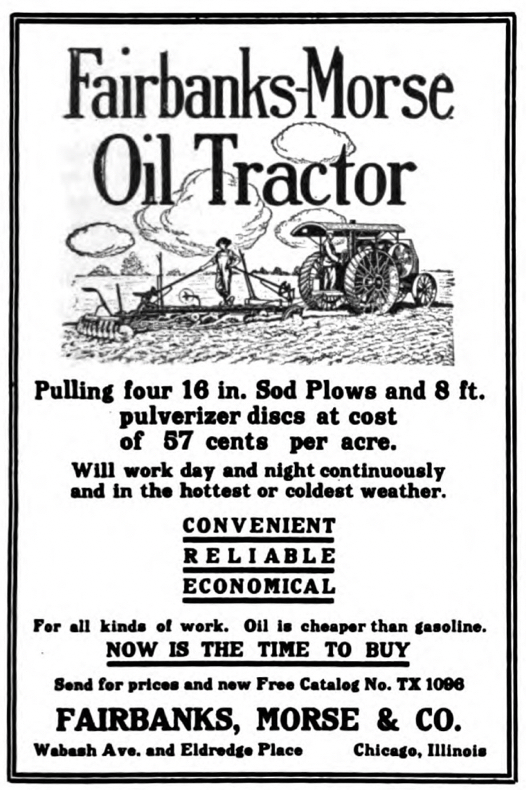
Fairbanks, Morse & Company Tractor advertisement (1912)

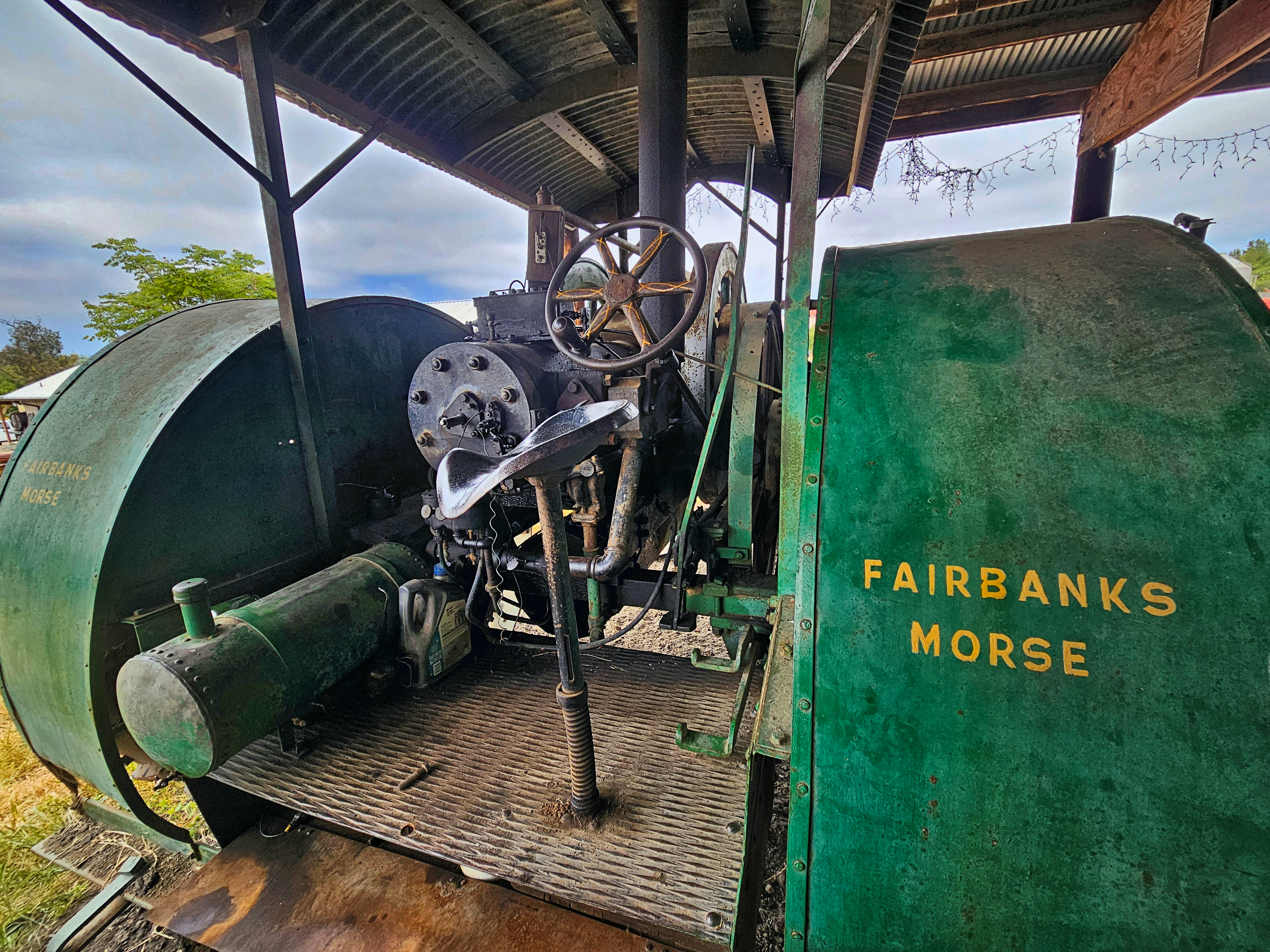
Fairbanks, Morse & Company Tractor

Fairbanks-Morse tractors were produced from 1910 to 1920. Well-known are the models 15-25, 30-60, 10-20, and 12-25.

== Post-war power products ==
Fairbanks Morse continued to build diesel and gas engines, as it had been doing for the first half of the twentieth century. This is in addition to the pump and engine division, which produced Canadian Fairbanks Morse-branded products for farms, factories and mines.

Export offices were established in Rio de Janeiro and Buenos Aires; a factory was opened in Mexico, where model Z engines were built well into the 1980s. An Australian branch factory, similar to the Canadian Branch operation, was opened; remote sheep stations benefited from their products. It dated from 1902, when Cooper Sheep Shearing Machinery Ltd was set up in Sydney, and became an agent for Fairbanks Morse in that hemisphere.

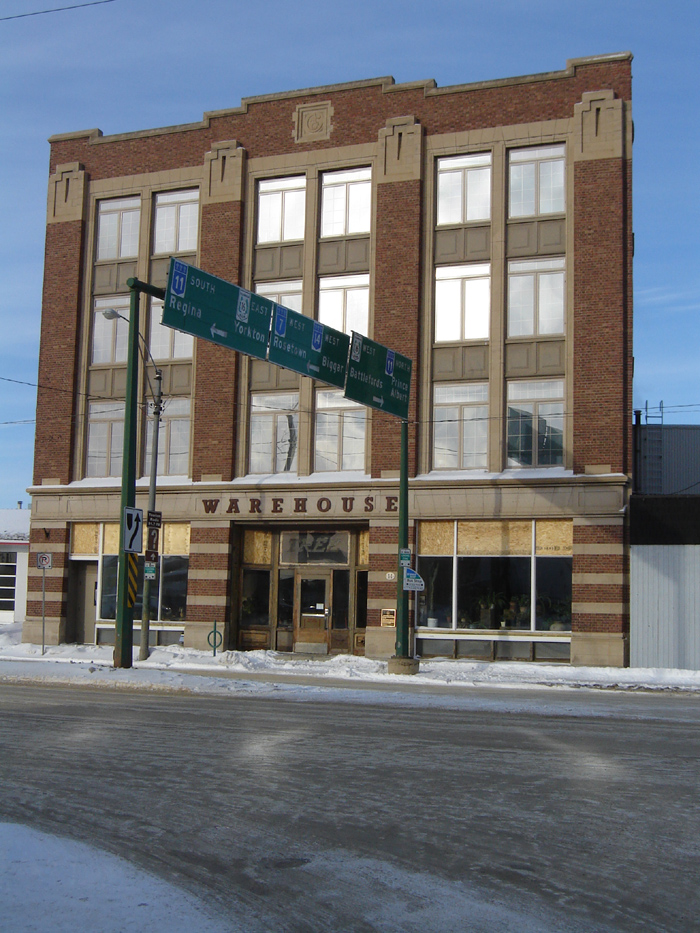
Fairbanks-Morse warehouse, Saskatoon, Saskatchewan

The company sold and updated the Eclipse model of windmill pumps in North America until they became obsolete with widespread rural electrification in the 1940s. Low-cost electricity from the grid also eliminated the need for local power production by small and medium diesel plants. While many Fairbanks Morse engines dutifully served into the late twentieth century, they could not compete with modernization, regional plant closures, and grid electricity.

An inter-family feud for control of the company in 1956 between the sons of Charles Morse weakened the company. Consequently, Fairbanks-Morse was merged with Penn-Western in 1958. The downhill slide continued for the next few decades, with assets being sold off, and branches of the company closed. Regional sales offices were closed, and the one-shop model no longer appealed to buyers in the new consumer age. Automakers, tractor makers, and locomotive builders made inroads into Fairbanks-Morse's market share. Thus the company spiraled down, and was sold.

== Corporate disposition ==
Fairbanks Morse and Company merged with Penn-Texas Corporation in 1958 to form Fairbanks Whitney Corporation. Fairbanks Whitney was reorganized as Colt Industries in 1964, taking the name from Colt Manufacturing, the maker of firearms and an asset of Penn-Texas. In 1988, the Fairbanks Morse Pump division was sold off to private investors to become Fairbanks Morse Pump. It was subsequently purchased by Pentair as part of an acquisition of General Signal Pump Group in 1997. In 1988, the scale business was sold off by Colt Industries and became Fairbanks Scales, still an independent company.

In 1990, Colt Industries sold its firearms business to C.F. Holdings Corp as Colt's Manufacturing Company, Inc. and became Coltec Industries, Inc., which later became a subsidiary of EnPro Industries, Inc. EnPro was then the parent company of Fairbanks Morse Engine until January 21, 2020, when Fairbanks Morse was sold to Arcline Investment Management.

As a result, there are now three companies using either the Fairbanks or Fairbanks Morse trademarks, with lineage to the original Fairbanks Morse and Company. Fairbanks Scale and Fairbanks Morse Pump claim lineage back to E & T Fairbanks Company.

== Modern descendants ==
- In the 1990s, Fairbanks Morse merged with ALCO to make the FM | ALCO line. In October 2013, FM signed a joint development and licensing agreement with Achates Power to reduce emissions and fuel consumption of Fairbanks Morse proprietary and dual-fuel opposed-piston engines. The opposed-piston (OP) diesel engine once made by Fairbanks-Morse is still (August 2019) manufactured. Also, Fairbanks-Morse still (November 2021) manufactures large four-stroke diesel engines such as the FM 48/60 CR series, which ranges from 7,200 to 19,200 kWm in output.
- Fairbanks Scales has dropped the Morse from the name as most scales made by FM had.
- Fairbanks Nijhuis makes pumps.

== See also ==
- List of Fairbanks-Morse locomotives
- Fairbanks Morse 38 8-1/8 diesel engine
- Fairbanks Morse Defense
