= National Register of Historic Places listings in Rock County, Wisconsin =

Location of Rock County in Wisconsin

This is a list of the National Register of Historic Places listings in Rock County, Wisconsin. It is intended to provide a comprehensive listing of entries in the National Register of Historic Places that are located in Rock County, Wisconsin. The locations of National Register properties for which the latitude and longitude coordinates are included below may be seen in a map.

There are 142 properties and districts listed on the National Register in the county. Another seven properties were once listed but have been removed.

This National Park Service list is complete through NPS recent listings posted September 4, 2026.

== Current listings ==
	Name on the Register	Image	Date listed	Location	City or town	Description
1	Adams Elementary School		April 1, 2025 (#100011592)	1138 East Memorial Drive; 42°41′37″N 89°00′39″W	Janesville	Public school designed by Law, Law & Potter in Classical Revival style, with influences of Stripped Classicism and Art Deco. Built in 1939 with support from the Public Works Administration. Added to in 1952, 1976 and 1995.
2	John Alexander Wheat Warehouse	John Alexander Wheat Warehouse	September 13, 1978 (#78003383)	304 S. Janesville St. 42°46′29″N 88°56′11″W	Milton	Italianate-styled warehouse with poured grout walls a foot thick, built about 1850 when wheat was king. Later a blacksmith shop, a filling station, and an apple warehouse.
3	Abram Allen House	Abram Allen House	September 13, 1978 (#78003386)	205 E. Madison Ave. 42°46′45″N 88°56′54″W	Milton	1853 house with grout walls and Greek Revival styling, built by Allen, an early settler.
4	The Armory	The Armory	November 21, 1978 (#78000130)	10 S. High St. 42°40′49″N 89°01′40″W	Janesville	1930 armory designed by Lt. Colonel Henry C. Hengles in Spanish Revival style, with walls of colored brick and tile roof. Originally housed the 32nd Tank Company of the Wisconsin National Guard, which helped defend Bataan in 1941-42 and endured the Bataan Death March. Nearly two thirds did not return.
5	Bartlett Memorial Historical Museum	Bartlett Memorial Historical Museum	April 11, 1977 (#77000048)	2149 St. Lawrence Ave. 42°30′15″N 89°04′10″W	Beloit	Greek Revival/Italianate-styled limestone house built around 1857, with barn and smokehouse. Builder James Hanchett built dams, including several on the Rock River. John and Lillie Bartlett bought it in 1901, and three of John's sisters became MDs - early for women. Now a private residence.
6	Beloit Power Plant	Beloit Power Plant	July 31, 2017 (#100001404)	850 Pleasant St. 42°30′23″N 89°01′56″W	Beloit	Coal-fired, steam turbine power plant, built on the Rock River in 1907 and expanded many times after. Consists of the powerhouse and the crusher house.
7	Beloit Water Tower	Beloit Water Tower	January 7, 1983 (#83003410)	1005 Pleasant St. 42°30′33″N 89°01′49″W	Beloit	36-foot octagonal, stepped limestone tower which supported a 20-foot tall cypress water tank, completed in 1889. Built by a private consortium, largely for fire protection.
8	Benton Avenue Historic District	Benton Avenue Historic District	March 7, 1996 (#96000251)	Roughly bounded by Benton Ave., Milton Ave., Sherman Ave., Richardson St., Blaine Ave. and Prairie Ave. 42°41′48″N 89°00′48″W	Janesville	Neighborhood of modest homes (mostly bungalows) built on small lots in 1919 and 1920 by developer Matteson and Landstrom of Chicago, probably aiming to sell them to workers from Samson Tractor. Good examples are the 1-story front-gabled bungalow at 821 Blaine St. the 1-story side-gabled Sullivan bungalow at 808 Benton, the 1.5-story bungalow at 875 Sherman, and the American Foursquare Ocheltree house at 938 Benton.
9	Selvy Blodgett House	Selvy Blodgett House	May 23, 1980 (#80000183)	417 Bluff St. 42°29′59″N 89°02′29″W	Beloit	1.5-story house built 1847-1850, with thick limestone walls and Greek Revival styling. New Yorker Selvy was a son of Caleb Blodget, first permanent settler of Beloit, and he and his son later owned the Blodgett (flour) Milling Co.
10	Bluff Street Historic District	Bluff Street Historic District	January 7, 1983 (#83003411)	Roughly both sides of Bluff St. from Shirland Ave. to Merrill St. 42°30′04″N 89°02′30″W	Beloit	Neighborhood of houses and churches near the industrial area along the Rock River, including the 1848 Lathrop-Munn cobblestone house, the late-1840s Selvy-Blodgett house, the 1858 Italianate-style Parker house, the 1877 Gothic Revival-styled Norwegian Lutheran Church, the 1889 Queen Anne/Stick-style Anderson house (pictured), the 1890 Queen Anne-styled Aldrich house, and the 1909 Queen Anne/Tudor Revival Evans house.
11	Bostwick Avenue Historic District	Bostwick Avenue Historic District	April 24, 2006 (#06000321)	404-436 Bostwick Ave. and 1118 and 1128 Grace St. 42°40′56″N 89°00′37″W	Janesville	Small group of period revival houses built after WWI as Janesville industrialized, including the 1922 Dutch Colonial Revival Slawson house, the 1928 Tudor Revival Pember house, the 1929 Colonial Revival Grubb house, the 1933 Colonial Revival Conrad house (pictured), the 1937 Cape Cod-style Bogardus house, and the 1940 Tudor Revival Tait house.
12	Brasstown Cottage	Brasstown Cottage	March 4, 1983 (#83003412)	1701 Colley Rd. 42°30′26″N 89°00′53″W	Beloit	Worker's cottage, but with Stick style bargeboards, bay, porch and lattice typical of a larger, more expensive home. This is the best-preserved survivor of many such cottages that were built here in the late 1800s near the Union Brass factory.
13	Church of St. Thomas the Apostle	Church of St. Thomas the Apostle	January 7, 1983 (#83003413)	822 E. Grand Ave. 42°29′58″N 89°01′41″W	Beloit	1885 brick church with Gothic-style details and Stick style porches. Home of Beloit's oldest Catholic parish, with roots back to 1846.
14	Citizens Bank	Citizens Bank	August 1, 1985 (#85001661)	Front & Allen Sts. 42°33′12″N 88°51′46″W	Clinton	1882 red brick Italianate-styled building with chamfered corner, segmental-arched windows, and bracketed cornice. With street-level corner bays clad in Neoclassical-style grey stone.
15	City of Beloit Waterworks and Pump Station	City of Beloit Waterworks and Pump Station	September 13, 1990 (#90001460)	1005 Pleasant St. 42°30′32″N 89°01′51″W	Beloit	1885 building constructed by a private company to pump water into the old tower up the hill and into the mains to supply high pressure at the fire hydrants. Also a concrete reservoir and a 1927 metal water tower and pump shed.
16	Clark-Brown House	Clark-Brown House	September 13, 1985 (#85002126)	3457 Riverside Dr. 42°33′45″N 89°02′06″W	Beloit	Greek Revival-style house built in 1847, with corner quoins, cornice returns, and most notably, a veneer of fine cobblestone.
17	Clinton Village Hall	Clinton Village Hall	August 1, 1985 (#85001660)	301 Cross St. 42°33′18″N 88°51′42″W	Clinton	2-story dark brick Gothic Revival-style municipal building with square central tower, built in 1913 to house Clinton's city offices, fire department, and library.
18	Clinton Water Tower	Clinton Water Tower	March 7, 1985 (#85000493)	High St. 42°33′39″N 88°51′48″W	Clinton	59-foot standpipe on the highest point in Clinton, built of limestone by mason Jacob Miller in 1895. Originally supported a large wooden water tank, which was replaced in 1929 by a metal tank.
19	Columbus Circle Historic District	Columbus Circle Historic District	May 19, 2005 (#05000453)	Columbus Circle generally bounded by N. Adams and E. Milwaukee Sts. and N. Garfield Ave. 42°41′24″N 89°00′38″W	Janesville	Modest residential neighborhood developed from the mid-1920s to 1943, including the 1927 Dutch Colonial Revival Taylor house, the 1927 Spanish Colonial Revival-influenced Haugan house, the 1927 Mediterranean Revival Smiley house, the 1928 Colonial Revival-style Curler house, the 1928 Tudor Revival McWilliams House, the 1930 French Provincial style Carpenter house, and the 1942 Contemporary-style Jensen house.
20	Conrad Cottages Historic District	Conrad Cottages Historic District	March 11, 1993 (#93000157)	235-330 Milton Ave. 42°41′12″N 89°01′03″W	Janesville	Small group of intact homes, consisting of the 1845 Greek Revival-style Taylor house, the 1855 Gothic Revival-influenced Meyher house, the 1870 Second Empire-style Jenkins house, and the four Conrad cottages. These cottages are similar, cream brick Italianate-style houses built by local grocer Charles B. Conrad in 1882 as early tract housing.
21	Cooksville Cheese Factory	Cooksville Cheese Factory	September 17, 1980 (#80000395)	SR 1; 42°50′06″N 89°14′36″W	Evansville (Cooksville)	Cheese factory built in 1875 by a farmers' co-op. Served as a social center too until closed in 1884.
22	Cooksville Historic District	Cooksville Historic District	October 25, 1973 (#73000254)	Both sides of streets bordering the Public Sq. and Rock St. 42°50′08″N 89°14′19″W	Cooksville	Village built around a public square, resembling the New England villages where many of the settlers had roots. Includes the 1842 frame John Cook house, 1846-48 Greek Revival style Lovejoy-Duncan house, the 1840s Cooksville General Store, the ca. 1847 Gothic Revival Backenstoe-Howard house, the 1851 frame Cure-Van Vleck house, the 1852 Gothic Revival Hoxie house, the 1879 Congregational Church, the 1886 Cooksville school, and the 1896 Norwegian Lutheran Church. The village largely stopped changing in 1857 when the railroad bypassed it.
23	Cooksville Mill and Mill Pond Site	Cooksville Mill and Mill Pond Site	September 17, 1980 (#80000394)	SR 1; 42°50′19″N 89°14′32″W	Evansville (Cooksville)	Site on Badfish Creek where John Cook built his sawmill in 1842 and followers built a gristmill in 1847. Derelict by the 1890s. Foundations and an earth embankment remain.
24	Cooper-Gillies House	Cooper-Gillies House	September 17, 1980 (#80000397)	SR 1; 42°50′03″N 89°15′17″W	Evansville (Cooksville)	4-bay brick Greek Revival-styled house built in the early 1850s by Mathew Cooper on a ridge overlooking Cooksville. Bought by David Gillies in 1862.
25	Courier Building	Courier Building	August 24, 2015 (#15000552)	513 Vernal Ave. 42°46′50″N 88°57′47″W	Milton	2-story Italianate-styled paint store built in 1887, then taken over in 1907 by The Weekly Telephone, a predecessor of the Milton Courier, which remains in the building.
26	Court Street Methodist Church	Court Street Methodist Church	November 17, 1977 (#77000045)	36 S. Main St. 42°40′55″N 89°01′17″W	Janesville	A Methodist congregation built this dignified, but un-churchy-looking Second Empire-styled building in 1868, with store space at street-level and the sanctuary above. Bought by a Masonic Order in 1905 and converted for use as their temple, which lasted until 1965.
27	Courthouse Hill Historic District	Courthouse Hill Historic District	January 17, 1986 (#86000205)	Roughly bounded by E. Milwaukee St., Garfield and Oakland Aves., S. Main St., and E. Court St. and Milton Ave. 42°41′00″N 89°00′58″W	Janesville	A 30-block area on the east side containing many upscale homes of Janesville's influential leaders, ranging from the mid-1850s Greek Revival-style Abel Jones house to the 1929 Georgian Revival-style Wheeler house.
28	J. W. Crist House	J. W. Crist House	January 7, 1983 (#83003414)	2601 Afton Rd. 42°32′26″N 89°03′04″W	Beloit	Brick-clad Queen Anne-style house with octagonal corner tower, built in 1904 as a farmhouse at what was then the edge of Beloit by J.W. Crist, who had succeeded in the Klondike gold rush.
29	Crosby Block	Crosby Block	August 1, 1985 (#85001658)	102 Allen St. 42°33′12″N 88°51′46″W	Clinton	Simple Italianate-styled commercial building with cream brick exterior and brick hood moulds over the windows, built in 1870.
30	James B. Crosby House	James B. Crosby House	December 14, 1995 (#95001454)	1005 Sutherland Ave. 42°41′41″N 89°01′27″W	Janesville	Italianate-styled house with belvedere, built in 1854 for the cashier of the Rock County National Bank. In 1878 the house became Janesville's first hospital.
31	Charles L. Culton House	Charles L. Culton House	August 22, 1977 (#77000046)	708 Washington St. 42°50′19″N 89°04′34″W	Edgerton	Large home designed by Frank H. Kemp and built in 1902 with the asymmetry and corner towers of Queen Anne style and stucco, bargeboards, and flared eaves perhaps drawn from Chateauesque style. Built for tobacco-magnate Culton.
32	De Jean House	De Jean House	September 13, 1978 (#78003388)	27 Third St. 42°46′54″N 88°57′33″W	Milton	Gabled ell house built of grout blocks in the 1860s.
33	Erastus Dean Farmstead	Erastus Dean Farmstead	December 4, 1978 (#78000131)	E of Janesville on U.S. 14; 42°39′20″N 88°52′50″W	Janesville	Probably the oldest complex of farm buildings in Rock County, begun in 1840 by the first settler in Bradford township on land he bought from the government for $1.25 per acre.
34	Homer B. DeLong House	Homer B. DeLong House	August 1, 1985 (#85001659)	500 Milwaukee Rd. 42°33′29″N 88°51′51″W	Clinton	Intact Italianate-style house built in 1869 with brick walls, Roman-arched openings, bracketed cornice and a hip roof, with the original veranda.
35	John T. Dow House	John T. Dow House	September 17, 1980 (#80000396)	SR 1; 42°50′05″N 89°14′49″W	Evansville (Cooksville)	Brick Greek Revival-styled house built in early 1850s, probably by Chambers and Lovejoy, with elliptical attic fanlight. Dow was a farmer and state legislator.
36	Eager Free Public Library	Eager Free Public Library	August 16, 1977 (#77000047)	39 W. Main St. 42°46′48″N 89°18′03″W	Evansville	Prairie Style library designed by Claude and Starck and built in 1908, with a brick body, a terra cotta frieze, and a broad hip roof clad in red tile. Named for Almeron Eager, the merchant and tobacco dealer who willed $10,000 for the public library building.
37	Almeron Eager Funerary Monument and Plot	Almeron Eager Funerary Monument and Plot	July 20, 2011 (#11000477)	8012 N. Cemetery Rd. 42°46′59″N 89°17′21″W	Evansville	Eager was a businessman and philanthropist who died in 1902, leaving funds designated to build this monument at his family plot. It was built in 1904, with its primary feature the 20-foot granite pedestal holding a sculpted woman with her hand resting on an anchor - a symbol of hope.
38	East Milwaukee Street Historic District	East Milwaukee Street Historic District	February 8, 1980 (#80000184)	N. Parker Dr. and E. Milwaukee St. 42°41′01″N 89°01′18″W	Janesville	Remnants of a historic commercial district east of the Rock River, including the 1885 Italianate-styled Hodge and Bucholz Carriage Works, the 1893 Queen Anne-style London hotel, the Merchants Hotel which was built in the 1850s and remodeled in the 1890s, the Peters Block which was begun in 1849 and remodeled to Prairie Style in 1913, and the 1915 Kronitz Meat Market.
39	Edgerton Depot	Edgerton Depot	April 13, 1998 (#98000283)	20 S. Main St. 42°50′00″N 89°04′13″W	Edgerton	Small-town depot of the Chicago, Milwaukee, St. Paul and Pacific Railroad built 1906-07 at the height of the area's tobacco trade from a design by C.F. Loweth, joining a Prairie School roof with Neoclassical columns and quoins.
40	Edgerton Post Office	Edgerton Post Office	October 24, 2000 (#00001239)	104 N. Swift St. 42°50′08″N 89°04′16″W	Edgerton	Georgian Revival-styled post office with cupola, built in 1939 with support from the PWA. Inside is the original terrazzo floor, marble wainscot, and a mural Tobacco Harvest painted by Vladimir Rousseff in 1941.
41	Edgerton Public Grade Schools	Edgerton Public Grade Schools	January 14, 1987 (#86003568)	116 N. Swift St. 42°50′09″N 89°04′11″W	Edgerton	Two 2-story buildings, with walls of cream brick, flared hip roofs and cupolas. The first was designed by G.S. Schureman and built in 1892 for grades 1-12, originally flat-roofed. In 1903 Frank Kemp designed the second, and a matching hip roof was added to the 1892 building. Served students until 1979; now apartments.
42	Emerson Hall	Emerson Hall	September 20, 1979 (#79000109)	Beloit College campus 42°30′26″N 89°01′43″W	Beloit	3.5-story women's dormitory designed by Patton & Fisher of Chicago in Jacobethan style and built 1897-1898, with shaped parapets and a 3-story bay that suggests a castle tower.
43	Evansville Historic District	Evansville Historic District	November 16, 1978 (#78000132)	roughly bounded by Allens Creek, Liberty, 4th and Garfield Sts. 42°46′46″N 89°18′10″W	Evansville	Group of relatively intact historic buildings, including the 1856 Greek Revival-style Winston & Sons store, the 1858 Greek Revival Quivey house, the 1874 Second Empire style Beebe house, the 1876 Boomtown-style Old Grange store, the 1881 Queen Anne-style Campbell house, the 1884 High Victorian Italianate Evans house, the 1886 Stick style Pullen house, and the 1903 Romanesque Revival-style First Baptist Church, and the 1904 Neoclassical new Grange store.
44	Evansville Standpipe	Evansville Standpipe	February 27, 2008 (#08000120)	288 N. 4th St. 42°47′05″N 89°18′47″W	Evansville	80-foot steel water tower built in 1901 by the Chicago Bridge & Iron Company, mainly for fire-fighting, but also to supply water to houses and businesses.
45	Fairbanks Flats	Fairbanks Flats	January 7, 1983 (#83003416)	205, 215 Birch Ave. and 206, 216 Carpenter Ave. 42°31′19″N 89°02′24″W	Beloit	Apartment complex built in 1917 by Fairbanks Morse, the engine manufacturer and largest employer in Beloit, as segregated housing for black workers who were moving up from the South. The Flats became "the nucleus of Beloit's twentieth century black community."
46	First Congregational Church	First Congregational Church	January 23, 1975 (#75000078)	801 Bushnell St. 42°30′06″N 89°01′40″W	Beloit	Congregational church built in 1859 to a design by Lucas Bradley, blending Greek Revival and Romanesque Revival styles. Destroyed by fire in 1998.
47	Footville Condensery	Footville Condensery	May 7, 1982 (#82000704)	Beloit St. 42°40′00″N 89°12′27″W	Footville	Processing plant where milk was condensed, built in 1912. Before Footville had public water or electricity, this plant provided water for local events, and electricity in 1919.
48	Footville State Bank	Footville State Bank	May 7, 1982 (#82000705)	158 Depot St. 42°40′11″N 89°12′40″W	Footville	Small Neoclassical-styled red brick building with a flat tin roof, designed by Meggot and Law and built in 1909. The bank played an important part in financing farms and stores in the village.
49	Fredendall Block	Fredendall Block	March 25, 1982 (#82000706)	33-39 S. Main St. 42°40′56″N 89°01′17″W	Janesville	3-story Italianate-styled commercial block designed by George F. Schulze and built 1868-69, with the original storefronts intact on the south half. The block originally had stores at street level and apartments above.
50	Fulton Congregational Church	Fulton Congregational Church	June 7, 1976 (#76000077)	Fulton St. 42°48′21″N 89°07′44″W	Fulton	Early brick church built in 1858, in Greek Revival style.
51	Fulton Street Historic District	Fulton Street Historic District	July 1, 1999 (#99000788)	Along Fulton St., roughly bounded by Main and Albion Sts.; 11-21 Swift St. 42°50′03″N 89°04′13″W	Edgerton	Remnants of the old downtown of Edgerton, including the ca. 1860 Bentley Dry Goods store, the 1885 Commercial Hotel, the mid-1880s Red Front Grocery Store, the late-1880s Strucker and Mays Grocery store, the 1890 Tobacco Exchange Bank, the 1916 Spike Brothers Livery, and the ca. 1916 Joe Leary Cigar Store-Badger Lunch-Atwell and Dallman Drugs building.
52	Gempeler Round Barn		June 4, 1979 (#79000110)	NW of Orfordville; 42°39′50″N 89°19′50″W	Orfordville	Round dairy barn built in 1912 for Chris Gempeler, using a massive oak trunk as the central support for the haymow floor. Demolished in 1990.
53	Gifford House	Gifford House	September 13, 1978 (#78003387)	308 Vernal; 42°46′51″N 88°57′36″W	Milton	Dignified home built with walls of grout block in the 1860s, probably by masons A. Sowles and/or Frank Smalley.
54	Gilley-Tofsland Octagonal Barn	Gilley-Tofsland Octagonal Barn	June 4, 1979 (#79000111)	NW of Edgerton; 42°50′40″N 89°10′30″W	Edgerton (Stebbinsville)	Octagonal dairy barn built into a hillside, with concrete block basement walls, wooden upper walls, and a concrete-block silo on the middle. Built in 1913 by John Almond for Will and Flora Gilley and their herd of Guernseys.
55	Goodrich Blacksmith Shop	Goodrich Blacksmith Shop	September 13, 1978 (#78003382)	28 S. Janesville St. 42°46′34″N 88°56′10″W	Milton	Simple 1-story blacksmith shop with grout walls and a pyramidal roof, just south of the Milton House, built in 1844 by Joseph Goodrich, probably right before he built the Milton House.
56	Goodrich-Buten House	Goodrich-Buten House	September 13, 1978 (#78003385)	528 E. Madison St. 42°46′38″N 88°56′22″W	Milton	1.5-story grout house with frieze windows under the eaves and a hip-roofed front porch supported by columns. Built 1850, probably by Joseph Goodrich.
57	Ezra and Elizabeth Goodrich House	Ezra and Elizabeth Goodrich House	July 14, 2015 (#15000425)	742 E. Madison Ave. 42°46′38″N 88°56′17″W	Milton	3-story cream brick Italianate-styled house designed by Ezra himself, placing oculus windows right below the eaves, built in 1867. Ezra was the son of Joseph.
58	William H. and Edith Gray Farmstead	William H. and Edith Gray Farmstead	June 30, 2015 (#15000377)	313 E. High St. 42°46′23″N 88°56′46″W	Milton	Then-progressive farm built by an experienced farmer during the industrial dairy era, including the 1911 Queen Anne/Colonial Revival-style house, a 1911 Wisconsin Dairy Barn, a 1911 poured concrete silo, and miscellaneous outbuildings.
59	Reynolds and Lois Greenman House	Reynolds and Lois Greenman House	August 23, 2016 (#16000567)	12 Merchant Row; 42°46′59″N 88°57′44″W	Milton	Italianate-style house with bracketed eaves and cupola, built in 1866 to showcase the products of Greenman's lumber yard. Greenman later co-owned the Milton Junction News and served on various local boards.
60	Grove Street Historic District	Grove Street Historic District	August 10, 2011 (#11000531)	103, 111, 112, 116, 119, 125, 126, 133 & 134 Grove St. 42°47′00″N 89°18′08″W	Evansville	Concentration of nine quality historic homes in various architectural styles, built from 1910 to 1946 near Leonard/Lake Leota Park.
61	Hanchett Block	Hanchett Block	March 20, 1980 (#80000185)	307 State St. 42°29′56″N 89°02′08″W	Beloit	4-story Victorian structure built in 1856 by James Hanchett, with stores below and an auditorium in the top two stories. Lincoln spoke in the auditorium during his Presidential campaign in 1859. It was also a Republican meeting place and the site where the Beloit Guards enlisted in the Civil War, in 1861. The facade was extensively remodeled between 1893 and 1904.
62	Haven-Crandall House	Haven-Crandall House	August 29, 2016 (#16000575)	220 S. Janesville St. 42°46′29″N 88°56′12″W	Milton	Elegant brick Italianate-styled house built in 1872 by H.M. Haven. Later home to Albert Crandall, professor of natural history at Milton College. His daughter Alberta was a music prof at Milton and gave piano lessons in the house until 1970.
63	Hilton House Hotel	Hilton House Hotel	November 7, 2003 (#03001128)	444 E. Grand Ave. 42°29′58″N 89°02′02″W	Beloit	3-story hotel with U-shaped footprint designed in Neoclassical style by Frost and Granger and built in 1904. It featured fireproof construction, some rooms with private baths, a dining room, and saloon. Hosted William Jennings Bryan and John F. Kennedy. Now used as luxury apartments on upper floors, with commercial use on the first floor.
64	How-Beckman Mill	How-Beckman Mill	September 7, 1977 (#77000049)	11600 County Highway H 42°30′38″N 89°10′12″W	Beloit	3-story timber-framed mill built in 1858 by Charles Goodhue. Later run as a flouring mill by William How and Catherine Beckman until 1954.
65	John and Martha Hugunin House	John and Martha Hugunin House	June 1, 2005 (#05000534)	2739 Beloit Ave. 42°38′23″N 89°00′40″W	Janesville	High style cream brick Italianate farmhouse built in 1875, with a simpler 1868 frame farmhouse attached behind. The Hugunins were farmers who came from New York around 1850 and succeeded at growing wheat on the Rock Prairie. Demolished in 2018.
66	Janesville Cotton Mill	Janesville Cotton Mill	July 16, 1980 (#80000186)	220 N. Franklin St. 42°41′02″N 89°01′39″W	Janesville	Cream brick factory complex begun in 1874, with 3-story main block and 5-story central tower which held a freight elevator. Housed 400 looms powered by water from the Rock River on which German and Irish women and girls wove cotton shipped up from the South.
67	Janesville High School	Janesville High School	June 25, 1999 (#99000760)	408 S. Main St. 42°40′40″N 89°01′02″W	Janesville	3-story brown brick school designed in Collegiate Gothic style by Van Ryn & DeGelleke and built 1921-23 - modern for its day, with an auditorium and swimming pool. Later served as Marshall Junior High School.
68	Janesville Public Library	Janesville Public Library	July 1, 1981 (#81000057)	64 S. Main St. 42°40′53″N 89°01′15″W	Janesville	Carnegie library designed in Neoclassical style by J.T.W. Jennings and built in 1902-03, with its children's room funded by local businessman F.S. Eldred in memory of his daughter.
69	Janesville Pumping Station	Janesville Pumping Station	March 7, 1985 (#85000494)	500 Blk. River St. 42°40′48″N 89°01′22″W	Janesville	Red brick Queen Anne-styled structure, with its oldest section designed by Ernest Boynton and built in 1887 as part of Janesville's early waterworks. Additions followed in 1915, 1918, 1921 & 1930.
70	Jefferson Avenue Historic District	Jefferson Avenue Historic District	April 19, 2006 (#06000300)	Bounded by Oakland, Garfield and Ruger Aves. and Forest Park Blvd. 42°41′10″N 89°00′40″W	Janesville	Neighborhood of middle-class and upper-middle-class homes built from 1891 to the 1930s in most of the styles of that period.
71	John H. Jones House	John H. Jones House	March 14, 2008 (#08000186)	538 S. Main St. 42°40′36″N 89°00′56″W	Janesville	Exuberant Queen-Anne-style house built in 1890 for merchant Jones, with carriage house behind.
72	Samuel S. Jones Cobblestone House	Samuel S. Jones Cobblestone House	February 23, 1978 (#78000133)	E of Clinton on Milwaukee Rd. 42°33′57″N 88°49′02″W	Clinton	Large Greek Revival-style farmhouse clad in cobblestone, built in the late 1840s.
73	Kinney Farmstead-Tay-e-he-Dah Site	Kinney Farmstead-Tay-e-he-Dah Site	February 17, 1978 (#78000134)	1612 E. Hotel Dr. 42°50′32″N 89°00′17″W	Edgerton	Site where fourteen mounds stood on the shore of Lake Koshkonong. Since occupied by an early farm and the Lake House Inn.
74	Lappin-Hayes Block	Lappin-Hayes Block	November 7, 1976 (#76000224)	20 E. Milwaukee St. 42°40′58″N 89°01′21″W	Janesville	4-story commercial building built in 1855 with Italianate styling, with five stores at street level and offices and an auditorium above. Renovated in 1899 under the direction of Arthur Peabody, adding the Queen Anne-styled round corner towers and touted as Janesville's "first modern office building."
75	LaPrairie Grange Hall No. 79	LaPrairie Grange Hall No. 79	April 11, 1977 (#77000050)	SE of Janesville on Town Hall Rd. 42°37′37″N 88°57′12″W	Janesville	2-story wooden hall built in 1874 by the local Grange, a fraternal organization of farmers. Now one of the oldest remaining Grange halls in the country.
76	Lathrop-Munn Cobblestone House	Lathrop-Munn Cobblestone House	August 22, 1977 (#77000051)	524 Bluff St. 42°30′03″N 89°02′31″W	Beloit	1.5-story Greek Revival-styled house built about 1848, clad in carefully-arranged cobblestones.
77	Leonard—Leota Park	Leonard—Leota Park	September 4, 2012 (#12000610)	20, 30, 40, 50, ca 60, 120, 121 Antes Dr., 321, 340, 359, 360, 363, 365, 395 Burr W. Jones Cir., Leonard Park Dr. 42°47′07″N 89°18′06″W	Evansville	Allen's Creek was dammed in 1847 to create Lake Leota and power Evansville's mills. Leonard Park above it was started in 1883 - the town's first park. The park was expanded and as make-work programs during the Great Depression landscaped and equipped with the Rustic-style limestone bell tower, shelter house, firepalces, etc.
78	Look West Historic District	Look West Historic District	March 26, 1987 (#87000506)	Roughly bounded by Mineral Point Ave., N. Franklin and Race Sts., Laurel Ave., and N. Chatham St. 42°41′03″N 89°02′00″W	Janesville	Large historic neighborhood northwest of Janesville's old downtown, including the c. 1855 Greek Revival Sleeper house, the 1855 Gothic Revival Williams house, the 1857 Italianate-style Tallman house, the 1873 Gothic Revival Norwegian Evangelical Lutheran Church, the 1871 CM&SP depot, the 1889 Queen Anne-style Sutherland house, the 1900 Colonial Revival Rau house, the 1901 Green's Tobacco Warehouse, the 1904 American Foursquare house at 222 N Terrace, and the 1920 Owen bungalow.
79	Lovejoy and Merrill-Nowlan Houses	Lovejoy and Merrill-Nowlan Houses	January 21, 1980 (#80000187)	220 and 202 St. Lawrence Ave. 42°40′55″N 89°01′07″W	Janesville	Two large adjacent houses eventually owned by the YWCA. Lovejoy is Queen Anne style, built around 1881. Merrill-Nowlan was built around 1882, Georgian Revival style.
80	Masonic Temple	Masonic Temple	July 21, 2015 (#15000458)	508 Vernal Ave. 42°46′51″N 88°57′47″W	Milton	2-story meeting house in Classical Revival style, built by the Milton Freemasons in 1917.
81	Peter McEwan Warehouse	Peter McEwan Warehouse	September 13, 1978 (#78003384)	711 E. High St. 42°46′22″N 88°56′19″W	Milton	Grout-walled structure with Greek Revival styling, built around 1840 by Peter McEwan, probably as a grain warehouse. Converted to a home by Valerius Anderson around 1858.
82	Merchant Row Historic District	Merchant Row Historic District	August 3, 2015 (#15000504)	212, 216, 218-220, 228-230 Merchant Row & 553, 537, 541 Vernal Ave. 42°46′54″N 88°57′48″W	Milton	A fairly intact section of the downtown of old Milton Junction, a farmer's hub where the tracks crossed a mile west of Milton itself. Includes the 1880 Seeger Millinery, the 1890 Button block (pictured), the 1897 Kelly Block, the 1899 Seeger block, and the 1926 Gates Block.
83	Merrill Avenue Historic District	Merrill Avenue Historic District	February 19, 1993 (#93000028)	103, 107, 111, 115 Merrill Ave. 42°30′34″N 89°02′13″W	Beloit	Four one-story "Brasstown cottages" with full front porches, built in 1891 to factory workers. 103 Merrill Ave. is probably the most intact.
84	Miller House	Miller House	September 17, 1980 (#80000399)	SR 1; 42°49′40″N 89°14′25″W	Evansville (Cooksville)	1845 Greek Revival-style house with vermillion brick walls and wood cornice.
85	Milton College Historic District	Milton College Historic District	May 27, 1980 (#80000188)	College St. 42°46′27″N 88°56′32″W	Milton	Milton College was a private college which trained many teachers, founded by Joseph Goodrich in the 1840s, with early ties to Seventh Day Baptists. It closed in 1982 but historic buildings survive, including the 1850 Fraser House, the 1854 Italianate-style Main Hall, 1857 Goodrich Hall dormitory, 1867 Elder Whitford House, and the 1904 Neoclassical-styled Whitford Memorial Hall.
86	Milton House	Milton House	February 1, 1972 (#72000065)	18 S. Janesville St. 42°46′37″N 88°56′11″W	Milton	3-story hexagonal grout-walled stagecoach stop built in 1845 by Joseph Goodrich at the junction of two early roads. Goodrich was an abolitionist, and a tunnel between the house and a cabin behind served as a stop on the Underground Railroad.
87	Moran's Saloon	Moran's Saloon	January 7, 1983 (#83003417)	312 State St. 42°29′57″N 89°02′09″W	Beloit	Italianate-styled saloon built in 1880 by barkeeper Thomas Moran, with the 2nd-story windows framed in elaborate brick arches, little-changed since built.
88	Mouth of the Yahara Archeological District	Mouth of the Yahara Archeological District	April 28, 1975 (#75000079)	Address Restricted	Fulton	Site of a prehistoric Indian village.
89	Murray-George House	Murray-George House	September 13, 1985 (#85002125)	SR P 42°30′33″N 88°56′18″W	Beloit	Greek Revival-styled 2-story house clad in small cobblestones, built by farmer George Murray starting in 1845.
90	Peter Myers Pork Packing Plant and Willard Coleman Building	Peter Myers Pork Packing Plant and Willard Coleman Building	July 7, 1983 (#83003418)	117-123 N. Main St. 42°41′03″N 89°01′26″W	Janesville	Block of old Italianate-style brick buildings built in the 1850s.
91	Myers-Newhoff House	Myers-Newhoff House	May 18, 1979 (#79000277)	121 N. Parker Dr. 42°41′05″N 89°01′22″W	Janesville	2-story brick Greek Revival-styled home built in 1848 by Peter Myers, a French-born businessman. Aaron Newhoff was a sales clerk or clothier who bought the house in 1858.
92	Near East Side Historic District	Near East Side Historic District	January 7, 1983 (#83003419)	Roughly bounded by Pleasant, Clary Sts., Wisconsin and E. Grand Aves. 42°30′10″N 89°01′40″W	Beloit	Neighborhood composed of stylish homes of prominent citizens from the 1800s and the buildings of Beloit College.
93	Elbert Neese House		January 7, 1983 (#83003420)	1302 Bushnell St; 42°30′04″N 89°01′15″W	Beloit	Built in 1895 by L.B. Merrill of Beloit Iron Works. Transformed to Tudor Revival style by Elbert and Laura Neese starting in 1916. Neese was President of Beloit Corporation when it was the preeminent manufacturer of paper-making machinery and the largest employer in Beloit.
94	North Main Street Historic District	North Main Street Historic District	February 8, 1980 (#80000189)	N. Main St. and N. Parker Dr. 42°41′02″N 89°01′23″W	Janesville	Fairly-intact fragment of Janesville's old downtown where small buildings predominated, including the 1851 Italianate-style Peter Myers Pork Plant, the small 1855 Greek Revival building at 21 1/2 N Main, the 1866 Italianate Odd Fellows meeting hall, and the 1936 Art Deco Salvation Army building.
95	Sterling North House	Sterling North House	January 9, 1997 (#96001579)	409 W. Rollin St. 42°50′14″N 89°04′04″W	Edgerton	The house where author North grew up, and where many of the events in his book Rascal took place. Now a museum.
96	Clark Nye House	Clark Nye House	January 7, 1983 (#83003422)	2501 Spring Creek Rd. 42°31′34″N 89°04′45″W	Beloit	Small 1.5-story farmhouse built by pioneer farmer Nye in 1846, in Greek Revival style, with walls of rough limestone blocks that Nye quarried on his own farm.
97	Old Fourth Ward Historic District	Old Fourth Ward Historic District	May 30, 1990 (#90000789)	Roughly bounded by Washington St., Center Ave., Court St., Franklin St., and Monterey Park; 42°40′24″N 89°01′45″W	Janesville	Large working-class neighborhood southwest of Janesville's downtown, with some stylish homes on the north built by early businessmen near their interests downtown, and the other historic homes mostly modest working class built from the 1840s to 1930.
98	Orfordville Depot	Orfordville Depot	October 13, 1988 (#88002004)	Beloit St. 42°37′41″N 89°15′22″W	Orfordville	Railroad depot built by the Chicago, Milwaukee and St. Paul Railroad Railroad in 1886 in a style that combines Stick and Italianate.
99	John and Margaret Owen House	John and Margaret Owen House	August 23, 2016 (#16000568)	33 2nd St. 42°46′54″N 88°57′38″W	Milton	Large Queen Anne-style house built in 1894 for one of the partners in Chambers and Owen, as that company was growing into the largest tobacco trader in Milton.
100	William J. Owen Store	William J. Owen Store	May 7, 1982 (#82000707)	220 Depot St. 42°40′11″N 89°12′40″W	Footville	Oldest store building in Footville, built in Greek Revival style before 1860 and moved twice since, with full pediment and corner pilasters.
101	J. L. Pangborn House	J. L. Pangborn House	August 1, 1985 (#85001664)	300 Allen St. 42°33′20″N 88°51′47″W	Clinton	2.5-story Queen Anne-style house with bay windows, fish-scale shingles, and an asymmetric porch decorated with spindle work. Built in 1893 for the local merchant.
102	Parkview Historic District	Parkview Historic District	August 3, 2015 (#15000505)	644-655 College St. & 247-319 Parkview Dr. 42°46′27″N 88°56′22″W	Milton	The downtown of Old Milton, including the 1890 cream brick Dunn Block, the 1915 Crandall-Maxon hardware store (pictured), the 1916 Rogers-Crossley-Whittet Block, the 1921 Lipke Brothers agricultural implement store, the 1922 Babcock Dental Office, and the 1941 Colonial Revival-styled Crosley Medical Office.
103	Payne-Craig House	Payne-Craig House	July 2, 1987 (#87000990)	2200 W. Memorial Dr. 42°41′44″N 89°02′52″W	Janesville	2-story Italianate-style house topped with a glazed observatory, in a park-like yard. Started in 1858 as a Greek Revival farmhouse built by gentleman farmer Christopher Arnold on his 60 acre farm. William Payne, president of Janesville Woolen Mills, added the Italianate-style front block around 1869. Later owned by Joseph Craig, the head of Janesville Machine Co. as it became GM's Chevrolet division in 1923. Craig was also a gentleman farmer, raising champion Jerseys.
104	Pearsons Hall of Science	Pearsons Hall of Science	June 30, 1980 (#80000190)	Beloit College campus 42°30′13″N 89°01′53″W	Beloit	Brick Romanesque Revival academic hall built 1892-1893, which marked an expansion of the science curriculum at Beloit College.
105	Pomeroy and Pelton Tobacco Warehouse	Pomeroy and Pelton Tobacco Warehouse	July 9, 1998 (#98000848)	1 W. Fulton St. 42°50′00″N 89°04′10″W	Edgerton	Brick warehouse built in 1885 by W.T. Pomeroy. Tobacco was sorted in the basement, "sweated" on the 2nd floor and stored on the first floor. Also known as Dickinson Tobacco Warehouse.
106	J. K. Porter Farmstead	J. K. Porter Farmstead	September 17, 1980 (#80000400)	SR 1; 42°50′09″N 89°13′35″W	Evansville (Cooksville)	2-story Greek Revival-styled house begun in 1847 by a member of the founding family of the Town of Porter, along with other Porter houses and an 1870 2-story horse barn.
107	Prospect Hill Historic District	Prospect Hill Historic District	November 5, 1992 (#92001558)	Roughly bounded by Eisenhower, Prospect and Atwood Aves., Milwaukee St., Parker Dr. and Centerway; 42°41′10″N 89°01′16″W	Janesville	Large neighborhood NE of the downtown on a rise east of the Rock River, including the 1847 Italianate-style Lawrence house, the 1860 gabled-ell house at 445 Cornelia St, the 1870 Gothic Revival Nowlan house, the 1893 Queen Anne-style Palmer house, the 1901 High Victorian Gothic St. Mary's Catholic Church, the 1916 Sheldon bungalow, the 1920 American Foursquare Homsey house, and the 1928 Tudor Revival Gagan house,
108	Brewster Randall House	Brewster Randall House	March 1, 1984 (#84003782)	1412 Ruger Ave. 42°41′10″N 89°00′19″W	Janesville	2-story frame house built in 1862 by Garrie Nettleton with the rather simple window heads and door framing of Greek Revival and the broad bracketed eaves of Italianate style. Brewster Randall was a lawyer who served as president of Ohio's State Senate before retiring to Janesville.
109	Rasey House	Rasey House	December 27, 1974 (#74000123)	517 Prospect St. 42°30′05″N 89°01′50″W	Beloit	1.5-story Greek Revival-styled house clad in cobblestones gathered from Turtle Creek. Built around 1850 with donated labor and materials as a fund-raiser for Beloit College.
110	Charles Rau House	Charles Rau House	January 7, 1983 (#83003423)	757 Euclid Ave. 42°30′01″N 89°02′56″W	Beloit	2.5-story Queen Anne-style house with some Stick style decoration, built in 1891 for Charles Rau, owner of a furniture store.
111	Richardson Grout House	Richardson Grout House	September 17, 1980 (#80000402)	SR 1; 42°49′06″N 89°12′41″W	Evansville (Cooksville)	Simple 1.5-story cottage, built 1850 with walls of grout, by Alexander Richardson.
112	Hamilton Richardson House	Hamilton Richardson House	July 17, 1978 (#78000135)	429 Prospect Ave. 42°41′14″N 89°01′13″W	Janesville	Fine 2-story cream brick house in Italian Villa style, with broad eaves, round-arched openings, bulls-eye windows in the gable ends, and a fanciful front porch. Built around 1873 for Richardson, a principal of Doty Mfg., state legislator, and postmaster of Janesville.
113	Richardson-Brinkman Cobblestone House	Richardson-Brinkman Cobblestone House	July 28, 1977 (#77000052)	607 W. Milwaukee Rd. 42°33′27″N 88°51′58″W	Clinton	Greek Revival-style house clad in cobblestones, built in 1843 by Alonso Richardson. Now owned and operated as a museum by the Clinton Community Historical Society.
114	Rindfleisch Building	Rindfleisch Building	January 7, 1983 (#83003424)	512 E. Grand Ave. 42°29′58″N 89°02′00″W	Beloit	Very intact 3-story brick commercial building built 1926-27.
115	Risum Round Barn	Risum Round Barn	June 4, 1979 (#79000112)	Southwest of Orfordville; 42°35′55″N 89°17′35″W	Orfordville	Early wooden round barn, built around 1890.
116	John C. and Mary Robinson Farmstead	John C. and Mary Robinson Farmstead	January 7, 2010 (#09001221)	18002 W. County Trunk Highway C 42°47′14″N 89°21′26″W	Union	Farm of a family of prominent stock-breeders, including a pre-1900 timber-framed sheep shed, 1900 Queen Anne-style farmhouse, a 1915 gambrel-roofed cattle barn, a granary built in the 1920s, and a 1932 gambrel-roofed barn. The Robinsons bred Hereford cattle, Shropshire sheep, Berkshire hogs and Clydesdale horses, and John was the brother of the Impressionist painter Theodore Robinson.
117	Roosevelt Elementary School		April 1, 2025 (#100011593)	316 South Ringold Street; 42°40′58″N 89°00′27″W	Janesville	Public school designed by Law, Law & Potter in Georgian Revival style. Built in 1929 and adapted in 1939, 1952 and 1969.
118	St. John's Lutheran Church	St. John's Lutheran Church	August 14, 2012 (#12000521)	312 S. 3rd St. 42°46′34″N 89°18′21″W	Evansville	1957 church designed by John Steinmann, inspired by Frank Lloyd Wright's Usonian houses.
119	Seventh Day Baptist Church	Seventh Day Baptist Church	August 22, 2016 (#16000569)	720 E. Madison Ave. 42°46′37″N 88°56′15″W	Milton	Late Gothic Revival-styled church designed by Hugo Haeuser and built in 1933 for Milton's influential Seventh Day Baptist congregation.
120	Shopiere Congregational Church	Shopiere Congregational Church	August 13, 1976 (#76000078)	Buss Rd., near Shopiere Rd. 42°34′14″N 88°56′17″W	Shopiere	Congregational church built starting in 1850, with its limestone main block in Greek Revival style and the New England-styled tower and steeple added later.
121	Stephen Slaymaker House	Stephen Slaymaker House	January 7, 1983 (#83003425)	348 Euclid Ave. 42°29′59″N 89°02′32″W	Beloit	2-story Queen Anne-style house built 1886 or '87, with fish-scale shingles covering the second story and Stick style decoration in the gable ends. Slaymaker was a carpenter for Beloit Iron works, and he may have built the house.
122	Samuel Smiley House	Samuel Smiley House	October 21, 1982 (#82001849)	SE of Orfordville on WI 213; 42°35′59″N 89°12′25″W	Orfordville	Ca. 1846 2-story Greek Revival-styled farmhouse reminiscent of Federal style. Smiley was a bridge builder from Pennsylvania who came to Wisconsin later in life and became a local civic leader.
123	John Smith House	John Smith House	August 1, 1985 (#85001663)	312 Pleasant St. 42°33′24″N 88°52′04″W	Clinton	Brick Italianate-styled house built in 1869.
124	South First Street Residential Historic District	South First Street Residential Historic District	August 10, 2011 (#11000532)	341, 348, 349, 402, 408, 409, 412, 419, 433, 439 & 443, S. 1st St. 42°46′29″N 89°18′03″W	Evansville	String of stylish old houses including the 1885 Stick style Mihills house, the 1885 Queen Anne-style Gillies house with its mansard-roofed tower, the 1885 Queen Anne Hoxie House (pictured), the 1900 Dutch Colonial Revival Hoxie Spec house, and the 1910 Queen Anne Holmes house.
125	South Main Street Historic District	South Main Street Historic District	June 1, 1990 (#90000820)	Roughly S. Main St. from Milwaukee St. to Rock Co. Courthouse grounds and E. Court St. from Parker Dr. to Rock R. 42°40′55″N 89°01′17″W	Janesville	Fairly intact remnant of the old downtown east of the Rock River, with contributing properties built in various styles from 1851 into the 1900s.
126	St. Paul's Episcopal Church	St. Paul's Episcopal Church	April 4, 1978 (#78000136)	212 W. Grand Ave. 42°30′05″N 89°02′22″W	Beloit	Gothic Revival-style church built 1848-1851 by Episcopal congregation - the oldest church in continuous use in Rock County and one of the oldest surviving stone Gothic churches in Wisconsin.
127	Stark-Clint House	Stark-Clint House	September 13, 1985 (#85002124)	Creek Rd. 42°35′04″N 88°55′32″W	Tiffany	Cobblestone-clad farmhouse built in 1846, with limestone quoins, sills, and lintels, and built for William H. Stark, later a state legislator.
128	Harrison Stebbins House		September 17, 1980 (#80000401)	SR 1; 42°49′36″N 89°12′55″W	Evansville (Cooksville)	Now-demolished Federal style house with walls of limestone block, built in 1850 by Harrison Stebbins, teacher, surveyor, progressive farmer, and member of the state legislature.
129	Soloman J. Strang House	Soloman J. Strang House	May 7, 1982 (#82000708)	231 North Gilbert; 42°40′25″N 89°12′32″W	Footville	Cream brick Italianate-styled house built in 1883 by Strang, who farmed and ran a general store, a feed mill, and coal yard. First house in Footville to get electricity.
130	Strong Building	Strong Building	January 7, 1983 (#83003426)	400-408 E. Grand Ave. 42°29′58″N 89°02′07″W	Beloit	4-story retail and office building built in 1929 by F.M. Strong. The design by Oman & Lillienthal of Chicago, with glazed, colored terra cotta façade and flower ornaments makes it the "most distinctive Art Deco building in the city."
131	Strong Partridge Mound Group	Strong Partridge Mound Group	March 1, 1994 (#94000057)	1750 Arrowhead Dr. 42°31′09″N 89°00′37″W	Beloit	A turtle effigy mound and an oval mound along Turtle Creek built by Woodland people - remnants of a larger mound group. Now in Totem Mound Park.
132	John and Eleanor Strunk House	John and Eleanor Strunk House	March 11, 2008 (#08000184)	2306 N. Parker Dr. 42°42′38″N 89°01′59″W	Janesville	Greek Revival-style house built in 1844 on what was then a farm above the Rock River by the Strunks, Yankee farmers who came from New York a few years before. Walls with quoins are built of limestone from the nearby Chapin quarry.
133	Tallman House	Tallman House	October 15, 1970 (#70000085)	440 N. Jackson St. 42°41′10″N 89°01′53″W	Janesville	Italian Villa style home built in 1857 for lawyer and abolitionist William Tallman. Abraham Lincoln spent two nights here after speaking at the Wisconsin State Fair in 1859, before he was elected president.
134	A. E. Taylor House	A. E. Taylor House	August 1, 1985 (#85001662)	318 Durand St. 42°33′25″N 88°51′51″W	Clinton	1.5-story frame home built in 1884 with jerkinhead gables, decorated bargeboards, and Stick style framing around the windows. The shed roof dormers and knee-braces under the eaves seem to draw from the bungalow style which wouldn't become popular in Wisconsin for twenty years.
135	Turtleville Iron Bridge	Turtleville Iron Bridge	September 15, 1977 (#77000053)	N of Beloit on Lathers Rd. 42°33′56″N 88°57′52″W	Beloit	Overhead truss bridge across Turtle Creek, built in 1887 before the transition from wrought iron to steel. A remnant of the ghost town of Turtleville.
136	Washington Elementary School		April 1, 2025 (#100011594)	811 North Pine Street; 42°41′30″N 89°02′24″W	Janesville	Public school designed by Law, Law & Potter in Classical Revival style, influenced by Stripped Classicism. Built in 1939 with support from the Public Works Administration, with additions in 1952 and 1992.
137	West Luther Valley Lutheran Church	West Luther Valley Lutheran Church	May 27, 1980 (#80000191)	SW of Orfordville on W. Church Rd. 42°36′26″N 89°19′35″W	Orfordville	Rural frame church built in 1871 by its Norwegian immigrant congregation, with connections to Rev. Claus Clausen and the formation of the Synod of the Norwegian Evangelical Lutheran Church in America.
138	West Milwaukee Street Historic District	West Milwaukee Street Historic District	May 17, 1990 (#90000790)	Roughly bounded by Wall, River, Court, and Academy Sts. 42°40′52″N 89°01′33″W	Janesville	Remnants of Janesville's historic downtown west of the Rock River, including the 1869 Italianate-styled Durkee Hardware Store, the 1875 Gothic Revival-style First Congregational Church, the 1876 Carroll Meat Market, the 1885 Italianate Mackin Saloon, the 1890 Queen Anne-styled Williams block, the 1891 Queen Anne-styled First Presbyterian Church, the 1892 Wright Hides and Findings store, the 1925 Mediterranean Revival-styled YMCA, the 1929 Art Deco-styled Monterey Hotel, and the 1938 Art Moderne-styled U.S. Post Office.
139	Whiton-Parker House	Whiton-Parker House	February 8, 2016 (#15001056)	1000 E. Milwaukee St. 42°41′17″N 89°00′45″W	Janesville	Grand Greek Revival-style home built in early 1850s for Edward V. Whiton, first Chief Justice of Wisconsin's Supreme Court, among other posts. Kenneth Parker lived here from 1925-60, while Parker Pen grew.
140	Frances Willard Schoolhouse	Frances Willard Schoolhouse	October 5, 1977 (#77000054)	Craig Ave. 42°41′29″N 89°00′19″W	Janesville	One-room schoolhouse built in 1853, where social reformer Frances Willard studied and taught.
141	Wyman-Rye Farmstead	Wyman-Rye Farmstead	November 7, 1977 (#77000055)	N of Clinton on Wyman-Rye Dr. 42°35′28″N 88°52′18″W	Clinton	A massive limestone-walled barn built in 1857 and a cream brick Italianate villa built in 1872. Both were built by William Wyman, carpenter and sheep farmer.
142	Florence Yates House	Florence Yates House	January 7, 1983 (#83003427)	1614 Emerson St. 42°30′16″N 89°00′59″W	Beloit	2.5-story red brick Georgian Revival-style house designed by Chester Wolfley and built in 1927 for Florence, the daughter of P.B. Yates, founder of Yates-American Machine Company, which made woodworking machinery and was one of Beloit's larger manufacturers.

== Formerly listed ==
	Name on the Register	Image	Date listed	Date removed	Location	City or town	Description
1	Belle Cottage		May 8, 1979 (#79000107)	May 18, 1987	1837 Center Ave.	Janesville	Gothic revival-styled house clad in local cobblestones, built by George Josiah Kellog in 1854. A.k.a. Damrow House. Demolished February 27, 1987.
2	Carlton Hotel		October 3, 1988 (#88002173)	March 6, 1992	14 N. Henry St.	Edgerton	3-story German Renaissance Revival hotel designed by Frank H. Kemp and built in 1898. Destroyed by fire on September 9, 1991.
3	Dean-Armstrong-Englund Octagonal Barn		June 4, 1979 (#79003769)	March 30, 1984		Milton	Early round barn built in 1893 by Silas Dean, with a windmill-type ventilation system in its central cupola. Destroyed by fire on August 10, 1983.
4	Dougan Round Barn	Dougan Round Barn	June 4, 1979 (#79000108)	January 30, 2014	444 West Colley Rd.	Beloit	Built in 1911 by carpenter Mark Keller for pastor-farmer Wesson Dougan, following ideas of Professor F.H. King. Demolished in 2012.
5	J.B. Dow House and Carpenter Douglas Barn		January 7, 1983 (#83003415)	May 12, 2009	910 Board St.	Beloit	The Dow house was a mix of Colonial Revival and Queen Anne styles, built in 1905. Dow was a realtor, lawyer and insurance salesman. Damaged by fire September 1996, demolished. The 1847 barn is clad in cobblestone with limestone quoins.
6	Elijah Goodrich Wheat Warehouse		September 13, 1978 (#78003389)	June 15, 1984	602 E. Madison St.	Milton	Grout-walled 2-story structure built in 1850 and demolished in 1984.
7	Leedle Mill Truss Bridge	Leedle Mill Truss Bridge	September 17, 1980 (#80000398)	January 9, 2013	SR 1; 42°50′37″N 89°15′09″W	Evansville	Iron overhead Pratt truss bridge over Spring Creek built in 1916 by E.C. Sherwin and Son. Demolished in 2011.
8	Myers Opera House		June 17, 1977 (#77001583)	March 15, 1978	118 E. Milwaukee St.	Janesville	Italianate-style brick concert hall built in 1870 and demolished in 1977.
9	Wisconsin School for the Blind-Music Building		March 13, 1987 (#87000440)	February 17, 1989	1700 W. State St.	Janesville	Brick Italianate-style structure designed by Russel Howland and built in 1909. Demolished in 1989.
10	Wright-Amato House		June 30, 1971 (#71001095)	June 20, 1972	923 Mineral Point Ave.	Janesville	Federal-style house designed by Warren Robinson and built in the mid-1800s. Demolished on June 8, 1972.

== See also ==
- List of National Historic Landmarks in Wisconsin
- National Register of Historic Places listings in Wisconsin
- Listings in neighboring counties: Boone (IL), Dane, Green, Jefferson, Walworth, Winnebago (IL)
