= Grove Street Historic District =

Grove Street Historic District may refer to the following places:

- Grove Street Historic District (Barneveld, Wisconsin), listed on the National Register of Historic Places
- Grove Street Historic District (Evansville, Wisconsin), listed on the National Register of Historic Places
