= Gaarder =

Gaarder is a Norwegian surname. Notable people with the surname include:

- Inger Margrethe Gaarder (1926–1993), Norwegian writer
- Jon Atle Gaarder (1934–2020), Norwegian diplomat
- Jostein Gaarder (born 1952), Norwegian writer
- Mikkel Gaarder, Norwegian Paralympic athlete
- Ole P. Gaarder (1844-1927), American politician and farmer
- Peder Krabbe Gaarder (1814–1883), Norwegian jurist and political theorist
- Shabana Rehman Gaarder (born 1976), Norwegian comedian and writer
- Torbjørn Gaarder (1885–1970), Norwegian chemist
