= Risum =

Risum may refer to

- Risong Township, in Tibet;
- Risum-Lindholm, a municipality in Germany.

== See also ==
- Risum Round Barn
