= West Luther Valley Lutheran Church =

Historic church in Wisconsin, United States

- U.S. National Register of Historic Places
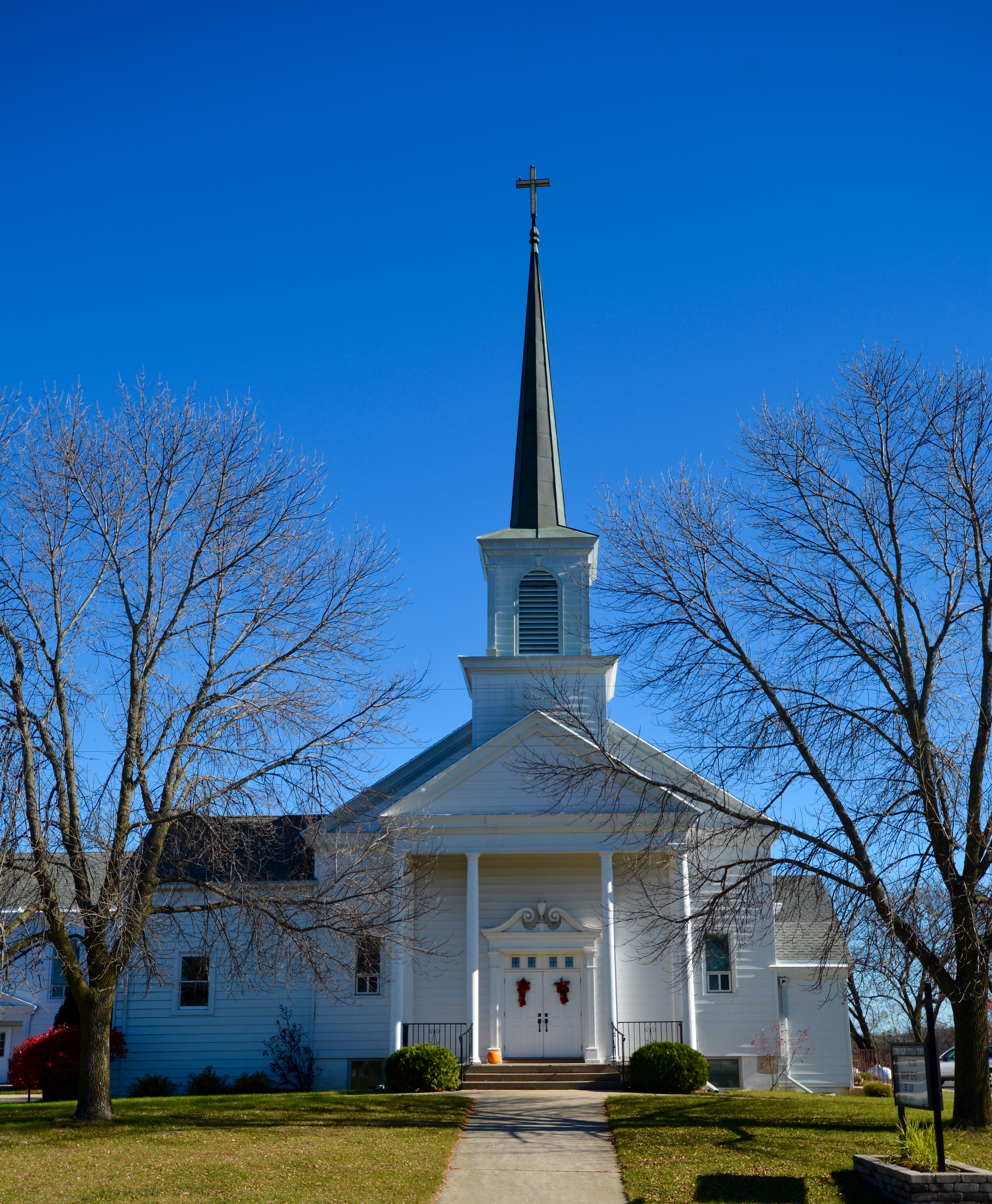

- Location within Wisconsin Location within the United States
- Nearest city: Orfordville, Wisconsin
- Coordinates: 42°36′26″N 89°19′35″W
- Area: 0.6 acres (0.24 ha)
- Built: 1872
- Architect: Bjornstad, Anders
- NRHP reference No.: 80000191
- Added to NRHP: May 27, 1980

West Luther Valley Lutheran Church is a historic church built in 1871 in the Norwegian immigrant farm community southwest of Orfordville, Wisconsin on West Church Rd. In 1980 the church was added to the National Register of Historic Places as a remnant of that Norwegian community and for its association with the prominent Rev. Claus Clausen.

The first Norwegian immigrants in the area then called Rock Prairie arrived in 1839. In 1844 Pastor Claus Lauritz Clausen visited from Muskego and conducted services for his Norwegian brethren in Skavlem's stone house. A congregation formed and they called Clausen to be their pastor. He arrived in 1846 and gave half his salary toward building the first Luther Valley Church - a stone building 28 by 44 feet, furnished with a home-made altar, pews, baptismal font and pulpit. Meetings of Norwegian Lutheran leaders from the upper Midwest were held at this East church in 1851 and 1853 at which the Synod of the Norwegian Evangelical Lutheran Church in America was organized. Luther College was also planned here, at a meeting in 1861.

Clausen stepped down as pastor in 1851 and switched to publishing Norwegian language newspapers out of a stone print shop near the East Church: the church paper Maanedstidende and the secular paper Emigranten. He also served as superintendent of the Norwegian Synod from 1851 to 1852. In 1853 Clausen went to Iowa, but returned from time to time to conduct services. Clausen served as chaplain of the 15th Wisconsin Regiment in the Civil War and in 1861 led a church faction that declared slavery a sin. In 1868 he resigned from the Norwegian Synod over the matter. He eventually joined the Norwegian-Danish Conference, as did the Luther Valley church.

By 1871 the Luther Valley congregation had outgrown its stone church, and built two frame church buildings: the East Luther Valley Church on the site of the stone church, and the West Luther Valley Church which is the subject of this article. The west church was added as a branch congregation for the convenience of families that lived out that way. Both churches were built by Anders Bjornstad, born at Toten, Norway. The head carpenter of the west church was Jesse Woodward.

The West Church was a modest, fairly typical country church - a frame structure clad in white clapboard on a limestone foundation, with four tall windows with clear glass on each side. Above the front entry was a square tower supporting a smaller square belfry. Inside, a choir loft spanned above the front entry. When the West church was built in 1871, the old church furniture from the East church was moved there, including the altar with a locally made reredos, the railings, pulpit, baptismal font, wooden pews, and two "pens" for the pastor's assistants. These furnishings were probably present in the East church for the meetings that formed the Norwegian Synod.

The church changed over the years. A kitchen wing was added, probably around 1900. The enclosed porch was added around 1907. About 1950 the congregation added a basement and furnace under the church, a drop ceiling in the nave along with wallpaper and paneling, and they replaced the clear glass windows with colored glass.

Some Norwegian language services continued into the 1950s. In 1966 the West Church joined the Wisconsin Synod and renamed itself Bethany Church.
