= Parkview School District =

School district in Wisconsin, United States

Coordinates: 42°37′51.6″N 89°15′21.7″W

Address
- 106 W Church St Orfordville, WI, Rock County; United States

District information
- Grades: 4K–12
- Superintendent: Dr. Wayne Anderson (Interim)
- School board: President, Zach Knutson; V.P, Jennie Krajeck; Clerk, Chuck Hagmann; Treasurer, Tina Suiter-Meyers; Dianne Myhre; Amanda Vogt; Michelle Schwarz; John Thomson
- Schools: 4
- NCES District ID: 5511130

Students and staff
- Students: 837 (2024–25)
- Teachers: 58.92 (on an FTE basis)
- Student–teacher ratio: 14.21
- Athletic conference: Trailways Conference

Other information
- Website: www.parkview.k12.wi.us

Parkview School District is a school district serving areas of Rock County, Wisconsin. The district includes the villages of Orfordville and Footville, as well as the towns of Spring Valley, Plymouth, Magnolia and Newark.

== Schools ==
- Parkview Primary School
- Parkview Elementary School
- Parkview High School
- Parkview Jr. High School
