= James B. Crosby House =

- U.S. National Register of Historic Places
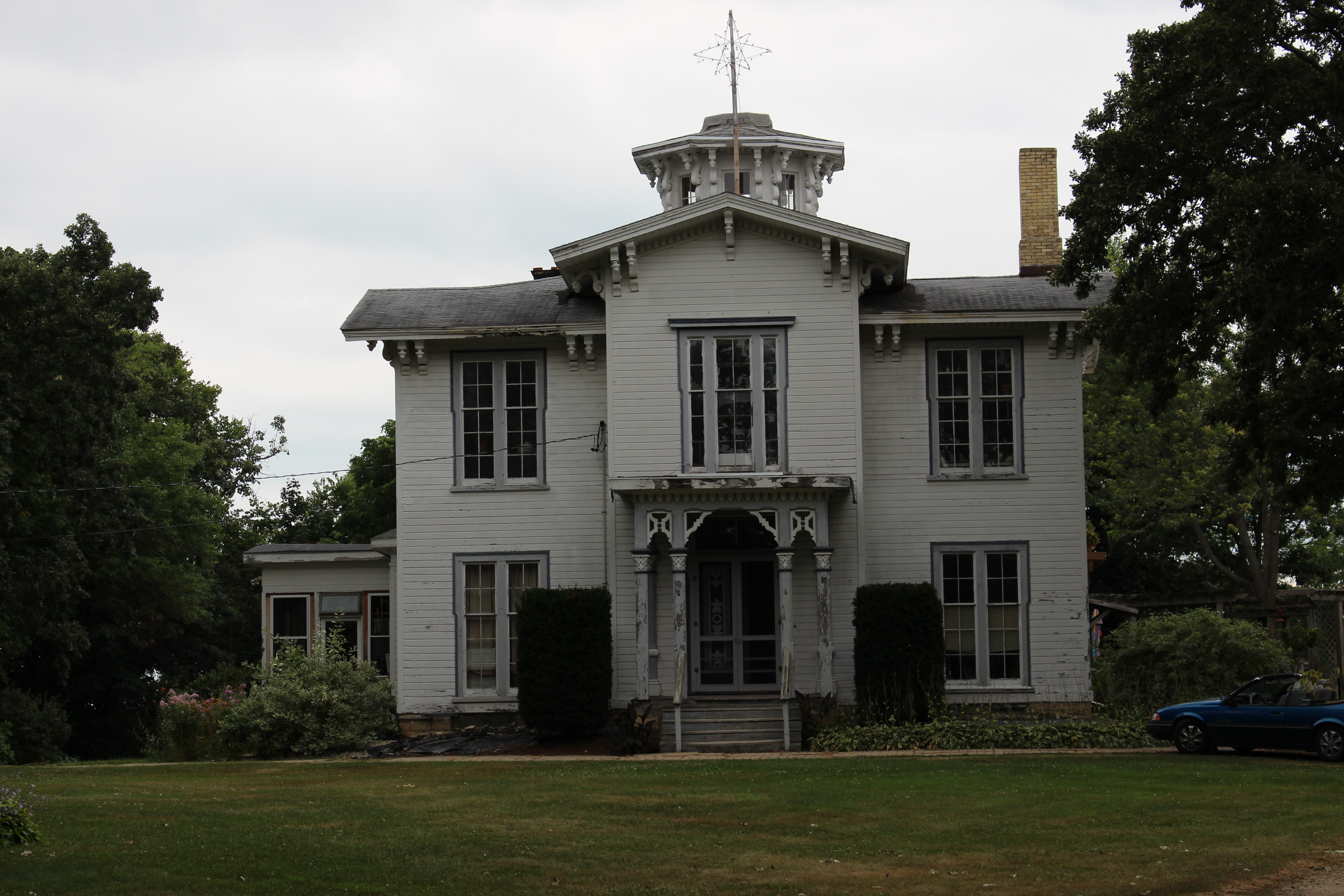
- The James B. Crosby House in 2015

- Location within Wisconsin
- Location: 1005 Sutherland Avenue, Janesville, Wisconsin
- Coordinates: 42°41′41″N 89°01′27″W
- Area: 4 acres (1.6 ha)
- Built: 1854
- Architectural style: Italianate
- NRHP reference No.: 95001454
- Added to NRHP: December 14, 1995

The James B. Crosby House is a historic house in Janesville, Wisconsin. It was built in the 1850s, and it became a hospital in the 1880s, only to be converted into apartments in the late 1930s. It is listed on the National Register of Historic Places.

== History ==
The house was built in the 1850s for James B. Crosby, who first worked as the cashier of the Rock County Bank and later as the manager of the Harris Manufacturer Company. Crosby sold the house to the Judd family in 1868, and they turned it into a private hospital, known as Oaklawn Hospital, in 1882. It remained in the Judd family until 1888, and it was owned by several families until 1907, when it was purchased by Father Lawrence Vaughan, a Roman Catholic priest who only lived here for a year. It was owned by several families from 1908 to 1938, when it was converted into separate apartments.

== Architectural significance ==
The house was designed in the Italianate architectural style. It has been listed on the National Register of Historic Places since December 14, 1995.
