= Kinney Farmstead (Tay-e-he-Dah) =

Historic Italianate/Greek Revival hotel and restaurant in Rock County, Wisconsin

- Kinney Farmstead (Tay-e-he-Dah) or The Lake House Inn
- U.S. National Register of Historic Places
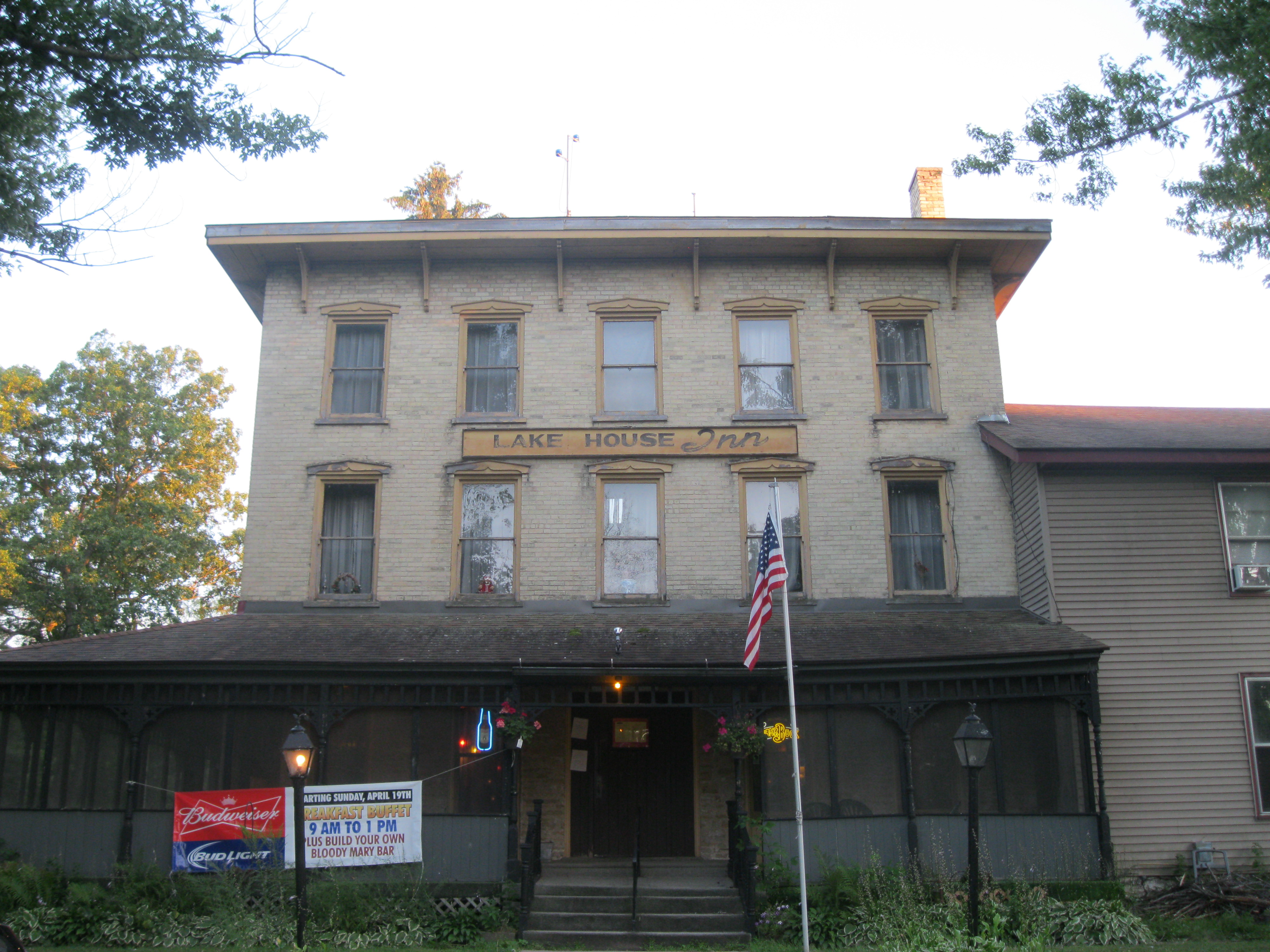
- The Kinney Farmstead, now a restaurant known as the Lake House Inn, in Edgerton, Wisconsin.

- Location within Wisconsin Location within the United States
- Location: 1612 E Hotel Dr, Edgerton, Wisconsin 53534
- Coordinates: 42°50′32″N 89°00′17″W
- Built: 1870
- Architectural style: Greek Revival architecture; Italianate architecture
- Website: https://www.lakehouseinnedgerton.com/
- NRHP reference No.: 78000134
- Added to NRHP: February 17, 1978

The Kinney Farmstead or Tay-e-he-Dah, also called The Lake House Inn is a historic Italianate and Greek Revival building located in the village of Newville near the city of Edgerton in Rock County, Wisconsin, United States, near the shore of Lake Koshkonong.

== History ==
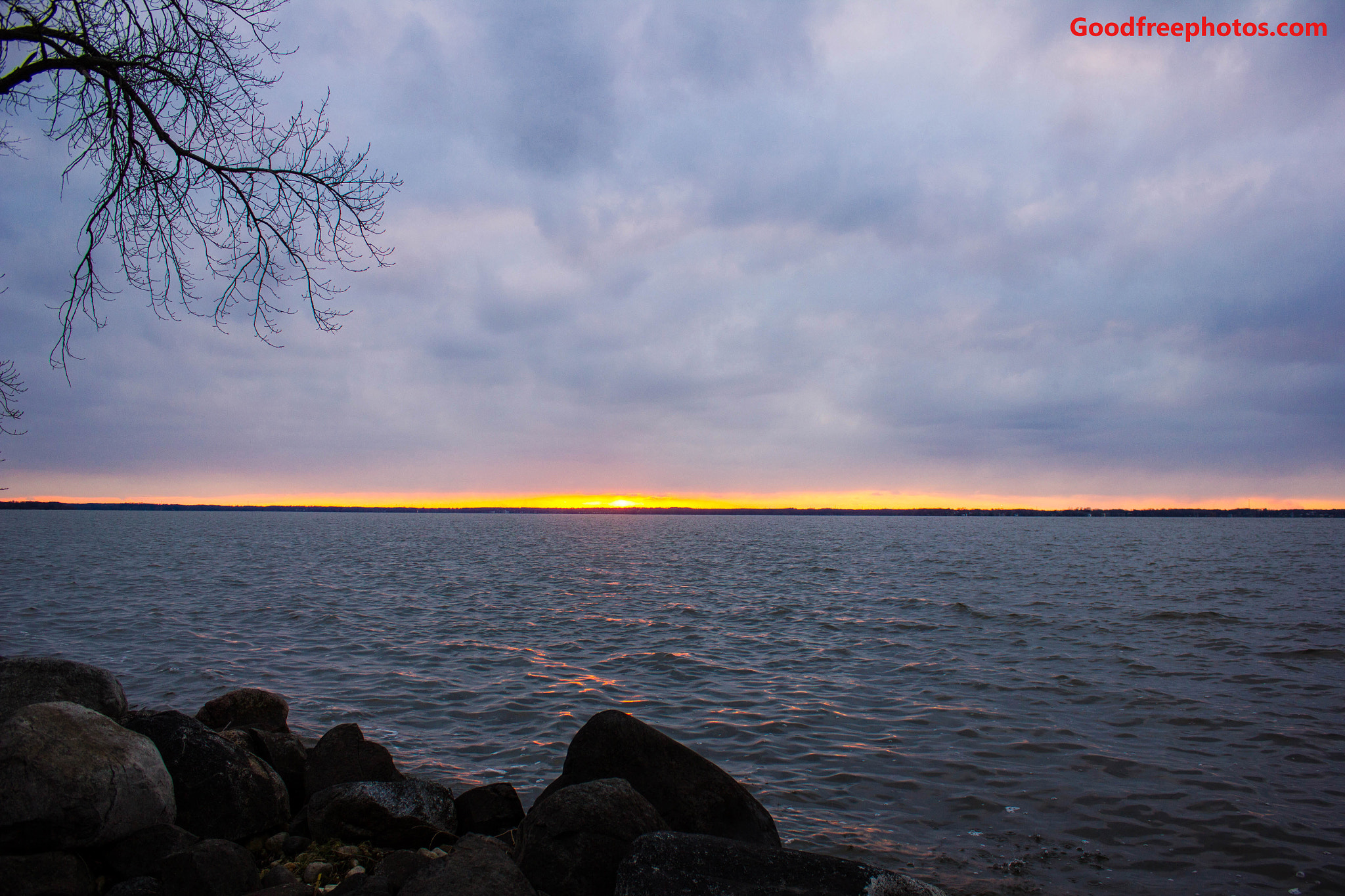
Sunset on Lake Koshkonong, Wisconsin.

=== Ho-Chunk village ===
The area which became the Kinney farmstead was originally inhabited by a subtribe of the Ho-Chunk called the Tay-e-he-dah, who lived on the western shore of Lake Koshkonong and named the small village Tay-e-he-dah. In 1834 during the beginning of the Black Hawk War the site had been abandoned by the Ho-Chunk as noted by government surveyors. On August 29, 1835, the land in the area was purchased by Isaac Bronson from New York. Rock County had not yet formally been formed, hence the land was under the land district of Milwaukee. The abandoned village features several burial mounds and was a favored area for hunting and fishing. Other Indigenous people that lived near the shores of the lake were the Potawatomi, Sauk, and Meskwaki.

=== The Kinney family ===
The Kinney family was the first non-Indigenous people to inhabit the area. On August 31, 1839, Azor Kinney (1803–1885) purchased the 119.55 acre property and built a home on the property in 1847. Kinney's property consisted of an apple orchard on the hill which overlooks Lake Koshkonong and provided for himself and his family via subsistence farming on the remaining property. Later in 1857 the main floor of what would later become a hotel was built as a storage shed for farm implements.

=== William Taylor and the first Hotel ===
Kinney eventually moved to Iowa and sold the property to William Taylor in 1870. Taylor quickly took over the property alongside Robert Carr and added a second floor to the main building and converted the property into a hotel. The property was initially called the Taylor House until 1874 when Taylor changed the name to the Koshkonong Hotel. The area around the hotel became nicknamed "Taylor's Point" as it was one of the highest elevations along the lake.

=== Courtland Bliven ===
William Taylor sold 60 acres of the property along with the hotel in 1899 to Courtland Bliven of New York for $6,500. Courtland Bliven and his brother, Peak Bliven of Tomah, Wisconsin, would run the hotel from 1899 until 1922. During his time as the hotels proprietor Courtland undertook a large remodeling project which greatly improved the hotel and purchased a further 300 acres of land from the surrounding properties. Bliven's new additions to the building included a new roof, replastering, and a natural gas line which provided the hotel with both hot and cold water.

=== Schmeling family ===
In 1922 Heinrich "Henry" Carl Schmeling of Edgerton purchased the hotel and land from the Bliven brothers. Henry Schmeling immediately leased the property to Ollie "O.J." Shaul of Rockford, Illinois who ran it as a restaurant and hotel. Schmeling later platted 65 lots on the property to be placed for sale as summer cottages to rent and sell. The area that Schmeling sold to private developers was eventually developed into the Maple Beach subdivision of Newville. In 1931 Schmeling and his family moved into the farmhouse on the property. The Schmeling family eventually moved into the hotel in 1934 and used the upstairs rooms as their private residence. Meanwhile, the lower dining room was utilized as a tavern by Henry's son Carl, Carl named the tavern the Maple Beach Inn and ran the tavern for the remainder of the families ownership if the building. Henry C. Schmeling died on May 28, 1951, and willed the property to his family until it was sold in 1960.

=== The Lake House Inn ===
Wayne Hemmingway purchased the tavern and inn from the Schmeling family in 1960 for $48,000 (roughly $523,000 in 2024). Under Hemmingway's ownership he partnered with Robert W. Axcell and changed the name to The Lake House Inn. The Lake House Inn was added to the National Register of Historic Places on February 17, 1978, for its historical relationship with the area of Rock County, Wisconsin and its close association with the Ho-Chunk people who historically lived in the area of Lake Koshkonong. The building itself is listed as a unique example of 19th-century Greek Revival architecture and Italianate architecture within Rock County.

The Axcell family owned and operated the Lake House Inn until 2016 when it was sold to LVW Properties. The property was eventually sold to Lori McGowan in 2022 following the COVID-19 pandemic who developed the property once again into a Supper Club. McGowan's additions include converting the Kinney farmhouse from a party room into a boutique and tasting room space. The supper club within the inn is currently owned and operated by Kerry Enger.

== 2026 Fire ==
On January 4, 2026, a fire broke out at the Lake House Inn. According to WKOW, WITI, and WMTV the fire was reported around 8:28pm and extinguished by 11:30pm. The fire devastated much of the historic structure of the Lake House Inn, the fire is considered a "total loss". The supper club was closed at the time of the fire, fire currently remains under investigation.

== See also ==
- National Register of Historic Places listings in Rock County, Wisconsin.
