= Parkview High School (Orfordville, Wisconsin) =

Parkview Junior/Senior High School

Location
- 403 West Beloit Street; Orfordville, Wisconsin 53576; United States; 42°37′52″N 89°15′23″W

Information
- School type: Public school (government funded), High school
- Established: 1 September 2015
- School district: Parkview School District
- NCES District ID: 5511130
- CEEB code: 501720
- NCES School ID: 551113001476
- Principal: T. Sloan Allen
- Teaching staff: 16.01 (on an FTE basis)
- Grades: 6-12
- Gender: Coeducational
- Enrollment: 187 (2024-2025)
- Student to teacher ratio: 11.68
- Campus: Rural: Distant
- Colors: Royal blue and white
- Nickname: Vikings
- Newspaper: The Parkview Voice
- Yearbook: The Viking
- Website: www.parkview.k12.wi.us

Parkview Junior/Senior High School is a public secondary school located in the village of Orfordville, Wisconsin, United States. It is the only high school in the Parkview School District and has an enrollment of approximately 300.

== History ==
The former building, designed by Charles Pym, was constructed in 1964. It is now the elementary school. The junior high was added in 1970, after the original building was constructed. In April 2014, voters passed a referendum to spend $17 million to build a new high school and junior high on the site of the former Parkview Elementary, with the elementary students to occupy the former high school and junior high.

== Extracurricular activities ==
Varsity sports at Parkview include football, cross country, volleyball, wrestling, basketball, poms, cheer leading, show choir, track and field, baseball, softball, and golf. The school competes within the Trailways conference.

=== Athletic conference affiliation history ===
- State Line League (1933-1970)
- Central Suburban Conference (1970-1977)
- Rock Valley Conference (1977-2017)
- Trailways Conference (2017–present)

== Notable alumni ==
- Robert Brooks has been a Wisconsin state representative since 2015.
