= Gempeler Round Barn =

- U.S. National Register of Historic Places
- Location within Wisconsin Location within the United States
- Nearest city: Orfordville, Wisconsin
- Coordinates: 42°39′50″N 89°19′50″W
- Area: less than one acre
- Built: 1912
- Built by: Hasse Brothers
- MPS: Centric Barns in Rock County TR
- NRHP reference No.: 79000110
- Added to NRHP: June 4, 1979

The Gempeler Round Barn near Orfordville, Wisconsin, United States, is a round barn built about 1912, unusual in that its central support is the trunk of an oak tree, three feet across at the top. The barn was listed on the National Register of Historic Places (NRHP) in 1979.

In 1902 Chris Gempeler bought this farm in the rolling country of western Rock County. After farming for some years, he hired the Hasse brothers of Durand, Illinois to build him a round barn, which they did in the summer and fall of 1912.

The barn is a round basement barn, 68 feet in diameter. In the center of the bottom level, on a base of concrete blocks, stands the trunk of an old oak tree which rises 9 feet to support the mow floor. This trunk is upside down, 2.5 feet across at the bottom and 3 feet across at the top, providing a larger surface for attaching the 3x10 joists that radiate out and support the mow floor. The outside wall has a limestone foundation almost two feet thick. Above, the barn is clad in horizontal wood siding bent to the curve of the barn. The floor of the basement was originally dirt. The second floor is a hay mow, accessed through sliding doors on the north side. 18-foot studs rise to support a conical roof with rafters leading up to a collar beneath the central cupola on top of the roof. The original roof was clad in wood shingles; they have since been covered with asphalt.

Gempeler raised Guernseys at first. Young stock roamed free in the round pen in the center of the basement. Along the outside wall were 28 cow stalls and 11 horse stalls facing in. Between the inner circle and the outer ring ran an aisle from which Gempeler could feed his animals. Many round barns were built around a central silo, but this one was not; instead he added a silo outside the barn to the southeast about 1920. Chris Gempeler retired and his son Chester took over farming. They wired the barn around 1930, and added bracing to the roof about 1938. About 1967 Chester sold the farm.

Few round barns remain, and the NRHP registration considers this one "significant for its ingenious construction, with its main story supported by an inverse pylon made up of an oak trunk upside down in the center of the basement." The barn was demolished in 1990.

== See also ==
- Risum Round Barn, nearby, also NRHP-listed
