= St. John's Lutheran Church (Evansville, Wisconsin) =

Historic church in Wisconsin, United States

- U.S. National Register of Historic Places
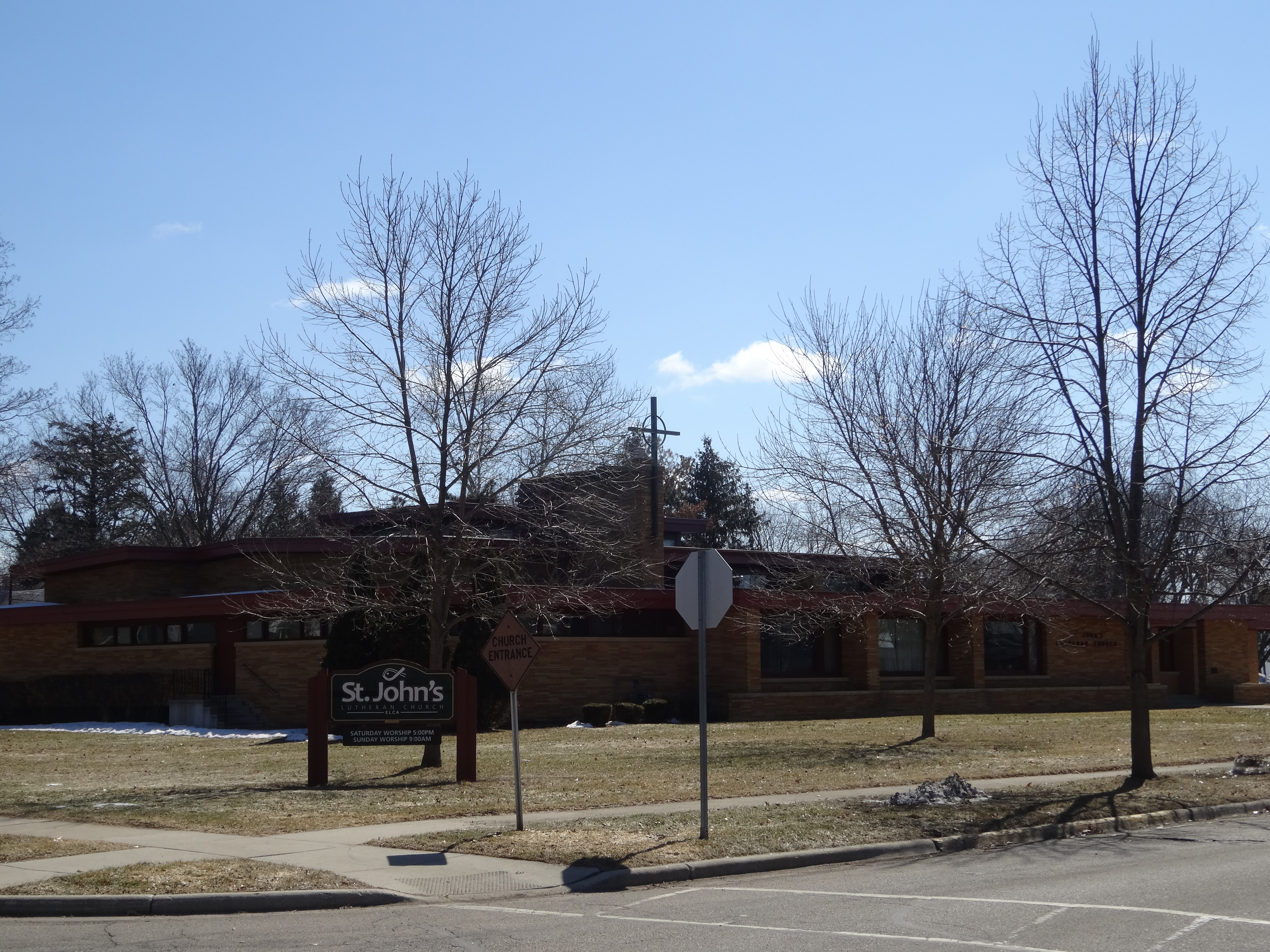
- St. John's Lutheran Church

- Location within Wisconsin Location within the United States
- Location: 312 3rd St. Evansville, Wisconsin
- Coordinates: 42.7760°N 89.3059°W
- Built: 1957
- Architect: John Steinmann/Robert Torkelson
- NRHP reference No.: 14000084
- Added to NRHP: August 14, 2012

The St. John's Lutheran Church is a congregation of the Evangelical Lutheran Church in America located in Evansville, Wisconsin. It was originally founded in June 1936 under the name First Lutheran, but took the name St. John's in 1938 after they purchased the old St. John's Episcopal Church, which featured that name over the door.

By April 1951, the congregation was outgrowing the First Street church and plans were laid for a new building. The present site was purchased in 1956 and ground was broken in 1957, with the first service held in the new church on June 15, 1958.

== Architecture ==
Noted architect John Steinmann designed much of the 1957 church, drawing inspiration from Frank Lloyd Wright. It was added to the State Register of Historic Places in 2011 and to the National Register of Historic Places the following year.
