= Risum Round Barn =

- U.S. National Register of Historic Places
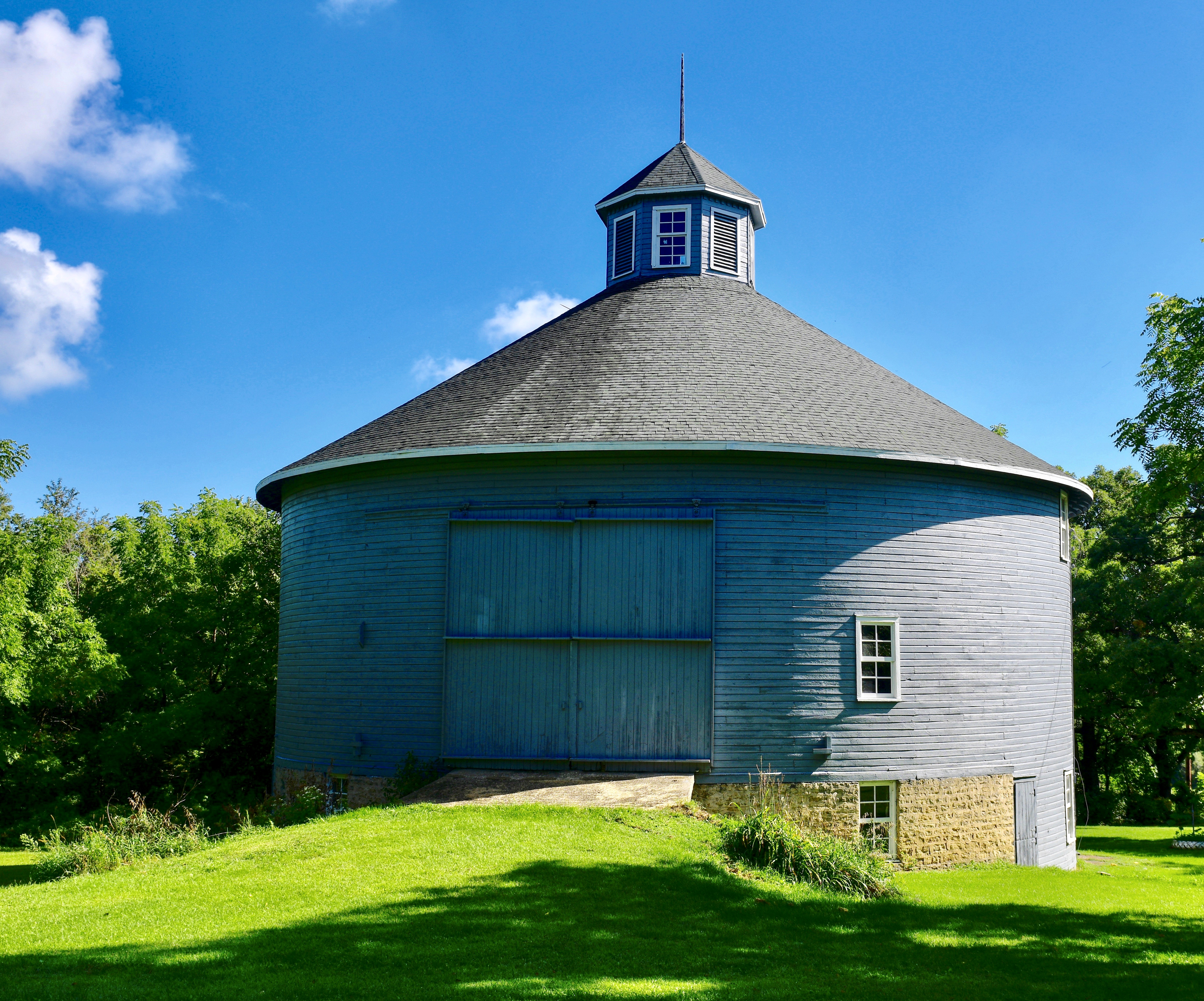

- Location within Wisconsin Location within the United States
- Nearest city: Orfordville, Wisconsin
- Coordinates: 42°35′55″N 89°17′35″W
- Area: less than one acre
- Built: 1890-1892
- MPS: Centric Barns in Rock County TR
- NRHP reference No.: 79000112
- Added to NRHP: June 4, 1979

The Risum Round Barn near Orfordville, Wisconsin, United States, is a round barn that was built during 1890–1892. It was listed on the National Register of Historic Places (NRHP) in 1979.

The barn was designed to hold 30 cows and six horses at ground level, with the upper part a haymow. A wooden silo stands in the center of the structure. Windows under the eaves admit light and could allow air to flow in, over the hay and out the cupola.

Among round barns in Wisconsin, it is significant for its early date of construction. It is a 60-foot (18 m) diameter barn that was built for Carl Risum (1847–1899), an immigrant from Norway, built by a "carpenter named John Gansert or Gansell, according to oral tradition, but there is no record of the exact date or cost." Lumber to build the barn was brought from the railroad depot at Brodhead, Wisconsin, six miles away.

== See also ==
- Gempeler Round Barn, nearby, also NRHP-listed
