= Old Fourth Ward Historic District =

Historic district in Wisconsin, United States

- U.S. National Register of Historic Places
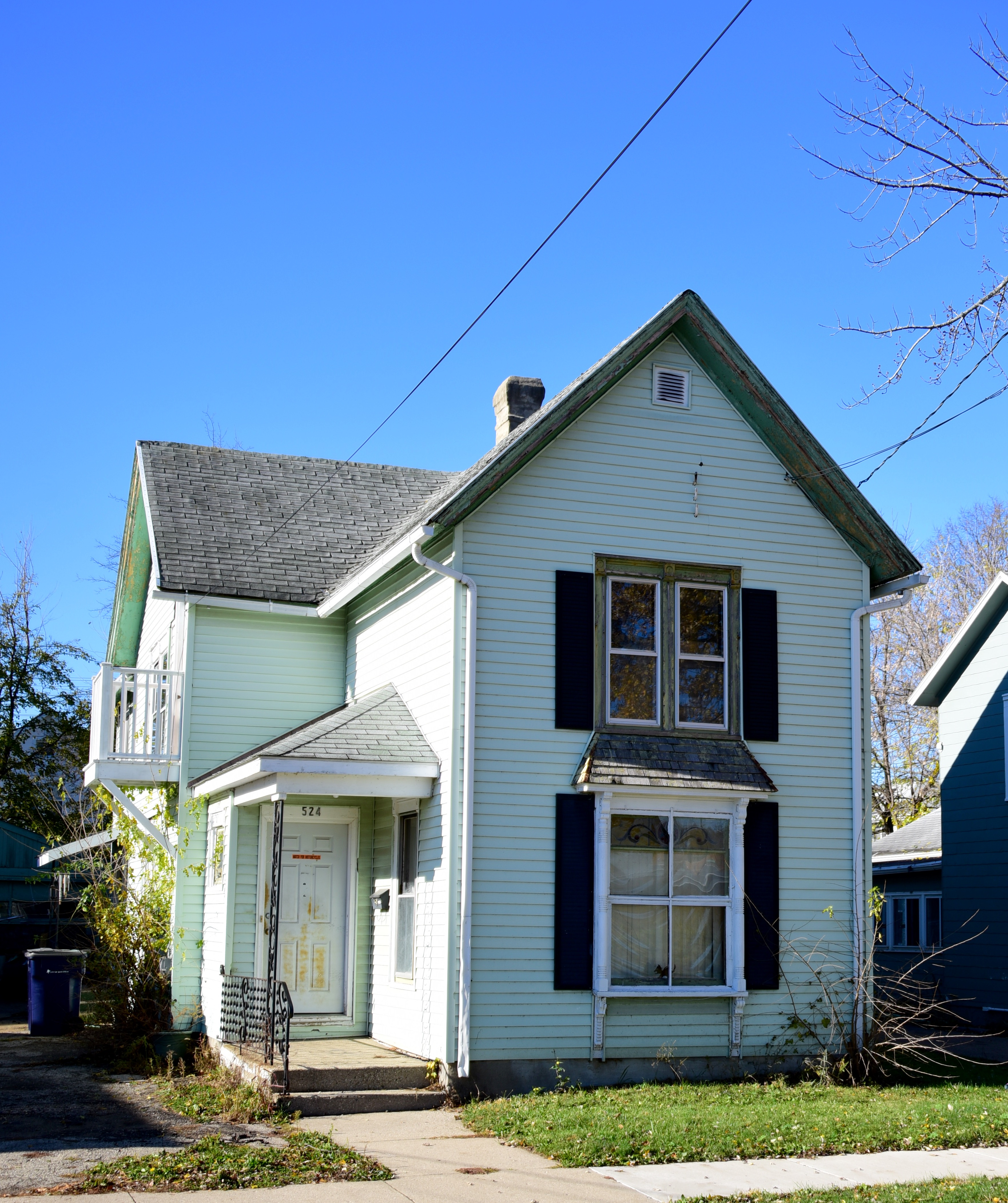
- Location: Roughly bounded by Washington St., Center Ave., Court St., Franklin St., and Monterey Park in Janesville, Wisconsin
- Coordinates: 42.67524°N 89.0257°W
- Area: 230 acres (93 ha)
- NRHP reference No.: 90000789
- Added to NRHP: May 30, 1990

The Old Fourth Ward Historic District in Janesville, Wisconsin is a large old working-class neighborhood southwest of the downtown, comprising about 1100 contributing structures built from the 1840s to 1930. In 1990 the district was listed on the National Register of Historic Places.

== Establishment ==
White settlers arrived in the Janesville area in 1835, staking claims on the south side of the Rock River, across from the Big Rock. That same year, Judge William Holmes platted the village of Rockport within what is now this district. Henry Janes platted a competing early village on the east side of the river, which eventually outgrew and subsumed Rockport, but some old names survive.

== Industrial development ==
Early entrepreneurs built dams on the Rock River to power sawmills, grain mills, a woolen mill, and a stone-sawing mill. James Harris started manufacturing farm equipment in 1859. Mill-owners and workers built their homes nearby. Around the Civil War prominent businessmen built stylish homes on the north end of the district, close to their businesses downtown. Harris's factory evolved into the larger Janesville Machine, and that later led to the GM assembly plant. From 1860 to 1890 workers at those factories filled most of the district with less fashion-conscious, more modest homes. The district was filled by 1930.

== Remarkable buildings ==
Here are some examples of types of buildings in the district, listed roughly in the chronological order built, by centuries. Their styles generally follow the same progression and periods as in most other parts of southern Wisconsin.

=== 19th century ===
- The First Methodist Church at 315 McKinley St is a 1-story frame structure built around 1847 by Janesville's first Methodists. They worshiped in this building until 1855, when they built a new brick church at McKinley St. and S. Jackson. This building has since been converted into a home, but the original Greek Revival style is still apparent in the low-pitched roof, frieze boards, and cornice returns.
- The Roswell Hill blacksmith shop at 904 Rockport Rd was probably built around 1855. Though it is rough and utilitarian, the low pitch of the roof, the symmetry, and the plain sills of the windows are compatible with the Greek Revival style that was in vogue then. At some point the second floor housed a small broom factory.
- The David Jeffris house at 212-214 S Cherry St is a 2-story frame house built in 1862 in Italianate style. Elements of the style are the low-pitched hip roof, decorative brackets under the eaves, and decorative window moldings. Jeffris was a Kentuckian who started a lumber business in Janesville, constructed buildings, and was a founder of Janesville Machine Company and the Merchants & Mechanics Bank.
- St. Patrick's Catholic Church at 301 S Cherry St is a cream brick church built in 1864. The round-topped openings are the hallmark of Romanesque Revival style. The building also features a decorative brick pattern under its eaves, corner buttresses, a tall steeple, and a large rose window under the steeple.
- The Luther Clark house at 302 S Locust St is a 2-story frame Italianate-style home built in 1870, similar to the Jeffris house, but grander. Clark was a carpenter from New York who built many fine buildings in Janesville, including the Court Street Methodist Church.
- The James Harris house at 170 S Jackson St is a tall 2-story cream brick home with a mansard roof, built in 1870. That roof is the hallmark of Second Empire-style, and other than that the house resembles the Italianate homes of the same period. Harris was an inventor who in 1859 started a factory that made agricultural machinery and grew in to Harris Machine Company. Later he started a barbed wire factory in the district.
- The Hayner house at 221 Linn St is a modest 2-story house built in 1873. It is vernacular, meaning not designed by an architect. The general form is gabled-ell and it is a good representation of many such working-class houses in the district. Adam Hayner was a partner in a saddlery and harness business.
- Old St. Paul's Lutheran Church at 169 S Academy St is a cream brick church built in 1883 by German Lutherans. Its style is Gothic Revival, indicated by the lancet arches (pointed tops) on the openings and the general emphasis on the vertical. Gothic style is rationalized for churches as pointing to heaven. The steeple was added in 1893.
- The Buggs house at 339 S Locust St is a 2.5-story Queen Anne-style house designed by George F. Barber and built in 1890. Hallmarks of Queen Anne style in this house are the complex roof, the fish-scale shingles and bargeboards in the gable end, the various surface textures, and the bay windows. August Buggs was in the coal business, ending up owning his coal company.

=== 20th century ===
- The four workers' cottages at 210-218 Riverside were built of rusticated concrete blocks from 1905 to 1910.
- The First Church of Christ Scientist at 323 W Court St was built about 1910 in Neoclassical style, with the front pedimented portico with Ionic columns.
- The Hayes house at 177 S High St is a large brick house built in 1915, with wide eaves and horizontal lines that show the influence of Prairie Style. It has a porte cochere on one side.
- The Dalton house was built at 309 W Holmes St in 1919 in American Foursquare style. Typical features are the cubic shape, the hip roof, and the general four-large-rooms-per-floor layout inside.
- The bungalow at 376 Rockport Rd was built in 1920. Typical features of the style are the wide front porch and broad eaves supported by knee braces.
- St. Paul's Lutheran School at 164 S Academy St is a 2-story red brick structure built in 1927 in Collegiate Gothic style.
- The Women's Club Association Building at 108 S. Jackson St. is a red brick meeting hall designed by Law, Law & Potter and built in 1928. Its style is Colonial Revival, with a tall round portico supported by Corinthian columns, topped with a balustrade.
- The Wilson School at 465 Rockport Road is a large 2-story school built in 1929, with the pediments and pilasters of Neoclassical (Georgian Revival?) style.
