= Ole P. Gaarder =

American politician

Ole P. Gaarder (June 9, 1844 – September 8, 1927) was an American farmer, businessman, and politician.

Ole Peder Gaarder was born in Rock County, Wisconsin Territory. He was the son of Norwegian immigrants. Gaarder lived in Orfordville, Wisconsin and was a farmer. He was also president of the Farmers and Merchants Bank of Orfordville which was established in 1901 as well as of the Orfordville Telephone Company. Gaarder served as assessor and supervisor of the town. He also served on the Rock County Board of Supervisors and was a Republican. In 1891, Gaarder served in the Wisconsin State Assembly. He was married to Anne (Hansdtr) Gaarder (1846-1929), who was an immigrant from Norway. Gaarder died at his home in Orfordville, Wisconsin. He was buried at the Luther Valley Cemetery in Beloit, Wisconsin.
