= Orfordville station =

Orfordville
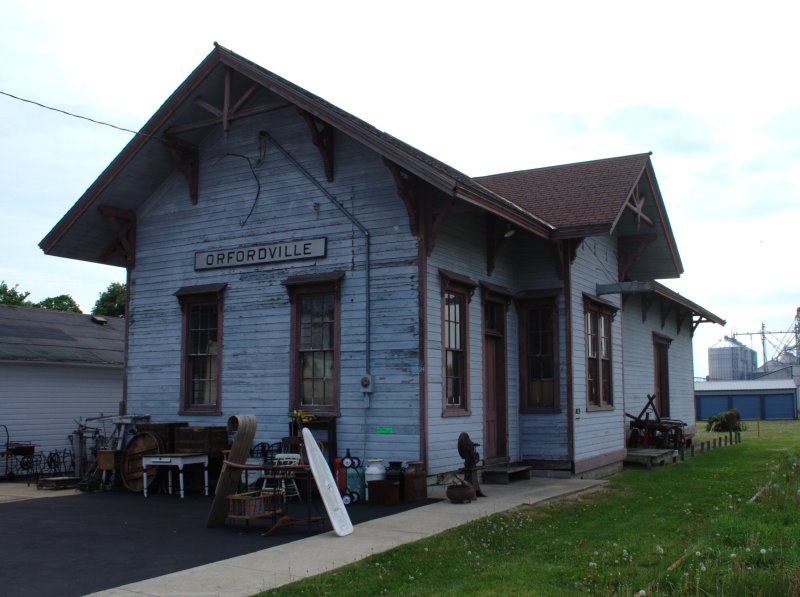
- Orfordville Depot in May 2008.

General information
- Location: 28 South Center Street, Orfordville, Wisconsin 53576
- System: Former Milwaukee Road passenger rail station

History
- Opened: 1886
- Closed: 1976

Services
Preceding station	Milwaukee Road	Following station
Brodhead toward Mineral Point	Mineral Point – Janesville	Hanover toward Janesville
- Orfordville Depot
- U.S. National Register of Historic Places
- Location within Wisconsin Location within the United States
- Location: Orfordville, Wisconsin
- Coordinates: 42.62799°N 89.25645°W
- Built: 1886
- Architectural style: Stick-Eastlake
- NRHP reference No.: 88002004
- Added to NRHP: October 13, 1988
Location

The Orfordville Depot was built in 1886 by the Milwaukee and Mississippi Railroad and served as a de facto social center for the tiny community of Orfordville, Wisconsin for decades. In 1988 it was added to the National Register of Historic Places.

The town of Orfordville is where it is because of the railroad. In 1855 J.T. Dodge platted the town when he learned that the Milwaukee and Mississippi Railroad planned to build its line through that spot. Orfordville's first depot was built in 1856 and the rail lines were laid through the budding town in 1857. In this era before good roads and cars, the railroad was the only convenient link to far-away places, markets, and mail, and a town's depot was important. Because of this transport link, the town around the depot grew while other crossroad communities withered.

The first depot served for almost 20 years, then was destroyed by a fire April 15, 1886. Two weeks later, the railroad began building the new depot, which still exists. It is one story, built of wood, with wide overhanging eaves supported by decorative brackets and decorative trusses in the gable ends. These trusses suggest Stick style architecture. The hoods over the windows suggest Italianate style. Inside the west end was a passenger waiting room. A ticket window led from there to the ticket office, from which a bay protrudes to let the station master easily look down the tracks both ways. On the other side of the office is a small baggage room and a larger freight room occupying half the depot.

Originally the depot sat 60 feet east of its present location, but it was moved in 1914 to extend Center Street. It was originally surrounded by a wooden platform, the roof ridge was topped by finials, and a canopy shaded the west side of the building, but those have been removed. Otherwise, the whole assembly is remarkably intact, right down to an old floor scale which may be original.

Over the years the Milwaukee and Mississippi Railroad was purchased by the Milwaukee and St Paul Railroad, to form the Chicago, Milwaukee, and St. Paul Railroad (Milwaukee Road). The depot served both freight and passengers until 1976. The right-of-way was purchased by the Wisconsin Department of Transportation after the Milwaukee Road entered bankruptcy. The line is currently leased to the Wisconsin and Southern Railroad.
