= Grove Street Historic District (Evansville, Wisconsin) =

- U.S. National Register of Historic Places
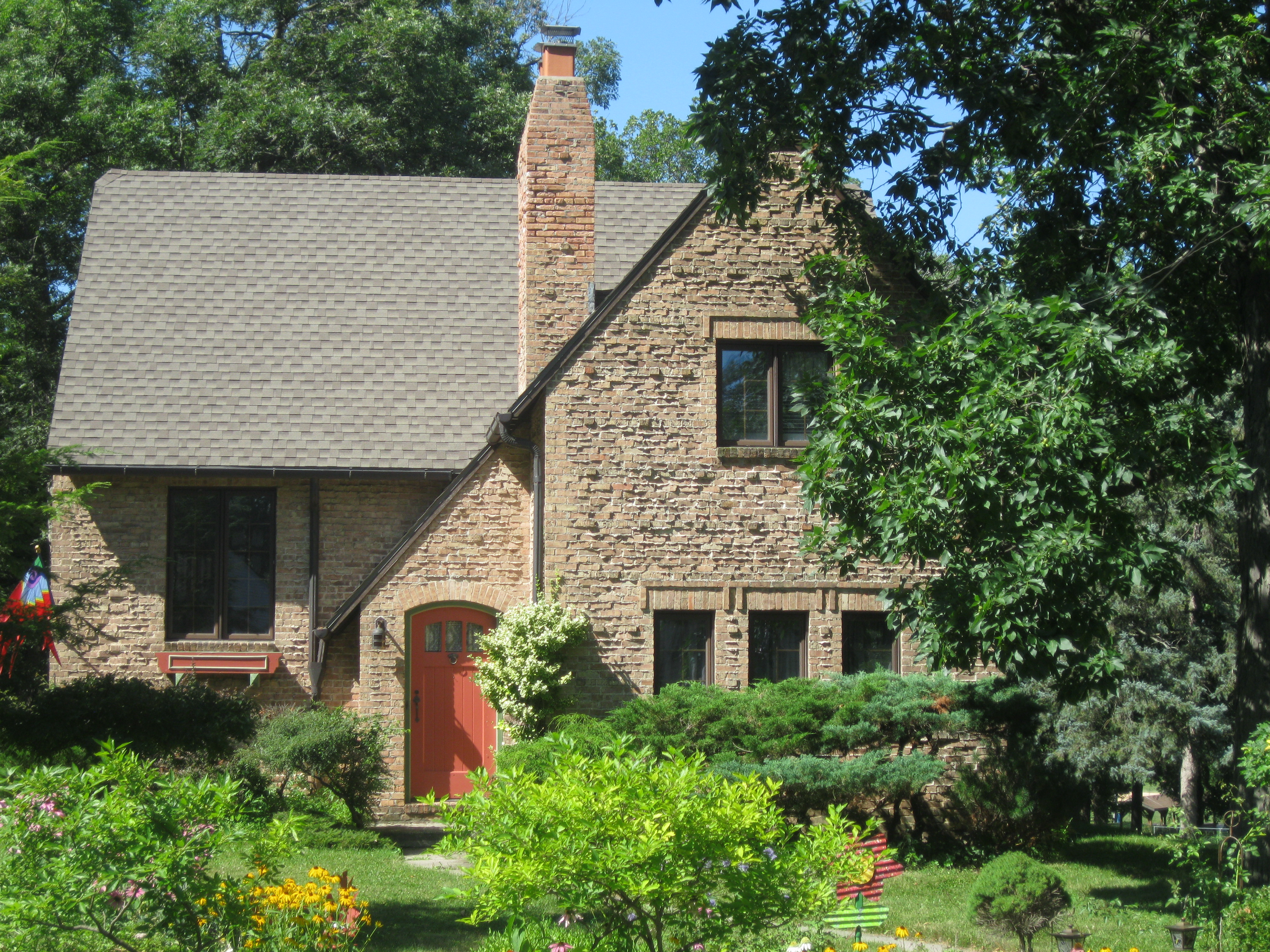
- 1925 Harley Smith house
- Location: 103, 111, 112, 116, 119, 125, 126, 133 & 134 Grove St., Evansville, Wisconsin
- Area: 4 acres (1.6 ha)
- NRHP reference No.: 11000531
- Added to NRHP: August 10, 2011

The Grove Street Historic District is a cluster of nine historic homes in various architectural styles built from 1910 to 1946 in Evansville, Wisconsin. It was added to the State Register of Historic Places in 2010 and to the National Register of Historic Places the following year.

Built in 1912, the Matt Ellis House at 125 Grove St. is the second oldest home in the district. Its architectural style is Queen Anne. That style emerged in the U.S. around 1880 and characteristic features are complex rooflines, corner towers, asymmetric wraparound porches, and careful attention to different surface textures. By 1912 most Queen Anne designs had become simpler, including the Ellis house with its moderately complex roofline, a front porch that is symmetric, and a large corner bay that suggests a tower.

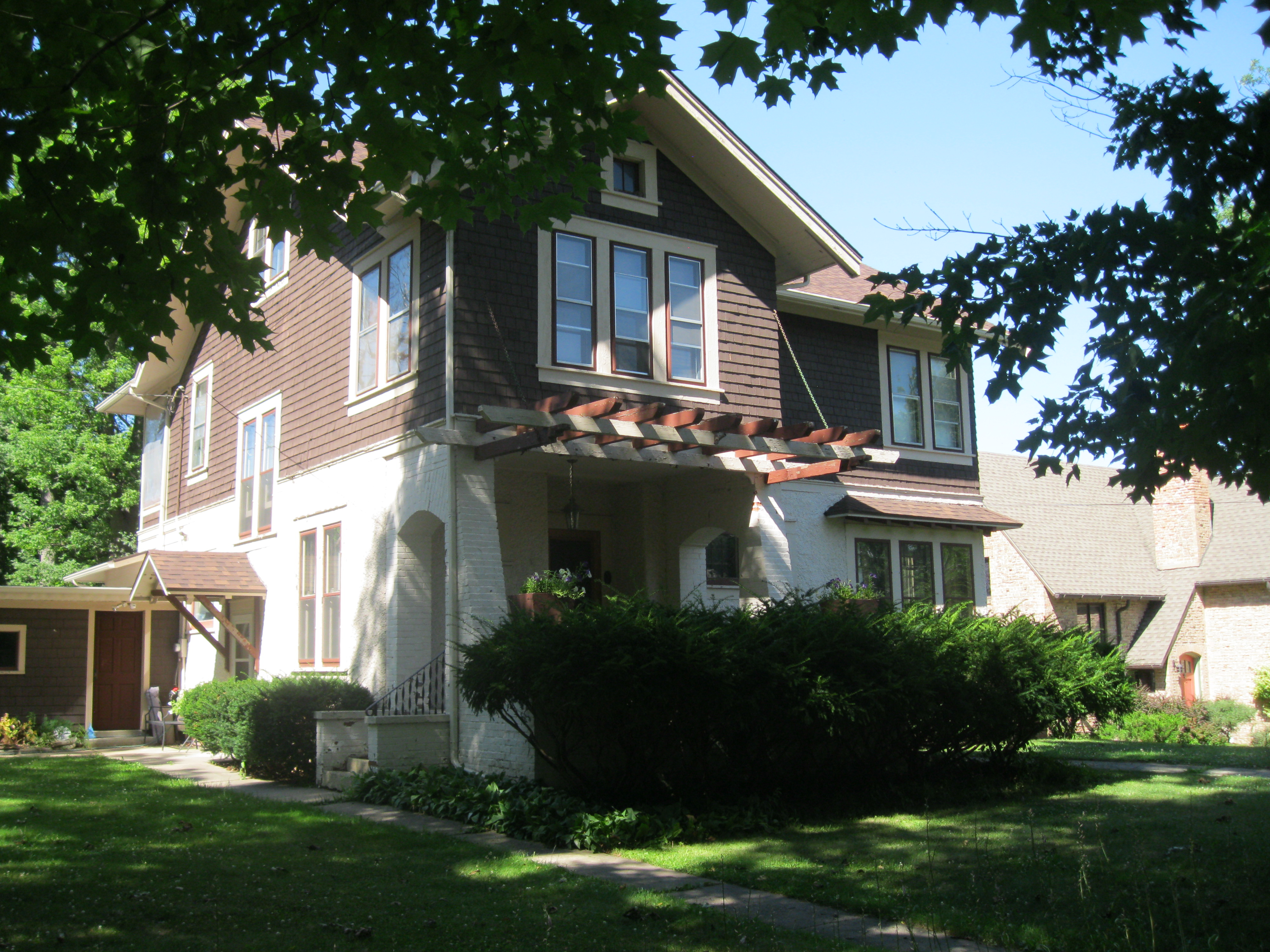
1910 Spencer House

The other earliest homes were built in Craftsman and Bungalow styles. These were considered modern styles at the time, practical and not drawing obviously from European models, as did the Gothic Revival, Italianate, and Queen Anne styles that preceded them. The grandest and earliest of these is the 1910 Louis Spencer house at 116 Grove, design by William Meggot and displaying many hallmarks of the Craftsman style, including broad eaves, some exposed rafter tails, and tapered columns. It also has a nice contrast between light stucco below and dark shingles above, and an interesting porch sheltered by a pergola. Louis Spencer was a farmer from south of Evansville who built this house and moved into town at retirement.

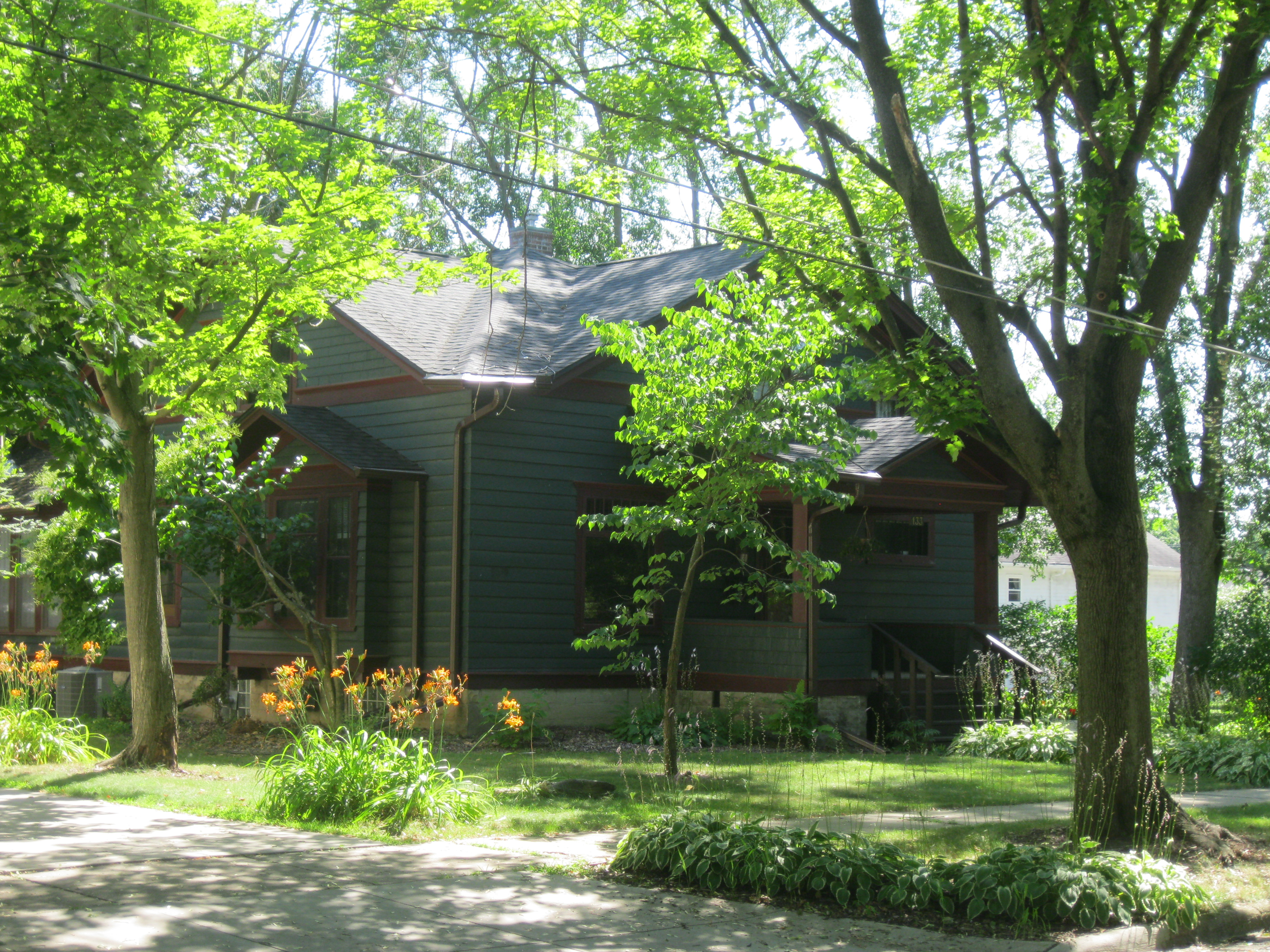
1912 Fruchen/Hansen bungalow at 133 Grove St.

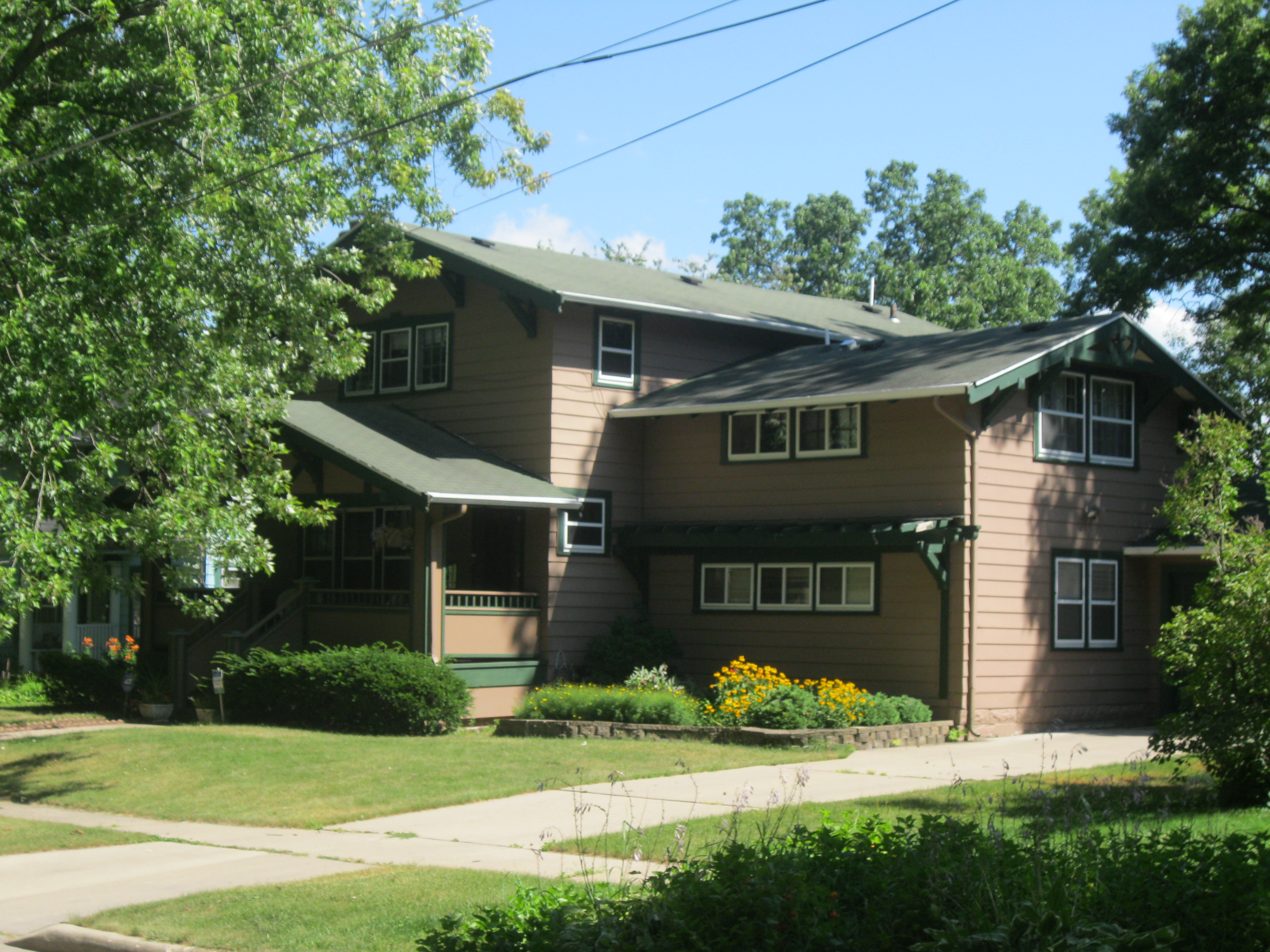
1919 Cram bungalow at 119 Grove St.

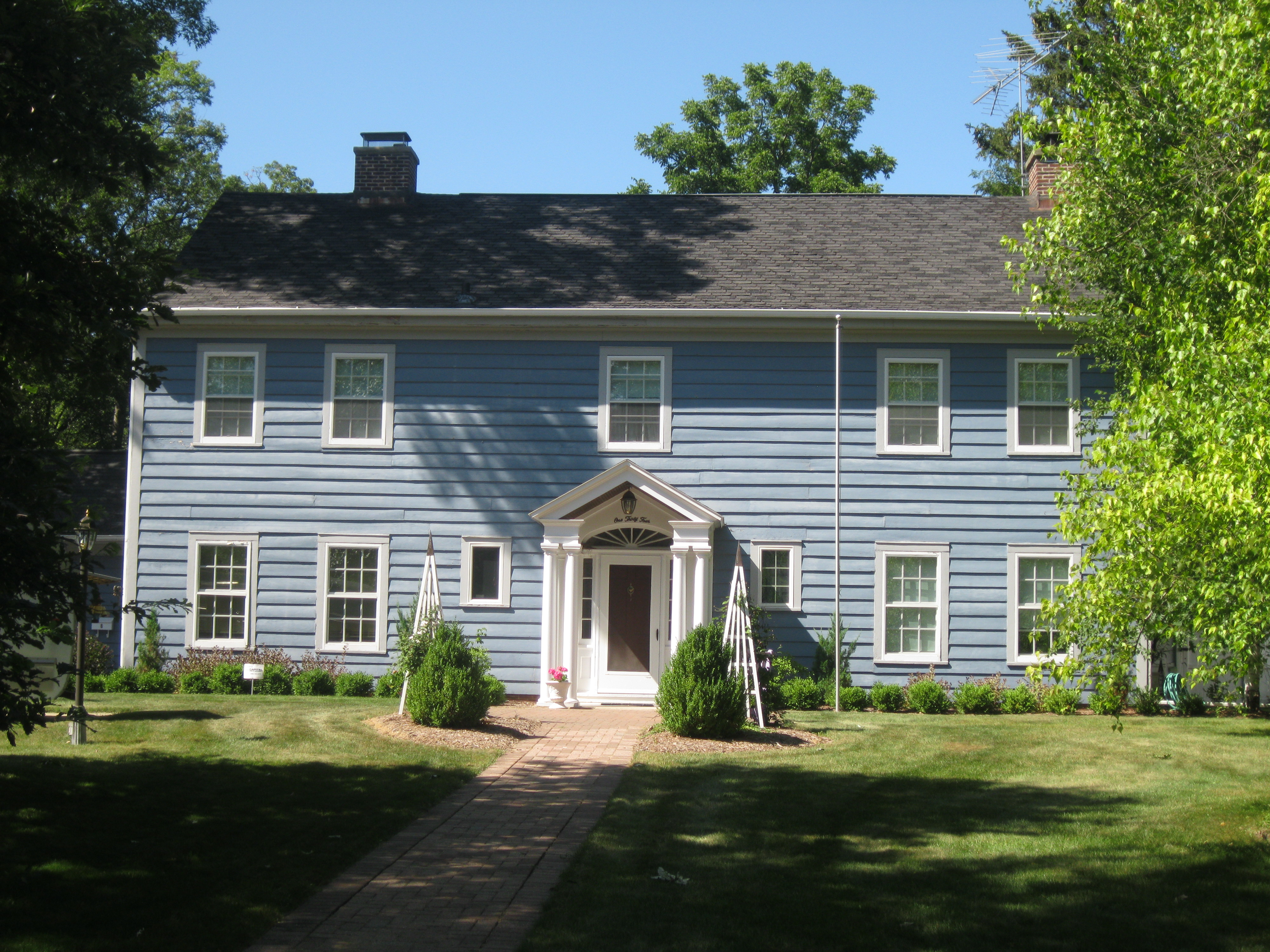
1922 Pullen house

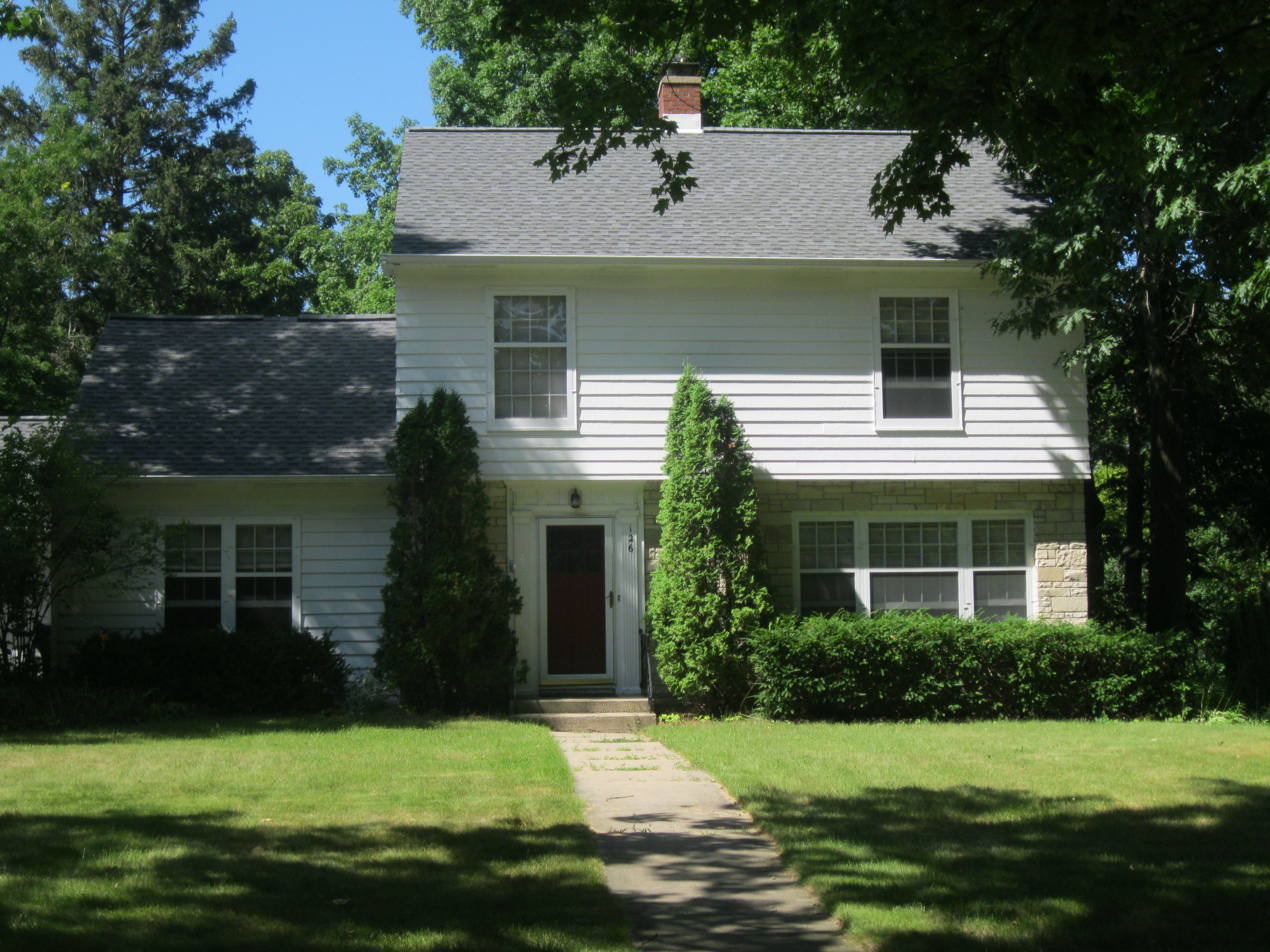
1941 Durner house

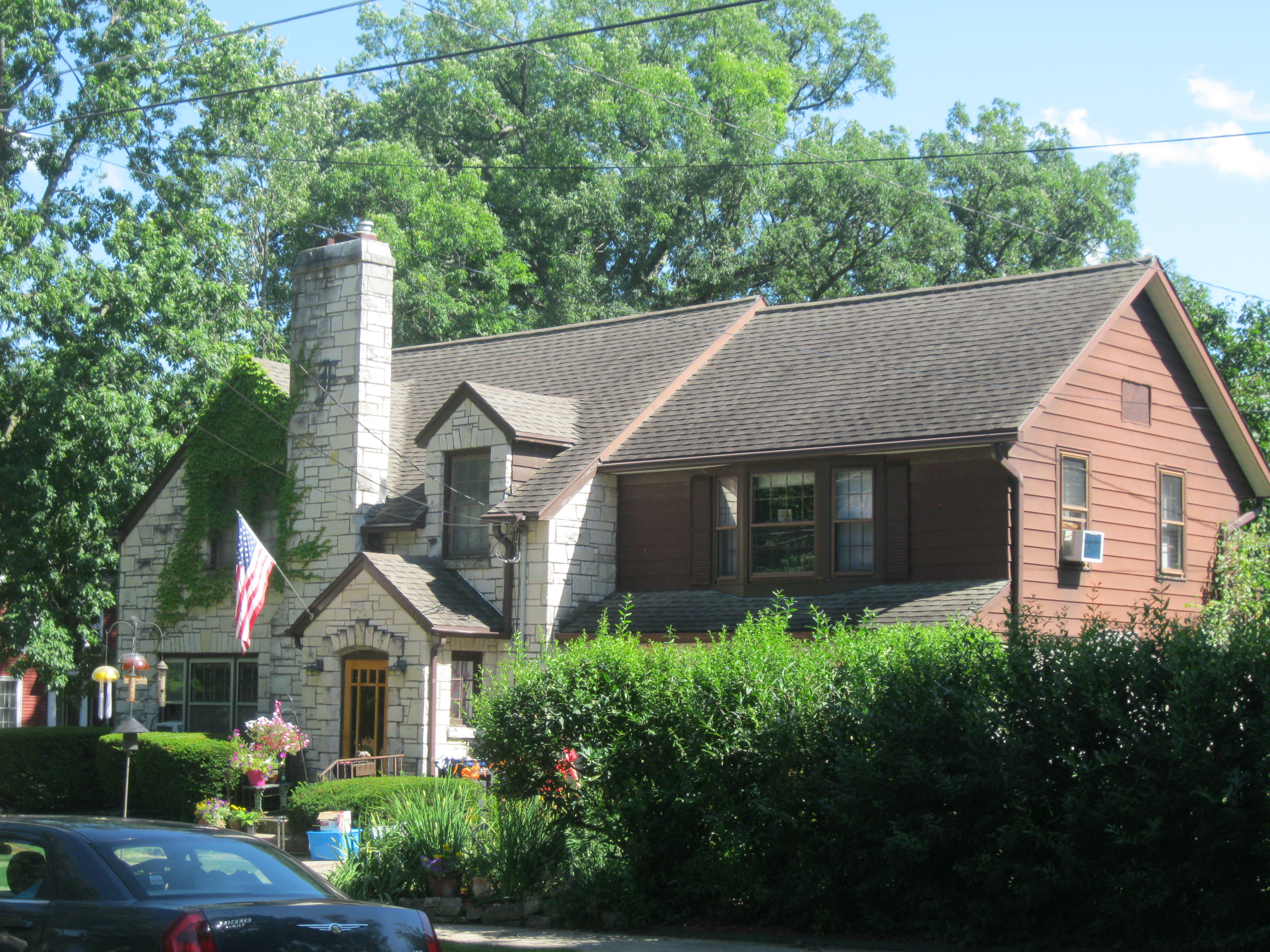
1946 Rasmussen house

Later houses were designed in the Period Revival styles, including the 1922 Colonial Revival Pullen house at 134 Grove St., the 1925 Tudor Revival Harley Smith house at 112 Grove, which was designed by Madison architect Grover H. Lippert, the 1941 Colonial Revival-styled Durner house at 126 Grove, and the 1946 Tudor Revival Rasmussen house at 103 Grove, with its stone-clad facade and large chimney characteristic of the style.
