= Orfordville, Wisconsin =

Village in Rock County, Wisconsin

- Village
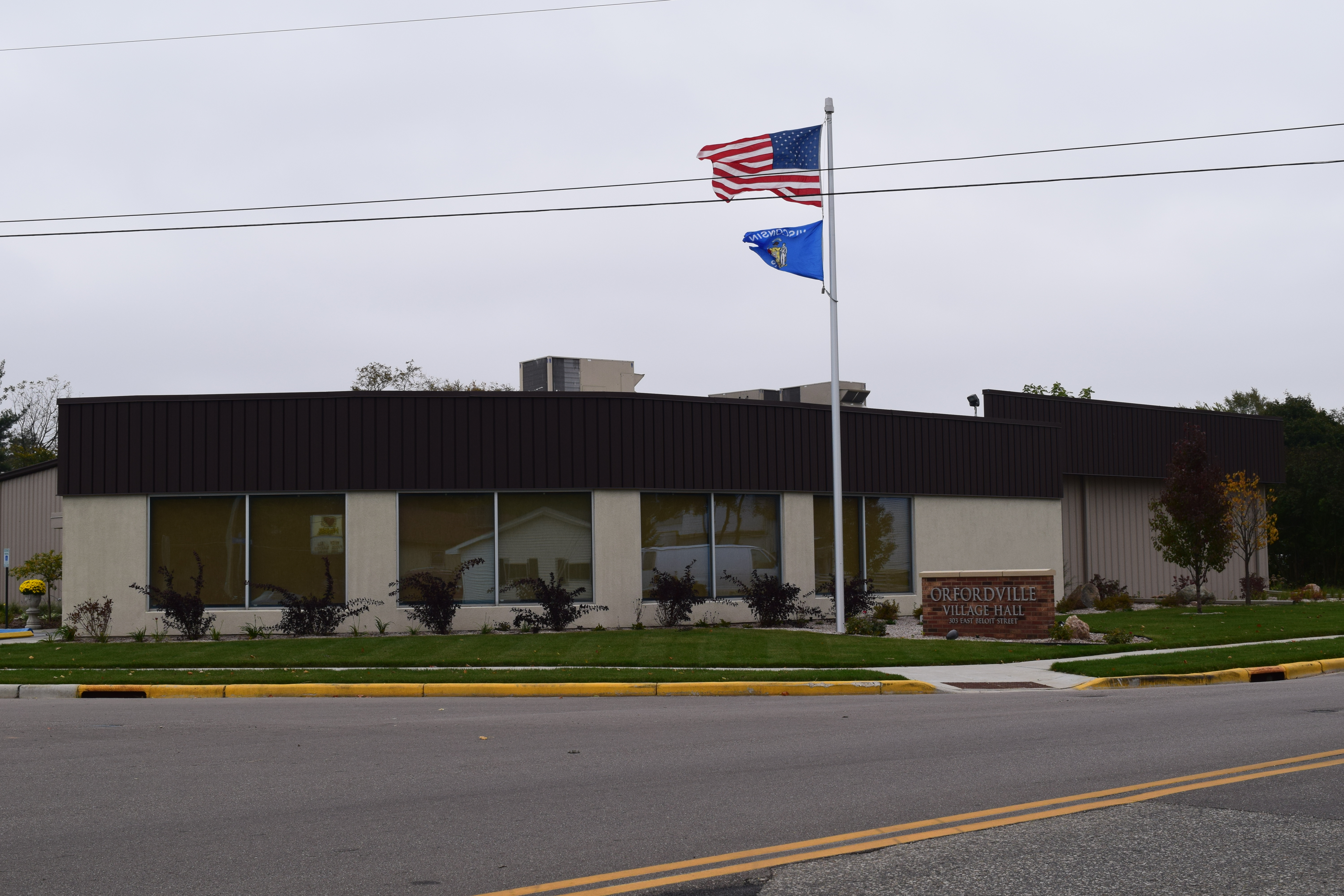
- Orfordville village hall

- Location of Orfordville in Rock County, Wisconsin.
- Coordinates: 42°37′45″N 89°15′24″W
- Country: United States
- State: Wisconsin
- County: Rock

Area
  - Total: 1.19 sq mi (3.07 km^{2})
  - Land: 1.19 sq mi (3.07 km^{2})
  - Water: 0 sq mi (0.00 km^{2})
- Elevation: 889 ft (271 m)

Population (2020)
  - Total: 1,473
  - Density: 1,262.4/sq mi (487.43/km^{2})
- Time zone: UTC-6 (Central (CST))
  - Summer (DST): UTC-5 (CDT)
- ZIP Code: 53576
- Area code: 608
- FIPS code: 55-60250
- GNIS feature ID: 1570857
- Website: https://orfordvillewi.gov/

Orfordville is a village in Rock County, Wisconsin, United States. It is located at the intersection of Highway 11, Highway 213, and the Wisconsin and Southern Railroad. The population was 1,473 at the 2020 census.

== History ==
The origin of its name came when a surveyor suggested Orford after a town in New Hampshire. It remained that until the establishment of a post office, when it was confused with Oxford, Wisconsin. The name was then changed to Orfordville at the suggestion of the postmaster general.

== Geography ==
Orfordville is located at 42°37′45″N 89°15′24″W (42.629300, −89.256755). The elevation is 889 feet (271 m).

According to the United States Census Bureau, the village has a total area of 1.17 square miles (3.03 km^{2}), all land.

== Demographics ==
Historical population
Census	Pop.	Note	%±
1880	153		—
1910	449		—
1920	496		10.5%
1930	502		1.2%
1940	510		1.6%
1950	543		6.5%
1960	665		22.5%
1970	888		33.5%
1980	1,143		28.7%
1990	1,219		6.6%
2000	1,272		4.3%
2010	1,442		13.4%
2020	1,473		2.1%
U.S. Decennial Census

=== 2010 census ===
As of the census of 2010, there were 1,442 people, 542 households, and 394 families living in the village. The population density was 1,232.5 inhabitants per square mile (475.9/km^{2}). There were 575 housing units at an average density of 491.5 per square mile (189.8/km^{2}). The racial makeup of the village was 96.1% White, 0.6% African American, 0.1% Native American, 0.3% Asian, 1.9% from other races, and 1.0% from two or more races. Hispanic or Latino of any race were 4.4% of the population.

There were 542 households, of which 41.0% had children under the age of 18 living with them, 55.2% were married couples living together, 10.5% had a female householder with no husband present, 7.0% had a male householder with no wife present, and 27.3% were non-families. 23.1% of all households were made up of individuals, and 10.3% had someone living alone who was 65 years of age or older. The average household size was 2.66 and the average family size was 3.11.

The median age in the village was 37.1 years. 29.3% of residents were under the age of 18; 6.7% were between the ages of 18 and 24; 27.5% were from 25 to 44; 25.3% were from 45 to 64, and 11.2% were 65 years of age or older. The gender makeup of the village was 47.3% male and 52.7% female.

=== 2000 census ===
As of the census of 2000, there were 1,272 people, 455 households, and 348 families living in the village. The population density was 1,093.5 people per square mile (422.2 people/km^{2}). There were 469 housing units at an average density of 403.2 per square mile (155.7/km^{2}). The racial makeup of the village was 97.41% White, 0.55% African American, 0.08% Native American, 0.94% from other races, and 1.02% from two or more races. Hispanic or Latino of any race were 2.28% of the population.

There were 455 households, out of which 41.5% had children under the age of 18 living with them, 59.6% were married couples living together, 11.9% had a female householder with no husband present, and 23.5% were non-families. 17.8% of all households were made up of individuals, and 6.8% had someone living alone who was 65 years of age or older. The average household size was 2.78 and the average family size was 3.14.

In the village, the population was spread out, with 31.0% under the age of 18, 7.8% from 18 to 24, 30.4% from 25 to 44, 20.2% from 45 to 64, and 10.6% who were 65 years of age or older. The median age was 33 years. For every 100 females, there were 94.5 males. For every 100 females age 18 and over, there were 93.0 males.

The median income for a household in the village was $46,875, and the median income for a family was $50,192. Males had a median income of $38,125 versus $25,050 for females. The per capita income for the village was $18,169. About 6.0% of families and 5.9% of the population were below the poverty line, including 7.2% of those under age 18 and 7.0% of those aged 65 or over.

== Education ==
Orfordville is the home of the Parkview School District's high school, Parkview High School. The village is also home to one of the school district's two grade schools, Parkview Elementary School. In 2015, a new high school was built and the high school was remodeled to become Parkview Elementary. After construction ended, all schools in the Parkview district were located in Orfordville.

== Transportation ==
Orfordville was previously served by intercity trains at the Orfordville Depot.

== Notable people ==
- Realf Ottesen Brandt, noted Lutheran minister
- Frederick Curtice Davis, Navy Cross recipient, the USS Frederick C. Davis (DE-136) was named after him.
- Olin J. Eggen, astronomer
- Ole P. Gaarder, Wisconsin State Representative
- Gilbert N. Haugen, U.S. Representative from Iowa
- Ole J. Kvale, U.S. Representative from Minnesota
- Paul John Kvale, U.S. Representative from Minnesota
