= MJW =

MJW may refer to:

- Malcolm-Jamal Warner (1970-2025), American actor
- Mary Jane Watson, a supporting character appearing in American comic books published by Marvel Comics
- Michael Jai White (born 1967), American actor, writer, director, producer, stunt coordinator and martial artist
- Melissa Jefferson-Wooden (born 2001), American track and field sprinter
- Mak Joon Wah (born 1942), Malaysian physician
- Matthew J. Walsh (1882–1963), American priest
- Max Joseph Wagenbauer (1775–1829), Bavarian artist
- Michael J. Waldvogel, American lacrosse player
- Michael J. Wallrich (1857–1941), Republican politician in the U.S. State of Wisconsin
- Michael J Walsh, American designer and creative director
- Martin Joseph Ward (born 1991), English professional boxer
- Michael J. Ward (born 1950/1951), American railroad executive
- Michael J. Warner (1843–1919), Democratic politician in the U.S. State of Wisconsin
- Mary Jane Warnes (1877–1959), Australian women's rights activists
- M J Warsi, Indian linguist, researcher, and author
- Martin J. Weber (1905–2007), American inventor
- Matt J. Wedel, American paleontologist
- Michael J. Weithorn (born 1956), American writer, director, and producer
- M J Whelan (born 1931), British scientist
- Michael J. Whitley (died 2000), American naval historian
- Marshall Jay Williams (1837–1902), Republican politician in the U.S. State of Ohio
- Maurice John Willis (1900–1975), Canadian educator and political figure
- Mary Jane Wilson (1840–1916), Englishwoman born in India who founded a religious order, the Franciscan Sisters of Our Lady of Victory
- Margaret J. Winkler (1895–1990), American film producer
- Martin J. Wygod (born 1940), American businessman and a prominent Thoroughbred racehorse owner/breeder
- Michael J. Wytrwal (1882–1970), American banker
- Mark J. Williams (born 1975), Welsh professional snooker player
