= Vivus Wright Dorwin =

19th century American politician

Vivus W. Dorwin
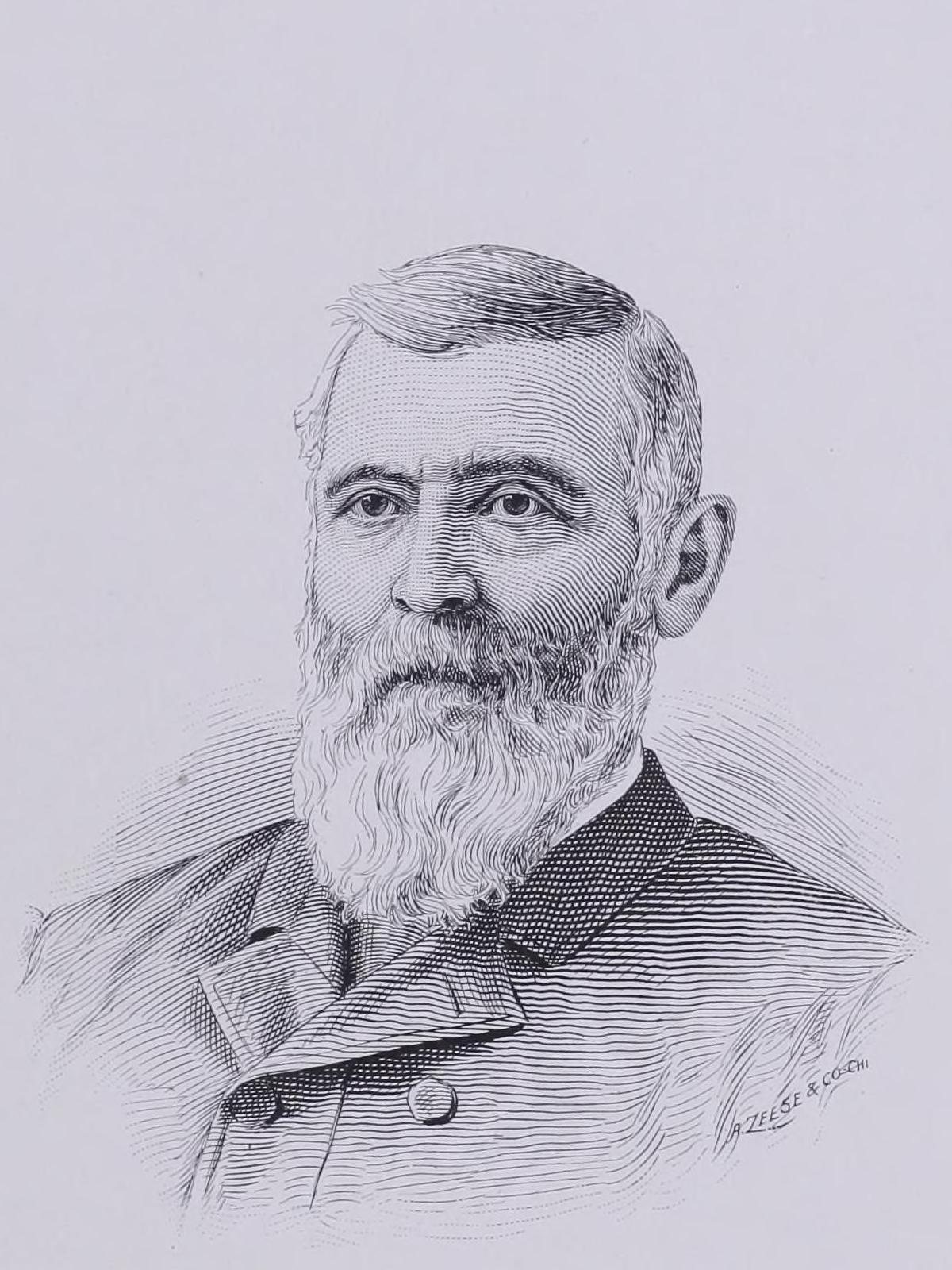
- Woodcarving by A. Zeese & Co.

Member of the Wisconsin State Assembly from the Pepin district
- In office January 7, 1889 – January 5, 1891
- Preceded by: John Newcomb
- Succeeded by: William Edmunds Plummer
- In office January 5, 1885 – January 3, 1887
- Preceded by: William H. Huntington
- Succeeded by: John Newcomb
- In office January 1, 1877 – January 6, 1879
- Preceded by: Menzus R. Bump (Dunn–Pepin)
- Succeeded by: James Barry

Personal details
- Born: January 15, 1832 Champion, New York, U.S.
- Died: September 27, 1904 (aged 72) Pepin County, Wisconsin, U.S.
- Resting place: Forest Hill Cemetery, Durand, Wisconsin
- Party: Republican
- Spouse: Helen Mariette Van Hoesen (died 1911)
- Children: Harriet M. (Brown)^{(b. 1859; died 1925)}; Marcellus Dorwin^{(b. 1861; died 1925)}; John Dorwin^{(b. 1863; died 1955)}; Ella Cora (Jones)^{(b. 1873; died 1958)}; Mary E. Dorwin^{(b. 1875; died 1906)}; William V. Dorwin; Helen I. (Odell); Lillian (Averill); Edward S. Dorwin; Laura Dorwin; Boscoe L. Dorwin

Military service
- Allegiance: United States
- Branch/service: United States Volunteers; Union Army
- Years of service: 1862–1863
- Rank: Captain, USV
- Unit: 25th Reg. Wis. Vol. Infantry
- Battles/wars: American Civil War

Vivus Wright Dorwin (January 15, 1832 – September 27, 1904) was an American farmer, businessman, Republican politician, and Wisconsin pioneer. He served four terms in the Wisconsin State Assembly, representing Pepin County.

== Biography ==
Dorwin was born on January 15, 1832, in Champion, New York. He later lived in Jackson, Adams County, Wisconsin, for a time before settling in Durand, Wisconsin, in 1856. In Durand, Dorwin owned a gristmill, wool carding mill, dairy farm and two cheese factories. During the American Civil War, he was a captain with the 25th Wisconsin Infantry Regiment of the Union Army. Events he took part in include the Siege of Vicksburg.

Dorwin and his wife, Helen, would have eleven children. Among them was Marcellus Dorwin, who also became a member of the Assembly. The elder Dorwin died on September 27, 1904.

== Political career ==
Dorwin was elected to the Assembly in 1876, 1877, 1884 and 1888. Other positions he held include Chairman of the Town Board of Supervisors of Durand. He was a Republican.
