= George Clay Ginty =

American politician and journalist (1840–1890)

George C. Ginty
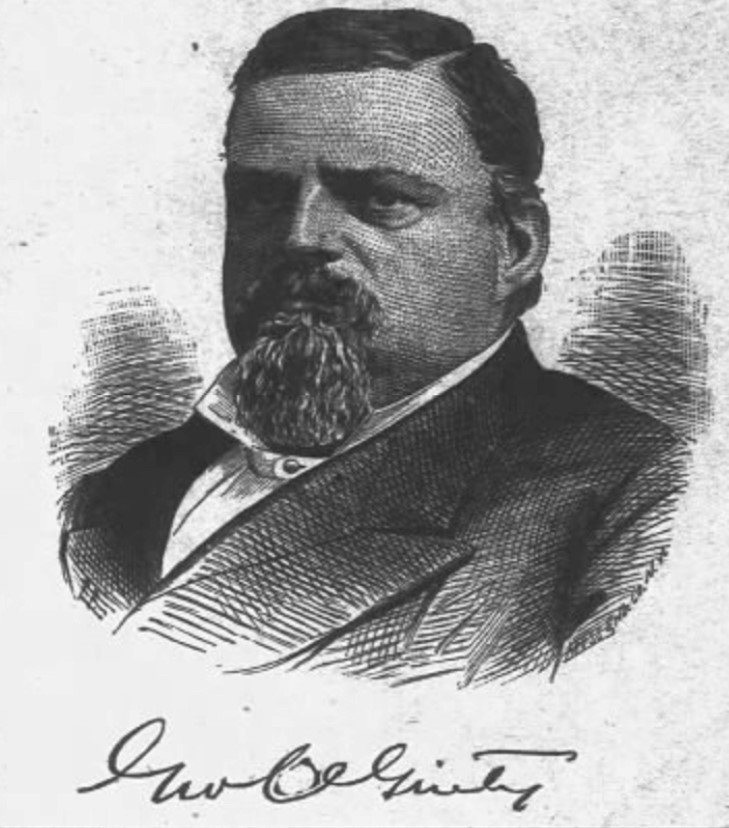

Member of the Wisconsin Senate from the 30th district
- In office January 5, 1885 – January 7, 1889
- Preceded by: Rockwell J. Flint
- Succeeded by: William Millar

Member of the Wisconsin State Assembly from the Door–Oconto–Shawano district
- In office January 5, 1863 – January 4, 1864
- Preceded by: Ezra B. Stevens
- Succeeded by: Herman Naber

Personal details
- Born: February 14, 1840 Toronto, Upper Canada, British North America
- Died: December 9, 1890 (aged 50) Madison, Wisconsin, U.S.
- Cause of death: Liver dysfunction
- Resting place: Forest Hill Cemetery; Chippewa Falls, Wisconsin
- Party: Republican
- Spouse: Flora Beall Outhwaite (m. 1861; died 1907)

Military service
- Allegiance: United States
- Branch/service: United States Army; Union Army
- Years of service: 1864–1865
- Rank: Colonel, USV; Brevet Brig. General, USV
- Commands: 47th Reg. Wis. Vol. Infantry
- Battles/wars: American Civil War: Second Battle of Memphis

George Clay Ginty (February 14, 1840 – December 9, 1890) was a Canadian American immigrant, politician, and journalist. A Republican, he was elected to one term each in the Wisconsin State Senate and Assembly and was founder of the Green Bay Gazette which still operates today as the Green Bay Press-Gazette—the main local paper of Green Bay, Wisconsin. He also served as a Union Army officer in the American Civil War and a United States Marshal near the end of his life.

== Biography ==
Ginty was born in Toronto, Ontario in 1840. He moved with his parents to Racine, Wisconsin in 1853. In 1859, he moved to Oconto, Wisconsin. Ginty later moved to Green Bay, Wisconsin and Chippewa Falls, Wisconsin. He died in Madison, Wisconsin on December 9, 1890. At the time of his death, he was a member of the United States Marshals Service, acting as Marshal of the Western District of Wisconsin.

== Newspaper career ==
Ginty founded the Oconto Pioneer in 1859 and served as editor and publisher of the paper until 1865. In 1866, he founded the Green Bay Gazette and in 1868, he founded the Chippewa Falls Herald. He later served as editor and publisher of the Herald from 1870 to 1890. From 1875 to 1878, Ginty was president of the Wisconsin Editorial Association.

== Military career ==
Ginty joined the Union Army in 1864 during the American Civil War as major of the 39th Wisconsin Volunteer Infantry Regiment on June 3, 1864. He was mustered out of the volunteers on September 22, 1864. He rejoined the army on February 23, 1865, as colonel of the 47th Wisconsin Volunteer Infantry Regiment. He was mustered out of the volunteers after this service on September 4, 1865. On January 13, 1866, President Andrew Johnson nominated Ginty for appointment to the grade of brevet brigadier general of volunteers to rank from September 28, 1865, and the United States Senate confirmed the appointment on March 12, 1866.

== Political career ==
Ginty was a member of the Wisconsin State Assembly in 1863 and the Wisconsin State Senate from 1884 to 1888. He was a Republican.

Military offices
Regiment created	Command of the 47th Wisconsin Volunteer Infantry Regiment; February 27, 1865 – September 8, 1865	Regiment abolished
Wisconsin State Assembly
Preceded by Ezra B. Stevens	Member of the Wisconsin State Assembly from the Door–Oconto–Shawano district January 5, 1863 – January 4, 1864	Succeeded by Herman Naber
Wisconsin Senate
Preceded by Rockwell J. Flint	Member of the Wisconsin Senate from the 30th district January 5, 1885 – January 7, 1889	Succeeded by William Miller
