= 25th Wisconsin Infantry Regiment =

Union Army infantry regiment

- Flag of Wisconsin
- Active: September 14, 1862 – June 7, 1865
- Country: United States
- Allegiance: Union
- Branch: Infantry
- Size: Regiment
- Engagements: Dakota War of 1862; American Civil War: Siege of Vicksburg; Battle of Resaca; Battle of Kennesaw Mountain; Battle of Atlanta; Skirmishes at Decatur; Battle of Bentonville

Commanders
- Colonel: Milton Montgomery
- Lt. Col.: Samuel J. Nasmith
- Lt. Col.: Jeremiah McLain Rusk
- Major: William H. Joslin

The 25th Wisconsin Infantry Regiment was a volunteer infantry regiment that served in the Union Army during the American Civil War. During their service, they first participated in the Dakota War of 1862, then spent most of the rest of the war in the western theater.

== Service ==
The 25th Wisconsin was organized at La Crosse, Wisconsin, and mustered into Federal service September 14, 1862. The Regiment was immediately sent west to help Minnesota deal with the Sioux uprising. Wisconsin was part of the Army's newly formed Department of Dakota that had been created to deal with the problem. The Department was Headquartered at St. Paul under the command of Major General John Pope. The Regiment arrived at Fort Snelling on the 22nd of September. General Pope wanted to create a line of outposts from Fairmount to Alexandria with the 25th: Hq- New Ulm, A Co- Fairmount, B Co-Alexandria, C Co- Sauk Center, D, F, & I- Mankato, G Co- Richmond, E & H Co Paynesville and K Co- Winnebago. Colonel Montgomery later moved the Hq to Mankato. In November Company F was tasked with burying the dead at Lake Shetek. They reported only finding skeletal remains, some of which had been burnt by prairie fires.

In a January 1863 letter to his sister, Union soldier Chauncey H. Cooke, a private from the regiment's Company G, gave his reasons for fighting for the Union in the war, stating that "I have no heart in this war if the slaves cannot go free."

The regiment was mustered out on June 7, 1865.

== Casualties ==
The 25th Wisconsin suffered 3 officers and 46 enlisted men killed in action or who later died of their wounds, plus another 7 officers and 402 enlisted men who died of disease, for a total of 460 fatalities.

== Commanders ==
- Colonel Milton Montgomery (August 16, 1862 – June 7, 1865) was placed in command of the provisional division from June 6 to July 28, 1863, and then commanded the brigade from February 3 to April 11, 1864. He was wounded and captured on July 22, 1864, at Decatur, and his arm was amputated. He was released in a prisoner exchange in January 1865, and was then placed back in command of the brigade from February 1 through April 1, 1865. He received an honorary brevet to brigadier general after the war.
  - Lt. Colonel Samuel J. Nasmith (June 6, 1863 – July 28, 1863) commanded the regiment while Montgomery was in command of the provisional division. Died of disease on August 17, 1863.
  - Lt. Colonel Jeremiah McLain Rusk (February 3, 1864 – April 11, 1864; July 22, 1864 – January 12, 1865; February 1, 1865 – April 1, 1865) commanded the regiment when Montgomery was in command of the brigade or imprisoned. Received an honorary brevet to brigadier general. After the war he became the 15th governor of Wisconsin and the 2nd United States Secretary of Agriculture.
  - Major William H. Joslin (September 16, 1864 – October 25, 1864) commanded the regiment while Rusk was absent. He was previously captain of Co. B. After the war he served in the Wisconsin Assembly.

== Notable officers and personnel ==
- Charles H. Baxter was a corporal in Co. C, was wounded and discharged, but later re-enlisted with the 41st Wisconsin Infantry Regiment, and was then commissioned captain of Co. K in the 47th Wisconsin Infantry Regiment. After the war he became a Wisconsin state senator and mayor of Lancaster, Wisconsin.
- William H. Bennett, brother of Van S. Bennett, was captain of Co. B. He was wounded and captured at Decatur. After three ascending amputation attempts on his leg, he died of his infected wound.
- Menzus R. Bump was enlisted in Co. G and rose to the rank of first sergeant. After the war he served in the Wisconsin Assembly.
- Cyrus M. Butt was first lieutenant for Co. A, and later became a major for the 48th Wisconsin Infantry Regiment. He was promoted to lieutenant colonel but never mustered in federal service at that rank. After the war he served in the Wisconsin State Senate.
- Jasper Cabanis, son of George Cabanis, was a private in Co. I and died of disease in 1862.
- James DeMott Condit was captain of Co. D. After the war he served in the Wisconsin Assembly.
- Chauncey H. Cooke was a private in Co. G. His letters describing his service in the war were published as a book.
- Allen H. DeGroff was a private in Co. G. He was among the youngest Wisconsin volunteers at 15 years and 4 months at the time of his enlistment. After the 25th Wisconsin was mustered out, he served one more month with the 12th Wisconsin Infantry Regiment. After the war he served in the Wisconsin Assembly.
- John W. DeGroff was a private in Co. G. After the war he served in the Wisconsin Assembly and Senate.
- Vivus Wright Dorwin was captain of Co. G. After the war he served in the Wisconsin Assembly.
- Charles A. Hunt was first lieutenant and later captain of Co. K. He also served much of 1864 as acting quartermaster of the regiment. After the war he served in the Wisconsin Assembly and was appointed superintendent for the removal of the Winnebago people from Wisconsin in the 1870s.
- Edward I. Kidd was enlisted in Co. C. After the war he served in the Wisconsin Assembly and Senate, and was the state bank examiner.
- James B. McCoy was enlisted in Co. E and was later commissioned 1st lieutenant. After the war he served in the Wisconsin Assembly.
- David Schreiner was enlisted in Co. C, was wounded at Atlanta and lost his left arm. After the war he served in the Wisconsin Assembly.
- Michael J. Warner was enlisted in Co. K and discharged for disability in 1863. After the war he served in the Wisconsin Assembly.
- Thomas C. Woodard, father of Western Woodard, was enlisted in Co. F, rising to the rank of sergeant.
- David C. Yakey was enlisted in Co. A and reached the rank of sergeant. After the war he served in the Wisconsin Assembly.
- Phillip K. Roesch was enlisted in Co. H and was the author of "Civil War Diary of Philip K. Roesch: Kept all during my service August 6, 1862 to June 11, 1865 Company H 25th Regiment of Wisconsin Volunteers."

== See also ==
- List of Wisconsin Civil War units
- Wisconsin in the American Civil War
