= Marcellus Dorwin =

American politician

Marcellus Dorwin was a member of the Wisconsin State Assembly.

== Biography ==
Dorwin was born on February 14, 1861, in Durand (town), Wisconsin. His father, Vivus Wright Dorwin, was also a member of the Assembly. The younger Dorwin attended what would become Gale College and what is now Valparaiso University. He died in 1925.

== Political career ==
Dorwin was elected to the Assembly in 1924. Additionally, he was Town Chairman (similar to Mayor) of Durand and Chairman of the Pepin County, Wisconsin Board of Supervisors. He was a Republican.
