= Menzus R. Bump =

American politician (1838–1913)

Member of the Wisconsin State Assembly from the Dunn–Pepin district
- In office January 3, 1876 – January 1, 1877
- Preceded by: Rockwell J. Flint
- Succeeded by: Samuel Black (Dunn); Vivus Wright Dorwin (Pepin)

Personal details
- Born: May 28, 1838 Granville, New York, U.S.
- Died: May 6, 1913 (aged 74) Spokane, Washington, U.S.
- Cause of death: Pneumonia
- Resting place: Greenwood Memorial Terrace, Spokane, Washington
- Party: Republican
- Spouse: Elma A. Crocker (m. 1868; died 1911)
- Children: Mrs. Maud Churchill; Mrs. L. J. Parks; Milan R. Bump

Military service
- Allegiance: United States
- Branch/service: United States Army; Union Army
- Rank: 1st Sergeant, USV
- Unit: 25th Reg. Wis. Vol. Infantry
- Battles/wars: American Civil War

Menzus Raynard Bump (May 28, 1838 – May 6, 1913) was an American businessman and Republican politician. He served one term in the Wisconsin State Assembly, representing Dunn and Pepin counties, and was a Union Army volunteer in the American Civil War.

== Biography ==
Bump was born in Granville, New York. He moved to Mondovi, Wisconsin, before settling in Rock Creek, Wisconsin, in 1868.

During the American Civil War, Bump served in the 25th Wisconsin Infantry Regiment of the Union Army. Engagements he took part in include the Battle of Resaca of the Atlanta campaign. He achieved the rank of first sergeant.

Bump married Elma A. Crocker on November 1, 1868, in Eau Claire County, Wisconsin. They had three children. Bump was designated postmaster of Caryville, Wisconsin, in 1882. Bump died on May 6, 1913, in Spokane, Washington.

== Political career ==
Bump was a member of the Assembly in 1876. Additionally, he was chairman of the board of Rock Creek. He was a Republican.

Wisconsin State Assembly
Preceded by Rockwell J. Flint	Member of the Wisconsin State Assembly from the Dunn–Pepin district January 3, 1876 – January 1, 1877	Succeeded by Samuel Black (Dunn); Vivus Wright Dorwin (Pepin)
