= James B. McCoy =

American politician

James B. McCoy (April 22, 1839 – 1911) was a member of the Wisconsin State Assembly.

== Biography ==
McCoy was born on April 22, 1839, in Peoria, Illinois. He attended what is now the University of Wisconsin-Platteville. During the American Civil War, McCoy served with the 25th Wisconsin Volunteer Infantry Regiment of the Union Army. Originally an enlisted man, he achieved the rank of first lieutenant. He died of an intestinal ailment in late July or early August 1911.

== Political career ==
McCoy was elected to the Assembly in 1886 and 1888. Previously, he had been elected Sheriff of Grant County, Wisconsin, in 1874. He was a Republican.
