= 2022 United States House of Representatives elections in Wisconsin =

- November 8, 2022

All 8 Wisconsin seats to the United States House of Representatives
	Majority party	Minority party
Party	Republican	Democratic
Last election	5	3
Seats won	6	2
Seat change	▲1	▼1
Popular vote	1,403,080	1,012,955
Percentage	55.54%	40.10%
Swing	▲4.11%	▼8.40%

Republican hold Republican gain
Democratic hold
Republican
40–50%
50–60%
60–70%
70–80%
80–90%
>90%
Democratic
50–60%
60–70%
70–80%

The 2022 United States House of Representatives elections in Wisconsin were held on November 8, 2022, to elect the eight U.S. representatives from the state of Wisconsin, one from each of the state's eight congressional districts. The elections coincided with other elections to the House of Representatives, elections to the United States Senate, and various state and local elections. Primaries were held on August 9, 2022. The Republican Party won a majority of Wisconsin's U.S. House delegation, as well as 55.5 percent of the statewide vote.

== Results summary ==
=== Statewide ===
Party	Candi- dates	Votes		Seats		
Party	Candi- dates	No.	%	No.	+/–	%
Republican Party	8	1,403,080	55.54%	6	▲1	75.00%
Democratic Party	6	1,012,955	40.10%	2	▼1	25.00%
Independent	5	78,058	3.09%	0	Steady	0%
Libertarian Party	1	32,057	1.27%	0	Steady	0%
Total	20	2,526,150	100%	8	Steady	100%

Popular vote
Republican	55.54%
Democratic	40.10%
Independent	3.09%
Libertarian	1.27%

House seats
Republican	75.0%
Democratic	25.0%

=== District ===
Results of the 2022 United States House of Representatives elections in Wisconsin by district:

District	Republican		Democratic		Others		Total		Result
District	Votes	%	Votes	%	Votes	%	Votes	%	Result
District 1	162,610	54.05%	135,825	45.14%	2,432	0.81%	300,867	100.00%	Republican hold
District 2	101,890	26.92%	268,740	70.99%	7,907	2.09%	378,537	100.00%	Democratic hold
District 3	164,743	51.82%	152,977	48.12%	202	0.06%	317,922	100.00%	Republican gain
District 4	57,660	23.08%	191,955	76.83%	223	0.09%	249,838	100.00%	Democratic hold
District 5	243,741	64.39%	134,581	35.55%	201	0.05%	378,523	100.00%	Republican hold
District 6	239,231	94.93%	0	0%	12,768	5.07%	251,999	100.00%	Republican hold
District 7	209,224	61.85%	128,877	38.10%	167	0.05%	338,268	100.00%	Republican hold
District 8	223,981	72.21%	0	0%	86,215	27.79%	310,196	100.00%	Republican hold
Total	1,403,080	55.54%	1,012,955	40.10%	110,115	4.36%	2,526,150	100.00%	

== District 1 ==
2022 Wisconsin's 1st congressional district election
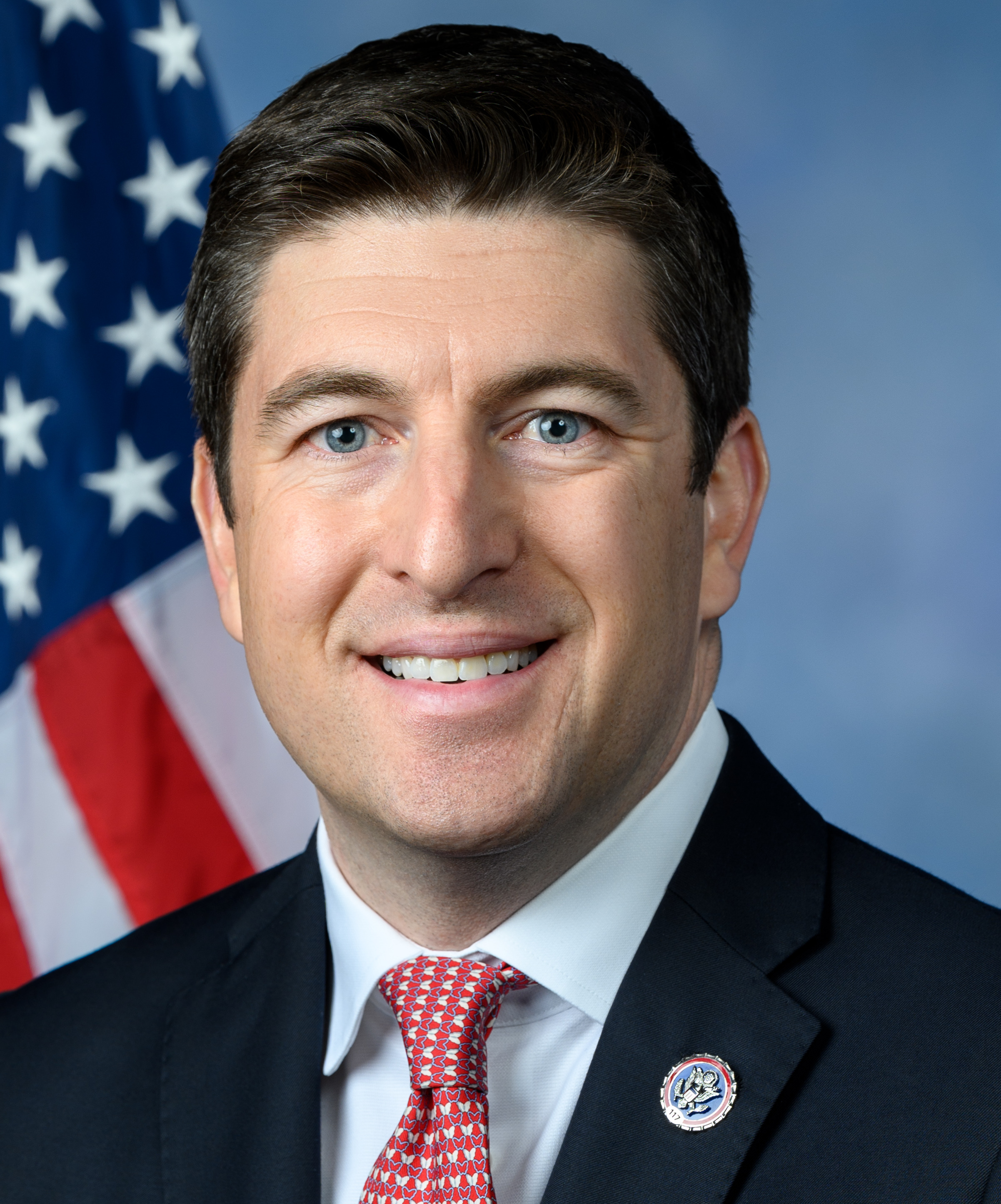

Nominee	Bryan Steil	Ann Roe
Party	Republican	Democratic
Popular vote	162,610	135,825
Percentage	54.1%	45.1%
- Steil: 40–50% 50–60% 60–70% 70–80% 80–90% >90% Roe: 40–50% 50–60% 60–70% 70–80% 80–90% Tie
U.S. Representative before election
Bryan Steil
Republican
Elected U.S. Representative
Bryan Steil
Republican

The 1st district encompasses Janesville, Kenosha, and Racine. The incumbent was Republican Bryan Steil, who had represented the district since 2019 and was re-elected with 59.3% of the vote in 2020.

=== Republican primary ===
==== Candidates ====
===== Nominee =====
- Bryan Steil, incumbent U.S. representative

==== Primary results ====
Republican primary results
Party	Candidate	Votes	%
Republican	Bryan Steil (incumbent)	73,191	99.2
Write-in		571	0.8
Total votes		73,762	100.0

=== Democratic primary ===
==== Candidates ====
===== Nominee =====
- Ann Roe, businesswoman and activist

==== Endorsements ====
Ann Roe

State legislators

- Mark Spreitzer, state assemblyman from the 45th district

Local officials

- Anthony Kennedy, Kenosha alderman
- Rollin Pizzala, Kenosha alderman
- Donald Trottier, member of the Racine County board of supervisors

Organizations

- NARAL Pro-Choice America

Labor unions

- Service Employees International Union
- Wisconsin AFL–CIO

==== Primary results ====
Democratic primary results
Party	Candidate	Votes	%
Democratic	Ann Roe	48,148	99.8
Write-in		112	0.2
Total votes		48,260	100.0

=== Independents ===
==== Candidates ====
===== Declared =====
- Charles Barman

=== General election ===
==== Predictions ====
Source	Ranking	As of
The Cook Political Report	Solid R	March 8, 2022
Inside Elections	Solid R	March 15, 2022
Sabato's Crystal Ball	Safe R	July 28, 2022
Politico	Likely R	April 5, 2022
RCP	Safe R	June 9, 2022
Fox News	Solid R	July 11, 2022
DDHQ	Solid R	July 20, 2022
538	Solid R	June 30, 2022
The Economist	Likely R	September 28, 2022

==== Results ====
Wisconsin's 1st congressional district, 2022
Party	Candidate	Votes	%
Republican	Bryan Steil (incumbent)	162,610	54.1
Democratic	Ann Roe	135,825	45.1
Independent	Charles Barman	2,247	0.7
Write-in		185	0.1
Total votes		300,867	100.0
Republican hold			

== District 2 ==
2022 Wisconsin's 2nd congressional district election
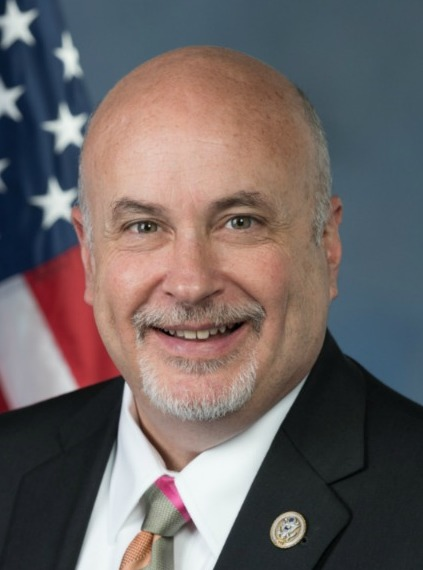

Nominee	Mark Pocan	Erik Olsen
Party	Democratic	Republican
Popular vote	268,740	101,890
Percentage	71.0%	26.9%
- Pocan: 40–50% 50–60% 60–70% 70–80% 80–90% >90% Olsen: 40–50% 50–60% 60–70% 70–80% >90% Tie: 40–50% No votes
U.S. Representative before election
Mark Pocan
Democratic
Elected U.S. Representative
Mark Pocan
Democratic

The 2nd congressional district covers Dane County, Iowa County, Lafayette County, Sauk County and Green County, as well as portions of Richland County and Rock County. The district includes Madison, the state's capital, its suburbs and some of the surrounding areas. The incumbent was Democrat Mark Pocan, who was elected with 69.7% of the vote in 2020.

=== Democratic primary ===
==== Candidates ====
===== Nominee =====
- Mark Pocan, incumbent U.S. representative

==== Endorsements ====
Mark Pocan

Organizations

- Progressive Democrats of America
- Sierra Club

Labor unions

- Wisconsin AFL–CIO

==== Primary results ====
Democratic primary results
Party	Candidate	Votes	%
Democratic	Mark Pocan (incumbent)	106,595	99.8
Write-in		198	0.2
Total votes		106,793	100.0

=== Republican primary ===
==== Candidates ====
===== Nominee =====
- Erik Olsen, attorney

===== Eliminated in primary =====
- Charity Barry, businesswoman

===== Failed to qualify =====
- Peter Theron, Republican nominee for this district in 2020, 2016, 2014 and 2008

==== Primary results ====
Republican primary results
Party	Candidate	Votes	%
Republican	Erik Olsen	21,774	49.8
Republican	Charity Barry	21,711	49.7
Write-in		225	0.5
Total votes		43,710	100.0

=== Independents ===
==== Candidates ====
===== Declared =====
- Douglas Alexander

=== General election ===
==== Predictions ====
Source	Ranking	As of
The Cook Political Report	Solid D	March 8, 2022
Inside Elections	Solid D	March 15, 2022
Sabato's Crystal Ball	Safe D	March 9, 2022
Politico	Solid D	April 5, 2022
RCP	Safe D	June 9, 2022
Fox News	Solid D	July 11, 2022
DDHQ	Solid D	July 20, 2022
538	Solid D	June 30, 2022
The Economist	Safe D	September 28, 2022

==== Results ====
Wisconsin's 2nd congressional district, 2022
Party	Candidate	Votes	%
Democratic	Mark Pocan (incumbent)	268,740	71.0
Republican	Erik Olsen	101,890	26.9
Independent	Douglas Alexander	7,689	2.0
Write-in		218	0.1
Total votes		378,537	100.0
Democratic hold			

== District 3 ==
2022 Wisconsin's 3rd congressional district election
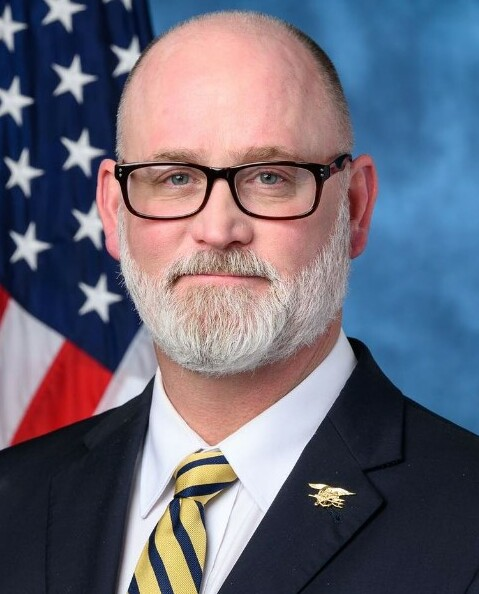

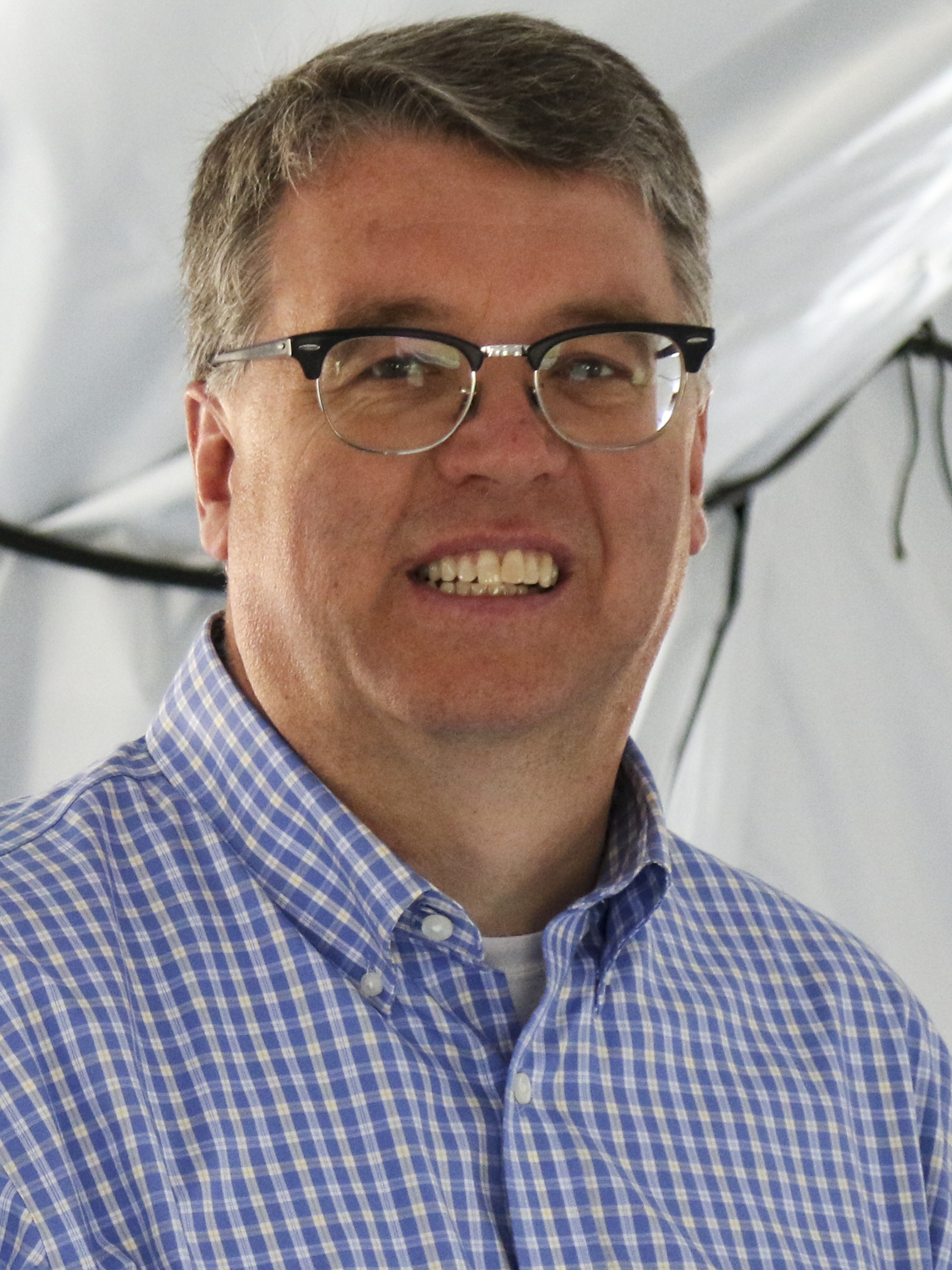
Nominee	Derrick Van Orden	Brad Pfaff
Party	Republican	Democratic
Popular vote	164,743	152,977
Percentage	51.8%	48.1%
- Van Orden: 50–60% 60–70% 70–80% 80–90% >90% Pfaff: 50–60% 60–70% 70–80% 80–90% Tie: 50% No votes
U.S. Representative before election
Ron Kind
Democratic
Elected U.S. Representative
Derrick Van Orden
Republican

The 3rd district takes in the Driftless Area in southwestern Wisconsin including Eau Claire and La Crosse. The incumbent was Democrat Ron Kind, who was reelected with 51.3% of the vote in 2020. On August 10, 2021, Kind announced his retirement.

=== Democratic primary ===
==== Candidates ====
===== Nominee =====
- Brad Pfaff, state senator

===== Eliminated in primary =====
- Rebecca Cooke, businesswoman
- Deb McGrath, former Army captain and CIA officer, and daughter of former U.S. representative Alvin Baldus
- Mark Neumann, La Crosse City Council member, retired pediatrician, and candidate for this district in 2020

===== Withdrew =====
- Brett Knudsen, podcast host and U.S Navy veteran

===== Declined =====
- Ron Kind, incumbent U.S. representative

==== Endorsements ====
Rebecca Cooke

Federal officials

- Ada Deer, former Assistant Secretary of the Interior for Indian Affairs (1993–1997)

State officials

- Barbara Lawton, former lieutenant governor of Wisconsin (2003–2011)

Labor unions

- Eau Claire Firefighters Local 487
- International Association of Fire Fighters Local 487
- International Union of Painters and Allied Trades District Councils 7 & 82
- Service Employees International Union Wisconsin State Council
- Stevens Point Firefighters, IAFF Local 484
- Wisconsin Rapids Firefighters Local 425
Brad Pfaff

U.S. senators

- Herb Kohl, former U.S. senator from Wisconsin (1989–2013)

U.S. representatives

- Ron Kind, U.S. representative from WI-03 (1997–present)

State legislators

- Patty Schachtner, former state senator from the 10th district (2018–2021)

Organizations

- League of Conservation Voters
- New Democrat Coalition Action Fund
- Sierra Club

Labor unions

- International Brotherhood of Electrical Workers Local 2150
Deb McGrath

U.S. ambassadors

- John Beyrle, former U.S. ambassador to Bulgaria (2005–2008) and Russia (2008–2012)
- Robert S. Gelbard, former U.S. ambassador to Bolivia (1988–1991) and Indonesia (1999–2001)
- Jeffrey D. Levine, former U.S. ambassador to Estonia (2012–2015) (Note: Article says ambassador-at-large.)
- Thomas Bolling Robertson, former U.S. ambassador to Slovenia (2004–2007)
- John Tefft, former U.S. ambassador to Lithuania (2000–2003), Georgia (2005–2009), Ukraine (2009–2013) and Russia (2014–2017)

CIA officials

- James Pavitt, former CIA Deputy Director for Operations (1999–2004)

Military officials

- Steve Anderson, retired brigadier general
- Kevin Ryan, retired brigadier general
- Peter Zwack, retired brigadier general

U.S. representatives

- Seth Moulton, U.S. representative from Massachusetts's 6th congressional district (2015–)
- Abigail Spanberger, U.S. representative from Virginia's 7th congressional district (2019–2025)

State officials

- Kathleen Vinehout, former state senator from the 31st district (2007–2019)
- Dana Wachs, former state representative from the 91st district (2013–2019)

Local officials

- Emily Berge, Eau Claire city councilwoman
- Ryland Erdman, Menomonie city councilman
- Meleesa Johnson, Stevens Point city council president
- Rod Jones, Eau Claire city councilman
- Margaret Larson, La Crosse County board member
- Joshua Miller, Eau Claire city councilman

Organizations

- Elect Democratic Women
- Minocqua Brewing Company
- New Politics
- VoteVets.org

==== Debate ====
2022 Wisconsin's 3rd congressional district democratic primary debate
No.	Date	Host	Moderator	Link	Democratic	Democratic	Democratic	Democratic
Key: P Participant A Absent N Not invited I Invited W Withdrawn								
Key: P Participant A Absent N Not invited I Invited W Withdrawn					Rebecca Cooke	Deb McGrath	Mark Neumann	Brad Pfaff
1	Jul. 23, 2022				P	P	P	P

==== Primary results ====
Primary results by county: Pfaff: 40–50%; 50–60%; 60–70%; Cooke: 30–40%; 40–50%; 50–60%; McGrath: 40–50%

Democratic primary results
Party	Candidate	Votes	%
Democratic	Brad Pfaff	24,041	39.0
Democratic	Rebecca Cooke	19,221	31.2
Democratic	Deb McGrath	11,770	19.1
Democratic	Mark Neumann	6,672	10.8
Write-in		25	0.0
Total votes		61,729	100.0

=== Republican primary ===
==== Candidates ====
===== Nominee =====
- Derrick Van Orden, retired Navy SEAL and nominee for this district in 2020

===== Withdrawn =====
- Denise Hurless

==== Endorsements ====
Derrick Van Orden

U.S. executive branch officials

- Richard Grenell, former United States Ambassador to Germany (2018–2020)
- Nikki Haley, former United States Ambassador to the United Nations (2017–2018)
- Donald Trump, 45th president of the United States (2017–2021)

U.S. senators

- Tim Scott, U.S. senator from South Carolina (2013–)

Sheriffs

- 15 county sheriffs

Organizations

- Congressional Leadership Fund
- Republican Jewish Coalition
- Tea Party Express
- Wisconsin Fraternal Order of Police

==== Primary results ====
Republican primary results
Party	Candidate	Votes	%
Republican	Derrick Van Orden	65,164	99.3
Write-in		471	0.7
Total votes		65,635	100.0

=== General election ===
==== Predictions ====
Source	Ranking	As of
The Cook Political Report	Likely R (flip)	October 25, 2022
Inside Elections	Lean R (flip)	March 15, 2022
Sabato's Crystal Ball	Likely R (flip)	October 12, 2022
Politico	Likely R (flip)	October 18, 2022
RCP	Likely R (flip)	October 26, 2022
Fox News	Lean R (flip)	September 20, 2022
DDHQ	Solid R (flip)	July 20, 2022
538	Likely R (flip)	October 6, 2022
The Economist	Likely R (flip)	September 28, 2022

==== Polling ====
Poll source	Date(s) administered	Sample size (Note: Key: A – all adults RV – registered voters LV – likely voters V – unclear)	Margin of error	Brad Pfaff (D)	Derrick Van Orden (R)	Undecided
Public Policy Polling (D) (Note: This poll was sponsored by Pfaff's campaign)	August 18–19, 2022	626 (V)	± 3.9%	40%	45%	15%
Cygnal (R) (Note: This poll was sponsored by the Congressional Leadership Fund)	August 15–18, 2022	403 (LV)	± 4.9%	38%	50%	12%

Hypothetical polling

Deb McGrath vs. Derrick Van Orden

Poll source	Date(s) administered	Sample size	Margin of error	Deb McGrath (D)	Derrick Van Orden (R)	Undecided
Public Policy Polling (D) (Note: This poll was sponsored by McGrath's campaign)	June 1–2, 2022	602 (V)	± 4.0%	38%	47%	15%

Generic Democrat vs. generic Republican

Poll source	Date(s) administered	Sample size	Margin of error	Generic Democrat	Generic Republican	Undecided
Cygnal (R)	August 15–18, 2022	403 (LV)	± 4.9%	41%	51%	9%

==== Results ====
Although some prediction sites such as DDHQ gave a "Solid R" prediction, Van Orden faced a relatively more competitive race than some had predicted, as Pfaff made a more competitive performance than expected. As a result, Van Orden won only by a near 4% margin.

Wisconsin's 3rd congressional district, 2022
Party	Candidate	Votes	%
Republican	Derrick Van Orden	164,743	51.8
Democratic	Brad Pfaff	152,977	48.1
Write-in		202	0.1
Total votes		317,922	100.0
Republican gain from Democratic			

== District 4 ==
2022 Wisconsin's 4th congressional district election
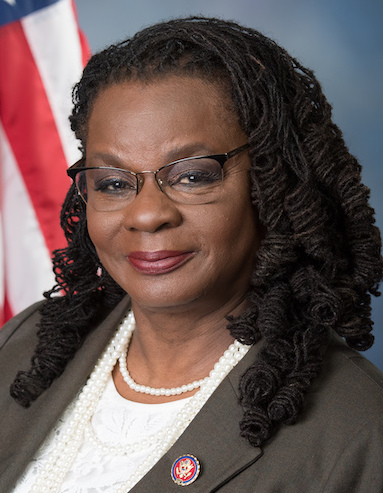

Nominee	Gwen Moore	Tim Rogers
Party	Democratic	Republican
Popular vote	191,955	57,660
Percentage	75.3%	22.6%
- Moore: 40–50% 50–60% 60–70% 70–80% 80–90% >90% Rogers: 40–50% 50–60% Tie
U.S. Representative before election
Gwen Moore
Democratic
Elected U.S. Representative
Gwen Moore
Democratic

The 4th district encompasses Milwaukee County, taking in the city of Milwaukee and its working-class suburbs of Cudahy, St. Francis, South Milwaukee, and West Milwaukee, as well as the North Shore communities of Glendale, Shorewood, Whitefish Bay, Fox Point, Bayside, and Brown Deer. The incumbent was Democrat Gwen Moore, who was reelected with 74.7% of the vote in 2020.

=== Democratic primary ===
==== Candidates ====
===== Nominee =====
- Gwen Moore, incumbent U.S. representative

==== Endorsements ====
Gwen Moore

Organizations

- Feminist Majority PAC
- Sierra Club

Labor unions

- Wisconsin AFL–CIO

==== Primary results ====
Democratic primary results
Party	Candidate	Votes	%
Democratic	Gwen Moore (incumbent)	72,845	99.6
Write-in		325	0.4
Total votes		73,170	100.0

=== Republican primary ===
==== Candidates ====
===== Nominee =====
- Tim Rogers, nominee for this district in 2020

===== Eliminated in primary =====
- Travis Clark

==== Primary results ====
Republican primary results
Party	Candidate	Votes	%
Republican	Tim Rogers	16,528	74.3
Republican	Travis Clark	5,583	25.1
Write-in		135	0.6
Total votes		22,246	100.0

=== Independents ===
==== Candidates ====
===== Declared =====
- Robert Raymond

=== General election ===
==== Predictions ====
Source	Ranking	As of
The Cook Political Report	Solid D	March 8, 2022
Inside Elections	Solid D	March 15, 2022
Sabato's Crystal Ball	Safe D	March 9, 2022
Politico	Solid D	April 5, 2022
RCP	Safe D	June 9, 2022
Fox News	Solid D	July 11, 2022
DDHQ	Solid D	July 20, 2022
538	Solid D	June 30, 2022
The Economist	Safe D	September 28, 2022

==== Results ====
Wisconsin's 4th congressional district, 2022
Party	Candidate	Votes	%
Democratic	Gwen Moore (incumbent)	191,955	75.3
Republican	Tim Rogers	57,660	22.6
Independent	Robert Raymond	5,164	2.0
Write-in		233	0.1
Total votes		255,012	100.0
Democratic hold			

== District 5 ==
2022 Wisconsin's 5th congressional district election
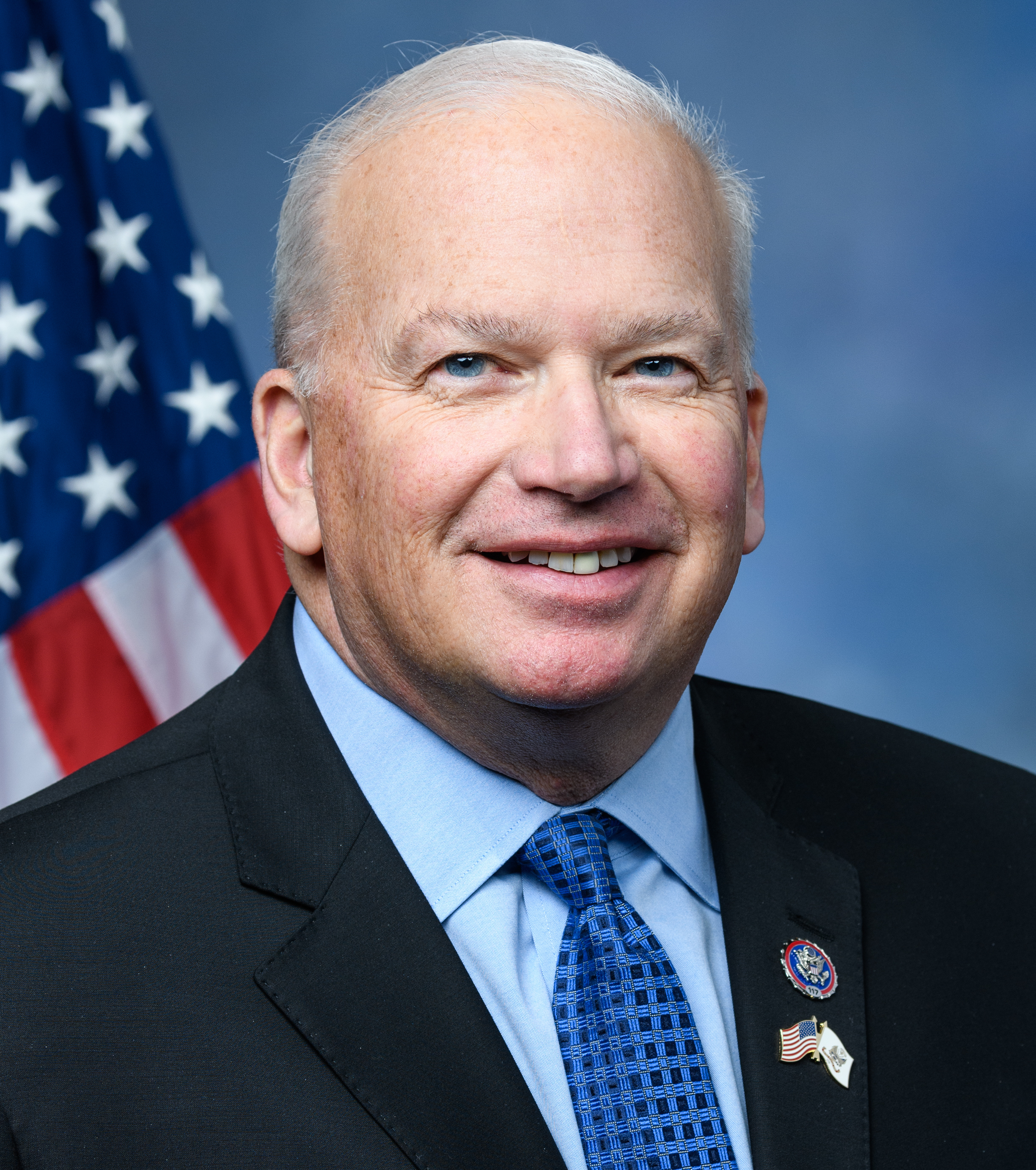

Nominee	Scott Fitzgerald	Mike Van Someren
Party	Republican	Democratic
Popular vote	243,741	134,581
Percentage	64.4%	35.6%
- Fitzgerald: 50–60% 60–70% 70–80% 80–90% >90% Van Someren: 50–60% 60–70% 70–80% Tie: 50% No votes
U.S. Representative before election
Scott Fitzgerald
Republican
Elected U.S. Representative
Scott Fitzgerald
Republican

The 5th district takes in the northern and western suburbs of Milwaukee, including Washington County, Jefferson County, as well as most of Waukesha County. The incumbent was Republican Scott Fitzgerald, who was elected with 60.1% of the vote in 2020.

=== Republican primary ===
==== Candidates ====
===== Nominee =====
- Scott Fitzgerald, incumbent U.S. representative

==== Primary results ====
Republican primary results
Party	Candidate	Votes	%
Republican	Scott Fitzgerald (incumbent)	118,411	99.4
Write-in		769	0.6
Total votes		119,180	100.0

=== Democratic primary ===
==== Candidates ====
===== Nominee =====
- Mike Van Someren, attorney

===== Failed to qualify =====
- Ronald Remmel, medical electronics manufacturer and college professor

===== Withdrawn =====
- Jessica Katzenmeyer (running for State Senate)

==== Endorsements ====
Jessica Katzenmeyer (withdrawn)

State legislators

- Jonathan Brostoff, state assemblyman from the 19th district (2015-2022)
- Tim Carpenter, state senator from the 3rd district (2003-)
- Francesca Hong, state assemblywoman from the 76th district (2021-)
- LaTonya Johnson, state senator from the 6th district (2017-)
- Greta Neubauer, Minority Leader of the Wisconsin State Assembly

County officials

- George Christenson, Milwaukee County county clerk
- Ryan Clancy, Milwaukee County county supervisor
- Jason Haas, Milwaukee County county supervisor
- Michelle Ritt, Dane County county supervisor
- Zoe Roberts, Eau Claire County county supervisor
- Emily Voight, Calumet County county supervisor

City officials

- Kate Cronin, Verona alderman
- Bryan Kennedy, Glendale mayor
- Lindsay Lemmer, Madison alderwoman
- Vered Meltzer, Appleton alderwoman
- Regina Vidaver, Madison alderwoman
- Vince Vitale, West Allis alderman
- Aaron Wojciechowski, Oshkosh city councilman
- JoCasta Zamarripa, member of the Milwaukee Common Council

Organizations

- Freethought Equality Fund PAC
- LPAC

==== Primary results ====
Democratic primary results
Party	Candidate	Votes	%
Democratic	Mike Van Someren	44,305	99.9
Write-in		62	0.1
Total votes		44,367	100.0

=== General election ===
==== Predictions ====
Source	Ranking	As of
The Cook Political Report	Solid R	March 8, 2022
Inside Elections	Solid R	March 15, 2022
Sabato's Crystal Ball	Safe R	March 9, 2022
Politico	Solid R	April 5, 2022
RCP	Safe R	June 9, 2022
Fox News	Solid R	July 11, 2022
DDHQ	Solid R	July 20, 2022
538	Solid R	June 30, 2022
The Economist	Safe R	September 28, 2022

==== Endorsements ====
Mike Van Someren (D)

Organizations

- Sierra Club

==== Results ====
Wisconsin's 5th congressional district, 2022
Party	Candidate	Votes	%
Republican	Scott Fitzgerald (incumbent)	243,741	64.4
Democratic	Mike Van Someren	134,581	35.5
Write-in		201	0.1
Total votes		378,523	100.0
Republican hold			

== District 6 ==
2022 Wisconsin's 6th congressional district election
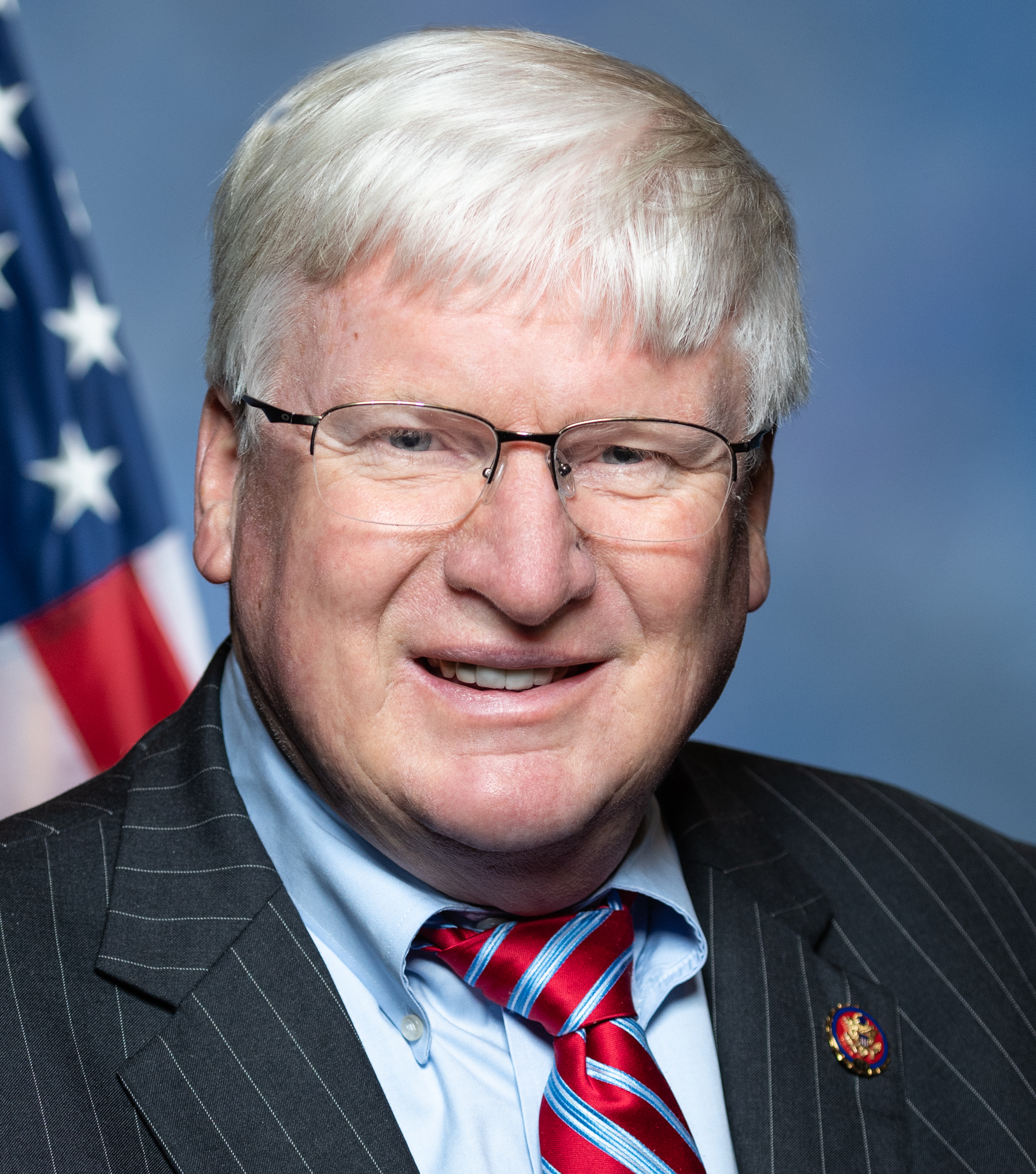
Nominee	Glenn Grothman
Party	Republican
Popular vote	239,231
Percentage	94.9%
- Grothman: 70–80% 80–90% >90% No votes
U.S. Representative before election
Glenn Grothman
Republican
Elected U.S. Representative
Glenn Grothman
Republican

The 6th district is based in east-central Wisconsin, encompassing part of the Fox River Valley, and takes in Fond du Lac, Oshkosh, and Sheboygan. The incumbent was Republican Glenn Grothman, who was reelected with 59.2% of the vote in 2020.

=== Republican primary ===
==== Candidates ====
===== Nominee =====
- Glenn Grothman, incumbent U.S. representative

===== Eliminated in primary =====
- Douglas Mullenix, management consultant

==== Primary results ====
Republican primary results
Party	Candidate	Votes	%
Republican	Glenn Grothman (incumbent)	84,056	82.5
Republican	Douglas Mullenix	17,773	17.4
Write-in		82	0.1
Total votes		101,911	100.0

=== Democratic primary ===
==== Candidates ====
===== Failed to qualify =====
- Amy Washburn, attorney

=== General election ===
==== Predictions ====
Source	Ranking	As of
The Cook Political Report	Solid R	March 8, 2022
Inside Elections	Solid R	March 15, 2022
Sabato's Crystal Ball	Safe R	March 9, 2022
Politico	Solid R	April 5, 2022
RCP	Safe R	June 9, 2022
Fox News	Solid R	July 11, 2022
DDHQ	Solid R	July 20, 2022
538	Solid R	June 30, 2022
The Economist	Safe R	September 28, 2022

==== Results ====
Wisconsin's 6th congressional district, 2022
Party	Candidate	Votes	%
Republican	Glenn Grothman (incumbent)	239,231	94.9
Write-in		12,768	5.1
Total votes		251,999	100.0
Republican hold			

== District 7 ==
2022 Wisconsin's 7th congressional district election
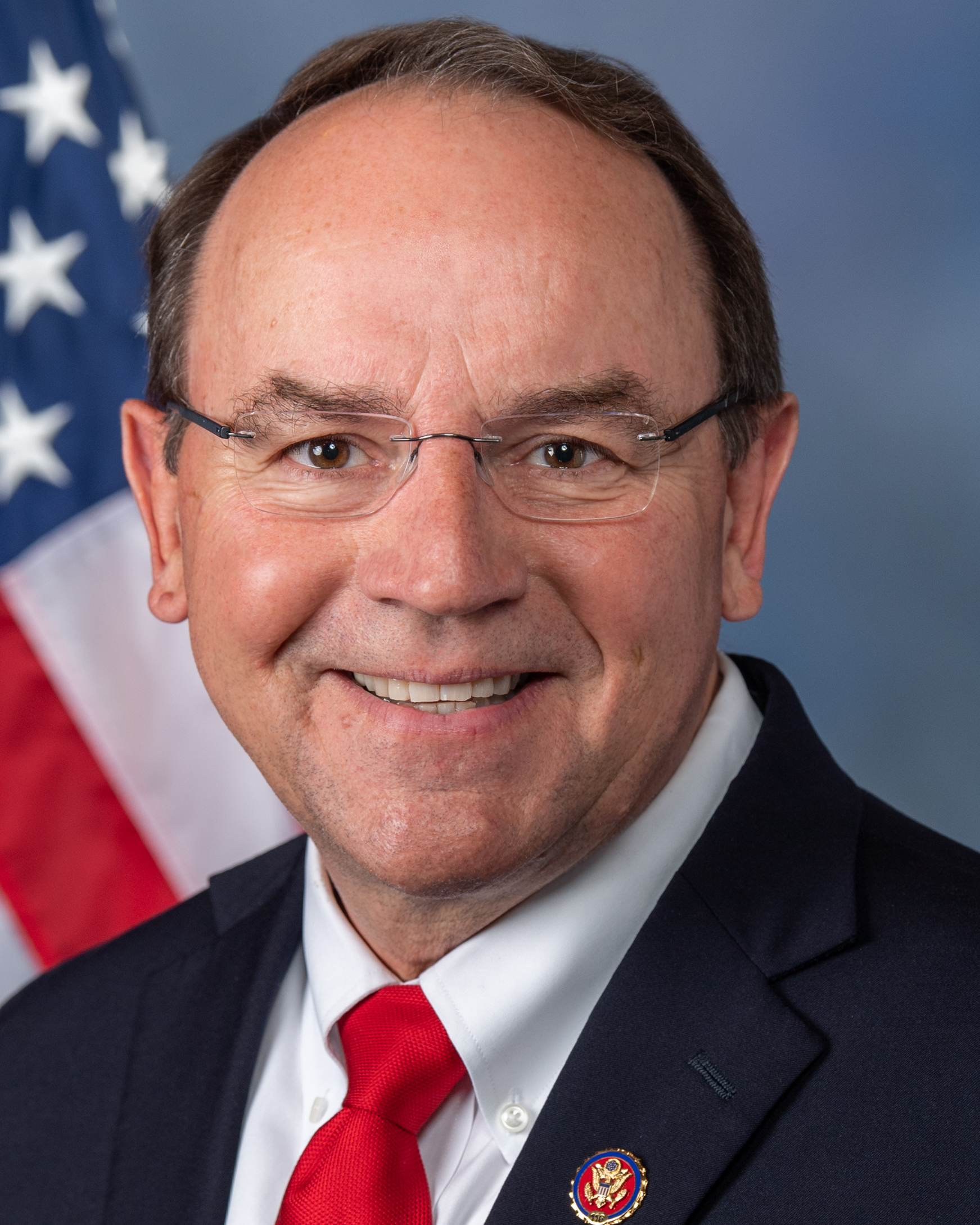

Nominee	Tom Tiffany	Richard Ausman
Party	Republican	Democratic
Popular vote	209,224	128,877
Percentage	61.9%	38.1%
- Tiffany: 50–60% 60–70% 70–80% 80–90% >90% Ausman: 50–60% 60–70% 70–80% 80–90% >90% Tie: 50% No votes
U.S. Representative before election
Tom Tiffany
Republican
Elected U.S. Representative
Tom Tiffany
Republican

The 7th district is located in northwestern Wisconsin and includes Wausau and Superior. The incumbent was Republican Tom Tiffany, who was reelected with 60.7% of the vote in 2020.

=== Republican primary ===
==== Candidates ====
===== Nominee =====
- Tom Tiffany, incumbent U.S. representative

===== Eliminated in primary =====
- David Kunelius, teacher

==== Primary results ====
Republican primary results
Party	Candidate	Votes	%
Republican	Tom Tiffany (incumbent)	80,675	86.6
Republican	David Kunelius	12,456	13.4
Write-in		52	0.0
Total votes		93,183	100.0

=== Democratic primary ===
==== Candidates ====
===== Nominee =====
- Richard Ausman, businessman

==== Primary results ====
Democratic primary results
Party	Candidate	Votes	%
Democratic	Richard Ausman	43,265	99.8
Write-in		67	0.2
Total votes		43,332	100.0

=== General election ===
==== Predictions ====
Source	Ranking	As of
The Cook Political Report	Solid R	March 8, 2022
Inside Elections	Solid R	March 15, 2022
Sabato's Crystal Ball	Safe R	March 9, 2022
Politico	Solid R	April 5, 2022
RCP	Safe R	June 9, 2022
Fox News	Solid R	July 11, 2022
DDHQ	Solid R	July 20, 2022
538	Solid R	June 30, 2022
The Economist	Safe R	September 28, 2022

==== Results ====
Wisconsin's 7th congressional district, 2022
Party	Candidate	Votes	%
Republican	Tom Tiffany (incumbent)	209,224	61.8
Democratic	Richard Ausman	128,877	38.1
Write-in		167	0.1
Total votes		338,268	100.0
Republican hold			

== District 8 ==
2022 Wisconsin's 8th congressional district election
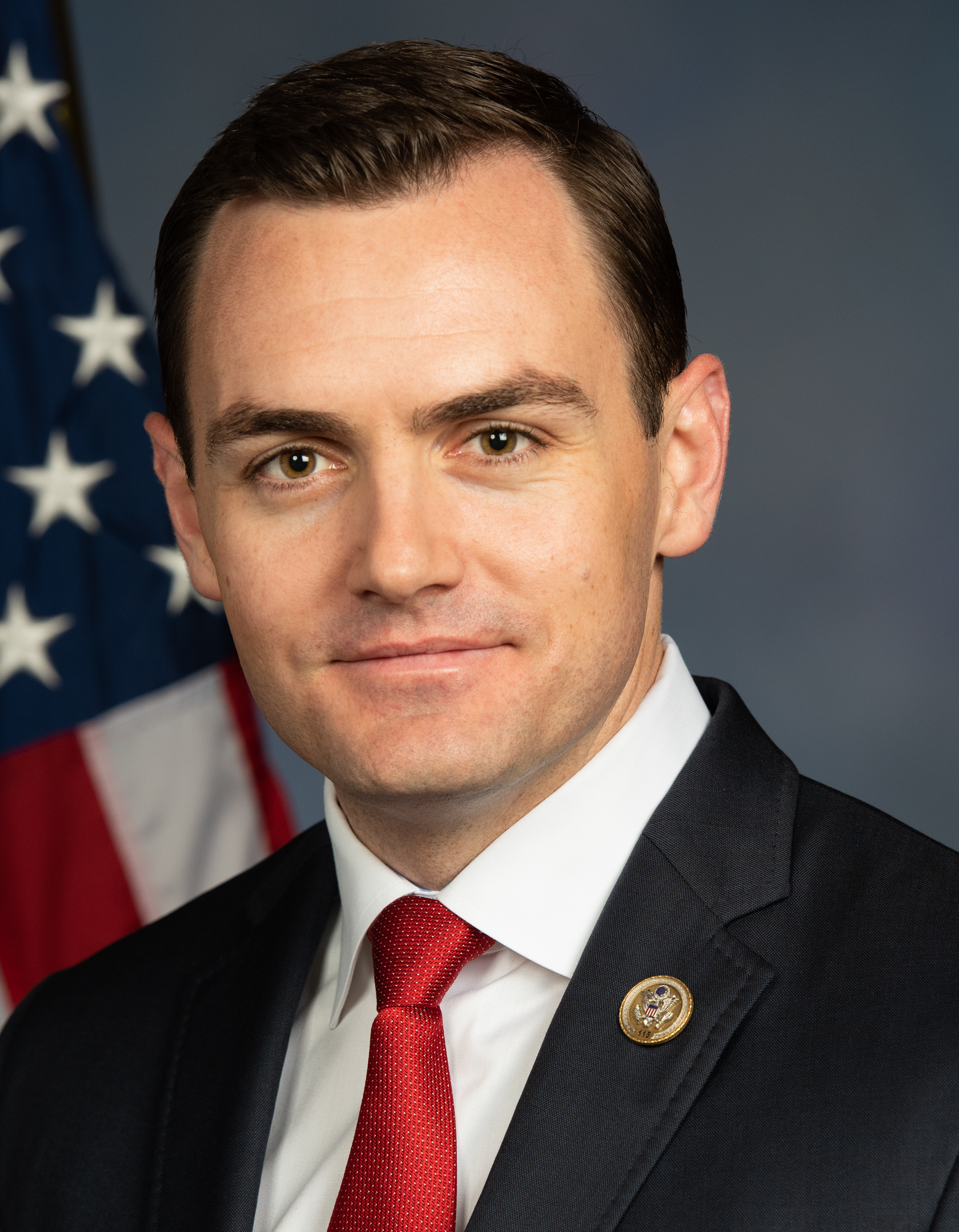

Nominee	Mike Gallagher	Paul Boucher	Jacob VandenPlas
Party	Republican	Independent	Libertarian
Popular vote	223,981	48,896	32,057
Percentage	72.21%	15.76%	10.33%
- Gallagher: 40–50% 50–60% 60–70% 70–80% 80–90% >90% Boucher: 40–50% VandenPlas: 30–40% No votes
U.S. Representative before election
Mike Gallagher
Republican
Elected U.S. Representative
Mike Gallagher
Republican

The 8th district encompasses northeastern Wisconsin, including Green Bay and Appleton. The incumbent was Republican Mike Gallagher, who was reelected with 64.2% of the vote in 2020.

=== Republican primary ===
==== Candidates ====
===== Nominee =====
- Mike Gallagher, incumbent U.S. representative

===== Eliminated in primary =====
- Shaun Clarmont

==== Endorsements ====
Mike Gallagher

U.S. executive branch officials

- Mike Pompeo, former United States Secretary of State (2018-2021)

Organizations

- New Politics

==== Primary results ====
Republican primary results
Party	Candidate	Votes	%
Republican	Mike Gallagher (incumbent)	79,096	84.6
Republican	Shaun Clarmont	14,377	15.4
Write-in		76	0.0
Total votes		93,459	100.0

=== Democratic primary ===
==== Candidates ====
===== Failed to qualify =====
- Rahb Kettleson, truck driver

=== Libertarian primary ===
==== Nominee ====
- Jacob VandenPlas, farmer

=== Independents ===
==== Declared ====
- Paul Boucher

=== General election ===
==== Predictions ====
Source	Ranking	As of
The Cook Political Report	Solid R	March 8, 2022
Inside Elections	Solid R	March 15, 2022
Sabato's Crystal Ball	Safe R	March 9, 2022
Politico	Solid R	April 5, 2022
RCP	Safe R	June 9, 2022
Fox News	Solid R	July 11, 2022
DDHQ	Solid R	July 20, 2022
538	Solid R	June 30, 2022
The Economist	Safe R	September 28, 2022

==== Results ====
Wisconsin's 8th congressional district, 2022
Party	Candidate	Votes	%
Republican	Mike Gallagher (incumbent)	223,981	72.2
Independent	Paul Boucher	48,896	15.8
Libertarian	Jacob VandenPlas	32,057	10.3
Write-in		5,262	1.7
Total votes		310,196	100.0
Republican hold			

== Notes ==
Partisan clients
