= Derrick Van Orden =

American politician (born 1969)

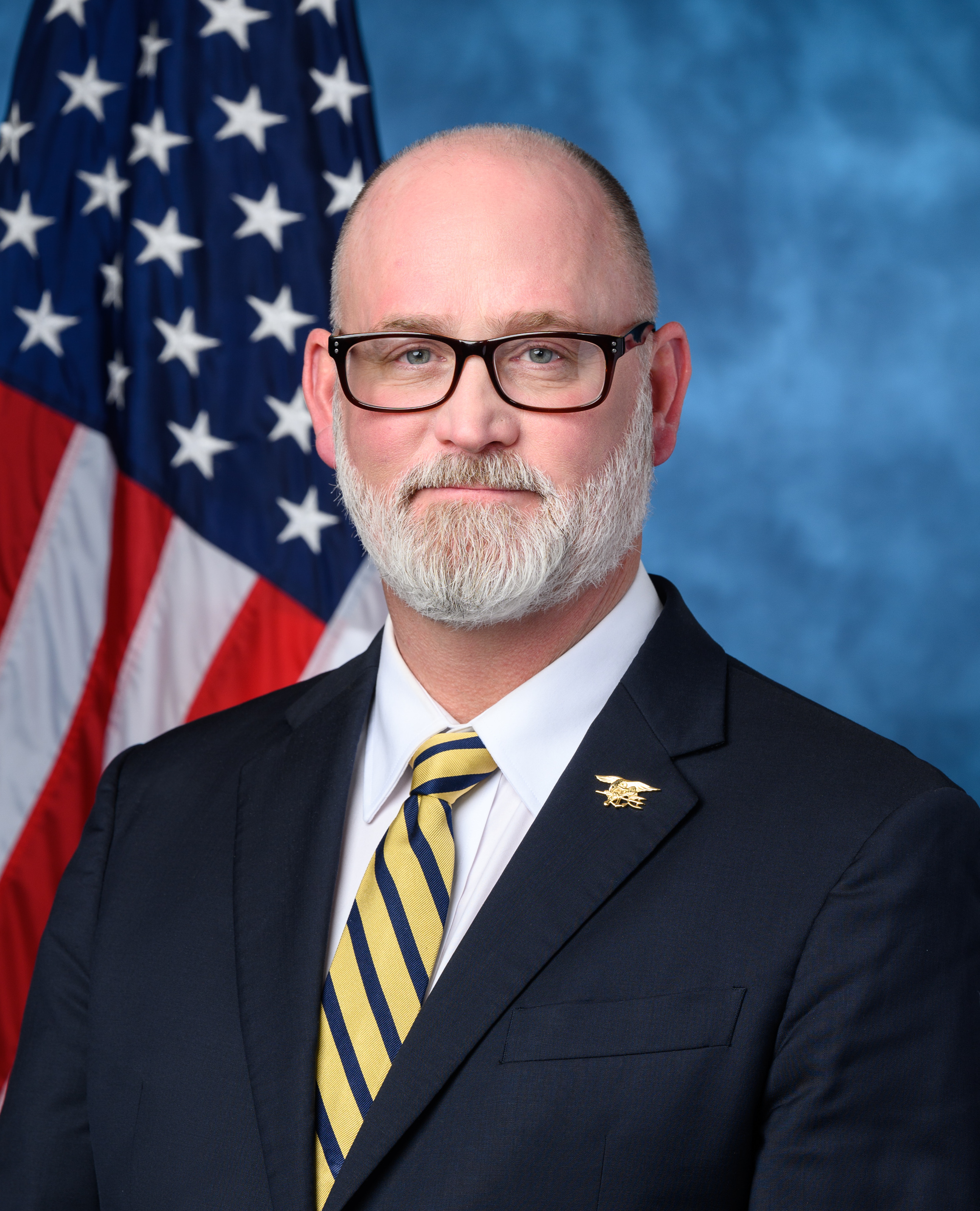
- Official portrait, 2022

Member of the U.S. House of Representatives from Wisconsin's 3rd district
- Incumbent
- Assumed office January 3, 2023
- Preceded by: Ron Kind

Personal details
- Born: Derrick Francis Van Orden; September 15, 1969 (age 57) Hennepin County, Minnesota, U.S.
- Party: Republican
- Spouse: Sara Jane Whitelock (m. 1995)
- Children: 4 (1 deceased)
- Education: Excelsior University (BS)
- Website: House website Campaign website

Military service
- Allegiance: United States
- Branch/service: United States Navy
- Years of service: 1988–2014
- Rank: Senior Chief Petty Officer
- Unit: United States Navy SEALs
- Van Orden's voice Van Orden on civility in political discourse Recorded May 21, 2025

Derrick Francis Van Orden (born September 15, 1969) is an American politician, actor, and retired United States Navy SEAL who has served as the U.S. representative for Wisconsin's 3rd congressional district since 2023. A member of the Republican Party, Van Orden was defeated in his 2026 re-election bid by Democratic challenger Rebecca Cooke.

== Early life, education, and military service ==
Van Orden was born in Minnesota on September 15, 1969. His family lived in Hartland, Wis. and then moved to the Portland, Ore. area where his mother accepted a job with the Insurance Company of North America. As a youth, Van Orden lived in Lake Oswego, Ore., attending Lakeridge High School. He holds a Bachelor of Science degree from Excelsior University.

Van Orden joined the United States Navy in 1988 and was assigned to SEAL Team FOUR at Naval Amphibious Base Little Creek, Virginia. Van Orden served five combat deployments and retired as a Senior Chief in 2014. Van Orden's 26 years of active duty military service make him the longest serving enlisted member of the military in the history of Congress.

== Post-military career ==
Van Orden played the role of Senior Chief Otto Miller in the 2012 film Act of Valor. He also had roles in the 2018 film Surviving the Wild and Running with the Devil (2019).

From 2017 to early 2019, Van Orden and his wife operated the Butternut Café in Butternut, Wisconsin.

Van Orden attended the January 6 "Stop the Steal" rally and was present at the United States Capitol during the January 6 United States Capitol attack.

On June 17, 2021, Van Orden confronted a teenage library page at Prairie du Chien Memorial Library about a display of books with LGBT themes assembled for Pride Month. Van Orden was particularly upset by A Day in the Life of Marlon Bundo, a fictional book about the same-sex romance of Marlon Bundo, the real-life pet rabbit of former Vice President Mike Pence. Van Orden submitted a written complaint to the library stating that the book was "skewing young people to think that Republicans are not inclusive. This book is not informational, it is propaganda". A staff member said that Van Orden was "aggressively shoving the books around", was shouting, and wanted to know who had established the display so he could "teach them a lesson".

== U.S. House of Representatives ==
=== Elections ===
==== 2020 ====
Wisconsin's 3rd congressional district results by county, 2020 general election

Van Orden was the Republican nominee for Wisconsin's 3rd congressional district, losing to incumbent Democrat Ron Kind by a margin of about three percentage points.

President Donald Trump endorsed Van Orden's 2020 campaign.

==== 2022 ====
Wisconsin's 3rd congressional district results by county, 2022 general election

Van Orden was once again the Republican nominee for Wisconsin's 3rd congressional district. The seat was open following incumbent Democrat Ron Kind's decision not to run for re-election. Van Orden focused his 2022 campaign on his military service and the economy. Former President Donald Trump endorsed Van Orden's 2022 campaign.

Van Orden defeated Democratic state senator Brad Pfaff in the general election.

==== 2024 ====
Van Orden was re-elected to a second term, with 51.4% of the vote and defeating Democratic nominee Rebecca Cooke.

==== 2026 ====
In 2026, Van Orden again faced Democratic nominee Rebecca Cooke for Wisconsin's 3rd congressional district. In August 2026, Van Orden drew criticism for posting AI-generated videos depicting Cooke making statements she had not made. Cooke won the election with 52.4% of the vote.

=== Tenure ===
Van Orden serves on the House Committee on Agriculture, the House Armed Services Committee, and the House Committee on Veterans' Affairs.

Van Orden was giving a Capitol tour on the evening of July 26, 2023, when he happened upon Senate pages lying on the floor of the United States Capitol rotunda taking photos of the interior of the Capitol dome (this is a traditional activity for the pages during their final week of service). Van Orden allegedly swore at the pages and told them to get off the floor. Van Orden's behavior was condemned by his fellow Republicans, including Senate Republican leader Mitch McConnell and Senator Thom Tillis, who said, "This is inexcusable and embarrassing behavior for a member of Congress or any adult for that matter. The Congressman should do the right thing and apologize."

Van Orden had an outburst during a White House briefing on the Gaza war.

During President Joe Biden's 2024 State of the Union address, Van Orden shouted "lies" after Biden criticized Donald Trump over Trump's handling of the COVID-19 pandemic.

In February 2025, Van Orden filed a resolution to impeach U.S. District Judge Paul Engelmayer after the judge blocked Elon Musk's team from accessing sensitive U.S. Treasury Department payment systems. The following month, Musk contributed the maximum allowable donation to Van Orden and other Republicans who supported the impeachment of federal judges who had ruled against the Trump administration.

Following the shootings of Minnesota legislators in June, Van Orden falsely linked the perpetrator to the anti-Trump No Kings protests, writing "Yesterday, a whole pack of election deniers got together and spewed hate. One of them decided to murder and attempt to murder some politicians that were not far Left enough for them." Van Orden responded to Minnesota Governor Tim Walz's statements mourning the shootings in posts calling Walz "stupid" and a "clown." He replied to criticism of his comments from fellow Wisconsin representative Mark Pocan, telling Pocan "It is statistically impossible that you could be dumb enough to believe what you are writing."

Van Orden voted in favor of the One Big Beautiful Bill Act. Van Orden celebrated passage of the Act by posting "YES!" on X in response to a post critical of the bill which stated "17 million people just lost health care. 18 million kids just lost school meals. 3 million Americans just lost food assistance. And $3.5 trillion was added to the deficit. All for a tax cut for Trump's billionaire donors." Van Orden later deleted the post. After voting to pass the One Big Beautiful Bill Act, Van Orden commented that he and other Republicans were "not a bunch of little bitches" for falling in line with President Trump's policies and self-imposed deadline.

In August 2026, Van Orden introduced legislation to overturn a Washington, D.C. law requiring all motorcyclists to wear helmets. He stated that he aims to repeal all helmet laws in the country.

Van Orden has posted several Islamophobic comments on X. Van Orden has claimed that "there are radical Muslim sleeper cells here in America murdering American citizens. It is also indisputable that there are people here in America that are being radicalized currently by foolish democrat politician’s hate America rhetoric." He has also promoted unsubstantiated statistics about the prevalence of Muslim grooming gangs, and said that countries with significant Muslim populations have “committed cultural suicide.” Van Orden called for the deportation of Muslim journalist Mehdi Hasan, a naturalized American citizen. Van Orden said it was "absolutely unacceptable" that nearly half of the doctors in a Texas residency program were Pakistani. Van Orden also endorsed the hoax that Haitian immigrants were eating household pets.

Following his 2026 election loss to Democrat Rebecca Cooke, Van Orden criticized her on social media for taking a picture while lying on the floor of the Rotunda during freshman orientation, claiming that she "disgraces the memory of the wounded Union Soldiers that died on this floor during the Civil War".

=== Committee assignments ===
- Committee on Veterans' Affairs
  - Economic Opportunity Subcommittee, Chairman
- Committee on Agriculture
  - Nutrition, Foreign Agriculture, and Horticulture Subcommittee
- Armed Services
  - Strategic Forces
  - Intelligence and Special Operations

=== Caucus memberships ===
- Congressional Border Security Caucus
- Congressional Career and Technical Education Caucus
- Congressional Biofuels Caucus
- Congressional Bipartisan Wildfire Caucus
- Congressional Pediatric and Adult Hydrocephalus Caucus
- Congressional Motorcycle Caucus Co-Chair

== Personal life ==
Van Orden and his wife, Sara Jane, live in Wisconsin. They have four children and eleven grandchildren. He is a Protestant. In August 2023, Van Orden's oldest daughter, Sydney Marie Martenis, died of cancer.

On August 27, 2021, Van Orden was cited at the Eastern Iowa Airport for having a loaded handgun in his bag at the security checkpoint. Van Orden called the incident "a mistake"; he paid a fine, completed a gun safety program, and was placed on one year's probation.

== Electoral history ==
=== U.S. House of Representatives (2020–present) ===
Year	Election	Date	Elected				Defeated				Total	Plurality
2020	Primary	Aug. 11	Derrick Van Orden	Republican	36,395	65.87%	Jessi Ebben	Rep.	18,835	34.09%	55,251	17,560
2020	General	Nov. 3	Ron Kind (inc)	Democratic	199,870	51.30%	Derrick Van Orden	Rep.	189,524	48.64%	389,618	10,346
2022	General	Nov. 8	Derrick Van Orden	Republican	164,743	51.82%	Brad Pfaff	Dem.	152,977	48.12%	317,922	11,766
2024	General	Nov. 5	Derrick Van Orden (inc)	Republican	212,064	51.32%	Rebecca Cooke	Dem.	200,808	48.60%	413,181	11,256

== Publications ==
=== Books ===
- A Book of Man: A Navy SEAL's Guide to the Lost Art of Manhood, 2015. (ISBN 9780692427378).

== See also ==
- List of United States Navy SEALs

U.S. House of Representatives
Preceded by Ron Kind	Member of the U.S. House of Representatives from Wisconsin's 3rd congressional district 2023–present	Incumbent
U.S. order of precedence (ceremonial)
Preceded by Jill Tokuda	United States representatives by seniority 353rd	Succeeded by Gabe Vasquez
