= Rebecca Cooke =

American politician (born 1987)

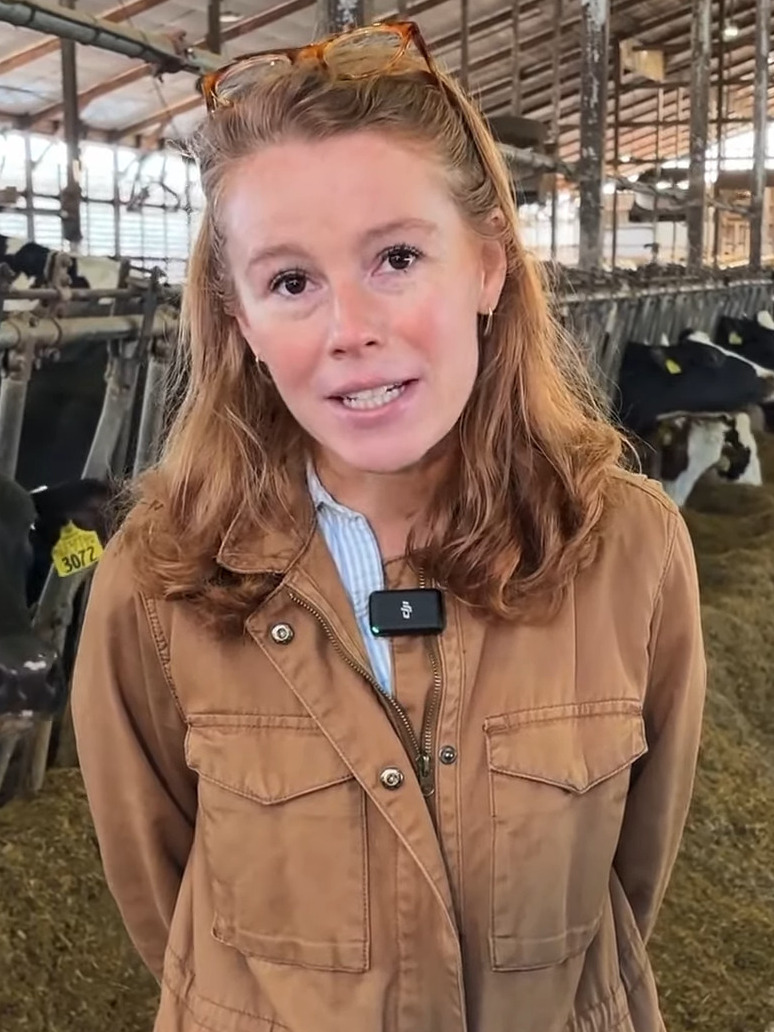
- Cooke in 2025

Member-elect of the U.S. House of Representatives from Wisconsin's 3rd district
- Assuming office January 3, 2027
- Succeeding: Derrick Van Orden

Personal details
- Born: December 21, 1987 (age 38) Eau Claire, Wisconsin, U.S.
- Party: Democratic
- Relatives: Chauncey H. Cooke (ancestor)
- Education: University of St. Thomas (BA)
- Website: Campaign website
- Cooke's voice Cooke discussing tariffs imposed by the Trump administration Recorded May 31, 2025

Rebecca Cooke (born December 21, 1987) is an American politician, nonprofit founder, and former political consultant who is the U.S. representative-elect for Wisconsin's 3rd congressional district. A member of the Democratic Party, Cooke defeated Republican incumbent Derrick Van Orden in 2026 after unsuccessfully running for the seat in the 2022 primary and the 2024 general election. From 2019 to 2021, Cooke served on the board of the Wisconsin Economic Development Corporation.

== Early life and education ==
Rebecca Cooke was born on December 21, 1987, in Eau Claire, Wisconsin, the youngest of three children in a dairy farming family. She is a descendant of abolitionist Chauncey Cooke.

Cooke attended 4-H youth programs as a child, and was the president of her local 4-H club. She began waitressing at 16 while attending North High School. After graduating, Cooke earned a Bachelor of Arts degree from the University of St. Thomas.

== Career ==
After college, Cooke worked as a fundraiser for national campaigns. From 2012 to 2014, she served as finance director for four congressional campaigns in four U.S. states. In 2014, she moved back to Eau Claire, where she opened a home goods store, Red's Mercantile, and began to work as a political consultant. Between 2015 and 2021, Cooke's consulting firm advised eight political campaigns.

In 2016, Cooke founded the Red Letter Grant, a nonprofit organization that financially supports women-owned businesses. In 2019, Wisconsin governor Tony Evers appointed her to the Wisconsin Economic Development Corporation's board of directors, where she co-chaired the Entrepreneurship & Innovation Committee and later served as board secretary. Cooke resigned from the board in November 2021. In 2022, she closed her home goods store. Until 2025, Cooke ran a consulting company advising small businesses.

== Congressional campaigns ==
=== 2022 ===
Cooke sought to represent Wisconsin's 3rd congressional district in 2022, coming second in the Democratic primary to state senator Brad Pfaff. Running as a Blue Dog Democrat, Cooke campaigned on improving the economy, lowering healthcare costs, and investing in infrastructure. She lost by seven points in what was called an underdog campaign. She performed best in the district's rural areas.

=== 2024 ===
Cooke ran to represent the 3rd congressional district again while continuing to work three nights a week as a waitress. She campaigned as a moderate Democrat, and pledged to join the centrist Blue Dog Coalition if elected, though she emphasized her support for abortion rights and healthcare reform. Mother Jones called Cooke's campaign style "a moderate version of Democratic populism".

The incumbent, Derrick Van Orden, defeated Cooke in the general election by less than three points. She outperformed Kamala Harris in the concurrently held presidential election.

Cooke campaigning with Senator Tammy Baldwin in 2026

=== 2026 ===
Cooke was the Democratic nominee in the 2026 election for the 3rd congressional district. Considered the front-runner in the Democratic primary, she received "a wide range of Democratic endorsements from progressives and moderates", earning the support of Bernie Sanders as well as the New Democrat Coalition and the Blue Dog Caucus.

Before the August 11 Democratic primary, Cooke said she would not run for the seat again if she did not win. After she won the nomination, the libertarian magazine Reason called her "a straight shooter in a district that probably needs that type of candidate". Cooke defeated Van Orden by about seven percentage points in the November 3 general election.

== Political views ==
Cooke identifies as a centrist, and has confirmed she will join the Blue Dog Caucus in the 120th Congress. She told Politico she does "not identify as a progressive". Cooke has criticized the national Democratic Party's public image, calling its branding "far left" and out of touch with most Americans. She has called congressional Democrats "too far left" and congressional Republicans "too far right".

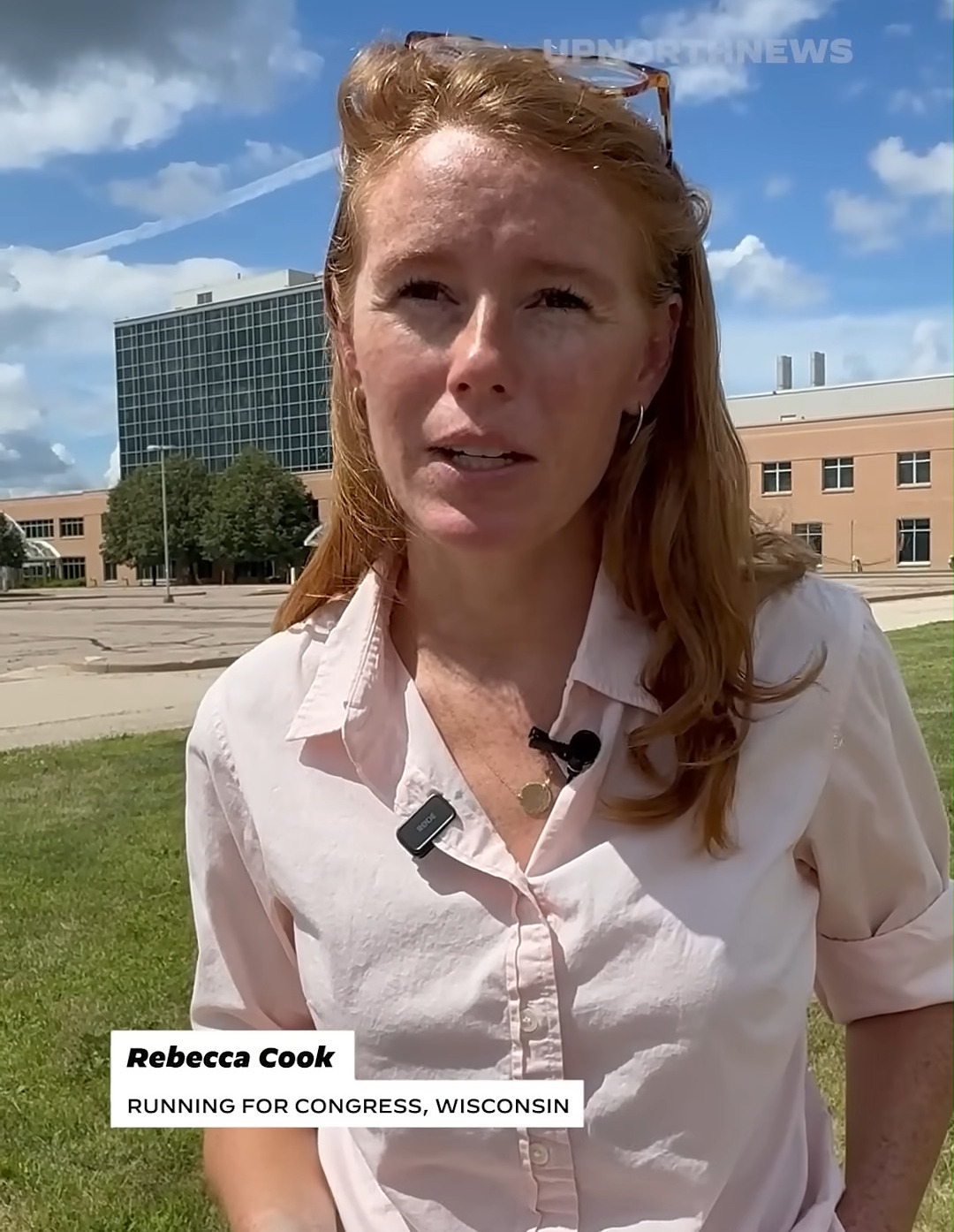
Cooke being interviewed by UpNorthNews in August 2025

Cooke has received support from the liberal Zionist organization J Street. She supports Israel's right to self-defense as well as the halting of U.S. military aid to Israel, citing "deep concerns about the humanitarian toll of the war in Gaza".

Cooke has opposed calls to defund the police and abolish ICE. She supports universal background checks and stronger enforcement of red flag laws. Cooke is pro-choice and has called abortion a decision that should be "free from political or governmental interference".

Cooke opposes Medicare for All, instead supporting the expansion of Medicare to cover dental, hearing, and vision. She has backed stronger antitrust laws, and supports increasing the minimum wage to $15.

Cooke supported the 2026 United States intervention in Venezuela and the ouster of President Nicolás Maduro, but criticized the Trump administration's lack of a "concrete plan for stability" in the country. She has opposed foreign ownership of American farmland, and criticized tariffs imposed by the Trump administration for causing family farm bankruptcies.

== Personal life ==
Cooke lives on Tainter Lake in Colfax, Wisconsin. She is a personal friend of U.S. representative Marie Gluesenkamp Perez, the co-chair of the Blue Dog Coalition. Cooke is Protestant. Until 2025, she had a fellowship with the centrist think tank Third Way.

== Electoral history ==
=== 2022 ===
2022 Wisconsin's 3rd congressional district Democratic primary election
Party	Candidate	Votes	%
Democratic	Brad Pfaff	24,041	38.95
Democratic	Rebecca Cooke	19,221	31.14
Democratic	Deb Baldus McGrath	11,770	19.07
Democratic	Mark Neumann	6,672	10.81
	Scattering	25	0.04
Total votes		61,729	100.00

=== 2024 ===
2024 Wisconsin's 3rd congressional district election
Primary election
Party	Candidate	Votes	%
Democratic	Rebecca Cooke	42,316	50.51
Democratic	Katrina Shankland	34,812	41.55
Democratic	Eric Wilson	6,624	7.91
	Scattering	24	0.03
Total votes		83,776	100.00
General election
Republican	Derrick Van Orden	212,064	51.32
Democratic	Rebecca Cooke	200,808	48.60
	Scattering	309	0.08
Total votes		413,181	100.00

=== 2026 ===
2026 Wisconsin's 3rd congressional district election
Primary election
Party	Candidate	Votes	%
Democratic	Rebecca Cooke	56,650	60.48
Democratic	Emily Berge	36,958	39.45
	Scattering	65	0.07
Total votes		93,673	100.00
General election
Democratic	Rebecca Cooke	172,757	52.44
Republican	Derrick Van Orden	150,872	45.79
Independent	Alexander Kent	4,035	1.22
Independent	Rustin Provance	1,799	0.55
Total votes		329,463 (Note: Unofficial results with 99% of votes counted.)	100.00

== Notes ==
U.S. House of Representatives
Preceded by Derrick Van Orden	Member of the U.S. House of Representatives from Wisconsin's 3rd congressional district Taking office 2027	Elect
