= Rockwell J. Flint =

19th century American politician

- Flint, c. 1925

United States Marshall for the Western District of Wisconsin
- In office February 1908 – September 1, 1916
- President: Theodore Roosevelt; William Howard Taft; Woodrow Wilson
- Preceded by: Charles Lewiston
- Succeeded by: Frank O'Connor

Member of the Wisconsin Senate from the 30th district
- In office January 2, 1882 – January 5, 1885
- Preceded by: Michael Griffin
- Succeeded by: George Clay Ginty
- In office January 3, 1876 – January 7, 1878
- Preceded by: Hiram P. Graham
- Succeeded by: Abraham D. Andrews

Member of the Wisconsin State Assembly from the Dunn–Pepin district
- In office January 4, 1875 – January 3, 1876
- Preceded by: Samuel L. Plummer
- Succeeded by: Menzus R. Bump

Personal details
- Born: Rockwell Joseph Flint; March 23, 1842 Williamstown, Vermont, U.S.
- Died: June 23, 1933 (aged 91) Menomonie, Wisconsin, U.S.
- Resting place: Evergreen Cemetery, Menomonie, Wisconsin
- Party: Republican
- Occupation: Politician, newspaper editor

Military service
- Allegiance: United States
- Branch/service: United States Volunteers; Union Army
- Years of service: 1862–1865
- Rank: Quartermaster sergeant
- Unit: 23rd Reg. Wis. Vol. Infantry
- Battles/wars: American Civil War

Rockwell Joseph Flint (March 23, 1842 – June 23, 1933) was an American newspaper editor and Republican politician. He served in the Wisconsin State Senate and Assembly, representing Dunn and Pepin counties. He served as a quartermaster in the Union Army during the American Civil War and was appointed U.S. marshall for the Western District of Wisconsin by President Theodore Roosevelt.

== Biography ==
Born in Williamstown, Orange County, Vermont, Flint moved to Wisconsin in 1855 and settled in Marquette County. In 1860, he moved to Portage and learned the printer's trade at The State Register newspaper. During the Civil War, Flint served in the 23rd Wisconsin Infantry Regiment and was a quartermaster sergeant in the United States Signal Corps. Flint moved to Menomonie, Dunn County, Wisconsin in 1871. Flint was the editor and publisher of the Dunn County News. He also published the Prescott Journal. From 1878 to 1880, Flint served as chairman of the Menomonie Town Board. In 1894 and 1895, Flint served as mayor of Menomonie and was on the Dunn County Board of Supervisors. In 1875, Flint served in the Wisconsin State Assembly as a Republican. Flint later served in the Wisconsin State Senate, being elected in 1876, 1877, 1882, and 1883. From 1908 to 1916, Flint served as United States marshal for the Western District of Wisconsin. Flint died at his home in Menomonie, Wisconsin, in 1933.
