= William H. Joslin =

American politician

William H. Joslin was a member of the Wisconsin State Assembly.

== Biography ==
Joslin was born on September 25, 1829, in Ypsilanti, Michigan. On October 24, 1852, he married Margaret M. Gillam. They would have seven children. Joslin died on September 2, 1926, in Richland Center, Wisconsin.

The Joslin Monument in Richland Center is dedicated to his brother, James Wallace Joslin.

== Political career ==
Joslin was a member of the Assembly during the 1880 session. Other positions he held include Sheriff of Richland County, Wisconsin, in 1859 and 1860, along with county treasurer in 1869, 1870, 1871 and 1872. He was a Republican.

== Military career ==
During the American Civil War, Joslin served with the 25th Wisconsin Volunteer Infantry Regiment of the Union Army. Battles he participated in include the Battle of Resaca, the Battle of Dallas, the Battle of Kennesaw Mountain, the Battle of Atlanta, the Battle of Decatur, the Battle of Rivers' Bridge and the Battle of Bentonville. Additionally, Joslin took part in the Meridian Expedition and Sherman's March to the Sea. He was brevetted a colonel.
