= Chauncey H. Cooke =

American politician

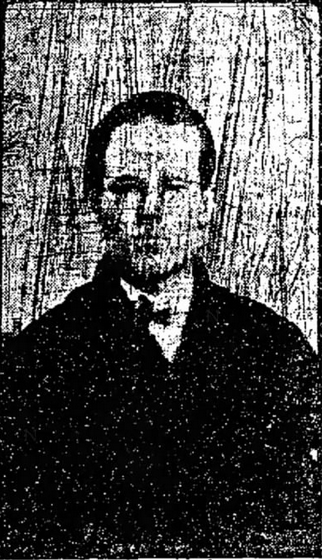
- Born: Chauncey Hibbard Cooke; May 15, 1846; Columbus, Ohio, U.S.
- Died: May 11, 1919 (aged 72); Mondovi, Wisconsin, U.S.
- Burial place: Cooke Cemetery, Lookout, Wisconsin
- Spouse: Sarah Eliza Caves (m. 1882)
- Relatives: Rebecca Cooke
- Military career
- Allegiance: United States
- Branch: United States Volunteers; Union Army
- Service years: August 1862 – May 15, 1865
- Rank: Private
- Unit: 25th Reg. Wis. Vol. Infantry
- Conflicts: Indian Wars (1862); American Civil War (1862–1865)
- Other work: Freedmen's schoolteacher, farmer, Buffalo County commission member, Grand Army of the Republic commander

Chauncey Hibbard Cooke (May 15, 1846 – May 11, 1919) was an American farmer, educator, abolitionist activist, and Wisconsin pioneer. With his parents, he was among the earliest American settlers in Buffalo County, Wisconsin. He served in the Union Army through most of the American Civil War. After the war, he went on to serve with the Freedmen's Bureau, working to provide education for formerly enslaved people in Texas.

== Early life and education ==
Cooke was born in Columbus, Ohio, in May 1846; he had three brothers and a sister. He visited Winchester, Indiana, in 1856 and grew up in Buffalo County, Wisconsin. While growing up in Wisconsin, he lived amicably near Native Americans, and both he and his father had a favorable opinion of them.

== Career ==
=== American Civil War ===
In August 1862, Cooke joined the U.S. Army with the 25th Wisconsin Infantry Regiment. He was 16 years old and thus underage at the time, but this was not noticed by his superiors. He joined the U.S. Army as both he and his father were abolitionists who were opposed to slavery. Upon joining the army, Cooke's father reminded of him of why he was fighting for the United States, saying to him, "Don't forget that there are four million slaves whose hope of liberty is at stake in this war."

However, after he joined the army, his unit was sent to Minnesota to fight Sioux Native Americans. Cooke disliked this for two reasons, first as he had joined the army to fight against the Confederacy and its cause of slavery, and second because he had a favorable opinion of Native Americans and felt that they were being treated unfairly by the U.S. government. The unit's mission in Minnesota ended without major combat in November 1862, as the reason for its deployment had been resolved. The unit was then sent to Illinois and arrived there in February 1863. Afterwards, they then headed to Kentucky.

==== Contact with slaves ====
While in Kentucky, Cooke met with many slaves that had been freed by the Union Army, and was impressed by their demeanor. He was especially impressed by freed slaves he had met that were from Louisiana and could speak multiple languages. Meeting these slaves strengthened Cooke's dislike of slavery, as he felt that these slaves, some of whom were more intelligent than he was, should not be enslaved.

Cooke stated that his primary reason for fighting for the U.S. in the war was to free the slaves, stating that "I have no heart in this war if the slaves cannot go free."

==== Contact with Confederates ====
During the war, Cooke came across Confederate prisoners that had been captured by the Union Army. He would often ask them why they were waging a war against the United States, to which they consistently replied that they were fighting against the U.S. so that the Confederacy's women would be prevented from marrying slaves, which the Confederates constantly referred to as "niggers". Disapproving of the Confederates' use of racist language and their staunchly pro-slavery views, Cooke referred to them as "Poor ignorant devils".

==== Discharge ====
Cooke fell ill and was discharged from the army on May 15, 1865. He was proud of his service in the U.S. Army and what U.S. victory in the war had achieved in ending slavery.

== Later life and death ==
After the war, Cooke returned to Buffalo County and in 1870 was living with his parents, three brothers, and a sister in his father's hotel in Alma, Wisconsin, the county seat of Buffalo County. Cooke attended Eau Claire Seminary, which became the University of Wisconsin–La Crosse. He then taught briefly as a teacher in Wisconsin. Cooke's commitment to helping the slaves did not end with the end of slavery, he lived for several years in Texas, teaching and educating former slaves. Afterwards, he returned to Buffalo County, Wisconsin and lived as a farmer there.

Cooke served as a member of the Buffalo County commission and was commander of his local Grand Army of the Republic. He worked, farming in Dover Township and farmed until a few years before his death.

Cooke died in May 1919. On the day of his funeral, the businesses in his town agreed to close for two hours. His gravestone lists him as a friend to African Americans and Native Americans alike and notes that he fought in the army to preserve the U.S. and free the slaves.

== Personal life ==
Cooke married Sarah Eliza Caves on September 27, 1882; she died in 1933. They had three sons, Samuel S. Cooke, Carl Hibbard Cooke and Rodney Cooke, who became an army lieutenant and died during World War I.

One of his descendants is Rebecca Cooke, a Democratic member-elect of the United States House of Representatives, nonprofit founder, and former member of Wisconsin Economic Development Corporation board.
