= Brad Pfaff =

21st century American politician

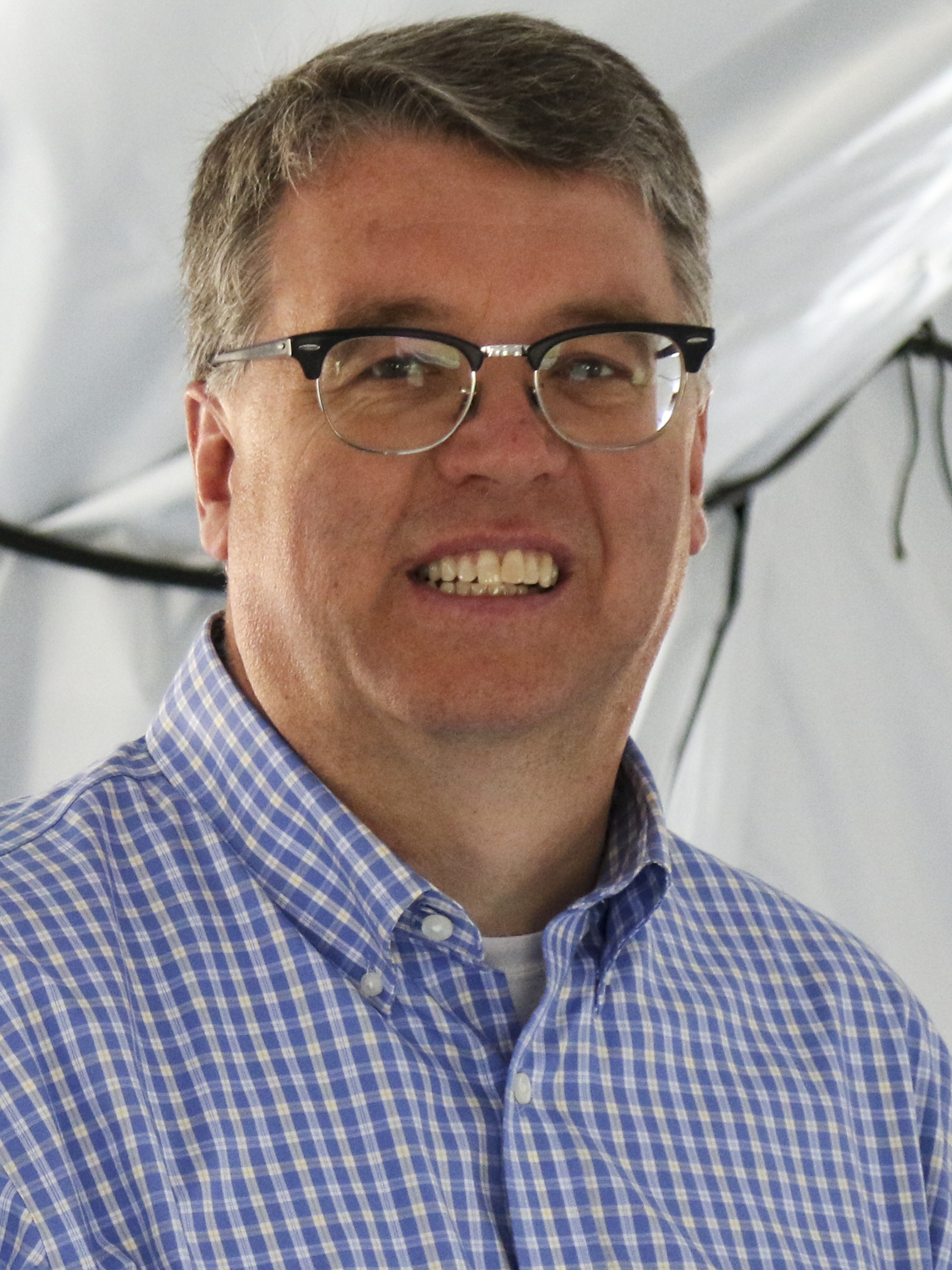

Member of the Wisconsin Senate from the 32nd district
- Incumbent
- Assumed office January 4, 2021
- Preceded by: Jennifer Shilling

Secretary of the Wisconsin Department of Agriculture, Trade and Consumer Protection
- Acting
- In office January 7, 2019 – November 5, 2019
- Governor: Tony Evers
- Preceded by: Sheila Harsdorf
- Succeeded by: Randall Romanski

Personal details
- Born: December 7, 1967 (age 58) La Crosse County, Wisconsin, U.S.
- Party: Democratic
- Spouse: Betty Lounsbrough (m. 1991)
- Children: 2
- Education: University of Wisconsin, Green Bay (BA); George Mason University (MPA)
- Website: Campaign website

Bradley M. Pfaff (born December 7, 1967) is an American agriculture policy administrator and Democratic politician from La Crosse County, Wisconsin. He is a member of the Wisconsin Senate, representing Wisconsin's 32nd Senate district since 2021. He was an unsuccessful candidate for United States House of Representatives in 2022.

He previously served as secretary-designee of the Wisconsin Department of Agriculture, Trade and Consumer Protection in 2019, during the first term of Governor Tony Evers, but his appointment was rejected by the Republican state Senate ten months into his term. Pfaff subsequently worked as director of business and rural development for the Wisconsin Department of Administration.

Earlier in his career, Pfaff served as a federal appointee in the Obama administration, working as the Wisconsin state executive director of the Farm Service Agency and deputy administrator for farm programs at the United States Department of Agriculture.

== Early life and education ==
Pfaff was born in La Crosse County, Wisconsin, and raised on his family's farm there. He earned his bachelor's degree in public and environmental administration from the University of Wisconsin–Green Bay and a Master of Public Administration from George Mason University.

== Career ==
Early in his career, Pfaff became involved in public service and politics, working as an aide to state representative Virgil Roberts. He then worked as a constituent outreach staffer for U.S. senator Herb Kohl. In 1996, he made his first run for political office, running for Wisconsin State Assembly in the 94th Assembly district. With his brother as campaign manager, he challenged incumbent Republican Michael Huebsch, who had defeated his former boss Virgil Roberts in the 1994 election. Pfaff received the Democratic Party nomination without opposition in the primary, but was defeated in the general election by about 2,000 votes.

After the 1996 election, Pfaff joined the staff of congressman Ron Kind in 1997, where he worked as a policy advisor on rural and agricultural issues for the next twelve years. At the time, he was also a member of the Southwest Badger Resource Conservation and Development Council.

In 2004, Pfaff made another run for office, running for Wisconsin Senate in the 32nd Senate district seat, which was vacated by Mark Meyer's appointment to the state Public Service Commission. Pfaff prevailed in the Democratic primary over Monte L. Jacobson, but was narrowly defeated in the general election by Republican Dan Kapanke.

He was subsequently elected to the La Crosse County board of supervisors in April 2006, and was re-elected in 2008. He resigned from the county board in 2009 after he received his federal appointment.

=== Obama administration ===
In 2009, Pfaff was appointed the Wisconsin executive director for the Farm Service Agency at the USDA. In 2015, Pfaff was appointed to serve as the USDA Deputy Administrator for Farm Programs, a position responsible for the implementation and delivery of all Title 1 crop commodity programs and the Conservation Reserve Program. After President Obama left office in 2017, Pfaff rejoined congressman Ron Kind's office as deputy chief of staff.

=== Evers administration ===
In December 2018, Governor-elect Tony Evers announced his nomination of Pfaff to serve as secretary of the Wisconsin Department of Agriculture, Trade and Consumer Protection. Pfaff began work in January 2019, but his appointment remained contingent on confirmation by the Wisconsin Senate. Eleven months later, in November 2019, the State Senate voted along party lines to reject Pfaff's appointment. Evers subsequently hired Pfaff as director of business and rural development in the Wisconsin Department of Administration.

=== State Senate ===
In 2020, Pfaff decided to make another run for Wisconsin Senate in the 32nd Senate district, following the announcement that incumbent Democratic senator Jennifer Shilling would not seek re-election. Shilling endorsed Pfaff in May 2020, and Pfaff defeated his opponents in the Democratic primary with 62% of the vote. He went on to win the 2020 general election, narrowly defeating Dan Kapanke in a rematch of their 2004 election. The 32nd Senate district—which comprises most of Pfaff's native La Crosse County, as well as most of Vernon County, part of Monroe County, and all of Crawford County—is one of the few competitive districts in the Wisconsin Senate. With the last two State Senate elections decided by fewer than 600 votes.

=== 2022 congressional election ===
After the announcement that 13-term incumbent congressman Ron Kind would retire in 2022, Pfaff declared his candidacy for United States House of Representatives to replace his former boss in Wisconsin's 3rd congressional district. Pfaff was narrowly defeated by Republican Derrick Van Orden in the 2022 general election.

== Personal life and family ==
Brad Pfaff is a son of Leon Pfaff, who served 20 years on the La Crosse County board of supervisors. Brad's younger brother, Shawn, served as an external relations manager on the staff of Governor Jim Doyle during his first term, and later served as mayor of Fitchburg, Wisconsin.

Brad met his wife, Betty (née Lounsbrough), in high school. They married in 1991, they now reside in Onalaska, Wisconsin, and have two adult children.

== Electoral history ==
=== Wisconsin Assembly (1996) ===
Year	Election	Date	Elected				Defeated				Total	Plurality
1996	General	Nov. 5	Michael Huebsch (inc)	Republican	12,648	53.15%	Brad Pfaff	Dem.	10,580	44.46%	23,797	2,068
1996	General	Nov. 5	Michael Huebsch (inc)	Republican	12,648	53.15%	Jim Milliren	Ind.	569	2.39%	23,797	2,068

=== Wisconsin Senate (2004) ===
Year	Election	Date	Elected				Defeated				Total	Plurality
2004	Primary	Sep. 14	Brad Pfaff	Democratic	8,637	79.13%	Monte L. Jacobson	Dem.	2,258	20.69%	10,915	6,379
2004	General	Nov. 3	Dan Kapanke	Republican	46,416	52.46%	Brad Pfaff	Dem.	41,928	47.39%	88,483	4,488

=== Wisconsin Senate (2020, 2024) ===
Year	Election	Date	Elected				Defeated				Total	Plurality
2020	Primary	Aug. 11	Brad Pfaff	Democratic	12,631	62.73%	Jayne Swiggum	Dem.	6,558	32.57%	20,134	6,073
2020	Primary	Aug. 11	Brad Pfaff	Democratic	12,631	62.73%	Paul Michael Weber	Dem.	934	4.64%	20,134	6,073
2020	General	Nov. 3	Brad Pfaff	Democratic	48,877	50.26%	Dan Kapanke	Rep.	48,295	49.67%	97,239	582
2024	General	Nov. 5	Brad Pfaff (inc)	Democratic	52,776	52.33%	Stacey Klein	Rep.	48,058	47.65%	100,857	4,718

=== U.S. House of Representatives (2022) ===
Year	Election	Date	Elected				Defeated				Total	Plurality
2022	Primary	Aug. 9	Brad Pfaff	Democratic	24,041	38.95%	Rebecca Cooke	Dem.	19,221	31.14%	61,729	4,820
2022	Primary	Aug. 9	Brad Pfaff	Democratic	24,041	38.95%	Deb Baldus McGrath	Dem.	11,770	19.07%	61,729	4,820
2022	Primary	Aug. 9	Brad Pfaff	Democratic	24,041	38.95%	Mark Neumann	Dem.	6,672	10.81%	61,729	4,820
2022	General	Nov. 8	Derrick Van Orden	Republican	164,743	51.82%	Brad Pfaff	Dem.	152,977	48.12%	317,922	11,766
