= Milton Montgomery =

Union Army officer (1825–1897)

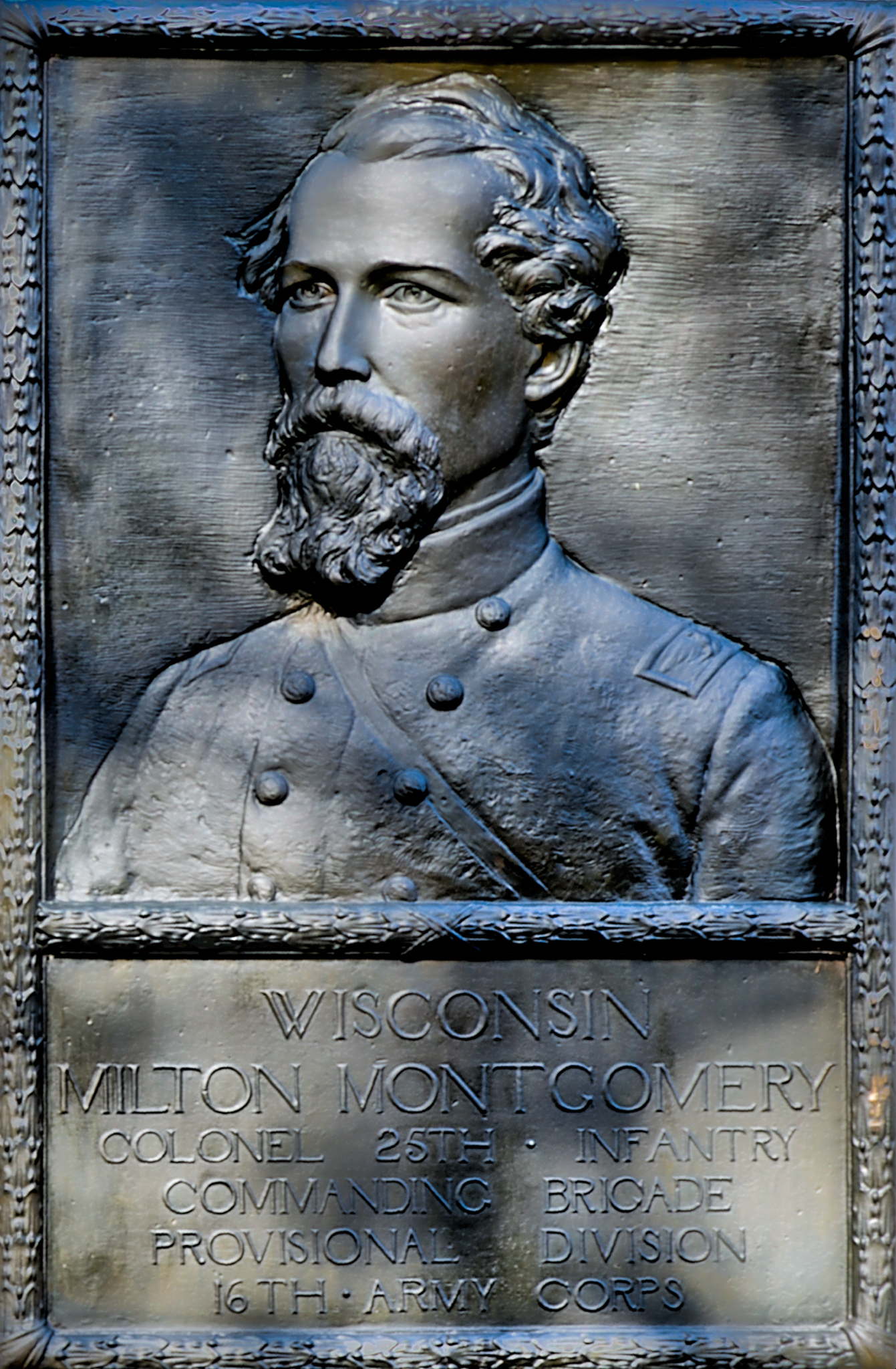
- Bronze relief portrait of Montgomery by T.A.R. Kitson, Vicksburg National Military Park
- Born: May 3, 1825; Olivesburg, Ohio, U.S.
- Died: May 23, 1897 (aged 72) Omaha, Nebraska, U.S.
- Buried: Wyuka Cemetery, Lincoln, Nebraska
- Allegiance: United States
- Branch: United States Army; Union Army
- Service years: 1862–1865
- Rank: Colonel, USV; Brevet Brig. General, USV
- Commands: 25th Reg. Wis. Vol. Infantry
- Conflicts: American Civil War

Milton Montgomery (May 3, 1825 – May 23, 1897) was a colonel in the Union Army during the American Civil War who was nominated and confirmed for appointment to the grade of brevet brigadier general in 1866.

== Biography ==
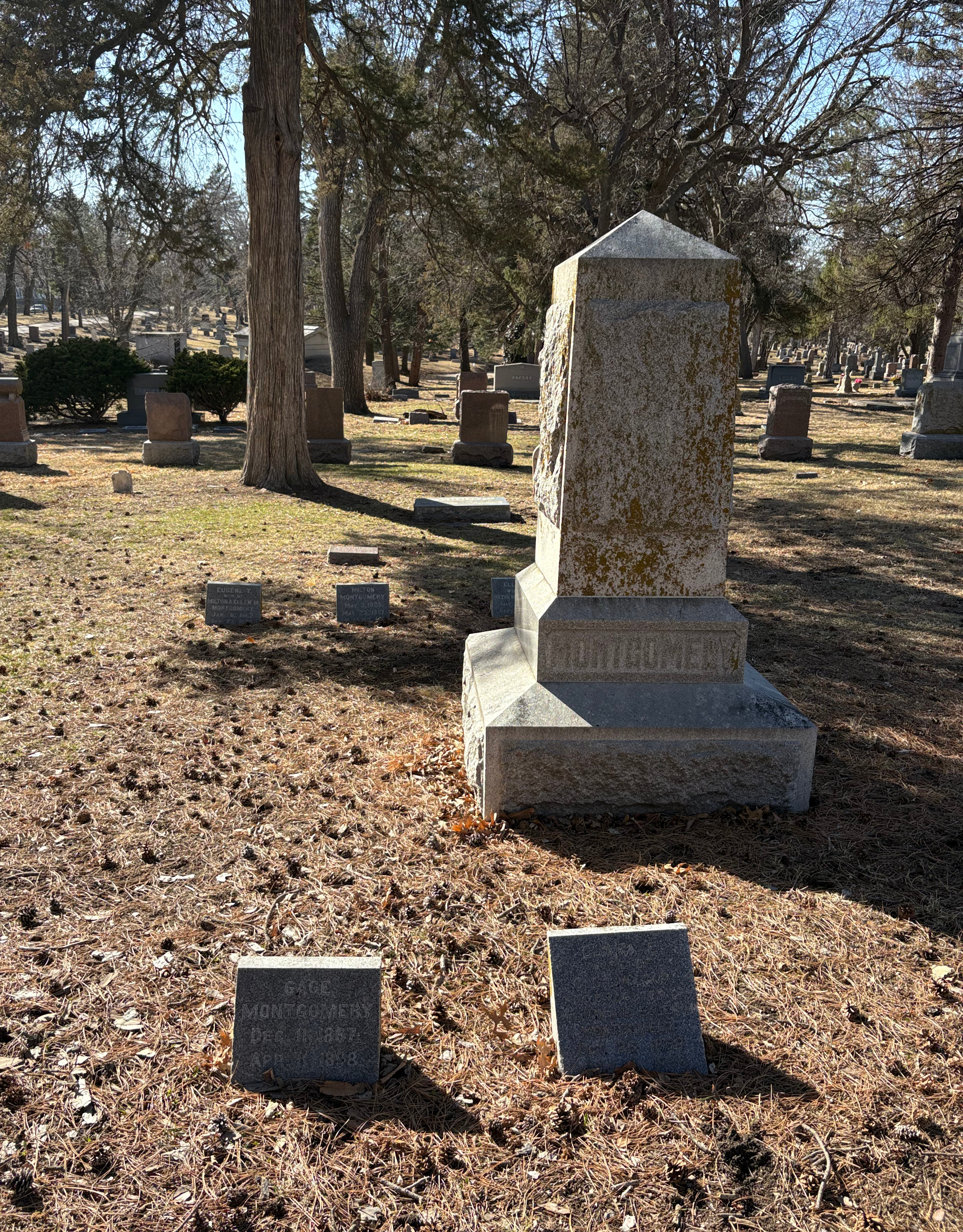
Montgomery's grave at Wyuka Cemetery

Montgomery was born on May 3, 1825, in Olivesburg, Ohio. He later moved to Sparta, Wisconsin. Montgomery died on May 23, 1897, in Omaha, Nebraska, and is buried in Wyuka Cemetery.

== Career ==
Montgomery began his Civil War service in command of the 25th Wisconsin Infantry Regiment on September 14, 1862. He suffered the loss of his right arm at Decatur, Georgia, during the Battle of Atlanta, where he was captured on July 22, 1864. He subsequently was exchanged. Despite the loss of his arm, Montgomery later took part in the Carolinas campaign. He commanded the 2nd Brigade, 1st Division, XVII Corps of the Army of the Tennessee from January 29, 1865, to March 28, 1865, and from May 20, 1865, to June 7, 1865. Montgomery was mustered out of the volunteers on June 7, 1865. On January 13, 1866, President Andrew Johnson nominated Montgomery for appointment to the grade of brevet brigadier general of volunteers to rank from March 13, 1865, and the United States Senate confirmed the appointment on March 12, 1866.

== See also ==
- List of American Civil War brevet generals
