= Michael J. Warner =

Irish-born American politician

Member of the Wisconsin State Assembly
- In office 1890-?

Personal details
- Born: February 15, 1843 County Cork, Ireland
- Died: 1919 (aged 75–76) United States
- Party: Democrat
- Military career
- Allegiance: Union Army
- Unit: 25th Wisconsin Volunteer Infantry Regiment
- Conflicts: American Civil War

Michael J. Warner (February 15, 1843 - 1919) was an Irish-born American member of the Wisconsin State Assembly.

== Biography ==
Warner was born on February 15, 1843, in County Cork, Ireland. He later moved to Adams County, Wisconsin. During the American Civil War, he served with the 25th Wisconsin Volunteer Infantry Regiment of the Union Army. In 1866, Warner moved to Hale, Wisconsin. He died in 1919.

== Political career ==
Warner was elected to the Assembly in 1890. Other positions he held include town clerk and chairman of the town board (similar to city council) of Hale. He was a Democrat.
