= Michael J. Wytrwal =

M.J. Wytrwal Coal Yard

Michael J. Wytrwal (12 September 1882 in Kraków, Austro-Hungarian Empire – 21 January 1970 Amsterdam, New York) was one of the successful businessmen and entrepreneurs of the 20th-century in Amsterdam, New York. He was actively engaged in managing a diversified portfolio of business interests that serve as the precursor to today's conglomerate. These interests include real estate, pharmaceuticals, furniture, timber holdings, insurance, defense contracting, consumer goods, banking and financial services, textiles, and energy via the M. J. Wytrwal Coal & Oil Company based in Amsterdam's famous Reid Hill in upstate New York and the Clyde Bank Knitting Company in Fort Plain.

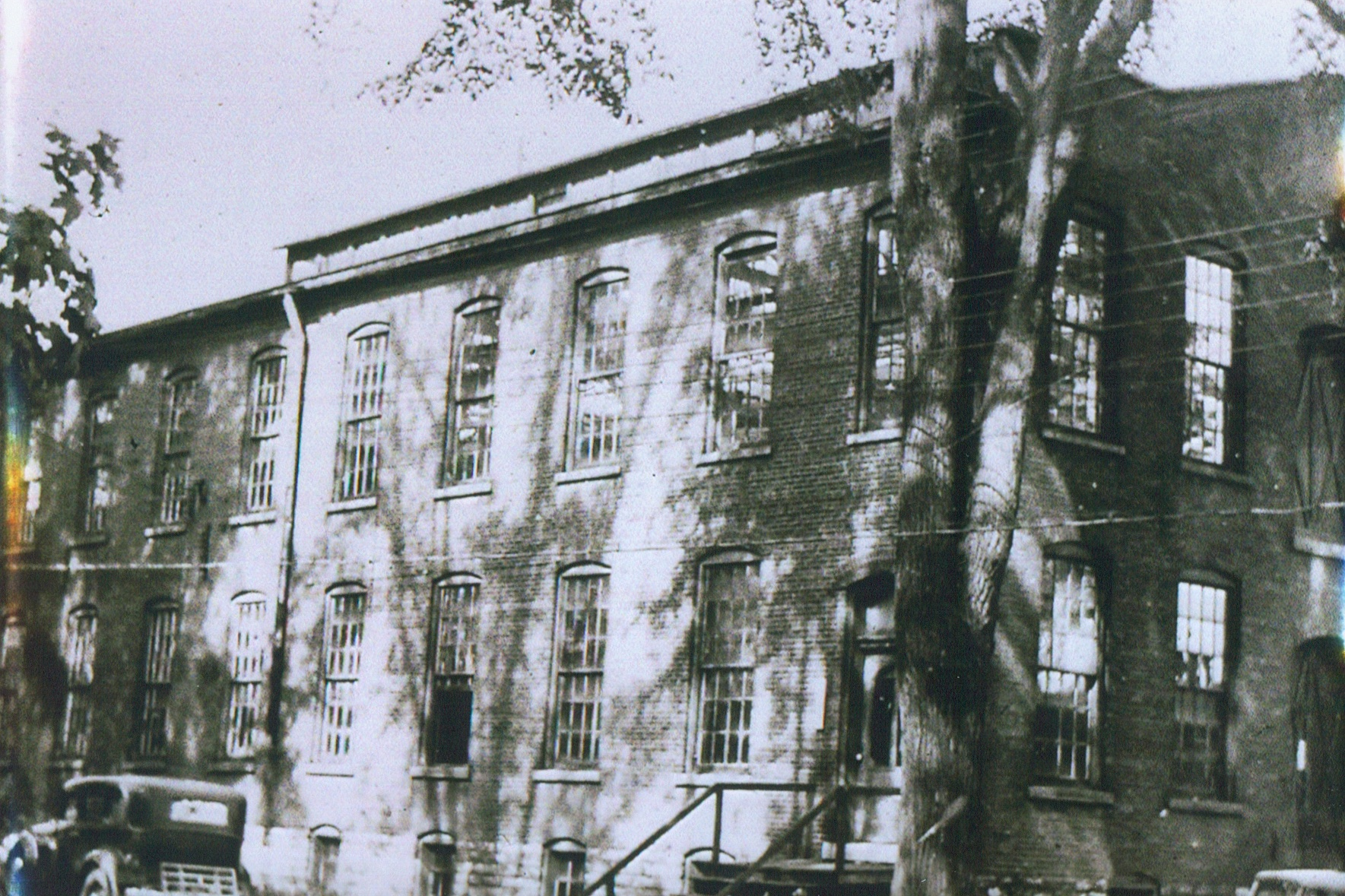
Clyde Bank Mill in Fort Plain, NY

At the age of 14, Wytrwal immigrated to the United States through Ellis Island, and moved to Amsterdam, a city located in Montgomery County, New York, just in time for the initial stellar growth of the booming textile, carpet and rug-making industries, powered by the rushing waters of the Chuctenunda Creek into the Mohawk River. These textile mills, run by the Sanfords, Shuttleworths and others, employed thousands of new immigrants, made superior floor covering products, and generated tremendous wealth for their shareholders. They were the building blocks of what is now known as Mohawk Industries of Calhoun, Georgia. This wealth generation and concentration in a small city of upstate New York resulted in the Fulton-Montgomery County region having the largest number of millionaires on a per capita basis in the U.S. during the early 1900s.

Wytrwal was one of the founding members and initial investors in forming the Amsterdam Federal Savings and Loan Association, a privately owned bank also known as the "Polish Bank" on Church Street. Many years later, the bank conducted an initial public offering and went public under the ticker symbol AFED, (Amsterdam Federal Savings) on October 1, 1996. AFED later merged with Amsterdam Savings Bank to form Mohawk Community Bank, which was later acquired by Hudson River Bank & Trust, which was acquired by First Niagara Financial Group, and is now part of KeyCorp, a US$135 billion bank based in Cleveland, Ohio.

He was widely recognized as one of the leading and prosperous merchants of Amsterdam and enjoyed an "unassailable reputation for integrity and reliability".

Wytrwal was actively in engaged in federal, state and local politics and assisted President, and former New York Governor, Franklin D. Roosevelt in implementing various economic relief programs during the Great Depression of the 1930s and was known as the "Polish Mayor" of Amsterdam.

In one of those assignments, he served as the Chairman, Montgomery County of the National Recovery Act (NRA). The NRA was a component of the New Deal's National Industrial Recovery Act of 1933. Wytrwal was well known for enjoying "welfare peanut butter" - he bought many jars from destitute people in the Mohawk Valley, those that could not find employment and were too proud to ask for a handout.

== Early life ==
Wytrwal was born on September 12, 1882, in Kraków, Prussia, and attended public schools there through the age of 14. In 1896, he sought out adventure and opportunity, immigrated to the US through Liberty Island, initially settling in Scranton, Pennsylvania. He stayed there for six months and then moved north to Amsterdam, New York.

== Family and personal life ==
Wytrwal was married twice — first to Ms. Mamie Brudzdowski on October 26, 1904, who died on February 26, 1906. He was remarried on May 24, 1907, to Ms. Josephine Bruzdowski. He had a total of 7 children — one son from his first marriage, and another son and five daughters in his second marriage.

Wytrwal died on January 21, 1970, at the age of 87 in Amsterdam, NY. He is survived by 5 generations of offspring.

Notable descendants of Michael Wytrwal include the late Dr. Raymond Wytrwal of St. Johnsville, NY; former New York Lieutenant Governor Mary Anne Krupsak, an attorney and entrepreneur, who was one of the leading pioneers of women's rights in the 1970s; and Army Colonel Edmund Luzine, a veteran of operations in former Yugoslavia, Afghanistan and Iraq, finance professor and global emerging markets investment banker.

Wytrwal Industries, LLC — is a consulting and advisory firm focused on finance, economics, natural resources, and the global emerging markets with offices in upstate New York and Miami-Dade County. It is managed by Ed Luzine, Michael Wytrwal's great-grandson.
