= Samuel Black (state representative) =

American politician

Samuel Black was a member of the Wisconsin State Assembly.

== Biography ==
Black was born on July 4, 1827, in what was then part of Sangamon County, Illinois. During the American Civil War, he was a captain with the 85th Illinois Volunteer Infantry Regiment the Union Army. Operations he took part in include the Confederate Heartland Offensive. After resigning from the Army as a result of ill health, Black began farming in Dunn County, Wisconsin. He died on February 18, 1916.

== Political career ==
Black was a member of the Assembly during the 1877 session. Other positions he held include County Clerk of Dunn County, town chairman (similar to mayor) and justice of the peace. He was a Republican.
