= Michael J. Walsh =

American designer and creative director

Michael J. Walsh (fl. since 2003) is an American designer and creative director who has worked or consulted at the School of Visual Arts, Harry N. Abrams, the Walt Disney Company, Time Inc, Turner Broadcasting, Time Warner and The Washington Post Magazine, among others. He has won over 300 awards for design and art direction in American and international awards competitions for digital, video, exhibition design, multimedia projects and print projects.

Work Represented in the Following Collections AIGA Archives at the Denver Art Museum—Permanent Collection Columbia University—Permanent Collection at Butler Library Cooper-Hewitt, National Design Museum—Permanent Collection International Center of Photography (ICP) Library Library of Congress—Permanent Collection & Special Collections Reading Room Metropolitan Museum of Art, Thomas J. Watson Library Museum of Modern Art (MoMA) —Permanent Collection, Library & Archives The Wolfsonian Museum—Florida International University Collection of Art & Design Yale University—Robert B. Haas Family Arts Library

Work Featured in the Following Publications Becoming A Graphic Designer (4th Edition) Steven Heller /Teresa Fernandes, <Wiley Publishers>

New Ornamental Type: Decorative Lettering in the Digital Age Steven Heller/Gail Anderson, <Thames & Hudson Publishers>

The Language of Graphic Design: An Illustrated Handbook for Understanding Fundamental Design Principles Richard Poulin, <Rockport Publishers>

Visible Signs: An Introduction to Semiotics in the Visual Arts (2nd edition) David Crow, <Ava Academia Publishing, United Kingdom>

Awards and honors include: American Illustration American Institute of Graphic Arts (AIGA) AIGA 50 books/50 covers American Photography American Association of Museums (AAM) Applied Arts Art Direction Magazine Art Directors Club (ADC), New York & D.C., Art Direction & Design (AD&D) UK Benjamin Franklin Book Awards PMA Communication Arts Magazine Cooper-Hewitt National Design Award Creativity Magazine The Creative Review Annual UK International Davey Awards Design Observer/American Institute of Graphic Arts Graphis Design Annual Graphis Poster Competition Higher Education 25th Annual Advertising Awards HOW In-HOWse Design Awards, Best of Show HOW International Design Awards HOW Magazine “Perfect 10’’ Awards HOW Promotion & Marketing Design Awards I.D. Annual Design Review LERN International Awards Literary Marketplace (LMP), Individual Achievement award New York Book Show One Show Design Print Magazine Creativity + Commerce Business Red Dot Award Society of Newspaper Designers (SND) Society of Publication Designers (SPD) Summit International Creative awards Sunday Magazine National Cover competitions Type Directors Club University & College Designers Association (UCDA)W3 Web design awards Webby Awards Web Marketing Association University & College Designers Association (Excellence 2005, Gold 2006, Excellence 2009, Excellence 2010, Excellence 2012, Excellence 2013, Excellence 2014), GRAPHIS (2010, 2011, 2012, 2013, 2014, 2015), and the Red Dot International Design Awards.
