= 47th Wisconsin Infantry Regiment =

Union Army infantry regiment

- Flag of Wisconsin
- Active: February 27, 1865 – September 4, 1865
- Country: United States
- Allegiance: Union
- Branch: Infantry
- Size: Regiment
- Engagements: American Civil War

Commanders
- Colonel: George Clay Ginty

The 47th Wisconsin Infantry Regiment was a volunteer infantry regiment that served in the Union Army during the American Civil War.

== Service ==
The 47th Wisconsin was organized at Madison, Wisconsin, and mustered into Federal service on February 27, 1865, arriving at Louisville, Kentucky, on February 28. They then travelled to Nashville, then Tullahoma, Tennessee, at the junction of the McMinnville and Manchester Railroad with the Nashville and Chattanooga Railroad. They remained here on guard duty until August, when they returned to Nashville where they were mustered out.

The regiment returned to Madison, Wisconsin, on September 4, 1865, where they were paid and disbanded.

== Casualties ==
The 47th Wisconsin suffered 39 enlisted men who died of disease, for a total of 39 fatalities.

== Commanders ==
- Colonel George Clay Ginty

== Notable people ==
- Nels Anderson, 1st Lt. of Co. D, later a Wisconsin state legislator.
- Charles H. Baxter, Captain of Co. K, later a Wisconsin state legislator.
- Thomas J. Shear, later a Wisconsin state legislator.
- William Young, Captain of Co. A, later a Wisconsin state legislator.

== See also ==
- List of Wisconsin Civil War units
- Wisconsin in the American Civil War
