= Herman Naber =

American politician

Herman Naber (November 12, 1826 – April 11, 1909) was an American farmer, politician, and jurist.

Born in what is now Germany, Naber emigrated to the United States in 1848 and settled first in Dodge County, Wisconsin and then moved to Shawano, Shawano County, Wisconsin in 1858 where he farmed. Naber served on the Dodge and Shawano Counties Boards of Supervisors. He was a Presidential elector in the 1876 election for the Democrat. In 1875 and 1876, Naber was mayor of Shawano, Wisconsin and also served as county judge for Shawano County. In 1864, 1875, 1880, and 1883, Naber served in the Wisconsin State Assembly and was an Independent Democrat. Naber died in Shawano, Wisconsin.
