= Durand (town), Wisconsin =

Durand, Wisconsin
- Town
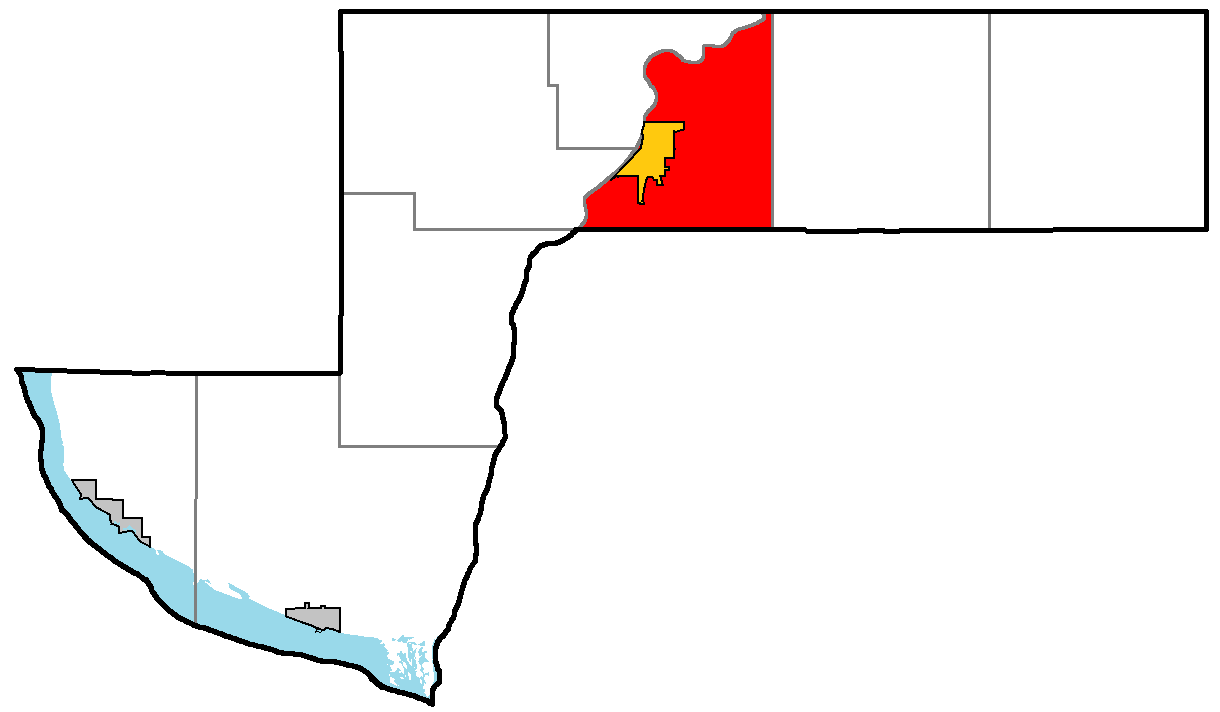
- Location of Durand (town), Pepin County

- Location of Pepin County, Wisconsin
- Coordinates: 44°38′27″N 91°56′15″W
- Country: United States
- State: Wisconsin
- County: Pepin

Area
  - Total: 19.1 sq mi (49.4 km^{2})
  - Land: 18.5 sq mi (47.9 km^{2})
  - Water: 0.54 sq mi (1.4 km^{2})
- Elevation: 810 ft (247 m)

Population (2020)
  - Total: 710
  - Density: 38/sq mi (15/km^{2})
- Time zone: UTC-6 (Central (CST))
  - Summer (DST): UTC-5 (CDT)
- Area codes: 715 & 534
- FIPS code: 55-21250
- GNIS feature ID: 1583109
- Website: https://www.townofdurand.com/

Durand (/dəˈrænd/ də-RAND) is a town in Pepin County, Wisconsin, United States. The population was 710 at the 2020 census. The City of Durand is located within the town.

== Geography ==
According to the United States Census Bureau, the town has a total area of 19.1 square miles (49.4 km^{2}), of which 18.5 square miles (47.9 km^{2}) is land and 0.6 square mile (1.4 km^{2}) (2.89%) is water.

== Demographics ==
As of the census of 2000, there were 694 people, 237 households, and 190 families residing in the town. The population density was 37.5 people per square mile (14.5/km^{2}). There were 245 housing units at an average density of 13.2 per square mile (5.1/km^{2}). The racial makeup of the town was 99.14% White, 0.58% Native American and 0.29% Asian. 0.00% of the population were Hispanic or Latino of any race.

There were 237 households, out of which 46.4% had children under the age of 18 living with them, 70.0% were married couples living together, 6.3% had a female householder with no husband present, and 19.8% were non-families. 18.1% of all households were made up of individuals, and 9.3% had someone living alone who was 65 years of age or older. The average household size was 2.93 and the average family size was 3.33.

In the town, the population was spread out, with 32.1% under the age of 18, 7.8% from 18 to 24, 29.8% from 25 to 44, 20.7% from 45 to 64, and 9.5% who were 65 years of age or older. The median age was 34 years. For every 100 females, there were 94.9 males. For every 100 females age 18 and over, there were 95.4 males.

The median income for a household in the town was $49,375, and the median income for a family was $53,636. Males had a median income of $32,135 versus $22,237 for females. The per capita income for the town was $18,878. About 3.7% of families and 4.8% of the population were below the poverty line, including 7.6% of those under age 18 and 4.0% of those age 65 or over.
