= List of Little House on the Prairie locations =

List of places appearing in the Little House on the Prairie books and TV series.

== Laura's little houses ==
=== Laura's birthplace in Wisconsin ===
Pepin, Wisconsin, was Wilder's birthplace. Her birthplace is about seven miles (11 km) north of the village, and is marked by a replica cabin along the former WIS-183 at the Little House Wayside (near Lund, Wisconsin). Pepin celebrates her life every September with traditional music, craft demonstrations, a "Laura look-alike" contest, a spelling bee, and other events.

=== Independence, Kansas ===
Independence, Kansas, is the location where the Ingalls family settled on the Osage Diminished Reserve from 1869 to 1870, and was at the center of the plot of the book, Little House on the Prairie. Within a year of settling, the government required the family to vacate, and they never returned.

Laura had always heard from her family that the home was "40 miles [64 km] from Independence", which would have put the house approximately where the town of Nowata, Oklahoma, is today. It was, in fact, about 13 miles (21 km) from Independence, not 40 miles (64 km), though the surveying techniques of the day would in fact have measured it as being 14 miles (23 km). The reason for this rather large discrepancy is not known, although she may have misheard or mis-remembered "fourteen" as "forty".

The actual site of the Charles Ingalls house on Indian land was located in what is now the southeast corner of Section 36, Rutland Township, Montgomery County, Kansas. It is the only quarter section in that area with no claim filed in 1870 (no claims could be filed until 1871, and the Ingalls' had returned to Wisconsin by then) and it is the only quarter section with a hand-dug well (which Pa told of digging shortly after their arrival there). Carrie Ingalls' birth is also recorded as being in Montgomery County, Kansas, in August 1870. Today, there is a facsimile log cabin at the site.

The state of Kansas has designated the childhood home of Laura Ingalls southwest of Independence as a historic site, which is open to visitors. The site includes a cabin modeled after the original Ingalls cabin. Sunnyside School House has been moved to the site and the original post office used at nearby Wayside, Kansas, has also been moved to the location. Much of the surrounding countryside retains its open and undeveloped nature.

=== Walnut Grove, Minnesota ===
In 1874, when Wilder was seven years old, the family left their home near Pepin for the second time, and settled just outside Walnut Grove, Minnesota. Walnut Grove may be the most recognized name of all the towns Wilder wrote about in her books (although it is the only town she did not mention by name) because Michael Landon's television series Little House on the Prairie of the 1970s and 1980s was set here. Although the show depicts the family as living here through Wilder's adulthood, in reality, they only lived here a few years.

=== Burr Oak, Iowa ===
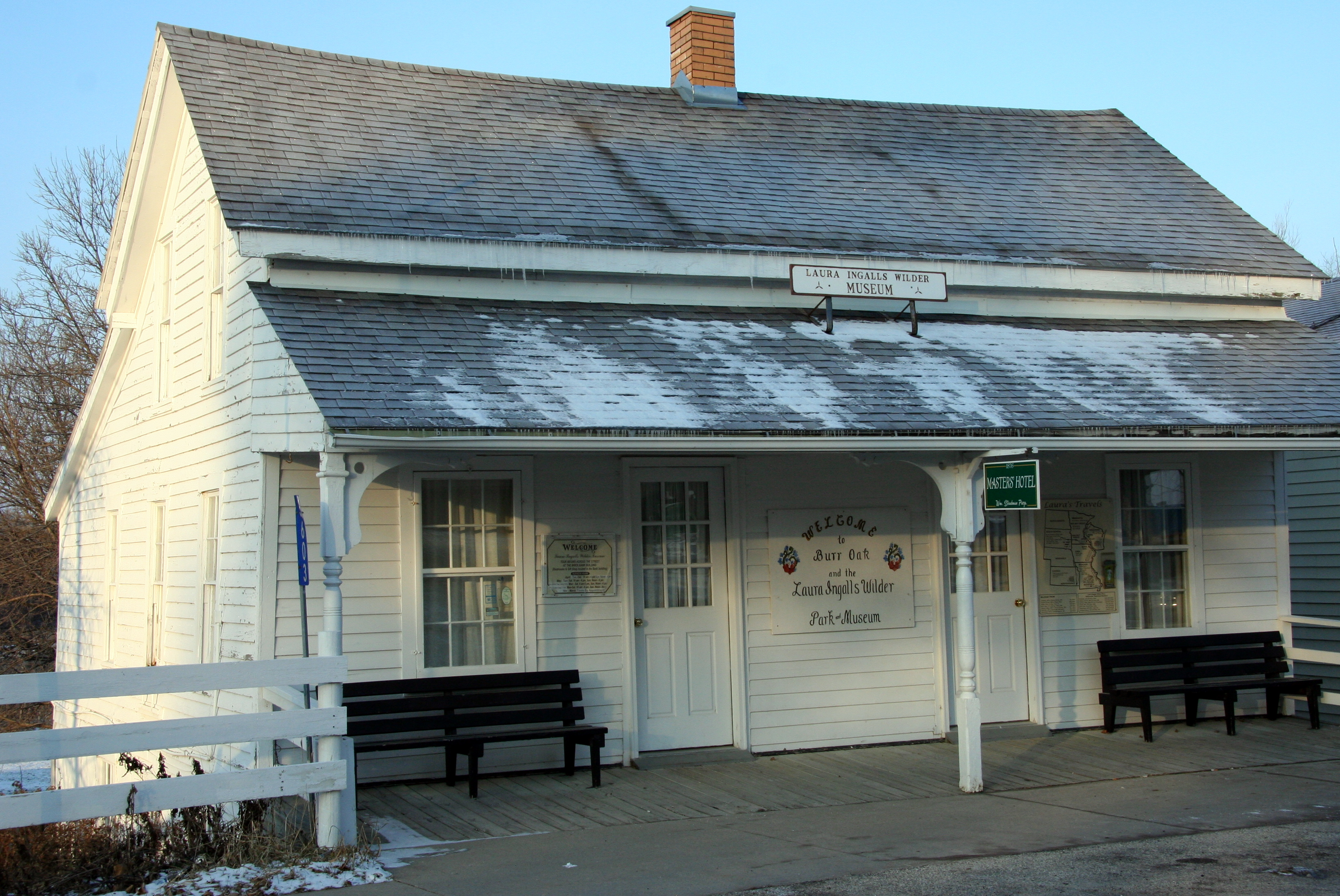
The Masters' Hotel Museum in Burr Oak, Iowa, 2009

The Ingalls family moved to Burr Oak, Iowa, briefly in 1876 so that Pa could take a job co-managing The Masters' Hotel. They would stay for only one year, before returning to Walnut Grove, and the family's time in Burr Oak was never mentioned in any of the "Little House" books. In 1976, the restored Hotel was opened as a museum.

=== De Smet, South Dakota ===
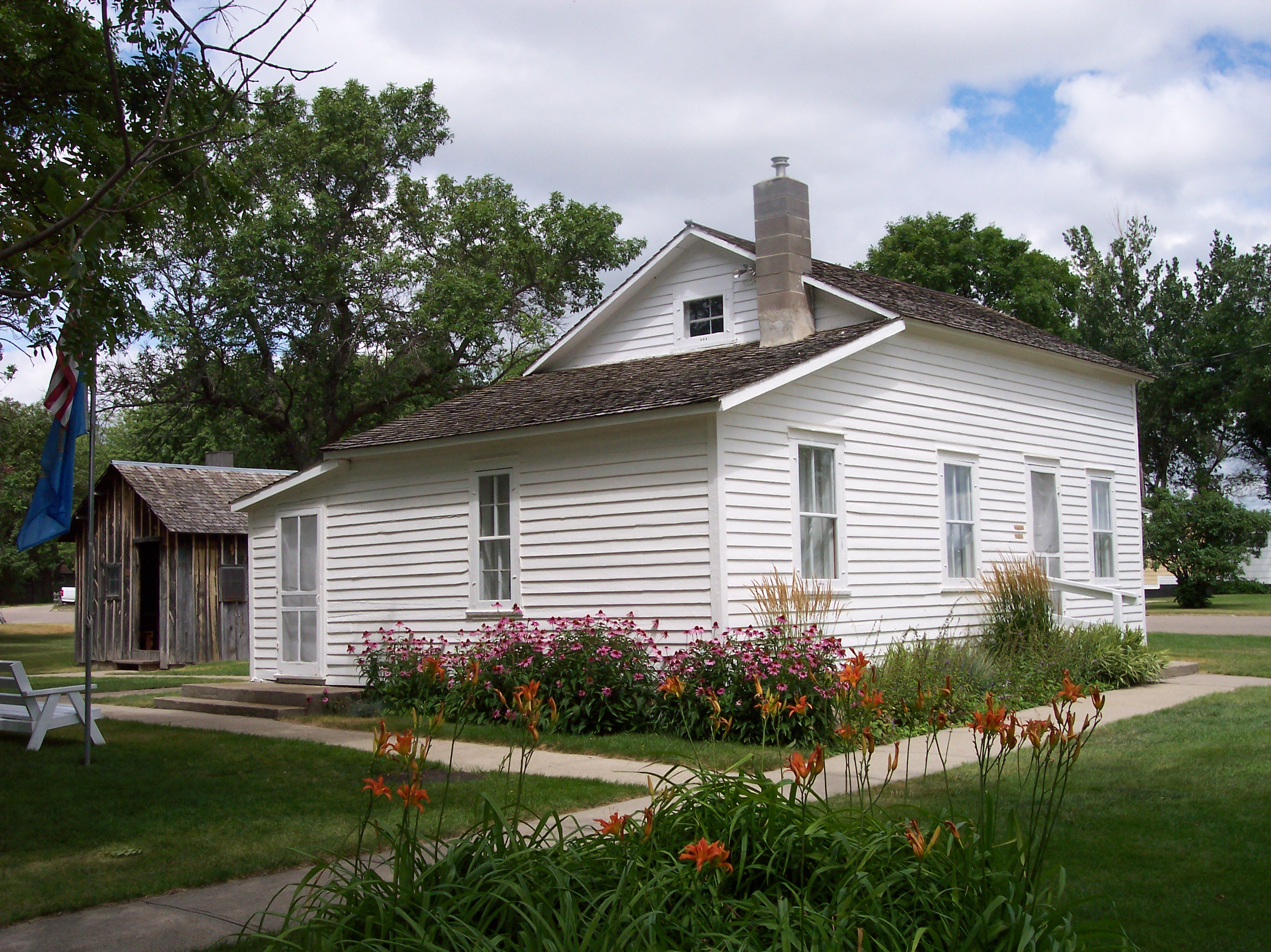
The Surveyors' House historic site in De Smet, South Dakota, with replica Brewster School in background, 2005

De Smet, South Dakota, attracts many fans with its historic sites from the books By the Shores of Silver Lake, The Long Winter, Little Town on the Prairie, These Happy Golden Years, and The First Four Years. The Ingalls family moved to De Smet from Minnesota in 1879, and most members of the family lived there (or nearby) for the rest of their lives. Locations in the area that have been restored and are open to visitors include: the Surveyors' House, where the family stayed during the winter of 1879–80 (the house was moved into town in 1885 from its original location on Silver Lake); the Ingalls Homestead southeast of town; a replica of the Brewster School, where Wilder taught as a teenager; and a house on Third Street built by Charles Ingalls in 1887 (Wilder herself never lived there, as she was already married when the house was built). Charles, Caroline, Mary, Carrie, and Grace Ingalls, and the unnamed infant son of Laura and Almanzo Wilder are buried in the De Smet Cemetery. Laura and Almanzo Wilder stayed briefly in Westville, Florida, in the 1890s, and they moved permanently to Mansfield, Missouri, in 1894.

=== Mansfield, Missouri ===
Mansfield, Missouri, is the chosen final home town of Laura Ingalls Wilder. It was here, on her farm, that she wrote the Little House books. Each year the whole town celebrates with a festival, turning back the clock to the late 19th century. During the festival, the town square becomes a showcase for handmade crafts. There is a big parade, and folk music is played from the gazebo in the park.

== Other places ==
=== A ===
Alaska

=== B ===
- Big Sky Ranch
- Big Slough (Kingsbury County, South Dakota)
- Boston, Massachusetts
- Boulder, Colorado
- Brookfield, Wisconsin
- Burke (village), New York
- Burr Oak, Iowa

=== C ===
- Carthage, South Dakota
- Columbia, California
- Columbia River
- Campton Township, Kane County, Illinois
- Concord, Wisconsin
- Cuba (town), New York

=== D ===
- Dakota Territory
- Danbury, Connecticut
- De Smet Cemetery
- De Smet, South Dakota

=== E ===
- Elgin, Illinois

=== H ===
- Holland (town), New York

=== I ===
- Indian Territory
- Independence, Kansas
- Iowa Braille and Sight Saving School

=== J ===
- Jamestown, California

=== K ===
- Keystone, South Dakota

=== L ===
- Lake City, Minnesota
- Lake Henry
- Lake Michigan
- Lake Pepin
- Lake Thompson
- Little House Wayside
- Lund, Wisconsin

=== M ===
- Malone (town), New York
- Manchester, South Dakota
- Mankato, Minnesota
- Mansfield, Missouri
- Montgomery County, Kansas
- Mount Rushmore

=== N ===
- North Hero Township, Redwood County, Minnesota

=== P ===
- Pedro, South Dakota
- Pepin (town), Wisconsin
- Pepin, Wisconsin
- Plum Creek (Redwood County, Minnesota)

=== R ===
- Redfield College (South Dakota)
- Redfield, South Dakota
- Rome, Wisconsin
- Roseland, South Dakota
- Rothville, Missouri
- Roxbury, Massachusetts

=== S ===
- Silver Lake (Kingsbury County, South Dakota)
- Simi Valley, California
- Sleepy Eye, Minnesota
- Sonora, California
- South Troy, Minnesota
- Spirit Lake
- Springfield, Minnesota
- Springfield, Missouri
- Spring Valley, Minnesota

St. Louis, Missouri

=== T ===
- Topbar, South Dakota
- Tracy, Minnesota
- Tuolumne City, California

=== V ===
- Verdigris River
- Vinton, Iowa

=== W ===
- Walnut Grove, Minnesota
- Westville, Florida
- Winoka, South Dakota

=== Z ===
- Zumbro Falls, Minnesota
- Zumbro River
