= 1884 United States presidential election in Wisconsin =

- November 4, 1884
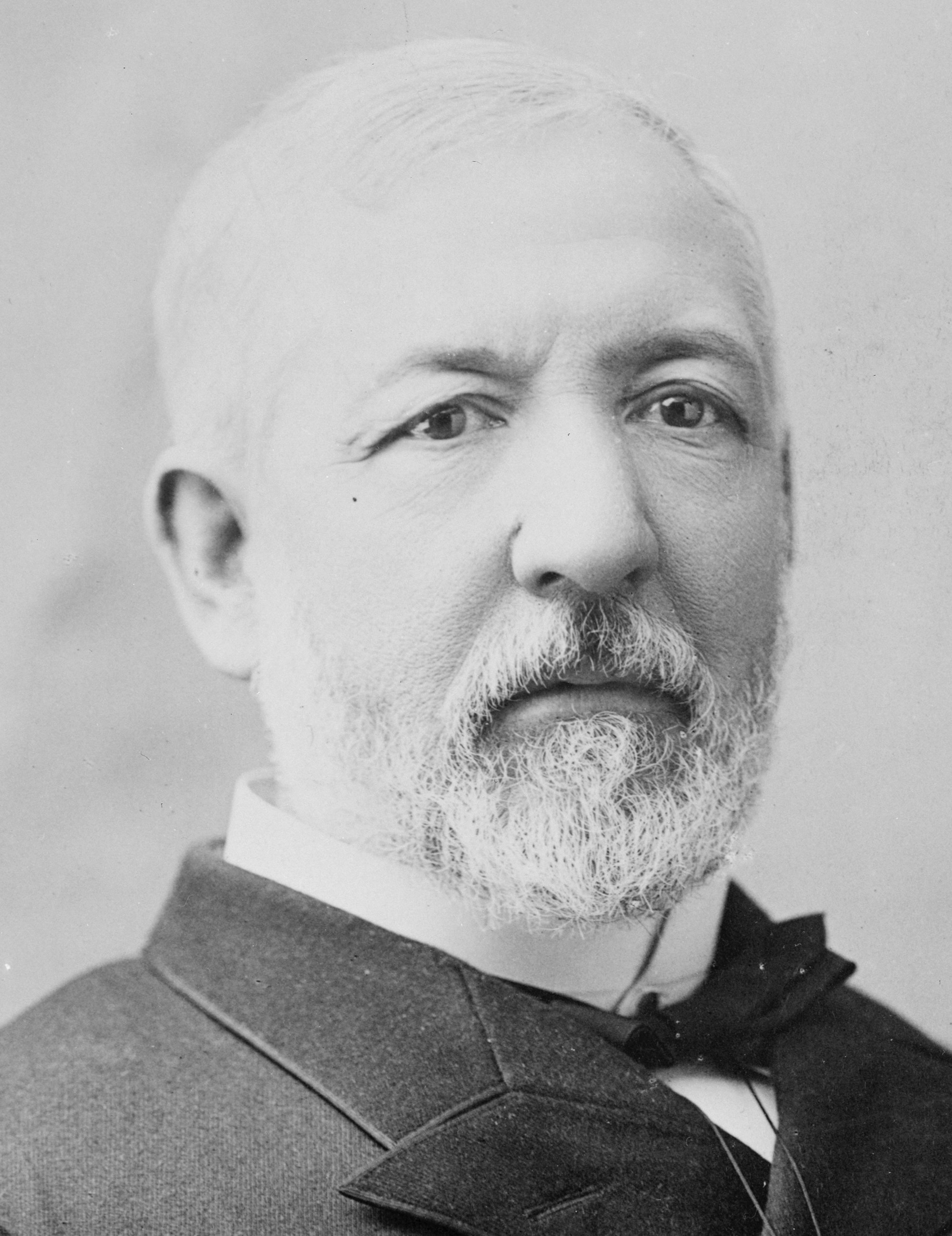

Nominee	James G. Blaine	Grover Cleveland
Party	Republican	Democratic
Home state	Maine	New York
Running mate	John A. Logan	Thomas A. Hendricks
Electoral vote	11	0
Popular vote	161,157	146,477
Percentage	50.37%	45.78%
County results
Blaine
40–50%
50–60%
60–70%
70–80%
90–100%
Cleveland
40–50%
50–60%
60–70%
70–80%
President before election
Chester A. Arthur
Republican
Elected President
Grover Cleveland
Democratic

The 1884 United States presidential election in Wisconsin was held on November 4, 1884, as part of the 1884 United States presidential election. State voters chose 11 electors to the Electoral College, who voted for president and vice president.

Republican Party candidate James G. Blaine won Wisconsin with 50.37% of the popular vote, winning the state's eleven electoral votes.

Starting with this election, Ashland County voted for the statewide winner in every election until 1944; Chippewa County also began such a streak that lasted until 1940.

== Results ==
General Election Results (Note: The 1885 Blue Book gives the totals as Blaine 161,157; Cleveland 146,477; St. John 7,649; Butler 4,598; and no Scattering. These totals are not incorrect per se; an elector on each ticket received that number of votes, but in the case of Blaine, Cleveland, and St. John, they are not the totals for the highest elector on each ticket. The 1885 Blue Book does not give the results for all electors.)
Party	Pledged to	Elector	Votes
Republican Party	James G. Blaine	James W. Ostrander	161,157
Republican Party	James G. Blaine	William M. Fogo	161,152
Republican Party	James G. Blaine	Daniel C. Van Brunt	161,152
Republican Party	James G. Blaine	Benjamin T. Rogers	161,149
Republican Party	James G. Blaine	Edward W. Arndt	161,147
Republican Party	James G. Blaine	John Rugee	161,147
Republican Party	James G. Blaine	Joseph Harris	161,144
Republican Party	James G. Blaine	Ferdinand A. Husher	161,140
Republican Party	James G. Blaine	Charles J. L. Meyer	161,135
Republican Party	James G. Blaine	Edward L. Browne	161,132
Republican Party	James G. Blaine	Canute Anderson	161,130
Democratic Party	Grover Cleveland	J. W. Woodworth	146,477
Democratic Party	Grover Cleveland	George A. Abert	146,454
Democratic Party	Grover Cleveland	J. W. Hancock	146,454
Democratic Party	Grover Cleveland	John Lawler	146,454
Democratic Party	Grover Cleveland	Nelson Dewey	146,453
Democratic Party	Grover Cleveland	P. G. Stroud	146,453
Democratic Party	Grover Cleveland	S. N. Dickerson	146,450
Democratic Party	Grover Cleveland	Theodore Kersten	146,450
Democratic Party	Grover Cleveland	Leonard Martin	146,450
Democratic Party	Grover Cleveland	Matt Arnstad	146,437
Democratic Party	Grover Cleveland	H. G. Winslow	146,430
Prohibition Party	John St. John	W. J. McKay	7,656
Prohibition Party	John St. John	Ole Benson	7,655
Prohibition Party	John St. John	Henry Colman	7,655
Prohibition Party	John St. John	J. H. Penberthy	7,654
Prohibition Party	John St. John	Joseph Rohr	7,653
Prohibition Party	John St. John	A. C. Merryman	7,652
Prohibition Party	John St. John	T. D. Stone	7,652
Prohibition Party	John St. John	E. G. Comstock	7,651
Prohibition Party	John St. John	J. J. Blaisdell	7,649
Prohibition Party	John St. John	Christian Carlson	7,642
Prohibition Party	John St. John	A. J. Smith	7,513
Greenback Party	Benjamin Butler	E. W. Dwight	4,598
Greenback Party	Benjamin Butler	Lorenzo Merrill	4,598
Greenback Party	Benjamin Butler	Theodore Fritz	4,597
Greenback Party	Benjamin Butler	Allen Stetson	4,597
Greenback Party	Benjamin Butler	Reuben May	4,590
Greenback Party	Benjamin Butler	J. B. McLeran	4,590
Greenback Party	Benjamin Butler	George Will	4,587
Greenback Party	Benjamin Butler	R. E. Pascher	4,584
Greenback Party	Benjamin Butler	Edward M. McGraw	4,581
Greenback Party	Benjamin Butler	Thomas Wilcox	4,571
Greenback Party	Benjamin Butler	E. P. Allis	2,598
Greenback Party	Benjamin Butler	Henry Smith	2,031
Write-in		Scattering	63
Votes cast (Note: Based on totals for highest elector on each ticket)			319,951

=== Results by county ===
County	James G. Blaine Republican		Grover Cleveland Democratic		John St. John Prohibition		Benjamin Butler Greenback		Margin		Total votes cast (Note: Based on highest elector on each ticket)
County	#	%	#	%	#	%	#	%	#	%	Total votes cast
Adams	1,002	67.70%	454	30.68%	9	0.61%	5	0.34%	548	37.03%	1,480 (Note: Includes 10 Scattering votes)
Ashland	1,084	61.17%	672	37.92%	16	0.90%	0	0.00%	412	23.25%	1,772
Barron	1,695	65.34%	792	30.53%	70	2.70%	19	0.73%	903	34.81%	2,594 (Note: Includes 18 Scattering votes)
Bayfield	431	63.85%	243	36.00%	1	0.15%	0	0.00%	188	27.85%	675
Brown	2,946	43.94%	3,681	54.90%	44	0.66%	34	0.51%	-735	-10.96%	6,705
Buffalo	1,544	55.08%	1,225	43.70%	3	0.11%	31	1.11%	319	11.38%	2,803
Burnett	601	94.65%	27	4.25%	1	0.16%	6	0.94%	574	90.39%	635
Calumet	957	29.16%	2,136	65.08%	48	1.46%	140	4.27%	-1,179	-35.92%	3,282 (Note: Includes 1 Scattering vote)
Chippewa	2.545	49.43%	2,500	48.55%	48	0.93%	56	1.09%	45	0.87%	5,149
Clark	1,953	58.13%	1,244	37.02%	53	1.58%	104	3.10%	709	21.10%	3,360 (Note: Includes 6 Scattering votes)
Columbia	3,470	54.60%	2,630	41.38%	248	3.90%	7	0.11%	840	13.22%	6,355
Crawford	1,538	47.57%	1,613	49.89%	35	1.08%	47	1.45%	-75	-2.32%	3,233
Dane	6,221	46.96%	6,410	48.39%	571	4.31%	45	0.34%	-189	-1.43%	13,247
Dodge	3,145	33.10%	6,145	64.68%	96	1.01%	115	1.21%	-3,000	-31.58%	9,501
Door	1,838	60.08%	1,117	36.52%	34	1.11%	70	2.29%	721	23.57%	3,059
Douglas	275	52.38%	249	47.43%	1	0.19%	0	0.00%	26	4.95%	525
Dunn	2,536	65.46%	1,202	31.03%	60	1.55%	76	1.96%	1,334	34.43%	3,874
Eau Claire	3,622	53.36%	2,949	43.44%	152	2.24%	65	0.96%	673	9.91%	6,788
Florence	362	71.26%	142	27.95%	4	0.79%	0	0.00%	220	43.31%	508
Fond du Lac	4,275	44.26%	4,878	50.51%	214	2.22%	291	3.01%	-603	-6.24%	9,658
Grant	4,137	52.65%	3,250	41.36%	347	4.42%	124	1.58%	887	11.29%	7,858
Green	2,568	50.36%	1,894	37.14%	349	6.84%	288	5.65%	674	13.22%	5,099
Green Lake	1,525	51.09%	1,292	43.28%	155	5.19%	11	0.37%	233	7.81%	2,985 (Note: Includes 2 Scattering votes)
Iowa	2,463	47.83%	2,297	44.61%	385	7.48%	4	0.08%	166	3.22%	5,149
Jackson	2,060	65.50%	965	30.68%	41	1.30%	79	2.51%	1,095	34.82%	3,145
Jefferson	2,914	39.58%	4,227	57.41%	209	2.84%	13	0.18%	-1,313	-17.83%	7,363
Juneau	2,012	51.95%	1,710	44.15%	125	3.23%	26	0.67%	302	7.80%	3,873
Kenosha	1,705	51.79%	1,557	47.30%	30	0.91%	0	0.00%	148	4.50%	3,292
Kewaunee	746	27.02%	2,006	72.65%	9	0.33%	0	0.00%	-1,260	-45.64%	2,761
La Crosse	3,780	51.34%	3,442	46.75%	125	1.70%	16	0.22%	338	4.59%	7,363
Lafayette	2,491	50.17%	2,198	44.27%	230	4.63%	46	0.93%	293	5.90%	4,965
Langlade	559	45.15%	628	50.73%	23	1.86%	28	2.26%	-69	-5.57%	1,238
Lincoln	1,077	51.14%	989	46.96%	14	0.66%	26	1.23%	88	4.18%	2,106
Manitowoc	2,525	37.31%	4,203	62.10%	37	0.55%	3	0.04%	-1,678	-24.79%	6,768
Marathon	2,144	38.36%	3,358	60.08%	22	0.39%	65	1.16%	-1,214	-21.72%	5,589
Marinette	2,026	66.38%	924	30.28%	101	3.31%	1	0.03%	1,102	36.11%	3,052
Marquette	940	45.54%	1,078	52.23%	39	1.89%	7	0.34%	-138	-6.69%	2,064
Milwaukee	16,846	49.18%	16,287	47.55%	221	0.65%	901	2.63%	559	1.63%	34,255
Monroe	2,633	52.12%	2,207	43.69%	138	2.73%	74	1.46%	426	8.43%	5,052
Oconto	1,494	57.86%	1,033	40.01%	53	2.05%	2	0.08%	461	17.85%	2,582
Outagamie	2,644	37.37%	4,169	58.93%	70	0.99%	192	2.71%	-1,525	-21.55%	7,075
Ozaukee	716	24.59%	2,171	74.55%	9	0.31%	16	0.55%	-1,455	-49.97%	2,912
Pepin	957	68.90%	413	29.73%	8	0.58%	11	0.79%	544	39.16%	1,389
Pierce	2,478	65.35%	1,120	29.54%	156	4.11%	38	1.00%	1,358	35.81%	3,792
Polk	1,718	70.38%	627	25.69%	90	3.69%	0	0.00%	1,091	44.69%	2,441 (Note: Includes 6 Scattering votes)
Portage	2,319	49.38%	2,257	48.06%	76	1.62%	44	0.94%	62	1.32%	4,696
Price	794	69.41%	329	28.76%	2	0.17%	0	0.00%	465	40.65%	1,144 (Note: Includes 19 Scattering votes)
Racine	4,065	51.82%	3,459	44.09%	299	3.81%	22	0.28%	606	7.72%	7,845
Richland	2,459	54.67%	1,785	39.68%	215	4.78%	39	0.87%	674	14.98%	4,498
Rock	6,265	61.74%	3,447	33.97%	370	3.65%	65	0.64%	2,818	27.77%	10,147
Sauk	3,557	56.88%	2,381	38.08%	244	3.90%	71	1.14%	1,176	18.81%	6,253
Sawyer	298	72.33%	109	26.46%	5	1.21%	0	0.00%	189	45.87%	412
Shawano	1,398	47.78%	1,404	47.98%	43	1.47%	81	2.77%	-6	-0.21%	2,926
Sheboygan	3,511	45.02%	3,986	51.12%	107	1.37%	194	2.49%	-475	-6.09%	7,798
St. Croix	2,502	51.58%	2,237	46.11%	107	2.21%	5	0.10%	265	5.46%	4,851
Taylor	789	56.60%	604	43.33%	1	0.07%	0	0.00%	185	13.27%	1,394
Trempealeau	2,166	59.15%	1,285	35.09%	100	2.73%	111	3.03%	881	24.06%	3,662
Vernon	2,916	59.93%	1,568	32.22%	195	4.01%	187	3.84%	1,348	27.70%	4,866
Walworth	4,323	63.52%	2,115	31.08%	345	5.07%	23	0.34%	2,208	32.44%	6,806
Washburn	281	60.43%	137	29.46%	47	10.11%	0	0.00%	144	30.97%	465
Washington	1,583	34.45%	2,972	64.68%	18	0.39%	22	0.48%	-1,389	-30.23%	4,595
Waukesha	3,207	47.17%	3,264	48.01%	263	3.87%	65	0.96%	-57	-0.84%	6,799
Waupaca	3,032	59.69%	1,792	35.28%	92	1.81%	163	3.21%	1,240	24.41%	5,080
Waushara	2,146	74.72%	605	21.07%	85	2.96%	36	1.25%	1,541	53.66%	2,872
Winnebago	4,893	47.91%	4,688	45.90%	341	3.34%	291	2.85%	205	2.01%	10,213
Wood	1,455	44.66%	1,699	52.15%	7	0.21%	97	2.98%	-244	-7.49%	3,258
Total	161,157	50.37%	146,477	45.78%	7,656	2.39%	4,598	1.44%	14,680	4.59%	319,951

==== Counties that flipped from Democratic to Republican ====
- Ashland
- Bayfield
- Chippewa
- Douglas
- Price

==== Counties that flipped from Republican to Democratic ====
- Dane
- Sheboygan
- Waukesha
- Wood

== See also ==
- United States presidential elections in Wisconsin
