= Barry Corner, Wisconsin =

- Unincorporated community
- Location within Wisconsin Location within the United States
- Coordinates: 44°31′05″N 92°10′47″W
- Country: United States
- State: Wisconsin
- County: Pepin
- Elevation: 1,181 ft (360 m)
- Time zone: UTC-6 (Central (CST))
  - Summer (DST): UTC-5 (CDT)
- Area codes: 715 & 534
- GNIS feature ID: 1577505

Barry Corner is an unincorporated community located in the town of Pepin, Pepin County, Wisconsin, United States. Barry Corner is located at the junction of County Highways I and CC and Bogus Road, 6.7 miles (10.8 km) north-northwest of the Pepin Village Hall in the village of Pepin. Currently, the northeast and southwest quadrants have farm houses on them, while the northwest and southeast quadrants are crop fields.

The area is named after nineteenth-century teacher Anna Barry, who taught in the one-room-schoolhouse that would become known as Barry Corner School. The site of the schoolhouse is located on County Road I, within one mile of the CC/Bogus intersection.
