= National Register of Historic Places listings in Pepin County, Wisconsin =

Location of Pepin County in Wisconsin

This is a list of the National Register of Historic Places listings in Pepin County, Wisconsin. It is intended to provide a comprehensive listing of entries in the National Register of Historic Places that are located in Pepin County, Wisconsin. The locations of National Register properties for which the latitude and longitude coordinates are included below may be seen in a map.

There are 2 properties and districts listed on the National Register in the county.

This National Park Service list is complete through NPS recent listings posted March 21, 2025.

== Current listings ==
	Name on the Register	Image	Date listed	Location	City or town	Description
1	Durand Free Library	Durand Free Library	February 20, 1980 (#80000173)	315 West Second Avenue; 44°37′40″N 91°58′00″W	Durand	Durand's library began above a feed store in 1886. The current Tudor-styled building was built starting in 1907, with a Carnegie grant and local limestone.
2	Pepin County Courthouse and Jail	Pepin County Courthouse and Jail	March 9, 1982 (#82000695)	307 West Madison; 44°37′44″N 91°57′53″W	Durand	1874 wood-framed Greek Revival building where a man was once lynched. Now a museum.

== See also ==
- List of National Historic Landmarks in Wisconsin
- National Register of Historic Places listings in Wisconsin
- Listings in neighboring counties: Buffalo, Dunn, Eau Claire, Goodhue (MN), Pierce, Wabasha (MN)
