= Devils Corner, Wisconsin =

- Unincorporated community
- Location within Wisconsin Location within the United States
- Coordinates: 44°30′39″N 92°08′07″W
- Country: United States
- State: Wisconsin
- County: Pepin
- Elevation: 1,142 ft (348 m)
- Time zone: UTC-6 (Central (CST))
  - Summer (DST): UTC-5 (CDT)
- Area codes: 715 & 534
- GNIS feature ID: 1577569

Devils Corner is an unincorporated community located in the town of Pepin, Pepin County, Wisconsin, United States. Devils Corner is located on County Highway I, 5 miles (8.0 km) north of the village of Pepin.
