= Wisconsin Highway 183 =

State highway in Wisconsin, United States

State Trunk Highway 183

Route information
- Length: 30.8 mi (49.6 km)

Major junctions
- South end: WIS 35 near Pepin
- North end: WIS 29 near Spring Valley

Location
- Country: United States
- State: Wisconsin
- Counties: Pepin, Pierce

Highway system
- Wisconsin State Trunk Highway System; Interstate; US; State; Scenic; Rustic
← WIS 182	→ WIS 184

State Trunk Highway 183 (often called Highway 183, STH-183 or WIS 183) was a state highway in the U.S. state of Wisconsin. It ran north–south between WIS 35 near Pepin and WIS 29 near Spring Valley. The now-decommissioned highway was turned over to local control, and is now designated as County Trunk Highway CC (CTH-CC) in Pepin and Pierce counties.

== Route description ==
Sites along the route, from south to north, include the Little House Wayside and the unincorporated communities of Lund (on the border between Pepin and Pierce counties, at the highway's junctions with CTH-J and CTH-SS), Ono (at the junction with US Highway 10, US 10), Waverly (at the junction with WIS 72), and Olivet (on the boundary between the Pierce County towns of Gilman and Spring Lake). The terminus at WIS 29 is very close to the entry to Crystal Cave, about 1-mile (1.6 km) southwest along Burkart Creek (a tributary of the Eau Galle River), from Spring Valley.

== History ==
Highway 183 was first designated in 1947 from Spring Valley to US Highway 10. It was extended south to Pepin in 1949. The highway was given to local control around 1989.

== Major intersections ==
County	Location	mi	km	Destinations	Notes
Pepin	Pepin			WIS 35 – Pepin, Stockholm, Maiden Rock	
Pierce	Ono			US 10 – Plum City, Ellsworth	
Pierce	Waverly			WIS 72 – Elmwood, Ellsworth	
Pierce	Spring Valley			WIS 29	
1.000 mi = 1.609 km; 1.000 km = 0.621 mi
