= 1944 United States presidential election in Wisconsin =

- November 7, 1944

Nominee	Thomas E. Dewey	Franklin D. Roosevelt
Party	Republican	Democratic
Home state	New York	New York
Running mate	John W. Bricker	Harry S. Truman
Electoral vote	12	0
Popular vote	674,532	650,413
Percentage	50.37%	48.57%
County results
Dewey
40–50%
50–60%
60–70%
70–80%
Roosevelt
40–50%
50–60%
60–70%
President before election
Franklin D. Roosevelt
Democratic
Elected President
Franklin D. Roosevelt
Democratic

The 1944 United States presidential election in Wisconsin was held on November 7, 1944, as part of the 1944 United States presidential election. State voters chose 12 electors to the Electoral College, who voted for president and vice president.

Politics in Wisconsin since the Populist movement had been dominated by the Republican Party. The Democratic Party had been uncompetitive outside certain eastern German as the upper classes, along with the majority of workers who followed them, fled from William Jennings Bryan's agrarian and free silver sympathies. Although the state did develop a strong Social-Democratic Party to provide opposition to the GOP, Wisconsin developed the direct Republican primary in 1903 and this ultimately created competition between the "League" under Robert M. La Follette, and the conservative "Regular" faction. This ultimately would develop into the Wisconsin Progressive Party in the late 1930s, which was opposed to the conservative German Democrats and to the national Republican Party, and allied with Franklin D. Roosevelt at the federal level.

During the 1940 presidential election, fought whilst the United States was still neutral in World War II, the conservative German counties, especially the "WOW counties" near Milwaukee and other counties along the Lake Michigan coast, turned abruptly away from Roosevelt. These counties viewed Russian Communism as a much greater threat to America than German Nazism, and believed Roosevelt offered too much aid to Britain and France. The result was that the historically Democratic German Catholic counties like Kewaunee and Calumet rivalled longtime GOP bastions like Waupaca and Waushara Counties as the most Republican in the state, and GOP nominee Wendell Willkie came within two points of carrying the state after Alf Landon had lost by two-to-one four years earlier.

Early Gallup polls in August showed Republican nominee Thomas E. Dewey leading Roosevelt in Wisconsin by as much as twelve percentage points at the end of the second week of that month. The fact that the state's disintegrating Progressive Party was divided on whether to support Roosevelt did nothing to help the President, neither did Dewey's claim that Roosevelt had close ties to Communists at home and abroad.

Although wartime conditions limited campaigning in the state by the two Dutchess County natives, by mid-October polls had not changed from where they were two months previously. At that time Governor Dewey visited Milwaukee on a rail trip to Minneapolis, and more detailed opinion polls later in October said that powerful isolationist sentiment in rural Wisconsin and tighter unity of his opposition would ensure that Roosevelt had little hope of holding the state.

Ultimately Dewey carried Wisconsin as polls had predicted he would, although by a substantially smaller margin of just 1.80 percentage points. Continuing trends in Third Party System Democratic counties around Green Bay and Appleton proved decisive in tipping the state, as Dewey tightened Willkie gains that would not be substantially reversed in the ensuing eighty years: even during Lyndon B. Johnson's 1964 landslide, Republican Barry Goldwater did much better in this area than he did nationally.

This was the first election in which Forest County and Vilas County did not vote for the eventual winner in Wisconsin. Ashland County also saw its state bellwether streak broken for the first time since 1884. Starting with this election, Buffalo County and Trempealeau County would back the statewide winner in every election until 2020 and Barron County would do the same until 2000.

== Results ==
1944 United States presidential election in Wisconsin
Party	Candidate	Votes	Percentage	Electoral votes
Republican	Thomas E. Dewey	674,532	50.37%	12
Democratic	Franklin D. Roosevelt (incumbent)	650,413	48.57%	0
Social-Democratic	Norman Thomas	13,205	0.99%	0
Socialist Labor (Note: Was listed as "Independent Socialist Labor" in Wisconsin)	Edward A. Teichert	1,002	0.07%	0
Totals		1,339,152	100.00%	12

=== Results by county ===
County	Thomas E. Dewey Republican		Franklin D. Roosevelt Democratic		Norman Thomas Social-Democratic		Edward A. Teichert Socialist Labor		Margin		Total votes cast
County	#	%	#	%	#	%	#	%	#	%	Total votes cast
Adams	1,579	51.40%	1,478	48.11%	10	0.33%	5	0.16%	101	3.29%	3,072
Ashland	3,183	40.60%	4,609	58.80%	42	0.54%	5	0.06%	-1,426	-18.19%	7,839
Barron	7,137	55.66%	5,585	43.55%	92	0.72%	9	0.07%	1,552	12.10%	12,823
Bayfield	2,475	42.02%	3,362	57.08%	48	0.81%	5	0.08%	-887	-15.06%	5,890
Brown	17,762	50.14%	17,576	49.61%	76	0.21%	12	0.03%	186	0.53%	35,426
Buffalo	3,416	63.19%	1,948	36.03%	39	0.72%	3	0.06%	1,468	27.16%	5,406
Burnett	2,119	52.72%	1,868	46.48%	26	0.65%	6	0.15%	251	6.25%	4,019
Calumet	5,611	73.58%	1,966	25.78%	46	0.60%	3	0.04%	3,645	47.80%	7,626
Chippewa	7,691	53.59%	6,567	45.76%	77	0.54%	16	0.11%	1,124	7.83%	14,351
Clark	7,948	62.80%	4,612	36.44%	89	0.70%	8	0.06%	3,336	26.36%	12,657
Columbia	7,867	56.50%	5,997	43.07%	55	0.40%	5	0.04%	1,870	13.43%	13,924
Crawford	4,199	57.12%	3,130	42.58%	21	0.29%	1	0.01%	1,069	14.54%	7,351
Dane	23,021	37.96%	37,076	61.13%	530	0.87%	24	0.04%	-14,055	-23.17%	60,651
Dodge	14,102	64.44%	7,667	35.04%	102	0.47%	12	0.05%	6,435	29.41%	21,883
Door	5,668	68.25%	2,599	31.29%	30	0.36%	8	0.10%	3,069	36.95%	8,305
Douglas	7,132	35.20%	12,985	64.08%	134	0.66%	12	0.06%	-5,853	-28.89%	20,263
Dunn	5,980	60.37%	3,853	38.90%	69	0.70%	3	0.03%	2,127	21.47%	9,905
Eau Claire	9,470	51.13%	8,962	48.39%	86	0.46%	2	0.01%	508	2.74%	18,520
Florence	765	45.59%	897	53.46%	15	0.89%	1	0.06%	-132	-7.87%	1,678
Fond du Lac	16,785	63.81%	9,378	35.65%	128	0.49%	15	0.06%	7,407	28.16%	26,306
Forest	1,391	36.22%	2,436	63.44%	10	0.26%	3	0.08%	-1,045	-27.21%	3,840
Grant	10,226	62.56%	6,091	37.27%	24	0.15%	4	0.02%	4,135	25.30%	16,345
Green	5,556	57.28%	4,101	42.28%	36	0.37%	6	0.06%	1,455	15.00%	9,699
Green Lake	4,571	67.38%	2,190	32.28%	17	0.25%	6	0.09%	2,381	35.10%	6,784
Iowa	4,608	56.00%	3,585	43.57%	30	0.36%	5	0.06%	1,023	12.43%	8,228
Iron	1,345	31.51%	2,894	67.81%	26	0.61%	3	0.07%	-1,549	-36.29%	4,268
Jackson	3,182	50.86%	3,040	48.59%	30	0.48%	4	0.06%	142	2.27%	6,256
Jefferson	10,245	59.16%	6,988	40.35%	76	0.44%	8	0.05%	3,257	18.81%	17,317
Juneau	4,733	61.97%	2,857	37.41%	42	0.55%	5	0.07%	1,876	24.56%	7,637
Kenosha	12,436	39.96%	18,325	58.88%	337	1.08%	23	0.07%	-5,889	-18.92%	31,121
Kewaunee	4,153	61.25%	2,611	38.51%	15	0.22%	1	0.01%	1,542	22.74%	6,780
La Crosse	12,784	50.93%	12,247	48.79%	65	0.26%	7	0.03%	537	2.14%	25,103
Lafayette	4,421	54.27%	3,696	45.37%	26	0.32%	4	0.05%	725	8.90%	8,147
Langlade	4,036	48.23%	4,310	51.50%	19	0.23%	4	0.05%	-274	-3.27%	8,369
Lincoln	5,564	64.71%	2,938	34.17%	78	0.91%	18	0.21%	2,626	30.54%	8,598
Manitowoc	14,047	53.52%	11,949	45.53%	217	0.83%	34	0.13%	2,098	7.99%	26,247
Marathon	15,782	53.54%	13,192	44.75%	484	1.64%	19	0.06%	2,590	8.79%	29,477
Marinette	7,159	52.21%	6,483	47.28%	59	0.43%	11	0.08%	676	4.93%	13,712
Marquette	2,853	73.47%	1,016	26.17%	14	0.36%	0	0.00%	1,837	47.31%	3,883
Milwaukee	142,448	40.15%	205,282	57.85%	6,705	1.89%	395	0.11%	-62,834	-17.71%	354,830
Monroe	7,277	64.09%	4,013	35.34%	61	0.54%	3	0.03%	3,264	28.75%	11,354
Oconto	5,923	57.38%	4,348	42.12%	45	0.44%	6	0.06%	1,575	15.26%	10,322
Oneida	3,253	44.06%	4,076	55.21%	53	0.72%	1	0.01%	-823	-11.15%	7,383
Outagamie	18,294	64.44%	9,955	35.07%	120	0.42%	20	0.07%	8,339	29.37%	28,389
Ozaukee	5,655	60.66%	3,579	38.39%	81	0.87%	8	0.09%	2,076	22.27%	9,323
Pepin	1,902	64.28%	1,029	34.78%	25	0.84%	3	0.10%	873	29.50%	2,959
Pierce	5,137	62.40%	3,033	36.84%	60	0.73%	3	0.04%	2,104	25.56%	8,233
Polk	5,329	53.58%	4,489	45.14%	121	1.22%	6	0.06%	840	8.45%	9,945
Portage	5,405	38.27%	8,678	61.44%	36	0.25%	6	0.04%	-3,273	-23.17%	14,125
Price	3,258	47.78%	3,515	51.55%	40	0.59%	6	0.09%	-257	-3.77%	6,819
Racine	18,220	41.11%	25,697	57.97%	390	0.88%	18	0.04%	-7,477	-16.87%	44,325
Richland	5,088	61.85%	3,109	37.79%	24	0.29%	5	0.06%	1,979	24.06%	8,226
Rock	18,477	52.23%	16,766	47.39%	104	0.29%	29	0.08%	1,711	4.84%	35,376
Rusk	3,092	48.40%	3,238	50.69%	42	0.66%	16	0.25%	-146	-2.29%	6,388
Sauk	9,751	62.72%	5,690	36.60%	95	0.61%	10	0.06%	4,061	26.12%	15,546
Sawyer	2,421	55.02%	1,947	44.25%	26	0.59%	6	0.14%	474	10.77%	4,400
Shawano	8,732	68.16%	4,015	31.34%	57	0.44%	7	0.05%	4,717	36.82%	12,811
Sheboygan	15,291	49.42%	15,062	48.68%	557	1.80%	28	0.09%	229	0.74%	30,938
St. Croix	5,660	53.01%	4,930	46.17%	80	0.75%	8	0.07%	730	6.84%	10,678
Taylor	3,194	48.24%	3,215	48.56%	209	3.16%	3	0.05%	-21	-0.32%	6,621
Trempealeau	4,719	51.06%	4,496	48.65%	27	0.29%	0	0.00%	223	2.41%	9,242
Vernon	5,676	51.04%	5,409	48.64%	19	0.17%	17	0.15%	267	2.40%	11,121
Vilas	2,021	48.91%	2,079	50.31%	25	0.61%	7	0.17%	-58	-1.40%	4,132
Walworth	10,901	65.34%	5,696	34.14%	78	0.47%	8	0.05%	5,205	31.20%	16,683
Washburn	2,441	53.85%	2,059	45.42%	29	0.64%	4	0.09%	382	8.43%	4,533
Washington	8,921	69.44%	3,840	29.89%	77	0.60%	9	0.07%	5,081	39.55%	12,847
Waukesha	17,995	57.44%	13,038	41.62%	278	0.89%	15	0.05%	4,957	15.82%	31,326
Waupaca	11,495	74.44%	3,879	25.12%	63	0.41%	5	0.03%	7,616	49.32%	15,442
Waushara	4,675	75.54%	1,485	23.99%	27	0.44%	2	0.03%	3,190	51.54%	6,189
Winnebago	19,310	59.56%	12,841	39.61%	250	0.77%	19	0.06%	6,469	19.95%	32,420
Wood	9,569	57.92%	6,861	41.53%	81	0.49%	9	0.05%	2,708	16.39%	16,520
Totals	674,532	50.37%	650,413	48.57%	13,205	0.99%	1,002	0.07%	24,119	1.80%	1,339,152

==== Counties that flipped from Democratic to Republican ====
- Adams
- Brown
- Burnett
- Eau Claire
- Jackson
- Manitowoc
- Marinette
- Sheboygan
- Washburn

==== Counties that flipped from Republican to Democratic ====
- Florence

=== Electors ===
These were the names of the electors on each ticket.

Franklin D. Roosevelt & Harry S. Truman Democratic Party	Thomas E. Dewey & John W. Bricker Republican Party	Norman Thomas & Darlington Hoopes Social-Democratic Party	Edward A. Teichert & Arla A. Albaugh Socialist Labor Party
William McCauley; James Corcoran; Katherine Wenning; Jane Schultz; Albert Wolfe; Walter McGrath; Clem Kalvelage; Charles E. Broughton; John Lawrie; Frank Sturzl; Mary Quinn; Felix Idziorek	Melvin R. Laird; Arthur A. Lenroot Jr.; Edward F. Hilker; George Hartman; William R. Graves; Charles I. Wesley; Julius P. Heil; William J. Campbell; Julius Spearbraker; Frank P. Corelisen; Kenneth White; Carl V. Nelson	Edward Weston; Frank Lubinski; Arthur Swenson; Dorothy Bright; Arthur C. Ochsner; Christine Podjavorsek; Emil Brodde; Ferdinand Albertin; Herman Marth; Clinton B. Ballard; Olin Swenson; Henry Bergmann	Frank Brlas; Arnold Fortman; Marko Golubich; Robert Hofem; Jerry R. Kenyon; Anthony Kolosso; Louis Myler; Stephen Paschke; Sebastian Rack; Alex Schaufelberger Jr.; Walter E. Semrau; Arthur E. Wepfer

== See also ==
- United States presidential elections in Wisconsin
