= Little House Wayside =

Historical attraction in Wisconsin

Coordinates: 44.52681°N 92.19029°W

Exterior the first Ingalls house (October 2007)

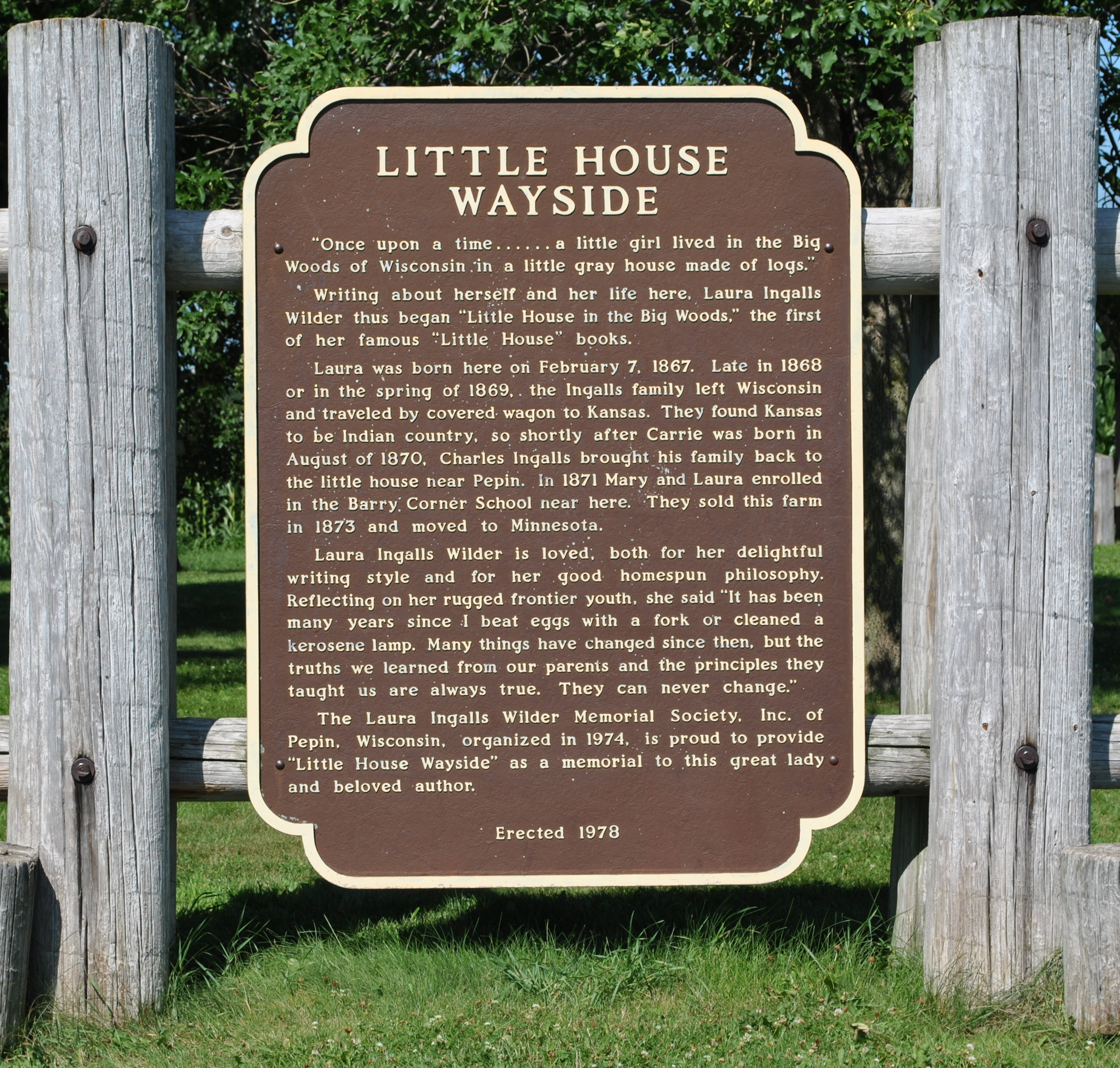
Historic Marker at the Little House Wayside

The Little House Wayside is a 3-acre (1.2 ha) rest area located in Pepin County, Wisconsin. It is approximately seven miles (11 km) northwest of Pepin, Wisconsin located in the town of Pepin and approximately one mile southeast of Lund on County Highway CC (formerly Wisconsin Highway 183). The Wayside is located on the plot where Laura Ingalls Wilder was born on February 7, 1867.

The site contains a replica of the house that was described in the book, Little House in the Big Woods. The unfurnished cabin contains a fireplace, two bedrooms, a loft, and information about Wilder and her family. The site is now surrounded by open farmland, although it was a dense hardwood forest when Wilder was born. The site is maintained by the Laura Ingalls Wilder Memorial Society. The house is closed for the winter after the snow gets deep.
