= Canute Anderson =

American politician (1830–1893)

Canute Anderson (April 14, 1830 – July 31, 1893) was a member of the Wisconsin State Assembly.

== Biography ==
Anderson was born on April 14, 1830, in Lærdal, Norway. In 1851, he moved to Sterling, Polk County, Wisconsin. In 1854, he moved to Burnett County, Wisconsin, where for several years he was the lone resident in that area. He married Catherine Nelson, an immigrant from Sweden. They had twelve children. Known as the "Father of Burnett County," Anderson established Grantsburg, Wisconsin. He died on July 31, 1893 after being struck in the head by a hay pole while stacking hay.

== Career ==
Anderson was a member of the Assembly in 1878 and 1883. In addition, he was Postmaster and Chairman of the Town Board of Grantsburg, Wisconsin, County Treasurer of Burnett County and a Presidential Elector in the 1884 United States presidential election. When he died, he was chairman (similar to mayor) of the joint townships of Grantsburg and Anderson, Burnett County, Wisconsin. He was a Republican.
