= Lima, Pepin County, Wisconsin =

Lima, Wisconsin
- Town
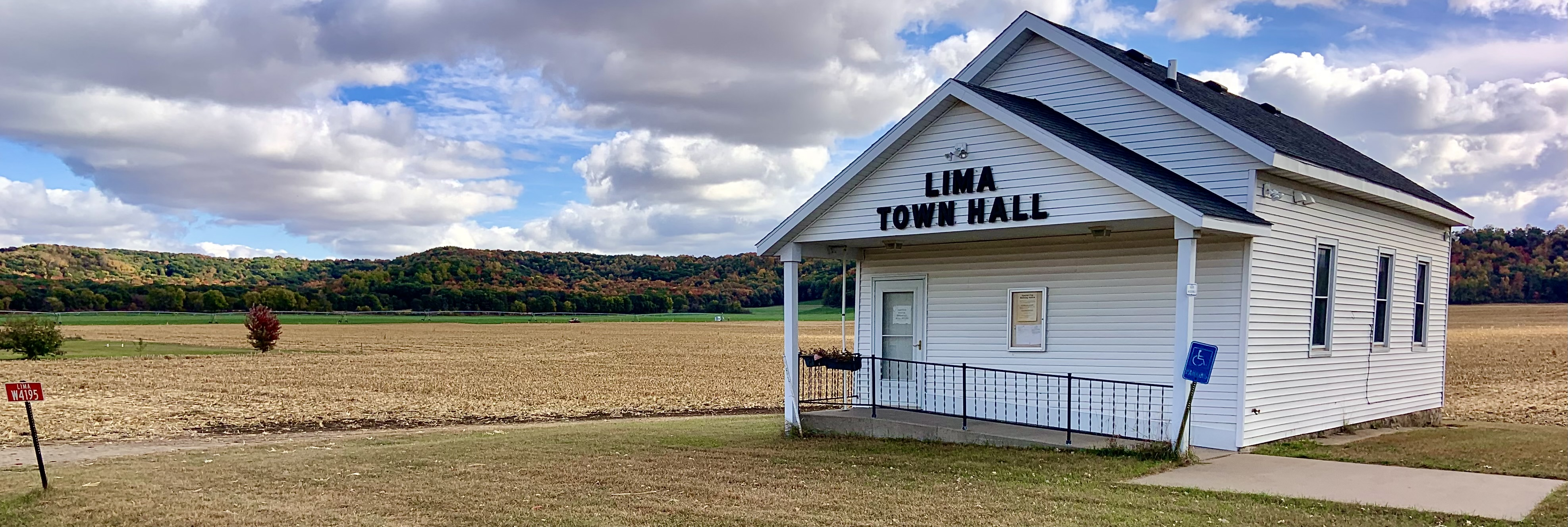
- Town hall

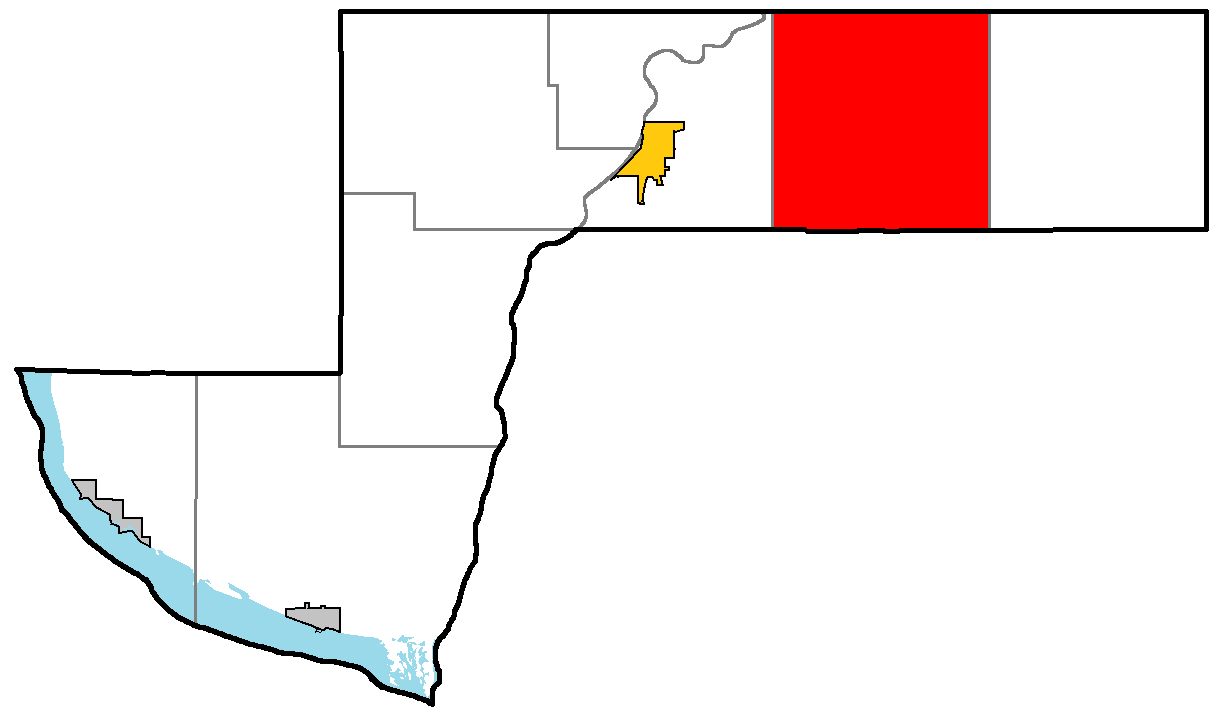
- Location of Lima, Pepin County, Wisconsin

- Location of Pepin County, Wisconsin
- Coordinates: 44°38′40″N 91°50′58″W
- Country: United States
- State: Wisconsin
- County: Pepin

Area
  - Total: 35.9 sq mi (93.0 km^{2})
  - Land: 35.9 sq mi (93.0 km^{2})
  - Water: 0 sq mi (0.0 km^{2})
- Elevation: 892 ft (272 m)

Population (2020)
  - Total: 693
  - Density: 19.3/sq mi (7.45/km^{2})
- Time zone: UTC-6 (Central (CST))
  - Summer (DST): UTC-5 (CDT)
- Area codes: 715 & 534
- FIPS code: 55-44075
- GNIS feature ID: 1583556

Lima (/ˈlaɪmə/ LY-mə) is a town in Pepin County, Wisconsin, United States. The population was 693 at the 2020 census. The unincorporated community of Tarrant is located in the town.

== Geography ==
According to the United States Census Bureau, the town has a total area of 35.9 square miles (93.0 km^{2}), of which 35.9 square miles (93.0 km^{2}) is land and 0.03% is water.

== Demographics ==
As of the census of 2000, there were 716 people, 221 households, and 182 families residing in the town. The population density was 19.9 people per square mile (7.7/km^{2}). There were 227 housing units at an average density of 6.3 per square mile (2.4/km^{2}). The racial makeup of the town was 99.44% White, 0.14% Native American, 0.14% Asian, 0.14% from other races, and 0.14% from two or more races. Hispanic or Latino of any race were 0.56% of the population.

There were 221 households, out of which 39.8% had children under the age of 18 living with them, 75.6% were married couples living together, 2.3% had a female householder with no husband present, and 17.6% were non-families. 14.0% of all households were made up of individuals, and 8.1% had someone living alone who was 65 years of age or older. The average household size was 3.24 and the average family size was 3.62.

In the town, the population was spread out, with 31.7% under the age of 18, 12.6% from 18 to 24, 24.3% from 25 to 44, 20.4% from 45 to 64, and 11.0% who were 65 years of age or older. The median age was 31 years. For every 100 females, there were 102.8 males. For every 100 females age 18 and over, there were 110.8 males.

The median income for a household in the town was $45,139, and the median income for a family was $50,625. Males had a median income of $31,053 versus $22,250 for females. The per capita income for the town was $18,334. About 5.9% of families and 12.2% of the population were below the poverty line, including 18.4% of those under age 18 and 10.4% of those age 65 or over.
