= Albany, Pepin County, Wisconsin =

Albany, Wisconsin
- Town
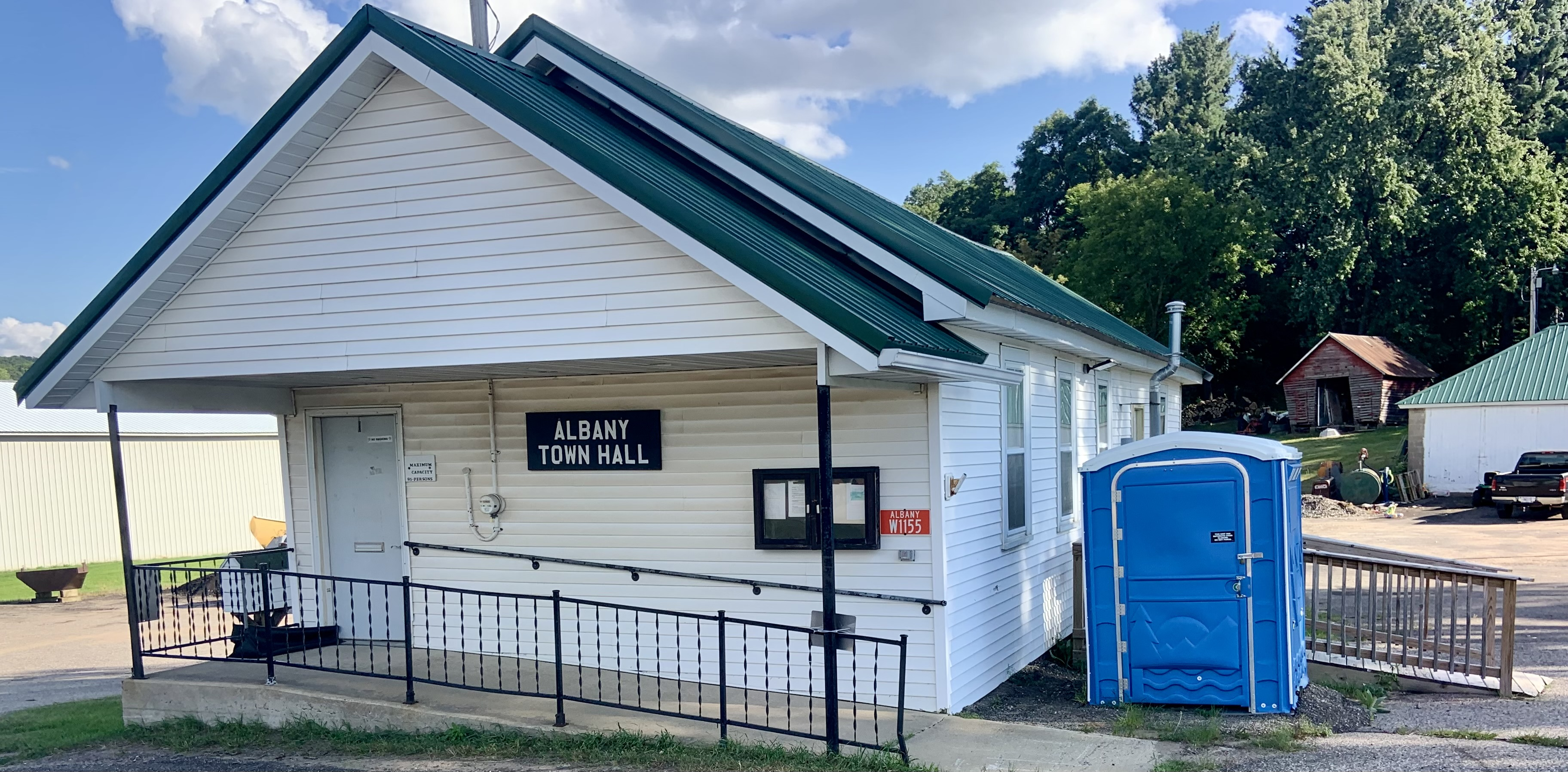
- Town hall

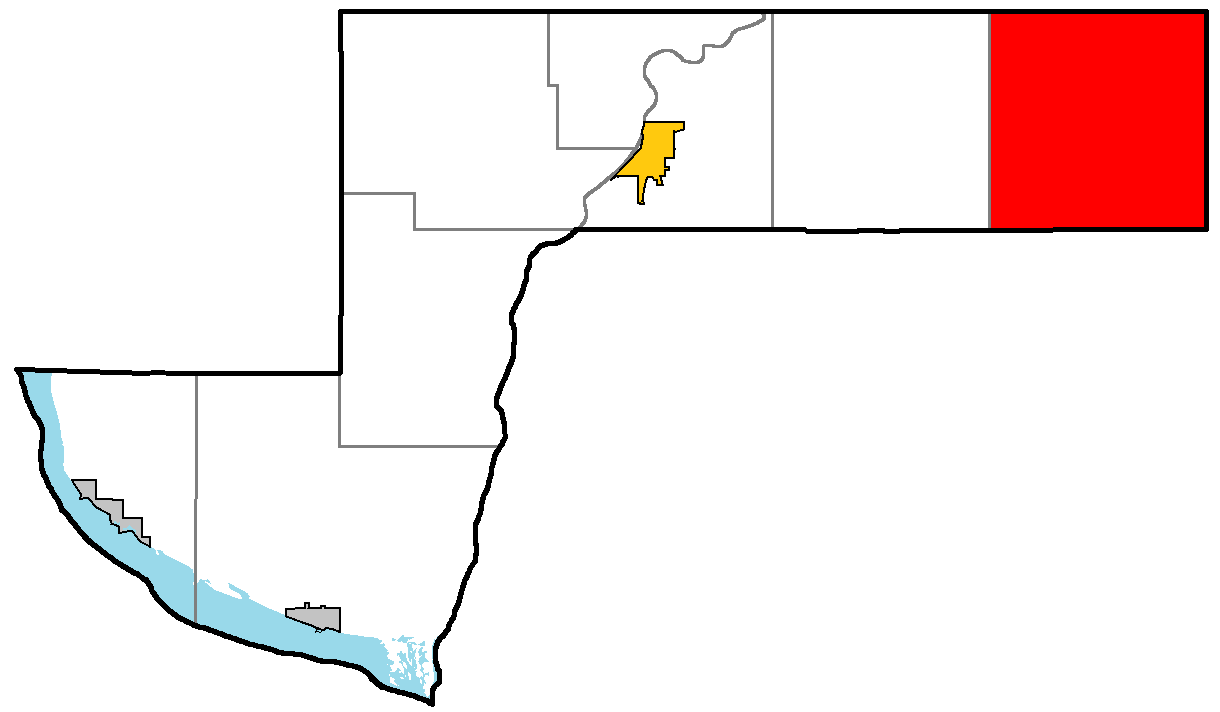
- Location of Albany, Pepin County, Wisconsin

- Location of Pepin County, Wisconsin
- Coordinates: 44°38′6″N 91°42′57″W
- Country: United States
- State: Wisconsin
- County: Pepin

Area
  - Total: 36.0 sq mi (93.3 km^{2})
  - Land: 36.0 sq mi (93.3 km^{2})
  - Water: 0 sq mi (0.0 km^{2})
- Elevation: 1,191 ft (363 m)

Population (2020)
  - Total: 716
  - Density: 19.9/sq mi (7.67/km^{2})
- Time zone: UTC-6 (Central (CST))
  - Summer (DST): UTC-5 (CDT)
- Area codes: 715 & 534
- FIPS code: 55-00800
- GNIS feature ID: 1582667

Albany (/ˈɔːlbəni/ AWL-bə-nee) is a town in Pepin County, Wisconsin, United States. The population was 716 at the 2020 census.

== Geography ==
According to the United States Census Bureau, the town has a total area of 36.0 square miles (93.3 km^{2}), all land.

== Demographics ==
As of the census of 2000, there were 620 people, 180 households, and 156 families residing in the town. The population density was 17.2 people per square mile (6.6/km^{2}). There were 189 housing units at an average density of 5.2 per square mile (2.0/km^{2}). The racial makeup of the town was 97.90% White, 0.32% Pacific Islander, 0.32% from other races, and 1.45% from two or more races. Hispanic or Latino of any race were 0.32% of the population.

There were 180 households, out of which 43.9% had children under the age of 18 living with them, 78.9% were married couples living together, 6.1% had a female householder with no husband present, and 12.8% were non-families. 10.0% of all households were made up of individuals, and 4.4% had someone living alone who was 65 years of age or older. The average household size was 3.44 and the average family size was 3.75.

In the town, the population was spread out, with 37.9% under the age of 18, 8.2% from 18 to 24, 26.5% from 25 to 44, 20.6% from 45 to 64, and 6.8% who were 65 years of age or older. The median age was 28 years. For every 100 females, there were 107.4 males. For every 100 females age 18 and over, there were 105.9 males.

The median income for a household in the town was $40,313, and the median income for a family was $41,375. Males had a median income of $26,023 versus $21,250 for females. The per capita income for the town was $13,012. About 14.6% of families and 25.9% of the population were below the poverty line, including 45.6% of those under age 18 and 6.5% of those age 65 or over.
