= Tarrant, Wisconsin =

- Unincorporated community
- Location within Wisconsin Location within the United States
- Coordinates: 44°35′48″N 91°50′36″W
- Country: United States
- State: Wisconsin
- County: Pepin
- Elevation: 820 ft (250 m)
- Time zone: UTC-6 (Central (CST))
  - Summer (DST): UTC-5 (CDT)
- Area codes: 715 & 534
- GNIS feature ID: 1577850

Tarrant (/ˈtærənt/ TARR-ənt) is an unincorporated community located in the town of Lima, Pepin County, Wisconsin, United States. Tarrant is 6.5 miles (10.5 km) east-southeast of Durand. The community was named for the Tarrant family, who built a creamery in the area.
