= Silver Lake (Kingsbury County, South Dakota) =

Lake in the state of South Dakota, United States

- Location within South Dakota
- Interactive map of Silver Lake
- Location: Kingsbury County, South Dakota
- Coordinates: 44°22′54″N 97°31′18.1″W
- Type: Reclaimed glacial lake
- Part of: Madison Wetland Management District
- Basin countries: United States
- Surface area: 45 acres (18 ha)
- Surface elevation: 1,693 feet (516 m)
- Settlements: De Smet, South Dakota

Silver Lake is a glacial lake, later a reclaimed lake, located immediately east of De Smet, on the north side of U.S. Highway 14. Big Slough is a marsh at the southwest end of the lake.

== History ==
Silver Lake and Big Slough were written about extensively by Laura Ingalls Wilder in her novel By the Shores of Silver Lake. Caroline Ingalls named the lake for the silvery appearance of its surface. The Ingalls home (currently, a museum) and Surveyor's House are very close to it. The lake is a "prairie pothole," a depression in which rain and snow-melt collect without any outlet to regulate its level. A drainage ditch to nearby Lake Henry was built in the 1920s with the support of local land owners to prevent the lake from fluctuating and flooding the surrounding land. The dry lakebed was used as a rubbish dump, although a portion of the lake has since filled again with water.

A concrete walking path to the area of the lake was built in 2008 to allow visitors to DeSmet to experience it. As of 2023, an observation tower near Silver Lake is being constructed with the aid of the National Park Service and various local agencies to allow tourists to better observe the landscape described in Wilder's books. As of 2022, planning was underway for the construction of additional hiking trails and boardwalks in Big Slough.
