= Pepin County Courthouse and Jail =

- U.S. National Register of Historic Places
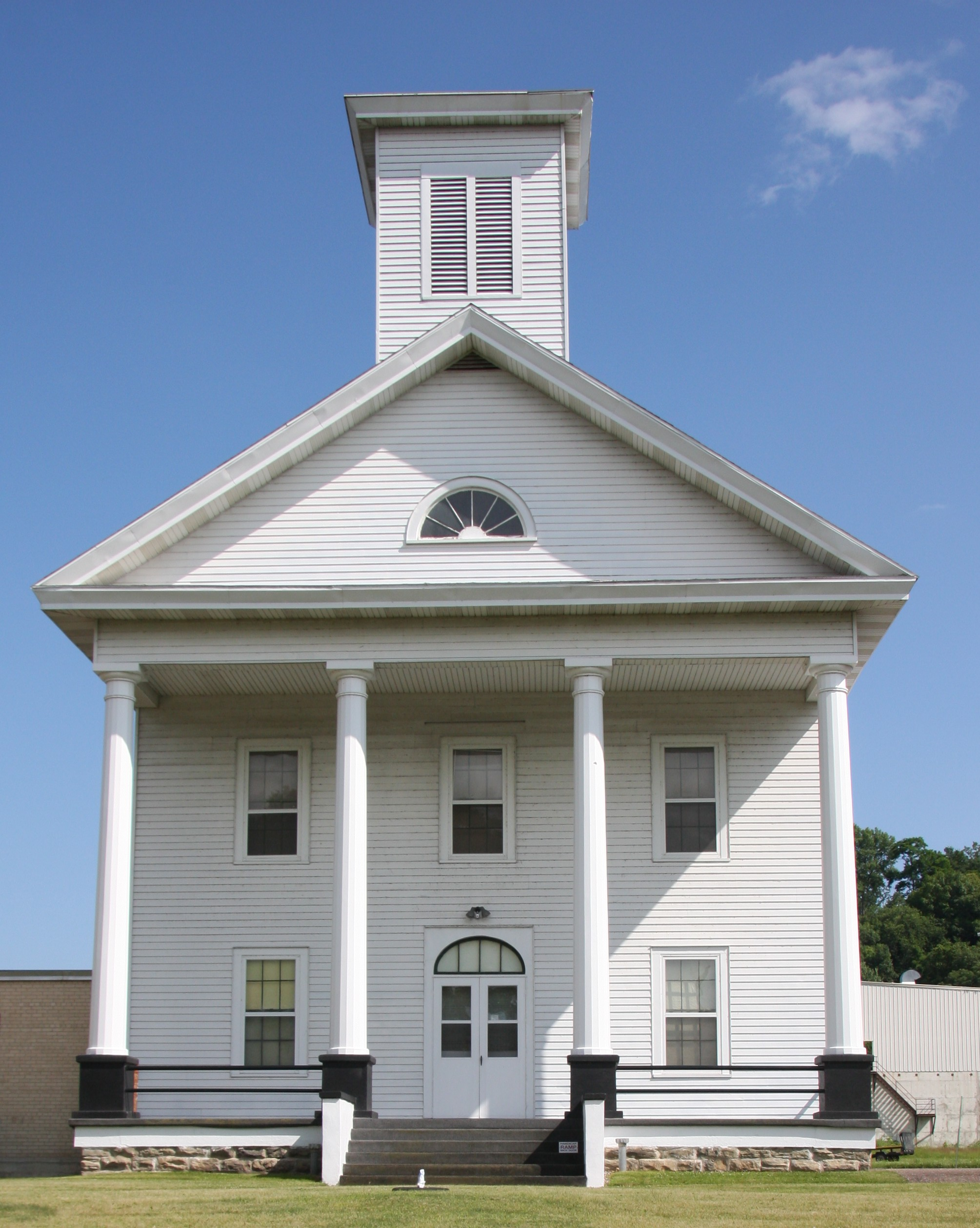

- Location within Wisconsin Location within the United States
- Interactive map showing the location for Pepin County Courthouse and Jail
- Location: 307 W. Madison, Durand, Wisconsin
- Coordinates: 44°37′44″N 91°57′53″W
- Area: 1.3 acres (0.53 ha)
- Built: 1873–74
- Architectural style: Greek Revival
- MPS: County Courthouses of Wisconsin TR
- NRHP reference No.: 82000695
- Added to NRHP: March 9, 1982

The Pepin County Courthouse and Jail is located in Durand, Wisconsin. In 1982, the site was added to the National Register of Historic Places. Additionally, it is listed on the Wisconsin State Register of Historic Places.

== Use ==
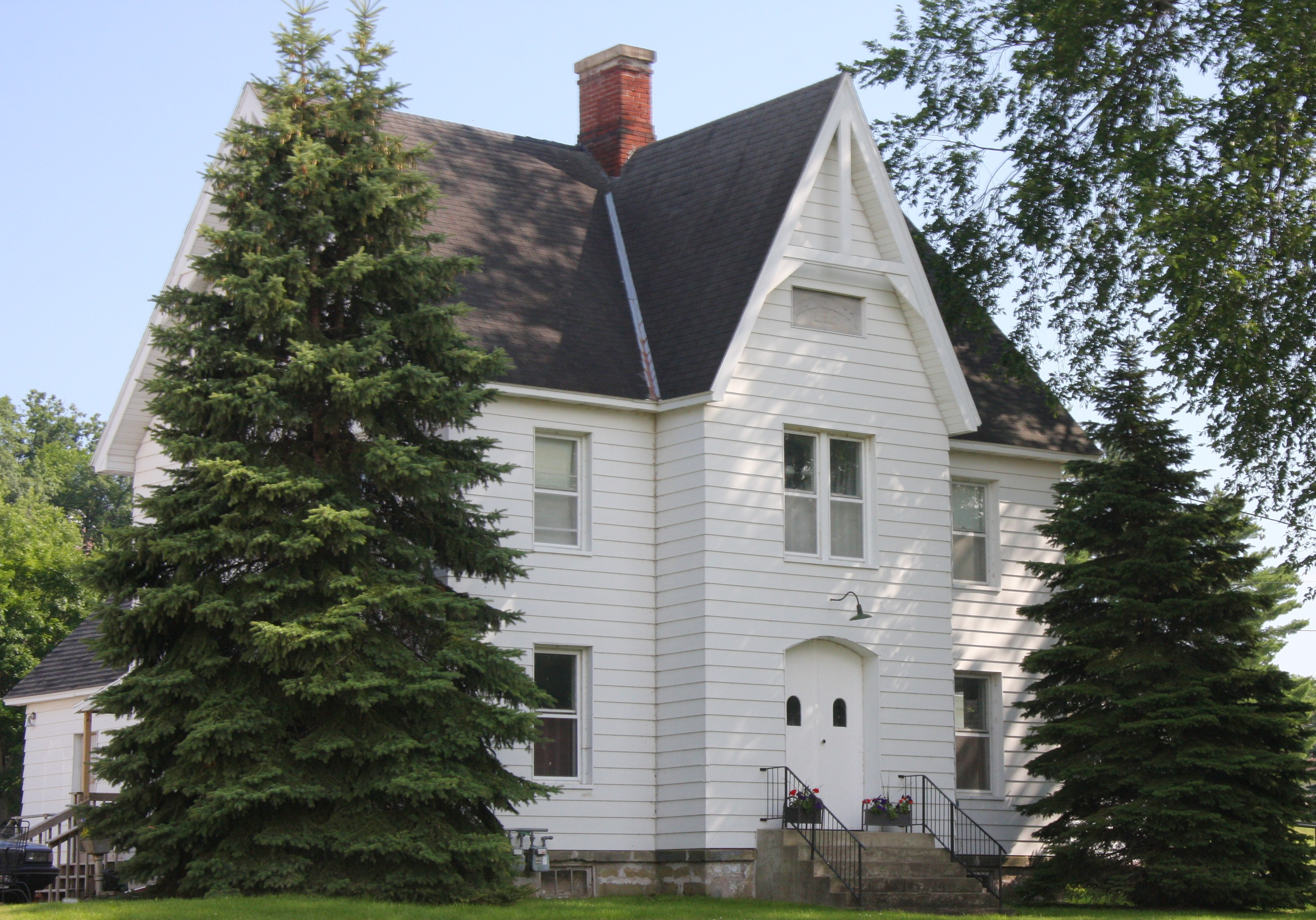
The old jail is in the back of this sheriff's residence.

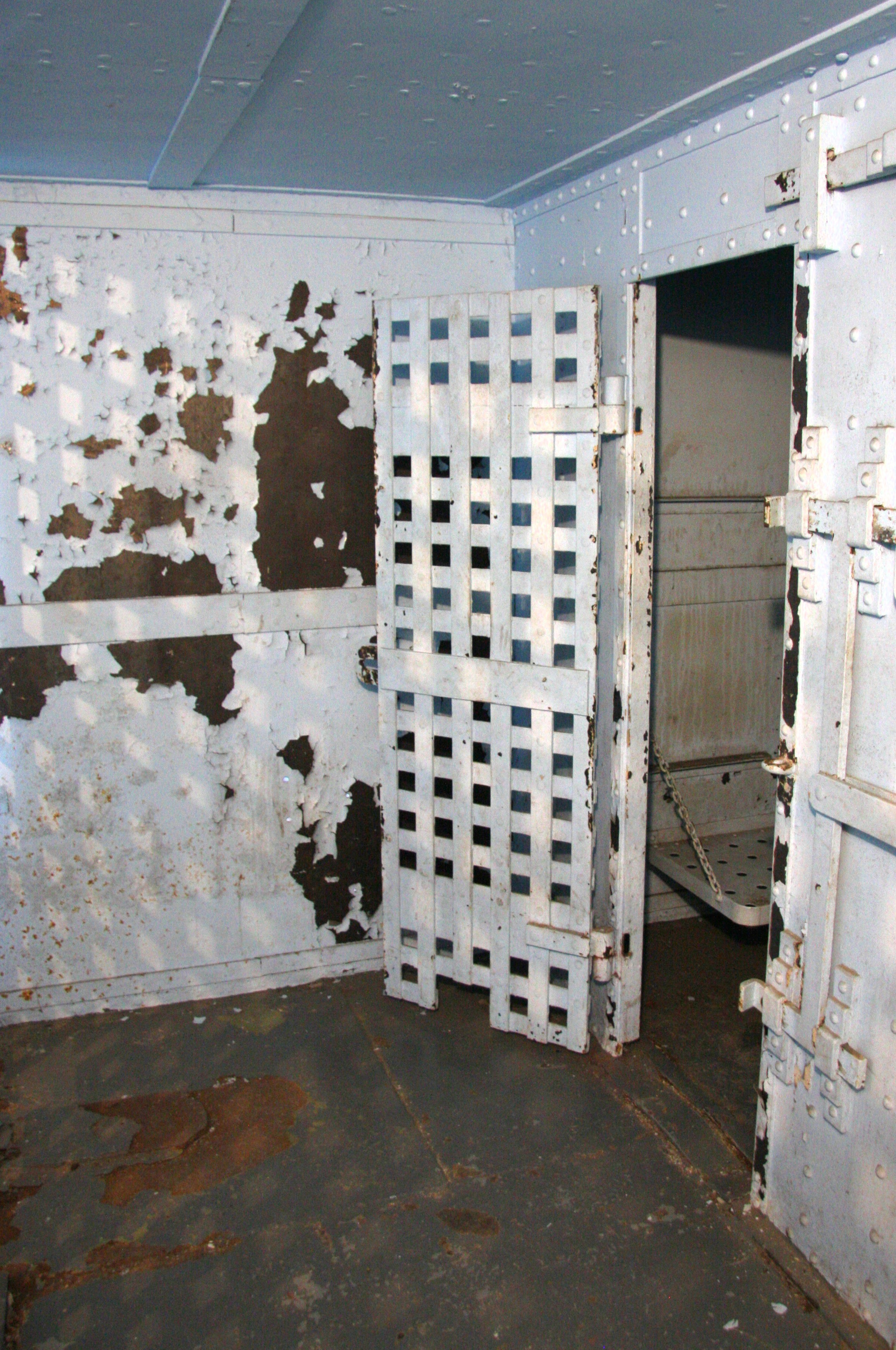
A cell in the old jail

The courthouse was constructed from 1873 to 1874 at a cost of $7,000, with the jail built next door. Attached to the jail was the official residence of the Sheriff of Pepin County, Wisconsin. In 1881, the site managed to survive a fire that cause great damage to the town. The jail and sheriff's residence remained in use until 1984, while the courthouse remained in use until 1985.

=== Pepin County Heritage Center ===
Currently, the property serves as the Pepin County Heritage Center, which is operated by the Pepin County Historical Society. Exhibits include the courtroom, jail, and displays of local history and culture.

== 1881 hanging incident ==
In 1881, a man who had been associated with Quantrill's Raiders and the James-Younger Gang was arrested in Durand for the murder of a sheriff's deputy. On the day of his trial at the courthouse, a mob descended upon the area, taking custody of the man and later hanging him.

The event was reported in the St. Paul Pioneer Press and The New York Times, causing Durand to gain a reputation of a "hanging town". However, it was later reported that most individuals involved in the hanging had come to the town from other areas. It was the last hanging in Wisconsin.
