= Lund, Wisconsin =

- Unincorporated community
- Location within Wisconsin Location within the United States
- Coordinates: 44°32′23″N 92°12′22″W
- Country: United States
- State: Wisconsin
- County: Pepin, Pierce
- Elevation: 1,138 ft (347 m)
- Time zone: UTC-6 (Central (CST))
  - Summer (DST): UTC-5 (CDT)
- Area codes: 715 & 534
- GNIS feature ID: 1568805

Pierce County

Pepin County

Lund is an unincorporated community located in two counties of the U.S. state of Wisconsin. The community lies on the county line between Pepin County, in the town of Pepin, and Pierce County, in the town of Maiden Rock, in central western Wisconsin, along the junctions of County Trunk Highway SS (CTH-SS), CTH-CC(formerly WIS 183), and CTH-J. Lund is approximately nine miles northwest of Pepin and six miles northeast of Stockholm, Wisconsin.

== History ==
The community was named after Lund, Sweden.

The birthplace of Laura Ingalls Wilder, romanticized in her book Little House in the Big Woods, is about one mile southeast of Lund, and is commemorated at the nearby Little House Wayside.
