= 1940 United States presidential election in Wisconsin =

- November 5, 1940

Nominee	Franklin D. Roosevelt	Wendell Willkie
Party	Democratic	Republican
Home state	New York	New York
Running mate	Henry A. Wallace	Charles L. McNary
Electoral vote	12	0
Popular vote	704,821	679,206
Percentage	50.15%	48.32%
County results
Roosevelt
40–50%
50–60%
60–70%
Willkie
50–60%
60–70%
70–80%
President before election
Franklin D. Roosevelt
Democratic
Elected President
Franklin D. Roosevelt
Democratic

The 1940 United States presidential election in Wisconsin was held on November 5, 1940, as part of the 1940 United States presidential election. State voters chose 12 electors to the Electoral College, who voted for president and vice president.

Politics in Wisconsin since the Populist movement had been dominated by the Republican Party. The Democratic Party had been uncompetitive outside certain eastern German areas, as the upper classes, along with the majority of workers who followed them, fled from William Jennings Bryan’s agrarian and free silver sympathies. Although the state did develop a strong Social-Democratic Party to provide opposition to the GOP, Wisconsin developed the direct Republican primary in 1903 and this ultimately created competition between the “League” under Robert M. La Follette, and the conservative “Regular” faction. This ultimately would develop into the Wisconsin Progressive Party in the late 1930s, which was opposed to the conservative German Democrats and to the national Republican Party, and allied with Franklin D. Roosevelt at the federal level.

In 1936, despite continuing Democratic gains in industrial and urban areas, German Catholic areas of Wisconsin gave substantial support to Union Party candidate William Lemke due to his support for rigid isolationism. When the next presidential election came, the Progressive Party had lost ground in 1938 but World War II had divided the country deeply on ethnic lines. Germans – especially German Catholics – and Irish Catholics believed Communism in the shape of Stalinist Russia was a much greater danger to the United States than Nazism and that the United States should not aid Britain and France, whereas the British and French, bound by ties to their homeland, were strongly in favor of such aid.

Republican nominee Willkie visited Wisconsin in his campaign in September, saying change was needed to make the American political system work. By late September opinion polls suggested he had the edge over Roosevelt in the state. Even as some other states of the Midwest moved towards President Roosevelt, Wisconsin was still seen as likely to go to Willkie as Senator Robert M. La Follette Jr. strongly opposed war aid to Britain and France. A Gallup poll four days before voting showed Willkie still ahead but falling.

In the end, however, unlike in Iowa, Michigan and Indiana, Roosevelt's gains proved enough to pass Willkie, and he carried Wisconsin, although by a massively reduced margin compared to 1932 and 1936. Whereas Alf Landon had carried only four of Wisconsin's seventy-one counties, Willkie carried forty-two. Most significantly, Willkie established the historically German “WOW counties” surrounding Milwaukee as reliable GOP strongholds that as of 2024 have not voted Democratic since except during Lyndon B. Johnson's landslide in 1964. Roosevelt's win was due to his seventy-eight-thousand vote plurality in Milwaukee County, and to maintaining his strength in the unionized, Scandinavian-American northwest.

Several long bellwether streaks for Wisconsin counties were broken in this election. Most notably, this was the first time Green Lake ever voted for the losing candidate in Wisconsin. Other notable broken streaks include Iowa County voting for the statewide loser for the first time since 1864, Chippewa County voting for the statewide loser for the first time since 1880, and Shawano County voting for the statewide loser for the first time since 1884.

This is the fourth most recent election in which Wisconsin voted for a different candidate than neighboring Iowa, a phenomenon that has only been repeated in 1976, 2004, and 2020.

== Results ==
1940 United States presidential election in Wisconsin
Party	Candidate	Votes	Percentage	Electoral votes
Democratic	Franklin D. Roosevelt (incumbent)	704,821	50.15%	12
Republican	Wendell Willkie	679,206	48.32%	0
Social-Democratic (Note: Was listed as "Independent Socialist" in Wisconsin)	Norman Thomas	15,071	1.07%	0
Communist (Note: Was listed as "Independent Communist" in Wisconsin)	Earl R. Browder	2,394	0.17%	0
Prohibition (Note: Was listed as "Independent Prohibition" in Wisconsin)	Roger W. Babson	2,148	0.15%	0
Socialist Labor (Note: Was listed as "Independent Socialist Labor" in Wisconsin)	John W. Aiken	1,882	0.13%	0
Write-in	Scattering (Note: The Scattering votes are not listed in the 1942 Blue Book)	18	0.00%	0
Totals		1,405,540	100.00%	12

=== Results by county ===
County	Franklin D. Roosevelt Democratic		Wendell Willkie Republican		Norman Thomas Social-Democratic		Other candidates Various parties		Margin		Total votes cast
County	#	%	#	%	#	%	#	%	#	%	Total votes cast
Adams	1,883	50.48%	1,818	48.74%	16	0.43%	13	0.35%	65	1.74%	3,730
Ashland	5,586	60.01%	3,592	38.59%	29	0.31%	102	1.10%	1,994	21.42%	9,309
Barron	6,183	43.46%	7,806	54.87%	107	0.75%	131	0.92%	-1,623	-11.41%	14,227
Bayfield	4,387	59.75%	2,829	38.53%	52	0.71%	74	1.01%	1,558	21.22%	7,342
Brown	19,526	54.18%	16,379	45.45%	78	0.22%	57	0.16%	3,147	8.73%	36,040
Buffalo	2,516	37.69%	4,056	60.76%	74	1.11%	29	0.43%	-1,540	-23.07%	6,675
Burnett	2,513	49.23%	2,510	49.17%	50	0.98%	32	0.63%	3	0.06%	5,105
Calumet	2,324	30.08%	5,327	68.96%	51	0.66%	23	0.30%	-3,003	-38.87%	7,725
Chippewa	7,250	44.83%	8,781	54.30%	72	0.45%	68	0.42%	-1,531	-9.47%	16,171
Clark	4,683	32.48%	9,501	65.89%	118	0.82%	118	0.82%	-4,818	-33.41%	14,420
Columbia	7,021	45.63%	8,260	53.68%	52	0.34%	54	0.35%	-1,239	-8.05%	15,387
Crawford	3,595	43.35%	4,667	56.28%	8	0.10%	23	0.28%	-1,072	-12.93%	8,293
Dane	40,331	64.23%	21,845	34.79%	409	0.65%	202	0.32%	18,486	29.44%	62,787
Dodge	8,938	37.48%	14,651	61.43%	174	0.73%	86	0.36%	-5,713	-23.95%	23,849
Door	2,750	33.29%	5,461	66.11%	28	0.34%	21	0.25%	-2,711	-32.82%	8,260
Douglas	15,548	66.12%	7,695	32.72%	122	0.52%	150	0.64%	7,853	33.40%	23,515
Dunn	4,545	39.05%	6,968	59.87%	61	0.52%	65	0.56%	-2,423	-20.82%	11,639
Eau Claire	10,129	51.07%	9,595	48.38%	48	0.24%	60	0.30%	534	2.69%	19,832
Florence	980	48.73%	1,008	50.12%	12	0.60%	11	0.55%	-28	-1.39%	2,011
Fond du Lac	10,323	37.76%	16,804	61.46%	124	0.45%	91	0.33%	-6,481	-23.70%	27,342
Forest	2,951	63.61%	1,672	36.04%	1	0.02%	15	0.32%	1,279	27.57%	4,639
Grant	7,458	39.76%	11,143	59.40%	46	0.25%	112	0.60%	-3,685	-19.64%	18,759
Green	4,565	44.05%	5,711	55.10%	48	0.46%	40	0.39%	-1,146	-11.06%	10,364
Green Lake	2,357	32.23%	4,919	67.25%	9	0.12%	29	0.40%	-2,562	-35.03%	7,314
Iowa	4,025	44.04%	4,978	54.46%	22	0.24%	115	1.26%	-953	-10.43%	9,140
Iron	3,525	66.90%	1,672	31.73%	24	0.46%	48	0.91%	1,853	35.17%	5,269
Jackson	3,975	51.09%	3,741	48.08%	26	0.33%	38	0.49%	234	3.01%	7,780
Jefferson	7,842	43.16%	10,178	56.02%	93	0.51%	56	0.31%	-2,336	-12.86%	18,169
Juneau	3,554	39.91%	5,268	59.15%	54	0.61%	30	0.34%	-1,714	-19.25%	8,906
Kenosha	17,174	57.68%	12,182	40.91%	262	0.88%	159	0.53%	4,992	16.76%	29,777
Kewaunee	3,389	46.60%	3,862	53.10%	11	0.15%	11	0.15%	-473	-6.50%	7,273
La Crosse	13,079	48.58%	13,711	50.92%	72	0.27%	62	0.23%	-632	-2.35%	26,924
Lafayette	4,315	45.81%	5,059	53.71%	23	0.24%	22	0.23%	-744	-7.90%	9,419
Langlade	5,190	52.88%	4,523	46.09%	37	0.38%	64	0.65%	667	6.80%	9,814
Lincoln	3,951	39.57%	5,812	58.21%	131	1.31%	90	0.90%	-1,861	-18.64%	9,984
Manitowoc	13,142	50.30%	12,616	48.29%	248	0.95%	120	0.46%	526	2.01%	26,126
Marathon	13,724	46.57%	15,264	51.80%	373	1.27%	108	0.37%	-1,540	-5.23%	29,469
Marinette	7,703	49.75%	7,688	49.65%	48	0.31%	44	0.28%	15	0.10%	15,483
Marquette	1,195	27.71%	3,086	71.57%	11	0.26%	20	0.46%	-1,891	-43.85%	4,312
Milwaukee	209,861	59.75%	131,120	37.33%	8,484	2.42%	1,748	0.50%	78,741	22.42%	351,213
Monroe	4,673	36.33%	8,042	62.52%	84	0.65%	64	0.50%	-3,369	-26.19%	12,863
Oconto	5,273	45.55%	6,238	53.88%	37	0.32%	29	0.25%	-965	-8.34%	11,577
Oneida	5,375	58.77%	3,694	40.39%	59	0.65%	18	0.20%	1,681	18.38%	9,146
Outagamie	12,168	40.47%	17,733	58.98%	99	0.33%	67	0.22%	-5,565	-18.51%	30,067
Ozaukee	3,662	41.98%	4,913	56.32%	125	1.43%	23	0.26%	-1,251	-14.34%	8,723
Pepin	1,194	33.90%	2,272	64.51%	39	1.11%	17	0.48%	-1,078	-30.61%	3,522
Pierce	3,259	32.59%	6,624	66.25%	69	0.69%	47	0.47%	-3,365	-33.65%	9,999
Polk	4,979	44.27%	6,031	53.62%	185	1.64%	53	0.47%	-1,052	-9.35%	11,248
Portage	10,148	63.78%	5,670	35.63%	50	0.31%	44	0.28%	4,478	28.14%	15,912
Price	4,042	49.94%	3,879	47.93%	67	0.83%	105	1.30%	163	2.01%	8,093
Racine	23,532	54.75%	18,753	43.63%	480	1.12%	213	0.50%	4,779	11.12%	42,978
Richland	3,524	38.56%	5,527	60.48%	30	0.33%	58	0.63%	-2,003	-21.92%	9,139
Rock	17,543	46.29%	20,141	53.15%	104	0.27%	110	0.29%	-2,598	-6.86%	37,898
Rusk	3,578	49.97%	3,484	48.66%	42	0.59%	56	0.78%	94	1.31%	7,160
Sauk	6,106	38.87%	9,363	59.61%	116	0.74%	122	0.78%	-3,257	-20.74%	15,707
Sawyer	2,439	46.61%	2,745	52.46%	25	0.48%	24	0.46%	-306	-5.85%	5,233
Shawano	5,241	44.51%	6,377	54.16%	94	0.80%	62	0.53%	-1,136	-9.65%	11,774
Sheboygan	15,800	49.77%	15,305	48.21%	504	1.59%	138	0.43%	495	1.56%	31,747
St. Croix	4,898	41.24%	6,857	57.74%	80	0.67%	41	0.35%	-1,959	-16.50%	11,876
Taylor	3,771	49.11%	3,668	47.77%	190	2.47%	49	0.64%	103	1.34%	7,678
Trempealeau	5,175	48.92%	5,319	50.28%	40	0.38%	45	0.43%	-144	-1.36%	10,579
Vernon	5,776	46.24%	6,614	52.95%	25	0.20%	77	0.62%	-838	-6.71%	12,492
Vilas	2,470	51.48%	2,251	46.92%	25	0.52%	52	1.08%	219	4.56%	4,798
Walworth	5,449	31.77%	11,594	67.59%	62	0.36%	49	0.29%	-6,145	-35.82%	17,154
Washburn	2,901	50.35%	2,805	48.68%	20	0.35%	36	0.62%	96	1.67%	5,762
Washington	4,683	35.00%	8,501	63.54%	150	1.12%	46	0.34%	-3,818	-28.54%	13,380
Waukesha	12,859	42.94%	16,726	55.86%	287	0.96%	72	0.24%	-3,867	-12.91%	29,944
Waupaca	4,616	29.09%	11,099	69.95%	87	0.55%	64	0.40%	-6,483	-40.86%	15,866
Waushara	1,747	26.13%	4,872	72.88%	27	0.40%	39	0.58%	-3,125	-46.75%	6,685
Winnebago	15,570	45.08%	18,697	54.14%	64	0.19%	204	0.59%	-3,127	-9.05%	34,535
Wood	8,574	46.59%	9,654	52.46%	97	0.53%	77	0.42%	-1,080	-5.87%	18,402
Totals	704,821	50.15%	679,206	48.32%	15,071	1.07%	6,442	0.46%	25,615	1.82%	1,405,540

==== Counties that flipped from Democratic to Republican ====
- Barron
- Buffalo
- Calumet
- Chippewa
- Clark
- Columbia
- Crawford
- Dodge
- Door
- Dunn
- Florence
- Fond du Lac
- Grant
- Green
- Green Lake
- Iowa
- Jefferson
- Juneau
- Kewaunee
- La Crosse
- Lafayette
- Lincoln
- Marathon
- Monroe
- Oconto
- Outagamie
- Ozaukee
- Pepin
- Pierce
- Polk
- Rock
- Sauk
- Sawyer
- Shawano
- St. Croix
- Trempealeau
- Vernon
- Washington
- Waukesha
- Waupaca
- Winnebago
- Wood

=== Electors ===
These were the names of the electors on each ticket.

Franklin D. Roosevelt & Henry A. Wallace Democratic Party	Wendell Willkie & Charles L. McNary Republican Party	Norman Thomas & Maynard C. Krueger Social-Democratic Party	Earl R. Browder & James W. Ford Communist Party	Roger W. Babson & Edgar Moorman Prohibition Party	John W. Aiken & Aaron M. Orange Socialist Labor Party
William B. Rubin; Charles E. Hammersley; Edwin J. Boyle; A. L. Olson; Albert C. Wolfe; Walter McGrath; William J. McCauley; Maurice Fitzsimmons Sr.; A. J. Aschenbrener; John D. Kehoe; Miles McNally; George Meyer	Lila O. Burton; D. J. Kenny; B. P. Eldred Sr.; William Hoard; E. J. Roethe; Frank Wabiszewski; Edward Kickhaefer; Harry Hill; W. E. Fisher; Robert K. Bassett; G. Donald Barnes; Henry O. Goode	Carl Benson; William Cote; Anna Mae Davis; David Gourlie; Fred Kneevers; George Nelson; John Pearson Jr.; William F. Quick; Olin Swenson; Walter C. Weinig; William C. White; Lucy J. Work	Edwin Johnson; James Knox; Violet Hamilton; Clarence Kailin; John Emedy; Matt Vetengl; Leslie William Potter; Leonard L. Gudex; Esther Mattson; Ellen O. Johnson; Emil Luchterhand; Joseph Polin	Edward L. Cady; Luther B. Irish; Jacob Jensen; Otto D. Kahl; George McKerrow; Verdie Martiny; Ivan D. Mishoff; William C. Pickering; C. Howard Purdy; Nellie Tribbey; Wesley R. Vasey; Merritt L. Welles	Trueman F. Davis; Wakter Schwartz; Stephen Paschke; Christopher Hagen; Louis Ballin; Marko Golubich; Louis Myler; Anthony Kolosso; John Bialkowski; Robert Petersen; Albert C. Larson; Keith McKenzie

== See also ==
- United States presidential elections in Wisconsin
