= Lake Thompson (South Dakota) =

Lake in the state of South Dakota, United States

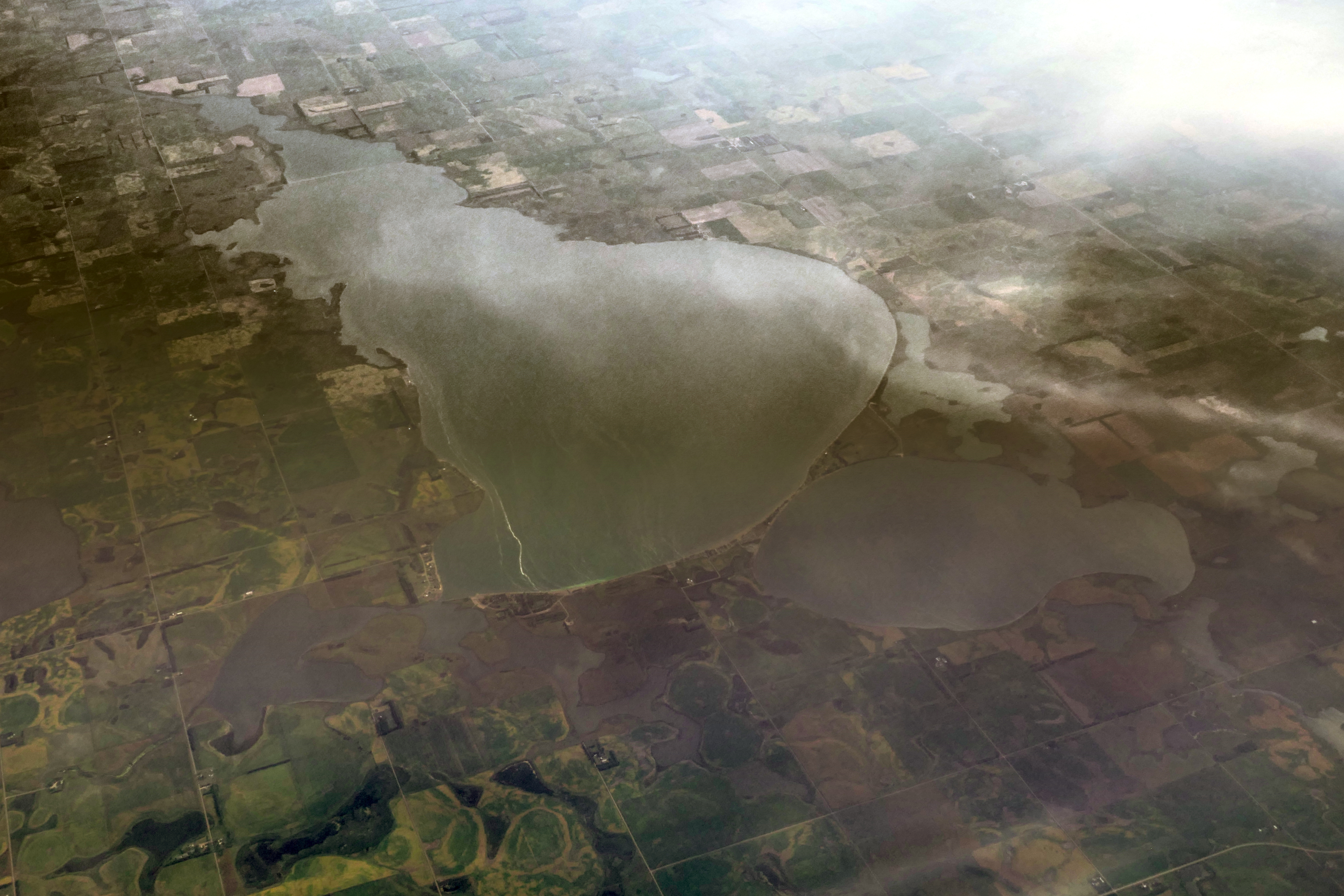

- Location within South Dakota Location within the United States
- Location: Kingsbury and Miner counties, South Dakota
- Coordinates: 44°17′06″N 97°27′43″W
- Basin countries: United States
- Surface area: 16,236 acres (65.70 km^{2})
- Max. depth: 26 ft (7.9 m)
- Shore length^{1}: 44.6 miles (71.8 km)
- Surface elevation: 1,667 feet (508 m)

U.S. National Natural Landmark
- Designated: 1975
- ^{1} Shore length is not a well-defined measure.

Lake Thompson is a lake in Kingsbury County, South Dakota, United States. With an area of 16,236 acres (65.70 km^{2}), it is one of the largest natural lakes in South Dakota. The maximum depth of the lake is 26 ft (7.9 m), and the shoreline has a length of 44.6 miles (71.8 km). The lake is located in east-central South Dakota, on the Coteau des Prairies and is within the watershed of the Vermillion River.

Lake Thompson's size is highly variable. It was completely dry during the 1930s. By the early 1990s, it had grown to cover (at times) 20,000 acres (81 km^{2}), becoming the largest natural lake in the state.

The lake is the location of a state recreation area managed by the South Dakota Department of Game, Fish, and Parks which includes camping facilities. Several boat launches are also located on the lake. A popular destination for anglers, game fish in the lake include walleye, northern pike, yellow perch and sunfish. Common carp and black bullheads are also present.

The area is an important habitat for fish and waterfowl, and Lake Thompson has been named a National Natural Landmark.

Lake Thompson has the name of John Thompson, an early settler. Lake Thompson is near De Smet, one of the residences of author Laura Ingalls Wilder, and appears in several of her novels as one of the "Twin Lakes", along with Lake Henry.

== See also ==
- List of lakes in South Dakota
