= Topbar, South Dakota =

Topbar
- Unincorporated community
- Location within the state of South Dakota
- Coordinates: 44°18′42″N 101°36′50″W
- Country: United States
- State: South Dakota
- County: Haakon
- Time zone: UTC-7 (Mountain (MST))
  - Summer (DST): UTC-6 (MDT)

Topbar, South Dakota (also known as Top Bar), is a populated place in West Haakon township in Haakon County, South Dakota, United States, near to Milesville, South Dakota and Philip, South Dakota.

== History ==
Carrie Ingalls, younger sister of Laura Ingalls Wilder (Little House on the Prairie) was an independent young woman, and though single, she filed on a homestead claim in Top Bar, South Dakota. She met there her future husband; David N. Swanzey and his children.
