= Pepin (town), Wisconsin =

Pepin, Wisconsin
- Town
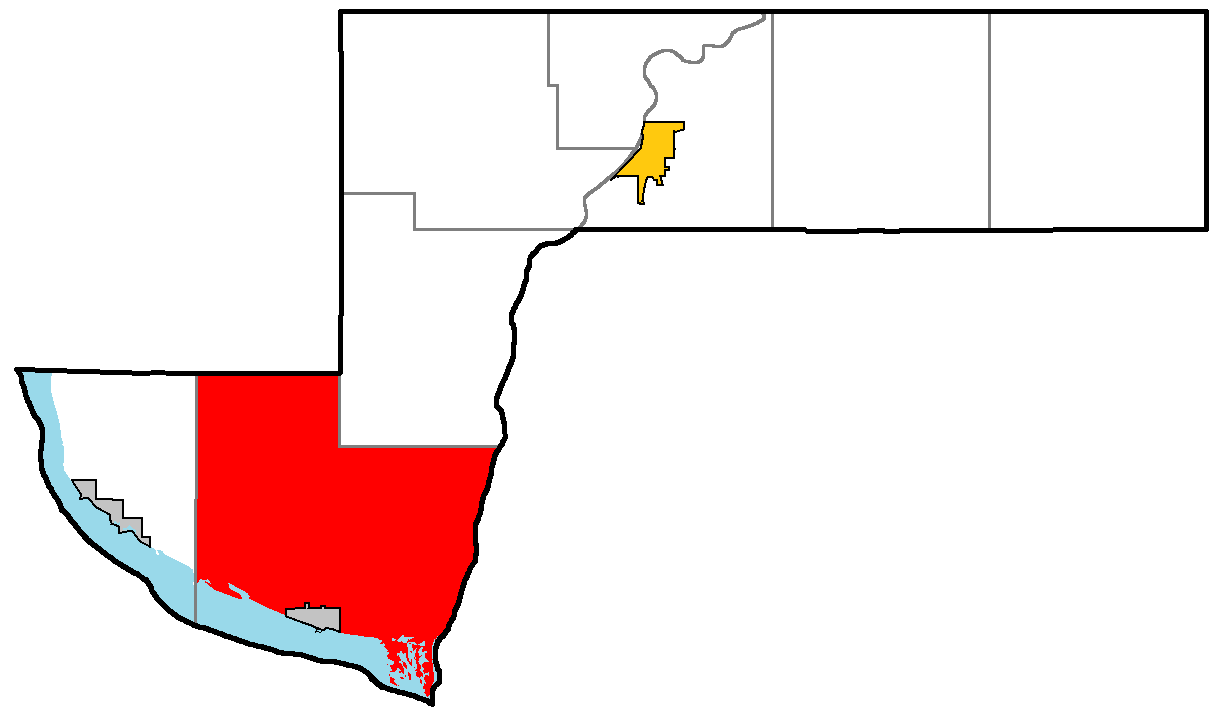
- Location of Pepin, Pepin County

- Location of Pepin County, Wisconsin
- Coordinates: 44°28′42″N 92°8′26″W
- Country: United States
- State: Wisconsin
- County: Pepin

Area
  - Total: 52.5 sq mi (136.1 km^{2})
  - Land: 45.4 sq mi (117.7 km^{2})
  - Water: 7.1 sq mi (18.4 km^{2})
- Elevation: 1,080 ft (330 m)

Population (2020)
  - Total: 741
  - Density: 16.3/sq mi (6.30/km^{2})
- Time zone: UTC-6 (Central (CST))
  - Summer (DST): UTC-5 (CDT)
- Area codes: 715 & 534
- FIPS code: 55-61950
- GNIS feature ID: 1583909
- Website: https://www.townofpepin.org/

Pepin (/ˈpɛpɪn/ PEP-in) is a town in Pepin County, Wisconsin, United States. The population was 741 at the 2020 census. The unincorporated communities of Barry Corner, Devils Corner, Hawkins Corner, and Lakeport are located in the town. The unincorporated community of Lund is also partially located within the town.

== History ==
=== Laura Ingalls Wilder ===
The Little House Wayside, the birthplace of Laura Ingalls Wilder, is in the town of Pepin, one mile southeast of Lund. Laura Ingalls Wilder was born here on February 7, 1867.

== Geography ==
According to the United States Census Bureau, the town has a total area of 52.6 square miles (136.1 km^{2}), of which 45.4 square miles (117.7 km^{2}) is land and 7.1 square miles (18.4 km^{2}) (13.55%) is water.

== Demographics ==
As of the census of 2000, there were 580 people, 232 households, and 168 families residing in the town. The population density was 12.8 people per square mile (4.9/km^{2}). There were 273 housing units at an average density of 6.0 per square mile (2.3/km^{2}). The racial makeup of the town was 99.14% White, 0.34% Black or African American, 0.34% Native American, and 0.17% from two or more races. 0.69% of the population were Hispanic or Latino of any race.

There were 232 households, out of which 30.6% had children under the age of 18 living with them, 63.4% were married couples living together, 5.2% had a female householder with no husband present, and 27.2% were non-families. 23.3% of all households were made up of individuals, and 9.1% had someone living alone who was 65 years of age or older. The average household size was 2.50 and the average family size was 2.97.

In the town, the population was spread out, with 25.0% under the age of 18, 6.2% from 18 to 24, 23.8% from 25 to 44, 30.3% from 45 to 64, and 14.7% who were 65 years of age or older. The median age was 42 years. For every 100 females, there were 100.7 males. For every 100 females age 18 and over, there were 106.2 males.

The median income for a household in the town was $44,444, and the median income for a family was $51,053. Males had a median income of $29,722 versus $17,361 for females. The per capita income for the town was $18,902. About 4.1% of families and 4.9% of the population were below the poverty line, including 6.1% of those under age 18 and 6.3% of those age 65 or over.

== Government ==
The Town of Pepin is governed by a town board consisting of a chair and four supervisors. The town assessor is an appointed position.
