= Lake Henry (Kingsbury County, South Dakota) =

Lake in the state of South Dakota, United States

- Location within South Dakota Location within the United States
- Location: Kingsbury, South Dakota
- Coordinates: 44°19′41″N 97°29′7″W
- Basin countries: United States
- Surface area: 2,000 acres (8.1 km^{2})
- Surface elevation: 1,690 ft (520 m)

Lake Henry, is a natural lake in Kingsbury County, South Dakota, in the United States, near the town of De Smet. It has the name of George Henry, an early settler. Nowadays it is a popular fishing area.

== In the media ==
Lake Henry is near De Smet, one of the residences of author Laura Ingalls Wilder (Little House on the Prairie books) and appears in several of her novels as one of the "Twin Lakes", along with Lake Thompson.

== See also ==
- List of lakes in South Dakota
