= Pepin, Wisconsin =

- Village
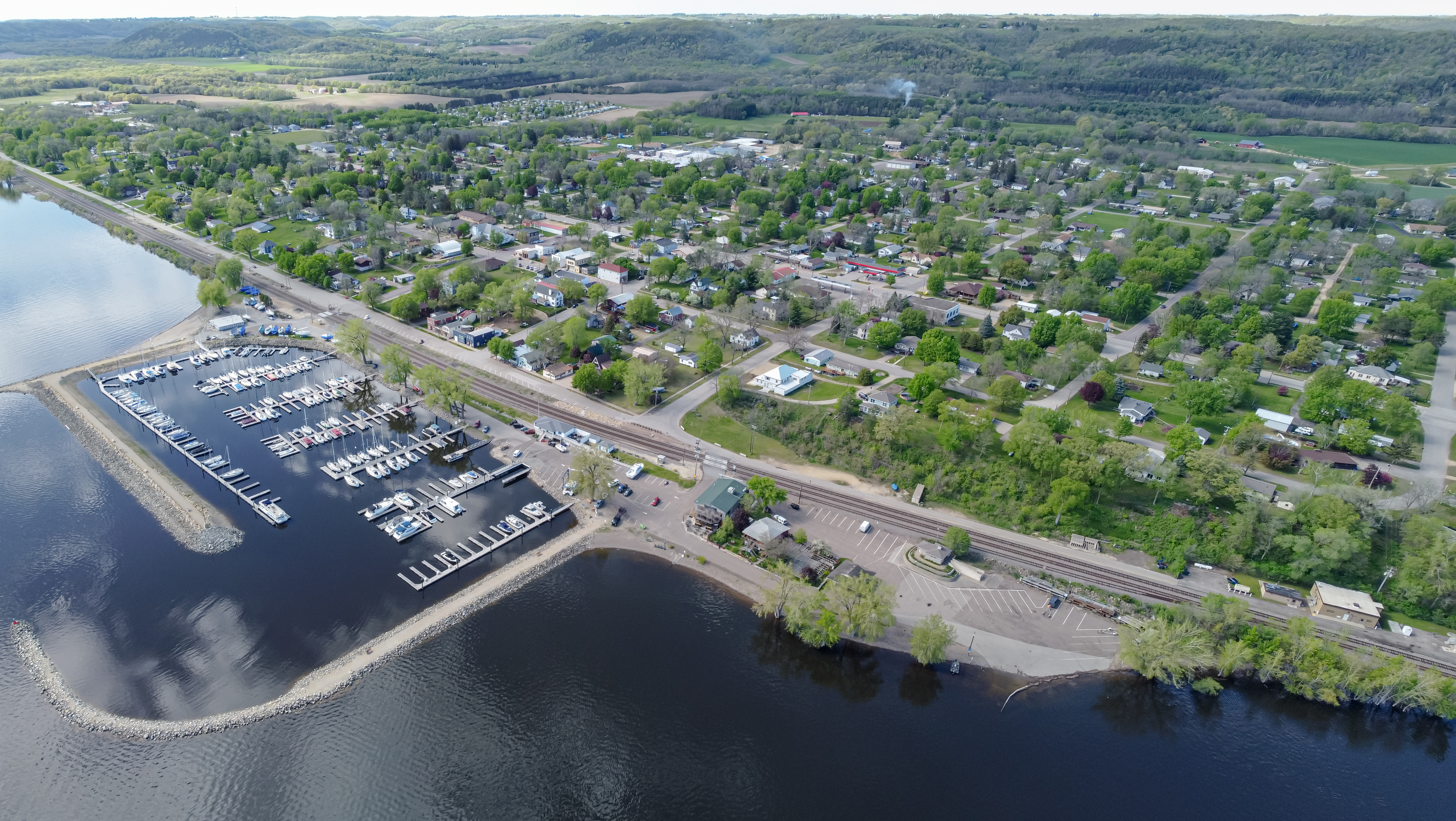
- Wis-35 and the BNSF Railway run through town

- Location of Pepin in Pepin County, Wisconsin.
- Coordinates: 44°26′33″N 92°8′52″W
- Country: United States
- State: Wisconsin
- County: Pepin

Area
  - Total: 0.72 sq mi (1.87 km^{2})
  - Land: 0.72 sq mi (1.87 km^{2})
  - Water: 0 sq mi (0.00 km^{2})
- Elevation: 720 ft (220 m)

Population (2020)
  - Total: 731
  - Density: 1,010/sq mi (391/km^{2})
- Time zone: UTC-6 (Central (CST))
  - Summer (DST): UTC-5 (CDT)
- Area codes: 715 & 534
- FIPS code: 55-61925
- Website: https://www.pepinwisconsin.org/

Pepin (/ˈpɛpɪn/ PEP-in) is a village in Pepin County, Wisconsin, United States. The population was 731 at the 2020 census. The village is surrounded within the borders of the Town of Pepin.

== History ==
By the mid-17th century, the French had begun to send expeditions into Wisconsin via the Great Lakes and Saint Lawrence River. King Louis XIII of France is believed to have granted a huge area of land in the Upper Mississippi River Valley to two brothers, Etiene Pepin de la Fond and Guillaume dit Tranchemontagne. Two of Guillaume’s sons, Pierre Pepin and Jean Pepin du Cardonnets, later explored and traded in this area, and their surname became attached to the lake, and ultimately to the village and the county.

== Geography ==
Pepin is located at 44°26′33″N 92°8′52″W (44.442724, -92.147884).

According to the United States Census Bureau, the village has a total area of 0.70 square miles (1.81 km^{2}), all land.

== Demographics ==
Historical population
Census	Pop.	Note	%±
1890	369		—
1900	407		10.3%
1910	397		−2.5%
1920	555		39.8%
1930	603		8.6%
1940	754		25.0%
1950	840		11.4%
1960	825		−1.8%
1970	747		−9.5%
1980	890		19.1%
1990	873		−1.9%
2000	878		0.6%
2010	837		−4.7%
2020	731		−12.7%
U.S. Decennial Census

=== 2010 census ===
As of the census of 2010, there were 837 people, 399 households, and 226 families living in the village. The population density was 1,195.7 inhabitants per square mile (461.7/km^{2}). There were 490 housing units at an average density of 700.0 per square mile (270.3/km^{2}). The racial makeup of the village was 98.9% White, 0.2% African American, 0.2% Native American, 0.4% Asian, and 0.2% from two or more races. Hispanic or Latino of any race were 0.2% of the population.

There were 399 households, of which 18.5% had children under the age of 18 living with them, 48.4% were married couples living together, 6.8% had a female householder with no husband present, 1.5% had a male householder with no wife present, and 43.4% were non-families. 38.3% of all households were made up of individuals, and 16.1% had someone living alone who was 65 years of age or older. The average household size was 1.98 and the average family size was 2.58.

The median age in the village was 53.9 years. 14.6% of residents were under the age of 18; 4.3% were between the ages of 18 and 24; 19.4% were from 25 to 44; 33.8% were from 45 to 64; and 28% were 65 years of age or older. The gender makeup of the village was 47.8% male and 52.2% female.

=== 2000 census ===
As of the census of 2000, there were 878 people, 381 households, and 241 families living in the village. The population density was 1,238.1 people per square mile (477.5/km^{2}). There were 430 housing units at an average density of 606.4 per square mile (233.8/km^{2}). The racial makeup of the village was 98.29% White, 0.11% Black or African American, 0.34% Native American, 0.57% Asian, and 0.68% from two or more races.

There were 381 households, out of which 22.3% had children under the age of 18 living with them, 52.2% were married couples living together, 7.1% had a female householder with no husband present, and 36.5% were non-families. 32.8% of all households were made up of individuals, and 18.9% had someone living alone who was 65 years of age or older. The average household size was 2.17 and the average family size was 2.74.

In the village, the population was spread out, with 17.3% under the age of 18, 6.4% from 18 to 24, 21.9% from 25 to 44, 26.2% from 45 to 64, and 28.2% who were 65 years of age or older. The median age was 48 years. For every 100 females, there were 94.7 males. For every 100 females age 18 and over, there were 92.1 males.

The median income for a household in the village was $36,319, and the median income for a family was $41,250. Males had a median income of $31,393 versus $22,875 for females. The per capita income for the village was $17,755. About 2.0% of families and 5.8% of the population were below the poverty line, including 7.5% of those under age 18 and 11.2% of those age 65 or over.

== Notable people ==
- Nathaniel O. Murray, steamboat owner and Wisconsin state legislator, lived in Pepin.
- The author Laura Ingalls Wilder was born in the Pepin area, near Lund, Wisconsin, where her family lived. The Laura Ingalls Wilder Museum is in the village. The Little House Wayside, a rest stop on the land where Wilder was born, is located seven miles northwest of the village, in the town of Pepin. A replica of the house her father built, in which she was born, stands on the site, and is open to visitors except during the snows of Winter.
