= Pepin County, Wisconsin =

County in Wisconsin, United States

- County
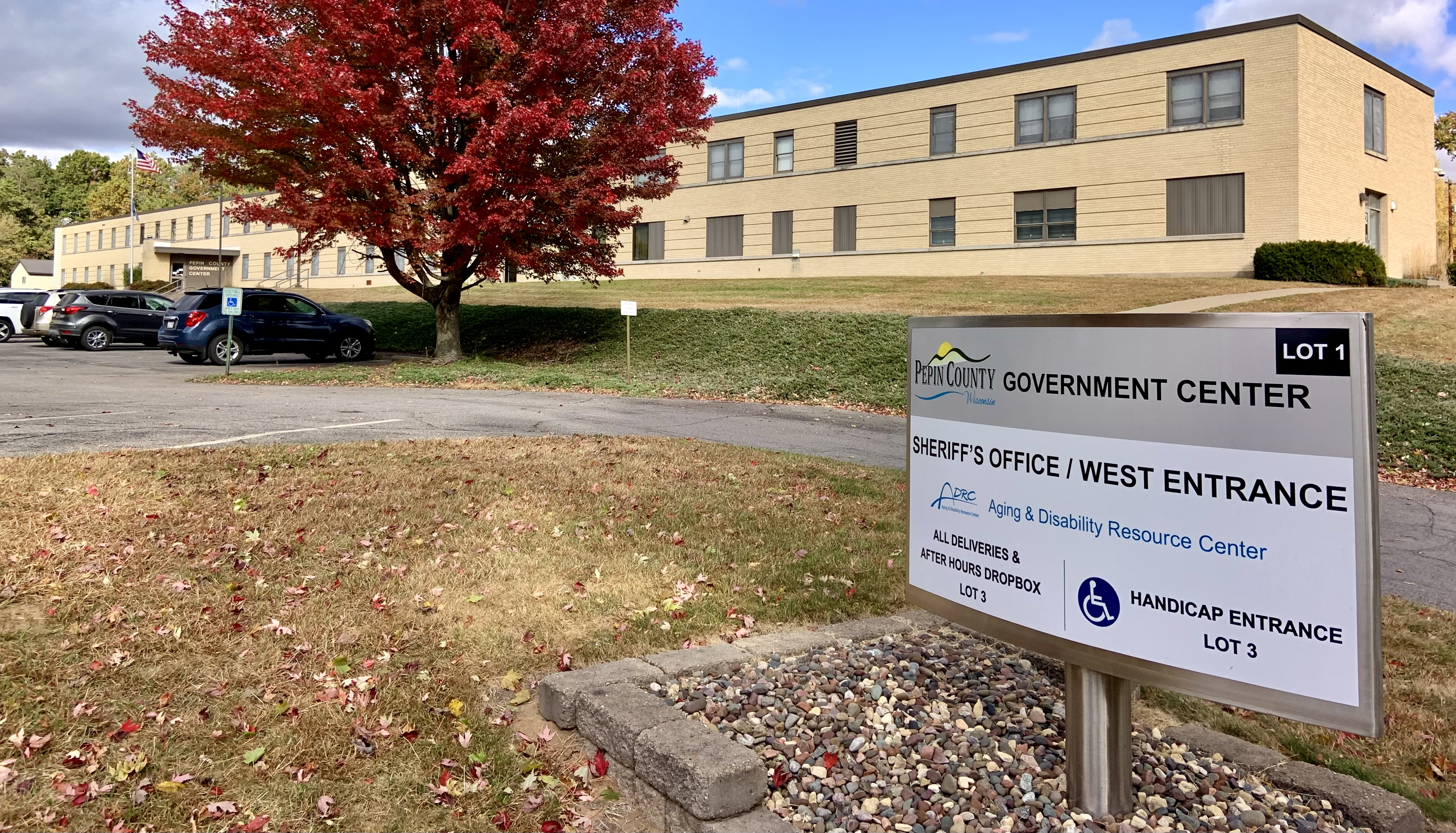
- Pepin County Building

- Location within the U.S. state of Wisconsin
- Coordinates: 44°36′N 92°00′W
- Country: United States
- State: Wisconsin
- Founded: February 25, 1858
- Named for: Lake Pepin
- Seat: Durand
- Largest city: Durand

Area
  - Total: 249 sq mi (640 km^{2})
  - Land: 232 sq mi (600 km^{2})
  - Water: 17 sq mi (44 km^{2}) 6.7%

Population (2020)
  - Total: 7,318
  - Estimate (2025): 7,513 ▲
  - Density: 32.4/sq mi (12.5/km^{2})
- Time zone: UTC−6 (Central)
  - Summer (DST): UTC−5 (CDT)
- Congressional district: 3rd
- Website: www.co.pepin.wi.us

Pepin County (/ˈpɛpɪn/ PEP-in) is a county in the U.S. state of Wisconsin. As of the 2020 census, the population was 7,318, making it the fourth-least populous county in Wisconsin; it is also the smallest county in Wisconsin by area. Its county seat is Durand.

Pepin County is the birthplace of Laura Ingalls Wilder, the author of the Little House on the Prairie children's books.

== History ==
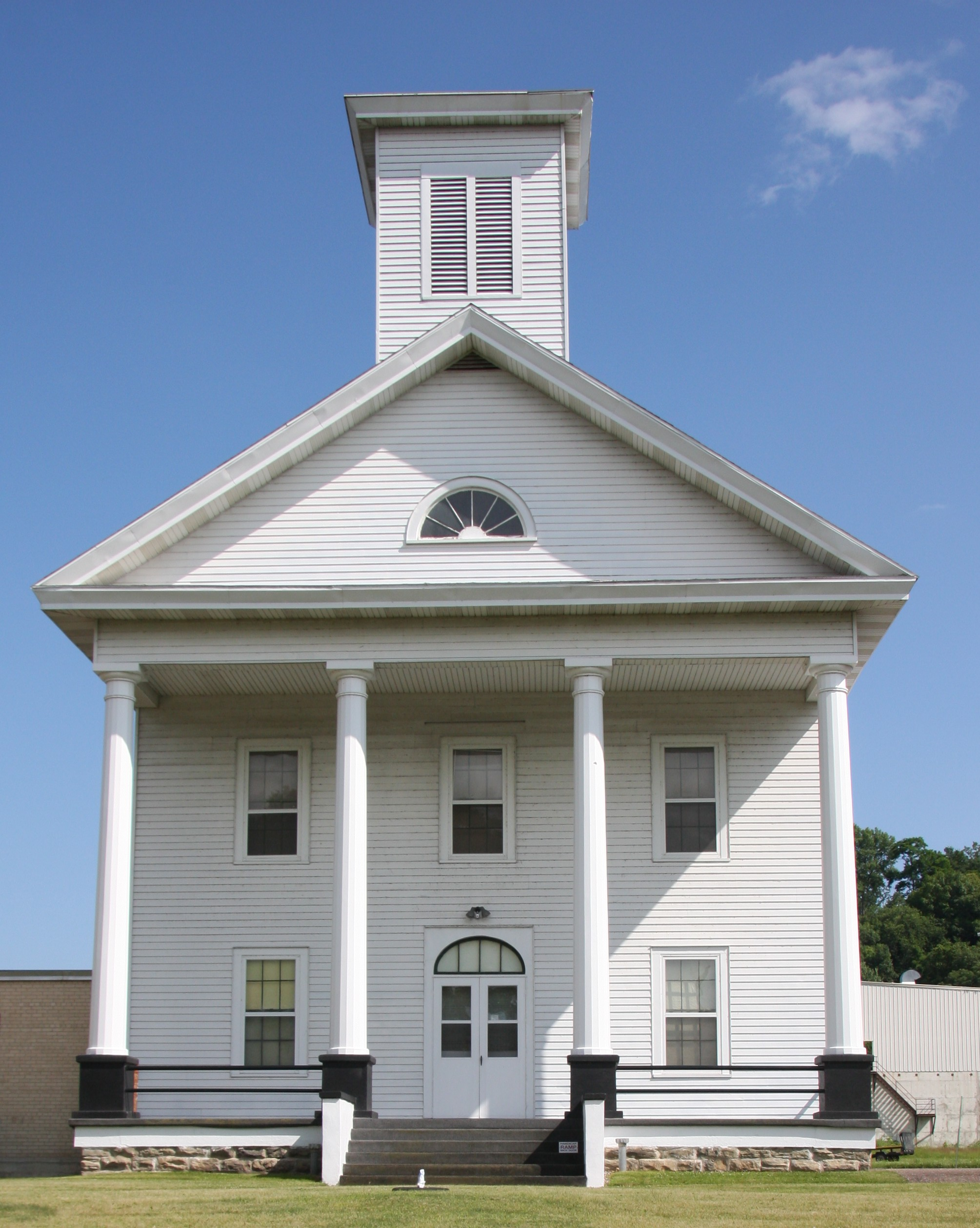
Historic Pepin County Courthouse and Jail in Durand, Wisconsin

Pepin County was formed in the year 1858 from portions of neighboring Dunn County. Both the town of Pepin (originally named North Pepin in 1856), and the village of Pepin were named after Lake Pepin, a broadening of the Mississippi River between Pepin County and the Counties of Goodhue and Wabasha in the state of Minnesota. The lake itself is likely named for one or more of the Pepin families from the French Canadian city of Trois-Rivières in Quebec, Canada. Several Pepins appear in the early records, including the senior figure Guillaume dit Tranchemontagne and his descendants Pierre and Jean Pepin du Chardonnets. One or both of the latter may have accompanied Daniel Greysolon, the Sieur du Lhut, from Montreal to what is now Duluth, Minnesota, in 1679. Exactly when the body of water was first named Pepin is not known, but the name has been used as early as 1700, making it by far one of the oldest recorded place names in Wisconsin. The name was well accepted by the mid-1760s when Jonathan Carver wrote in his journal, "Arrived at Lake Pepin called by some Lake St. Anthony."

=== The North Pepin Independent ===
The North Pepin Independent 1856-1857 was the first newspaper in Pepin County. Pepin county is located on the Western border of Wisconsin. Also known as The Pepin Independent, it was founded December 24, 1856, by U.B. Shaver until June 20, 1857. It was distributed weekly in North Pepin County and Dunn County in Wisconsin. Volume 1 consisted of 23 issues and volume 2 included. The North Pepin Independent was suspended within a year, but was revived in April 1858, by E.W. Gurley and E.B. Newcomb. In the following year of October 1859, it was again suspended. The North Pepin Independent had a brief existence but is available on microfilm from The State Historical Society of Wisconsin.

The 4 page North Pepin Independent was a reporter of the time, the people, and the county. The opening page covered advertisements, business cards, news updates, and election results. The second page started filling up with articles, mostly written by local community members. The third page was continued articles and the location of advertisements, many of which were for local stores. One could also find help wanted and things for sale on the third page. The final page had more advertisements and the newspaper contributors had their own sections to talk about their opinions.

== Geography ==
According to the U.S. Census Bureau, the county has a total area of 249 square miles (640 km^{2}), of which 232 square miles (600 km^{2}) is land and 17 square miles (44 km^{2}) (6.7%) is water. It is the smallest county in Wisconsin by land area.

=== Adjacent counties ===
- Pierce County – northwest
- Dunn County – north
- Eau Claire County – east
- Buffalo County – south
- Wabasha County, Minnesota – southwest
- Goodhue County, Minnesota – west

=== Major highways ===
- U.S. Highway 10
- Highway 25 (Wisconsin)
- Highway 35 (Wisconsin)
- Highway 85 (Wisconsin)

=== Railroads ===
- BNSF

== Demographics ==
Historical population
Census	Pop.	Note	%±
1860	2,392		—
1870	4,659		94.8%
1880	6,226		33.6%
1890	6,932		11.3%
1900	7,905		14.0%
1910	7,577		−4.1%
1920	7,481		−1.3%
1930	7,450		−0.4%
1940	7,897		6.0%
1950	7,462		−5.5%
1960	7,332		−1.7%
1970	7,319		−0.2%
1980	7,477		2.2%
1990	7,107		−4.9%
2000	7,213		1.5%
2010	7,469		3.5%
2020	7,318		−2.0%
2025 (est.)	7,513	▲	2.7%
U.S. Decennial Census; 1790–1960 1900–90; 1990–2000 2010–20 2025

=== Racial and ethnic composition ===
Pepin County, Wisconsin – Racial and ethnic composition Note: the US Census treats Hispanic/Latino as an ethnic category. This table excludes Latinos from the racial categories and assigns them to a separate category. Hispanics/Latinos may be of any race.
Race / ethnicity (NH = Non-Hispanic)	Pop 1980	Pop 1990	Pop 2000	Pop 2010	Pop 2020	% 1980	% 1990	% 2000	% 2010	% 2020
White alone (NH)	7,441	7,057	7,122	7,305	6,866	99.52%	99.30%	98.74%	97.80%	93.82%
Black or African American alone (NH)	1	2	6	18	20	0.01%	0.03%	0.08%	0.24%	0.27%
Native American or Alaska Native alone (NH)	8	18	13	17	33	0.11%	0.25%	0.18%	0.23%	0.45%
Asian alone (NH)	6	9	15	13	22	0.08%	0.13%	0.21%	0.17%	0.30%
Native Hawaiian or Pacific Islander alone (NH)	x	x	3	1	0	x	x	0.04%	0.01%	0.00%
Other race alone (NH)	1	1	0	4	7	0.01%	0.01%	0.00%	0.05%	0.10%
Mixed race or Multiracial (NH)	x	x	29	39	213	x	x	0.40%	0.52%	2.91%
Hispanic or Latino (any race)	20	20	25	72	157	0.27%	0.28%	0.35%	0.96%	2.15%
Total	7,477	7,107	7,213	7,469	7,318	100.00%	100.00%	100.00%	100.00%	100.00%

=== 2020 census ===
As of the 2020 census, the county had a population of 7,318. The population density was 31.5 people per square mile (12.2 people/km^{2}). There were 3,573 housing units at an average density of 15.4 units per square mile (5.9 units/km^{2}).

The median age was 46.2 years. 22.0% of residents were under the age of 18 and 22.8% of residents were 65 years of age or older. For every 100 females there were 106.8 males, and for every 100 females age 18 and over there were 106.2 males age 18 and over.

There were 3,085 households in the county, of which 26.5% had children under the age of 18 living in them. Of all households, 54.6% were married-couple households, 19.8% were households with a male householder and no spouse or partner present, and 18.4% were households with a female householder and no spouse or partner present. About 27.7% of all households were made up of individuals and 14.4% had someone living alone who was 65 years of age or older.

There were 3,573 housing units, of which 13.7% were vacant. Among occupied housing units, 79.6% were owner-occupied and 20.4% were renter-occupied. The homeowner vacancy rate was 0.9% and the rental vacancy rate was 7.0%.

The racial makeup of the county was 94.3% White, 0.3% Black or African American, 0.5% American Indian and Alaska Native, 0.3% Asian, <0.1% Native Hawaiian and Pacific Islander, 1.0% from some other race, and 3.5% from two or more races. Hispanic or Latino residents of any race comprised 2.1% of the population.

<0.1% of residents lived in urban areas, while 100.0% lived in rural areas.

2000 Census Age Pyramid for Pepin County

=== 2000 census ===
As of the census of 2000, there were 7,213 people, 2,759 households, and 1,934 families residing in the county. The population density was 31 people per square mile (12 people/km^{2}). There were 3,036 housing units at an average density of 13 units per square mile (5.0 units/km^{2}). The racial makeup of the county was 98.90% White, 0.08% Black or African American, 0.19% Native American, 0.21% Asian, 0.04% Pacific Islander, 0.08% from other races, and 0.49% from two or more races. 0.35% of the population were Hispanic or Latino of any race. 41.6% were of German, 13.5% Norwegian, 9.9% Austrian and 6.8% Swedish ancestry. 95.2% spoke English and 3.4% German as their first language.

There were 2,759 households, out of which 32.40% had children under the age of 18 living with them, 59.90% were married couples living together, 6.80% had a female householder with no husband present, and 29.90% were non-families. 26.10% of all households were made up of individuals, and 13.60% had someone living alone who was 65 years of age or older. The average household size was 2.57 and the average family size was 3.13.

In the county, the population was spread out, with 26.50% under the age of 18, 7.90% from 18 to 24, 25.90% from 25 to 44, 22.80% from 45 to 64, and 16.80% who were 65 years of age or older. The median age was 39 years. For every 100 females there were 101.10 males. For every 100 females age 18 and over, there were 100.20 males.

=== Vital statistics ===
In 2017, there were 41 births, giving a general fertility rate of 79.6 births per 1000 women aged 15–44, the fifth highest rate out of all 72 Wisconsin counties. Additionally, there were no reported induced abortions performed on women of Pepin County residence in 2017.

== Government and politics ==
=== County Board of Supervisors ===
Pepin County has a 12-member board of supervisors.

=== Presidential elections ===
United States presidential election results for Pepin County, Wisconsin
Year	Republican		Democratic		Third party(ies)	
Year	No.	%	No.	%	No.	%
1892	865	57.78%	539	36.01%	93	6.21%
1896	1,301	72.48%	436	24.29%	58	3.23%
1900	1,099	68.35%	470	29.23%	39	2.43%
1904	1,033	73.21%	342	24.24%	36	2.55%
1908	1,010	67.42%	447	29.84%	41	2.74%
1912	528	40.00%	410	31.06%	382	28.94%
1916	766	53.23%	622	43.22%	51	3.54%
1920	1,817	84.91%	265	12.38%	58	2.71%
1924	1,226	55.88%	206	9.39%	762	34.73%
1928	1,839	58.57%	1,276	40.64%	25	0.80%
1932	1,152	36.86%	1,931	61.79%	42	1.34%
1936	1,466	42.54%	1,785	51.80%	195	5.66%
1940	2,272	64.51%	1,194	33.90%	56	1.59%
1944	1,902	64.28%	1,029	34.78%	28	0.95%
1948	1,333	48.23%	1,381	49.96%	50	1.81%
1952	2,348	72.14%	896	27.53%	11	0.34%
1956	1,975	65.51%	1,040	34.49%	0	0.00%
1960	1,612	47.69%	1,763	52.16%	5	0.15%
1964	1,069	33.11%	2,154	66.71%	6	0.19%
1968	1,493	49.98%	1,263	42.28%	231	7.73%
1972	1,458	49.26%	1,409	47.60%	93	3.14%
1976	1,312	39.35%	1,955	58.64%	67	2.01%
1980	1,541	44.40%	1,673	48.20%	257	7.40%
1984	1,555	48.56%	1,629	50.87%	18	0.56%
1988	1,311	40.36%	1,906	58.68%	31	0.95%
1992	1,098	30.74%	1,673	46.84%	801	22.42%
1996	1,007	32.56%	1,585	51.24%	501	16.20%
2000	1,631	44.51%	1,854	50.60%	179	4.89%
2004	1,853	45.57%	2,181	53.64%	32	0.79%
2008	1,616	42.85%	2,102	55.74%	53	1.41%
2012	1,794	48.50%	1,876	50.72%	29	0.78%
2016	2,206	59.06%	1,344	35.98%	185	4.95%
2020	2,584	62.36%	1,489	35.93%	71	1.71%
2024	2,798	64.26%	1,523	34.98%	33	0.76%

Prior to the election of Donald Trump in 2016, the last time Pepin County voted for the Republican candidate was in 1972, when voters backed President Richard Nixon (R) over George McGovern (D). Since 2016, Pepin County has continued shifting to the right in each election.

- Note: In 1924, Progressive candidate Robert M. La Follette Sr. came in second in Pepin County, receiving 33.59% of the vote (737 votes).

== Communities ==
=== City ===
- Durand (county seat)

=== Villages ===
- Pepin
- Stockholm

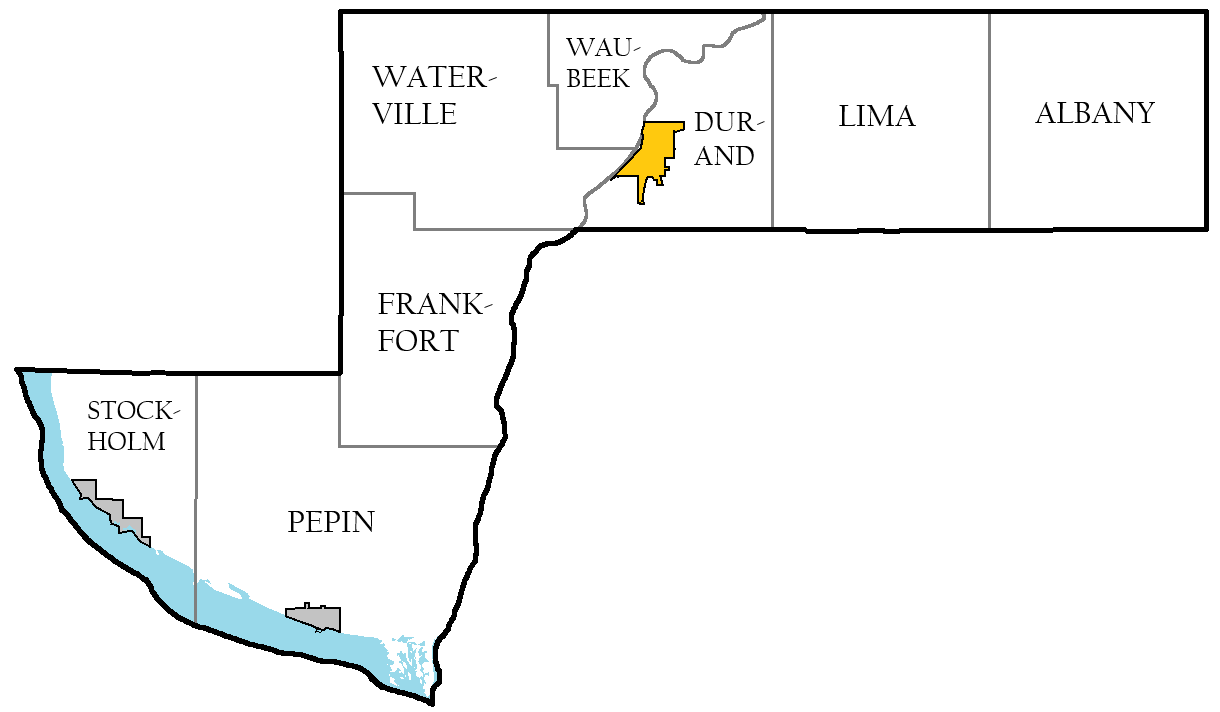
Towns of Pepin County

=== Towns ===
- Albany
- Durand (town)
- Frankfort
- Lima
- Pepin
- Stockholm
- Waterville
- Waubeek

=== Census-designated place ===
- Arkansaw

=== Unincorporated communities ===
- Barry Corner
- Devils Corner
- Ella
- Hawkins Corner
- Lakeport
- Lima
- Lund
- Porcupine
- Tarrant
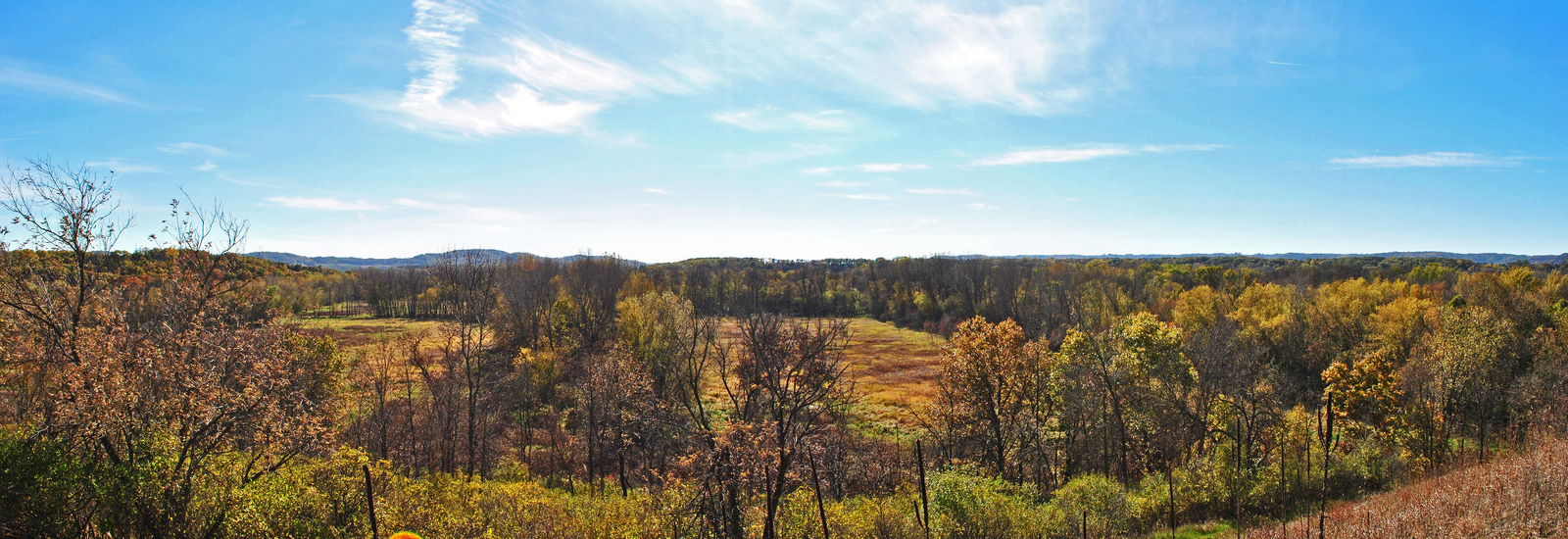
Pepin County panorama, west of Durand

== See also ==
- National Register of Historic Places listings in Pepin County, Wisconsin
