= Alex Bruesewitz =

American political consultant (born 1997)

- Bruesewitz in 2026
- Born: Alexander William Bruesewitz; March 12, 1997 (age 29)
- Political party: Republican
- Spouse: Carolina Urrea (m. 2026)

Alexander William Bruesewitz (born March 12, 1997) is an American political consultant. He is the co-founder and chief executive of X Strategies, a political consulting firm.

Bruesewitz began supporting Donald Trump as a political candidate in 2015. After Trump's victory in the 2016 presidential election, he co-founded X Strategies alongside Derek Utley. Bruesewitz was an organizer of Stop the Steal, an organization that attempted to overturn the 2020 presidential election, and he coordinated with Arizona representative Paul Gosar on the morning of the January 6 Capitol attack. Bruesewitz supported Trump's campaign in the 2024 presidential election. He began working for Trump's campaign in August 2024 and advised Trump to appear on alternative media, most prominently podcasts.

== Early life and education (1997–2015) ==
Alexander William Bruesewitz was born on March 12, 1997. Bruesewitz attended Ripon High School in Ripon, Wisconsin, graduating in 2015. He was elected as Ripon's class president, but resigned from the position after joking that the school's varsity football team was losing because he had sold its playbook to the opposing team. Bruesewitz was briefly on the school's soccer team. He developed an interest in the politics of the Republican Party through his mother. As early as 2014, Bruesewitz was involved in politics, having met the political activist Charlie Kirk that year.

== Career ==
=== Trump campaign and X Strategies (2015–2020) ===
In April 2015, Bruesewitz posted a photograph of the Trump International Hotel and Tower in Chicago, writing that its sign "would look just as good on the White House." Donald Trump, the building's proprietor, retweeted Bruesewitz's post. In June, Trump announced a presidential campaign in the 2016 presidential election. Bruesewitz told The Times that Trump's candidacy inspired Bruesewitz to forgo college and pursue a career in real estate. In 2017, he founded X Strategies, a political consulting firm, alongside Derek Utley, a Hewlett-Packard salesman. Their initial clients included the online school FreedomProject Academy and Andrew Pollack, a father whose daughter was a victim of the Parkland high school shooting. Bruesewitz managed Pollack's social media accounts to promote School Safety Grants, an advocacy organization. In February 2020, Marjorie Taylor Greene hired Bruesewitz to handle her social media accounts as she campaigned in that year's United States House of Representatives election for Georgia's fourteenth congressional district. He additionally advised Indiana representative Jim Banks's congressional campaigns and the Republican Study Committee.

=== Stop the Steal (2020–2021) ===
Bruesewitz was an organizer of Stop the Steal, an organization that attempted to overturn the 2020 presidential election. He sought to fund efforts to oust Republicans who did not oppose the certification of Joe Biden's victory in the 2021 Electoral College vote count. The vote count was interrupted by an attack on the United States Capitol; Bruesewitz told Politico that he did not participate in the attack, and he reportedly pleaded the Fifth Amendment when he was summoned by the House Select Committee to Investigate the January 6th Attack on the United States Capitol. Investigators for the committee revealed that Bruesewitz had messaged Arizona representative Paul Gosar on the morning of January 6, 2021, asking if Gosar had "[coordinated] with the other members" of the Freedom Caucus. Gosar replied that he had. Bruesewitz later stated that he would financially assist in the legal defense bills of accused rioters.

=== Continued political consulting (2021–present) ===
In March 2021, Catalina Lauf hired Bruesewitz to help manage her campaign in the United States House of Representatives election for Illinois's sixteenth congressional district to succeed Adam Kinzinger. Bruesewitz attended Trump's speech announcing his campaign for the 2024 presidential election at Mar-a-Lago in November 2022. The Trump family hired Bruesewitz to ensure that Trump would win the Republican Party presidential primaries against the ascendant Florida governor Ron DeSantis. By April 2023, Bruesewitz had advised Florida representatives Anna Paulina Luna and Cory Mills, as well as Trump's political action committee, Save America.

In April 2023, The Hill reported that Bruesewitz was considering running in the United States House of Representatives election for Wisconsin's eighth congressional district if the district's representative, Mike Gallagher, chose to run in the Senate election in Wisconsin. Bruesewitz declined to run in the election, but considered running again after Gallagher voted against the impeachment of Alejandro Mayorkas in February 2024, according to The Hill. That month, Bruesewitz was set to address the Montana Republican Party as a keynote speaker; the party rescinded his invitation after he criticized Montana representative Matt Rosendale, leading to a dispute between the party and several of Trump's advisors, including his son, Donald Trump Jr.

After the second report, Bruesewitz publicly posited a campaign and claimed that he would represent the MAGA movement. Bruesewitz was endorsed by Roger Stone, Trump's former campaign consultant, and Ken Sikora, the chair of the Republican Party for Oconto County. In April, he endorsed Tony Wied and said he would support Wied's campaign as an advisor. In August, Bruesewitz joined Trump's campaign as a consultant. Bruesewitz was a proponent of the Trump campaign utilizing alternative media. After the success of Trump's interview with the online streamer Adin Ross, Susie Wiles, Trump's co-campaign manager, enlisted Bruesewitz to have Trump appear on other podcasts, including The Joe Rogan Experience (2009–present). A meeting between Trump and the hosts of the podcasts Girls Gone Bible (2023–present) led to Bruesewitz dating Carolina Urrea, a former contestant in Miss Nevada USA; they engaged in June 2025 and married in February 2026, with their wedding having featured performances from Amber Rose, Nicki Minaj, and Sexyy Red.

=== Trump administration work (2024–present) ===
After Trump's victory in the 2024 election, Bruesewitz coordinated with the president of global affairs for Meta Platforms, Joel Kaplan, on revising its policies to mend relationships with Republicans. Bruesewitz was offered a position in the second Trump administration as its new-media director, but chose to remain at X Strategies. In February 2025, Axios reported that Bruesewitz would become a senior advisor to Never Surrender, Trump's political action committee for congressional leadership, and that X Strategies would manage Trump's political social media presence. Bruesewitz later expressed his support for the removal of cannabis from Schedule I of the Controlled Substances Act after a political action committee associated with the marijuana industry paid him US$300,000, according to The Wall Street Journal. Trump later ordered the reclassification of marijuana in December 2025. Axios reported that month that Bruesewitz had begun leading Impact, a competitor to the political fundraising platform WinRed.

The Trump administration's communication strategy, which included social media posts containing Internet memes and video-game clips, was influenced by Bruesewitz. He worked to bring several high-profile celebrities and sports figures to the White House, including the actor Vince Vaughn and the football coaches John and Jim Harbaugh. In January 2026, he arranged for Nicki Minaj to appear at an event promoting Trump accounts. Bruesewitz secured an interview between Trump and the influencer Jake Paul in March. That month, he toured a Thermo Fisher Scientific facility alongside Trump and Centers for Medicare and Medicaid Services administrator Mehmet Oz. In November 2025, Politico reported that Bruesewitz had urged James Fishback not to run in the 2026 Florida gubernatorial election, instead favoring Florida representative Byron Donalds. The following month, he advocated for redistricting efforts in Indiana.

== Books ==
In 2022, Bruesewitz authored Winning the Social Media War: How Conservatives Can Fight Back, Reclaim the Narrative and Turn the Tide Against the Left. The book included a foreword from Charlie Kirk.

== Works cited ==
- "Deposition of Alexander Bruesewitz" (Document). United States House Select Committee on the January 6 Attack. January 6, 2023.
