= 2024 United States Senate election in Wisconsin =

- November 5, 2024
- Turnout: 60.7% ▲
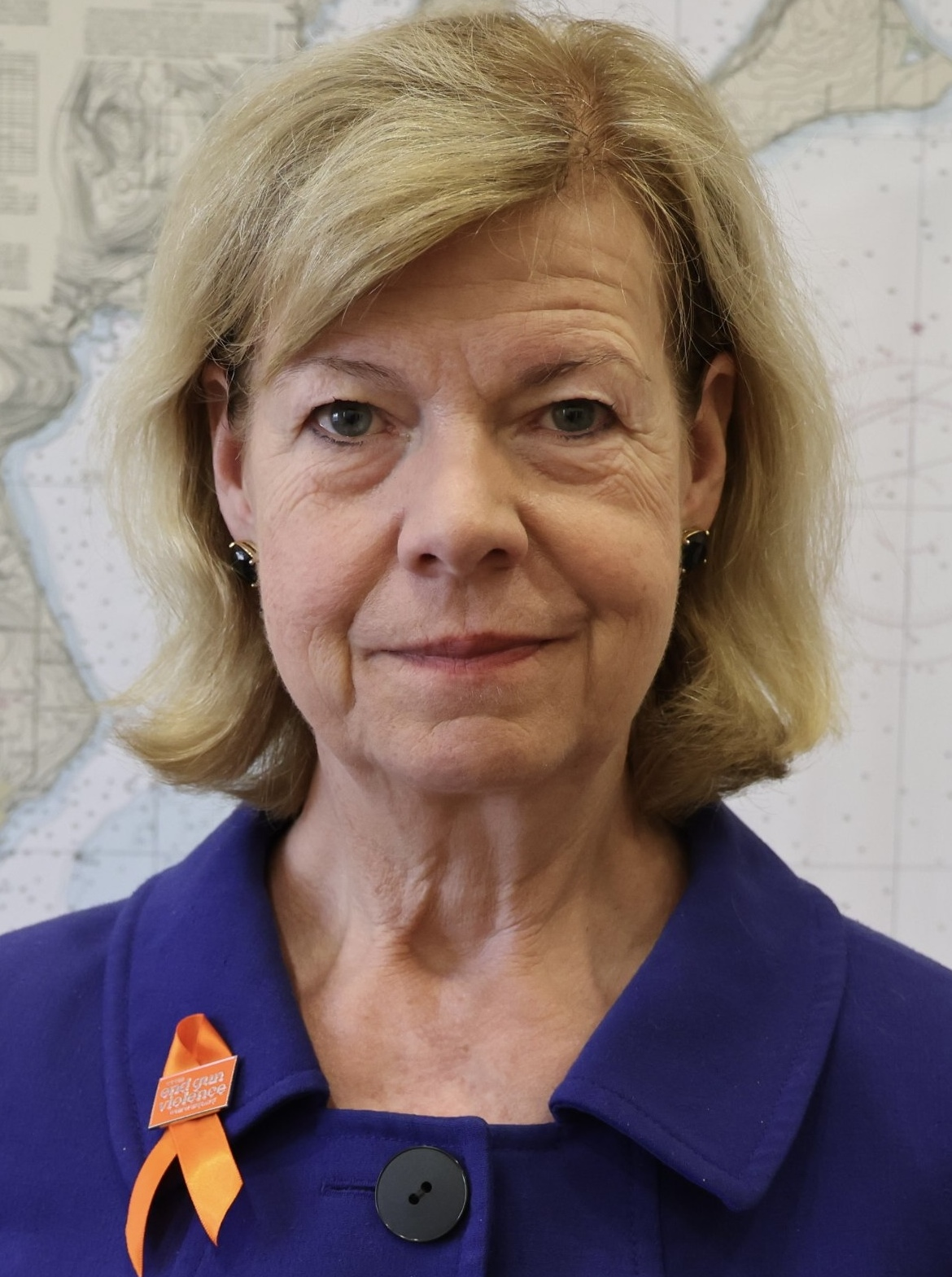

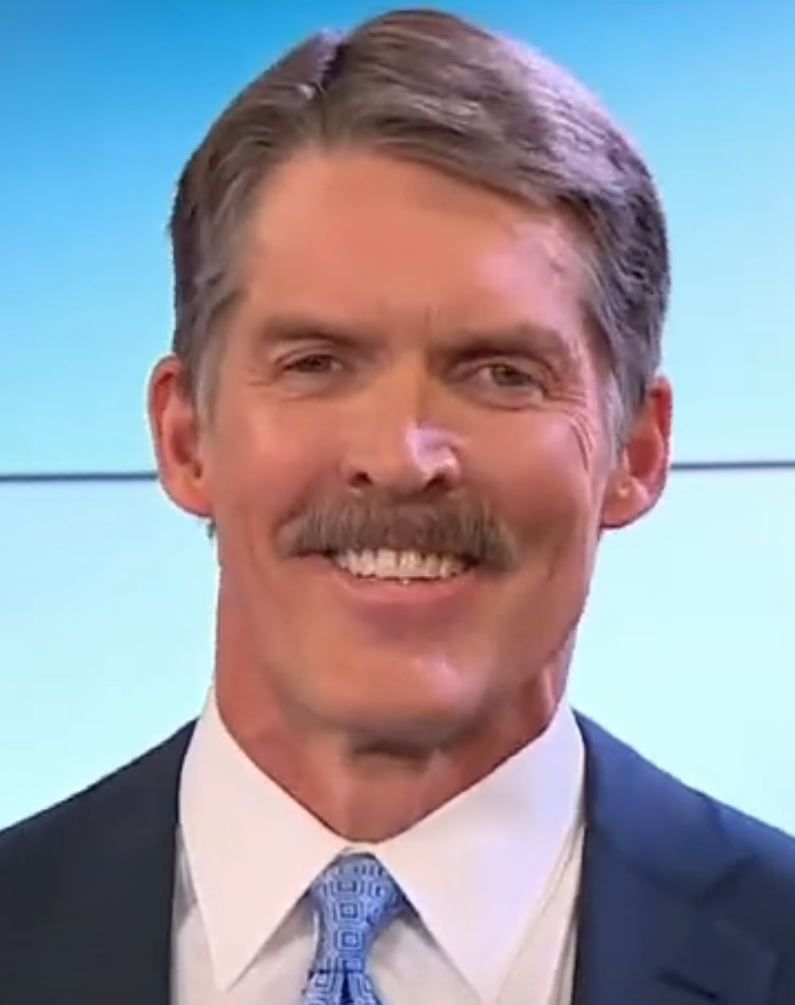
Nominee	Tammy Baldwin	Eric Hovde
Party	Democratic	Republican
Popular vote	1,672,777	1,643,996
Percentage	49.33%	48.48%
- Baldwin: 40–50% 50–60% 60–70% 70–80% 80–90% >90% Hovde: 40–50% 50–60% 60–70% 70–80% 80–90% >90% Tie: 40–50% 50%
U.S. senator before election
Tammy Baldwin
Democratic
Elected U.S. Senator
Tammy Baldwin
Democratic

The 2024 United States Senate election in Wisconsin was held on November 5, 2024, to elect a member of the United States Senate to represent the state of Wisconsin. Incumbent Democratic Senator Tammy Baldwin won re-election to a third term by a narrow 0.85% margin, defeating Republican nominee Eric Hovde.

Third-party candidates Phil Anderson and Thomas Leager were seen as potential spoiler candidates for Hovde in a state that had voted for Republican presidential nominee Donald Trump. This was the first time that Wisconsin voted for candidates of different political parties for U.S. senator and president since Democrat Gaylord Nelson was reelected as Republican Richard Nixon carried the state in 1968. The closest of Baldwin's three Senate victories, the race held similarities to Republican Ron Johnson's narrow win in 2022, down to the percentage and raw vote margin by which the incumbents won. It was the closest Senate race in the state since 1914 and the closest election ever for this seat.

Baldwin won only about 4,000 votes more than Kamala Harris, while Hovde received about 55,000 fewer votes than Trump. While almost all of the state's counties swung Republican compared to Baldwin's 2018 victory, Baldwin improved in Waukesha and Ozaukee.

The primary election took place on August 13, 2024. The election was considered essential for Democrats' chances to retain the Senate majority in 2024.

== Background ==
No Republican has won this Senate seat since Joseph McCarthy in 1952. Incumbent Tammy Baldwin was first elected in 2012, defeating former governor Tommy Thompson by 6 percentage points. She was re-elected in 2018 by 11 percentage points.

The race was considered to be slightly favorable to Baldwin, despite Wisconsin's nearly even partisan lean, with most polls showing Baldwin to be the favorite to win.

Wisconsin is considered to be a purple state at the federal level, especially since there is both a Republican and a Democratic senator representing the state. Wisconsin was also a top battleground state in the 2016 and 2020 presidential elections. The state backed the Republican candidate in 2016, and then the Democratic candidate in 2020, both by less than 1% and only a plurality.

Both parties have seen success in the state in recent years. Republicans control both chambers of the Wisconsin Legislature and hold a supermajority in Wisconsin's U.S. House delegation. Republicans also control the state's other Senate seat. However, Democrats had seen success in statewide races, including in 2022, where incumbent governor Tony Evers overperformed expectations and won reelection to a second term, despite polls showing his Republican challenger as the slight favorite.

== Democratic primary ==
=== Candidates ===
==== Nominee ====
- Tammy Baldwin, incumbent U.S. senator

=== Endorsements ===
Tammy Baldwin

U.S. representatives

- Gabby Giffords, AZ-08 (2007–2012)

Governors

- Gretchen Whitmer, governor of Michigan (2019–present)

Individuals

- Harry Dunn, former U.S. Capitol Police officer
- Cristina Tzintzún Ramirez, labor organizer and president of NextGen America PAC (2021–present)

Labor unions

- Actors' Equity Association
- Association of Flight Attendants
- International Brotherhood of Electrical Workers Local 2150
- United Auto Workers
- United Steelworkers District 7
- Wisconsin AFL-CIO

Organizations

- 314 Action
- Bend the Arc
- Council for a Livable World
- EMILY's List
- End Citizens United
- Fair Wisconsin PAC
- Feminist Majority PAC
- Giffords
- Human Rights Campaign
- J Street PAC
- Jewish Democratic Council of America
- Joint Action Committee for Political Affairs
- League of Conservation Voters
- LGBTQ Victory Fund
- LPAC
- NARAL Pro-Choice America
- National Committee to Preserve Social Security and Medicare
- National Women's Political Caucus
- Natural Resources Defense Council
- NextGen America PAC
- People for the American Way
- Planned Parenthood Action Fund
- Population Connection Action Fund
- Stonewall Democratic Club
- Swing Left

=== Fundraising ===
Campaign finance reports as of July 24, 2024
Candidate	Raised	Spent	Cash on hand
Tammy Baldwin (D)	$36,476,704	$30,268,932	$6,349,965
Source: Federal Election Commission

=== Results ===
Democratic primary results
Party	Candidate	Votes	%
Democratic	Tammy Baldwin (incumbent)	639,049	99.81%
Write-in		1,198	0.19%
Total votes		640,247	100.0%

== Republican primary ==
=== Candidates ===
==== Nominee ====
- Eric Hovde, bank executive and candidate for U.S. Senate in 2012

==== Eliminated in primary ====
- Charles Barman, retired construction superintendent and perennial candidate
- Rejani Raveendran, chair of University of Wisconsin–Stevens Point College Republicans

==== Withdrew ====
- Stacey Klein, Trempealeau County supervisor (ran for state senate)
- Patrick Schaefer-Wicke, retired U.S. Army Reserve sergeant major

==== Declined ====
- David Clarke, former Milwaukee County sheriff (2002-2017)
- Mike Gallagher, U.S. representative from Wisconsin's 8th congressional district (2017–2024)
- Scott Mayer, staffing executive and former Indy Racing League driver
- Bryan Steil, U.S. representative from Wisconsin's 1st congressional district (2019–present) (ran for re-election, endorsed Hovde)
- Tom Tiffany, U.S. representative from Wisconsin's 7th congressional district (2020–present) (ran for re-election, endorsed Hovde)
- Scott Walker, former governor of Wisconsin (2011–2019) (endorsed Hovde)

=== Endorsements ===
Eric Hovde

Executive branch officials

- Donald Trump, former president of the United States (2017–2021)

U.S. senators

- Ron Johnson, U.S. senator from Wisconsin (2011–present)

U.S. representatives

- Scott Fitzgerald, U.S. representative from Wisconsin's 5th congressional district (2021–present)
- Glenn Grothman, U.S. representative from Wisconsin's 6th congressional district (2015–present)
- Bryan Steil, U.S. representative from Wisconsin's 1st congressional district (2019–present)
- Tom Tiffany, U.S. representative from Wisconsin's 7th congressional district (2020–present)
- Derrick Van Orden, U.S. representative from Wisconsin's 3rd congressional district (2023–present)

Statewide officials

- Scott Walker, former governor of Wisconsin (2011–2019)

Organizations

- Americans for Prosperity
- National Republican Senatorial Committee
- Republican Party of Wisconsin
- University of Wisconsin–Madison College Republicans
- Wisconsin Federation of College Republicans
- Wisconsin Young Republicans

=== Fundraising ===
Campaign finance reports as of July 24, 2024
Candidate	Raised	Spent	Cash on hand
Eric Hovde (R)	$16,788,769 (Note: $13,000,000 of this total was self-funded by Hovde.)	$13,609,814	$3,178,955
Rejani Raveendran (R)	$39,888 (Note: $10,000 of this total was self-funded by Raveendran.)	$38,695	$1,192
Stacey Klein (R) (Note: Withdrew)	$33,712	$33,712	$0
Source: Federal Election Commission

=== Polling ===
Hypothetical polling

Poll source	Date(s) administered	Sample size (Note: Key: A – all adults RV – registered voters LV – likely voters V – unclear)	Margin of error	David Clarke	Mike Gallagher	Eric Hovde	Scott Mayer	Tom Tiffany	Undecided
Public Policy Polling (D)	December 11–12, 2023	503 (LV)	± 4.4%	52%	–	7%	6%	–	36%
Public Policy Polling (D)	December 11–12, 2023	503 (LV)	± 4.4%	51%	–	10%	–	–	39%
Public Policy Polling (D)	December 11–12, 2023	503 (LV)	± 4.4%	52%	–	–	6%	–	42%
Public Policy Polling (D)	June 5–6, 2023	507 (LV)	± 4.4%	40%	20%	3%	–	10%	27%
Public Policy Polling (D)	June 5–6, 2023	507 (LV)	± 4.4%	45%	26%	–	–	–	29%

=== Results ===
Republican primary results
Party	Candidate	Votes	%
Republican	Eric Hovde	477,197	86.21%
Republican	Charles Barman	40,990	7.40%
Republican	Rejani Raveendran	34,612	6.25%
Write-in		748	0.14%
Total votes		553,547	100.0%

== Independent candidates ==
=== Candidates ===
==== Declared ====
- Phil Anderson (Disrupt The Corruption), realtor, former chair of the Wisconsin Libertarian Party, and perennial candidate
- Thomas Leager (America First), lobbyist

== General election ==
=== Predictions ===
Source	Ranking	As of
The Cook Political Report	Tossup	October 8, 2024
Inside Elections	Tilt D	September 26, 2024
Sabato's Crystal Ball	Lean D	September 25, 2024
Decision Desk HQ/The Hill	Tossup	September 26, 2024
Elections Daily	Lean D	August 9, 2024
CNalysis	Lean D	November 4, 2024
RealClearPolitics	Tossup	September 15, 2024
Split Ticket	Lean D	October 23, 2024
538	Lean D	October 24, 2024

=== Post-primary endorsements ===
Eric Hovde (R)

U.S. senators

- John Thune, Senate minority whip (2021–2025) from South Dakota (2005–present)

Individuals

- Robert F. Kennedy Jr., independent candidate for president in 2024
- Ben Shapiro, editor emeritus of The Daily Wire
Tammy Baldwin (D)

Executive branch officials

- Kamala Harris, vice president of the United States (2021–2025)

Individuals

- Cardi B, rapper

Newspapers

- The Capital Times
- Wisconsin State Journal

Organizations

- Wisconsin Farm Bureau Federation

=== Debates ===
2024 Wisconsin U.S. Senate election debate
No.	Date	Host	Moderators	Link	Democratic	Republican
Key: P Participant A Absent N Not invited I Invited W Withdrawn						
Key: P Participant A Absent N Not invited I Invited W Withdrawn					Baldwin	Hovde
1	October 18, 2024	WMTV	Jill Geisler	YouTube	P	P

=== Polling ===
Aggregate polls

Source of poll aggregation	Dates administered	Dates updated	Tammy Baldwin (D)	Eric Hovde (R)	Undecided (Note: Calculated by taking the difference of 100% and all other candidates combined.)	Margin
FiveThirtyEight	through November 4, 2024	November 4, 2024	49.3%	47.1%	3.6%	Baldwin +2.2
Real Clear Politics	October 16 – November 4, 2024	November 4, 2024	48.9%	47.1%	4.0%	Baldwin +1.8
270toWin	October 23 – November 4, 2024	November 4, 2024	48.9%	46.9%	4.2%	Baldwin +2.0
TheHill/DDHQ	through November 4, 2024	November 4, 2024	48.6%	47.9%	3.5%	Baldwin +0.7
Average			48.9%	47.3%	3.8%	Baldwin+1.6

Poll source	Date(s) administered	Sample size	Margin of error	Tammy Baldwin (D)	Eric Hovde (R)	Other	Undecided
AtlasIntel	November 3–4, 2024	869 (LV)	± 3.0%	49%	48%	1% (Note: "Blank/Null/Won't vote" with 1%)	2%
Research Co.	November 2–3, 2024	450 (LV)	± 4.6%	48%	47%	2% (Note: "Some other candidate" with 2%)	3%
Patriot Polling (R)	November 1–3, 2024	835 (RV)	± 3.0%	51%	49%	–	–
The Trafalgar Group (R)	November 1–3, 2024	1,086 (LV)	± 2.9%	48%	48%	–	4%
InsiderAdvantage (R)	November 1–2, 2024	800 (LV)	± 3.4%	47%	48%	3%	2%
AtlasIntel	November 1–2, 2024	728 (LV)	± 4.0%	49%	48%	1%	2%
Emerson College (Note: Poll sponsored by The Hill)	October 30 – November 2, 2024	800 (LV)	± 3.4%	51%	45%	–	4%
New York Times/Siena College	October 25 – November 2, 2024	1,001 (LV)	± 3.4%	50%	46%	–	5%
New York Times/Siena College	October 25 – November 2, 2024	1,001 (RV)	± 3.6%	50%	46%	–	4%
Mainstreet Research/FAU	October 25 – November 2, 2024	786 (LV)	± 3.6%	47%	45%	3% (Note: "Another candidate" with 3%)	4%
Mainstreet Research/FAU	October 25 – November 2, 2024	798 (RV)	± 3.5%	47%	45%	3%	5%
Morning Consult	October 23 – November 1, 2024	541 (LV)	± 4.0%	49%	47%	–	4%
AtlasIntel	October 30–31, 2024	673 (LV)	± 4.0%	49%	49%	1%	1%
YouGov (Note: Poll conducted for The Times, Stanford University, Arizona State University, and Yale University)	October 25–31, 2024	863 (LV)	± 4.5%	50%	45%	–	5%
OnMessage Inc. (R)	October 29–31, 2024	800 (LV)	–	48%	47%	–	5%
ActiVote	October 6–31, 2024	400 (LV)	± 4.9%	54%	46%	–	–
TIPP Insights (R) (Note: Poll sponsored by American Greatness)	October 28–30, 2024	831 (LV)	± 3.5%	48%	46%	1%	4%
TIPP Insights (R)	October 28–30, 2024	1,038 (RV)	± 3.5%	47%	43%	3%	7%
Marist College	October 27–30, 2024	1,330 (LV)	± 3.4%	51%	48%	–	1%
Marist College	October 27–30, 2024	1,444 (RV)	± 3.3%	51%	48%	–	1%
Echelon Insights	October 27–30, 2024	600 (LV)	± 4.5%	49%	48%	1% (Note: "I Did Note Vote For This Office" with 1%)	2%
AtlasIntel	October 25–29, 2024	1,470 (LV)	± 3.0%	49%	48%	2% (Note: "Blank/Null/Won't vote" with 1%; "Other" with 1%)	2%
CNN/SSRS	October 23–28, 2024	736 (LV)	± 4.8%	49%	47%	4% (Note: "Other" with 3%; "Neither" with 1%)	–
InsiderAdvantage (R)	October 26–27, 2024	800 (LV)	± 3.5%	48%	49%	1%	2%
Marquette University	October 16–24, 2024	753 (LV)	± 4.4%	49%	47%	3% (Note: Anderson (I) with 2%; Leager (I) with 1%)	1%
Marquette University	October 16–24, 2024	753 (LV)	± 4.4%	48%	45%	–	7%
Marquette University	October 16–24, 2024	753 (LV)	± 4.4%	51% (Note: With voters who lean towards a given candidate)	49%	–	–
Marquette University	October 16–24, 2024	834 (RV)	± 4.4%	50%	46%	3%	1%
Marquette University	October 16–24, 2024	834 (RV)	± 4.4%	48%	44%	–	8%
Marquette University	October 16–24, 2024	834 (RV)	± 4.4%	51%	49%	–	–
Suffolk University (Note: Poll sponsored by USA Today)	October 20–23, 2024	500 (LV)	± 4.4%	46%	44%	4% (Note: Leager (I) with 2%; Anderson (I) with 1%; "Refused" with 1%)	7%
Emerson College (Note: Poll sponsored by RealClearWorld)	October 21–22, 2024	800 (LV)	± 3.4%	48%	48%	1% (Note: "Someone else" with 1%)	3%
OnMessage Inc. (R) (Note: Poll sponsored by Senate Opportunity Fund, a super PAC that primarily supports Republican candidates in U.S. Senate races)	October 19–22, 2024	600 (LV)	± 4.0%	48%	49%	1% (Note: Anderson (I) with 1%)	3%
Quinnipiac University	October 17–21, 2024	1,108 (LV)	± 2.9%	49%	48%	2% (Note: "Someone else" with 1%; "Refused" with 1%)	1%
The Trafalgar Group (R)	October 18–20, 2024	1,083 (LV)	± 2.9%	48%	49%	–	3%
Redfield & Wilton Strategies (Note: Poll sponsored by The Daily Telegraph)	October 16–18, 2024	622 (LV)	± 3.6%	45%	44%	4% (Note: "Won't vote if these are the candidates" with 2%; Leager (I) and Anderson (I) with 1% each)	8%
The Bullfinch Group	October 11–18, 2024	600 (LV)	± 4.0%	49%	45%	–	7%
AtlasIntel	October 12–17, 2024	932 (LV)	± 3.0%	49%	46%	2%	3%
RMG Research (Note: Poll sponsored by the Napolitan Institute)	October 10–16, 2024	787 (LV)	± 3.5%	49%	46%	3% (Note: "Some other candidate" with 2%; "Would not vote" with 1%)	2%
RMG Research	October 10–16, 2024	787 (LV)	± 3.5%	50%	47%	1% (Note: "Would not vote" with 1%)	2%
Morning Consult	October 6–15, 2024	527 (LV)	± 4.0%	49%	44%	–	7%
Patriot Polling (R)	October 12–14, 2024	803 (RV)	± 3.0%	50%	49%	–	–
InsiderAdvantage (R)	October 8–9, 2024	800 (LV)	± 3.5%	48%	47%	2%	3%
Emerson College	October 5–8, 2024	1,000 (LV)	± 3.0%	50%	46%	–	5%
Research Co.	October 5–7, 2024	450 (LV)	± 4.6%	47%	43%	1% (Note: "Some other candidate" with 1%)	9%
Quinnipiac University	October 3–7, 2024	1,073 (LV)	± 3.0%	50%	46%	2% (Note: "Wouldn't vote" and "Refused" with 1% each)	2%
Redfield & Wilton Strategies	September 27 – October 2, 2024	533 (LV)	± 4.0%	47%	42%	4%	7%
The Trafalgar Group (R)	September 28–30, 2024	1,083 (LV)	± 2.9%	48%	46%	–	6%
ActiVote	August 29 – September 29, 2024	400 (LV)	± 4.9%	54%	46%	–	–
New York Times/Siena College	September 21–26, 2024	680 (LV)	± 4.4%	50%	43%	–	7%
New York Times/Siena College	September 21–26, 2024	680 (RV)	± 4.3%	50%	42%	–	8%
Marquette University	September 18–26, 2024	798 (LV)	± 4.4%	51%	45%	2% (Note: Leager (I) and Anderson (I) with 1%)	1%
Marquette University	September 18–26, 2024	798 (LV)	± 4.4%	48%	43%	–	9%
Marquette University	September 18–26, 2024	798 (LV)	± 4.4%	53%	46%	–	1%
Marquette University	September 18–26, 2024	882 (RV)	± 4.4%	51%	45%	2%	1%
Marquette University	September 18–26, 2024	882 (RV)	± 4.4%	48%	43%	–	9%
Marquette University	September 18–26, 2024	882 (RV)	± 4.4%	53%	46%	–	1%
AtlasIntel	September 20–25, 2024	1,077 (LV)	± 3.0%	48%	47%	3% (Note: "Blank/Null/Won't vote" with 2%; "Other" with 1%)	2%
BSG (R)/GS Strategy Group (D) (Note: Poll sponsored by The Cook Political Report)	September 19–25, 2024	411 (LV)	–	47%	44%	4% (Note: "Someone else" with 2%; "Would not vote" with 2%)	5%
BSG (R)/GS Strategy Group (D)	September 19–25, 2024	411 (LV)	–	49%	47%	–	4%
RMG Research	September 17–23, 2024	788 (LV)	± 3.5%	50%	44%	2% (Note: "Someone else" with 2%)	4%
RMG Research	September 17–23, 2024	788 (LV)	± 3.5%	51%	45%	–	4%
Remington Research Group (R) (Note: Poll sponsored by American Fuel & Petrochemical Manufacturers, a group that supports Republicans.)	September 16–20, 2024	800 (LV)	± 3.5%	49%	47%	–	4%
Redfield & Wilton Strategies	September 16–19, 2024	600 (LV)	± 3.7%	46%	41%	4% (Note: "Won't vote if these are the candidates", "Other", Leager (I) and Anderson (I) with 1%)	8%
Emerson College	September 15–18, 2024	1,000 (LV)	± 3.0%	49%	46%	–	5%
MassINC Polling Group (Note: Poll sponsored by Wisconsin Watch)	September 12–18, 2024	800 (LV)	± 3.8%	52%	44%	1% (Note: "Prefer not to say" with 1%)	2%
Morning Consult	September 9–18, 2024	600 (LV)	± 4.0%	50%	43%	–	7%
Marist College	September 12–17, 2024	1,312 (RV)	± 3.5%	52%	46%	–	1%
Marist College	September 12–17, 2024	1,194 (LV)	± 3.6%	51%	48%	–	1%
Quinnipiac University	September 12–16, 2024	1,075 (LV)	± 3.0%	51%	47%	2%	1%
Fabrizio Ward (R)/ Impact Research (D) (Note: Poll sponsored by AARP)	September 11–14, 2024	600 (LV)	± 4.0%	50%	47%	–	3%
Redfield & Wilton Strategies	September 6–9, 2024	626 (LV)	± 3.7%	46%	39%	4%	12%
Morning Consult	August 30 – September 8, 2024	638 (LV)	± 4.0%	49%	42%	–	9%
co/efficient (R) (Note: Poll sponsored by Americans for IVF)	September 4–6, 2024	917 (LV)	± 3.2%	49%	43%	–	8%
CBS News/YouGov	September 3–6, 2024	944 (LV)	± 4.0%	51%	43%	2%	4%
Marquette University	August 28 – September 5, 2024	822 (RV)	± 4.6%	51%	45%	4% (Note: Leager (I) and Anderson (I) with 2%)	1%
Marquette University	August 28 – September 5, 2024	822 (RV)	± 4.6%	48%	44%	–	8%
Marquette University	August 28 – September 5, 2024	822 (RV)	± 4.6%	52%	48%	–	1%
Marquette University	August 28 – September 5, 2024	738 (LV)	± 4.7%	51%	45%	4%	1%
Marquette University	August 28 – September 5, 2024	738 (LV)	± 4.7%	49%	44%	–	7%
Marquette University	August 28 – September 5, 2024	738 (LV)	± 4.7%	52%	47%	–	1%
YouGov	August 23 – September 3, 2024	900 (RV)	± 4.1%	49%	41%	–	10%
The Trafalgar Group (R)	August 28–30, 2024	1,083 (LV)	± 2.9%	50%	44%	–	6%
CNN/SRSS	August 23–29, 2024	976 (LV)	± 4.4%	51%	45%	3% (Note: "Other" with 2%; "Neither" with 1%)	–
Redfield & Wilton Strategies	August 25–28, 2024	672 (LV)	± 3.5%	46%	41%	3% (Note: Leager with 1%; Anderson with 1%; "Won't vote if these are the candidates" with 1%)	11%
Emerson College	August 25–28, 2024	850 (LV)	± 3.3%	49%	48%	–	3%
BK Strategies (Note: Poll sponsored by Platform Communications)	August 19–21, 2024	600 (LV)	–	49%	44%	–	7%
Fabrizio Ward (Note: Poll sponsored by Pinpoint Policy Institute)	August 19–21, 2024	400 (LV)	± 4.9%	48%	43%	–	9%
TIPP Insights (R)	August 12–14, 2024	1,015 (RV)	± 3.4%	50%	42%	–	8%
TIPP Insights (R)	August 12–14, 2024	976 (LV)	± 3.4%	50%	43%	–	7%
The Bullfinch Group (Note: Poll sponsored by The Independent Center)	August 8–11, 2024	500 (RV)	± 4.4%	50%	41%	–	9%
New York Times/Siena College	August 5–8, 2024	661 (RV)	± 4.3%	51%	43%	–	6%
New York Times/Siena College	August 5–8, 2024	661 (LV)	± 4.3%	51%	44%	–	5%
BSG (R)/GS Strategy Group (D)	July 26 – August 2, 2024	404 (LV)	–	50%	43%	–	7%
Marquette University	July 24 – August 1, 2024	877 (RV)	± 4.6%				
Marquette University	July 24 – August 1, 2024	877 (RV)	± 4.6%	47%	39%	–	14%
Marquette University	July 24 – August 1, 2024	877 (RV)	± 4.6%	53%	46%	–	1%
Marquette University	July 24 – August 1, 2024	877 (RV)	± 4.6%	50%	44%	4% (Note: Anderson with 2%; Leager with 2%)	1%
Marquette University	July 24 – August 1, 2024	801 (LV)	± 4.8%	48%	41%	–	11%
Marquette University	July 24 – August 1, 2024	801 (LV)	± 4.8%	52%	47%	–	1%
Marquette University	July 24 – August 1, 2024	801 (LV)	± 4.8%	51%	45%	4%	1%
Fox News	July 22–24, 2024	1,046 (RV)	± 3.0%	54%	43%	–	3%
Emerson College (Note: Poll sponsored by The Hill and Nexstar)	July 22–23, 2024	845 (RV)	± 3.3%	49%	43%	–	8%
	July 21, 2024	Joe Biden withdraws from the Presidential Race					
YouGov	July 4–12, 2024	900 (RV)	± 4.1%	50%	43%	1% (Note: "Other" with 1%)	7%
YouGov	July 4–12, 2024	831 (LV)	–	50%	44%	1%	5%
Public Policy Polling (D) (Note: Poll sponsored by the Progress Action Fund, which is a sponsor of the Democratic Party.)	July 10–11, 2024	548 (RV)	–	51%	43%	–	6%
North Star Opinion Research (Note: Poll sponsored by American Greatness, a conservative group)	July 6–10, 2024	600 (LV)	± 4.0%	49%	41%	–	10%
Fabrizio Ward (R)/ Impact Research (D)	June 28 – July 2, 2024	600 (LV)	± 4.0%	50%	45%	–	6%
Remington Research Group (R)	June 29 – July 1, 2024	593 (LV)	± 4.0%	48%	48%	–	3%
Marquette University	June 12–20, 2024	871 (RV)	± 4.6%	45%	38%	–	17%
Marquette University	June 12–20, 2024	871 (RV)	± 4.6%	52%	47%	–	–
Marquette University	June 12–20, 2024	784 (LV)	± 4.9%	49%	40%	–	11%
Marquette University	June 12–20, 2024	784 (LV)	± 4.9%	52%	47%	–	–
Emerson College	June 13–18, 2024	1,000 (RV)	± 3.0%	46%	44%	–	10%
Mainstreet Research/FAU	May 30–31, 2024	338 (RV)	± 5.3%	43%	38%	8% (Note: "Another candidate" with 8%)	11%
Mainstreet Research/FAU	May 30–31, 2024	290 (LV)	± 5.3%	47%	39%	7% (Note: "Another candidate" with 7%)	7%
KAConsulting (R) (Note: Poll conducted for Vapor Technology Association)	May 15–19, 2024	600 (RV)	–	46%	42%	–	12%
BSG (R)/GS Strategy Group (D)	May 6–13, 2024	503 (LV)	± 4.4%	49%	37%	–	14%
New York Times/Siena College	April 28 – May 9, 2024	614 (RV)	± 4.0%	49%	40%	–	10%
New York Times/Siena College	April 28 – May 9, 2024	614 (LV)	± 4.0%	49%	42%	–	9%
Quinnipiac University	May 2–6, 2024	1,457 (RV)	± 2.6%	54%	42%	2%	2%
Emerson College	April 25–29, 2024	1,000 (RV)	± 3.0%	46%	43%	–	11%
CBS News/YouGov	April 19–25, 2024	1,245 (LV)	± 3.3%	48%	41%	3% (Note: "Someone else" with 3%)	8%
Marquette University	April 3–10, 2024	814 (RV)	± 4.8%	52%	47%	–	1%
Marquette University	April 3–10, 2024	736 (LV)	± 5.0%	50%	50%	–	–
Emerson College	March 14–18, 2024	1,000 (RV)	± 3.0%	45%	42%	–	14%
Emerson College	February 20–24, 2024	1,000 (RV)	± 3.0%	46%	39%	–	15%

Hypothetical polling

Tammy Baldwin vs. Mike Gallagher

Poll source	Date(s) administered	Sample size	Margin of error	Tammy Baldwin (D)	Mike Gallagher (R)	Undecided
Fabrizio, Lee & Associates (R) (Note: Poll sponsored by the National Republican Senatorial Committee, which supports Gallagher.)	May 23–25, 2023	500 (LV)	± 4.4%	47%	46%	7%

Generic Democrat vs. generic Republican

Poll source	Date(s) administered	Sample size	Margin of error	Generic Democrat	Generic Republican	Undecided
Fabrizio, Lee & Associates (R)	May 23–25, 2023	500 (LV)	± 4.4%	42%	46%	12%

Tammy Baldwin vs. generic opponent

Poll source	Date(s) administered	Sample size	Margin of error	Tammy Baldwin (D)	Generic Opponent	Undecided
Fabrizio, Lee & Associates (R)	May 23–25, 2023	500 (LV)	± 4.4%	40%	43%	17%

=== Fundraising ===
Campaign finance reports as of November 25, 2024
Candidate	Raised	Spent	Cash on hand
Tammy Baldwin (D)	$59,479,375	$59,274,659	$346,908
Eric Hovde (R)	$31,958,427 (Note: $20,000,000 of this total was self-funded by Hovde.)	$31,600,367	$358,060
Phil Anderson (DTC)	$52,738	$52,540	$198
Thomas Leager (AF)	$23,856	$23,721	$175
Source: Federal Election Commission

=== Results ===
2024 United States Senate election in Wisconsin
Party	Candidate	Votes	%	±%
Democratic	Tammy Baldwin (incumbent)	1,672,777	49.33%	−6.03%
Republican	Eric Hovde	1,643,996	48.48%	+3.95%
Disrupt the Corruption	Phil Anderson	42,315	1.25%	N/A
America First	Thomas Leager	28,751	0.85%	N/A
Independent	John Schiess (write-in)	26	0.00%	N/A
Write-in		2,922	0.09%	−0.02%
Total votes		3,390,787	100.00%	N/A
Democratic hold				

==== By county ====
County	Tammy Baldwin Democratic		Eric Hovde Republican		Various candidates Other parties		Margin		Total votes cast
County	#	%	#	%	#	%	#	%	Total votes cast
Adams	4,806	37.67%	7,551	59.18%	402	3.15%	−2,745	−21.51%	12,759
Ashland	4,775	54.02%	3,844	43.49%	220	2.49%	931	10.53%	8,839
Barron	9,352	35.24%	16,462	62.02%	727	2.74%	−7,110	−26.79%	26,541
Bayfield	6,260	56.05%	4,697	42.05%	212	1.90%	1,563	13.99%	11,169
Brown	67,789	45.84%	76,722	51.88%	3,360	2.27%	−8,933	−6.04%	147,871
Buffalo	2,913	36.33%	4,898	61.08%	208	2.59%	−1,985	−24.75%	8,019
Burnett	3,730	34.76%	6,745	62.86%	256	2.39%	−3,015	−28.10%	10,731
Calumet	12,850	39.33%	19,075	58.38%	749	2.29%	−6,225	−19.05%	32,674
Chippewa	14,875	39.09%	22,189	58.31%	991	2.60%	−7,314	−19.22%	38,055
Clark	4,819	31.75%	9,917	65.34%	441	2.91%	−5,098	−33.59%	15,177
Columbia	16,753	48.39%	17,120	49.45%	751	2.17%	−367	−1.06%	34,624
Crawford	4,026	44.53%	4,761	52.65%	255	2.82%	−735	−8.13%	9,042
Dane	273,696	75.31%	84,762	23.32%	4,983	1.37%	188,934	51.98%	363,441
Dodge	16,819	33.71%	31,928	63.99%	1,148	2.30%	−15,109	−30.28%	49,895
Door	10,503	50.48%	9,942	47.78%	363	1.74%	561	2.70%	20,808
Douglas	13,119	52.71%	11,105	44.62%	665	2.67%	2,014	8.09%	24,889
Dunn	10,795	42.54%	13,983	55.10%	598	2.36%	−3,188	−12.56%	25,376
Eau Claire	34,382	55.11%	26,584	42.61%	1,423	2.28%	7,798	12.50%	62,389
Florence	788	25.14%	2,272	72.50%	74	2.36%	−1,484	−47.35%	3,134
Fond du Lac	20,777	35.80%	35,909	61.87%	1,353	2.33%	−15,132	−26.07%	58,039
Forest	1,853	35.70%	3,200	61.65%	138	2.66%	−1,347	−25.95%	5,191
Grant	11,300	41.99%	14,995	55.72%	615	2.29%	−3,695	−13.73%	26,910
Green	11,188	51.01%	10,280	46.87%	466	2.12%	908	4.14%	21,934
Green Lake	3,592	32.70%	7,138	64.97%	256	2.33%	−3,546	−32.28%	10,986
Iowa	7,946	54.55%	6,323	43.41%	297	2.04%	1,623	11.14%	14,566
Iron	1,513	37.49%	2,445	60.58%	78	1.93%	−932	−23.09%	4,036
Jackson	4,314	41.48%	5,764	55.42%	323	3.11%	−1,450	−13.94%	10,401
Jefferson	20,631	41.52%	28,005	56.36%	1,053	2.12%	−7,374	−14.84%	49,689
Juneau	4,991	34.57%	8,993	62.30%	452	3.13%	−4,002	−27.72%	14,436
Kenosha	41,946	46.82%	45,165	50.41%	2,487	2.78%	−3,219	−3.59%	89,598
Kewaunee	4,254	34.37%	7,869	63.57%	255	2.06%	−3,615	−29.21%	12,378
La Crosse	39,268	54.83%	30,746	42.93%	1,601	2.24%	8,522	11.90%	71,615
Lafayette	3,763	42.92%	4,838	55.18%	167	1.90%	−1,075	−12.26%	8,768
Langlade	3,830	33.14%	7,444	64.41%	284	2.46%	−3,614	−31.27%	11,558
Lincoln	6,572	38.45%	10,119	59.20%	401	2.35%	−3,547	−20.75%	17,092
Manitowoc	17,627	38.35%	27,201	59.18%	1,138	2.48%	−9,574	−20.83%	45,966
Marathon	31,883	40.71%	44,779	57.18%	1,650	2.11%	−12,896	−16.47%	78,312
Marinette	7,678	31.82%	15,730	65.19%	721	2.99%	−8,052	−33.37%	24,129
Marquette	3,405	36.34%	5,729	61.14%	237	2.53%	−2,324	−24.80%	9,371
Menominee	1,203	78.37%	288	18.76%	44	2.87%	915	59.61%	1,535
Milwaukee	315,402	68.94%	131,700	28.79%	10,405	2.27%	183,702	40.15%	457,507
Monroe	8,647	37.33%	13,860	59.84%	656	2.83%	−5,213	−22.51%	23,163
Oconto	7,180	29.06%	16,959	68.65%	566	2.29%	−9,779	−39.58%	24,705
Oneida	10,272	41.64%	13,898	56.34%	497	2.01%	−3,626	−14.70%	24,667
Outagamie	49,196	44.28%	59,077	53.17%	2,833	2.55%	−9,881	−8.89%	111,106
Ozaukee	27,208	43.14%	34,914	55.35%	951	1.51%	−7,706	−12.22%	63,073
Pepin	1,591	36.85%	2,636	61.05%	91	2.11%	−1,045	−24.20%	4,318
Pierce	10,407	41.40%	14,172	56.38%	559	2.22%	−3,765	−14.98%	25,138
Polk	9,710	34.76%	17,446	62.46%	775	2.77%	−7,736	−27.70%	27,931
Portage	21,989	51.22%	20,082	46.78%	861	2.01%	1,907	4.44%	42,932
Price	3,181	36.12%	5,424	61.59%	201	2.28%	−2,243	−25.47%	8,806
Racine	49,333	46.27%	54,789	51.38%	2,504	2.35%	−5,456	−5.12%	106,626
Richland	4,111	44.53%	4,912	53.20%	210	2.27%	−801	−8.68%	9,233
Rock	47,080	53.85%	38,097	43.57%	2,257	2.58%	8,983	10.27%	87,434
Rusk	2,548	31.07%	5,372	65.50%	281	3.43%	−2,824	−34.43%	8,201
Sauk	18,429	49.57%	17,895	48.13%	853	2.29%	534	1.44%	37,177
Sawyer	4,621	41.88%	6,208	56.27%	204	1.85%	−1,587	−14.38%	11,033
Shawano	7,549	32.40%	15,052	64.61%	697	2.99%	−7,503	−32.20%	23,298
Sheboygan	27,552	41.18%	37,747	56.42%	1,605	2.40%	−10,195	−15.24%	66,904
St. Croix	23,792	39.63%	34,844	58.05%	1,393	2.32%	−11,052	−18.41%	60,029
Taylor	2,943	26.46%	7,892	70.96%	287	2.58%	−4,949	−44.50%	11,122
Trempealeau	6,424	40.35%	9,118	57.27%	380	2.39%	−2,694	−16.92%	15,922
Vernon	7,765	47.11%	8,312	50.43%	405	2.46%	−547	−3.32%	16,482
Vilas	6,120	38.21%	9,607	59.99%	288	1.80%	−3,487	−21.77%	16,015
Walworth	22,882	38.12%	35,692	59.46%	1,454	2.42%	−12,810	−21.34%	60,028
Washburn	3,916	35.99%	6,724	61.79%	242	2.22%	−2,808	−25.80%	10,882
Washington	28,053	30.92%	61,163	67.40%	1,526	1.68%	−33,110	−36.49%	90,742
Waukesha	105,781	38.65%	163,590	59.77%	4,310	1.57%	−57,809	−21.12%	273,681
Waupaca	10,013	33.26%	19,117	63.50%	977	3.25%	−9,104	−30.24%	30,107
Waushara	4,643	32.58%	9,253	64.93%	354	2.48%	−4,610	−32.35%	14,250
Winnebago	44,721	47.32%	47,265	50.02%	2,515	2.66%	−2,544	−2.69%	94,501
Wood	17,134	40.96%	23,662	56.57%	1,035	2.47%	−6,528	−15.61%	41,831
Totals	1,672,777	49.33%	1,643,996	48.48%	74,014	2.18%	28,781	0.85%	3,390,787

==== Counties that flipped from Democratic to Republican ====
- Columbia (largest city: Portage)
- Kenosha (largest city: Kenosha)
- Lafayette (largest city: Darlington)
- Racine (largest city: Racine)
- Outagamie (largest city: Appleton)
- Brown (largest city: Green Bay)
- Crawford (largest city: Prairie du Chien)
- Dunn (largest city: Menomonie)
- Grant (largest city: Platteville)
- Pierce (largest city: River Falls)
- Richland (largest city: Richland Center)
- Trempealeau (largest city: Arcadia)
- Vernon (largest city: Viroqua)
- Winnebago (largest city: Oshkosh)

==== By congressional district ====
Despite losing the state, Hovde won six of eight congressional districts.

District	Baldwin	Hovde	Representative
1st	47.5%	50.1%	Bryan Steil
2nd	69.9%	28.6%	Mark Pocan
3rd	46.8%	50.8%	Derrick Van Orden
4th	75.6%	22.4%	Gwen Moore
5th	37.9%	60.5%	Scott L. Fitzgerald
6th	41.5%	56.2%	Glenn Grothman
7th	39.0%	58.7%	Tom Tiffany
8th	41.6%	56.0%	Tony Wied

== Aftermath ==
The election was widely called for Baldwin by most news outlets, due to her 30,000-vote lead. On November 12, Hovde contested the results and considered requesting a recount. He believed there were voting inconsistencies on the ballot and criticized how absentee ballots were counted in Milwaukee. His criticisms on election integrity received widespread condemnation with calls to concede the race, which he did on November 18. Hovde decided not to request a recount due to potential challenges to do so, while he continued to criticize how absentee votes were counted.

== See also ==
- 2024 United States presidential election
- 2024 United States presidential election in Wisconsin

== Notes ==
Partisan clients
