= 2024 United States House of Representatives elections in Wisconsin =

- November 5, 2024

All 8 Wisconsin seats to the United States House of Representatives
| | Majority party | Minority party |
|---|---|---|
| Party | Republican | Democratic |
| Last election | 6 | 2 |
| Seats won | 6 | 2 |
| Seat change | Steady | Steady |
| Popular vote | 1,701,860 | 1,603,350 |
| Percentage | 51.17% | 48.21% |
| Swing | ▼4.37% | ▲8.11% |

Republican
50–60%
60–70%
70–80%
Democratic
50–60%
60–70%
70–80%

The 2024 United States House of Representatives elections in Wisconsin were held on November 5, 2024, to elect the eight U.S. representatives from the State of Wisconsin, one from each of the state's congressional districts. The elections coincided with the 2024 U.S. presidential election, other elections to the House of Representatives, elections to the United States Senate, and various state and local elections. Primary elections took place on August 13, 2024.

Wisconsin Republican candidates for the U.S. House received a slightly higher combined total of votes than Donald Trump did in his election in the state.

== Results summary ==
=== Statewide ===
| Party | Candi- dates | Votes | | Seats | | |
| Party | Candi- dates | No. | % | No. | +/– | % |
|---|---|---|---|---|---|---|
| Republican Party | 8 | 1,701,860 | 51.17% | 6 | Steady | 75% |
| Democratic Party | 8 | 1,603,350 | 40.10% | 2 | Steady | 25% |
| Independent | 1 | 8,792 | 0.26% | 0 | Steady | 0% |
| Green Party | 1 | 8,191 | 0.25% | 0 | Steady | 0% |
| Write-ins | – | 3,413 | 0.10% | 0 | Steady | 0% |
| Total | 18 | 3,325,606 | 100% | 8 | Steady | 100% |

Popular vote
| Republican | 51.17% |
| Democratic | 48.21% |
| Other | 0.61% |

House seats
| Republican | 75.00% |
| Democratic | 25.00% |

=== District ===
| District | Republican | | Democratic | | Others | | Total | | Result |
| District | Votes | % | Votes | % | Votes | % | Votes | % | Result |
|---|---|---|---|---|---|---|---|---|---|
| District 1 | 212,515 | 54.01% | 172,402 | 43.81% | 8,576 | 2.18% | 393,493 | 100.00% | Republican hold |
| District 2 | 136,357 | 29.82% | 320,317 | 70.05% | 583 | 0.13% | 457,257 | 100.00% | Democratic hold |
| District 3 | 212,064 | 51.32% | 200,808 | 48.60% | 309 | 0.07% | 413,181 | 100.00% | Republican hold |
| District 4 | 74,921 | 22.41% | 249,938 | 74.77% | 9,423 | 2.82% | 334,282 | 100.00% | Democratic hold |
| District 5 | 300,521 | 64.40% | 165,653 | 35.50% | 508 | 0.11% | 466,682 | 100.00% | Republican hold |
| District 6 | 251,889 | 61.23% | 159,042 | 38.66% | 418 | 0.10% | 411,349 | 100.00% | Republican hold |
| District 7 | 273,553 | 63.56% | 156,524 | 36.37% | 307 | 0.07% | 430,384 | 100.00% | Republican hold |
| District 8 | 240,040 | 57.29% | 178,666 | 42.64% | 272 | 0.06% | 418,978 | 100.00% | Republican hold |
| Total | 1,701,860 | 51.17% | 1,603,350 | 48.21% | 20,396 | 0.61% | 3,325,606 | 100.00% | |

== District 1 ==
2024 Wisconsin's 1st congressional district election
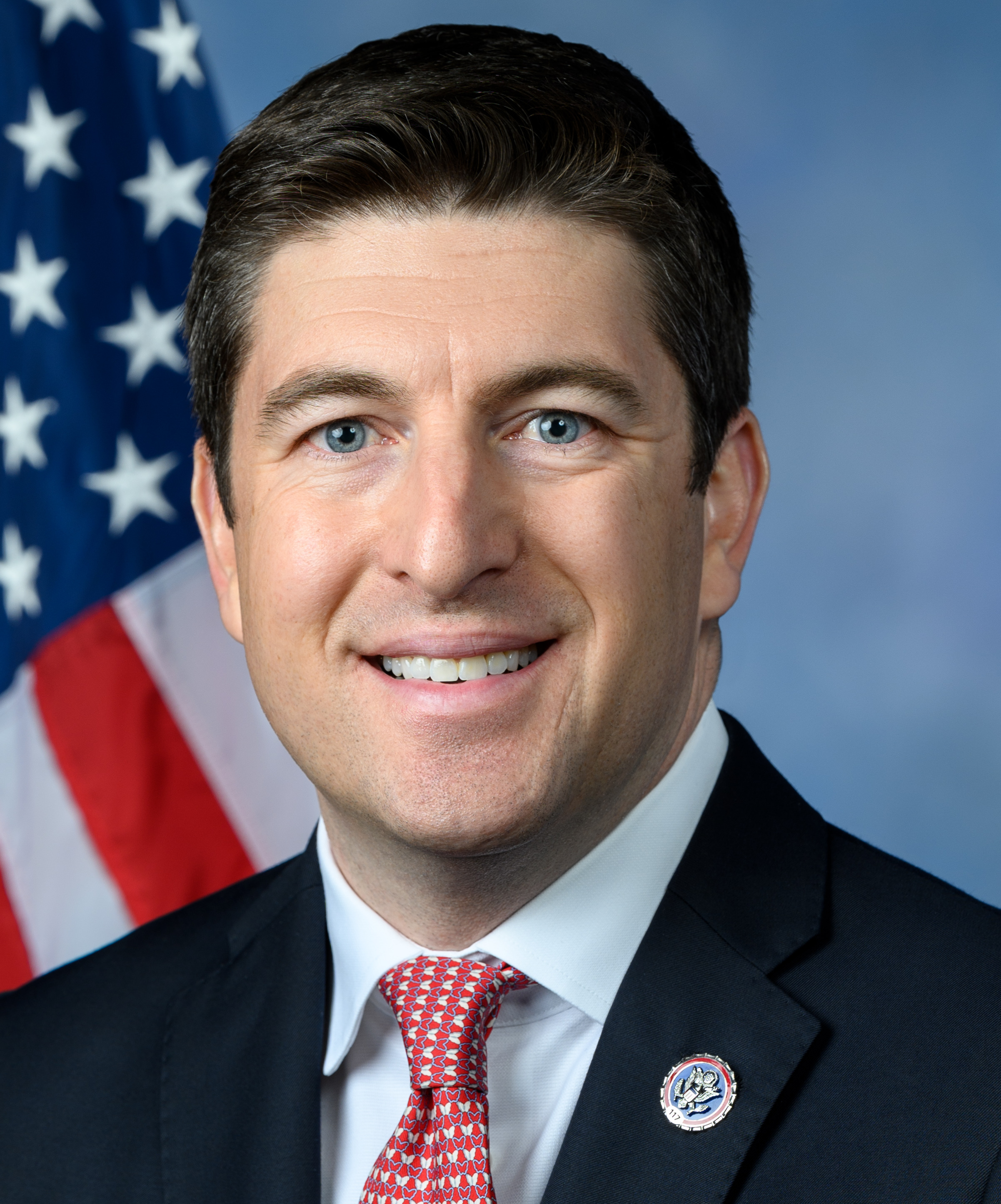

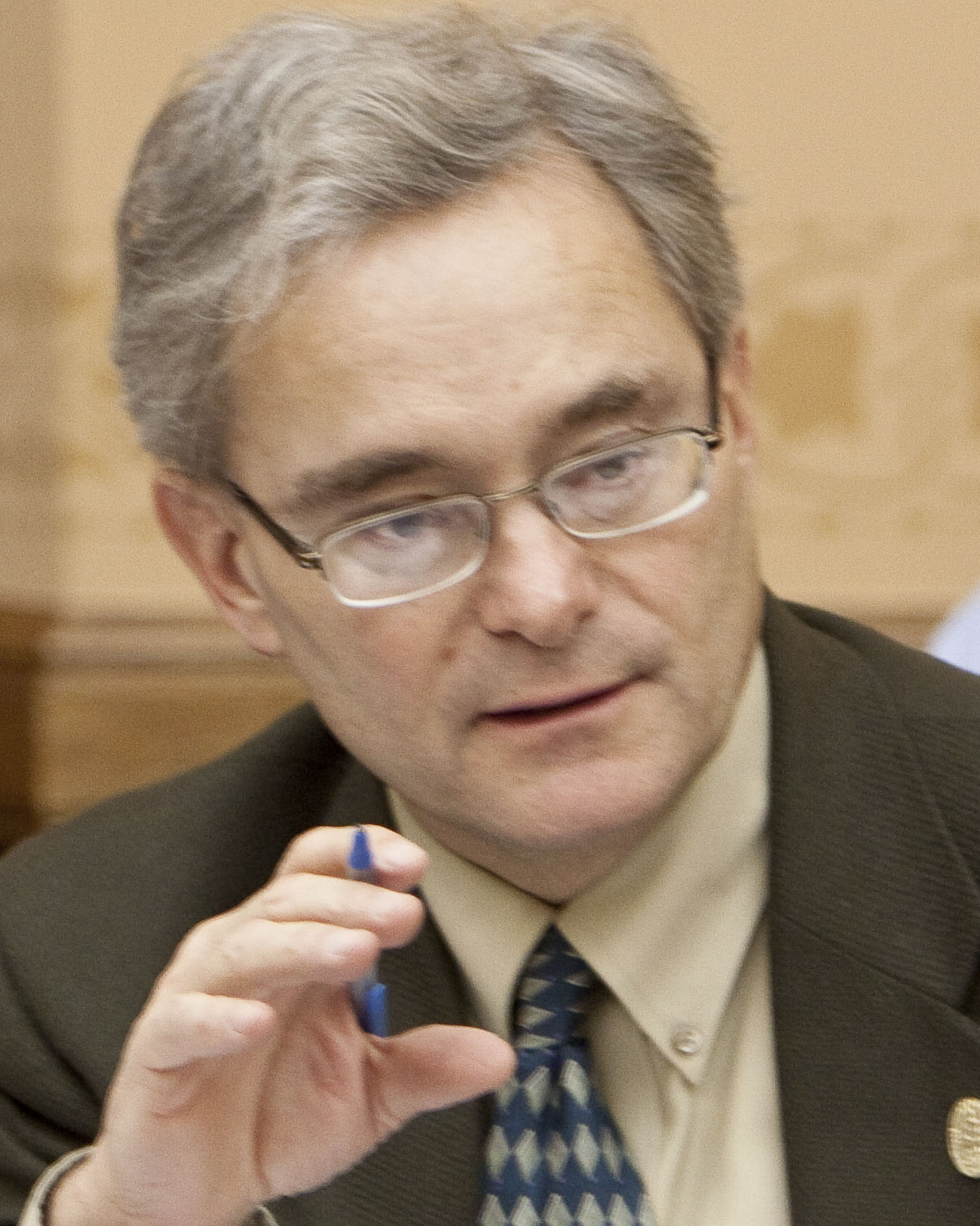
| Nominee | Bryan Steil | Peter Barca |
| Party | Republican | Democratic |
| Popular vote | 212,515 | 172,402 |
| Percentage | 54.0% | 43.8% |
- Steil: 40–50% 50–60% 60–70% 70–80% 80–90% >90% Barca: 40–50% 50–60% 60–70% 70–80% 80–90% >90% Tie: 40–50% 50%
U.S. Representative before election
Bryan Steil
Republican
Elected U.S. Representative
Bryan Steil
Republican

The 1st district encompasses the southeastern corner of Wisconsin, containing the cities of Beloit, Franklin, Janesville, Kenosha, Oak Creek, Racine, and most of Whitewater. The incumbent was Republican Bryan Steil, who was reelected with 54.1% of the vote in 2022.

=== Republican primary ===
==== Candidates ====
===== Nominee =====
- Bryan Steil, incumbent U.S. representative

==== Endorsements ====
Bryan Steil

Organizations

- AIPAC

==== Fundraising ====
Campaign finance reports as of July 24, 2024
| Candidate | Raised | Spent | Cash on hand |
|---|---|---|---|
| Bryan Steil (R) | $4,369,458 | $1,154,579 | $4,726,531 |
Source: Federal Election Commission

==== Results ====
Republican primary results
| Party | Candidate | Votes | % |
|---|---|---|---|
| Republican | Bryan Steil (incumbent) | 52,253 | 99.4 |
| Write-in | | 327 | 0.6 |
| Total votes | | 52,580 | 100.0 |

=== Democratic primary ===
==== Candidates ====
===== Nominee =====
- Peter Barca, former secretary of the Wisconsin Department of Revenue (2019–2024) and former U.S. representative from this district (1993–1995)

===== Withdrawn =====
- Diane Anderson, family nurse practitioner (endorsed Barca)
- Anthony Hammes, former Caledonia village trustee
- Lorenzo Santos, Racine County emergency management coordinator and chair of Wisconsin Young Democrats (ran for Racine County executive, endorsed Barca)

===== Declined =====
- Mike Sheridan, former speaker of the Wisconsin State Assembly (2009–2011) from the 44th district (2005–2011) (endorsed Barca)

==== Endorsements ====
Peter Barca

U.S. representatives

- Gwen Moore, U.S. representative from Wisconsin's 4th congressional district (2005–present)
- Mark Pocan, U.S. representative from Wisconsin's 2nd congressional district (2013–present)

Statewide officials

- Mandela Barnes, former lieutenant governor of Wisconsin (2019–2023)
- Jim Doyle, former governor of Wisconsin (2003–2011)
- Tony Evers, governor of Wisconsin (2019–present)
- Josh Kaul, attorney general of Wisconsin (2019–present)
- Martin Schreiber, former governor of Wisconsin (1977–1979)

State legislators

- Tim Carpenter, state senator for the 3rd district (2003–present)
- Sue Conley, state representative for the 44th district (2021–present)
- Andy Jorgensen, former state representative for 43rd district (2007–2017)
- Tip McGuire, state representative for the 64th district (2019–present)
- Tod Ohnstad, state representative for the 65th district (2013–present)
- Mike Sheridan, former speaker of the Wisconsin State Assembly (2009–2011) from the 44th district (2005–2011)
- Christine Sinicki, state representative for the 20th district (1999–present)
- Mark Spreitzer, state senator for the 15th district (2023–present)
- John Steinbrink, former state representative from the 65th district (1997–2013)
- Gretchen Whitmer, governor of Michigan (2019–present)

County officials

- James Kreuser, former Kenosha County executive (2008–2022)
- Lorenzo Santos, Racine County emergency management coordinator and former candidate for this district

Local officials

- John Antaramian, former mayor of Kenosha (1992–2008, 2016–2024)
- Cory Mason, mayor of Racine (2017–present)

Labor unions

- Wisconsin AFL-CIO

==== Fundraising ====
Campaign finance reports as of July 24, 2024
| Candidate | Raised | Spent | Cash on hand |
|---|---|---|---|
| Peter Barca (D) | $917,147 | $262,608 | $654,538 |
| Lorenzo Santos (D) (Note: Withdrew) | $24,332 | $22,317 | $2,234 |
Source: Federal Election Commission

==== Results ====
Democratic primary results
| Party | Candidate | Votes | % |
|---|---|---|---|
| Democratic | Peter Barca | 59,758 | 99.8 |
| Write-in | | 103 | 0.2 |
| Total votes | | 59,861 | 100.0 |

=== General election ===
==== Predictions ====
| Source | Ranking | As of |
|---|---|---|
| The Cook Political Report | Likely R | September 6, 2024 |
| Inside Elections | Likely R | June 20, 2024 |
| Sabato's Crystal Ball | Likely R | July 31, 2024 |
| Elections Daily | Safe R | August 26, 2024 |
| CNalysis | Likely R | August 18, 2024 |
| Decision Desk HQ | Likely R | October 22, 2024 |

==== Fundraising ====
Campaign finance reports as of October 16, 2024
| Candidate | Raised | Spent | Cash on hand |
|---|---|---|---|
| Bryan Steil (R) | $5,317,032 | $4,554,684 | $2,273,999 |
| Peter Barca (D) | $1,984,191 | $1,851,179 | $133,012 |
Source: Federal Election Commission

==== Polling ====
| Poll source | Date(s) administered | Sample size (Note: Key: A – all adults RV – registered voters LV – likely voters V – unclear) | Margin of error | Bryan Steil (R) | Peter Barca (D) | Undecided |
|---|---|---|---|---|---|---|
| WPA Intelligence (R) (Note: Poll sponsored by the Congressional Leadership Fund) | October 8–10, 2024 | 411 (LV) | ± 4.8% | 52% | 42% | 6% (Note: Todd (G) with 1%) |
| DCCC (D) | October 1–2, 2024 | 725 (LV) | ± 3.6% | 49% | 46% | 5% |

==== Results ====
2024 Wisconsin’s 1st congressional district election
| Party | Candidate | Votes | % |
|---|---|---|---|
| Republican | Bryan Steil (incumbent) | 212,515 | 54.0 |
| Democratic | Peter Barca | 172,402 | 43.8 |
| Green | Chester Todd Jr. | 8,191 | 2.1 |
| Write-in | | 385 | 0.1 |
| Total votes | | 393,493 | 100.0 |
| Republican hold | | | |

== District 2 ==
2024 Wisconsin's 2nd congressional district election
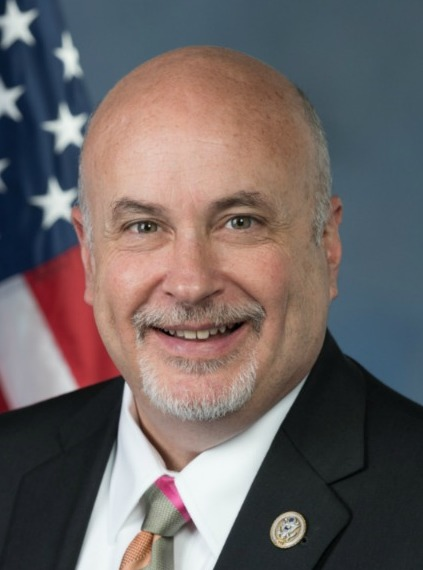

| Nominee | Mark Pocan | Erik Olsen |
| Party | Democratic | Republican |
| Popular vote | 320,317 | 136,357 |
| Percentage | 70.1% | 29.8% |
- Pocan: 50–60% 60–70% 70–80% 80–90% >90% Olsen: 50–60% 60–70% 70–80% >90% 50% No votes
U.S. Representative before election
Mark Pocan
Democratic
Elected U.S. Representative
Mark Pocan
Democratic

The 2nd district contains much of southern Wisconsin, including Madison, Monroe, Dodgeville, and Baraboo. The incumbent was Democrat Mark Pocan, who was reelected with 71% of the vote in 2022.

=== Democratic primary ===
==== Candidates ====
===== Nominee =====
- Mark Pocan, incumbent U.S. representative

=== Endorsements ===
Mark Pocan

Individuals

- Kelley Robinson, president of Human Rights Campaign

Organizations

- Bend the Arc
- Fair Wisconsin
- Human Rights Campaign
- Humane Society Legislative Fund
- J Street PAC
- Peace Action
- Planned Parenthood Action Fund
- Population Connection Action Fund
- Sierra Club

Labor unions

- Association of Flight Attendants
- National Union of Healthcare Workers
- United Auto Workers

==== Fundraising ====
Campaign finance reports as of July 24, 2024
| Candidate | Raised | Spent | Cash on hand |
|---|---|---|---|
| Mark Pocan (D) | $709,474 | $834,658 | $867,505 |
Source: Federal Election Commission

==== Results ====
Democratic primary results
| Party | Candidate | Votes | % |
|---|---|---|---|
| Democratic | Mark Pocan (incumbent) | 149,581 | 99.8 |
| Write-in | | 316 | 0.2 |
| Total votes | | 149,897 | 100.0 |

=== Republican primary ===
==== Candidates ====
===== Nominee =====
- Erik Olsen, attorney and nominee for this district in 2022

===== Eliminated in primary =====
- Charity Barry, grounds crew supervisor and candidate for this district in 2022

==== Fundraising ====
Campaign finance reports as of July 31, 2024
| Candidate | Raised | Spent | Cash on hand |
|---|---|---|---|
| Charity Barry (R) | $119,782 (Note: $2,838 of this total was self-funded by Barry.) | $105,251 | $19,106 |
| Erik Olsen (R) | $81,528 (Note: $13,093 of this total was self-funded by Olsen.) | $59,077 | $11,811 |
Source: Federal Election Commission

==== Results ====
Primary results by county: Olsen: 50–60%; 60–70%; Barry: 50–60%

Republican primary results
| Party | Candidate | Votes | % |
|---|---|---|---|
| Republican | Erik Olsen | 23,035 | 56.1 |
| Republican | Charity Barry | 17,897 | 43.6 |
| Write-in | | 110 | 0.3 |
| Total votes | | 41,042 | 100.0 |

=== General election ===
==== Predictions ====
| Source | Ranking | As of |
|---|---|---|
| The Cook Political Report | Solid D | September 6, 2024 |
| Inside Elections | Solid D | June 20, 2024 |
| Sabato's Crystal Ball | Safe D | July 31, 2024 |
| Elections Daily | Safe D | August 26, 2024 |
| CNalysis | Solid D | August 18, 2024 |
| Decision Desk HQ | Safe D | October 22, 2024 |

==== Fundraising ====
Campaign finance reports as of October 16, 2024
| Candidate | Raised | Spent | Cash on hand |
|---|---|---|---|
| Mark Pocan (D) | $967,114 | $993,270 | $966,533 |
| Erik Olsen (R) | $168,106 (Note: $13,093 of this total was self-funded by Olsen.) | $141,471 | $9,180 |
Source: Federal Election Commission

==== Results ====
2024 Wisconsin's 2nd congressional district election
| Party | Candidate | Votes | % |
|---|---|---|---|
| Democratic | Mark Pocan (incumbent) | 320,317 | 70.1 |
| Republican | Erik Olsen | 136,357 | 29.8 |
| Write-in | | 583 | 0.1 |
| Total votes | | 457,257 | 100.0 |
| Democratic hold | | | |

== District 3 ==
2024 Wisconsin's 3rd congressional district election
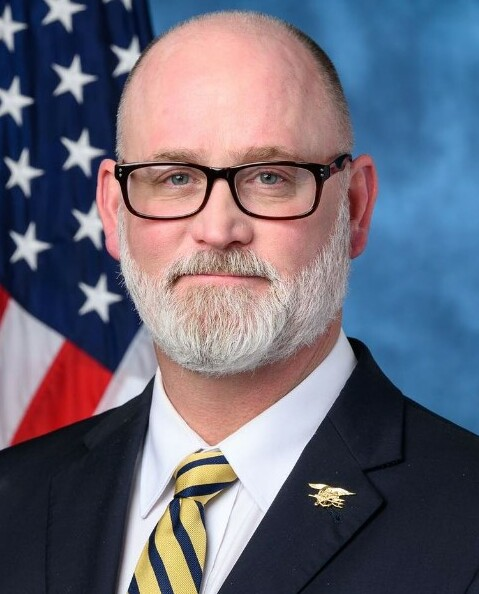

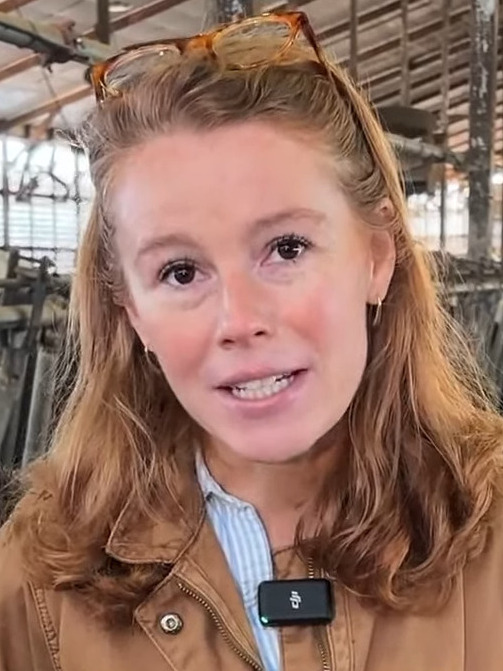
| Nominee | Derrick Van Orden | Rebecca Cooke |
| Party | Republican | Democratic |
| Popular vote | 212,064 | 200,808 |
| Percentage | 51.3% | 48.6% |
- Van Orden: 50–60% 60–70% 70–80% >90% Cooke: 50–60% 60–70% 70–80% 80–90% Tie: 50%
U.S. Representative before election
Derrick Van Orden
Republican
Elected U.S. Representative
Derrick Van Orden
Republican

The 3rd district takes in the Driftless Area in southwestern Wisconsin including Eau Claire and La Crosse. The incumbent was Republican Derrick Van Orden, who flipped the district and was elected with 51.8% of the vote in 2022.

=== Republican primary ===
==== Candidates ====
===== Nominee =====
- Derrick Van Orden, incumbent U.S. representative (2023–present)

==== Endorsements ====
Derrick Van Orden

Executive branch officials

- Donald Trump, former president of the United States (2017–2021)

Organizations

- AIPAC

==== Fundraising ====
Campaign finance reports as of July 24, 2024
| Candidate | Raised | Spent | Cash on hand |
|---|---|---|---|
| Derrick Van Orden (R) | $4,779,789 | $2,489,085 | $2,468,369 |
Source: Federal Election Commission

==== Results ====
Republican primary results
| Party | Candidate | Votes | % |
|---|---|---|---|
| Republican | Derrick Van Orden (incumbent) | 52,533 | 99.6 |
| Write-in | | 211 | 0.4 |
| Total votes | | 52,744 | 100.0 |

=== Democratic primary ===
==== Nominee ====
- Rebecca Cooke, former Wisconsin Economic Development Corporation board member and candidate for this district in 2022

===== Eliminated in primary =====
- Katrina Shankland, state representative from the 71st district (2013–present)
- Eric Wilson, healthcare and real estate worker

===== Withdrawn =====
- Tara Johnson, former chair of the La Crosse County Board (ran for state assembly)
- Aaron Nytes, Harvard Law student (endorsed Cooke)

===== Declined =====
- Deb McGrath, former CIA officer, daughter of former U.S. representative Alvin Baldus, and candidate for this district in 2022 (endorsed Shankland)
- Brad Pfaff, state senator and nominee for this district in 2022 (ran for re-election)

==== Endorsements ====
Rebecca Cooke

U.S. representatives

- Sharice Davids, KS-03 (2019–present)
- Jared Golden, ME-02 (2019–present)
- Raul Ruiz, CA-25 (2023–present)
- Brad Schneider, IL-10 (2013–2015, 2017–present)
- Mike Thompson, CA-04 (1999–present)

Organizations

- Blue Dog Coalition
- Jewish Democratic Council of America
- NewDem Action Fund
- Patriotic Millionaires

Labor unions

- American Postal Workers Union
- Communications Workers of America District 4
- Service Employees International Union-Wisconsin
Katrina Shankland

U.S. representatives

- Gwen Moore, WI-04 (2005–present)
- Dave Obey, former WI-07 (1969–2011)
- Mark Pocan, WI-02 (2013–present)
- Eric Sorensen, IL-17 (2023–present)

State legislators

- 2 state senators (Note: Jeff Smith, SD-31 (2019–present); Kathleen Vinehout, SD-31 (2007–2019))
- 4 state assemblymembers (Note: Jill Billings, AD-95 (2011–present); Chris Danou, AD-92 (2009–2017); Steve Doyle, AD-94 (2011–present); Dana Wachs, AD-91 (2013–2019))

Organizations

- End Citizens United
- League of Conservation Voters
- Progressive Change Campaign Committee

Labor unions

- American Federation of State, County and Municipal Employees Wisconsin Council 32
- American Federation of Teachers–Wisconsin and Local 6505
- Bricklayers and Allied Craftworkers of Wisconsin
- Brotherhood of Locomotive Engineers and Trainmen Wislb
- International Association of Fire Fighters Local 425 & Local 484
- International Brotherhood of Electrical Workers Wisconsin State Conference
- Iron Workers Local 383
- United Auto Workers
- United Food and Commercial Workers Local 1473
- Wisconsin Education Association Council
Eric Wilson

U.S. representatives

- Ro Khanna, CA-17 (2017–present)

Individuals

- Howie Klein, former president of Reprise Records (1989–2001) and adjunct professor at McGill University
- Heather Digby Parton, political blogger
Tara Johnson (withdrawn)

Statewide officials

- Sarah Godlewski, Wisconsin secretary of state (2023–present)

State legislators

- Melissa Agard, former minority leader of the Wisconsin Senate (2023) from SD-16 (2021–present)
- ~~Steve Doyle, AD-94 (2011–present)~~ (switched endorsement to Shankland after Johnson withdrew)

==== Polling ====
| Poll source | Date(s) administered | Sample size | Margin of error | Rebecca Cooke | Tara Johnson | Aaron Nytes | Katrina Shankland | Eric Wilson | Undecided |
|---|---|---|---|---|---|---|---|---|---|
| QGR Research (D) (Note: Poll commissioned by Cooke's campaign) | June 10–16, 2024 | 335 (LV) | ± 5.3% | 38% | -- | -- | 25% | 4% | 33% |
| Blueprint Polling (D) (Note: Poll commissioned by Shankland's campaign) | October 20–23, 2023 | 360 (LV) | ± 5.16% | 21% | 11% | 0.5% | 18% | -- | 50.5% |

==== Fundraising ====
Campaign finance reports as of July 24, 2024
| Candidate | Raised | Spent | Cash on hand |
|---|---|---|---|
| Rebecca Cooke (D) | $2,007,509 | $1,416,946 | $590,562 |
| Katrina Shankland (D) | $867,511 | $677,850 | $189,660 |
| Eric Wilson (D) | $181,669 | $152,395 | $29,274 |
| Tara Johnson (D) | $214,530 | $214,530 | $0 |
Source: Federal Election Commission

==== Results ====
Primary results by county: Cooke: 40–50%; 50–60%; 50–60%; 60–70%; Shankland: 60–70%; 80–90%

Democratic primary results
| Party | Candidate | Votes | % |
|---|---|---|---|
| Democratic | Rebecca Cooke | 42,316 | 50.5 |
| Democratic | Katrina Shankland | 34,812 | 41.6 |
| Democratic | Eric Wilson | 6,624 | 7.9 |
| Write-in | | 24 | 0.0 |
| Total votes | | 83,776 | 100.0 |

=== General election ===
==== Predictions ====
| Source | Ranking | As of |
|---|---|---|
| The Cook Political Report | Lean R | September 6, 2024 |
| Inside Elections | Tilt R | October 31, 2024 |
| Sabato's Crystal Ball | Lean R | September 19, 2024 |
| Elections Daily | Lean R | August 26, 2024 |
| CNalysis | Tilt R | November 4, 2024 |
| Decision Desk HQ | Lean R | October 22, 2024 |

==== Post-primary endorsements ====
Rebecca Cooke (D)

U.S. representatives

- Ron Kind, former WI-03 (1997–2023)

Statewide officials

- Sarah Godlewski, Wisconsin secretary of state (2023–present)

State legislators

- Adrian Boafo, Maryland's HD-23 (2023–present)
- Brad Pfaff, SD-32 (2021–present) and nominee for this district in 2022
- Katrina Shankland, AD-71 (2013–present) and canddiate for this district in 2024

Labor unions

- Wisconsin AFL-CIO

Organizations

- EMILY's List
- Everytown for Gun Safety

==== Polling ====
| Poll source | Date(s) administered | Sample size | Margin of error | Derrick Van Orden (R) | Rebecca Cooke (D) | Undecided |
|---|---|---|---|---|---|---|
| Normington, Petts & Associates (D) (Note: Poll sponsored by the Democratic Congressional Campaign Committee) | October 3–7, 2024 | 400 (LV) | ± 4.9% | 48% | 49% | 3% |
| Public Opinion Strategies (R) (Note: Poll sponsored by the Congressional Leadership Fund (super PAC)) | September 21–23, 2024 | 400 (LV) | ± 4.9% | 49% | 44% | 7% |
| GBAO (D) (Note: Poll sponsored by the House Majority PAC) | September 8–10, 2024 | 400 (LV) | ± 4.9% | 47% | 49% | 4% |
| | August 13, 2024 | Primary elections | | | | |
| GQR Research (D) | June 10–16, 2024 | 400 (LV) | ± 4.9% | 50% | 46% | 4% |
| Blueprint Polling (D) | February 2–4, 2024 | 326 (LV) | ± 5.43% | 50% | 45% | 5% |

Hypothetical polling

Derrick Van Orden vs. Katrina Shankland

| Poll source | Date(s) administered | Sample size | Margin of error | Derrick Van Orden (R) | Katrina Shankland (D) | Undecided |
|---|---|---|---|---|---|---|
| Blueprint Polling (D) | February 2–4, 2024 | 326 (LV) | ± 5.43% | 49% | 47% | 5% |

==== Fundraising ====
Campaign finance reports as of October 16, 2024
| Candidate | Raised | Spent | Cash on hand |
|---|---|---|---|
| Derrick Van Orden (R) | $6,627,346 | $5,751,973 | $1,053,038 |
| Rebecca Cooke (D) | $5,300,456 | $4,939,304 | $361,151 |
Source: Federal Election Commission

==== Results ====
2024 Wisconsin's 3rd congressional district election
| Party | Candidate | Votes | % |
|---|---|---|---|
| Republican | Derrick Van Orden (incumbent) | 212,064 | 51.3 |
| Democratic | Rebecca Cooke | 200,808 | 48.6 |
| Write-in | | 309 | 0.1 |
| Total votes | | 413,181 | 100.0 |
| Republican hold | | | |

== District 4 ==
2024 Wisconsin's 4th congressional district election
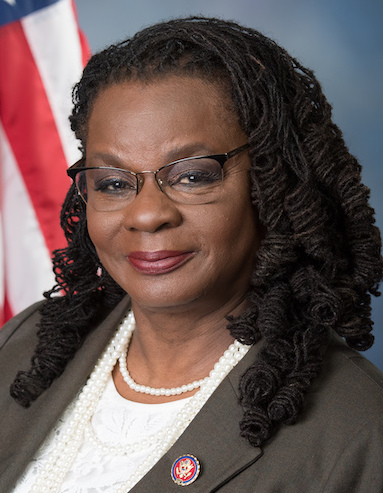

| Nominee | Gwen Moore | Tim Rogers |
| Party | Democratic | Republican |
| Popular vote | 249,938 | 74,921 |
| Percentage | 74.8% | 22.4% |
- Moore: 40–50% 50–60% 60–70% 70–80% 80–90% >90% Rogers: 40–50% 60–70% Tie: 40–50%
U.S. Representative before election
Gwen Moore
Democratic
Elected U.S. Representative
Gwen Moore
Democratic

The 4th district encompasses Milwaukee County, taking in the city of Milwaukee and its working-class suburbs of West Milwaukee and most of West Allis, the middle to upper-class suburb of Wauwatosa, and the North Shore communities of Glendale, Shorewood, Whitefish Bay, Fox Point, Bayside, and Brown Deer. The incumbent was Democrat Gwen Moore, who was reelected with 75.3% of the vote in 2022.

=== Democratic primary ===
==== Candidates ====
===== Nominee =====
- Gwen Moore, incumbent U.S. representative

=== Endorsements ===
Gwen Moore

Organizations

- Fair Wisconsin
- Feminist Majority PAC
- Humane Society Legislative Fund
- J Street PAC
- League of Conservation Voters
- Planned Parenthood Action Fund
- Population Connection Action Fund
- Sierra Club

Labor unions

- United Auto Workers

==== Fundraising ====
Campaign finance reports as of July 24, 2024
| Candidate | Raised | Spent | Cash on hand |
|---|---|---|---|
| Gwen Moore (D) | $995,811 | $987,149 | $31,012 |
Source: Federal Election Commission

==== Results ====
Democratic primary results
| Party | Candidate | Votes | % |
|---|---|---|---|
| Democratic | Gwen Moore (incumbent) | 85,017 | 99.5 |
| Write-in | | 411 | 0.5 |
| Total votes | | 85,428 | 100.0 |

=== Republican primary ===
==== Candidates ====
===== Nominee =====
- Tim Rogers, delivery driver and perennial candidate

===== Eliminated in primary =====
- Purnima Nath, engineer

==== Results ====
Republican primary results
| Party | Candidate | Votes | % |
|---|---|---|---|
| Republican | Tim Rogers | 13,382 | 71.2 |
| Republican | Purnima Nath | 5,348 | 28.4 |
| Write-in | | 327 | 0.4 |
| Total votes | | 19,057 | 100.0 |

=== General election ===
==== Predictions ====
| Source | Ranking | As of |
|---|---|---|
| The Cook Political Report | Solid D | September 6, 2024 |
| Inside Elections | Solid D | June 20, 2024 |
| Sabato's Crystal Ball | Safe D | July 31, 2024 |
| Elections Daily | Safe D | August 26, 2024 |
| CNalysis | Solid D | August 18, 2024 |
| Decision Desk HQ | Safe D | October 22, 2024 |

==== Results ====
2024 Wisconsin's 4th congressional district election
| Party | Candidate | Votes | % |
|---|---|---|---|
| Democratic | Gwen Moore (incumbent) | 249,938 | 74.8 |
| Republican | Tim Rogers | 74,921 | 22.4 |
| Independent | Robert Raymond | 8,792 | 2.6 |
| Write-in | | 631 | 0.2 |
| Total votes | | 334,282 | 100.0 |
| Democratic hold | | | |

== District 5 ==
2024 Wisconsin's 5th congressional district election
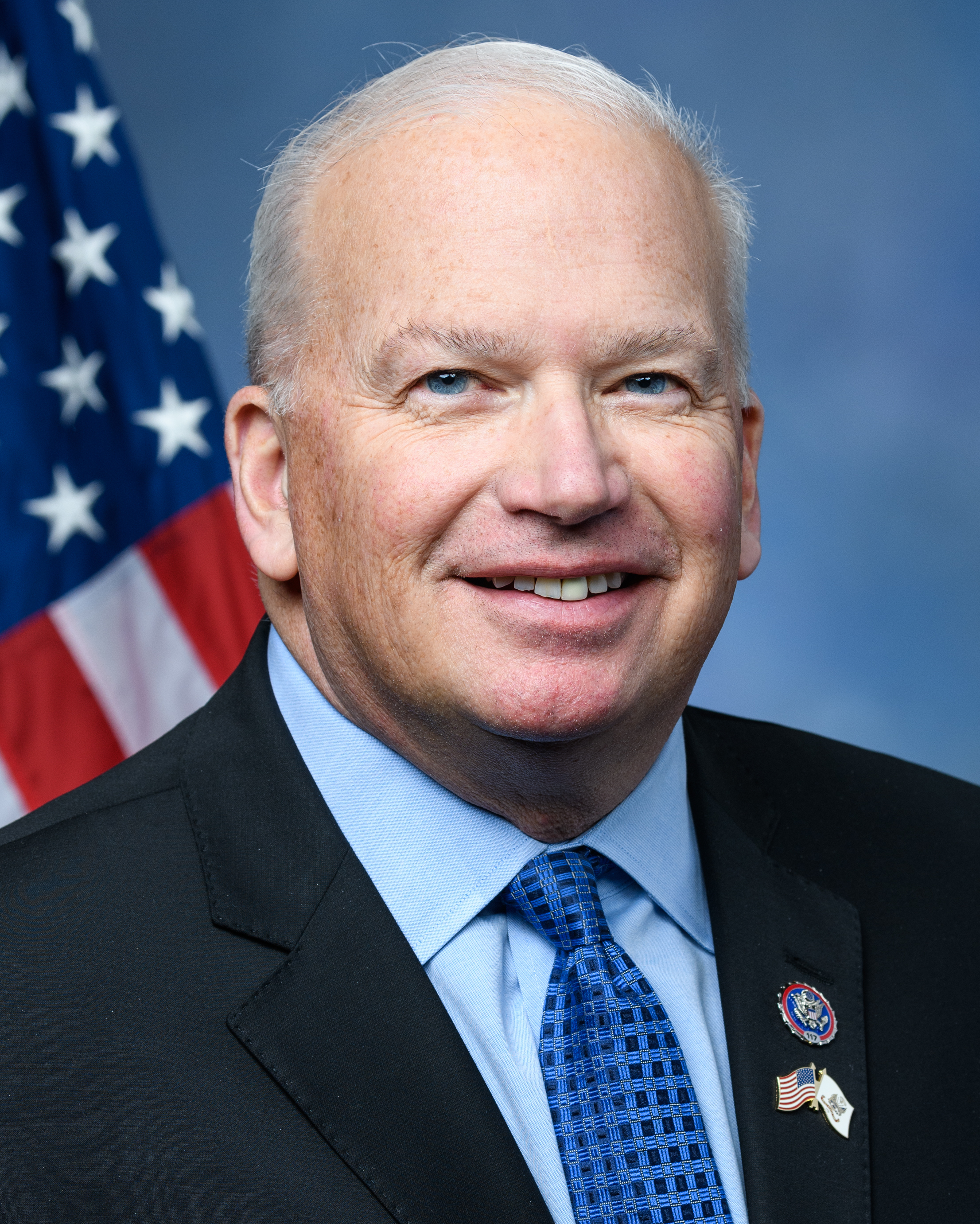

| Nominee | Scott Fitzgerald | Ben Steinhoff |
| Party | Republican | Democratic |
| Popular vote | 300,521 | 165,653 |
| Percentage | 64.4% | 35.5% |
- Fitzgerald: 50–60% 60–70% 70–80% 80–90% >90% Steinhoff: 40–50% 50–60% 60–70% 80–90%
U.S. Representative before election
Scott Fitzgerald
Republican
Elected U.S. Representative
Scott Fitzgerald
Republican

The 5th district takes in the northern and western suburbs of Milwaukee, including Washington County, Jefferson County, as well as most of Waukesha County. The incumbent was Republican Scott Fitzgerald, who was reelected with 64.4% of the vote in 2022.

=== Republican primary ===
==== Candidates ====
===== Nominee =====
- Scott Fitzgerald, incumbent U.S. representative

==== Endorsements ====
Scott Fitzgerald

Organizations

- AIPAC

==== Fundraising ====
Campaign finance reports as of March 31, 2024
| Candidate | Raised | Spent | Cash on hand |
|---|---|---|---|
| Scott Fitzgerald (R) | $754,995 | $383,669 | $764,156 |
Source: Federal Election Commission

==== Results ====
Republican primary results
| Party | Candidate | Votes | % |
|---|---|---|---|
| Republican | Scott Fitzgerald (incumbent) | 100,916 | 99.3 |
| Write-in | | 734 | 0.7 |
| Total votes | | 101,650 | 100.0 |

=== Democratic primary ===
==== Candidates ====
===== Nominee =====
- Ben Steinhoff, paramedic

==== Results ====
Democratic primary results
| Party | Candidate | Votes | % |
|---|---|---|---|
| Democratic | Ben Steinhoff | 57,039 | 99.8 |
| Write-in | | 94 | 0.2 |
| Total votes | | 57,133 | 100.0 |

=== General election ===
==== Predictions ====
| Source | Ranking | As of |
|---|---|---|
| The Cook Political Report | Solid R | September 6, 2024 |
| Inside Elections | Solid R | June 20, 2024 |
| Sabato's Crystal Ball | Safe R | July 31, 2024 |
| Elections Daily | Safe R | August 26, 2024 |
| CNalysis | Solid R | August 18, 2024 |
| Decision Desk HQ | Safe R | October 22, 2024 |

==== Results ====
2024 Wisconsin's 5th congressional district election
| Party | Candidate | Votes | % |
|---|---|---|---|
| Republican | Scott Fitzgerald (incumbent) | 300,521 | 64.4 |
| Democratic | Ben Steinhoff | 165,653 | 35.5 |
| Write-in | | 508 | 0.1 |
| Total votes | | 466,682 | 100.0 |
| Republican hold | | | |

== District 6 ==
2024 Wisconsin's 6th congressional district election
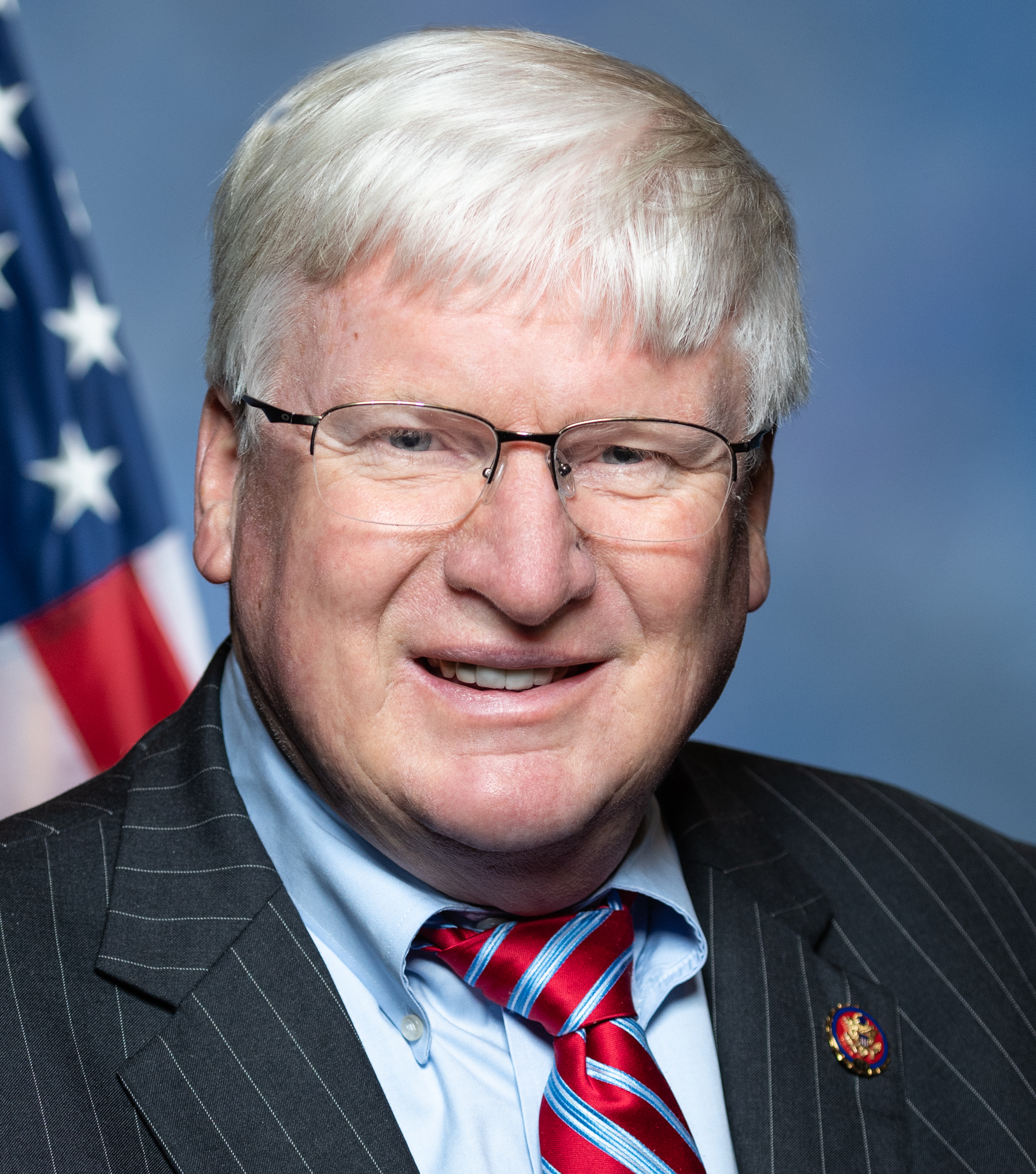

| Nominee | Glenn Grothman | John Zarbano |
| Party | Republican | Democratic |
| Popular vote | 251,889 | 159,042 |
| Percentage | 61.2% | 38.7% |
- Grothman: 50–60% 60–70% 70–80% 80–90% Zarbano: 50–60% 60–70% Tie: 50%
U.S. Representative before election
Glenn Grothman
Republican
Elected U.S. Representative
Glenn Grothman
Republican

The 6th district is based in east-central Wisconsin, encompassing part of the Fox River Valley, and takes in Fond du Lac, Oshkosh, and Sheboygan. The incumbent was Republican Glenn Grothman, who was reelected in 2022 with only write-in opposition.

=== Republican primary ===
==== Candidates ====
===== Nominee =====
- Glenn Grothman, incumbent U.S. representative

==== Endorsements ====
Glenn Grothman

Organizations

- AIPAC

==== Fundraising ====
Campaign finance reports as of March 31, 2024
| Candidate | Raised | Spent | Cash on hand |
|---|---|---|---|
| Glenn Grothman (R) | $558,776 | $574,666 | $521,836 |
Source: Federal Election Commission

==== Results ====
Republican primary results
| Party | Candidate | Votes | % |
|---|---|---|---|
| Republican | Glenn Grothman (incumbent) | 75,113 | 99.2 |
| Write-in | | 580 | 0.8 |
| Total votes | | 75,693 | 100.0 |

=== Democratic primary ===
==== Candidates ====
===== Nominee =====
- John Zarbano, college professor

==== Endorsements ====
John Zarbano

Labor unions

- United Auto Workers

==== Fundraising ====
Campaign finance reports as of March 31, 2024
| Candidate | Raised | Spent | Cash on hand |
|---|---|---|---|
| Amy Washburn (D) | $3,975 | $11,131 | $0 |
| John Zarbano (D) | $17,735 | $11,512 | $6,222 |
Source: Federal Election Commission

==== Results ====
Democratic primary results
| Party | Candidate | Votes | % |
|---|---|---|---|
| Democratic | John Zarbano | 54,212 | 99.9 |
| Write-in | | 65 | 0.1 |
| Total votes | | 54,277 | 100.0 |

=== General election ===
==== Predictions ====
| Source | Ranking | As of |
|---|---|---|
| The Cook Political Report | Solid R | September 6, 2024 |
| Inside Elections | Solid R | June 20, 2024 |
| Sabato's Crystal Ball | Safe R | July 31, 2024 |
| Elections Daily | Safe R | August 26, 2024 |
| CNalysis | Solid R | August 18, 2024 |
| Decision Desk HQ | Safe R | October 7, 2024 |

==== Fundraising ====
Campaign finance reports as of October 16, 2024
| Candidate | Raised | Spent | Cash on hand |
|---|---|---|---|
| Glenn Grothman (R) | $931,269 | $863,113 | $605,883 |
| John Zarbano (D) | $42,359 | $47,945 | $19,454 |
Source: Federal Election Commission

==== Results ====
2024 Wisconsin's 6th congressional district election
| Party | Candidate | Votes | % |
|---|---|---|---|
| Republican | Glenn Grothman (incumbent) | 251,889 | 61.2 |
| Democratic | John Zarbano | 159,042 | 38.7 |
| Write-in | | 418 | 0.1 |
| Total votes | | 411,349 | 100.0 |
| Republican hold | | | |

== District 7 ==
2024 Wisconsin's 7th congressional district election
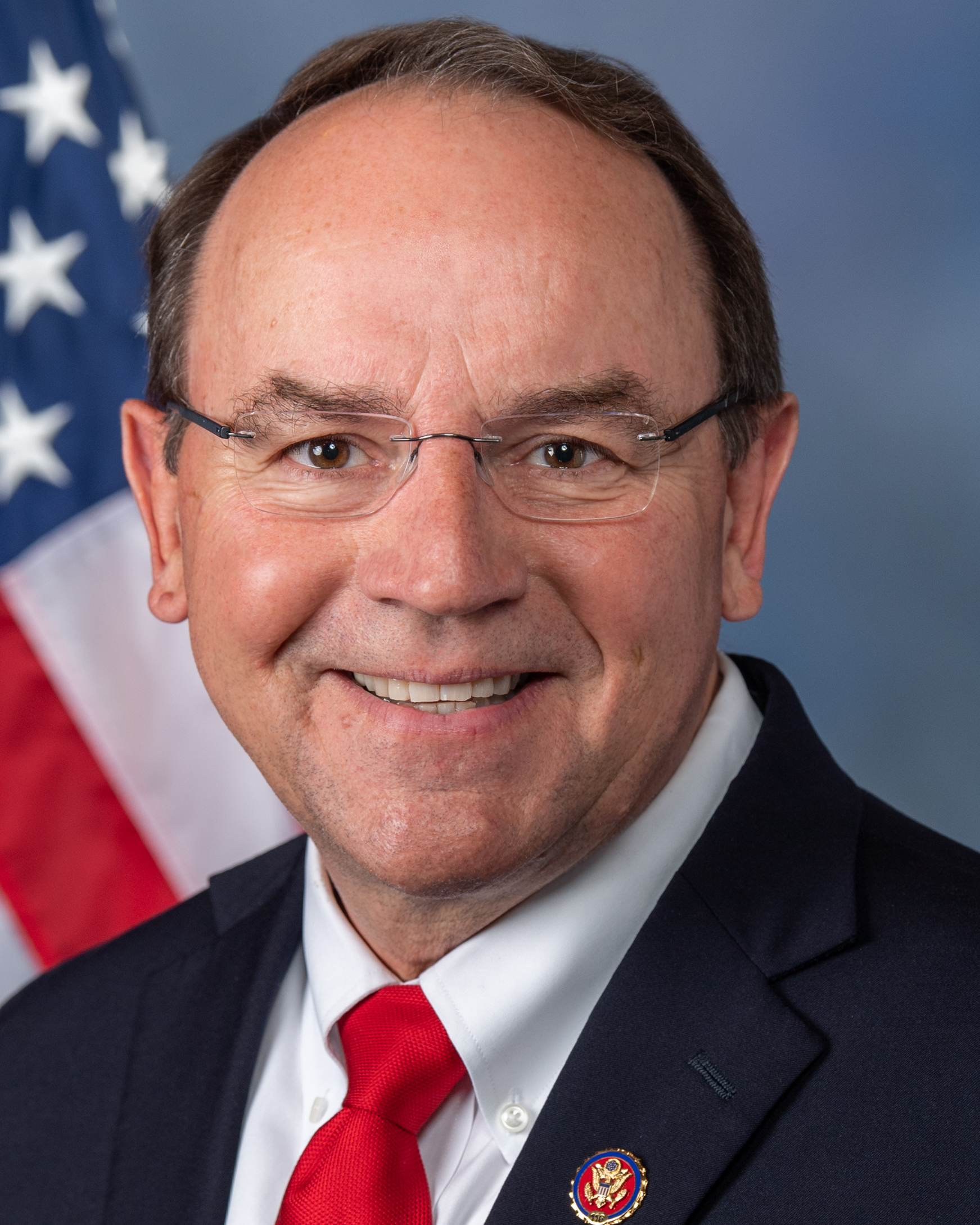

| Nominee | Tom Tiffany | Kyle Kilbourn |
| Party | Republican | Democratic |
| Popular vote | 273,553 | 156,524 |
| Percentage | 63.6% | 36.4% |
- Tiffany: 50–60% 60–70% 70–80% 80–90% >90% Kilbourn: 50–60% 60–70% 70–80% 80–90% >90% Tie: 50% No votes
U.S. Representative before election
Tom Tiffany
Republican
Elected U.S. Representative
Tom Tiffany
Republican

The 7th district is located in northwestern Wisconsin and includes Wausau and Superior. The incumbent was Republican Tom Tiffany, who was reelected with 61.9% of the vote in 2022.

=== Republican primary ===
==== Candidates ====
===== Nominee =====
- Tom Tiffany, incumbent U.S. representative

==== Endorsements ====
Tom Tiffany

Organizations

- AIPAC
- Wisconsin College Republicans

==== Fundraising ====
Campaign finance reports as of March 31, 2024
| Candidate | Raised | Spent | Cash on hand |
|---|---|---|---|
| Tom Tiffany (R) | $975,353 | $578,872 | $736,151 |
Source: Federal Election Commission

==== Results ====
Republican primary results
| Party | Candidate | Votes | % |
|---|---|---|---|
| Republican | Tom Tiffany (incumbent) | 78,503 | 99.4 |
| Write-in | | 449 | 0.6 |
| Total votes | | 78,952 | 100.0 |

=== Democratic primary ===
==== Nominee ====
- Kyle Kilbourn, design specialist

===== Eliminated in primary =====
- Elsa Duranceau, grant coordinator

==== Endorsements ====
Kyle Kilbourn

Organizations

- Freethought Equality Fund
- Vote Common Good

==== Fundraising ====
Campaign finance reports as of July 24, 2024
| Candidate | Raised | Spent | Cash on hand |
|---|---|---|---|
| Elsa Duranceau (D) | $10,147 | $9,447 | $173 |
| Kyle Kilbourn (D) | $125,360 | $100,921 | $24,438 |
Source: Federal Election Commission

==== Results ====
Primary results by county: Kilbourn: 50–60%; 60–70%; Duranceau: 50–60%

Democratic primary results
| Party | Candidate | Votes | % |
|---|---|---|---|
| Democratic | Kyle Kilbourn | 32,917 | 58.0 |
| Democratic | Elsa Duranceau | 23,795 | 41.9 |
| Write-in | | 63 | 0.1 |
| Total votes | | 56,775 | 100.0 |

=== General election ===
==== Predictions ====
| Source | Ranking | As of |
|---|---|---|
| The Cook Political Report | Solid R | September 6, 2024 |
| Inside Elections | Solid R | June 20, 2024 |
| Sabato's Crystal Ball | Safe R | July 31, 2024 |
| Elections Daily | Safe R | August 26, 2024 |
| CNalysis | Solid R | August 18, 2024 |
| Decision Desk HQ | Safe R | October 22, 2024 |

==== Fundraising ====
Campaign finance reports as of October 16, 2024
| Candidate | Raised | Spent | Cash on hand |
|---|---|---|---|
| Tom Tiffany (R) | $1,196,053 | $1,331,760 | $210,111 |
| Kyle Kilbourn (D) | $214,631 | $179,619 | $35,011 |
Source: Federal Election Commission

==== Results ====
2024 Wisconsin's 7th congressional district election
| Party | Candidate | Votes | % |
|---|---|---|---|
| Republican | Tom Tiffany (incumbent) | 273,553 | 63.6 |
| Democratic | Kyle Kilbourn | 156,524 | 36.4 |
| Write-in | | 307 | 0.1 |
| Total votes | | 430,384 | 100.0 |
| Republican hold | | | |

== District 8 ==
2024 Wisconsin's 8th congressional district elections
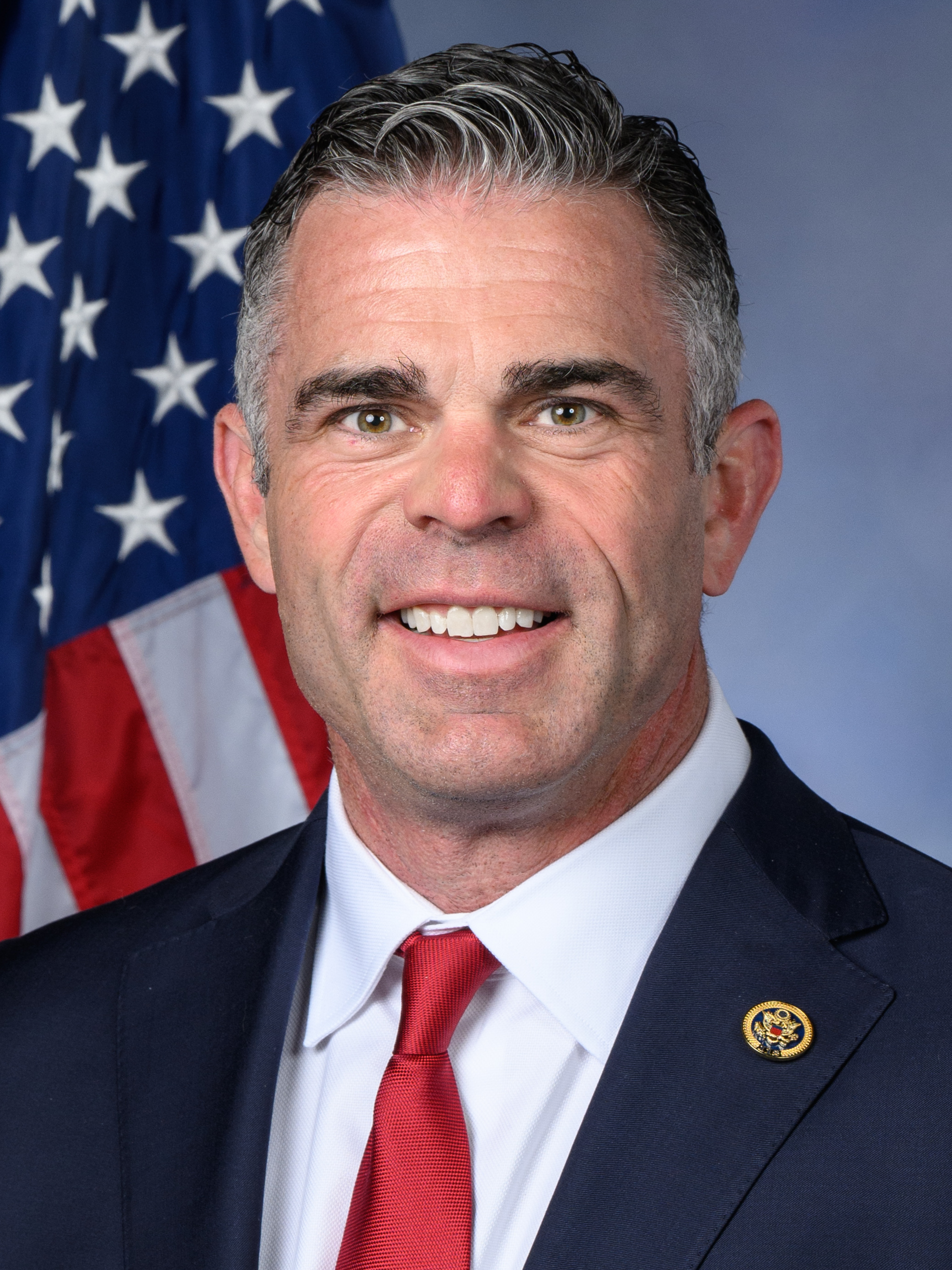

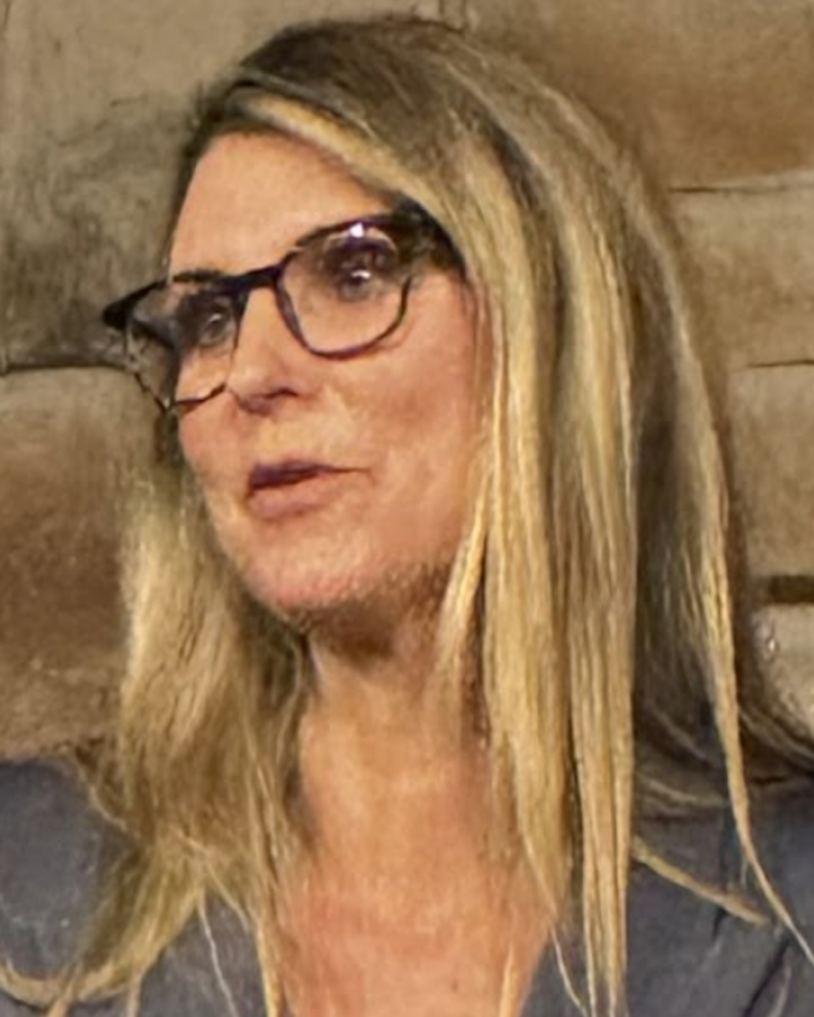
| Nominee | Tony Wied | Kristin Lyerly |
| Party | Republican | Democratic |
| Regular election | 240,040; 57.3% | 178,666; 42.7% |
| Special election | 242,003; 57.4% | 179,926; 42.6% |
- Wied: 50–60% 60–70% 70–80% 80–90% >90% Lyerly: 50–60% 60–70% 70–80% 80–90% >90% Tie: 40–50%
U.S. Representative before election
Tony Wied
Republican
Elected U.S. Representative
Tony Wied
Republican

The 8th district encompasses northeastern Wisconsin, including Green Bay and Appleton. The seat is vacant, though the prior officeholder was Republican Mike Gallagher, who was reelected with 72.2% of the vote in 2022. On February 10, 2024, Gallagher announced he would not run for a fifth term in Congress. A month later, he announced that he would resign effective April 19, 2024, though he later moved the date to April 20 to vote in favor of aid to Ukraine, Israel and Taiwan. With the resignation going into effect after the second Tuesday in April, the vacancy was filled with a special election held concurrently with the regular election.

=== Republican primary ===
==== Candidates ====
===== Nominee =====
- Tony Wied, former gas station chain owner

===== Eliminated in primary =====
- André Jacque, state senator from the 1st district (2019–present)
- Roger Roth, former president of the Wisconsin Senate (2017–2021) from the 19th district (2015–2023), nephew of former U.S. representative Toby Roth, candidate for this district in 2010, and nominee for lieutenant governor in 2022

===== Withdrawn =====
- Mike Gallagher, former U.S. representative

===== Declined =====
- Alex Bruesewitz, political consultant (endorsed Wied)
- John Macco, state representative from the 88th district (2015–2025)

==== Endorsements ====
André Jacque

U.S. senators

- Ted Cruz, U.S. senator from Texas (2015–present)

U.S. representatives

- Glenn Grothman, U.S. representative from W-06 (2015–present)

State legislators

- Elijah Behnke, state representative from the 89th district (2021–present)
- Ty Bodden, state representative from the 59th district (2023–present)
- Rachael Cabral-Guevara, state senator for the 19th district (2023–present)
- Alan Lasee, state senator for the 1st district (1977–2011)
- Ron Tusler, state representative from the 3rd district (2017–present)

County officials

- Cheryl Berken, Brown County register of deeds
- Adam Bieber, former Shawano County sheriff
- Brett Bowe, Calumet County sheriff
- John Gossage, former Brown County sheriff
- Christian Gossett, Winnebago County district attorney
- Matt Joski, Kewaunee County sheriff
- Natalie Strohymeyer, Winnebago County register of deeds

Individuals

- Abby Johnson, anti-abortion advocate

Labor unions

- Wisconsin Professional Police Organization
Roger Roth

Executive branch officials

- Mike Pompeo, former United States secretary of state (2018–2021)

U.S. representatives

- Scott Fitzgerald, U.S. representative from WI-05 (2021–present)

Statewide officials

- Scott Walker, former governor of Wisconsin (2011–2019)

County officials

- Brad Gehring, former Outagamie County sheriff
- Clint Kriewaldt, Outagamie County Sheriff

Organizations

- With Honor Fund
Tony Wied

Executive branch officials

- Donald Trump, 45th president of the United States (2017–2021)

U.S. representatives

- Byron Donalds, U.S. representative from Florida's 19th congressional district (2021–present)
- Kevin Hern, U.S. representative from Oklahoma's 1st congressional district (2019–present)

Individuals

- Alex Bruesewitz, political consultant

Organizations

- Wisconsin College Republicans
Alex Bruesewitz (declined to run)

Individuals

- Roger Stone, conservative political consultant and lobbyist

Organizations

- ~~Republicans for National Renewal~~ (switched endorsement to Wied after Bruesewitz declined)
- Wisconsin College Republicans

==== Fundraising ====
Campaign finance reports as of July 24, 2024
| Candidate | Raised | Spent | Cash on hand |
|---|---|---|---|
| André Jacque (R) | $243,689 | $153,295 | $90,394 |
| Roger Roth (R) | $727,550 | $315,591 | $411,958 |
| Tony Wied (R) | $859,072 | $630,638 | $228,424 |
Source: Federal Election Commission

==== Polling ====
Hypothetical polling

| Poll source | Date(s) administered | Sample size | Margin of error | Alex Bruesewitz | André Jacque | Roger Roth | Undecided |
|---|---|---|---|---|---|---|---|
| Cygnal (R) | March 26–27, 2024 | 300 (LV) | ± 5.6% | 36% | 15% | 12% | 37% |

==== Results ====
Primary results by county: Wied: 30–40%; 40–50%; 50–60%; Roth: 30–40%; 40–50%; Jacque: 40–50%

Republican primary results
| Party | Candidate | Votes | % |
|---|---|---|---|
| Republican | Tony Wied | 41,937 | 42.1 |
| Republican | Roger Roth | 34,344 | 34.5 |
| Republican | André Jacque | 23,186 | 23.3 |
| Write-in | | 65 | 0.1 |
| Total votes | | 99,532 | 100.0 |

=== Democratic primary ===
==== Candidates ====
===== Nominee =====
- Kristin Lyerly, OB/GYN

==== Endorsements ====
Kristin Lyerly

Statewide officials

- Tony Evers, governor of Wisconsin (2019–present)
- Gretchen Whitmer, governor of Michigan (2019–present)

Organizations

- Reproductive Freedom for All

==== Results ====
Democratic primary results
| Party | Candidate | Votes | % |
|---|---|---|---|
| Democratic | Kristin Lyerly | 56,469 | 100.0 |
| Write-in | | 25 | 0.0 |
| Total votes | | 56,494 | 100.0 |

=== General election ===
==== Predictions ====
| Source | Ranking | As of |
|---|---|---|
| The Cook Political Report | Solid R | September 6, 2024 |
| Inside Elections | Solid R | June 20, 2024 |
| Sabato's Crystal Ball | Safe R | July 31, 2024 |
| Elections Daily | Safe R | August 26, 2024 |
| CNalysis | Solid R | August 18, 2024 |
| Decision Desk HQ | Safe R | October 7, 2024 |

==== Results ====
2024 Wisconsin's 8th congressional district election
| Party | Candidate | Votes | % |
|---|---|---|---|
| Republican | Tony Wied | 240,040 | 57.3 |
| Democratic | Kristin Lyerly | 178,666 | 42.6 |
| Write-in | | 272 | 0.1 |
| Total votes | | 418,978 | 100.0 |
| Republican hold | | | |

==== By county ====
| County | Tony Wied Republican | | Kristin Lyerly Democratic | | Total votes |
| County | % | # | % | # | Total votes |
|---|---|---|---|---|---|
| Brown | 53.1% | 76,656 | 46.9% | 67,646 | 144,302 |
| Calumet | 58.8% | 16,632 | 41.2% | 11,675 | 28,307 |
| Door | 48.5 | 9,970 | 51.5% | 10,579 | 20,549 |
| Kewaunee | 64.0% | 7,833 | 36.0% | 4,405 | 12,238 |
| Marinette | 67.6% | 16,065 | 32.4% | 7,700 | 23,765 |
| Menominee | 20.7% | 302 | 79.3% | 1,160 | 1,462 |
| Oconto | 70.0% | 17,056 | 30.0% | 7,327 | 24,383 |
| Outagamie | 54.6% | 59,789 | 45.4% | 49,794 | 109,583 |
| Shawano | 66.7% | 15,242 | 33.3% | 7,597 | 22,839 |
| Waupaca | 65.4% | 19,205 | 34.6% | 10,175 | 29,380 |
| Winnebago | 68.0% | 1,290 | 32.0% | 608 | 1,898 |

=== Special election ===
2024 Wisconsin's 8th congressional district special election
| Party | Candidate | Votes | % | ±% |
|---|---|---|---|---|
| Republican | Tony Wied | 241,930 | 57.36% | −14.85 |
| Democratic | Kristin Lyerly | 179,862 | 42.64% | N/A |
| Total votes | | 421,792 | 100.0% | |
| Republican hold | | | | |

By county

| County | Tony Wied Republican | | Kristin Lyerly Democratic | | Write-in | | Margin | | Total votes |
| County | # | % | # | % | # | % | # | % | Total votes |
|---|---|---|---|---|---|---|---|---|---|
| Brown | 77,298 | 53.09 | 68,289 | 46.91 | | | 9,009 | 6.19 | 145,587 |
| Calumet (part) | 16,704 | 58.72 | 11,744 | 41.28 | | | 4,960 | 17.44 | 28,448 |
| Door | 10,049 | 48.55 | 10,650 | 51.45 | | | -601 | -2.90 | 20,699 |
| Kewaunee | 7,902 | 64.14 | 4,417 | 35.86 | | | 3,485 | 28.29 | 12,319 |
| Marinette | 16,176 | 67.60 | 7,754 | 32.40 | | | 8,422 | 35.20 | 23,930 |
| Menominee | 303 | 20.20 | 1,197 | 79.80 | | | -894 | -59.60 | 1,500 |
| Oconto | 17,161 | 69.90 | 7,391 | 30.10 | | | 9,770 | 39.80 | 24,552 |
| Outagamie | 60,116 | 54.65 | 49,885 | 45.35 | | | 10,231 | 9.30 | 110,001 |
| Shawano | 15,416 | 66.80 | 7,663 | 33.20 | | | 7,753 | 33.60 | 23,079 |
| Waupaca | 19,513 | 65.55 | 10,256 | 34.45 | | | 9,257 | 31.10 | 29,769 |
| Winnebago (part) | 1,292 | 67.71 | 616 | 32.29 | | | 676 | 35.43 | 1,908 |
| Total | 241,930 | 57.36 | 179,862 | 42.64 | | | 62,068 | 14.72 | 421,792 |

== Notes ==
Partisan clients
