= Tony Wied =

American politician (born 1976)

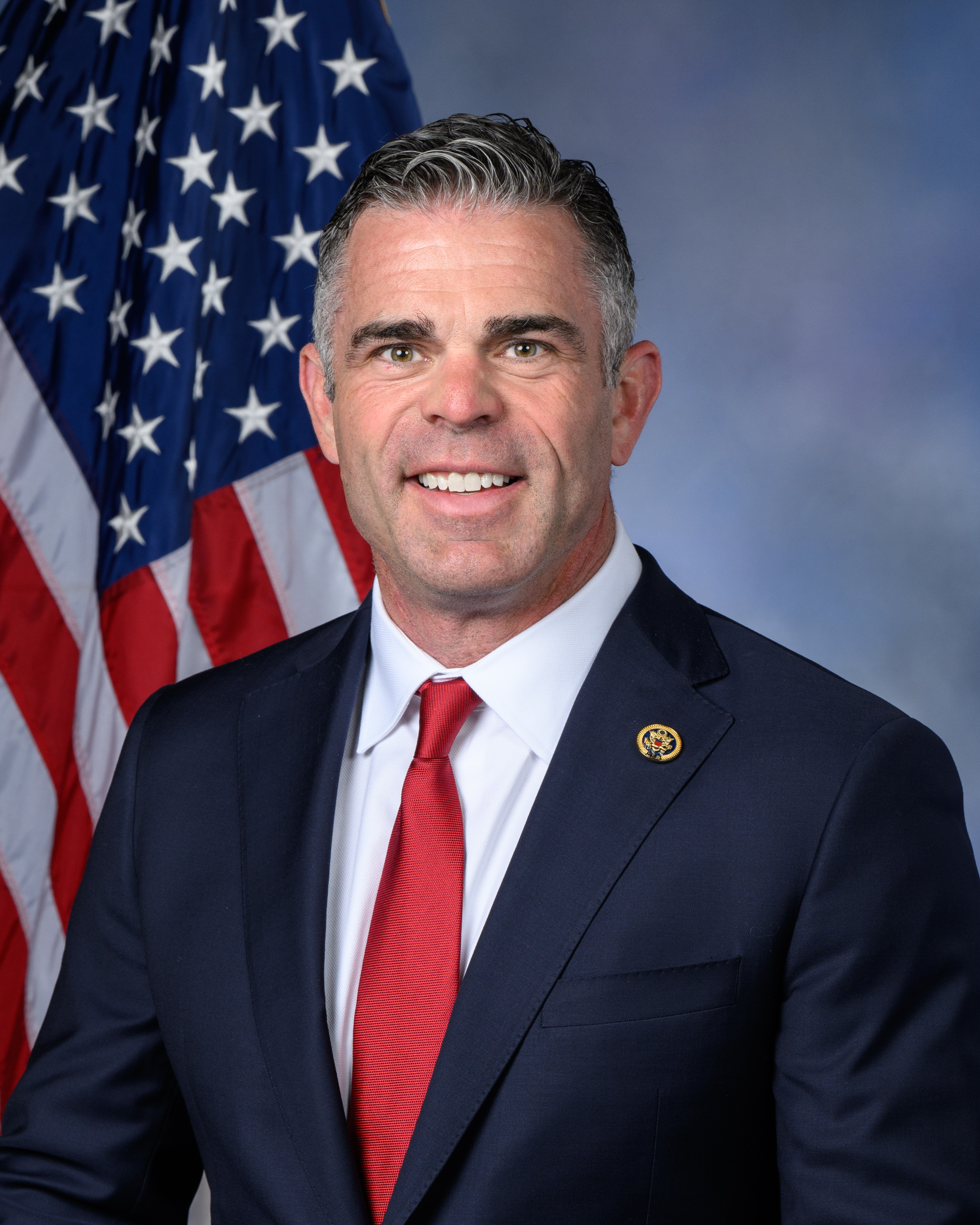
- Official portrait, 2024

Member of the U.S. House of Representatives from Wisconsin's 8th district
- Incumbent
- Assumed office November 5, 2024 (Note: Wied's official service begins on the date of the special election, while he was not sworn in until November 12, 2024.)
- Preceded by: Mike Gallagher

Personal details
- Born: Anthony Christian Wied; May 3, 1976 (age 50) Lincoln, Nebraska, U.S.
- Party: Republican
- Spouse: Angela Wied
- Children: 4
- Education: St. Norbert College (BBA)
- Website: House website Campaign website

Anthony Christian Wied (born May 3, 1976) is an American politician from the Republican Party who is serving as the U.S. representative for Wisconsin's 8th congressional district since November 2024.

Wied was first elected to Congress in a 2024 special election to succeed Mike Gallagher.

== Early life and career ==
Wied was raised in Ashwaubenon, Wisconsin. He attended Notre Dame Academy, graduating in 1994. He then attended St. Norbert College, where he played college football and graduated in 1998. Wied inherited a chain of gas and convenience stores called Dino Stop, which he sold in 2022.

== U.S. House of Representatives ==
=== Elections ===
==== 2024 special and 2024 general ====
After Mike Gallagher announced his resignation from the United States House of Representatives, serving for Wisconsin's 8th congressional district, in 2024, Wied announced his candidacy in the special election to succeed him. Wied received an endorsement from Donald Trump and Alex Bruesewitz, a Trump ally who had previously considered running to succeed Gallagher before Wied entered the race. Wied defeated state senators André Jacque and Roger Roth in the Republican Party primary election on August 13. He won the special and general elections against the Democratic Party nominee, Kristin Lyerly, and was sworn in on November 12.

=== Tenure ===
Wied supported the American Relief Act of 2025.

=== Caucus memberships ===
- Republican Study Committee
- Republican Main Street Partnership
- Congressional Western Caucus

== Personal life ==
Wied and his wife, Angela, have four sons. They live in De Pere, Wisconsin.

== Electoral history ==
=== U.S. House (2024) ===
Year	Election	Date	Elected				Defeated				Total	Plurality
2024 (special)	Primary	Aug. 13	Tony Wied	Republican	42,610	42.48%	Roger Roth	Rep.	31,874	32.53%	97,993	10,736
2024 (special)	Primary	Aug. 13	Tony Wied	Republican	42,610	42.48%	André Jacque	Rep.	23,509	23.99%	97,993	10,736
2024 (special)	Special	Nov. 5	Tony Wied	Republican	242,003	57.15%	Kristin Lyerly	Dem.	181,196	42.80%	423,431	60,807
2024	Primary	Aug. 13	Tony Wied (inc)	Republican	41,937	42.13%	Roger Roth	Rep.	34,344	34.51%	99,532	7,593
2024	Primary	Aug. 13	Tony Wied (inc)	Republican	41,937	42.13%	André Jacque	Rep.	23,186	23.30%	99,532	7,593
2024	General	Nov. 5	Tony Wied (inc)	Republican	240,040	57.30%	Kristin Lyerly	Dem.	178,666	42.64%	418,978	61,593

U.S. House of Representatives
Preceded by Mike Gallagher	Member of the U.S. House of Representatives from Wisconsin's 8th congressional district 2024–present	Incumbent
U.S. order of precedence (ceremonial)
Preceded by LaMonica McIver	United States representatives by seniority 362nd	Succeeded by Gil Cisneros
