= Samuel Plummer =

Samuel Plummer may refer to:

- Samuel L. Plummer (1828–1897), member of the Wisconsin State Assembly
- Samuel F. Plummer (1853–?), member of the Wisconsin State Assembly
