= John Morgan (Wisconsin politician) =

American politician

John J. Morgan M.D.

Member of the Wisconsin State Assembly from the Buffalo–Pepin district
- In office January 4, 1915 – January 1, 1917
- Preceded by: James Allison
- Succeeded by: Frank Schaettle

Mayor of Durand, Wisconsin
- In office April 1902 – April 1904
- Succeeded by: Frank Pierce

District Attorney of Pepin County, Wisconsin
- In office January 1, 1887 – January 1, 1889
- Preceded by: John Frazer
- Succeeded by: William E. Plummer

Clerk of Pepin County, Wisconsin
- In office January 1, 1895 – January 1, 1899
- Preceded by: A. J. Wallace
- Succeeded by: Charles K. Averill
- In office January 1, 1881 – January 1, 1885
- Preceded by: Miletus Knight
- Succeeded by: William E. Plummer

Personal details
- Born: June 12, 1846 Wethersfield, New York, U.S.
- Died: February 10, 1926 (aged 79) Durand, Wisconsin, U.S.
- Cause of death: Stroke
- Resting place: Forest Hill Cemetery, Durand, Wisconsin
- Party: Republican
- Spouse: Jane Timewell Humphrey (m. 1887–1926)
- Children: 2
- Education: University at Buffalo School of Medicine and Biomedical Sciences; Albany Law School
- Profession: Physician, Lawyer

John J. Morgan (June 12, 1846 – February 10, 1926) was an American physician, lawyer, and Republican politician from Pepin County, Wisconsin. He was a member of the Wisconsin State Assembly, representing Pepin and Buffalo counties during the 1915 session. He was also mayor of Durand, Wisconsin, for two years, and served eight years as county clerk and two years as district attorney.

== Biography ==
John J. Morgan was born on June 12, 1846, in Wethersfield, New York. He graduated from what is now the University at Buffalo School of Medicine and Biomedical Sciences in 1873 and from Albany Law School in 1884. On October 27, 1887, Morgan married Jane Humphrey, with whom he had two children.

== Career ==
Morgan was elected to the Assembly in 1914. Previously, he had been elected County Clerk of Pepin County, Wisconsin in 1880 and held the position for four years. He was also District Attorney of Pepin County from 1886 to 1888 and Mayor of Durand, Wisconsin from 1902 to 1905. Morgan was a Republican.

== Death and burial ==
Morgan died in Durand on February 10, 1926. He was buried at Forest Hill Cemetery in Durand.

Wisconsin State Assembly
Preceded by James Allison	Member of the Wisconsin State Assembly from the Buffalo–Pepin district January 4, 1915 – January 1, 1917	Succeeded by Frank Schaettle
Political offices
Preceded by Miletus Knight	Clerk of Pepin County, Wisconsin; January 1, 1881 – January 1, 1885	Succeeded by William E. Plummer
Preceded by A. J. Wallace	Clerk of Pepin County, Wisconsin; January 1, 1895 – January 1, 1899	Succeeded by Charles K. Averill
Legal offices
Preceded by John Frazer	District Attorney of Pepin County, Wisconsin; January 1, 1887 – January 1, 1889	Succeeded by William E. Plummer
