= Convenanter Church =

Convenanter Church is a misspelling of Covenanter Church, a nickname often applied to and used by the Reformed Presbyterian Church in the past. In the United States, "Convenanter Church" also refers to two buildings once used by this denomination, which are listed by this misspelling on the National Register of Historic Places:

- Stafford Reformed Presbyterian Church, listed as "Convenanter Church" in Stafford, Kansas
- Reformed Presbyterian Church of Vernon, listed with the alternate name of "Convenanter Church" in Waukesha County, Wisconsin
