= Dutee =

Dutee is a male given name of Irish origin. People with the name include:

- Dutee Arnold (1763–1849), Justice of the Rhode Island Supreme Court
- Dutee Wilcox Flint (1882–1961), Rhode Island state senator and business magnate
- Dutee Jerauld Pearce (1789–1849), United States Representative from Rhode Island
- Dutee A. Whelan (1879–1939), Wisconsin farmer, businessman, and politician

== See also ==
- Dutee Chand (born 1996), Indian female professional sprinter
