= WQOQ =

WQOQ may refer to:

- WQOR (FM), a radio station (90.5 FM) licensed to serve Laceyville, Pennsylvania, United States, which held the call sign WQOQ in 2023; see List of radio stations in Pennsylvania
- WRDN, a radio station (1430 AM) licensed to serve Durand, Wisconsin, United States, which held the call sign WQOQ from 2003 to 2011
