= Finseth =

Finseth is a surname. Notable people with the surname include:

- Leonard Finseth (1911–1991), Norwegian-American fiddler
- Tim Finseth (born 1964), American politician
