= Arkansaw, Wisconsin =

Census-designated place in Wisconsin, United States

Arkansaw
- Census-designated place
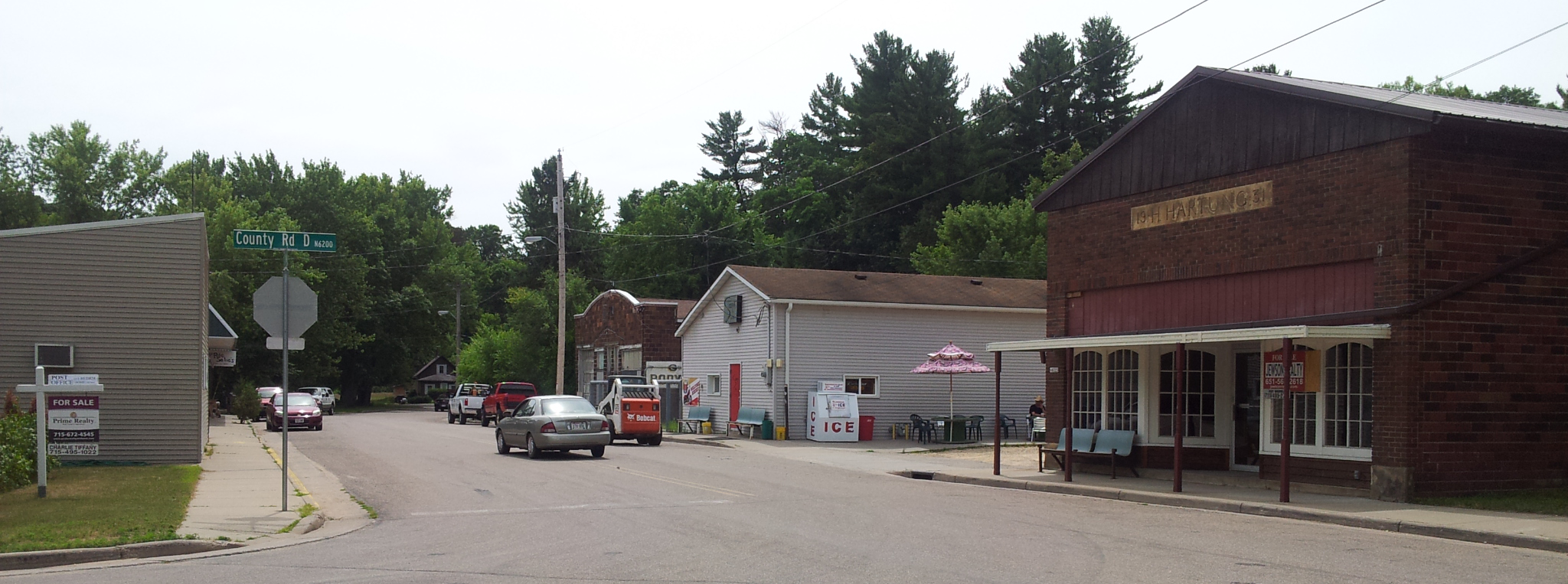
- Downtown Arkansaw, Wisconsin

- Location within the state of Wisconsin
- Coordinates: 44°38′00″N 92°1′20″W
- Country: United States
- State: Wisconsin
- County: Pepin

Area
  - Total: 0.72 sq mi (1.86 km^{2})
  - Land: 0.71 sq mi (1.84 km^{2})
  - Water: 0.0077 sq mi (0.02 km^{2})
- Elevation: 738 ft (225 m)

Population (2020)
  - Total: 194
  - Density: 273/sq mi (105/km^{2})
- Time zone: UTC-6 (Central (CST))
  - Summer (DST): UTC-5 (CDT)
- FIPS code: 55-02700
- GNIS feature ID: 1560934

Arkansaw (/ˈɑːrkənsɔː/ AR-kən-saw) is an unincorporated census-designated place in the eastern portion of the town of Waterville, in Pepin County, Wisconsin, United States. Located approximately 3 miles (4.8 km) west of Durand, it has the ZIP code of 54721. As of the 2020 census, its population was 194. From 1881 to 1886, the community was the county seat of Pepin County.

== History ==
Arkansaw was founded in the early 1850s at a crossing of Arkansaw Creek, a tributary of the Eau Galle River. Initially built around lumbering, the first sawmill was opened in the community in 1852.

The community was originally built near the center of three dams within a mile of each other on Arkansaw Creek. All three were wiped out in a flood in 1907. Arkansaw Creek was named in honor of the Arkansas River. Today, the course of the creek runs through Arkansaw Creek Park.

== Geography ==
The community lies at the junction of U.S. Route 10 and Pepin County Trunk Highways D, N, O, and X. It has an area of 0.720 square miles (1.86 km^{2}); 0.712 square miles (1.84 km^{2}) of this is land, and 0.008 square miles (0.021 km^{2}) is water.

== Demographics ==
Historical population
Census	Pop.	Note	%±
2010	177		—
2020	194		9.6%
U.S. Decennial Census

== Religion ==
The community is home to three churches: Catholic, Methodist and Community of Christ.

== Notable people ==
- Lucius Roy Holbrook - U.S. Army Major General
- Willard Ames Holbrook - U.S. Army Major General
- Mary Laschinger - businesswoman
- Samuel L. Plummer - Wisconsin State Representative
