= Laschinger =

Laschinger is a surname. Notable people with the surname include:

- John Laschinger, Canadian political organizer
- Mary Laschinger (born 1959), American business executive, chairman and CEO of Veritiv Corporation
