= William Huntington =

William Huntington may refer to:

- William Huntington (preacher) (1745–1813), preacher and coalheaver in London
- William Edwards Huntington (1844–1930), American academic
- William H. Huntington (1848–?), American politician
- William Reed Huntington (1838–1909), American priest and writer
- William Huntington (Mormon) (1784–1846), early Mormon leader
- William Henry Huntington (1820–1885), American journalist
- William R. Huntington (1907–1990), American architect
