= Veritiv =

Packaging company in the US

- Company type: Privately held company
- Industry: Pulp and paper industry, Packaging, and Facility Supplies
- Founded: 2007; 19 years ago (as Xpedx); July 1, 2014; 11 years ago (as Vertitiv)
- Headquarters: Atlanta, Georgia
- Key people: Salvatore A. Abbate, CEO; J. Scott Palfreeman, CFO
- Owner: Clayton, Dubilier & Rice (2023–present)
- Subsidiaries: Unisource Worldwide
- Website: www.veritiv.com

Veritiv, a subsidiary of Clayton, Dubilier & Rice, is a business-to-business provider of packaging, publishing, and hygiene products. Headquartered in Sandy Springs, Georgia, part of the Atlanta metropolitan area, it has 125 operating distribution centers throughout the United States and Mexico.

The company is ranked 503rd on the Fortune 500. While Mary Laschinger was the CEO, it was the largest woman-run company in Georgia.

== History ==
Veritiv was established on July 1, 2014 upon the merger of the xpedx division of International Paper Company with the parent company of Unisource Worldwide.

In August 2014, the firm leased its headquarters in Sandy Springs, Georgia, from Cousins Properties.

In September 2017, it acquired All American Containers, its first acquisition. It was sold in December 2024.

In 2020, during the COVID-19 pandemic, the company cut its workforce by 15%. In September, CEO Mary Laschinger retired and was replaced by Salvatore A. Abbate.

In May 2022, the company sold its Canadian operations.

In November 2023, the company was acquired by Clayton, Dubilier & Rice.

In December 2024, the company acquired Orora Packaging Solutions.

== See also ==
- List of Georgia companies
