= Guthrie, Wisconsin =

- Unincorporated community
- Location within Wisconsin Location within the United States
- Coordinates: 42°55′30″N 88°12′00″W
- Country: United States
- State: Wisconsin
- County: Waukesha
- Elevation: 935 ft (285 m)
- Time zone: UTC-6 (Central (CST))
  - Summer (DST): UTC-5 (CDT)
- Area code: 262
- GNIS feature ID: 1577190

Guthrie is a former unincorporated community located in the village of Vernon, Waukesha County, Wisconsin, United States. The community was named for its first postmaster, Charles R. Guthrie, who opened the post office in January 1896.
