= Samuel L. Plummer =

American politician

Samuel Lane Plummer (March 5, 1828 – March 21, 1897) was a member of the Wisconsin State Assembly in 1874.

== Biography ==
Plummer was born on March 5, 1828. He later married Eunice Belknap. They had nine children, including Samuel F. Plummer and William Edmunds Plummer, who were also members of the Assembly.

He first settled in Beloit, Wisconsin in 1849 after having walked some 600 miles before arriving there. After living for a time in Green County, Wisconsin, Plummer moved to Durand, Wisconsin in 1855 and to Waterville, Wisconsin in 1861 before stopping in Arkansaw, Wisconsin.

Plummer died after a surgical procedure on March 21, 1897. He was a Baptist.

== Career ==
Plummer served three terms in the Assembly. He was appointed Pepin County, Wisconsin Judge in 1861 and was elected as such in 1862, 1865, 1869, and 1873. Other positions he held include Chairman of the Waterville Town Board and of the Pepin County Board.
