= Delbert K. Smith =

American politician

Delbert K. Smith (November 15, 1862 – June 17, 1905) was an American farmer and state politician in Wisconsin.

Born in Big Bend, Waukesha County, Wisconsin, Smith went to the public schools and the Rochester Seminary.

After graduating from the University of Wisconsin, Smith became a farmer in the town of Vernon. Elected to the state legislature in 1894, Smith served in the Wisconsin State Assembly from 1895 to 1899. Smith then worked for the Wisconsin Secretary of State.

He returned to his farm. In 1904 and 1905, Smith served as chairman of the Vernon Town Board, equivalent to a mayor.

Smith died at his home, in Vernon, Wisconsin, from tuberculosis (then called consumption).
