= Vernon, Wisconsin =

- Village
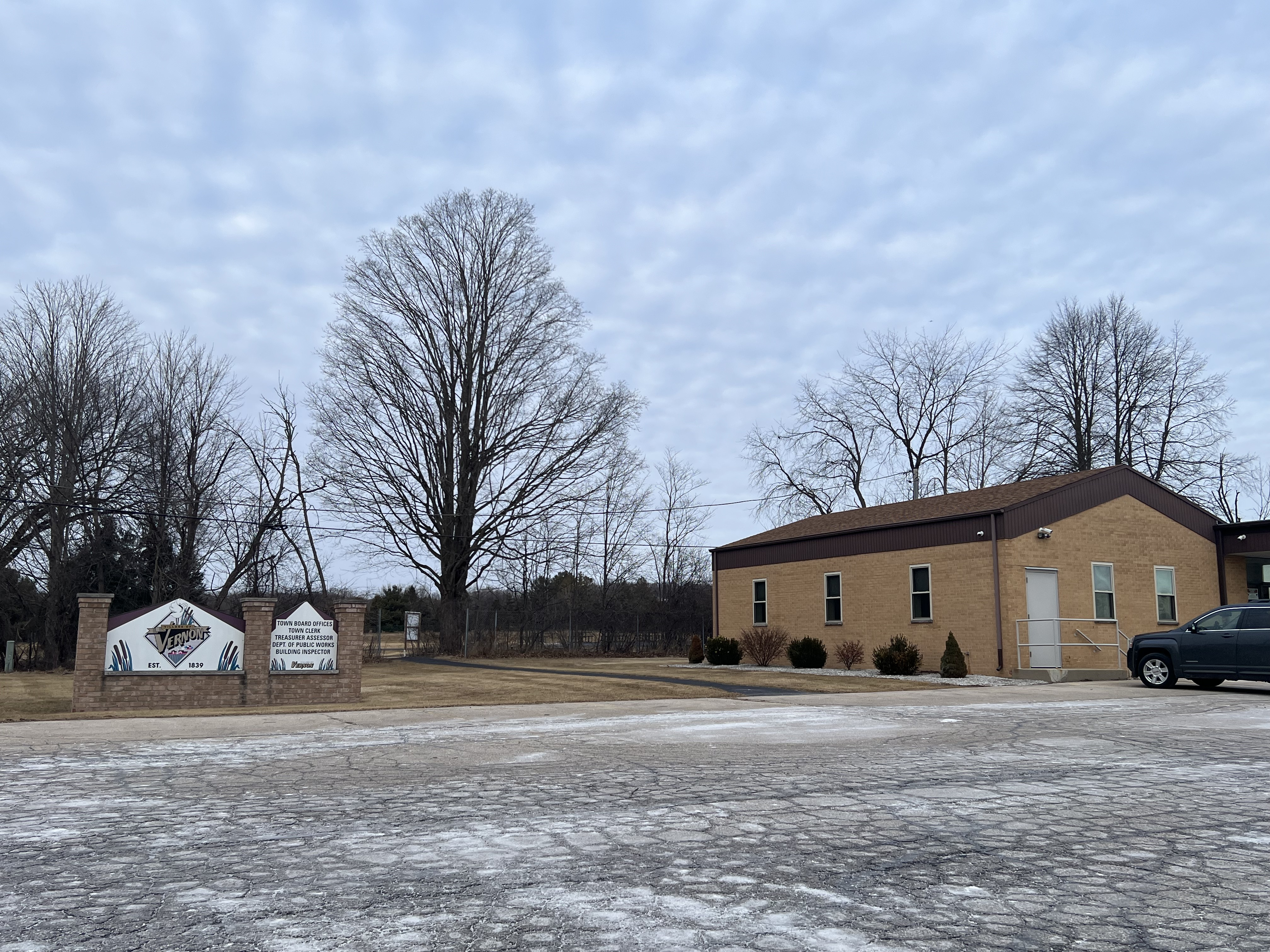
- Vernon Village Hall

- Location in Waukesha County and the state of Wisconsin.
- Coordinates: 42°53′29″N 88°14′44″W
- Country: United States
- State: Wisconsin
- County: Waukesha

Area
  - Total: 32.7 sq mi (84.7 km^{2})
  - Land: 32.2 sq mi (83.5 km^{2})
  - Water: 0.46 sq mi (1.2 km^{2})
- Elevation: 899 ft (274 m)

Population (2020)
  - Total: 7,474
  - Density: 224/sq mi (86.5/km^{2})
- Time zone: UTC-6 (Central (CST))
  - Summer (DST): UTC-5 (CDT)
- FIPS code: 55-82575
- GNIS feature ID: 1584327

Vernon is a village in Waukesha County, Wisconsin, United States. The population was 7,474 at the 2020 census.

== Former communities ==
- Dodges Corners was an unincorporated community and is now a ghost town at the intersection of County Road L (former section of WIS 24) and Maple Avenue
- Guthrie was a community in the village and is now a neighborhood west of Guthrie Road. The community was named for Charles R. Guthrie, who opened the post office in January 1896.
- Vernon was an unincorporated community that now serves as the center of the village. It is currently mainly west of Center Drive along County Road ES/National Avenue (former WIS 15).

== History ==
Originally Vernon was part of Muskego. March 8, 1839 the State Legislature incorporated the Town of Vernon. On June 4, 2020, the former Town of Vernon incorporated as a village to keep compliant with State Statutes.

== Geography ==
According to the United States Census Bureau, the village has an area of 32.7 square miles (84.7 km^{2}), of which 32.2 square miles (83.5 km^{2}) is land and 0.5 square miles (1.2 km^{2}) is water.

== Demographics ==
Historical population
Census	Pop.	Note	%±
1980	6,372		—
1990	7,549		18.5%
2000	7,227		−4.3%
2010	7,601		5.2%
2020	7,474		−1.7%

As of the census of 2000, there were 7,227 people, 2,380 households, and 2,122 families resided in the town. The population density was 224.1 people per square mile (86.5/km^{2}). There were 2,405 housing units at an average density of 74.6 per square mile (28.8/km^{2}). The racial makeup of the town was 98.39% White, 0.46% African American, 0.21% Native American, 0.25% Asian, 0.06% Pacific Islander, 0.08% from other races, and 0.55% from two or more races. Hispanic or Latino of any race were 1.02% of the population.

There were 2,380 households, out of which 41.4% had children under the age of 18 living with them, 82.9% were married couples living together, 3.9% had a female householder with no husband present, and 10.8% were non-families. 7.7% of all households were made up of individuals, and 2.1% had someone living alone who was 65 years of age or older. The average household size was 3.00 and the average family size was 3.18.

In the town, the population was spread out, with 28.1% under the age of 18, 7.0% from 18 to 24, 26.6% from 25 to 44, 32.7% from 45 to 64, and 5.7% who were 65 years of age or older. The median age was 39 years. For every 100 females, there were 108.3 males. For every 100 females age 18 and over, there were 104.2 males.

The median income for a household in the town was $71,366, and the median income for a family was $73,850. Males had a median income of $50,363 versus $32,103 for females. The per capita income for the town was $26,019. About 0.8% of families and 1.4% of the population were below the poverty line, including 0.2% of those under age 18 and 8.5% of those age 65 or over.

== Historic sites ==
The Reformed Presbyterian Church of Vernon is in the village. Listed on the National Register of Historic Places, it is a Greek Revival structure built in the 1850s.

== Notable people ==
- William Allison, Wisconsin state representative, lived in Vernon.
- Dave Craig, Wisconsin state representative, resides in Vernon.
- Glenn Robert Davis, U.S. representative, was born in Vernon.
- James A. McKenzie, Wisconsin state representative, was born in Vernon.
- John M. Oddie, Wisconsin state representative, lived in Vernon.
- Nick Pearson, Olympic speed skater, lived in Vernon while attending Mukwonago High School.
- Delbert K. Smith, Wisconsin state representative, was born in Vernon.
- Tyler Styer, professional pool player, was born in Vernon.
