= George Tarrant Sr. =

American businessman and politician

George Tarrant, Sr. (February 11, 1838 – July 29, 1905) was an American businessman and politician.

Born in Woolhampton, Berkshire, England, Tarrant emigrated with his parents to the United States, in 1850, and settled in Janesville, Wisconsin. In 1863, Tarrant moved to Durand, Pepin County, Wisconsin, and was in the jewelry business. Tarrant served as president of the Pepin County Agricultural Society. He served on the Pepin County Board of Supervisors and was chairman of the county board. He also served as the town treasurer. In 1881, Tarrant served in the Wisconsin State Assembly and was a Republican. Tarrant served as the first mayor of Durand. Tarrant died from a heart ailment at his home in Durand, Wisconsin.
