= William Edmunds Plummer =

American politician

William Edmunds Plummer (April 10, 1861 – July 10, 1918) was a member of the Wisconsin State Assembly.

== Biography ==
Plummer was born on April 10, 1861. After attending Valparaiso University, he graduated from the University of Wisconsin Law School in 1889. On June 24, 1890, Plummer married Rose Oesterreicher. They had five children. Plummer died on July 10, 1918.

His father, Samuel L. Plummer, and brother, Samuel F. Plummer, were also members of the Assembly.

== Career ==
Plummer was elected to the Assembly in 1890. Other positions he held include District Attorney and County Judge of Pepin County, Wisconsin. He was a Republican.
