= Mondovi, Wisconsin =

- City
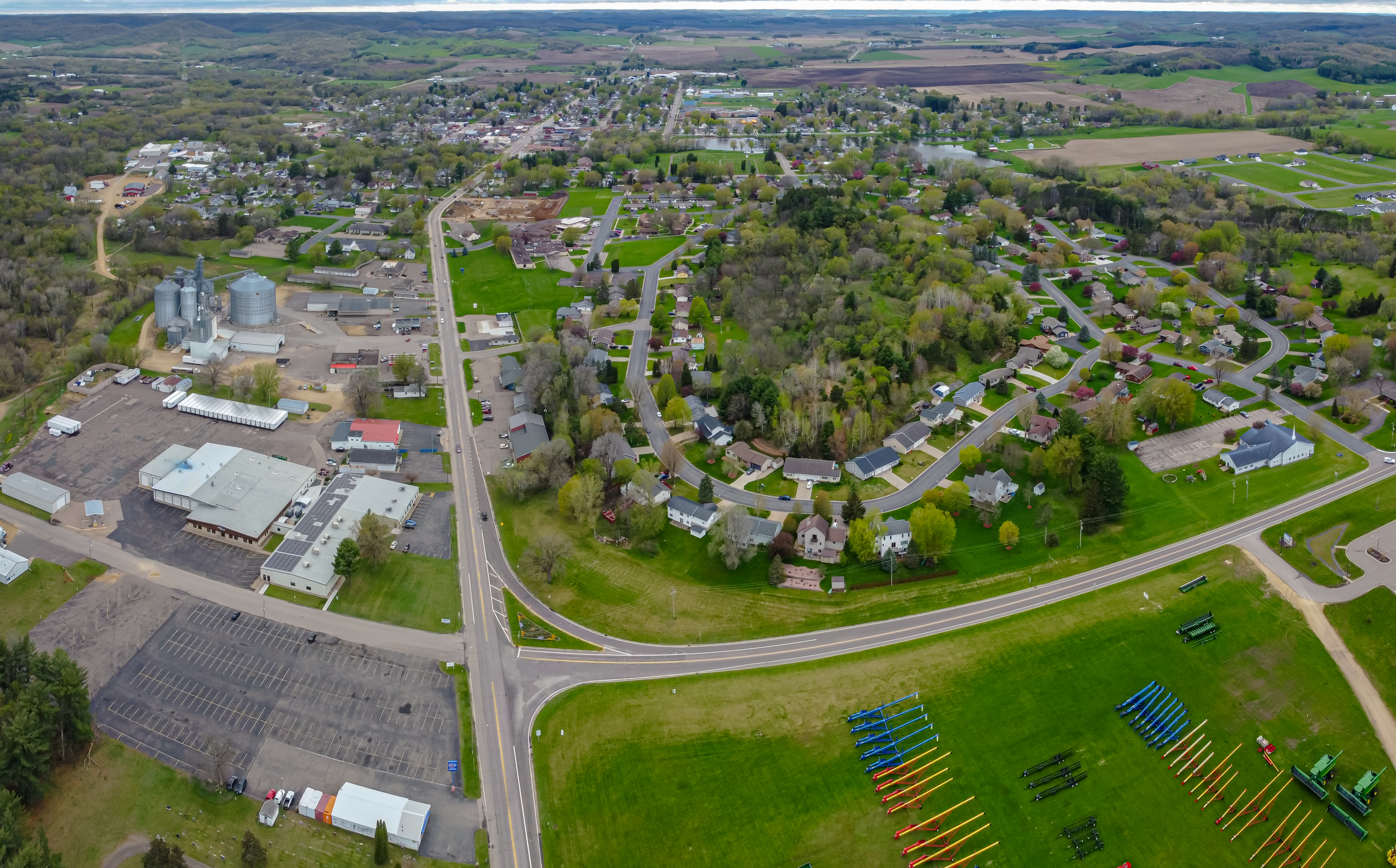
- US-10 runs through town

- Location of Mondovi in Buffalo County, Wisconsin.

- Location within Wisconsin Location within the United States
- Coordinates: 44°34′8″N 91°40′11″W
- Country: United States
- State: Wisconsin
- County: Buffalo

Area
  - Total: 3.98 sq mi (10.31 km^{2})
  - Land: 3.90 sq mi (10.09 km^{2})
  - Water: 0.085 sq mi (0.22 km^{2})
- Elevation: 804 ft (245 m)

Population (2020)
  - Total: 2,845
  - Density: 730.3/sq mi (282.0/km^{2})
- Time zone: UTC-6 (Central (CST))
  - Summer (DST): UTC-5 (CDT)
- Area codes: 715 & 534
- FIPS code: 55-53600
- GNIS feature ID: 1569650
- Website: mondoviwi.gov

Mondovi (/mɒnˈdoʊvi/ mon-DOH-vee) is a city along the Buffalo River in Buffalo County, Wisconsin, United States. The population was 2,845 at the 2020 census. The city is mostly surrounded by the Town of Mondovi, with a small portion surrounded by the Town of Naples.

== History ==
A post office called Mondovi has been in operation since 1854. Mondovi was laid out in 1855. The city was named in commemoration of the Battle of Mondovì.

== Geography ==
Mondovi is located at 44°34′7″N 91°40′10″W (44.568865, -91.669634).

According to the United States Census Bureau, the city has a total area of 3.91 square miles (10.13 km^{2}), of which 3.82 square miles (9.89 km^{2}) is land and 0.09 square miles (0.23 km^{2}) is water.

=== Climate ===
Climate data for Mondovi, Wisconsin, 1991–2020 normals, extremes 1908–present
Month	Jan	Feb	Mar	Apr	May	Jun	Jul	Aug	Sep	Oct	Nov	Dec	Year
Record high °F (°C)	56 (13)	64 (18)	84 (29)	92 (33)	108 (42)	102 (39)	110 (43)	104 (40)	101 (38)	96 (36)	79 (26)	65 (18)	110 (43)
Mean maximum °F (°C)	45.6 (7.6)	50.0 (10.0)	65.7 (18.7)	80.6 (27.0)	87.9 (31.1)	91.8 (33.2)	93.1 (33.9)	91.6 (33.1)	87.1 (30.6)	80.6 (27.0)	64.1 (17.8)	49.2 (9.6)	94.7 (34.8)
Mean daily maximum °F (°C)	27.0 (−2.8)	32.4 (0.2)	45.4 (7.4)	60.4 (15.8)	72.5 (22.5)	81.0 (27.2)	84.9 (29.4)	82.4 (28.0)	74.7 (23.7)	61.2 (16.2)	44.7 (7.1)	31.7 (−0.2)	58.2 (14.5)
Daily mean °F (°C)	17.1 (−8.3)	21.6 (−5.8)	34.0 (1.1)	47.3 (8.5)	59.3 (15.2)	68.7 (20.4)	72.5 (22.5)	70.2 (21.2)	62.4 (16.9)	49.5 (9.7)	35.3 (1.8)	22.9 (−5.1)	46.7 (8.2)
Mean daily minimum °F (°C)	7.2 (−13.8)	10.8 (−11.8)	22.6 (−5.2)	34.2 (1.2)	46.1 (7.8)	56.3 (13.5)	60.1 (15.6)	58.0 (14.4)	50.2 (10.1)	37.7 (3.2)	25.9 (−3.4)	14.2 (−9.9)	35.3 (1.8)
Mean minimum °F (°C)	−21.0 (−29.4)	−14.9 (−26.1)	−3.6 (−19.8)	16.4 (−8.7)	28.2 (−2.1)	39.9 (4.4)	47.1 (8.4)	44.2 (6.8)	31.6 (−0.2)	20.1 (−6.6)	6.4 (−14.2)	−12.1 (−24.5)	−23.5 (−30.8)
Record low °F (°C)	−45 (−43)	−43 (−42)	−34 (−37)	−5 (−21)	18 (−8)	29 (−2)	36 (2)	32 (0)	21 (−6)	8 (−13)	−13 (−25)	−38 (−39)	−45 (−43)
Average precipitation inches (mm)	1.09 (28)	1.13 (29)	2.05 (52)	3.39 (86)	4.29 (109)	5.25 (133)	4.12 (105)	4.89 (124)	3.85 (98)	2.45 (62)	1.98 (50)	1.39 (35)	35.88 (911)
Average snowfall inches (cm)	11.8 (30)	11.6 (29)	9.5 (24)	3.8 (9.7)	0.3 (0.76)	0.0 (0.0)	0.0 (0.0)	0.0 (0.0)	0.0 (0.0)	0.7 (1.8)	4.5 (11)	11.0 (28)	53.2 (134.26)
Average precipitation days (≥ 0.01 in)	9.4	8.2	9.5	12.0	13.1	12.7	10.6	10.4	9.8	9.5	8.3	9.9	123.4
Average snowy days (≥ 0.1 in)	9.2	7.8	5.0	2.3	0.1	0.0	0.0	0.0	0.0	0.4	3.7	8.8	37.3
Source 1: NOAA
Source 2: National Weather Service

== Demographics ==
Historical population
Census	Pop.	Note	%±
1880	295		—
1890	503		70.5%
1900	1,208		140.2%
1910	1,325		9.7%
1920	1,554		17.3%
1930	1,623		4.4%
1940	2,077		28.0%
1950	2,285		10.0%
1960	2,320		1.5%
1970	2,338		0.8%
1980	2,545		8.9%
1990	2,491		−2.1%
2000	2,634		5.7%
2010	2,777		5.4%
2020	2,845		2.4%
U.S. Decennial Census

=== 2010 census ===
As of the census of 2010, there were 2,777 people, 1,194 households, and 722 families living in the city. The population density was 727.0 inhabitants per square mile (280.7/km^{2}). There were 1,303 housing units at an average density of 341.1 per square mile (131.7/km^{2}). The racial makeup of the city was 96.7% White, 0.6% African American, 0.6% Native American, 0.5% Asian, 0.2% from other races, and 1.4% from two or more races. Hispanic or Latino people of any race were 1.4% of the population.

There were 1,194 households, of which 32.1% had children under the age of 18 living with them, 42.6% were married couples living together, 13.8% had a female householder with no husband present, 4.0% had a male householder with no wife present, and 39.5% were non-families. 33.7% of all households were made up of individuals, and 17.7% had someone living alone who was 65 years of age or older. The average household size was 2.26 and the average family size was 2.89.

The median age in the city was 39.9 years. 24.2% of residents were under the age of 18; 8.4% were between the ages of 18 and 24; 23.5% were from 25 to 44; 23.8% were from 45 to 64; and 20% were 65 years of age or older. The gender makeup of the city was 46.3% male and 53.7% female.

=== 2000 census ===
As of the census of 2000, there were 2,634 people, 1,122 households, and 657 families living in the city. The population density was 695.2 people per square mile (268.3/km^{2}). There were 1,232 housing units at an average density of 325.2 per square mile (125.5/km^{2}). The racial makeup of the city was 98.71% White, 0.19% Black or African American, 0.30% Native American, 0.27% Asian, and 0.53% from two or more races. 0.46% of the population were Hispanic or Latino of any race.

There were 1,122 households, out of which 27.0% had children under the age of 18 living with them, 45.5% were married couples living together, 9.5% had a female householder with no husband present, and 41.4% were non-families. 36.7% of all households were made up of individuals, and 21.5% had someone living alone who was 65 years of age or older. The average household size was 2.26 and the average family size was 2.96.

In the city, the population was spread out, with 23.5% under the age of 18, 8.0% from 18 to 24, 24.8% from 25 to 44, 20.2% from 45 to 64, and 23.4% who were 65 years of age or older. The median age was 40 years. For every 100 females, there were 85.5 males. For every 100 females age 18 and over, there were 80.5 males.

The median income for a household in the city was $31,000, and the median income for a family was $40,954. Males had a median income of $30,947 versus $21,434 for females. The per capita income for the city was $17,023. About 8.8% of families and 11.2% of the population were below the poverty line, including 14.4% of those under age 18 and 10.3% of those age 65 or over.

== Government ==
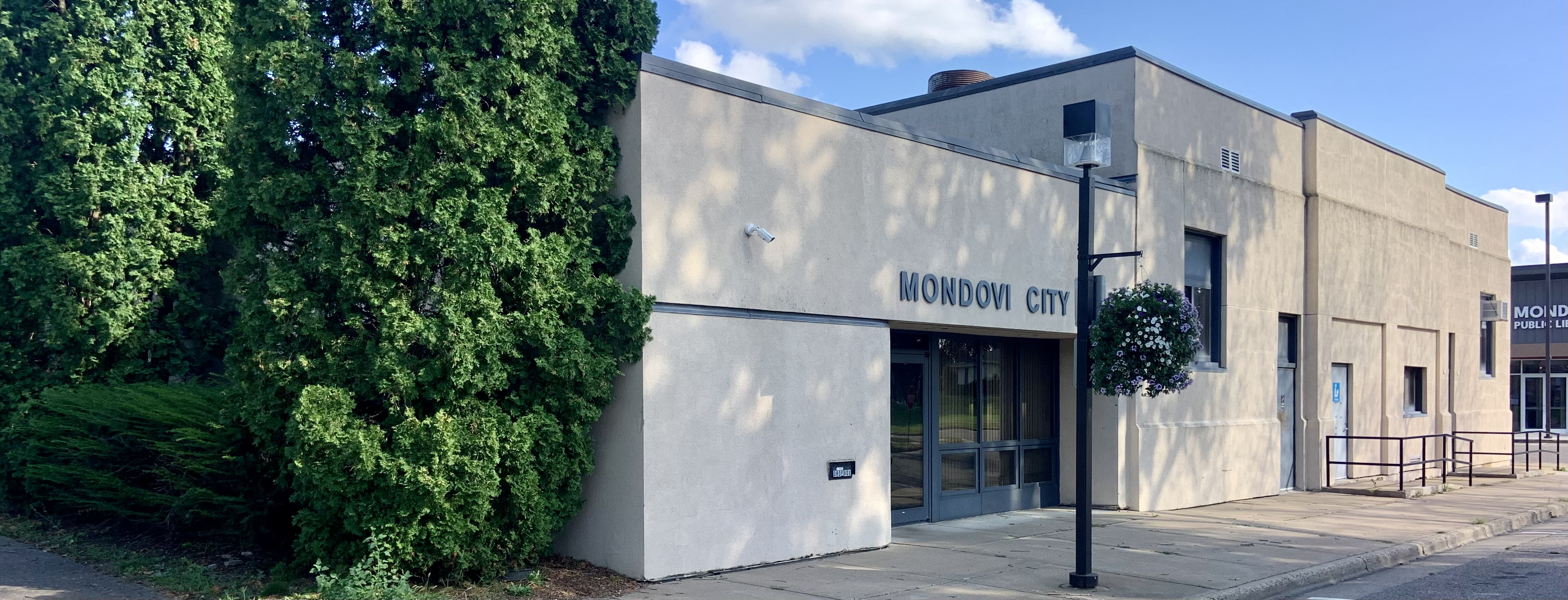
City Hall

=== Elected city officials ===
- Mayor, Brady L. Weiss
- City council members (7)
  - Ginny Gunderson - at-large
  - Lori Tvrdik Larson - Ward 1
  - Gary Stanton - Ward 1
  - Duey Bauer - Ward 2
  - David Schultz - Ward 2
  - Nathan Nelson- Ward 3
  - Greg Bauer - Ward 3

=== Appointed city officials ===
- City Administrator/Clerk Michelle Loken
- Police Chief David Shapiro
- Fire Chief Steve Anderson
- Director of Public Works Corey Dregney
- Street Superintendent James J. Rud
- Treasurer Dawn Moy
- Utility Clerk/Administrative Receptionist Jackie Dregney
- Administrative Assistant Sharon Nault

=== Police department ===
The Mondovi Police Department is a full-time department offering 24/7 police service to the City of Mondovi. The department consists of four full-time sworn officers, and four part-time sworn officers. The Mondovi Police Department has an officer dedicated as a working K9 handler. The officer works with K9 Buck, a pure bred German Shepherd, who is certified in narcotics detection and tracking. The department also owns an all-terrain vehicle, which it uses to patrol the city parks and the Buffalo River State Trail, which enters the city from the east.

=== Fire department ===
The Mondovi Fire Department consists of 30 volunteers.

=== Public works ===
The Public Works Department consists of six full-time employees.

=== Emergency medical service ===
The Mondovi Ambulance Service is a private service that operates in the City of Mondovi and surrounding areas. The staff consists of a number of volunteers. Mondovi EMS has two fully equipped ambulances.

==== City council meetings ====
- City council meetings are held the second and fourth Tuesdays of each month January through October.
- Meetings are held on the second Tuesday only in November and December.
- All regularly scheduled city council meetings begin at 5:30 p.m.
- Meeting notices and agendas are posted at Mondovi City Hall, Mondovi Post Office, Mondovi Police Department, Mondovi Public Library, Mondovi Herald-News Offices and are published in the Mondovi Herald-News weekly publication the Thursday before the meeting when possible.
- Any updates to posted agendas can be made until 1:00 p.m. the day before the meeting.
- The Finance Committee meets on the Monday before the second Tuesday of the month at 5:30 p.m.

== Education ==
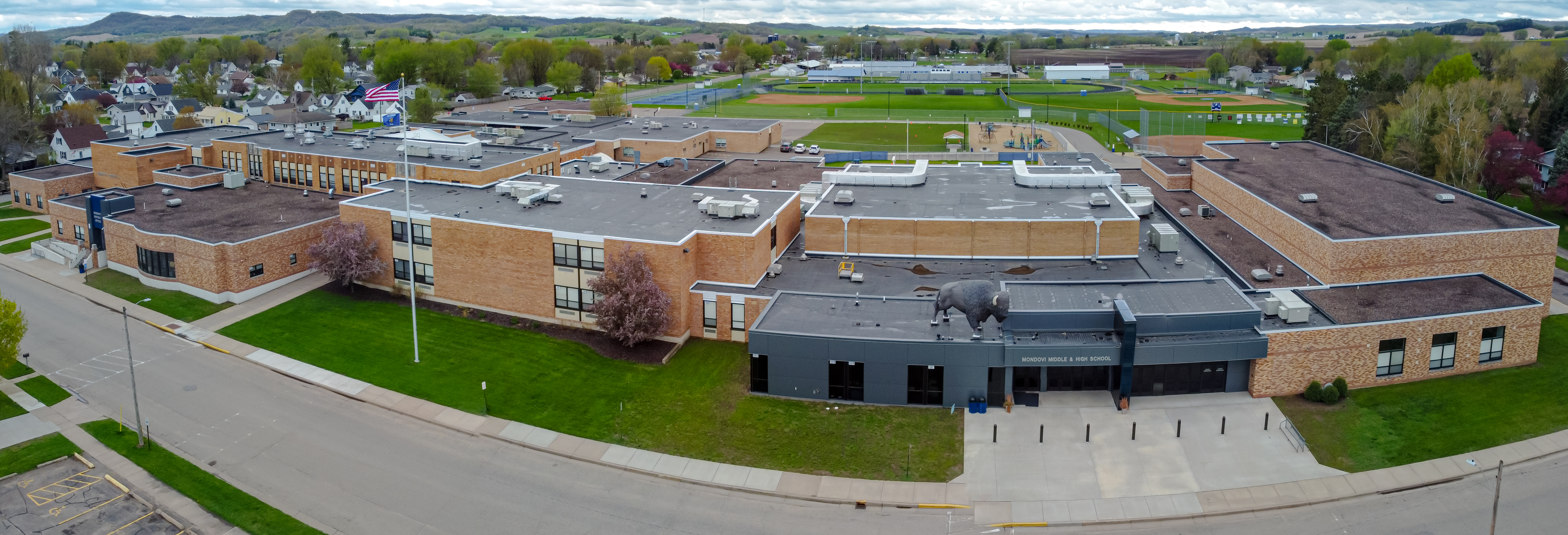
Mondovi High/Middle School

=== School District of Mondovi ===
The School District of Mondovi includes three schools. The elementary school includes children in pre-school through grade 5, the middle school encompasses students in grades 6 to 8, and the high school includes students in grades 9-12. During the 2013-2014 school year, total enrollment was 966. The student-to-teacher ratio in pre-kindergarten through grade 3 is no more than 18:1; the ratio in all other grades is less than 25:1. There are 78 certified staff, 3 administrators, and 46 full- or part-time support staff members.

District facilities include a complex in the city of Mondovi and another building, Anthony School, located about eight miles north of Mondovi on Highway 37. Students in Five-Year-Old Kindergarten through grade 12 attend the city school; students participating in the Early Childhood program or the Four-Year-Old Kindergarten program attend Anthony School. The city complex includes an outdoor swimming pool, a distance learning center, a fine arts performance area, weight room, three indoor athletic areas, and an outdoor physical education area which includes newly-renovated tennis courts and running track, a football field, baseball and softball fields, and additional practice fields.

== Parks and trails ==
=== Buffalo River State Trail ===
The Buffalo River State Trail passes through Mondovi offering a safe and scenic place for snowmobiling, horseback riding, ATV riding, hiking and biking. The 36.4 mile multi-use trail runs from Mondovi to Fairchild, Wisconsin and passes farms, woods, hills, marshland and the Buffalo River. Several other multi-purpose recreational trails are located near Mondovi including the Red Cedar State Trail, Chippewa River State Trail and Great River State Trail

=== Joseph Peterson Arboretum ===
Joseph Peterson Arboretum is a 10-acre natural area. Nearby public park area includes two volleyball courts, playground equipment and a picnic shelter.

Other Facilities:

- Community Center
- 4 baseball/softball fields
- Tennis courts nearby (at the school)
- Public outdoor swimming pool (at the school)

=== Mirror Lake Park ===
Mirror Lake Park has a scenic view of Mondovi's Mirror Lake, playground equipment, picnic areas, and shelters. A public boat landing is located at the park and an accessible fishing pier accommodates anglers and sightseers of all abilities.

=== Sharps Point Park ===
Sharps Point Park is the site of the Mondovi Veteran's Memorial and is located along the banks of Mirror Lake.

=== Tourist Park ===
Six campsites are available on a first-come, first-served basis. The campsites offer electrical hook-ups, water, and a sanitary dump that is available at the City's wastewater treatment plant on weekdays from 8am-3pm. Two shelters can be reserved for special events, one of which is a historic log cabin. Tourist Park also has a museum on site that is open to the public.

== Notable people ==
- Grover L. Broadfoot, chief justice of the Wisconsin Supreme Court and mayor of Mondovi
- Menzus R. Bump, Wisconsin State Representative
- Chauncey H. Cooke (1846–1919), American soldier in the U.S. Civil War
- Leonard Finseth, musician
- Dorothy Geeben, Florida politician
- Diane Hendricks, businesswoman
- Robert I. Johnson, Wisconsin State Representative
- Cayla Kluver, author
- Tim Krumrie, former Cincinnati Bengals noseguard, attended high school in Mondovi
- Ole H. Olson, governor of North Dakota
- Treig Pronschinske, mayor and Wisconsin State Representative
- Jacki Rickert, activist
- Frank Schaettle, Wisconsin State Representative
- Lester Schnare, U.S. diplomat
- Dutee A. Whelan, Wisconsin State Representative

== See also ==
- List of cities in Wisconsin
