= Mondovi (town), Wisconsin =

Town in Wisconsin, United States

Mondovi, Wisconsin
- Town
- Town of Mondovi
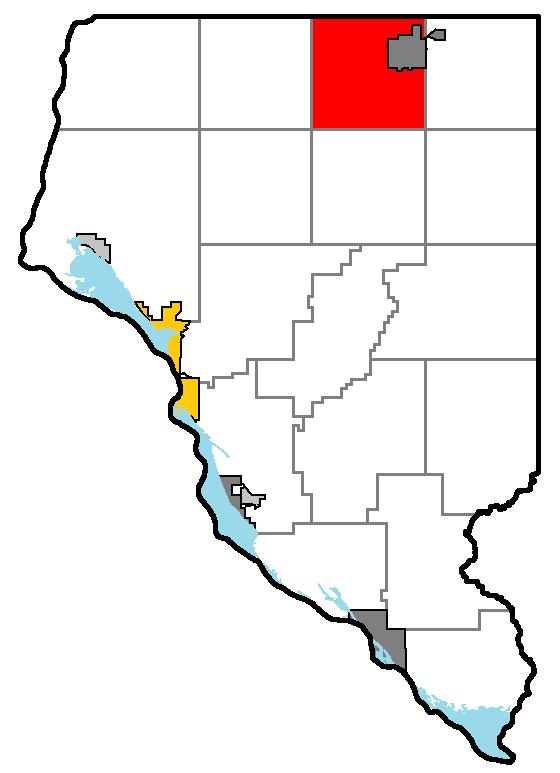
- Location of Mondovi, Buffalo County

- Location of Buffalo County, Wisconsin
- Coordinates: 44°31′59″N 91°42′59″W
- Country: United States
- State: Wisconsin
- County: Buffalo

Area
  - Total: 32.25 sq mi (83.5 km^{2})
  - Land: 32.13 sq mi (83.2 km^{2})
  - Water: 0.11 sq mi (0.28 km^{2})

Population (2020)
  - Total: 451
  - Density: 14.0/sq mi (5.42/km^{2})
- Time zone: UTC-6 (Central (CST))
  - Summer (DST): UTC-5 (CDT)
- Area code(s): 715 and 534
- GNIS feature ID: 1583736

Mondovi (/mɒnˈdoʊvi/ mon-DOH-vee) is a town in Buffalo County in the U.S. state of Wisconsin. The population was 451 at the 2020 census. The city of Mondovi is mostly surrounded by the town.

== Geography ==
The town of Mondovi is located along the northern border of Buffalo County, with Pepin County to the north. The town surrounds the city of the Mondovi on the north, west, and south sides; the east boundary of the city extends into the town of Naples to the east.

According to the United States Census Bureau, the town of Mondovi has a total area of 32.4 square miles (83.9 km^{2}), of which 32.3 square miles (83.6 km^{2}) is land and 0.12 square miles (0.3 km^{2}), or 0.36%, is water.

== Demographics ==
As of the census of 2000, there were 449 people, 153 households, and 119 families residing in the town. The population density was 13.9 people per square mile (5.4/km^{2}). There were 165 housing units at an average density of 5.1 per square mile (2.0/km^{2}). The racial makeup of the town was 96.88% White, 0.89% Native American, 1.11% Asian, and 1.11% from two or more races. 0.00% of the population were Hispanic or Latino of any race.

There were 153 households, out of which 37.3% had children under the age of 18 living with them, 67.3% were married couples living together, 5.2% had a female householder with no husband present, and 22.2% were non-families. 14.4% of all households were made up of individuals, and 3.9% had someone living alone who was 65 years of age or older. The average household size was 2.93 and the average family size was 3.29.

In the town, the population was spread out, with 30.3% under the age of 18, 6.2% from 18 to 24, 33.0% from 25 to 44, 22.7% from 45 to 64, and 7.8% who were 65 years of age or older. The median age was 34 years. For every 100 females, there were 96.1 males. For every 100 females age 18 and over, there were 110.1 males.

The median income for a household in the town was $39,792, and the median income for a family was $43,250. Males had a median income of $28,438 versus $19,688 for females. The per capita income for the town was $18,672. About 5.9% of families and 7.7% of the population were below the poverty line, including 11.1% of those under age 18 and none of those age 65 or over.
