= Jacki Rickert =

American cannabis rights activist

- Jacki Rickert at her home
- Born: May 13, 1951
- Died: December 26, 2017 (aged 66); Madison, Wisconsin
- Years active: 1989–2011
- Known for: Medical marijuana patients’ rights

Jacki Rickert (May 13, 1951 – December 26, 2017) was an American cannabis activist. She was founder and executive director of the medical marijuana patients advocacy group Is My Medicine Legal Yet? (IMMLY).

Rickert lived with connective tissue disorder Ehlers–Danlos syndrome and a neurological disorder that causes chronic pain called Advanced Reflex Sympathetic Dystrophy. Rickert was one of twenty-eight patients who were approved in 1990 to begin getting marijuana from the federal Compassionate Investigational New Drug Program before President George Bush ended the program, in 1991, but never got their medicine. Rickert travelled in her wheelchair 210 miles (340 km) from her home in Mondovi, Wisconsin, to the State Capitol in Madison on September 11–18, 1997, to raise awareness of her plight.

== Life and activism ==
While preparing for surgery at a hospital, Rickert tried smoking a joint to relax her muscles at a friend's suggestion when attendants were having difficulty inserting a needle into her arm. Her doctor, William E. Wright, M.D., prescribed cannabis to control her muscle spasms and pain and restore her appetite.

Rickert and Dr. Wright filed the necessary paperwork and she was admitted into the federal Compassionate Investigational New Drug Program in 1990. Rickert was approved to begin getting marijuana from the government before President George Bush ended the program, in 1991, but never got the medicine. Governor Bill Clinton told her that if elected he would "make it right" when Rickert met him during the 1992 presidential campaign, however, Clinton did not follow through with this.

Rickert travelled in her wheelchair 210 miles (340 km) from her home in Mondovi, to the State Capitol in Madison on September 11–18, 1997, to raise awareness of her plight. In an Eau Claire Leader-Telegram newspaper interview, Rickert said "We're just ordinary people trying to do an extraordinary thing."

On March 13, 2000, Rickert's home was raided by local police, who rifled through her belongings and confiscated her property. Buffalo County District Attorney James Duval did not file any charges.

Rickert died on December 26, 2017, at the University of Wisconsin Hospital in Madison, after a lifelong battle with illness.

== Political legacy ==
Medical marijuana bills introduced into the Wisconsin Legislature since 2001 have failed to pass. 2010's Assembly Bill 554 and Senate Bill 368, introduced in combined health committee on December 15, 2009, (called "The Jacki Rickert Medical Marijuana Act") which would have allowed seriously ill patients to grow up to twelve marijuana plants or purchase up to three ounces of dry marijuana from nonprofit dispensaries, did not get to the floor of the State Legislature because Wisconsin Senate Majority Leader Russ Decker and Assembly Speaker Mike Sheridan said they were not ready and did not have enough information about cannabis and whether the bill would hinder law enforcement.
