= Robert L. Pierce =

Robert L. Pierce was Chairman of the Republican Party of Wisconsin.

== Biography ==
Pierce was born Robert Layne Pierce on May 2, 1901 in Durand, Wisconsin. He died in 1968.

== Career ==
Pierce served as chairman from 1942 to 1948. In 1952, he was a delegate to the Republican National Convention that nominated Dwight D. Eisenhower for President of the United States. Additionally, he was a member of the Republican National Committee.

== See also ==
- The Political Graveyard
