= Mary Laschinger =

American business executive (born 1959)

Mary A. Laschinger
- Born: 1959 (age 66–67); Arkansaw, Wisconsin
- Education: University of Wisconsin-Eau Claire; University of Connecticut; Kellogg School of Management
- Years active: 1985-2020
- Known for: Former Chairman & CEO of Veritiv

Mary Laschinger (born circa 1959) is the former chairman and chief executive officer of Veritiv.

While she was the CEO of Veritiv, it was the largest woman-run company in Georgia.

== Early life and education ==
Laschinger was born around 1959 and grew up on her family's dairy farm in Arkansaw, Wisconsin. She was third from the youngest, with four brothers and three sisters. Her father took advantage of government subsidies and the family did not have many of the hardships of other small farms. She did laundry and scrubbed the floors as a child on the farm.

After graduating high school, she worked several odd jobs and spent several years attending a local tech school. She was 21 when she began attending university, and in 1985, she graduated with a degree in business administration from the University of Wisconsin-Eau Claire. She completed her Executive MBA at the University of Connecticut and her postgraduate studies at Northwestern University’s, Kellogg School of Management in executive management.

== Career ==
In 1985, Laschinger went to work as a production planner for Kimberly-Clark and then for James River (now Georgia-Pacific).

She joined International Paper in 1992, where she held various roles. She was a senior vice president of the company from 2007, until June 2014. From January 2010 until June 2014, she was the company's president of its xpedx division.

On July 1, 2014, Veritiv was formed upon the merger of International Paper Company's xpedx division with the parent company of Unisource Worldwide, at which time Laschinger became chairman and CEO of the company.

By June 2016, Laschinger was one of 21 women CEOs of Fortune 500 companies.

In 2019, with compensation of $7 million, she was the highest paid female CEO in the Atlanta metropolitan area.

In September 2020, Laschinger retired.
