= Lester Schnare =

Lester Llewellyn Schnare (May 15, 1884 – September 14, 1955) was an American diplomat.

== Biography ==
Schnare was born on May 15, 1884, to Henry and Anna Schnare in Mondovi, Wisconsin. On September 29, 1919, he married Margaret B. Kloss. He was known to be a member of Freemasonry. He died of a heart attack on September 14, 1955, while driving in Kentucky and was buried in Lexington, Virginia.

== Career ==
Schnare served as U.S. Vice Consul in Shanghai, China, from 1916 to 1917 and in Canton, China, from 1917 to 1918 when he moved to Yokohama, Japan, where he held the same position. Later he was promoted and serve as U.S. Consul in Yokohama in 1920 and 1921, as well as in Kobe, Japan, from 1920 to 1922. He then returned to China, where he served as consul in Shantou from 1922 to 1923. From 1923 to 1927 he held the post of consul in Cartagena, Colombia. He then served as consul in Breslau, Germany, from 1927 to 1931; Hamburg, Germany, from 1931 to 1935; and Milan, Italy, from 1935 to 1938. While in Milan, he made news when he helped to negotiate the successful release of consular clerk who had been arrested and sent to an Italian prison. Aside from his political positions, he worked as a schoolteacher, newspaper editor, and stenographer.
