= William Allison (Wisconsin politician) =

American politician

William Allison (1827–1881) was a Republican member of the Wisconsin State Assembly in 1880. He also served as a school board member.

Allison was born on January 1, 1827, in East Kilbride, Scotland. In 1851, Allison settled in Vernon, Wisconsin. He later moved to Maxville, Wisconsin, where he would own a farm. He married Mary Crockett from Scotland (1822–1890), with whom he raised seven children. A son, James Allison, would also become a member of the Wisconsin State Assembly. The Allisons were Presbyterian. He died on August 4, 1881, and is interred with his wife in Maxville.
