= Dutee A. Whelan =

American politician

Dutee A. Whelan (March 25, 1879 – June 17, 1939) was an American farmer, businessman, and politician.

Born in Mondovi, Buffalo County, Wisconsin, Whelan graduated from University of Wisconsin in 1900. Whelan was a farmer and was a cashier at the First National Bank of Mondovi. He was also involved with the Buffalo County Agricultural Society, the Mondovi Dairymen's Association, and the Equity Exchange Board. Whelan was involved with the lumber business and the cooperative movement. Whelan served as treasurer of the town of Mondovi. He also served on the school board and was the board treasurer. In 1923, Whelan served in the Wisconsin State Assembly and was a Republican. Whelan died in Mondovi, Wisconsin of heart disease at his farmhouse.
