= Waterville, Wisconsin =

- Town
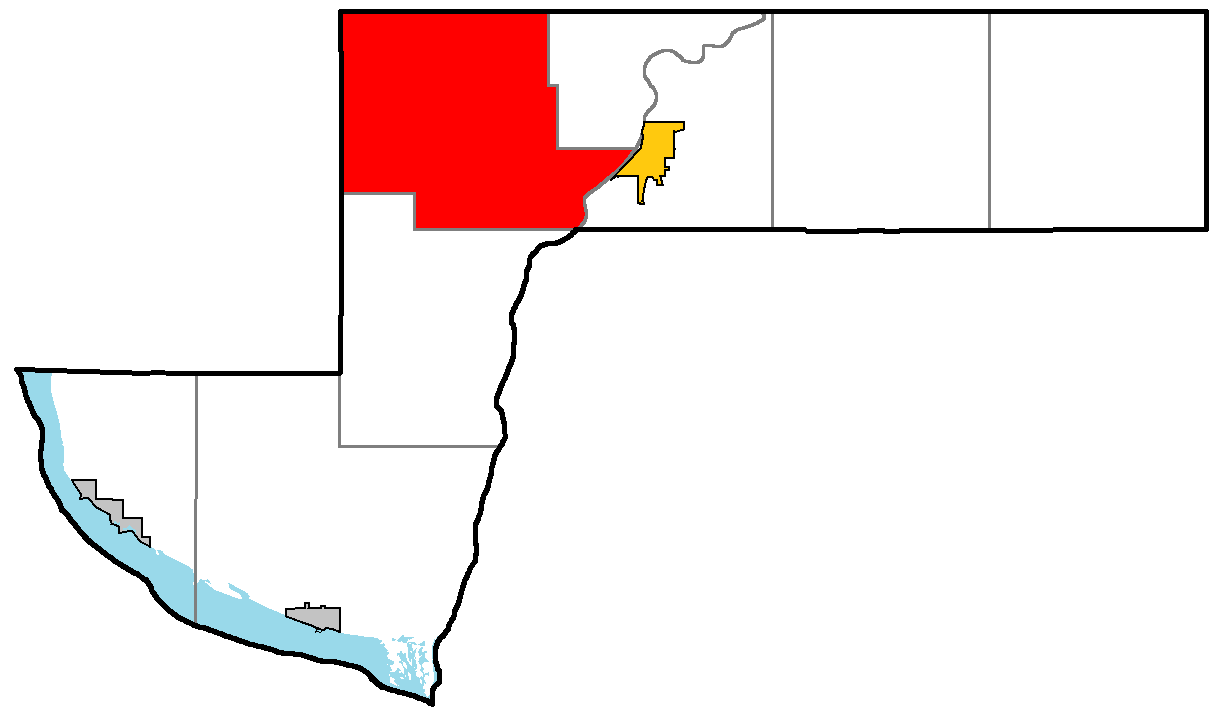
- Location of Waterville, Pepin County

- Location of Pepin County, Wisconsin
- Coordinates: 44°38′25.41″N 92°4′2.62″W
- Country: United States
- State: Wisconsin
- County: Pepin

Area
  - Total: 36.2 sq mi (93.7 km^{2})
  - Land: 35.7 sq mi (92.5 km^{2})
  - Water: 0.46 sq mi (1.2 km^{2})
- Elevation: 817 ft (249 m)

Population (2020)
  - Total: 829
  - Density: 23.2/sq mi (8.96/km^{2})
- Time zone: UTC-6 (Central (CST))
  - Summer (DST): UTC-5 (CDT)
- Area codes: 715 & 534
- FIPS code: 55-84025
- GNIS feature ID: 1584367
- Website: https://www.townofwaterville.com/

Waterville is a town in Pepin County, Wisconsin, United States. The population was 829 at the 2020 census. The unincorporated community of Arkansaw is located within the eastern portion of the town.

== Geography ==
According to the United States Census Bureau, the town has a total area of 36.2 square miles (93.7 km^{2}), of which, 35.7 square miles (92.5 km^{2}) of it is land and 0.5 square miles (1.2 km^{2}) of it (1.30%) is water.

== Demographics ==
As of the census of 2000, there were 859 people, 331 households, and 229 families residing in the town. The population density was 24.0 people per square mile (9.3/km^{2}). There were 351 housing units at an average density of 9.8 per square mile (3.8/km^{2}). The racial makeup of the town was 98.95% White, 0.12% Asian, 0.23% from other races, and 0.70% from two or more races. Hispanic or Latino of any race were 1.05% of the population.

Waterville had the highest percentage of people reporting Austrian ancestry in 2000 with 12.1% of its population.

There were 331 households, out of which 31.4% had children under the age of 18 living with them, 58.9% were married couples living together, 6.0% had a female householder with no husband present, and 30.8% were non-families. 25.7% of all households were made up of individuals, and 12.7% had someone living alone who was 65 years of age or older. The average household size was 2.60 and the average family size was 3.17.

In the town, the population was spread out, with 26.0% under the age of 18, 7.6% from 18 to 24, 30.8% from 25 to 44, 20.3% from 45 to 64, and 15.4% who were 65 years of age or older. The median age was 38 years. For every 100 females, there were 118.0 males. For every 100 females age 18 and over, there were 117.8 males.

The median income for a household in the town was $37,292, and the median income for a family was $41,250. Males had a median income of $27,163 versus $19,861 for females. The per capita income for the town was $15,482. About 7.9% of families and 10.0% of the population were below the poverty line, including 10.2% of those under age 18 and 17.0% of those age 65 or over.
