= Reformed Presbyterian Church of Vernon =

Historic church in Wisconsin, United States

- U.S. National Register of Historic Places
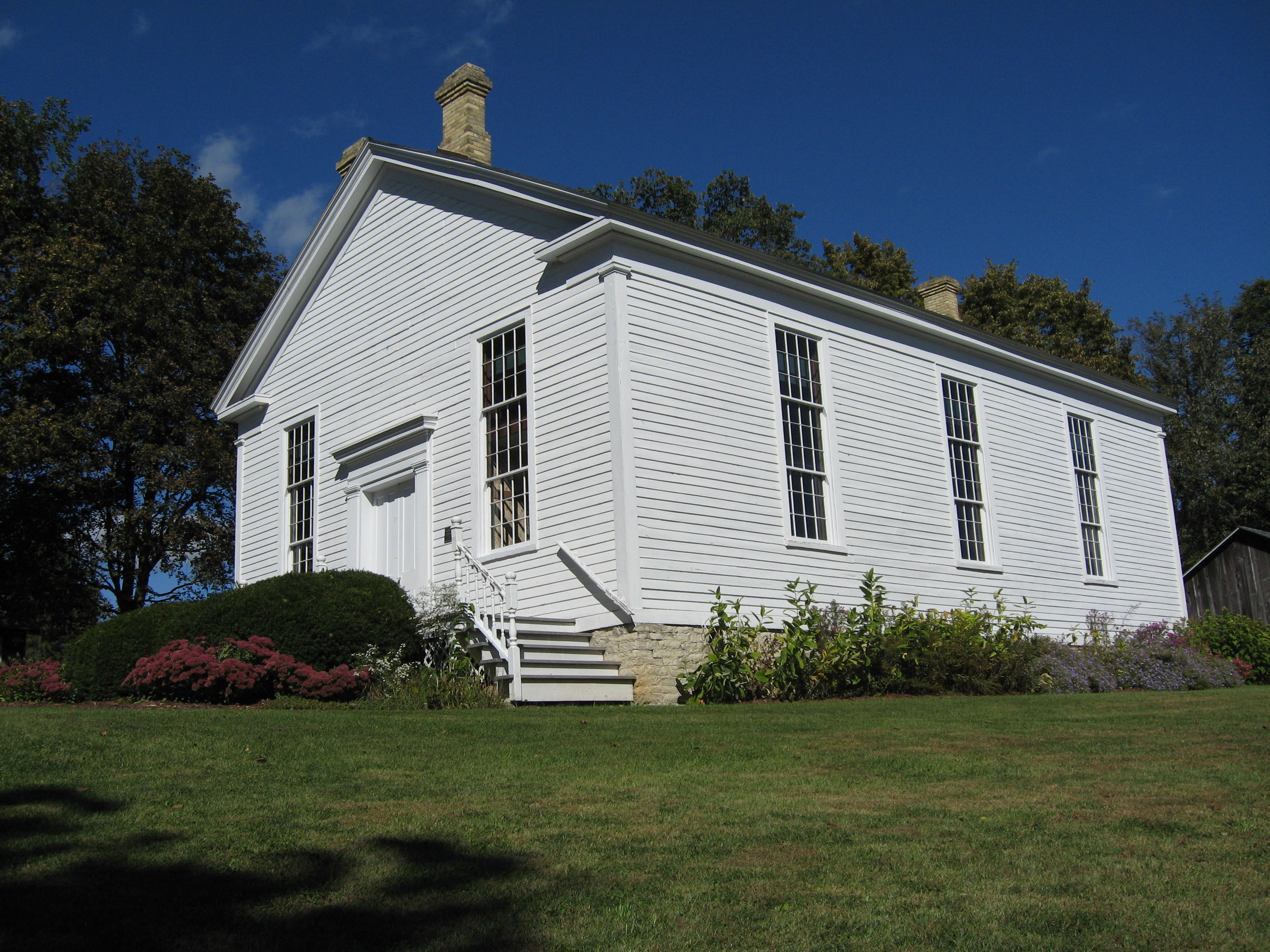
- Front and side of the church

- Location within Wisconsin Location within the United States
- Location: W234 S7710 Big Bend Road, Vernon, Wisconsin
- Coordinates: 42°54′55″N 88°13′7″W
- Area: 2 acres (0.81 ha)
- Built: 1853
- Architectural style: Greek Revival
- NRHP reference No.: 98001595
- Added to NRHP: January 7, 1999

The Reformed Presbyterian Church of Vernon is a historic church in the Town of Vernon in southeastern Waukesha County, Wisconsin, United States. It is also listed as Covenanter Church. Built in 1853, and formerly a congregation of the Reformed Presbyterian Church of North America, it has been listed on the National Register of Historic Places since 1999.

== History ==
Reformed Presbyterians first moved to the Vernon area in 1844. By 1847, several families (primarily from upstate New York) had arrived in the area, forming a small society of members, and the congregation was officially organized as Waukesha Reformed Presbyterian Church on 18 October 1848. Although the denomination already had a presbytery in Illinois, the church was part of the New York-based Rochester Presbytery, because without railroads, the Great Lakes made New York easier to reach. The congregation did not last long, however; it never had a settled pastor, and the elders died or moved away, causing the congregation to become disorganized on 18 November 1850. Some members remained, nevertheless: the present church building was erected in the town in Vernon in 1853, and Illinois Presbytery reorganized it as the Reformed Presbyterian Church of Vernon on 16 September 1856. Unlike before, the congregation was able to secure a pastor; ministers came and went, but the church was strong enough to continue during the times when its pulpit was vacant. The congregation was part of Iowa Presbytery from its foundation in 1863.

In 1875, the church had 70 communicant members, the most in its history. The church's membership began to decline consistently around 1900, and by 1925 there were only 19 members. The congregation was officially disorganized by the death of one of its two remaining elders in early 1940, although a few people remained on the roll of the "Vernon Mission" as late as 1949. By 1940, the congregation was not worshipping in its building, although after the church was disorganized, the remaining members replaced the building's roof in 1942 in accordance with their goal to see services restarted. Vernon was not listed in the denomination's official records after 1949.

== National Register ==
Although the structure has not been used for Reformed Presbyterian services since the 1940s, it is still known as the Reformed Presbyterian Church of Vernon. Its Greek Revival style of architecture led to its inclusion on the National Register of Historic Places on 7 January 1999.

== See also ==
- National Register of Historic Places listings in Wisconsin
