= Unisource Worldwide =

Unisource Worldwide, Inc.
- Company type: Subsidiary
- Founded: 1996; 29 years ago
- Owner: Bain Capital (60%; from 2002)
- Parent: Georgia-Pacific LLC (1999-2014); Veritiv (from 2014)

Unisource Worldwide, Inc. is a subsidiary of Veritiv and is a distributor of printing paper, packaging equipment and supplies, and facility maintenance equipment and supplies. It also provides logistics services to other companies through its truck fleet and warehouses.

== History and ownership ==
Unisource was formed in 1996 when it split off from Alco Standard Corporation. After acquiring several local and regional distributors, Unisource was itself acquired by Georgia-Pacific LLC in 1999. In 2002, Bain Capital purchased a 60 percent ownership in Unisource Worldwide. Georgia-Pacific retains 40 percent ownership.

In 2004, the CEO, Chuck Tufano, was succeeded by Allan Dragone.

In 2005, the company donated $50,000 to the American Red Cross International Response Fund in response to the 2005 earthquake and tsunami in Southeast Asia.

In 2014, the company became a subsidiary of Veritiv, following the spin-off of International Paper's xpedx.

== Sustainable business initiatives ==
Unisource was the first national paper distributor in the United States to attain certification from all three major chain-of-custody certification organizations: the Forest Stewardship Council™ (FSC®), the Sustainable Forestry Initiative® (SFI®), and the Programme for the Endorsement of Forest Certification (PEFC).

In 2010, Unisource began requesting supplies to fill out a Sustainability Scorecard "to ensure that environmental responsibility is being practiced and assessed according to standard industry procedures."

Unisource is a member of the Sustainable Packaging Coalition.

Unisource is a U.S. Green Building Council member.
