= Leonard Finseth =

Norwegian-American fiddler

Leonard Finseth (1911-1991) was a Norwegian-American fiddler from Mondovi, Wisconsin. He was well known for playing Old-time Norwegian dance music in his community, including waltzes, reels, schottisches, and polkas. He also recorded two albums: The Hills of Old Wisconsin and Scandinavian Old Time: Folk Fiddle from Wisconsin and was included in Scandinavian-American Folk Dance Music Vol. 2 and Across the Fields: Fiddle Tunes and Button Accordion Melodies. Other recordings of his music can be found at the Mills Music Library at the University of Wisconsin-Madison.

== Career ==
=== Early life ===
Leonard Finseth was born February 11, 1911, in Wisconsin. His father was a lumberjack, who emigrated from Trondheim in Norway as a young man. His mother was a second generation Norwegian-American. His family owned a dairy farm, where he lived for most of his life.

=== Music ===
Finseth first learned the organ from his sister as a small child. He started to learn to play the fiddle at age 17, and ordered his first fiddle from a mail order catalogue. He learned songs from local fiddlers, such as his uncle Ed Quall, Ingvald Syverson, and Otto Rindlisbacher. While most of Finseth's music was Norwegian, he also learned songs from fiddlers across the Mid-West, including Anglo-American and Swiss music. He could also play the guitar, organ, harmonica, and the violin. Although Finseth could read music, he usually preferred to learn songs by ear. He was also known to sometimes adapt Norwegian music traditionally played on the Hardanger fiddle for a conventional fiddle.

From the mid-1970s, Finseth was closely associated with Bob Andresen, a Scandinavian-American musician, who played guitar on-stage with him, and also produced LPs of Finseth's work. Bob Andresen was also the host of “Northland Hoedown,” a popular radio show in Duluth, MN, which featured regional musicians. Some of his music is also housed in the Mills Music Library in Madison, WI. Andresen described Finseth's music as more authentically Norwegian than many of his contemporaries, capturing the spirit of Norwegian music, while also producing something uniquely American. He also commented that Finseth's music was part of a living tradition, and he always puts his own spin on old tunes through his bowing technique.

Andresen received Finseth's records after his death, and sorted and labelled the records. He donated the materials in June 1995 to create the Leonard Finseth Collection in the Mills Music Library. The collection includes 50 reel-to-reel tapes and 34 audiocassettes, most of which were home-recordings, as well as photographs, newspaper clippings, and letters.

Finseth typically played for house parties and for dances held by Norwegian-American groups like The Sons of Norway, Norden Lodge, and the Modern Woodsman, but also performed in folk festivals, notably Fiddler's Fest in South Dakota, Nordic Fest in Iowa, and the Snoose Boulevard festival in Minneapolis. Finseth also performed at two Festivals of American Folklife. The first was in 1974 under the heading 'Old Ways in the New World.' Finseth performed alongside other Norwegian-American tradition-bearers, including a harmonica player, a Hardanger fiddler, a pianist, a rosemaler, and several dancers. The second time was two years later in 1976 for the Bicentennial celebration. He again performed under 'Old Ways in the New World,' which switched focus to different countries each week and contrasted Old World music and crafts, with its New World counterpart.

=== Work and Enlistment ===
Finseth worked at the Eau Claire Tire plant, part of the U.S. Rubber Company, which later changed its name to Uniroyal, beginning in March 1937, but soon lost his job due to rubber shortages. He enlisted in the US Navy on February 1, 1942, and was discharged October 26th, 1945. Finseth described his experiences serving during World War Two in "War Clouds" in 1978.

After the war, Finseth returned to his job at the tire factory and worked there for 35 years, before retiring in 1973.

Finseth died on June 16, 1991.
