= William H. Huntington =

American politician (1848–1916

William H. Huntington (May 8, 1848–1916) was a member of the Wisconsin State Assembly.

== Biography ==
Huntington was born on May 8, 1848, in Malone, New York. Later, he became heavily involved in the newspaper industry.

== Political career ==
Huntington was a member of the Assembly in 1883. He had previously been an unsuccessful candidate for the Assembly in 1880. Additionally, Huntington was village clerk of Durand, Wisconsin, now a city, and a justice of the peace. He was a Republican.
