= Naples, Wisconsin =

- Town
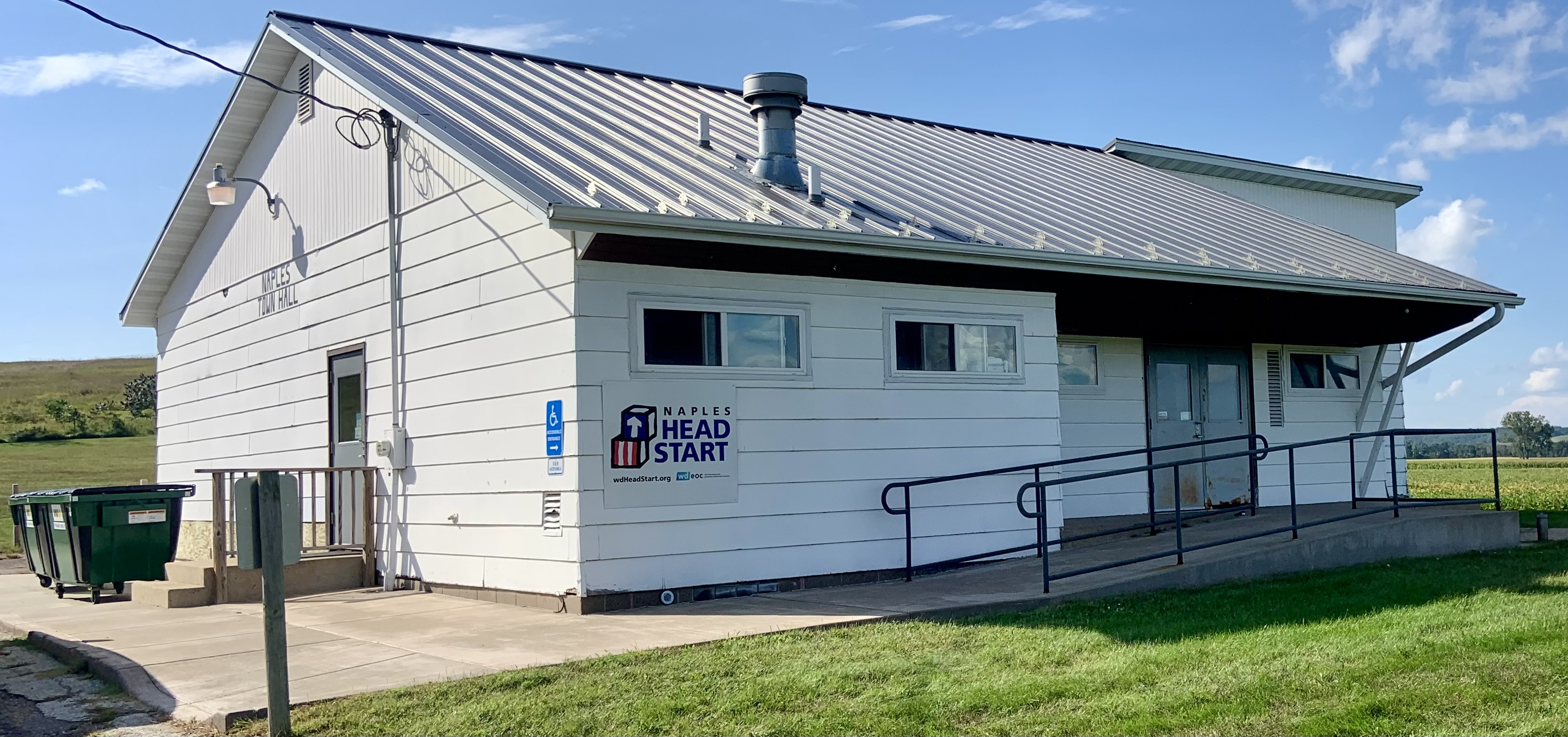
- Town hall

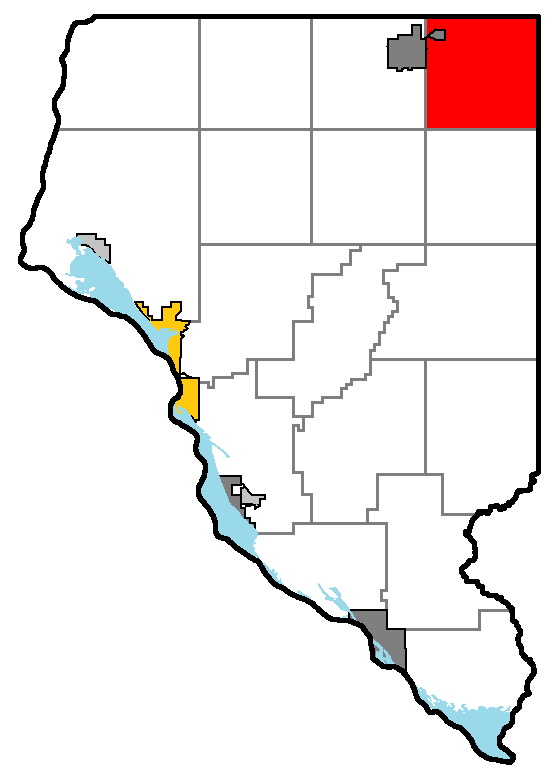
- Location of Naples, Buffalo County

- Location of Buffalo County, Wisconsin
- Coordinates: 44°33′48″N 91°35′24″W
- Country: United States
- State: Wisconsin
- County: Buffalo

Area
  - Total: 35.4 sq mi (91.8 km^{2})
  - Land: 35.3 sq mi (91.3 km^{2})
  - Water: 0.19 sq mi (0.5 km^{2})
- Elevation: 866 ft (264 m)

Population (2020)
  - Total: 697
  - Density: 19.8/sq mi (7.63/km^{2})
- Time zone: UTC-6 (Central (CST))
  - Summer (DST): UTC-5 (CDT)
- FIPS code: 55-55450
- GNIS feature ID: 1583777
- Website: https://www.naplestownshipwi.com/

Naples is a town in Buffalo County in the U.S. state of Wisconsin. The population was 697 at the 2020 census. Part of the city of Mondovi is surrounded by the town.

== Geography ==
Naples occupies the northeast corner of Buffalo County, with Eau Claire County to the north and Trempealeau County to the east. The city of Mondovi lies along part of the town's western border.

According to the United States Census Bureau, the town has a total area of 35.4 square miles (91.8 km^{2}), of which 35.3 square miles (91.3 km^{2}) is land and 0.19 square miles (0.5 km^{2}), or 0.52%, is water.

== Demographics ==
As of the census of 2000, there were 584 people, 221 households, and 161 families residing in the town. The population density was 16.4 people per square mile (6.3/km^{2}). There were 231 housing units at an average density of 6.5 per square mile (2.5/km^{2}). The racial makeup of the town was 99.14% White, 0.51% Native American, and 0.34% from two or more races. Hispanic or Latino of any race were 0.86% of the population.

There were 221 households, out of which 37.6% had children under the age of 18 living with them, 66.1% were married couples living together, 4.5% had a female householder with no husband present, and 26.7% were non-families. 23.1% of all households were made up of individuals, and 12.7% had someone living alone who was 65 years of age or older. The average household size was 2.64 and the average family size was 3.16.

In the town, the population was spread out, with 29.1% under the age of 18, 5.0% from 18 to 24, 28.3% from 25 to 44, 24.3% from 45 to 64, and 13.4% who were 65 years of age or older. The median age was 39 years. For every 100 females, there were 98.0 males. For every 100 females age 18 and over, there were 105.0 males.

The median income for a household in the town was $41,484, and the median income for a family was $45,000. Males had a median income of $28,125 versus $21,458 for females. The per capita income for the town was $17,318. About 3.6% of families and 3.3% of the population were below the poverty line, including 2.5% of those under age 18 and 8.2% of those age 65 or over.
