= Samuel F. Plummer =

American politician

Samuel Forest Plummer (May 28, 1853 – November 5, 1926) was a member of the Wisconsin State Assembly.

== Biography ==
Plummer was born on May 28, 1853, in Clarence, Wisconsin. His father, Samuel L. Plummer, and brother, William Edmunds Plummer, were also members of the Assembly.

== Career ==
Plummer was elected to the Assembly in 1896. Other positions he held include county surveyor of Pepin County, Wisconsin, and justice of the peace. He was a Republican.
