= Frank Schaettle =

American politician

Frank Schaettle (June 16, 1864 – May 14, 1926) was a member of the Wisconsin State Assembly.

== Biography ==
Schaettle was born on June 16, 1864, in Buffalo City, Wisconsin. In January 1898, he married Evangeline Blair. His brother, George, was a village supervisor and county board member. He was arrested for violation of the White-Slave Traffic Act in 1918. Schaettle died on May 14, 1926 and his estate valued at $282,000, was settled following a state supreme court decision in 1930.

== Career ==
Schaettle was elected to the Assembly in 1916. In addition, he was mayor of Alma, Wisconsin, and of Mondovi, Wisconsin, as well as a member of the Board of Education (school board) of Mondovi. He was a Republican.
