= Durand, Wisconsin =

- City
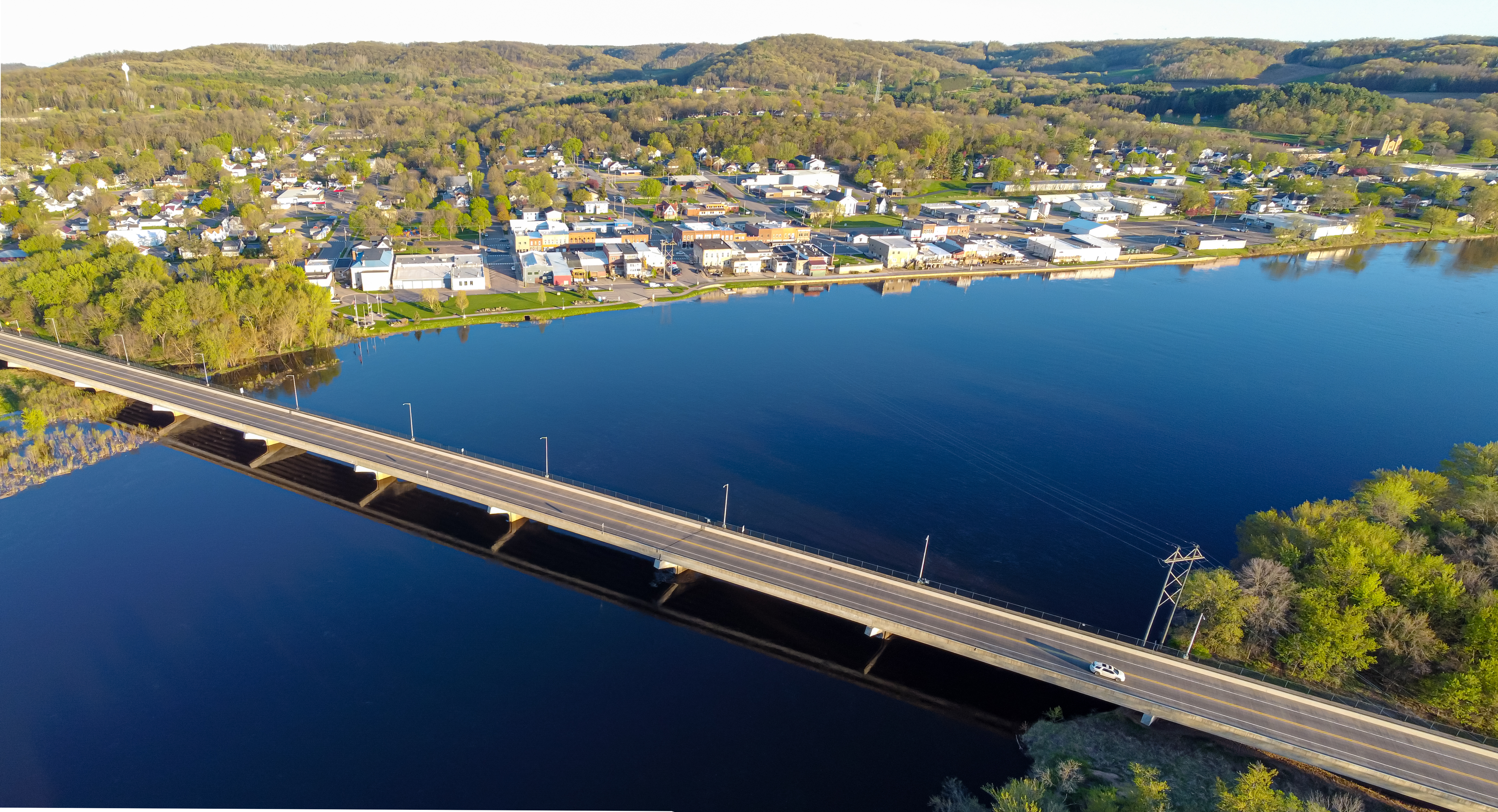
- US-10 crossing over the Chippewa River into Durand
- Motto: "On the Banks of the Chippewa"
- Location of Durand in Pepin County, Wisconsin.

- Location within Wisconsin Location within the United States
- Coordinates: 44°37′43″N 91°57′42″W
- Country: United States
- State: Wisconsin
- County: Pepin
- Established: April 12, 1887
- Founder: Miles Durand Prindle

Government
  - Type: Mayor-Council
  - Mayor: Patrick J. Milliren
  - Council President: Travis Hooker

Area
  - Total: 1.76 sq mi (4.55 km^{2})
  - Land: 1.75 sq mi (4.53 km^{2})
  - Water: 0.0077 sq mi (0.02 km^{2})
- Elevation: 719 ft (219 m)

Population (2020)
  - Total: 1,854
  - Density: 1,029.1/sq mi (397.33/km^{2})
- Time zone: UTC-6 (Central (CST))
  - Summer (DST): UTC-5 (CDT)
- ZIP Code: 54736
- Area codes: 715 & 534
- FIPS code: 55-21225
- GNIS feature ID: 1564195
- Website: Official website

Durand (/dəˈrænd/ də-RAND) is a city in and the county seat of Pepin County, Wisconsin, United States. Situated on the banks of the Chippewa River approximately 15 miles (24 km) from its confluence with the Mississippi River, the city borders the Town of Durand. The population was 1,854 at the 2020 census.

== History ==
The Durand area was first settled in 1856 when 21-year-old Miles Durand Prindle came up the river in a keel boat named the "Dutch Lady," and took government land on the site of the present city. Originally named Bear Creek, Durand was incorporated on April 12, 1887.

== Geography ==
Durand is located at 44°37′42″N 91°57′42″W (44.628512, -91.961718).

According to the United States Census Bureau, the city has a total area of 1.86 square miles (4.82 km^{2}), of which 1.75 square miles (4.53 km^{2}) is land and 0.11 square miles (0.28 km^{2}) is water.

== Demographics ==
Historical population
Census	Pop.	Note	%±
1880	642		—
1890	1,154		79.8%
1900	1,458		26.3%
1910	1,503		3.1%
1920	1,517		0.9%
1930	1,590		4.8%
1940	1,858		16.9%
1950	1,961		5.5%
1960	2,039		4.0%
1970	2,103		3.1%
1980	2,047		−2.7%
1990	2,003		−2.1%
2000	1,968		−1.7%
2010	1,931		−1.9%
2020	1,854		−4.0%
2020 (est.)	1,789		−7.4%
U.S. Decennial Census

=== 2010 census ===
As of the census of 2010, there were 1,931 people, 838 households, and 509 families living in the city. The population density was 1,103.4 inhabitants per square mile (426.0/km^{2}). There were 906 housing units at an average density of 517.7 per square mile (199.9/km^{2}). The racial makeup of the city was 98.1% White, 0.5% Native American, 0.2% African American, 0.1% Asian, 0.1% Pacific Islander, 0.3% from other races, and 0.8% from two or more races. Hispanic or Latino of any race were 0.8% of the population.

There were 838 households, of which 28.5% had children under the age of 18 living with them, 45.1% were married couples living together, 11.2% had a female householder with no husband present, 4.4% had a male householder with no wife present, and 39.3% were non-families. 35.3% of all households were made up of individuals, and 18.4% had someone living alone who was 65 years of age or older. The average household size was 2.20 and the average family size was 2.83.

The median age in the city was 44.2 years. 22.5% of residents were under the age of 18; 8% were between the ages of 18 and 24; 20.7% were from 25 to 44; 27.1% were from 45 to 64; and 21.8% were 65 years of age or older. The gender makeup of the city was 47.6% male and 52.4% female.

=== 2000 census ===
As of the census of 2000, there were 1,968 people, 829 households, and 509 families living in the city. The population density was 1,229.4 people per square mile (474.9/km^{2}). There were 876 housing units at an average density of 547.3 per square mile (211.4/km^{2}). The racial makeup of the city was 98.93% White, 0.20% Native American, 0.15% Asian, 0.15% Black or African American, 0.05% Pacific Islander, and 0.51% from two or more races. 0.20% of the population were Hispanic or Latino of any race.

There were 829 households, out of which 29.9% had children under the age of 18 living with them, 49.6% were married couples living together, 9.8% had a female householder with no husband present, and 38.5% were non-families. 35.3% of all households were made up of individuals, and 20.5% had someone living alone who was 65 years of age or older. The average household size was 2.29 and the average family size was 2.99.

In the city, the population was spread out, with 24.8% under the age of 18, 7.8% from 18 to 24, 24.4% from 25 to 44, 19.9% from 45 to 64, and 23.1% who were 65 years of age or older. The median age was 41 years. For every 100 females, there were 90.3 males. For every 100 females age 18 and over, there were 87.5 males.

The median income for a household in the city was $30,064, and the median income for a family was $42,260. Males had a median income of $33,000 versus $19,250 for females. The per capita income for the city was $18,103. About 7.6% of families and 9.3% of the population were below the poverty line, including 10.2% of those under age 18 and 9.3% of those age 65 or over.

== Healthcare ==
AdventHealth Durand is a 25 bed critical access hospital located in Durand and a level IV trauma center. There are two general practice primary care clinics in Durand. Although the city has a hospital and two primary care clinics, it is located in both a mental health and primary care Health Professional Shortage Area, technically qualifying the area as a medical desert. By the year 2035, Durand is expected to have a deficit in primary care physicians. There are no behavioral health physicians in Durand.

== Education ==
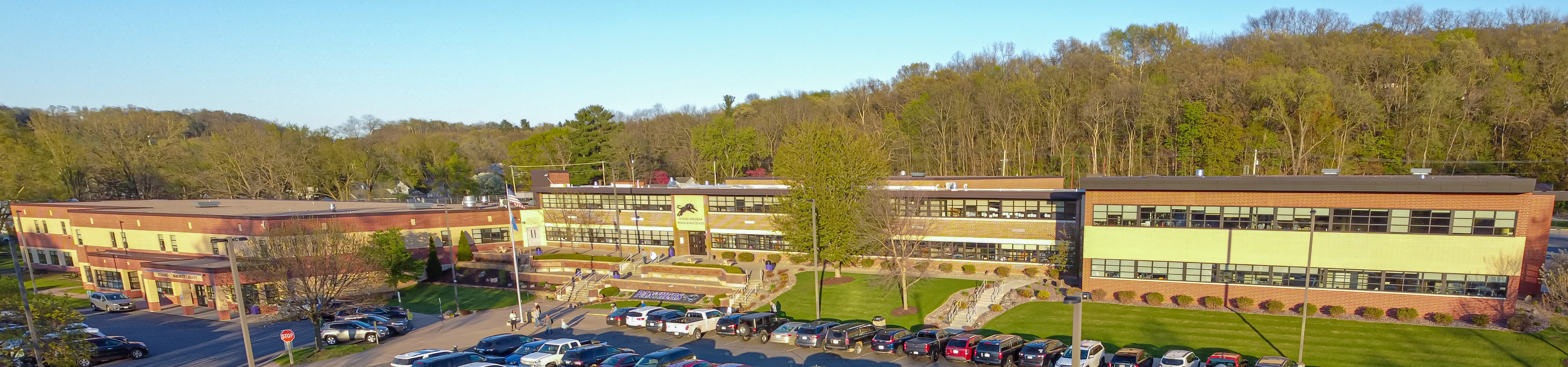
Durand High/Middle School

Durand MS/HS High School is the local public middle/high school. Caddie Woodlawn Elementary School educates students from grades Pre-Kindergarten through fifth grade in the area.

During the early 1950s, consolidation of schools in Durand and environs resulted in some Catholic institutions serving as public schools, causing controversy and protests from Protestant residents based on the principle of "separation of church and state".

== Media ==
Durand is part of the Eau Claire/La Crosse media market. Due to the city’s geographic proximity, various outlets are available over-the-air and through MVPDs from the adjacent Twin Cities market.

=== Radio ===
AM radio stations
Frequency	Call sign	Name	Format	Owner
1430	WRDN	Reel Country 1430	Country	Durand Broadcasting, LLC

FM radio stations
Frequency	Call sign	Name	Format	Owner
107.3	W297CH (WRDN-AM Translator)	Reel Country 1430	Country	Durand Broadcasting, LLC

== Notable people ==
- James Allison - Wisconsin State Representative
- Thomas Dreier - editor, writer, and publisher
- Karl J. Goethel - Lawyer and legislator
- Horace E. Houghton - Washington and Wisconsin state legislator
- William H. Huntington - Wisconsin State Representative
- John Morgan - Wisconsin State Representative
- Helen Parkhurst - American educator
- Robert L. Pierce - Chairman of the Republican Party of Wisconsin
- Samuel L. Plummer - Wisconsin State Representative
- George E. Scott - Wisconsin State Senator
- George Tarrant Sr. - Wisconsin State Representative and first mayor of Durand
- Mamre H. Ward - Wisconsin State Representative
