= James Allison (Wisconsin politician) =

American politician

James Allison (1858 – after 1919) was an American politician. He was a member of the Wisconsin State Assembly in 1912–13.

== Biography ==
Allison was born on July 25, 1858, to Mary Crockett and William Allison on a farm in Maxville, Wisconsin, that he would later own. In 1880, his father was also a member of the Wisconsin State Assembly. Allison attended high school in Durand, Wisconsin. In addition to farming, he was a Sunday school superintendent, teacher and conducted a creamery.

On January 30, 1889, Allison married Florence Mace (1864–1921), a school teacher originally from Clinton county, New York, with whom he raised three sons. One of them, Robert M., would become Clerk of Maxville. Like his parents, Allison and his wife are interred in Maxville.

== Political career ==
Allison was a member of the Assembly during the 1913 session. Other positions he held include school board member. He was a Republican.
