= WRDN =

- Durand, Wisconsin; United States
- Broadcast area: Eau Claire, Wisconsin
- Frequency: 1430 kHz C-QUAM AM stereo
- Branding: Reel Country 1430 & 107.3 WRDN

Programming
- Format: Country music
- Affiliations: ABC News Radio; Motor Racing Network; Performance Racing Network

Ownership
- Owner: Durand Broadcasting, LLC

History
- First air date: 1968
- Former call signs: WRDN (1968–2003); WQOQ (2003–2011)
- Call sign meaning: W Radio DuraNd

Technical information
- Licensing authority: FCC
- Facility ID: 65633
- Class: D
- Power: 2,000 watts day; 152 watts night
- Transmitter coordinates: 44°35′7″N 91°54′44″W
- Translator: 107.3 W297CH (Durand)

Links
- Public license information: Public file; LMS
- Webcast: Listen Live
- Website: reelcountry1430.com

WRDN (1430 AM) is a radio station operating in Durand, Wisconsin. It was owned by Zoe Communications, which operated the station as a simulcast of WDMO, until it was acquired in 2011 by Durand Broadcasting. In July 2011, WRDN was granted a U.S. Federal Communications Commission (FCC) construction permit to move to a new transmitter site.

== History ==
The station was launched in 1968 as WRDN, operating in Durand. The station's original owner, F.M. Radio Network, Inc., was a locally based company. Sister station WDMO was launched sometime before 1976 with the call sign WRDN-FM.

F.M. Radio Network sold the stations to Zoe Communications in 2001. Zoe changed the AM signal's call sign to WQOQ in 2003, before returning to the original WRDN calls in 2011. Under Zoe Communications' ownership, the stations' programming originated from studios in Menomonie, a larger city closer to the Eau Claire broadcast market, and local programming targeted to Durand was no longer available. Through the 2000s, however, the AM signal was frequently either dark or operating at reduced transmitter power.

Durand Broadcasting, a company incorporated by broadcaster Brian Winnekins and his wife Karla, acquired the station in 2011 with the intention of reviving a local radio service in Durand. Brian Winnekins was previously a farm news reporter for WCOW-FM in Sparta.

Now programmed independently of its former parent, the station was relaunched in March 2012 with a mix of local news, sports and farm reports and country music from the syndicated Real Country service.
