= National Register of Historic Places listings in Sawyer County, Wisconsin =

Location of Sawyer County in Wisconsin

This is a list of the National Register of Historic Places listings in Sawyer County, Wisconsin. It is intended to provide a comprehensive listing of entries in the National Register of Historic Places that are located in Sawyer County, Wisconsin. The locations of National Register properties for which the latitude and longitude coordinates are included below may be seen in a map.

There are 4 properties and districts listed on the National Register in the county.

This National Park Service list is complete through NPS recent listings posted March 21, 2025.

== Current listings ==
	Name on the Register	Image	Date listed	Location	City or town	Description
1	Hall-Raynor Stopping Place	Hall-Raynor Stopping Place	August 14, 1979 (#79000115)	N of Ojibwa on WI G 45°47′59″N 91°07′00″W	Ojibwa	Log tavern built around 1874 - one of many rest stops on the old Chippewa Trail stage line, which generally followed the course of modern Highway 40 from Chippewa Falls north into the pinery. This stopping place served loggers, trappers and rivermen with a saloon downstairs and sleeping rooms upstairs. In 1917, when logging waned, the place became a demo farm for Faast's Wisconsin Colonization Company. Now believed to be the oldest surviving structure in Sawyer County.
2	Moody's Camp Lodge		November 7, 2019 (#100004556)	10472 West Murphy Blvd. 46°06′14″N 91°14′16″W	Spider Lake	Rustic lodge built in the 1920s by an Ojibwe carpenter for Ted Moody, Chicago car dealer and auto mechanic who needed to escape the fumes of cars. Now a B&B called Spider Lake Lodge.
3	North Wisconsin Lumber Company Office	North Wisconsin Lumber Company Office	May 7, 1980 (#80000403)	Florida Ave. 46°00′37″N 91°29′19″W	Hayward	2-story brick headquarters built in 1889 by one of the major logging companies in the Namekagon watershed, founded by A. J. Hayward and R. L. McCormick, with fireproof vault in basement, offices on first floor, and rooms for visiting officials above.
4	Ojibwa Courier Press Building	Ojibwa Courier Press Building	March 1, 1982 (#82000712)	E of Radisson at 110 Ojibwa Mall; 45°47′50″N 91°06′56″W	Ojibwa	1922 newspaper office in Ojibwa, a community planned to settle immigrant farmers in Wisconsin's cutover, by Benjamin Faast's Wisconsin Colonization Company. That company failed in 1929, but it planted a seed of the Federal Land Bank system.

== See also ==
- List of National Historic Landmarks in Wisconsin
- National Register of Historic Places listings in Wisconsin
- Listings in neighboring counties: Ashland, Barron, Bayfield, Douglas, Price, Rusk, Washburn
