= Hall-Raynor Stopping Place =

- U.S. National Register of Historic Places
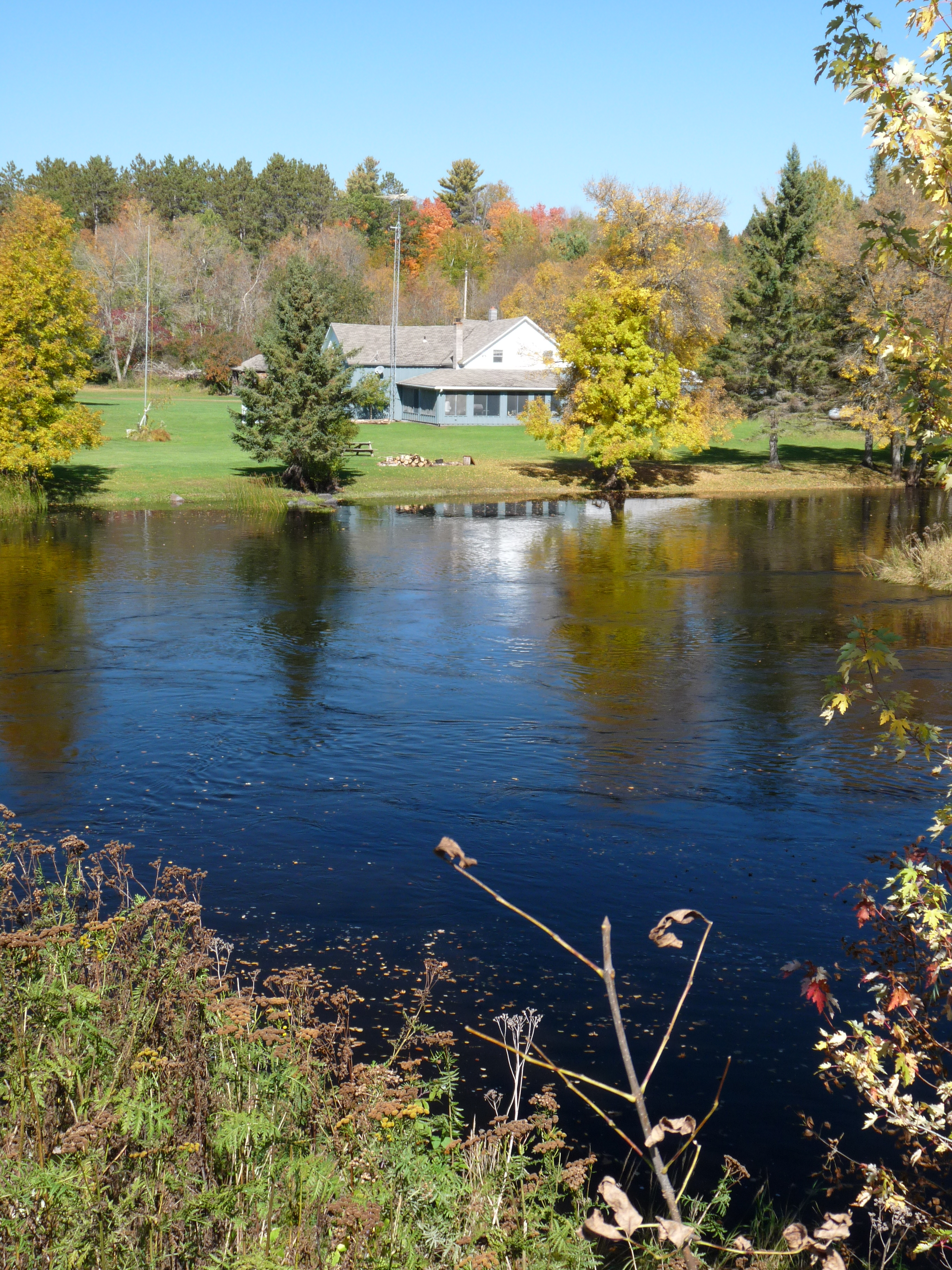
- Location: N of Ojibwa on WI G, Ojibwa, Wisconsin
- Coordinates: 45.7997°N 91.11685°W
- Built: ca. 1874
- NRHP reference No.: 79000115
- Added to NRHP: August 14, 1979

The Hall-Raynor Stopping Place was built around 1874 beside the Chippewa River - one of many rest stops on a tote road that ran north from Chippewa Falls to supply early logging operations upstream. In 1979 the structure was placed on the National Register of Historic Places, considered significant as the last remaining stopping place from that era on the river and the oldest known surviving structure in Sawyer County.

The Chippewa River had long been a highway for Indians, traders and explorers. In the mid-1800s, lumbermen also began to work their way up the river. Jean Brunet and company had built a sawmill at Chippewa Falls around 1840. Other companies built mills at Eau Claire, and they all established logging camps upstream in the forests along the Chippewa and its tributaries, to cut pine logs in winter and float them down the river to the mills in spring and summer.

Logs could be floated down the river, but men, animals, tools and supplies also needed to go up-river to the logging camps. These supplies were hauled on a rough "tote road" called the Chippewa Trail which ran to the west of the river for sixty miles. On that trail, horses and oxen pulled wagons, a stage hauled people, and loggers walked. A traveler coming down the trail in November 1873 met about sixty wagons and 200 men walking to lumber camps upstream. Stopping places along the trail provided places for these travelers to spend the night and get food and drink. Hall-Raynor was one of these stopping places.

Beneath the fairly modern-looking materials of today's vacation home lie walls of horizontal squared timbers, probably built by Charles C. Drew around 1874. Drew bought the property in 1873. The main 26x24 foot block was built while he owned it, with the bottom tamarack or cedar logs set on a "mudsill" foundation, where packed mud and log blocks supported the bottom logs - a quick way to start a cabin in a wilderness where bags of cement were hard to come by. The corners of the original section were joined by dovetails. The roof was covered with wood shingles.

In 1876 William and Samuel Hall bought the place from Drew and began to operate as a stopping place. Two years later, they sold the enterprise to Alfred Raynor, W.E. McCord, and A.J. Hayward. The stopping place served trappers and loggers moving on the river and the tote road, and men from nearby lumber camps. (One operated just across the river for a while, and others nearby.) The operators charged 25 cents for a meal and the same for a night's lodging. Jesters and musicians often entertained the visitors. Raynor later recalled, "You had to step high at night after the stoppers retired, as 100 often slept on the floor." Among them were occasionally lumber barons like Frederick Weyerhaeuser.

The original wing had sleeping rooms upstairs, with four dormitory rooms around a central hall with a chimney. A 20-foot wing was added during the Hall or Raynor tenure, with the ground-level housing a saloon and the upstairs probably used for extra sleeping space. Facing the river was an open shed-roofed veranda, which has since been enclosed. The place also had some outbuildings: a fieldstone storage building, a stone root cellar, and an outhouse. Raynor probably ran the stopping place until around 1911, when major log drives down the Chippewa ended. After that he continued to farm for a few years, then sold the farm to the Wisconsin Colonization Company in 1917.

The Wisconsin Colonization Company was a business venture of Eau Claire land developer Benjamin Faast to sell cut-over lands in Sawyer and Rusk counties to farmers. After logging, the stump and brush-covered forties were of little value to the lumber companies, and there were immigrants and Americans interested in starting a farm inexpensively. Rather than simply sell stump-clogged forties, Faast's company offered the beginnings of a farm with a house and barn, a few acres cleared, a cow, two pigs, six chickens, tools, seeds, and farming advice. The company also promised a nearby planned community just across the river from the Raynor farm - Ojibwa. Faast's company bought the Raynor farm to use as a demonstration farm to show prospective farm-buyers, and as a stock farm to supply cows, pigs and chickens as farm packages were sold. But farming in the northern stumplands was difficult, sales were slow, the depression of 1920 did not help, and the Wisconsin Colonization Company closed around 1930.

The place changed owners. By the 1970s, when it was surveyed for the Wisconsin Inventory of Historic Places, the house was sagging. The mud-sill foundation kept the bottom logs moist, and the bottom two tiers of logs had badly rotted. As a result, the dining room floor was mound-shaped because of a boulder pushing up beneath.

== Other stopping places ==
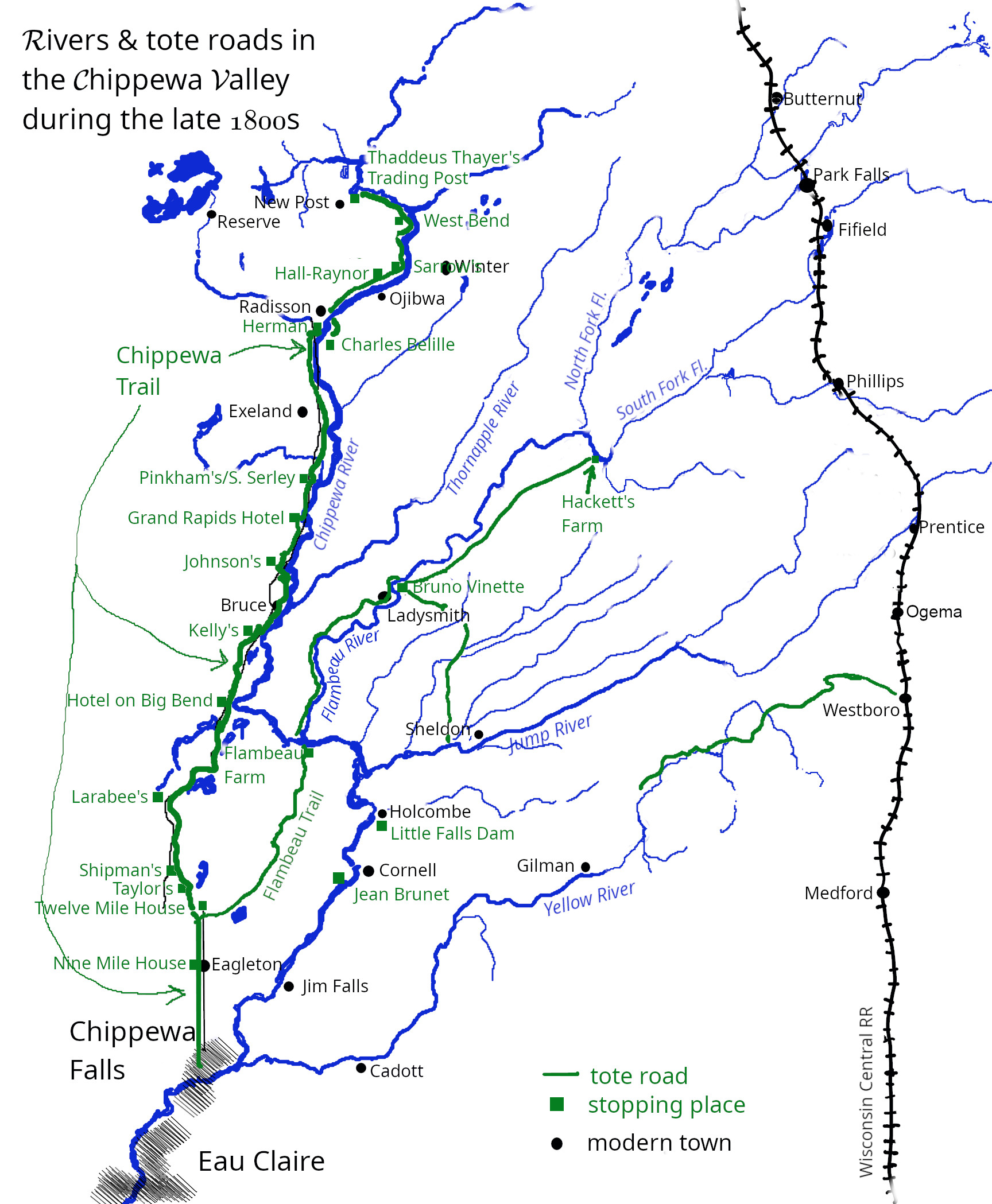
Logging tote roads and stopping places in the Chippewa valley in the 1800s

Hall-Raynor is one of many logging-era stopping places that operated in the Chippewa Valley. A string of them were sprinkled along the Chippewa Trail which ran from Chippewa Falls to the Chippewa Flowage. They typically offered places for men to sleep and a "hovel" for the horses, with feed for both. Some were fairly nice like Nine Mile House (nine miles north of Chippewa Falls at what is now Eagleton), which had a dance hall. Some were basic, like Charlie Belille's crowded home about eight miles below Hall-Raynor.

The Chippewa Trail ran straight north out of Chippewa Falls, following the course of modern Highway 124 for about twelve miles. Around the end of 124, it angled west to pass Long Lake. From there it followed the course of modern highway 40 west of the Chippewa River, past the site of modern Bruce, Exeland, and Radisson, with a stopping place every five or ten miles along the way. Johnson's north of Bruce was probably one of the first stopping places, built in the 1860s where a ferry crossed the river. Ten miles above Hall-Raynor, the trail ended at Trading Post, which now likes beneath the modern Chippewa Flowage. A stage line ran from Chippewa Falls to Trading Post. The trail was busiest in the fall and spring; a traveler in November 1878 reported that he met 200 men on foot and sixty horse teams heading up the trail to their lumber camps.

12 Mile House, built in the 1860s, was a grand stopping place north of Eagleton, where the Flambeau Trail branched off from the Chippewa Trail. As of 2026, it is neglected and collapsing.

The Flambeau Trail branched off from the Chippewa Trail near Cornell Lake and followed the course of modern County E through the hilly terminal moraine to Flambeau Farm, just south of modern Flater's Resort, where the Flambeau River joins the Chippewa. Flambeau Farm was a staging area for the Shaw Lumber Company of Eau Claire, with a hotel, a wanigan (store), a nearby mixed community of white and Indian families, and a ferry across the Chippewa. The trail continued up the west side of the Flambeau to Bruno Vinette's farm a mile above modern Ladysmith. French-Canadian Vinette was an early logger who by 1872 had cleared this farm in the wilderness to house oxen and horses through the summer and to grow hay and vegetables to supply his logging camps in the winter. He later added a hotel at his farm which served hard liquor to lumberjacks and passersby, with a crude jail for troublemakers. The Flambeau Trail continued upstream south of the river to Hackett's farm, another stopping place started in 1872. From there it eventually continued to connect with the Wisconsin Central Railroad south of Park Falls. This trail was also called the "101 trail."
