= Meadowbrook =

Meadowbrook may refer to:

== Places ==
- Meadowbrook, Queensland, Australia, a suburb of Brisbane

=== United States ===
- Meadowbrook, Alabama, an unincorporated community
- Meadowbrook, California, a census-designated place
- Meadowbrook, Cornwall, New York, a hamlet
- Meadowbrook, Illinois, an unincorporated community
- Meadowbrook, Pennsylvania, an unincorporated community
- Meadowbrook, Syracuse, New York, a neighborhood
- Meadowbrook, Seattle, Washington, a neighborhood
- Meadowbrook, Virginia, a census-designated place
- Meadowbrook, Wisconsin, a town

== Transportation ==
- Meadowbrook (SEPTA station), in Abington, Pennsylvania
- Meadowbrook (UTA station), in South Salt Lake, Utah
- Meadowbrook State Parkway, on Long Island
- Dodge Meadowbrook, a U.S. car from the 1950s
- Meadowbrook, a type of horse-drawn vehicle

== Other uses ==
- Meadowbrook Farm, a former name of the Bank of New Hampshire Pavilion in New Hampshire
- Meadowbrook Polo Club, on Long Island, New York
- John Sweek House, Tualatin, Oregon, also known as Meadowbrook

== See also ==
- Meadowbrook Country Club (disambiguation)
- Meadowbrook High School (disambiguation)
- Meadow Brook (disambiguation)
