= Sawyer County, Wisconsin =

County in Wisconsin, United States

- County
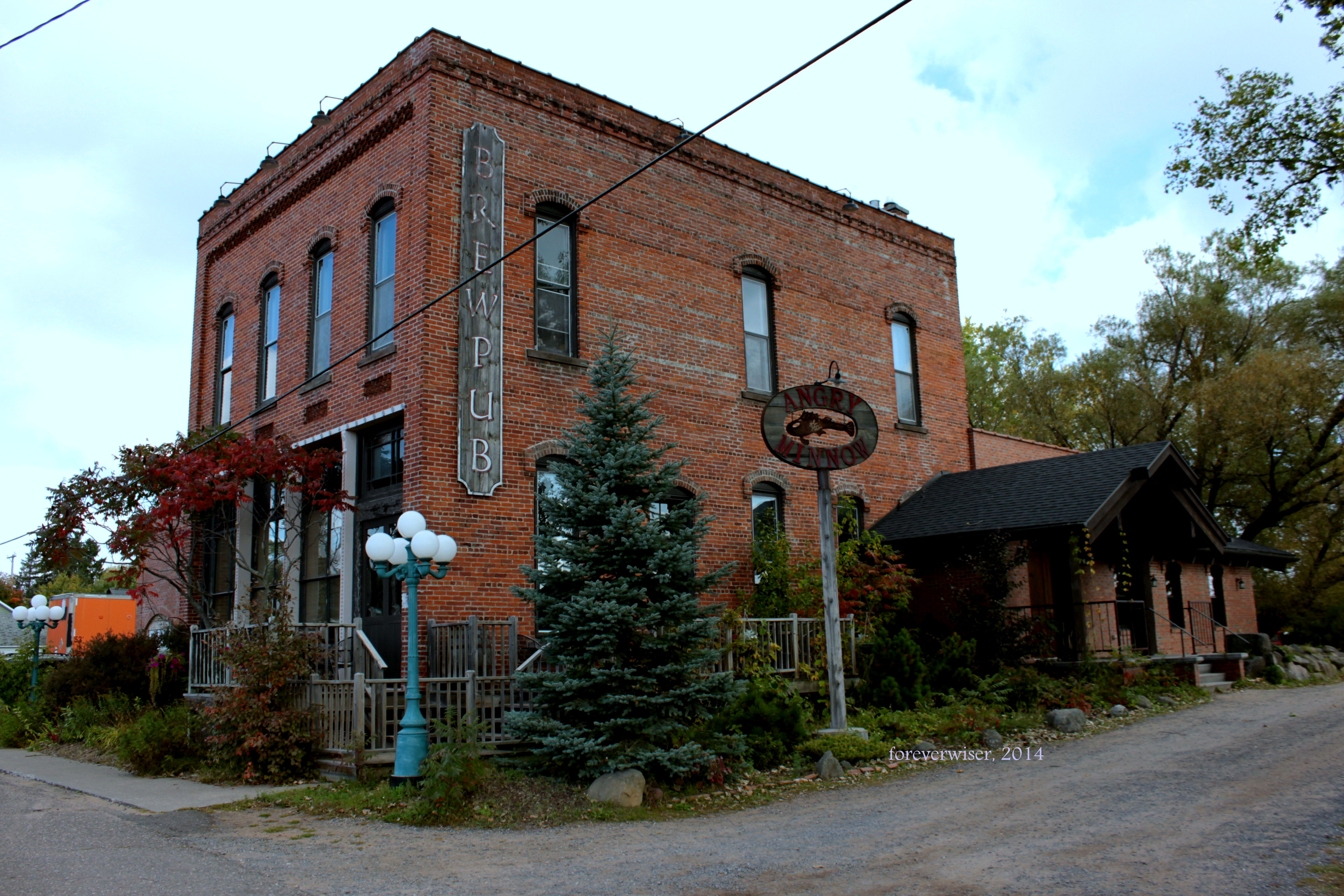
- North Wisconsin Lumber Company Office in Hayward, Wisconsin

- Location within the U.S. state of Wisconsin
- Coordinates: 45°54′N 91°08′W
- Country: United States
- State: Wisconsin
- Founded: 1885
- Named for: Philetus Sawyer
- Seat: Hayward
- Largest city: Hayward

Area
  - Total: 1,350 sq mi (3,500 km^{2})
  - Land: 1,257 sq mi (3,260 km^{2})
  - Water: 93 sq mi (240 km^{2}) 6.9%

Population (2020)
  - Total: 18,074
  - Estimate (2025): 18,846 ▲
  - Density: 14.4/sq mi (5.6/km^{2})
- Time zone: UTC−6 (Central)
  - Summer (DST): UTC−5 (CDT)
- Congressional district: 7th
- Website: www.sawyercounty.gov

Sawyer County is a county in the U.S. state of Wisconsin. As of the 2020 census, its population was 18,074. Its county seat is Hayward. The county is largely rural, with no community outside Hayward exceeding 400 people. It partly overlaps with the reservation of the Lac Courte Oreilles Band of Lake Superior Chippewa Indians. The U.S. Department of Agriculture considers the county a high-recreation and high-retirement destination.

Before settlement, the county was covered by virgin timber—home and hunting grounds for Native Americans. During the late 1800s that timber was cut, and the wealth generated started Hayward and the other towns of today. Since then, the area's economy has diversified into farming, then government services and tourism.

== History ==
=== Indians and fur trade ===
The area that is now Sawyer County was contested between the Dakota and Ojibwe peoples in the 18th century as part of the Dakota-Ojibwe War. Oral histories tell that the Ojibwe defeated the Dakota locally in the Battle of the Horse Fly on the upper Chippewa River in the 1790s. By this time, Lac Courte Oreilles had become the site of an Ojibwe village, which explorer Jonathan Carver described after traveling through in 1768:

[The village] is situated on each side of the river (which at this place is of no considerable breadth) and lies adjacent to the banks of a small lake. This town contains about forty houses, and can send out upwards of one hundred warriors, many of whom were fine stout young men. The houses of it are built after the Indian manner, and have neat plantations behind them ...

Ojibwes allowed trader Michel Cadotte to build a fur-trading post in the area in 1800, with its clerk John Baptist Corbin the first white resident of the future Sawyer county. The United States acquired the region from the Ojibwe Nation in the 1837 Treaty of St. Peters, but the Ojibwe retained the right to hunt and fish on treaty territory. After elements of the U.S. tried to move all Ojibwe west of the Mississippi resulting in the Sandy Lake Tragedy, the Ojibwe people successfully negotiated to establish the permanent Lac Courte Oreilles Indian Reservation in the 1854 Treaty of La Pointe.

Charles Belille was the first white settler in what would become Sawyer County. He was a French-speaker from Quebec who around 1830 paddled with a crew of voyageurs up through the Great Lakes to La Pointe. He married an Ojibwe woman named Esther Crane and came south to settle on the Chippewa River near the mouth of the Couderay in the late 1830s. In this wilderness he built a cabin, trapped and traded, and raised a large family. Each spring he and Indian helpers paddled his huge double dugout canoe down to Chippewa Falls to exchange furs for supplies. When U.S. surveyors marked the section corners in 1853, they found Belille logging around his home—the start of small-scale logging.

=== Large-scale pine logging ===
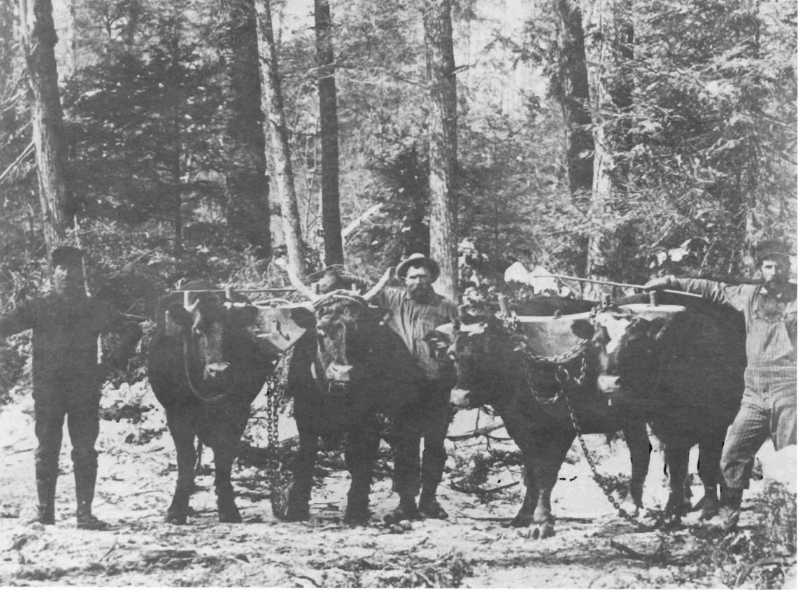
Ox teams logging in Sawyer County, Wisconsin in 1911

Large-scale logging in the area began later. Sawmills in Chippewa Falls and Eau Claire started operating in the 1840s, but it took them a while to work up the Chippewa River to what would become Sawyer County. By 1876 enough lumberjacks were working near modern Ojibwa that the Hall-Raynor Stopping Place had begun offering meals and a place to sleep for them. Loggers were also working the Sawyer County part of the Flambeau River by the 1870s. From both the Chippewa and Flambeau, lumberjacks drove logs on the spring floods to the mills at Chippewa Falls and Eau Claire. Knapp, Stout & Co. began logging at Lake Chetac in 1882, floating their logs down the lakes and the Red Cedar River to their sawmill in Menomonie.

In the winter of 1878 lumberman A.J. Hayward walked up the frozen Chippewa River, assessing timber and mill sites. On the Namekagon River below large stands of timber he found a good spot for a dam and millpond, and he probably knew that a railroad was soon to be built through the area. He bought what he could of the mill site and brought in Robert Laird McCormick and the Laird Norton Company as financial backers. The Omaha Railroad laid new tracks up the Namekagon in 1880. Deciding to work with Hayward, the railroad sold him more land that he needed and named the stop for him. Next year, with all the pieces in place, Hayward and his associates formed the North Wisconsin Lumber Company and in 1883 opened their "Big Mill" at Hayward—the sawmill that would drive the economy of that corner of Sawyer County for decades. Logs from the Chippewa and Red Cedar were processed elsewhere, but at Hayward the logs were sawed and planed right there, boards were shipped out, mill jobs were created, and a city grew.

The Ojbwe at Lac Courte Oreilles were pressed for a while to move to live with the Bad River band east of Ashland, but they resisted and in 1872 they surveyed the boundaries of the reservation at Lac Court Oreilles. Their land held valuable stands of virgin pine, and the lumber companies managed to log most of it from 1884 to 1888, paying the Ojibwe only 0.007 of the profits, which historian James Clifton wrote, "must have been one of the best timber bargains of the century."

=== Booming growth ===
Sawyer County was split out from early Chippewa and Ashland counties in 1883 and organized in 1885, with Hayward its county seat. The county is named for Philetus Sawyer, a lumberman from New England who represented Wisconsin in the U.S. House of Representatives and U.S. Senate in the 19th century. In 1882 Hayward amounted to a rail siding, water tank, a logging camp, and no more than a dozen structures. By the 1885 census, the little boom-town had grown to 1,069 people, including 357 females, 400 children, and a few elderly. 51% of them were born in the U.S., 33% Scandinavia, 10% Canada, and the remainder from northern Europe. Outside of Hayward but in Sawyer County, 409 families were counted, 252 of them headed by Indians.

Children needed schools. In 1835 a Methodist mission posted three Ojibwe men at Lac Courte Oreilles to teach, but that ended by 1840. In 1877 a rural school was started for the children of Charles Belille's little settlement on the Chippewa. The Bishop school was another rural school, started in 1882 five or ten miles upriver from Belille's. In 1882 a private school was started in A.J. Hayward's upstairs for his two children and later one of R.L. McCormick's. The following fall a public school opened in Hayward in a former billiards hall, with 59 pupils including the Hayward and McCormick children. In 1884 a new school was built in Hayward—a four-room, two-story building. It was used one year, then burned on the first day of classes in 1885. Classes continued in a hall above a store and in the courthouse, while the school was rebuilt. Around 1888 a high school was started in Hayward. As the population grew, schools would continue to expand.

Meanwhile, other institutions were appearing. The Sawyer County Times began print in 1883. McCormick and Frederick Weyerhaeuser founded the Sawyer County Bank in 1884. McCormick was involved in establishing a free library. A kindergarten was added in 1889. By 1898 there were general stores, saloons, blacksmith, harness shop, hotels, ice houses, feed mill, a sausage factory, barber, millinery shop, a town hall, and several churches. In the 1900 census, 1864 people were counted in the village of Hayward, 873 on the Lac Courte Oreilles reservation, and 856 elsewhere in the county.

=== End of logging and what followed ===
White and red pine were the most desirable lumber, good for building and floating down a stream. The last significant amounts in Sawyer County were cut from 1899 to 1905 southwest of Radisson in the Meteor Hills. Since they were far from driveable streams, the logs were hauled out on a temporary logging railroad to the Chippewa River, then floated to the mills downstream. As the choice pine dwindled, loggers and sawmills shifted to less desirable pine and hardwoods. In 1902 North Wisconsin Lumber sold its Big Mill in Hayward to Edward Hines Lumber Company. The mill was renamed North Wisconsin Lumber & Mfg. Co. and continued sawing. It finally burned in 1922. That was not the end of logging. Smaller operators have continued logging and sawing lumber in the area ever since.

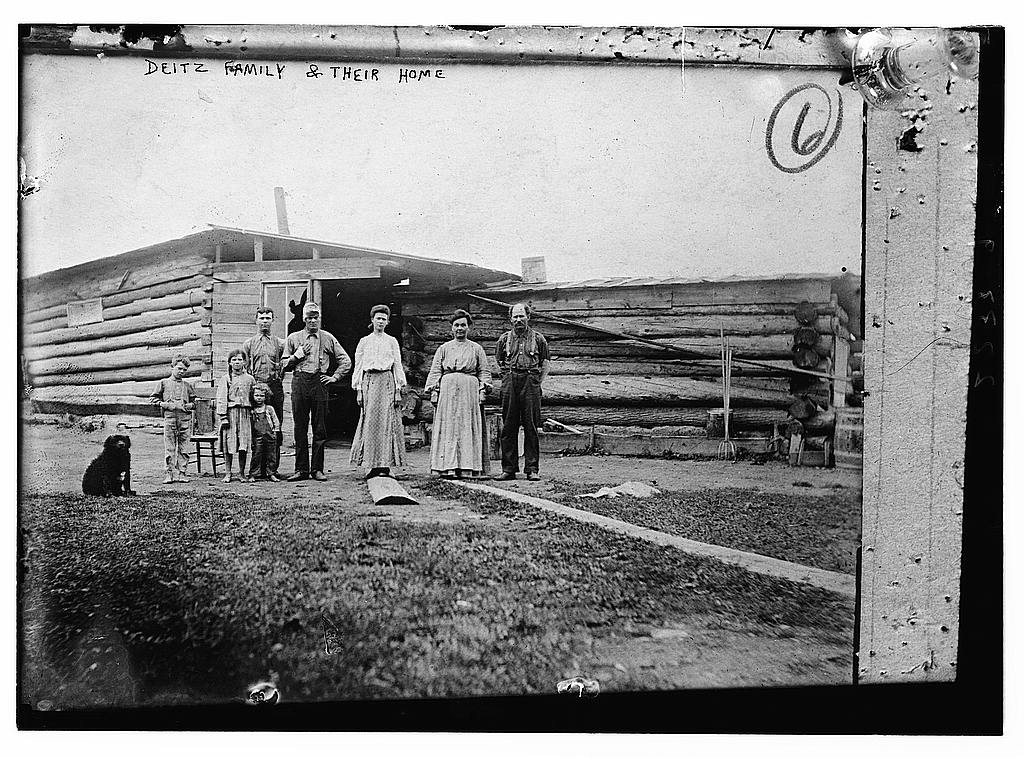
Settlers in 1911

The earliest settlers farmed on a small scale, starting with Charles Belille, who cleared a little forest around his cabin to grow potatoes and some vegetables. When logging began, he expanded his clearing to sell the camps vegetables and hay, and he hired Indians to work his fields. After land was logged, settlers bought some of the resulting cutover forties and started scratching out small farms, grazing a few animals, planting some crops among the stumps and brush, and working in the logging camps in winter. The UW College of Agriculture in 1896 began promoting the northern cutover as good farmlands for settlers, touting the good soils and advising on various crops. Some settlers simply bought a cheap, unimproved forty or eighty from a lumber company or from the county after the lumber company let its land go tax-delinquent. Others, after 1917, paid more for a "made-to-order farm" at Meadowbrook or Ojibwa from Benjamin Faast's Wisconsin Colonization Company, which sold the start of a new farm as a package aimed at immigrants and city folks: a prebuilt farmhouse ("an attractive cottage painted a cheerful color,") a barn, a cow, two pigs, some tools, and possibly a few acres of land already cleared of stumps. Anticipating isolation as a problem for these new farmers, Faast's company even promised community in the planned town of Ojibwa. Some of the farms succeeded, but many faltered in the face of stumps, thin soils, limited markets, and a short growing season. By 1929 the UW was no longer promoting new farms in the northland, and Faasts's Colonization Company went bankrupt.

Indians were present through all of this of course, working as loggers, driving logs, working in the sawmills. Some integrated into Western society and some did not. The lack of integration was considered a problem by many. By the late 1800s the U.S. government was trying to address the "Indian problem" with boarding schools which aimed to make Indian children into farmers and factory workers and Christians. With good intentions, R.L. McCormick, head of the Hayward mill, argued for this, and a boarding school was established at Hayward in 1901. Most of its students came from the Lac Courte Oreilles reservation ten miles away, but others came from farther around Wisconsin and Minnesota. The students were forbidden to speak Ojibwe and had little contact with their families, so they were cut off from Ojibwe culture. The school was short on teachers and the children spent only half the school-day in classes so they could work in the school farm and kitchen the rest of the day. And it was crowded and unsanitary, so there was much more sickness than in the general population. The boarding school closed in 1934.

The Flambeau Flowage was created in 1923 when Northern States Power Company built the hydroelectric dam near Winter. It generated electricity and recreation opportunities, but it also flooded 6,000 acres upstream in the Lac Courte Oreilles reservation, submerging Indian homes, graves and wild rice beds. The new flowage submerged the village of Post, and NSP moved it to New Post, but the power company reneged on agreements to stock fish in the new flowage, to replant wild rice, to move some homes, and to move 700 graves. When the initial 50-year-license ended in the 1970s, the Ojibwe and the American Indian Movement took over the dam and ended up wresting some control back from NSP.

Conservation was of little concern early on, but by the late 1800s people could see that the virgin timber wouldn't last forever. Around the turn of the century many thought that farmers would tame the cut-over lands, but many of the farms failed and the land went back to brush. In 1909 about 65% of Sawyer County was cutover. When wildfires repeatedly ripped through the brush and slashings, threatening the remaining homes, major conservation efforts began. In the late 1920s the federal government began buying up tax-delinquent forest lands and in 1933 established the Chequamegon National Forest, occupying a chunk of the northeast corner of Sawyer County. The Flambeau River State Forest was started about the same time. In the 1930s during the Great Depression, Civilian Conservation Corps camps near Loretta, Winter, Smith Lake, Moose Lake, and Ghost Creek cleared fire breaks, built fire towers, and planted trees. By 1938 the county had 69,000 acres of county forest, 2,000 in state forest, and by 1951 120,200 acres in national forest land. Today much of the land that was cut over has been restored to healthy, scenic forest, in which plots are periodically cut. After each cut, there is generally a plan for reforestation.

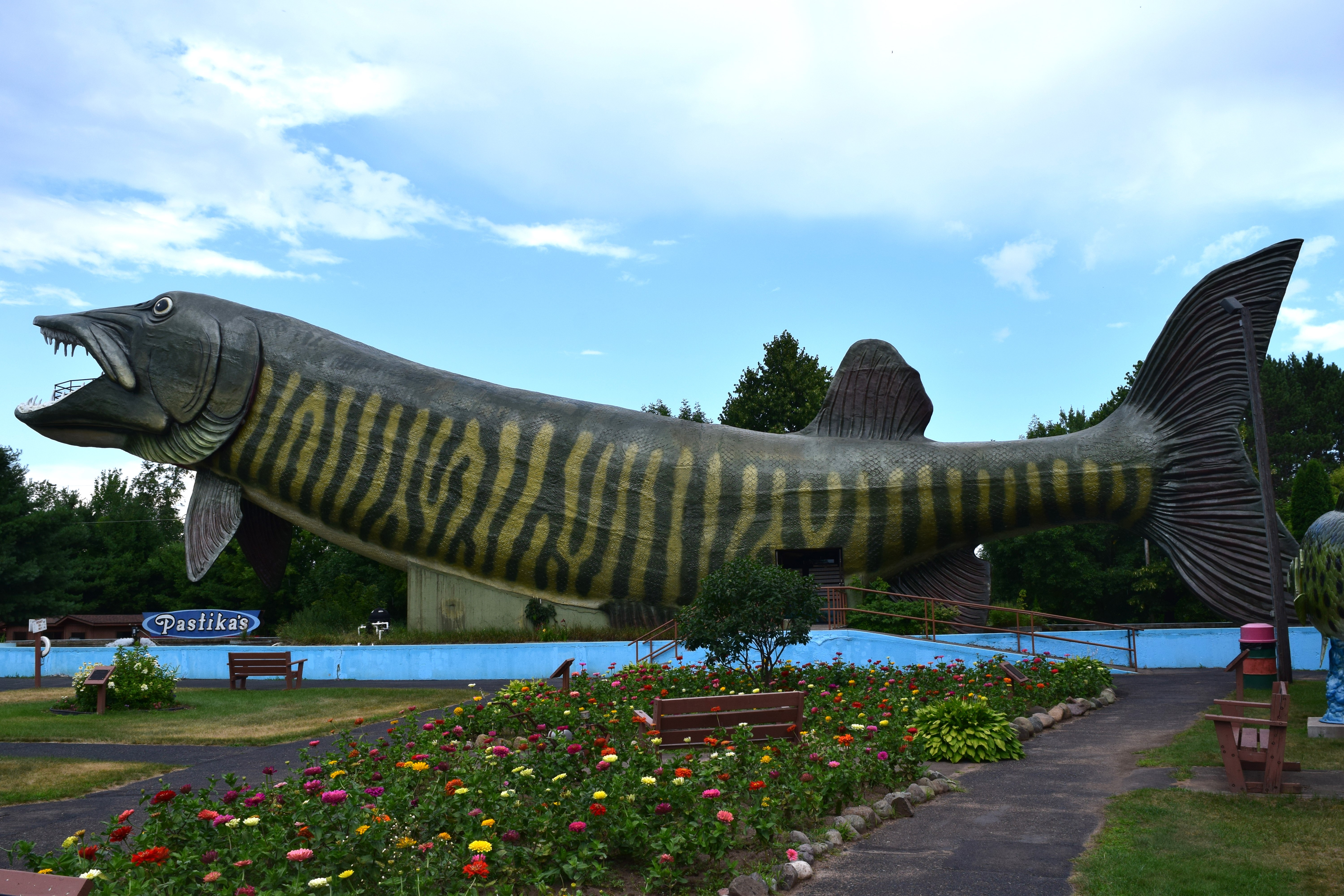
The Big Muskie at the National Freshwater Fishing Hall of Fame in Hayward

People have always fished and hunted the area. In 1878 the Burnett County Sentinel mentioned a hunting and fishing party passing through, headed for the upper Namekagon. In 1885 a summer resort was built on Spider Lake. As logging waned, the railroads promoted fishing and hunting in this area. As farming waned, some of the locals started renting out cabins to sportsmen. Outsiders built resorts too, like Chicagoans Ted and Myrtle Moody, who opened their lodge at Spider Lake in 1922. In the 1930s the CCCs and the Wisconsin Conservation Department built a fish hatchery at Hayward to stock the lakes and rivers around the area. Cal Johnson caught a world record Musky in 1949, which led Hayward to dub itself the "Musky Capital of the World," and produced the National Muskie Festival Association. Recreational opportunities continue in the county, expanded from fishing and hunting to boating, canoeing, kayaking, snowmobiling, ATVing, hiking, skiing, biking, and camping. The casinos that the Ojibwe opened after 1988 have unlocked a new stream of outside tourist dollars, and are now among the largest employers in the county.

== Geography ==
According to the U.S. Census Bureau, the county has a total area of 1,350 square miles (3,500 km^{2}), of which 93 square miles (240 km^{2}) (6.9%) are covered by water. It is the fifth-largest county in Wisconsin by land area.

The northwest half of the county toward Hayward is sprinkled with many lakes, and generally has sandy loam soils. The Namekagon River drains Hayward's corner. The southwest corner around Lake Chetac flows into the Red Cedar River. The Chippewa River flows down through the middle of the county, rising in the man-made Lake Chippewa and exiting the county near Exeland. Its tributary the Couderay River drains Lac Courte Oreilles and other small lakes around the reservation. Most of the southeast half of the county, toward Connor Lake, has heavier silt loam soils, with fewer lakes and more swamps. It is drained by the Flambeau and Thornapple rivers and their tributary streams. Most streams throughout the county flow southwesterly, with the exception of the Couderay.

=== Major highways ===
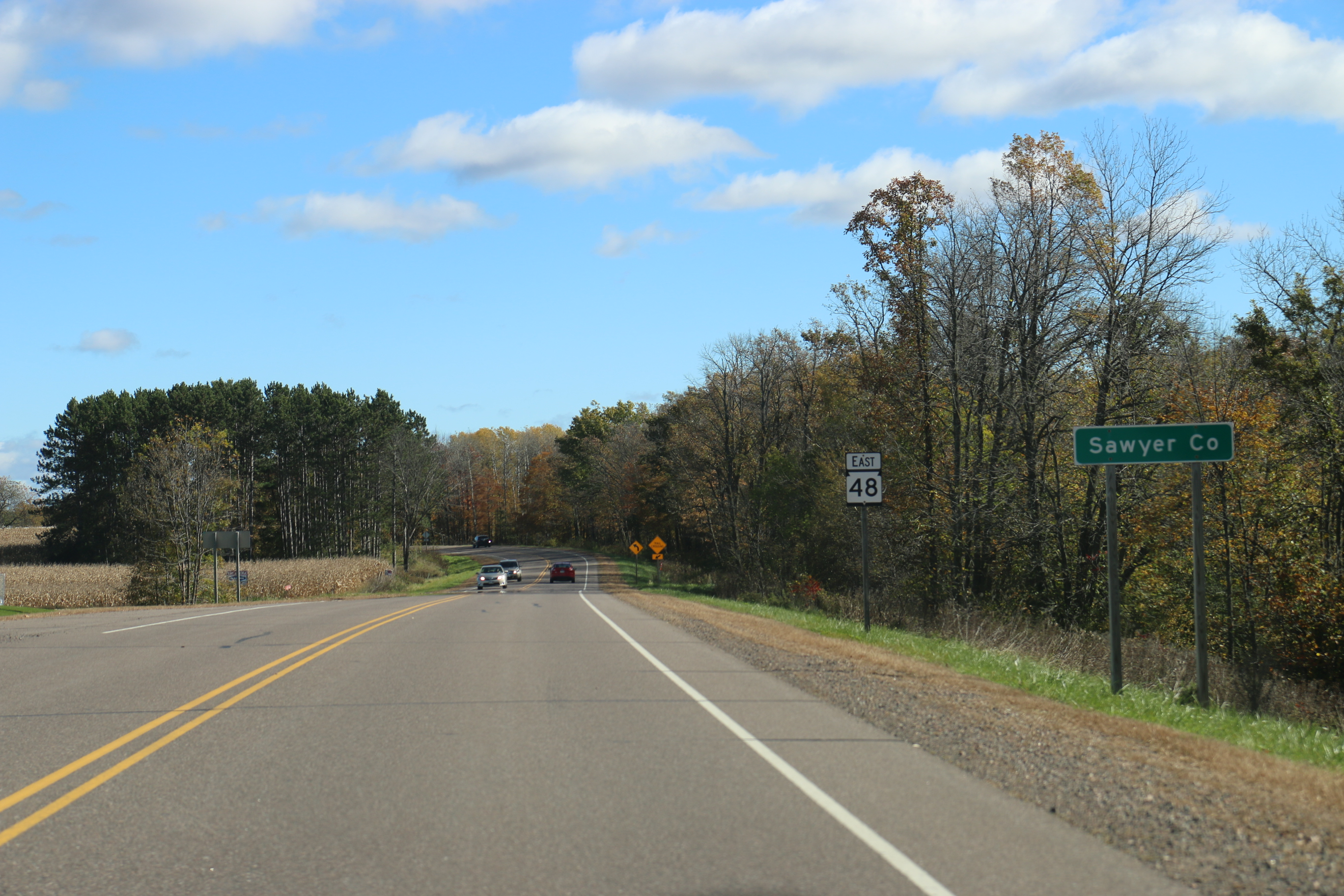
The sign for Sawyer County on WIS48

- U.S. Highway 63
- Highway 27 (Wisconsin)
- Highway 40 (Wisconsin)
- Highway 48 (Wisconsin)
- Highway 70 (Wisconsin)
- Highway 77 (Wisconsin)
- Sawyer County Highway B is the busiest rural roadway on average in all of Sawyer County with a high count of 5900 vehicles daily, according to the Wisconsin Department of Transportation's average daily traffic maps for 2008.

=== Railroads ===
- Canadian National
- Wisconsin Great Northern Railroad

=== Airport ===
Sawyer County Airport (KHYR) serves the county and surrounding communities.

=== Adjacent counties ===
- Bayfield County – north
- Ashland County – northeast
- Price County – east
- Rusk County – south
- Barron County – southwest
- Washburn County – west
- Douglas County – northwest

=== National protected areas ===
- Chequamegon National Forest (part)
- Saint Croix National Scenic Riverway (part)

== Demographics ==
Historical population
Census	Pop.	Note	%±
1890	1,977		—
1900	3,593		81.7%
1910	6,227		73.3%
1920	8,243		32.4%
1930	8,878		7.7%
1940	11,540		30.0%
1950	10,323		−10.5%
1960	9,475		−8.2%
1970	9,670		2.1%
1980	12,843		32.8%
1990	14,181		10.4%
2000	16,196		14.2%
2010	16,557		2.2%
2020	18,074		9.2%
2025 (est.)	18,846	▲	4.3%
U.S. Decennial Census; 1790–1960 1900–1990; 1990–2000 2010 2020

=== Racial and ethnic composition ===
Sawyer County, Wisconsin – Racial and ethnic composition Note: the US Census treats Hispanic/Latino as an ethnic category. This table excludes Latinos from the racial categories and assigns them to a separate category. Hispanics/Latinos may be of any race.
Race / ethnicity (NH = Non-Hispanic)	Pop 1980	Pop 1990	Pop 2000	Pop 2010	Pop 2020	% 1980	% 1990	% 2000	% 2010	% 2020
White alone (NH)	11,402	11,928	13,182	13,004	13,817	88.78%	84.11%	81.39%	78.54%	76.45%
Black or African American alone (NH)	3	18	50	76	96	0.02%	0.13%	0.31%	0.46%	0.53%
Native American or Alaska Native alone (NH)	1,392	2,118	2,562	2,669	2,861	10.84%	14.94%	15.82%	16.12%	15.83%
Asian alone (NH)	10	15	41	49	63	0.08%	0.11%	0.25%	0.30%	0.35%
Native Hawaiian or Pacific Islander alone (NH)	x	x	2	0	2	x	x	0.01%	0.00%	0.01%
Other race alone (NH)	22	1	26	2	54	0.17%	0.01%	0.16%	0.01%	0.30%
Mixed race or Multiracial (NH)	x	x	188	489	823	x	x	1.16%	2.95%	4.55%
Hispanic or Latino (any race)	14	101	145	268	358	0.11%	0.71%	0.90%	1.62%	1.98%
Total	12,843	14,181	16,196	16,557	18,074	100.00%	100.00%	100.00%	100.00%	100.00%

=== 2020 census ===
As of the 2020 census, the county had a population of 18,074. The population density was 14.4 people per square mile (5.6 people/km^{2}). There were 15,966 housing units at an average density of 12.7 units per square mile (4.9 units/km^{2}).

The median age was 52.7 years. 18.5% of residents were under the age of 18 and 28.7% of residents were 65 years of age or older. For every 100 females there were 104.3 males, and for every 100 females age 18 and over there were 103.3 males age 18 and over.

The racial makeup of the county was 77.0% White, 0.6% Black or African American, 16.3% American Indian and Alaska Native, 0.3% Asian, <0.1% Native Hawaiian and Pacific Islander, 0.6% from some other race, and 5.2% from two or more races. Hispanic or Latino residents of any race comprised 2.0% of the population.

<0.1% of residents lived in urban areas, while 100.0% lived in rural areas.

There were 8,030 households in the county, of which 21.1% had children under the age of 18 living in them. Of all households, 47.4% were married-couple households, 22.5% were households with a male householder and no spouse or partner present, and 22.4% were households with a female householder and no spouse or partner present. About 31.3% of all households were made up of individuals and 15.6% had someone living alone who was 65 years of age or older.

Of the 15,966 housing units, 49.7% were vacant. Among occupied housing units, 76.8% were owner-occupied and 23.2% were renter-occupied. The homeowner vacancy rate was 1.7% and the rental vacancy rate was 10.0%.

=== 2000 census ===
The 2000 Census Age Pyramid for Sawyer County

As of the 2000 census, 16,196 people, 6,640 households, and 4,581 families resided in the county. The population density was 13 people per square mile (5.0 people/km^{2}). The 13,722 housing units had an average density of 11 units per square mile (4.2 units/km^{2}). The racial makeup of the county was 81.72% White, 0.31% African American, 16.07% Native American, 0.30% Asian, 0.37% from other races, and 1.23% from two or more races. About 0.90% of the population were Hispanics or Latinos of any race. About 29.6% were of German, 7.8% Irish, 6.7% Norwegian, 5.9% Polish, 5.2% Swedish, and 5.2% English ancestry; 95.4% spoke English, 2.0% Ojibwa and 1.1% Spanish as their first language.

Of the 6,640 households, 27.5% had children under 18 living with them, 54.2% were married couples living together, 10.0% had a female householder with no husband present, and 31.0% were not families. About 26.2% of all households were made up of individuals, and 11.7% had someone living alone who was 65 or older. The average household size was 2.39, and the average family size was 2.86.

In the county, the age distribution was 24.1% under the age of 18, 6.0% from 18 to 24, 24.6% from 25 to 44, 27.4% from 45 to 64, and 17.9% who were 65 or older. The median age was 42 years. For every 100 females, there were 101.8 males. For every 100 females 18 and over, there were 101.0 males.

In 2017, 167 births occurred, with a general fertility rate of 74.5 births per 1000 women aged 15–44, the eighth-highest rate out of all 72 Wisconsin counties. Additionally, fewer than five induced abortions were reported as performed on women of Sawyer County residence in 2017.

== Communities ==
=== City ===
- Hayward (county seat)

=== Villages ===
- Couderay
- Exeland
- Radisson
- Winter

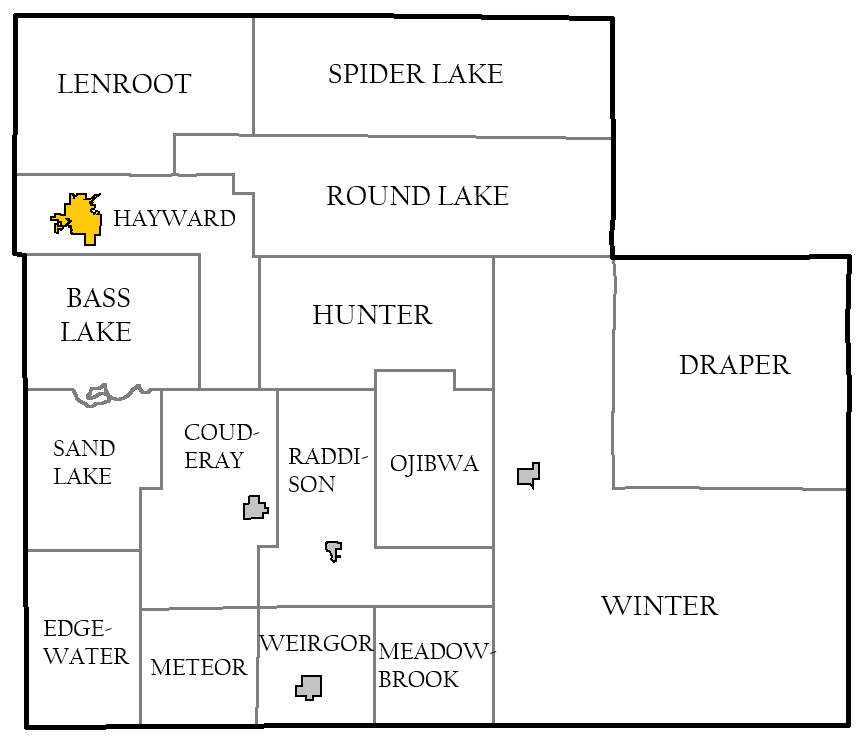
Towns of Sawyer County

=== Towns ===
- Bass Lake
- Couderay
- Draper
- Edgewater
- Hayward
- Hunter
- Lenroot
- Meadowbrook
- Meteor
- Ojibwa
- Radisson
- Round Lake
- Sand Lake
- Spider Lake
- Weirgor
- Winter

=== Census-designated places ===
- Chief Lake
- Little Round Lake
- New Post
- Reserve
- Stone Lake (partial)

=== Unincorporated communities ===
- Draper
- Edgewater
- Hauer
- Hay Stack Corner
- Lemington
- Loretta
- Meteor
- Northwoods Beach
- Ojibwa
- Oxbo
- Phipps
- Seeley
- Weirgor
- Wooddale
- Yarnell

== Politics ==
United States presidential election results for Sawyer County, Wisconsin
Year	Republican		Democratic		Third party(ies)	
Year	No.	%	No.	%	No.	%
1892	412	52.62%	328	41.89%	43	5.49%
1896	514	56.30%	369	40.42%	30	3.29%
1900	723	68.53%	305	28.91%	27	2.56%
1904	782	75.92%	205	19.90%	43	4.17%
1908	815	70.81%	299	25.98%	37	3.21%
1912	295	32.45%	432	47.52%	182	20.02%
1916	550	46.57%	562	47.59%	69	5.84%
1920	1,668	79.28%	302	14.35%	134	6.37%
1924	990	37.53%	135	5.12%	1,513	57.35%
1928	1,882	61.44%	1,129	36.86%	52	1.70%
1932	1,179	31.86%	2,381	64.35%	140	3.78%
1936	1,726	36.47%	2,834	59.88%	173	3.66%
1940	2,745	52.46%	2,439	46.61%	49	0.94%
1944	2,421	55.02%	1,947	44.25%	32	0.73%
1948	2,257	49.51%	2,177	47.75%	125	2.74%
1952	3,146	67.02%	1,527	32.53%	21	0.45%
1956	2,823	64.54%	1,520	34.75%	31	0.71%
1960	2,699	53.59%	2,325	46.17%	12	0.24%
1964	2,012	43.62%	2,591	56.17%	10	0.22%
1968	2,475	52.17%	1,830	38.58%	439	9.25%
1972	3,081	62.52%	1,765	35.82%	82	1.66%
1976	2,720	46.06%	3,055	51.74%	130	2.20%
1980	3,548	50.07%	3,065	43.25%	473	6.68%
1984	3,913	56.14%	2,982	42.78%	75	1.08%
1988	3,260	49.88%	3,231	49.43%	45	0.69%
1992	2,658	36.09%	2,796	37.96%	1,911	25.95%
1996	2,603	40.20%	2,773	42.83%	1,099	16.97%
2000	3,972	51.14%	3,333	42.91%	462	5.95%
2004	4,951	52.37%	4,411	46.66%	91	0.96%
2008	4,199	46.22%	4,765	52.45%	121	1.33%
2012	4,442	49.22%	4,486	49.71%	97	1.07%
2016	5,185	56.75%	3,503	38.34%	449	4.91%
2020	5,909	56.22%	4,498	42.80%	103	0.98%
2024	6,422	57.65%	4,599	41.28%	119	1.07%

Sawyer County had a historical reputation for being a bellwether county in presidential elections, having voted for the overall national winner in every election from 1964 to 2016. Similar to other bellwether counties, this streak was broken in 2020 when the county backed Donald Trump over eventual winner Joe Biden. This is because of increasing geographic polarization in American politics, with fewer and fewer counties swinging between parties, and instead voting consistently for one party according to demographics.

== See also ==
- National Register of Historic Places listings in Sawyer County, Wisconsin
