= Meadow Brook Club =

Meadow Brook Club may refer to:

- Meadow Brook Golf Club, a private golf club in Jericho, Long Island, New York
- Meadowbrook Polo Club, the oldest continuously operating polo club in the United States

== See also ==
- Meadowbrook Country Club (disambiguation)
