= Couderay, Wisconsin =

- Village
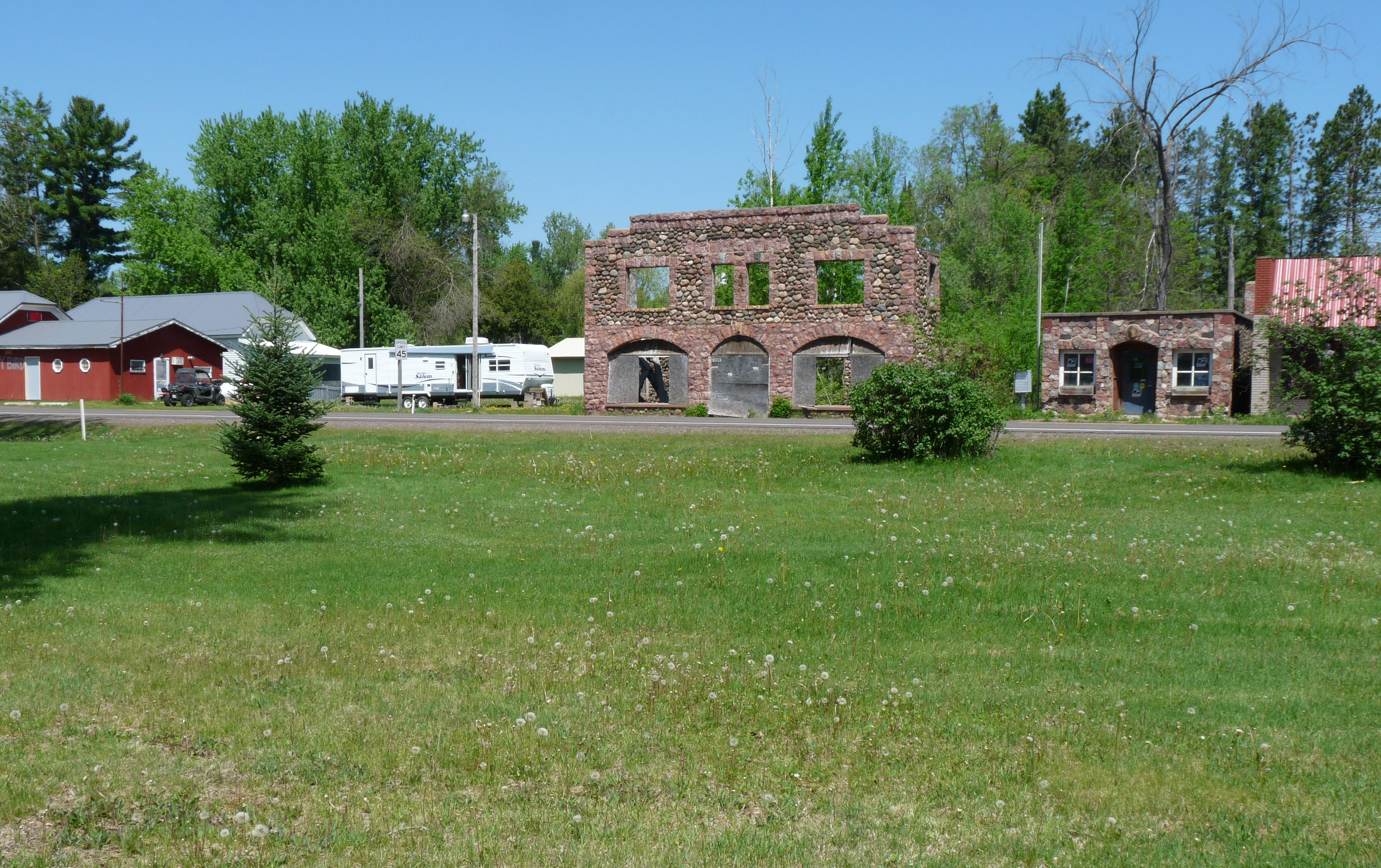
- The old center of Couderay, with remains of the Keystone Bar at center

- Location of Couderay in Sawyer County, Wisconsin.
- Coordinates: 45°49′22″N 91°20′50″W
- Country: United States
- State: Wisconsin
- County: Sawyer

Area
  - Total: 0.99 sq mi (2.57 km^{2})
  - Land: 0.97 sq mi (2.51 km^{2})
  - Water: 0.023 sq mi (0.06 km^{2})
- Elevation: 1,329 ft (405 m)

Population (2020)
  - Total: 81
  - Density: 84/sq mi (32/km^{2})
- Time zone: UTC-6 (Central (CST))
  - Summer (DST): UTC-5 (CDT)
- Area codes: 715 & 534
- FIPS code: 55-17250
- GNIS feature ID: 1583020

Couderay is a village in Sawyer County, Wisconsin, United States, along the Couderay River. The population was 81 at the 2020 census. The village is located within the Town of Couderay.

== History ==
The name Couderay is a truncated name of French origin denoting the term "short ears" (courtes oreilles) in connection with those of the Ojibwa people. French explorers and French-Canadian trappers who roamed the northern part of French Louisiana and the Great Lakes at the time of New France created this name.

Logging of the pine along the Couderay River and its tributaries began in the 1800s. In those early years, logs were driven down the river to the Chippewa, and eventually to Chippewa Falls, Eau Claire, and beyond to be sawed. In 1902 Levi Felton and P.M. Parker built a sawmill on Eddy Creek, on the east side of what would become Couderay. The following year the Omaha Railroad built its track through Couderay, providing a means to haul the sawed lumber to markets.

A little mill-town grew up around the depot and mills. In boom years the mills employed 150, and the town had general stores, billiard and soft drink halls, a restaurant, a barber, a potato warehouse, a four-room two-story primary school, a Presbyterian church and a Catholic church.

In the 1920s and 1930s Chicago gangster Al Capone had a home on a private lake five miles north of Couderay - now a tourist site called "The Hideout." The Hideout was purchased in the spring of 2010 by the Lac Courte Oreilles Indian Tribe after bankruptcy hearings for the previous owners.

The mills have long since closed, many people moved out, and the railroad line was finally abandoned in 1965, then converted to the Tuscobia State Trail. It now runs through town parallel to highway 27/70, with tourists occasionally stopping.

== Geography ==
According to the United States Census Bureau, the village has a total area of 0.98 square miles (2.54 km^{2}), of which 0.96 square miles (2.49 km^{2}) is land and 0.02 square miles (0.05 km^{2}) is water.

=== Weather ===
On February 2, and February 4, 1996, the temperature fell to −55 °F (−48 °C), the coldest temperature ever recorded in Wisconsin.

Climate data for Couderay 7 W, Wisconsin, 1991–2020 normals, 1951-2020 extremes: 1300ft (396m)
Month	Jan	Feb	Mar	Apr	May	Jun	Jul	Aug	Sep	Oct	Nov	Dec	Year
Record high °F (°C)	54 (12)	59 (15)	75 (24)	89 (32)	92 (33)	98 (37)	102 (39)	100 (38)	95 (35)	87 (31)	73 (23)	61 (16)	102 (39)
Mean maximum °F (°C)	39.3 (4.1)	44.0 (6.7)	57.7 (14.3)	74.8 (23.8)	82.5 (28.1)	87.1 (30.6)	87.8 (31.0)	86.7 (30.4)	82.5 (28.1)	74.3 (23.5)	57.5 (14.2)	42.9 (6.1)	90.4 (32.4)
Mean daily maximum °F (°C)	21.7 (−5.7)	26.9 (−2.8)	39.3 (4.1)	52.8 (11.6)	67.0 (19.4)	75.0 (23.9)	79.2 (26.2)	76.7 (24.8)	69.0 (20.6)	55.3 (12.9)	39.4 (4.1)	26.8 (−2.9)	52.4 (11.4)
Daily mean °F (°C)	11.9 (−11.2)	15.7 (−9.1)	28.3 (−2.1)	41.1 (5.1)	53.5 (11.9)	63.0 (17.2)	67.2 (19.6)	64.9 (18.3)	57.2 (14.0)	44.6 (7.0)	30.8 (−0.7)	18.6 (−7.4)	41.4 (5.2)
Mean daily minimum °F (°C)	2.1 (−16.6)	4.4 (−15.3)	17.4 (−8.1)	29.3 (−1.5)	40.0 (4.4)	50.9 (10.5)	55.1 (12.8)	53.0 (11.7)	45.5 (7.5)	33.8 (1.0)	22.3 (−5.4)	10.4 (−12.0)	30.4 (−0.9)
Mean minimum °F (°C)	−29.0 (−33.9)	−26.8 (−32.7)	−14.5 (−25.8)	10.3 (−12.1)	21.6 (−5.8)	31.7 (−0.2)	40.0 (4.4)	36.8 (2.7)	25.2 (−3.8)	15.4 (−9.2)	0.0 (−17.8)	−20.2 (−29.0)	−32.7 (−35.9)
Record low °F (°C)	−50 (−46)	−55 (−48)	−48 (−44)	−8 (−22)	6 (−14)	20 (−7)	30 (−1)	20 (−7)	16 (−9)	2 (−17)	−32 (−36)	−52 (−47)	−55 (−48)
Average precipitation inches (mm)	1.30 (33)	1.48 (38)	2.24 (57)	3.52 (89)	4.62 (117)	5.30 (135)	5.11 (130)	4.51 (115)	4.29 (109)	3.77 (96)	2.26 (57)	1.89 (48)	40.29 (1,024)
Average snowfall inches (cm)	11.30 (28.7)	15.60 (39.6)	12.20 (31.0)	6.00 (15.2)	0.10 (0.25)	0.00 (0.00)	0.00 (0.00)	0.00 (0.00)	0.00 (0.00)	1.30 (3.3)	6.50 (16.5)	14.20 (36.1)	67.2 (170.65)
Source 1: NOAA
Source 2: XMACIS (records & monthly max/mins)

== Demographics ==
Historical population
Census	Pop.	Note	%±
1930	171		—
1940	189		10.5%
1950	133		−29.6%
1960	113		−15.0%
1970	123		8.8%
1980	114		−7.3%
1990	92		−19.3%
2000	96		4.3%
2010	88		−8.3%
2020	81		−8.0%
U.S. Decennial Census

=== 2010 census ===
As of the census of 2010, there were 88 people, 35 households, and 20 families living in the village. The population density was 91.7 inhabitants per square mile (35.4/km^{2}). There were 51 housing units at an average density of 53.1 per square mile (20.5/km^{2}). The racial makeup of the village was 73.9% White, 12.5% Native American, 1.1% from other races, and 12.5% from two or more races. Hispanic or Latino of any race were 1.1% of the population.

There were 35 households, of which 20.0% had children under the age of 18 living with them, 57.1% were married couples living together, and 42.9% were non-families. 28.6% of all households were made up of individuals, and 14.3% had someone living alone who was 65 years of age or older. The average household size was 2.29 and the average family size was 2.80.

The median age in the village was 45.5 years. 15.9% of residents were under the age of 18; 4.5% were between the ages of 18 and 24; 28.4% were from 25 to 44; 34.2% were from 45 to 64; and 17% were 65 years of age or older. The gender makeup of the village was 55.7% male and 44.3% female.

=== 2000 census ===
As of the census of 2000, there were 96 people, 40 households, and 26 families living in the village. The population density was 99.2 people per square mile (38.2/km^{2}). There were 54 housing units at an average density of 55.8 per square mile (21.5/km^{2}). The racial makeup of the village was 79.17% White, 19.79% Native American, 1.04% from other races. 1.04% of the population were Hispanic or Latino of any race.

There were 40 households, out of which 30.0% had children under the age of 18 living with them, 55.0% were married couples living together, 5.0% had a female householder with no husband present, and 35.0% were non-families. 27.5% of all households were made up of individuals, and 15.0% had someone living alone who was 65 years of age or older. The average household size was 2.40 and the average family size was 2.88.

In the village, the population was spread out, with 21.9% under the age of 18, 11.5% from 18 to 24, 20.8% from 25 to 44, 28.1% from 45 to 64, and 17.7% who were 65 years of age or older. The median age was 41 years. For every 100 females, there were 128.6 males. For every 100 females age 18 and over, there were 120.6 males.

The median income for a household in the village was $40,417, and the median income for a family was $41,042. Males had a median income of $33,750 versus $9,750 for females. The per capita income for the village was $14,008. There were 6.1% of families and 11.4% of the population living below the poverty line, including no under eighteens and 41.2% of those over 64.
