= Meadow Brook =

Meadow Brook may refer to:

== Places ==
- Meadow Brook, New Brunswick, Canada

=== United States ===
- Meadow Brook, Minnesota, in St. Louis County
- Meadow Brook Hall, Rochester Hills, Michigan, the former Estate of Matilda Dodge Wilson
- Meadow Brook Music Festival, Rochester Hills, Michigan
- Meadow Brook Township, Cass County, Minnesota

== Waterways ==
- Meadow Brook (Lackawanna River tributary), a stream in Lackawanna County, Pennsylvania
- Meadow Brook (Missouri), a stream in Knox County, Missouri

== See also ==
- Meadowbrook (disambiguation)
