= Wisconsin Highway 40 =

State highway in Wisconsin, United States

State Trunk Highway 40
- WIS 40 highlighted in red

Route information
- Maintained by WisDOT
- Length: 81.56 mi (131.26 km)

Major junctions
- South end: US 12 / WIS 29 in Elk Mound
- US 53 in Bloomer; US 8 in Bruce
- North end: WIS 27 / WIS 70 in Radisson

Location
- Country: United States
- State: Wisconsin
- Counties: Dunn, Chippewa, Rusk, Sawyer

Highway system
- Wisconsin State Trunk Highway System; Interstate; US; State; Scenic; Rustic
← WIS 39	→ I-41

State Trunk Highway 40 (often called Highway 40, STH-40 or WIS 40) is a state highway in the U.S. state of Wisconsin. It runs in north–south in northwest Wisconsin from near Elk Mound to Radisson, passing through Sawyer, Rusk, Chippewa, and Dunn counties. The largest town on its route is Bloomer.

== Route description ==
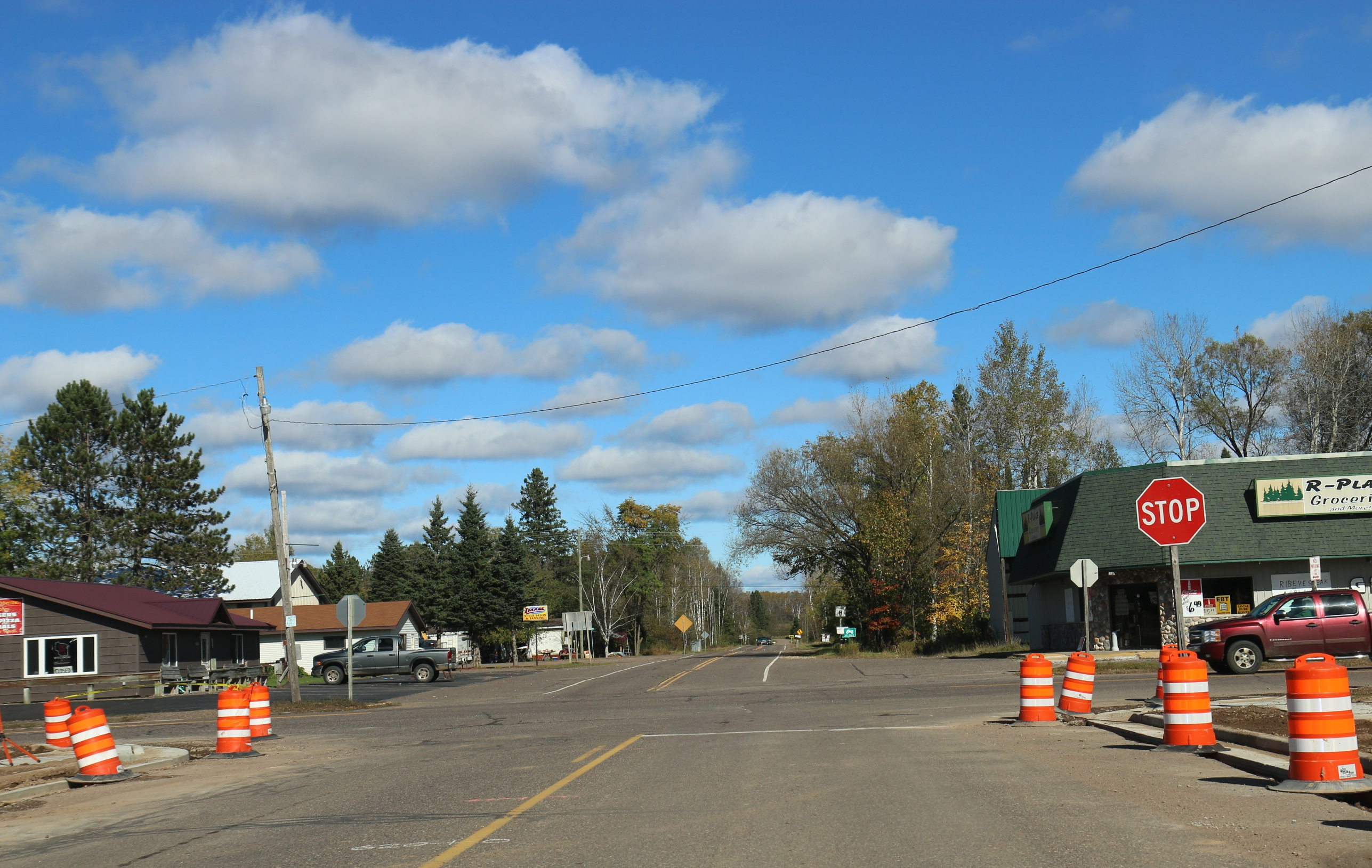
The northern terminus of WIS40 in Radisson at WIS 27/WIS 70

WIS 40 starts at an interchange with WIS 29. US Highway 12 (US 12) continues southeasterly from the interchange and runs along WIS 29 west of it. WIS 40 runs north of said interchange until reaching Colfax, where it meets WIS 170. The highway runs northeasterly from Coifax, passing through an interchange with US 53 just before running through the city of Bloomer. The highway meets County Trunk Highway F (CTH-F), CTH-Q, and CTH-SS within Bloomer and runs concurrently with WIS 64 along the boundary between the towns of Woodmohr and Bloomer, just north of the city of Bloomer. The concurrency runs east for approximately two miles (3.2 km) before the highway runs north from it.

Shortly after passing through the community of Island Lake, the highway runs along or near the Chippewa River. South of the village of Bruce, the highway follows a short westward concurrency with US 8. After leaving the concurrency, the highway runs northeastward to meet the Chippewa River. The highway runs along the river until shortly after it meets CTH-H north of the Imalone community. The highway runs north, passing through an intersection with WIS 48 and then meets the Chippewa River again. After the Couderay River splits from the Chippewa River, the highway follows it until it reaches Radisson, at which point the highway runs across it and terminates at WIS 70.

== Major intersections ==
County	Location	mi	km	Destinations	Notes
Dunn	Town of Elk Mound	0.0	0.0	US 12 / WIS 29 – Menomonie, Elk Mound, Chippewa Falls	Interchange; access to I-94
Dunn	Colfax	8.4	13.5	WIS 170 west – Wheeler	
Chippewa	Bloomer	24.7	39.8	US 53 – Superior, Eau Claire	Interchange
Chippewa	Woodmohr–Bloomer line	26.8	43.1	WIS 64 west – New Richmond	Western end of WIS 64 concurrency
Chippewa	Woodmohr–Bloomer line	28.7	46.2	WIS 64 east – Cornell	Eastern end of WIS 64 concurrency
Rusk	Bruce	56.9	91.6	US 8 east – Ladysmith	Eastern end of US 8 concurrency
Rusk	Bruce	57.5	92.5	US 8 west – Cameron	Western end of US 8 concurrency
Sawyer	Weirgor	73.5	118.3	WIS 48 west – Exeland, Birchwood	
Sawyer	Radisson	81.4	131.0	WIS 27 / WIS 70 – Hayward, Spooner, Fifield	
1.000 mi = 1.609 km; 1.000 km = 0.621 mi: Concurrency terminus

== Business route ==
Business State Trunk Highway 40
- Location: Bruce
- Length: 0.8 mi (1,300 m)
- Existed: c. 1999–

Business State Trunk Highway 40 (Bus. WIS 40) in Bruce follows the former alignment of WIS 40, after the highway was realigned in 1999.
