= Round Lake, Wisconsin =

- Town
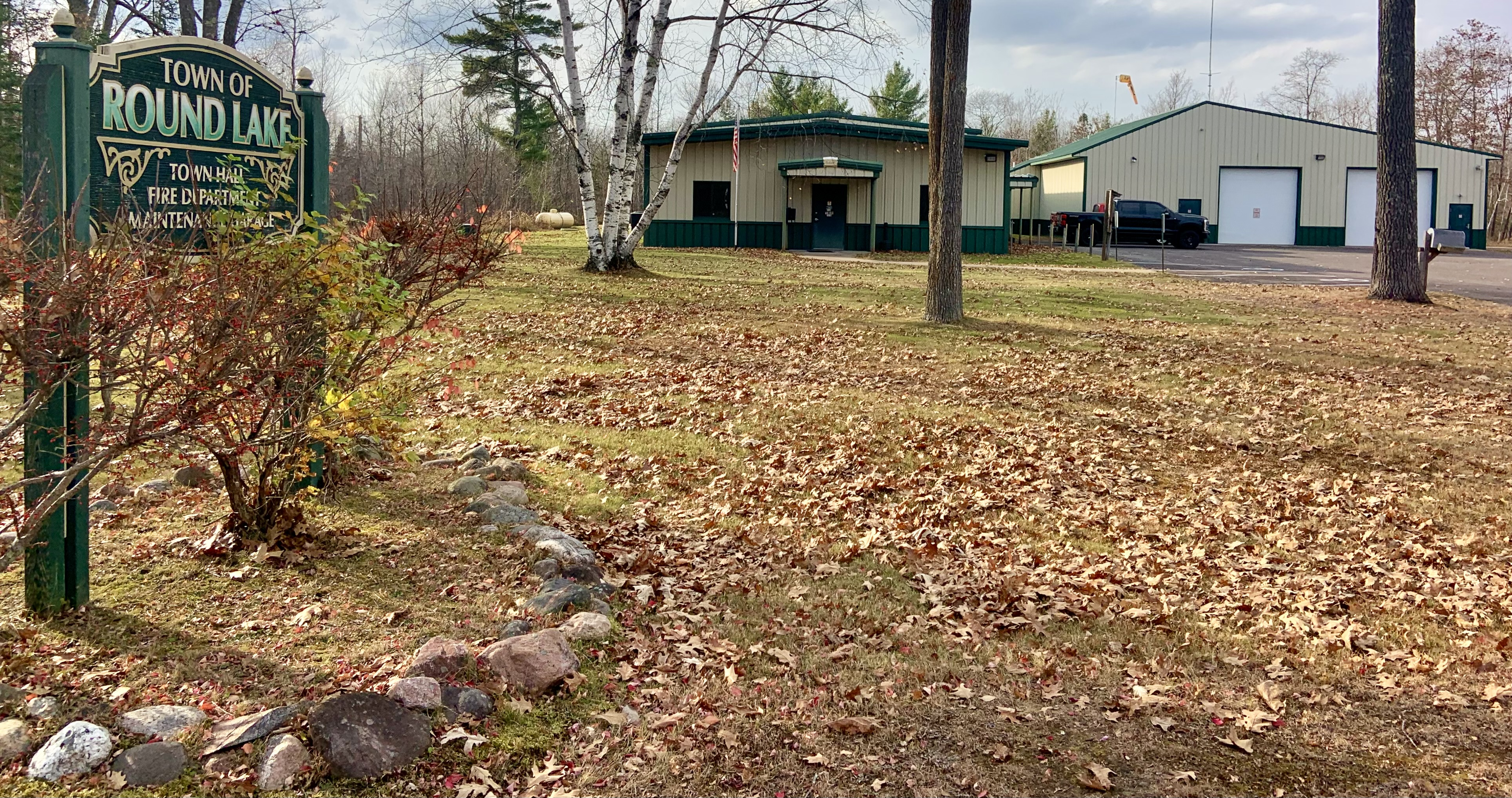
- Town hall

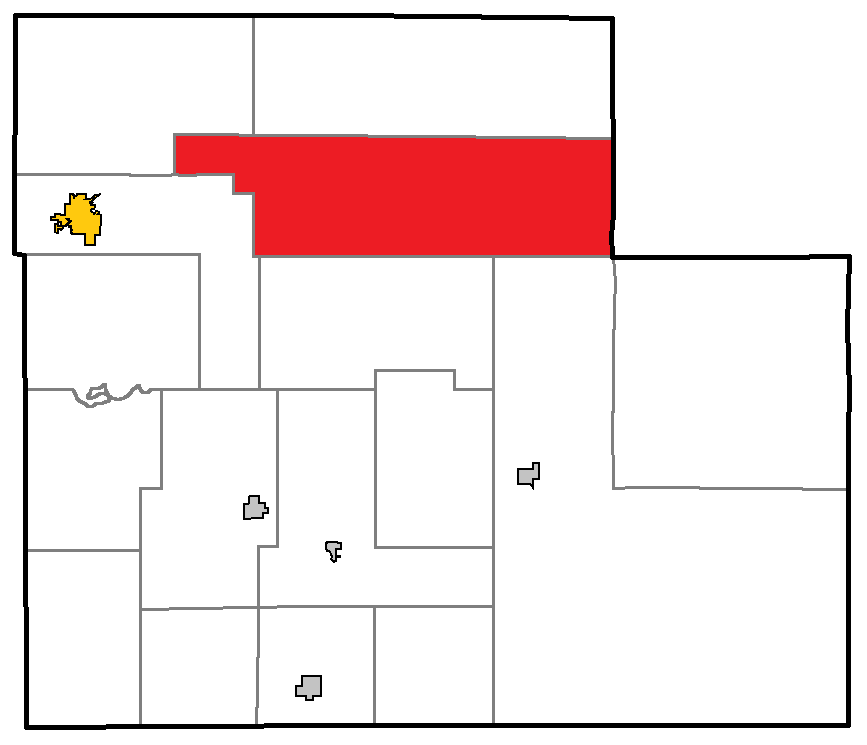
- Location of Round Lake, within Sawyer County
- Coordinates: 46°1′35″N 91°11′15″W
- Country: United States
- State: Wisconsin
- County: Sawyer

Area
  - Total: 118.1 sq mi (306.0 km^{2})
  - Land: 109.3 sq mi (283.0 km^{2})
  - Water: 8.9 sq mi (23.0 km^{2})
- Elevation: 1,401 ft (427 m)

Population (2020)
  - Total: 1,081
  - Density: 9.893/sq mi (3.820/km^{2})
- Time zone: UTC-6 (Central (CST))
  - Summer (DST): UTC-5 (CDT)
- Area codes: 715 & 534
- FIPS code: 55-69750
- GNIS feature ID: 1584069
- Website: http://townofroundlakewi.org/

Round Lake is a town in Sawyer County, Wisconsin, United States. The population was 1,081 at the 2020 census.

== Geography ==
According to the United States Census Bureau, the town has a total area of 118.2 square miles (306.0 km^{2}), of which 109.3 square miles (283.0 km^{2}) is land and 8.9 square mile (23.0 km^{2}) (7.52%) is water.

The 3,294-acre Round Lake is located in the town. The lake has a maximum depth of 74 feet and is home to an abundance of different fish including largemouth bass, smallmouth sass, walleye, panfish, musky and Northern pike. Only three properties on the lake still have separate guest houses, which were banned from being built in the 1970s.

== Demographics ==
As of the census of 2000, there were 962 people, 431 households, and 299 families residing in the town. The population density was 8.8 people per square mile (3.4/km^{2}). There were 1,113 housing units at an average density of 10.2 per square mile (3.9/km^{2}). The racial makeup of the town was 98.34% White, 0.10% African American, 0.31% Native American, 0.21% Asian, 0.73% from other races, and 0.31% from two or more races. Hispanic or Latino of any race were 0.42% of the population.

There were 431 households, out of which 20.6% had children under the age of 18 living with them, 63.8% were married couples living together, 2.1% had a female householder with no husband present, and 30.6% were non-families. 26.2% of all households were made up of individuals, and 10.9% had someone living alone who was 65 years of age or older. The average household size was 2.23 and the average family size was 2.68.

In the town, the population was spread out, with 19.4% under the age of 18, 3.3% from 18 to 24, 22.2% from 25 to 44, 37.2% from 45 to 64, and 17.8% who were 65 years of age or older. The median age was 48 years. For every 100 females, there were 111.4 males. For every 100 females age 18 and over, there were 108.9 males.

The median income for a household in the town was $40,179, and the median income for a family was $51,071. Males had a median income of $35,000 versus $21,875 for females. The per capita income for the town was $24,951. About 4.2% of families and 6.7% of the population were below the poverty line, including 9.9% of those under age 18 and 1.2% of those age 65 or over.
