= Winter (town), Wisconsin =

Winter, Wisconsin
- Town
- Town of Winter
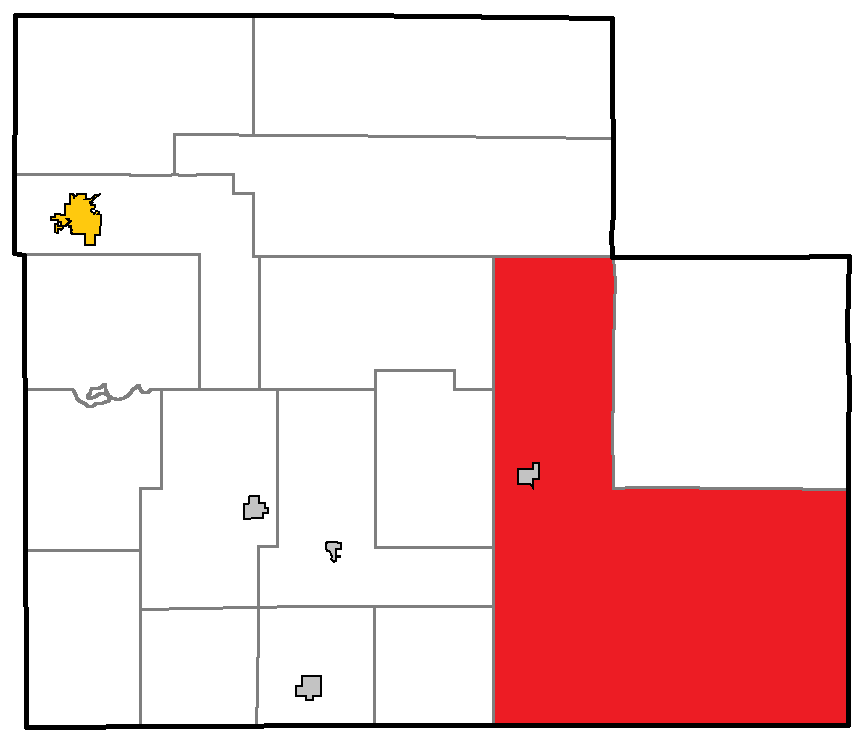
- Location of Winter, within Sawyer County
- Coordinates: 45.819633°N 91.012094°W
- Country: United States
- State: Wisconsin
- County: Sawyer

Area
  - Total: 285.07 sq mi (738.3 km^{2})
  - Land: 279.68 sq mi (724.4 km^{2})
  - Water: 5.38 sq mi (13.9 km^{2})

Population (2020)
  - Total: 1,000
  - Density: 3.6/sq mi (1.4/km^{2})
- Time zone: UTC-6 (Central (CST))
  - Summer (DST): UTC-5 (CDT)
- Area code(s): 715 & 534
- GNIS feature ID: 1584460

Winter is a town in Sawyer County, Wisconsin, United States. The population was 1,000 at the 2020 census. The Village of Winter is located within the town, but is not a part of it. The unincorporated community of Hay Stack Corner is also located in the town. The town claims to be the largest town in Wisconsin and the United States.

== Geography ==
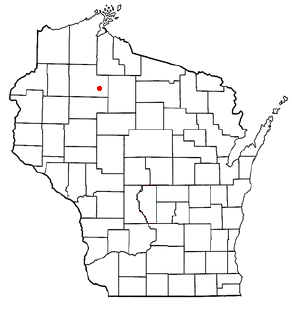
Location of Winter (town), Wisconsin

According to the United States Census Bureau, the town has a total area of 285.3 square miles (738.9 km^{2}), of which 279.5 square miles (723.9 km^{2}) is land and 5.8 square miles (15.0 km^{2} or 2.03%) is water.

== Demographics ==
As of the census of 2000, there were 969 people, 381 households, and 276 families residing in the town. The population density was 3.5 people per square mile (1.3/km^{2}). There were 1,203 housing units at an average density of 4.3 per square mile (1.7/km^{2}). The racial makeup of the town was 94.22% White, 3.82% Black or African American, 1.14% Native American, 0.52% Asian, 0.21% from other races, and 0.10% from two or more races. 1.55% of the population were Hispanic or Latino of any race.

There were 381 households, out of which 23.4% had children under the age of 18 living with them, 63.0% were married couples living together, 5.2% had a female householder with no husband present, and 27.3% were non-families. 22.3% of all households were made up of individuals, and 10.2% had someone living alone who was 65 years of age or older. The average household size was 2.34 and the average family size was 2.72.

In the town, the population was spread out, with 17.9% under the age of 18, 6.4% from 18 to 24, 25.3% from 25 to 44, 31.4% from 45 to 64, and 19.1% who were 65 years of age or older. The median age was 45 years. For every 100 females, there were 118.7 males. For every 100 females age 18 and over, there were 123.0 males.

The median income for a household in the town was $33,500, and the median income for a family was $41,125. Males had a median income of $31,442 versus $22,614 for females. The per capita income for the town was $19,033. About 10.2% of families and 12.7% of the population were below the poverty line, including 12.8% of those under age 18 and 12.6% of those age 65 or over.
