= Couderay River =

River in northwest Wisconsin, United States

Coordinates: 45°44′20″N 91°13′02″W

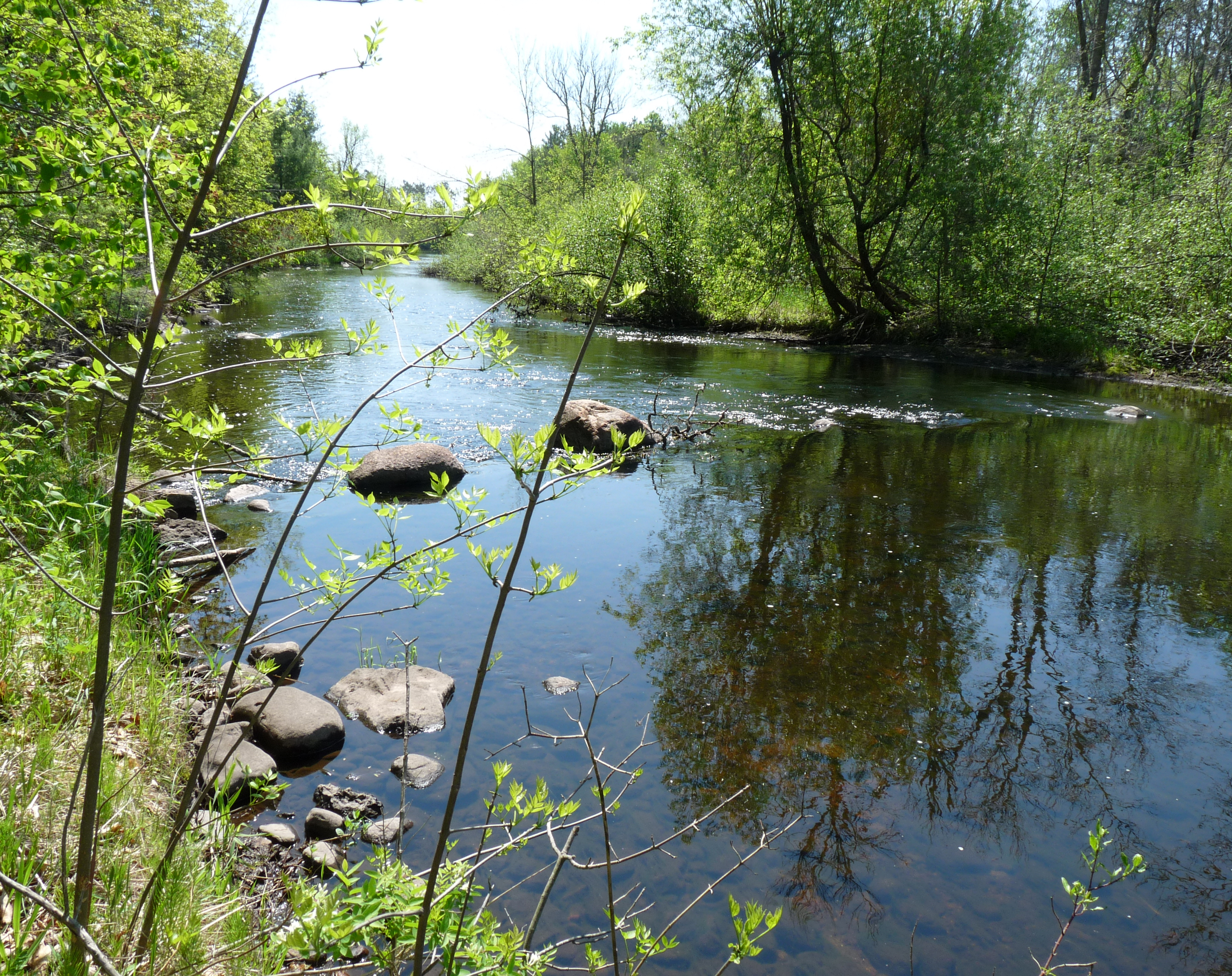
West of the village of Couderay, looking east

The Couderay River is a tributary of the Chippewa River in northwestern Wisconsin in the United States. Sturgeon and bass are caught in the river, and stretches are Class 1 trout stream. The name "Couderay" is derived from the French "Rivière des Courte Oreilles" (River of the "Short Ears").

== Course ==
The Couderay River flows from Lac Courte Oreilles and passes through Little Lac Courte Oreilles and the Billy Boy Flowage. It flows generally east-southeastwardly, through the Lac Courte Oreilles Indian Reservation and past the communities of Reserve, Couderay and Radisson - flowing entirely within Sawyer County. Via the Chippewa River, the Couderay is part of the Mississippi River watershed.

The Grimh Flowage was a reservoir formed by a North Central Power Company hydro dam on the Couderay just south of Radisson. Rather than rehabilitate the dam, NCPC decided to remove it, which Ayres Associates completed in 2012, restoring that part of the river to a somewhat normal state.

== See also ==
- List of Wisconsin rivers
- See Logging on the Chippewa for an overview of 19th century logging in the Chippewa watershed.
