= Meadowbrook Country Club (disambiguation) =

Meadowbrook Country Club is a country club in Northville Township, Wayne County, Michigan.

Meadowbrook Country Club may also refer to:

- Meadow Brook Golf Club, Jericho, New York
- Meadowbrook Country Club (Garner, North Carolina)
- Meadowbrook Country Club (Chesterfield County, Virginia)

== See also ==
- Meadow Brook (disambiguation)
- Meadowbrook (disambiguation)
