= Meteor, Wisconsin =

- Town
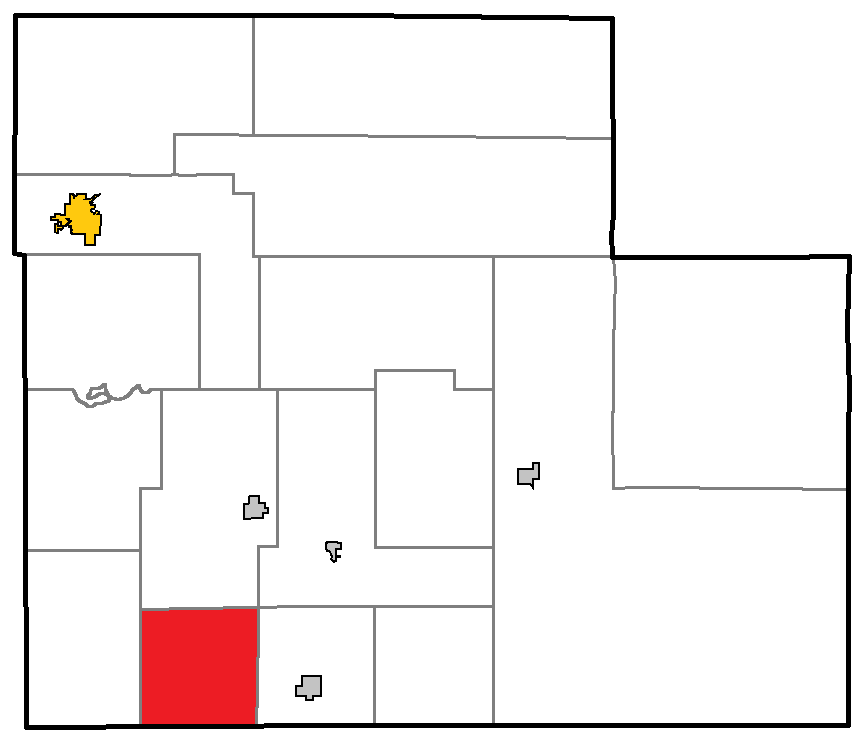
- Location of Meteor, within Sawyer County
- Coordinates: 45°40′45″N 91°21′2″W
- Country: United States
- State: Wisconsin
- County: Sawyer

Area
  - Total: 35.3 sq mi (91.3 km^{2})
  - Land: 34.4 sq mi (89.2 km^{2})
  - Water: 0.81 sq mi (2.1 km^{2})
- Elevation: 1,710 ft (520 m)

Population (2020)
  - Total: 156
  - Density: 4.53/sq mi (1.75/km^{2})
- Time zone: UTC-6 (Central (CST))
  - Summer (DST): UTC-5 (CDT)
- Area codes: 715 & 534
- FIPS code: 55-51425
- GNIS feature ID: 1583708
- Website: https://www.townofmeteor.com/

Meteor is a town in Sawyer County, Wisconsin, United States. The population was 156 at the 2020 census.

== Geography ==
According to the United States Census Bureau, the town has a total area of 35.2 square miles (91.3 km^{2}), of which 34.4 square miles (89.2 km^{2}) is land and 0.8 square mile (2.1 km^{2}) (2.33%) is water.

== Demographics ==
As of the census of 2000, there were 170 people, 62 households, and 44 families residing in the town. The population density was 4.9 people per square mile (1.9/km^{2}). There were 128 housing units at an average density of 3.7 per square mile (1.4/km^{2}). The racial makeup of the town was 95.88% White, 1.76% Native American, 0.59% from other races, and 1.76% from two or more races. Hispanic or Latino of any race were 0.59% of the population.

There were 62 households, out of which 33.9% had children under the age of 18 living with them, 66.1% were married couples living together, and 29.0% were non-families. 25.8% of all households were made up of individuals, and 8.1% had someone living alone who was 65 years of age or older. The average household size was 2.74 and the average family size was 3.32.

In the town, the population was spread out, with 32.9% under the age of 18, 2.4% from 18 to 24, 27.6% from 25 to 44, 26.5% from 45 to 64, and 10.6% who were 65 years of age or older. The median age was 38 years. For every 100 females, there were 120.8 males. For every 100 females age 18 and over, there were 147.8 males.

The median income for a household in the town was $30,625, and the median income for a family was $49,375. Males had a median income of $30,139 versus $30,750 for females. The per capita income for the town was $12,487. None of the families and 7.8% of the population were living below the poverty line.
