= Meadowbrook, Wisconsin =

- Town
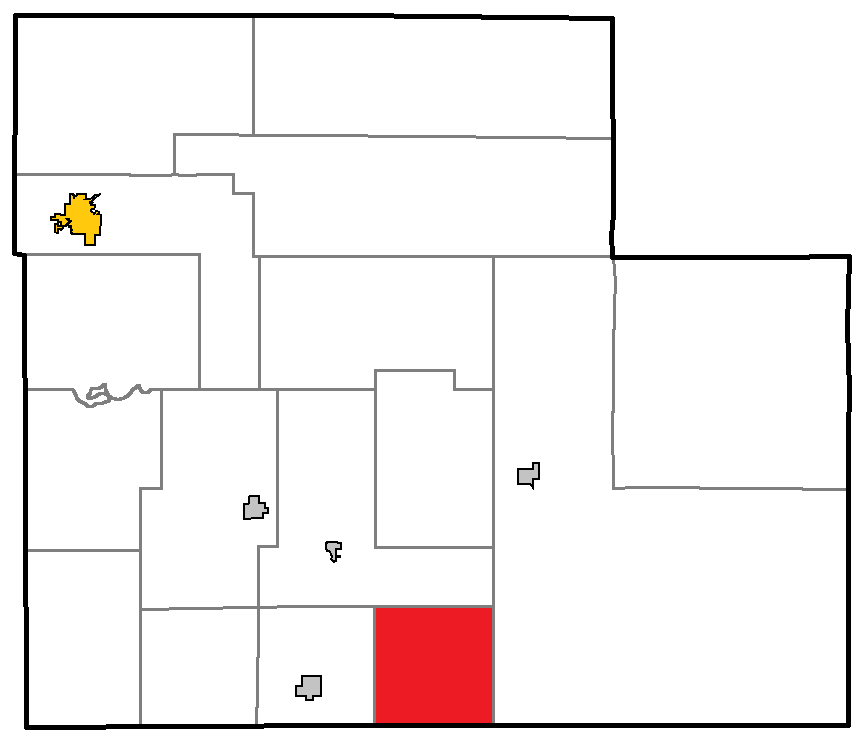
- Location of Meadowbrook, within Sawyer County
- Coordinates: 45°41′23″N 91°7′57″W
- Country: United States
- State: Wisconsin
- County: Sawyer

Area
  - Total: 36.2 sq mi (93.8 km^{2})
  - Land: 35.9 sq mi (93.1 km^{2})
  - Water: 0.27 sq mi (0.7 km^{2})
- Elevation: 1,260 ft (384 m)

Population (2020)
  - Total: 134
  - Density: 3.73/sq mi (1.44/km^{2})
- Time zone: UTC-6 (Central (CST))
  - Summer (DST): UTC-5 (CDT)
- Area codes: 715 & 534
- FIPS code: 55-50300
- GNIS feature ID: 1583680

Meadowbrook is a town in Sawyer County, Wisconsin, United States. The population was 134 at the 2020 census.

== Geography ==
According to the United States Census Bureau, the town has a total area of 36.2 square miles (93.8 km^{2}), of which 36.0 square miles (93.1 km^{2}) is land and 0.3 square mile (0.7 km^{2}) (0.75%) is water.

== Demographics ==
As of the census of 2000, there were 146 people, 60 households, and 45 families residing in the town. The population density was 4.1 people per square mile (1.6/km^{2}). There were 102 housing units at an average density of 2.8 per square mile (1.1/km^{2}). The racial makeup of the town was 91.10% White, 1.37% African American, 2.74% Native American, 2.74% from other races, and 2.05% from two or more races. Hispanic or Latino of any race were 2.74% of the population.

There were 60 households, out of which 21.7% had children under the age of 18 living with them, 65.0% were married couples living together, 6.7% had a female householder with no husband present, and 25.0% were non-families. 20.0% of all households were made up of individuals, and 6.7% had someone living alone who was 65 years of age or older. The average household size was 2.43 and the average family size was 2.82.

In the town, the population was spread out, with 20.5% under the age of 18, 8.9% from 18 to 24, 28.1% from 25 to 44, 30.1% from 45 to 64, and 12.3% who were 65 years of age or older. The median age was 42 years. For every 100 females, there were 100.0 males. For every 100 females age 18 and over, there were 114.8 males.

The median income for a household in the town was $29,167, and the median income for a family was $41,667. Males had a median income of $32,083 versus $17,344 for females. The per capita income for the town was $19,208. There were none of the families and 2.3% of the population living below the poverty line, including no under eighteens and 10.7% of those over 64.
