= Meadowbrook High School =

Meadowbrook High School may refer to:

- Meadowbrook High School (Byesville, Ohio)
- Meadowbrook High School (North Chesterfield, Virginia)
- Meadowbrook High School, Jamaica
