= Meadow Brook (Missouri) =

Stream in the American state of Missouri

Coordinates: 40.2853135°N 92.3229652°W

Meadow Brook is a stream in Knox County in the U.S. state of Missouri.

Meadow Brook was descriptively named.

== See also ==
- List of rivers of Missouri
