= Exeland, Wisconsin =

- Village
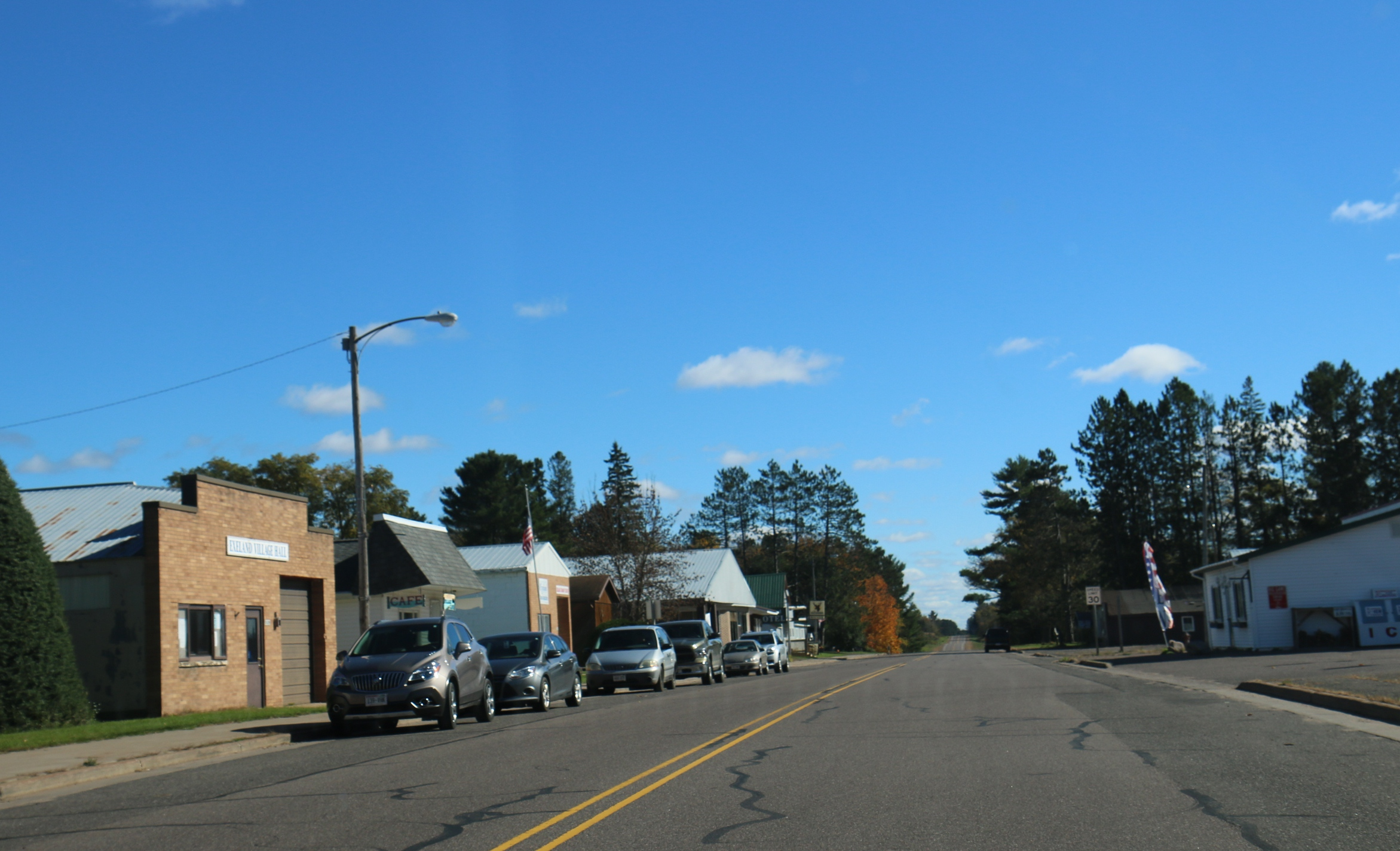
- Downtown on WIS48

- Location of Exeland in Sawyer County, Wisconsin.
- Coordinates: 45°40′7″N 91°14′35″W
- Country: United States
- State: Wisconsin
- County: Sawyer

Area
  - Total: 1.22 sq mi (3.17 km^{2})
  - Land: 1.20 sq mi (3.11 km^{2})
  - Water: 0.023 sq mi (0.06 km^{2})
- Elevation: 1,198 ft (365 m)

Population (2020)
  - Total: 229
  - Density: 190.7/sq mi (73.63/km^{2})
- Time zone: UTC-6 (Central (CST))
  - Summer (DST): UTC-5 (CDT)
- Postal code: 54835
- Area codes: 715 & 534
- FIPS code: 55-24700
- GNIS feature ID: 1564783
- Website: https://villageofexeland.gov/

Exeland is a village in Sawyer County, Wisconsin, United States. The population was 229 at the 2020 census.

== History ==
The only community named Exeland in the United States, the community was founded around 1907 when the Arpin Lumber Company built a logging railroad to the area, which crossed the Wisconsin Central Railroad. The resulting "X" led to the community's name. Exeland became a village in 1920.

A promotional document of the Wisconsin Colonization Company describes Exeland around 1920: "Today Exeland has a modern creamery, large potato warehouse, a pickle station, three fine large general stores, a feed store, a butcher shop, and a bank with $130,000 total assets."

== Geography ==
Exeland is located at 45°40′7″N 91°14′35″W (45.668632, -91.243177).

According to the United States Census Bureau, the village has a total area of 1.12 square miles (2.90 km^{2}), of which 1.11 square miles (2.87 km^{2}) is land and 0.01 square miles (0.03 km^{2}) is water.

== Demographics ==
Historical population
Census	Pop.	Note	%±
1920	211		—
1930	196		−7.1%
1940	194		−1.0%
1950	211		8.8%
1960	214		1.4%
1970	189		−11.7%
1980	219		15.9%
1990	180		−17.8%
2000	212		17.8%
2010	196		−7.5%
2020	229		16.8%
U.S. Decennial Census

=== 2010 census ===
As of the census of 2010, there were 196 people, 82 households, and 51 families living in the village. The population density was 176.6 inhabitants per square mile (68.2/km^{2}). There were 111 housing units at an average density of 100.0 per square mile (38.6/km^{2}). The racial makeup of the village was 90.3% White, 0.5% African American, 1.0% Native American, 0.5% Asian, 1.0% from other races, and 6.6% from two or more races. Hispanic or Latino of any race were 1.0% of the population.

There were 82 households, of which 28.0% had children under the age of 18 living with them, 51.2% were married couples living together, 6.1% had a female householder with no husband present, 4.9% had a male householder with no wife present, and 37.8% were non-families. 26.8% of all households were made up of individuals, and 13.5% had someone living alone who was 65 years of age or older. The average household size was 2.39 and the average family size was 2.90.

The median age in the village was 45 years. 24% of residents were under the age of 18; 2.6% were between the ages of 18 and 24; 23.5% were from 25 to 44; 31.3% were from 45 to 64; and 18.9% were 65 years of age or older. The gender makeup of the village was 50.5% male and 49.5% female.

=== 2000 census ===
As of the census of 2000, there were 212 people, 92 households, and 63 families living in the village. The population density was 190.7 people per square mile (73.7/km^{2}). There were 110 housing units at an average density of 99.0 per square mile (38.3/km^{2}). The racial makeup of the village was 87.74% White, 3.77% Native American, 1.42% from other races, and 7.08% from two or more races. Hispanic or Latino of any race were 1.42% of the population.

There were 92 households, out of which 23.9% had children under the age of 18 living with them, 46.7% were married couples living together, 13.0% had a female householder with no husband present, and 31.5% were non-families. 28.3% of all households were made up of individuals, and 15.2% had someone living alone who was 65 years of age or older. The average household size was 2.30 and the average family size was 2.81.

In the village, the population was spread out, with 24.1% under the age of 18, 6.1% from 18 to 24, 20.8% from 25 to 44, 27.4% from 45 to 64, and 21.7% who were 65 years of age or older. The median age was 44 years. For every 100 females, there were 92.7 males. For every 100 females age 18 and over, there were 83.0 males.

The median income for a household in the village was $21,000, and the median income for a family was $31,071. Males had a median income of $28,542 versus $20,500 for females. The per capita income for the village was $14,689. About 10.6% of families and 14.2% of the population were below the poverty line, including 12.8% of those under the age of eighteen and 18.9% of those 65 or over.

== Images ==
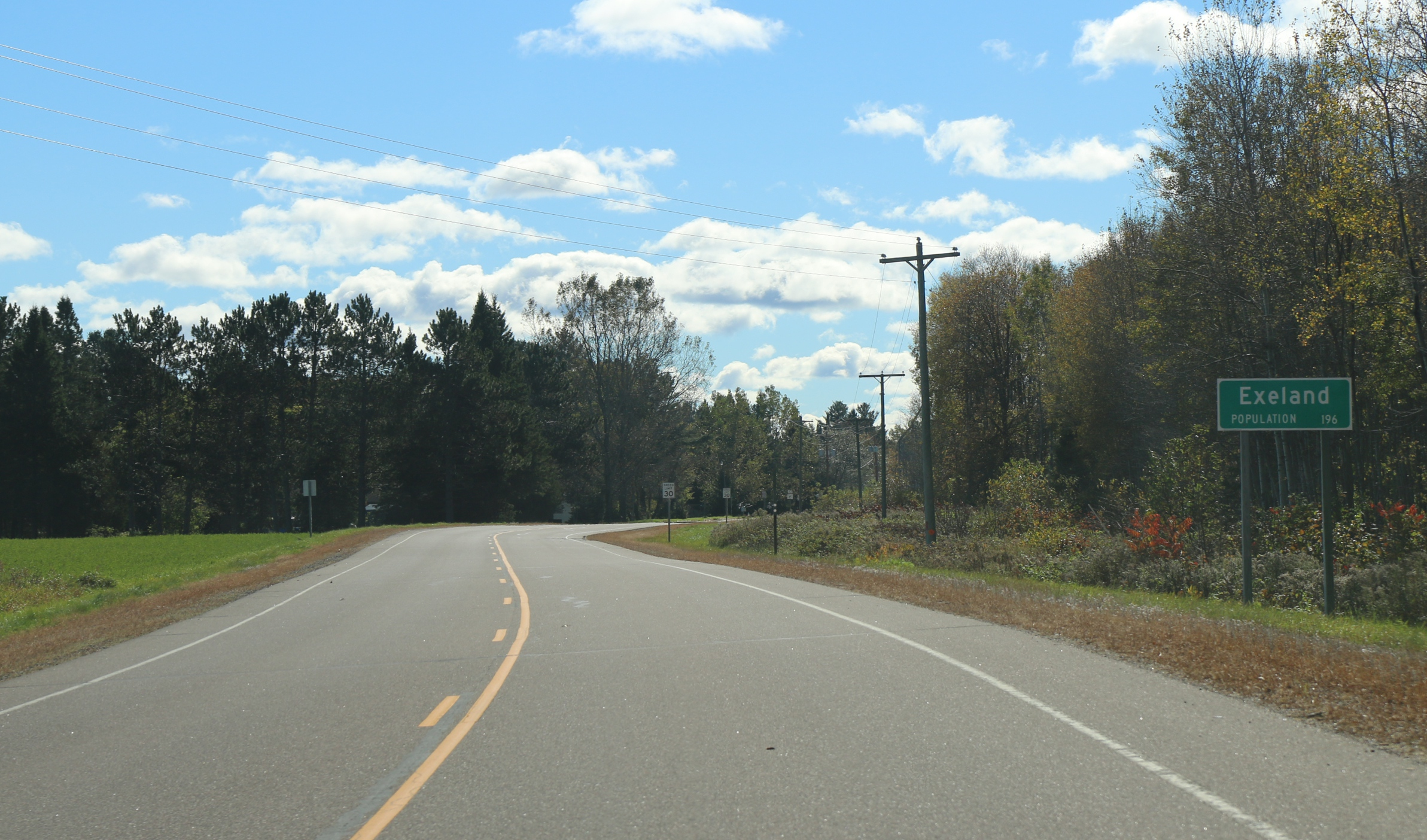
The sign for Exeland on WIS48

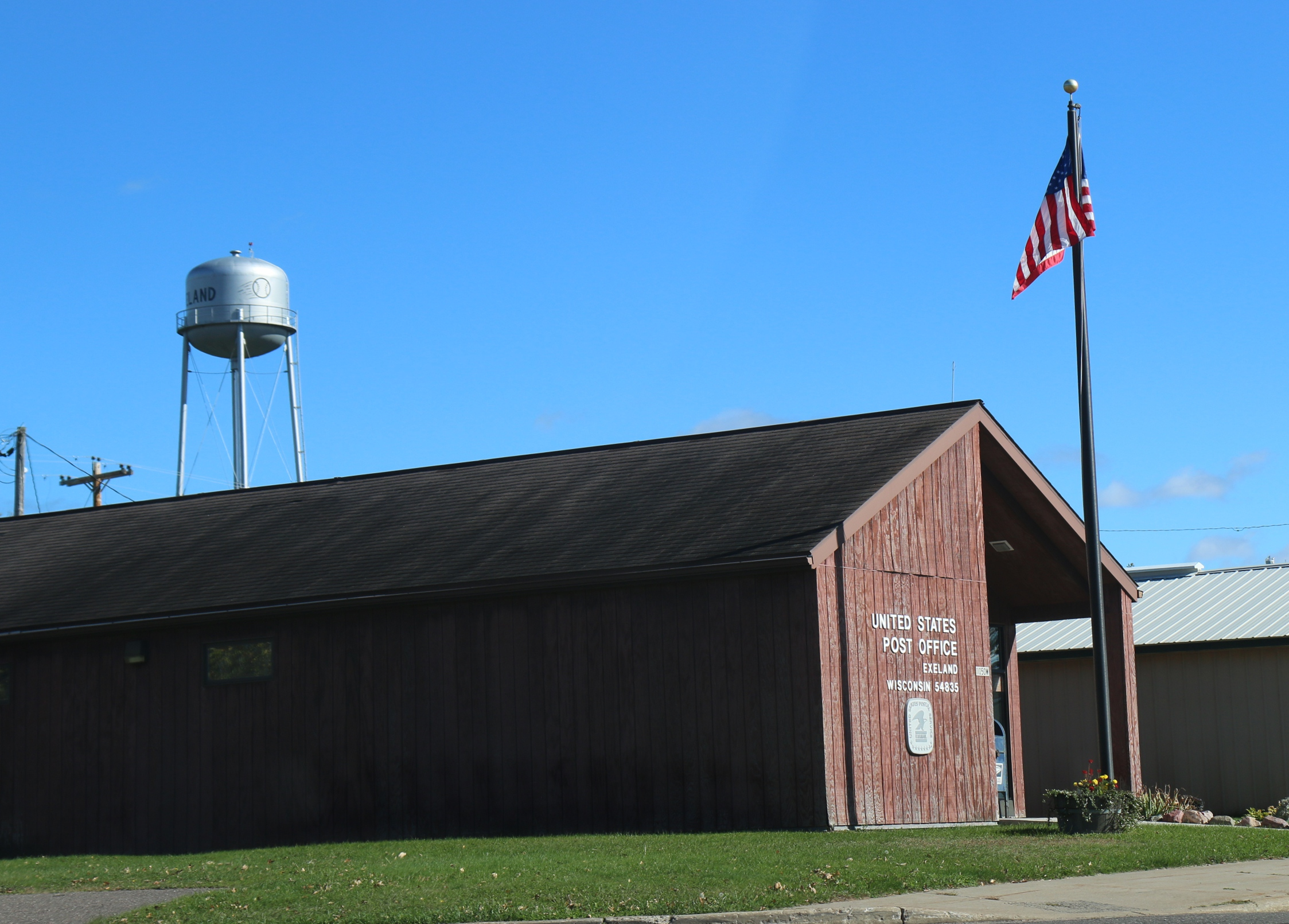
Post office and water tower for Exeland

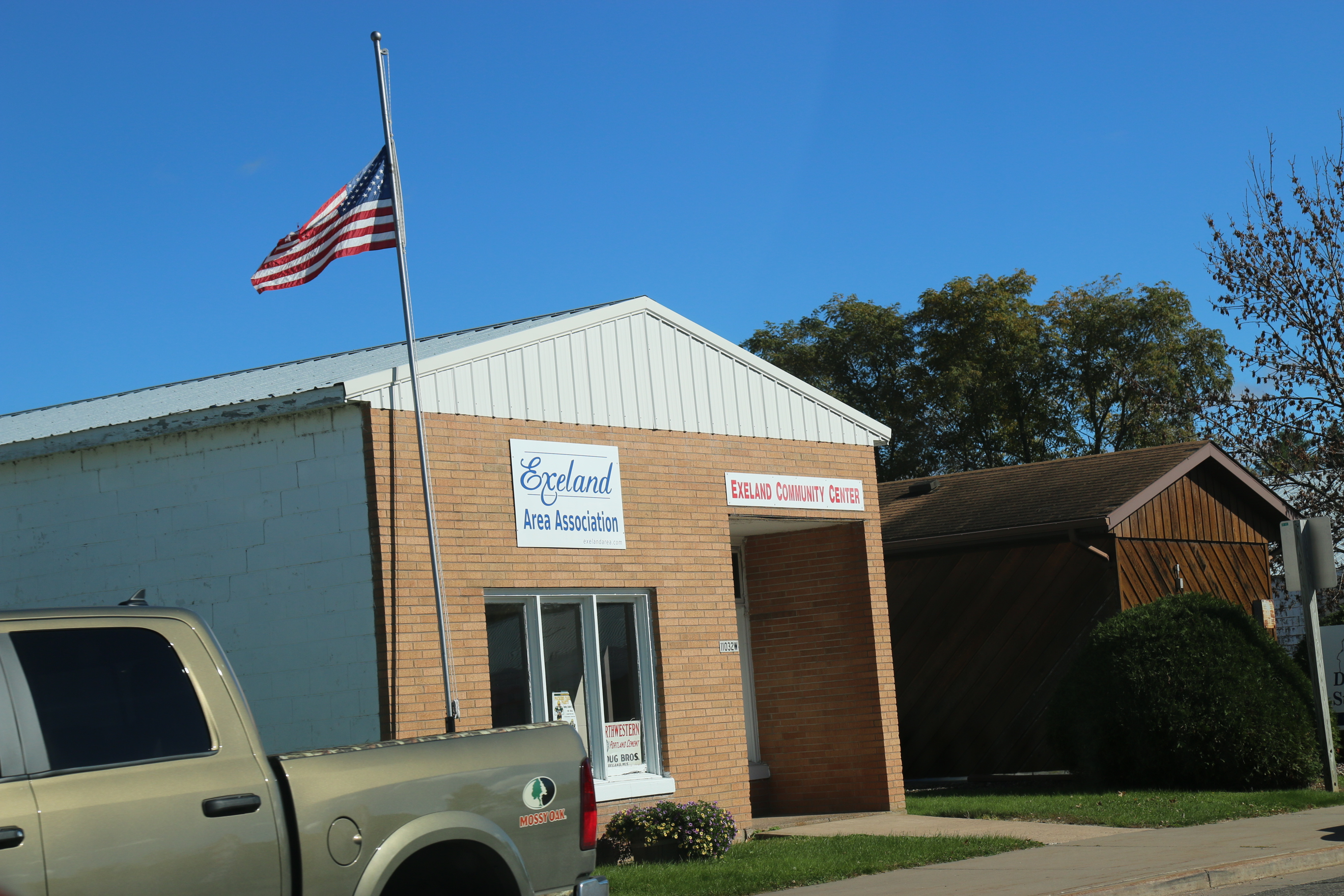
Community Center
