= Radisson, Wisconsin =

- Village
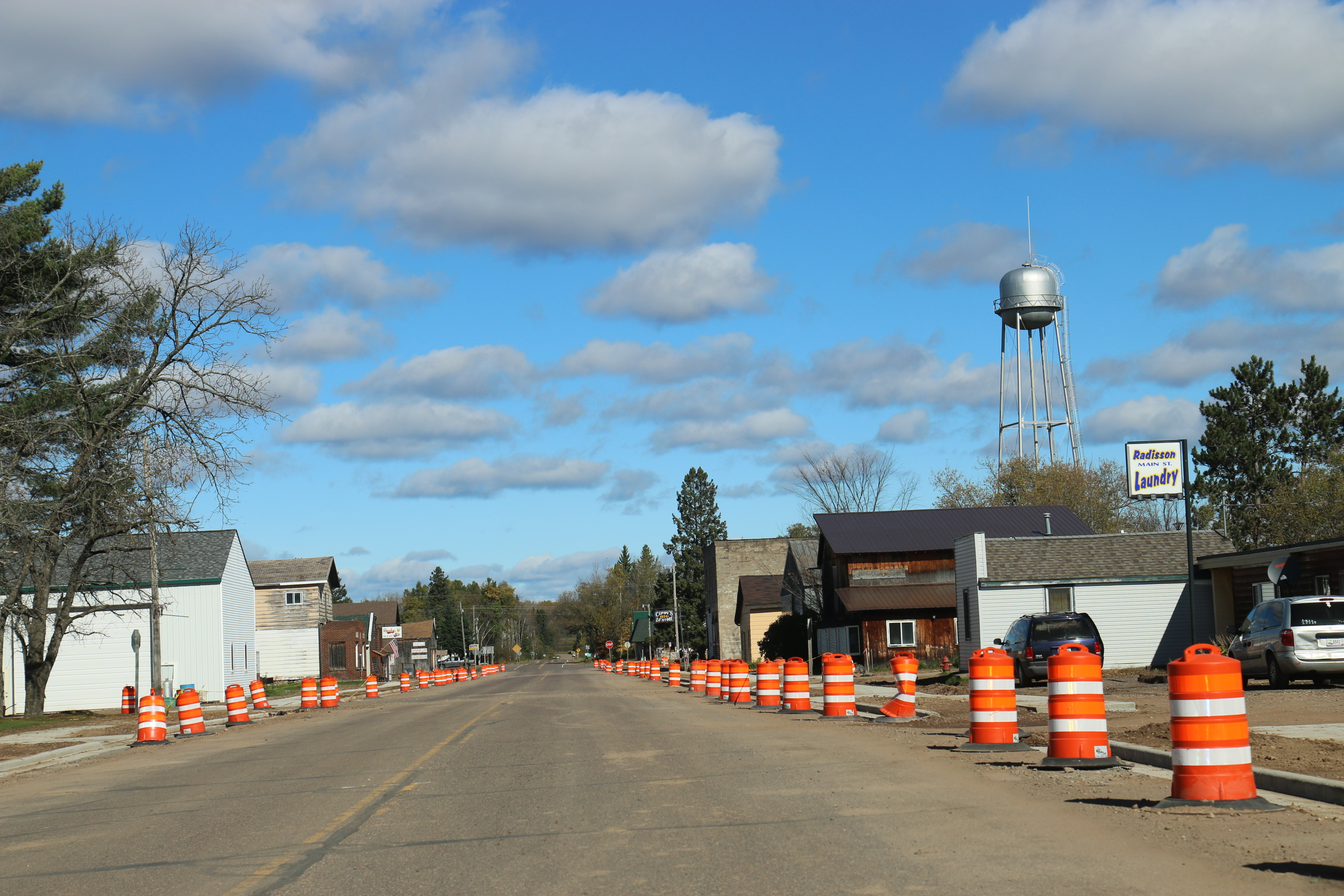
- Downtown Radisson on WIS40

- Location of Radisson in Sawyer County, Wisconsin.
- Coordinates: 45°46′55″N 91°11′54″W
- Country: United States
- State: Wisconsin
- County: Sawyer

Area
  - Total: 0.42 sq mi (1.10 km^{2})
  - Land: 0.39 sq mi (1.02 km^{2})
  - Water: 0.027 sq mi (0.07 km^{2})
- Elevation: 1,273 ft (388 m)

Population (2020)
  - Total: 273
  - Density: 693/sq mi (268/km^{2})
- Time zone: UTC-6 (Central (CST))
  - Summer (DST): UTC-5 (CDT)
- Area codes: 715 & 534
- FIPS code: 55-66075
- GNIS feature ID: 1572019
- Website: https://radissonwi.org/

Radisson is a village in Sawyer County, Wisconsin, United States, along the Couderay River. The population was 273 at the 2020 census, and 241 at the 2010 census. The village is located within the Town of Radisson and was named in honor of the early French explorer, Pierre-Esprit Radisson (c.1636–1710).

== Geography ==
According to the United States Census Bureau, the village has a total land area of 0.39 square miles (1.01 km^{2}).

== Demographics ==
Historical population
| Census | Pop. | Note | %± |
|---|---|---|---|
| 1960 | 179 | | — |
| 1970 | 206 | | 15.1% |
| 1980 | 280 | | 35.9% |
| 1990 | 237 | | −15.4% |
| 2000 | 222 | | −6.3% |
| 2010 | 241 | | 8.6% |
| 2020 | 273 | | 13.3% |
U.S. Decennial Census

=== 2010 census ===
As of 2010 census, there were 241 people, 110 households, and 57 families living in the village. The population density was 617.9 inhabitants per square mile (238.6/km^{2}). There were 140 housing units at an average density of 359.0 per square mile (138.6/km^{2}). The racial makeup of the village was 83.0% White, 3.3% African American, 5.0% Native American, 1.2% Asian, 1.7% from other races, and 5.8% from two or more races. Hispanic or Latino of any race were 5.0% of the population.

There were 110 households, of which 25.5% had children under the age of 18 living with them, 32.7% were married couples living together, 13.6% had a female householder with no husband present, 5.5% had a male householder with no wife present, and 48.2% were non-families. 40.9% of the households were made up of individuals, and 19.1% had someone living alone aged 65 or older. The average household size was 2.19 and the average family size was 2.91.

The median age in the village was 44.5 years. 24.9% of residents were under the age of 18; 5% were between the ages of 18 and 24; 21.6% were from 25 to 44; 26.7% were from 45 to 64; and 22% were 65 years or older. The gender makeup of the village was 52.7% male and 47.3% female.

=== 2000 census ===
As of 2000 census, there were 222 people, 98 households, and 58 families living in the village. The population density was 553.2 people per square mile (214.3/km^{2}). There were 131 housing units at an average density of 326.4 per square mile (126.4/km^{2}). The racial makeup of the village was 89.19% White, 0.45% Black or African American, 9.01% Native American, 0.90% from other races, and 0.45% from two or more races. 2.70% of the population were Hispanic or Latino of any race.

There were 98 households, out of which 28.6% had children under the age of 18 living with them, 44.9% were married couples living together, 9.2% had a female householder with no husband present, and 40.8% were non-families. 31.6% of all households were made up of individuals, and 14.3% had someone living alone aged 65 years or older. The average household size was 2.27 and the average family size was 2.84.

In the village, the population was spread out, with 24.3% under the age of 18, 7.2% from 18 to 24, 25.7% from 25 to 44, 21.2% from 45 to 64, and 21.6% 65 years of age or older. The median age was 41 years. For every 100 females, there were 89.7 males. For every 100 females aged 18 years and over, there were 100.0 males.

The median income for a household in the village was $25,625, and the median income for a family was $38,500. Males had a median income of $37,813 and females had $18,750. The per capita income for the village was $16,122. About 8.9% of families and 16.5% of the population were below the poverty line, including 14.1% under the age of 18 and 14.0% aged 65 or older.

== Images ==
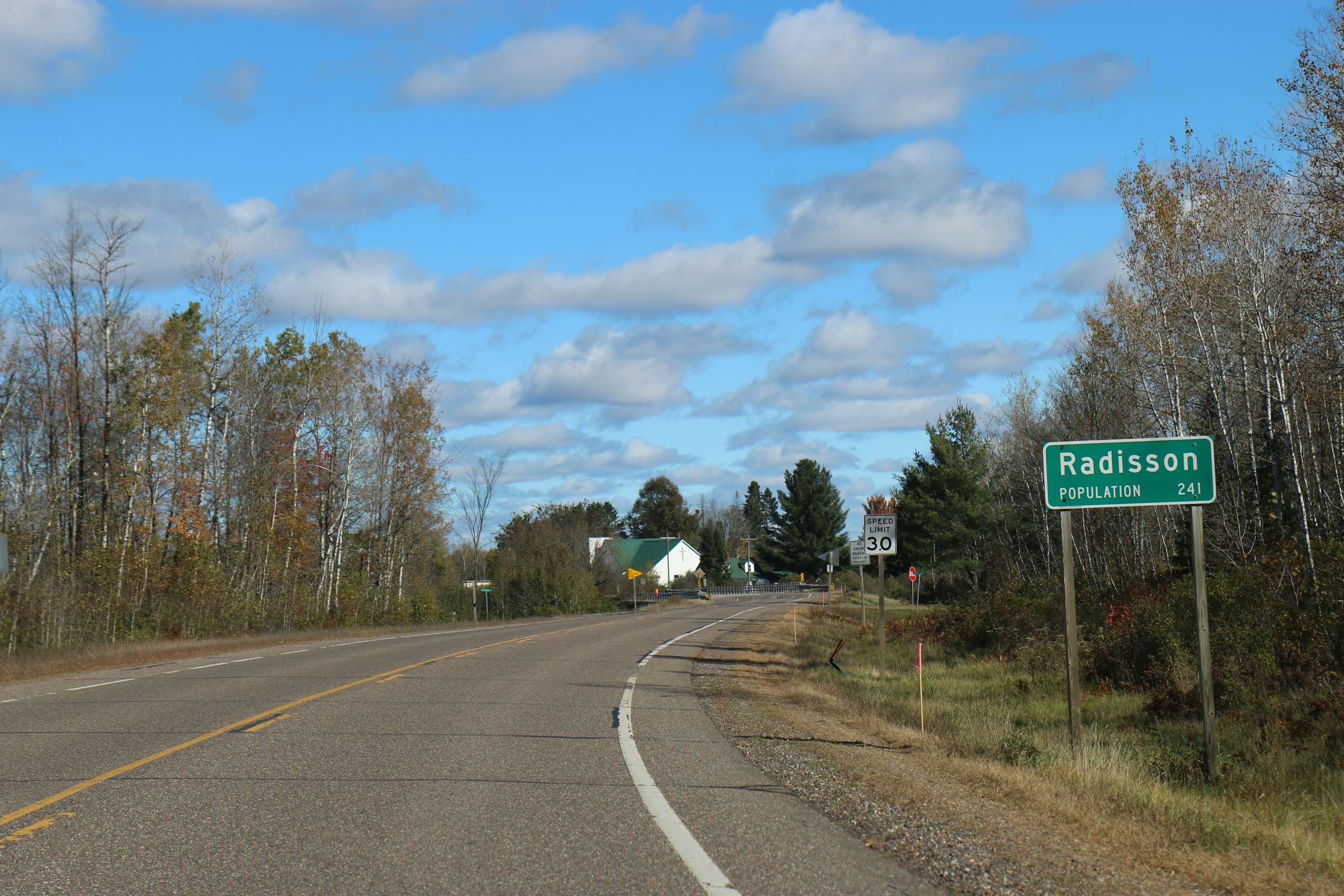
The sign for Radisson on WIS40

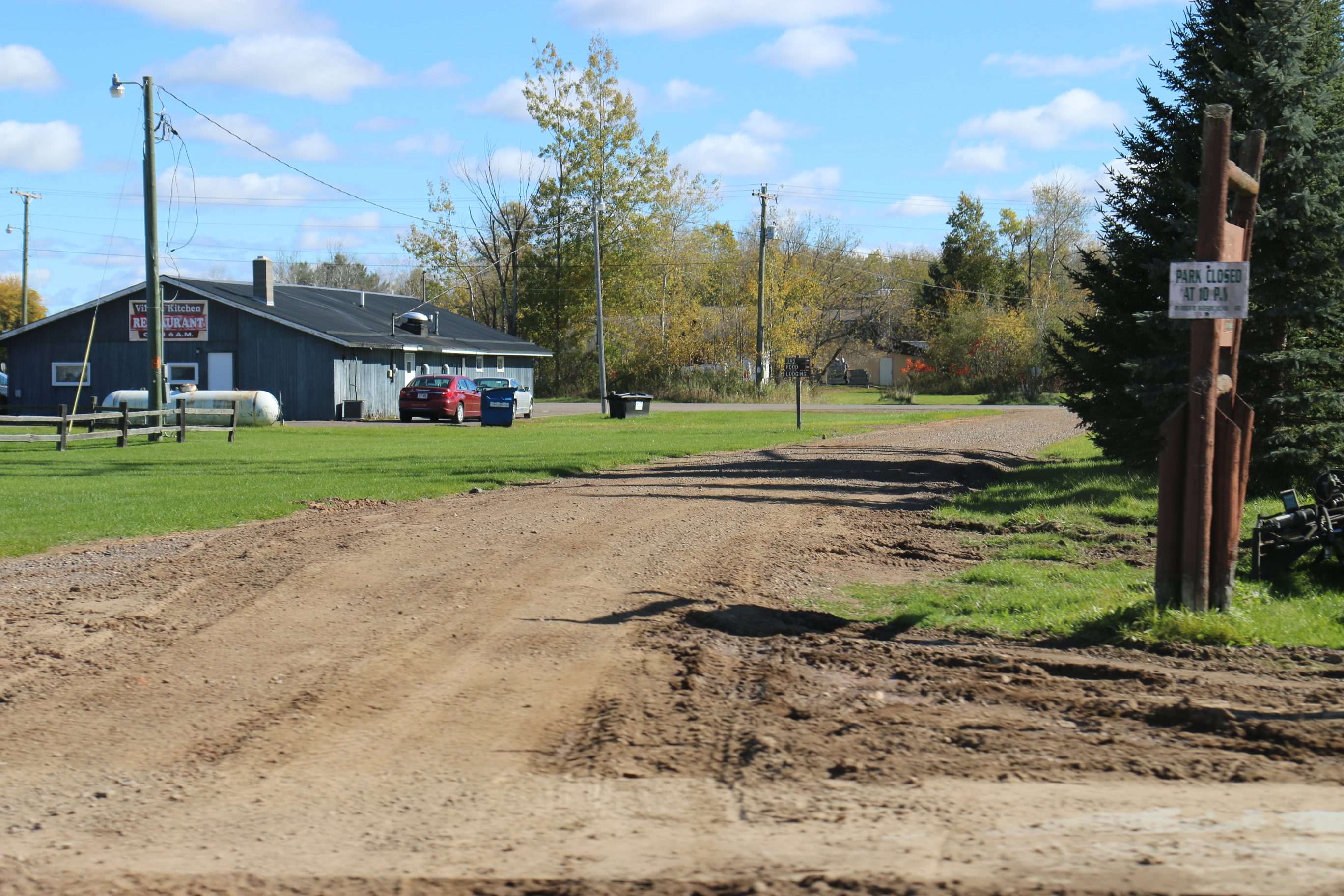
Tuscobia State Trail in Radisson
