= North Wisconsin Lumber Company Office =

- U.S. National Register of Historic Places
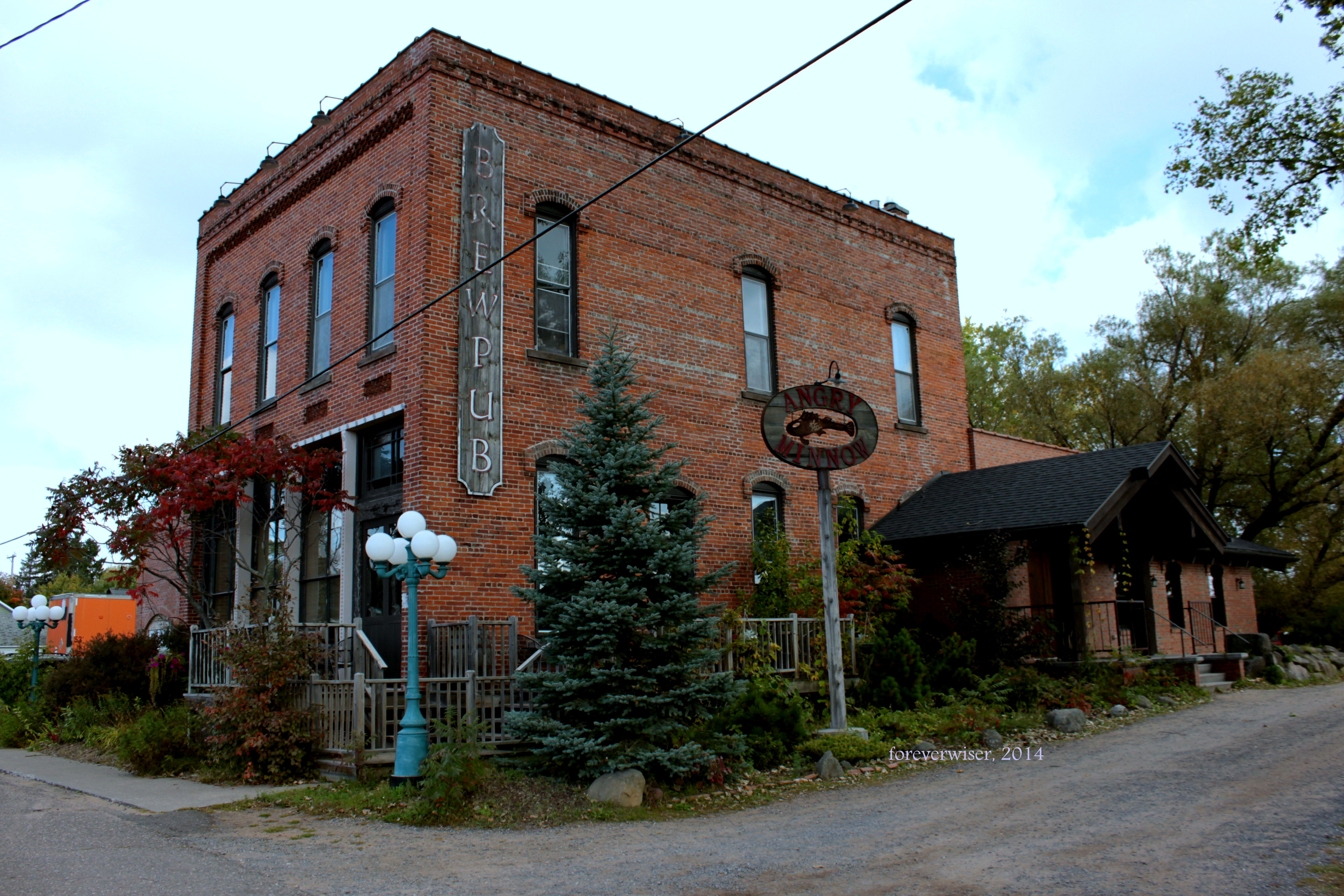

- Location within Wisconsin Location within the United States
- Location: Florida Ave., Hayward, Wisconsin
- Coordinates: 46°0′37″N 91°29′19″W
- Area: 0.1 acres (0.040 ha)
- Built: 1889
- NRHP reference No.: 80000403
- Added to NRHP: May 7, 1980

The North Wisconsin Lumber Company Office is a historic building in Hayward, Wisconsin. The office was built in 1889 by the North Wisconsin Lumber Company, a prominent logging company in Wisconsin's Namekagon region which was founded by A.J. Hayward and R.L. McCormick. The building's design includes cast iron columns in its storefront, tall windows with arched lintels, and brick corbels and dentils.

The office was added to the National Register of Historic Places on May 7, 1980.

== Gallery ==
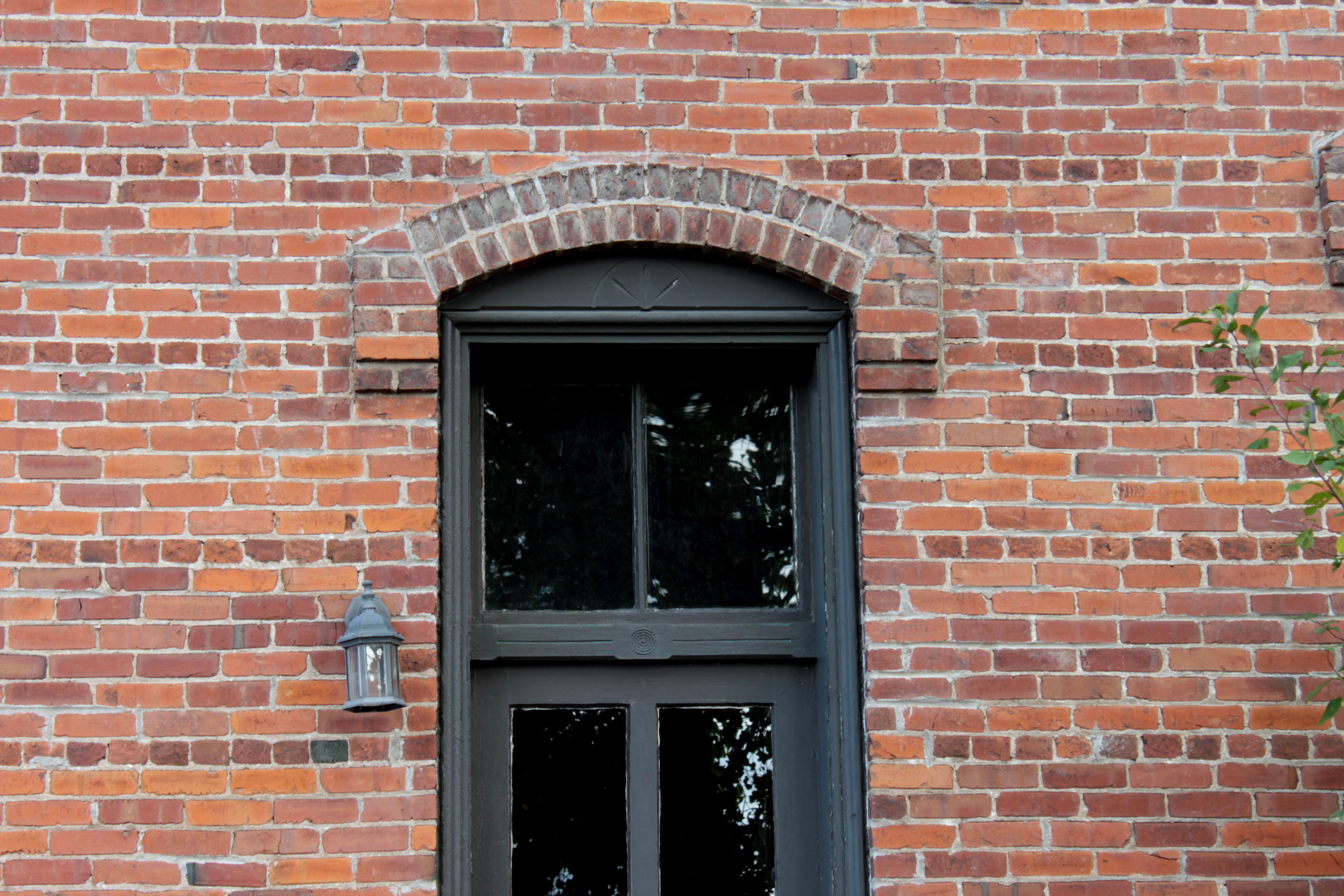
Brickwork around a window

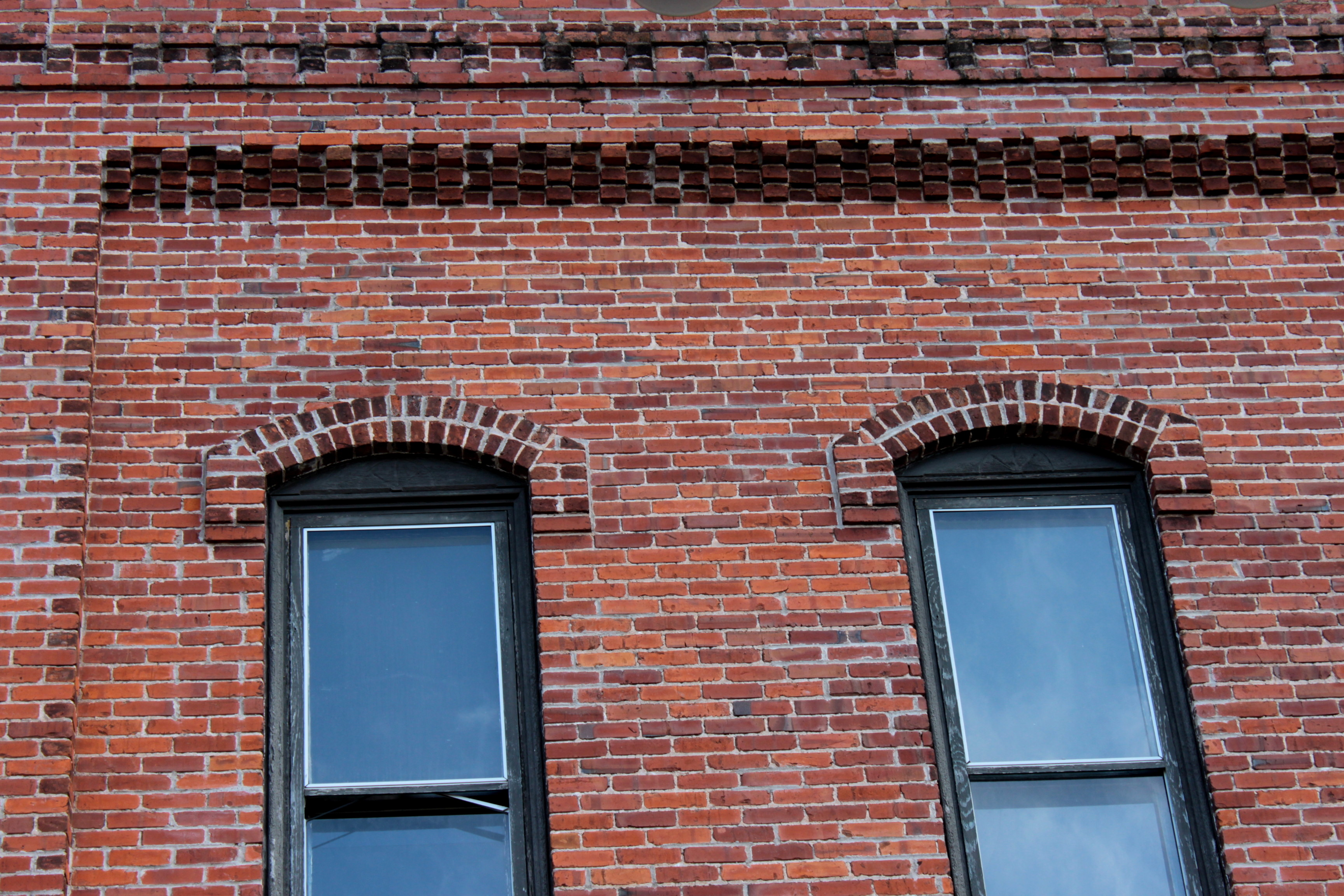
Brick corbelling and dentillation above two windows
