= 1921 in the United States =

- Decades: 1900s; 1910s; 1920s; 1930s; 1940s
- See also: History of the United States (1918–1945); Timeline of United States history (1900–1929); List of years in the United States

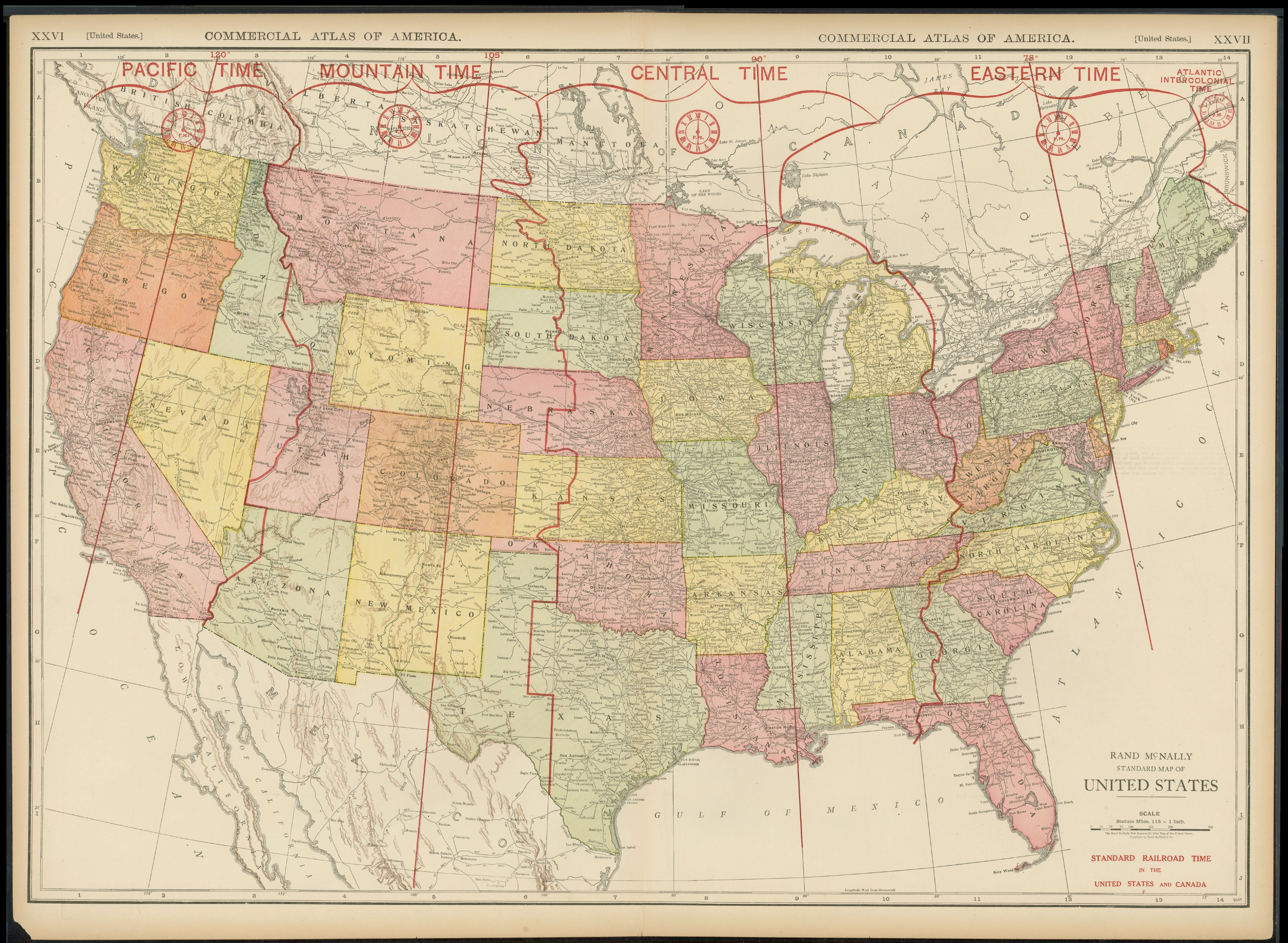
Rand McNally Standard Map of the United States, 1921

Events from the year 1921 in the United States.

== Incumbents ==
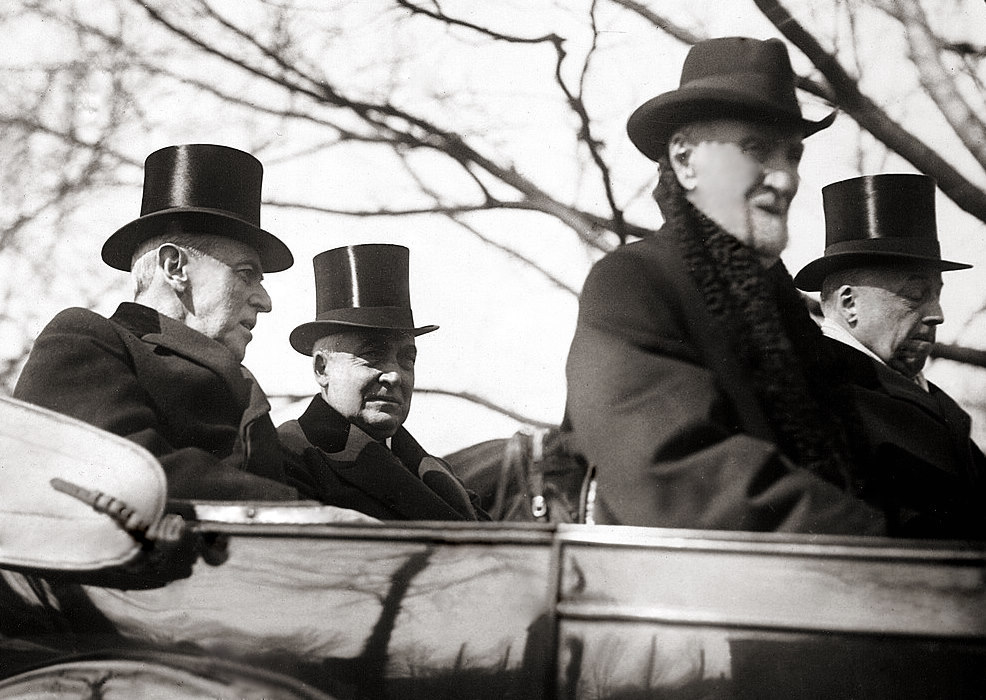
Warren G. Harding inauguration, March 4, 1921. Harding at right in back seat; Woodrow Wilson at left.

=== Federal government ===
- President:

Woodrow Wilson (D-New Jersey) (until March 4)
Warren G. Harding (R-Ohio) (starting March 4)

- Vice President:

Thomas R. Marshall (D-Indiana) (until March 4)
Calvin Coolidge (R-Massachusetts) (starting March 4)

- Chief Justice:

Edward Douglass White (Louisiana) (until May 19)
William Howard Taft (Ohio) (starting July 11)

- Speaker of the House of Representatives: Frederick H. Gillett (R-Massachusetts)
- Senate Majority Leader: Henry Cabot Lodge (R-Massachusetts)
- Congress: 66th (until March 4), 67th (starting March 4)

==== State governments ====
Governors and lieutenant governors

=== Governors ===
- Governor of Alabama: Thomas Kilby (Democratic)
- Governor of Arizona: Thomas Edward Campbell (Republican)
- Governor of Arkansas: Charles Hillman Brough (Democratic) (until January 11), Thomas Chipman McRae (Democratic) (starting January 11)
- Governor of California: William Stephens (Republican)
- Governor of Colorado: Oliver Henry Shoup (Republican)
- Governor of Connecticut: Marcus H. Holcomb (Republican) (until January 5), Everett J. Lake (Republican) (starting January 5)
- Governor of Delaware: John G. Townsend, Jr. (Republican) (until January 16), William D. Denney (Republican) (starting January 16)
- Governor of Florida: Sidney Johnston Catts (Prohibition) (until January 4), Cary A. Hardee (Democratic) (starting January 4)
- Governor of Georgia: Hugh M. Dorsey (Democratic) (until June 25), Thomas W. Hardwick (Democratic) (starting June 25)
- Governor of Idaho: D. W. Davis (Republican)
- Governor of Illinois: Frank O. Lowden (Republican) (until January 10), Len Small (Republican) (starting January 10)
- Governor of Indiana: James P. Goodrich (Republican) (until January 10), Warren T. McCray (Republican) (starting January 10)
- Governor of Iowa: William L. Harding (Republican) (until January 13), Nathan E. Kendall (Republican) (starting January 13)
- Governor of Kansas: Henry J. Allen (Republican)
- Governor of Kentucky: Edwin P. Morrow (Republican)
- Governor of Louisiana: John M. Parker (Democratic)
- Governor of Maine:
  - until January 5: Carl E. Milliken (Republican)
  - January 5 – 31: Frederic Hale Parkhurst (Republican)
  - starting January 31: Percival Proctor Baxter (Republican)
- Governor of Maryland: Albert C. Ritchie (Democratic)
- Governor of Massachusetts: Calvin Coolidge (Republican) (until January 6), Channing H. Cox (Republican) (starting January 6)
- Governor of Michigan: Albert Sleeper (Republican) (until January 1), Alex Groesbeck (Republican) (starting January 1)
- Governor of Minnesota: J. A. A. Burnquist (Republican) (until January 5), J. A. O. Preus (Republican) (starting January 5)
- Governor of Mississippi: Lee M. Russell (Democratic)
- Governor of Missouri: Frederick D. Gardner (Democratic) (until January 10), Arthur M. Hyde (Republican) (starting January 10)
- Governor of Montana: Sam V. Stewart (Democratic) (until January 3), Joseph M. Dixon (Republican) (starting January 3)
- Governor of Nebraska: Samuel R. McKelvie (Republican)
- Governor of Nevada: Emmet D. Boyle (Democratic)
- Governor of New Hampshire: John H. Bartlett (Republican) (until January 6), Albert O. Brown (Republican) (starting January 6)
- Governor of New Jersey: Edward I. Edwards (Democratic)
- Governor of New Mexico: Merritt C. Mechem (Republican)
- Governor of New York: Nathan L. Miller (Republican)
- Governor of North Carolina: Cameron A. Morrison (Democratic)
- Governor of North Dakota: Lynn Frazier (Republican/Nonpartisan League) (until November 23), Ragnvald Nestos (Republican) (starting November 23)
- Governor of Ohio: James M. Cox (Democratic) (until January 10), Harry L. Davis (Republican) (starting January 10)
- Governor of Oklahoma: James B. A. Robertson (Democratic)
- Governor of Oregon: Ben W. Olcott (Republican)
- Governor of Pennsylvania: William Cameron Sproul (Republican)
- Governor of Rhode Island: R. Livingston Beeckman (Republican) (until January 4), Emery J. San Souci (Republican) (starting January 4)
- Governor of South Carolina: Robert Archer Cooper (Democratic)
- Governor of South Dakota: Peter Norbeck (Republican) (until January 4), William H. McMaster (Republican) (starting January 4)
- Governor of Tennessee: A. H. Roberts (Democratic) (until January 15), Alfred A. Taylor (Republican) (starting January 15)
- Governor of Texas: William P. Hobby (Democratic) (until January 18), Pat Morris Neff (Democratic) (starting January 18)
- Governor of Utah: Simon Bamberger (Democratic) (until January 3), Charles R. Mabey (Republican) (starting January 3)
- Governor of Vermont: Percival W. Clement (Republican) (until January 6), James Hartness (Republican) (starting January 6)
- Governor of Virginia: Westmoreland Davis (Democratic)
- Governor of Washington: Louis Folwell Hart (Republican)
- Governor of West Virginia: John J. Cornwell (Democratic) (until March 4), Ephraim F. Morgan (Republican) (starting March 4)
- Governor of Wisconsin: Emanuel L. Philipp (Republican) (until January 3), John J. Blaine (Republican) (starting January 3)
- Governor of Wyoming: Robert D. Carey (Republican)

=== Lieutenant governors ===
- Lieutenant Governor of Alabama: Nathan Lee Miller (Democratic)
- Lieutenant Governor of California: Clement Calhoun Young (Republican)
- Lieutenant Governor of Colorado: George Stepham (Republican) (until month and day unknown), Earl Cooley (Republican) (starting month and day unknown)
- Lieutenant Governor of Connecticut: Clifford B. Wilson (Republican) (until January 5), Charles A. Templeton (Republican) (starting January 5)
- Lieutenant Governor of Delaware: vacant (until January 18), J. Danforth Bush (Republican) (starting January 18)
- Lieutenant Governor of Idaho: Charles C. Moore (Republican)
- Lieutenant Governor of Illinois: John G. Oglesby (Republican) (until January 10), Fred E. Sterling (Republican) (starting January 10)
- Lieutenant Governor of Indiana: Edgar D. Bush (Republican) (until January 10), Emmett Forrest Branch (Republican) (starting January 10)
- Lieutenant Governor of Iowa: Ernest Robert Moore (Republican) (until January 13), John Hammill (Republican) (starting January 13)
- Lieutenant Governor of Kansas: Charles S. Huffman (Republican)
- Lieutenant Governor of Kentucky: S. Thruston Ballard (Republican)
- Lieutenant Governor of Louisiana: Hewitt Bouanchaud (Democratic)
- Lieutenant Governor of Massachusetts: Channing H. Cox (Republican) (until January 6), Alvan T. Fuller (Republican) (starting January 6)
- Lieutenant Governor of Michigan: Luren D. Dickinson (Republican) (until January 1), Thomas Read (Republican) (starting January 1)
- Lieutenant Governor of Minnesota: Thomas Frankson (Republican) (until January 4), Louis L. Collins (Republican) (starting January 4)
- Lieutenant Governor of Mississippi: Homer H. Casteel (Democratic)
- Lieutenant Governor of Missouri: Wallace Crossley (Democratic) (until month and day unknown), Hiram Lloyd (Republican) (starting month and day unknown)
- Lieutenant Governor of Montana: W. W. McDowell (Democratic) (until January 2), Nelson Story Jr. (Republican) (starting January 2)
- Lieutenant Governor of Nebraska: Pelham A. Barrows (Republican)
- Lieutenant Governor of Nevada: Maurice J. Sullivan (Democratic)
- Lieutenant Governor of New Mexico: Benjamin F. Pankey (Republican) (until January 1), William H. Duckworth (Republican) (starting January 1)
- Lieutenant Governor of New York: Jeremiah Wood (Republican) (starting January 1)
- Lieutenant Governor of North Carolina: Oliver Max Gardner (Democratic) (until January 12), William B. Cooper (Democratic) (starting January 12)
- Lieutenant Governor of North Dakota: Howard R. Wood (Republican)
- Lieutenant Governor of Ohio: Clarence J. Brown Sr. (Republican)
- Lieutenant Governor of Oklahoma: Martin E. Trapp (Democratic)
- Lieutenant Governor of Pennsylvania: Edward E. Beidleman (Republican)
- Lieutenant Governor of Rhode Island: Emery J. San Souci (Republican) (until January 4), Harold Gross (Republican) (starting January 4)
- Lieutenant Governor of South Carolina: J. T. Liles (Democratic) (until January 18), Wilson Godfrey Harvey (Democratic) (starting January 18)
- Lieutenant Governor of South Dakota: William H. McMaster (Republican) (until January 4), Carl Gunderson (Republican) (starting January 4)
- Lieutenant Governor of Tennessee: Andrew L. Todd, Sr. (Democratic) (until month and day unknown), William West Bond (Democratic) (starting month and day unknown)
- Lieutenant Governor of Texas: Willard Arnold Johnson (Democratic) (until January 18), Lynch Davidson (Democratic) (starting January 18)
- Lieutenant Governor of Vermont: Mason S. Stone (Republican) (until January 6), Abram W. Foote (Republican) (starting January 6)
- Lieutenant Governor of Virginia: Benjamin Franklin Buchanan (Democratic)
- Lieutenant Governor of Washington: vacant (until January 10), William J. Coyle (Republican) (starting January 10)
- Lieutenant Governor of Wisconsin: Edward F. Dithmar (Republican) (until January 3), George F. Comings (Republican) (starting January 3)

== Events ==
=== January–March ===
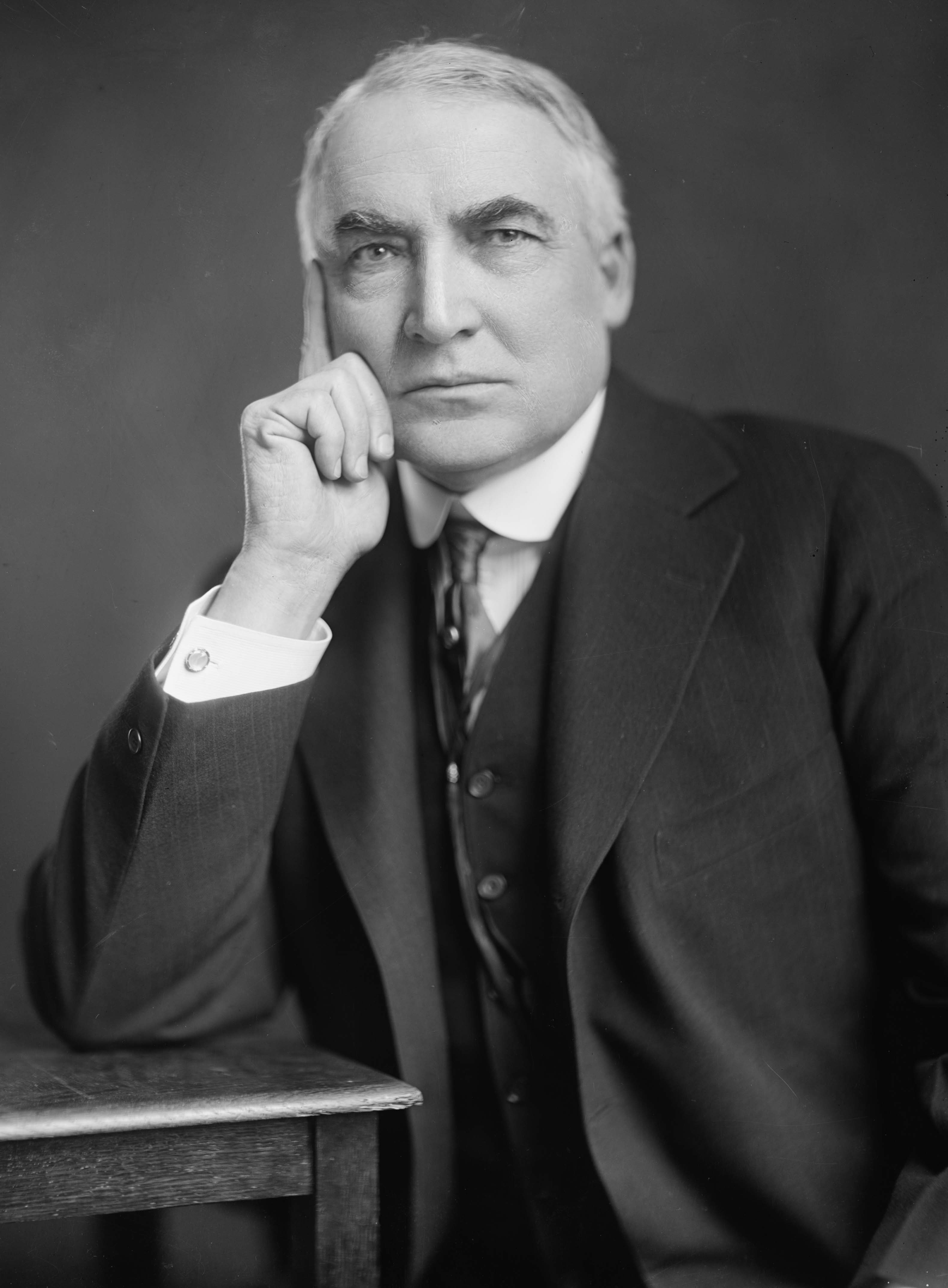
March 4: Warren G. Harding becomes the 29th U.S. president

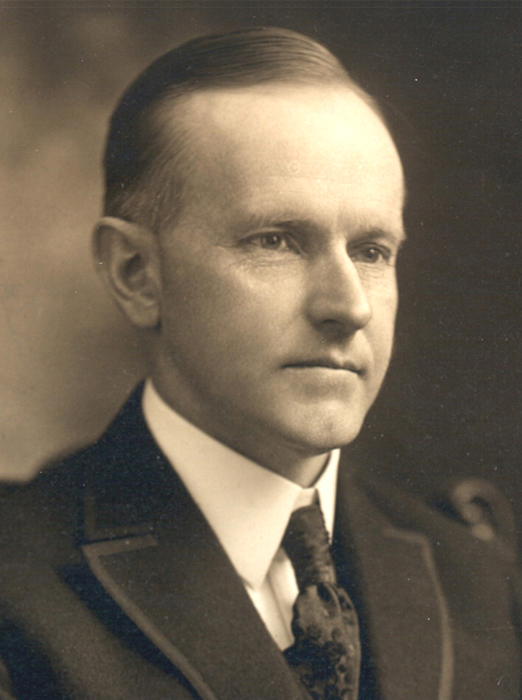
Calvin Coolidge becomes the 29th U.S. vice president

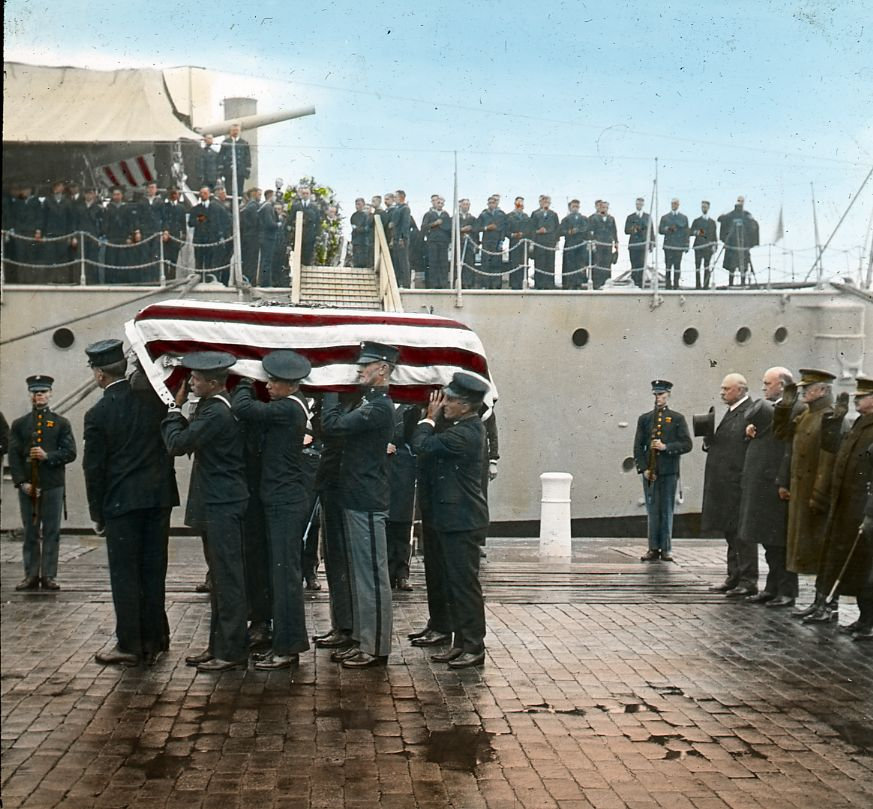
Unknown Soldier from World War I being taken from the USS Olympia (C-6) at the Washington Navy Yard and transported to the US Capitol to lay in state. On November 11 the body is interred at Arlington National Cemetery.

- January – E. W. Scripps and William Emerson Ritter found Science Service, later renamed Society for Science & the Public, in the United States, with the goal of keeping the public informed of scientific developments.
- January 1 – In American football, the University of California defeats Ohio State 28–0 in the Rose Bowl.
- January 2
  - The first religious radio broadcast is heard, over station KDKA (AM) in Pittsburgh, Pennsylvania.
  - The De Young Museum opens in Golden Gate Park, San Francisco.
- January 21 – The full-length silent comedy-drama film The Kid, written, produced, directed by and starring Charlie Chaplin (in his Tramp character), with Jackie Coogan, is released.
- March 4 – Warren G. Harding is sworn in as the 29th president of the United States, and Calvin Coolidge is sworn in as the 29th vice president of the United States.
- March 25 – The first Lowe's opens in North Wilkesboro, North Carolina.

=== April–June ===
- April – The United States Figure Skating Association is formed.
- April 20 – Ferenc Molnár's play Liliom is first produced on Broadway in English.
- May 19 – The Emergency Quota Act passes the U.S. Congress, establishing national quotas on immigration. Because this drastically limits immigration from Eastern Europe, Jews emigrating from there begin to prefer Palestine as a destination rather than the U.S.
- May 22 – In the first golf international between the two countries, the United States beats the United Kingdom 9 rounds to 3.
- May 27 – First victim of the Osage Indian murders is discovered in Osage County, Oklahoma.
- May 31–June 1 – Tulsa Race Massacre (Greenwood Massacre): Mobs of white residents attack black residents and businesses in Greenwood District, Tulsa, Oklahoma. The official death toll is 36, but later investigations suggest an actual figure between 100 and 300. 1,250 homes are destroyed and roughly 6,000 African Americans imprisoned in one of the worst incidents of mass racial violence in the United States.
- June 15
  - 29-year-old Bessie Coleman gets her pilot's licence in France and becomes the first African American to earn an international pilot's licence.
  - Compagnie Générale Transatlantique's liner SS Paris (1916) makes her maiden voyage from Le Havre to New York.

=== July–September ===
- July 2 – U.S. President Warren Harding signs a joint congressional resolution declaring an end to America's state of war with Germany, Austria and Hungary.
- July 11 – Former President of the United States William Howard Taft is sworn in as Chief Justice of the United States, making him the only person ever to hold both positions.
- July 14 – A Massachusetts jury finds Nicola Sacco and Bartolomeo Vanzetti guilty of first degree murder following a widely publicized trial.
- July 26 – U.S. President Warren G. Harding receives Princess Fatima of Afghanistan who is escorted by imposter Stanley Clifford Weyman.
- August 5 – The first radio baseball game is broadcast: Harold Arlin announces the Pirates-Phillies game from Forbes Field over Westinghouse KDKA in Pittsburgh.
- August 11
  - Franklin D. Roosevelt's paralytic illness strikes while he is vacationing on Campobello Island; on August 25 he is diagnosed with polio and aged 39 becomes permanently disabled.
  - James Coyle, a Catholic priest in Birmingham, Alabama, is shot and killed by Klan member E. R. Stephenson after presiding over the wedding of Stephenson's daughter, Ruth, and Pedro Gussman, a Puerto Rican working for her father.
- August 25–September 2 – An uprising of striking coal miners in West Virginia leads to the Battle of Blair Mountain.
- September - A hurricane hits Texas, followed by flooding that left at least 224 people dead.
- September 5 – Popular comedian Roscoe "Fatty" Arbuckle attends a party at the St. Francis Hotel, San Francisco, during which actress Virginia Rappe is fatally injured; although he is eventually acquitted of rape and manslaughter, the scandal derails his career.
- September 8 – Sixteen-year-old Margaret Gorman wins the Golden Mermaid trophy at a beauty pageant in Atlantic City, New Jersey; officials later dub her the first Miss America.
- September 13 – White Castle hamburger restaurant opens in Wichita, Kansas, the foundation of the world's first fast food chain.

=== October–December ===
- October 5 – The World Series baseball game in North America is first broadcast on the radio, by Newark, New Jersey, station WJZ, Pittsburgh station KDKA, and a group of other commercial and amateur stations throughout the eastern U.S.
- October 8 – The first Sweetest Day is staged in Cleveland, Ohio.
- October 26 – The Chicago Theatre, the oldest surviving grand movie palace, opens.
- October 29
  - Construction of the Link River Dam, a part of the Klamath Project in Oregon, is completed.
  - 1921 Centre vs. Harvard football game: Centre College's football team, led by quarterback Bo McMillin, defeats Harvard University 6–0 to snap Harvard's five-year winning streak. For decades afterward, this is called "football's upset of the century."
- November 11 – During an Armistice Day ceremony at Arlington National Cemetery, the Tomb of the Unknowns is dedicated by U.S. President Warren G. Harding.
- November 23 – The Sheppard–Towner Act is signed by President Harding, providing federal funding for maternity and child care.
- December 13 – In the Four Power Treaty on Insular Possessions, the Empire of Japan, the United States, United Kingdom and French Third Republic agree to recognize the status quo in the Pacific.

=== Undated ===
- Simon Rodia begins construction of the Watts Towers in Los Angeles.
- The central tower is added to the De Young (museum) museum in Golden Gate Park, San Francisco.
- Potawatomi Zoo established in South Bend, Indiana.
- The Tau Epsilon Chi Jewish high school sorority is founded in Atlantic City, New Jersey.

=== Ongoing ===
- Lochner era (c. 1897–c. 1937)
- U.S. occupation of Haiti (1915–1934)
- U.S. occupation of the Dominican Republic (1916-1924)
- Prohibition (1920–1933)
- Depression of 1920–21 (1920–1921)
- Roaring Twenties (1920–1929)

== Births ==
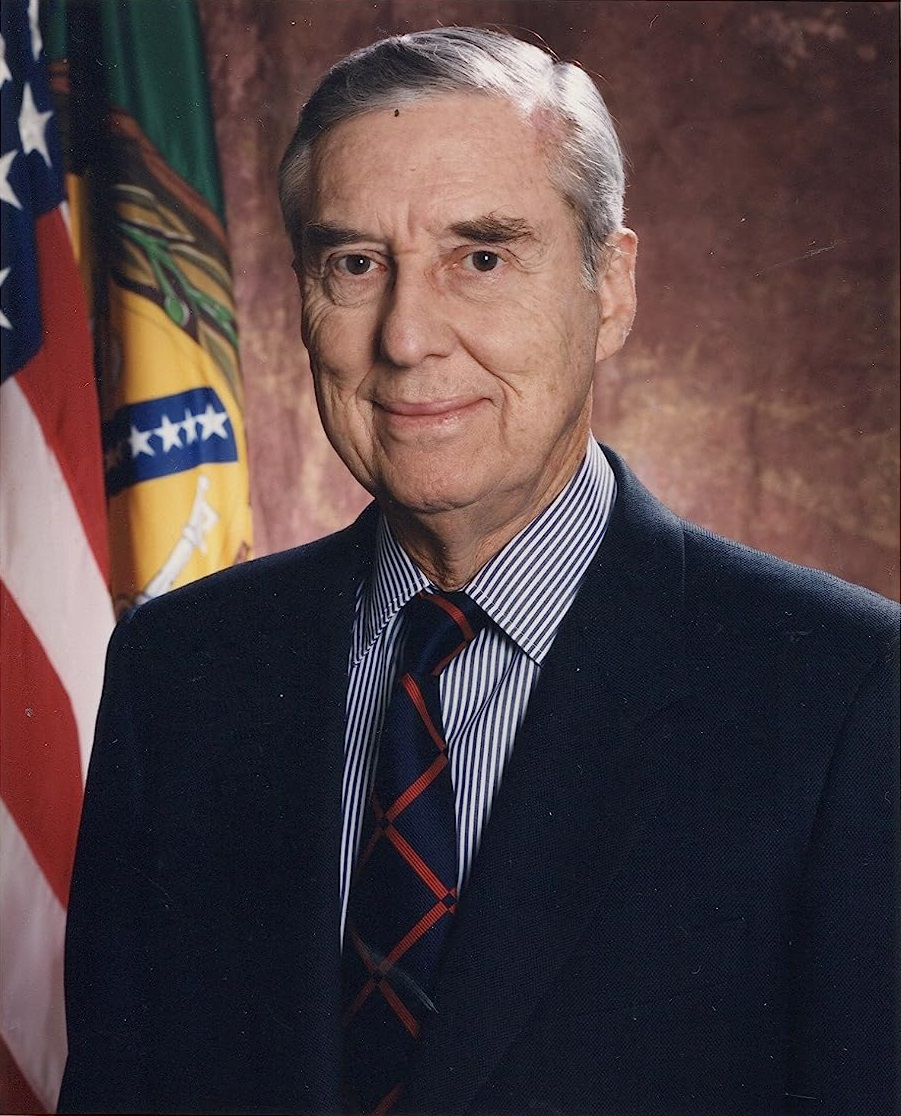
Lloyd Bentsen

- January 1 – William Pulgram, Austrian-American architect (d. 2020)
- January 3
  - John Russell, actor (d. 1991)
  - Cecil Souders, American football player (d. 2021)
- January 4 – Leo Sarkisian, musicologist, broadcaster (d. 2018)
- January 6 – Cary Middlecoff, golfer (d. 1998)
- January 9 – John Sperling, businessman, founded the University of Phoenix (d. 2014)
- January 10 – Rodger Ward, race car driver (d. 2004)
- January 11
  - Gory Guerrero, wrestler, father of Eddie Guerrero (d. 1990)
  - Juanita M. Kreps, government official and businesswoman (d. 2010)
  - Judith Leiber, Hungarian-American fashion designer, businesswoman (d. 2018)
- January 14 – Murray Bookchin, libertarian socialist (d. 2006)
- January 16 – Henry Sayler, politician (d. 2021)
- January 17 – Herb Ellis, American actor (d. 2018)
- January 19 – Patricia Highsmith, crime fiction writer (died 1995 in Switzerland)
- January 21 – Howard Unruh, spree killer (d. 2009)
- January 24 – Beatrice Mintz, biologist (d. 2022)
- January 27
  - Raymond E. Peet, admiral (d. 2021)
  - Donna Reed, actress (died 1986)
- January 29
  - Anthony George, television actor (died 2005)
  - Geraldine Pittman Woods, African American science administrator and promoter of community service (died 1999)
- January 31
  - Carol Channing, actress (died 2019)
  - Mario Lanza, tenor, actor (died 1959)
  - Anthony Lazzaro, university administrator (d. 2021)
- February 4 – Betty Friedan, feminist author (died 2006)
- February 8
  - Betsy Jochum, female baseball player (died 2025)
  - Lana Turner, actress (died 1995)
- February 11 – Lloyd Bentsen, U.S. Senator from Texas from 1971 to 1993 (died 2006)
- February 12
  - Don Bollweg, baseball player (died 1996)
  - Betty Jaynes, actress and singer (died 2018)
  - Henry Simon, Air Force general (died 2016)
- February 14
  - Hugh Downs, broadcaster, television host, news anchor, TV producer, author, game show host, and music composer (died 2020)
  - John Henry Waddell, artist (died 2019)
- February 15
  - Jefferson J. DeBlanc, World War II United States Marine Corps fighter ace (died 2007)
  - Martha Farkas Glaser, Hungarian-American civil rights activist, manager of jazz musician Erroll Garner (died 2014)
- February 17 – Duane Gish, biochemist and academic (died 2013)
- February 20 – Buddy Rogers, pro wrestler (died 1992)
- February 24 – Abe vigoda, actor (died 2016)
- February 26
  - Jacob W. Gruber, anthropologist, archaeologist, historian and educator (died 2019)
  - Betty Hutton, actress (died 2007)
  - Louis Roney, opera singer (died 2017)
- February 27 – Michael Fox, actor (died 1996)
- March 1 – Richard Wilbur, poet laureate (died 2017)
- March 2 – Cornelius Edward Gallagher, politician (died 2018)
- March 3 – Diana Barrymore, actress (died 1960)
- March 4 – Robert F. Ruth, politician (died 2018)
- March 5 – Berkley Bedell, politician (died 2019)
- March 11 – Frank Harary, mathematician (died 2005)
- March 12 – Gordon MacRae, singer and actor (died 1986)
- March 13 – Al Jaffee, cartoonist (MAD Magazine) (died 2023)
- March 16 – Donald M. Kendall, businessman (d. 2020)
- March 27 – Tom Bevill, U.S. Representative from Alabama from 1967 to 1997 (died 2005)
- March 30 – Clemens Kalischer, photojournalist, art photographer (died 2018)
- March 31 – Peggy Rea, television actress (died 2011)
- April 1
  - Beau Jack, boxer (died 2000)
  - Arthur "Guitar Boogie" Smith, musician and songwriter (died 2014)
- April 3
  - Robert Karvelas, actor (died 1991)
  - Jan Sterling, actress (died 2004)
- April 7 – Robina Asti, flight instructor and LGBT activist (died 2021)
- April 9
  - William G. Callow, judge (died 2018)
  - Mary Jackson, African-American mathematician and engineer (died 2005)
  - Frankie Thomas, actor (died 2006)
- April 10
  - Chuck Connors, basketball and baseball player turned actor (d. 1992)
  - Sheb Wooley, actor and singer (d. 2003)
- April 15 – Ken Potts, U.S. Navy sailor and World War II veteran (died 2023)
- April 20 – Kenneth O. Chilstrom, U.S. Air Force officer (died 2022)
- April 21 – John R. Huizenga, nuclear physicist (died 2014)
- April 23
  - Judy Agnew, Second Lady of the United States as wife of Spiro Agnew (died 2012)
  - Janet Blair, American actress (died 2007)
  - Warren Spahn, American baseball player (died 2003)
- May 1 – Boo Morcom, pole vaulter and jumper (died 2012)
- May 9
  - Daniel Berrigan, Jesuit priest, anti-war activist and poet (died 2016)
  - Mona Van Duyn, poet and academic (died 2004)
- May 23
  - James Blish, science fiction author (died 1975)
  - Laurin L. Henry, researcher (died 2025)
- May 20 – Hal Newhouser, baseball player (died 1998)
- May 25
  - Hal David, songwriter, lyricist (died 2012)
  - Kitty Kallen, singer (died 2016)
  - James C. Quayle, newspaper publisher (died 2000)
- May 30 – Leon Hale, journalist and author (died 2021)
- June 3 – John Shelton Wilder, politician, Lieutenant Governor of Tennessee (died 2010)
- June 7 – Dorothy Ruth Pirone, horse breeder and author (died 1989)
- June 9 – Forrest Bird, biomedical engineer (died 2015)
- June 10 – Jim Cullivan, American football coach (died 2024)
- June 13 – Nancy Warren, baseball pitcher (died 2001)
- June 15 – James Emanuel, African American poet and scholar (died 2013)
- June 17 – Tony Scott, jazz clarinetist (died 2007)
- June 19 – Howell Heflin, U.S. Senator from Alabama from 1979 to 1997 (died 2005)
- July 2 – William Proctor Wilson, businessman and philanthropist (died 2010)
- July 4
  - Madelon Mason, model and pin-up girl (died 2011)
  - Philip Rose, actor, playwright and theatrical producer (died 2011)
  - Galen L. Stone, diplomat (died 2018)
- July 5 – Al Kozar, second baseman (d. 2007)
- July 6
  - Billy and Bobby Mauch, twin actors (d. 2006) and (d. 2007)
  - Ed Erban, professional basketball player (d. 2008)
  - Nancy Reagan, born Anne Frances Robbins, First Lady of the United States and film actress (died 2016)
  - F. Michael Rogers, general (died 2014)
- July 7 – Johnny Van Cuyk, relief pitcher (died 2010)
- July 8 – Don Ray, basketball player (died 1998)
- July 9 – David C. Jones, U.S. General (died 2013)
- July 10
  - John K. Singlaub, U.S. Army Major General (died 2022)
  - Harvey Ball, designer (died 2001)
  - Eunice Kennedy Shriver, philanthropist, a member of the Kennedy family and the founder of Special Olympics (died 2009)
- July 12 – Brother Blue, African-American educator, storyteller, actor, musician and street performer (died 2009)
- July 15
  - Madge Meredith, actress (died 2017)
  - Robert Bruce Merrifield, chemist, Nobel Prize laureate (died 2006)
  - Carl Richardson, American football coach (died 2023)
  - Patricia Wright, actress
- July 16 – Bernard W. Rogers, United States Army general (died 2008)
- July 18
  - Aaron T. Beck, psychiatrist (died 2021)
  - John Glenn, first U.S. astronaut to orbit Earth and U.S. Senator from Ohio from 1974 to 1999 (died 2016)
- July 19 – Elizabeth Spencer, writer (died 2019)
- July 22
  - Jim Rivera, Major League Baseball (MLB) outfielder (died 2017)
  - Al LaMacchia, professional baseball player, scout (died 2010)
  - William Roth, U.S. Senator from Delaware from 1971 to 2001 (died 2003)
- July 24 – Billy Taylor, jazz musician (died 2010)
- July 25 – Marv Rackley, baseball player (died 2018)
- July 26 – Jean Shepherd, storyteller, radio and television personality (died 1999)
- August 3
  - Richard Adler, Broadway composer (died 2012)
  - Edward Tipper, World War II veteran (died 2017)
- August 4
  - Charles H. Coolidge, Medal of Honour recipient (died 2021)
  - Herb Ellis, jazz guitarist (died 2010)
- August 9
  - Ernest Angley, televangelist, author and station owner (died 2021)
  - J. James Exon, Governor of Nebraska, U.S. Senator (died 2005)
  - Patricia Marmont, actress (died 2020)
- August 10
  - Yuki Shimoda, actor (died 1981)
  - Jack B. Weinstein, federal judge (died 2021)
- August 11
  - Henry Graff, historian (died 2020)
  - Alex Haley, author (died 1992)
- August 13
  - Barney Liddell, musician (died 2003)
  - Jimmy McCracklin, pianist, singer-songwriter (died 2012)
- August 14
  - Audrey Geisel, second wife of Dr.Seuss and CEO of Dr. Seuss Enterprises (died 2018)
  - Sidney Rittenberg, journalist, consultant and author (died 2019)
- August 18 – Joe Caroff, graphic designer (died 2025)
- August 19 – Gene Roddenberry, television producer (died 1991)
- August 20 – Gloria Parker, musician and bandleader (died 2022)
- August 21
  - Lawrence Lindemer, politician (died 2020)
  - John Osteen, televangelist (died 1999)
- August 23 – Kenneth Arrow, economist, recipient of the Nobel Memorial Prize in Economic Sciences in 1972 (died 2017)
- August 24 – George W. Blair, politician (died 2020)
- August 25 – Henry Abraham, academic (died 2020)
- August 26
  - Ben Bradlee, newspaperman (died 2014)
  - Naomi Parker, war worker, probable model for the "We Can Do It!" poster (died 2018)
- August 29 – Iris Apfel, interior designer (died 2024)
- August 30 – David Finn, public relations executive (died 2021)
- September 2 – Josephine Lenard, professional baseball player (died 2007)
- September 3
  - Henry Bellmon, U.S. Senator from Oklahoma from 1969 to 1981 (died 2009)
  - Harry Landers, actor (died 2017)
- September 8 – Mosie Lister, singer (died 2015)
- September 11
  - George Joseph, businessman
  - Francis Quinn, Roman Catholic bishop (died 2019)
- September 12 – Frank McGee, television personality (died 1974)
- September 13
  - Lou Conter, naval officer (died 2024)
  - Odore Joseph Gendron, Roman Catholic, bishop (died 2020)
- September 17 – Roger H. Zion, politician (died 2019)
- September 19 – Morton Mandel, businessman (died 2019)
- September 22 – Robert I. Price, admiral (died 2019)
- September 27
  - John Malcolm Patterson, politician (died 2021)
  - Bernard Waber, American children's author (died 2013)
- October 3 – John H. Cushman, military officer (died 2017)
- October 5
  - Mahlon Hoagland, biochemist (died 2009)
  - Bill Willis, American football player (died 2007)
- October 6
  - Joseph Lowery, African-American minister, activist (died 2020)
  - Alex Wizbicki, American football player (died 2018)
- October 7
  - Richard L. Duchossois, businessman (died 2022)
  - Tommy Farrell, supporting actor and comedian (died 2004)
- October 11 – Shaw McCutcheon, cartoonist (died 2016)
- October 14 – Jeffrey G. Smith, general (died 2021)
- October 18
  - Jerry Cooke, photographer (died 2005)
  - Jesse Helms, U.S. Senator from North Carolina (died 2008)
- October 19
  - John William Ditter, Jr., federal judge (died 2019)
  - George Nader, actor (died 2002)
- October 21 – Victor A. McKusick, "father of genetic medicine" (died 2008)
- October 26
  - Frances Scott Fitzgerald, writer, daughter of F. Scott and Zelda Fitzgerald (d. 1986)
  - Joe Fulks, basketball player (d. 1976)
- October 27 – Warren Allen Smith, gay rights activist, writer and humanities humanist (died 2017)
- October 31 – Wendell Nedderman, American engineering educator (died 2019)
- November 3 – Charles Bronson, film actor (died 2003)
- November 6 – James Jones, novelist (died 1977)
- November 8
  - Walter Mirisch, film producer (died 2023)
  - Gene Saks, actor and film director (died 2015)
- November 10 – Owen Bush, actor (died 2001)
- November 11 – Molly Dodd, actress (died 1981)
- November 15
  - Jimmy Fitzmorris, politician and businessman (died 2021)
  - Alexander Jefferson, Air Force officer (died 2022)
- November 19 – Roy Campanella, African-American baseball player (died 1993)
- November 20 – Dan Frazer, actor (died 2011)
- November 22 – Rodney Dangerfield, born Jacob Rodney Cohen, comedian (died 2004)
- November 24
  - John Lindsay, lawyer, politician and Mayor of New York City (died 2000)
  - John P. Yates, politician (died 2017)
- November 29 – Jackie Stallone, born Jacqueline Labofish, astrologer, dancer, wrestling promoter and mother of Sylvester Stallone (died 2020)
- December 3
  - Phyllis Curtin, soprano (died 2016)
  - Ruby M. Rouss, WAC and first female president of the Virgin Islands Legislature (died 1988)
- December 4 – Sanford K. Moats, American Air Force general (died 2023)
- December 5
  - Alvy Moore, actor (died 1997)
  - Peter Hansen, actor (died 2017)
  - Eddie Platt, saxophonist (died 2010)
- December 6 – Otto Graham, American football player, in Waukegan, Illinois (died 2003)
- December 8 – Carl Corley, author and illustrator (died 2016)
- December 10 – John P. Fullam, judge (died 2018)
- December 14
  - Mike McCormack, politician (died 2020)
  - Charley Trippi, American football player (died 2022)
- December 21 – Robert Lipshutz, lawyer and politician, 17th White House Counsel (died 2010)
- December 26
  - Steve Allen, television host (died 2000)
  - Earle Basinsky, crime novelist (died 1963)
  - John Severin, comics artist (died 2012)

== Deaths ==
- January 20 – Mary Watson Whitney, astronomer (born 1847)
- February 7 – John J. Gardner, member of the House of Representatives from New Jersey from 1893 to 1913 (born 1845)
- February 17 – Rosetta Luce Gilchrist, physician and author (born 1850)
- March 8 – Thomas H. Paynter, U.S. Senator from Kentucky from 1907 to 1913 (born 1851)
- March 29
  - Levi Ankeny, U.S. Senator from Washington from 1903 to 1909 (born 1844)
  - John Burroughs, naturalist (born 1837)
- April 21 – Tom O'Brien, baseball player (born 1860)
- April 23 – John P. Young, managing editor of the San Francisco Chronicle (b. 1849)
- May 19 – Edward Douglass White, 9th Chief Justice of the United States from 1910 to 1921, Associate Justice of the Supreme Court from 1894 to 1910 and U.S. Senator from Louisiana from 1891 to 1894 (born 1845)
- May 26 – Donald Evans, poet, publisher, music critic and journalist (born 1884)
- June 12 – Murphy J. Foster, U.S. Senator from Louisiana from 1901 to 1913 (born 1849)
- June 16 – William E. Mason, U.S. Senator from Illinois from 1897 to 1903 (born 1850)
- July 24 – C. I. Scofield, theologian (born 1843)
- August 20 – Grace Carew Sheldon, journalist and businesswoman (born 1855)
- August 25 – Peter Cooper Hewitt, electrical engineer and inventor (born 1861)
- September 9 – Virginia Rappe, model and silent film actress (born 1891)
- October 12 – Philander C. Knox, United States Attorney General from 1901 to 1904 and United States Secretary of State from 1909 to 1913 (born 1853)
- October 25 – Bat Masterson, gunfighter (born 1853)
- October 31 – William Egan, gangster (born 1884)
- November 26 – Charles W. Whittlesey, United States Army officer, commander of the "Lost Battalion" in World War I (suicide) (born 1884)
- December 12 – Henrietta Swan Leavitt, astronomer (born 1868)
- December 28
  - Hester A. Benedict, president, Pacific Coast Women's Press Association (born 1821)
  - Thomas Walter Bickett, Governor of North Carolina (born 1869)
- December 31 – Boies Penrose, U.S. Senator from Pennsylvania (born 1860)
- Nat Love, African American cowboy (born 1854)

== See also ==
- List of American films of 1921
- Timeline of United States history (1900–1929)
