= George Blair =

George Blair may refer to:

- George Blair (American football) (born 1938), American football halfback
- George Blair (director) (1905–1970), American film director
- George Blair (ice hockey) (1929–2010), Canadian professional hockey player
- G. W. Scott Blair (1902–1987), British chemist
- George A. Blair (1915–2013), American businessman, entrepreneur, and waterskier
- George W. Blair (1921–2020), American politician and rancher
- George Young Blair (1826–1894), Scottish marine engineer
