= Mitchell S. Buck =

American poet, translator and classical scholar

Mitchell Starrett Buck (February 10, 1887 – May 12, 1959) was an American poet, translator and classical scholar. His volumes of verse and prose poetry were deeply influenced by 1890s aestheticism as well as classical Greek and Roman Literature. His work Syrinx: Pastels of Hellas, which was published by his friend Donald Evans on his Claire Marie Press in 1914, was praised by H.L. Mencken who remarked that Syrinx contained "a series of Grecian rhapsodies in rhythmic prose, many of them of considerable beauty." Buck also published prose works and a biography of Casanova.

== Bibliography ==
- Syrinx: Pastels of Hellas (1914)
- Ephemera: Greek Prose Poems (1916)
- Lucian's Dialogues of the Hetaerai (1916, as translator)
- The Songs of Phryne (1917)
- Book Repair and Restoration: A Manual of Practical Suggestions for Bibliophiles (1918)
- The Songs of Bilitis (1919, as translator)
- Afterglow: Pastels of Greek Egypt, 69 B.C (1924, with an introduction by Arthur Machen)
- The Life of Casanova from 1774 to 1798 (1924)
- Rose of Corinth (1929, decorations by Franz Felix)
- The Priapeia (1937, as translator)
