= Lou Conter =

American Navy lieutenant commander (1921–2024)

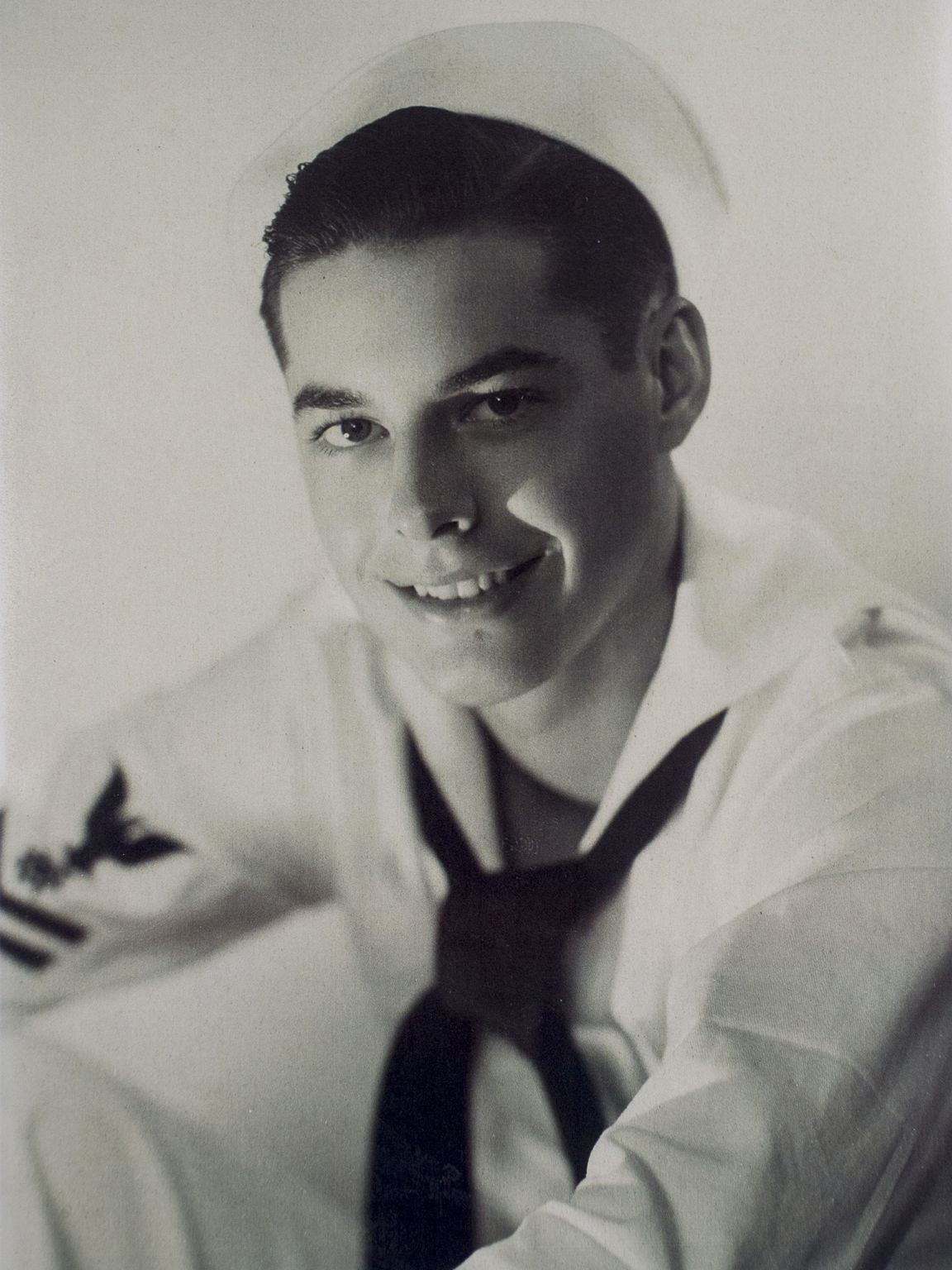
- Then QM2-Conter, c. 1941–42
- Born: Louis Anthony Conter; September 13, 1921; Ojibwa, Wisconsin, U.S.
- Died: April 1, 2024 (aged 102); Grass Valley, California, U.S.
- Military career
- Allegiance: United States
- Branch: United States Navy
- Service years: 1939–1967
- Rank: Lieutenant commander
- Units: USS Arizona (BB-39); USS Bon Homme Richard (CV-31); Patrol Squadron ELEVEN (VPB-11)
- Conflicts: World War II; Attack on Pearl Harbor; New Guinea campaign; European theater; Korean War

Louis Anthony Conter (September 13, 1921 – April 1, 2024) was an American naval officer who was a lieutenant commander and naval aviator in the United States Navy. He was the last living survivor of the sinking of the USS Arizona, destroyed during the attack on Pearl Harbor in 1941.

== Early life ==
Louis Anthony Conter was born in Ojibwa, Wisconsin, on September 13, 1921, to Nicholas Anthony Conter and Lottie Esther Milligan. Conter had one older and one younger sister. He and his family moved from Wisconsin to New Mexico in 1922, before moving again to Denver, Colorado, in 1924. Conter moved to Stockton, Kansas, in 1927 before returning to Denver in 1930, where he lived on a farm. Upon finishing school, Conter began working at the same company as his father.

== Military career ==
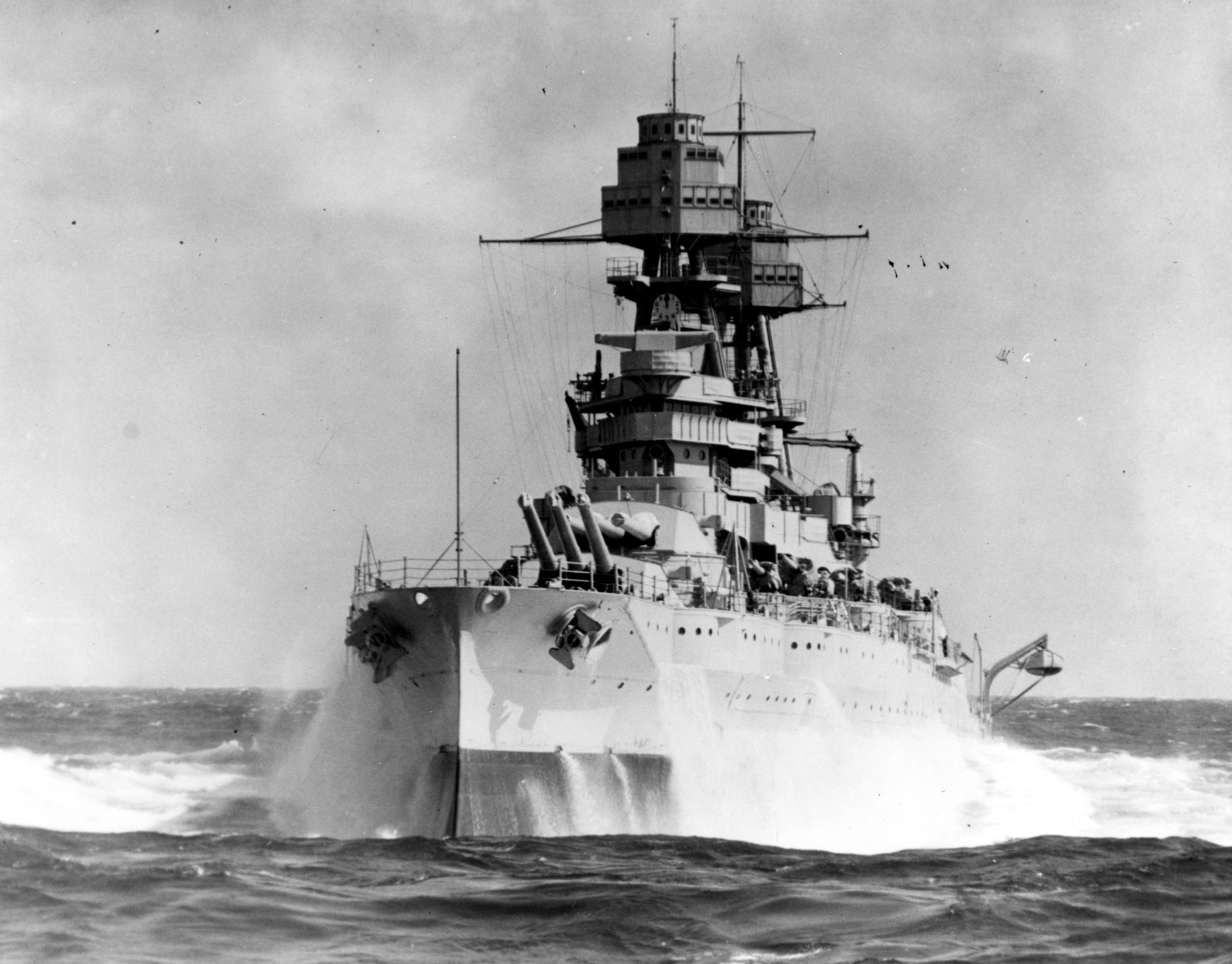
The Arizona during the 1930s.

Conter enlisted in the US Navy on November 15, 1939, in his home town of Denver, and completed basic training in San Diego, California. He boarded the USS Arizona on January 24, 1940, as a quartermaster.

=== Pearl Harbor ===
The USS Arizona returned to her base at Pearl Harbor on December 6, 1941. On the morning of December 7, Conter was on watch on the quarterdeck station between the third turret and main deck, when the ship was attacked by a squadron of Japanese torpedo planes and bombers at 8 am. About five minutes later, the Arizona was struck by a 1,760-pound (800 kg) bomb between the first and second turret, which ignited the ship's ammunition magazine. The following explosion blew off the ship's bow and lifted the battleship out of the water, knocking over Conter while killing and injuring many others. As the ship burned and started to sink, she was hit by more Japanese projectiles. Meanwhile, Conter was aiding wounded fellow sailors, keeping them from jumping in the burning oil covering the water's surface. When Conter was already knee deep in water, the order to abandon ship was given and Conter took to the lifeboats. The Arizona sank in nine minutes, taking the lives of 1,177 of her crew. Her 334 surviving crew struggled to escape the burning ruins, of which Conter saved several by pulling them out of the water into his lifeboat before rowing to shore. Following the attack, Conter spent several weeks helping to put out fires and recovering the bodies of the fallen.

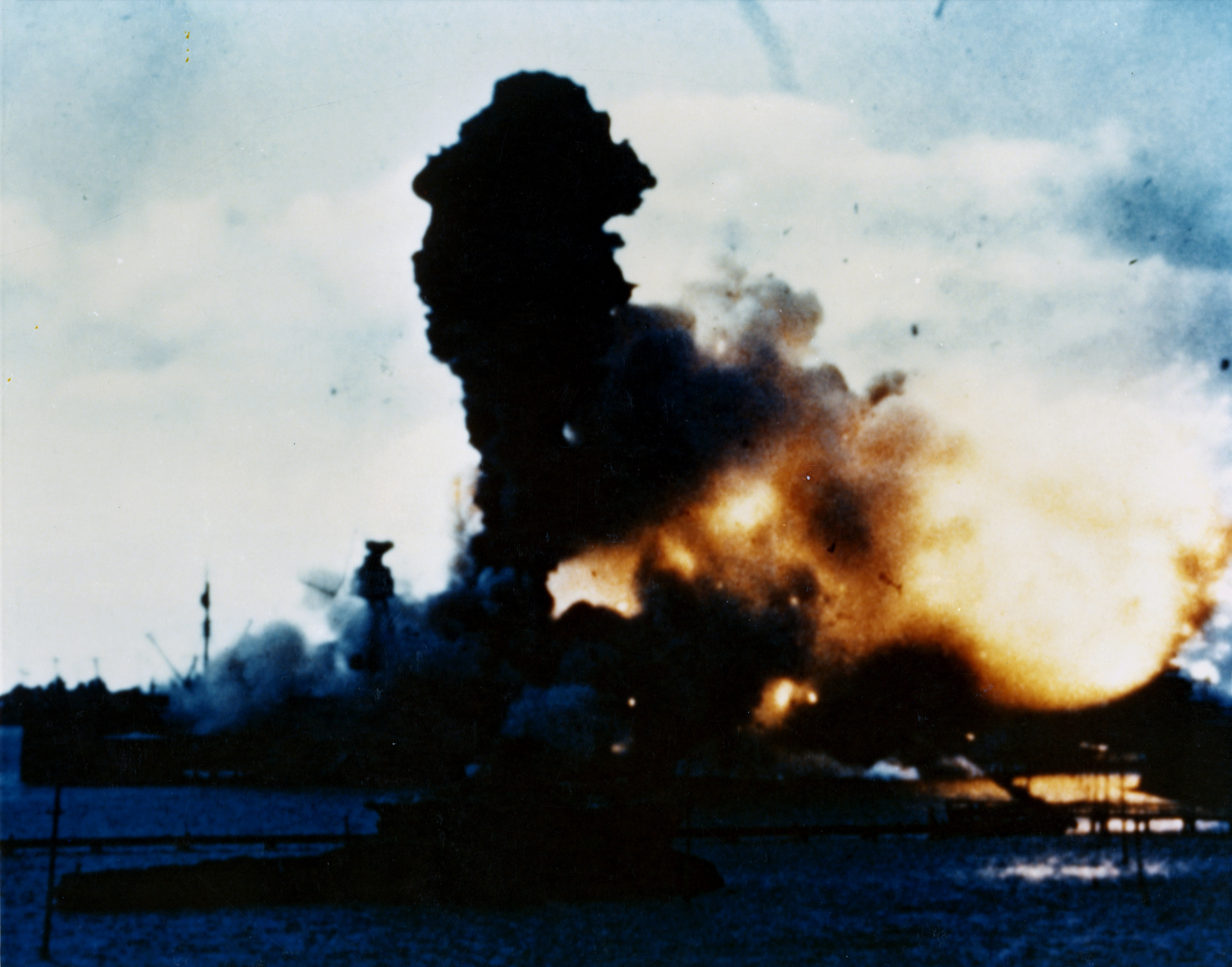
The Arizona's forward magazines explode in a still from a film made during the Japanese attack.

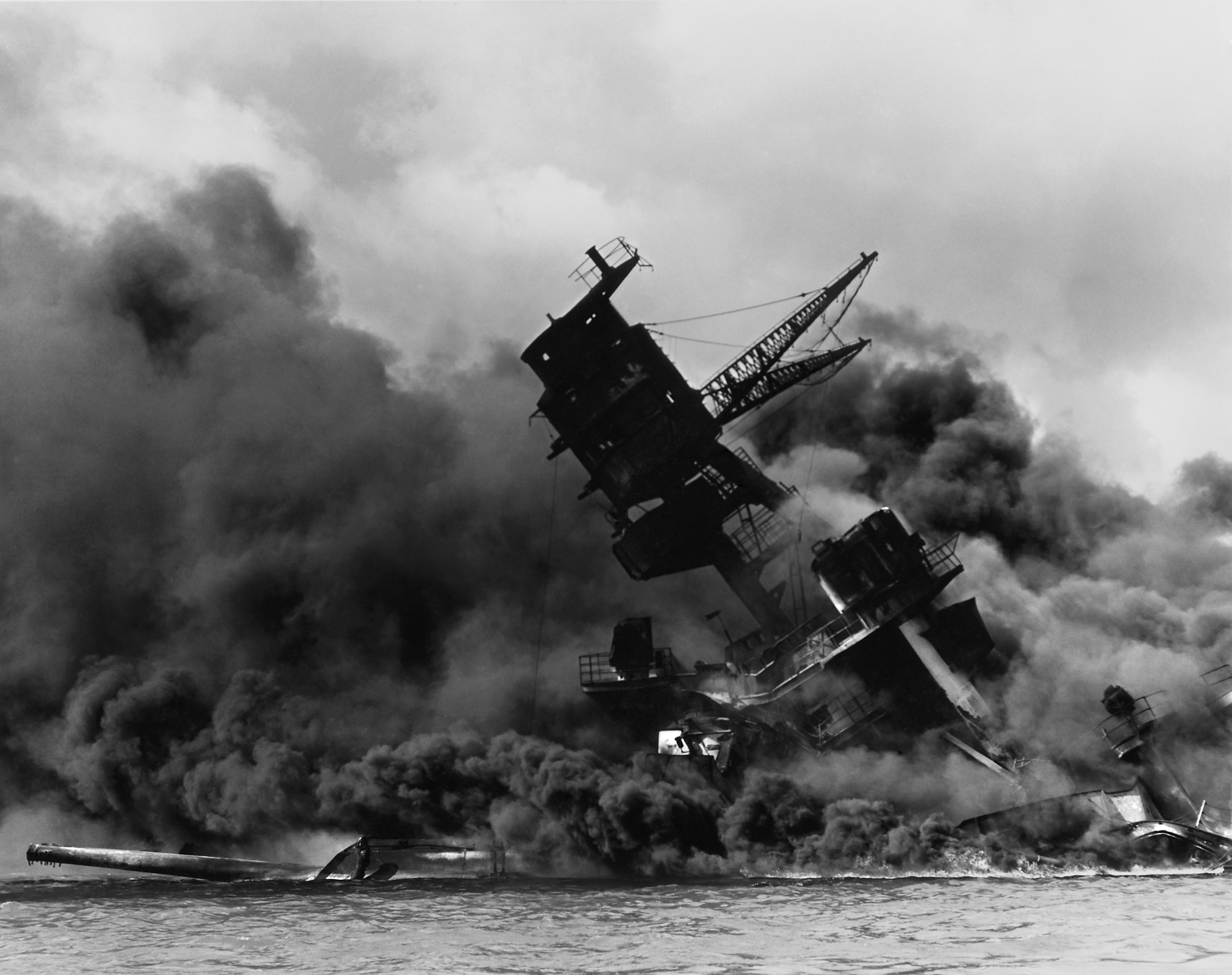
The Arizona burning after the Japanese attack

=== World War II ===
Following the entry of the United States into World War II as a direct result of the Attack on Pearl Harbor, Conter was selected for and entered naval flight training as a naval aviation cadet (NAVCAD). He qualified as an enlisted naval aviation pilot (NAP) in November 1942, participating in several nighttime bombing raids flying a PBY-5 variant, the Consolidated PBY Catalina with Patrol Squadron Eleven (VP-11), then known as Black Cats, in the South Pacific. He was shot down twice over the Pacific during his Navy flying career, but managed to use a raft to row to shore on both occasions. Later commissioned as an ensign, Conter went on to serve in the New Guinea campaign and in the European theater at the end of the war. During this time, he reached the rank of lieutenant and was a recipient of the Distinguished Flying Cross and the Navy Commendation Medal with Combat "V" device.

=== Post World War II ===
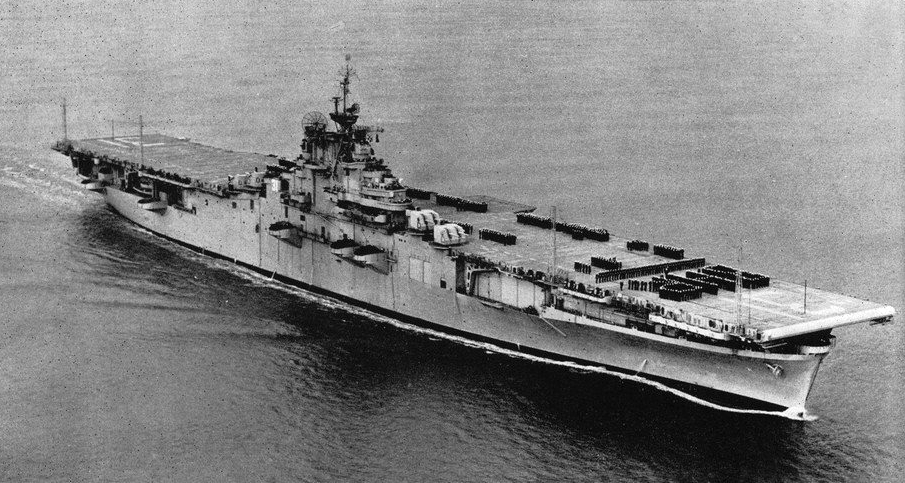
USS Bon Homme Richard in 1951.

Following the end of the war, Conter returned to California where he had completed his basic training back in 1939, and joined the Naval Reserve. Recalled to active duty during the Cold War, Conter saw action again during the Korean War in the 1950s, serving on the aircraft carrier USS Bon Homme Richard. Conter decided to remain on active duty and eventually retired from the Navy in December 1967, having achieved the rank of lieutenant commander.

== Awards ==
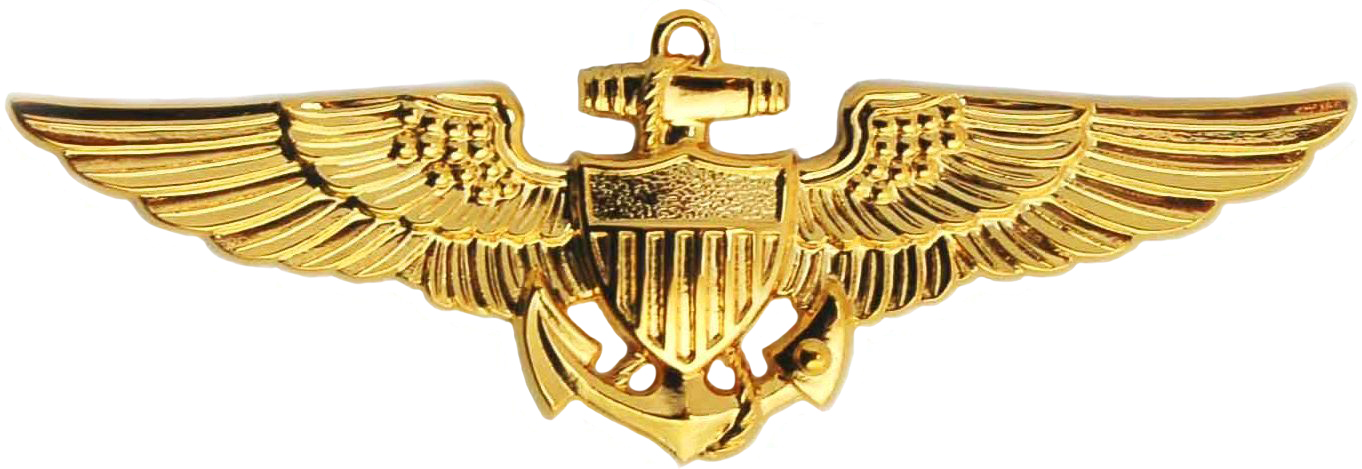

Naval Aviator Insignia
Distinguished Flying Cross (United States)		Navy Commendation Medal with Combat "V"
Combat Action Ribbon	Navy Presidential Unit Citation with one service star	Good Conduct Medal with one service star
China Service Medal	American Defense Service Medal with Combat "V" and one service star	American Campaign Medal
Asiatic-Pacific Campaign Medal with four battle stars	World War II Victory Medal	Navy Occupation Service Medal
National Defense Service Medal with one service star	Korean Service Medal	United Nations Korea Medal

== Later life ==
After his retirement from the Navy, Conter pursued a career as a real estate developer in California. Conter published a book about his life titled The Lou Conter Story in 2021; he turned 100 the same year. Conter was also a member of the Knights of Columbus. Following the death of Ken Potts in April 2023, Conter became the last known survivor of the sinking of the USS Arizona. He died from congestive heart failure at his home in Grass Valley, California, on April 1, 2024, at the age of 102.
