= Ojibwa (community), Wisconsin =

Ojibwa, Wisconsin
- Unincorporated community
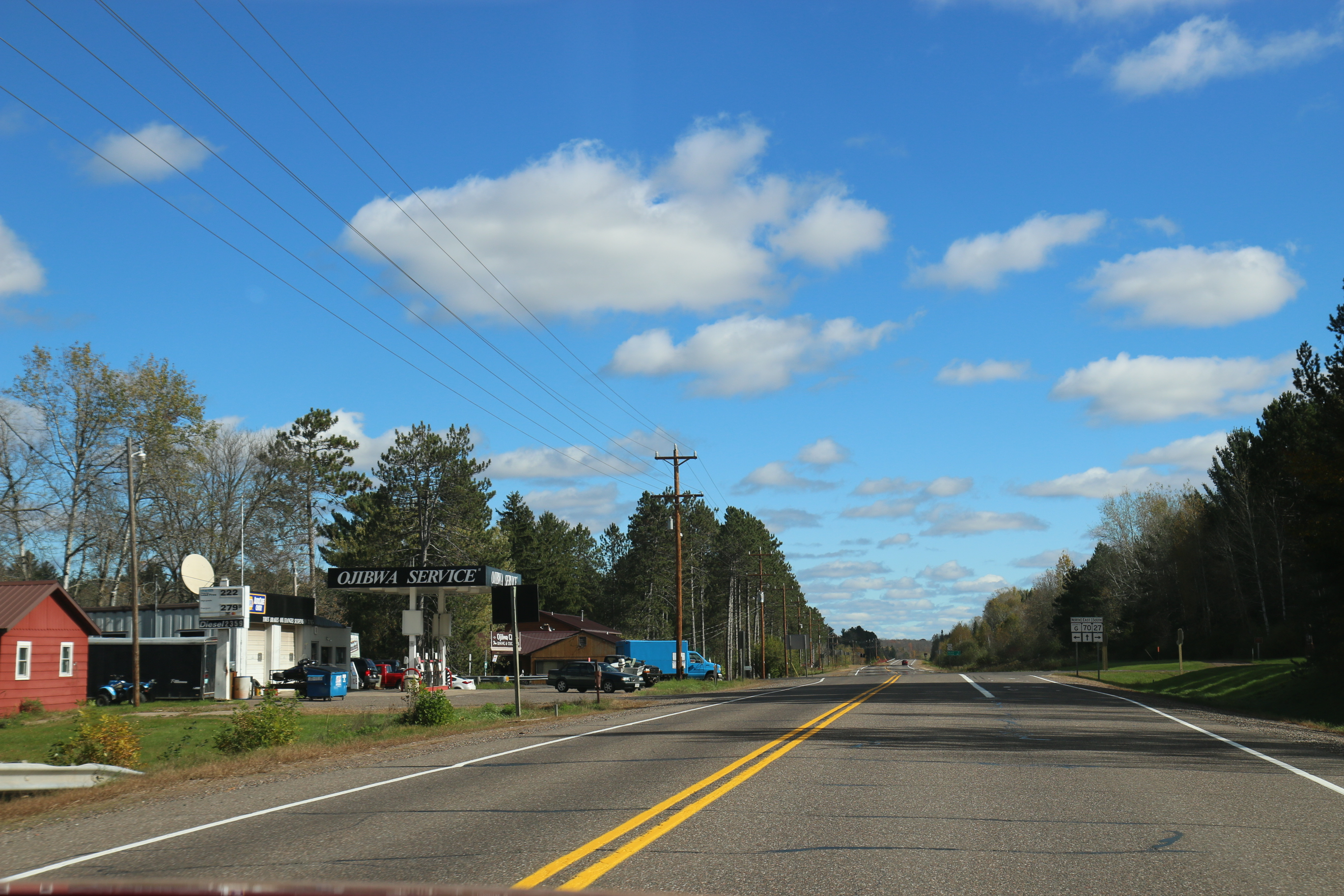
- The main intersection for Ojibwa on WIS27/WIS70

- Location within Wisconsin Location within the United States
- Coordinates: 45°47′53″N 91°07′01″W
- Country: United States
- State: Wisconsin
- County: Sawyer
- Elevation: 1,263 ft (385 m)
- Time zone: UTC-6 (Central (CST))
  - Summer (DST): UTC-5 (CDT)
- ZIP code: 54862
- Area codes: 715 & 534
- GNIS feature ID: 1570759

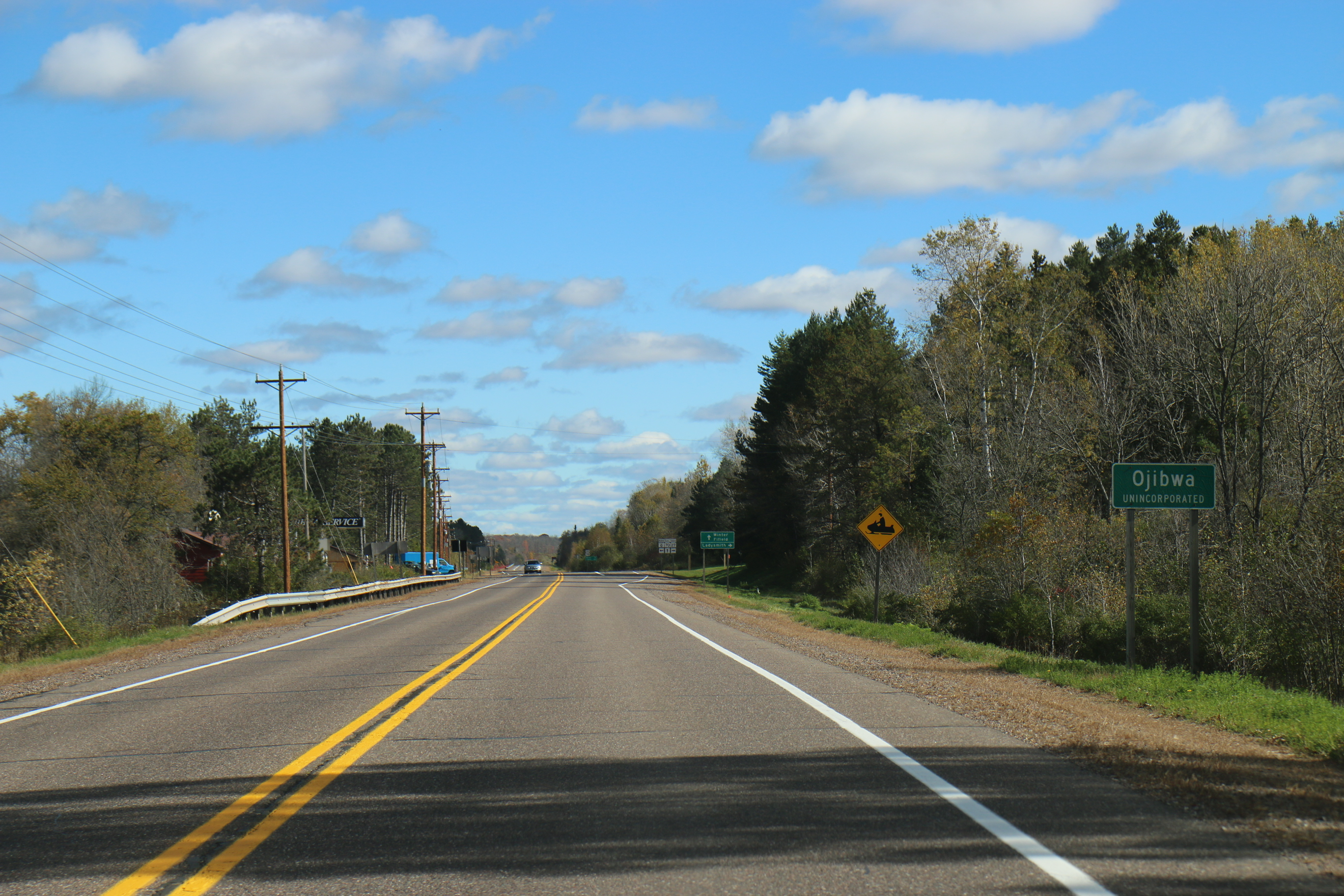
The sign Ojibwa, Wisconsin on WIS70 / WIS27

Ojibwa is an unincorporated community located in the town of Ojibwa, Sawyer County, Wisconsin, United States. Ojibwa is located on the Chippewa River at the junction of Wisconsin Highway 27 and Wisconsin Highway 70, 5.5 miles (8.9 km) east of Radisson and 5.5 miles (8.9 km) west-southwest of Winter. Ojibwa had a post office that closed on June 13, 1986.
