= Ojibwa, Wisconsin =

Ojibwa, Wisconsin Anishinaabe-oodena
- Town
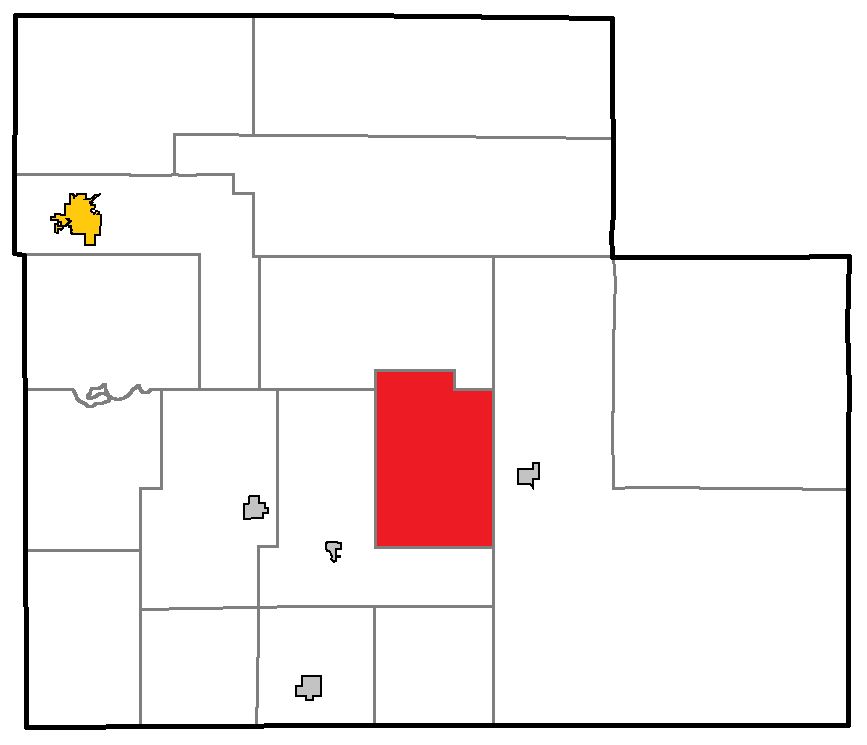
- Location of Ojibwa, within Sawyer County
- Coordinates: 45°48′30″N 91°7′6″W
- Country: United States
- State: Wisconsin
- County: Sawyer

Area
  - Total: 51.4 sq mi (133.2 km^{2})
  - Land: 50.8 sq mi (131.6 km^{2})
  - Water: 0.58 sq mi (1.5 km^{2})
- Elevation: 1,332 ft (406 m)

Population (2020)
  - Total: 307
  - Density: 6.04/sq mi (2.33/km^{2})
- Time zone: UTC-6 (Central (CST))
  - Summer (DST): UTC-5 (CDT)
- Area codes: 715 & 534
- FIPS code: 55-59600
- GNIS feature ID: 1583856

Ojibwa (Ojibwe: Anishinaabe-oodena) is a town in Sawyer County, Wisconsin, United States. The population was 307 at the 2020 census. The unincorporated community of Ojibwa is located in the town.

== Geography ==
According to the United States Census Bureau, the town has a total area of 51.4 square miles (133.2 km^{2}), of which 50.8 square miles (131.6 km^{2}) is land and 0.6 square mile (1.5 km^{2}) (1.13%) is water.

== Demographics ==
As of the census of 2000, there were 267 people, 110 households, and 83 families residing in the town. The population density was 5.3 people per square mile (2.0/km^{2}). There were 265 housing units at an average density of 5.2 per square mile (2.0/km^{2}). The racial makeup of the town was 96.63% White, 2.25% Native American, and 1.12% from two or more races. Hispanic or Latino of any race were 0.37% of the population.

There were 110 households, out of which 23.6% had children under the age of 18 living with them, 69.1% were married couples living together, 1.8% had a female householder with no husband present, and 24.5% were non-families. 21.8% of all households were made up of individuals, and 11.8% had someone living alone who was 65 years of age or older. The average household size was 2.43 and the average family size was 2.76.

In the town, the population was spread out, with 21.3% under the age of 18, 3.4% from 18 to 24, 25.1% from 25 to 44, 31.5% from 45 to 64, and 18.7% who were 65 years of age or older. The median age was 45 years. For every 100 females, there were 113.6 males. For every 100 females age 18 and over, there were 114.3 males.

The median income for a household in the town was $41,667, and the median income for a family was $43,750. Males had a median income of $26,563 versus $21,071 for females. The per capita income for the town was $16,889. About 6.5% of families and 7.1% of the population were below the poverty line, including 8.2% of those under the age of eighteen and none of those 65 or over.

== History ==
Ojibwa, like all Sawyer County settlements, enjoyed its heyday during the period from 1902 to 1920. The community is located on the banks of the Chippewa River at a site that is now the junction of Highways 27 and 70. The town was named ‘Ojibwa’ by Mr. Ben F. Faast, an early real estate promoter, because of the nearness of the Chippewa River and the Lac Courte Oreilles reservation.

This hamlet was strategically located between the timber tracts of four large lumber companies — the Couderay Lumber Company to the north, the Hines Lumber Company to the east, the Chippewa Lumber and Boom Company to the south, and the Arpin Lumber Company to the west.

The Chippewa Lumber and Boom Company transported its logs to the Chippewa River by the way of the Brunet and Chippewa rivers. The Arpin Lumber Company maintained a large logging camp at the present location of McDonald Park and floated its logs down the Chippewa River. The Hines Lumber Company loaded its logs on railroad cars and shipped them to Park Falls. A spur line extended north to the holdings of the Couderay Lumber Company camps. Remains of the old Crooked Rapids Spur can still be seen from Highway 70 just west of the Albert Skogen farm. The northern end of the old right-of-way is used today by the Wisconsin Conservation Department as a fire lane. The Couderay Lumber Company shipped its logs by rail to sawmills at Couderay and Rice Lake. The logging industry was short-lived in the Ojibwa area, the major operation being shifted to Radisson and Winter.

Mr. Ben Faast of Eau Claire organized the Wisconsin Colonization Company and purchased large tracts of cut-over land south of Ojibwa. The office was located in Radisson and was moved to Ojibwa in 1918. (?) Mr. Faast had visions of a prosperous city that would be supported by farmers who would be anxious to develop modern farms where the loggers had left slashings in their hasty operations to make quick profits. The land was advertised as unusually fertile and very cheap. The method of sale is described in the chapter about Radisson.

So firmly did Mr. Faast believe in his scheme that he personally planned the organization and layout of the community. Frans Aust, a professor at the University of Wisconsin, drew the plans for the village. The plan was complete and ideal and provided for a zoo, a park, a boulevard, street and sidewalk planning, a residential zone, and a manufacturing zone. The result was only moderate success since the buyers of the farmlands found that profits in farming were small and that too much time, capital, and hard work were necessary to attain the success to which they had aspired.

A variety of nationalities settled in the vicinity of Ojibwa; such as the Scandinavians, Polish, English, French, German and Irish. The largest ethnic group which settled in the area was the Polish. They were industrious, ambitious, thrifty, and honest people, who tilled the soil in the summer and worked in the logging camps in the winter. The wives and children remained on the farms in the wintertime and tended the cattle, while the husband and father was away at work to supplement the farm income. Slowly and reluctantly, one by one, the families deserted the farms and returned to the cities to resume work in factories.

Of the original group of Polish families who came to the town of Ojibwa, there are only four remaining; the Jarosz family, the Granica family, the Pydo family and the Karpowicz family.

The first church in Ojibwa was the Lutheran Church. An old schoolhouse, the Crawford School, was moved from a site near the airport to the village in the winter of 1922. This building was moved down the river on the ice, the last time the Chippewa River has been completely frozen over so that it could be used as a thoroughfare for teams and vehicles.

The congregation dissolved about 1925 and the building was moved to the settlement known as “Thornapple”, where it was used as a community hall.

The area around Ojibwa was organized as a civil township in 1918 and was made up of lands detached from the Radisson Township. The first annual election held in the newly created township of Ojibwa was held on July 2, 1919, at the Al Raynor farm. There were a total of nine ballots cast. As there were only eight offices to fill, there was only one elector who was not honored by election to an office. Mr. Henry LeBeau, who was the town clerk of Radisson, was present and gave the oath of office to the newly elected officials.

The total assessed valuation of the new township was $286,048. In 1957, the total assessed valuation is $263,746.

Since the settlement of Ojibwa four school districts were established. The first school was the Menwaring School at Chappel Creek; the second was the Sam Sigwin School; the third was the Bishop School at Bishop Bridge, and the fourth was the state Graded School in the village. The district reorganized in 1952 and is now integrated with the Winter, Draper and Ojibwa School District. The school is no longer operating and the pupils are transported by bus to Winter.

A park, known as the Ojibwa Roadside State Park, is located in the township on the south side of the Chippewa River on Highway 70. It consists of three hundred fifty acres of heavily wooded land which attracts many tourists. There are many outdoor accommodations, such as, picnic tables, fireplaces, baseball diamond, shelter house, well, campsites, and hiking trails. In the wintertime, it is used as a feeding station for deer. The entire area is a wildlife refuge and many species of birds and animals inhabit the park. During the summer between five thousand and six thousand people visit the park to enjoy nature. From May to September an average of three thousand tourists camp on the grounds.
