= Jeffrey G. Smith =

U.S. military officer (1921–2021)

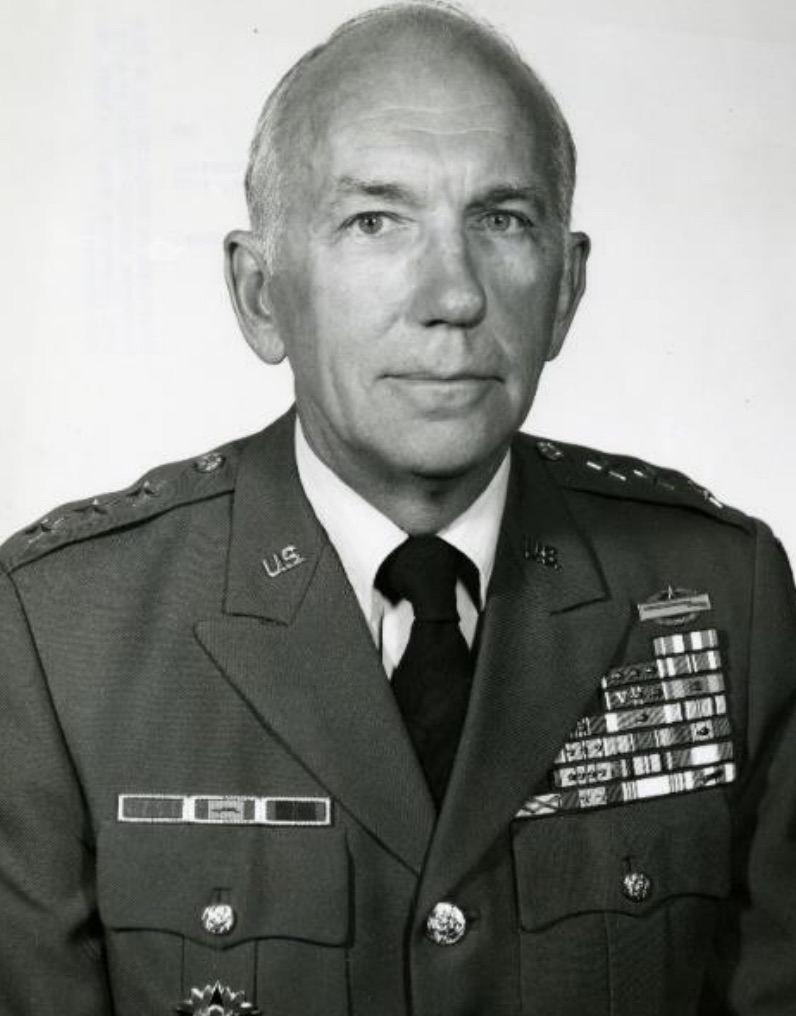
- Born: October 14, 1921; Fort Sam Houston, Texas, U.S.
- Died: March 21, 2021 (aged 99); Fort Belvoir, Virginia, U.S.
- Military career
- Allegiance: United States
- Branch: United States Army
- Service years: 1944–1979
- Rank: Lieutenant general
- Commands: First United States Army; 2nd Infantry Division; 2d Brigade, 3rd Armored Division; 2d Armored Infantry Battalion, 54th Infantry Regiment
- Conflicts: World War II; Vietnam War
- Awards: Silver Star; Legion of Merit (4); Distinguished Flying Cross; Bronze Star Medal (3)

Jeffrey Greenwood Smith (October 14, 1921 – March 21, 2021) was a lieutenant general in the United States Army. He was a member of the Virginia Military Institute (VMI) Class of 1943. He also served as Commandant of VMI in the 1960s. As a lieutenant general, he was Commander of the First United States Army from 1975 to 1979. He died in March 2021 in Fort Belvoir, Virginia at the age of 99.
