= Ken Potts =

American war veteran (1921–2023)

Howard Kenton "Ken" Potts
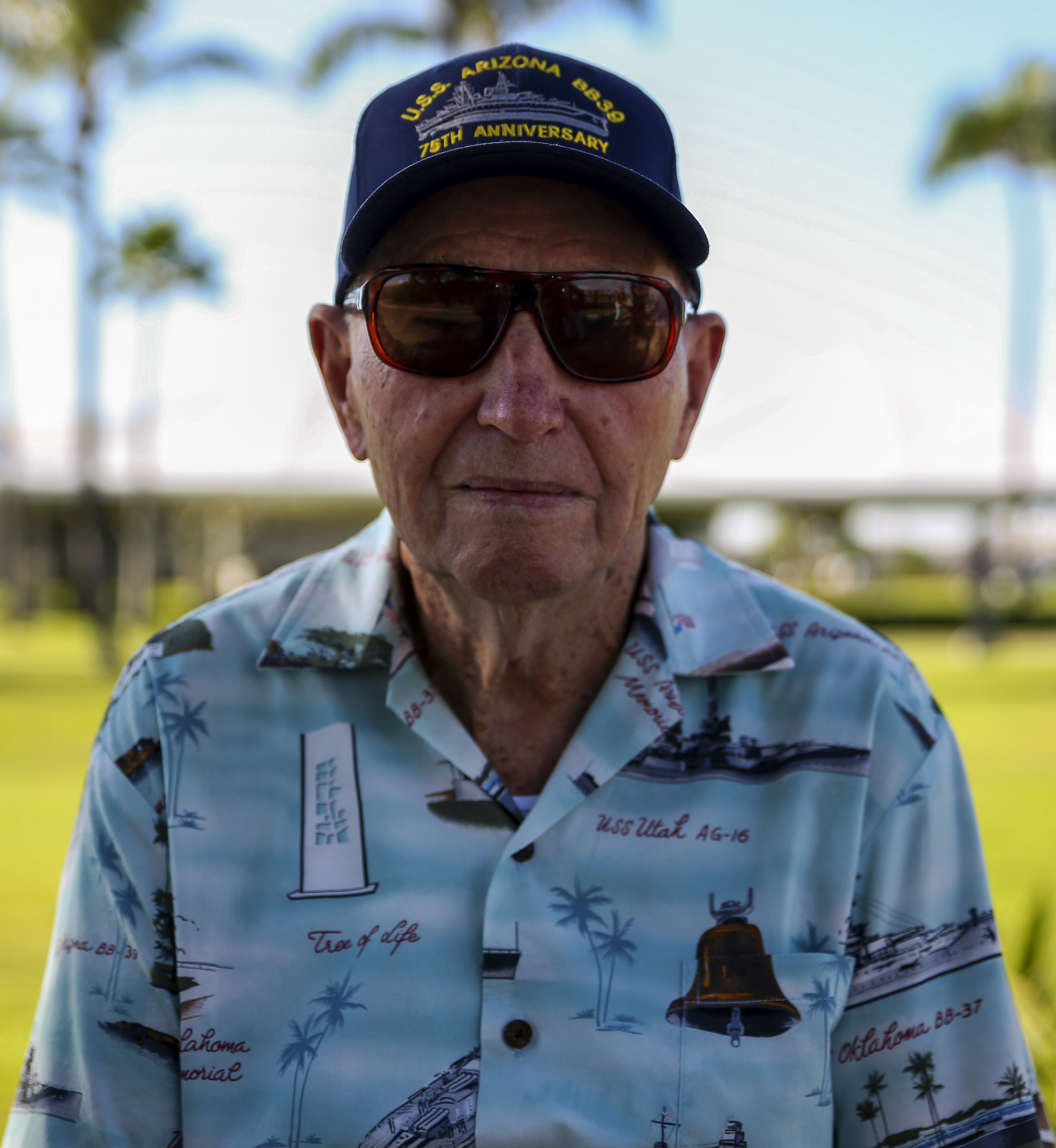
- Nickname: Ken Potts
- Born: Howard Kenton Potts; April 15, 1921; Honey Bend, Illinois, U.S.
- Died: April 21, 2023 (aged 102) Provo, Utah, U.S.
- Branch: Navy
- Service years: 1939–1945
- Rank: Boatswain's mate first class
- Known for: Second to last known survivor of the attack of the USS Arizona
- Conflicts: World War II; Pearl Harbor

Howard Kenton Potts (April 15, 1921 – April 21, 2023) was an American World War II veteran, who was aboard the USS Arizona BB-39 when it was attacked on December 7, 1941. Prior to his death, Potts was one of two known surviving members of the Arizona′s crew at the time of the attack.

== Life ==
=== Navy ===
Potts was born on a farm in Honey Bend, Illinois. On October 4, 1939, the 18-year-old enlisted into the U.S. Navy, and was assigned to the USS Arizona on December 31, 1939, as a crane operator. Potts was on the USS Arizona when, at 8:00 am on December 7, 1941, the ship was attacked by Japanese aircraft. Potts helped pull men from the water, and took them to shore on Ford Island:

My best day in the Navy is when I survived December 7th, 1941; it was also my worst day. When the officer gave the command to abandon ship, some went hand-over-hand on those lines to Ford Island and others swam, the fact that Ford Island was there, saved a lot of lives. All the guns and ammunition were locked up when we were in port. I learned one thing on Dec. 7: a gun is no good without ammunition and you can't do much fighting. When I was on Ford Island, I found a Colt .45 pistol and I carried it with me until the end of the war.

— Ken Potts, 2014

Later on after the attack, Potts was assigned to the Port Director's Office. He was discharged as Boatswain's mate first class from the Navy following the end of the Second World War in 1945.

=== Personal life and death ===
After his discharge from the Navy, he returned to Illinois to work as a carpenter, building homes in Decatur, Illinois and Denver, Colorado. In the following years, Potts moved to Provo, Utah in 1946. In 1957, he married Doris, to whom he would remain married until his death. For the remainder of his life, he worked as an auto salesman.

Potts became a centenarian on April 15, 2021.

Potts died on April 21, 2023, at the age of 102. He was the penultimate USS Arizona survivor and flags were flown at half-mast through April 28 to honor him at the Pearl Harbor memorial. The last survivor, Lou Conter, died on April 1, 2024.
