= Anthony Lazzaro (university administrator) =

American academic administrator (1921–2021)

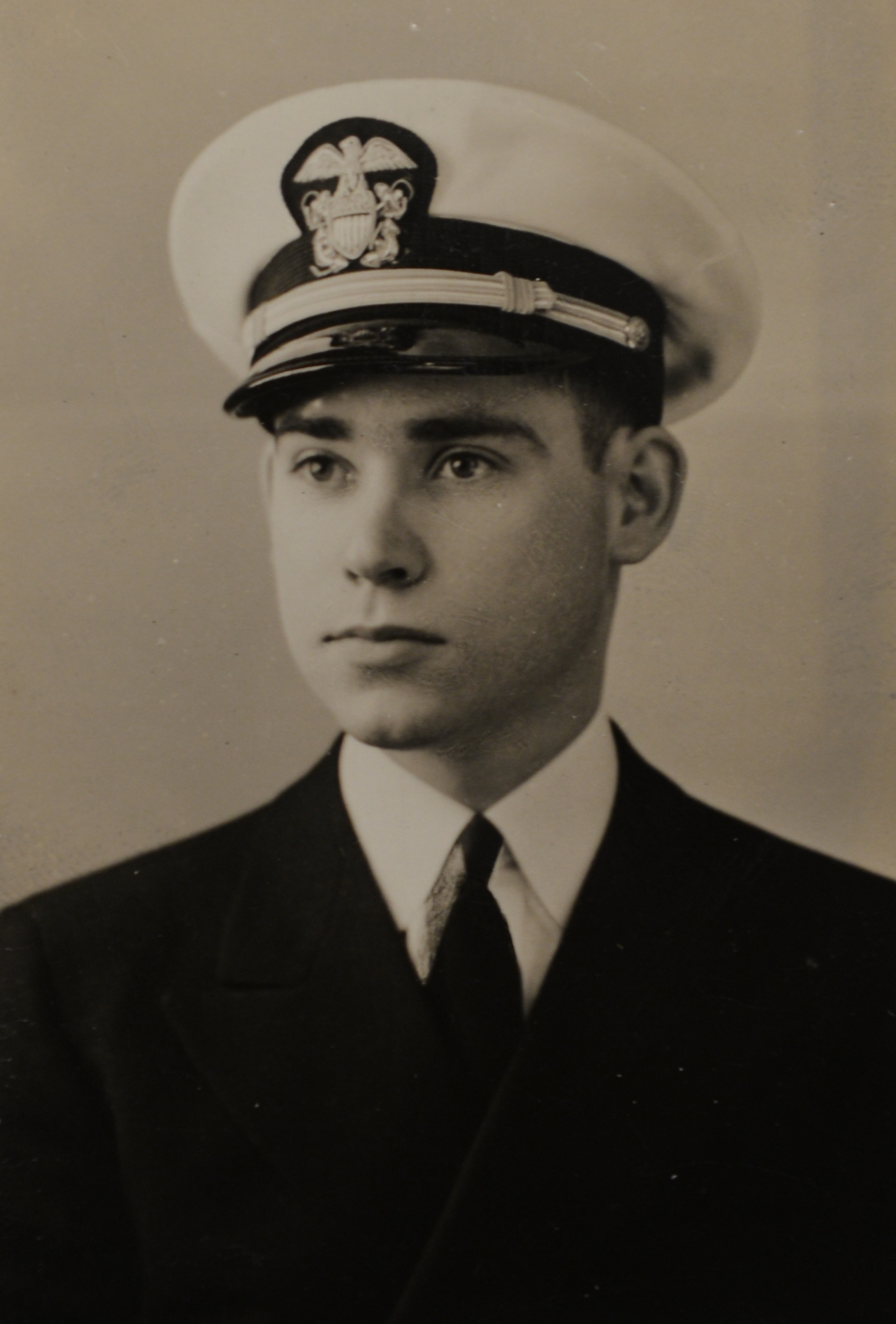
- Lazzaro in 1941
- Born: January 31, 1921; Utica, New York, U.S.
- Died: May 20, 2021 (aged 100); Palos Verdes Estates, California, U.S.
- Education: University of Southern California (BS)
- Spouse: Shirley Jones (m. 1941; died 1995)
- Children: 1
- Military career
- Branch: United States Navy
- Battles / wars: World War II

Anthony Lazzaro (January 31, 1921 – May 20, 2021) was an American academic administrator. He was vice president of the University of Southern California (USC) from 1988 until his retirement in 1991, having served the institution in a variety of administrative roles from 1948. He is credited with having expanded the campus infrastructure of USC from 11 permanent buildings to over 132 buildings, and for planning the construction of venues for the 1984 Summer Olympics in Los Angeles.

== Early life and education ==
Lazzaro was born in Utica, New York, on January 31, 1921. His parents immigrated to the United States from Italy. As a young man, he was employed by Western Union, but quit after declining to change his surname at the behest of his boss. Following the start of World War II and the attack on Pearl Harbor, Lazzaro was called to active U.S. Navy duty shortly after graduating from the New York Maritime College. He served in the Pacific theater aboard the attack transport USS DuPage (APA-41) and troop transport USS General John Pope (AP-110), eventually becoming chief engineer of his ship. While aboard the DuPage, he survived a kamikaze attack on January 10, 1945, that killed 35 men. He was subsequently discharged as a lieutenant and moved to Los Angeles, California, where he married Shirley Jones, his high school sweetheart.

Using G.I. Bill funding, he enrolled at the University of Southern California, earning a degree in industrial engineering.

== Career ==
=== University of Southern California ===
Lazzaro began working for USC shortly after graduating in 1948. He had been recommended by the dean of engineering and hired by vice president Robert D. Fisher. After serving initially as assistant business manager and superintendent of buildings and grounds, Lazzaro was appointed associate business manager and director of campus development in 1960, associate vice president for business affairs in 1971, vice president in 1972, senior vice president for business affairs in January 1986, and finally university vice president and special adviser to the president in 1988. During his career, he helped guide the university during a period of rapid development that paralleled the increasing size and prominence of the surrounding City of Los Angeles. He retired in 1991, but continued to serve as an official adviser and consultant to the university's senior leadership until the 2010s. He was recognized by USC with the official title of senior vice president emeritus.

At various times during his career at USC, Lazzaro's areas of responsibility included the present-day divisions of capital construction, facilities management, auxiliary services, career and protective services, and compliance, among others. Additional areas he led include campus master planning, the ticket office, real estate, the bookstore, transportation, licensing, student housing, campus security, and risk management.

While serving as a business manager and later vice president for business affairs, Lazzaro applied lessons learned as an engineering officer in the U.S. Navy, mandating an organized and economized approach to the administration of the university's physical plant and business operations. He was paraphrased in the Los Angeles Times as saying that "No one can change a light bulb on the USC campus without a work order and maintenance workers must account for each one-tenth of an hour's time."

=== Development of USC's campuses ===
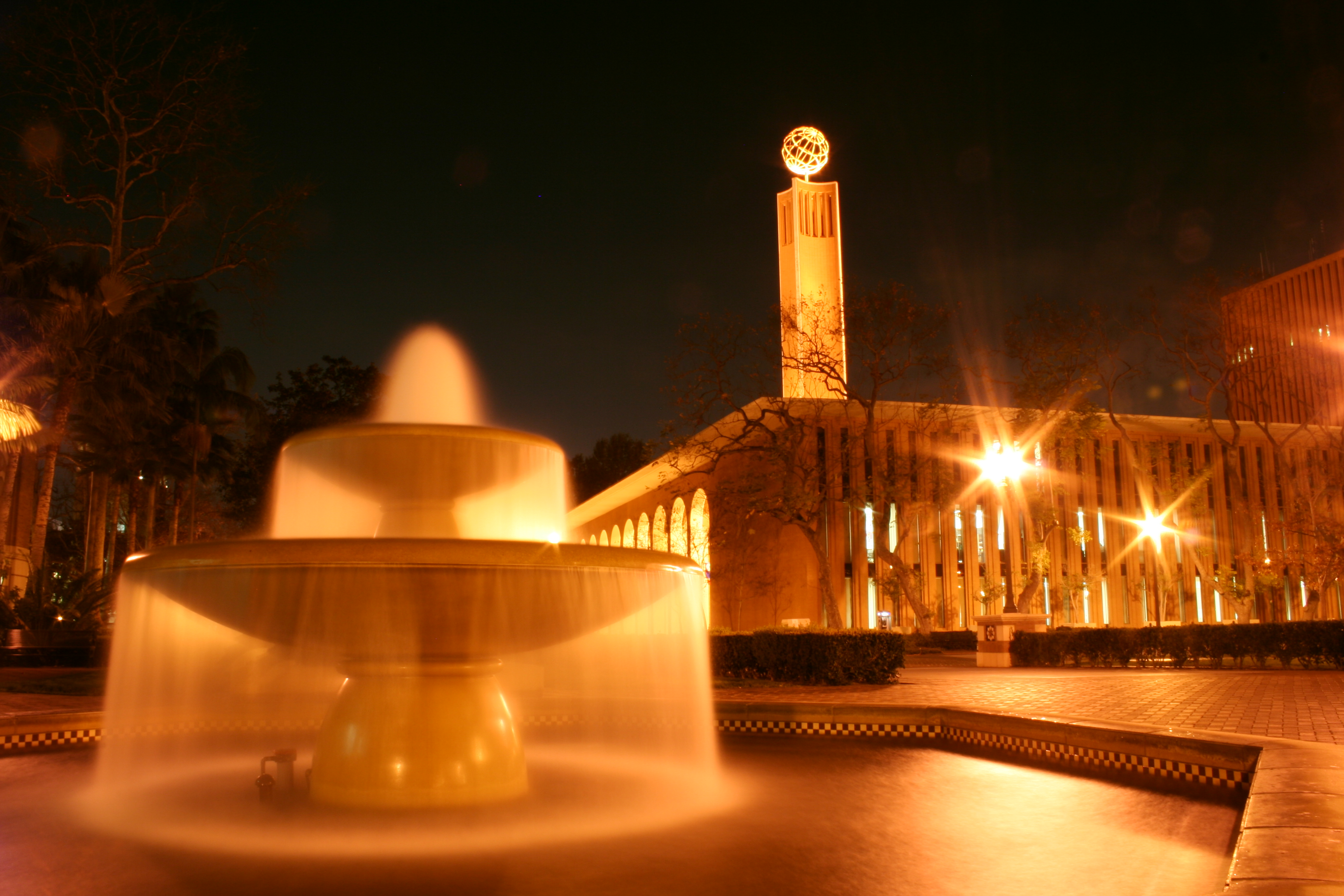
Fountain outside of Doheny Library with the Von KleinSmid Center and Globe illuminated celebrating USC's 125th anniversary

As a senior leader of the campus master plan team, Lazzaro was principally responsible for the construction of 132 buildings on USC's campuses and oversaw landscaping that transformed city streets into walkways and pedestrian malls. USC President James H. Zumberge said in 1987: "Anthony Lazzaro virtually built the USC we know today...No single individual has had more impact on the development of this university." Prior to this development, USC's campus had largely consisted of several neo-Renaissance buildings surrounded by city streets and 27 donated U.S. Army barracks buildings which had been converted for classroom, office, and housing space by the university.

Lazzaro was personally responsible for one of USC's most iconic features, the placement of a globe atop The Center for International and Public Affairs. He had seen a similar globe during a visit to New York (built for the 1964 World Fair) and decided that the globe would be a perfect reflection of USC's increasing importance in a global world, as well as Von KleinSmid's desire to have a distinctive memorial for his legacy. The globe was suggested to architect Edward Durell Stone who added it to the final design.

Also during Lazzaro's tenure as chief of capital construction, USC acquired and established its Health Sciences Campus, with the first of USC's academic research and clinical care buildings built around the existing County-USC Medical Center north of Downtown Los Angeles (then called the County General Hospital).

=== Liaison for the university ===
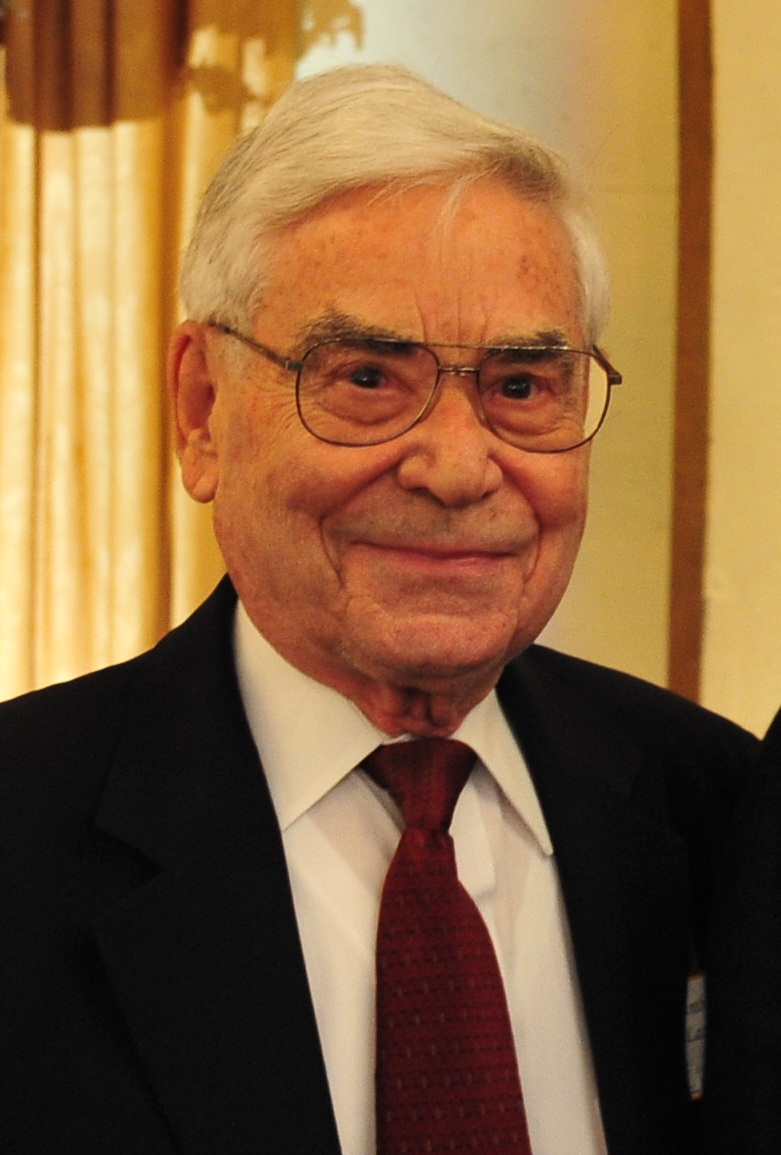
Lazzaro in 2011

As the university liaison to the Olympic organizing committee, Lazzaro played a key role in the planning of the 1984 Summer Olympic Games in Los Angeles, working closely with committee chairman Peter Ueberroth. One of Lazzaro's primary contributions was to help in the design and planning of the Olympic Village and the construction of facilities including the McDonald's Swim Stadium. When President Ronald Reagan opened the games, he used Lazzaro's office as a temporary staging area.

During the 1960s through the 1980s, Lazzaro was USC's senior officer responsible for dialog with the Community Redevelopment Agency in the university's district. He oversaw and negotiated agreements with the CRA and community leaders who were often concerned that USC's growth would affect local housing and job opportunities.

For much of his career at USC, Lazzaro was also responsible for the university's relationship with the nearby Los Angeles Memorial Coliseum, where USC's football team has played games for decades. As USC's representative, he worked to harmonize various forces, including the expectations of NFL teams, the need to update the stadium periodically, and USC's commitment to students, alumni, and other ticket holders.

== Professional recognition ==
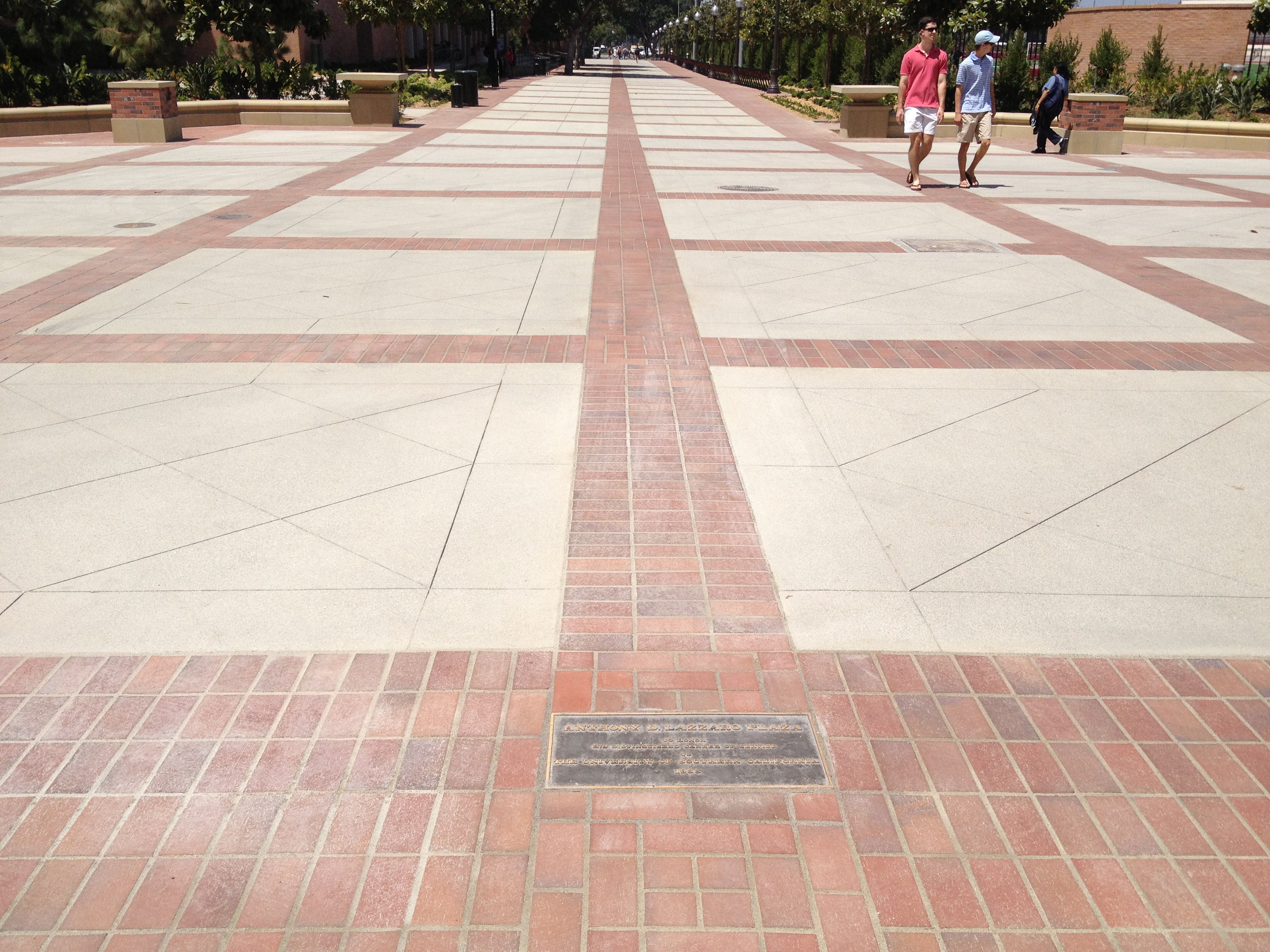
Anthony D. Lazzaro Plaza, with a major renovation nearing completion in August 2013. The renovation included the addition of lighting, benches, a new surface, and additional landscaping.

Lazzaro was the co-recipient of the Meritorious Service Award by the APPA (known as the National Association of Physical Plant Administrators of Universities and Colleges at the time) in 1963. He served as president of the Western Association of College and University Business Officers in 1972 and as president of the National Association of College and University Business Officers (NACUBO) in 1978.

Lazzaro received a special honor in December 1988, when USC trustee Raymond Watt made a donation on behalf of Lazzaro. As a result, Anthony D. Lazzaro Plaza was designated by the USC Board of Trustees and was dedicated with a ceremony on the University Park campus to acknowledge Lazzaro's commitment and distinguished career of service to the university. The plaza underwent a major renovation in 2013.

Lazzaro was conferred the Fred B. Olds Award in 2007. The award was presented on special occasions to USC alumni for their extraordinary and unparalleled service to the university over a long period of time. He ultimately worked in some capacity for USC for over six decades, and advised seven of USC's eleven presidents.

== Personal life ==
Lazzaro was married to Shirley Jones until her death in 1995. Together, they had one child, Nancy, who worked at USC as an Italian Literature Professor. His grandson, Derek Anthony Lazzaro, also worked as the Chief Information Officer at USC's Information Sciences Institute. Lazzaro died on May 20, 2021, at his home in Palos Verdes Estates, California. He was 100, and died of natural causes.
