= William Pulgram =

Austrian-born American architect (1921–2020)

William Leopold Pulgram (January 1, 1921 – April 16, 2020) was an Austrian-born American architect.

Pulgram, a Holocaust survivor, began his career in the late 1940s, drawing concrete details and wall sections as he worked on construction documents at Finch Alexander. As his career progressed, he began to specialize in corporate interiors, as a number of interior designers did. This esteemed group includes Davis Allen, Florence Knoll, Margaret McCurry, and Margo Grant Walsh. Pulgram's philosophy was that interior design is a continuation of the architecture of the space and needs to be carefully designed and contracted for; he was an advocate for architecture firms moving into the area of commercial interiors. In 1963, he created his own firm – Associated Space Design. The focus of his firm was interiors – he was known for his corporate environments including Coca-Cola and Black & Decker. His book, Designing the Automated Office, focused on how technology was changing the office environment and the need to develop strategies in design to incorporate equipment in the workplace. Pulgram believed in a holistic approach to office design. Balancing physical requirements to meet human needs with aesthetic ambience to stimulate human aspirations was his focus. Pulgram believed well designed interior spaces must be practical and effective, personal, efficient as a tool to achieve productive activity, dynamic to provide for effective communications and interactions, and flexible to accommodate for future changes. He worked tirelessly throughout his career to create interior contract documents – which are still used today. He was considered an expert in workplace design by the end of his career.

== Early life ==
William Pulgram was born on January 1, 1921, in Vienna, Austria to Sigmund Pulgram (tailor and manager of a fine clothing store) and Giselle Bauer Pulgram. He had two siblings, a younger sister, Lilli, and older brother, Ernst. William and his family lived a comfortable life which was disrupted by the Nazi invasion of Vienna. In 1939 he narrowly escaped being sent to a concentration camp and fled to England with the aid of a group of Quakers. He was in England for a year and a half, some of which was spent in an Internment camp, before receiving his papers allowing him to come to the United States and join his brother, Ernst. His father, Sigmund, mother, Giselle, and sister, Lilli all died while being held at Auschwitz.

By the time that William arrived in the United States, his brother, Ernst, had already made it to America and served in the United States Army until he was released on medical leave. Upon arrival, William got a job in Atlanta, GA at a department store named Davison-Paxon. By 1943, Pulgram decided to enlist in the Army to help fight against the Nazi regime. Initially, he was rejected because he was not a United States Citizen. He then had to write letters to military leadership declaring that he volunteered to be drafted into the military. That petition was accepted and he joined the Army, participating in special services entertainment by playing the piano. He served for three years ending in 1946. He served in Atlanta, GA and Los Angeles, CA.

== Education ==
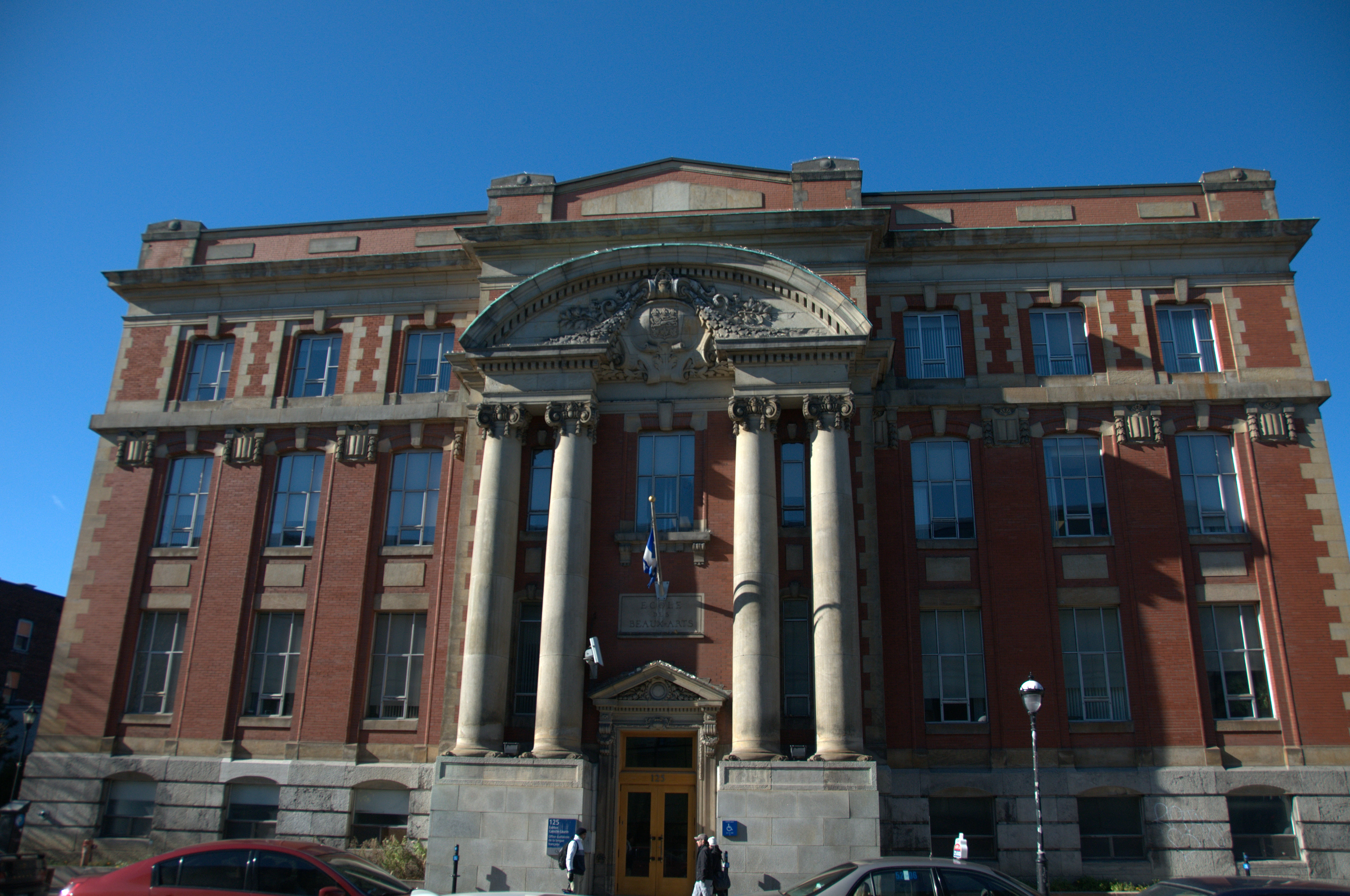
Ecole Des Beaux Arts by Serge Melki.

In 1946, Pulgram attended Georgia Institute of Technology at twenty five years old, and graduated with a Bachelor of Architecture degree in 1950. The G.I. Bill aided him in his educational pursuits. The G.I. Bill was a program created by the government which rewarded WWII veterans. One of the rewards was financial coverage in the veteran's pursuit of education. Over two million veterans attended college under this program. This led to logistical problems with overcrowding at universities, but students did not mind, and were grateful for the opportunity to learn. Pulgram was one of these students. He later continued his education at Ecole des Beaux Arts in Paris, France.

== Career ==
Pulgram joined the firm Cecil Finch Alexander in Atlanta where he began working on creating contract documents for the firm's interior projects. There, he created a subsidiary firm of Finch Alexander Rothschild and Pascal, focusing on interiors. Pulgram then left and began his own firm, Associated Space Design (ASD), for the design of interior spaces in 1963. His firm focused on the development of notable corporate environments such as Southern Bell, Coca-Cola, Black & Decker, and many others. ASD Projects also include banks, public institutions, and government buildings. Pulgram's firm worked to ensure that it responded to the needs of the employees as well as their automated working tools. He believed that interiors were important continuations of the exterior architecture. Before his death Pulgram was the chairman emeritus of ASD. He spent time consulting internationally on architecture and facility planning with an emphasis on effects of the information based society. Today, ASD is one of the largest interior design firms in the country. It offers complete design services, including product and graphic design.

== The AIA Documents Committee ==
In 1972, Pulgram was the chair of a taskforce for the AIA Documents Committee, which was responsible for developing interiors contract documents. This committee was full of members of the AIA (American Institute of Architects) and ASID (American Society of Interior Designers). In 1975, he became the Chairman for the AIA's pioneering Interiors Committee. The committee developed contract documents and started publishing information on subjects including starting a practice, identifying differences between interior design and architecture practices, developing client relationships, and how to obtain new work. The Interiors Committee has grown from only 50 members at its conception to nearly 1,500 members today.

== Book ==
In 1984, Pulgram and Richard Stonis wrote the book, Designing the Automated Office, which focuses on the need to plan for new technologies in offices. Their book discusses how the design community must educate itself on office technology and how it will affect the way offices work. They believed there were six factors: flexibility, human factors, project team, spacing planning, building systems, and furnishings that affect the design of the automated office. Programming for machines becomes necessary as well as the design and layout of workstations to focus on the productivity and comfort of the worker. The book contains workstation suggestions and different desk set ups for different task jobs. The book addresses different office layouts and the effect on communication between employees. They also discuss electricity, how lighting affects people and costs, acoustics and its effects on people/privacy, as well as wall assemblies and new furniture technology. Their book won the Designer's book club of the month award and was later translated into Japanese.

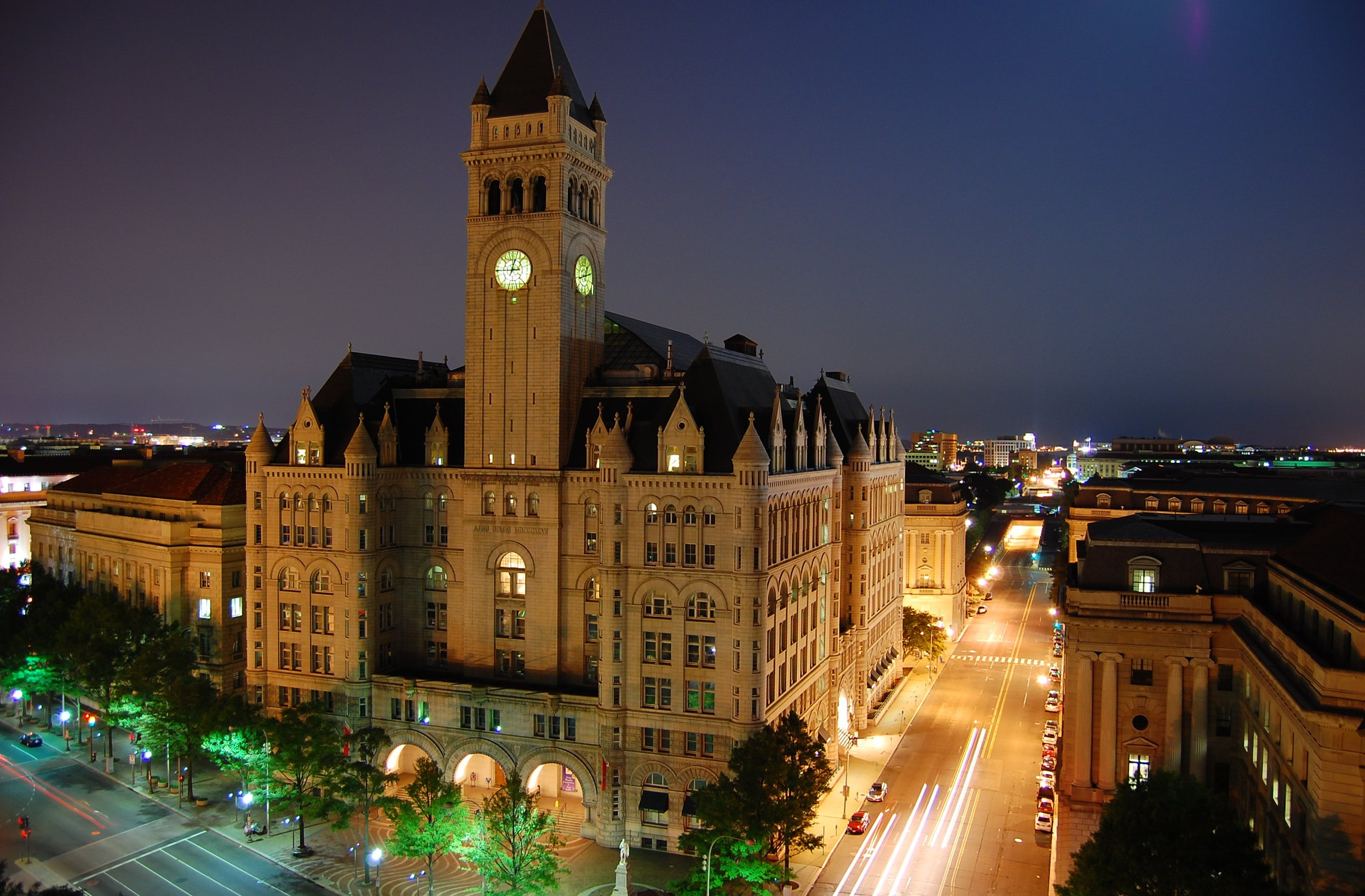
The Old Post Office in Washington D.C. by Wyn Van Devanter

== Projects ==
- Alma Desk showroom in Atlanta, Georgia. Associated Space Design created a space where each showroom had a different perception of the community. The spaces created doubled as offices for the showroom staff.
- McDonald's Oak Brook headquarters An Interiors project where Pulgram removed the desks, and replaced them with TRM's that hold telephones, drawing boards, and typewriters. There were few doors or walls, the space was separated by TRMs and cabinets. He created a ‘think tank’ where a hidden door led visitors to a small arena with a waterbed in the floor to relax and take time to take care of their minds, creating a space where they could be creative. The space was created with irregular shapes and padded walls.
- The Huff-Feldman House Built in 1953, remodeled in 1955,1958 and again once it was purchased by the Feldman's and restored by Margaret Gilchrist Serro and interior designer Herbert Brito in 2000. It is 3,000 square feet and one of only five houses designed by Pulgram.
- Atlanta–Fulton County Stadium 1965. William Pulgram and his firm designed this project as a joint-venture team of FABRAP (Finch Alexander Barnes Rothschild & Paschal) and Heery, Inc.
- First National Bank Mid-1960s. Designed with Emory Roth and Sons of New York, it was a design to replace the Ten Eyck Brown's Peachtree Arcade (1916–17).
- TRM (task response module) System. 1970. Eppinger Furniture, INC used the TRM system in their office planning. TRMs are similar to wall units in homes used to hold decorations, books, and stereos. A TRM is able to hold any necessary item while also allowing the occupant to add items to make them feel more comfortable.
- Tampa Electric Company in Tampa, Florida. 1979. Atrium overlooking offices.
- Old Post Office in Washington, D.C. 1979. An adaptive restoration, the first project of its type in the U.S. government. Completed as part of the Pennsylvania Avenue Redevelopment Project.
- Headquarters of the Coca-Cola Company 1970, 1979, 1981.
- Southern Bell (later BellSouth) 1980. The latter with Skidmore Owings and Merrill of New York.
- Hurt Building Redevelopment in Atlanta, Georgia. 1985. Ground floor arcade and art gallery.

== Awards ==
He was a Fellow of the American Institute of Architects and a member of the American Society of Interior Designers, The National Committee on Interiors, the Architectural Research Council, the Atlanta Arts Association, and the AIA Foundation. Pulgram was awarded first prize for design while attending Ecole Des Beaux Arts.

== Personal life ==
William met his wife Lucia Walker Fairlie while attending Georgia Institute of Technology and they were married 68 years (1952–2020). They had four children: Christopher, Anthony, Laurence, and Deirdre. Christopher is first violinist with the Atlanta Symphony Orchestra, Anthony was an opera singer with the New York City Opera and now lectures at Columbia University, Laurence works as an attorney in San Francisco, and Deirdre is the executive director of the EarthSpirit Community.

William Pulgram died in April 2020 at the age of 99. His wife Lucia preceded him in death by 70 days.
