= Robert I. Price =

American vice admiral (1921–2019)

- Born: September 22, 1921; New York City, New York, U.S.
- Died: October 20, 2019 (aged 98)
- Allegiance: United States of America
- Branch: United States Coast Guard
- Service years: 1945–1981
- Rank: Vice admiral
- Awards: Legion of Merit (2 awards)

Robert Ira Price (September 22, 1921 – October 20, 2019) was a United States Coast Guard vice admiral. He graduated from the United States Coast Guard Academy in 1945. He served as Commander of the Coast Guard Atlantic Area and Third Coast Guard District. Price was awarded the Legion of Merit and a gold star in lieu of a second award of the medal for his service. He died October 20, 2019, aged 98.
