= Sweetest Day =

Holiday

- Observed by: Great Lakes region
- Type: Local
- Celebrations: Giving presents such as greeting cards and candy to loved ones.
- Date: Third Saturday in October
- 2025 date: October 18
- 2026 date: October 17
- 2027 date: October 16
- 2028 date: October 21
- Frequency: Annual

Sweetest Day is a holiday that is celebrated in the Midwestern United States, in parts of the Northeastern United States, in Arizona, and in Florida on the third Saturday in October. It is a day to share romantic deeds or expressions, and acts of charity and kindness. Sweetest Day has also been referred to as a "Hallmark holiday" or a "concocted promotion" created by the candy industry solely to increase sales of sweets.

== Origin ==
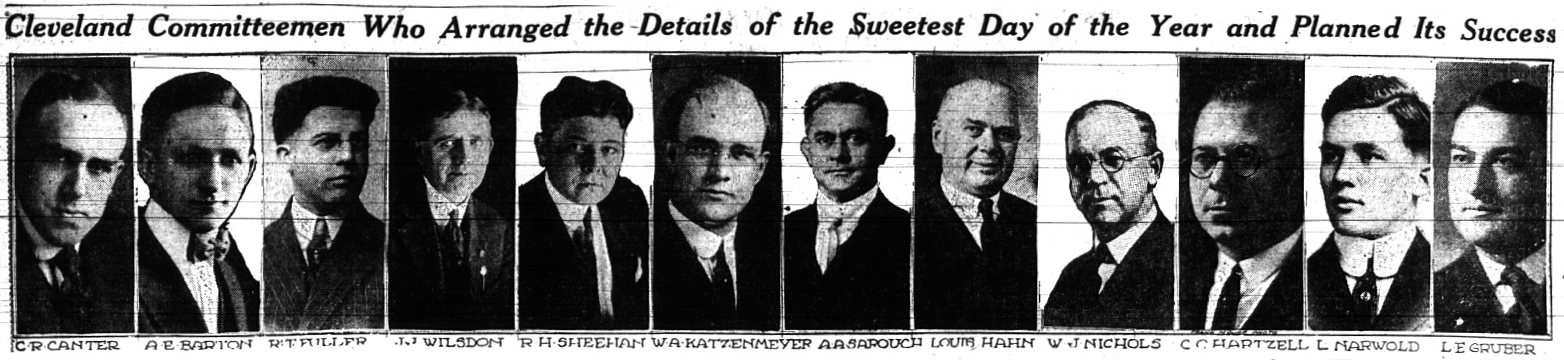
The 12 Cleveland committeemen who planned Cleveland's Sweetest Day, as published in The Cleveland Plain Dealer on October 8, 1922.

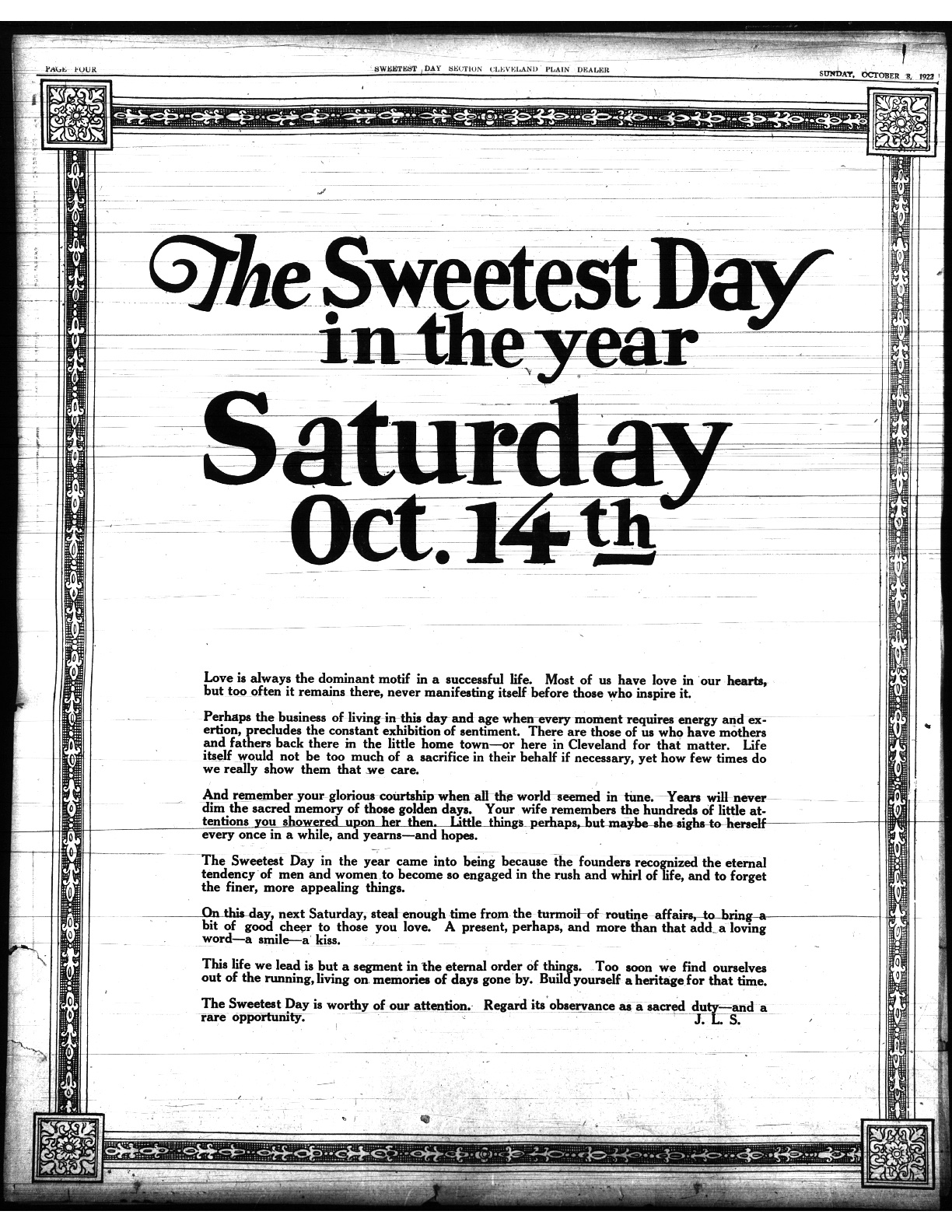
Full page Sweetest Day editorial published in The Cleveland Plain Dealer on October 8, 1922.

The first Sweetest Day was observed on October 10, 1921, in Cleveland. The Cleveland Plain Dealer's edition of October 8, 1922, which chronicles the first Sweetest Day in Cleveland, states that the first Sweetest Day was planned by a committee of 12 confectioners chaired by candymaker C. C. Hartzell. The Sweetest Day in the Year Committee distributed over 20,000 boxes of candy to "newsboys, orphans, old folks, and the poor" in Cleveland. The Sweetest Day in the Year Committee was assisted in the distribution of candy by some of the biggest movie stars of the day including Theda Bara and Ann Pennington.

There were also several attempts to start a "Sweetest Day" in New York City, including a declaration of a Candy Day throughout the United States by candy manufacturers on October 8, 1922. In 1927, The New York Times reported that "the powers that determine the nomenclature of the weeks of October" decreed that the week beginning on October 10, 1927, would be known as Sweetest Week. On September 25, 1937, The New York Times reported under Advertising News and Notes that The National Confectioners Association had launched a "movement throughout the candy industry" to rank Sweetest Day with the nationally accepted Mother's Day, Father's Day, and St. Valentine's Day.

In 1940, another Sweetest Day was proclaimed on October 19. The promotional event was marked by the distribution of more than 10,000 boxes of candy by the Sweetest Day Committee. The candy was distributed among 26 local charities. 225 children were given candy in the chapel at the Society for Prevention of Cruelty to Children on October 17, 1940. 600 boxes of candy were also delivered to the presidents of the Jewish, Protestant and Catholic Big Sister groups of New York.

== Regional importance ==
Retail Confectioners International describes the observance as "much more important for candymakers in some regions than in others (Detroit and Cleveland being the biggest Sweetest Day cities)". The popularity in Detroit was greatly perpetuated by the Sanders Candy Company. Frederick Sanders was a large promoter of the holiday. In 2006, Hallmark marketed 151 greeting card designs for Sweetest Day. American Greetings marketed 178.

Sweetest Day observance is still most prevalent in the Great Lakes region, where the holiday originated, including Illinois, Indiana, Michigan, Ohio, and Wisconsin. According to Hallmark, "the once-regional celebration of Sweetest Day has spread throughout the country." In addition to those states where it is "most prevalent", Sweetest Day is celebrated by communities in Arizona, California, Florida, Kentucky, Maryland, Missouri, New York, North Dakota, Pennsylvania, South Dakota, Texas, Washington, and West Virginia, bringing the total to 17 states.

== Criticism ==
Sweetest Day was thought to be invented for commercial interests which stood to profit from such a holiday, critics refer to it as a "Hallmark holiday" (although it was not invented by the Hallmark Cards company). Its actual history is often overlooked and many believe it to be another commercial holiday.
