= William Proctor Wilson =

American businessman-philanthropist (1921–2010)

- Born: July 2, 1921; New York City, U.S.
- Died: March 7, 2010 (aged 88); Honolulu, Hawaii, U.S.
- Resting place: Maui, Hawaii, Warren, Rhode Island
- Occupation: Businessman
- Spouse(s): Mildred Annette Smith, Marie Muraro Titone, Leona Rocha
- Children: 2

William Proctor Wilson (July 2, 1921 – March 7, 2010) was CEO of The Butterick Publishing Company. As President and CEO, Wilson led one of the first leveraged buyouts of the 1980s when a Butterick management group headed by Bill Wilson and John Lehmann purchased the company from American Can. The buyout was $12.5 million, of which all but $500,000 was borrowed. Wilson grew up the middle of three children born to Trevett Abbot Wilson of Warren, Rhode Island and Jesse Proctor of New York. He descended from a long line of influential figures in Rhode Island history, Roger Williams, Nathan Miller, Joel Abbot, and Thomas G. Turner.

He was married to Mildred Annette Smith for many years with whom he had two daughters. They divorced in 1976. Later in life, he married his third wife Leona Rocha of Maui, Hawaii, the inventor of the fashion ruler and the 2010 elected member to the Board of Education Maui Residency Seat for the Hawaii Department of Education. The two had worked together at The Butterick Publishing Company when she was their national spokesperson and he the CEO; they remained married until his death in 2010. He, with his wife Leona Rocha, established the William & Leona Wilson Scholarship Fund at the University of Hawaiʻi Maui College.
