= George W. Blair =

American politician (1921–2020)

George Warren Blair

Member of the South Dakota House of Representatives
- In office 1979–1986

Personal details
- Born: August 24, 1921 Sturgis, South Dakota
- Died: January 1, 2020 (aged 98) Spearfish, South Dakota
- Party: Republican
- Spouse: Viola Hays (1956–2002)
- Children: 9
- Parents: Harry Blair (father); Elizabeth Johnson (mother)
- Education: Black Hills State Teachers College

Military service
- Branch/service: United States Air Force
- Battles/wars: World War II

George Warren Blair (August 24, 1921 – January 1, 2020) was an American politician in the state of South Dakota. He was a member of the South Dakota House of Representatives. Blair was born in Sturgis, South Dakota and graduated from Sturgis High School in 1938. He was a United States Air Force veteran of World War II and a cattle rancher.
