= Donald Evans (American poet) =

American poet (1884–1921)

Donald Evans (July 24, 1884 - May 26, 1921) was an American poet, publisher, music critic and journalist.

== Biography ==
Born in Philadelphia, he worked in newspapers from 1904 to 1915. Evans was educated at Haverford College. He married Leah Winslow in 1907, and later divorced her. A second marriage, to Esther Porter, began in 1918. Evans enlisted to fight in World War I in May 1917. He served as a sergeant. Associated with the avant-garde scene of Greenwich Village, his works relate a strong sense of irony as well as his own personal bohemianism, coupled with the deep influence of 1890s aestheticism.

Somewhat comparable to fellow bohemian poet Maxwell Bodenheim, many stories about his bohemian lifestyle circulated. Evans single-handedly founded and managed the Claire Marie press, intending to publish "New Books for Exotic Tastes". He stated its goals as thus, "Claire Marie believes there are in America seven hundred civilized people only. Claire Marie publishes books for civilized people only. Claire Marie's aim, it follows from the premises, is not even secondarily commercial." Evans was an early admirer of Gertrude Stein. He first published her Tender Buttons in 1914. Evans was also close to Wallace Stevens; it is said that the two planned to write a book of one-line poems together.

His works include 1914's Sonnets from the Patagonian, 1916's Two Deaths in the Bronx and 1919's Ironica. It is suspected that Evans' death in 1921 was a suicide.

== Bibliography ==
- Discords (1912)
- Sonnets from the Patagonian (1914)
- Two Deaths in the Bronx (1916)
- Nine Poems From a Valetudinarian (1916)
- Ironica (1919)
