= Edgewater =

Edgewater may refer to:

== Australia ==
- Edgewater, Western Australia

== United States ==
- Edgewater, Alabama
- Edgewater, Colorado
- Florida:
  - Edgewater, Broward County, Florida
  - Edgewater, Volusia County, Florida
  - Edgewater High School, in Orlando, Florida
  - Edgewater (Miami), a neighborhood within the City of Miami
- Illinois:
  - Edgewater, Chicago, Illinois
  - Edgewater Beach Hotel
  - Edgewater Presbyterian Church
- Edgewater Park Site, an Iowa archaeological site
- Edgewater, Maryland
- Edgewater, New Jersey
- Michigan:
  - Edgewater, Michigan, an unincorporated community
- New York State:
  - Edgewater, a building in the Cooperstown Historic District
  - Edgewater (Barrytown, New York), an historic mansion
- Edgewater, Cleveland, Ohio
- Wisconsin:
  - Edgewater, Wisconsin
  - Edgewater (community), Wisconsin

== Canada ==
- Edgewater, British Columbia

== Fictional places ==
- Edgewater, California, the setting for the TV series, Fire Country.

== Other uses ==
- Edgewater (band), from Dallas, Texas
  - Edgewater (album), a 1999 album

== See also ==
- Edgewater Hotel (disambiguation)
- Edgewater Park (disambiguation)
- Edgewater Technology, a technology management consulting firm headquartered in Wakefield, Massachusetts
