= Lifter =

Lifter may refer to:

- Ion-propelled aircraft, a device that can generate thrust using ionised air with no moving parts
- Lifter (band), an American grunge band
- Lifter Puller, an American indie rock band
- Lifter (album), a 2001 album by American band Edgewater
- Lifter (comics), a Marvel Comics character
- Liquid fluoride thorium reactor, shortened to "LFTR" and pronounced "lifter"
- Tappet, part of an internal combustion engine
- Thief, a person who engages in theft
- A filter that operates on a cepstrum, in signal processing
- "Lifter", a song by Deftones from the album Adrenaline

== See also ==
- LFTR, Liquid fluoride thorium reactor
