= Grindstone Lake (Wisconsin) =

Lake in Wisconsin, United States

- Location within Wisconsin Location within the United States
- Location: Sawyer County, Wisconsin
- Coordinates: 45°56′N 91°25′W
- Type: freshwater
- Basin countries: United States
- Max. length: approx. 3 mi (4.8 km)
- Max. width: approx. 2 mi (3.2 km)
- Surface area: 3,176 acres (1,285 ha)
- Max. depth: 60 ft (18 m)
- Water volume: 92,111.0 acre-feet (113,617,200 m^{3})
- Shore length^{1}: 10.5 mi (16.9 km)
- Surface elevation: 1,287 ft (392 m)
- ^{1} Shore length is not a well-defined measure.

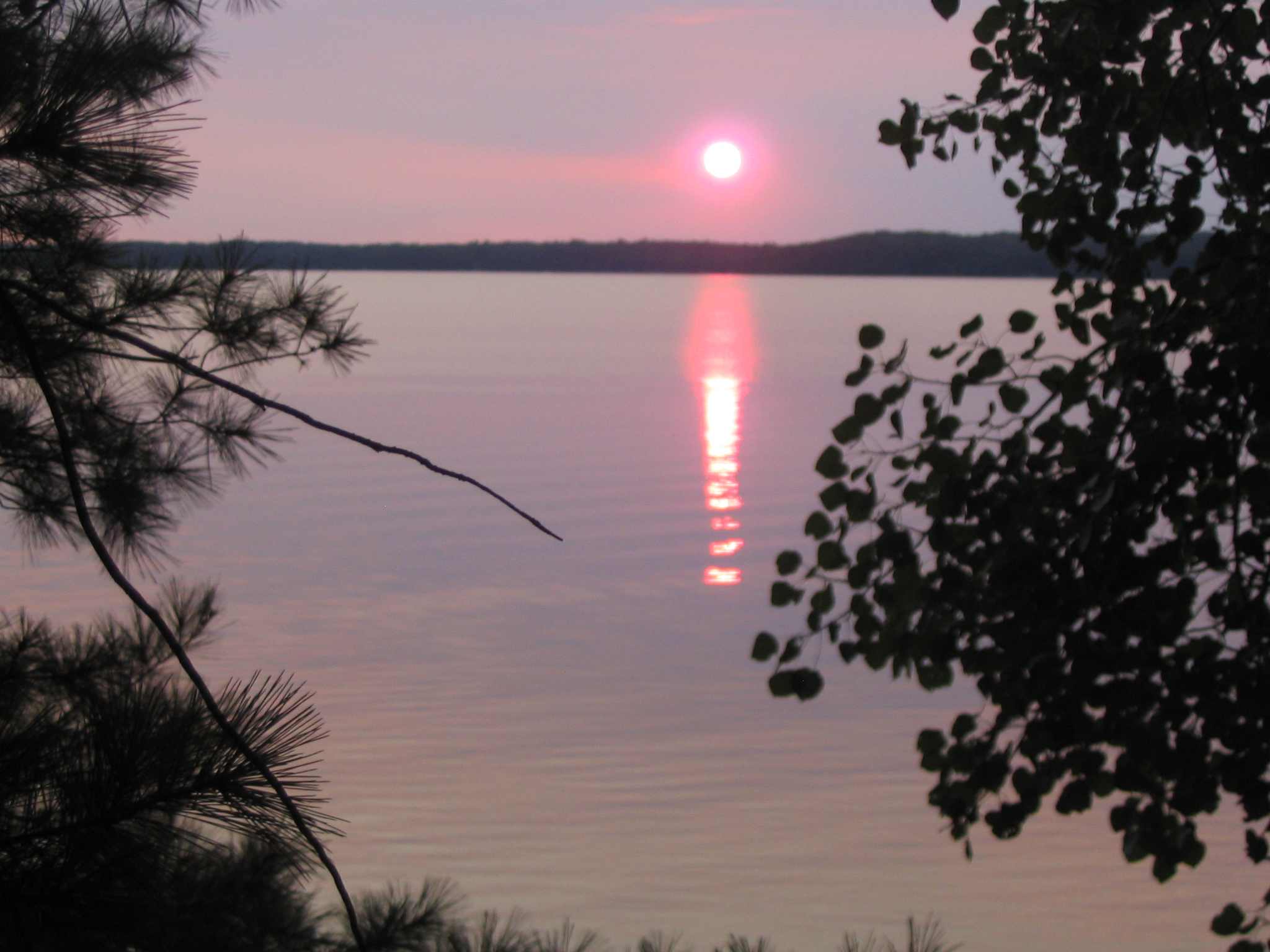
Grindstone Lake at sunset

== Geographical and general information ==
Grindstone Lake is a large freshwater lake located in north central Wisconsin in the Town of Bass Lake, Sawyer County, United States, in township 40 north, ranges 8 and 9 west. The lake is roughly oval shaped being approximately three miles in length east to west and two miles (3 km) north to south. Grindstone Lake is 3,176 acres (12.85 km^{2}) in size (including islands) with a maximum depth of 60 feet (18 m) and a shoreline of 10.5 miles (16.9 km). The lake has a small inlet stream (Grindstone Creek) that enters on the east shore of the lake and that originates from a series of springs (Upper Grindstone, Grindstone, Graveyard, and Lower Grindstone Springs) that are located a short distance northeast of the lake. There is an outlet on the southeast shore of the lake that leads through a small stream (also called Grindstone Creek) to Lac Courte Oreilles. There is a small island in the west corner named TTI.

Grindstone Lake is located approximately six miles southeast of the city of Hayward, the primary commercial and retail center of the area, and is one of three large natural lakes (Lac Courte Oreilles, Grindstone Lake, and Round Lake) located to the south and east of the city. There is a small unincorporated residential community on the south side of the lake commonly referred to as Northwoods (or North Woods) Beach. The eastern part of the lake is located in the Lac Courte Oreilles Indian Reservation. The shore of the lake is principally occupied by seasonal lake cabins and homes.

There are two public boat landings on Grindstone Lake: an improved landing at the southwest corner and a small, unimproved landing at the southeast corner near the outlet stream. A large commercial Cranberry bog was formerly located on the southwest shore of the lake near the improved boat landing but has now been closed. Grindstone Lake is a popular resort area drawing cabin owners and visitors from the Minneapolis-St. Paul, Milwaukee, and Chicago metropolitan areas.

== Origin of name ==
The Dictionary of Wisconsin History states that the name "Grindstone Lake" originates from the Chippewa word Gaa-zhiigwanaabikokaag meaning "a place abundant with grindstones." However, the lake has not always been referred to as "Grindstone Lake" in the past. Henry Schoolcraft in the report of his expedition through this area in 1831 called it "Lac du Gres" which means "Sandstone Lake" in French. Captain James Allen who accompanied Schoolcraft on an expedition in the following year (1832) to the source of the Mississippi River produced a detailed map of the northern Minnesota/Wisconsin area after that trip. On this map he labels Grindstone Lake in English as "Sandstone Lake."

== History ==
Prior to European exploration, the area of Grindstone Lake was inhabited by the Ojibwa Indians. The first known visit by Europeans to the area was around 1659 when Pierre-Esprit Radisson and Médard des Groseilliers travelled from Chequamegon Bay on Lake Superior southward through the area and stayed for a period at an Indian village that has been identified as being located on the nearby Lac Courte Oreilles.

Grindstone Lake was apparently well travelled by Indians and early traders and explorers who used it as part of the route from Lac Courte Oreilles (in the Chippewa River watershed), through Grindstone Lake and Windigo Lake and over the Namekagon Portage, to the Namekagon River (in the St. Croix River watershed). A later explorer, Jonathan Carver, passed through the area in 1767 and (on his way from the Indian village on Lac Courte Oreilles to the Namekagon River) specifically travelled through what the editor identifies as Grindstone Lake on June 29, 1767. The area was later visited by Henry Schoolcraft in 1831 who described crossing from the St. Croix River watershed to the Chippewa River watershed by ascending the Namekagon River, crossing the Namekagon Portage, and passing through Windigo Lake (called by him Lac des Isles) and Grindstone Lake (called by him Lac du Gres) to Lac Courte Oreilles.
