= Windigo Lake =

Lake in the state of Wisconsin, United States

- Location within Wisconsin Location within the United States
- Location: Sawyer County, Wisconsin, United States
- Coordinates: 45°55′49″N 91°28′12″W
- Type: freshwater
- Basin countries: United States
- Max. length: approx. 1 mi (1.6 km)
- Max. width: approx. 1 mi (1.6 km)
- Surface area: 529.6 acres (214.3 ha)
- Max. depth: 51 ft (16 m)
- Water volume: 7,256 acre⋅ft (8,950,000 m^{3})
- Shore length^{1}: 9 mi (14.4 km)
- Surface elevation: 1,292 ft (394 m)
- ^{1} Shore length is not a well-defined measure.

Windigo Lake is a freshwater lake located in north central Wisconsin in the Town of Bass Lake, Sawyer County, United States, in township 40 north, range 9 west. The lake is irregular in shape, with numerous peninsulas and bays, and is approximately one mile in diameter. Windigo Lake is 529.6 acres (2.143 km^{2}) in size (including islands) with a maximum depth of 51 feet (16 m) and a shoreline of 9 miles (14 km). The lake does not have an obvious inflow or outflow stream and is classified as a seepage lake, i.e., a lake without an inlet or an outlet.

Windigo Lake is approximately six miles south of the city of Hayward, the primary commercial and retail center of the area. The shore of the lake is principally occupied by seasonal lake cabins and homes. There is one public boat landing on the southeastern shore of the lake. Windigo Lake is a popular resort area, drawing cabin owners and visitors from the Minneapolis-St. Paul, Milwaukee, and Chicago metropolitan areas.

== Origin of Name ==
Windigo Lake is named after the Algonquian term "Windigo" (sometimes spelled Wendigo) which is a mythological cannibalistic creature in Ojibwa and Ottawa folklore. However, the lake has not always been referred to as "Windigo Lake." Henry Schoolcraft, in the report of his expedition through this area in 1831, called it "Lac des Isles," which means "Lake of the Isles" in French. Captain James Allen who accompanied Schoolcraft on an expedition in the following year (1832) to the source of the Mississippi River produced a detailed map of the northern Minnesota/Wisconsin area after that trip. On this map he labeled Windigo Lake in English as "Lake of the Isles." The Wisconsin Department of Natural Resources lake map for Windigo Lake gives "Bass Lake" as an alternative name for the lake; and an article from the Sawyer County Historical Society also indicates that Windigo Lake was formerly known as "Bass Lake."

== History ==
Prior to European exploration, the area of Windigo Lake was inhabited by the Ojibwa Indians. The first known visit by Europeans to the area was around 1659 when Pierre-Esprit Radisson and Médard des Groseilliers traveled from Chequamegon Bay on Lake Superior southward through the area and stayed for a period at an Indian village that has been identified as being located on nearby Lac Courte Oreilles.

Windigo Lake was apparently well traveled by Indians and early traders and explorers who used it as part of the route from Lac Courte Oreilles (in the Chippewa River watershed), through Grindstone Lake and Windigo Lake and over the Namekagon Portage, to the Namekagon River (in the St. Croix River watershed). A later explorer, Jonathan Carver, passed through the area in 1767 and traveled through what the editor identifies as Windigo Lake on June 29, 1767, on his way from the Indian village on Lac Courte Oreilles to the Namekagon River. The area was later visited by Henry Schoolcraft in 1831 who described crossing from the St. Croix River watershed to the Chippewa River watershed by ascending the Namekagon River, crossing the Namekagon Portage, and passing through Windigo Lake (called by him Lac des Isles) and Grindstone Lake (called by him Lac du Gres) to Lac Courte Oreilles.
