= Lake Chippewa (Wisconsin) =

- Chippewa Flowage
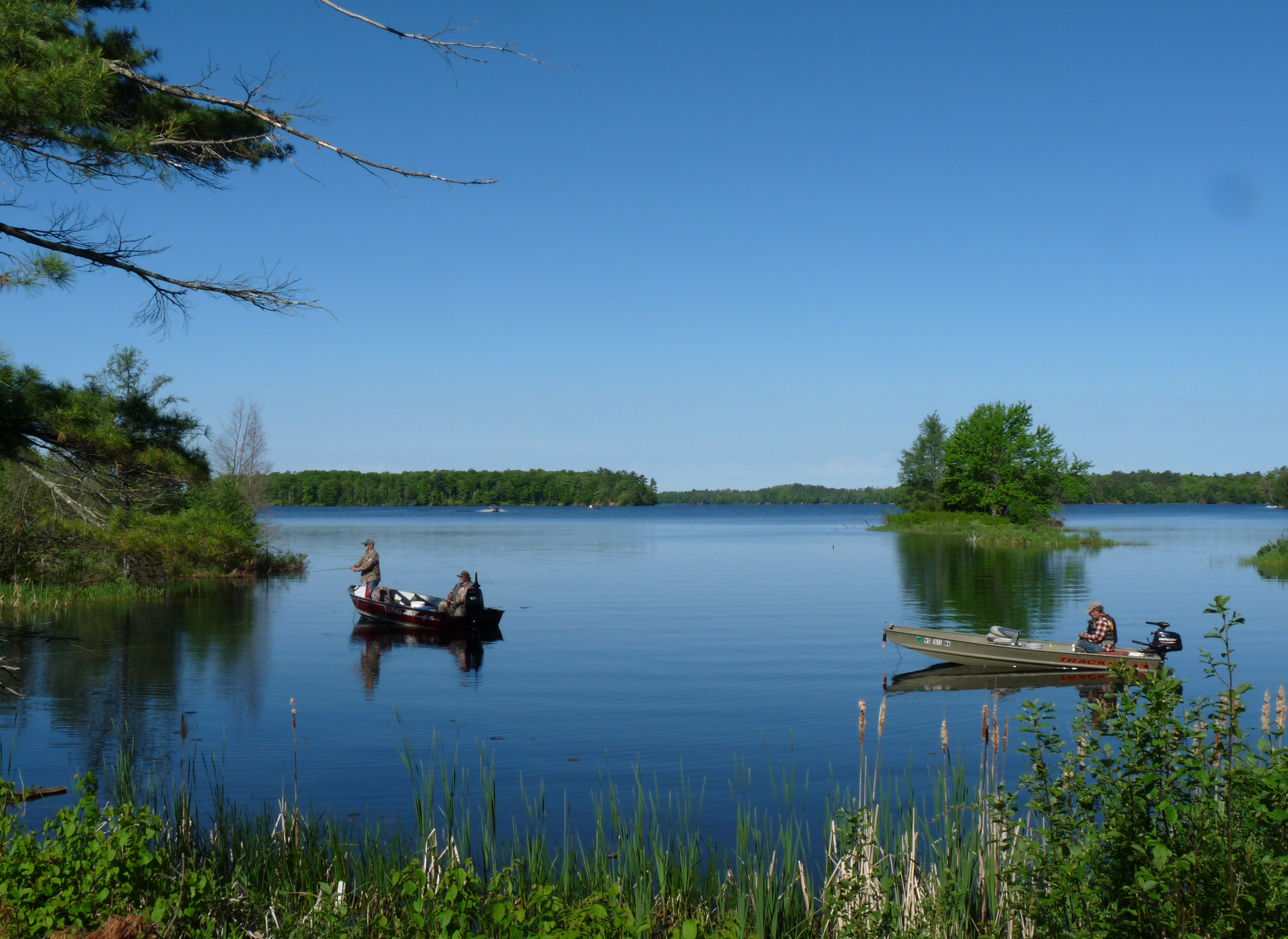
- From County CC looking west

- Location within Wisconsin Location within the United States
- Location: Sawyer County, Wisconsin
- Coordinates: 45.9297°N 91.1987°W
- Type: Reservoir
- Primary outflows: Chippewa River
- Surface area: 14,593 acres (5,906 ha)
- Max. depth: 92 feet (28 m)
- Surface elevation: 1,312 feet (400 m)
- Settlements: New Post

Lake Chippewa, also known as Chippewa Flowage, is an artificial lake created by the Winter dam in northwestern Wisconsin. The largest muskie caught in Wisconsin came from the Chippewa Flowage, at 63.5 inches (1.61 m) and 69 pounds (31 kg).

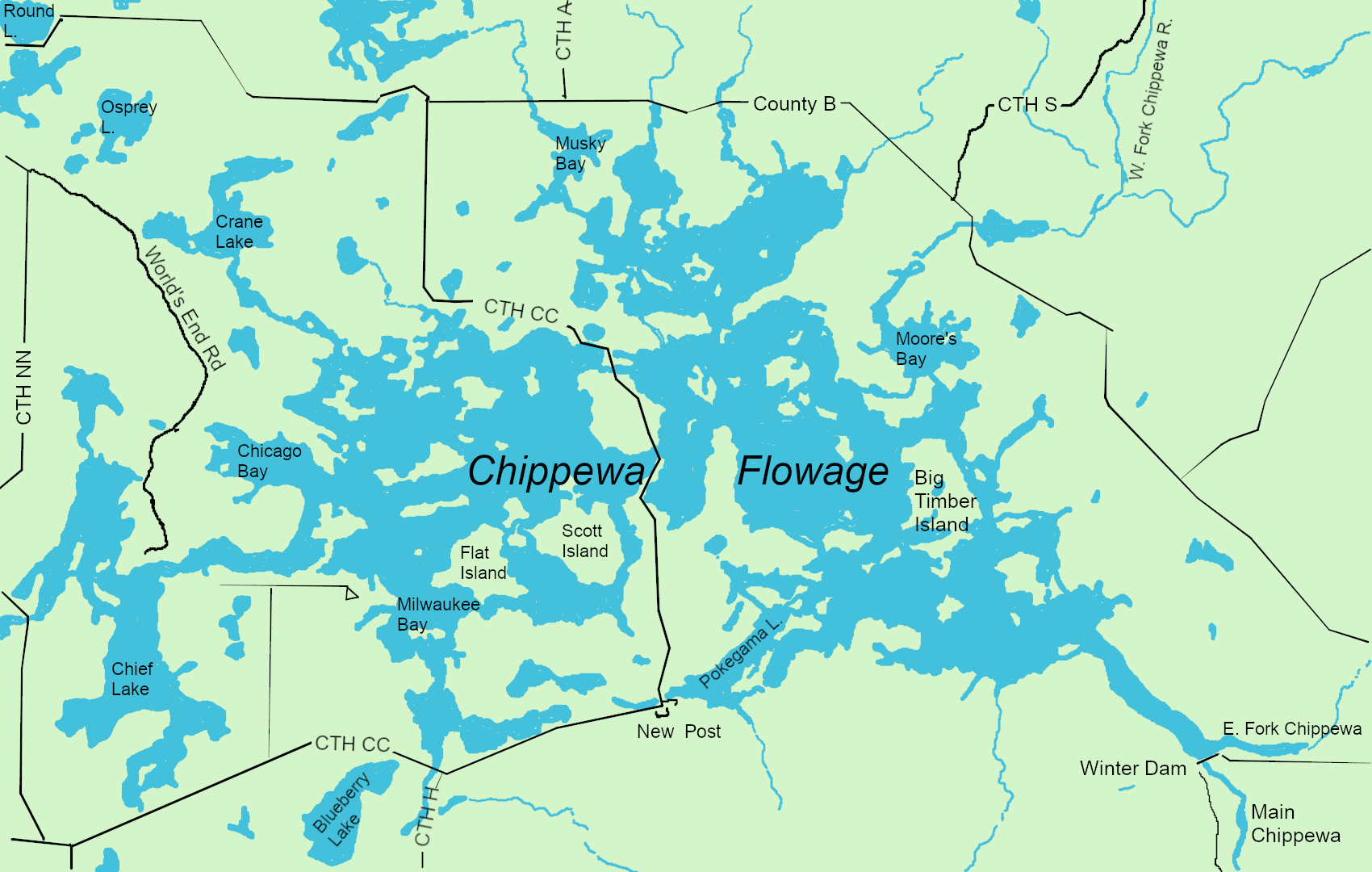
Map of the modern flowage, with some surroundings

The Chippewa Flowage is fed by the East and West forks of the Chippewa River and drained where the river exits through the Winter Dam. The flowage is the third-largest lake in Wisconsin, with 233 miles of irregular shoreline dotted with islands - mostly undeveloped and forested. Most of the shoreline is owned by the Wisconsin DNR, the Lac Courte Oreilles Band of Lake Superior Chippewa Indians, and the US Forest Service, with private properties interspersed. It is managed under the Chippewa Flowage Joint Agency plan developed by those stakeholders, with the overall goal, "to perpetuate the undeveloped shoreline character of the Chippewa Flowage and to manage for compatible resource opportunities."

Shallow in places, the flowage contains numerous stumps, submerged logs, rock bars, and floating bogs, providing ample fish habitat and ample boating hazards. The largest bog is known as the "Forty-Acre Bog".

== History ==
Before 1923 the area that would become the Chippewa Flowage was a network of streams, small lakes, and lowlands feeding the west fork of the Chippewa River. The Lac Courte Oreilles Ojibwe reservation encompassed much of the land along the water.

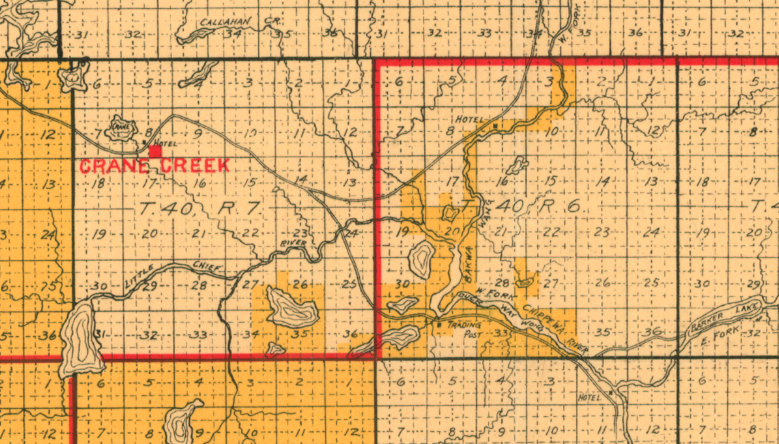
1900 map of the area that would be flooded to become the Chippewa Flowage, selecting the same rectangle of land as the map above

With the growing use of electricity at the start of the 20th century, area lumber companies and the state began to look into harnessing the Chippewa. In 1911 they formed the Chippewa and Flambeau Improvement Company, with the stated goal of producing "as nearly a uniform flow of water as practicable on the Chippewa and Flambeau Rivers." Surveys determined that the proposed dam would flood about 5,600 acres (2,300 ha) of reservation land, including sugar maple stands, wild rice marshes, cranberry bogs, Ojibwe graves, and the village of Post.

In 1914 Wisconsin-Minnesota Power and Light bought the rights to Chippewa and Flambeau Improvement's land and continued to acquire more land needed for the project - much of it cutover land that lumber companies were happy to unload. WMPL entered negotiations with the Ojibwe to flood their land, but the Ojibwe refused, on grounds that the 1854 treaty which granted them the reservation protected their land. That argument lasted six years, until the Federal Water Power Act of 1920 overruled the Ojibwe and green-lit the project. Wisconsin-Minnesota Light and Power was given a 50-year license to operate the dam.

Construction of the dam began in 1922 - an earthen dam a thousand feet long below the junction of the two forks of the Chippewa northwest of Winter. It was not a hydroelectric dam at that time; instead it provided a steady flow of water to the hydro dams downstream like the one at Lake Wissota. The dam's gates were closed in March of 1923 and the water began to rise. By the end of summer, the former village of Post was under 25 feet (7.6 m) of water.

Wisconsin-Minnesota Light and Power had partly moved the village to New Post as agreed, but not completely. WMLP also failed in their commitment to stock the new flowage with musky, pike and bass. They failed to replant wild rice beds in new locations to replace old flooded beds. They moved some Ojibwe graves, but left about 700 behind to be submerged. When the 50-year lease came up for renewal in 1971, the Ojibwe occupied the Winter Dam, then negotiated with Northern States Power and the government for return of land, larger payments, and the right to operate a hydro generator at the Winter dam and sell the power generated back to NSP. Since 2000, the Lac Courte Oreilles have managed the Flowage jointly with the Wisconsin DNR and the Forest Service.
