= Vertin =

Vertin is a surname. Notable people with the surname include:

- Diane Vertin (fl. 2004), American academic administrator
- John Vertin (1844–1899), American Catholic bishop

== Fictional ==
- Vertin, from the video game Reverse: 1999
