= Namekagon Portage =

The Namekagon Portage (sometimes referred to as the "Namekagon Court Oreilles Portage") was a well known canoe portage connecting the St. Croix River watershed to the Chippewa River watershed and was located about five miles south of the present day city of Hayward in Sawyer County, Wisconsin. The portage ran approximately two and one-half miles from the Namekagon River (in the St. Croix River watershed) to Windigo Lake in the Chippewa River watershed. The route then proceeded from Windigo Lake through Grindstone Lake to Lac Courte Oreilles where a well known Ojibwe village was located. This portage was used as one of the alternative routes to the Mississippi River for persons passing from Lake Superior to the Mississippi River by way of the Bois Brule River, as described below.

One of the important routes from Lake Superior to the Mississippi River led southward on the Bois Brule River to the Lake Superior/Mississippi River divide. From this point, a portage of approximately two miles passed over the divide to Upper St. Croix Lake (Bois Brule-St. Croix Portage). The route then led southward down the St. Croix to its junction with the Namekagon River. At this point, there were two major alternative routes to the Mississippi River.

The most direct route continued southward down the St. Croix River to its junction with the Mississippi River near present-day Hastings, Minnesota. However, this route led through territory held by Sioux Indians who were often at odds with the Ojibwe Indians of the upper St. Croix. The Ojibwe frequently acted as guides for the European explorers.

In order to avoid potential problems with the Sioux Indians on the lower St. Croix River, travelers could alternatively reach the Mississippi by way of the Chippewa River watershed. This was done by proceeding eastward from the St. Croix/Namekagon junction up the Namekagon River to the vicinity of current Hayward, Wisconsin. At this point, the route followed the Namekagon Portage across the divide between the St. Croix and Chippewa watersheds to Windigo Lake, through Grindstone Lake and Lac Courte Oreilles, and down the Couderay River to the Chippewa River which ultimately joined the Mississippi River at Lake Pepin.

Explorer Jonathan Carver passed through the area in 1767 traveling north from the Mississippi River to Lake Superior by way of the Chippewa River. His journal entry and survey journal for June 29 and 30, 1767 record his leaving the Ojibwe Indian village on Lac Courte Oreilles, passing through Grindstone Lake and Windigo Lake, and using the Namekagon Portage to reach the Namekagon River. An historical marker at the portage site (see external link below) indicates that Michel Cadotte established a fur-trading post at the northwestern end of the portage in 1784. The area was later visited by Henry Schoolcraft in 1831 who described the Namekagon Portage running from the Namekagon River to Lac Courte Oreilles by way of Windigo Lake (called by him Lac des Isles) and Grindstone Lake (called by him Lac du Gres).

The southeastern end of the Namekagon Portage is now indicated by a historical marker located approximately five and one-half miles south of Hayward on State Highway 27 (see external link below). According to statements in an opinion of the Wisconsin Attorney General, portions of the portage trail were apparently still visible and used by the general public as of 1986.
