= Edgewater, Florida =

Edgewater is the name of some places in the U.S. state of Florida:

- Edgewater, Broward County, Florida
- Edgewater, Volusia County, Florida
- Edgewater (Miami), a neighborhood within the City of Miami
