= Fritz Ackley =

American baseball player (1937–2002)

- Pitcher
- Born: April 10, 1937; Hunter, Wisconsin, U.S.
- Died: May 22, 2002 (aged 65); Duluth, Minnesota, U.S.
- Batted: Left Threw: Right

MLB debut
- September 21, 1963, for the Chicago White Sox

Last MLB appearance
- May 9, 1964, for the Chicago White Sox

MLB statistics
- Win–loss record: 1–0
- Earned run average: 4.19
- Strikeouts: 17
- Stats at Baseball Reference

Teams
- Chicago White Sox (1963–1964)

Florian Frederick Ackley (April 10, 1937 – May 22, 2002) was an American professional baseball pitcher who appeared in five Major League Baseball games for the Chicago White Sox for parts of the 1963 and 1964 seasons. A right-hander, he batted left-handed and was listed as 6 feet 1 inch (1.85 m) tall and 202 pounds (92 kg). He was a native of Hunter, Wisconsin, and attended Hayward High School.

Ackley's pro career began in 1954 and lasted for 13 seasons (1954–1959; 1961–1967). In 1963, Ackley won 18 games and lost only five for the Indianapolis Indians of the Triple-A International League and was named Pitcher of the Year; his team went on to win the Governors' Cup playoff title. In the closing weeks of that season, at age 26 and in his ninth year in pro ball, he made his Major League debut with two starting pitcher assignments, with a no-decision on September 21 against the Detroit Tigers, followed by his first and only MLB victory six days later, a seven-inning, 7–1 triumph against the Washington Senators. He started the 1964 campaign with the White Sox and worked in three games, including two starts, early in the year. But he was not as effective as in 1963 and was sent back to the minor leagues. He was purchased by the St. Louis Cardinals on November 24, 1964, but did not make it back to the major leagues.

In his five big-league games, Ackley posted a 1–0 career won–lost record and a 4.19 earned run average, permitting 17 hits and 11 bases on balls, with 17 strikeouts, in 191/3 innings pitched.
