= WOJB =

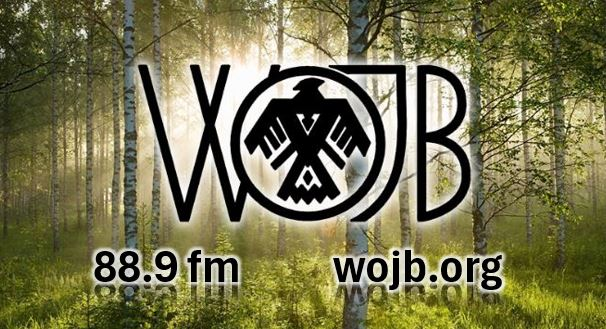
- Reserve, Wisconsin; United States
- Broadcast area: Northwestern Wisconsin
- Frequency: 88.9 MHz
- Branding: Community Powered Radio

Programming
- Format: Community radio
- Affiliations: Pacifica Radio Network

Ownership
- Owner: Lac Courte Oreilles Ojibwa Public Broadcasting Corporation

History
- First air date: March 1, 1982

Technical information
- Licensing authority: FCC
- Facility ID: 36197
- Class: C1
- ERP: 100,000 watts
- HAAT: 184 meters (604 ft)
- Transmitter coordinates: 45°52′15.8″N 91°20′56.6″W

Links
- Public license information: Public file; LMS
- Website: www.wojb.org

WOJB (88.9 MHz), is a community radio station broadcasting from the Lac Courte Oreilles Indian Reservation southeast of Hayward, Wisconsin. The station is licensed to Reserve, Wisconsin, and serves northwestern Wisconsin.

Founded in 1982 with the intention of bridging the culture gap between the Native American population in the area and their non-Native neighbors in a time of heightened racial tension, the station is now a fixture of the northwestern Wisconsin airwaves. WOJB presents a variety of programming, much of it presenting the culture of the local Ojibwe community and the wider Anishinaabe culture.

== See also ==
- List of community radio stations in the United States
