= Couderay (town), Wisconsin =

Town in Sawyer County, Wisconsin, US

Couderay, Wisconsin
- Town
- Town of Couderay
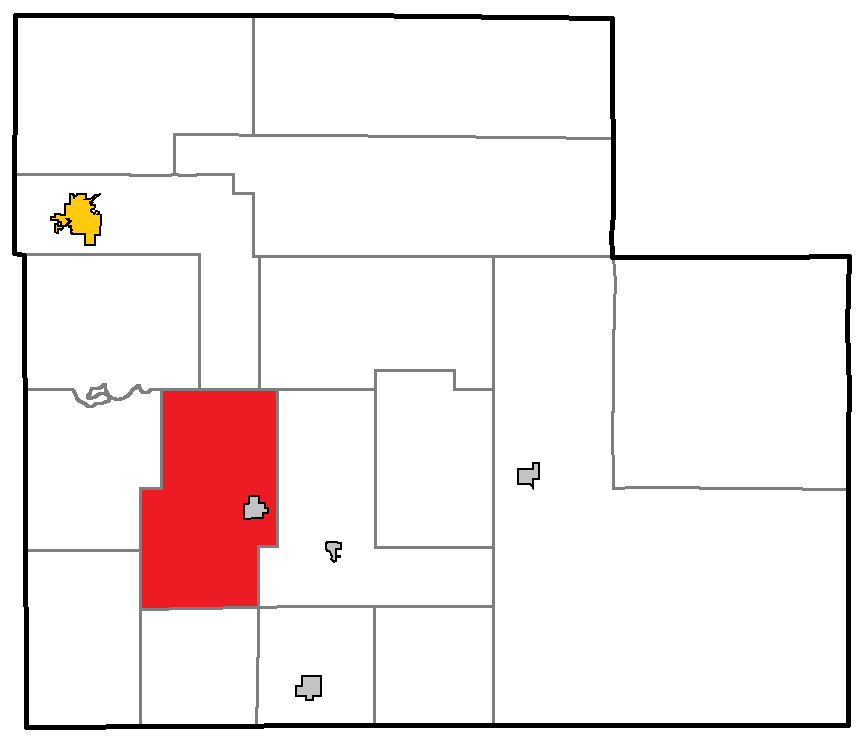
- Location of Couderay, within Sawyer County
- Coordinates: 45°48′21″N 91°20′48″W
- Country: United States
- State: Wisconsin
- County: Sawyer

Area
  - Total: 67.47 sq mi (174.7 km^{2})
  - Land: 66.66 sq mi (172.6 km^{2})
  - Water: 0.81 sq mi (2.1 km^{2})

Population (2020)
  - Total: 393
  - Density: 5.90/sq mi (2.28/km^{2})
- Time zone: UTC-6 (Central (CST))
  - Summer (DST): UTC-5 (CDT)
- Area code(s): 715 & 534
- GNIS feature ID: 1583021

Couderay is a town in Sawyer County, Wisconsin, United States. The population was 393 at the 2020 census. The village of Couderay, the census-designated place of Reserve, and the unincorporated community of Lemington are located within the town. The unincorporated community of Yarnell is located partially in the town.

== Geography ==
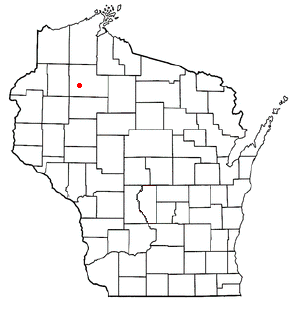
Location of Couderay (town), Wisconsin

According to the United States Census Bureau, the town has a total area of 67.3 square miles (174.3 km^{2}), of which 66.5 square miles (172.2 km^{2}) is land and 0.8 square mile (2.1 km^{2}) (1.20%) is water.

== Demographics ==
As of the census of 2000, there were 469 people, 176 households, and 117 families residing in the town. The population density was 7.1 people per square mile (2.7/km^{2}). There were 248 housing units at an average density of 3.7 per square mile (1.4/km^{2}). The racial makeup of the town was 42.64% White, 56.29% Native American, and 1.07% from two or more races. 0.00% of the population were Hispanic or Latino of any race.

There were 176 households, out of which 32.4% had children under the age of 18 living with them, 43.8% were married couples living together, 14.8% had a female householder with no husband present, and 33.0% were non-families. 30.1% of all households were made up of individuals, and 12.5% had someone living alone who was 65 years of age or older. The average household size was 2.66 and the average family size was 3.27.

In the town, the population was spread out, with 30.9% under the age of 18, 9.8% from 18 to 24, 25.2% from 25 to 44, 21.7% from 45 to 64, and 12.4% who were 65 years of age or older. The median age was 34 years. For every 100 females, there were 93.8 males. For every 100 females age 18 and over, there were 96.4 males.

The median income for a household in the town was $24,861, and the median income for a family was $32,143. Males had a median income of $27,500 versus $18,594 for females. The per capita income for the town was $12,916. About 13.2% of families and 16.6% of the population were below the poverty line, including 10.0% of those under age 18 and 10.7% of those age 65 or over.
