= South of Sideways =

Studio album by Edgewater
- Released: April 6, 2004
- Recorded: 2003–2004
- Genre: Post-grunge; nu metal; alternative rock; alternative metal
- Length: 47:42
- Label: Wind-up
- Producer: Eric Delegard

Edgewater chronology
Lifter (2001)	South of Sideways (2004)	We're Not Robots... (2006)

Singles from South of Sideways
- 1. "Eyes Wired Shut" Released: February 3, 2004

Professional ratings
Review scores
Source	Rating
Allmusic	3/5 stars

South of Sideways is the third studio album by American hard rock band Edgewater, released on April 6, 2004. It is the band's first album on a major label and includes tracks from their previous independent albums.

Musically, the album incorporates heavy guitar riffing, akin to Edgewater's numerous contemporaries, with an emphasis on melody. Digital effects are also evident in the background of various tracks. Moseman's vocals typically dwell in the realm of clean or heated singing but occasional boast drawn-out screams which give the album its alternative metal and nu metal edge.

The album's lone single, "Eyes Wired Shut", was included on the soundtrack for the 2004 film The Punisher. It was also the official theme song for WWE Backlash 2004.

== Track listing ==
All music written by Edgewater.

1. "Inhale" – 3:30
2. "Science of It All" – 3:55
3. "Eyes Wired Shut" – 3:16
4. "Neglected" – 4:10
5. "Break Me Out" – 3:54
6. "The Story of..." – 3:17
7. "Tres Quatros" – 5:32
8. "Sweet Suffocation" – 3:16
9. "One Perfect Something" – 3:38
10. "Circles" – 3:53
11. "Quitter" – 4:16
12. "Lifter" (Note: Listed as "Litter" on digital releases) – 5:05

== Personnel ==
- Matt Moseman - vocals
- Justin Middleton - guitar
- Micah Creel - guitar
- Ricky Wolking - bass
- Jeremy "Worm" Rees - drums
