= Lac Courte Oreilles Ojibwe University =

Tribal land-grant college in Hayward, Wisconsin, U.S.

Coordinates: 45°56′33.0″N 91°21′55.2″W

- Type: Public tribal land-grant community college
- Established: 1982
- President: Russell Swagger
- Students: 150
- Location: Hayward, Wisconsin, United States
- Campus: Rural
- Website: www.lco.edu

Lac Courte Oreilles Ojibwe University (LCOOU) is a public tribal land-grant community college in Hayward, Wisconsin. It is one of two tribal colleges in the state of Wisconsin (Wisconsin Tribal Colleges). The enrollment averages 550 students. The LCOOU has a main campus in Hayward. More than one-third of students are enrolled at the four outreach sites at Odanah, Bayfield, Hertel, and Lac du Flambeau.

== History ==
The college was founded by the Lac Courte Oreilles Band of Lake Superior Chippewa Indians in 1982 to serve the tribe and the local Hayward community. The college is one of the two tribal colleges in Wisconsin, which are owned and operated by American Indian tribes. In 1994, the college was designated a land-grant college alongside 31 other tribal colleges. Diane Vertin was president until November 2017. She was succeeded by interim president Barbara Lundberg.

== Academics ==
The LCOOU provides career, cultural and liberal arts education through 13 associate degree programs, technical diploma programs, certifications and adult continuing education programs. More than 70 percent of students are American Indian. The college maintains an open door policy with both traditional and non-traditional students attending. The average age of an LCOOU student is 34. Smaller class sizes lead to more individualized attention and support; the student-to-faculty ratio is consistently ten-to-one.

The college is regionally accredited by the Higher Learning Commission. Formal articulation and transfer agreements are in place between LCOOU and University of Wisconsin, University of Minnesota, and other public colleges. LCOOU is a member of the American Indian Higher Education Consortium (AIHEC), which is a community of tribally and federally chartered institutions working to strengthen tribal nations and make a lasting difference in the lives of American Indians and Alaska Natives. LCOOU was created in response to the higher education needs of American Indians. It is generally serves geographically isolated populations that have no other means accessing education beyond the high school level.
