= Waadookodaading =

Waadookodaading Ojibwe Language Institute

Location
- 8575 W Trepania Rd, Hayward, WI 54843; Hayward, Wisconsin; United States; 45.944°N 91.357°W

Information
- Type: Indigenous nonprofit organization
- Established: 2001
- Principal: Lisa LaRonge
- Grades: K–8
- Enrollment: 415 (2023-24)

Waadookodaading Ojibwe Language Institute (Waadookodaading) is an Ojibwe-language immersion school located on the Lac Courte Oreilles Ojibwe Reservation in Hayward, Wisconsin.

== History ==
The immersion program was started during the 2000–2001 academic school year by the Lac Courte Oreilles Band of Lake Superior Chippewa Indians.

== Mission ==
The school was primarily conceived to preserve the Ojibwe (Anishinaabe)-language in Wisconsin, where only a few dozen elderly native speakers were estimated to remain in 2019. The name of the school roughly translates to “helping one another.”

== Facility ==
Waadookodaading is physically connected to the English-language Lac Courte Oreilles Ojibwe School, but functions autonomously.

== Academics ==
In addition to state and federally-mandated academic requirements, Waadookodaading provides cultural activities such as harvesting wild rice and syrup, as well as snowshoeing. The school currently offers kindergarten through eighth grade education.

== Organization and funding ==
Waadookodaading is an independent charter institution. In 2024, it received $5 million in federal funding aimed at expanding its operations to K-12. The Administration for Native Americans also granted the school $300,000 in 2024. In December 2024, the school announced that it received a $1.5 million donation from philanthropist MacKenzie Scott.
