= Little Round Lake, Wisconsin =

Census-designated place in Wisconsin, United States

- CDP
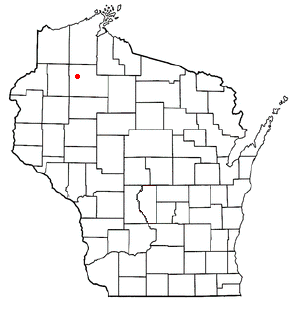
- Location of Little Round Lake, Wisconsin
- Coordinates: 45°58′17″N 91°20′17″W
- Country: United States
- State: Wisconsin
- County: Sawyer

Area
  - Total: 9.1 sq mi (24 km^{2})
  - Land: 8.9 sq mi (23 km^{2})
  - Water: 0.2 sq mi (0.52 km^{2})
- Elevation: 1,319 ft (402 m)

Population (2020)
  - Total: 1,242
  - Density: 140/sq mi (54/km^{2})
- Time zone: UTC-6 (Central (CST))
  - Summer (DST): UTC-5 (CDT)
- Area codes: 715 & 534
- FIPS code: 55-45220
- GNIS feature ID: 1867662

Little Round Lake is a census-designated place (CDP) in the town of Bass Lake, Sawyer County, Wisconsin, United States. The population was 1,242 at the 2020 census. It is the largest community on the reservation of the federally recognized tribe of the Lac Courte Oreilles Band of Lake Superior Chippewa Indians.

== Geography ==
According to the United States Census Bureau, the CDP has a total area of 9.1 square miles (23.4 km^{2}), of which 8.8 square miles (22.8 km^{2}) is land and 0.2 square mile (0.6 km^{2}) (2.54%) is water.

== Demographics ==
Historical population
Census	Pop.	Note	%±
2000	948		—
2010	1,081		14.0%
2020	1,242		14.9%
U.S. Decennial Census

As of the census of 2000, there were 948 people, 273 households, and 235 families residing in the CDP. The population density was 107.4 people per square mile (41.5/km^{2}). There were 303 housing units at an average density of 34.3/sq mi (13.3/km^{2}). The racial makeup of the CDP was 8.23% White, 89.87% Native American, 0.53% from other races, and 1.37% from two or more races. Hispanic or Latino of any race were 2.74% of the population.

There were 273 households, out of which 63.0% had children under the age of 18 living with them, 22.0% were married couples living together, 50.9% had a female householder with no husband present, and 13.6% were non-families. 9.9% of all households were made up of individuals, and 3.7% had someone living alone who was 65 years of age or older. The average household size was 3.47 and the average family size was 3.52.

In the CDP, the population was spread out, with 45.3% under the age of 18, 9.3% from 18 to 24, 27.5% from 25 to 44, 13.2% from 45 to 64, and 4.7% who were 65 years of age or older. The median age was 21 years. For every 100 females, there were 90.0 males. For every 100 females age 18 and over, there were 80.8 males.

The median income for a household in the CDP was $17,574, and the median income for a family was $17,019. Males had a median income of $23,036 versus $20,104 for females. The per capita income for the CDP was $7,819. About 42.8% of families and 42.7% of the population were below the poverty line, including 51.4% of those under age 18 and 6.1% of those age 65 or over.

English was spoken in 87.82% of homes and Ojibwe in 12.18% of homes.
