= Reserve, Wisconsin =

Census-designated place in Wisconsin, United States

- CDP
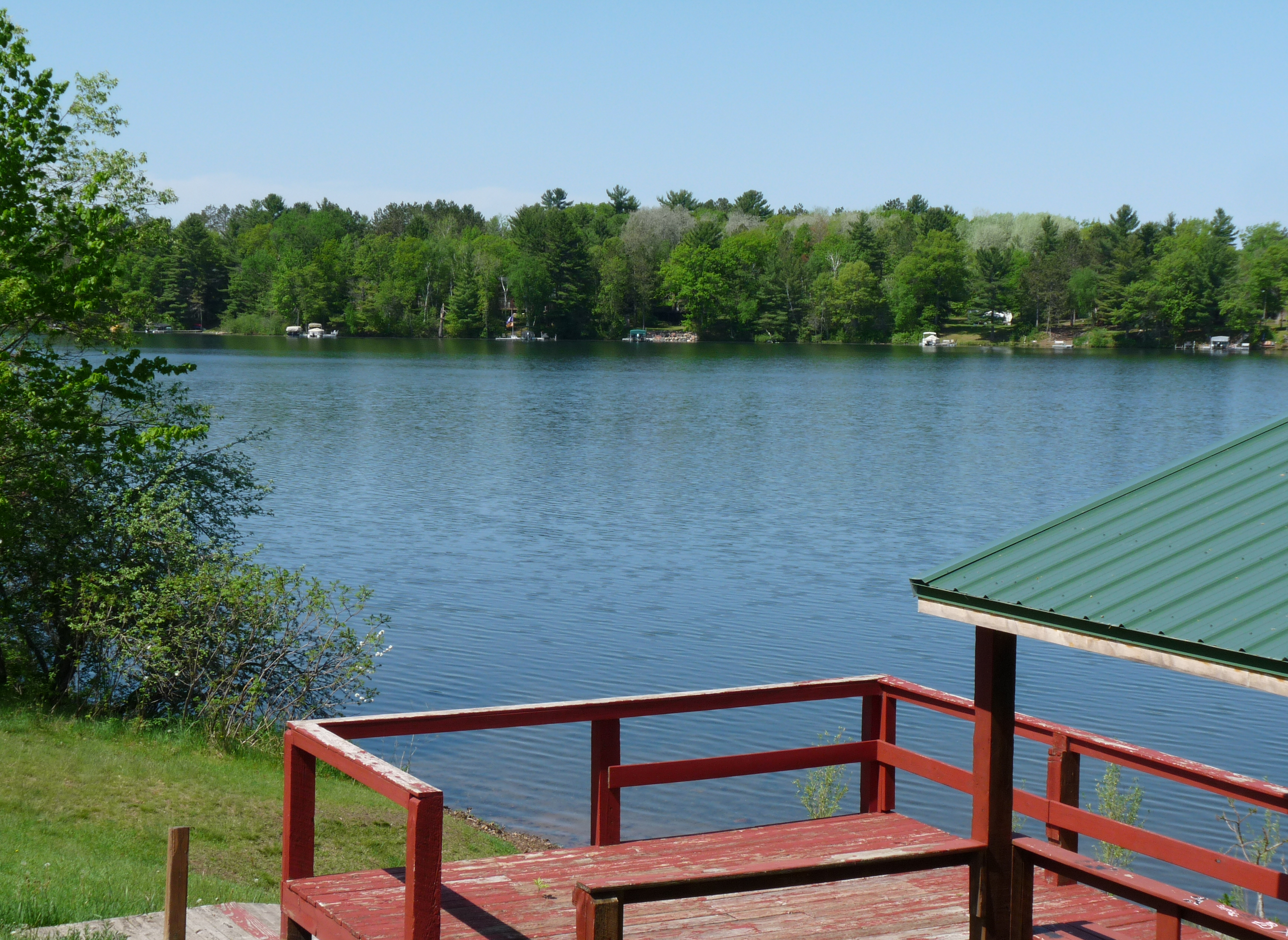
- Looking west across Little Lac Courte Oreilles

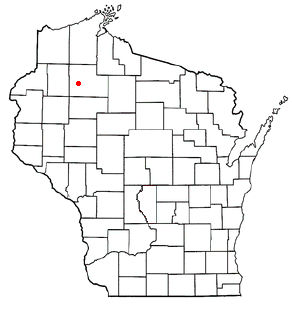
- Location of Reserve, Wisconsin
- Coordinates: 45°51′36″N 91°22′22″W
- Country: United States
- State: Wisconsin
- County: Sawyer

Area
  - Total: 53.7 sq mi (139.1 km^{2})
  - Land: 53.0 sq mi (137.3 km^{2})
  - Water: 0.69 sq mi (1.8 km^{2})
- Elevation: 1,306 ft (398 m)

Population (2020)
  - Total: 349
  - Density: 6.58/sq mi (2.54/km^{2})
- Time zone: UTC-6 (Central (CST))
  - Summer (DST): UTC-5 (CDT)
- Area codes: 715 & 534
- FIPS code: 55-67050
- GNIS feature ID: 1572206

Reserve is a census-designated place (CDP) in the Town of Couderay, Sawyer County, Wisconsin, United States, and on the Lac Courte Oreilles Indian Reservation. Its population was 349 at the 2020 census.

== Geography ==
Reserve is located at 45°51′36″N 91°22′22″W (45.859877, -91.372722), on Little Lac Courte Oreilles Lake.

According to the United States Census Bureau, the CDP has a total area of 53.7 square miles (139.1 km^{2}), of which 53.0 square miles (137.3 km^{2}) is land and 0.7 square mile (1.8 km^{2}) (1.30%) is water.

== History ==
In 1661-62 Huron Indians were probably living near where Reserve now stands, and the French fur traders Radisson and Groseilliers probably came down from Madeline Island to trade.

In 1745, when the area was still dominated by Lakota, an Ojibwe hunting party camped on the shore of Little Lac Courte Oreilles, and an Ojibwe community began to grow there. In 1800 Michel Cadotte established the first permanent trading post nearby for the North West fur trading company, with 22-year-old John Baptist Corbin as the first clerk and the first white settler in the area. Corbin married a Lac Courte Oreilles woman and their descendants still live around the area.

St. Francis Solanus Catholic church of Reserve has roots going back to 1790, when the first Ojibwe in the area were converted to Christianity. In 1878 Franciscan priests took charge of the mission. In 1885 a log cabin church was completed, along with a school and Sisters' convent. The old church building was destroyed by lightning in 1921, then rebuilt from local pipestone.

WOJB, based near Reserve, is Wisconsin's only Indian public radio station. It was founded in the 1980s, aiming to build bridges between the Native and non-Native communities in the area.

== Demographics ==
Historical population
Census	Pop.	Note	%±
2000	436		—
2010	429		−1.6%
2020	349		−18.6%
U.S. Decennial Census

As of the census of 2000, there were 436 people, 160 households, and 103 families residing in the CDP. The population density was 8.2 people per square mile (3.2/km^{2}). There were 252 housing units at an average density of 4.8/sq mi (1.8/km^{2}). The racial makeup of the CDP was 17.66% White, 82.11% Native American, and 0.23% from two or more races.

There were 160 households, out of which 31.9% had children under the age of 18 living with them, 34.4% were married couples living together, 18.8% had a female householder with no husband present, and 35.6% were non-families. 33.1% of all households were made up of individuals, and 12.5% had someone living alone who was 65 years of age or older. The average household size was 2.73 and the average family size was 3.42.

In the CDP, the population was spread out, with 33.3% under the age of 18, 11.2% from 18 to 24, 25.2% from 25 to 44, 20.0% from 45 to 64, and 10.3% who were 65 years of age or older. The median age was 30 years. For every 100 females, there were 100.9 males. For every 100 females age 18 and over, there were 92.7 males.

The median income for a household in the CDP was $22,250, and the median income for a family was $32,750. Males had a median income of $23,125 versus $21,094 for females. The per capita income for the CDP was $10,588. About 22.7% of families and 26.2% of the population were below the poverty line, including 11.8% of those under age 18 and 21.7% of those age 65 or over.
