= Lac Courte Oreilles =

Lake in Sawyer County, Wisconsin, US

- Odaawaa-zaaga'igan (Ojibwe)
- Location within Wisconsin Location within the United States
- Location: Sawyer County, Wisconsin, United States
- Coordinates: 45°53′N 91°25′W
- Basin countries: United States
- Max. length: approx. 6 mi (9.6 km)
- Max. width: approx. 2 mi (3.2 km) at widest
- Surface area: 5,039 acres (2,039 ha)
- Max. depth: 90 ft (27 m)
- Water volume: 168,800 acre-feet (208,200,000 m^{3})
- Shore length^{1}: 25.4 mi (40.9 km)
- ^{1} Shore length is not a well-defined measure.

Lac Courte Oreilles (/ləˈkuːdəreɪ/ lə-KOO-də-ray) is a large freshwater lake in northwest Wisconsin in Sawyer County in townships 39 and 40 north, ranges 8 and 9 west. It is irregular in shape, with many peninsulas and bays, and is about six miles long in a southwest to northeast direction, with a maximum width of about two miles (3 km). Lac Courte Oreilles is 5,039 acres (20.39 km^{2}) in size, with a maximum depth of 90 feet (27 m) and a shoreline of 25.4 miles (40.9 km). It has a small inlet stream, Grindstone Creek, that enters on its northeast shore and flows from Grindstone Lake, a short distance to the north. An outlet on the southeast shore leads to Little Lac Courte Oreilles, then via the Couderay River to the Chippewa River, and ultimately to the Mississippi River at Lake Pepin.

Lac Courte Oreilles is about eight and a half miles southeast of the city of Hayward, the primary commercial and retail center of the area, and is one of three large natural lakes (Lac Courte Oreilles, Grindstone Lake, and Round Lake) south and east of the city. There is a small unincorporated residential community on the lake's north side commonly called Northwoods (or North Woods) Beach. The eastern part of the lake is in the Lac Courte Oreilles Indian Reservation. The shore is principally occupied by seasonal cabins and homes.

Lac Courte Oreilles has an abundance of northern pike, muskie, walleye, bass, and other fish, and is a popular fishing destination. It is a popular resort area, drawing cabin owners and visitors from the Minneapolis-St. Paul, Milwaukee, and Chicago metropolitan areas.

== Origin of name ==
The name Lac Courte Oreilles is shared by the nearby Lac Courte Oreilles Indian Reservation. In the Ojibwe language, the lake is called Odaawaa-zaaga'iganiing, meaning 'Odawa Lake,' after another of the Anishinaabe peoples. It was referred to as such (or as "Ottowaw Lake") in early English-language descriptions of the area.

French fur trappers, the earliest European explorers in the area, named it Lac Courte Oreilles after the Odawa Anishinaabe peoples living in the area. The French believed they cut off the edges of their ear lobes, so referred to them as the Courtes Oreilles, or 'Short Ears.' An alternative explanation is that some tribes in the region had a practice of distending their earlobes by earrings or other ornaments, and the local people's ears looked short in contrast. But the Indians of the Lac Courte Oreilles area did not practice that custom and had naturally shaped "short" ears.

== History ==
Prior to European exploration, the area of Lac Courte Oreilles was inhabited by the Ojibwa Indians. The first known visit by Europeans to the area was around 1660. Pierre-Esprit Radisson and Médard des Groseilliers travelled from Chequamegon Bay on Lake Superior southward through the area in 1659 and stayed for a period at an Ojibwe village on a lake that has been identified as Lac Courte Oreilles.

The English explorer Jonathan Carver passed through the area in 1767 while traveling north from the Mississippi River up the Chippewa River. He reported staying at the Indian village on Lac Courte Oreilles (he referred to it as Ottowaw Lakes) from June 22 through 29, 1767. He described the village as being on either side of a channel between two lakes, which he referred to as the Ottowaw Lakes. He next travelled to the St. Croix River (by way of Grindstone Lake, Windigo Lake, the Namekagon Portage, and the Namekagon River) and thence northward to Lake Superior. In describing their visit to the Lac Courte Oreilles Indian village, Carver and another member of the expedition, James Stanley Goddard, said that they were the first white people to have visited the area. They likely did not know about the travels of Radisson and Groseilliers to the area about 1660, more than one hundred years before, and were not likely to have been reading French sources, if available.

The 19th-century United States Indian agent in this area, Henry Rowe Schoolcraft, visited the lake and Ottawa village in 1831. He described the trip from the Namekagon River to Lac Courte Oreilles by way of the Namekagon Portage, Windigo Lake and Grindstone Lake. Schoolcraft visited the Indian village on Lac Courte Oreilles and described it as being located at the outlet of the lake. From Carver's and Schoolcraft's descriptions, the Ottawa village appeared to have been located on either side of the channel between Lac Courte Oreilles and Little Lac Courte Oreilles.

Lac Courte Oreilles and this village were well known to traders and explorers of the time, and the village was one of the larger Indian settlements in the area. Schoolcraft listed its population as 504 persons in his report based on his 1832 exploration to the sources of the Mississippi River. This meant that it was one of the largest Indian settlements in the region. The village's importance was likely associated with the strategic site of Lac Courte Oreilles on the route between the Chippewa River watershed and the St. Croix River watershed. The latter watershed was reached from Lac Courte Oreilles by travelling north and west through Grindstone Lake, Windigo Lake, and over the Namekagon Portage to the Namekagon River in the St. Croix River watershed.
