= Edgewater Park =

Edgewater Park can refer to a location in the United States:

- The Edgewater Park Site, an archaeology site in Iowa
- Edgewater Park, New Jersey, a township
- Edgewater Park (Bronx), New York, a neighborhood
- Edgewater Park (Cleveland), a portion of the Cleveland Metroparks Lakefront Reservation in Ohio
- Edgewater Park, Oklahoma, a census-designated place

== See also ==
- Edgewater (disambiguation)
