= New Post, Wisconsin =

Census-designated place in Wisconsin, United States

- CDP
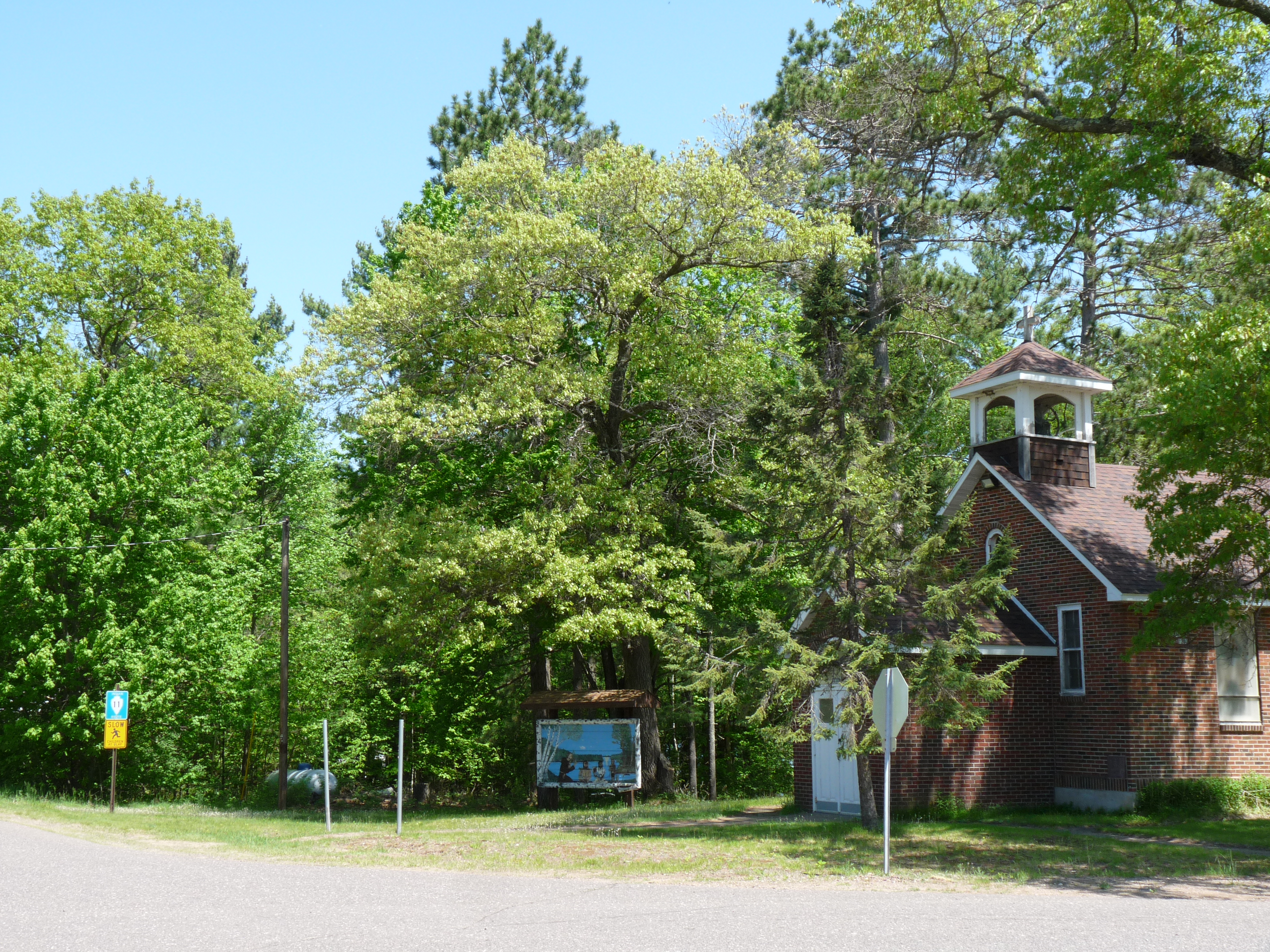
- St. Ignatius church at New Post

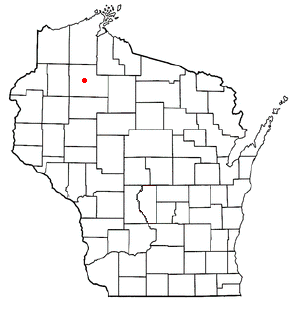
- Location of New Post, Wisconsin
- Coordinates: 45°54′14″N 91°10′43″W
- Country: United States
- State: Wisconsin
- County: Sawyer

Area
  - Total: 27.4 sq mi (71 km^{2})
  - Land: 20.5 sq mi (53 km^{2})
  - Water: 6.9 sq mi (18 km^{2})
- Elevation: 1,329 ft (405 m)

Population (2020)
  - Total: 302
  - Density: 14.7/sq mi (5.69/km^{2})
- Time zone: UTC-6 (Central (CST))
  - Summer (DST): UTC-5 (CDT)
- Area codes: 715 & 534
- FIPS code: 55-57050
- GNIS feature ID: 1580001

New Post is a census-designated place (CDP) in the town of Hunter, Sawyer County, Wisconsin, United States and on the Lac Courte Oreilles reservation. New Post's population was 302 at the 2020 census.

== History ==
Before the 1920s an Ojibwe community called Pahquawong lay along the west fork of the Chippewa River, two miles northeast of New Post. Around 1865 Maine-born Thaddeus Thayer started a trading post at that community, and married Mary Anibish, an Ojibwe woman. During the logging era of the late 1800s Thayer's place became the north terminus of the Chippewa Trail, a tote road along the river that carried loggers and supplies from Chippewa Falls to logging camps upstream. Thayer built a hotel for loggers and other travelers, and the Catholic mission started St. Anthony Church in 1884. Along with Pahquawong, the community was called Trading Post, or Post.

In the 1910s lumber companies, the state of Wisconsin, and Wisconsin-Minnesota Light and Power began moving toward damming the Chippewa nearby, as a part of a system that would moderate floods and generate electricity. The proposed dam would flood many acres of reservation land. The Ojibwa resisted, arguing that flooding their land would violate guarantees of the 1854 treaty that granted the land to them. After six years, their argument was overruled by the Federal Water Power Act of 1920. Construction of the Winter dam began in 1922 and the reservoir began filling in March of 1923. By summer's end, the old village of Post lay under 25 feet (7.6 m) of water. Wisconsin-Minnesota Light and Power had agreed to move the old village to a new site, and they had begun building new homes, but not enough for the families flooded out.

The new homes were built at New Post, now on the south shore of the Chippewa Flowage. In 1934 St. Ignatius church was built there to replace St. Anthony church, which had been left on an island.

== Geography ==
New Post is located at 45°54′14″N 91°10′43″W (45.903968, -91.178564).

According to the United States Census Bureau, the CDP has a total area of 27.4 square miles (71.0 km^{2}), of which 20.4 square miles (52.7 km^{2}) is land and 7.1 square miles (18.3 km^{2}) (25.74%) is water.

== Demographics ==
Historical population
Census	Pop.	Note	%±
2000	367		—
2010	305		−16.9%
2020	302		−1.0%
U.S. Decennial Census

As of the census of 2000, there were 367 people, 156 households, and 97 families residing in the CDP. The population density was 18.0 people per square mile (7.0/km^{2}). There were 425 housing units at an average density of 20.9/sq mi (8.1/km^{2}). The racial makeup of the CDP was 34.60% White, 65.12% Native American, and 0.27% from two or more races. Hispanic or Latino of any race were 1.63% of the population.

There were 156 households, out of which 25.6% had children under the age of 18 living with them, 41.0% were married couples living together, 16.0% had a female householder with no husband present, and 37.2% were non-families. 32.1% of all households were made up of individuals, and 9.0% had someone living alone who was 65 years of age or older. The average household size was 2.35 and the average family size was 2.94.

In the CDP, the population was spread out, with 24.8% under the age of 18, 7.4% from 18 to 24, 27.0% from 25 to 44, 27.8% from 45 to 64, and 13.1% who were 65 years of age or older. The median age was 39 years. For every 100 females, there were 112.1 males. For every 100 females age 18 and over, there were 115.6 males.

The median income for a household in the CDP was $29,219, and the median income for a family was $28,000. Males had a median income of $23,750 versus $21,528 for females. The per capita income for the CDP was $12,395. About 11.1% of families and 16.0% of the population were below the poverty line, including 23.6% of those who are under age 18 and 13.1% of those age 65 or over.
