= Hunter, Wisconsin =

- Town
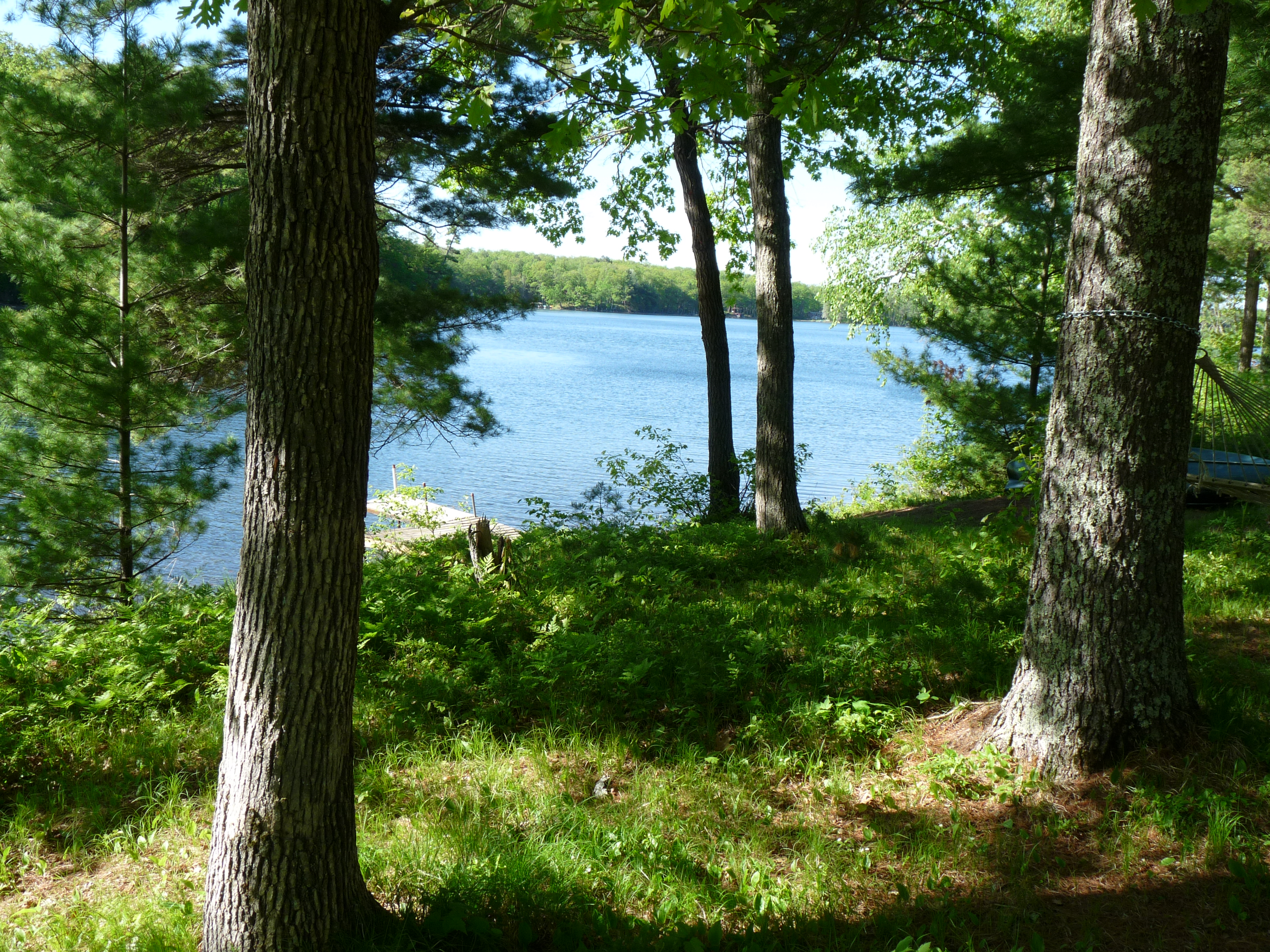
- Looking south from the north end of Osprey Lake

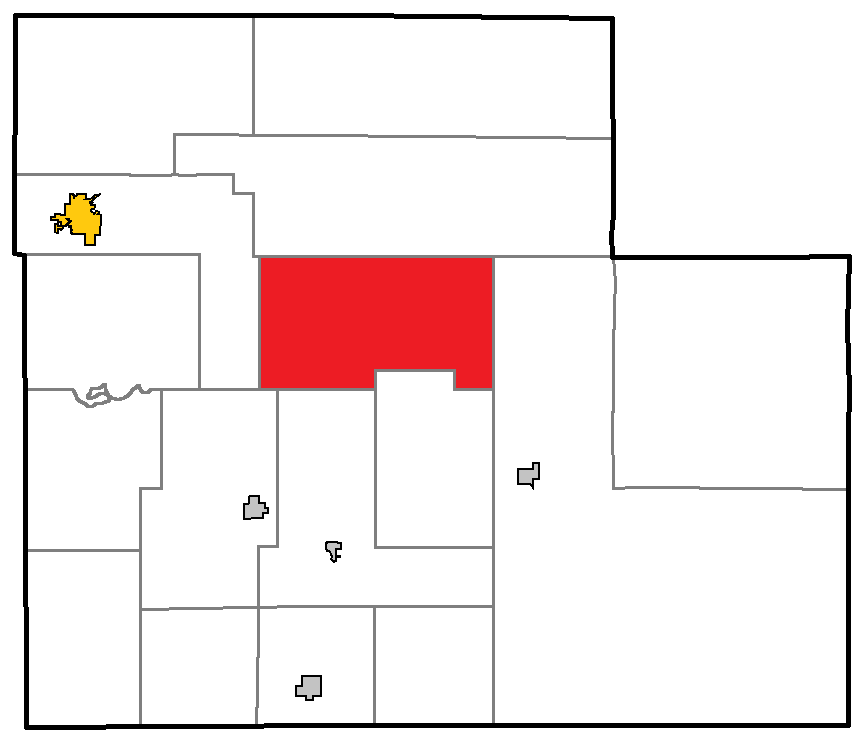
- Location of Hunter, within Sawyer County
- Coordinates: 45°56′8″N 91°10′27″W
- Country: United States
- State: Wisconsin
- County: Sawyer

Area
  - Total: 76.0 sq mi (196.8 km^{2})
  - Land: 52.1 sq mi (135.0 km^{2})
  - Water: 23.9 sq mi (61.8 km^{2})
- Elevation: 1,300 ft (400 m)

Population (2020)
  - Total: 779
  - Density: 14.9/sq mi (5.77/km^{2})
- Time zone: UTC-6 (Central (CST))
  - Summer (DST): UTC-5 (CDT)
- Area codes: 715 & 534
- FIPS code: 55-36450
- GNIS feature ID: 1583423
- Website: https://www.townofhunterwi.net/

Hunter is a town in Sawyer County, Wisconsin, United States. The population was 779 at the 2020 census. The census-designated place of New Post is located in the town.

== Geography ==
According to the United States Census Bureau, the town has a total area of 76.0 square miles (196.8 km^{2}), of which 52.1 square miles (135.0 km^{2}) is land and 23.9 square miles (61.8 km^{2}) (31.39%) is water.

A 2004-2006 survey of Hunter's western six-mile square described it thus:

The topography is gently rolling and the elevation ranges from approximately 1300 to 1420 feet above sea level. The upland is timbered with the predominant species being pine, oak, maple, basswood, spruce, alder and tamarack. The majority of swampland and several lakes in this township were flooded in the 1920's behind a dam built by Northern States Power Company on the Chippewa River, and formed what is known as the Chippewa Flowage.

Vehicle access is by County Highways B, CC and numerous township roads. The area is predominantly used for logging and recreational activities which include hiking, hunting, snowmobiling, fishing, and other various water sports.

== History ==
In August of 1855, a crew working for the U.S. government surveyed the section corners of the area that would become Hunter, walking through the woods and swamps, measuring with chain and compass. When done, the deputy surveyor filed this general description for the western six-mile (10 km) square that constitutes the majority of modern Hunter:

The surface of this Township is generally broken the Soil is poor(?) 3rd rate - being very Sandy (produ?) - and very little vegetation. The Timber is Principally White and Yellow Pine poor quality and Tamarack. There are many Tamarack Swamps and Marshes most of which are large and all unfit for Cultivation. The Township is well watered by numerous Streams and Lakes. There are no Settlers in this Township.

== Demographics ==
As of the census of 2000, there were 765 people, 334 households, and 231 families residing in the town. The population density was 14.7 people per square mile (5.7/km^{2}). There were 887 housing units at an average density of 17.0 per square mile (6.6/km^{2}). The racial makeup of the town was 62.75% White, 35.82% Native American, and 1.44% from two or more races. Hispanic or Latino of any race were 1.05% of the population.

There were 334 households, out of which 21.0% had children under the age of 18 living with them, 50.6% were married couples living together, 12.3% had a female householder with no husband present, and 30.8% were non-families. 25.1% of all households were made up of individuals, and 6.9% had someone living alone who was 65 years of age or older. The average household size was 2.29 and the average family size was 2.68.

In the town, the population was spread out, with 20.9% under the age of 18, 5.5% from 18 to 24, 24.2% from 25 to 44, 31.5% from 45 to 64, and 17.9% who were 65 years of age or older. The median age was 45 years. For every 100 females, there were 104.5 males. For every 100 females age 18 and over, there were 109.3 males.

The median income for a household in the town was $30,208, and the median income for a family was $29,702. Males had a median income of $24,821 versus $20,486 for females. The per capita income for the town was $16,309. About 13.0% of families and 14.9% of the population were below the poverty line, including 23.4% of those under age 18 and 6.6% of those age 65 or over.
