= We're Not Robots... =

Studio album by Edgewater
- Released: March 17, 2006
- Length: 36:08
- Label: Self-released
- Producers: Edgewater and Mitch Lerner

Edgewater chronology
South of Sideways (2004)	We're Not Robots... (2006)

Singles from We're Not Robots...
- 1. "Caught in the Moment" Released: July 11, 2006

We're Not Robots... is the fourth and final album by the Dallas hard rock band Edgewater. It was their only release after parting ways with Wind-up Records. The album was independently produced.

== Track listing ==
All tracks written by Matt Moseman, Micah Creel, Justin Middleton, Ricky Wolking and Jeremy "Worm" Rees.

1. "Get it Right" – 3:12
2. "Caught in the Moment" – 2:52
3. "I Can't Breathe" – 3:41
4. "Rock is Dead" – 4:02
5. "S.O.S." – 3:42
6. "Apples & Oranges – 3:30
7. "Engage" – 4:19
8. "U" – 3:33
9. "S.O.B." – 2:40
10. "Digging for Sounds" – 4:29

== Personnel ==
- Ricky D. Wolking - bass
- Jeremy W. Rees - drums
- Matthew James Moseman - vocals
- Justin Adam Middleton - guitar
- Michah Joseph Creel - guitar
