= Yarnell, Wisconsin =

- Unincorporated community
- Location within Wisconsin Location within the United States
- Coordinates: 45°43′37″N 91°25′10″W
- Country: United States
- State: Wisconsin
- County: Sawyer
- Elevation: 1,444 ft (440 m)
- Time zone: UTC-6 (Central (CST))
  - Summer (DST): UTC-5 (CDT)
- Area codes: 715 & 534
- GNIS feature ID: 1577896

Yarnell (/jɑːrˈnɛl/ yar-NEL) is an unincorporated community in the towns of Couderay and Edgewater, Sawyer County, Wisconsin, United States. Yarnell is 7.5 miles (12.1 km) southwest of the village of Couderay.

== History ==
A post office called Yarnell was established in 1915, and remained in operation until it was discontinued in 1933. The community was named for the Yarnell family, local settlers.
