= Edgewater (album) =

Studio album by Edgewater
- Released: November 23, 1999
- Recorded: 1999
- Genre: Post-grunge; hard rock; alternative metal
- Length: 49:31
- Label: Self-released
- Producer: Edgewater

Edgewater chronology
Edgewater (1999)	Lifter (2001)

Edgewater, released in 1999, is the first album for the Dallas, Texas-based band Edgewater. The album was recorded independently, and some of its tracks were included on its follow-up, as well as the band's Wind-up debut.

== Track listing ==
All tracks written by Matt Moseman, Adam Leydig, Micah Creel, Cameron Woolf, and Jeremy "Worm" Rees.

1. "Exposure" – 3:55
2. "Selfish" – 5:08
3. "Down Communication" – 3:51
4. "Gone By December" – 3:57
5. "Squeeze" – 3:42
6. "Submerged – 3:30
7. "Asteroid" – 6:43
8. "Enemy" – 4:47
9. "Tres Quatros" – 5:45
10. "As If You Know Me" – 4:17
11. "Anthem" – 3:39

== Personnel ==
- Matt Moseman - vocals
- Micah Creel - guitar
- Cameron Woolf - bass
- Jeremy "Worm" Rees - drums
