= Edgewater, Wisconsin =

- Town
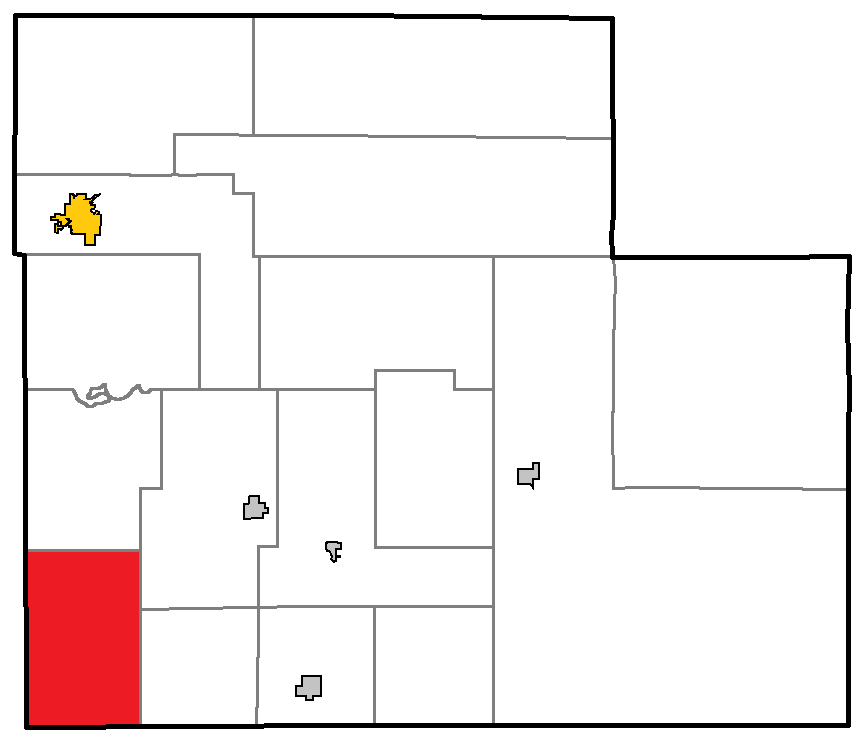
- Location of Edgewater, within Sawyer County
- Coordinates: 45°42′27″N 91°29′44″W
- Country: United States
- State: Wisconsin
- County: Sawyer

Area
  - Total: 52.3 sq mi (135.5 km^{2})
  - Land: 47.2 sq mi (122.2 km^{2})
  - Water: 5.1 sq mi (13.3 km^{2})
- Elevation: 1,293 ft (394 m)

Population (2020)
  - Total: 565
  - Density: 12.0/sq mi (4.62/km^{2})
- Time zone: UTC-6 (Central (CST))
  - Summer (DST): UTC-5 (CDT)
- Area codes: 715 & 534
- FIPS code: 55-22625
- GNIS feature ID: 1583134

Edgewater is a town in Sawyer County, Wisconsin, United States. The population was 565 at the 2020 census. The unincorporated communities of Edgewater and Wooddale are located in the town. The unincorporated community of Yarnell is also located partially in the town.

== Geography ==
According to the United States Census Bureau, the town has a total area of 52.3 square miles (135.5 km^{2}), of which 47.2 square miles (122.2 km^{2}) is land and 5.2 square miles (13.3 km^{2}) (9.84%) is water.

== Demographics ==
As of the census of 2000, there were 586 people, 245 households, and 184 families residing in the town. The population density was 12.4 people per square mile (4.8/km^{2}). There were 640 housing units at an average density of 13.6 per square mile (5.2/km^{2}). The racial makeup of the town was 98.12% White, 0.68% Native American, 0.17% Pacific Islander, 0.17% from other races, and 0.85% from two or more races. Hispanic or Latino of any race were 1.54% of the population.

There were 245 households, out of which 23.3% had children under the age of 18 living with them, 65.3% were married couples living together, 4.9% had a female householder with no husband present, and 24.5% were non-families. 21.2% of all households were made up of individuals, and 6.5% had someone living alone who was 65 years of age or older. The average household size was 2.39 and the average family size was 2.70.

In the town, the population was spread out, with 20.5% under the age of 18, 4.1% from 18 to 24, 22.5% from 25 to 44, 34.8% from 45 to 64, and 18.1% who were 65 years of age or older. The median age was 47 years. For every 100 females, there were 110.0 males. For every 100 females age 18 and over, there were 111.8 males.

The median income for a household in the town was $38,542, and the median income for a family was $41,786. Males had a median income of $32,500 versus $21,083 for females. The per capita income for the town was $18,907. About 5.2% of families and 7.4% of the population were below the poverty line, including 2.9% of those under age 18 and 13.1% of those age 65 or over.
