= Diane Vertin =

American academic administrator

Diane Vertin is an American academic administrator who is the chief operating officer of College of St. Scholastica. She was previously president of Lac Courte Oreilles Ojibwa Community College.

== Life ==
Vertin was born to Matt and Gloria Vertin. She earned a bachelor's degree in business administration, a master's degree in vocational education, and an Ed.D. (2001) in education from the University of Minnesota. Her dissertation was titled, Educational Change Process of a Two-year College: The Attitudes and Perceptions of Administrators and Faculty of Becoming a Learner-centered College. Thomas D. Peacock and James R. Stone, III were her doctoral advisors.

At the University of Wisconsin–Superior and the University of Minnesota Duluth, Vertin worked as an assistant dean of customized training, program director, and adjunct faculty member. For three years, she was the dean of general education, personal services, and health at the Wisconsin Indianhead Technical College (WITC), Superior campus. Vertin became the dean of business and marketing for the WITC Superior campus. In 2004, she succeeded Jann Brill as the vice president for academic affairs and Superior campus administrator. In 2013, she was succeeded by Bonny Copenhaver.

Vertin was president of Lac Courte Oreilles Ojibwa Community College until she resigned in November 2017. According to the Wisconsin Indian Education Association, during her tenure, she preserved indigenous cultural heritage and advanced educational opportunities for Native American students. She was succeeded by interim president Barbara Lundberg. In July 2018, Vertin was named the interim vice president for academic affairs at College of St. Scholastica. She serves as its chief operating officer.

Vertin has a son and is married to Frank Guldbrandsen.
