= Lifter (album) =

Studio album by Edgewater
- Released: November 1, 2001
- Recorded: 2001
- Genre: Post-grunge; nu metal
- Length: 37:23
- Label: Self-released
- Producer: Eric Delegard and Edgewater

Edgewater chronology
| Edgewater (1999) | Lifter (2001) | South of Sideways (2004) |

Lifter is the second album for the Dallas, Texas-based band Edgewater released in 2001.

The album was recorded independently and some of its tracks were included on their first release, as well as their Wind-up debut, South of Sideways.

== Track listing ==
All tracks written by Matt Moseman, Micah Creel, Justin Middleton, Cameron Woolf, and Jeremy "Worm" Rees, except for "I Won't Back Down".

1. "Sweet Suffocation" – 3:17
2. "Eyes Wired Shut" – 3:14
3. "Break Me Out" – 3:56
4. "Neglected" – 4:05
5. "Tres Quatros" – 3:44
6. "Ode To You" – 4:00
7. "One Perfect Something" – 3:32
8. "Echo" – 3:33
9. "I Won't Back Down" – 2:58 (Tom Petty, Jeff Lynne)
10. "Lifter" – 4:58

== Personnel ==
- Matt Moseman - vocals
- Micah Creel - guitar
- Justin Middleton - guitar
- Cameron Woolf - bass
- Jeremy "Worm" Rees - drums
