= Edgewater (community), Wisconsin =

Edgewater, Wisconsin
- Unincorporated community
- Location within Wisconsin Location within the United States
- Coordinates: 45°44′32″N 91°28′31″W
- Country: United States
- State: Wisconsin
- County: Sawyer
- Elevation: 1,266 ft (386 m)
- Time zone: UTC-6 (Central (CST))
  - Summer (DST): UTC-5 (CDT)
- ZIP code: 54834
- Area codes: 715 & 534
- GNIS feature ID: 1564444

Edgewater is an unincorporated community located in the town of Edgewater, Sawyer County, Wisconsin, United States. Edgewater is located along County Highway F on the northern shore of Lake Chetac, 9 miles (14 km) west-southwest of Couderay. Edgewater had a post office, which closed on October 21, 1995.
