= Edgewater Hotel =

Edgewater Hotel or The Edgewater may refer to:

- The Edgewater (Madison, Wisconsin), a historic Art Moderne-style hotel
- The Edgewater (Seattle, Washington), a hotel
- Edgewater Beach Hotel, Edgewater, Chicago, Illinois
- Edgewater Gulf Hotel, Biloxi, Mississippi
- Edgewater Hotel and Casino, Laughlin, Nevada,
