= Bass Lake, Sawyer County, Wisconsin =

Bass Lake, Wisconsin
- Town
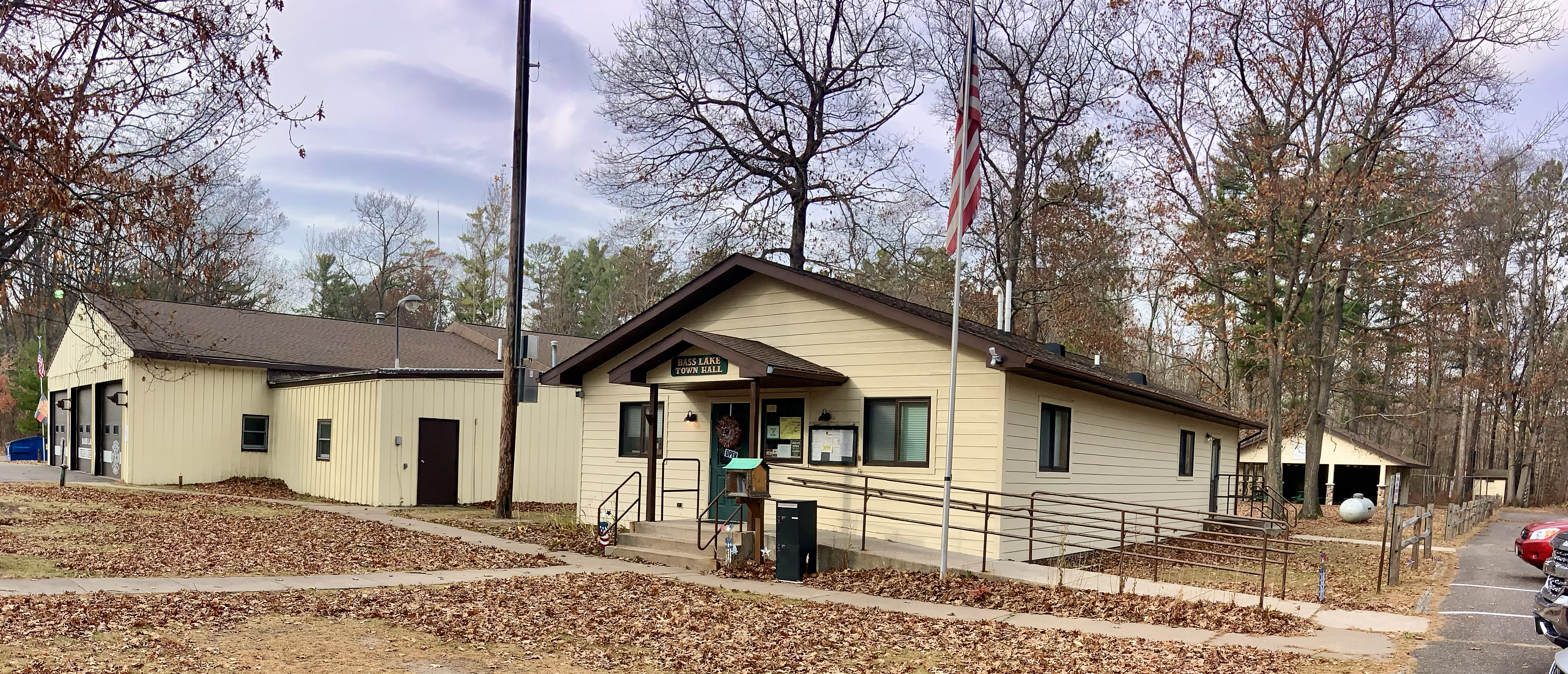
- Town hall

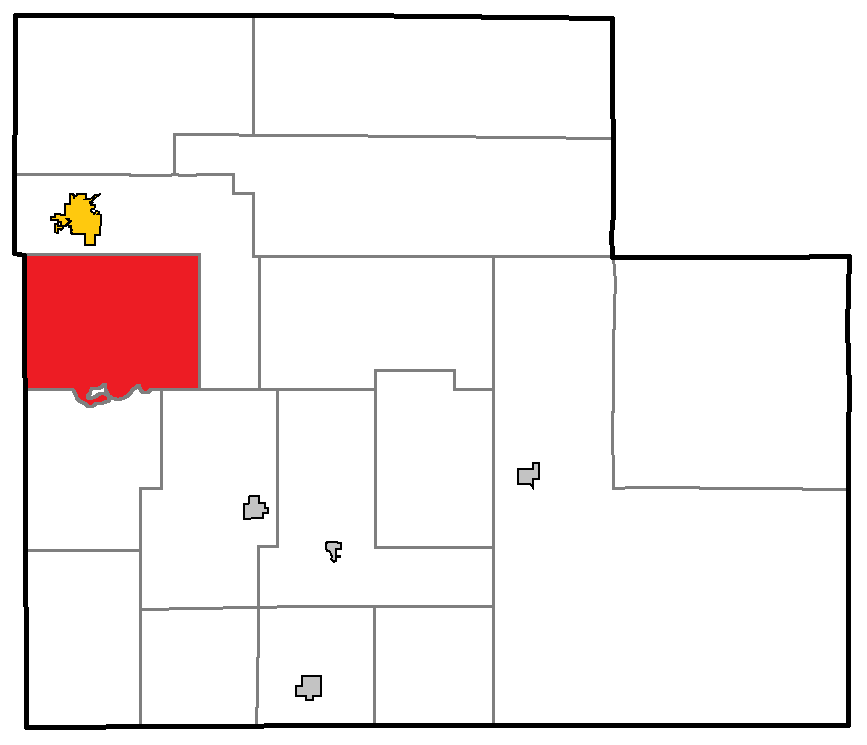
- Location of Bass Lake, within Sawyer County, Wisconsin
- Coordinates: 45°55′5″N 91°25′36″W
- Country: United States
- State: Wisconsin
- County: Sawyer

Area
  - Total: 61.7 sq mi (159.7 km^{2})
  - Land: 45.9 sq mi (119.0 km^{2})
  - Water: 15.7 sq mi (40.7 km^{2})
- Elevation: 1,299 ft (396 m)

Population (2020)
  - Total: 2,731
  - Density: 59.44/sq mi (22.95/km^{2})
- Time zone: UTC-6 (Central (CST))
  - Summer (DST): UTC-5 (CDT)
- Area codes: 715 & 534
- FIPS code: 55-05200
- GNIS feature ID: 1582761

Bass Lake is a town in Sawyer County, Wisconsin, United States. The population was 2,731 at the 2020 census. The census-designated place of Little Round Lake is located in the town. The unincorporated community of Northwoods Beach is also located in the town.

== Geography ==
According to the United States Census Bureau, the town has a total area of 61.7 square miles (160 km^{2}), of which 46.0 sq mi (119 km^{2}) is land and 15.7 square miles (41 km^{2}) (25.49%) is water. The town is located approximately six miles southeast of the city of Hayward, the primary commercial and retail center of the area. It contains a number of lakes including Grindstone Lake, one of three large natural lakes located to the south and east of the city of Hayward, the other two being Lac Courte Oreilles and Round Lake.

== Demographics ==
As of the census of 2000, there were 2,244 people, 830 households, and 630 families residing in the town. The population density was 48.8 people per square mile (18.9/km^{2}). There were 1,836 housing units at an average density of 40.0 per square mile (15.4/km^{2}). The racial makeup of the town was 59.98% White, 0.04% African American, 37.97% Native American, 0.18% Asian, 0.36% from other races, and 1.47% from two or more races. Hispanic or Latino of any race were 1.20% of the population.

There were 830 households, out of which 35.2% had children under the age of 18 living with them, 52.2% were married couples living together, 16.9% had a female householder with no husband present, and 24.0% were non-families. 18.9% of all households were made up of individuals, and 8.1% had someone living alone who was 65 years of age or older. The average household size was 2.70 and the average family size was 3.04.

In the town, the population was spread out, with 30.2% under the age of 18, 5.9% from 18 to 24, 25.8% from 25 to 44, 25.6% from 45 to 64, and 12.4% who were 65 years of age or older. The median age was 37 years. For every 100 females, there were 96.0 males. For every 100 females age 18 and over, there were 94.8 males.

The median income for a household in the town was $31,274, and the median income for a family was $32,179. Males had a median income of $28,750 versus $20,977 for females. The per capita income for the town was $15,026. About 13.8% of families and 17.4% of the population were below the poverty line, including 24.6% of those under age 18 and 5.8% of those age 65 or over.
