= Edgewater (band) =

American rock band

- Origin: Dallas, Texas, United States
- Genres: Post-grunge; nu metal; alternative metal; alternative rock
- Years active: 1997–2009
- Label: Wind-up
- Past members: Matt Moseman; Micah Creel; Justin Middleton; Jeremy "Worm" Rees; Ricky Wolking; Cameron Woolf; Christopher Borders; Adam Leydig
- Website: facebook official

Edgewater was a five-piece rock band from the Dallas, Texas area that began in 1997. The band's style was not aimed to fit into any particular genre. According to drummer Jeremy Rees, "Our music is like our band name. It's got that edge to it and it's crunchy and really thick in the hardest places, but the overlays and melodies flow like water over the top."

== Biography ==
=== Formation and self-titled album: 1997–2000 ===
In March 1997, Matt Moseman, Cameron Woolf, Adam Leydig, and Christopher Borders formed Edgewater. The band began as a four-piece with Moseman handling both vocals and playing rhythm guitar, with Leydig as the lead guitarist, Borders on drums, and Woolf playing bass. In March 1998, Micah Creel and Jeremy Rees joined, replacing Borders on drums. In June 1999, Justin "Shorty" Middleton of 40% would join the band on rhythm guitar, with Moseman focusing solely on vocals. The band would release their self-titled album in July 1999. The band began headlining local and regional venues in support of their album, which was released locally.

=== Lifter And South of Sideways: 2001–2004 ===
The band released Lifter in 2001, and began touring in support of the album. Woolf left the band in October 2002. In January 2003, Ricky Wolking joined, replacing Woolf on bass.

In June 2003, the band signed to major label Wind-up Records and began working on their major label debut. In April 2004, South of Sideways was released. The first single, "Eyes Wired Shut" got airplay on many radio stations and was also the theme for Backlash 2004. It was featured on the Soundtrack for the movie The Punisher. They would then tour nationally with Finger Eleven, Three Days Grace, Seether, Default, and Alter Bridge.

=== We Are Not Robots... and disbandment: 2005–2009 ===
In June 2005, the band parted ways with Wind-up Records and began working on an independent release. The album was named We're Not Robots.... It was released in August 2006 through Forevergreen records and distributed by Rockridge music.

The band remained inactive for the last part of 2007 and through mid-2008 until an announcement on their Myspace revealed that they were working on new material for a 2009 album release. On July 2, 2009, however, the band posted a message entitled "Goodbye and Farewell", announcing their disbandment.

On December 27, 2016, former lead vocalist Matt Moseman died at the age of 43 following a stroke he suffered three days earlier. On March 16, 2017, a memorial live show was held in Texas to celebrate the life of Moseman. It featured former members of the band performing songs with guest vocalists.

== Members ==
Final line-up

- Matt Moseman – lead vocals (1997–2009)
- Micah Creel – guitar (1998–2009)
- Justin Middleton – guitar (1999–2009)
- Jeremy "Worm" Rees – drums (1998–2009)
- Ricky Wolking – bass (2003–2009)

Former members

- Cameron Woolf – bass (1997–2002)
- Christopher Borders – drums (1997–1998)
- Adam Leydig – guitar (1997–1999)

== Discography ==
=== Albums ===
- 1999: Edgewater
- 2001: Lifter
- 2004: South of Sideways
- 2006: We're Not Robots...

=== Singles ===
- 2004: Eyes Wired Shut
- 2004: Inhale
- 2006: Caught in the Moment

=== Soundtrack appearances ===
- 2004: The Punisher: The Album
