= Edgewater, Broward County, Florida =

CDP in Florida, US

Edgewater
- Neighborhood
- Location within the state of Florida
- Coordinates: 26°3′55″N 80°12′1″W
- Country: United States
- State: Florida
- County: Broward
- City: Dania Beach

Area
  - Total: 0.6 sq mi (1.6 km^{2})
  - Land: 0.6 sq mi (1.6 km^{2})

Population (2000)
  - Total: 803
  - Density: 1,300/sq mi (520/km^{2})
- Time zone: UTC-5 (Eastern (EST))
  - Summer (DST): UTC-4 (EST)

Edgewater was a census-designated place (CDP) in Broward County, Florida, United States. The population was 803 at the 2000 census. It is now an incorporated neighborhood of Dania Beach.

== Geography ==
Edgewater is located at 26°3′55″N 80°12′1″W (26.065316, −80.200268).

According to the United States Census Bureau, the CDP has a total area of 0.6 square miles (1.6 km^{2}), all of which is land.

== Demographics ==
As of the census of 2000, there were 803 people, 359 households, and 194 families residing in the CDP. The population density was 1,348.0 people/km^{2} (3,491 people/mi^{2}). There were 449 housing units at an average density of 753.7 units/km^{2} (1,952 units/mi^{2}). The racial makeup of the CDP was 89.66% White, 2.49% African American, 0.75% Asian, 0.37% Pacific Islander, 4.61% from other races, and 2.12% from two or more races. Hispanic or Latino of any race were 14.07% of the population.

There were 359 households, out of which 18.4% had children under the age of 18 living with them, 37.3% were married couples living together, 11.4% had a female householder with no husband present, and 45.7% were non-families. 34.0% of all households were made up of individuals, and 10.0% had someone living alone who was 65 years of age or older. The average household size was 2.24 and the average family size was 2.81.

In the CDP, the population was spread out, with 17.4% under the age of 18, 6.6% from 18 to 24, 30.9% from 25 to 44, 30.6% from 45 to 64, and 14.4% who were 65 years of age or older. The median age was 42 years. For every 100 females, there were 109.1 males. For every 100 females age 18 and over, there were 111.1 males.

The median income for a household in the CDP was $26,492, and the median income for a family was $26,958. Males had a median income of $45,500 versus $24,922 for females. The per capita income for the CDP was $16,922. About 13.6% of families and 23.3% of the population were below the poverty line, including 27.9% of those under age 18 and 15.8% of those age 65 or over.

As of 2000, English as a first language accounted for 66.91%, while Spanish as a mother tongue made up 33.08% of the population.
