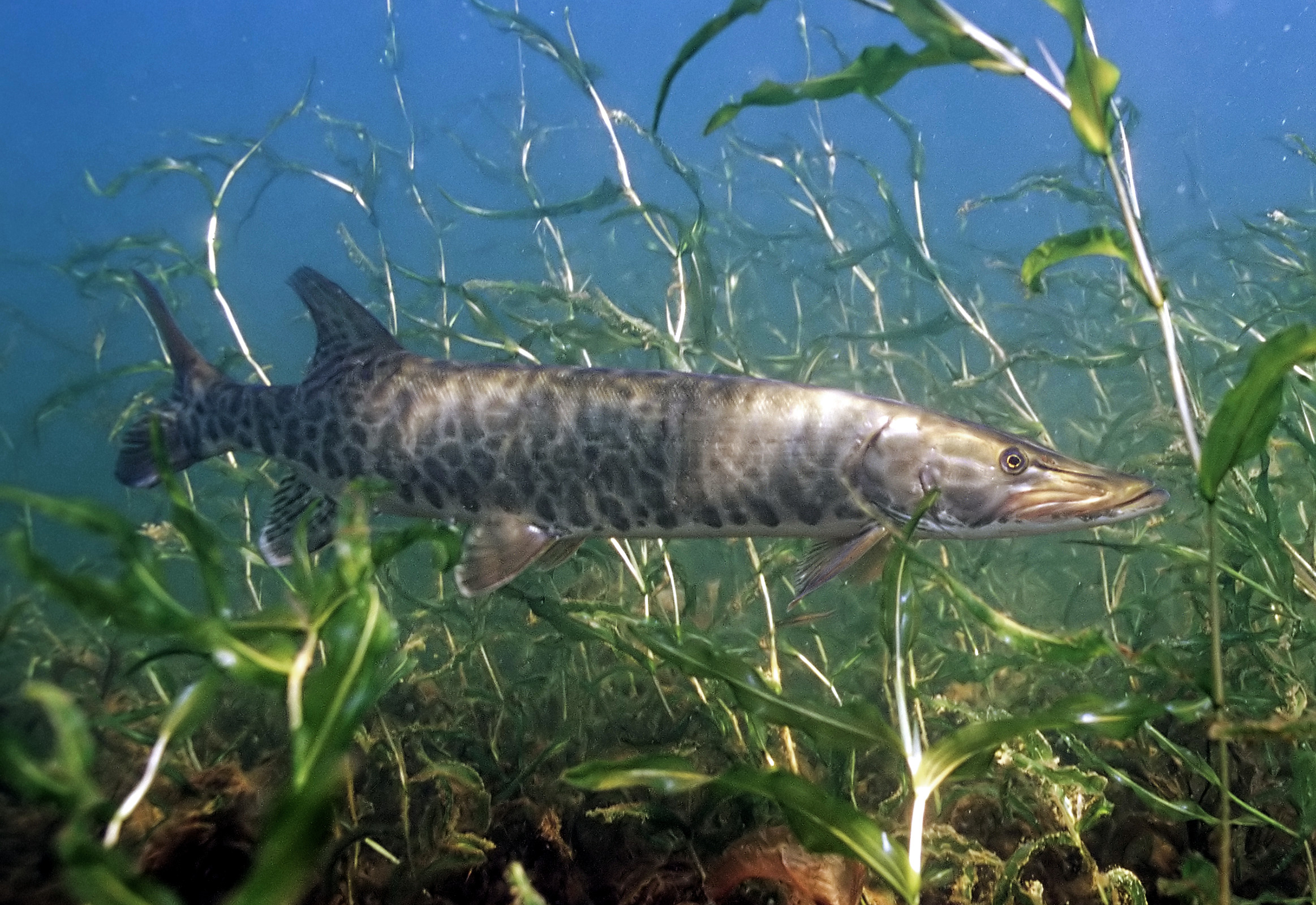

Conservation status
- Least Concern (IUCN 3.1)

- Secure (NatureServe)

Scientific classification
- Kingdom: Animalia
- Phylum: Chordata
- Class: Actinopterygii
- Division: Teleostei
- Order: Salmoniformes
- Family: Esocidae
- Genus: Esox
- Species: E. masquinongy

Binomial name
- Esox masquinongy Mitchill, 1824

= Muskellunge =

Muskellunge (Muskie)

Species of fish

The muskellunge (Esox masquinongy), often shortened to muskie, musky, ski, or lunge, is a species of large freshwater predatory fish native to North America. It is the largest member of the pike family, Esocidae.

== Etymology ==
The name "muskellunge" originates from the Ojibwe word maashkinoozhe, meaning "ugly pike". The Algonquin word maskinunga is borrowed into the Canadian French words masquinongé or maskinongé. In English, before settling on the common name "muskellunge", there were at least 94 common names applied to this species, including but not limited to: muskelunge, muscallonge, muskallonge, milliganong, maskinonge, maskalonge, mascalonge, maskalung, muskinunge and masquenongez.

== Subspecies and hybrids ==
Though interbreeding with other pike species can complicate the classification of some individuals, zoologists usually recognize up to three subspecies of muskellunge.

- The Great Lakes muskellunge or spotted muskellunge (E. m. masquinongy) is the most common variety in the Great Lakes basin and surrounding area. The spots on the body form oblique rows.
- The Chautauqua muskellunge or barred muskellunge (E. m. ohioensis) is known from the Ohio River system, Chautauqua Lake, Lake Ontario, and the St Lawrence River.
- The clear muskellunge (E. m. immaculatus) is most common in the inland lakes of Minnesota, Wisconsin, northwestern Ontario, and southeastern Manitoba.

The tiger muskellunge (E. masquinongy × lucius or E. lucius × masquinongy) is a hybrid of the muskie and northern pike. Hybrids are sterile, although females sometimes unsuccessfully engage in spawning motions. Some hybrids are artificially produced and planted for anglers to catch. Tiger muskies grow faster than pure muskies, but do not attain the ultimate size of their pure relatives, as the tiger muskie does not live as long.

== Description ==
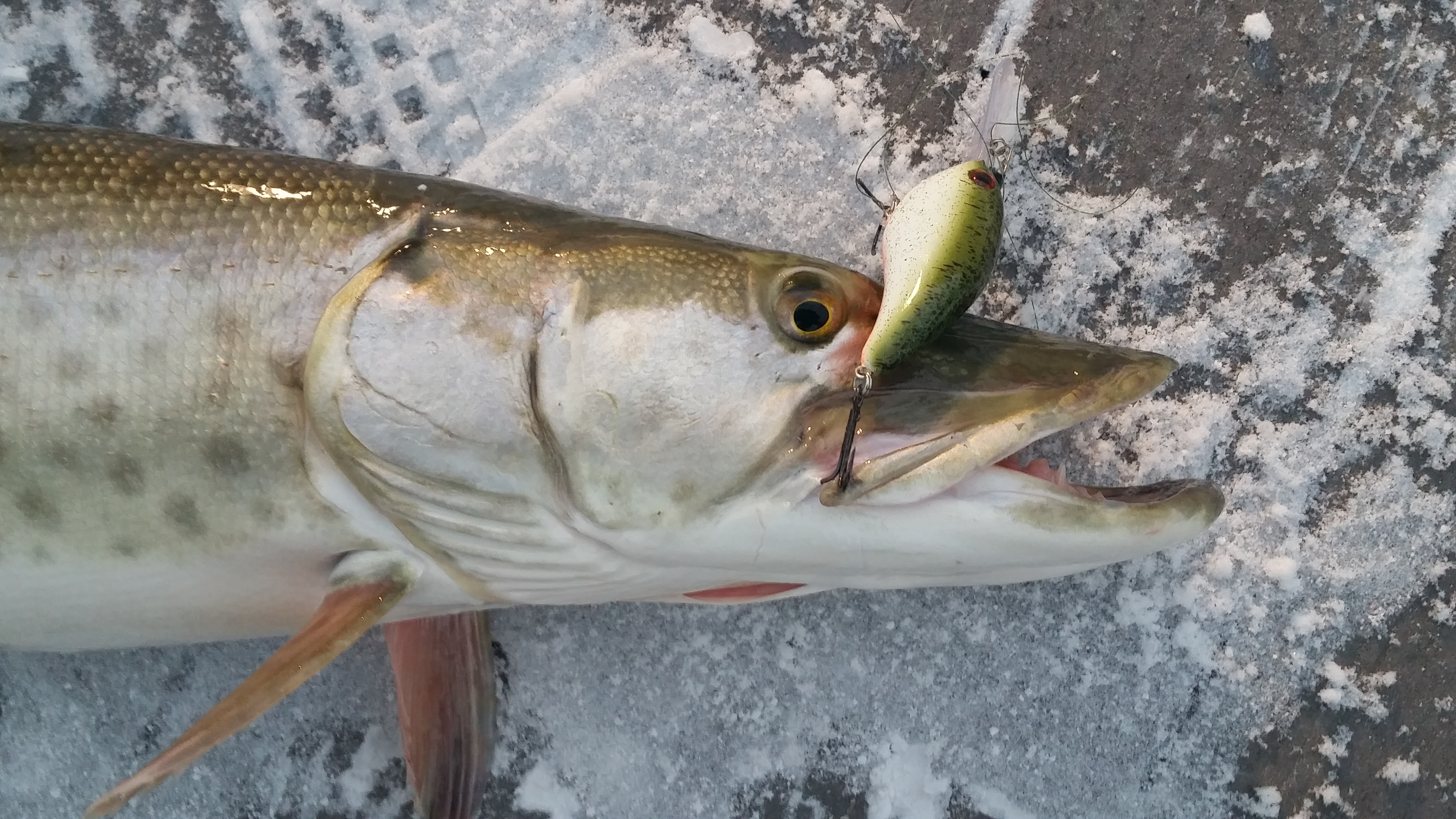
A spotted muskellunge caught in Lake St. Clair during winter.

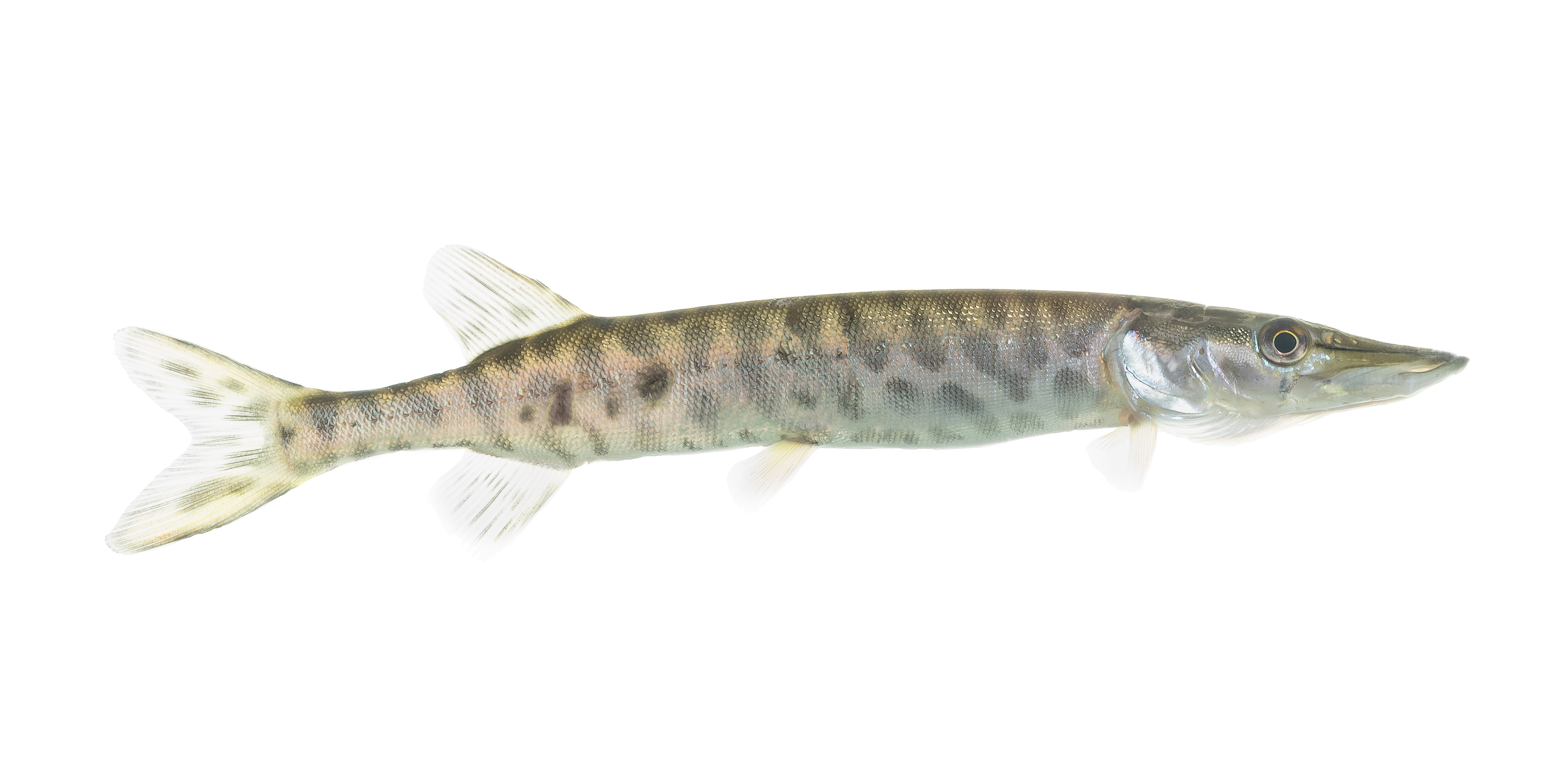
Juvenile

Muskellunge closely resemble other esocids such as the northern pike (Esox lucius) and American pickerel (E. americanus) in both appearance and behavior. Like the northern pike and other aggressive pikes, the body plan is typical of ambush predators with an elongated body, flat head, and dorsal, pelvic, and anal fins set far back on the body. Muskellunge are typically 70–120 cm (28–48 inches) long and weigh 7–16.5 kg (15–36 lb), though some have reached up to 1.8 m (6 ft) and almost 30 kg (70 lb). A muskellunge with a weight of 27.8 kg (61.25 pounds) was caught in November 2000 in Georgian Bay. The fish are a light silver, brown, or green, with dark vertical stripes on the flank, which may tend to break up into spots. In some cases, markings may be absent altogether, especially in fish from turbid waters. This is in contrast to northern pike, which have dark bodies with light markings. A reliable method to distinguish the two similar species is by counting the sensory pores on the underside of the mandible. A muskie will have seven or more per side, while the northern pike never has more than six. The lobes of the caudal (tail) fin in muskellunge come to a sharper point, while those of northern pike are more generally rounded. In addition, unlike pike, muskies have no scales on the lower half of their opercula.

Anglers seek large muskies as trophies or for sport. In places where muskie are not native, such as in Maine, anglers are encouraged not to release the fish back into the water because of their negative impact on native populations of trout and other smaller fish species.

== Habitat ==
Muskellunge are found in oligotrophic and mesotrophic lakes and large rivers from Michigan, Wisconsin, and Minnesota through the Great Lakes region, Chautauqua Lake in western New York, north into Canada, throughout most of the St Lawrence River drainage, and northward throughout the upper Mississippi valley, although the species also extends as far south as Chattanooga in the Tennessee River valley. Also, a small population is found in the Broad River in South Carolina. Several North Georgia reservoirs also have healthy stocked populations of muskie. They are also found in the Red River drainage of the Hudson Bay basin. Muskie were introduced to western Saint John River in the late 1960s and have now spread to many connecting waterways in northern Maine. The Pineview Reservoir in Utah is one of three Utah locations where the hybrid Tiger muskellunge is found.

They prefer clear waters where they lurk along weed edges, rock outcrops, or other structures to rest. A fish forms two distinct home ranges in summer: a shallow range and a deeper one. The shallow range is generally much smaller than the deeper range due to shallow water heating up. A muskie continually patrols the ranges in search of available food in the appropriate conditions of water temperature.

== Diet ==
Muskies are ambush predators who will swiftly bite their prey and then swallow it head first. Muskellunge are the top predator in any body of water where they occur and they will eat larger prey than most other freshwater fish. They eat all varieties of fish present in their ecosystem (including other muskellunge), along with the occasional insect, muskrat, rat, mouse, frog, or duck. They are capable of taking prey up to two-thirds of their body length due to their large stomachs. There have even been reports of large muskellunge attacking small dogs and even humans, although most of these reports are greatly exaggerated.

== Length and weight ==
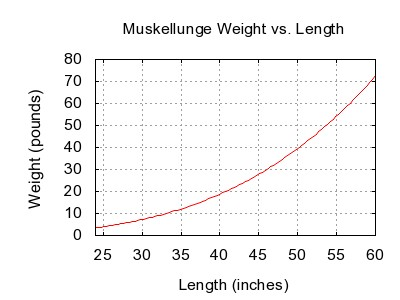
Graph showing weight–length relationship for muskellunge

As muskellunge grow longer they increase in weight, but the relationship between length and weight is not linear. The relationship between them can be expressed by a power-law equation:

$$W = cL^b\!\,$$

The exponent b is close to 3.0 for all species, and c is a constant for each species. For muskellunge, b = 3.325, higher than for many common species, and c = 0.000089 pounds per cubic inch or 0.0025 g/cm^{3}.

According to the International Game Fish Association (IGFA) the largest muskellunge on record was caught by Cal Johnson in Lac Courte Oreilles (recognized as Lake Courte Oreilles by the association), Hayward, Wisconsin, United States, on July 24, 1949. The fish weighed 30.5 kg (67 lb 8 oz) and was 153 cm (60.25 inches) in length, and 84–86 cm (33–34 inches) in girth.

== Behavior ==
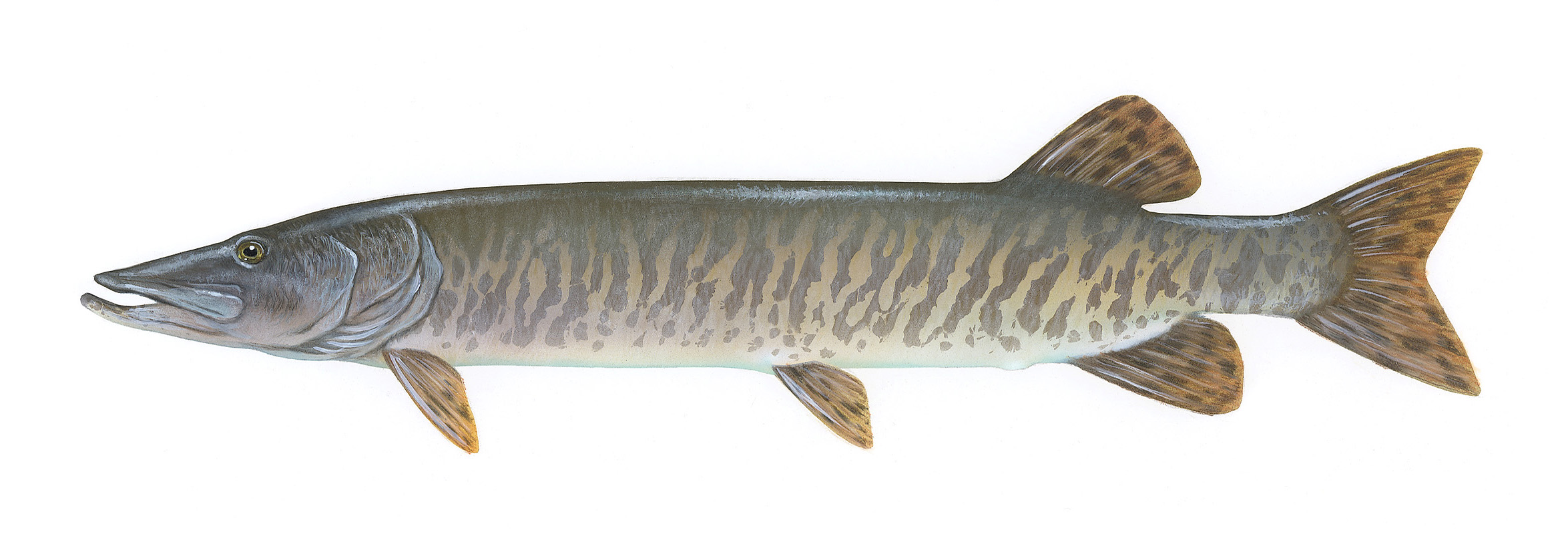
Illustration of a Muskellunge

Muskellunge are sometimes gregarious, forming small schools in distinct territories. Muskellunge feeding behavior is directly synchronized with the lunar cycle. During both full and new moons, an increase in feeding activity can be attributed to the increase of moonlight, as it most similarly simulates daytime feeding. They spawn in mid- to late spring, somewhat later than northern pike, over shallow, vegetated areas. A rock or sand bottom is preferred for spawning so the eggs do not sink into the mud and suffocate. The males arrive first and attempt to establish dominance over a territory. Spawning may last from five to 10 days and occurs mainly at night. The eggs are negatively buoyant and slightly adhesive; they adhere to plants and the bottom of the lake. Soon afterward, they are abandoned by the adults. Those embryos which are not eaten by fish, insects, or crayfish hatch within two weeks. The larvae live on yolk until the mouth is fully developed, when they begin to feed on copepods and other zooplankton. They soon begin to prey upon fish. Juveniles generally attain a length of 30 cm (12 inches) by November of their first year.

== Predators ==
Adult muskellunge are apex predators where they occur naturally. Only humans and (rarely) large birds of prey such as bald eagles (Haliaeetus leucocephalus) pose a threat to an adult. But juveniles are consumed by other muskies, northern pike, bass, trout, and occasionally birds of prey. The muskellunge's low reproductive rate and slow growth render populations highly vulnerable to overfishing. This has prompted some jurisdictions to institute artificial propagation programs in an attempt to maintain otherwise unsustainably high rates of angling effort and habitat destruction.

== Attacks on humans ==
Although very rare, muskie attacks on humans do occur on occasion.
