= Namekagon River =

River in Wisconsin, United States

Coordinates: 46.08772°N 92.18075°W

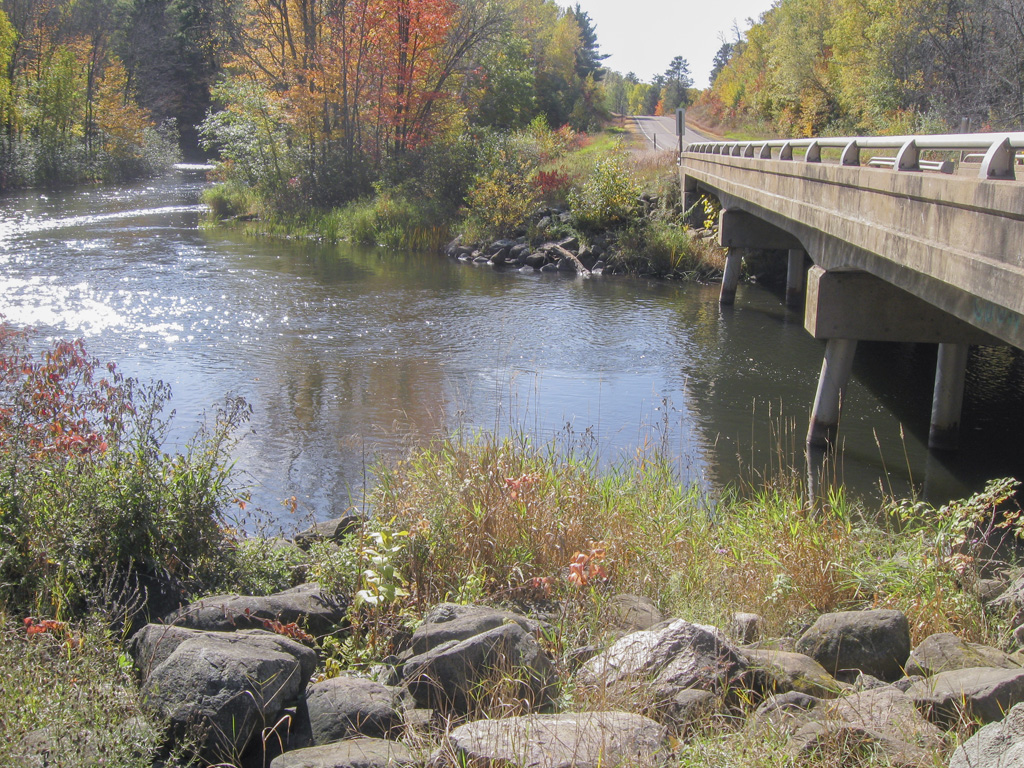
- View of the Namekagon River and County E Bridge.

Physical characteristics
- Length: 101 mi (163 km)

National Wild and Scenic River
- Part of: Saint Croix National Scenic Riverway

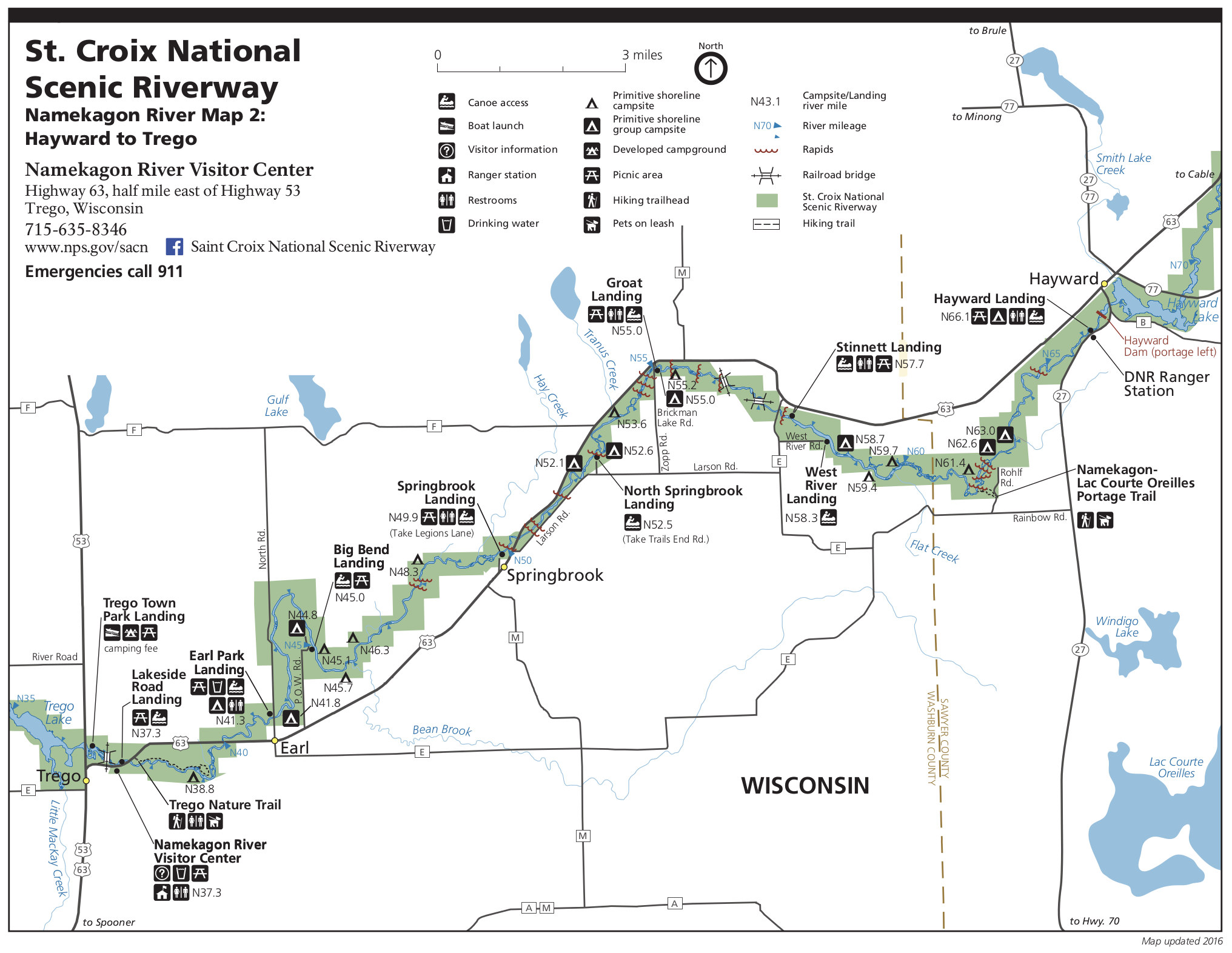
Namekagon River route from Hayward to Trego

The Namekagon River (pronounced NAM-uh-KAH-gun) is a tributary of the St. Croix River. It is 101 miles (163 km) long and is located in northwestern Wisconsin in the United States. Its course is protected as part of the St. Croix National Scenic Riverway.

The river's name is derived from the Ojibwe language Namekaagong-ziibi, meaning "river at the place abundant with sturgeons". According to the Geographic Names Information System, the river's name has also been spelled Namakagon, Namekagan, and Namekagun; the United States Board on Geographic Names issued a decision setting "Namekagon" as official English transliteration of the river's name in 1933.

== Course ==
The Namekagon River issues from Lake Namakagon in southeastern Bayfield County and flows southwestwardly through Sawyer and Washburn counties, past Hayward, and northwestwardly into Burnett County, where it joins the St. Croix, 45 miles (72 km) south of the city of Superior. Near its mouth it collects the Totagatic River.

== History ==
The Namekagon River was an integral part in the transportation of lumber during the timber boom of the 1800s. Before the lumber boom, the river was used as a primary form of transportation by fur-traders, explorers and missionaries. In Trego, a sign stands which says,

Here on the Great South Bend of the Namekagon was a natural camp-site, home of a band of Chippewa Indians and long used by explorers, missionaries, and fur-traders traveling the Namekagon route between the St. Croix and Chippewa rivers.

In 1767 Jonathan Carver passed this way, downstream on his way from Prairie du Chien to Lake Superior via the Namekagon, St. Croix and Brule rivers. Henry Schoolcraft passed here in 1831 en route from Lake Superior to the St. Croix.

During the 1870's [sic], ox teams hauled logging supplies on the tote road from Stillwater to Veazie Settlement, located two miles up river where the great Veazie Dam impounded water for log drives down the Namekagon to Stillwater.

=== Native American culture (pre 1831) ===
The Namekagon was used by the Ojibwe tribe as a source of food and transportation. Every May the Ojibwe used a fish dam to fish the sturgeon that took residence in the river. Large rocks blocked the sturgeon passing on either side so they would swim through the center, where fisherman would spear the fish as they swam into large baskets. The river was also used as a primary source of transportation for the Ojibwe as discovered by European explorers and fur traders. They noted there were heavily used portages between the large bodies of water. Pictographs were drawn on trees that provided information of different species of the area. On the upper portion of the river sat an Ojibwe village off of Lake Pacwawong, where the Native Americans grew wild rice on the river, as well as blueberries, pumpkins, corn, potatoes, and beans.

=== European-American culture (1831–1860) ===
Henry Schoolcraft, an explorer who lived among Native American tribes, led two different expeditions along the Namekagon. Schoolcraft described the river at northern portage near Cable, Wisconsin as being seventy-five feet wide and eighteen inches at the deepest part. The river banks were rich with large pines, hardwood and spruce. Brook Trout was in abundance along the river, and was used as a primary food source by the explorers at the time. A few years after Schoolcraft's expedition, the United States government enlisted geologists to describe the riverbed floor. The geologists found that the river bed was a mixture of thin sandy silt with gravelly riverbanks and contained a range of rock sizes from small pebbles to large boulders that sat in the middle of the river.

=== Logging (1861–1901) ===
Before the construction of the state road in 1877, the Namekagon River was a primary means of transportation. Early logging in the area was accomplished by selecting the trees closest to the river bank, and floating them down the river to the saw mill. The arrival of the railway saw an opportunity for the Lumber companies to expand the marketplaces across state lines to larger markets. In 1855, Anthony Hayward was given permission from the Wisconsin Legislature to build, operate and maintain dam sites along the Namekagon.

== Recreation ==
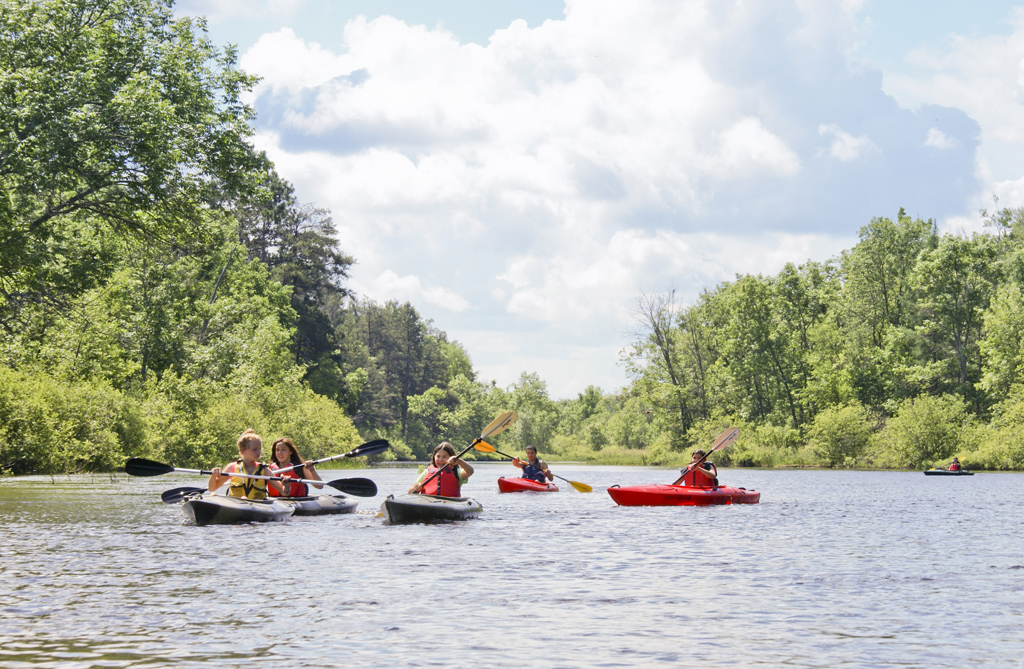
Kayaking group near Big Bend Landing on Namekagon River

The Namekagon is a site of many recreational activities such as recreational tubing, kayaking, canoeing, fishing, hiking, snowshoeing, and other activities.

== Wildlife ==
The Namekagon River offers a variety of wildlife. Most prominent wildlife are the Brook Trout. In addition, there is also walleye, bass, muskellunge, northern pike and panfish.

== See also ==
- List of Wisconsin rivers
