= Richard Thompson =

Richard Thompson may refer to:

== Arts and entertainment ==
- Richard Thompson (animator) (1914–1998), Warner Bros. cartoon animator in the 1950s
- Richard Thompson (cartoonist) (1957–2016), cartoonist who also worked as an illustrator
- Richard Thompson (musician) (born 1949), songwriter and musician
- Richard Earl Thompson (1914–1991), artist
- Rick Thompson, television series character, see list of Falling Skies characters

== Politics ==
- Sir Richard Thompson, 1st Baronet (1912–1999), British Conservative politician
- Richard Thompson (Australian politician) (1832–1906), New South Wales politician
- Richard Thompson (Maine politician) (born 1947), attorney and Democratic member of the Maine House of Representatives
- Richard Thompson (MP for Reading) (died c. 1735), British Whig politician
- Richard E. Thompson (1871–1928), member of the Mississippi State Senate
- Richard Frederick Thompson (1873–1949), farmer and political figure in Saskatchewan, Canada
- Richard Henry Thompson (1906–1964), Australian politician and Methodist lay preacher
- Richard W. Thompson (1809–1900), United States Secretary of the Navy
- Rick Thompson, member of the West Virginia House of Delegates

== Religion ==
- Richard Thompson (priest) (1648–1685), Dean of Bristol
- Richard Thomson (theologian) (died 1613), or Thompson, 17th-century theologian
- Richard L. Thompson (1947–2008), American author and Gaudiya Vaishnava religious figure

== Sports ==
- Richard Thompson (cricket administrator) (born 1966), Chairman of the England and Wales Cricket Board
- Richard Thompson (footballer, born 1969), English football player
- Richard Thompson (footballer, born 1974), English football player
- Richard Thompson (sprinter) (born 1985), Trinidad and Tobago sprinter
- Rich Thompson (outfielder) (born 1979), American baseball player
- Rich Thompson (pitcher, born 1984), Australian baseball player
- Rich Thompson (pitcher, born 1958), American baseball player
- Richard Thompson (triple jumper) (born 1969), American triple jumper, All-American for the Georgia Tech Yellow Jackets track and field team

== Other ==
- Richard Thompson (marine biologist), director of the Marine Institute at the University of Plymouth, coined the term "microplastics"
- Richard Thompson (physician) (born 1940), president of the Royal College of Physicians and formerly physician to the Queen
- Richard Thompson (Royal Navy officer) (born 1966), British admiral
- Richard F. Thompson (1930–2014), American behavioral neuroscientist
- Richard H. Thompson (philatelist) (1903–1985), American philatelist
- Richard Horner Thompson (1926–2016), U.S. Army general
- Richard M. Thomson (born 1933), Canadian banker
- Richard W. Thompson (journalist) (1865–1920), journalist and public servant in Indiana and Washington, D.C.
- Richard Thompson, former prosecutor and current president of Thomas More Law Center
- Richard Thompson, mathematician for whom the infinite Thompson groups are named

== See also ==
- Dick Thompson (disambiguation)
- Rich Thompson (disambiguation)
- Richard Thomson (disambiguation)
- Richard Tomson, British sailor
- Thompson (surname)
