= American Birkebeiner =

North American cross-country skiing race

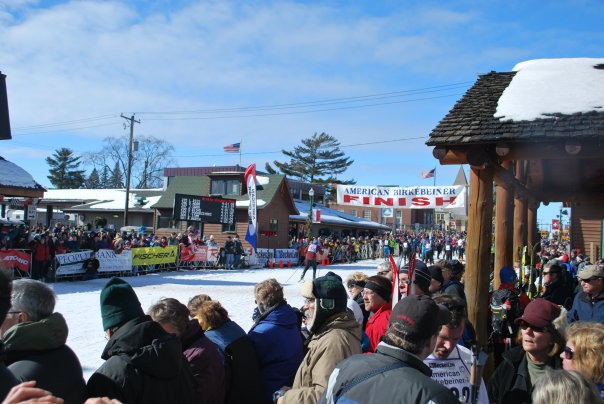
- The finish line on Main Street in Hayward, Wisconsin, February 27, 2010
- Status: Active
- Genre: Cross-country skiing race
- Date: February
- Frequency: Annual
- Locations: Cable, Wisconsin to Hayward, Wisconsin
- Country: United States
- Inaugurated: 1973
- Website: https://www.birkie.com/

The American Birkebeiner, or Birkie, is the largest cross-country skiing race in North America. It debuted in 1973 and is a founding member of the Worldloppet federation of cross-country ski marathons. The Birkie's two premier events are the 50 km (31 mi) skate and the 55 km (34 mi) classic races between the towns of Cable and Hayward in the U.S. state of Wisconsin. Each year more than 10,000 skiers participate in the Birkie, including the full-distances races, a 29 km (18 mi) Kortelopet race, and a 15 km (9.3 mi) Prince Haakon race.

== History ==
The American Birkebeiner, known colloquially as the Birkie, is held annually in February. The event was founded in 1973 by Tony Wise. Wise, who started the Telemark Ski Area in Cable, Wisconsin, in 1947, helped to popularize modern-day cross-country skiing when he built trails at Telemark in 1972. In February 1973, Wise drew on his Norwegian heritage in starting a race named after a famous event in Norway.

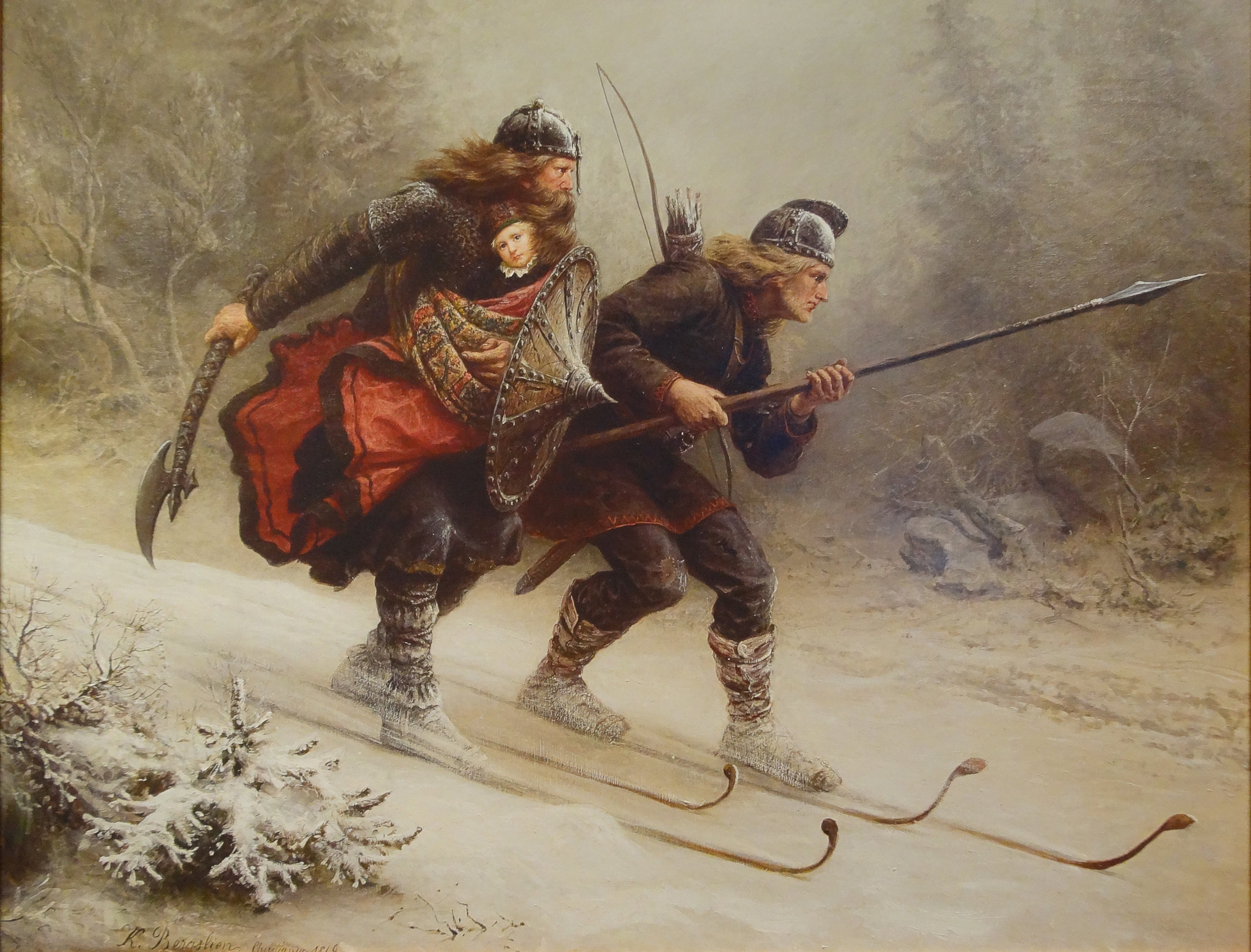
Knud Bergslien's historic painting in 1869 of the Birkebeiner skiers carrying Prince Haakon to safety during the winter of 1206.

The Birkie was named after the Birkebeinerrennet race in Norway, which commemorates an important historical event. In 1206 a group of Birkebeiner party soldiers, who fought for Sverre Sigurdsson and his descendants in the Norwegian civil war, smuggled the illegitimate son of Norway's King Håkon Sverresson from Lillehammer to safety in Trondheim. In the Norwegian Birkie, classic ski participants still carry 3.5-kilogram (7.7 lb) packs symbolizing the weight of the young child-prince, Haakon.

== Race description ==
Skiers from around the world come to Wisconsin for the race. The Birkie has a reputation for attracting skiers of varying ability levels. Olympians, national team members, and foreign professionals have competed in the event, and the Birkie also draws recreational skiers from Wisconsin, Minnesota, and the Upper Peninsula of Michigan and countries such as neighboring Canada as well as Norway, Sweden, and other European nations. Typically almost every U.S. state is represented at the Birkie. The race weekend also includes the shorter 29 km (18 mi) Kortelopet "Korte" and Prince Haakon 15 km (9.3 mi) events. The American Birkiebeiner Ski Foundation In 2013, registration was capped at 10,000 skiers, with an additional 20,000 spectators on the sidelines cheering on the competitors.

The Birkie course is quite hilly and is recognized as one of the more difficult cross country ski marathon courses in the world, despite the fact that there are several Worldloppet events in Europe that are much longer. The current north–south alignment (used since 1992) has skiers traversing a 2 km (1.2 mi) flat section before turning onto the "Powerline Hills", a series of climbs to the 4.5 km (2.8 mi) mark. The trail then rolls until 12 km (7.5 mi), when Firetower Hill takes competitors to 1,730 ft (530 m), the high point of the race and a climb of nearly 400 ft (120 m) from the race start. In the early years of the race, the Birkie began with a climb up the alpine slopes of Mount Telemark, mainly as a publicity stunt, but larger field sizes made this impractical. Beyond High Point is a series of downhills, including "Bobblehead Hill" or "Sledder Hill", which has a rather tricky downhill, left turn near a snowmobile trail — allowing dozens of snowmobilers to watch and "score" skiers' falls. The trail rises steeply to the crossing of County Road OO (Referred to as "Double-Oh") which, at 22.8 km (14.2 mi), is the unofficial halfway point of the race. Until 2001, the 23 km (14 mi) Kortelopet race ended here but was rerouted back to Telemark after splitting off from the main course at 9 km (5.6 mi). Since 2017, the Kortelopet is 29 km (18 mi) and begins at OO and finishes on Main Street the day before the 50 km race.

Beyond OO the course is less hilly, but by no means flat. After 40 km (25 mi) is "Bitch Hill," where spectators cheer skiers up the steepest climb of the race. Several kilometers later (just south of Highway 77), the last lengthy ascents of the race---Sunset Hill & Duffy Hill---challenge tired skiers. From the top, Hayward's water tower is a most welcome sight. There are several road crossings and open fields before the skiers cross frozen Lake Hayward. The 4 km (2.5 mi) crossing of the lake is flat, but unprotected from wind. Once off the lake, the trail twists through the outskirts of Hayward on snow trucked in for the event. Over the course of hours, thousands of tired skiers make their way past three blocks of cheering spectators lining Hayward's Main Street. Warm conditions have occasionally required the finish line to be moved to a flat field just east of the lake.

The race begins with several waves in order to thin skiers out along the course. Alternating skate and classical waves depart every five minutes. New skiers must ski in the last wave unless they use another ski marathon time to qualify for a higher wave. One man—Ernie St. Germaine, a former employee of the Telemark Resort, where the Birkebeiner starts every year—completed every Birkie since the first one in 1973.

The 2021 Birkie was a shortened 43-kilometer race that took place over the course of February 24–28, 2021. The course was modified as well with skiers starting and finishing at the starting line in Cable, WI. The Birkie reverted to its normal Cable to Hayward format for 2022 with the new addition of an "open track" event where participants could ski the race in a more relaxed manner on the Wednesday before the main race with fewer crowds and more open trail.

Despite low snow in 2024, the American Birkiebeiner Ski Foundation created a 10 km (6.2 mi) lapped course. Several races were shortened: The American Birkebeiner was shortened from 50 km (31 mi) to 30 km (18.6 mi), the Kortelopet from 29 km (18 mi) to 20 km (12.4 mi), the Prince Haakon from 15 km (9.3 mi) to 10 km (6.2 mi). The American Birkebeiner Men’s and Women’s Elite Skate race remained a 50K event.

== List of winners ==
Results are from the American Birkebeiner Ski Foundation.

=== 1973–2007 ===
Year	Men	Women
1973	Eric Ersson, Sweden	Jacque Lindskoog, USA
1974	Dave Quinn, USA	Jacque Lindskoog (2), USA
1975	Chris Haines, USA	Vigdis Snekkevi, USA
1976	Audun Kolstad, Norway	Jana Hlavaty, USA
1977	Audun Kolstad (2), Norway	Berit Lammedal, Norway
1978	Alfred Kaelin, Switzerland	Valborg Ostberg, Norway
1979	Arnt Haarstad, Norway	Judy Rabinowitz, USA
1980	Per Notten, Norway	Gry Oftedal, Norway
1981	Jean-Paul Pierrat, France	Marianne Hadler, USA
1982	Ola Hassis, Sweden	Gry Oftedal (2), Norway
1983	Rudi Kapeller, Austria	Jennifer Caldwell, USA
1984	Bengt Hassis, Sweden	Vigdis Rønning, Norway
1985	Oddvar Brå, Norway	Muffy Ritz, USA
1986	Anders Blomquist, Sweden	Muffy Ritz (2), USA
1987	Konrad Hallenbarter, Switzerland	E.J. Holcomb, USA
1988	Örjan Blomquist, Sweden	Kelly Kimball, USA
1989	Örjan Blomquist (2), Sweden	Betsy Youngman, USA
1990	Manfred Nagl, Austria	Lynne Cecil, USA
1991	Manfred Nagl (2), Austria	Ingrid Butts, USA
1992	Todd Boonstra, USA	Nina Skeime, Norway
1993	Manfred Nagl (3), Austria	Suzanne King, USA
1994	Tomas Caslavsky, Czech Republic	Heike Wezel, Germany
1995	Andre Jungen, Switzerland	Maria Theurl, Austria
1996	Silvano Barco, Italy	Gudrun Pflueger, Austria
1997	Mikhail Botwinov, Austria	Gudrun Pflueger (2), Austria
1998	Carl Swenson, USA	Jennifer Douglas, USA
1999	Johann Mühlegg, Germany	Laura McCabe, USA
2000	Race cancelled due to weather conditions	
2001	Gianantonio Zanetel, Italy	Nadezhda Slessareva, Russian Federation
2002	Maurizio Pozzi, Italy	Jeannie Wall, USA
2003	Gianantonio Zanetel (2), Italy	Lara Peyrot, Italy
2004	Gianantonio Zanetel (3), Italy	Lara Peyrot (2), Italy
2005	Marco Cattaneo, Italy	Lara Peyrot (3), Italy
2006	Marco Cattaneo (2), Italy	Anna Santer, Italy
2007	Zack Simons, USA	Kate Whitcomb, USA

=== 2008–present ===
Year	Men skate	Men classic	Women skate	Women classic
2008	Ivan Babikov, Canada	Yuri Kozlov, Russian Federation	Evelyn Dong, USA	Kelly Skillicorn, USA
2009	Matthew Liebsch, USA	Gus Kaeding, USA	Rebecca Dussault, USA	Martina Stursova, Czech Republic
2010	Fabio Santus, Italy	Juergen Uhl, USA	Rebecca Dussault (2), USA	Audrey Weber, USA
2011	Tore Gunderson, Norway	Juergen Uhl (2), USA	Caitlin Compton, USA	Jennie Bender, USA
2012	Tad Elliot, USA	David Chamberlain, USA	Holly Brooks, USA	Carolyn Ocariz, USA
2013	Sergio Bonaldi, Italy	Doug Debold, USA	Caitlin Gregg (2), USA	Ingrid Saupstad, Norway
2014	Tom Reichelt, Germany	Santiago Ocariz, USA	Caitlin Gregg (3), USA	Natalja Naryshkina, Russian Federation
2015	Sergio Bonaldi (2), Italy	Ole Christian Mork, Norway	Holly Brooks (2), USA	Natalja Naryshkina (2), Russian Federation
2016	David Norris, USA	Welly Ramsey, USA	Caitlin Gregg (4), USA	Deedra Irwin, USA
2017	Race cancelled due to weather conditions			
2018	Anders Gløersen, Norway	Ben Saxton, USA	Caitlin Gregg (5), USA	Felicia Gesior, USA
2019	Akeo Maifeld-Carucci, USA	Peter Holmes, USA	Alayna Sonnesyn, USA	Cate Brams, USA
2020	Niklas Dyrhaug, Norway	Peter Holmes (2), USA	Jessica Yeaton, Australia	Nichole Bathe, Great Britain
2021	Johnny Hagenbush, USA	Ian Torchia, USA	Alayna Sonnesyn (2), USA	Rosie Frankowski, USA
2022	Gerard Agnellet, France	Leo Hipp, USA	Alayna Sonnesyn (3), USA	Delaney FitzPatrick, USA
2023	David Norris, USA	Scott Hill, Canada	Alayna Sonnesyn (4), USA	Julie Ensrud, NOR
2024	Gus Schumacher, USA	Reid Goble, USA	Jessie Diggins, USA	Hannah Rudd, USA
2025	Gerard Agnellet, France	Fabian Stocek, Czech Republic	Sydney Palmer-Leger, USA	Lily Hubanks, USA
