= Rich (given name) =

Rich is a masculine given name, often short for Richard. People with the name include:

- Rich Baska (born 1952), American football player
- Rich Brightman (born 1990), American singer-songwriter
- Rich Campbell (American football) (born 1958), American former National Football League quarterback
- Rich Coady (center) (born 1944), American National Football League center
- Rich Coady (defensive back) (born 1976), American National Football League defensive back, son of the above
- Rich Cronin (1974–2010), American singer-songwriter, member of the band LFO
- Rich Eisen (born 1969), American television journalist
- Rich Franklin (born 1974), American retired mixed martial artist
- Rich Gannon (born 1965), American football player
- Rich Hall (born 1954), American comedian
- Rich Hill (baseball coach) (born 1962), American head baseball coach at the University of San Diego
- Rich Hill (pitcher) (born 1980), American Major League Baseball pitcher
- Rich Hogan (1913–1981), American screenwriter
- Rich Johnson (basketball) (1946–1994), American basketball player
- Rich Johnson (publishing executive), publishing executive in the field of graphic novels
- Rich Jones (basketball) (born 1946), retired American Basketball Association and National Basketball Association player
- Rich Jones (musician) (born 1973), English guitarist
- Rich King (basketball) (born 1969), American National Basketball Association player
- Rich King (sportscaster) (born 1947), American television sportscaster
- Rich Kreitling (1936–2020), American retired National Football League player
- Rich Lowry (born 1968), American magazine editor, syndicated columnist, author and political commentator
- Rich Milot (1957–2021), American retired National Football League player
- Rich Moore (born 1963), American animation director
- Rich Moore (American football) (born 1947), American football player
- Rich Mullins (1955–1997), American contemporary Christian music singer and songwriter
- Rich Ricci (born 1964), American-British banker and racehorse owner
- Rich Robertson (left-handed pitcher) (born 1968), American former Major League Baseball pitcher
- Rich Robertson (right-handed pitcher) (born 1944), American former Major League Baseball pitcher
- Rich Rodriguez (born 1963), American football coach and former player
- Rich Sommer (born 1978), American actor
- Rich Swann (born 1991), American professional wrestler
- Rich Thomaselli (born 1957), American football player
- Rich Thompson (disambiguation)
- Rich Vos (born 1957), American stand-up comedian, writer and actor
- Rich Wilson (journalist), UK-based freelance rock music writer

== Fictional characters ==
- Rich, a character in the American sitcom television series The Hogan Family
- Rich Halke, a character in the American television sitcom Step by Step
- Richie Rich, a fictional character in the Harvey Comics universe and self titled TV series
- Rich Schweikert, a character from Better Call Saul
