= HYR =

HYR may refer to:

- Haydons Road railway station, in London, England
- Sawyer County Airport, in Wisconsin, United States
