= Dick Thompson =

Dick Thompson is the name of:

- Dick Thompson (racing driver) (1920–2014), American racing driver
- Dick Thompson (athlete), British Paralympic athlete
- Dick Thompson or Richard Thompson (animator) (1914–1998), American animator

== See also ==
- Richard Thompson (disambiguation)
- Richard Thomson (disambiguation)
