= Hayward, Wisconsin =

- City
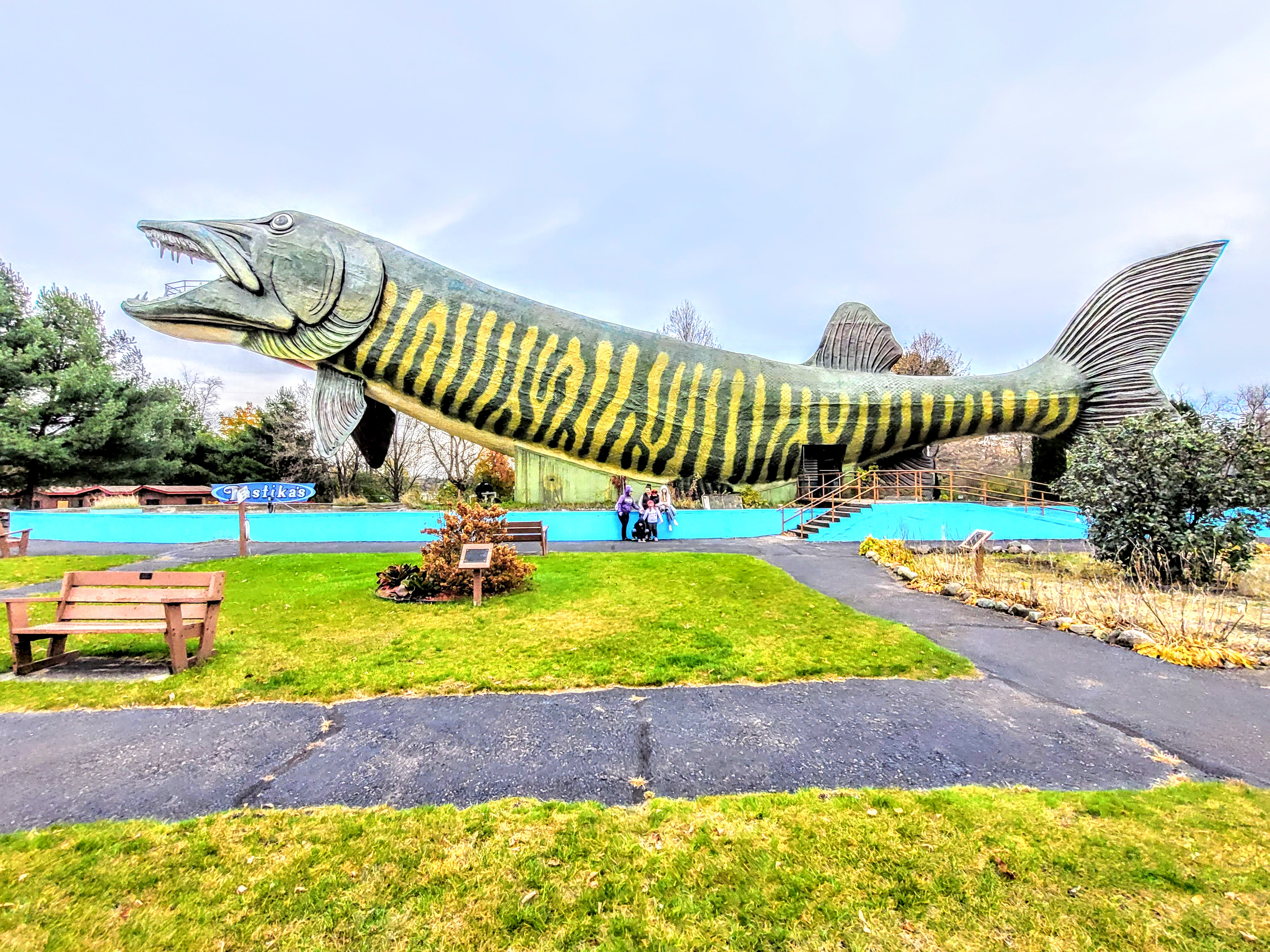
- National Fresh Water Fishing Hall of Fame

- Flag

- Location of Hayward in Sawyer County, Wisconsin

- Location within Wisconsin Location within the United States
- Coordinates: 46°0′36″N 91°28′50″W
- Country: United States
- State: Wisconsin
- County: Sawyer
- Formally Organized: 1883

Government
  - Mayor: Gary Gillis

Area
  - Total: 3.40 sq mi (8.81 km^{2})
  - Land: 3.17 sq mi (8.20 km^{2})
  - Water: 0.24 sq mi (0.61 km^{2})

Population (2020)
  - Total: 2,533
  - Density: 800/sq mi (308.8/km^{2})
- Time zone: UTC-6 (Central (CST))
  - Summer (DST): UTC-5 (CDT)
- ZIP code: 54843
- Area codes: 715 and 534
- FIPS code: 55-33450
- GNIS feature ID: 1583370
- Website: www.cityofhaywardwi.gov

Hayward is a city in Sawyer County, Wisconsin, United States, and its county seat. Its population was 2,533 at the 2020 census. The city was formally organized in 1883. It is near the Namekagon River and is surrounded by the Town of Hayward.

== History ==
=== Early history ===
Before logging, the area that would become Hayward was a forest of pine and hardwoods cut by rivers and lakes. In later years Ojibwe people dominated the area along with much of northern Wisconsin. They were part of what is known as the Anishinaabe group, which consists of Ojibwe, Potawatomi, and Ottawa tribes. They traveled on an over 500 year journey to this region from what is now known as Newfoundland. The Anishinaabe people held intense spiritual connections with the land they lived on known as "place making". The land was significant as it guided their identities and traditions. Their journey here was guided by a series of prophecies that explained the "chosen ground" would be one in which food grows on water. When they arrived they lived off the resources provided by the lakes in these areas through fishing, hunting, and gathering wild rice known as Manoomin or the "Food the Grows on Water". In 1745, a group of Ojibwe people, known as Lac Courte Oreilles Band of Lake Superior Chippewa, settled near Hayward, WI, until the 1837 Treaty of St. Peters, when they ceded it to the U.S. Along with the Homestead Act of 1862.

Logging along the Namekagon River had begun by 1864, when government surveyors noted that T. Mackey had a logging camp on the river at what would become Hayward. In the winter of 1878 Anthony Judson Hayward walked up on the ice, assessed mill sites and timber possibilities upstream, and decided to build a lumber mill. Until 1880 the spot was connected to the outside world only by river or logging tote roads, but in that year the Chicago, St. Paul, Minneapolis and Omaha Railway built its tracks through, connecting it to the Twin Cities and Chicago, and making Anthony Hayward's sawmill plan much more lucrative. He found financial backing and a partner in Robert Laird McCormick and managed to buy the last parcels of land for his sawmill in 1881. Their North Wisconsin Lumber Company dammed the river at the site of the current Hayward dam and built a sawmill, shingle mill, and planing mill to the north, called by 1883 "the Big Mill." The damming had significant effects on the Ojibwe families living here. 5,600 acres of reservation land were flooded. Much of this land consisted of rice beds, cemeteries, and villages, disrupting the homes, traditional food gathering practices, and resting places of many. "“There were bodies floating out of the Flowage for years afterward,” said Patty Loew, a retired journalism professor who has written several books on the history of tribes and is a citizen of the Mashkiiziibii, also known as the Bad River Band of Lake Superior Chippewa Indians."

That same year the village of Hayward was platted and Sawyer County was established, formed from parts of early versions of Chippewa and Ashland Counties. The village of Hayward was designated its county seat.

The mill town and county seat grew. By 1897 "2,000 souls" lived in the village, with 120 men working in the mill. Around that time the mill produced each year about 40 million feet of lumber, 10 million lath, and 4 million shingles, and the whole mill with drying yards covered forty acres. The village had a school, four churches, a bank, a free library, a fire company, and "nearly every Secret Society known to man." The village had electricity and a water works. Four blocks of the village streets were paved with brick.

In the surrounding country, settlers were beginning to wrest little farms out of the stump-lands cut off by the loggers. In 1896 it was reported that 432 bushels of corn were produced in Sawyer County, 610 bushels of barley, 14,516 bushels of oats, 380 bushels of rye, 1,125 tons of hay, 12,417 tons of potatoes, 3,065 bushels of non-potato root crops, and 6,500 pounds of butter. The same summary noted that dairy farming was rapidly increasing in the area.

Steady logging eventually depleted most of the pine, and then many of the hardwoods. The Big Mill at Hayward burned in 1922 and was not rebuilt. Logging on a smaller scale has continued ever since, along with agriculture. Meanwhile, tourism has become more and more important, and traditional food gathering practices were also hindered during the "spearfishing wars", where the federal court allowed Ojibwe people to maintain the right to fish off the reservation at night during spawning season. This resulted in a negative response from the surrounding community who feared a decrease in fish population and therefore a decrease in tourism. A radio station called WOJB used its platform to highlight perspectives from both sides of the conflict and promoting unity through music.

=== Hayward Indian Residential School ===
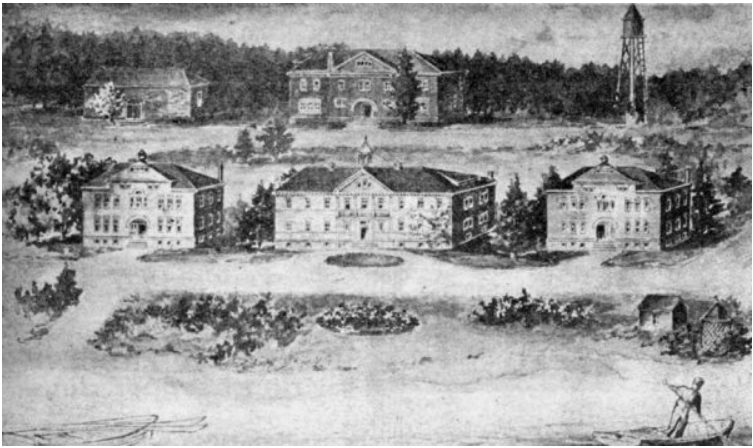
A drawing of the Hayward Indian Boarding School, which was published in 1900 by an unknown author

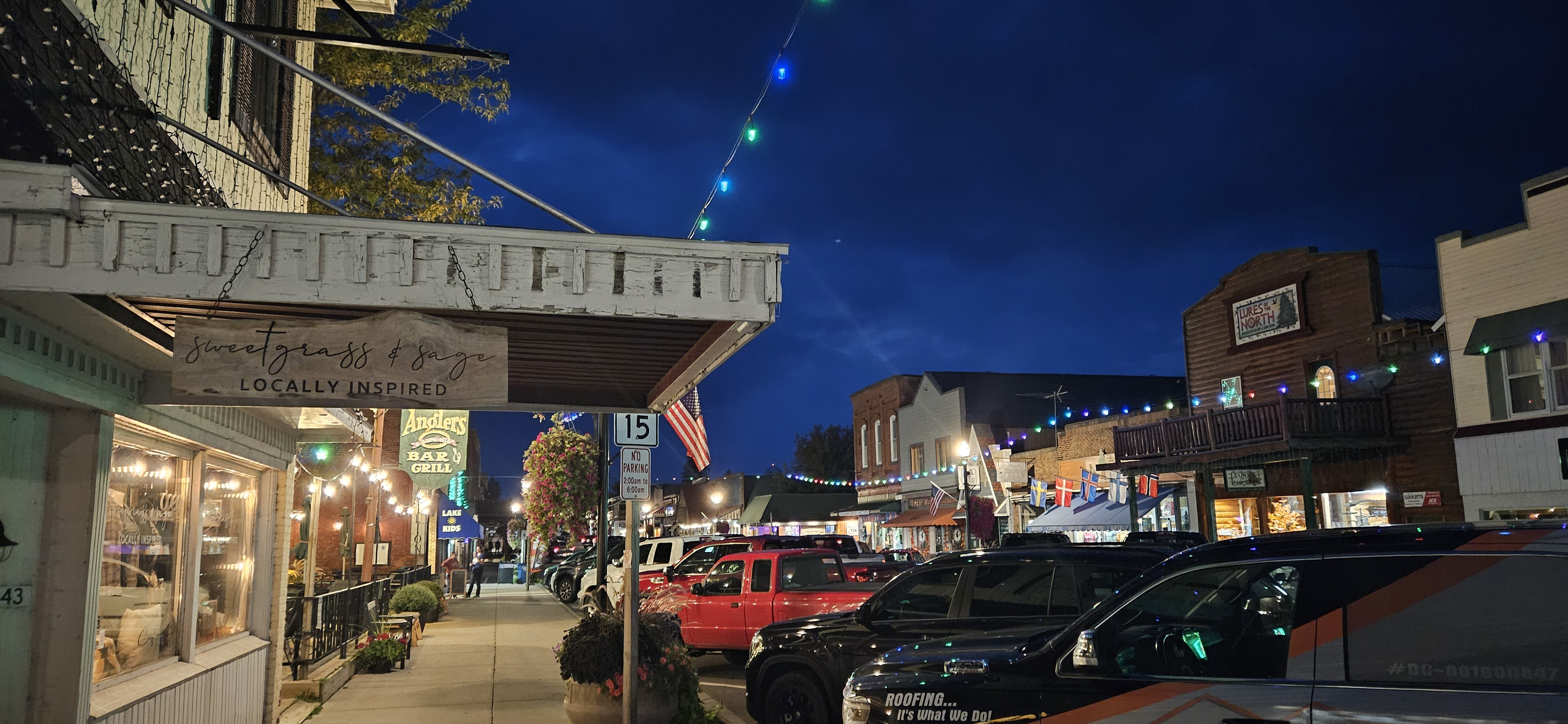
Downtown Hayward at night.

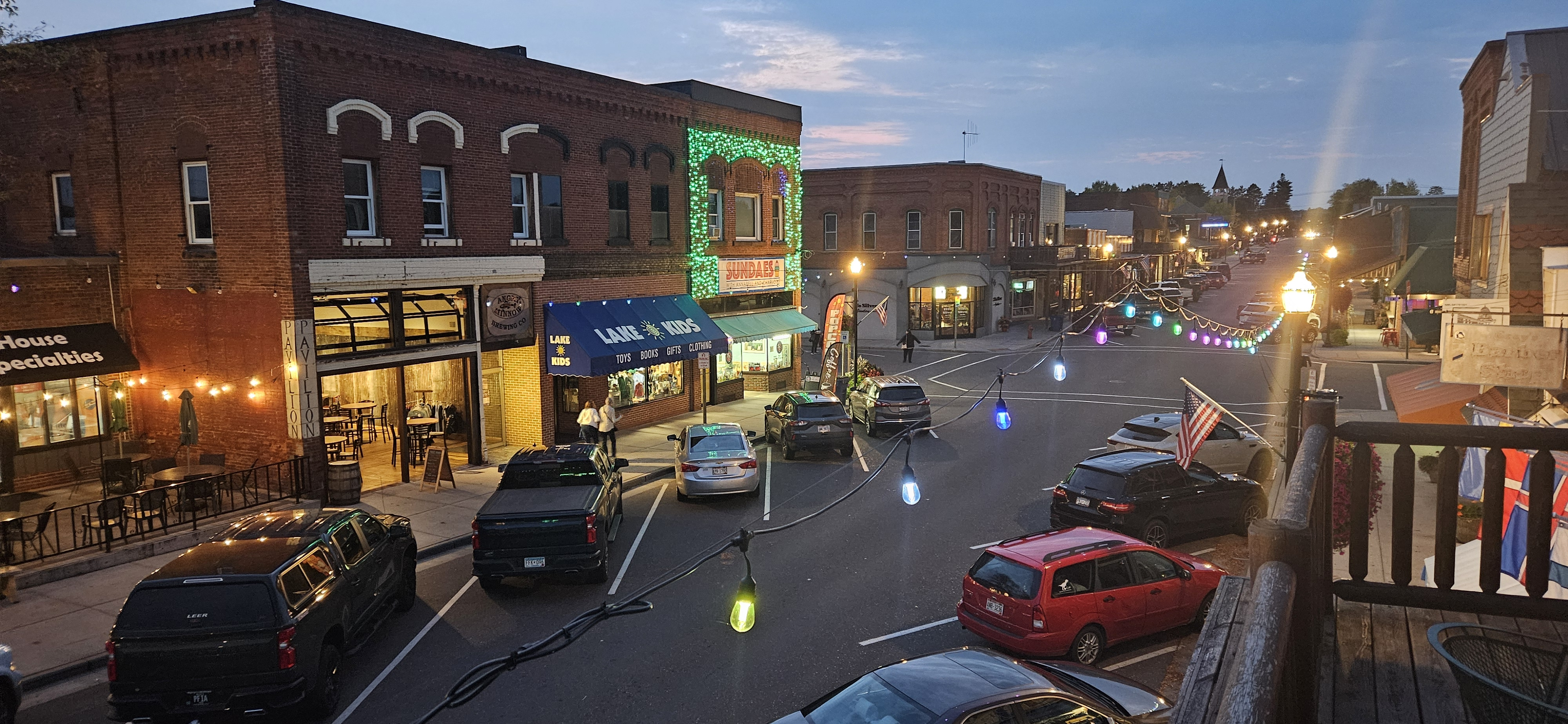
Downtown Hayward, looking north down Main Street.

In 1901, the Hayward Indian Residential School was established in Hayward. It was founded to assimilate indigenous children into white Christian American culture. Most of the students were Ojibwe and came from the Lac Courte Oreilles Reservation ten miles away from the school. The school operated until 1934, when it closed due to being understaffed, underfunded, and overcrowded. During its operation, thousands of students passed through the school. Some were taken forcibly from their families. At the school, children were forced to take on Christian names, cut their hair, wear military style uniforms, and march in military formations. Boys and girls were strictly segregated in separate buildings.

The curriculum focused on English language, Christian religion, and industrial labor. Provision of teachers was so poor that few students graduated, and graduation certificates were withheld from students who were thought likely to return to their reservations instead of assimilating into white society. The school was funded in part by the government and in part by the labor of the children in agriculture and sewing. Male children cleared over 260 acres for cultivation. Girls were trained as housewives and lived in the "Homestead Cottage", where a female teacher taught them how to run a household. The girls sold their sewing products to support the school and prepared meals for the other students. In the first decade of the school's operation, girls were encouraged to practice Native beadwork styles, but by 1910, this had been discontinued.

Overcrowding and poor sanitation endangered the students' health. Dishes were rarely cleaned, students slept two to a bed, and during the winter, they crowded into small rooms for indoor activities because the school had no gymnasium. Children were served moldy bread, and most of the milk the children produced from the dairy herd was sold rather than fed to the children. These poor health conditions led to high rates of disease. The death rate during the 1918 flu pandemic was 10 times higher than the Wisconsin average. Students also died from epidemics of measles and pneumonia. Some students were sexually abused by the teachers.

For speaking their Native languages, students were punished with beatings, public humiliation, extra chores, and confinement in the school jail. The school jail was a cell with bars in the basement of the boy's dormitory, where children were fed only bread and water. Other students were punished by being forced to kneel on marbles for hours. Hayward students sometimes went out into the woods on the weekends and spoke Ojibwe together since it was forbidden in school. On one occasion, a secret drum dance was held, where students prepared by secretly sewing jingles onto their dresses and practicing their singing at night. The superintendents caught the students and punished them by burning their drums, hitting their knuckles, and forcing the girls to wear signs around their necks reading, "I will not squaw dance". Due to the poor conditions and harsh discipline, runaways were common; in 1920 alone, 69 children ran away from the school. In 2024, the Department of the Interior released a report that stated three students who died during their time at the school had been identified.

The school closed in 1934 and was converted to the Hayward Area Memorial Hospital.

== Geography ==
Hayward is located at 46°0′36″N 91°28′50″W (46.01, -91.480556).

According to the United States Census Bureau, the city has an area of 3.36 square miles (8.70 km^{2}), of which 0.23 sq mi (0.60 km^{2}) is covered by water.

Hayward is 71 miles southeast of Superior, 27 miles northeast of Spooner, about 107 miles north of Eau Claire, and 57 miles southwest of Ashland.

=== Climate ===
Climate data for Hayward, Wisconsin (1991–2020 normals, extremes 1893–present)
Month	Jan	Feb	Mar	Apr	May	Jun	Jul	Aug	Sep	Oct	Nov	Dec	Year
Record high °F (°C)	56 (13)	60 (16)	81 (27)	89 (32)	98 (37)	106 (41)	108 (42)	100 (38)	96 (36)	86 (30)	75 (24)	59 (15)	108 (42)
Mean maximum °F (°C)	42.5 (5.8)	47.3 (8.5)	63.1 (17.3)	77.3 (25.2)	85.9 (29.9)	89.9 (32.2)	91.8 (33.2)	90.2 (32.3)	86.5 (30.3)	76.1 (24.5)	62.6 (17.0)	45.8 (7.7)	93.5 (34.2)
Mean daily maximum °F (°C)	24.0 (−4.4)	29.8 (−1.2)	42.4 (5.8)	55.8 (13.2)	69.3 (20.7)	77.9 (25.5)	81.8 (27.7)	79.3 (26.3)	71.6 (22.0)	57.3 (14.1)	41.4 (5.2)	28.7 (−1.8)	54.9 (12.7)
Daily mean °F (°C)	13.5 (−10.3)	17.8 (−7.9)	30.0 (−1.1)	43.0 (6.1)	55.6 (13.1)	64.7 (18.2)	68.7 (20.4)	66.5 (19.2)	59.4 (15.2)	46.3 (7.9)	32.4 (0.2)	19.7 (−6.8)	43.1 (6.2)
Mean daily minimum °F (°C)	2.9 (−16.2)	5.8 (−14.6)	17.6 (−8.0)	30.1 (−1.1)	41.9 (5.5)	51.6 (10.9)	55.5 (13.1)	53.7 (12.1)	47.1 (8.4)	35.2 (1.8)	23.4 (−4.8)	10.7 (−11.8)	31.3 (−0.4)
Mean minimum °F (°C)	−25.5 (−31.9)	−21.9 (−29.9)	−11.2 (−24.0)	12.1 (−11.1)	24.2 (−4.3)	34.1 (1.2)	42.1 (5.6)	39.2 (4.0)	27.9 (−2.3)	18.0 (−7.8)	1.8 (−16.8)	−17.7 (−27.6)	−28.7 (−33.7)
Record low °F (°C)	−45 (−43)	−52 (−47)	−40 (−40)	−6 (−21)	11 (−12)	24 (−4)	32 (0)	29 (−2)	15 (−9)	1 (−17)	−21 (−29)	−42 (−41)	−52 (−47)
Average precipitation inches (mm)	0.89 (23)	0.89 (23)	1.46 (37)	2.70 (69)	3.99 (101)	4.20 (107)	4.15 (105)	3.94 (100)	3.97 (101)	3.15 (80)	1.67 (42)	1.26 (32)	32.27 (820)
Average snowfall inches (cm)	12.0 (30)	10.4 (26)	10.3 (26)	5.5 (14)	0.6 (1.5)	0.0 (0.0)	0.0 (0.0)	0.0 (0.0)	0.0 (0.0)	0.8 (2.0)	7.3 (19)	12.5 (32)	59.4 (151)
Average precipitation days (≥ 0.01 in)	8.8	6.9	7.9	11.2	12.5	13.3	11.6	10.8	11.8	12.4	9.5	10.1	126.8
Average snowy days (≥ 0.1 in)	8.6	6.3	4.7	2.6	0.2	0.0	0.0	0.0	0.0	0.8	4.9	8.5	36.6
Source: NOAA

== Demographics ==
Historical population
Census	Pop.	Note	%±
1890	1,349		—
1920	1,302		—
1930	1,207		−7.3%
1940	1,571		30.2%
1950	1,577		0.4%
1960	1,540		−2.3%
1970	1,457		−5.4%
1980	1,698		16.5%
1990	1,897		11.7%
2000	2,129		12.2%
2010	2,318		8.9%
2020	2,533		9.3%
U.S. Decennial Census

=== 2010 census ===
As of the census of 2010, 2,318 people, 1,048 households, and 550 families resided in the city. The population density was 740.6 inhabitants per square mile (285.9/km^{2}). The 1,227 housing units had an average density of 392.0 per square mile (151.4/km^{2}). The racial makeup of the city was 83.3% White, 0.4% African American, 11.8% Native American, 0.9% Asian, 0.3% from other races, and 3.2% from two or more races. Hispanics or Latinos of any race were 2.5% of the population.

Of the 1,048 households, 27.6% had children under 18 living with them, 32.5% were married couples living together, 14.0% had a female householder with no husband present, 5.9% had a male householder with no wife present, and 47.5% were not families. About 41.7% of all households were made up of individuals, and 20.0% had someone living alone who was 65 or older. The average household size was 2.10 and the average family size was 2.80.

The median age in the city was 39.8 years. 23.7% of residents were under the age of 18; 8.5% were between the ages of 18 and 24; 23.6% were from 25 to 44; 23.5% were from 45 to 64; and 20.8% were 65 years of age or older. The gender makeup of the city was 47.5% male and 52.5% female.

=== 2000 census ===
As of the census of 2000, 2,129 people, 960 households, and 530 families were residing in the city. The population density was 717.2/sq mi (276.8/km^{2}). The1,064 housing units had an average density of 358.4/sq mi (138.3/km^{2}). The racial makeup of the city was 89.62% White, 0.14% African American, 8.08% Native American, 0.66% Asian, 0.56% from other races, and 0.94% from two or more races. About 0.85% of the population were Hispanics or Latinos of any race.

Of the 960 households, 26.8% had children under 18 living with them, 38.2% were married couples living together, 13.9% had a female householder with no husband present, and 44.8% were not families. About 39.8% of all households were made up of individuals, and 19.1% had someone living alone who was 65 or older. The average household size was 2.09, and the average family size was 2.78.

In the city, the age distribution was 22.6% under 18, 8.7% from 18 to 24, 25.5% from 25 to 44, 20.9% from 45 to 64, and 22.4% who were 65 or older. The median age was 40 years. For every 100 females, there were 88.2 males. For every 100 females 18 and over, there were 81.9 males.

The median income for a household in the city was $28,421, and for a family was $36,287. Males had a median income of $30,174 versus $20,769 for females. The per capita income for the city was $16,658. About 10.6% of families and 14.5% of the population were below the poverty line, including 19.5% of those under age 18 and 7.1% of those age 65 or over.

== Arts and culture ==
The world's largest muskie at the National Fresh Water Fishing Hall of Fame is Hayward's most famous landmark.

Hayward is a popular fishing destination because of the many lakes in the area, including Lac Courte Oreilles, Grindstone Lake, Round Lake, Moose Lake, Spider Lake, Windigo Lake, and the Chippewa Flowage, which are known for yielding trophy-sized muskellunge, northern pike, walleye, and smallmouth bass. It is also home to the "Quiet Lakes" (Teal, Ghost and Lost Land Lakes), which do not allow water sports.

The National Fresh Water Fishing Hall of Fame is in Hayward. It contains a 143-foot (44 m) fiberglass muskie, the world's largest fiberglass structure. Tourists can climb up into the fish's mouth and look over the town, as well as Lake Hayward. In addition to fishing, Hayward is also a hot spot for deer hunting, golfing, cross-country skiing, snowmobiling, canoeing, kayaking, horseback riding, and road and mountain biking.

Sawyer County has over 600 miles of groomed snowmobile trails, including 335 miles that run through county forests and connect with trails in adjoining counties.

ATV (quad bikes) riding along county forest logging roads is permitted. About 95.7 miles of state-funded ATV trails are available for winter use and 80.8 miles are for summer use. State-owned trails include the Tuscobia Trail (51 miles), which runs from the Flambeau River to the western county line and the Dead Horse Connector (38 miles) in the eastern Flambeau Forest. The trail system also connects to 140 miles of trail within the Chequamegon National Forest. Hayward allows ATVs on some city roads.

The annual Chequamegon Fat Tire Festival is the nation's largest mass-start mountain-bike race. The first Fat Tire Festival was held in 1983 with 27 riders, and in 2008, the race was capped at 2,500 competitors. The two main races include the 40-mile "Chequamegon 40", and the 16-mile "Short and Fat".

Participants in the annual Lumberjack World Championships compete in a variety of lumberjack events, such as log rolling, chopping, sawing, and chainsaw competitions. Annually, athletes have been gathering for almost seven decades, traveling from roughly a dozen countries and 25 states to compete annually in mid to late July, in front of over 12,000 spectators on an original holding pond for logs, a remnant from Hayward's days as a lumber town.

Hayward hosts the American Birkebeiner cross-country skiing race, North America's largest cross-country ski marathon. The race started in 1973. No U.S. Ski Team members were in it, or any foreign skiers. Then unknown, it now has over 13,000 skiers race every year. It is one of Hayward's largest and most popular tourist attractions.

The Lac Courte Oreilles Band of Ojibwe host several pow-wows throughout the year. One of the Midwest's largest pow-wows is held annually on the third weekend of July near Hayward. The Honor the Earth Pow-wow honors Mother Earth and the Creator.

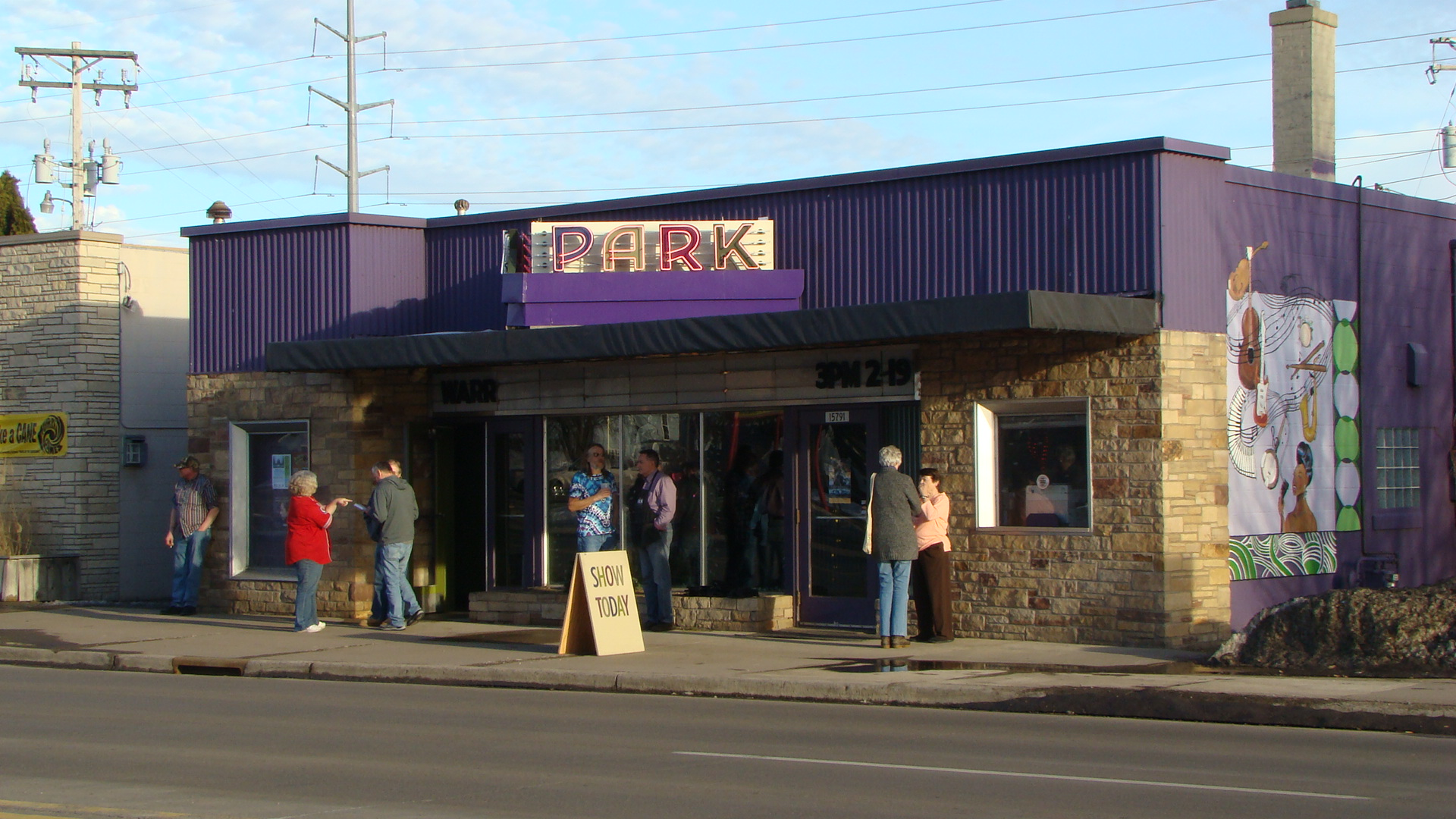
Park Theatre

The Park Theatre is a performing arts center in Hayward, on Highway 63, operated by the Cable Hayward Area Arts Council. A variety of musical and artistic performances are presented throughout the year.

Hayward Wolfpack FC, an amateur soccer club, is based in Hayward. Founded in 2017, it competed in the Duluth Amateur Soccer League in 2018. In 2019, the Wolfpack became a founding member of the Wisconsin Primary Amateur Soccer League, a United States Adult Soccer Association and WSL-sanctioned league operating in western Wisconsin.

== Government ==
Hayward is the county seat of Sawyer County. The mayor as of 2023 was Gary Gillis.

Presidential elections results

Presidential election results
Year	Republican	Democratic	Third parties
2024	58.2% 721	40.1% 497	1.7% 20
2020	57.3% 661	40.7% 469	2.0% 23
2016	54.5% 558	38.4% 393	7.1% 73
2012	46.8% 477	52.4% 534	0.9% 9
2008	41.9% 438	56.7% 592	1.4% 15
2004	52.3% 566	46.4% 502	1.3% 14
2000	50.4% 468	43.6% 405	5.9% 55

== Education ==
Hayward High School and Hayward Middle School serve the community. Lac Courte Oreilles Ojibwe University offers several degrees.

== Media ==
The Sawyer County Record is the local newspaper, published every Wednesday.

Radio stations include:

- WBZH 910, owned by Civic Media
- WHSM-FM 101.1, owned by Civic Media
- WRLS-FM 92.3, owned by Vacationland Broadcasting
- WOJB-FM 88.9, owned by the Lac Courte Oreilles Band of Ojibwe

Television stations received in Hayward from the Duluth area include:

- 3 KDLH (CW)
- 6 KBJR (NBC/CBS)
- 8 WDSE (PBS)
- 10 WDIO (ABC)
- 21 KQDS (FOX)

== Transportation ==
U.S. Highway 63, Wisconsin Highway 27, Wisconsin Highway 77 and County Highway B are the main routes in the community.

Hayward has a public bus service, Namekagon Transit, which has three separate lines. Route 30 starts at Walmart and runs through the town with stops at Sawyer County Courthouse and Marketplace Foods, and then runs to the transfer center at the Sevenwinds Casino, where one can transfer to or from Lines 40 or 60. Route 40 runs in a complete circuit route past Round Lake and to some other rural neighborhoods around the areas, and then arrives back at the transfer center. Route 60 runs south from the casino, making two stops, then diverging into two lines at the LCO Country Store. One heads on CTH-K, and eventually terminates in the North Woods Beach neighborhood; the other heads on CTH-E and terminates in the unincorporated community of Reserve. Namekagon Transit also has door-stop services in Sawyer, Barron, Washburn, and some parts of Bayfield counties.

Sawyer County Airport serves Hayward and the surrounding communities.

== Notable people ==
- Fritz Ackley (1937–2002), professional baseball player
- David W. Anderson, founder of the Famous Dave's barbecue chain, which he started in Hayward, and former U.S. Assistant Secretary of the Interior for Indian Affairs
- Harry Blackmun (1908–1999), U.S. Supreme Court justice who had a summer home on Spider Lake
- Al Capone (1899–1947), Chicago gangster who owned a hideaway-retreat near Hayward/Couderay in the 1920s and 1930s
- Sonny Dalesandro (born 1977), professional soccer player and restaurateur
- Nate DeLong (1926–2010), professional basketball player
- Jim Denomie (1955–2022), artist
- Sean Duffy (born 1971), 20th U.S. Secretary of Transportation and former congressman
- John H. Hellweg (1844–1931), Wisconsin state legislator and businessman
- Pete Maina (born 1963), professional muskie angler and television host
- William W. McCutcheon (1926–2020), Minnesota state senator and St. Paul police chief
- Carl R. Nyman (1895–1983), Wisconsin state legislator
- Dan Plante (born 1971), professional hockey player
- Daniel E. Riordan (1863–1942), Wisconsin state senator
- Randy Sabien (born 1956), musician/songwriter
- J. R. Salzman (born 1979), world-champion logroller
- Richard Earl Thompson (1914–1991), Impressionist painter who summered on Big Round Lake near Hayward

== Sister city ==
Hayward officially has one sister city:

Lillehammer, Norway

== See also ==
- List of cities in Wisconsin
