= Santner =

Santner is a surname. Notable people with the surname include:

- Eric Santner (born 1955), American academic
- Johann Santner (1840–1912), Austrian mountain climber
- Mitchell Santner (born 1992), New Zealand cricketer

== See also ==
- Santer
