= KHYR =

KHYR may refer to:

- Sawyer County Airport (ICAO code KHYR)
- KHYR-LP, a defunct low-power radio station (103.3 FM) formerly licensed to serve Falcon, Colorado, United States
