= Donald Weldon Brann =

Major General Donald Weldon Brann MBE
- Born: September 26, 1895; Rushville, Indiana, US
- Died: December 29, 1945 (aged 50); Austria or Italy
- Burial place: Arlington Cemetery
- Education: Command and General Staff School
- Spouse: Dorothy Elizabeth Teel
- Children: 1
- Military career
- Allegiance: United States
- Branch: Army
- Service years: 1917–1945
- Rank: Major general
- Service number: 0-14592
- Commands: Assistant chief of staff for operations for the U.S. Fifth Army, deputy chief of staff 15th Army Group (Italy), deputy commanding general, U.S. Forces in Austria
- Conflicts: World War 2; Operation Torch; Italian Campaign; Operation Avalanche; Battle of Anzio; Liberation of Rome; Volturno Line
- Awards: Legion of Merit - US Military; Distinguished Service Medal - Army (DSM); Complete list

Major General Donald Weldon Brann (September 26, 1895 – December 29, 1945) was a senior officer in the United States Army. He served as assistant chief of staff for operations of the Fifth Army during the Italian Campaign of World War 2, participating in the Battle of Anzio, Operation Avalanche, the Capture of the Volturno Line, and the Liberation of Rome, and as deputy commanding officer of the US Forces in Austria.

Brann was killed in Kitzbuehel, Austria or Italy on December 29, 1945, when he was hunting with Major General Withers A. Burres and two guides and fell off a cliff.

== Early life ==
Donald Weldon Brann was born to Oliver Cambry Brann, a supermarket owner and Dollie Brann (née Ballard) in Rushville, Indiana, on September 26, 1895. His only sibling was his brother, William Brann.

Brann attended Rushville High School, which he graduated from in 1913. Afterwards, he attended Purdue University and University of Michigan, before enlisting in the Army in 1917.

== Military career ==
Brann attended officer training camp at Fort Benjamin Harrison from May to August 1917, after which he received a commission as second lieutenant in the Army. He was assigned to the 46th Infantry Regiment of the 9th Division during WW1, but never went overseas.

=== Early military career ===
Brann resigned from the Army in 1919, when he moved to San Antonio, Texas, where he met his wife, Dorothy Elizabeth Teel. The couple married on January 10, 1923.

On June 19, 1921, Brann rejoined the Army when he received his commission as first lieutenant. Brann served in Tientsin, China, from 1923 to 1927, to protect US citizens during the Chinese Civil War. While there, Dorothy gave birth to the couple's only child, Dorothy Ballard Brann, later McCroy, in 1924.

Upon return, Brann served as an instructor at the military school at Fort Thomas, after which he graduated from the Command and General Staff School in 1935, and was promoted to captain. He then served as an instructor of military science and tactics at the University of Hawaii from 1935 to 1937. He served with the Army General Staff Corps, where he received promotions to major and lieutenant colonel. Afterwards, he served as chief of staff of the 95th Infantry Division from 1942 to 1943.

=== Italian Campaign ===
On June 3, 1943, he was sent overseas to North Africa, where he served as assistant chief of staff for the Fifth Army under Lieutenant General Mark Clark, the youngest three-star general in the Army. In September, Brann was promoted to brigadier general. The primary goal of Fifth Army, which was made up of leftover forces from Operation Torch, was, aside from helping local authorities and training the French Forces in North Africa, to prepare and train for the amphibious invasion of Italy.

US troops and ships at Salerno landings, part of Operation Avalanche

On September 9, Fifth Army landed on a beach south of Salerno, Italy, becoming the first American force to land in mainland Europe of the war. At the time, Fifth Army included the British X Corps and 3 US divisions. This became known as the "Baptism by Fire". This later became the Fifth Army's Unit Day. 788 people died in the landings.

The day before the invasion, the Italians withdrew from the war, beginning the German Occupation of Italy. After the landings, the Fifth Army began to move north towards Rome, but as the terrain grew more mountainous, the fighting grew more difficult. On the night of October 12, 1943, the Fifth Army attacked the Volturno Line, the southernmost main German defensive line. However, they were sent back by the Germans, delaying the successful breakthrough until December.

On May 8, 1944, Brann received a Distinguished Service Medal for "exceptionally meritorious distinguished service" for supervizing the allied landings on Italy.

In December, after the Liberation of Rome, Clark assumed command of the Fifteenth Army Group, making Brann deputy chief of staff Fifteenth Army Group (Italy). In December 1945, Brann was made a major general. In December, he was made deputy commanding officer of the US Forces in Austria,

== Death ==
On December 29, 1945, when Brann was on a hunting trip in rugged mountains above Kitzbuehul, Austria, with Withers A. Buress and two guides, Brann fell over 100 meters off of a cliff. His funeral was held in Vienna on December 31, 1945. His body was then sent to the United States, where he was buried in Arlington Cemetery, Section 11, Lot 836. However, some sources state that he died in Italy.

== Awards ==
- Order of the Crown of Italy
- Order of the British Empire
- Order of Military Merit (Brazil)
- French Legion of Honor
- Army of Occupation Medal (Posthumous)
- Legion of Merit
- Distinguished Service Medal
