= Park Theatre =

Park Theatre or Park Theater may refer to:

Historic theatres

- Park Theatre (Boston), Massachusetts (1879–1990)
- Park Theatre (Brooklyn), New York (1860–1908)
- Park Theatre (Manhattan) (the "Old Drury"), New York (1798–1848)
- Park Theatre, New York City (1911–1923, 1935–1944), built in 1903 as Majestic Theatre (Columbus Circle)
- Park Theatre (Philadelphia, Broad St.)

Current theatres

- Park Theatre (Estes Park, Colorado) (built 1913)
- Park Theatre (Hayward, Wisconsin) (built 1948)
- Park Theatre (London) (opened 2013)
- Park Theater, Union City, New Jersey, now Park Performing Arts Center (built 1931)
- Park Theatre (Vancouver), British Columbia (built 1940)

== See also ==
Historic theatres

- Abbey's Park Theatre, built as New Park Theatre, New York City (1873–1882)
- New Park Theatre (later Herald Square Theatre), New York City (1883–1914)

Current theatres

- Central Park Theatre, the name during 1931 of the New Century Theatre, Manhattan
- Devonshire Park Theatre, Eastbourne, East Sussex, UK
- Grosvenor Park Open Air Theatre, Chester, UK (founded 2010)
- Hyde Park Theatre, Austin, Texas
- Mungo Park (theatre), Allerød, Denmark
- North Park Theatre, Buffalo, New York
- Oak Park Festival Theatre, Illinois
- Dolby Live, Las Vegas
- Queens Theatre in the Park, Queens, New York City
- Regent's Park Open Air Theatre, London (founded 1932)
- Theatre in the Park, community theatre in Raleigh, North Carolina
