= Hayward Municipal Airport =

Hayward Municipal Airport may refer to:

- Hayward Executive Airport, formerly Hayward Municipal Airport, in Hayward, California, United States
- Sawyer County Airport, formerly Hayward Municipal Airport, in Hayward, Wisconsin, United States
