= Richard Thomson =

Richard Thomson may refer to:

- Richard Thomson (theologian) (died 1613), Dutch-born English theologian and translator
- Richard Thomson (antiquarian) (1794–1865), English librarian
- Richard Thomson (cricketer) (born 1938), English cricketer
- Richard M. Thomson (born 1933), Canadian banker
- Richard Thomson (politician), Scottish politician
- Richie Thomson (1940–2012), New Zealand Olympic cyclist
- Ricky Thomson (born 1957), Scottish footballer

== See also ==
- Thomson (surname)
- Richard Thompson (disambiguation)
