= Italian War (disambiguation) =

The term Italian War can be used to refer to any of a number of conflicts:

- The Social War (91–87 BC)
- The Gothic War (535–554)
- The Italian Wars of 1494–1559
- The Italian Wars of Independence of 1848–1866
- The Italian Civil War of 1943–1945

== See also ==
- Italian Campaign (disambiguation)
