= Pete Maina =

American author, entertainer, and angler

- Born: January 1, 1963 (age 63)
- Occupations: Author, TV show host
- Known for: Expertise in Muskellunge (muskie) fishing
- Website: www.petemaina.com

Pete Maina is an author, professional muskellunge (muskie) angler, professional photographer, TV show host, professional speaker and former magazine owner. Maina's specialty is muskie fishing, and has advocated for conservation of the muskie species. Maina resides in Hayward, Wisconsin.

== Early career ==
Pete Maina worked at his parents' family company during the winter in Wisconsin while during the summer he worked as a muskie guide. He is also a writer/photographer and a member of Outdoor Writers Association of America.

== TV shows ==
Maina is one of the hosts of The Next Bite TV on NBC Sports Network. The show is now airing its 8th season. He has appeared as an expert on numerous TV shows, appearing regularly on John Gillespie’s Waters and Woods on Fox Sports Wisconsin, Fox Sports North, NBC Sports Chicago and WVTV in Milwaukee, as well as on muskie segments for Bass Pro Shops Outdoor World on OLN.

== Magazine ownership ==
He is a former co-owner and release editor for The Next Bite-Esox Angler Magazine, the international publication for muskie, northern pike and walleye.

== Books and DVDs ==
Maina has 2 books published on muskie fishing. The most popular being Muskies Suck. Maina also produces educational videos and DVDs on muskie fishing and has lectured at sport shows throughout North America.

== Photography ==
Maina is also a professional photographer. His photography has appeared on the covers of Game and Fish magazine and his own magazine, as well as inside several outdoor related publications.
