= Rich Thompson =

Rich Thompson is the name of:

- Rich Thompson (pitcher, born 1984), Major League Baseball relief pitcher
- Rich Thompson (outfielder) (born 1979), professional baseball outfielder
- Rich Thompson (pitcher, born 1958), former Major League Baseball relief pitcher

== See also ==
- Richard Thompson (disambiguation)
