= Tércio Pacitti =

Brazilian computer scientist

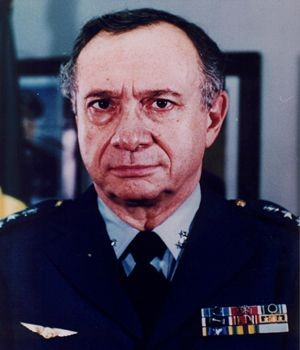
- Born: 9 September 1928; Atibaia, São Paulo, Brazil
- Died: 18 June 2014; Rio de Janeiro, Rio de Janeiro, Brazil
- Education: University of California, Berkeley
- Known for: Brazilian Computer Science Pioneer
- Awards: National Order of Scientific Merit, Order of Military Merit, Order of Naval Merit, Order of Merit for Defense
- Scientific career
- Fields: Computer science
- Workplaces: Federal University of Rio de Janeiro, Instituto Tecnológico de Aeronáutica
- Thesis: A Computer Oriented Economic Planning Model for a Country in Rapid Development
- Doctoral advisor: Otto J. M. Smith

Tércio Pacitti (September 9, 1928 in Atibaia – June 18, 2014 in Rio de Janeiro), São Paulo, Brazil was an electronic engineer and computer scientist in Brazil.

== Biography ==
Pacitti was born in Atibaia-SP, Brazil, son of Antônio Pacitti and Isabel de Moraes Pacitti. He graduated as aeronautical engineer from ITA, first in the class of 1952, having completed a Masters (1961) and Ph.D. (1971) at University of California, Berkeley. He was a student of David A. Huffman among others at Berkeley.

Pacitti wrote several books in computer science, especially the Fortran Monitor, which from 1967 to 1987 has sold 250,000 copies in the country, and Do Fortran à Internet (From Fortran to the Internet), retrospect of his life and information technology in the world, already in its third edition. He launched in 2006 Paradigmas do software aberto (Paradigms of open source software), his most recent work.

He led the introduction of information technology at the ITA, at the Air Force, at COPPE-UFRJ and at UNIRIO. He was rector of the ITA between 1982 and 1984, and established the course of Computer Engineering.

His last post in the Air Force Command, as Major-Brigadier Engineer, was the Head of the Directorate of Engineering in 1986 and 1987 season in which he also chaired the ADESG. He was president of the Council of Informatics of the State of Rio de Janeiro from 1987 to 1990. It currently belongs to the National Academy of Engineering and is scientific adviser to the presidency of Consist.

On April 24, 2019, the President of the Republic, Jair Messias Bolsonaro, signed Law No. 13,817, in which he granted the title of Patron of Information Technology of Aeronautics to Major-Brigadier Engineer Tércio Pacitti.

== Awards ==
- Excellence in Software Award granted by the International Centre for Software Technology (CTIS), 1996

=== Decorations ===
Tercio Pacitti was container, among others, the following medals:

- Commander of the Order of Military Merit (Ordem do Mérito Militar)
- Commander of the Order of Naval Merit (Ordem do Mérito Naval)
- Grand Officer of the Order of Merit for Defense (Ordem do Mérito da Defesa)
- Grand Cross of the National Order of Scientific Merit (Ordem Nacional do Mérito Científico) - President of the Republic of Brazil - Mar/1998.
- Peacemaker Medal (Medalha do Pacificador) (Port Min No 791 of 28 Sep 83 / No. 41 BE, 14 Oct 83)
- Medal of Merit Tamandaré (Medalha Mérito Tamandaré) - Air Force
- Grand Officer of the Order of Ipiranga (Ordem do Ipiranga)

== Books ==
- Atkinson, Cyril P.; Pacitti, Tércio (1983). Programação e Métodos Computacionais [Programming and Computational Methods] (in Portuguese). Vol. 1 (4 ed.). Rio de Janeiro: LTC. p. 431. ISBN 85-216-0283-9.
- Atkinson, Cyril P.; Pacitti, Tércio (1976). Programação e Métodos Computacionais [Programming and Computational Methods] (in Portuguese). Vol. 2 (2 ed.). Rio de Janeiro: LTC. p. 380. ISBN 85-216-0284-7.
- Pacitti, Tércio (1967). Fortran Monitor [Fortran Monitor] (in Portuguese). Rio de Janeiro: Ao Livro Técnico. p. 282.
- Pacitti, Tércio (1985). Programação - Princípios [Programming - Principles] (in Portuguese). Rio de Janeiro: Ao Livro Técnico. p. 361.
- Pacitti, Tércio (2003). Construindo o Futuro através da Educação (do Fortran à Internet) [Building the Future through Education (Fortran to the Internet)] (in Portuguese) (3 ed.). Rio de Janeiro: Thomsom. p. 472. ISBN 85-221-0331-3.
- Pacitti, Tércio (2006). Paradigmas do Software Aberto [Paradigms of Open Source] (in Portuguese). Rio de Janeiro: LTC. p. 156. ISBN 85-216-1467-5.
