= Hayward Middle School =

Coordinates: 46°00′39.1″N 91°30′9.1″W

Location
- 10408 N. Greenwood Lane; Hayward, Sawyer, WI, 54843; United States

Information
- School type: Public, Middle School
- Superintendent: Craig Olsen
- Principal: Hugh Duffy
- Grades: 6-8
- Enrollment: 450
- Colors: Black and Gold
- Mascot: Hurricanes
- Rival: Spooner Rails
- Website: ms.hayward.k12.wi.us

Hayward Middle School (HMS) is a middle school that serves students in and around Hayward, Wisconsin.

== Academics ==
Hayward Community Schools are recognized as offering "What Parents Want": academic strength, accreditation, recognition of excellence by the United States Department of Education or another national foundation, competitive salaries for teachers, a commitment to instruction evidenced by expenditures on instruction and on library/media services, and small class sizes. HMS has been awarded in the Wisconsin School of Recognition Award for the 2012-2013 school year. This award recognizes the education of low-income families.

== Clubs and organizations ==
Student involvement is encouraged by the establishment of several clubs and organizations. Forensics, band, Class Board, Choir, National Junior Honor Society and many other organizations that are run by students, staff, or combinations of students and staff.

== Sports ==
Students at Hayward Middle School have opportunities to play many sports at a competitive level, under WIAA. Fall sports include men's soccer, men's football, women's golf, women's volleyball, and co-ed cross country running. Winter sports include men's and women's basketball, men's and women's hockey, and co-ed cross-country skiing. Spring sports include men's baseball, women's softball, men's golf, women's soccer, and co-ed track and field.
