= Otto J. M. Smith =

American academic (1917–2009)

- Born: August 6, 1917; Urbana, Illinois, US
- Died: May 10, 2009 (aged 91); Walnut Creek, California, US
- Education: University of Oklahoma; Stanford University
- Known for: Smith predictor Posicast Control; Phasable Enabler
- Awards: Guggenheim Fellow
- Scientific career
- Fields: Electrical engineering
- Workplaces: University of California
- Doctoral advisor: Joseph Carroll
- Doctoral students: Michael Athans; Tércio Pacitti; Rabab Kreidieh Ward

Otto J. M. Smith (1917–2009) was an educator, inventor and author in the fields of engineering and electronics. He spent most of his career as a professor at University of California, Berkeley. Smith is probably best known for the invention of the Smith predictor.

== Early life ==
Smith was born in Urbana, Illinois on August 6, 1917. He received a B.S. in chemistry and electrical engineering from Oklahoma State University in 1938. He then attended Stanford University, earning a Ph.D. in power and high voltage in 1941. His doctoral advisor was Joseph Carroll.

== Career ==
=== Chronology of appointments ===
- Research Engineer, Smith and Sun, to present.
- Technical Consultant, 123phase Inc., to present.
- Professor University of California, Berkeley since 1947, emeritus since 1988
- Professor, Escola Federal de Engenharia de Itajubá, Itajubá, Minas Gerais, Brasil, March-Sept., 1974.
- Visiting professor, Eindhoven University of Technology, The Netherlands, Jan.-Feb., 1974.
- NSF appointee, U.S.-Romania Cooperative Science Program. Sept.-Dec., 1973. Academia Studii Economica and Institutui Studii si Proiectari Energetici. Optimum long-term economic planning.
- Visiting lecturer, Escola Federal de Engenharia de Itajubá, Itajubá, Minas Gerais, Brasil, and University of Chile, Santiago, Chile, 1971.
- Senior research fellow in Economics and Engineering, Monash University, Melbourne, State of Victoria, Australia, 1966–1967.
- Guggenheim Fellow, Technische Hochschule Darmstadt, Germany, 1960.
- Professor, Instituto Tecnológico de Aeronáutica, São José dos Campos, Estado de São Paulo, Brasil. 1954–56.
- Research engineer, Summit Corporation, Scranton, Pennsylvania, 1945–1947.
- Research engineer, Westinghouse Research Laboratories, Forest Hill, Pennsylvania 1944–1945.
- Assistant professor, Denver University, 1943–1944, taught microwaves and automatic control.
- Instructor, electrical engineering, Tufts University, Medford, Massachusetts. 1941–1943.
- Test engineer, Doble Engineering Company, Medford, Massachusetts. 1941–1943.
- Research assistant, H. J. Ryan High-Voltage Laboratory, Stanford University, Stanford, California, 1938–1941

=== Accomplishments ===
Smith is probably best known for the invention of the Smith predictor, a method of handling deadtime in feedback control systems: "A somewhat more complicated solution to the deadtime problem was proposed in 1957 by Otto Smith. Smith demonstrated how a mathematical model of the process could be used to endow the controller with prescience to generate just the right control moves without waiting to see how each move turned out. "

It was for this achievement that he was listed in InTech's "Leaders of the Pack" as one of the fifty most influential industry innovators since 1774. Other notable early achievements of Smith were the purchase in 1951 of the rights to his sine-function generator, U.S. patent 2,748,278 by Hewlett Packard and in 1958, the publication of a technical textbook on feed back control systems by McGraw-Hill.

Smith developed methods of running three-phase induction motors on single-phase power. He also worked on methods of providing power to single phase supply lines from three phase generators. His first patent in this field, "Three-Phase Induction Motor with Single-Phase Power Supply", U.S. patent 4,792,740, was issued 20 December 1988. He coined the words "enabler" and "phaseable" and "semi-hex" to distinguish these techniques from traditional static phase conversion, rotary phase conversion and electronic means of synthesizing three phase voltages and current. These techniques allow the use of large three phase motors up to over 100 hp where only single-phase power is available. Beginning in 1976 all of his patents have been for devices to generate or conserve energy. Among his patents are designs of patents for solar generators, wind generators and high efficiency motors. That portion of the US patent database that is searchable by name (since 1975) lists 15 inventions by Smith in these fields. Smith has published over 150 papers. The list of patents in this article should be nearly complete.

== Honors ==
- Guggenheim Fellow, awarded in 1959
- R&D 100 Award in 1999 for technologically significant new product
- Listed in the “Leaders of the Pack” InTech's 50 most influential industry innovators since 1774
- Fellow, American Association for the Advancement of Science.
- Fellow, Institute of Electrical and Electronics Engineers
- Visiting research fellow in economics and engineering, Monash University, Victoria, Australia.
- Honor Societies: Sigma Xi, Phi Kappa Phi, Tau Beta Pi (Engr.), Phi Lambda Upsilon (Chemistry), and Eta Kappa Nu (EE).

== Patents ==
- U.S. patent 2,583,132 Jan. 22, 1949. “Inspection Apparatus”, X-Ray thickness gauge for steel rolling mill, jointly with William Altar.
- U.S. patent 2,748,278 May 29, 1956. “Sine-Wave Generator”. (HP Model 202A ultra-low frequency 0.01 Hz.
- U.S. patent 3,483,463 Dec. 9, 1969. “System and Method for Alternating Current Machines, and Apparatus Therefor”. (Variable-speed, Precision frequency, originally filed Dec. 5, 1952, Pat. Application No. 324,318.).
  - U.S. patent 2,829,333 April 1, 1956, “Constant-Frequency Alternating-Current Generators”, by Wilfred L. Turvey, All 8 claims were awarded to Otto J. M. Smith in Interference 89,735 decision Nov. 29, 1960.
  - U.S. patent 2,854,617 Sept. 30, 1958. “Frequency Control Apparatus for Alternators”. Leopold J. Johnson. All interference Claims awarded to Otto J.M. Smith.
  - U.S. patent 2,886,766 May 12, 1959. “Frequency Stabilization System”. by Donald K. Gibson. All interference Claims awarded to Otto J. M.Smith, December 1965.
  - U.S. patent 3,070,740 Dec.25, 1962, “Constant Frequency Generator”, by K. M. Chirgwin et al., (9 Claims dependent upon Smith 3,483,463.)
- U.S. patent 3,051,883 Aug. 28, 1962. “Dead-Beat Response, Resonant Load, Control System and Method”. (Posicast control, 30 claims.)
- U.S. patent 3,060,378 Oct. 23, 1962. “Method and Apparatus for Generating a Signal and a System for Utilizing the Same”. (Complex-Zero Generator, 38 claims.)
- U.S. patent 3,084,859 April 9, 1963. “Number Storage Apparatus and Method”. (Phase-shift Counter.) (28 claims.)
- U.S. patent 3,141,982 July 21, 1964. “Control System for Use in Control of Loops With Dead Time”. (Dead-Time Stabilization) * 3,241,129 Mar. 15, 1966. “Delay Line”. 29 claims, jointly with Richard Dye.
- U.S. patent 3,388,305 June 11, 1968. “System, Apparatus and Method for Improving the Stability of Synchronous Machines”. (Optimal Excitation Control, 101 claims.)
- U.S. patent 3,526,761 Sept. 1, 1970. “Method, Apparatus and System for the Identification of the Relationship Between Two Signals”. (41 claims.)
- U.S. patent 3,529,174 Sept. 15, 1970. “Power System With Transient Control and Method”. (94 claims, switched capacitors).
- U.S. patent 3,662,251 May 9, 1972. “Method and System For Measuring Acceleration and Velocity”. (47 claims).
- U.S. patent 3,662,252 May 9, 1972. “Tachometer and Method For Obtaining a Signal Indicative Of Alternator Shaft Speed”. (25 claims.)
- 3,742,391, June 26, 1973. “Method, Apparatus and System for the Identification of the Relationship Between Two Signals”. (13 claims.)
- Brazil Pat. No. 7,806,173. Sept. 20, 1978, “Sistema Colector Solar”.
- U.S. patent 4,117,682 Oct. 3, 1978. “Solar Collector System”. (Multiple towers, 52 claims.)
- Brazil Pat. No. 7,806,485. Sept. 29, 1978, “Sistema De Energia Solar”.
- U.S. patent 4,164,123 Aug. 14, 1979. “Solar Thermal Electric Power Plant”. (42 claims.)
- U.S. patent 4,204,407 May 27, 1980. “Heated Piping System for a Fusible Salt Heat Exchange Fluid in a Solar Power Plant”.
- U.S. patent 4,219,729 Aug. 26, 1980. “Method of Aligning and Locating the Mirrors of a Collector Field With Respect to a Receptor Tower”. (20 claims.)
- U.S. patent 4,247,182 Jan. 27, 1981. “Heliostat With a Protective Enclosure”. (24 claims.)
- U.S. patent 4,249,386 Feb.10, 1981. “Apparatus for Providing Radiative Heat Rejection From a Working Fluid Used in a Rankine Cycle Type System”. Joint with Phyllis S. Smith.
- U.S. patent 4,330,714. May 17, 1982. “Wind Turbine System”. (12 claims.)
- Design U.S. patent D267,951 Feb. 15, 1983. “Wind Turbine System”.
- “Heliostato con una Caja Protectora”, (Heliostat With a Protective Enclosure) Mexico Certificate of Invention, August 19, 1980.
- Mexico Certificate of Invention No. 5159. April 7, 1983.“Mejoras En Heliostato Con Una Caja Protectora”.
- Mexico Certificate of Invention No. 101442. June 26, 1985. “Aparato para Proporcionar la Eliminacion del Calor Radiative a Partir de un Fluido Operante Que Se Usa en un Sistema del Tipe de Ciclo Rankine”, (Apparatus for Providing Radiative Heat Rejection From a Working Fluid Used in a Rankine Cycle Type System). Joint with Phyllis S. Smith.
- Mexico Certificate of Invention No. 101538, June 13, 1985. “Mejoras a Sistema de Calentamiento Para Red de Tuberia Calentada por Fluido de Intercambio Termico de Sal Fusible en una Instalacion de Energia Solar”, (Heated Piping System for a Fusible Salt Heat Exchange Fluid in a Solar Power Plant.)
- Egypt Pat. No. 16390, July 30, 1986. “Solar Collector System”.
- Egypt Pat. No. 16391, July 30, 1986. “Solar Thermal Electric Power Plant”.
- Mexico Certificate of Invention No. 101821. Sept. 5, 1986. “Um Metodo Para Alinear y Colocar los Espejos de un Campo Colector con Respecto a una Torre Receptora” (Method of Aligning and Locating the Mirrors of a Collector Field With Respect to a Receptor Tower).
- U.S. patent 4,792,740 Dec. 20, 1988. “Three-Phase Induction Motor With Single Phase Power Supply”. (44 claims.)
- U.S. patent 5,300,870 Apr. 5, 1994. “Three-Phase Motor Control”. (69 claims.)
- Chinese Certificate of Patent For Invention Cert. No. 65335. Patent Application No. 95105163.6 dated April 18, 1995. Duration 20 years from Date of Filing.
- U.S. patent 5,545,965 Aug. 13, 1996. “Three Phase Motor Operated From a Single-Phase Power Supply and Phase Converter”. (26 claims.)
- U.S. patent 6,025,693 Feb. 15. 2000. “Motor Starter”. (54 claims.)
- U.S. patent 6,049,188 Apr. 11, 2000. “Single-Phase Motor Starters”. (50 claims.)
- Brazilian Pat.No. 9304033-4. Apr. 17, 2001. “Motor de Inducão Elétrica de Rotor em Forma de Gaiola”. (Three-Phase Cage-Rotor Induction Motor Control.)
- U.S. patent 6,356,041 B1. Mar. 12, 2002. “Master Three-Phase Induction Motor with Satellite Three-Phase Motors Driven by a Single-Phase Supply”. (24 Claims.)
- U.S. patent 7,023,167 B2. Apr. 4, 2006. “Control Arrangement for an Induction Motor Compressor Having at Least Three Windings, a Torque-Augmentation Circuit a Starting Capacitor and a Resistive Element. (7 Claims.)

== Selected publications ==
- "Posicast Control of Damped Oscillatory Systems", Proceedings of the IRE, Sept. 1957 Volume: 45, Issue: 9 page(s): 1249–1255 ISSN 0096-8390
- "Feedback Control Systems" McGraw-Hill Series in Control Systems Engineering. McGraw-Hill, New York, New York, first edition, 1958
- "Sparse Solutions Using Hash Storage" Smith, O.J.M.; Makani, K.; Krishna, L.; IEEE Transactions on Power Apparatus and Systems, Volume PAS-91, Issue 4, July 1972 Page(s):1396–1404, Digital Object Identifier 10.1109/TPAS.1972.293271
- "Power System State Estimation" Smith, O.J.M.; IEEE Transactions on Power Apparatus and Systems Volume PAS-89, Issue 3, Part-I, March 1970 Page(s):363 - 379, Digital Object Identifier 10.1109/TPAS.1970.292713
- "Integration of Nonlinear Differential Systems with Wide Eigenvalue Range" Oswald, R.; Smith, O.J.M.; IEEE Transactions on Power Apparatus and Systems, Volume PAS-90, Issue 6, Nov. 1971 Page(s):2586–2589, Digital Object Identifier 10.1109/TPAS.1971.292909
- "Large Low-Cost Single-Phase Semi-hex Motors" by Otto J.M. Smith, IEEE Transactions on Energy Conversion, Vol 14, No. 4, December 1999, pp 1353–1358 Digital Object Identifier 10.1109/60.815072
- "High-Efficiency Single-Phase SEMIHEX Motors", by Otto J.M. Smith, Electrical Machines and Power Systems, Vol. 26, No. 6, July 1998 pp 573–584.
- "High-Efficiency Single-Phase Air Conditioner", California Energy Commission Report EISG No. P500-02-003F 15 February 2002, by Otto J.M. Smith.
- "High-Efficiency Three-Phase Motors Connected to Single-Phase supplies", Electrical Manufacturing and Coil Winding Conference, at The EMCW-2002 Expo. Oct. 15, 2002, Session No. 08, by Phyllis Sterling Smith and Otto J. M. Smith, Cincinnati, Ohio.
- Smith, O.J.M., "Single-Phase 40HP Pump Motor", Proc.52-nd Annual Regional Conference of ASAE/CSAE, Boise, Idaho, 18-20 Sept. 1997, ASAE Paper No. 97-102, St. Joseph, Mich.: ASAE.
- "High-Efficiency Air Conditione on Single Phase Electricity", California Energy Commission Preliminary Report EISG Grant #:53828A/04-08 by Otto J.M. Smith.
