= Round Lake (Wisconsin) =

- Interactive map of Round Lake
- Location: Sawyer County, Wisconsin
- Coordinates: 46.014°N 91.315°W
- Type: Lake
- Primary inflows: Spring-fed
- Surface area: 3,294 acres (1,333 ha)
- Average depth: ~33 ft (10 m)
- Max. depth: 74 ft (23 m)

Round Lake, or sometimes referred to as Big Round Lake, is a 3,294-acre spring-fed lake in Sawyer County, Wisconsin roughly 8 miles east of Hayward, Wisconsin. The lake is managed by the Town of Round Lake and the Wisconsin Department of Natural Resources. The lake has an average depth of roughly 33 ft and a maximum depth of 74 ft.

== History ==
The lake is part of a chain of glacially formed lakes in northern Wisconsin which were carved during the Last Ice Age. It is characterized for its round shape, and historically held the name of Gawawiegamag, meaning "lake is round" in Ojibwe. The lake was travelled extensively by the Ottawa before European settlement which started in the late 18th century. Beginning around 1784, the area around Round Lake became attractive to French trappers and settlers who relied on the lake and its connections to the Namekagon and Chippewa Rivers to transport their goods for trade and sale. Sawyer County was officially established in 1853, and neighboring towns would arise between then and 1913. These early towns heavily relied on logging and fur-trading, with agriculture playing a growing role in modern times. The lake is noted for being exceptionally clear. There are three boat launches located around the lake.

== Wildlife and habitat ==
The lake provides excellent habitat for a variety of freshwater fish and wildlife, including:

- Largemouth bass
- Smallmouth bass
- Walleye
- Panfish
- Muskellunge
- Northern pike
- Deer
- Beaver
- Otter
- Eagles
- Heron
- Loons
- Toads
