= Order of Military Merit (Brazil) =

Military award

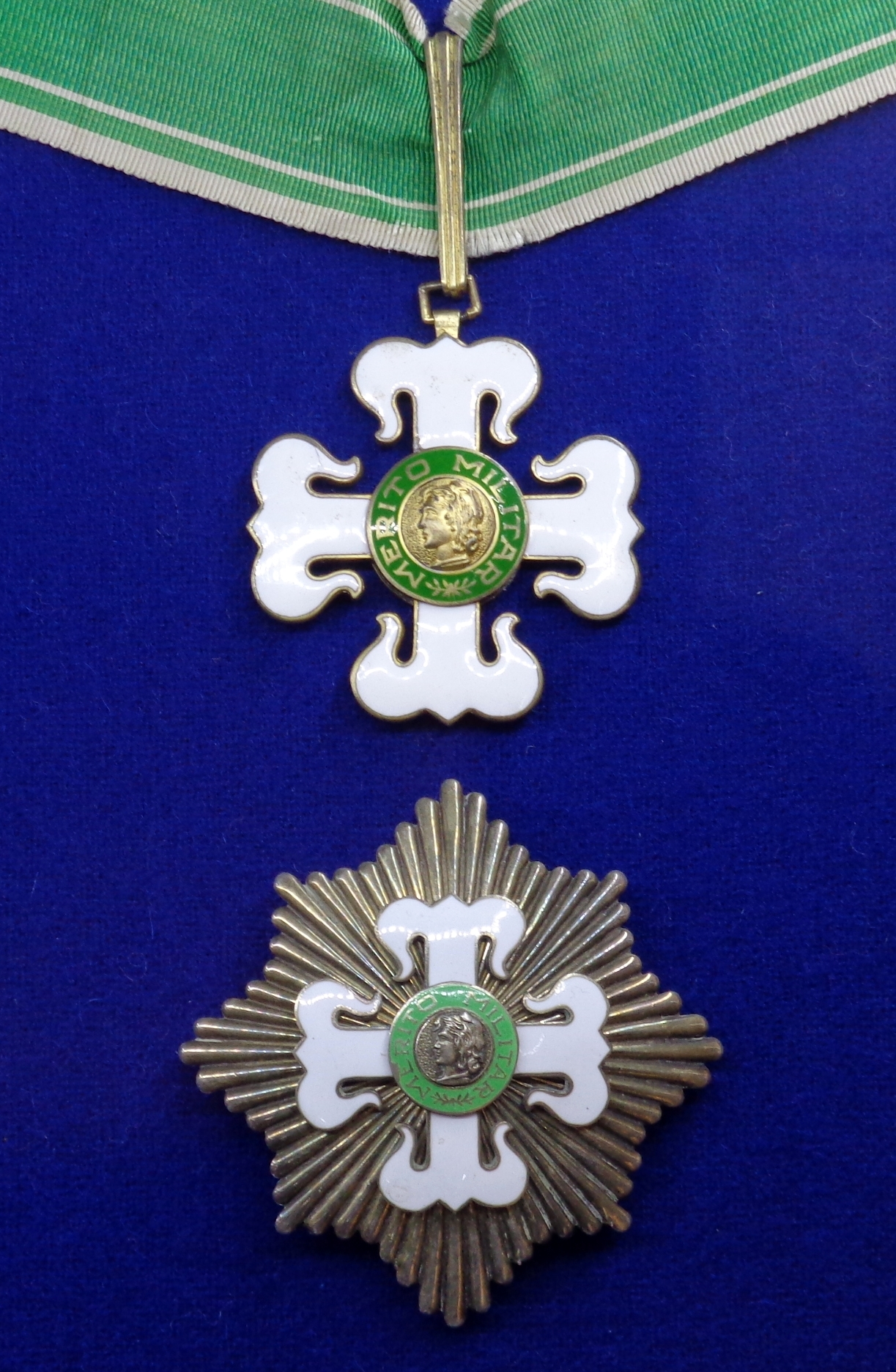
- Grand officer insignia
- Type: State Order
- Awarded for: Distinguished service to Brazil
- Country: Brazil
- Presented by: Brazilian Army
- Eligibility: Members of the Brazilian Army or foreign armies
- Established: 11 July 1934; 92 years ago
- Ribbon bar of the order

The Order of Military Merit (Portuguese: Ordem do Mérito Militar) is an award of the Brazilian Army, established on 11 July 1934 by President Getúlio Vargas. The order is presented in five grades and recognizes distinguished service and exceptional contributions to Brazil by members of the Brazilian Army and the armies of friendly nations.

The grades, in descending order, are:

- Grand Cross
- Grand Officer
- Commander
- Officer
- Knight

== Notable recipients ==
Notable recipients
Name	Nationality	Grade	Date	Comment
Lars Grael	Brazilian	Officer	31 March 1999	
Edward Almond	American			
Henry H. Arnold	American			
Kaúlza de Arriaga	Portuguese	Grand Officer		
Amaro Soares Bittencourt	Brazilian			
Waldemar Levy Cardoso	Brazilian			
Frank P.Connelly Jr.	American			
Charles de Gaulle	French			
Carlos Alberto dos Santos Cruz	Brazilian			
Ciro Ferreira Gomes	Brazilian			
Hernán Terrazas Céspedes	Bolivian	Grand Officer		
Dwight D. Eisenhower	American	Grand Cross	5 August 1946	
John W. Foss	American	Grand Cross		
Paul L. Freeman, Jr.	American			
Leonard T. Gerow	American			
William C. Gribble, Jr.	American			
Elvin R. Heiberg III	American			
Jonas H. Ingram	American			
Allan Ker VC	Scottish			
Thomas B. Larkin	American			
Lyman Lemnitzer	American			
Luiz Inácio Lula da Silva	Brazilian			
George C. Marshall	American	Grand Cross		
Joseph T. McNarney	American			
Raymond T. Odierno	American	Grand Officer		
James Garesche Ord	American	Grand Officer		
General Raheel Sharif	Pakistani			COAS Army
Lemuel C. Shepherd, Jr.	American	Grand Officer	1959	
Walter Bedell Smith	American	Grand Cross	6 September 1947	General
Gordon R. Sullivan	American			
Richard Horner Thompson	American			
Tércio Pacitti	Brazilian			
Togo D. West, Jr.	American			
Frederick L. Wieseman	American			
Jair Bolsonaro	Brazilian			
Paul Wynnyk	Canadian	Grand Officer	28 July 2018	Lieutenant-General
Bertrand of Orléans-Braganza	Brazilian			
Siphiwe Nyanda	South African	Commander		General
Donald Weldon Brann	American			
