= Santer =

Santer is a surname. Notable people with the surname include:

- Anna Santer (born 1975), Italian cross-country skier
- Benjamin D. Santer, climate researcher at Lawrence Livermore National Laboratory
- Bradley Santer (born 1982), Australian figure skater
- Diederick Santer (born 1969), British television producer
- Jacques Santer (born 1937), Luxembourgish politician
- Mark Santer (born 1936), Anglican bishop
- Patrick Santer (born 1970), Luxembourgish lawyer and politician for the Christian Social People's Party
- Saskia Santer (born 1977), Italian biathlete

== See also ==
- Nathalie Santer-Bjørndalen (born 1972), Italian biathlete
