= Rich Brightman =

American Singer-songwriter

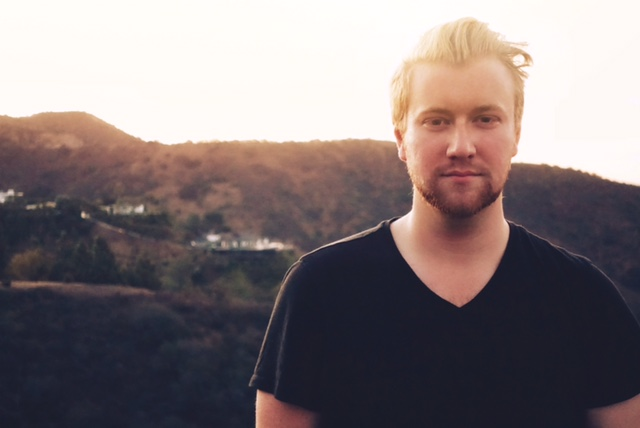
- October 2016, Los Angeles

Background information
- Birth name: Richard J Brightman
- Born: April 17, 1990 (age 34); Bay Shore, New York
- Genres: Rock, Pop, R&B
- Occupation(s): Singer-songwriter, music producer
- Instrument(s): Vocals, guitar, piano, bass, synthesiser, drum machine, digital audio workstation
- Years active: 2008–present
- Labels: Rich Brightman; MotherShipSound

Rich Brightman (born April 17, 1990) is an American singer-songwriter.

== Early life ==
He was born in Bay Shore, New York and raised on Long Island. Rich started writing songs on guitar in his childhood bedroom on Long Island before after dropping on music theory classes at Bay Shore High School and started to learn audio and mix engineering the school's recording studio during study hall, lunch, and his after school hours.

Rich's mother, Sherry Brightman, gifted him a MacBook Pro for his high school graduation.

== Career ==
Rich saved his high school graduation money along with his summer job earnings to buy studio equipment of his own to start work on his debut self-titled album. Rich released his first single "Lighter Than Air" on August 7, 2009, later releasing his first full self-titled album Rich Brightman on July 23, 2010. Rich attended Salve Regina University while writing his second album "II" released November 29, 2013 featuring rock alternative/pop tracks. During 2014–2016 Rich worked on his third release "III" which was released on Christmas Eve 2016

== Discography ==
=== Rich Brightman ===
- Introduction
- Casablanca
- Lighter Than Air
- Hit The Lights
- Beautiful Night
- Montauk
- You & Other Drugs
- Love Letter
- Summer

=== II ===
- Aura
- Spark
- Drive
- Anchor
- Flight
- Posie
- Cozumel
- Blur

=== III ===
- FLESH 4 FLESH
- HIT LIST
- RUN
- WALDEINSAMKEIT
- LATE NIGHTS
- FIRST SIGHT
- IKTSUARPOK
- ONCE MORE
- MONO NO AWARE
