= Richard Tomson =

English mariner

- Occupation: Mariner

Richard Tomson (fl. 1588) was an English mariner.

== Biography ==
Tomson may presumably be identified with the Richard Tomson of Yarmouth (July 1570; State Papers, Dom. Eliz., lxxiii. 151), nephew of John Tomson of Sherringham. The mother of this Richard Tomson was an Antwerp woman, and one of her Flemish nephews, James Fesser, was a shipowner at Beeston. These Fessers, again, were cousins of John Fisher of Cley. Richard Tomson was for some years engaged in the Mediterranean trade, and in 1582 was involved in litigation with the Turkey company. He was also part owner of the Jesus of London, which was captured and taken to Algiers (ib. clxxviii. 83–4), to which in 1583 Tomson made a voyage to ransom the prisoners. In January 1588 he was in Flanders, and was there solicited by some Spaniards to undertake the delivery of a great quantity of iron ordnance, for which he would be handsomely paid. He refused their offer, and, knowing that the ordnance was for furnishing the Armada, informed Francis Walsingham of it, so that he might prevent the export. He appears to have corresponded confidentially with Walsingham, and may have been a kinsman of Laurence Tomson, Walsingham's secretary. In the summer of 1588 he was lieutenant of the Margaret and John, a merchant ship commanded by Captain John Fisher against the Armada, and mentioned as closely engaged with the galleon of D. Pedro de Valdes during the night after the first battle, in the battle of 23 July, in the capture of the galleass at Calais, and in the battle of Gravelines, of which he wrote an interesting account to Walsingham (Defeat of the Spanish Armada, Navy Records Society, freq.) Afterwards he was employed to negotiate with Don Pedro and other prisoners as to the terms of their ransom. On 3 April 1593 he wrote to Lord Burghley as to a permission lately given for the export of ordnance. This, he suspected, was for the Spaniards, and might cause trouble (State Papers, Dom. Eliz., ccxliv. 116). Towards the end of the century he was living in London, corresponding occasionally with Robert Cecil. It is possible that he was the Captain Tomson with the notorious pirate Peter Easton in 1611-12 (ib. James I, lx. 16; Docquet, 6 Feb. 1612); but the name is too common to render any identification certain.
