= Park Center (Hayward, Wisconsin) =

Performing arts center in Hayward, Wisconsin

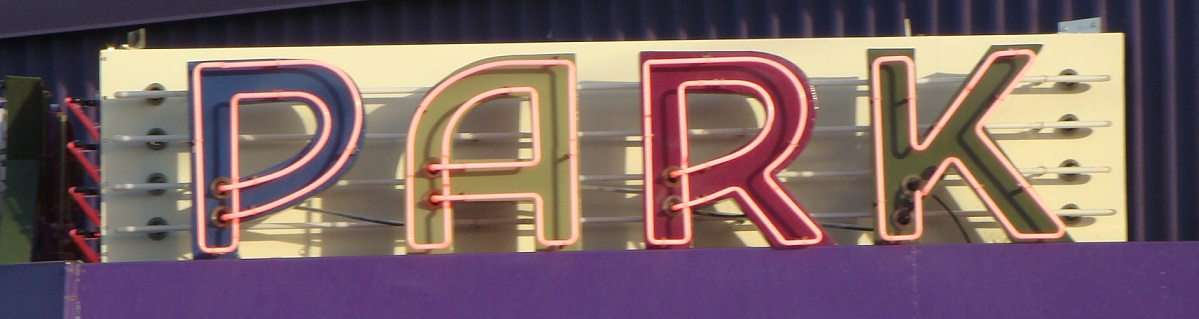
- The marquee sign of the Park Center
- Interactive map of Park Center
- Address: 15791 US Highway 63; Hayward, Wisconsin; United States
- Coordinates: 46°00′50.1″N 91°28′57.6″W
- Type: Performing arts center

Construction
- Opened: 1948

Website
- theparkcenter.com

The Park Center (or Park Theater) is a regional performing arts center in Hayward, Wisconsin, offering a variety of musical and artistic performances. The theatre is operated under the direction of the Cable Hayward Area Arts Council (CHARAC), a nonprofit organization formed in 1996 to bring together the art, artists and supporters of art in the area.

The theater was built in 1948, in what was known as Whitten Park. The first movie shown at the Park was Romance on the High Seas. The architecture and decor is decorative modernism. The Park Center has always been a movie theater, but was reorganized as a performing arts center in 2007.

The theatre has a digital audio board, with live recording capabilities.

Some of the notable artists to perform at the Park include Randy Sabien, Charlie Parr and Michael Gulezian.

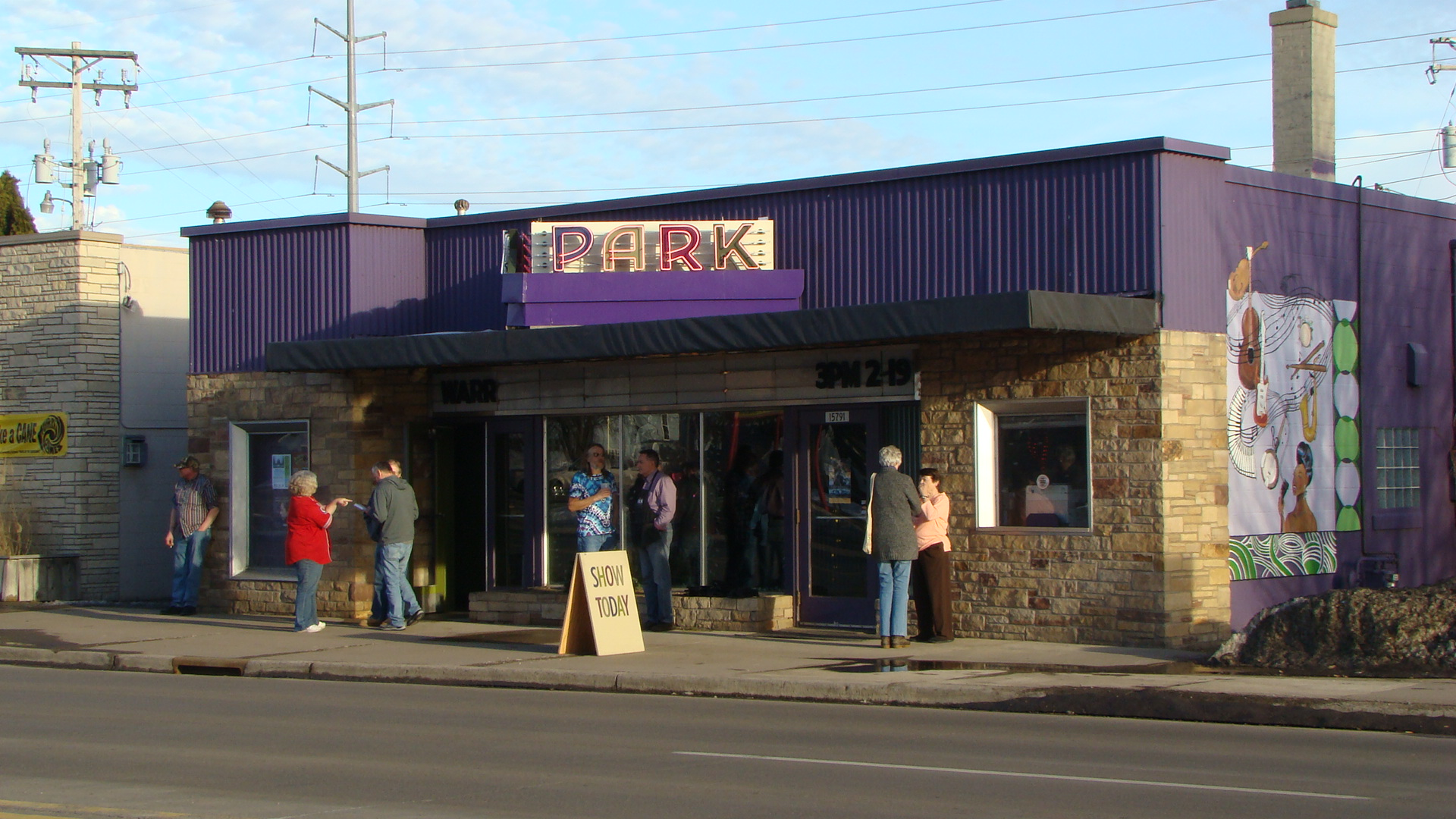
The Park Theatre
