= Italian campaign =

Italian campaign can refer to:

- Italian campaign of 1524–1525, a campaign during the Italian Wars
- Italian campaigns of the French Revolutionary Wars, 1796–1800 campaigns led by Napoleon Bonaparte and Alexander Suvorov
  - Napoleon's Italian campaign of 1796–1797
  - Napoleon's Marengo campaign
- Second Italian War of Independence, an 1859 campaign fought by Napoleon III of France and Kingdom of Sardinia against Austria
- Italian campaign (World War I), a campaign fought primarily by Italy against Austria-Hungary
- Italian campaign (World War II), a campaign begun after the Allied invasion of Sicily

== See also ==
- Italian War (disambiguation)
