= Sergio Bonaldi =

Italian biathlete (born 1978)

Personal information
- Nationality: Italian
- Born: 7 September 1978 (age 46); San Giovanni Bianco, Italy

Sport
- Sport: Biathlon

Sergio Bonaldi (born 7 September 1978) is an Italian former biathlete. He competed in the men's sprint event at the 2006 Winter Olympics.
