= Richard Earl Thompson =

American painter

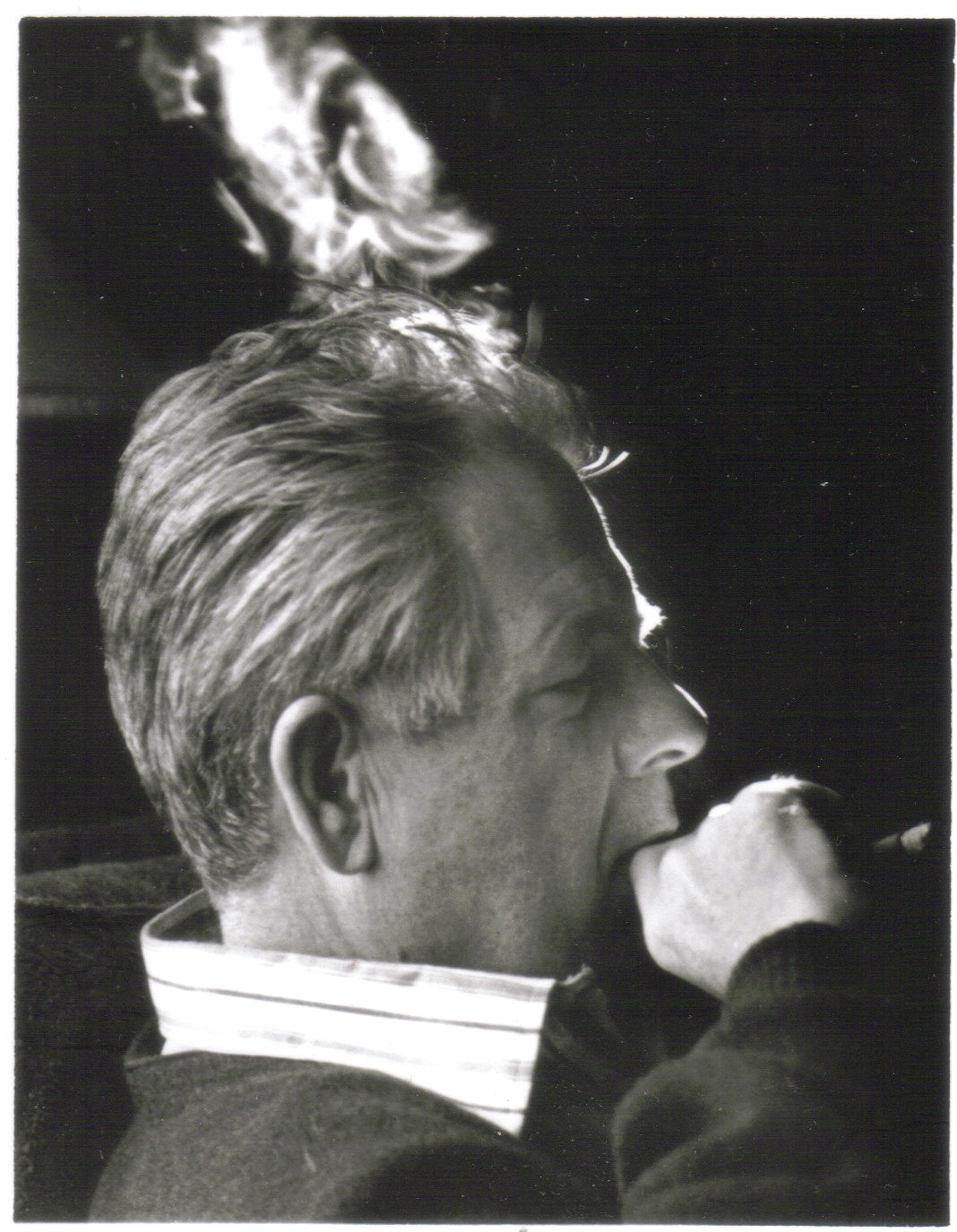
- Born: September 26, 1914; Oak Park, Illinois
- Died: August 6, 1991 (aged 76); Truckee, California
- Resting place: Walworth Cemetery, Walworth, Wisconsin
- Education: Chicago Academy of Fine Arts, American Academy of Art, and the Art Institute of Chicago
- Known for: Painting, Drawing and Illustration
- Style: Impressionism
- Spouse: Mary Munn

Richard Earl Thompson (September 26, 1914 – August 6, 1991) was a 20th-century American Impressionist painter who began his career as a commercial illustrator in Chicago, Illinois. In 1959, he broke away from a career as a commercial illustrator, which began in 1933, to pursue Impressionist painting. He was a prolific painter, sometimes compared stylistically to Claude Monet.

== Early years ==
Thompson was born at West Suburban Hospital in Oak Park, Illinois. Richard's father, Abijah Snyder Thompson, was an illustrator and commercial art director for Montgomery Ward in Chicago. At a young age Thompson was introduced to many of his father's colleagues, sparking an early interest in the arts. He started to draw pencil sketches at age eight after watching his father draw at home in the evening. Richard's father also shared with his son his love for fishing and nature. When it was seasonable, they would travel from Chicago to Lake Geneva, Wisconsin, on weekend fishing trips. The nature scenes he observed on these excursions became subjects for his sketches. At age ten, Richard awoke a couple of hours before his parents on Christmas morning to find a gift with his name under the Christmas tree. Upon opening, he found it to be his own paint box together with canvas board, brushes, and paints. He set up a still life with an apple, orange, and a piece of drapery fabric from his mother's sewing room. He painted for about two hours, and when his parents awoke they saw Richard's first finished painting. They were so proud of his achievement that it served to intensify his desire to paint.

His mother, Vera Thompson, was interested in the arts and music and encouraged Richard as a vocalist. He had already started to develop a career as a boy soprano by age ten and sang on the Blue Network on NBC's The National Farm and Home Hour radio program. Opportunities for further vocal training arose, but with his changing voice and his interest in art, Thompson made a decision to pursue art rather than music.

== Education ==
Thompson's mother was instrumental in furthering his art interests, taking him to the Chicago Academy of Fine Arts where she introduced him to Carl Werntz, the school owner and director. After Werntz looked at sketches by Richard, he was invited to enter day school. He was 15, with a diversified and tightly scheduled boyhood, looking forward to attending high school and playing football, only considering art school on Saturdays. Before making the decision he wrote to two American Impressionist painters he admired, Edward Redfield and George Gardner Symons, who became known as leaders of the Impressionist clan. Both wrote back giving him encouragement and advice.

Unlike his father, Richard did not yearn to be an illustrator or art director. His desire was to pursue the fine arts he had seen in Chicago exhibitions. He and his father spent a great deal of time talking about paintings and artists and attending every exhibit that came to Chicago. One exhibition of Aldro Hibbard at the Carson Pirie Scott & Co. department store stood out in his mind and had enormous impact on his career. The public also appreciated the exhibition, as it sold out in two days.

In 1929, the stock market crashed on Wall Street, leading to a worldwide economic depression. The Depression drastically changed the art world and put an abrupt end to the Impressionist movement to make way for a new direction called Modernism.

In 1930, Thompson, age 16, entered both Oak Park High School and art school at the Chicago Academy of Fine Arts, attending on Saturdays during the school year and day classes during the summer. Painter Frederick Milton Grant, who was a student of William Merritt Chase, was a mentor to Richard. He was surrounded by members of the Hoosier Group, a group of Impressionist painters who painted the Indiana landscape. He watched Carl Krafft, John Spellman, Jess Hobby, and Charles Dahlgren paint canvas after canvas. Richard often visited Hobby in his Oak Park studio and learned additional painting techniques not taught by Grant.

In 1932, Thompson, age 18, entered art school for a two-year term at the American Academy of Art in Chicago. There were 21 instructors and 400 students. The academy had a reputation for training competent illustrators and designers. He was most inspired by two of them – Edmund Kellogg and Frederick Milton Grant. Thompson now saw his future career path temporarily shift to illustrator during the Depression economy.

== Commercial illustrator ==
In 1933, after graduating from Oak Park High School, Richard's first job was with Esquire as a commercial artist. At night he was a student of Louis Ritman at the School of the Art Institute of Chicago. At work he was learning the routine required of a commercial artist and at school he was learning both commercial and easel painting techniques. He knew the desire to launch a fine arts career would have to wait.

The next twenty-six years, 1933-1959, would be the duration of his commercial art career in illustration. He joined with a layout man, Walter Wenzel, and together they freelanced as commercial artists. Thompson's next job was with a large studio in Chicago, Vogue-Wright Studios. In addition to freelancing in the ad business, he taught at the American Academy of Art in 1935-37.

During this period, in 1936, Thompson met the woman with whom he would share his life and career. In 1937, after dating for one year, Mary Munn and Richard married. They had three sons, Richard Earl Jr., Thomas Daniel, and Robert Bruce, who all became integral to supporting and inspiring their father's career as a fine art American Impressionist.

Chicago was filled with illustrators, and the advertising business was a competitive, stress-filled life with sixteen-hour workdays. Thompson felt it was important to maintain the life he and his family enjoyed living in Wisconsin, so he commuted 150 miles by train daily.

Thompson worked in the studio of Haddon Sundblom creating ad campaigns for Coca-Cola that graced the back covers of The Saturday Evening Post. Thompson painted much of the original material, and Sundblom put on the finish. Thompson remembers Sundblom as a great talent and continued to work for him during the war years until 1944.

In the mid-forties and fifties, Thompson owned and operated his own studio and advertising business in Chicago. He went back to freelancing with friend and fellow artist, Jim Sigmund. The twosome created hundreds of trade ads. During this time Thompson was commissioned by the United States Treasury Department to paint war bond posters. He worked on large advertising and promotional campaigns for Coca-Cola, Anheuser-Busch, Standard Oil, Miller Brewing Company, and many other firms until 1959. During this time he kept a watchful eye on the American art scene, never giving up his desire to become a fine art painter.

== Fine art painter ==
In 1959, illustrations in commercial art were being replaced by photography. Thompson now had reason to become a fine arts painter. At forty-five he gave up a handsome salary and commercial art career to pursue what he had set out to do when he was fifteen years old – paint. Talent, courage, inspiration, and family support enabled him to make his final break from commercial art.

The next seventeen years, 1960-1977, were spent traveling, painting, and establishing representation in galleries throughout the United States. Richard and his wife Mary traveled by car to Arizona and he would set up an easel on the side of the road to paint in plein air style. Travel also included a trip to Portugal, Spain, and France in 1970 with his youngest son Bruce, who is a photographer. Richard's desire was to experience the light quality and essence of the countryside painted by the great European Impressionists he admired. Richard and Bruce visited the Louvre in Paris and the Prado in Madrid. As a result of the trip, a show was produced and well received by the public at a one-man exhibition at Veldman Art Gallery in Milwaukee. Two years later, in 1972, father and son traveled to Israel and France to gather new material for future paintings. Another new body of paintings was produced from the second trip. Trips within the U.S. included the vividly colored New England states in the fall and the beautiful spring budding of the Southeast.

Impressionism had fallen out of popularity, so Thompson needed to convince his prospective dealers that his work would sell. He was confident his work had merit and strove to express himself artistically by relying on years of extensive training. He continued to work hard, even experimenting with painting styles other than Impressionism, but he was not satisfied. The art he had loved as a boy was in his heart and soul. He knew nothing else would have sincerity.

In 1977, since he was successfully showing and selling his paintings in eight notable U.S. galleries, he felt he couldn't spread himself much thinner. He seemed to be spending more time framing, crating, and shipping than painting. The market for his paintings had grown every year, and he wondered how could he keep up with the demand. He found himself at a crossroads and contemplated his next move.

Thompson's oldest son Richard Jr. offered his expertise in sales. His solution to the dilemma facing his father was to establish a business plan and start his own gallery. The Richard Thompson Gallery at 80 Maiden Lane in San Francisco, California, was opened in an upscale shopping district of the city. Richard Jr. was the director.

== Achievements ==
The grand opening exhibit of Richard Thompson Gallery was on November 19, 1977. In February 1978 Thompson was interviewed by Hugh Downs on the National Public Television program “Over Easy.” Thompson's career catapulted. Paintings sales in the new gallery were brisk, and Thompson enjoyed a lifestyle that allowed him freedom to paint.

In July 1979 a feature article in The Milwaukee Journal, written by art critic James Auer, gave Thompson the title of “Wisconsin's Monet.” He admitted he was influenced by the great Impressionist Claude Monet. Thompson also felt much more could be explored after the era of Impressionism ended. This is where he felt he was the continuing link and could further the work started by the early Impressionists. He was devoted to colors created by the sun. “Color is then unlimited, as the sun is ever changing,” he said.

A biography titled Richard Earl Thompson, American Impressionist: A Prophetic Odyssey in Paint was published in 1982 and written by art historian Patricia Jobe Pierce. During the summer of 1990 a film crew visited his summer home in northern Wisconsin to film his life, loves, painting, and philosophy. Unfortunately, he did not live to see the film because he died from pancreatic cancer on August 6, 1991. The film is titled American Impressionist, Richard Earl Thompson from the Holiday Video Library, a division of Finley Holiday Films.

Thompson produced more than 1,525 numbered paintings in his fine arts career. He had numerous reviews, and his works adorned many covers of accredited magazines such as Reader's Digest, American Art Review, Southwest Art, Western Art Digest, Midwest Art, International Fine Art Collector, and Country Gentleman. Thompson's paintings were chosen for eight covers on The Journal of the American Medical Association (JAMA) magazine, with comprehensive articles included for each. He was a regular on the covers of Yankee Magazine and Fortune's Almanac.

Thompson had eighteen one-man exhibits and was collected in private and corporate collections worldwide. Among them are The Lewer Agency, Kansas City, Missouri; Milwaukee Art Museum, Milwaukee, Wisconsin; Naval Art Collection, Pentagon, Washington, D.C.; R.W. Norton Art Gallery, Shreveport, Louisiana;, Leigh Yawkey Woodson Art Museum, Wausau, Wisconsin; and The Southland Corporation, Dallas, Texas. His work was exhibited in three museums – Leigh Yawkey Woodson Art Museum in Wausau, Wisconsin, the Norton Art Museum & Gallery, Shreveport, Louisiana and Charles Allis Art Museum, Milwaukee, Wisconsin.

President John F. Kennedy's tragic event in 1963, marked 50 years in 2013. Charlie Scheips, the author of the "Art Set" column of the New York Social Diary, wrote a retrospect to 1963 and the turbulent times that forever changed our country and the impact it made on the art world. Artist Richard Earl Thompson was included in his article which can be seen below in External links.

His thirty years as an American Impressionist painter were his happiest. Thompson remained an avid fisherman throughout his life and enjoyed classical music and good cigars, especially while painting. He maintained homes on waterfronts throughout his lifetime. One was a summer home on Big Round Lake near Hayward, Wisconsin in the northern part of the state, and the other was a winter retreat in the Florida Keys on the Gulf of Mexico, both equipped with painting studios designed by son and architect, Dan Thompson .
