= Richard Horner Thompson =

American general

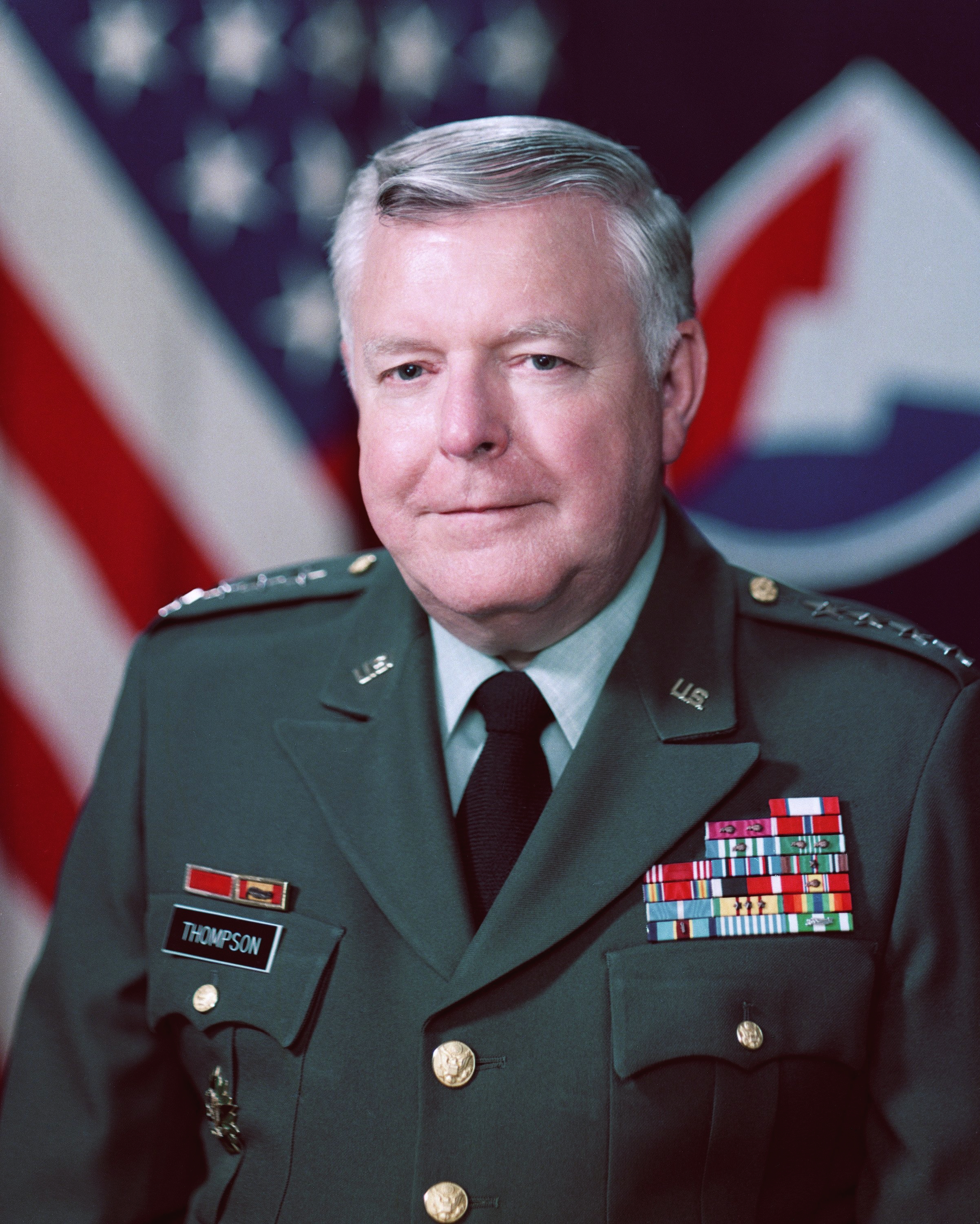
- General Richard Horner Thompson
- Born: 24 September 1926; New York City, New York
- Died: 21 February 2016 (aged 89); Fairfax, Virginia
- Burial place: Arlington National Cemetery
- Spouse: Patricia Thompson ()
- Military career
- Allegiance: United States
- Branch: United States Army
- Service years: 1944–1987
- Rank: General
- Commands: United States Army Materiel Command; Defense Logistics Service Center; 503d Supply and Transport Battalion
- Conflicts: World War II; Korean War; Vietnam War
- Awards: Army Distinguished Service Medal (2); Legion of Merit (3); Bronze Star Medal

Richard Horner Thompson (24 September 1926 – 21 February 2016) was a United States Army general.

== Early life ==
Thompson was born on 24 September 1926, in New York City, New York and died on 21 February 2016, in Fairfax, Virginia.

== Military career ==
Thompson entered in the United States Army in November 1944 and advanced to the grade of staff sergeant before being commissioned a second lieutenant. He served first at Fort Hamilton and then was assigned to Japan, where he performed duties as the Army Exchange Officer at Kokura. He returned to the United States in March 1957 to take the Associate Infantry Company Officer Course at the United States Army Infantry School. Upon completion, he was assigned to Fort Chaffee, Arkansas. In the two years he was stationed there, Thompson attained a Bachelor of Arts degree in Social Science from the College of the Ozarks (now the University of the Ozarks).

From September 1959 to May 1960, Thompson attended the Quartermaster Officer Advanced Course at Fort Lee, Virginia, and from there was assigned to Korea, serving until August 1961 as S-4, 321st U.S. Army Security Agency Battalion at Camp Red Cloud. From Korea, he attended the United States Air Force Air University, Air Command and Staff College, and until August 1965 worked in multiple jobs as a staff officer in the Office of the Deputy Chief of Staff for Logistics (DCSLOG). He enrolled at the George Washington University at that time and graduated with a master's degree in Public Administration in June 1968. Prior to the completion of his tour at the Department of the Army, he also went on temporary duty to the Army Logistics Management Center at Fort Lee in April 1965 and completed the Army Supply Management Course.

Thompson then attended the Armed Forces Staff College. From there he was reassigned to Frankfurt, Germany, in October 1966, where he commanded the 503d Supply and Transport Battalion, 3rd Armored Division. He remained in Germany until August 1967 when he returned to Washington to attend the National War College. He was then assigned as a logistics systems officer with the Assistant Vice Chief of Staff and then as Chief of the Tactical Support Systems Group.

In April 1970, Thompson served as Commander of the United States Army Inventory Control Center in South Vietnam. Returning from overseas, he was assigned as Commander of the Defense Logistics Service Center, Battle Creek, Michigan, until July 1973. From September 1972 to February 1973, he also served as Commander of the Defense Property Disposal Service, which he established and activated. In July 1973, he was reassigned to HQDA as Director of Logistics Plans, Operations and Systems, DCSLOG. In 1975, he became the Director of Supply and Maintenance, DCSLOG.

In July 1977, Thompson became the first Commander of the United States Army Troop Support and Aviation Materiel Readiness Command, an organization formed by the merger of two Army Materiel Command major subordinate commands—the Aviation Systems Command and the Troop Support Command.

In August 1980, Thompson was reassigned to HQDA as Assistant Deputy Chief of Staff for Logistics. One year later, Thompson was promoted to lieutenant general and became the Army DCSLOG. On 29 June 1984, Thompson received his fourth star and began his assignment as Commander of the United States Army Materiel Command, a position he held until his retirement in April 1987.

Awards and decorations awarded to Thompson include the Army Distinguished Service Medal with Oak Leaf Cluster, the Legion of Merit with two Oak Leaf Clusters, the Bronze Star Medal, the Joint Service Commendation Medal with one Oak Leaf Cluster, the Army Commendation Medal with three Oak Leaf Clusters, designation as an Army Logistician, the Brazilian Grand Master of the Order of Military Merit, the Spanish Grand Cross of the Order of Military Merit, the Korean Order of National Security Merit Tong-II Medal, and the Brazilian Grand Commander of the Order of Military Merit.
