= Rich Thompson (pitcher, born 1958) =

American baseball player

- Pitcher
- Born: November 1, 1958 (age 67); New York, New York, U.S.
- Batted: Right Threw: Right

Professional debut
- MLB: April 28, 1985, for the Cleveland Indians
- CPBL: May 12, 1993, for the Wei Chuan Dragons

Last appearance
- MLB: April 22, 1990, for the Montreal Expos
- CPBL: August 23, 1993, for the Wei Chuan Dragons

MLB statistics
- Win–loss record: 3–10
- Earned run average: 5.05
- Strikeouts: 45

CPBL statistics
- Win–loss record: 1–7
- Earned run average: 5.92
- Strikeouts: 16
- Stats at Baseball Reference

Teams
- Cleveland Indians (1985); Montreal Expos (1989–1990); Wei Chuan Dragons (1993)

Richard Neil Thompson (born November 1, 1958) is an American former professional baseball relief pitcher. He played in Major League Baseball (MLB) for the Cleveland Indians (1985) and Montreal Expos (1989–1990). He also played in the Chinese Professional Baseball League (CPBL) for the Wei Chuan Dragons in 1993. In his MLB career, he made 77 appearances and went 3–10 with a 5.05 ERA.
