= Richard Thomson (theologian) =

Richard Thomson, sometimes spelled Thompson, was a Dutch-born English theologian and translator. He was Fellow of Clare Hall, Cambridge and the translator of Martial's epigrams and among the "First Westminster Company" charged by James I of England with the translation of the first 12 books of the King James Version of the Bible. He was also known for his intemperance and his doctrinal belief in Arminianism.

== Life ==
Commonly called "Dutch Thomson", he was born in Holland of English parents, and received his education at Clare Hall, where he graduated B.A. in 1587 and was elected fellow. He commenced M.A. in 1591, and was incorporated in that degree at Oxford on 1 July 1596. Bishop Lancelot Andrewes presented him to the rectory of Snailwell, Cambridgeshire.

He was selected as one of the translators of the Bible, being one of the company to which the task was allotted of translating the Old Testament from Genesis to the second book of Kings inclusive. Thomas Farnaby states that Thomson lived for some time under the protection of Sir Robert Killigrew, and that he was a great interpreter of Martial.

Henry Hickman styles him ‘the grand propagator of Arminianism,’ and Prynne describes him as ‘a debosh'd drunken English Dutchman, who seldom went one night to bed sober;’ but on the other hand Richard Montagu, who knew him well, says that he was ‘a most admirable philologer,’ and that ‘he was better known in Italy, France, and Germany than at home.’ He was buried at St Edward's, Cambridge, on 8 January 1613.

== Works ==
His works are:

- Elenchus Refutationis Pro … Episcopo Eliense adversus Martinum Becanum Jesuitam, authore Richardo Thomsonio Cantabrigiensi, London, 1611, dedicated to Sir Thomas Jermyn. Against Martinus Becanus and his attack on the Torturæ Torti, of Lancelot Andrewes, itself a controversial work against Robert Bellarmine in the allegiance oath controversy.
- Diatriba de Amissione et Intercisione Gratiæ et Justificationis, Leyden, 1616 and 1618. An ‘Animadversio brevis’ on this work was published in 1618 by Robert Abbot.
