= Lake Hayward (Wisconsin) =

- Location within Wisconsin
- Location: Sawyer County, Wisconsin
- Coordinates: 46.0072°N 91.4711°W
- Type: lake

Lake Hayward is in Sawyer County, Wisconsin, United States. It is fed by the Namekagon River and is part of the Saint Croix National Scenic Riverway.

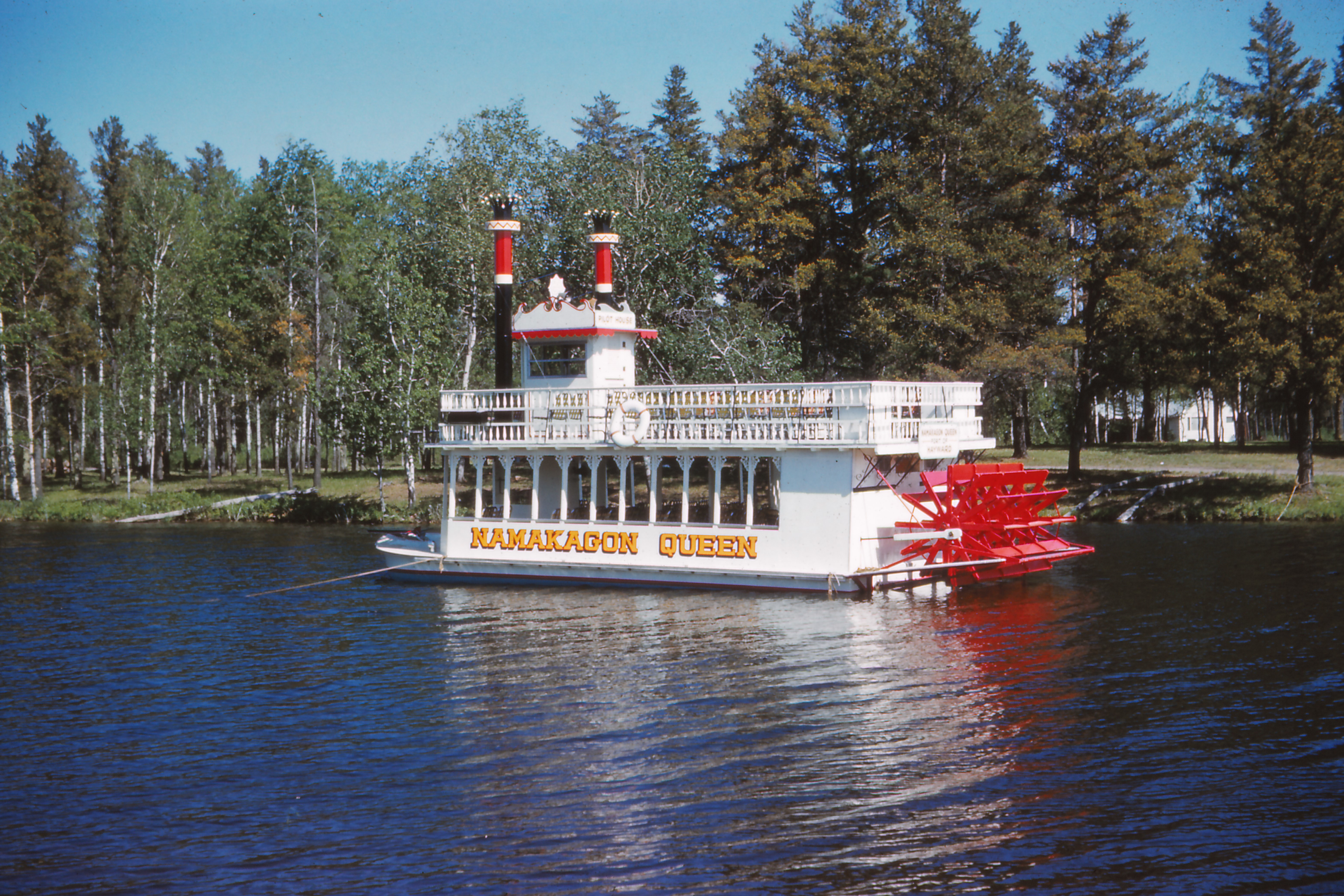
Namakagon Queen, Hayward, Wisconsin, June 1961

The Lumberjack Bowl is a large bay on Lake Hayward that is used for the Lumberjack World Championship.
