= Sawyer County Airport =

Airport in Wisconsin, United States

- IATA: HYR; ICAO: KHYR; FAA LID: HYR

Summary
- Airport type: Public
- Owner: Sawyer County
- Serves: Hayward, Wisconsin
- Time zone: CST (UTC−06:00)
  - Summer (DST): CDT (UTC−05:00)
- Elevation AMSL: 1,216 ft (371 m)
- Coordinates: 46°01′31″N 091°26′39″W
- Website: SawyerCountyGov.org/...

Map
- Location of airport in Wisconsin HYR (the United States)

Runways
Direction	Length		Surface
Direction	ft	m	Surface
3/21	5,002	1,525	Asphalt
16/34	1,088	332	Turf

Statistics
- Aircraft operations (2024): 11,600
- Based aircraft (2024): 25
- Source: Federal Aviation Administration

Sawyer County Airport (IATA: HYR, ICAO: KHYR, FAA LID: HYR) is a county-owned public-use airport in Sawyer County, Wisconsin, United States. It is located two nautical miles (4 km) northeast of the central business district of Hayward, Wisconsin. It is included in the Federal Aviation Administration (FAA) National Plan of Integrated Airport Systems for 2025–2029, in which it is categorized as a local general aviation facility. It was formerly known as Hayward Municipal Airport.

== Facilities and aircraft ==
Sawyer County Airport covers an area of 471 acres (191 ha) at an elevation of 1,216 feet (371 m) above mean sea level. It has two runways: 3/21 is 5,002 by 100 feet (1,525 x 30 m) with an asphalt surface and with approved ILS and GPS approaches; 16/34 is 1,088 by 120 feet (332 x 37 m) with a turf surface.

Hayward (HYR) VOR/DME, 113.4 MHz, is located on the field.

For the 12-month period ending June 20, 2024, the airport had 11,600 aircraft operations, an average of 32 per day: 82% general aviation, 17% air taxi and 1% military. In August 2024, there were 25 aircraft based at this airport: 20 single-engine, 1 multi-engine, 2 jet and 2 helicopter.

L & L Aviation is the fixed-base operator.

== See also ==
- List of airports in Wisconsin
