= Politics of Wisconsin =

Politics of a U.S. state

During the Civil War, Wisconsin was a Republican state; in fact, it is the state that gave birth to the Republican Party, although ethno-religious issues in the late 19th century caused a brief split in the coalition. The Bennett Law campaign of 1890 dealt with foreign language teaching in schools. Many Germans switched to the Democratic Party because of the Republican Party's support of the law.

Wisconsin's political history also encompasses, on the one hand, Robert La Follette and the Classical Progressive movement (La Folletteism), and on the other, the Republican and anti-Communist Joe McCarthy. From the early 20th century, the Socialist Party of America had a base in Milwaukee. The phenomenon was referred to as "sewer socialism" because the elected officials were more concerned with public works and reform than with revolution (although revolutionary socialism existed in the city as well). Its influence faded in the late 1950s largely because of the red scare and racial tensions. The first Socialist mayor of a large city in the United States was Emil Seidel, elected mayor of Milwaukee in 1910; another Socialist, Daniel Hoan, was mayor of Milwaukee from 1916 to 1940; and a third, Frank P. Zeidler, from 1948 to 1960. Succeeding Frank Zeidler, the last of Milwaukee's Socialist mayors, Henry Maier, a former Wisconsin State Senator and member of the Democratic Party was elected mayor of Milwaukee in 1960. Maier remained in office for 28 years, the longest-serving mayor in Milwaukee history. Socialist newspaper editor Victor Berger was repeatedly elected as a U.S. Representative, although he was prevented from serving for some time because of his opposition to the First World War.

Through the first half of the 20th century, Wisconsin's politics were dominated by Robert La Follette and his sons, originally of the Republican Party, but later of the revived Progressive Party and its successor Wisconsin Progressive Party - National Progressives. Since 1945, the state has maintained a close balance between Republicans and Democrats. Recent leading Republicans include former Governor Tommy Thompson and Congressman Jim Sensenbrenner; prominent Democrats include Senators Herb Kohl and Russ Feingold, the only Senator to vote against the Patriot Act in 2001, and Congressman David Obey.

Some have argued the state has experienced democratic backsliding since 2011. Some political scientists classify Wisconsin as a hybrid regime; the state's House of Representative and legislature elections are considered to be free but not fair, with districts undergoing "extreme partisan gerrymanders" to entrench Republicans "beyond electoral rotation".

== Federal elections ==
United States presidential election results for Wisconsin
Year	Republican / Whig		Democratic		Third party(ies)	
Year	No.	%	No.	%	No.	%
1848	13,747	35.10%	15,001	38.30%	10,418	26.60%
1852	22,210	34.34%	33,658	52.04%	8,814	13.63%
1856	66,090	55.30%	52,843	44.22%	579	0.48%
1860	86,113	56.59%	65,021	42.73%	1,049	0.69%
1864	83,458	55.88%	65,884	44.12%	0	0.00%
1868	108,900	56.25%	84,703	43.75%	0	0.00%
1872	104,994	54.60%	86,477	44.97%	834	0.43%
1876	130,067	50.57%	123,926	48.19%	3,184	1.24%
1880	144,398	54.04%	114,644	42.91%	8,145	3.05%
1884	161,135	50.38%	146,453	45.79%	12,247	3.83%
1888	176,553	49.79%	155,232	43.77%	22,829	6.44%
1892	171,101	46.05%	177,325	47.72%	23,155	6.23%
1896	268,135	59.93%	165,523	37.00%	13,751	3.07%
1900	265,760	60.06%	159,163	35.97%	17,578	3.97%
1904	280,315	63.21%	124,205	28.01%	38,921	8.78%
1908	247,747	54.52%	166,662	36.67%	40,032	8.81%
1912	130,596	32.65%	164,230	41.06%	105,149	26.29%
1916	220,822	49.39%	191,363	42.80%	34,949	7.82%
1920	498,576	71.10%	113,422	16.17%	89,282	12.73%
1924	311,614	37.06%	68,115	8.10%	461,097	54.84%
1928	544,205	53.52%	450,259	44.28%	22,367	2.20%
1932	347,741	31.19%	707,410	63.46%	59,657	5.35%
1936	380,828	30.26%	802,984	63.80%	74,748	5.94%
1940	679,206	48.32%	704,821	50.15%	21,495	1.53%
1944	674,532	50.37%	650,413	48.57%	14,207	1.06%
1948	590,959	46.28%	647,310	50.70%	38,531	3.02%
1952	979,744	60.95%	622,175	38.71%	5,451	0.34%
1956	954,844	61.58%	586,768	37.84%	8,946	0.58%
1960	895,175	51.77%	830,805	48.05%	3,102	0.18%
1964	638,495	37.74%	1,050,424	62.09%	2,896	0.17%
1968	809,997	47.89%	748,804	44.27%	132,737	7.85%
1972	989,430	53.40%	810,174	43.72%	53,286	2.88%
1976	1,004,987	47.83%	1,040,232	49.50%	56,117	2.67%
1980	1,088,845	47.90%	981,584	43.18%	202,792	8.92%
1984	1,198,800	54.19%	995,847	45.02%	17,369	0.79%
1988	1,047,499	47.80%	1,126,794	51.41%	17,315	0.79%
1992	930,855	36.78%	1,041,066	41.13%	559,193	22.09%
1996	845,029	38.48%	1,071,971	48.81%	279,169	12.71%
2000	1,237,279	47.61%	1,242,987	47.83%	118,341	4.55%
2004	1,478,120	49.32%	1,489,504	49.70%	29,383	0.98%
2008	1,262,393	42.31%	1,677,211	56.22%	43,813	1.47%
2012	1,407,966	45.89%	1,620,985	52.83%	39,483	1.29%
2016	1,405,284	47.22%	1,382,536	46.45%	188,330	6.33%
2020	1,610,184	48.82%	1,630,866	49.45%	56,991	1.73%
2024	1,697,626	49.60%	1,668,229	48.74%	57,063	1.67%

In 2020, Wisconsin leaned back in the Democratic party's direction as Joe Biden won the state by an even narrower margin of 0.63%. Biden's win was largely carried by Milwaukee and Dane counties with the rural areas of the state being carried by Trump.

Wisconsin has leaned Democratic in recent presidential elections, although Donald Trump managed to win the state in 2016 by a narrow margin of 0.77%. This marked the first time Wisconsin voted for a Republican presidential candidate since 1984, when every state except Minnesota and Washington D.C. went Republican. In 2012, Republican presidential candidate Mitt Romney chose Wisconsin Congressman Paul Ryan, a native of Janesville, as his running mate against incumbent Democratic President Barack Obama and Vice President Joe Biden. Obama nevertheless carried Wisconsin by a margin of 53% to 46%. Both the 2000 and 2004 presidential elections were quite close, with Wisconsin receiving heavy doses of national advertising, in accord with its status as a "swing", or pivot, state. Al Gore carried the presidential vote in 2000 by 5,700 votes, and John Kerry won Wisconsin in 2004 by 11,000 votes. Barack Obama carried the state in 2008 by 381,000 votes (56%).

Republicans had a stronghold in the Fox Valley, but elected a Democrat, Steve Kagen, of Appleton, for the 8th Congressional District in 2006. However, Kagen survived only two terms and was replaced by Republican Reid Ribble in the Republican Party's sweep of Wisconsin in November 2010, the first time the Republican Party had taken back both chambers of the state legislature and the governorship in the same election. The City of Milwaukee heads the list of Wisconsin's Democratic strongholds, which also includes Madison and the state's Native American reservations. Wisconsin's largest Congressional district, the 7th, had voted Democratic since 1969. Its representative, David Obey, chaired the powerful House Appropriations Committee. However, Obey retired and the once-Democratic seat was taken by Republican Sean Duffy in November 2010. The 2010 elections saw a huge Republican resurgence in Wisconsin. Republicans took control of the governor's office and both houses of the state legislature. Republican Ron Johnson defeated Democratic incumbent U.S. Senator Russ Feingold and Republicans took two previously Democratic-held House seats, creating a 5–3 Republican majority House delegation.

== State elections ==
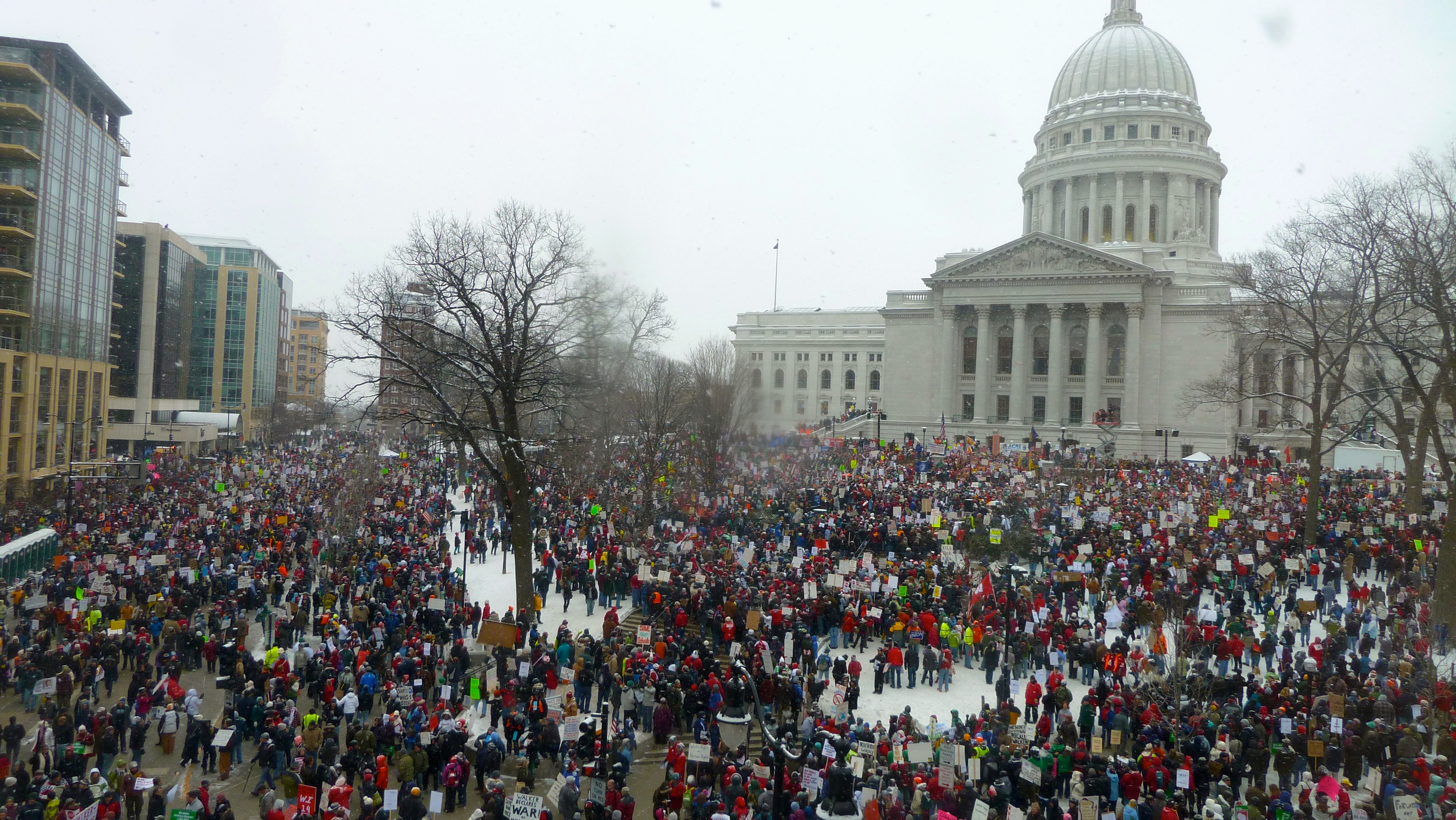
The 2011 Wisconsin Act 10 led to large protests around the state capitol building in Madison.

At the statewide level, Wisconsin is competitive, with control regularly alternating between the two parties. In 2006, Democrats gained in a national sweep of opposition to the Bush administration, and the Iraq War. The retiring GOP 8th District Congressman, Mark Green, of Green Bay, ran against the incumbent Governor Jim Doyle. Green lost by 8% statewide, making Doyle the first Democratic governor to be re-elected in 32 years. The Republicans lost control of the state Senate. Although Democrats gained eight seats in the state Assembly, Republicans retained a five-vote majority. In 2008, Democrats regained control of the State Assembly by a 52–46 margin, marking the first time since 1986 that the governor and state legislature were both Democratic.

With the election of Scott Walker in 2010, Republicans won both chambers of the legislature and the governorship, the first time all three changed partisan control in the same election. His first year in office saw the introduction of the 2011 Wisconsin Act 10, which removed collective bargaining rights for state employees. On February 14, 2011, the Wisconsin State Capitol erupted with protests when the Legislature took up a bill that would end most collective bargaining rights for state employees, except for wages, to address the $3.6 billion deficit. The protests attracted tens of thousands of people each day for months and garnered international attention. The Assembly passed the bill 53–42 on March 10 after the State Senate passed it the night before, and sent it to the Governor for his signature. In response to the bill, enough signatures were gathered to force a recall election against Governor Walker. Tom Barrett, the mayor of Milwaukee and Walker's 2010 opponent, won the Democratic primary and faced Walker again. Walker won the election by 53% to 46% and became the first governor in United States history to retain his seat after a recall election. Walker enacted other bills promoting conservative governance, such as a right-to-work law, abortion restrictions, and legislation removing certain gun controls.

Following the 2014 general election on November 4, 2014, the Governor, Lieutenant Governor, State Attorney General and State Treasurer were all Republicans, while the Secretary of State remained in the Democratic camp. However, Walker was defeated for a third term in 2018 by Democrat Tony Evers. Democratic U.S. Senator Tammy Baldwin was also elected to a second term and Democrats won all constitutional statewide offices on the ballot including Lieutenant Governor, Attorney General, Secretary of State, and State Treasurer, the first time this happened in Wisconsin since 1982. When Walker lost re-election in 2018, he collaborated with the Republican-held legislature to strip several powers from the incoming Governor and Attorney General.

== See also ==
- Political party strength in Wisconsin
- Recall elections in Wisconsin
- List of Wisconsin state legislatures
