= 1876 United States presidential election in Wisconsin =

- November 7, 1876
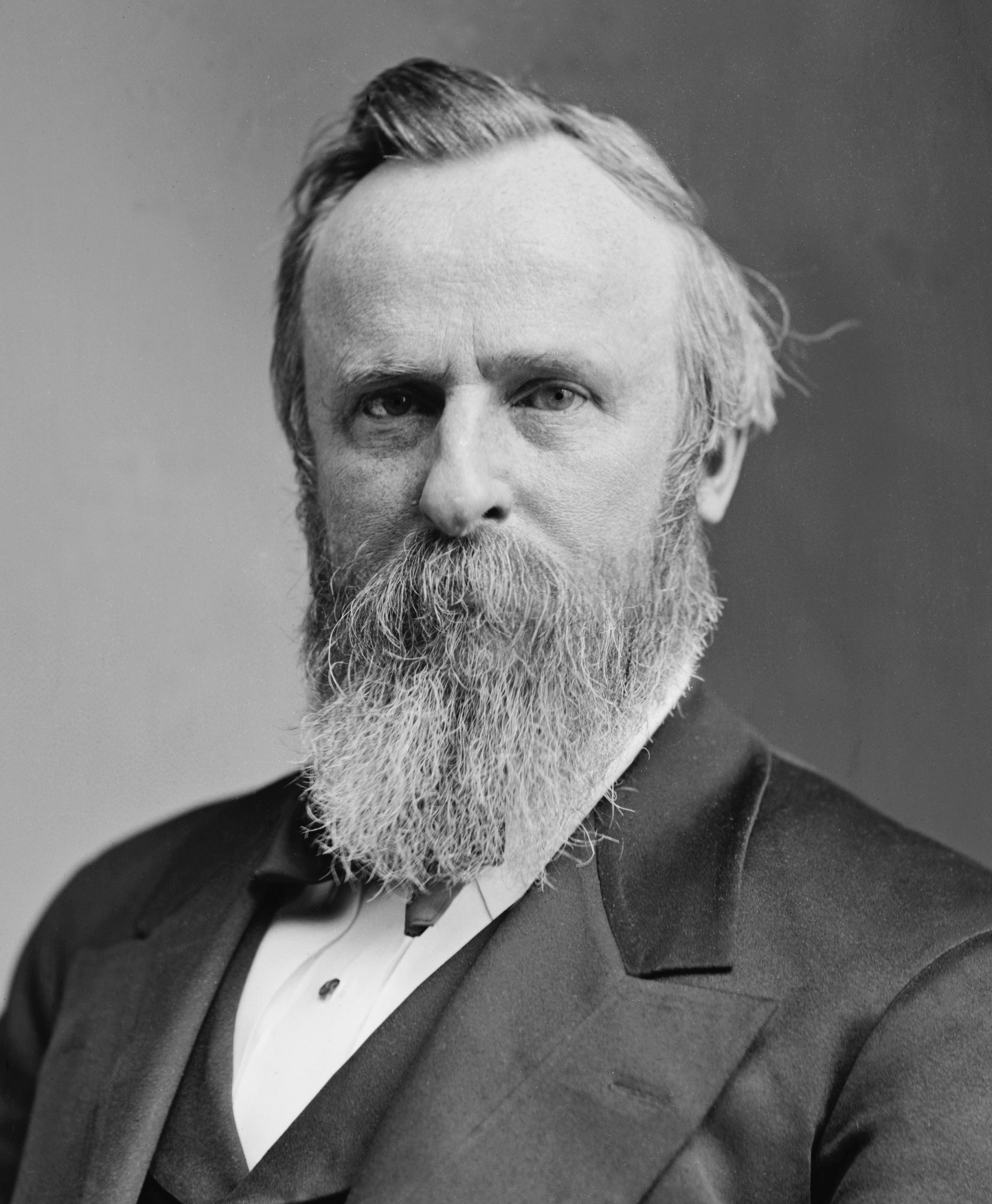

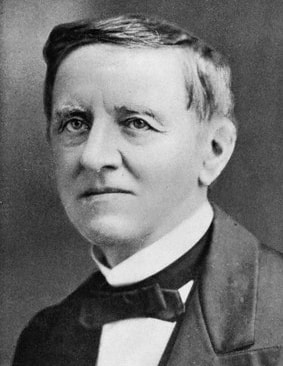
Nominee	Rutherford B. Hayes	Samuel J. Tilden
Party	Republican	Democratic
Home state	Ohio	New York
Running mate	William A. Wheeler	Thomas A. Hendricks
Electoral vote	10	0
Popular vote	130,070	123,930
Percentage	50.57%	48.19%
County results
Hayes
40–50%
50–60%
60–70%
70–80%
90–100%
Tilden
40–50%
50–60%
60–70%
70–80%
80–90%
President before election
Ulysses S. Grant
Republican
Elected President
Rutherford B. Hayes
Republican

The 1876 United States presidential election in Wisconsin was held on November 7, 1876, as part of the 1876 United States presidential election. State voters chose ten electors to the Electoral College, who voted for president and vice president.

Republican Party candidate Rutherford B. Hayes won Wisconsin with 50.57% of the popular vote, winning the state's ten electoral votes. Samuel J. Tilden's share of 48.19% was the largest for a Democrat in Wisconsin since Franklin Pierce won the state in 1852 and would remain so until Franklin D. Roosevelt's landslide victory in 1932. (Note: While both Grover Cleveland in 1892 and Woodrow Wilson in 1912 won Wisconsin, they did so with pluralities less than the share received by Tilden in 1876.)

Participating in its first election after its establishment in 1875, Taylor County voted for Tilden; this would be the only time until 1944 that Taylor County would not vote for the statewide winner.

== Results ==
General Election Results
Party	Pledged to	Elector	Votes
Republican Party	Rutherford B. Hayes	C. B. Solberg	130,070
Republican Party	Rutherford B. Hayes	J. H. Foster	130,068
Republican Party	Rutherford B. Hayes	John H. Knapp	130,066
Republican Party	Rutherford B. Hayes	C. M. Sanger	130,066
Republican Party	Rutherford B. Hayes	T. D. Lang	130,065
Republican Party	Rutherford B. Hayes	T. D. Weeks	130,065
Republican Party	Rutherford B. Hayes	Charles Luling	130,057
Republican Party	Rutherford B. Hayes	Francis Campbell	130,013
Republican Party	Rutherford B. Hayes	W. H. Hiner	129,815
Republican Party	Rutherford B. Hayes	Daniel L. Downs	125,168
Democratic Party	Samuel J. Tilden	S. A. White	123,930
Democratic Party	Samuel J. Tilden	W. W. Corning	123,929
Democratic Party	Samuel J. Tilden	John Black	123,926
Democratic Party	Samuel J. Tilden	John Lawler	123,926
Democratic Party	Samuel J. Tilden	W. E. Rowe	123,923
Democratic Party	Samuel J. Tilden	W. C. Silverthorn	123,922
Democratic Party	Samuel J. Tilden	Mons Anderson	123,920
Democratic Party	Samuel J. Tilden	Conrad Krez	123,913
Democratic Party	Samuel J. Tilden	Herman Naber	123,910
Democratic Party	Samuel J. Tilden	Samuel Ryan Jr.	123,883
Republican Party	Rutherford B. Hayes	J. H. Miner (Note: Appears to have replaced Daniel L. Downs on some Republican ballots)	4,886
Greenback Party	Peter Cooper	William Orledge	1,509
Greenback Party	Peter Cooper	George W. Lee	1,498
Greenback Party	Peter Cooper	Peter Houston	1,197
Greenback Party	Peter Cooper	E. H. Benton	1,196
Greenback Party	Peter Cooper	G. P. Martin	1,196
Greenback Party	Peter Cooper	T. P. Matthews	1,196
Greenback Party	Peter Cooper	James Montgomery	1,196
Greenback Party	Peter Cooper	S. S. Hills	1,195
Greenback Party	Peter Cooper	J. P. Kepler	1,195
Greenback Party	Peter Cooper	H. Greve	1,194
Greenback Party	Peter Cooper	George Esterly	153
Greenback Party	Peter Cooper	H. W. Remington	153
Greenback Party	Peter Cooper	E. P. Allis	151
Greenback Party	Peter Cooper	W. W. Field	151
Greenback Party	Peter Cooper	U. D. Mibill	151
Greenback Party	Peter Cooper	C. D. Parker	151
Greenback Party	Peter Cooper	E. C. Stilson	151
Greenback Party	Peter Cooper	E. S. Miner	142
Republican Party	Rutherford B. Hayes	W. H. Miner (Note: Appears to have been a misspelling of W. H. Hiner on some Republican ballots in Jefferson County)	136
Communist (Note: This is not the same as communist parties of the 20th century)		William Frankforth	32
Communist		C. Koegel	32
Communist		A. Owen	31
Communist		Edwin Peterslider	32
Communist		Carl Reinsweber	32
Communist		Herman Sanders	32
Communist		E. Schroeter	32
Communist		H. Smith	31
Communist		A. Voight	32
Communist		Frederick Voightlauder	32
Anti-Secret Society	James B. Walker	George Cowley	29
Anti-Secret Society	James B. Walker	S. A. Gilley	29
Anti-Secret Society	James B. Walker	William Hawlyn	29
Anti-Secret Society	James B. Walker	W. D. Lathrop	29
Anti-Secret Society	James B. Walker	C. R. Morrison	29
Anti-Secret Society	James B. Walker	J. Parish	29
Anti-Secret Society	James B. Walker	A. Shambaugh	29
Anti-Secret Society	James B. Walker	D. Varney	29
Anti-Secret Society	James B. Walker	J. Shaw	29
Anti-Secret Society	James B. Walker	W. W. Arnes	28
Prohibition Party	Green Clay Smith	H. H. G. Brandt	27
Prohibition Party	Green Clay Smith	A. B. Dodge	27
Prohibition Party	Green Clay Smith	D. N. Gilfillan	27
Prohibition Party	Green Clay Smith	William Goodell	27
Prohibition Party	Green Clay Smith	E. Prouty	27
Prohibition Party	Green Clay Smith	J. Smith	27
Prohibition Party	Green Clay Smith	E. W. Stevens	27
Prohibition Party	Green Clay Smith	William Swick	27
Prohibition Party	Green Clay Smith	Ephraim Wilcox	27
Prohibition Party	Green Clay Smith	J. N. Woodruff	27
Write-in		Scattering	1,587
Votes cast (Note: Based on totals for highest elector on each ticket)			257,184

=== Results by county ===
County	Rutherford B. Hayes Republican		Samuel J. Tilden Democratic		Peter Cooper Greenback		Other candidates (Note: These votes are Scattering unless otherwise noted) Various parties		Margin		Total votes cast (Note: Based on highest elector on each ticket)
County	#	%	#	%	#	%	#	%	#	%	Total votes cast
Adams	981	68.46%	442	30.84%	7	0.49%	3	0.21%	539	37.61%	1,433
Ashland	109	36.58%	189	63.42%	0	0.00%	0	0.00%	-80	-26.85%	298
Barron	644	71.48%	257	28.52%	0	0.00%	0	0.00%	387	42.95%	901
Bayfield	86	53.75%	74	46.25%	0	0.00%	0	0.00%	12	7.50%	160
Brown	2,705	42.59%	3,647	57.41%	0	0.00%	0	0.00%	-942	-14.83%	6,352
Buffalo	1,186	48.61%	1,162	47.62%	5	0.20%	87	3.57%	24	0.98%	2,440
Burnett	285	91.05%	28	8.95%	0	0.00%	0	0.00%	257	82.11%	313
Calumet	1,012	32.06%	2,145	67.94%	0	0.00%	0	0.00%	-1,133	-35.89%	3,157
Chippewa	1,595	47.34%	1,774	52.66%	0	0.00%	0	0.00%	-179	-5.31%	3,369
Clark	1,255	63.10%	660	33.18%	74	3.72%	0	0.00%	595	29.91%	1,989
Columbia	3,532	58.49%	2,493	41.28%	10	0.17%	4 (Note: 3 for Walker, 1 for Smith)	0.07%	1,039	17.20%	6,039
Crawford	1,355	45.79%	1,604	54.21%	0	0.00%	0	0.00%	-249	-8.42%	2,959
Dane	5,435	48.60%	5,726	51.21%	19	0.17%	2 (Note: 1 for Communist)	0.02%	-291	-2.60%	11,182
Dodge	3,282	33.57%	6,361	65.06%	4	0.04%	130	1.33%	-3,079	-31.49%	9,777
Door	1,095	64.60%	596	35.16%	3	0.18%	1	0.06%	499	29.44%	1,695
Douglas	46	40.71%	67	59.29%	0	0.00%	0	0.00%	-21	-18.58%	113
Dunn	2,033	68.24%	894	30.01%	39	1.31%	13	0.44%	1,139	38.23%	2,979
Eau Claire	2,266	55.63%	1,785	43.83%	22	0.54%	0	0.00%	481	11.81%	4,073
Fond du Lac	4,845	45.83%	5,660	53.54%	0	0.00%	67	0.63%	-815	-7.71%	10,572
Grant	4,723	59.33%	3,198	40.17%	30	0.38%	10	0.13%	1,525	19.16%	7,961
Green	2,601	48.81%	1,735	32.56%	123	2.31%	870	16.33%	866	16.25%	5,329
Green Lake	1,739	53.46%	1,514	46.54%	0	0.00%	0	0.00%	225	6.92%	3,253
Iowa	2,651	52.86%	2,348	46.82%	16	0.32%	0	0.00%	303	6.04%	5,015
Jackson	1,507	66.15%	718	31.52%	53	2.33%	0	0.00%	789	34.64%	2,278
Jefferson	2,874	40.99%	4,134	58.96%	0	0.00%	3	0.04%	-1,260	-17.97%	7,011
Juneau	1,714	53.68%	1,458	45.66%	20	0.63%	1 (Note: 1 for Smith)	0.03%	256	8.02%	3,193
Kenosha	1,612	52.94%	1,431	47.00%	1	0.03%	1	0.03%	181	5.94%	3,045
Kewaunee	561	25.33%	1,654	74.67%	0	0.00%	0	0.00%	-1,093	-49.35%	2,215
La Crosse	2,644	51.09%	2,481	47.94%	34	0.66%	16 (Note: 15 for Communist)	0.31%	163	3.15%	5,175
Lafayette	2,424	50.89%	2,299	48.27%	10	0.21%	30	0.63%	125	2.62%	4,763
Lincoln	71	22.47%	174	55.06%	71	22.47%	0	0.00%	-103	-32.59%	316
Manitowoc	2,700	40.80%	3,908	59.05%	0	0.00%	10	0.15%	-1,208	-18.25%	6,618
Marathon	668	26.83%	1,796	72.13%	22	0.88%	4	0.16%	-1,128	-45.30%	2,490
Marquette	695	38.46%	1,112	61.54%	0	0.00%	0	0.00%	-417	-23.08%	1,807
Milwaukee	10,002	45.25%	12,025	54.40%	6	0.03%	72	0.33%	-2,023	-9.15%	22,105
Monroe	2,258	49.33%	2,030	44.35%	289	6.31%	0	0.00%	228	4.98%	4,577
Oconto	1,813	60.49%	1,174	39.17%	0	0.00%	10	0.33%	639	21.32%	2,997
Outagamie	1,859	33.77%	3,608	65.54%	38	0.69%	0	0.00%	-1,749	-31.77%	5,505
Ozaukee	583	18.95%	2,480	80.60%	13	0.42%	1	0.03%	-1,897	-61.65%	3,077
Pepin	836	67.64%	394	31.88%	6	0.49%	0	0.00%	442	35.76%	1,236
Pierce	2,135	67.33%	985	31.06%	19	0.60%	32	1.01%	1,150	36.27%	3,171
Polk	1,019	72.94%	362	25.91%	16	1.15%	0	0.00%	657	47.03%	1,397
Portage	1,855	50.78%	1,794	49.11%	3	0.08%	1	0.03%	61	1.67%	3,653
Racine	3,560	55.28%	2,880	44.72%	0	0.00%	0	0.00%	680	10.56%	6,440
Richland	2,037	52.99%	1,591	41.39%	46	1.20%	170	4.42%	446	11.60%	3,844
Rock	5,707	66.46%	2,814	32.77%	63	0.73%	3	0.03%	2,893	33.69%	8,587
Sauk	3,395	60.45%	2,201	39.19%	0	0.00%	20 (Note: 16 for Communist, 4 for Walker)	0.36%	1,194	21.26%	5,616
Shawano	582	40.00%	873	60.00%	0	0.00%	0	0.00%	-291	-20.00%	1,455
Sheboygan	3,224	46.77%	3,643	52.84%	19	0.28%	8	0.12%	-419	-6.08%	6,894
St. Croix	1,775	49.79%	1,736	48.70%	54	1.51%	0	0.00%	39	1.09%	3,565
Taylor	240	49.38%	246	50.62%	0	0.00%	0	0.00%	-6	-1.23%	486
Trempealeau	2,360	73.00%	790	24.44%	58	1.79%	25 (Note: 25 for Smith)	0.77%	1,570	48.56%	3,233
Vernon	2,765	69.26%	1,117	27.98%	110	2.76%	0	0.00%	1,648	41.28%	3,992
Walworth	4,212	67.88%	1,970	31.75%	2	0.03%	21 (Note: 21 for Walker)	0.34%	2,242	36.13%	6,205
Washington	1,321	29.72%	3,047	68.55%	41	0.92%	36	0.81%	-1,726	-38.83%	4,445
Waukesha	3,129	48.27%	3,335	51.45%	17	0.26%	1 (Note: 1 for Walker)	0.02%	-206	-3.18%	6,482
Waupaca	2,642	62.27%	1,592	37.52%	9	0.21%	0	0.00%	1,050	24.75%	4,243
Waushara	2,080	78.55%	548	20.69%	10	0.38%	10	0.38%	1,532	57.85%	2,648
Winnebago	5,091	53.21%	4,426	46.26%	38	0.40%	13	0.14%	665	6.95%	9,568
Wood	659	44.14%	745	49.90%	89	5.96%	0	0.00%	-86	-5.76%	1,493
Total	130,070	50.57%	123,930	48.19%	1,509	0.59%	1,675	0.65%	6,140	2.39%	257,184

==== Counties that flipped from Liberal Republican to Republican ====
- Buffalo

==== Counties that flipped from Republican to Democratic ====
- Ashland
- Brown
- Chippewa
- Crawford
- Dane
- Wood

== See also ==
- United States presidential elections in Wisconsin
