= 1924 United States presidential election in Wisconsin =

- November 4, 1924

Nominee	Robert M. La Follette	Calvin Coolidge	John W. Davis
Party	Progressive	Republican	Democratic
Home state	Wisconsin	Massachusetts	West Virginia
Running mate	Burton K. Wheeler	Charles G. Dawes	Charles W. Bryan
Electoral vote	13	0	0
Popular vote	453,678	311,614	68,115
Percentage	53.96%	37.06%	8.10%
County results
La Follette
40–50%
50–60%
60–70%
70–80%
Coolidge
40–50%
50–60%
60–70%
President before election
Calvin Coolidge
Republican
Elected President
Calvin Coolidge
Republican

The 1924 United States presidential election in Wisconsin was held on November 4, 1924, as part of the 1924 United States presidential election. State voters chose 13 electors to the Electoral College, who voted for president and vice president. Wisconsin had since the decline of the Populist movement been substantially a one-party state dominated by the Republican Party. The Democratic Party became entirely uncompetitive outside certain German Catholic counties adjoining Lake Michigan as the upper classes, along with the majority of workers who followed them, completely fled from William Jennings Bryan's agrarian and free silver sympathies. As Democratic strength weakened severely after 1894 – although the state did develop a strong Socialist Party to provide opposition to the GOP – Wisconsin developed the direct Republican primary in 1903 and this ultimately created competition between the "League" under Robert M. La Follette, and the conservative "Regular" faction.

The beginning of the 1910s would see a minor Democratic revival as many La Follette progressives endorsed Woodrow Wilson, but this flirtation would not be long-lasting as Wilson's "Anglophile" foreign policies were severely opposed by Wisconsin's largely German- and Scandinavian-American populace. The 1918 mid-term elections saw the Midwestern farming community largely desert the Democratic Party due to supposed preferential treatment of Southern farmers: Democratic seats in the Midwest fell from thirty-four to seventeen, and in 1920 Wisconsin's status as a one-party Republican state was solidified as James M. Cox won less than a sixth of the state's presidential vote and Democrats claimed only four state legislative seats, all but one of which would be lost in 1922.

At the same time, the Republican Party both at the state and national levels was severely divided between an ascendant conservative faction and a progressive faction, whose leader was Wisconsin's own veteran senator Robert M. La Follette. After a fierce debate the Democratic Party nominated former Congressman John W. Davis of West Virginia, who although West Virginia was a border state whose limited African-American population had not been disenfranchised as happened in all former Confederate States, shared the extreme social conservatism of Southern Democrats of the time. Davis supported poll taxes, opposed women's suffrage, and believed in strictly limited government with no expansion in nonmilitary fields.

The conservatism of the major-party nominees made La Follette mount a third-party challenge, which he had planned even beforehand. Wisconsin's Senator was formally nominated on July 4 by the "Conference for Progressive Political Action" and developed a platform dedicated to eliminating child labor and American interference in Latin American political affairs, along with a formal denunciation of the Ku Klux Klan. La Follette also proposed major judicial reforms including amendments allowing Congress to override judicial review and to re-enact laws declared unconstitutional. La Follette also called for election of federal judges for ten-year terms.

At the beginning of the campaign in July, La Follette listed nine states as "in" for him, including Wisconsin. Although early opinion polls showed La Follette attracting large numbers of those German and Scandinavian-Americans who completely deserted Cox in 1920, newer polls later in the fall showed Wisconsin as the only state La Follette was certain to carry. These later polls proved correct, with La Follette carrying Wisconsin with 53.96 percent of the popular vote, but winning no other state.

== Results ==
General Election Results
Party	Pledged to	Elector	Votes
Independent Progressive (Note: La Follette was listed as Independent Progressive in Wisconsin)	Robert M. La Follette	Zona Gale	453,678
Independent Progressive	Robert M. La Follette	Otto P. Seifriz	446,289
Independent Progressive	Robert M. La Follette	Julia Anderson Schnetz	444,915
Independent Progressive	Robert M. La Follette	Charles J. Schoenfeld	444,848
Independent Progressive	Robert M. La Follette	William T. Evjue	444,514
Independent Progressive	Robert M. La Follette	John J. Handley	444,062
Independent Progressive	Robert M. La Follette	Ira S. Lorenz	444,004
Independent Progressive	Robert M. La Follette	John C. Schmidtmann	443,862
Independent Progressive	Robert M. La Follette	William V. Kidder	443,784
Independent Progressive	Robert M. La Follette	Ernest L. Schroeder	443,726
Independent Progressive	Robert M. La Follette	John T. Reynolds	443,459
Independent Progressive	Robert M. La Follette	Mary Francis Taylor	443,224
Independent Progressive	Robert M. La Follette	Clough Gates	443,073
Republican Party	Calvin Coolidge	Emanuel L. Phillipp	311,614
Republican Party	Calvin Coolidge	Magnus Swenson	310,550
Republican Party	Calvin Coolidge	F. Lee Norton	310,538
Republican Party	Calvin Coolidge	Lyman G. Wheeler	310,455
Republican Party	Calvin Coolidge	Theodora W. Youmans	310,388
Republican Party	Calvin Coolidge	Wheeler P. Bloodgood	310,330
Republican Party	Calvin Coolidge	Theodore Benfey	310,306
Republican Party	Calvin Coolidge	Timothy Burke	310,085
Republican Party	Calvin Coolidge	J. L. Sturtevant	310,019
Republican Party	Calvin Coolidge	George S. Gordon Sr.	309,930
Republican Party	Calvin Coolidge	Sophie I. Strathern	309,923
Republican Party	Calvin Coolidge	Laura Olson	309,824
Republican Party	Calvin Coolidge	Mary Scott Johnson	309,654
Democratic Party	John W. Davis	Anthony Szczerbinski	68,115
Democratic Party	John W. Davis	Katherine L. Conway	68,096
Democratic Party	John W. Davis	John F. Doherty	68,040
Democratic Party	John W. Davis	John Moran	68,028
Democratic Party	John W. Davis	Charles E. Wilson	68,025
Democratic Party	John W. Davis	William H. Graebner	68,011
Democratic Party	John W. Davis	Carl J. Mueller	67,958
Democratic Party	John W. Davis	John Mulva	67,840
Democratic Party	John W. Davis	H. B. Crane	67,837
Democratic Party	John W. Davis	Francis J. Rooney	67,815
Democratic Party	John W. Davis	Henry L. Nunn	67,775
Democratic Party	John W. Davis	George F. Dietrich	67,772
Democratic Party	John W. Davis	Ludwig P. Moen	67,751
Independent (Note: Foster was listed as Independent Workers in Wisconsin)	William Z. Foster	Henry Hill	3,773
Independent	William Z. Foster	Martin Udjbinac	3,759
Independent	William Z. Foster	Arvid Nelson	3,739
Independent	William Z. Foster	A. J. Haynes	3,728
Independent	William Z. Foster	Aaron Kivisto	3,724
Independent	William Z. Foster	Louis Majtan	3,715
Independent	William Z. Foster	Martin Markovich	3,710
Independent	William Z. Foster	Carl Gerlach	3,708
Independent	William Z. Foster	Marko Ebenhe	3,687
Independent	William Z. Foster	Clara Knappe	3,681
Independent	William Z. Foster	Carl Schradl	3,666
Independent	William Z. Foster	Fred Podello	3,659
Independent	William Z. Foster	Fredinand Pilacek	3,628
Prohibition Party	Herman P. Faris	Helen M. Tubbs	2,918
Prohibition Party	Herman P. Faris	William E. Mack	2,845
Prohibition Party	Herman P. Faris	M. L. Welles	2,839
Prohibition Party	Herman P. Faris	Alba A. Glovier	2,831
Prohibition Party	Herman P. Faris	Ella Tenney Sanford	2,824
Prohibition Party	Herman P. Faris	Charles H. Mott	2,818
Prohibition Party	Herman P. Faris	Herbert S. Siggelko	2,811
Prohibition Party	Herman P. Faris	August F. Fehlandt	2,809
Prohibition Party	Herman P. Faris	Lucius A. Willis	2,809
Prohibition Party	Herman P. Faris	Peter H. Rasmussen	2,802
Prohibition Party	Herman P. Faris	Frank Elisha Cummings	2,795
Prohibition Party	Herman P. Faris	D. Belle Ady	2,790
Prohibition Party	Herman P. Faris	David Walden Emerson	2,768
Independent (Note: Johns was listed as Independent Socialist Labor in Wisconsin. The Socialist Labor Party ran only four electors on its Wisconsin ticket.)	Frank T. Johns	Jeff Davies	458
Independent	Frank T. Johns	G. Driebel	411
Independent	Frank T. Johns	E. Kathke Jr.	379
Independent	Frank T. Johns	M. Farchmin Jr.	376
Independent (Note: Wallace was listed as Independent Commonwealth Land in Wisconsin. The Commonwealth Land Party ran only two electors on its Wisconsin ticket.)	William J. Wallace	Carl Aken	270
Independent	William J. Wallace	Cornelius Leenhouts	215
Write-in		Scattering (Note: Not listed in the 1925 Blue Book)	10
Votes cast (Note: Based on totals for highest elector on each ticket)			840,836

=== Results by county ===
County	Robert M. La Follette Progressive		Calvin Coolidge Republican		John W. Davis Democratic		Other candidates Various parties		Margin (Note: Because La Follette carried Wisconsin, and Coolidge was the top major party candidate in the state and in every county, all margins given are La Follette vote minus Coolidge vote and all percentage margins La Follette percentage minus Coolidge percentage.)		Total votes cast (Note: Based on highest elector on each ticket)
County	#	%	#	%	#	%	#	%	#	%	Total votes cast
Adams	1,724	64.16%	779	28.99%	173	6.44%	11	0.41%	945	35.17%	2,687
Ashland	4,204	60.02%	2,272	32.44%	449	6.41%	79	1.13%	1,932	27.58%	7,004
Barron	6,010	65.47%	2,703	29.44%	377	4.11%	90	0.98%	3,307	36.02%	9,180
Bayfield	2,601	56.54%	1,675	36.41%	205	4.46%	119	2.59%	926	20.13%	4,600
Brown	10,024	49.92%	7,611	37.90%	2,328	11.59%	117	0.58%	2,413	12.02%	20,080
Buffalo	2,474	61.76%	1,324	33.05%	176	4.39%	32	0.80%	1,150	28.71%	4,006
Burnett	2,088	66.12%	958	30.34%	76	2.41%	36	1.14%	1,130	35.78%	3,158
Calumet	3,503	69.42%	938	18.59%	569	11.28%	36	0.71%	2,565	50.83%	5,046
Chippewa	6,517	52.95%	5,135	41.72%	560	4.55%	96	0.78%	1,382	11.23%	12,308
Clark	6,208	62.02%	3,130	31.27%	552	5.51%	120	1.20%	3,078	30.75%	10,010
Columbia	5,968	51.05%	4,724	40.41%	907	7.76%	91	0.78%	1,244	10.64%	11,690
Crawford	2,977	52.58%	1,687	29.80%	936	16.53%	62	1.10%	1,290	22.78%	5,662
Dane	24,595	62.73%	12,280	31.32%	2,081	5.31%	252	0.64%	12,315	31.41%	39,208
Dodge	9,610	56.63%	5,167	30.45%	2,019	11.90%	175	1.03%	4,443	26.18%	16,971
Door	2,715	55.36%	1,891	38.56%	235	4.79%	63	1.28%	824	16.80%	4,904
Douglas	8,255	54.89%	5,887	39.14%	638	4.24%	259	1.72%	2,368	15.75%	15,039
Dunn	4,385	55.39%	3,177	40.13%	284	3.59%	70	0.88%	1,208	15.26%	7,916
Eau Claire	5,222	47.12%	5,149	46.46%	629	5.68%	83	0.75%	73	0.66%	11,083
Florence	523	44.21%	594	50.21%	49	4.14%	17	1.44%	-71	-6.00%	1,183
Fond du Lac	9,576	46.80%	8,516	41.62%	2,222	10.86%	146	0.71%	1,060	5.18%	20,460
Forest	1,259	46.46%	1,104	40.74%	299	11.03%	48	1.77%	155	5.72%	2,710
Grant	6,825	48.17%	5,714	40.33%	1,518	10.71%	112	0.79%	1,111	7.84%	14,169
Green	4,885	58.64%	2,922	35.07%	423	5.08%	101	1.21%	1,963	23.56%	8,331
Green Lake	2,187	41.19%	1,988	37.45%	1,090	20.53%	44	0.83%	199	3.75%	5,309
Iowa	4,133	50.32%	3,291	40.07%	689	8.39%	100	1.22%	842	10.25%	8,213
Iron	1,400	53.15%	1,058	40.17%	84	3.19%	92	3.49%	342	12.98%	2,634
Jackson	3,167	61.44%	1,662	32.24%	255	4.95%	71	1.38%	1,505	29.19%	5,155
Jefferson	7,885	57.93%	4,250	31.22%	1,374	10.09%	102	0.75%	3,635	26.71%	13,611
Juneau	3,785	61.40%	1,917	31.10%	403	6.54%	59	0.96%	1,868	30.30%	6,164
Kenosha	6,695	35.90%	10,341	55.45%	1,517	8.13%	96	0.51%	-3,646	-19.55%	18,649
Kewaunee	2,804	65.82%	1,018	23.90%	395	9.27%	43	1.01%	1,786	41.92%	4,260
La Crosse	10,543	59.74%	5,733	32.49%	1,252	7.09%	119	0.67%	4,810	27.26%	17,647
Lafayette	3,681	47.81%	2,671	34.69%	1,265	16.43%	82	1.07%	1,010	13.12%	7,699
Langlade	3,578	50.05%	2,572	35.98%	926	12.95%	73	1.02%	1,006	14.07%	7,149
Lincoln	4,465	64.54%	1,857	26.84%	503	7.27%	93	1.34%	2,608	37.70%	6,918
Manitowoc	9,814	60.04%	4,828	29.54%	1,599	9.78%	104	0.64%	4,986	30.50%	16,345
Marathon	12,193	63.88%	5,577	29.22%	1,109	5.81%	209	1.09%	6,616	34.66%	19,088
Marinette	3,411	37.98%	4,911	54.68%	571	6.36%	88	0.98%	-1,500	-16.70%	8,981
Marquette	1,820	51.18%	1,109	31.19%	587	16.51%	40	1.12%	711	19.99%	3,556
Milwaukee	81,697	55.19%	50,730	34.27%	14,510	9.80%	1,092	0.74%	30,967	20.92%	148,029
Monroe	6,747	67.71%	2,661	26.70%	428	4.30%	129	1.29%	4,086	41.00%	9,965
Oconto	4,506	58.25%	2,562	33.12%	602	7.78%	65	0.84%	1,944	25.13%	7,735
Oneida	3,196	59.74%	1,769	33.07%	324	6.06%	61	1.14%	1,427	26.67%	5,350
Outagamie	10,357	57.03%	6,426	35.39%	1,255	6.91%	122	0.67%	3,931	21.65%	18,160
Ozaukee	3,264	66.61%	1,015	20.71%	592	12.08%	29	0.59%	2,249	45.90%	4,900
Pepin	737	33.59%	1,226	55.88%	206	9.39%	25	1.14%	-489	-22.29%	2,194
Pierce	3,661	53.80%	2,788	40.97%	298	4.38%	58	0.85%	873	12.83%	6,805
Polk	4,251	57.18%	2,793	37.57%	317	4.26%	73	0.98%	1,458	19.61%	7,434
Portage	5,347	52.01%	2,854	27.76%	2,010	19.55%	69	0.67%	2,493	24.25%	10,280
Price	3,151	58.94%	1,754	32.81%	323	6.04%	118	2.21%	1,397	26.13%	5,346
Racine	11,298	43.51%	13,040	50.21%	1,463	5.63%	168	0.65%	-1,742	-6.71%	25,969
Richland	2,660	41.97%	2,669	42.11%	898	14.17%	111	1.75%	-9	-0.14%	6,338
Rock	7,923	32.58%	14,815	60.92%	1,453	5.97%	129	0.53%	-6,892	-28.34%	24,320
Rusk	2,677	54.19%	1,932	39.11%	272	5.51%	59	1.19%	745	15.08%	4,940
Sauk	6,400	57.91%	3,935	35.60%	555	5.02%	162	1.47%	2,465	22.30%	11,052
Sawyer	1,487	56.37%	990	37.53%	135	5.12%	26	0.99%	497	18.84%	2,638
Shawano	6,337	70.69%	2,063	23.01%	471	5.25%	94	1.05%	4,274	47.67%	8,965
Sheboygan	11,714	58.04%	6,974	34.56%	1,350	6.69%	143	0.71%	4,740	23.49%	20,181
St. Croix	4,693	51.72%	3,600	39.68%	718	7.91%	62	0.68%	1,093	12.05%	9,073
Taylor	3,079	65.37%	1,389	29.49%	185	3.93%	57	1.21%	1,690	35.88%	4,710
Trempealeau	4,148	62.24%	2,083	31.26%	373	5.60%	60	0.90%	2,065	30.99%	6,664
Vernon	5,599	63.78%	2,670	30.41%	406	4.62%	104	1.18%	2,929	33.36%	8,779
Vilas	1,038	50.07%	873	42.11%	119	5.74%	43	2.07%	165	7.96%	2,073
Walworth	4,335	33.13%	7,484	57.19%	1,162	8.88%	105	0.80%	-3,149	-24.06%	13,086
Washburn	2,043	55.90%	1,422	38.91%	158	4.32%	32	0.88%	621	16.99%	3,655
Washington	5,081	62.49%	1,987	24.44%	980	12.05%	83	1.02%	3,094	38.05%	8,131
Waukesha	6,348	41.06%	7,026	45.45%	1,965	12.71%	120	0.78%	-678	-4.39%	15,459
Waupaca	6,395	59.32%	3,654	33.89%	665	6.17%	67	0.62%	2,741	25.42%	10,781
Waushara	2,606	57.63%	1,602	35.43%	249	5.51%	65	1.44%	1,004	22.20%	4,522
Winnebago	9,891	42.86%	11,239	48.70%	1,801	7.80%	146 (Note: The 1925 Blue Book contains a typo for Commonwealth Land elector Aken. The correct figure for Aken is 2, not 3; using 3 causes the county figures to not add up to the statewide total.)	0.63%	-1,348	-5.84%	23,077
Wood	7,303	63.83%	3,469	30.32%	548	4.79%	122	1.07%	3,834	33.51%	11,442
Totals	453,678	53.96%	311,614	37.06%	68,115	8.10%	7,429	0.88%	142,064	16.90%	840,836

==== Counties that flipped from Republican to Progressive ====
- Adams
- Ashland
- Barron
- Bayfield
- Brown
- Buffalo
- Burnett
- Calumet
- Chippewa
- Clark
- Columbia
- Crawford
- Dane
- Dodge
- Door
- Douglas
- Dunn
- Eau Claire
- Fond du Lac
- Forest
- Grant
- Green
- Green Lake
- Iowa
- Iron
- Jackson
- Jefferson
- Juneau
- Kewaunee
- La Crosse
- Lafayette
- Langlade
- Lincoln
- Manitowoc
- Marathon
- Marquette
- Milwaukee
- Monroe
- Oconto
- Oneida
- Outagamie
- Ozaukee
- Pierce
- Polk
- Portage
- Price
- Rusk
- Sauk
- Sawyer
- Shawano
- Sheboygan
- St. Croix
- Taylor
- Trempealeau
- Vernon
- Vilas
- Washburn
- Washington
- Waupaca
- Waushara
- Wood

== Analysis ==
La Follette carried 62 of Wisconsin's 72 counties, with Coolidge gaining majorities only in the heavily Yankee and pro-establishment counties bordering Illinois, in Pepin County on the western border, and in Marinette and Florence Counties bordering Michigan. As of the 2024 presidential election, this is the last time a third-party presidential candidate has carried a state outside the former Confederacy. (Note: Due to conflicts over black civil rights and to their disenfranchisement, third-party "states' rights" candidates carried four Confederate states in 1948, two in 1960 and five in 1968.) This was the first presidential election in which a Republican won the White House without carrying Wisconsin, a feat which would only occur 3 more times (in 1988, 2000, and 2004).

Two very long bellwether streaks for Wisconsin counties were broken in this election. Winnebago County failed to back the statewide winner for the first time since 1848, which was the first presidential election that the state participated in. Kenosha County also failed to back the statewide winner for the first time since 1852, which was the first presidential election that the county had participated in. This was the last election in Wisconsin in which voters chose presidential electors directly. The state switched to the modern "short ballot" starting with the next election.

== See also ==
- United States presidential elections in Wisconsin
