= 1892 United States presidential election in Wisconsin =

- November 8, 1892

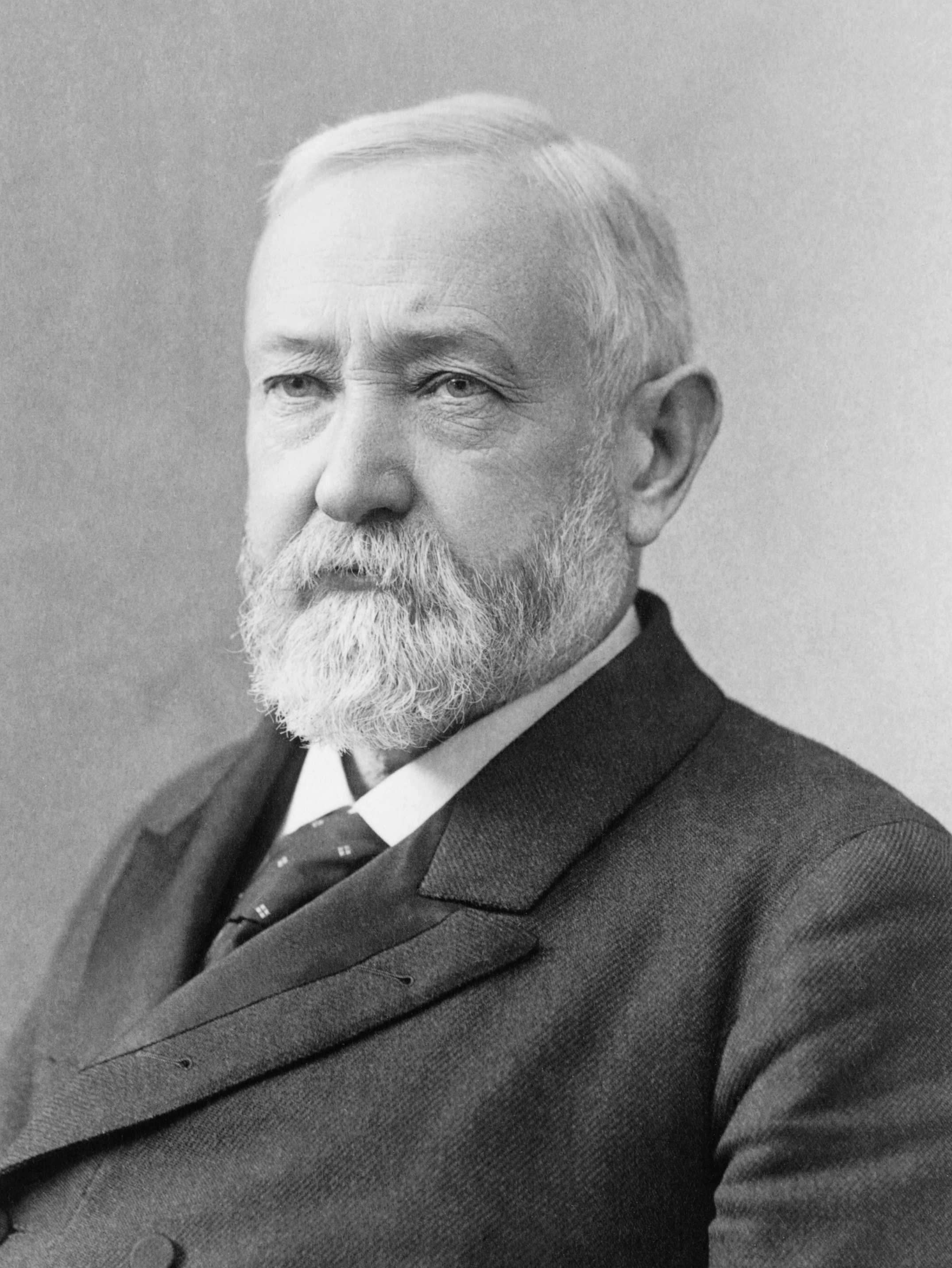
Nominee	Grover Cleveland	Benjamin Harrison
Party	Democratic	Republican
Home state	New York	Indiana
Running mate	Adlai Stevenson I	Whitelaw Reid
Electoral vote	12	0
Popular vote	177,335	170,846
Percentage	47.75%	46.01%
County results
Cleveland
40–50%
50–60%
60–70%
70–80%
Harrison
40–50%
50–60%
60–70%
President before election
Benjamin Harrison
Republican
Elected President
Grover Cleveland
Democratic

The 1892 United States presidential election in Wisconsin was held on November 8, 1892, as part of the 1892 United States presidential election. State voters chose 12 electors to the Electoral College, who voted for president and vice president.

Former president Grover Cleveland, the Democratic Party candidate, won Wisconsin against sitting Republican president Benjamin Harrison with 47.75% of the popular vote, winning the state's twelve electoral votes. This was the closest presidential election in Wisconsin to that point, which distinction it held until it voted narrowly for Jimmy Carter over Gerald Ford in 1976.

As a result of his win, Cleveland became the first Democratic presidential candidate since Franklin Pierce in 1852 to win Wisconsin. No Democrat would win Wisconsin again until Woodrow Wilson in 1912. This marked the first occasion in which Wisconsin voted for a different candidate than Iowa, a phenomenon that has only occurred five more times since — 1924, 1940, 1976, 2004, and 2020. Wisconsin is one of the three states that voted Republican in both 1884 and 1888 but flipped to Cleveland in 1892, the others being California and Illinois.

Cleveland was the first Democrat ever to win Forest County, Green Lake County, Juneau County, Kenosha County, Marinette County, and Oconto County. He was also the first Democrat since Pierce in 1852 to carry La Crosse County, Portage County, and Winnebago County. Many of the counties that Cleveland won in this election would not vote Democratic again until Wilson carried them in 1912. However, Juneau County, Marinette County, Oconto County, and Oneida County would not vote for a Democrat again until Franklin D. Roosevelt in 1932.

This was the first of only three elections in which Adams County has backed the statewide loser. (Note: The other two are 1912 and 2020. All three elections saw a Democrat winning the state but a Republican carrying Adams County.) After this election, Portage County remained the only original county from statehood to have backed the winner in every election, a streak that would last until 1916.

== Results ==
General Election Results (Note: The 1893 Blue Book gives the totals as Cleveland 177,325; Harrison 171,101; Bidwell 13,136; Weaver 10,019; and no Scattering. Based on the Board of Canvassers report, these totals are simply incorrect; no elector on any ticket received those numbers of votes. Indeed, the Blue Book is an unreliable source for Wisconsin election data from about 1890 to 1920 and its figures frequently differ from the figures listed in the Board of Canvassers reports.)
Party	Pledged to	Elector	Votes
Democratic Party	Grover Cleveland	Gustav Wollaeger	177,335
Democratic Party	Grover Cleveland	Robert J. MacBride	177,314
Democratic Party	Grover Cleveland	Andrew Jensen	177,307
Democratic Party	Grover Cleveland	Henry B. Schwin	177,293
Democratic Party	Grover Cleveland	Ferdinand T. Yahr	177,291
Democratic Party	Grover Cleveland	Michael Johnson	177,283
Democratic Party	Grover Cleveland	John Montgomery Smith	177,282
Democratic Party	Grover Cleveland	John Black	177,281
Democratic Party	Grover Cleveland	James J. Hogan	177,221
Democratic Party	Grover Cleveland	William F. Cirkel	177,180
Democratic Party	Grover Cleveland	Lewis S. Bailey	177,171
Democratic Party	Grover Cleveland	John Wattawa	177,053
Republican Party	Benjamin Harrison	Ole Larson	170,846
Republican Party	Benjamin Harrison	John Pritzlaff	170,791
Republican Party	Benjamin Harrison	John F. Bruss	170,786
Republican Party	Benjamin Harrison	Frederick W. Coon	170,765
Republican Party	Benjamin Harrison	Samuel W. Reese	170,745
Republican Party	Benjamin Harrison	Eli Hawks	170,741
Republican Party	Benjamin Harrison	Robert L. D. Potter	170,740
Republican Party	Benjamin Harrison	Christian S. Otjen	170,726
Republican Party	Benjamin Harrison	Tosten I. Gilbert	170,717
Republican Party	Benjamin Harrison	Edward H. Winchester	170,684
Republican Party	Benjamin Harrison	William H. Hatton	170,677
Republican Party	Benjamin Harrison	Jerome F. Coe	170,525
Prohibition Party	John Bidwell	Sofas C. Miller	13,132
Prohibition Party	John Bidwell	James N. Crawford	13,124
Prohibition Party	John Bidwell	Warren C. Jones	13,120
Prohibition Party	John Bidwell	James S. Thompson	13,118
Prohibition Party	John Bidwell	William Drake	13,117
Prohibition Party	John Bidwell	John C. Plumb	13,117
Prohibition Party	John Bidwell	Thorvild K. Thorvildson	13,116
Prohibition Party	John Bidwell	Jacob O. Lindham	13,113
Prohibition Party	John Bidwell	W. W. Link	13,113
Prohibition Party	John Bidwell	John H. Peoberthy	13,113
Prohibition Party	John Bidwell	Norman H. Brokaw	13,109
Prohibition Party	John Bidwell	Oliver H. Crowl	13,104
People's Party	James B. Weaver	Peter Haan	9,909
People's Party	James B. Weaver	Nathan E. Moody	9,829
People's Party	James B. Weaver	Nelson E. Allen	9,825
People's Party	James B. Weaver	William Schwartz	9,818
People's Party	James B. Weaver	Samuel Smith	9,816
People's Party	James B. Weaver	George C. Chaffee	9,813
People's Party	James B. Weaver	James W. Godfrey	9,813
People's Party	James B. Weaver	William Campbell	9,810
People's Party	James B. Weaver	Anson B. Severence	9,803
People's Party	James B. Weaver	George W. Jackson	9,801
People's Party	James B. Weaver	Ernest Pagel	9,799
People's Party	James B. Weaver	Llewellyn Sutliff	9,791
Write-in		Scattering	2
		Blank	127
Votes cast (Note: Based on totals for highest elector on each ticket)			371,351

=== Results by county ===
County	Grover Cleveland Democratic		Benjamin Harrison Republican		John Bidwell Prohibition		James B. Weaver Populist		Margin		Total votes cast (Note: Based on highest elector on each ticket)
County	#	%	#	%	#	%	#	%	#	%	Total votes cast
Adams	402	28.49%	972	68.89%	22	1.56%	15	1.06%	-570	-40.40%	1,411
Ashland	2,436	49.75%	2,265	46.26%	139	2.84%	56	1.14%	171	3.49%	4,896
Barron	767	24.20%	1,818	57.35%	194	6.12%	390	12.30%	-1,051	-33.15%	3,170 (Note: Includes 1 Blank vote)
Bayfield	1,349	46.44%	1,467	50.50%	61	2.10%	28	0.96%	-118	-4.06%	2,905
Brown	3,653	54.26%	2,855	42.41%	180	2.67%	44	0.65%	798	11.85%	6,732
Buffalo	1,393	45.24%	1,523	49.46%	60	1.95%	103	3.35%	-130	-4.22%	3,079
Burnett	55	7.68%	406	56.70%	163	22.77%	92	12.85%	-243 (Note: Harrison's margin over Bidwell)	-33.93%	716
Calumet	1,863	64.67%	909	31.55%	26	0.90%	83	2.88%	954	33.11%	2,881
Chippewa	2,530	50.57%	1,975	39.48%	182	3.64%	316	6.32%	555	11.09%	5,003
Clark	1,711	43.23%	2,039	51.52%	161	4.07%	47	1.19%	-328	-8.29%	3,958
Columbia	2,957	43.96%	3,313	49.25%	409	6.08%	48	0.71%	-356	-5.29%	6,727
Crawford	1,615	46.68%	1,727	49.91%	39	1.13%	79	2.28%	-112	-3.24%	3,460
Dane	6,833	47.62%	6,445	44.92%	980	6.83%	88	0.61%	388	2.70%	14,348 (Note: Includes 2 Blank votes)
Dodge	6,820	70.23%	2,645	27.24%	199	2.05%	47	0.48%	4,175	42.99%	9,711
Door	1,007	36.71%	1,596	58.18%	68	2.48%	72	2.62%	-589	-21.47%	2,743
Douglas	2,340	40.02%	2,967	50.74%	206	3.52%	334	5.71%	-627	-10.72%	5,847
Dunn	1,257	29.51%	2,169	50.93%	221	5.19%	612	14.37%	-912	-21.41%	4,259
Eau Claire	2,383	41.90%	2,719	47.80%	400	7.03%	186	3.27%	-336	-5.91%	5,688
Florence	195	29.50%	449	67.93%	12	1.82%	5	0.76%	-254	-38.43%	661
Fond du Lac	5,254	54.03%	4,131	42.48%	239	2.46%	101	1.04%	1,123	11.55%	9,725
Forest	228	48.41%	223	47.35%	14	2.97%	6	1.27%	5	1.06%	471
Grant	3,685	43.89%	4,217	50.23%	418	4.98%	76	0.91%	-532	-6.34%	8,396
Green	2,052	40.57%	2,329	46.05%	350	6.92%	327	6.47%	-277	-5.48%	5,058
Green Lake	1,810	53.92%	1,430	42.60%	97	2.89%	20	0.60%	380	11.32%	3,357
Iowa	2,336	46.76%	2,275	45.54%	356	7.13%	29	0.58%	61	1.22%	4,996
Jackson	1,160	33.36%	2,078	59.76%	209	6.01%	30	0.86%	-918	-26.40%	3,477
Jefferson	4,661	61.53%	2,679	35.37%	211	2.79%	24	0.32%	1,982	26.17%	7,575
Juneau	1,978	47.91%	1,945	47.11%	144	3.49%	62	1.50%	33	0.80%	4,129
Kenosha	1,928	51.28%	1,628	43.30%	69	1.84%	16	0.43%	300	7.98%	3,760 (Note: Includes 119 Blank votes)
Kewaunee	2,046	78.81%	518	19.95%	7	0.27%	24	0.92%	1,528	58.86%	2,596 (Note: Includes 1 Scattering vote)
La Crosse	3,810	44.24%	3,693	42.88%	358	4.16%	752	8.73%	117	1.36%	8,613
Lafayette	2,286	46.25%	2,366	47.87%	209	4.23%	82	1.66%	-80	-1.62%	4,943
Langlade	1,289	58.62%	845	38.43%	48	2.18%	17	0.77%	444	20.19%	2,199
Lincoln	1,443	49.45%	997	34.17%	80	2.74%	398	13.64%	446	15.28%	2,918
Manitowoc	4,349	64.79%	2,276	33.91%	29	0.43%	58	0.86%	2,073	30.88%	6,712
Marathon	3,791	63.94%	1,959	33.04%	71	1.20%	108	1.82%	1,832	30.90%	5,929
Marinette	1,994	46.52%	1,837	42.86%	192	4.48%	263	6.14%	157	3.66%	4,286
Marquette	1,198	56.14%	877	41.10%	52	2.44%	7	0.33%	321	15.04%	2,134
Milwaukee	24,606	48.49%	24,343	47.97%	507	1.00%	1,286	2.53%	263	0.52%	50,742
Monroe	2,458	45.80%	2,530	47.14%	273	5.09%	106	1.98%	-72	-1.34%	5,367
Oconto	1,499	50.92%	1,275	43.31%	42	1.43%	128	4.35%	224	7.61%	2,944
Oneida	1,317	51.81%	1,149	45.20%	30	1.18%	46	1.81%	168	6.61%	2,542
Outagamie	4,545	59.72%	2,733	35.91%	224	2.94%	109	1.43%	1,812	23.81%	7,611
Ozaukee	2,094	74.71%	652	23.26%	8	0.29%	49	1.75%	1,442	51.44%	2,803
Pepin	539	36.01%	865	57.78%	83	5.54%	10	0.67%	-326	-21.78%	1,497
Pierce	1,210	30.14%	2,315	57.66%	300	7.47%	190	4.73%	-1,105	-27.52%	4,015
Polk	585	23.90%	1,477	60.33%	175	7.15%	211	8.62%	-892	-36.44%	2,448
Portage	2,570	50.21%	2,291	44.75%	214	4.18%	44	0.86%	279	5.45%	5,119
Price	876	41.87%	1,099	52.53%	84	4.02%	33	1.58%	-223	-10.66%	2,092
Racine	3,750	43.79%	3,956	46.19%	352	4.11%	506	5.91%	-206	-2.41%	8,564
Richland	1,670	38.05%	2,194	49.99%	231	5.26%	294	6.70%	-524	-11.94%	4,389
Rock	4,231	38.62%	6,052	55.24%	552	5.04%	121	1.10%	-1,821	-16.62%	10,956
Sauk	3,139	45.74%	3,277	47.76%	396	5.77%	50	0.73%	-138	-2.01%	6,862
Sawyer	328	41.84%	413	52.68%	37	4.72%	6	0.77%	-85	-10.84%	784
Shawano	2,040	55.37%	1,322	35.88%	49	1.33%	273	7.41%	718	19.49%	3,684
Sheboygan	5,126	56.74%	3,638	40.27%	98	1.08%	172	1.90%	1,488	16.47%	9,034
St. Croix	2,220	42.33%	2,467	47.04%	373	7.11%	184	3.51%	-247	-4.71%	5,244
Taylor	904	53.21%	734	43.20%	29	1.71%	32	1.88%	170	10.01%	1,699
Trempealeau	1,521	38.49%	2,116	53.54%	277	7.01%	38	0.96%	-595	-15.06%	3,952
Vernon	1,440	27.79%	3,106	59.95%	253	4.88%	382	7.37%	-1,666	-32.16%	5,181
Walworth	2,153	32.55%	3,871	58.52%	512	7.74%	79	1.19%	-1,718	-25.97%	6,615
Washburn	305	36.14%	488	57.82%	35	4.15%	16	1.90%	-183	-21.68%	844
Washington	2,624	60.25%	1,700	39.04%	23	0.53%	8	0.18%	924	21.22%	4,355
Waukesha	3,635	47.97%	3,600	47.51%	248	3.27%	89	1.17%	35	0.46%	7,578 (Note: Includes 1 Scattering vote and 5 Blank votes)
Waupaca	2,186	36.83%	3,397	57.23%	306	5.15%	47	0.79%	-1,211	-20.40%	5,936
Waushara	787	25.76%	2,091	68.45%	141	4.62%	36	1.18%	-1,304	-42.68%	3,055
Winnebago	5,893	49.60%	5,354	45.06%	351	2.95%	283	2.38%	539	4.54%	11,881
Wood	2,220	54.29%	1,779	43.51%	54	1.32%	36	0.88%	441	10.79%	4,089
Total	177,335	47.75%	170,846	46.01%	13,132	3.54%	9,909	2.67%	6,489	1.75%	371,351

==== Counties that flipped from Republican to Democratic ====
- Ashland
- Chippewa
- Dane
- Forest
- Green Lake
- Iowa
- Juneau
- Kenosha
- La Crosse
- Lincoln
- Marinette
- Marquette
- Milwaukee
- Oconto
- Portage
- Shawano
- Taylor
- Waukesha
- Winnebago

== See also ==
- United States presidential elections in Wisconsin
