= 1936 United States presidential election in Wisconsin =

- November 3, 1936

| Nominee | Franklin D. Roosevelt | Alf Landon |
| Party | Democratic | Republican |
| Home state | New York | Kansas |
| Running mate | John Nance Garner | Frank Knox |
| Electoral vote | 12 | 0 |
| Popular vote | 802,984 | 380,828 |
| Percentage | 63.79% | 30.26% |
County results
Roosevelt
40–50%
50–60%
60–70%
70–80%
Landon
40–50%
50–60%
President before election
Franklin D. Roosevelt
Democratic
Elected President
Franklin D. Roosevelt
Democratic

The 1936 United States presidential election in Wisconsin was held on November 3, 1936, as part of the 1936 United States presidential election. State voters chose 12 electors to the Electoral College, who voted for president and vice president.

Wisconsin had since the decline of the Populist movement been substantially a one-party state dominated by the Republican Party. The Democratic Party became entirely uncompetitive outside certain German Catholic counties adjoining Lake Michigan as the upper classes, along with the majority of workers who followed them, completely fled from William Jennings Bryan's agrarian and free silver sympathies. As Democratic strength weakened severely after 1894 – although the state did develop a strong Social-Democratic Party to provide opposition to the GOP – Wisconsin developed the direct Republican primary in 1903 and this ultimately created competition between the "League" under Robert M. La Follette, and the conservative "Regular" faction.

The beginning of the 1910s would see a minor Democratic revival as many La Follette progressives endorsed Woodrow Wilson, but this flirtation would not be long-lasting as Wilson's "Anglophile" foreign policies were severely opposed by Wisconsin's largely German- and Scandinavian-American populace. Subsequent federal elections saw the Midwest desert the Democratic Party even more completely due to supposed preferential treatment of Southern farmers, and in Wisconsin there were never more than three Democrats in the state legislature (and none in the State Senate) between 1921 and 1929.

The Great Depression radically altered the state's politics, as the La Follette family did not support President Herbert Hoover in 1932, with the result that he lost to Democrat Franklin D. Roosevelt by two-to-one. Following a brief Democratic interlude after the 1932 elections, Robert M. La Follette, Jr. formed the Wisconsin Progressive Party and during the 1934 midterm elections that party captured seven of Wisconsin's ten House of Representatives seats and most statewide offices under a platform of improved land conservation and a federal referendum and initiative system. La Follette, despite his respect for Union Party nominee William Lemke, strongly endorsed Roosevelt, whilst Landon based his hopes on traditional Democrats responding to Al Smith's backing of him and the state's farmers' dislike of trade treaties as reducing their access to foreign markets.

At the beginning of the poll it was thought that Union Party candidate Lemke would threaten Roosevelt's hold on Wisconsin's electoral votes as the Midwest had gone through a record heatwave and extreme drought. Republican nominee Alf Landon campaigned in Wisconsin in late September, arguing that Roosevelt's trade agreements with Canada were hurting Wisconsin's farmers, and that racial tolerance in a state where virtually all areas outside inner Milwaukee had become sundown towns alongside academic freedom were critical issues for the state and the nation. Landon did receive a good reception in Milwaukee, but had his hotel invaded in Oshkosh. Senator La Follette did much of the campaigning for Roosevelt in the state, whilst the President focused his campaign on other states of the Midwest.

Late in September, polls showed Roosevelt narrowly leading Landon, although a Gallup poll showed him increasing his lead in Wisconsin. Although no later polls were conducted, as it turned out Roosevelt won convincingly and held his two-to-one 1932 margin, carrying all but four counties. Vis-à-vis the 1932 election, Roosevelt gained significantly in the industrial areas of the northwest – in Douglas County he gained 24 percent on his 1932 figures – and in the urban southeast, but lost in the rural areas lying between these two groups. A substantial vote for Lemke from isolationist German Catholics would pave the way for the traditionally Democratic areas in the east to permanently leave the party with the following election, as this group could not accept the urban bias of the New Deal.

Roosevelt was the first Democrat since Franklin Pierce in 1852 to carry Rock County. As of 2024, this remains the strongest performance by a Democrat in Wisconsin; also, Roosevelt's winning margin of over 422,000 votes is the largest in history for a presidential candidate in Wisconsin.

== Primaries ==
Presidential preference were held for both major parties during the state's spring elections (in April) to select delegates to both the 1936 Democratic National Convention and the 1936 Republican National Convention. In both parties, voters directly elected which delegates they wanted to represent their congressional district at their party's convention. The Republican primary also included the election of at-large delegates for the state. In both primaries, it was indicated on ballots which presidential contender the individuals standing for delegate had pledged themselves to support if elected to the convention. Many prospective delegates running in the Republican primary indicated that they were standing to be elected as uninstructed (un-pledged) delegates.

== General election ==
1936 United States presidential election in Wisconsin
| Party | Candidate | Votes | Percentage | Electoral votes |
|---|---|---|---|---|
| Democratic | Franklin D. Roosevelt (incumbent) | 802,984 | 63.79% | 12 |
| Republican | Alf Landon | 380,828 | 30.26% | 0 |
| Union (Note: Listed as "Independent Union" in Wisconsin) | William Lemke | 60,297 | 4.79% | 0 |
| Social-Democratic | Norman Thomas | 10,626 | 0.84% | 0 |
| Communist (Note: Listed as "Independent Communist" in Wisconsin) | Earl R. Browder | 2,197 | 0.17% | 0 |
| Independent (Note: Listed as "Independent Prohibition" in Wisconsin) | D. Leigh Colvin | 1,071 | 0.09% | 0 |
| Socialist Labor (Note: Listed as "Independent Socialist Labor" in Wisconsin) | John W. Aiken | 557 | 0.04% | 0 |
| Write-in | Scattering (Note: The Scattering votes are not listed in the 1937 Blue Book. The Board of Canvassers report shows the Scattering vote in its own column, separate from the total vote per county.) | 152 | 0.01% | 0 |
| Totals | | 1,258,712 | 100.00% | 12 |

=== Results by county ===
| County | Franklin D. Roosevelt Democratic | | Alf Landon Republican | | William Lemke Union | | Norman Thomas Social-Democratic | | Other candidates Various parties | | Margin | | Total votes cast |
| County | # | % | # | % | # | % | # | % | # | % | # | % | Total votes cast |
|---|---|---|---|---|---|---|---|---|---|---|---|---|---|
| Adams | 2,289 | 63.96% | 1,191 | 33.28% | 85 | 2.37% | 5 | 0.14% | 9 | 0.25% | 1,098 | 30.68% | 3,579 |
| Ashland | 5,904 | 68.01% | 2,439 | 28.10% | 226 | 2.60% | 52 | 0.60% | 60 | 0.69% | 3,465 | 39.91% | 8,681 |
| Barron | 7,419 | 55.55% | 5,067 | 37.94% | 714 | 5.35% | 97 | 0.73% | 58 | 0.43% | 2,352 | 17.61% | 13,355 |
| Bayfield | 4,336 | 65.37% | 2,071 | 31.22% | 109 | 1.64% | 64 | 0.96% | 53 | 0.80% | 2,265 | 34.15% | 6,633 |
| Brown | 21,417 | 68.92% | 8,433 | 27.14% | 1,088 | 3.50% | 108 | 0.35% | 31 | 0.10% | 12,984 | 41.78% | 31,077 |
| Buffalo | 3,434 | 55.44% | 2,481 | 40.05% | 249 | 4.02% | 27 | 0.44% | 3 | 0.05% | 953 | 15.39% | 6,194 |
| Burnett | 2,801 | 62.80% | 1,422 | 31.88% | 191 | 4.28% | 33 | 0.74% | 13 | 0.29% | 1,379 | 30.92% | 4,460 |
| Calumet | 4,694 | 65.99% | 1,972 | 27.72% | 424 | 5.96% | 14 | 0.20% | 9 | 0.13% | 2,722 | 38.27% | 7,113 |
| Chippewa | 7,854 | 53.08% | 5,760 | 38.93% | 1,107 | 7.48% | 50 | 0.34% | 25 | 0.17% | 2,094 | 14.15% | 14,796 |
| Clark | 6,931 | 52.78% | 5,196 | 39.57% | 845 | 6.43% | 84 | 0.64% | 76 | 0.58% | 1,735 | 13.21% | 13,132 |
| Columbia | 8,936 | 59.36% | 5,607 | 37.25% | 445 | 2.96% | 38 | 0.25% | 28 | 0.19% | 3,329 | 22.11% | 15,054 |
| Crawford | 4,377 | 55.02% | 2,857 | 35.91% | 699 | 8.79% | 12 | 0.15% | 11 | 0.14% | 1,520 | 19.11% | 7,956 |
| Dane | 35,856 | 67.77% | 15,233 | 28.79% | 1,333 | 2.52% | 268 | 0.51% | 218 | 0.41% | 20,623 | 38.98% | 52,908 |
| Dodge | 14,782 | 65.41% | 6,829 | 30.22% | 900 | 3.98% | 66 | 0.29% | 22 | 0.10% | 7,953 | 35.19% | 22,599 |
| Door | 3,952 | 51.57% | 3,146 | 41.05% | 535 | 6.98% | 11 | 0.14% | 20 | 0.26% | 806 | 10.52% | 7,664 |
| Douglas | 16,684 | 75.28% | 5,079 | 22.92% | 192 | 0.87% | 90 | 0.41% | 118 | 0.53% | 11,605 | 52.36% | 22,163 |
| Dunn | 5,619 | 51.20% | 4,570 | 41.64% | 702 | 6.40% | 53 | 0.48% | 31 | 0.28% | 1,049 | 9.56% | 10,975 |
| Eau Claire | 10,065 | 58.31% | 6,802 | 39.41% | 331 | 1.92% | 43 | 0.25% | 19 | 0.11% | 3,263 | 18.90% | 17,260 |
| Florence | 1,037 | 53.67% | 800 | 41.41% | 70 | 3.62% | 17 | 0.88% | 8 | 0.41% | 237 | 12.27% | 1,932 |
| Fond du Lac | 14,821 | 57.16% | 9,179 | 35.40% | 1,785 | 6.88% | 70 | 0.27% | 76 | 0.29% | 5,642 | 21.76% | 25,931 |
| Forest | 3,092 | 68.18% | 1,334 | 29.42% | 89 | 1.96% | 13 | 0.29% | 7 | 0.15% | 1,758 | 38.77% | 4,535 |
| Grant | 9,170 | 52.39% | 7,196 | 41.11% | 1,072 | 6.12% | 34 | 0.19% | 31 | 0.18% | 1,974 | 11.28% | 17,503 |
| Green | 5,941 | 60.26% | 3,700 | 37.53% | 165 | 1.67% | 27 | 0.27% | 26 | 0.26% | 2,241 | 22.73% | 9,859 |
| Green Lake | 3,840 | 55.84% | 2,926 | 42.55% | 94 | 1.37% | 8 | 0.12% | 9 | 0.13% | 914 | 13.29% | 6,877 |
| Iowa | 4,988 | 54.85% | 3,623 | 39.84% | 445 | 4.89% | 12 | 0.13% | 26 | 0.29% | 1,365 | 15.01% | 9,094 |
| Iron | 3,319 | 76.46% | 902 | 20.78% | 47 | 1.08% | 5 | 0.12% | 68 | 1.57% | 2,417 | 55.68% | 4,341 |
| Jackson | 4,537 | 65.01% | 2,235 | 32.02% | 181 | 2.59% | 18 | 0.26% | 8 | 0.11% | 2,302 | 32.98% | 6,979 |
| Jefferson | 11,144 | 64.33% | 5,599 | 32.32% | 524 | 3.02% | 40 | 0.23% | 17 | 0.10% | 5,545 | 32.01% | 17,324 |
| Juneau | 4,544 | 55.74% | 3,084 | 37.83% | 488 | 5.99% | 19 | 0.23% | 17 | 0.21% | 1,460 | 17.91% | 8,152 |
| Kenosha | 18,137 | 66.57% | 7,268 | 26.68% | 1,537 | 5.64% | 199 | 0.73% | 104 | 0.38% | 10,869 | 39.89% | 27,245 |
| Kewaunee | 4,971 | 74.01% | 1,527 | 22.73% | 213 | 3.17% | 4 | 0.06% | 2 | 0.03% | 3,444 | 51.27% | 6,717 |
| La Crosse | 14,455 | 63.29% | 7,558 | 33.09% | 769 | 3.37% | 37 | 0.16% | 21 | 0.09% | 6,897 | 30.20% | 22,840 |
| Lafayette | 4,976 | 53.81% | 3,801 | 41.11% | 432 | 4.67% | 18 | 0.19% | 20 | 0.22% | 1,175 | 12.71% | 9,247 |
| Langlade | 5,837 | 67.22% | 2,635 | 30.34% | 126 | 1.45% | 38 | 0.44% | 48 | 0.55% | 3,202 | 36.87% | 8,684 |
| Lincoln | 5,520 | 59.86% | 3,120 | 33.83% | 523 | 5.67% | 36 | 0.39% | 23 | 0.25% | 2,400 | 26.02% | 9,222 |
| Manitowoc | 15,539 | 64.68% | 5,094 | 21.20% | 3,274 | 13.63% | 90 | 0.37% | 29 | 0.12% | 10,445 | 43.47% | 24,026 |
| Marathon | 17,898 | 66.10% | 7,328 | 27.06% | 1,661 | 6.13% | 150 | 0.55% | 39 | 0.14% | 10,570 | 39.04% | 27,076 |
| Marinette | 8,884 | 62.24% | 4,938 | 34.59% | 369 | 2.59% | 65 | 0.46% | 18 | 0.13% | 3,946 | 27.64% | 14,274 |
| Marquette | 1,812 | 46.26% | 1,957 | 49.96% | 135 | 3.45% | 8 | 0.20% | 5 | 0.13% | -145 | -3.70% | 3,917 |
| Milwaukee | 221,512 | 74.59% | 54,811 | 18.46% | 13,100 | 4.41% | 6,311 | 2.13% | 1,224 | 0.41% | 166,701 | 56.14% | 296,958 |
| Monroe | 6,491 | 54.06% | 4,695 | 39.10% | 750 | 6.25% | 40 | 0.33% | 32 | 0.27% | 1,796 | 14.96% | 12,008 |
| Oconto | 6,729 | 60.98% | 3,774 | 34.20% | 454 | 4.11% | 67 | 0.61% | 10 | 0.09% | 2,955 | 26.78% | 11,034 |
| Oneida | 5,208 | 64.65% | 2,294 | 28.48% | 483 | 6.00% | 60 | 0.74% | 11 | 0.14% | 2,914 | 36.17% | 8,056 |
| Outagamie | 16,163 | 59.07% | 9,485 | 34.66% | 1,642 | 6.00% | 50 | 0.18% | 24 | 0.09% | 6,678 | 24.40% | 27,364 |
| Ozaukee | 5,594 | 70.65% | 1,785 | 22.54% | 489 | 6.18% | 36 | 0.45% | 14 | 0.18% | 3,809 | 48.11% | 7,918 |
| Pepin | 1,785 | 51.80% | 1,466 | 42.54% | 177 | 5.14% | 11 | 0.32% | 7 | 0.20% | 319 | 9.26% | 3,446 |
| Pierce | 4,061 | 44.06% | 3,935 | 42.70% | 1,139 | 12.36% | 61 | 0.66% | 20 | 0.22% | 126 | 1.37% | 9,216 |
| Polk | 5,618 | 53.51% | 3,596 | 34.25% | 920 | 8.76% | 334 | 3.18% | 31 | 0.30% | 2,022 | 19.26% | 10,499 |
| Portage | 10,576 | 71.25% | 3,969 | 26.74% | 246 | 1.66% | 32 | 0.22% | 21 | 0.14% | 6,607 | 44.51% | 14,844 |
| Price | 5,098 | 66.62% | 2,215 | 28.95% | 220 | 2.88% | 43 | 0.56% | 76 | 0.99% | 2,883 | 37.68% | 7,652 |
| Racine | 24,474 | 64.54% | 10,850 | 28.61% | 2,052 | 5.41% | 244 | 0.64% | 300 | 0.79% | 13,624 | 35.93% | 37,920 |
| Richland | 4,080 | 46.97% | 4,245 | 48.87% | 294 | 3.38% | 17 | 0.20% | 50 | 0.58% | -165 | -1.90% | 8,686 |
| Rock | 17,991 | 53.34% | 14,693 | 43.56% | 907 | 2.69% | 72 | 0.21% | 66 | 0.20% | 3,298 | 9.78% | 33,729 |
| Rusk | 3,877 | 57.18% | 2,453 | 36.18% | 338 | 4.99% | 80 | 1.18% | 32 | 0.47% | 1,424 | 21.00% | 6,780 |
| Sauk | 8,355 | 56.41% | 5,626 | 37.98% | 757 | 5.11% | 37 | 0.25% | 37 | 0.25% | 2,729 | 18.42% | 14,812 |
| Sawyer | 2,834 | 59.88% | 1,726 | 36.47% | 140 | 2.96% | 23 | 0.49% | 10 | 0.21% | 1,108 | 23.41% | 4,733 |
| Shawano | 8,865 | 68.59% | 3,679 | 28.46% | 274 | 2.12% | 79 | 0.61% | 28 | 0.22% | 5,186 | 40.12% | 12,925 |
| Sheboygan | 17,415 | 62.06% | 8,865 | 31.59% | 1,442 | 5.14% | 234 | 0.83% | 107 | 0.38% | 8,550 | 30.47% | 28,063 |
| St. Croix | 4,679 | 41.71% | 4,316 | 38.47% | 2,153 | 19.19% | 52 | 0.46% | 18 | 0.16% | 363 | 3.24% | 11,218 |
| Taylor | 4,721 | 67.55% | 1,758 | 25.15% | 355 | 5.08% | 112 | 1.60% | 43 | 0.62% | 2,963 | 42.40% | 6,989 |
| Trempealeau | 5,929 | 60.30% | 3,339 | 33.96% | 525 | 5.34% | 21 | 0.21% | 18 | 0.18% | 2,590 | 26.34% | 9,832 |
| Vernon | 6,044 | 53.22% | 4,811 | 42.36% | 459 | 4.04% | 17 | 0.15% | 26 | 0.23% | 1,233 | 10.86% | 11,357 |
| Vilas | 2,559 | 61.69% | 1,298 | 31.29% | 216 | 5.21% | 22 | 0.53% | 53 | 1.28% | 1,261 | 30.40% | 4,148 |
| Walworth | 7,093 | 44.15% | 8,462 | 52.67% | 444 | 2.76% | 52 | 0.32% | 15 | 0.09% | -1,369 | -8.52% | 16,066 |
| Washburn | 3,220 | 61.73% | 1,650 | 31.63% | 303 | 5.81% | 29 | 0.56% | 14 | 0.27% | 1,570 | 30.10% | 5,216 |
| Washington | 7,129 | 58.96% | 3,589 | 29.68% | 1,297 | 10.73% | 60 | 0.50% | 17 | 0.14% | 3,540 | 29.28% | 12,092 |
| Waukesha | 14,982 | 59.47% | 8,921 | 35.41% | 1,125 | 4.47% | 121 | 0.48% | 45 | 0.18% | 6,061 | 24.06% | 25,194 |
| Waupaca | 6,920 | 47.52% | 6,680 | 45.88% | 895 | 6.15% | 46 | 0.32% | 20 | 0.14% | 240 | 1.65% | 14,561 |
| Waushara | 2,636 | 41.05% | 3,302 | 51.43% | 423 | 6.59% | 34 | 0.53% | 26 | 0.40% | -666 | -10.37% | 6,421 |
| Winnebago | 18,522 | 58.57% | 11,679 | 36.93% | 1,201 | 3.80% | 140 | 0.44% | 79 | 0.25% | 6,843 | 21.64% | 31,621 |
| Wood | 9,982 | 62.57% | 4,902 | 30.73% | 903 | 5.66% | 66 | 0.41% | 100 | 0.63% | 5,080 | 31.84% | 15,953 |
| Totals | 802,984 | 63.79% | 380,828 | 30.26% | 60,297 | 4.79% | 10,626 | 0.84% | 3,977 | 0.32% | 422,156 | 33.54% | 1,258,712 |

==== Counties that flipped from Republican to Democratic ====
- Rock

==== Counties that flipped from Democratic to Republican ====
- Marquette
- Richland
- Waushara

=== Electors ===
These were the names of the electors for each ticket.

| Franklin D. Roosevelt & John Nance Garner Democratic Party | Alf Landon & Frank Knox Republican Party | William Lemke & Thomas C. O'Brien Union Party |
|---|---|---|
| M. L. Richdorf; William B. Rubin; Elizabeth Cook; Paul A. Hemmy Jr.; Bart E. McGonigle; Anthony J. Szozerbinski; Henry L. Nunn; Joseph Barnett; William G. Bate; Gerald F. Clifford; Edwin Larkin; Fred A. Russell | Edward J. Samp; John B. Chapple; George Ingersoll; Robert Caldwell; William L. Graves; Leon Novak; James T. Drought; William Campbell; Wilson S. Delzell; Orville G. Hegner; Charles Dawson; Peter J. Skamser | Anthony Baranowski; William J. Noe; Paul H. Kuehn; Arthur M. Lockard; Joseph F. Walsh; Clement J. Lange; Alice Reddin; Frank W. Smith; Carl N. Dehlinger; Alfred T. Moore; Alfred J. LaGrandeur; Herbert A. Mittelsdorf |

| Earl R. Browder & James W. Ford Communist Party | D. Leigh Colvin & Claude A. Watson Prohibition Party | John W. Aiken & Emil F. Teichert Socialist Labor Party | Norman Thomas & George A. Nelson Social-Democratic Party |
|---|---|---|---|
| Frank B. Metcalfe; Harry Miller; Al Jensen; Glenn P. Turner; Arthur Oschsner; Leonard Place; Clara Palm; Fred Kneevers; William Zuegge; Jesse Winters; Paul Boyd; Ole Blum | John Sekat; Victor E. Tollefson; Dalton G. Johnson; Joseph Gary; George Walker; Frank Ingram; Gussie Battiest; Fern Dobbins; Esther Mattson; Allan Kaufman; Herman Hardrath; Henry Hamberg | Hazel Williams; Charles H. Berryman; Benjamin Hansche; Helen Nichol; Horace G. Willey; Charles H. Mott; Ivan T. Mishoff; Theron Shove; Wallace Schaal; Ida Hopkins; Abraham L. Knapton; Nellie Tribbey | David Lynch; Valdemar Werdier; Louise Weber; William J. Philumalee; Louis Ballin; Alex Gradijan; Steve Paschke; Alfred L. Koeser; Mike Jastinski; William Kelenic; Thomas Henry Bagan; John G. Shepherd |

== See also ==
- United States presidential elections in Wisconsin
