= 1932 United States presidential election in Wisconsin =

- November 8, 1932

Nominee	Franklin D. Roosevelt	Herbert Hoover
Party	Democratic	Republican
Home state	New York	California
Running mate	John Nance Garner	Charles Curtis
Electoral vote	12	0
Popular vote	707,410	347,741
Percentage	63.46%	31.19%
County results
Roosevelt
40–50%
50–60%
60–70%
70–80%
80–90%
Hoover
50–60%
President before election
Herbert Hoover
Republican
Elected President
Franklin D. Roosevelt
Democratic

The 1932 United States presidential election in Wisconsin was held on November 8, 1932, as part of the 1932 United States presidential election. State voters chose 12 electors to the Electoral College, who voted for president and vice president.

Wisconsin had since the decline of the Populist movement been substantially a one-party state dominated by the Republican Party. The Democratic Party became entirely uncompetitive outside certain German Catholic counties adjoining Lake Michigan as the upper classes, along with the majority of workers who followed them, completely fled from William Jennings Bryan's agrarian and free silver sympathies. As Democratic strength weakened severely after 1894 – although the state did develop a strong Social-Democratic Party to provide opposition to the GOP – Wisconsin developed the direct Republican primary in 1903 and this ultimately created competition between the "League" under Robert M. La Follette, and the conservative "Regular" faction.

The beginning of the 1910s would see a minor Democratic revival as many La Follette progressives endorsed Woodrow Wilson, but this flirtation would not be long-lasting as Wilson's "Anglophile" foreign policies were severely opposed by Wisconsin's largely German- and Scandinavian-American populace. Subsequent federal elections saw the Midwest desert the Democratic Party even more completely due to supposed preferential treatment of Southern farmers, and in Wisconsin there were never more than three Democrats in the state legislature (and none in the State Senate) between 1921 and 1929.

The Great Depression, apart from providing a revitalized Social-Democratic Party and small Democratic gains – did not affect the state's politics, which continued to be dominated by the La Follette family, substantially. Nonetheless, given that that family had never endorsed incumbent GOP President Herbert Hoover, the national Republican Party was pleased when a conservative, Walter J. Kohler Sr., won the gubernatorial nomination.

Interviews at the beginning of October said that with the aid of La Follette forces Roosevelt would carry the state, and a poll a week into that month had Democratic nominee and New York Governor Franklin D. Roosevelt ahead of incumbent President Hoover by more than two-to-one. The Progressive leader Robert M. La Follette Jr. announced his support for Roosevelt and the state Democratic ticket, and said Hoover was a "reactionary" and "wrong on every issue". Later polls in October only served to increase Roosevelt's advantage, and in the end he carried Wisconsin by more than two-to-one despite a strong vote for Social-Democratic Party candidate Norman Thomas, who won over twelve percent in Milwaukee County. Wisconsin would prove Thomas' strongest state, although he did not receive half the percentage gained by Eugene V. Debs in 1920.

Roosevelt won every county except the two Yankee strongholds of Rock and Walworth, which had been Calvin Coolidge's best counties when Robert M. La Follette Sr. carried his home state in 1924. With his win in Wisconsin, Roosevelt became the first Democratic presidential candidate since Woodrow Wilson in 1912 to carry the state and the first since Franklin Pierce in 1852 to win the state with a majority of the popular vote (Wilson's win and Grover Cleveland's in 1892 were only pluralities).

Roosevelt's landslide ended many very long streaks of Republican dominance in various counties across the state. Roosevelt was the first Democrat to ever win the following counties: Adams County, Barron County, Burnett County, Clark County, Door County, Dunn County, Eau Claire County, Florence County, Jackson County, Pepin County, Pierce County, Polk County, Richland County, Rusk County, Trempealeau County, and Waupaca County. Roosevelt was also the first Democrat since Pierce in 1852 to carry Vernon County and Waushara County. A number of others had not voted Democratic since various elections in the latter half of the 19th century.

== Results ==
1932 United States presidential election in Wisconsin
Party	Candidate	Votes	Percentage	Electoral votes
Democratic	Franklin D. Roosevelt	707,410	63.46%	12
Republican	Herbert Hoover (incumbent)	347,741	31.19%	0
Social-Democratic	Norman Thomas	53,379	4.79%	0
Independent Communist	William Z. Foster	3,112	0.28%	0
Prohibition	William D. Upshaw	2,672	0.24%	0
Independent Socialist Labor	Verne L. Reynolds	494	0.04%	0
Write-in	Scattering (Note: The Scattering votes are not listed in the 1933 Blue Book. The Board of Canvassers report shows the Scattering vote in its own column, separate from the total vote per county. All 7 Scattering votes were cast in Eau Claire County)	7	0.00%	0
Totals		1,114,815	100.00%	12

=== Results by county ===
County	Franklin D. Roosevelt Democratic		Herbert Hoover Republican		Norman Thomas Social-Democratic		Other candidates Various parties		Margin		Total votes cast
County	#	%	#	%	#	%	#	%	#	%	Total votes cast
Adams	2,120	71.89%	777	26.35%	33	1.12%	19	0.64%	1,343	45.54%	2,949
Ashland	5,405	64.90%	2,646	31.77%	170	2.04%	107	1.28%	2,759	33.13%	8,328
Barron	7,413	63.35%	3,852	32.92%	323	2.76%	113	0.97%	3,561	30.43%	11,701
Bayfield	2,981	55.88%	2,035	38.14%	189	3.54%	130	2.44%	946	17.73%	5,335
Brown	19,990	72.34%	7,150	25.87%	453	1.64%	41	0.15%	12,840	46.46%	27,634
Buffalo	3,252	64.68%	1,711	34.03%	43	0.86%	22	0.44%	1,541	30.65%	5,028
Burnett	2,437	63.58%	1,281	33.42%	90	2.35%	25	0.65%	1,156	30.16%	3,833
Calumet	5,485	80.84%	1,213	17.88%	68	1.00%	19	0.28%	4,272	62.96%	6,785
Chippewa	8,445	62.92%	4,792	35.71%	141	1.05%	43	0.32%	3,653	27.22%	13,421
Clark	8,372	69.77%	3,132	26.10%	362	3.02%	133	1.11%	5,240	43.67%	11,999
Columbia	8,455	61.98%	4,970	36.43%	158	1.16%	58	0.43%	3,485	25.55%	13,641
Crawford	4,754	70.24%	1,943	28.71%	36	0.53%	35	0.52%	2,811	41.53%	6,768
Dane	26,841	56.13%	19,083	39.90%	1,725	3.61%	174	0.36%	7,758	16.22%	47,823
Dodge	15,874	75.06%	4,936	23.34%	298	1.41%	40	0.19%	10,938	51.72%	21,148
Door	4,149	61.61%	2,488	36.95%	76	1.13%	21	0.31%	1,661	24.67%	6,734
Douglas	9,715	51.27%	7,888	41.63%	1,113	5.87%	233	1.23%	1,827	9.64%	18,949
Dunn	4,936	54.19%	3,898	42.80%	225	2.47%	49	0.54%	1,038	11.40%	9,108
Eau Claire	7,565	49.28%	7,487	48.78%	254	1.65%	44	0.29%	78	0.51%	15,350
Florence	965	55.33%	714	40.94%	41	2.35%	24	1.38%	251	14.39%	1,744
Fond du Lac	16,143	64.56%	8,436	33.74%	336	1.34%	89	0.36%	7,707	30.82%	25,004
Forest	2,595	76.03%	768	22.50%	38	1.11%	12	0.35%	1,827	53.53%	3,413
Grant	9,701	60.94%	5,986	37.60%	153	0.96%	79	0.50%	3,715	23.34%	15,919
Green	5,406	61.73%	3,190	36.42%	97	1.11%	65	0.74%	2,216	25.30%	8,758
Green Lake	4,446	66.53%	2,179	32.61%	32	0.48%	26	0.39%	2,267	33.92%	6,683
Iowa	4,621	58.82%	3,113	39.63%	65	0.83%	57	0.73%	1,508	19.20%	7,856
Iron	2,338	66.36%	891	25.29%	115	3.26%	179	5.08%	1,447	41.07%	3,523
Jackson	3,813	64.42%	1,983	33.50%	100	1.69%	23	0.39%	1,830	30.92%	5,919
Jefferson	11,230	68.28%	5,062	30.78%	117	0.71%	39	0.24%	6,168	37.50%	16,448
Juneau	4,723	68.75%	2,018	29.37%	92	1.34%	37	0.54%	2,705	39.37%	6,870
Kenosha	14,373	60.13%	7,307	30.57%	1,972	8.25%	251	1.05%	7,066	29.56%	23,903
Kewaunee	5,200	84.94%	879	14.36%	24	0.39%	19	0.31%	4,321	70.58%	6,122
La Crosse	12,919	62.07%	7,686	36.93%	144	0.69%	63 (Note: The 1933 Blue Book contains a typo for Foster in this county. Per the Board of Canvassers report, the correct figure is 43, not 36. Using the Blue Book figure causes Foster's county figures to not add up to the stated total.)	0.30%	5,233	25.14%	20,812
Lafayette	4,886	59.49%	3,246	39.52%	59	0.72%	22	0.27%	1,640	19.97%	8,213
Langlade	6,332	71.56%	2,340	26.44%	132	1.49%	45	0.51%	3,992	45.11%	8,849
Lincoln	5,093	61.57%	2,958	35.76%	145	1.75%	76	0.92%	2,135	25.81%	8,272
Manitowoc	15,696	75.44%	4,573	21.98%	480	2.31%	56	0.27%	11,123	53.46%	20,805
Marathon	17,744	72.13%	6,210	25.24%	583	2.37%	64	0.26%	11,534	46.88%	24,601
Marinette	6,508	53.41%	5,249	43.08%	380	3.12%	48	0.39%	1,259	10.33%	12,185
Marquette	2,504	63.88%	1,365	34.80%	33	0.84%	20	0.51%	1,139	29.04%	3,922
Milwaukee	170,202	65.62%	54,693	21.09%	32,874	12.67%	1,619	0.62%	115,509	44.53%	259,388
Monroe	6,757	67.88%	3,022	30.36%	94	0.94%	81	0.81%	3,735	37.52%	9,954
Oconto	6,440	68.04%	2,915	30.80%	73	0.77%	37	0.39%	3,525	37.24%	9,465
Oneida	4,542	65.70%	1,992	28.82%	350	5.06%	29	0.42%	2,550	36.89%	6,913
Outagamie	16,186	64.44%	8,517	33.91%	368	1.47%	47	0.19%	7,669	30.53%	25,118
Ozaukee	5,770	80.59%	1,182	16.51%	191	2.67%	17	0.24%	4,588	64.08%	7,160
Pepin	1,931	61.79%	1,152	36.86%	28	0.90%	14	0.45%	779	24.93%	3,125
Pierce	4,115	51.57%	3,537	44.32%	284	3.56%	44	0.55%	578	7.24%	7,980
Polk	5,421	58.72%	3,425	37.10%	320	3.47%	66	0.71%	1,996	21.62%	9,232
Portage	9,195	71.72%	3,434	26.79%	159	1.24%	32	0.25%	5,761	44.94%	12,820
Price	4,114	63.69%	2,023	31.32%	183	2.83%	139	2.15%	2,091	32.37%	6,459
Racine	19,960	60.31%	10,754	32.49%	2,110	6.38%	273	0.82%	9,206	27.82%	33,097
Richland	4,027	54.16%	3,256	43.79%	71	0.95%	81	1.09%	771	10.37%	7,435
Rock	12,612	42.03%	16,825	56.07%	472	1.57%	99	0.33%	-4,213	-14.04%	30,008
Rusk	3,194	59.04%	1,942	35.90%	223	4.12%	51	0.94%	1,252	23.14%	5,410
Sauk	7,638	59.36%	5,063	39.35%	101	0.78%	65	0.51%	2,575	20.01%	12,867
Sawyer	2,381	64.35%	1,179	31.86%	110	2.97%	30	0.81%	1,202	32.49%	3,700
Shawano	7,593	73.24%	2,450	23.63%	285	2.75%	39	0.38%	5,143	49.61%	10,367
Sheboygan	18,029	67.62%	7,454	27.96%	1,029	3.86%	149	0.56%	10,575	39.66%	26,661
St. Croix	6,374	59.58%	4,059	37.94%	218	2.04%	47	0.44%	2,315	21.64%	10,698
Taylor	4,219	70.94%	1,107	18.61%	581	9.77%	40	0.67%	3,112	52.33%	5,947
Trempealeau	5,786	66.06%	2,874	32.81%	62	0.71%	37	0.42%	2,912	33.25%	8,759
Vernon	5,939	65.57%	2,979	32.89%	67	0.74%	72	0.79%	2,960	32.68%	9,057
Vilas	2,036	61.34%	1,138	34.29%	57	1.72%	88	2.65%	898	27.06%	3,319
Walworth	6,790	45.72%	7,858	52.91%	154	1.04%	50	0.34%	-1,068	-7.19%	14,852
Washburn	2,619	60.51%	1,501	34.68%	181	4.18%	27	0.62%	1,118	25.83%	4,328
Washington	8,570	78.02%	2,209	20.11%	186	1.69%	20	0.18%	6,361	57.91%	10,985
Waukesha	13,487	59.65%	8,538	37.76%	516	2.28%	68	0.30%	4,949	21.89%	22,609
Waupaca	8,179	60.42%	5,082	37.54%	237	1.75%	38	0.28%	3,097	22.88%	13,536
Waushara	3,073	53.56%	2,541	44.28%	78	1.36%	46	0.80%	532	9.27%	5,738
Winnebago	15,591	55.98%	11,505	41.31%	594	2.13%	162	0.58%	4,086	14.67%	27,852
Wood	9,215	67.65%	4,100	30.10%	228	1.67%	78	0.57%	5,115	37.55%	13,621
Totals	707,410	63.46%	347,741	31.19%	53,379	4.79%	6,285	0.56%	359,669	32.26%	1,114,815

==== Counties that flipped from Republican to Democratic ====
- Adams
- Ashland
- Barron
- Bayfield
- Buffalo
- Burnett
- Chippewa
- Clark
- Columbia
- Crawford
- Dane
- Dodge
- Door
- Douglas
- Dunn
- Eau Claire
- Florence
- Fond du Lac
- Forest
- Grant
- Green
- Green Lake
- Iowa
- Jackson
- Jefferson
- Juneau
- Kenosha
- La Crosse
- Lafayette
- Lincoln
- Marinette
- Marquette
- Monroe
- Oconto
- Oneida
- Pepin
- Pierce
- Polk
- Price
- Racine
- Richland
- Rusk
- Sauk
- Sawyer
- Shawano
- Sheboygan
- St. Croix
- Taylor
- Trempealeau
- Vernon
- Vilas
- Washburn
- Waukesha
- Waupaca
- Waushara
- Winnebago
- Wood

=== Electors ===
These were the names of the electors for each ticket.

Franklin D. Roosevelt & John Nance Garner Democratic Party	Herbert Hoover & Charles Curtis Republican Party	Norman Thomas & James H. Maurer Social-Democratic Party	William Z. Foster & James W. Ford Communist Party	William D. Upshaw & Frank S. Regan Prohibition Party	Verne L. Reynolds & John W. Aiken Socialist Labor Party
William P. Rubin; Leo P. Fox; Peter Pirsch; B. J. Husting; A. H. Schubert; Anton P. Gawronski; William J. McCauley; Frank W. Bucklin; L. M. Nash; Lewis Nelson; Ferris White; Fred W. Keller	Annie E. Flanders; Cyrus L. Philipp; Arthur L. Olson; Edward Walden; Harry Carthew; George Meredith; Oscar H. Morris; Elizabeth Pantzer; A. M. Christopherson; M. C. Wilharms; Herman T. Lange; Philip E. Nelson	A. L. Reitman; Frank J. Weber; Isma Palmini; Frank Haas; Irwin Labonne; Gladys Pasbrig; Rudolph Beyer; Charles Chuck; Christopher Bloom; Carl Ben; Gerald Gilles; John Johnson	George Bunn; John Plutal; John Cats; Rudolph Longhammer; George Walker; Ben Fifer; John Working; Tony Bolavage; Esther Mattson; Alrick J. Lambert; August Brocker; Sadie Anderson	Edwin Kerswill; Ada L. Ibson; John E. Jones; Jane Robinson; A. S. Fries; William R. Nethercut; John E. Clayton; A. F. Collins; Mrs. A. R. Treat; Florence Kethroe; C. R. Gaylord; Alexander McEathron	Charles S. Ehrhardt; Richard Koeppel; Dimiter Botzeff; Joseph Brautigam; Truman F. Davis; Sam Djakulovich; Mark J. Golubich; Alex Gradijan; Anton Jonas; Steve Paschke; Christopher Stanoff; Adolf Wiggert

== See also ==
- United States presidential elections in Wisconsin
