= 1852 United States presidential election in Wisconsin =

- November 2, 1852

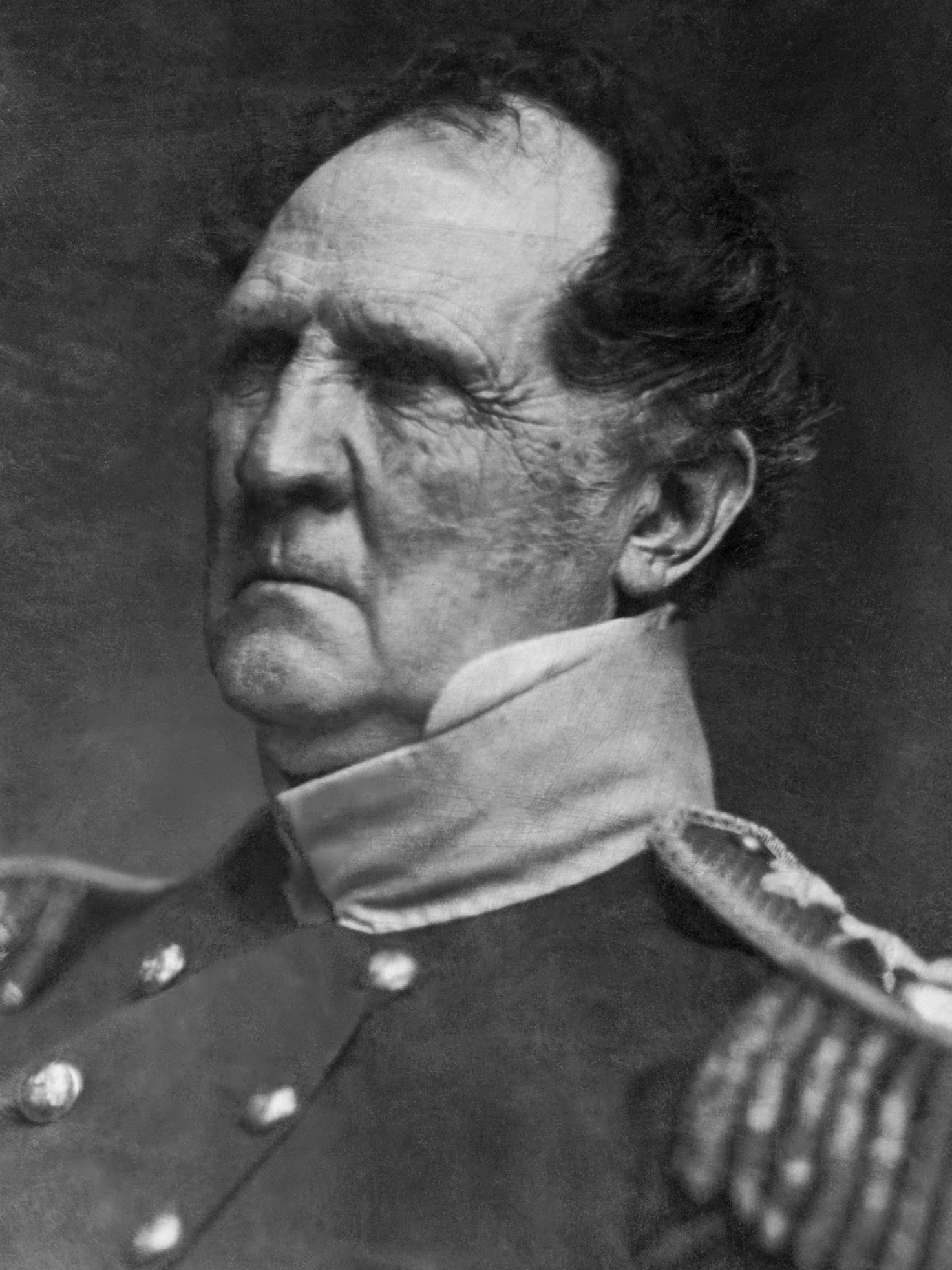

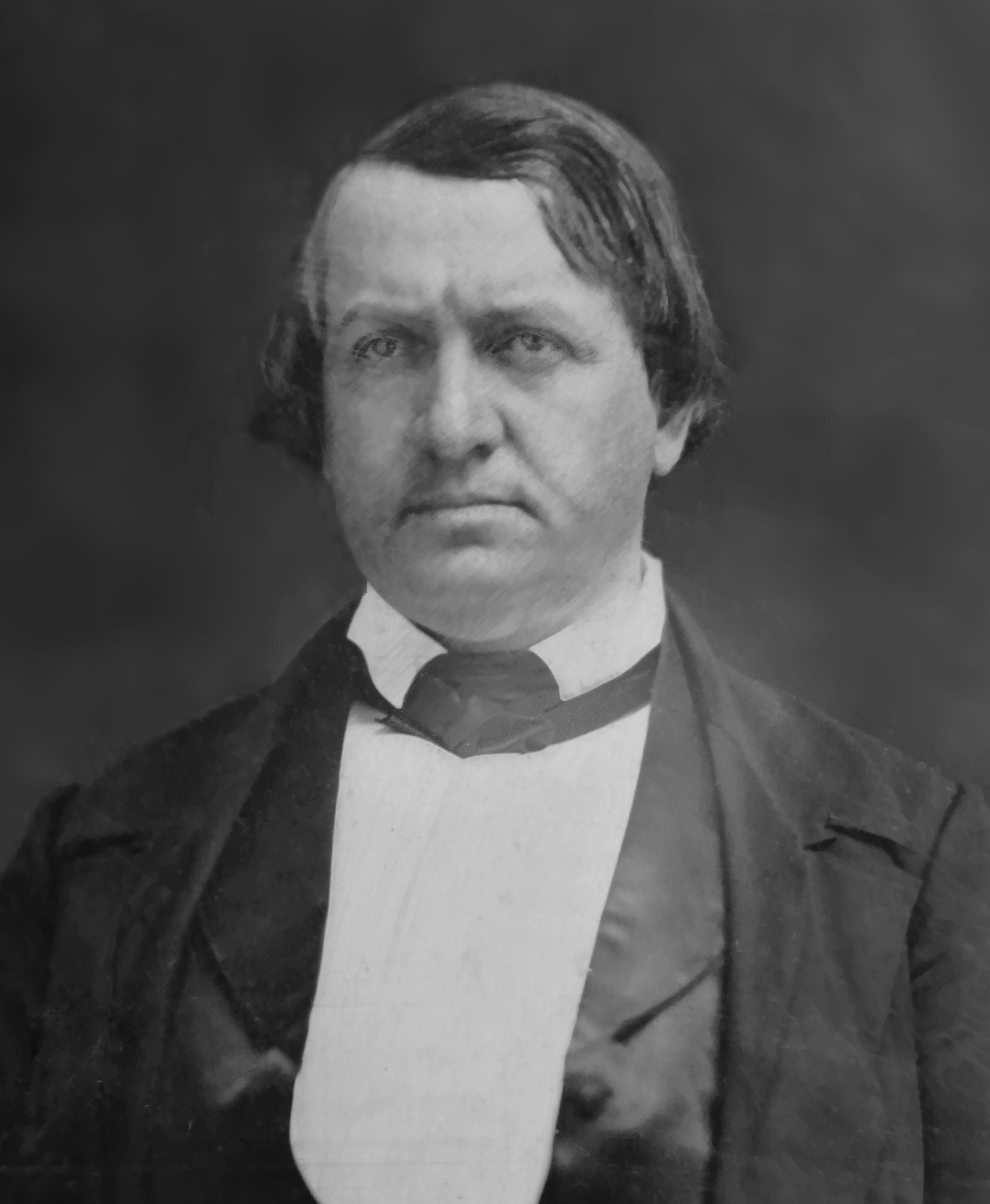
Nominee	Franklin Pierce	Winfield Scott	John P. Hale
Party	Democratic	Whig	Free Soil
Home state	New Hampshire	New Jersey	New Hampshire
Running mate	William R. King	William Alexander Graham	George W. Julian
Electoral vote	5	0	0
Popular vote	33,658	22,240	8,842
Percentage	51.98%	34.35%	13.66%
County results
Pierce
30–40%
40–50%
50–60%
60–70%
80–90%
Scott
40–50%
50–60%
Hale
30–40%
40–50%
President before election
Millard Fillmore
Whig
Elected President
Franklin Pierce
Democratic

The 1852 United States presidential election in Wisconsin was held on November 2, 1852, as part of the 1852 United States presidential election. State voters chose five electors to the Electoral College, who voted for President and Vice President.

Democratic Party candidate Franklin Pierce won the state with 51.98% of the popular vote, winning Wisconsin's five electoral votes.

This would be the final time a Democratic presidential candidate would win Wisconsin until Grover Cleveland won the state in 1892. No Democratic presidential candidate would again win a majority of Wisconsin's popular vote until Franklin D. Roosevelt in 1932.

This was the last election until 1936 in which a Democrat carried Rock County. Additionally, neither Bad Ax (Vernon) County nor Waushara County would vote Democratic again until 1932.

Columbia County, Grant County, Green County, Portag County, Racine County, Rock County, St. Croix County would also not vote for a Democrat again until 1912.

== Results ==
General Election Results
Party	Pledged to	Elector	Votes
Democratic Party	Franklin Pierce	Montgomery M. Cothren	33,658
Democratic Party	Franklin Pierce	Charles Billinghurst	33,647
Democratic Party	Franklin Pierce	Philo White	33,633
Democratic Party	Franklin Pierce	Beriah Brown	33,631
Democratic Party	Franklin Pierce	Satterlee W. Clark	33,582
Whig Party	Winfield Scott	Myron B. Orton	22,240
Whig Party	Winfield Scott	Charles Bracken	22,240
Whig Party	Winfield Scott	Aaron Schultz	22,211
Whig Party	Winfield Scott	Hiram Tuttle	22,210
Whig Party	Winfield Scott	Lucas S. Van Orden	22,016
Free Soil Party	John P. Hale	C. Latham Sholes	8,842
Free Soil Party	John P. Hale	Warren Chase	8,822
Free Soil Party	John P. Hale	Samuel D. Hastings	8,818
Free Soil Party	John P. Hale	Byron Kilbourn	8,814
Free Soil Party	John P. Hale	Benjamin B. Spalding	7,925
Free Soil Party	John P. Hale	Hiram M. Kee (Note: Appears to have replaced Benjamin B. Spalding on some Free Soil ballots)	872
Write-in		Scattering	8
Votes cast (Note: Based on totals for highest elector on each ticket)			64,748

=== Results by county ===
County	Franklin Pierce Democratic		Winfield Scott Whig		John P. Hale Free Soil		Margin		Total votes cast (Note: Based on highest elector on each ticket)
County	#	%	#	%	#	%	#	%	Total votes cast
Bad Ax	87	55.77%	69	44.23%	0	0.00%	18	11.54%	156
Brown	515	60.80%	326	38.49%	6	0.71%	189	22.31%	847
Calumet	294	60.49%	171	35.19%	21	4.32%	123	25.31%	486
Columbia	1,233	51.92%	1,111	46.78%	31	1.31%	122	5.14%	2,375
Crawfor	173	56.91%	131	43.09%	0	0.00%	42	13.82%	304
Dane	2,138	60.58%	1,104	31.28%	287	8.13%	1,034	29.30%	3,529
Dodge	2,264	58.08%	1,204	30.89%	430	11.03%	1,060	27.19%	3,898
Fond du Lac	1,635	52.52%	1,065	34.21%	408	13.11%	570	18.31%	3,113 (Note: Includes 5 Scattering votes)
Grant	1,379	48.40%	1,341	47.07%	129	4.53%	38	1.33%	2,849
Green	865	50.58%	659	38.54%	186	10.88%	206	12.05%	1,710
Iowa	948	50.67%	895	47.84%	27	1.44%	53	2.83%	1,871 (Note: Includes 1 Scattering vote)
Jefferson	1,693	52.01%	1,203	36.96%	359	11.03%	490	15.05%	3,255
Kenosha	590	34.52%	483	28.26%	636	37.21%	-46	-2.69%	1,709
Kewaunee	23	82.14%	5	17.86%	0	0.00%	18	64.29%	28
La Crosse	281	59.41%	182	38.48%	10	2.11%	99	20.93%	473
Lafayette	1,389	61.60%	850	37.69%	16	0.71%	539	23.90%	2,255
Manitowoc	874	80.04%	209	19.14%	9	0.82%	665	60.90%	1,092
Marathon	202	59.06%	140	40.94%	0	0.00%	62	18.13%	342
Marquette	982	50.05%	748	38.12%	232	11.82%	234	11.93%	1,962
Milwaukee	3,639	58.85%	2,017	32.62%	527	8.52%	1,622	26.23%	6,183
Outagamie	412	68.33%	140	23.22%	51	8.46%	272	45.11%	603
Portage	377	58.54%	267	41.46%	0	0.00%	110	17.08%	644
Racine	1,308	44.57%	840	28.62%	787	26.81%	468	15.95%	2,935
Richland	166	47.56%	167	47.85%	16	4.58%	-1	-0.29%	349
Rock	1,690	41.01%	1,509	36.62%	920	22.32%	181	4.39%	4,121 (Note: Includes 2 Scattering votes)
Sauk	681	46.68%	622	42.63%	156	10.69%	59	4.04%	1,459
Sheboygan	1,340	60.63%	656	29.68%	214	9.68%	684	30.95%	2,210
St. Croix	166	60.36%	107	38.91%	2	0.73%	59	21.45%	275
Walworth	1,141	32.24%	965	27.27%	1,433	40.49%	-292	-8.25%	3,539
Washington	2,350	63.72%	1,156	31.34%	182	4.93%	1,194	32.38%	3,688
Waukesha	1,614	44.37%	949	26.09%	1,075	29.55%	539 (Note: Pierce's margin over Hale)	14.82%	3,638
Waupaca	86	47.25%	95	52.20%	1	0.55%	-9	-4.95%	182
Waushara	174	39.82%	147	33.64%	116	26.54%	27	6.18%	437
Winnebago	949	42.54%	707	31.69%	575	25.77%	242	10.85%	2,231
Total	33,658	51.98%	22,240	34.35%	8,842	13.66%	11,418	17.63%	64,748

==== Counties that flipped from Whig to Democratic ====
- Columbia
- Grant
- Green
- Iowa
- Marquette
- Winnebago

==== Counties that flipped from Free Soil to Democratic ====
- Fond du Lac
- Racine
- Rock
- Sauk
- Waukesha

== See also ==
- United States presidential elections in Wisconsin
