= 1912 United States presidential election in Wisconsin =

- November 5, 1912

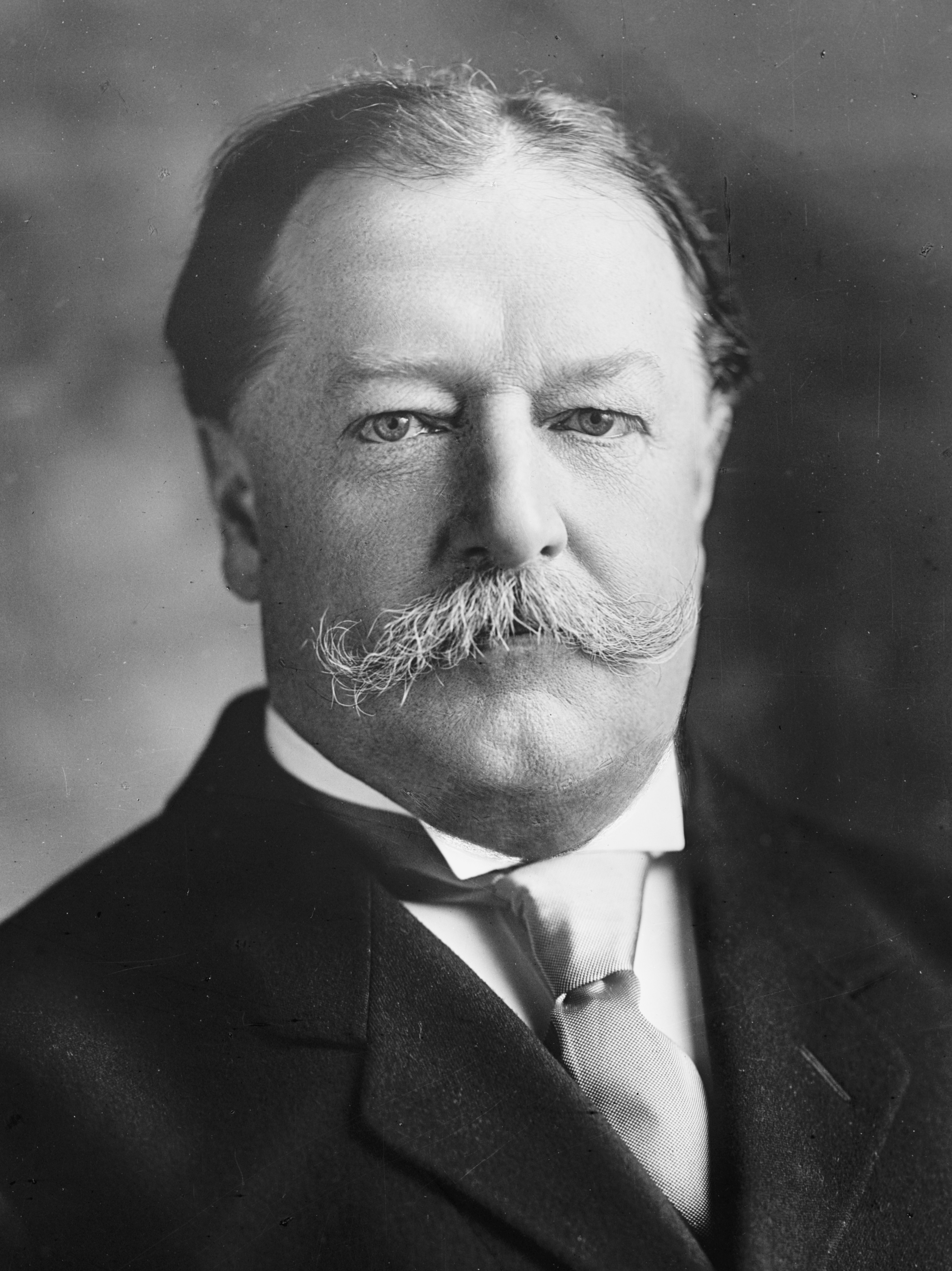

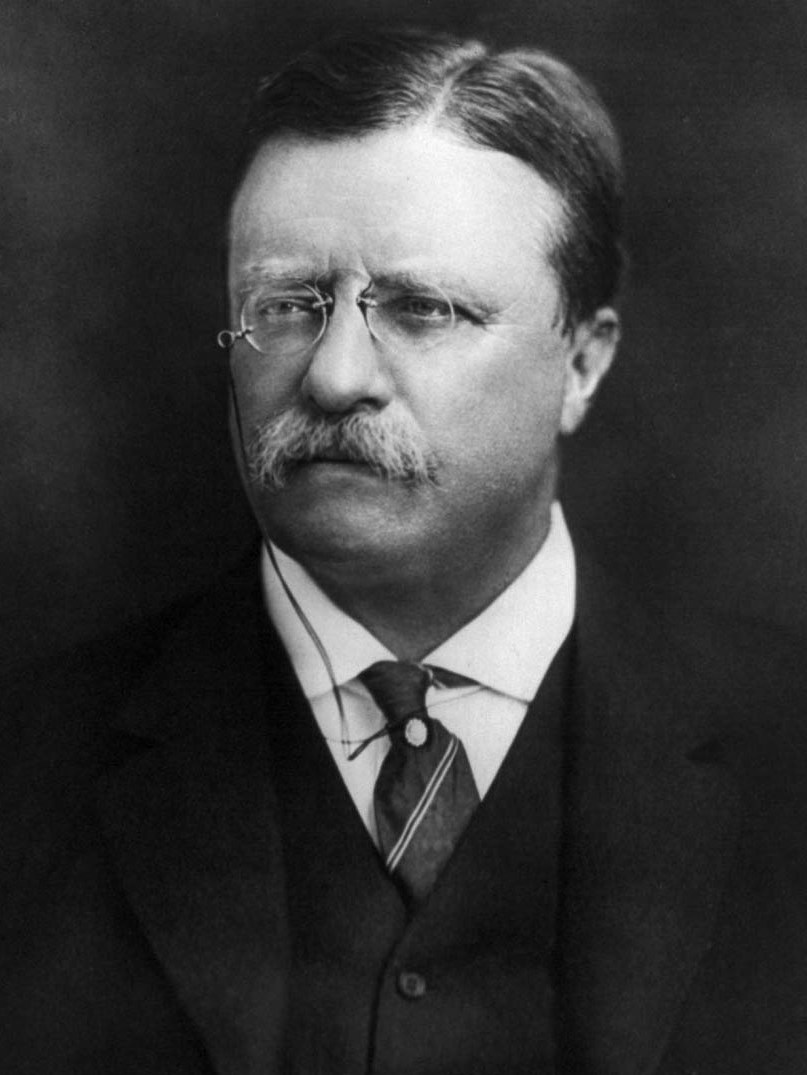

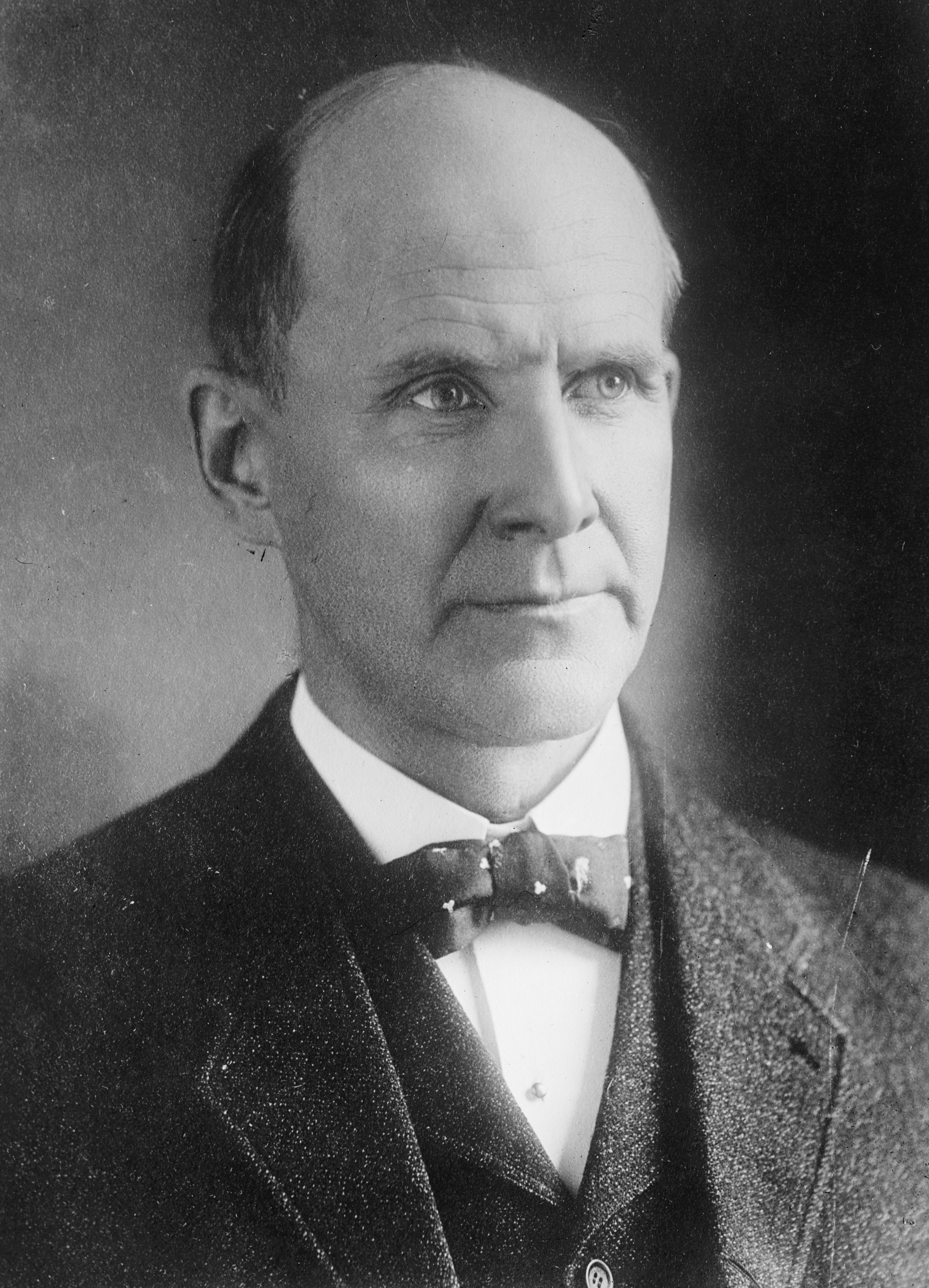
| Nominee | Woodrow Wilson | William Howard Taft |
| Party | Democratic | Republican |
| Home state | New Jersey | Ohio |
| Running mate | Thomas R. Marshall | Nicholas Murray Butler |
| Electoral vote | 13 | 0 |
| Popular vote | 164,230 | 130,596 |
| Percentage | 41.06% | 32.65% |
| Nominee | Theodore Roosevelt | Eugene V. Debs |
| Party | Progressive Independent | Social-Democratic |
| Home state | New York | Indiana |
| Running mate | Hiram Johnson | Emil Seidel |
| Electoral vote | 0 | 0 |
| Popular vote | 62,448 | 33,476 |
| Percentage | 15.61% | 8.37% |
County results
Wilson
30–40%
40–50%
50–60%
60–70%
Taft
20–30%
30–40%
40–50%
50–60%
Roosevelt
30–40%
40–50%
President before election
William Howard Taft
Republican
Elected President
Woodrow Wilson
Democratic

The 1912 United States presidential election in Wisconsin was held on November 5, 1912 as part of the 1912 United States presidential election. State voters chose 13 electors to the Electoral College, who voted for president and vice president.

Ever since the decline of the Populist movement, Wisconsin had become almost a one-party state dominated by the Republican Party. The Democratic Party became entirely uncompetitive outside certain German Catholic counties adjoining Lake Michigan as the upper classes, along with the majority of workers who followed them, completely fled from William Jennings Bryan’s agrarian and free silver sympathies. As Democratic strength weakened severely after 1894 – although the state did develop a strong Social-Democratic Party to provide opposition to the GOP – Wisconsin developed the direct Republican primary in 1903 and this ultimately created competition between the “League” under Robert M. La Follette, and the conservative “Regular” faction.

At the turn of the decade, the Democratic Party underwent a brief revival, as it made significant gains upon its small share of state legislative seats and many people in the state saw in New Jersey Governor Woodrow Wilson the possibility of the party returning to the progressive ideals it was felt to have deserted with Bryan fifteen years beforehand. Wilson campaigned in the state as early as 1911 – long before he was the official Democratic nominee – and was soon able to get many Republicans who had supported La Follette onto his bandwagon, and retained them despite former President Theodore Roosevelt running his own “Bull Moose” campaign as a result of the ongoing national split in the Republican Party. Once regular nominee and incumbent Present William Howard Taft ceased campaigning in August, La Follette's ability to hold Progressive GOP support for Wilson – outside the Scandinavian Lake Superior Lowland where Roosevelt controlled this group – meant that Democratic Party candidate Woodrow Wilson won Wisconsin's thirteen electoral votes with 41.07 percent of the popular vote.

La Follette won the Republican primary while Wilson won the Democratic primary. Francis E. McGovern and Andrew H. Dahl were elected to serve as delegates for La Follette in the Republican primary while William D. Hoard ran as a Taft delegate. James William Murphy and George Wilbur Peck ran as delegates for Champ Clark while William F. Wolfe ran as a delegate for Wilson.

With his win, Wilson became the first Democratic presidential candidate to win Wisconsin since Grover Cleveland in 1892. Another Democrat would not carry the state again until Franklin D. Roosevelt in 1932.

As of 2020, this is the only election in which Walworth County voted for a Democratic presidential candidate.

== Results ==
1912 United States presidential election in Wisconsin
| Party | Candidate | Votes | Percentage | Electoral votes |
|---|---|---|---|---|
| Democratic | Woodrow Wilson | 164,230 | 41.06% | 13 |
| Republican | William Howard Taft (incumbent) | 130,596 | 32.65% | 0 |
| Progressive Independent | Theodore Roosevelt | 62,448 | 15.61% | 0 |
| Social-Democratic | Eugene V. Debs | 33,476 | 8.37% | 0 |
| Prohibition | Eugene Chafin | 8,584 | 2.15% | 0 |
| Independent | Arthur E. Reimer | 632 | 0.16% | 0 |
| Write-ins | — | 9 | 0.00% | 0 |
| Totals | | 399,334 | 100.0% | 13 |

=== Results by county ===
| County | Woodrow Wilson Democratic | | William Howard Taft Republican | | Theodore Roosevelt Progressive | | Eugene V. Debs Social-Democratic | | Other candidates Various parties | | Margin | | Total votes cast |
| County | # | % | # | % | # | % | # | % | # | % | # | % | Total votes cast |
|---|---|---|---|---|---|---|---|---|---|---|---|---|---|
| Adams | 462 | 30.90% | 689 | 46.09% | 204 | 13.65% | 66 | 4.41% | 74 | 4.95% | -227 | -15.19% | 1,495 |
| Ashland | 1,451 | 41.54% | 937 | 26.83% | 677 | 19.38% | 315 | 9.02% | 113 | 3.24% | 514 | 14.71% | 3,493 |
| Barron | 1,065 | 26.83% | 1,414 | 35.62% | 968 | 24.38% | 265 | 6.68% | 258 | 6.50% | -349 | -8.79% | 3,970 |
| Bayfield | 666 | 29.84% | 514 | 23.03% | 671 | 30.06% | 306 | 13.71% | 75 | 3.36% | -5 (Note: In this county where Taft ran behind both Roosevelt and Wilson (but ahead of Debs) margin given is Wilson vote minus Roosevelt vote and percentage margin Wilson percentage minus Roosevelt percentage.) | -0.22% | 2,232 |
| Brown | 3,557 | 42.16% | 2,764 | 32.76% | 1,396 | 16.55% | 569 | 6.74% | 151 | 1.79% | 793 | 9.40% | 8,437 |
| Buffalo | 848 | 33.29% | 1,239 | 48.65% | 372 | 14.61% | 45 | 1.77% | 43 | 1.69% | -391 | -15.36% | 2,547 |
| Burnett | 305 | 20.24% | 403 | 26.74% | 570 | 37.82% | 172 | 11.41% | 57 | 3.78% | -167 (Note: In this county where Wilson ran third behind both Taft and Roosevelt, margin given is Taft vote minus Roosevelt vote and percentage margin Taft percentage minus Roosevelt percentage.) | -11.08% | 1,507 |
| Calumet | 1,366 | 47.76% | 931 | 32.55% | 454 | 15.87% | 85 | 2.97% | 24 | 0.84% | 435 | 15.21% | 2,860 |
| Chippewa | 2,028 | 39.63% | 1,736 | 33.93% | 1,132 | 22.12% | 102 | 1.99% | 119 | 2.33% | 292 | 5.70% | 5,117 |
| Clark | 1,528 | 34.24% | 2,035 | 45.61% | 648 | 14.52% | 143 | 3.20% | 108 | 2.42% | -507 | -11.37% | 4,462 |
| Columbia | 2,473 | 42.73% | 2,463 | 42.55% | 583 | 10.07% | 121 | 2.09% | 148 | 2.56% | 10 | 0.18% | 5,788 |
| Crawford | 1,515 | 44.86% | 1,407 | 41.66% | 321 | 9.51% | 69 | 2.04% | 65 | 1.92% | 108 | 3.20% | 3,377 |
| Dane | 9,017 | 55.80% | 5,244 | 32.45% | 1,202 | 7.44% | 298 | 1.84% | 399 | 2.47% | 3,773 | 23.35% | 16,160 |
| Dodge | 5,246 | 59.97% | 2,559 | 29.26% | 705 | 8.06% | 118 | 1.35% | 119 | 1.36% | 2,687 | 30.71% | 8,747 |
| Door | 769 | 27.12% | 1,167 | 41.15% | 690 | 24.33% | 72 | 2.54% | 138 | 4.87% | -398 | -14.03% | 2,836 |
| Douglas | 1,181 | 23.00% | 730 | 14.22% | 2,285 | 44.51% | 752 | 14.65% | 186 | 3.62% | -1,104 | -21.51% | 5,134 |
| Dunn | 833 | 22.24% | 1,403 | 37.45% | 1,174 | 31.34% | 235 | 6.27% | 101 | 2.70% | 229 | 6.11% | 3,746 |
| Eau Claire | 1,727 | 34.57% | 2,013 | 40.29% | 895 | 17.91% | 239 | 4.78% | 122 | 2.44% | -286 | -5.72% | 4,996 |
| Florence | 131 | 21.83% | 262 | 43.67% | 182 | 30.33% | 15 | 2.50% | 10 | 1.67% | 80 | 13.34% | 600 |
| Fond du Lac | 4,838 | 50.31% | 3,014 | 31.34% | 1,236 | 12.85% | 349 | 3.63% | 179 | 1.86% | 1,824 | 18.97% | 9,616 |
| Forest | 567 | 42.00% | 518 | 38.37% | 212 | 15.70% | 30 | 2.22% | 23 | 1.70% | 49 | 3.63% | 1,350 |
| Grant | 3,615 | 45.84% | 3,283 | 41.63% | 667 | 8.46% | 99 | 1.26% | 222 | 2.82% | 332 | 4.21% | 7,886 |
| Green | 1,716 | 41.61% | 1,601 | 38.82% | 516 | 12.51% | 83 | 2.01% | 208 | 5.04% | 115 | 2.79% | 4,124 |
| Green Lake | 1,407 | 47.15% | 1,269 | 42.53% | 195 | 6.53% | 39 | 1.31% | 74 | 2.48% | 138 | 4.62% | 2,984 |
| Iowa | 2,103 | 44.90% | 1,886 | 40.26% | 438 | 9.35% | 32 | 0.68% | 225 | 4.80% | 217 | 4.64% | 4,684 |
| Iron | 347 | 29.33% | 473 | 39.98% | 254 | 21.47% | 72 | 6.09% | 37 | 3.13% | -126 | -10.65% | 1,183 |
| Jackson | 606 | 22.88% | 1,398 | 52.77% | 477 | 18.01% | 78 | 2.94% | 90 | 3.40% | -792 | -29.89% | 2,649 |
| Jefferson | 4,381 | 62.40% | 1,926 | 27.43% | 490 | 6.98% | 100 | 1.42% | 124 | 1.77% | 2,455 | 34.97% | 7,021 |
| Juneau | 1,236 | 38.78% | 1,322 | 41.48% | 435 | 13.65% | 135 | 4.24% | 59 | 1.85% | -86 | -2.70% | 3,187 |
| Kenosha | 2,216 | 36.09% | 1,671 | 27.21% | 1,649 | 26.85% | 492 | 8.01% | 113 | 1.84% | 545 | 8.88% | 6,141 |
| Kewaunee | 1,696 | 54.32% | 1,115 | 35.71% | 263 | 8.42% | 22 | 0.70% | 26 | 0.83% | 581 | 18.61% | 3,122 |
| La Crosse | 4,263 | 53.07% | 2,272 | 28.28% | 999 | 12.44% | 337 | 4.20% | 162 | 2.02% | 1,991 | 24.79% | 8,033 |
| Lafayette | 1,852 | 41.50% | 1,747 | 39.14% | 756 | 16.94% | 28 | 0.63% | 80 | 1.79% | 105 | 2.36% | 4,463 |
| Langlade | 1,387 | 45.72% | 710 | 23.40% | 810 | 26.70% | 91 | 3.00% | 36 | 1.19% | 577 | 19.02% | 3,034 |
| Lincoln | 1,760 | 52.41% | 712 | 21.20% | 627 | 18.67% | 212 | 6.31% | 47 | 1.40% | 1,048 | 31.21% | 3,358 |
| Manitowoc | 3,436 | 44.74% | 2,389 | 31.11% | 919 | 11.97% | 890 | 11.59% | 46 | 0.60% | 1,047 | 13.63% | 7,680 |
| Marathon | 4,043 | 44.26% | 3,033 | 33.20% | 1,274 | 13.95% | 597 | 6.54% | 188 | 2.06% | 1,010 | 11.06% | 9,135 |
| Marinette | 1,559 | 33.29% | 1,618 | 34.55% | 1,125 | 24.02% | 276 | 5.89% | 105 | 2.24% | -59 | -1.26% | 4,683 |
| Marquette | 923 | 41.30% | 881 | 39.42% | 365 | 16.33% | 22 | 0.98% | 44 | 1.97% | 42 | 1.88% | 2,235 |
| Milwaukee | 27,628 | 38.75% | 17,877 | 25.07% | 5,939 | 8.33% | 19,243 | 26.99% | 615 | 0.86% | 8,385 (Note: In this county where Debs ran second ahead of Roosevelt and Taft, margin given is Wilson vote minus Debs vote and percentage margin Wilson percentage minus Debs percentage.) | 11.76% | 71,302 |
| Monroe | 2,084 | 43.16% | 1,841 | 38.13% | 628 | 13.01% | 125 | 2.59% | 150 | 3.11% | 243 | 5.03% | 4,828 |
| Oconto | 1,523 | 35.77% | 1,988 | 46.69% | 554 | 13.01% | 139 | 3.26% | 54 | 1.27% | -465 | -10.92% | 4,258 |
| Oneida | 717 | 33.87% | 774 | 36.56% | 431 | 20.36% | 175 | 8.27% | 20 | 0.94% | -57 | -2.69% | 2,117 |
| Outagamie | 4,139 | 50.04% | 2,384 | 28.82% | 1,401 | 16.94% | 192 | 2.32% | 155 | 1.87% | 1,755 | 21.22% | 8,271 |
| Ozaukee | 1,878 | 63.27% | 749 | 25.24% | 241 | 8.12% | 76 | 2.56% | 24 | 0.81% | 1,129 | 38.03% | 2,968 |
| Pepin | 410 | 31.06% | 528 | 40.00% | 329 | 24.92% | 27 | 2.05% | 26 | 1.97% | -118 | -8.94% | 1,320 |
| Pierce | 985 | 29.10% | 986 | 29.13% | 1,204 | 35.57% | 102 | 3.01% | 108 | 3.19% | -218 | -6.44% | 3,385 |
| Polk | 830 | 26.56% | 848 | 27.14% | 1,068 | 34.18% | 270 | 8.64% | 109 | 3.49% | -220 | -7.04% | 3,125 |
| Portage | 2,301 | 43.32% | 1,932 | 36.37% | 890 | 16.75% | 101 | 1.90% | 88 | 1.66% | 369 | 6.95% | 5,312 |
| Price | 662 | 27.58% | 708 | 29.50% | 662 | 27.58% | 290 | 12.08% | 78 | 3.25% | -46 | -1.92% | 2,400 |
| Racine | 3,909 | 44.13% | 2,606 | 29.42% | 1,440 | 16.26% | 612 | 6.91% | 291 | 3.29% | 1,303 | 14.71% | 8,858 |
| Richland | 1,493 | 37.72% | 1,623 | 41.01% | 367 | 9.27% | 127 | 3.21% | 348 | 8.79% | -130 | -3.29% | 3,958 |
| Rock | 3,032 | 30.64% | 4,276 | 43.21% | 2,002 | 20.23% | 261 | 2.64% | 324 | 3.27% | -1,244 | -12.57% | 9,895 |
| Rusk | 522 | 30.67% | 575 | 33.78% | 344 | 20.21% | 204 | 11.99% | 57 | 3.35% | -53 | -3.11% | 1,702 |
| Sauk | 432 | 47.52% | 295 | 32.45% | 144 | 15.84% | 15 | 1.65% | 23 | 2.53% | 137 | 15.07% | 909 |
| Sawyer | 1,661 | 36.72% | 1,535 | 33.94% | 1,103 | 24.39% | 99 | 2.19% | 125 | 2.76% | 126 | 2.78% | 4,523 |
| Shawano | 3,968 | 41.23% | 2,692 | 27.97% | 1,628 | 16.91% | 1,084 | 11.26% | 253 | 2.63% | 1,276 | 13.26% | 9,625 |
| Sheboygan | 1,806 | 38.86% | 1,728 | 37.18% | 823 | 17.71% | 188 | 4.04% | 103 | 2.22% | 78 | 1.68% | 4,648 |
| St. Croix | 2,464 | 43.02% | 2,171 | 37.91% | 720 | 12.57% | 67 | 1.17% | 305 | 5.33% | 293 | 5.11% | 5,727 |
| Taylor | 821 | 35.91% | 773 | 33.81% | 379 | 16.58% | 271 | 11.85% | 42 | 1.84% | 48 | 2.10% | 2,286 |
| Trempealeau | 1,235 | 31.28% | 1,763 | 44.66% | 795 | 20.14% | 50 | 1.27% | 105 | 2.66% | -528 | -13.38% | 3,948 |
| Vernon | 1,253 | 27.14% | 2,663 | 57.68% | 463 | 10.03% | 74 | 1.60% | 164 | 3.55% | -1,410 | -30.54% | 4,617 |
| Vilas | 327 | 35.43% | 304 | 32.94% | 212 | 22.97% | 71 | 7.69% | 9 | 0.98% | 23 | 2.49% | 923 |
| Walworth | 2,125 | 36.38% | 2,096 | 35.88% | 1,237 | 21.18% | 78 | 1.34% | 305 | 5.22% | 29 | 0.50% | 5,841 |
| Washburn | 398 | 26.78% | 409 | 27.52% | 488 | 32.84% | 148 | 9.96% | 43 | 2.89% | -79 | -5.32% | 1,486 |
| Washington | 2,425 | 51.57% | 1,799 | 38.26% | 302 | 6.42% | 150 | 3.19% | 26 | 0.55% | 626 | 13.31% | 4,702 |
| Waukesha | 3,594 | 48.82% | 2,714 | 36.86% | 597 | 8.11% | 196 | 2.66% | 261 | 3.55% | 880 | 11.96% | 7,362 |
| Waupaca | 1,563 | 26.70% | 2,204 | 37.66% | 1,767 | 30.19% | 131 | 2.24% | 188 | 3.21% | 437 | 7.47% | 5,853 |
| Waushara | 772 | 25.54% | 1,343 | 44.43% | 741 | 24.51% | 92 | 3.04% | 75 | 2.48% | -571 | -18.89% | 3,023 |
| Winnebago | 4,631 | 41.00% | 1,922 | 17.01% | 4,098 | 36.28% | 478 | 4.23% | 167 | 1.48% | 533 | 4.72% | 11,296 |
| Wood | 2,523 | 47.28% | 1,742 | 32.65% | 525 | 9.84% | 369 | 6.92% | 177 | 3.32% | 781 | 14.63% | 5,336 |
| Totals | 164,230 | 41.06% | 130,596 | 32.65% | 62,448 | 15.61% | 33,476 | 8.37% | 9,225 | 2.31% | 33,634 | 8.41% | 399,975 |

==== Counties that flipped from Republican to Democratic ====
- Ashland
- Brown
- Chippewa
- Columbia
- Crawford
- Dane
- Fond du Lac
- Forest
- Grant
- Green
- Green Lake
- Iowa
- La Crosse
- Kenosha
- Lafayette
- Lincoln
- Marathon
- Manitowoc
- Milwaukee
- Marquette
- Monroe
- Outagamie
- Langlade
- Portage
- Racine
- Sawyer
- Sauk
- Shawano
- Sheboygan
- St. Croix
- Taylor
- Vilas
- Walworth
- Waukesha
- Winnebago
- Wood

==== Counties that flipped from Republican to Progressive ====
- Bayfield
- Burnett
- Douglas
- Pierce
- Polk
- Washburn

== See also ==
- United States presidential elections in Wisconsin
