= Elections in Wisconsin =

United States presidential election results for Wisconsin
Year	Republican / Whig		Democratic		Third party(ies)	
Year	No.	%	No.	%	No.	%
1848	13,747	35.10%	15,001	38.30%	10,418	26.60%
1852	22,210	34.34%	33,658	52.04%	8,814	13.63%
1856	66,090	55.30%	52,843	44.22%	579	0.48%
1860	86,113	56.59%	65,021	42.73%	1,049	0.69%
1864	83,458	55.88%	65,884	44.12%	0	0.00%
1868	108,900	56.25%	84,703	43.75%	0	0.00%
1872	104,994	54.60%	86,477	44.97%	834	0.43%
1876	130,067	50.57%	123,926	48.19%	3,184	1.24%
1880	144,398	54.04%	114,644	42.91%	8,145	3.05%
1884	161,135	50.38%	146,453	45.79%	12,247	3.83%
1888	176,553	49.79%	155,232	43.77%	22,829	6.44%
1892	171,101	46.05%	177,325	47.72%	23,155	6.23%
1896	268,135	59.93%	165,523	37.00%	13,751	3.07%
1900	265,760	60.06%	159,163	35.97%	17,578	3.97%
1904	280,315	63.21%	124,205	28.01%	38,921	8.78%
1908	247,747	54.52%	166,662	36.67%	40,032	8.81%
1912	130,596	32.65%	164,230	41.06%	105,149	26.29%
1916	220,822	49.39%	191,363	42.80%	34,949	7.82%
1920	498,576	71.10%	113,422	16.17%	89,282	12.73%
1924	311,614	37.06%	68,115	8.10%	461,097	54.84%
1928	544,205	53.52%	450,259	44.28%	22,367	2.20%
1932	347,741	31.19%	707,410	63.46%	59,657	5.35%
1936	380,828	30.26%	802,984	63.80%	74,748	5.94%
1940	679,206	48.32%	704,821	50.15%	21,495	1.53%
1944	674,532	50.37%	650,413	48.57%	14,207	1.06%
1948	590,959	46.28%	647,310	50.70%	38,531	3.02%
1952	979,744	60.95%	622,175	38.71%	5,451	0.34%
1956	954,844	61.58%	586,768	37.84%	8,946	0.58%
1960	895,175	51.77%	830,805	48.05%	3,102	0.18%
1964	638,495	37.74%	1,050,424	62.09%	2,896	0.17%
1968	809,997	47.89%	748,804	44.27%	132,737	7.85%
1972	989,430	53.40%	810,174	43.72%	53,286	2.88%
1976	1,004,987	47.83%	1,040,232	49.50%	56,117	2.67%
1980	1,088,845	47.90%	981,584	43.18%	202,792	8.92%
1984	1,198,800	54.19%	995,847	45.02%	17,369	0.79%
1988	1,047,499	47.80%	1,126,794	51.41%	17,315	0.79%
1992	930,855	36.78%	1,041,066	41.13%	559,193	22.09%
1996	845,029	38.48%	1,071,971	48.81%	279,169	12.71%
2000	1,237,279	47.61%	1,242,987	47.83%	118,341	4.55%
2004	1,478,120	49.32%	1,489,504	49.70%	29,383	0.98%
2008	1,262,393	42.31%	1,677,211	56.22%	43,813	1.47%
2012	1,407,966	45.89%	1,620,985	52.83%	39,483	1.29%
2016	1,405,284	47.22%	1,382,536	46.45%	188,330	6.33%
2020	1,610,184	48.82%	1,630,866	49.45%	56,991	1.73%
2024	1,697,626	49.60%	1,668,229	48.74%	57,063	1.67%

Elections in Wisconsin are held to fill various local, state, and federal seats. Special elections may be held to fill vacancies at other points in time.

In a 2020 study, Wisconsin was ranked as the 25th easiest state for citizens to vote in.

== History ==
=== Pre-1960s ===
Apart from its first two presidential elections as a state, Wisconsin was heavily Republican throughout the entirety of the late 1800s and into the early 1900s - voting Democratic in presidential elections only 1892, 1912, 1948, and for Franklin D. Roosevelt from 1856 to 1960.

=== 1960-1999 ===
Wisconsin still held somewhat of a red tilt leading into the 1960 presidential election - but the election's result was still somewhat close, Richard Nixon (Republican) only winning over John F. Kennedy (Democrat) by 3.72 percent. The 1960s, however showed a major change is Wisconsin politics - the state turned heavily towards Democrats during the decade. Democrats won large victories in the 1962 elections, particularly in ousting an incumbent Republican senator and keeping its Democratic governor. In 1964, Lyndon B. Johnson (Democrat) won a large victory over Republican Barry Goldwater - winning 62% of the vote and 69 out of 72 of Wisconsin's counties. Wisconsin did flip back to Republicans in the 1968 and the 1972 Republican landslide presidential election, but much closer margins than Republicans had historically achieved. In 1976, Carter (Democrat) carried the state by a small margin, and Reagan (Republican) in 1980 similarly flipped it back by a small margin. In 1984, Reagan 49-state re-election landslide, Wisconsin voted for him. In 1988 - it turned Democrat for Michael Dukakis, marking the beginning of a 24-year streak of voting for Democrats in presidential elections.

=== 21st Century ===
Wisconsin's presidential election in 2024 by county. Colors range on a spectrum from Democratic blue to Republican red.

After turning towards the Democrats in the 1980s and 1990s, Wisconsin's elections drastically narrowed in 2000 and 2004 - though it stayed with the Democratic candidates, in neither election did the Democratic candidate win by more than one percent of the vote. Democrats did perform better in Wisconsin with Obama - he received 56.2 and 52.8 percent of the vote in 2008 and 2012 respectively. That said, Republicans made large gains in Wisconsin throughout the early 2010s. Ron Johnson, a Republican, was elected as a senator and remains in office to this day - and the United States members House of Representatives from Wisconsin have been majority Republican since then as well. In addition, Wisconsin elected Governor Scott Walker in 2010 - a Republican. In the 2016 presidential election, Wisconsin flipped Republican and voted for Donald Trump over Hillary Clinton by a close margin - meaning that Wisconsin was still a swing state on the presidential level. Democrats had positive elections there in 2018, re-electing a Democratic Senator, and electing Tony Evers, a Democrat, to the governorship - but Republicans still held on to the House of Representatives from Wisconsin and the state legislature. In 2020, the state held one of the closest presidential elections in the country - it flipped Democratic for Biden by less than a percent. In 2022, Republican Senator Johnson and Democratic Governor Evers were simultaneously re-elected, again showing the state's close political status. Wisconsin as of today is one of the nation's most contested swing states, having flipped Republican again with the country's closest margin between Democrats and Republican -at 0,9%- during the 2024 presidential election.

== Presidential ==
- United States presidential election in Wisconsin, 1980
- United States presidential election in Wisconsin, 1984
- United States presidential election in Wisconsin, 1988
- United States presidential election in Wisconsin, 1992
- United States presidential election in Wisconsin, 1996
- United States presidential election in Wisconsin, 2000
- United States presidential election in Wisconsin, 2004
- United States presidential election in Wisconsin, 2008
  - Wisconsin Democratic primary, 2008
  - Wisconsin Republican primary, 2008
- United States presidential election in Wisconsin, 2012
  - Wisconsin Republican primary, 2012
- United States presidential election in Wisconsin, 2016
- 2020 United States presidential election in Wisconsin

== Congressional ==
=== U.S. Senate ===
- United States Senate election in Wisconsin, 2012

=== U.S. House of Representatives ===
- United States House of Representatives elections in Wisconsin, 2008
- United States House of Representatives elections in Wisconsin, 2012
- 2020 United States House of Representatives elections in Wisconsin

== State executive ==
- 2022 gubernatorial election
- 2018 gubernatorial election
- 2014 gubernatorial election
- 2012 gubernatorial recall election
- 2010 gubernatorial election
- 2006 gubernatorial election
- Wisconsin gubernatorial election, 1998 and previous years

== State legislative ==
- Wisconsin state elections, 2008
- 2020 Wisconsin elections

== See also ==
- 2026 Wisconsin elections
- Political party strength in Wisconsin
- Recall elections in Wisconsin
- Election Administration agencies
  - Wisconsin Government Accountability Board
  - Wisconsin Elections Commission
- Women's suffrage in Wisconsin
- List of Wisconsin state legislatures
