= United States presidential elections in Wisconsin =

Presidential elections in Wisconsin
- Number of elections: 45
- Voted Democratic: 18
- Voted Republican: 26
- Voted other: 1 (Note: Robert La Follette Sr., 1924)
- Voted for winning candidate: 34
- Voted for losing candidate: 10

Since Wisconsin's admission to the Union in May 1848, it has participated in 44 U.S. presidential elections. In 1924, Robert M. La Follette became the only third-party presidential candidate to win in Wisconsin, taking 53.96% of the popular vote. Since 2016, Wisconsin has transitioned into a swing state, although Republican Donald Trump won the state by a margin of 0.77 percentage points. Wisconsin is tied with Michigan and Pennsylvania for the longest active streak of voting for the winning candidate since 2008, last voting for a losing candidate in 2004 when they backed John Kerry.

In the 2020 presidential election, Democrat Joe Biden won Wisconsin, defeating Trump by 0.62 percentage points. During the 2021 United States Electoral College vote count, 36 members of the House of Representatives objected to the certification of Wisconsin's electoral votes because of unsubstantiated claims of election fraud, but the objection failed because it was not joined by a senator.

In the 2024 presidential election, Republican candidate Donald Trump won Wisconsin by 0.87 percentage points over Kamala Harris.

== Elections ==
Key for parties
American Independent Party – (AI)
American Party (1969) – (A)
Constitution Party – (C)
Constitutional Union Party – (CU)
Democratic Party – (D)
Free Soil Party – (FS)
Green Party – (G)
Greenback Party – (GB)
Independent candidate – (I)
Know Nothing Party – (KN)
Libertarian Party – (LI)
Progressive Party (1912) – (PR-1912)
Progressive Party (1924) – (PR-1924)
Progressive Party (1948) – (PR-1948)
Prohibition Party – (PRO)
Reform Party – (RE)
Republican Party – (R)
Socialist Party – (S)
Southern Democratic Party – (SD)
Straight-Out Democratic Party – (SOD)
Whig Party – (W)
Union Party – (U)
Note – A double dagger (‡) indicates the national winner.

=== 1848 to 1856 ===
Presidential elections in Wisconsin from 1848 to 1856
Year	Winner			Runner-up			Other candidate (Note: For purposes of these lists, other candidates are defined as those who were in third place in Wisconsin)			EV	Ref.
Year	Candidate	Votes	%	Candidate	Votes	%	Candidate	Votes	%	EV	Ref.
1848	Lewis Cass (D)	15,001	38.30%	Zachary Taylor (W) ‡	13,747	35.10%	Martin Van Buren (FS)	10,418	26.60%	4	
1852	Franklin Pierce (D) ‡	33,658	51.99%	Winfield Scott (W)	22,240	34.35%	John P. Hale (FS)	8,842	13.66%	5	
1856	John C. Frémont (R)	67,090	55.67%	James Buchanan (D) ‡	52,843	43.85%	Millard Fillmore (KN)	580	0.48%	5	

=== Election of 1860 ===
The election of 1860 was a complex realigning election in which the breakdown of the previous two-party alignment culminated in four parties each competing for influence in different parts of the country. The result of the election, with the victory of an ardent opponent of slavery, spurred the secession of eleven states and brought about the American Civil War.

1860 presidential election in Wisconsin
Year	Winner		Runner-up		Other candidate		Other candidate		EV	Ref.
Year	Candidate	Votes (%)	Candidate	Votes (%)	Candidate	Votes (%)	Candidate	Votes (%)	EV	Ref.
1860	Abraham Lincoln (R) ‡	86,110 (56.58%)	Stephen A. Douglas (D)	65,021 (42.73%)	John C. Breckinridge (SD)	887 (0.58%)	John Bell (CU)	161 (0.11%)	5	

=== 1864 to present ===
Presidential elections in Wisconsin from 1864 to present
Year	Winner			Runner-up			Other candidate			EV	Ref.
Year	Candidate	Votes	%	Candidate	Votes	%	Candidate	Votes	%	EV	Ref.
1864	Abraham Lincoln (R) ‡	83,458	55.88%	George B. McClellan (D)	65,884	44.12%	–	–	–	8	
1868	Ulysses S. Grant (R) ‡	108,920	56.25%	Horatio Seymour (D)	84,708	43.75%	–	–	–	8	
1872	Ulysses S. Grant (R) ‡	105,012	54.62%	Horace Greeley (D)	86,390	44.94%	Charles O'Conor (SOD)	853	0.44%	10	
1876	Rutherford B. Hayes (R) ‡	130,668	50.69%	Samuel Tilden (D)	123,927	48.07%	Peter Cooper (GB)	1,509	0.59%	10	
1880	James A. Garfield (R) ‡	144,406	54.04%	Winfield S. Hancock (D)	114,650	42.91%	James B. Weaver (GB)	7,986	2.99%	10	
1884	James G. Blaine (R)	161,155	50.39%	Grover Cleveland (D) ‡	146,447	45.79%	John P. St. John (PRO)	7,651	2.39%	11	
1888	Benjamin Harrison (R) ‡	176,553	49.79%	Grover Cleveland (D)	155,232	43.77%	Clinton B. Fisk (PRO)	14,277	4.03%	11	
1892	Grover Cleveland (D) ‡	177,325	47.73%	Benjamin Harrison (R)	171,101	46.06%	John Bidwell (PRO)	13,136	3.54%	12	
1896	William McKinley (R) ‡	268,135	59.93%	William Jennings Bryan (D)	165,523	37.00%	Joshua Levering (PRO)	7,507	1.68%	12	
1900	William McKinley (R) ‡	265,760	60.06%	William Jennings Bryan (D)	159,163	35.97%	John G. Woolley (PRO)	10,027	2.27%	12	
1904	Theodore Roosevelt (R) ‡	280,314	63.21%	Alton B. Parker (D)	124,205	28.01%	Eugene V. Debs (S)	28,240	6.37%	13	
1908	William Howard Taft (R) ‡	247,744	54.52%	William Jennings Bryan (D)	166,662	36.67%	Eugene V. Debs (S)	28,147	6.19%	13	
1912	Woodrow Wilson (D) ‡	164,230	41.06%	William Howard Taft (R)	130,596	32.65%	Theodore Roosevelt (PR-1912)	62,448	15.61%	13	
1916	Charles E. Hughes (R)	220,822	49.39%	Woodrow Wilson (D) ‡	191,363	42.80%	Allan L. Benson (S)	27,631	6.18%	13	
1920	Warren G. Harding (R) ‡	498,576	71.10%	James M. Cox (D)	113,422	16.17%	Eugene V. Debs (S)	80,635	11.50%	13	
1924	Robert LaFollette (PR-1924)	453,678	53.96%	Calvin Coolidge (R) ‡	311,614	37.06%	John W. Davis (D)	68,115	8.10%	13	
1928	Herbert Hoover (R) ‡	544,205	53.52%	Alfred E. Smith (D)	450,259	44.28%	Norman M. Thomas (S)	18,213	1.79%	13	
1932	Franklin D. Roosevelt (D) ‡	707,410	63.46%	Herbert Hoover (R)	347,741	31.19%	Norman M. Thomas (S)	53,379	4.79%	12	
1936	Franklin D. Roosevelt (D) ‡	802,984	63.80%	Alfred Landon (R)	380,828	30.26%	William Lemke (Union)	60,297	4.79%	12	
1940	Franklin D. Roosevelt (D) ‡	704,821	50.15%	Wendell L. Willkie (R)	679,206	48.32%	Norman M. Thomas (S)	15,071	1.07%	12	
1944	Thomas E. Dewey (R)	674,532	50.37%	Franklin D. Roosevelt (D) ‡	650,413	48.57%	Norman M. Thomas (S)	13,205	0.99%	12	
1948	Harry S. Truman (D) ‡	647,310	50.70%	Thomas E. Dewey (R)	590,959	46.28%	Henry A. Wallace (PR-1948)	25,282	1.98%	12	
1952	Dwight D. Eisenhower (R) ‡	979,744	60.95%	Adlai Stevenson (D)	622,175	38.71%	Vincent Hallinan (PR-1948)	2,174	0.14%	12	
1956	Dwight D. Eisenhower (R) ‡	954,844	61.58%	Adlai Stevenson (D)	586,768	37.84%	T. Coleman Andrews (C)	6,918	0.45%	12	
1960	Richard M. Nixon (R)	895,175	51.77%	John F. Kennedy (D) ‡	830,805	48.05%	Farrell Dobbs (SWP)	1,792	0.10%	12	
1964	Lyndon B. Johnson (D) ‡	1,050,424	62.09%	Barry Goldwater (R)	638,495	37.74%	Clifton DeBerry (SWP)	1,692	0.10%	12	
1968	Richard M. Nixon (R) ‡	809,997	47.89%	Hubert Humphrey (D)	748,804	44.27%	George Wallace (AI)	127,835	7.56%	12	
1972	Richard M. Nixon (R) ‡	989,430	53.40%	George McGovern (D)	810,174	43.72%	John G. Schmitz (A)	47,525	2.56%	11	
1976	Jimmy Carter (D) ‡	1,040,232	49.44%	Gerald R. Ford (R)	1,004,987	47.76%	Eugene J. McCarthy (I)	34,943	1.66%	11	
1980	Ronald Reagan (R) ‡	1,088,845	47.90%	Jimmy Carter (D)	981,584	43.18%	John B. Anderson (I)	160,657	7.07%	11	
1984	Ronald Reagan (R) ‡	1,198,584	54.19%	Walter Mondale (D)	995,740	45.02%	David Bergland (LI)	4,883	0.22%	11	
1988	Michael Dukakis (D)	1,126,794	51.41%	George H. W. Bush (R) ‡	1,047,499	47.80%	Ron Paul (LI)	5,157	0.24%	11	
1992	Bill Clinton (D) ‡	1,041,066	41.13%	George H. W. Bush (R)	930,855	36.78%	Ross Perot (I)	544,479	21.51%	11	
1996	Bill Clinton (D) ‡	1,071,971	48.81%	Bob Dole (R)	845,029	38.48%	Ross Perot (RE)	227,339	10.35%	11	
2000	Al Gore (D)	1,242,987	47.83%	George W. Bush (R) ‡	1,237,279	47.61%	Ralph Nader (G)	94,070	3.62%	11	
2004	John Kerry (D)	1,489,504	49.70%	George W. Bush (R) ‡	1,478,120	49.32%	Ralph Nader (RE)	16,390	0.55%	10	
2008	Barack Obama (D) ‡	1,677,211	56.22%	John McCain (R)	1,262,393	42.31%	Ralph Nader (I)	17,605	0.59%	10	
2012	Barack Obama (D) ‡	1,620,985	52.83%	Mitt Romney (R)	1,407,966	45.89%	Gary Johnson (I)	20,439	0.67%	10	
2016	Donald Trump (R) ‡	1,405,284	47.22%	Hillary Clinton (D)	1,382,536	46.45%	Gary Johnson (LI)	106,674	3.58%	10	
2020	Joe Biden (D) ‡	1,630,866	49.45%	Donald Trump (R)	1,610,184	48.82%	Jo Jorgensen (LI)	38,491	1.17%	10	
2024	Donald Trump (R) ‡	1,697,626	49.60%	Kamala Harris (D)	1,668,229	48.74%	Robert F. Kennedy Jr. (I)	17,740	0.52%	10	

=== Graph ===
View source data.

== See also ==
- Elections in Wisconsin
- List of United States presidential election results by state

== Works cited ==
- Guide to U.S. Elections. SAGE Publications. 2010. ISBN 978-1-60426-536-1.
- 1997–1998 Wisconsin Blue Book. Wisconsin Legislative Reference Bureau. 1997.
- Presidential elections, 1789–1996. Congressional Quarterly. 1997. ISBN 9781568020655. LCCN 97019084. OL 673017M.
