= 1888 United States presidential election in Wisconsin =

- November 6, 1888
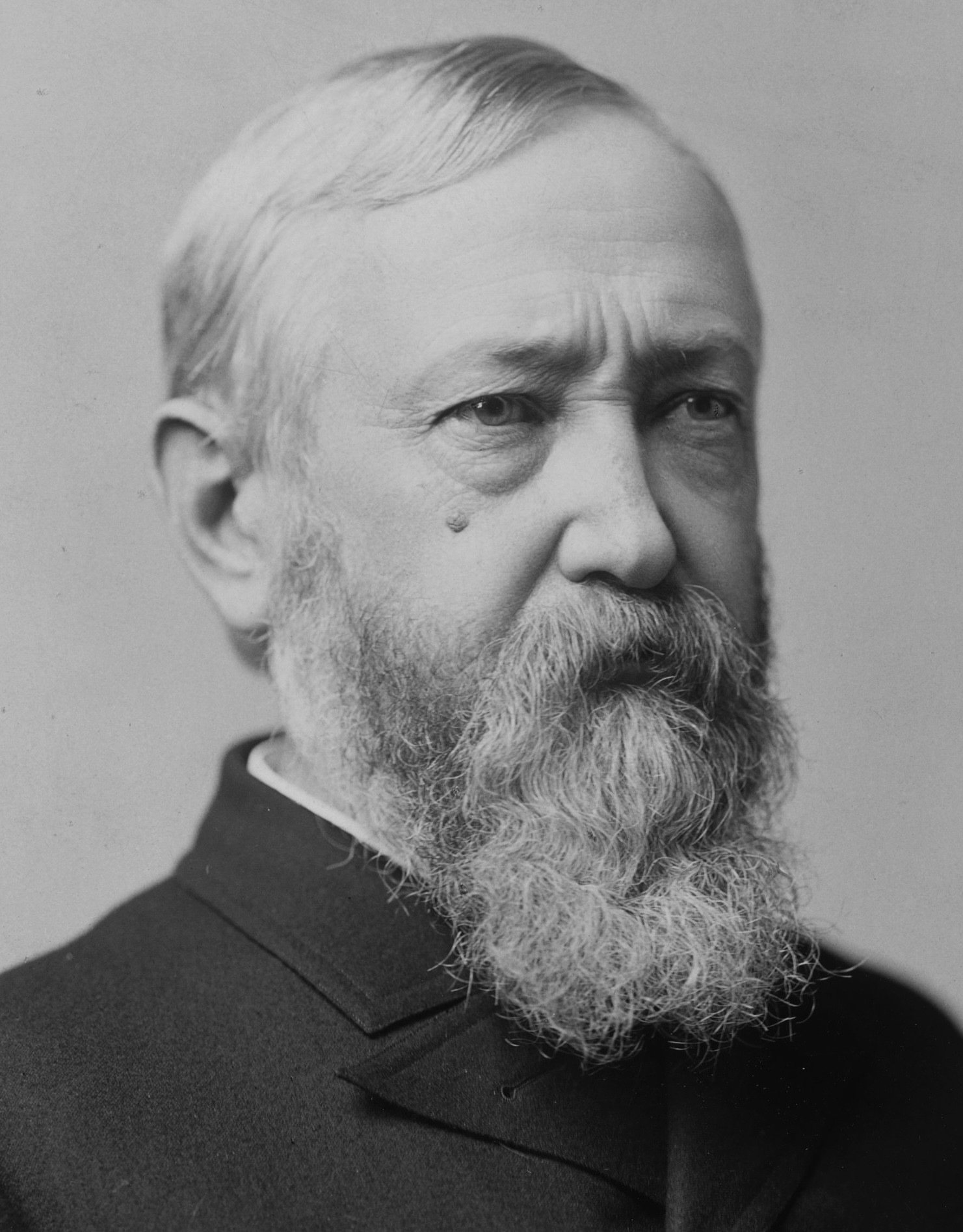

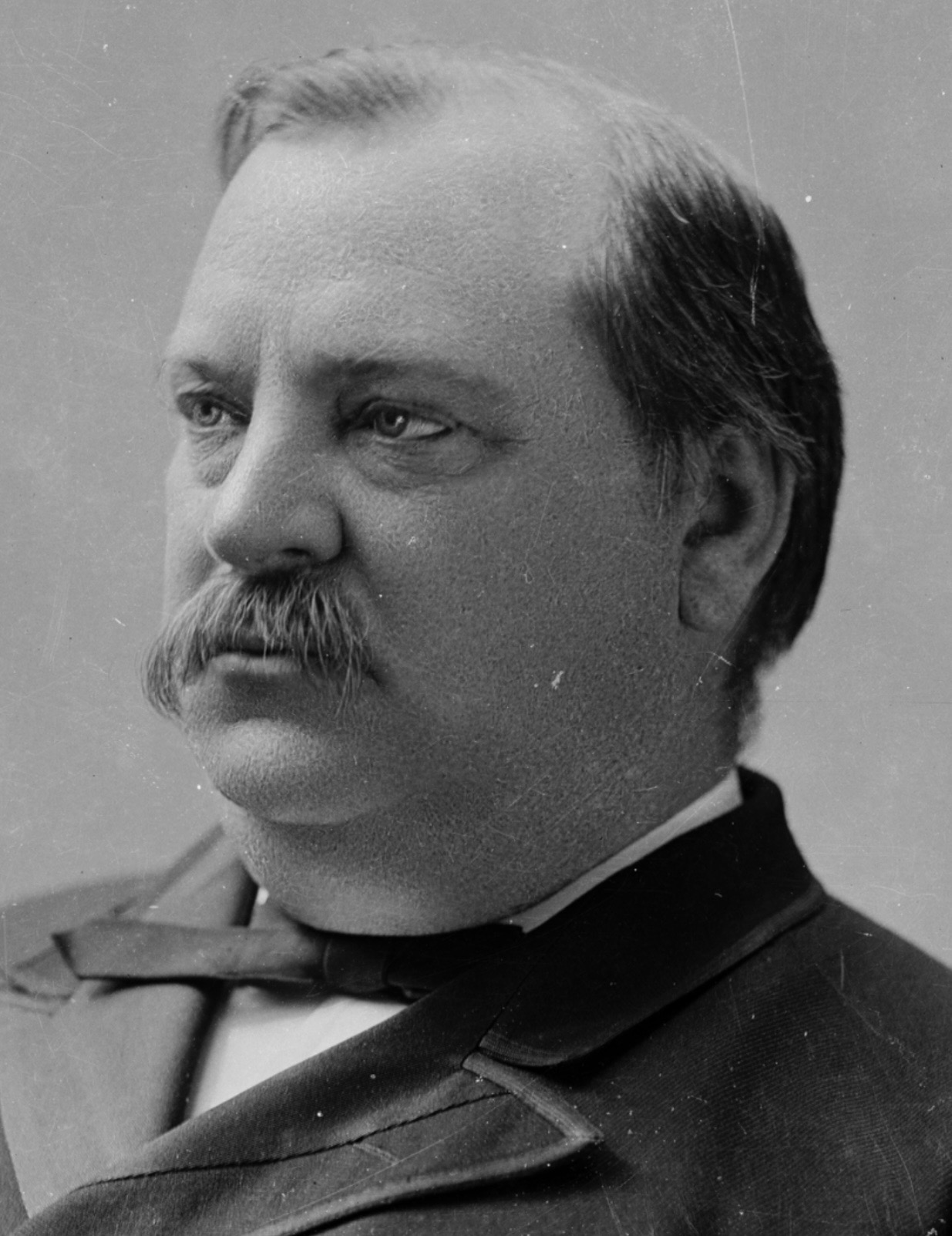
Nominee	Benjamin Harrison	Grover Cleveland
Party	Republican	Democratic
Home state	Indiana	New York
Running mate	Levi P. Morton	Allen G. Thurman
Electoral vote	11	0
Popular vote	176,555	155,243
Percentage	49.69%	43.69%
County results
Harrison
40–50%
50–60%
60–70%
70–80%
Cleveland
40–50%
50–60%
60–70%
70–80%
President before election
Grover Cleveland
Democratic
Elected President
Benjamin Harrison
Republican

The 1888 United States presidential election in Wisconsin was held on November 6, 1888, as part of the 1888 United States presidential election. State voters chose 11 electors to the Electoral College, who voted for president and vice president.

Republican Party candidate Benjamin Harrison won Wisconsin with 49.69% of the popular vote, winning the state's eleven electoral votes. Wisconsin voted Republican for the ninth consecutive election; this streak would end with the next election.

In this election, Marquette County began a streak of voting for the statewide winner that lasted until 1936.

== Results ==
General Election Results (Note: The 1889 Blue Book gives the totals as Harrison 176,553; Cleveland 155,232; Fisk 14,277; Streeter 8,5552; and no Scattering. These totals correspond to the first elector listed on the canvass for each ticket, but not the highest elector on each ticket.)
Party	Pledged to	Elector	Votes
Republican Party	Benjamin Harrison	A. C. Dodge	176,555
Republican Party	Benjamin Harrison	Currie G. Bell	176,553
Republican Party	Benjamin Harrison	Lucius Fairchild	176,553
Republican Party	Benjamin Harrison	Oscar F. Temple	176,553
Republican Party	Benjamin Harrison	Syver E. Brimi	176,552
Republican Party	Benjamin Harrison	John Ruch	176,552
Republican Party	Benjamin Harrison	Albert F. Hill	176,551
Republican Party	Benjamin Harrison	Allen P. Harwood	176,548
Republican Party	Benjamin Harrison	Julius Goldschmidt	176,548
Republican Party	Benjamin Harrison	C. N. Palmer	176,513
Republican Party	Benjamin Harrison	John Finney	176,459
Democratic Party	Grover Cleveland	George J. Obermann	155,243
Democratic Party	Grover Cleveland	Henry M. Ackley	155,241
Democratic Party	Grover Cleveland	Cyrus M. Butt	155,241
Democratic Party	Grover Cleveland	John W. Bashford	155,240
Democratic Party	Grover Cleveland	William P. Bragg	155,240
Democratic Party	Grover Cleveland	John Franz	155,240
Democratic Party	Grover Cleveland	Joseph H. Martson	155,240
Democratic Party	Grover Cleveland	John Winans	155,239
Democratic Party	Grover Cleveland	Nelson Dewey	155,232
Democratic Party	Grover Cleveland	Thomas Thompson	155,231
Democratic Party	Grover Cleveland	David Jennings	155,177
Prohibition Party	Clinton B. Fisk	G. D. Ball	14,415
Prohibition Party	Clinton B. Fisk	T. J. Palchen	14,413
Prohibition Party	Clinton B. Fisk	W. Larson	14,412
Prohibition Party	Clinton B. Fisk	W. G. Boorman	14,411
Prohibition Party	Clinton B. Fisk	F. W. Cole	14,411
Prohibition Party	Clinton B. Fisk	D. P. Simmons	14,372
Prohibition Party	Clinton B. Fisk	Joseph S. Wilson	14,351
Prohibition Party	Clinton B. Fisk	B. F. Parker	14,277
Prohibition Party	Clinton B. Fisk	Charles Alexander	14,261
Prohibition Party	Clinton B. Fisk	J. C. Plumb	14,115
Prohibition Party	Clinton B. Fisk	J. H. Peoberthy	14,107
Union Labor Party	Alson Streeter	George Geb	8,561
Union Labor Party	Alson Streeter	Clark Hewitt	8,560
Union Labor Party	Alson Streeter	Charles Kealeh	8,560
Union Labor Party	Alson Streeter	L. L. Stuliff	8,558
Union Labor Party	Alson Streeter	Anson B. Severence	8,552
Union Labor Party	Alson Streeter	John Ponnery	8,550
Union Labor Party	Alson Streeter	Isaac Crawford	8,500
Union Labor Party	Alson Streeter	John G. Reidel	8,497
Union Labor Party	Alson Streeter	Aulin M. Munnes	8,466
Union Labor Party	Alson Streeter	Norris Pierce	5,997
Union Labor Party	Alson Streeter	Otto Gallum	5,921
Union Labor Party	Alson Streeter	William C. Powell (Note: Appears to have replaced Gallum or Pierce on some Union Labor ballots, although there are clear instances where some Union Labor ballots had other combinations as well.)	2,697
Union Labor Party	Alson Streeter	Nathan E. Moody	2,634
Write-in		L. L. Lansing	300
Write-in		Nelson La Due	239
Write-in		Christian Carlson	24
Write-in		C. E. Cunningham	1
Votes cast (Note: Based on totals for highest elector on each ticket)			355,338

=== Results by county ===
County	Benjamin Harrison Republican		Grover Cleveland Democratic		Clinton B. Fisk Prohibition		Alson Streeter Union Labor		Margin		Total votes cast (Note: Based on highest elector on each ticket)
County	#	%	#	%	#	%	#	%	#	%	Total votes cast
Adams	1,102	71.14%	426	27.50%	16	1.03%	5	0.32%	676	43.64%	1,549
Ashland	2,868	55.64%	2,233	43.32%	54	1.05%	0	0.00%	635	12.32%	5,155
Barron	1,800	60.52%	885	29.76%	283	9.52%	6	0.20%	915	30.77%	2,974
Bayfield	1,205	62.11%	708	36.49%	27	1.39%	0	0.00%	497	25.62%	1,940
Brown	2,655	41.23%	3,556	55.22%	133	2.07%	96	1.49%	-901	-13.99%	6,440
Buffalo	1,755	54.42%	1,331	41.27%	88	2.73%	1	0.03%	424	13.15%	3,225 (Note: Includes 50 Scattering votes)
Burnett	490	62.10%	69	8.75%	230	29.15%	0	0.00%	260 (Note: Harrison's margin over Fisk)	32.95%	789
Calumet	952	30.47%	1,984	63.51%	46	1.47%	142	4.55%	-1,032	-33.03%	3,124
Chippewa	2,685	49.05%	2,506	45.78%	283	5.17%	0	0.00%	179	3.27%	5,474
Clark	2,260	60.64%	1,297	34.80%	148	3.97%	22	0.59%	963	25.84%	3,727
Columbia	3,509	53.45%	2,650	40.37%	393	5.99%	13	0.20%	859	13.08%	6,565
Crawford	1,799	51.89%	1,564	45.11%	62	1.79%	42	1.21%	235	6.78%	3,467
Dane	6,828	47.60%	6,426	44.80%	1,082	7.54%	9	0.06%	402	2.80%	14,345
Dodge	3,187	33.60%	6,046	63.74%	212	2.24%	40	0.42%	-2,859	-30.14%	9,485
Door	1,688	61.07%	1,018	36.83%	55	1.99%	2	0.07%	670	24.24%	2,764 (Note: Includes 1 Scattering vote)
Douglas	1,183	59.66%	778	39.23%	19	0.96%	3	0.15%	405	20.42%	1,983
Dunn	2,531	54.41%	1,299	27.92%	277	5.95%	91	1.96%	1,232	26.48%	4,652 (Note: Includes 454 Scattering votes)
Eau Claire	3,203	51.08%	2,412	38.47%	493	7.86%	162	2.58%	791	12.62%	6,270
Florence	321	57.12%	227	40.39%	3	0.53%	11	1.96%	94	16.73%	562
Fond du Lac	4,511	45.94%	4,910	50.01%	297	3.02%	101	1.03%	-399	-4.06%	9,819
Forest	234	50.87%	217	47.17%	9	1.96%	0	0.00%	17	3.70%	460
Grant	4,242	51.74%	3,413	41.63%	449	5.48%	94	1.15%	829	10.11%	8,198
Green	2,660	49.12%	2,098	38.74%	440	8.13%	217	4.01%	562	10.38%	5,415
Green Lake	1,702	52.42%	1,415	43.58%	125	3.85%	5	0.15%	287	8.84%	3,247
Iowa	2,483	47.73%	2,257	43.39%	462	8.88%	0	0.00%	226	4.34%	5,202
Jackson	2,090	62.57%	995	29.79%	255	7.63%	0	0.00%	1,095	32.78%	3,340
Jefferson	2,993	39.94%	4,282	57.15%	205	2.74%	13	0.17%	-1,289	-17.20%	7,493
Juneau	2,067	52.64%	1,666	42.42%	183	4.66%	11	0.28%	401	10.21%	3,927
Kenosha	1,684	48.56%	1,681	48.47%	102	2.94%	1	0.03%	3	0.09%	3,468
Kewaunee	849	29.01%	2,077	70.96%	1	0.03%	0	0.00%	-1,228	-41.95%	2,927
La Crosse	4,128	48.25%	3,901	45.59%	394	4.60%	133	1.55%	227	2.65%	8,556
Lafayette	2,564	50.16%	2,275	44.50%	268	5.24%	5	0.10%	289	5.65%	5,112
Langlade	774	37.54%	1,192	57.81%	96	4.66%	0	0.00%	-418	-20.27%	2,062
Lincoln	1,137	47.59%	1,032	43.20%	107	4.48%	113	4.73%	105	4.40%	2,389
Manitowoc	2,703	38.25%	4,218	59.69%	19	0.27%	127	1.80%	-1,515	-21.44%	7,067
Marathon	2,122	36.38%	3,365	57.69%	42	0.72%	304	5.21%	-1,243	-21.31%	5,833
Marinette	1,775	45.59%	1,767	45.39%	224	5.75%	127	3.26%	8	0.21%	3,893
Marquette	1,119	51.95%	1,005	46.66%	26	1.21%	4	0.19%	114	5.29%	2,154
Milwaukee	21,393	49.14%	17,305	39.75%	339	0.78%	4,495	10.33%	4,088	9.39%	43,532
Monroe	2,695	52.85%	2,138	41.93%	266	5.22%	0	0.00%	557	10.92%	5,099
Oconto	1,315	52.45%	1,148	45.79%	37	1.48%	7	0.28%	167	6.66%	2,507
Oneida	771	46.87%	868	52.77%	6	0.36%	0	0.00%	-97	-5.90%	1,645
Outagamie	2,759	39.05%	4,000	56.61%	187	2.65%	120	1.70%	-1,241	-17.56%	7,066
Ozaukee	750	26.18%	2,025	70.68%	4	0.14%	86	3.00%	-1,275	-44.50%	2,865
Pepin	926	59.28%	461	29.51%	175	11.20%	0	0.00%	465	29.77%	1,562
Pierce	2,477	58.65%	1,158	27.42%	542	12.83%	46	1.09%	1,319	31.23%	4,223
Polk	1,703	63.88%	631	23.67%	332	12.45%	0	0.00%	1,072	40.21%	2,666
Portage	2,603	50.90%	2,322	45.40%	167	3.27%	22	0.43%	281	5.49%	5,114
Price	914	55.94%	619	37.88%	101	6.18%	0	0.00%	295	18.05%	1,634
Racine	3,947	49.37%	3,325	41.59%	440	5.50%	283	3.54%	622	7.78%	7,995
Richland	2,467	54.58%	1,740	38.50%	292	6.46%	21	0.46%	727	16.08%	4,520
Rock	6,225	60.93%	3,501	34.27%	478	4.68%	13	0.13%	2,724	26.66%	10,217
Sauk	3,410	51.44%	2,648	39.95%	539	8.13%	32	0.48%	762	11.49%	6,629
Sawyer	542	51.28%	511	48.34%	1	0.09%	0	0.00%	31	2.93%	1,057 (Note: Includes 3 Scattering votes)
Shawano	1,775	51.23%	1,636	47.22%	31	0.89%	23	0.66%	139	4.01%	3,465
Sheboygan	3,729	43.49%	4,320	50.38%	76	0.89%	449	5.24%	-591	-6.89%	8,574
St. Croix	2,759	50.47%	2,130	38.96%	529	9.68%	49	0.90%	629	11.51%	5,467
Taylor	792	51.90%	719	47.12%	15	0.98%	0	0.00%	73	4.78%	1,526
Trempealeau	2,261	55.58%	1,571	38.62%	236	5.80%	0	0.00%	690	16.96%	4,068
Vernon	3,316	64.15%	1,540	29.79%	268	5.18%	45	0.87%	1,776	34.36%	5,169
Walworth	4,473	62.50%	2,028	28.34%	563	7.87%	93	1.30%	2,445	34.16%	7,157
Washburn	514	49.47%	363	34.94%	106	10.20%	0	0.00%	151	14.53%	1,039 (Note: Includes 56 Scattering votes)
Washington	1,869	39.32%	2,872	60.42%	12	0.25%	0	0.00%	-1,003	-21.10%	4,753
Waukesha	3,839	50.35%	3,456	45.32%	297	3.90%	33	0.43%	383	5.02%	7,625
Waupaca	3,385	62.95%	1,769	32.90%	167	3.11%	56	1.04%	1,616	30.05%	5,377
Waushara	2,245	72.42%	663	21.39%	159	5.13%	33	1.06%	1,582	51.03%	3,100
Winnebago	4,939	46.45%	4,611	43.36%	401	3.77%	682	6.41%	328	3.08%	10,633
Wood	1,904	47.58%	1,984	49.58%	41	1.02%	73	1.82%	-80	-2.00%	4,002
Total	176,555	49.69%	155,243	43.69%	14,415	4.06%	8,561	2.41%	21,312	6.00%	355,338

==== Counties that flipped from Democratic to Republican ====
- Crawford
- Dane
- Marquette
- Shawano
- Waukesha

== See also ==
- United States presidential elections in Wisconsin
