= 1860 United States presidential election in Wisconsin =

- November 6, 1860
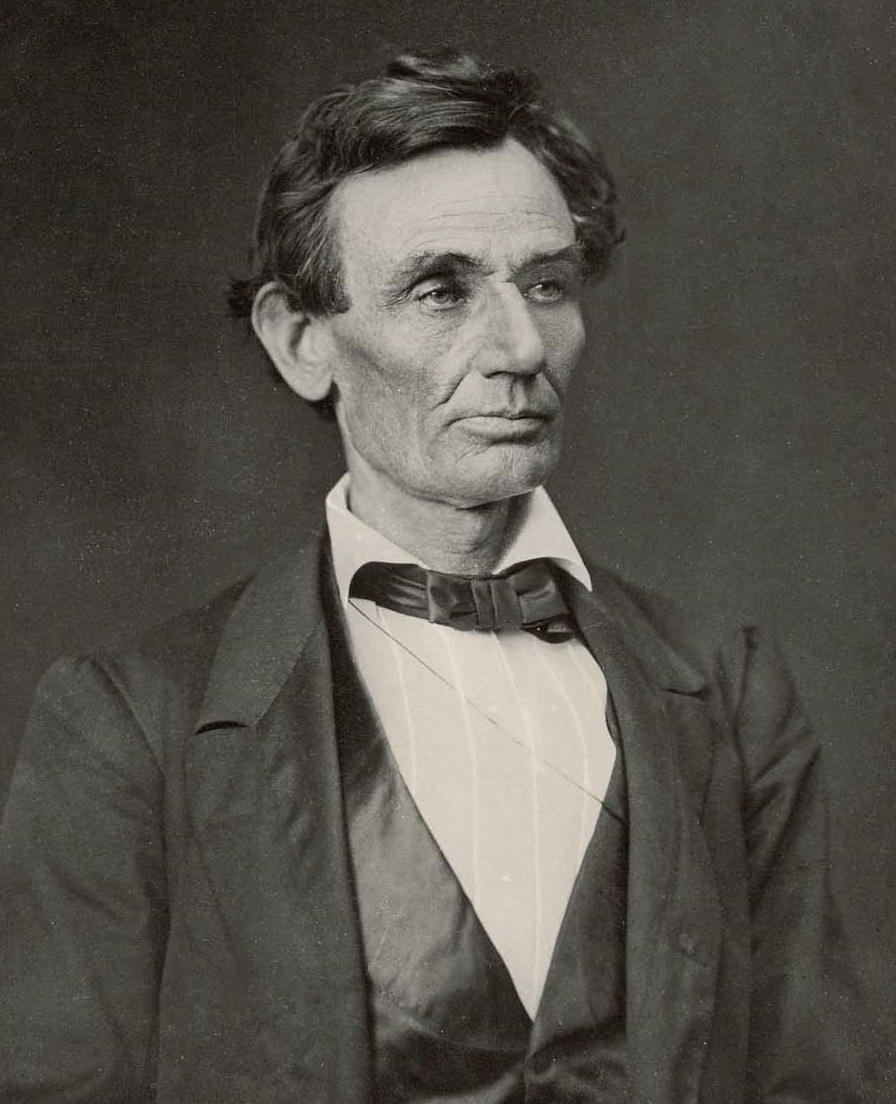

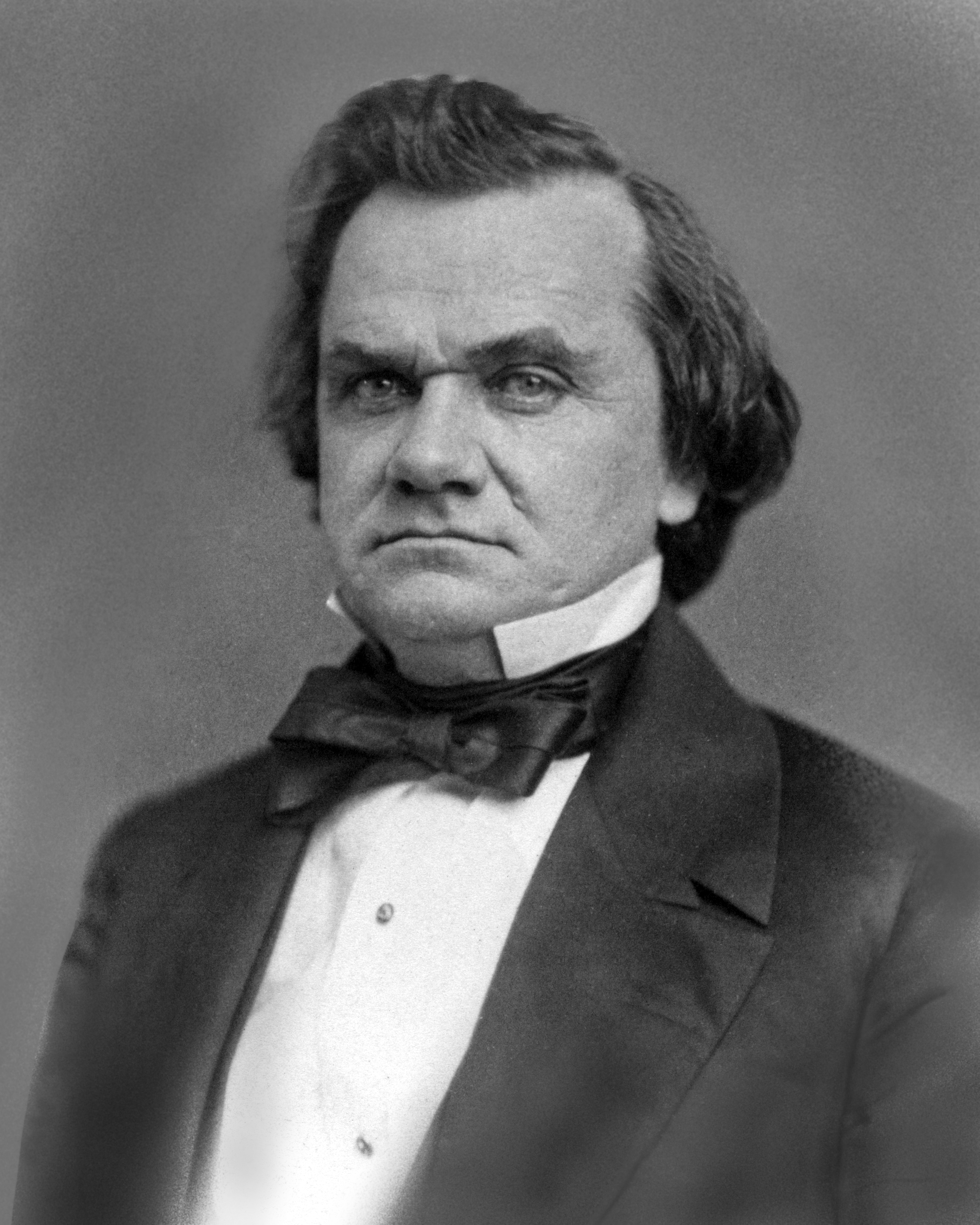
Nominee	Abraham Lincoln	Stephen A. Douglas
Party	Republican	Democratic
Home state	Illinois	Illinois
Running mate	Hannibal Hamlin	Herschel V. Johnson
Electoral vote	5	0
Popular vote	86,110	65,021
Percentage	56.56%	42.71%
County results
Lincoln
40–50%
50–60%
60–70%
70–80%
Douglas
40–50%
50–60%
60–70%
70–80%
President before election
James Buchanan
Democratic
Elected President
Abraham Lincoln
Republican

The 1860 United States presidential election in Wisconsin was held on November 6, 1860, as part of the 1860 United States presidential election. State voters chose five electors to the Electoral College, who voted for president and vice president.

Wisconsin was won by the Republican Party candidate Abraham Lincoln and his running mate Hannibal Hamlin. They defeated the Democratic Party candidate Stephen A. Douglas and his running mate Herschel V. Johnson. Lincoln won the state by a margin of 13.85%.

This was the last election until 1904 that Calumet County would vote for a Republican candidate. Additionally, Manitowoc County and Jefferson County would not vote Republican again until 1896. Green Lake County, established in 1858 and participating in its first presidential election, voted for Lincoln and would continue to back the statewide winner in every presidential election until 1940.

== Results ==
General Election Results
Party	Pledged to	Elector	Votes
Republican Party	Abraham Lincoln	William W. Vaughn	86,110
Republican Party	Abraham Lincoln	Herman Lindeman	86,109
Republican Party	Abraham Lincoln	J. Allen Barber	86,106
Republican Party	Abraham Lincoln	Bradford Rixford	86,099
Republican Party	Abraham Lincoln	Walter D. McIndoe	86,088
Democratic Party	Stephen A. Douglas	Charles Dunn	65,021
Democratic Party	Stephen A. Douglas	Emil Rothe	65,012
Democratic Party	Stephen A. Douglas	Edward G. Ryan	65,009
Democratic Party	Stephen A. Douglas	Jarius C. Farichild	65,007
Democratic Party	Stephen A. Douglas	Benjamin Ferguson	64,898
Southern Democratic	John C. Breckinridge	Samuel Elmore	888
Southern Democratic	John C. Breckinridge	Henry S. Pierpont	888 (Note: Some third party sources for the county figures use this elector, but his county figures only add up to 887)
Southern Democratic	John C. Breckinridge	Isaac J. Ullman	887
Southern Democratic	John C. Breckinridge	Hnery D. Barron	886
Southern Democratic	John C. Breckinridge	Napoleon B. Van Slyke	886
Constitutional Union	John Bell	Robert Chandler	161
Constitutional Union	John Bell	Hugh Cameron	160
Constitutional Union	John Bell	Richard Dart	160
Constitutional Union	John Bell	Talbot C. Dousman	160
Constitutional Union	John Bell	Benjamin F. Pixley	160
Write-in		Scattering	58
Votes cast (Note: Based on totals for highest elector on each ticket)			152,238

=== Results by county ===
County	Abraham Lincoln Republican		Stephen A. Douglas Democratic		John C. Breckinridge (Note: This table uses the results for Elmore, which actually do add up to 888; many sources cite Pierpont's figures, which differ as follows: 1 in Clark (instead of 2), 10 in Manitowoc (instead of 9), and 27 in Richland (instead of 28). Using Pierpont's results, however, causes the county figures to add up to 887, not the stated 888.) Southern Democratic		John Bell Constitutional Union		Margin		Total votes cast (Note: Based on highest elector on each ticket)
County	#	%	#	%	#	%	#	%	#	%	Total votes cast
Adams	844	73.71%	296	25.85%	5	0.44%	0	0.00%	548	47.86%	1,145
Ashland	35	52.24%	32	47.76%	0	0.00%	0	0.00%	3	4.48%	67
Bad Ax	1,145	70.16%	465	28.49%	22	1.35%	0	0.00%	680	41.67%	1,632
Brown	873	41.14%	1,239	58.39%	0	0.00%	0	0.00%	-366	-17.25%	2,122 (Note: Includes 10 Scattering votes)
Buffalo	459	70.62%	189	29.08%	1	0.15%	1	0.15%	270	41.54%	650
Calumet	706	53.85%	605	46.15%	0	0.00%	0	0.00%	101	7.70%	1,311
Chippewa	256	51.51%	241	48.49%	0	0.00%	0	0.00%	15	3.02%	497
Clark	152	62.55%	89	36.63%	2	0.82%	0	0.00%	63	25.93%	243
Columbia	3,386	67.63%	1,614	32.23%	4	0.08%	3	0.06%	1,772	35.39%	5,007
Crawford	828	49.70%	832	49.94%	6	0.36%	0	0.00%	-4	-0.24%	1,666
Dane	4,798	53.22%	4,174	46.30%	40	0.44%	3	0.03%	624	6.92%	9,015
Dodge	4,398	49.42%	4,456	50.07%	43	0.48%	2	0.02%	-58	-0.65%	8,899
Door	250	67.02%	123	32.98%	0	0.00%	0	0.00%	127	34.05%	373
Douglas	70	45.75%	66	43.14%	15	9.80%	2	1.31%	4	2.61%	153
Dunn	564	61.71%	341	37.31%	9	0.98%	0	0.00%	223	24.40%	914
Eau Claire	490	57.51%	342	40.14%	19	2.23%	1	0.12%	148	17.37%	852
Fond du Lac	4,106	57.65%	3,001	42.14%	3	0.04%	12	0.17%	1,105	15.52%	7,122
Grant	3,579	64.67%	1,922	34.73%	33	0.60%	0	0.00%	1,657	29.94%	5,534
Green	2,372	64.00%	1,324	35.73%	10	0.27%	0	0.00%	1,048	28.28%	3,706
Green Lake	1,957	72.97%	708	26.40%	17	0.63%	0	0.00%	1,249	46.57%	2,682
Iowa	1,909	53.96%	1,581	44.69%	46	1.30%	2	0.06%	328	9.27%	3,538
Jackson	654	75.96%	207	24.04%	0	0.00%	0	0.00%	447	51.92%	861
Jefferson	3,077	52.30%	2,794	47.49%	4	0.07%	1	0.02%	283	4.81%	5,883 (Note: Includes 7 Scattering votes)
Juneau	1,033	57.90%	737	41.31%	9	0.50%	5	0.28%	296	16.59%	1,784
Kenosha	1,637	63.92%	920	35.92%	4	0.16%	0	0.00%	717	28.00%	2,561
Kewaunee	326	32.15%	688	67.85%	0	0.00%	0	0.00%	-362	-35.70%	1,014
La Crosse	1,477	63.53%	765	32.90%	65	2.80%	18	0.77%	712	30.62%	2,325
La Pointe	43	58.90%	4	5.48%	26	35.62%	0	0.00%	17 (Note: Lincoln's margin over Breckenridge)	23.28%	73
Lafayette	1,736	47.05%	1,898	51.44%	47	1.27%	9	0.24%	-162	-4.39%	3,690
Manitowoc	2,041	51.06%	1,947	48.71%	9	0.23%	0	0.00%	94	2.35%	3,997
Marathon	219	31.06%	481	68.23%	4	0.57%	1	0.14%	-262	-37.16%	705
Marquette	781	46.79%	882	52.85%	6	0.36%	0	0.00%	-101	-6.05%	1,669
Milwaukee	4,831	41.52%	6,726	57.81%	39	0.34%	38 (Note: The canvass lists Chandler with 37 votes in Milwaukee County, the same as the other four Constitutional Union electors, but that figure might be a mistake. If 37 is correct, then Chandler only received 160 votes statewide. The figure of 38 comes from contemporary third party sources, such as the 1861 Tribune Almanac.)	0.33%	-1,895	-16.29%	11,634
Monroe	1,229	65.72%	631	33.74%	2	0.11%	8	0.43%	598	31.98%	1,870
Oconto	598	67.57%	286	32.32%	1	0.11%	0	0.00%	312	35.25%	885
Outagamie	832	43.02%	1,082	55.95%	20	1.03%	0	0.00%	-250	-12.93%	1,934
Ozaukee	627	25.51%	1,823	74.17%	8	0.33%	0	0.00%	-1,196	-48.66%	2,458
Pepin	326	73.76%	105	23.76%	11	2.49%	0	0.00%	221	50.00%	442
Pierce	637	60.67%	411	39.14%	2	0.19%	0	0.00%	226	21.52%	1,050
Polk	199	59.58%	122	36.53%	12	3.59%	1	0.30%	77	23.05%	334
Portage	944	64.13%	471	32.00%	57	3.87%	0	0.00%	473	32.13%	1,472
Racine	2,634	60.55%	1,659	38.14%	8	0.18%	8	0.18%	975	22.41%	4,350 (Note: Includes 41 Scattering votes)
Richland	1,167	59.12%	776	39.31%	28	1.42%	3	0.15%	391	19.81%	1,974
Rock	5,198	72.34%	1,916	26.66%	64	0.89%	8	0.11%	3,282	45.67%	7,186
Sauk	2,309	69.28%	985	29.55%	37	1.11%	2	0.06%	1,324	39.72%	3,333
Shawano	163	58.84%	114	41.16%	0	0.00%	0	0.00%	49	17.69%	277
Sheboygan	2,731	55.54%	2,179	44.32%	7	0.14%	0	0.00%	552	11.23%	4,917
St. Croix	664	52.53%	597	47.23%	3	0.24%	0	0.00%	67	5.30%	1,264
Trempealeau	490	78.53%	134	21.47%	0	0.00%	0	0.00%	356	57.05%	624
Walworth	3,910	70.85%	1,591	28.83%	15	0.27%	3	0.05%	2,319	42.02%	5,519
Washington	939	25.47%	2,747	74.51%	1	0.03%	0	0.00%	-1,808	-49.04%	3,687
Waukesha	3,020	53.81%	2,563	45.67%	10	0.18%	19	0.34%	457	8.14%	5,612
Waupaca	1,340	69.07%	575	29.64%	16	0.82%	9	0.46%	765	39.43%	1,940
Waushara	1,534	78.15%	405	20.63%	24	1.22%	0	0.00%	1,129	57.51%	1,963
Winnebago	3,225	63.21%	1,859	36.44%	16	0.31%	2	0.04%	1,366	26.77%	5,102
Wood	362	50.21%	301	41.75%	58	8.04%	0	0.00%	61	8.46%	721
Total	86,110	56.56%	65,021	42.71%	888	0.58%	161	0.11%	21,089	13.85%	152,238

==== Counties that flipped from Democratic to Republican ====
- Buffalo
- Jefferso
- Manitowoc
- Sheboygan

==== Counties that flipped from Republican to Democratic ====
- Crawford
- Dodge
- Marathon
- Marquette

== See also ==
- United States presidential elections in Wisconsin
