= 1848 United States presidential election in Wisconsin =

- November 7, 1848
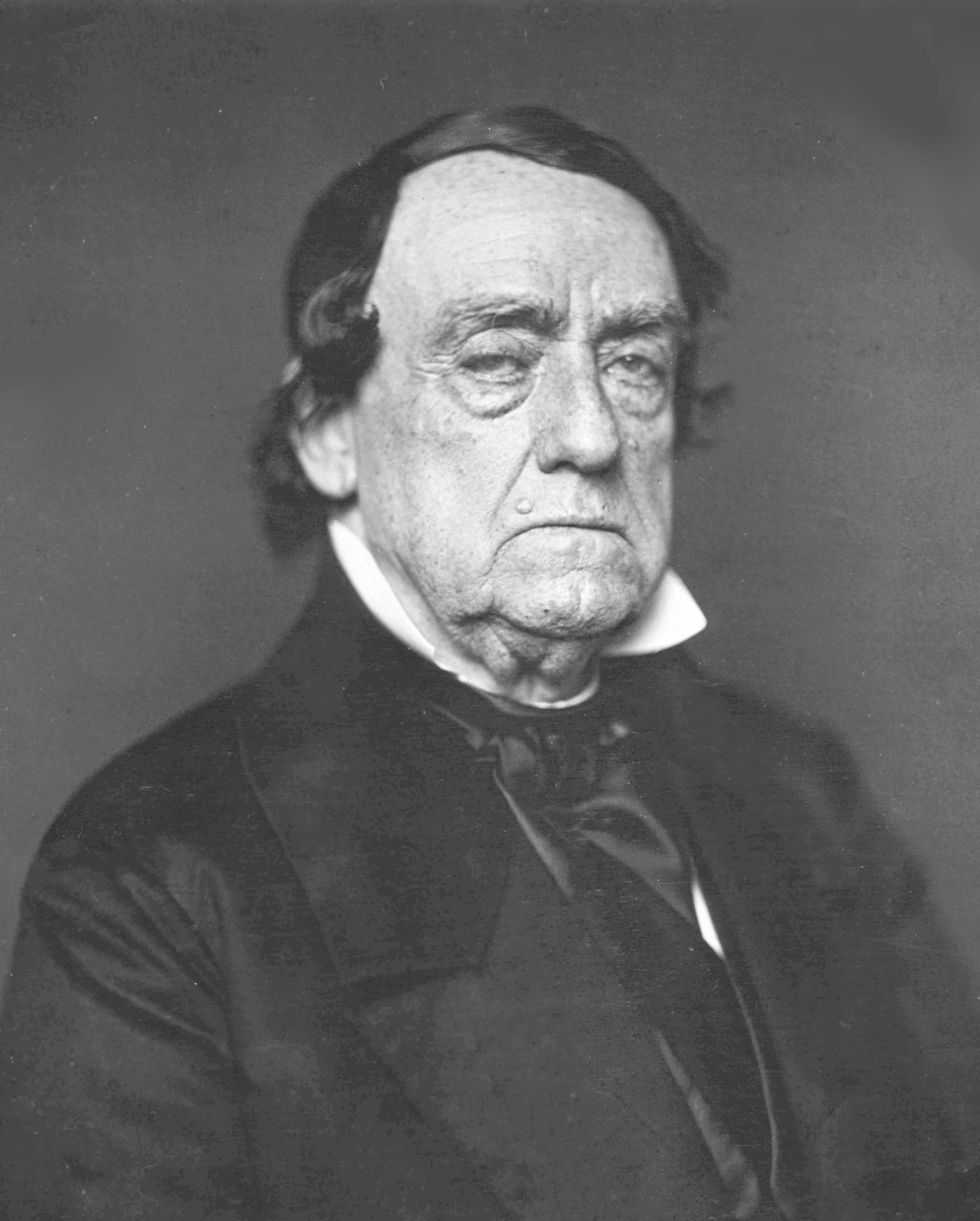

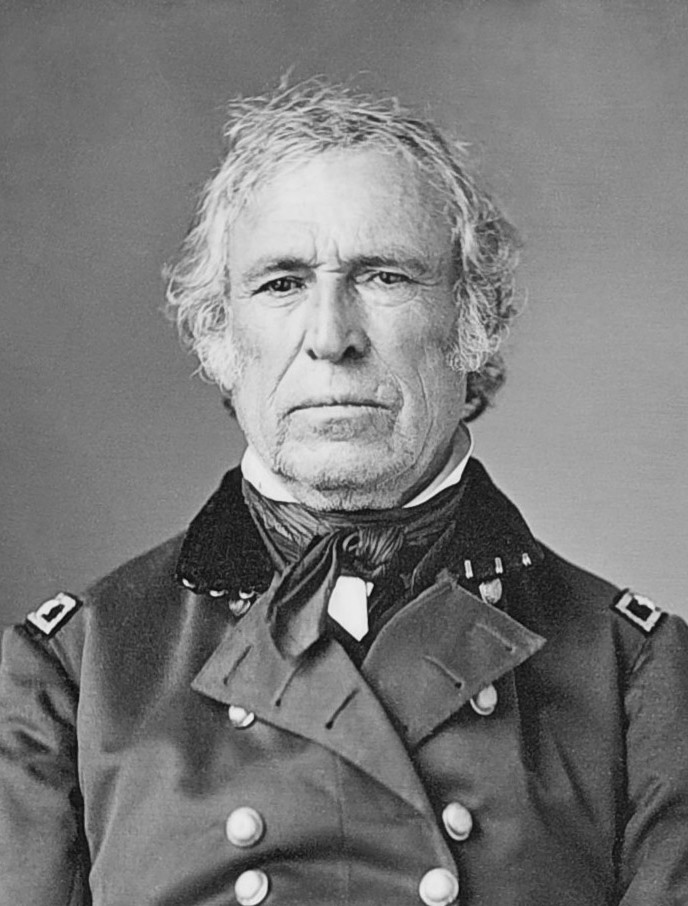

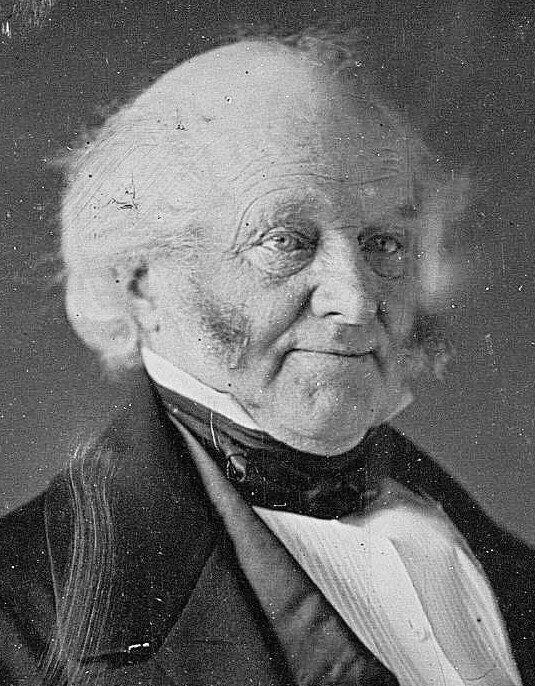
Nominee	Lewis Cass	Zachary Taylor	Martin Van Buren
Party	Democratic	Whig	Free Soil
Home state	Michigan	Louisiana	New York
Running mate	William O. Butler	Millard Fillmore	Charles Francis Adams Sr.
Electoral vote	4	0	0
Popular vote	14,924	13,642	10,261
Percentage	38.41%	35.11%	26.41%
County results
Cass
30–40%
40–50%
50–60%
60–70%
Taylor
30–40%
40–50%
50–60%
Van Buren
30–40%
40–50%
50–60%
President before election
James K. Polk
Democratic
Elected President
Zachary Taylor
Whig

The 1848 United States presidential election in Wisconsin was held on November 7, 1848, as part of the 1848 United States presidential election. It was the first presidential election held in Wisconsin since its admission to the Union on May 29, earlier the same year. Democratic candidate Lewis Cass won the state with 38% of the vote, carrying the state's 4 electoral votes.

With 26.41% of the popular vote, Wisconsin would prove to be Van Buren's third strongest state after Vermont and Massachusetts.

The 1848 election began a trend in Wisconsin where the state would vote the same as neighboring Iowa, as the two states have voted in lockstep with each other on all but 6 occasions - 1892, 1924, 1940, 1976, 2004, and 2020. This was the last time until 1988 that Wisconsin would back a losing Democrat in a presidential election.

Participating in its first presidential election, Portage County would ultimately be carried by the statewide winner in every election until 1916. Meanwhile, Winnebago County would not vote for the statewide loser again until 1924.

== Results ==
General Election Results
Party	Pledged to	Elector	Votes
Democratic Party	Lewis Cass	Francis Huebschman	14,924
Democratic Party	Lewis Cass	William Dinwiddie	14,910
Democratic Party	Lewis Cass	David F. Maples	14,886
Democratic Party	Lewis Cass	Samuel P. Nichols	14,767
Whig Party	Zachary Taylor	James Maxwell	13,642
Whig Party	Zachary Taylor	Rufus King	13,642
Whig Party	Zachary Taylor	Jacob J. Enos	13,634
Whig Party	Zachary Taylor	Harrison Reed	13,632
Free Soil Party	Martin Van Buren	David Giddings	10,261
Free Soil Party	Martin Van Buren	James D. Reymert	10,257
Free Soil Party	Martin Van Buren	Erastus B. Wolcott	10,257
Free Soil Party	Martin Van Buren	Edward A. Tappan	10,254
Write-in		Scattering	32
Votes cast (Note: Based on totals for highest elector on each ticket)			38,859

=== Results by county ===
County	Lewis Cass Democratic		Zachary Taylor Whig		Martin Van Buren Free Soil		Scattering Write-in		Margin		Total votes cast (Note: Based on highest elector on each ticket)
County	#	%	#	%	#	%	#	%	#	%	Total votes cast
Brown	309	55.48%	248	44.52%	0	0.00%	0	0.00%	61	10.95%	557
Calumet	79	51.30%	65	42.21%	10	6.49%	0	0.00%	14	9.09%	154
Columbia	145	23.62%	303	49.35%	166	27.04%	0	0.00%	-137 (Note: Taylor's margin over Van Buren)	-22.31%	614
Crawfor	215	63.99%	109	32.44%	12	3.57%	0	0.00%	106	31.55%	336
Dane	757	39.32%	724	37.61%	443	23.01%	1	0.05%	33	1.71%	1,925
Dodge	797	40.64%	527	26.87%	637	32.48%	0	0.00%	160 (Note: Cass's margin over Van Buren)	8.16%	1,961
Fond du Lac	483	33.87%	446	31.28%	497	34.85%	0	0.00%	-14	-0.98%	1,426
Grant	1,148	39.03%	1,649	56.07%	144	4.90%	0	0.00%	-501	-17.04%	2,941
Green	391	33.79%	479	41.40%	287	24.81%	0	0.00%	-88	-7.61%	1,157
Iowa	848	45.84%	884	47.78%	118	6.38%	0	0.00%	-36	-1.95%	1,850
Jefferson	840	39.72%	713	33.71%	562	26.57%	0	0.00%	127	6.00%	2,115
Lafayette	1,105	53.72%	921	44.77%	31	1.51%	0	0.00%	184	8.95%	2,057
Manitowoc	159	51.46%	76	24.60%	70	22.65%	4	1.29%	83	26.86%	309
Marquette	174	30.96%	214	38.08%	174	30.96%	0	0.00%	-40	-7.12%	562
Milwaukee	2,150	54.21%	1,190	30.01%	626	15.78%	0	0.00%	960	24.21%	3,966
Portage	225	51.02%	216	48.98%	0	0.00%	0	0.00%	9	2.04%	441
Racine	644	18.50%	904	25.96%	1,930	55.43%	4	0.11%	-1,026 (Note: Van Buren's margin over Taylor)	-29.47%	3,482
Rock	491	15.65%	1,300	41.43%	1,338	42.64%	9	0.29%	-38	-1.21%	3,138
Sauk (Note: The official canvass at the Historical Society does not list any votes in Sauk County for presidential electors, although there are votes listed for Superintendent and the 2nd Congressional District.)	158	33.91%	149	31.97%	159	34.12%	0	0.00%	-1	-0.21%	466
Sheboygan	442	44.69%	372	37.61%	175	17.69%	0	0.00%	70	7.08%	989
St. Croix	67	57.26%	37	31.62%	1	0.85%	12	10.26%	30	25.64%	117
Walworth	550	19.30%	804	28.21%	1,494	52.42%	2	0.07%	-690	-24.21%	2,850
Washington	1,720	71.70%	355	14.80%	324	13.51%	0	0.00%	1,365	56.90%	2,399
Waukesha	963	34.75%	806	29.09%	1,002	36.16%	0	0.00%	-39	-1.41%	2,771
Winnebago	222	29.92%	300	40.43%	220	29.65%	0	0.00%	-78	-10.51%	742
Total (Note: Does not include the votes from Sauk County)	14,924	38.41%	13,642	35.11%	10,261	26.41%	32	0.08%	1,282	3.30%	38,859

== See also ==
- United States presidential elections in Wisconsin
