= 1856 United States presidential election in Wisconsin =

- November 4, 1856
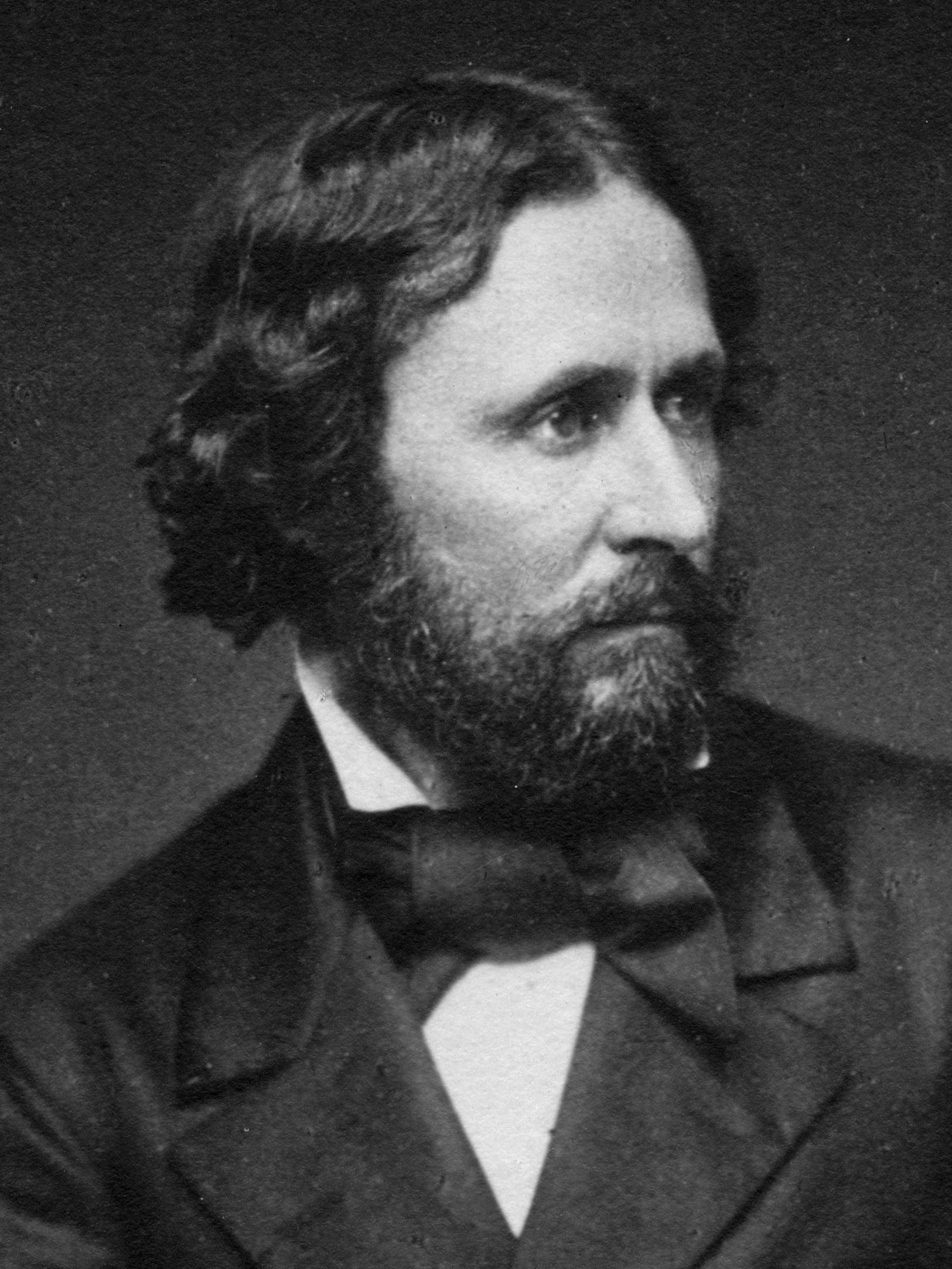

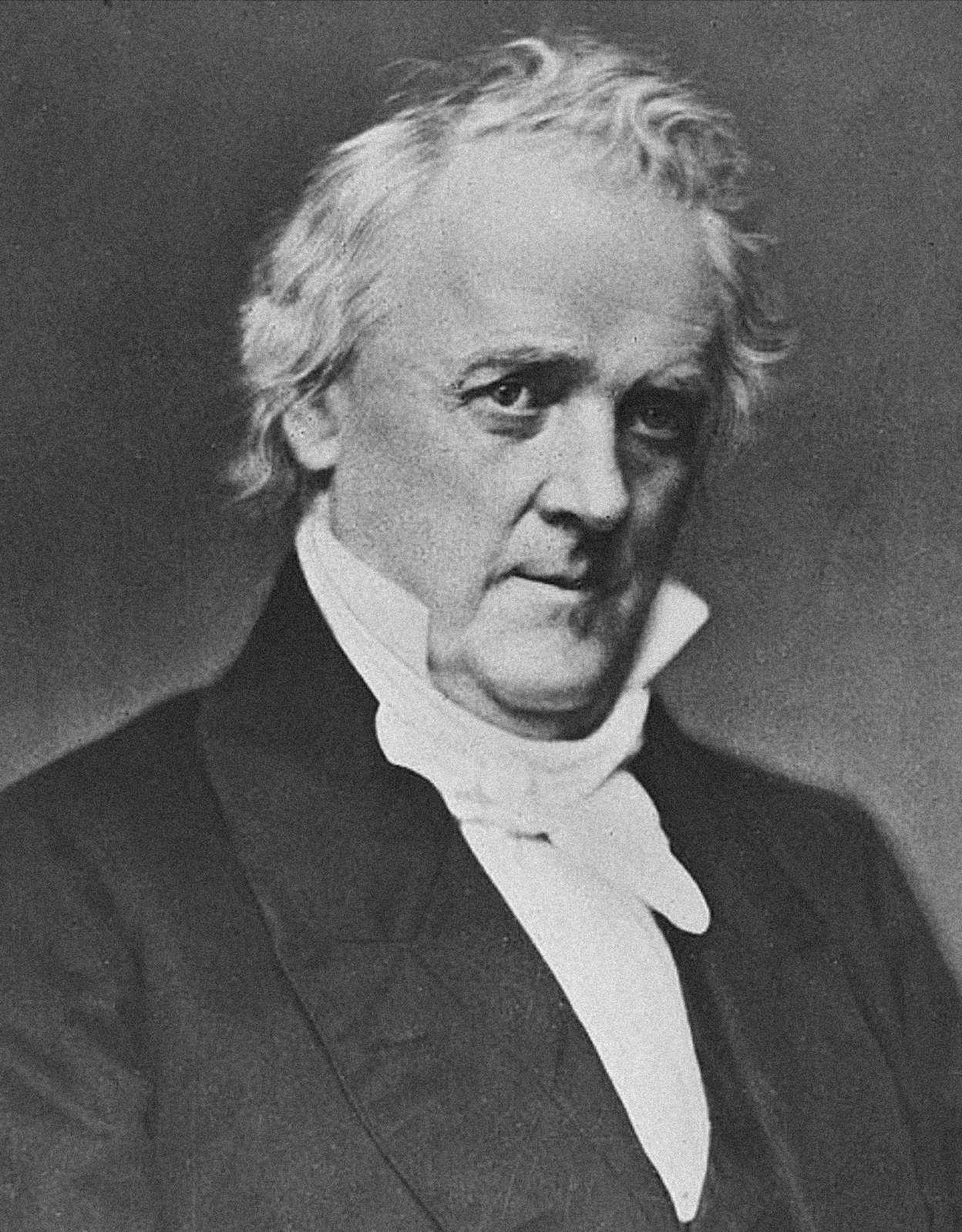
Nominee	John C. Frémont	James Buchanan
Party	Republican	Democratic
Home state	California	Pennsylvania
Running mate	William L. Dayton	John C. Breckinridge
Electoral vote	5	0
Popular vote	66,092	52,867
Percentage	55.07%	44.05%
County results
Frémont
40–50%
50–60%
60–70%
70–80%
80–90%
Buchanan
50–60%
60–70%
70–80%
80–90%
90–100%
President before election
Franklin Pierce
Democratic
Elected President
James Buchanan
Democratic

The 1856 United States presidential election in Wisconsin was held on November 4, 1856, as part of the 1856 United States presidential election. State voters chose five electors to the Electoral College, who voted for president and vice president.

John C. Frémont of the newly formed Republican Party won Wisconsin with 55% of the popular vote, winning the state's five electoral votes.

Due to a snowstorm, Wisconsin's five electors could not convene on the constitutionally-mandated date to cast their electoral votes. They instead met on a later date and cast five votes for Frémont for president and five votes for William L. Dayton for vice president. During the joint session of Congress to count the electoral votes, objections were raised that Wisconsin's votes were invalid because they had not been cast on the correct day. After a two-day debate in which the President of the Senate attempted to unilaterally count Wisconsin's votes in the face of objections from the joint session, the matter was dropped because it was immaterial to the overall outcome of the election.

Fremont's victory was the first of nine consecutive Republican victories in the state, as Wisconsin would not vote for a Democratic candidate again until Grover Cleveland in 1892.

== Results ==
General Election Results
Party	Pledged to	Elector	Votes
Republican Party	John C. Frémont	James H. Knowlton	66,092
Republican Party	John C. Frémont	Edward D. Holton	66,090
Republican Party	John C. Frémont	Walter D. McIndoe	66,070
Republican Party	John C. Frémont	Billee Williams	65,976
Republican Party	John C. Frémont	Gregor Menzel	65,762
Democratic Party	James Buchanan	Otis Preston	52,867
Democratic Party	James Buchanan	John Mitchell	52,854
Democratic Party	James Buchanan	Henry M. Billings	52,843
Democratic Party	James Buchanan	R. Schleisinger Weil	52,736
Democratic Party	James Buchanan	John Fitzgerald	52,635
American Party	Millard Fillmore	Richard Dart	580
American Party	Millard Fillmore	Harrison Ludington	579
American Party	Millard Fillmore	David A. Fairchild	577
American Party	Millard Fillmore	Zeni Rounds	576
American Party	Millard Fillmore	Robert Chandler	573
Write-in		Scattering	469
Votes cast (Note: Based on totals for highest elector on each ticket)			120,008

=== Results by county ===
County	John C. Frémont Republican		James Buchanan Democratic		Millard Fillmore American		Scattering Write-in		Margin		Total votes cast (Note: Based on highest elector on each ticket)
County	#	%	#	%	#	%	#	%	#	%	Total votes cast
Adams	1,617	73.30%	582	26.38%	7	0.32%	0	0.00%	1,035	46.92%	2,206
Bad Ax	596	66.52%	231	25.78%	21	2.34%	48	5.36%	365	40.74%	896
Brown	499	33.20%	1,004	66.80%	0	0.00%	0	0.00%	-505	-33.60%	1,503
Buffalo	68	29.31%	163	70.26%	0	0.00%	1	0.43%	-95	-40.95%	232
Calumet	486	53.52%	410	45.15%	1	0.11%	11	1.21%	76	8.37%	908
Clark	73	66.36%	37	33.64%	0	0.00%	0	0.00%	36	32.73%	110
Columbia	2,952	70.27%	1,242	29.56%	7	0.17%	0	0.00%	1,710	40.70%	4,201
Crawfor	519	52.42%	429	43.33%	1	0.10%	41	4.14%	90	9.09%	990
Dane	3,999	53.69%	3,443	46.23%	6	0.08%	0	0.00%	556	7.47%	7,448
Dodge	3,455	55.15%	2,795	44.61%	15	0.24%	0	0.00%	660	10.53%	6,265
Dunn	390	62.10%	119	18.95%	0	0.00%	119 (Note: These votes appear to have been intended for Democratic elector Fitzgerald)	18.95%	271	43.15%	628
Fond du Lac	3,292	54.73%	2,564	42.63%	25	0.42%	134 (Note: At least some of these votes appear to have been intended for Republican electors Williams and Menzel)	2.23%	728	12.10%	6,015
Grant	2,809	63.64%	1,419	32.15%	186	4.21%	0	0.00%	1,390	31.49%	4,414
Green	2,004	64.17%	1,087	34.81%	32	1.02%	0	0.00%	917	29.36%	3,123
Iowa	1,497	49.93%	1,474	49.17%	27	0.90%	0	0.00%	23	0.77%	2,998
Jackson	306	66.38%	137	29.72%	6	1.30%	12	2.60%	169	36.66%	461
Jefferson	3,289	48.87%	3,435	51.04%	6	0.09%	0	0.00%	-146	-2.17%	6,730
Kenosha	1,508	64.47%	831	35.53%	0	0.00%	0	0.00%	677	28.94%	2,339
Kewaunee	89	28.71%	206	66.45%	5	1.61%	10	3.23%	-117	-37.74%	310
La Crosse	987	63.55%	541	34.84%	25	1.61%	0	0.00%	446	28.72%	1,553
Lafayette	1,410	44.75%	1,722	54.65%	19	0.60%	0	0.00%	-312	-9.90%	3,151
Manitowoc	1,177	38.20%	1,904	61.80%	0	0.00%	0	0.00%	-727	-23.60%	3,081
Marathon	269	56.51%	207	43.49%	0	0.00%	0	0.00%	62	13.03%	476
Marquette	2,517	70.54%	1,032	28.92%	19	0.53%	0	0.00%	1,485	41.62%	3,568
Milwaukee	2,798	27.95%	7,187	71.80%	25	0.25%	0	0.00%	-4,389	-43.85%	10,010
Monroe	722	73.52%	254	25.87%	6	0.61%	0	0.00%	468	47.66%	982
Outagamie	597	42.98%	753	54.21%	0	0.00%	39	2.81%	-156	-11.23%	1,389
Ozaukee	359	15.01%	2,033	84.99%	0	0.00%	0	0.00%	-1,674	-69.98%	2,392
Pierce	414	77.97%	106	19.96%	11	2.07%	0	0.00%	308	58.00%	531
Polk	95	63.76%	54	36.24%	0	0.00%	0	0.00%	41	27.52%	149
Portage	680	64.52%	361	34.25%	13	1.23%	0	0.00%	319	30.27%	1,054
Racine	2,299	57.56%	1,689	42.29%	6	0.15%	0	0.00%	610	15.27%	3,994
Richland	882	64.24%	454	33.07%	37	2.69%	0	0.00%	428	31.17%	1,373
Rock	4,707	70.42%	1,964	29.38%	10	0.15%	3	0.04%	2,743	41.04%	6,684
Sauk	2,015	66.83%	993	32.94%	4	0.13%	3	0.10%	1,022	33.90%	3,015
Shawano	60	59.41%	34	33.66%	0	0.00%	7	6.93%	26	25.74%	101
Sheboygan	1,891	49.40%	1,922	50.21%	15	0.39%	0	0.00%	-31	-0.81%	3,828
St. Croix	417	62.33%	252	37.67%	0	0.00%	0	0.00%	165	24.66%	669
Trempealeau	190	80.85%	45	19.15%	0	0.00%	0	0.00%	145	61.70%	235
Walworth	3,518	72.45%	1,295	26.67%	4	0.08%	39	0.80%	2,223	45.78%	4,856
Washington	811	23.41%	2,646	76.36%	7	0.20%	1	0.03%	-1,835	-52.96%	3,465
Waukesha	2,875	58.63%	2,020	41.19%	8	0.16%	1	0.02%	855	17.43%	4,904
Waupaca	633	90.56%	66	9.44%	0	0.00%	0	0.00%	567	81.12%	699
Waushara	1,292	85.39%	215	14.21%	6	0.40%	0	0.00%	1,077	71.18%	1,513
Winnebago	2,769	65.87%	1,415	33.66%	20	0.48%	0	0.00%	1,354	32.21%	4,204
Wood	260	73.24%	95	26.76%	0	0.00%	0	0.00%	165	46.48%	355
Total	66,092	55.07%	52,867	44.05%	580	0.48%	469	0.39%	13,225	11.02%	120,008

==== Counties that flipped from Democratic to Republican ====
- Bad Ax
- Calumet
- Columbia
- Crawford
- Dane
- Dodge
- Fond du Lac
- Grant
- Green
- Iowa
- La Crosse
- Marathon
- Marquette
- Portage
- Racine
- Rock
- Sauk
- St. Croix
- Waukesha
- Waushara
- Winnebago

==== Counties that flipped from Whig to Republican ====
- Richland
- Waupaca

==== Counties that flipped from Free Soil to Republican ====
- Kenosha
- Walworth

== See also ==
- United States presidential elections in Wisconsin
