= 1868 United States presidential election in Wisconsin =

- November 3, 1868
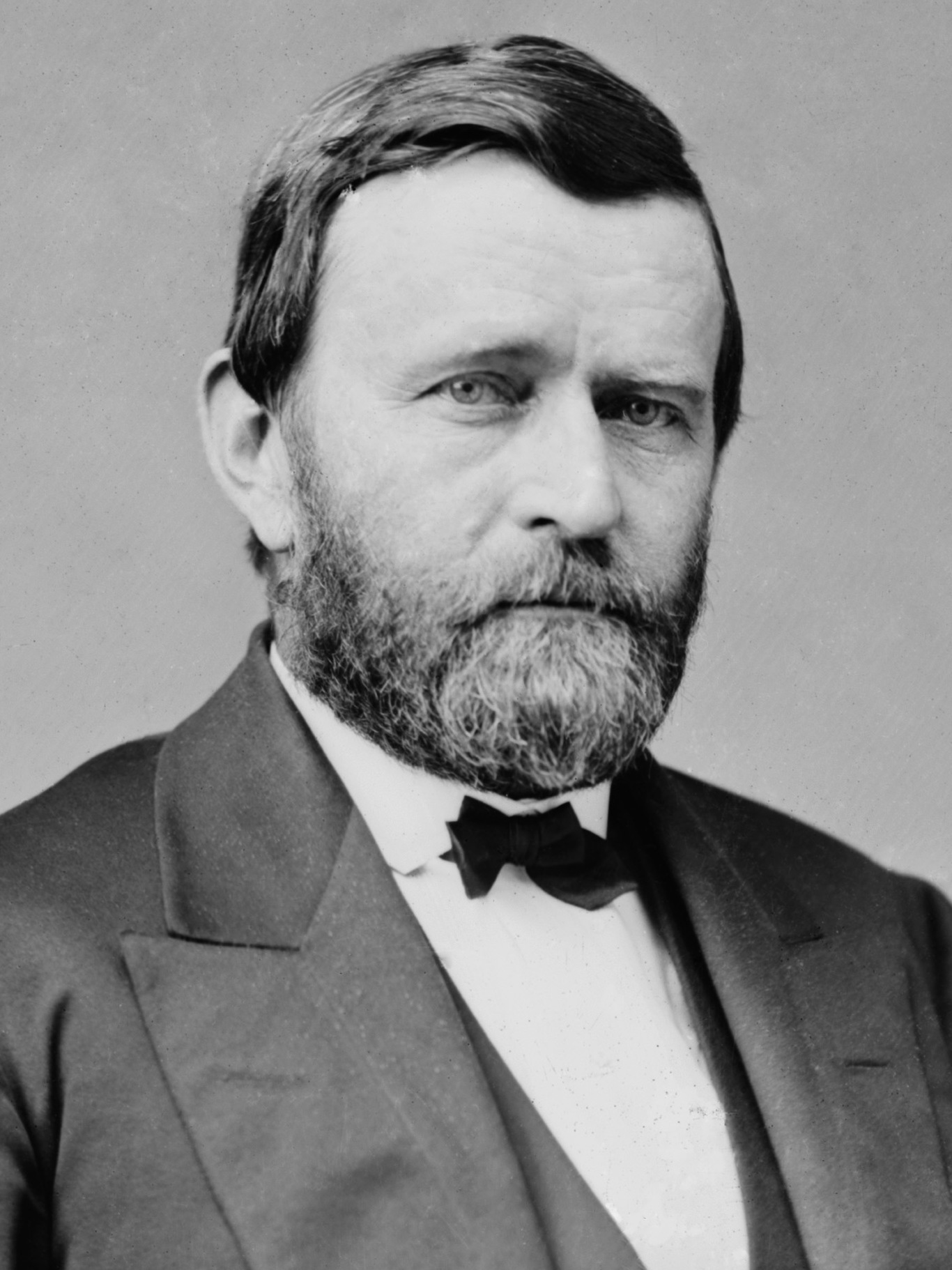

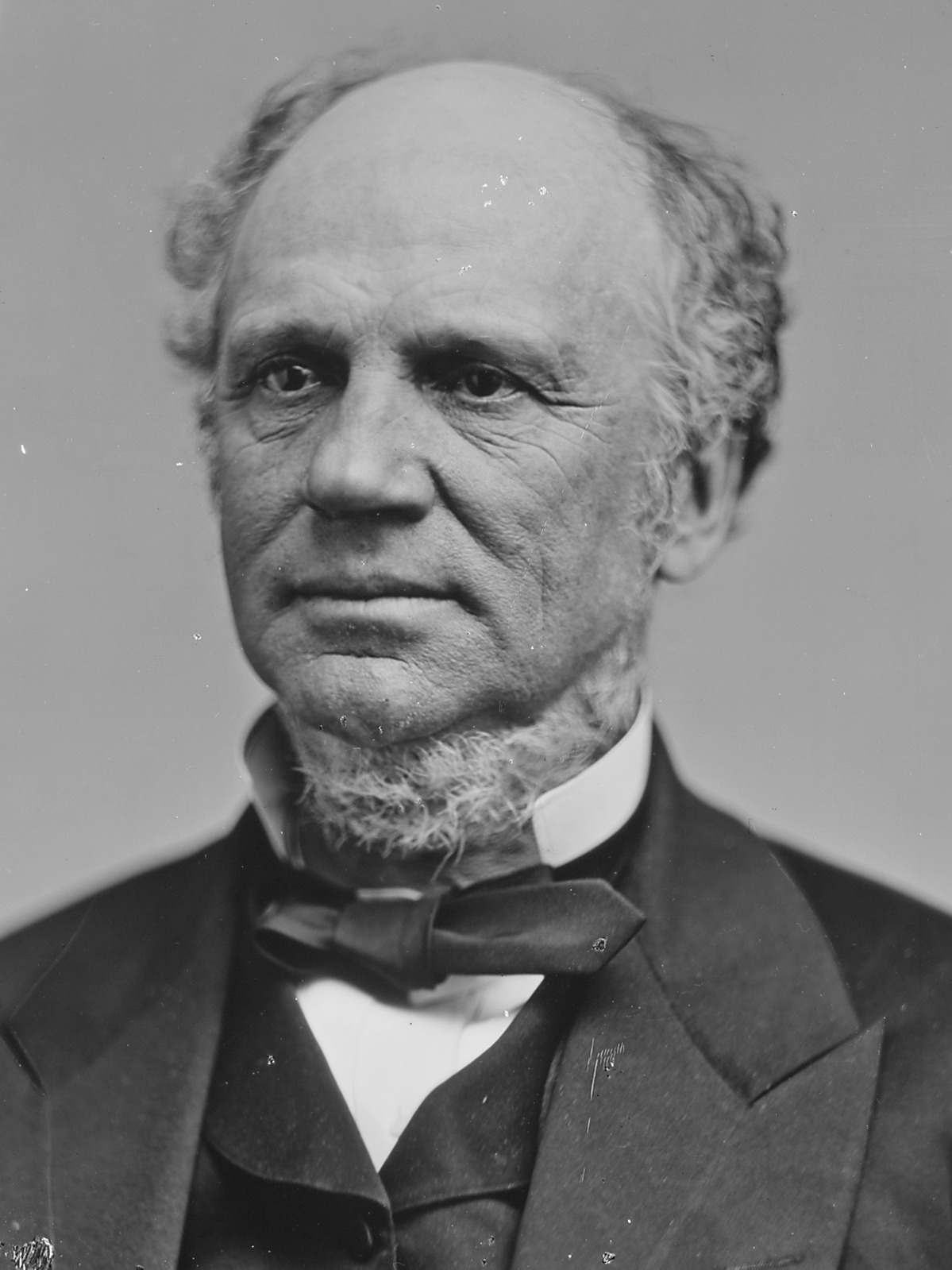
Nominee	Ulysses S. Grant	Horatio Seymour
Party	Republican	Democratic
Home state	Illinois	New York
Running mate	Schuyler Colfax	Francis Preston Blair Jr.
Electoral vote	8	0
Popular vote	108,857	84,710
Percentage	56.22%	43.75%
County results
Grant
50–60%
60–70%
70–80%
80–90%
90–100%
Seymour
50–60%
60–70%
70–80%
80–90%
Tie
Unknown/no vote
President before election
Andrew Johnson
Democratic
Elected President
Ulysses S. Grant
Republican

The 1868 United States presidential election in Wisconsin was held on November 3, 1868, as part of the 1868 United States presidential election. State voters chose eight electors to the Electoral College, who voted for president and vice president.

Wisconsin was won by Republican Party candidate Ulysses S. Grant, over Democratic candidate, Horatio Seymour. Grant won the state with 56.22% of the popular vote, winning the state's eight electoral votes.

Lafayette County voted for a Republican for the first time in this election and would continue to vote Republican in every election until 1912. Conversely, Fond du Lac County voted Republican for the last time until 1896. In this election, Iowa County began a streak of backing the statewide winner that lasted until 1940.

== Results ==
General Election Results
Party	Pledged to	Elector	Votes
Republican Party	Ulysses S. Grant	Allen Warden	108,857
Republican Party	Ulysses S. Grant	Henry D. Barron	108,853
Republican Party	Ulysses S. Grant	Elihu Enos	108,851
Republican Party	Ulysses S. Grant	W. G. Ritch	108,849
Republican Party	Ulysses S. Grant	S. S. Barlow	108,847
Republican Party	Ulysses S. Grant	William T. Price	108,837
Republican Party	Ulysses S. Grant	Charles G. Williams	108,809
Republican Party	Ulysses S. Grant	L. F. Frisby	108,793
Democratic Party	Horatio Seymour	Samuel Ryan Jr.	84,710
Democratic Party	Horatio Seymour	Theodore Rodolf	84,709
Democratic Party	Horatio Seymour	N. D. Fratt	84,707
Democratic Party	Horatio Seymour	H. N. Smith	84,705
Democratic Party	Horatio Seymour	A. G. Cook	84,704
Democratic Party	Horatio Seymour	Moses M. Strong	84,704
Democratic Party	Horatio Seymour	Gilbert L. Park	84,702
Democratic Party	Horatio Seymour	George B. Smith	84,695
Write-in		Scattering	53
Votes cast (Note: Based on totals for highest elector on each ticket)			193,620

=== Results by county ===
County	Ulysses S. Grant Republican		Horatio Seymour Democratic		Margin		Total votes cast (Note: Based on highest elector on each ticket)
County	#	%	#	%	#	%	Total votes cast
Adams	958	74.96%	320	25.04%	638	49.92%	1,278
Ashland	9	23.08%	30	76.92%	-21	-53.85%	39
Bayfield	20	45.45%	24	54.55%	-4	-9.09%	44
Brown	1,806	47.22%	2,019	52.78%	-213	-5.57%	3,825
Buffalo	1,093	70.61%	455	29.39%	638	41.21%	1,548
Calumet	985	46.44%	1,136	53.56%	-151	-7.12%	2,121
Chippewa	677	49.45%	692	50.55%	-15	-1.10%	1,369
Clark	411	75.00%	137	25.00%	274	50.00%	548
Columbia	3,867	67.14%	1,893	32.86%	1,974	34.27%	5,760
Crawford	1,104	48.21%	1,186	51.79%	-82	-3.58%	2,290
Dane	5,731	54.00%	4,880	45.99%	851	8.02%	10,612 (Note: Includes 1 Scattering vote)
Dodge	3,634	39.04%	5,675	60.96%	-2,041	-21.93%	9,309
Door	643	79.58%	165	20.42%	478	59.16%	808
Douglas	73	50.00%	73	50.00%	0	0.00%	146
Dunn	1,138	76.38%	352	23.62%	786	52.75%	1,490
Eau Claire	1,287	64.54%	707	35.46%	580	29.09%	1,994
Fond du Lac	4,734	51.46%	4,466	48.54%	268	2.91%	9,200
Grant	4,640	69.12%	2,071	30.85%	2,569	38.27%	6,713 (Note: Includes 2 Scattering votes)
Green	2,791	68.32%	1,294	31.68%	1,497	36.65%	4,085
Green Lake	1,803	69.13%	805	30.87%	998	38.27%	2,608
Iowa	2,345	54.48%	1,959	45.52%	386	8.97%	4,304
Jackson	1,056	73.74%	376	26.26%	680	47.49%	1,432
Jefferson	3,195	46.02%	3,747	53.98%	-552	-7.95%	6,942
Juneau	1,445	56.47%	1,114	43.53%	331	12.93%	2,559
Kenosha	1,530	56.17%	1,194	43.83%	336	12.33%	2,724
Kewaunee	645	43.11%	851	56.89%	-206	-13.77%	1,496
La Crosse	2,368	63.03%	1,388	36.94%	980	26.08%	3,757
Lafayette	2,220	50.96%	2,136	49.04%	84	1.93%	4,356
Manitowoc	2,605	49.67%	2,640	50.33%	-35	-0.67%	5,245
Marathon	209	20.96%	788	79.04%	-579	-58.07%	997
Marquette	667	42.03%	920	57.97%	-253	-15.94%	1,587
Milwaukee	6,101	40.20%	9,074	59.80%	-2,973	-19.59%	15,175
Monroe	1,951	60.99%	1,248	39.01%	703	21.98%	3,199
Oconto	842	69.13%	376	30.87%	466	38.26%	1,218
Outagamie	1,501	45.40%	1,805	54.60%	-304	-9.20%	3,306
Ozaukee	512	19.91%	2,059	80.09%	-1,547	-60.17%	2,571
Pepin	544	71.02%	222	28.98%	322	42.04%	766
Pierce	1,356	71.78%	533	28.22%	823	43.57%	1,889
Polk	322	69.10%	144	30.90%	178	38.20%	466
Portage	1,231	62.46%	740	37.54%	491	24.91%	1,971
Racine	3,130	61.89%	1,927	38.11%	1,203	23.79%	5,057
Richland	1,619	59.50%	1,102	40.50%	517	19.00%	2,721
Rock	5,583	71.88%	2,135	27.49%	3,448	44.39%	7,767 (Note: Includes 49 Scattering votes)
Sauk	3,262	70.48%	1,366	29.52%	1,896	40.97%	4,628
Shawano	299	55.99%	235	44.01%	64	11.99%	534
Sheboygan	3,062	55.48%	2,457	44.52%	605	10.96%	5,519
St. Croix	1,237	60.40%	811	39.60%	426	20.80%	2,048
Trempealeau	1,193	81.66%	268	18.34%	925	63.31%	1,461
Vernon	2,248	78.35%	621	21.65%	1,627	56.71%	2,869
Walworth	4,184	72.74%	1,568	27.26%	2,616	45.48%	5,752
Washington	1,213	28.30%	3,073	71.70%	-1,860	-43.40%	4,286
Waukesha	2,930	49.65%	2,971	50.35%	-41	-0.69%	5,901
Waupaca	1,994	68.62%	912	31.38%	1,082	37.23%	2,906
Waushara	1,741	81.85%	386	18.15%	1,355	63.70%	2,127
Winnebago	4,712	63.21%	2,742	36.79%	1,970	26.43%	7,454
Wood	401	47.57%	442	52.43%	-41	-4.86%	843
Total	108,857	56.22%	84,710	43.75%	24,147	12.47%	193,620

==== Counties that flipped from Democratic to Republican ====
- Iowa
- Lafayette
- Sheboygan

== See also ==
- United States presidential elections in Wisconsin
