= 1880 United States presidential election in Wisconsin =

- November 2, 1880
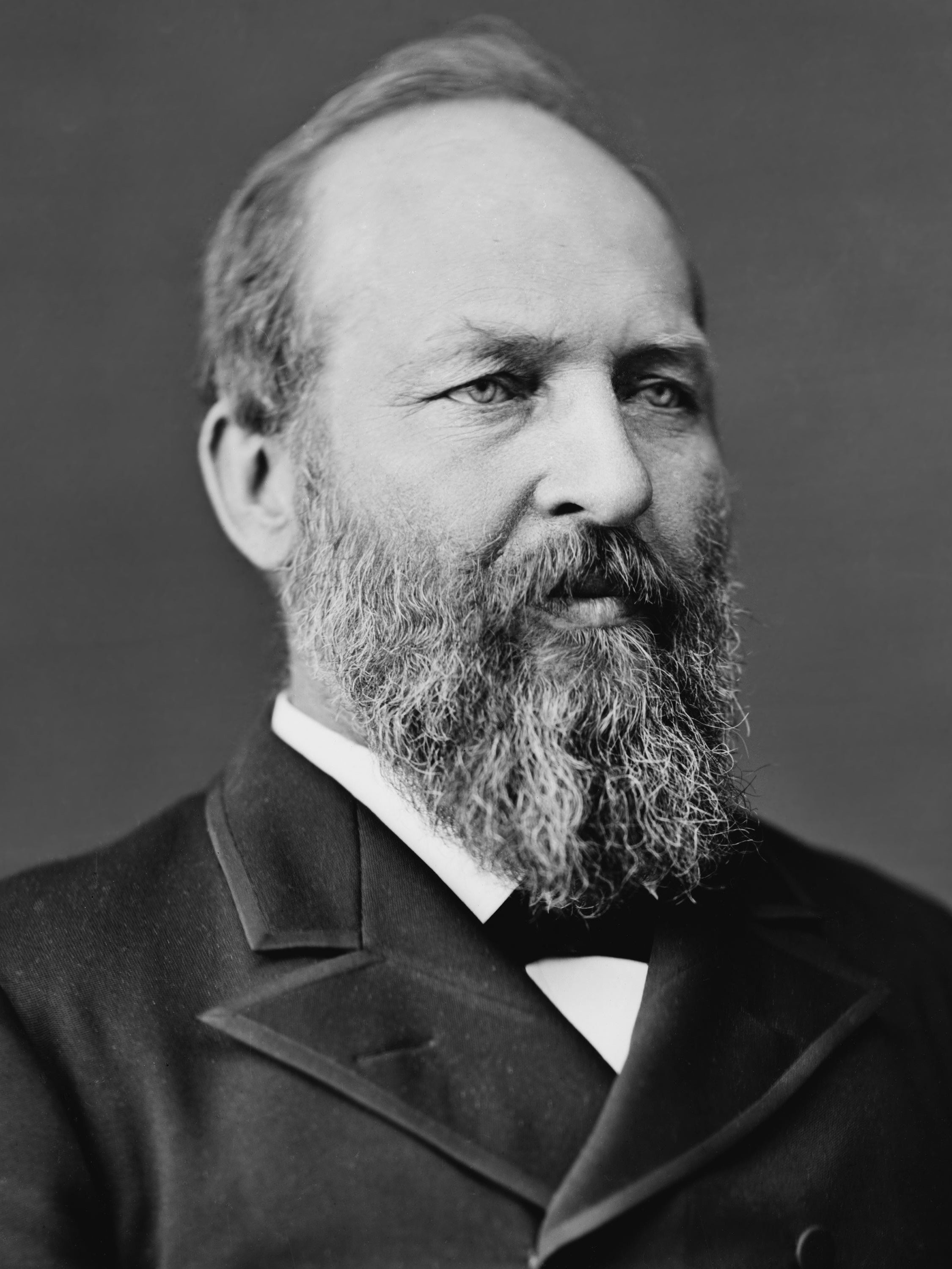

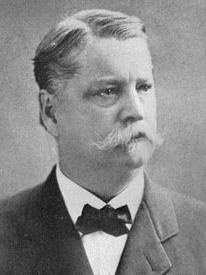
Nominee	James A. Garfield	Winfield Scott Hancock
Party	Republican	Democratic
Home state	Ohio	Pennsylvania
Running mate	Chester A. Arthur	William Hayden English
Electoral vote	10	0
Popular vote	144,400	114,649
Percentage	54.04%	42.91%
County results
Garfield
40–50%
50–60%
60–70%
70–80%
80–90%
Hancock
40–50%
50–60%
60–70%
70–80%
President before election
Rutherford B. Hayes
Republican
Elected President
James A. Garfield
Republican

The 1880 United States presidential election in Wisconsin was held on November 2, 1880, as part of the 1880 United States presidential election. State voters chose ten electors to the Electoral College, who voted for president and vice president.

Republican Party candidate James A. Garfield won Wisconsin with 54.04% of the popular vote, winning the state's ten electoral votes.

This was the first election in which Milwaukee County voted for a Republican. After this election, Bayfield County, Douglas County, and Price County would not vote Democratic again until 1932.

== Results ==
General Election Results (Note: The 1881 Blue Book gives the totals as Garfield 144,398; Hancock 114,644; Weaver 7,986; Phelps 91; Dow 68; and no Scattering. These totals are not incorrect per se; an elector on each ticket received that number of votes, but in the case of Garfield, Hancock, and Phelps, they are not the totals for the highest elector on each ticket. The 1881 Blue Book does not give the results for all electors.)
Party	Pledged to	Elector	Votes
Republican Party	James A. Garfield	George E. Weatherby	144,400
Republican Party	James A. Garfield	Lucins S. Blake	144,398
Republican Party	James A. Garfield	Knud Langland	144,398
Republican Party	James A. Garfield	William P. McLaren	144,398
Republican Party	James A. Garfield	George End	144,397
Republican Party	James A. Garfield	Edward L. Browne	144,396
Republican Party	James A. Garfield	John T. Kingston	144,396
Republican Party	James A. Garfield	Frederick H. Kribs	144,395
Republican Party	James A. Garfield	Charles P. Lovell	144,394
Republican Party	James A. Garfield	John Kellogg	144,389
Democratic Party	Winfield S. Hancock	John D. Putnam	114,649
Democratic Party	Winfield S. Hancock	John Bentley	114,646
Democratic Party	Winfield S. Hancock	Charles Stoppenbach	114,646
Democratic Party	Winfield S. Hancock	William Murphy	114,644
Democratic Party	Winfield S. Hancock	Charles D. Robinson	114,643
Democratic Party	Winfield S. Hancock	George H. Brickner	114,642
Democratic Party	Winfield S. Hancock	Hugh Campbell	114,641
Democratic Party	Winfield S. Hancock	Nicholas Fratt	114,636
Democratic Party	Winfield S. Hancock	Ferdinand Kuehn	114,634
Democratic Party	Winfield S. Hancock	John Lawler	114,629
Greenback Party	James B. Weaver	John G. Hull	7,986
Greenback Party	James B. Weaver	David R. Giddings	7,986
Greenback Party	James B. Weaver	James Meehan	7,986
Greenback Party	James B. Weaver	George W. Lee	7,986
Greenback Party	James B. Weaver	Milan Ford	7,985
Greenback Party	James B. Weaver	Henry Smith	7,985
Greenback Party	James B. Weaver	Reuben May	7,984
Greenback Party	James B. Weaver	Edward W. Dwight	7,983
Greenback Party	James B. Weaver	William L. Utley	7,983
Greenback Party	James B. Weaver	Allen S. Perry	7,980
Anti-Masonic Party	John W. Phelps	Isaac Bancroft	91
Anti-Masonic Party	John W. Phelps	J. L. Barlow	91
Anti-Masonic Party	John W. Phelps	Enos Collins	91
Anti-Masonic Party	John W. Phelps	William Hamlin	91
Anti-Masonic Party	John W. Phelps	E. L. Harris	91
Anti-Masonic Party	John W. Phelps	C. R. Morseman	91
Anti-Masonic Party	John W. Phelps	Josiah Shaw	91
Anti-Masonic Party	John W. Phelps	L. Sperry	91
Anti-Masonic Party	John W. Phelps	Riley Wilder	91
Anti-Masonic Party	John W. Phelps	M. R. Britton	87 (Note: The Secretary of State's report gives Britton's total as 91 as with the other Anti-Masonic electors, but the original report of the Board of Canvassers gives Britton 87. The difference is the Board of Canvassers report gives Britton 26 votes in Walworth County as opposed to the 30 received by the other electors on that ticket.)
Prohibition Party	Neal Dow	Charles Irish	69
Prohibition Party	Neal Dow	R. Cooley	68
Prohibition Party	Neal Dow	H. Field	68
Prohibition Party	Neal Dow	G. W. Gilfillan	68
Prohibition Party	Neal Dow	J. M. Little	68
Prohibition Party	Neal Dow	B. J. Curtis	67
Prohibition Party	Neal Dow	Isaac C. Hardy	67
Prohibition Party	Neal Dow	Harvey Joiner	67
Prohibition Party	Neal Dow	William Mooney	67
Prohibition Party	Neal Dow	J. D. Seboski	62
Write-in		Scattering	19
Votes cast (Note: Based on totals for highest elector on each ticket)			267,214

=== Results by county ===
County	James A. Garfield Republican		Winfield S. Hancock Democratic		James B. Weaver Greenback		Other candidates (Note: These votes are for Phelps unless otherwise noted) Various parties		Margin		Total votes cast (Note: Based on highest elector on each ticket)
County	#	%	#	%	#	%	#	%	#	%	Total votes cast
Adams	994	72.08%	343	24.87%	40	2.90%	2 (Note: 2 Scattering)	0.15%	651	47.21%	1,379
Ashland	202	47.53%	223	52.47%	0	0.00%	0	0.00%	-21	-4.94%	425
Barron	1,027	71.82%	394	27.55%	9	0.63%	0	0.00%	633	44.27%	1,430
Bayfield	78	47.56%	86	52.44%	0	0.00%	0	0.00%	-8	-4.88%	164
Brown	2,681	46.02%	3,034	52.08%	111	1.91%	0	0.00%	-353	-6.06%	5,826
Buffalo	1,588	65.46%	837	34.50%	1	0.04%	0	0.00%	751	30.96%	2,426
Burnett	369	86.62%	57	13.38%	0	0.00%	0	0.00%	312	73.24%	426
Calumet	1,151	35.40%	1,991	61.24%	107	3.29%	2 (Note: 2 for Dow)	0.06%	-840	-25.84%	3,251
Chippewa	1,485	46.48%	1,512	47.32%	198	6.20%	0	0.00%	-27	-0.85%	3,195
Clark	1,541	68.49%	671	29.82%	38	1.69%	0	0.00%	870	38.67%	2,250
Columbia	3,572	60.20%	2,311	38.95%	36	0.61%	15	0.25%	1,261	21.15%	5,934
Crawford	1,415	46.45%	1,459	47.90%	172	5.65%	0	0.00%	-44	-1.44%	3,046
Dane	6,018	50.08%	5,800	48.26%	199	1.66%	0	0.00%	218	1.81%	12,017
Dodge	3,624	38.11%	5,708	60.02%	168	1.77%	10 (Note: 10 for Dow)	0.11%	-2,084	-21.91%	9,510
Door	1,357	62.88%	635	29.43%	166	7.69%	0	0.00%	722	33.46%	2,158
Douglas	41	35.04%	76	64.96%	0	0.00%	0	0.00%	-35	-29.91%	117
Dunn	2,421	70.13%	992	28.74%	32	0.93%	7	0.20%	1,429	41.40%	3,452
Eau Claire	2,336	58.23%	1,520	37.89%	153	3.81%	3	0.07%	816	20.34%	4,012
Fond du Lac	4,683	46.77%	4,851	48.45%	471	4.70%	8 (Note: 8 for Dow)	0.08%	-168	-1.68%	10,013
Grant	4,654	59.11%	3,038	38.58%	179	2.27%	3	0.04%	1,616	20.52%	7,874
Green	2,740	60.10%	1,526	33.47%	284	6.23%	9	0.20%	1,214	26.63%	4,559
Green Lake	1,764	58.05%	1,170	38.50%	105	3.46%	0	0.00%	594	19.55%	3,039
Iowa	2,674	52.80%	2,310	45.62%	79	1.56%	1 (Note: 1 for Dow)	0.02%	364	7.19%	5,064
Jackson	1,841	71.44%	673	26.12%	61	2.37%	2 (Note: 1 for Dow, 1 Scattering)	0.08%	1,168	45.32%	2,577
Jefferson	3,060	43.31%	3,923	55.53%	82	1.16%	0	0.00%	-863	-12.22%	7,065
Juneau	1,821	53.64%	1,453	42.80%	120	3.53%	1 (Note: 1 Scattering)	0.03%	368	10.84%	3,395
Kenosha	1,676	54.26%	1,411	45.68%	0	0.00%	2	0.06%	265	8.58%	3,089
Kewaunee	795	33.66%	1,567	66.34%	0	0.00%	0	0.00%	-772	-32.65%	2,362
La Crosse	2,731	56.23%	1,995	41.07%	131	2.70%	0	0.00%	736	15.15%	4,857
Lafayette	2,542	52.75%	2,182	45.28%	81	1.68%	14 (Note: 7 for Dow, 7 Scattering)	0.29%	360	7.47%	4,819
Lincoln	370	52.63%	262	37.27%	71	10.10%	0	0.00%	108	15.36%	703
Manitowoc	2,988	44.83%	3,676	55.15%	1	0.02%	0	0.00%	-688	-10.32%	6,665
Marathon	1,025	30.92%	1,977	59.64%	313	9.44%	0	0.00%	-952	-28.72%	3,315
Marinette	1,332	69.70%	579	30.30%	0	0.00%	0	0.00%	753	39.40%	1,911
Marquette	905	47.43%	984	51.57%	19	1.00%	0	0.00%	-79	-4.14%	1,908
Milwaukee	14,088	55.99%	10,997	43.71%	76	0.30%	0	0.00%	3,091	12.28%	25,161
Monroe	2,427	52.33%	1,913	41.25%	298	6.43%	0	0.00%	514	11.08%	4,638
Oconto	1,036	55.52%	822	44.05%	8	0.43%	0	0.00%	214	11.47%	1,866
Outagamie	2,124	37.38%	3,258	57.34%	300	5.28%	0	0.00%	-1,134	-19.96%	5,682
Ozaukee	805	27.33%	2,063	70.05%	77	2.61%	0	0.00%	-1,258	-42.72%	2,945
Pepin	939	75.73%	296	23.87%	5	0.40%	0	0.00%	643	51.85%	1,240
Pierce	2,320	70.26%	840	25.44%	142	4.30%	0	0.00%	1,480	44.82%	3,302
Polk	1,439	76.02%	453	23.93%	1	0.05%	0	0.00%	986	52.09%	1,893
Portage	1,952	54.89%	1,534	43.14%	69	1.94%	1	0.03%	418	11.75%	3,556
Price	142	42.26%	194	57.74%	0	0.00%	0	0.00%	-52	-15.48%	336
Racine	3,955	57.37%	2,867	41.59%	72	1.04%	0	0.00%	1,088	15.78%	6,894
Richland	2,260	55.83%	1,635	40.39%	151	3.73%	2	0.05%	625	15.44%	4,048
Rock	5,741	67.07%	2,646	30.91%	163	1.90%	10	0.12%	3,095	36.16%	8,560
Sauk	3,638	61.67%	2,081	35.28%	169	2.86%	11	0.19%	1,557	26.39%	5,899
Shawano	932	47.60%	968	49.44%	40	2.04%	18 (Note: 18 for Dow)	0.92%	-36	-1.84%	1,958
Sheboygan	3,251	47.90%	2,959	43.60%	577	8.50%	0	0.00%	292	4.30%	6,787
St. Croix	2,394	57.83%	1,719	41.52%	27	0.65%	0	0.00%	675	16.30%	4,140
Taylor	300	52.26%	274	47.74%	0	0.00%	0	0.00%	26	4.53%	574
Trempealeau	2,302	69.34%	676	20.36%	340	10.24%	2	0.06%	1,626	48.98%	3,320
Vernon	2,774	64.27%	1,014	23.49%	525	12.16%	3	0.07%	1,760	40.78%	4,316
Walworth	4,361	69.00%	1,886	29.84%	39	0.62%	34 (Note: 4 Scattering)	0.54%	2,475	39.16%	6,320
Washington	1,905	39.69%	2,838	59.13%	56	1.17%	1	0.02%	-933	-19.44%	4,800
Waukesha	3,321	51.79%	2,990	46.63%	101	1.58%	0	0.00%	331	5.16%	6,412
Waupaca	2,647	60.53%	1,440	32.93%	283	6.47%	3	0.07%	1,207	27.60%	4,373
Waushara	2,172	78.50%	509	18.40%	81	2.93%	5	0.18%	1,663	60.10%	2,767
Winnebago	4,762	52.35%	3,798	41.75%	526	5.78%	10 (Note: 9 for Dow, 1 Scattering)	0.11%	964	10.60%	9,096
Wood	912	43.47%	753	35.89%	433	20.64%	0	0.00%	159	7.58%	2,098
Total	144,400	54.04%	116,649	42.91%	7,986	2.99%	179	0.07%	29,751	11.13%	267,214

==== Counties that flipped from Democratic to Republican ====
- Dane
- Lincoln
- Milwaukee
- Sheboygan
- Taylor
- Waukesha
- Wood

==== Counties that flipped from Republican to Democratic ====
- Bayfield

== See also ==
- United States presidential elections in Wisconsin
