= Nelson La Due =

American politician

Nelson La Due was a member of the Wisconsin State Assembly.

== Biography ==
La Due was born on April 15, 1831, in Dutchess County, New York. He died on January 31, 1900.

== Career ==
La Due was a member of the Assembly in 1879. Other positions he held include Chairman of the county board of supervisors of Lafayette County, Wisconsin. He was a Republican.
