= 1864 United States presidential election in Wisconsin =

- November 8, 1864

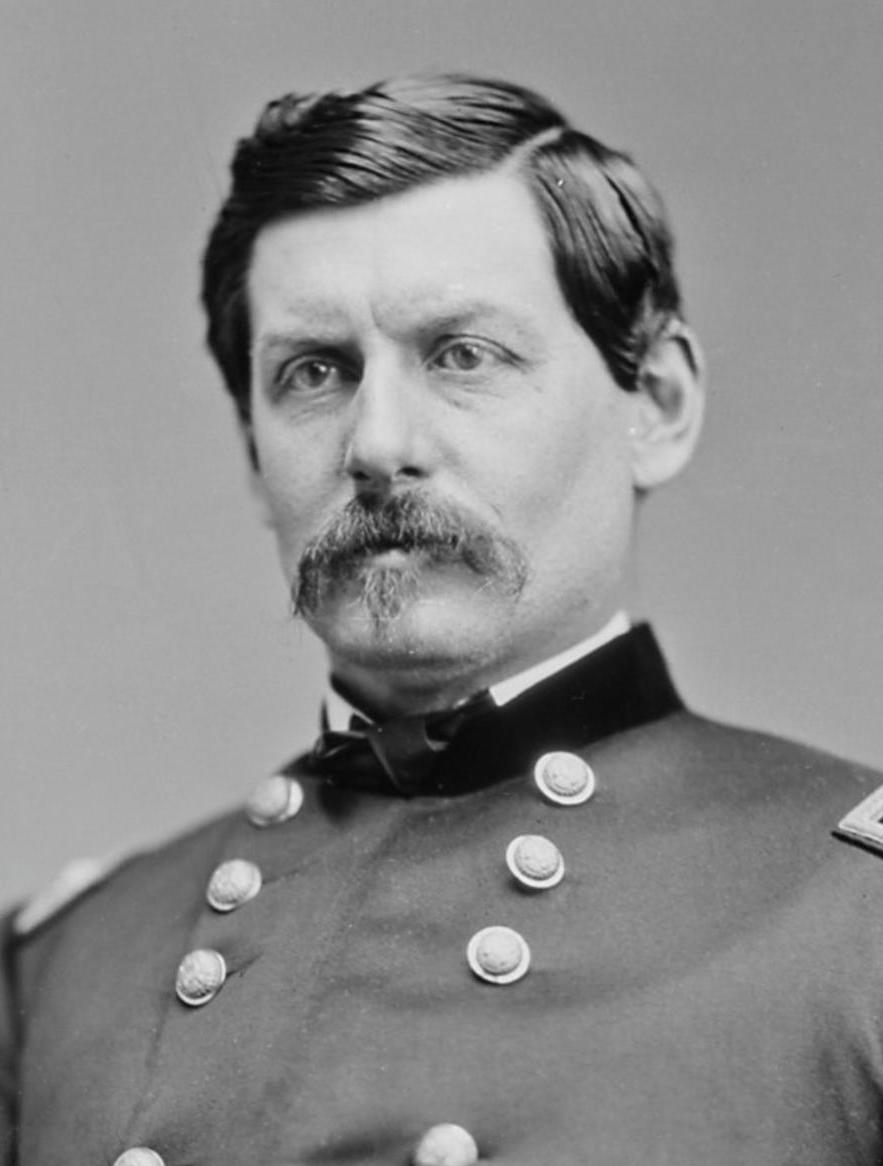
| Nominee | Abraham Lincoln | George B. McClellan |
| Party | National Union | Democratic |
| Home state | Illinois | New Jersey |
| Running mate | Andrew Johnson | George H. Pendleton |
| Electoral vote | 8 | 0 |
| Popular vote | 79,564 | 63,876 |
| Percentage | 55.31% | 44.40% |

Lincoln
50–60%
60–70%
70–80%
80–90%
McClellan
50–60%
60–70%
70–80%
80–90%
President before election
Abraham Lincoln
Republican
Elected President
Abraham Lincoln
National Union

The 1864 United States presidential election in Wisconsin was held on November 8, 1864, as part of the 1864 United States presidential election. State voters chose eight electors to the Electoral College, who voted for president and vice president.

Wisconsin would be won by the National Union Party candidate, incumbent Republican President Abraham Lincoln and his running mate Andrew Johnson. They defeated the Democratic candidate George B. McClellan and his running mate George H. Pendleton. Lincoln won the state by a margin of 13.20%.

This was the last election until 1912 in which a Democrat carried Lafayette County.

== Results ==
General Election Results
| Party | Pledged to | Elector | Votes |
|---|---|---|---|
| National Union | Abraham Lincoln | William W. Field | 79,564 |
| National Union | Abraham Lincoln | Henry L. Blood | 79,562 |
| National Union | Abraham Lincoln | George C. Northrop | 79,357 |
| National Union | Abraham Lincoln | Allen Warden | 79,355 |
| National Union | Abraham Lincoln | Alexander S. McDill | 79,328 |
| National Union | Abraham Lincoln | Henry F. Belitz | 79,270 |
| National Union | Abraham Lincoln | Henry J. Turner | 79,250 |
| National Union | Abraham Lincoln | Jonathan Bowman | 79,225 |
| Democratic Party | George B. McClellan | Theodore Rudolf | 63,876 |
| Democratic Party | George B. McClellan | Randall Wilcox | 63,875 |
| Democratic Party | George B. McClellan | Isaac W. Webster | 63,838 |
| Democratic Party | George B. McClellan | Frederick W. Horn | 63,810 |
| Democratic Party | George B. McClellan | Charles Morgan | 63,770 |
| Democratic Party | George B. McClellan | Garrit T. Thorne | 63,686 |
| Democratic Party | George B. McClellan | J. Stephens Tripp | 63,606 |
| Democratic Party | George B. McClellan | Harvey T. Ramsey | 63,451 |
| Write-in | | Scattering | 418 |
| Votes cast (Note: Based on totals for highest elector on each ticket) | | | 143,858 |

=== Results by county ===
| County | Abraham Lincoln National Union | | George B. McClellan Democratic | | Margin | | Total votes cast (Note: Based on highest elector on each ticket) |
| County | # | % | # | % | # | % | Total votes cast |
|---|---|---|---|---|---|---|---|
| Adams | 582 | 72.48% | 221 | 27.52% | 361 | 44.96% | 803 |
| Ashland (Note: The returns from this county did not arrive in time to be counted by the Board of Canvassers) | 14 | 32.56% | 29 | 67.44% | -15 | -34.88% | 43 |
| Brown | 730 | 36.21% | 1,286 | 63.79% | -556 | -27.58% | 2,016 |
| Buffalo | 597 | 67.76% | 284 | 32.24% | 313 | 35.53% | 881 |
| Calumet | 444 | 38.21% | 718 | 61.79% | -274 | -23.58% | 1,162 |
| Chippewa | 205 | 41.16% | 293 | 58.84% | -88 | -17.67% | 498 |
| Clark | 171 | 78.08% | 48 | 21.92% | 123 | 56.16% | 219 |
| Columbia | 2,652 | 64.14% | 1,483 | 35.86% | 1,169 | 28.27% | 4,135 |
| Crawford | 711 | 47.49% | 786 | 52.51% | -75 | -5.01% | 1,497 |
| Dane | 4,018 | 51.34% | 3,809 | 48.66% | 209 | 2.67% | 7,827 |
| Dodge | 3,226 | 40.71% | 4,698 | 59.29% | -1,472 | -18.58% | 7,924 |
| Door | 244 | 63.38% | 75 | 19.48% | 169 | 43.90% | 385 (Note: Includes 66 Scattering votes. 26 of these are 13 each for George McClellan and George Pendleton, the Democratic nominees for President and Vice President, respectively.) |
| Douglas | 37 | 35.58% | 67 | 64.42% | -30 | -28.85% | 104 |
| Dunn | 505 | 56.93% | 251 | 28.30% | 254 | 28.64% | 887 (Note: Includes 131 Scattering votes. These appear to have been intended for Union elector Turner.) |
| Eau Claire | 515 | 58.72% | 362 | 41.28% | 153 | 17.45% | 877 |
| Fond du Lac | 3,483 | 51.30% | 3,306 | 48.70% | 177 | 2.61% | 6,789 |
| Grant | 3,244 | 67.51% | 1,561 | 32.49% | 1,683 | 35.03% | 4,805 |
| Green | 2,017 | 64.56% | 1,107 | 35.44% | 910 | 29.13% | 3,124 |
| Green Lake | 1,441 | 74.01% | 506 | 25.99% | 935 | 48.02% | 1,947 |
| Iowa | 1,282 | 47.38% | 1,424 | 52.62% | -142 | -5.25% | 2,706 |
| Jackson | 680 | 76.66% | 207 | 23.34% | 473 | 53.33% | 887 |
| Jefferson | 2,157 | 44.03% | 2,742 | 55.97% | -585 | -11.94% | 4,899 |
| Juneau | 776 | 53.04% | 687 | 46.96% | 89 | 6.08% | 1,463 |
| Kenosha | 1,318 | 59.99% | 879 | 40.01% | 439 | 19.98% | 2,197 |
| Kewaunee (Note: The return from this county was rejected by the Board of Canvassers on account of informality) | 157 | 17.25% | 753 | 82.75% | -596 | -65.49% | 910 |
| La Crosse | 1,531 | 62.93% | 902 | 37.07% | 629 | 25.85% | 2,433 |
| La Pointe | 15 | 40.54% | 22 | 59.46% | -7 | -18.92% | 37 |
| Lafayette | 1,469 | 46.21% | 1,710 | 53.79% | -241 | -7.58% | 3,179 |
| Manitowoc | 1,179 | 34.40% | 2,248 | 65.60% | -1,069 | -31.19% | 3,427 |
| Marathon | 136 | 20.51% | 527 | 79.49% | -391 | -58.97% | 663 |
| Marquette | 437 | 40.24% | 649 | 59.76% | -212 | -19.52% | 1,086 |
| Milwaukee | 3,175 | 31.60% | 6,874 | 68.40% | -3,699 | -36.81% | 10,049 |
| Monroe | 1,160 | 64.12% | 649 | 35.88% | 511 | 28.25% | 1,809 |
| Oconto | 291 | 61.78% | 178 | 37.79% | 113 | 23.99% | 471 (Note: Includes 2 Scattering votes. These votes appear to have been intended for Union elector Belitz) |
| Outagamie | 651 | 39.70% | 989 | 60.30% | -338 | -20.61% | 1,640 |
| Ozaukee | 243 | 10.59% | 2,050 | 89.36% | -1,807 | -78.77% | 2,294 (Note: Includes 1 Scattering vote) |
| Pepin | 273 | 69.64% | 119 | 30.36% | 154 | 39.29% | 392 |
| Pierce | 656 | 66.80% | 326 | 33.20% | 330 | 33.60% | 982 |
| Polk | 176 | 62.19% | 107 | 37.81% | 69 | 24.38% | 283 |
| Portage | 704 | 69.36% | 311 | 30.64% | 393 | 38.72% | 1,015 |
| Racine | 2,034 | 55.30% | 1,644 | 44.70% | 390 | 10.60% | 3,678 |
| Richland | 1,020 | 61.00% | 652 | 39.00% | 368 | 22.01% | 1,672 |
| Rock | 4,367 | 74.03% | 1,532 | 25.97% | 2,835 | 48.06% | 5,899 |
| Sauk | 2,076 | 67.82% | 985 | 32.18% | 1,091 | 35.64% | 3,061 |
| Shawano | 134 | 58.01% | 97 | 41.99% | 37 | 16.02% | 231 |
| Sheboygan | 1,958 | 47.26% | 2,185 | 52.74% | -227 | -5.48% | 4,143 |
| St. Croix | 594 | 44.90% | 511 | 38.62% | 83 | 6.27% | 1,323 (Note: Includes 218 Scattering votes. 139 of these appear to have been intended for Democratic elector Thorne. 79 of these appear to have been intended for Union elector Belitz.) |
| Trempealeau | 573 | 80.25% | 141 | 19.75% | 432 | 60.50% | 714 |
| Vernon | 1,336 | 74.85% | 449 | 25.15% | 887 | 49.69% | 1,785 |
| Walworth | 3,455 | 74.35% | 1,192 | 25.65% | 2,263 | 48.70% | 4,647 |
| Washington | 658 | 18.37% | 2,923 | 81.63% | -2,265 | -63.25% | 3,581 |
| Waukesha | 2,009 | 47.78% | 2,196 | 52.22% | -187 | -4.45% | 4,205 |
| Waupaca | 1,139 | 67.84% | 540 | 32.16% | 599 | 35.68% | 1,679 |
| Waushara | 1,053 | 78.88% | 282 | 21.12% | 771 | 57.75% | 1,335 |
| Winnebago | 2,923 | 62.26% | 1,772 | 37.74% | 1,151 | 24.52% | 4,695 |
| Wood | 247 | 49.90% | 248 | 50.10% | -1 | -0.20% | 495 |
| Soldiers (Note: A sizeable fraction of the Soldier vote was rejected. The figures here are the ones that were counted by the Board of Canvassers. The rejected Soldier vote was 2,477 for Lincoln and 584 for McClellan.) | 11,372 | 82.41% | 2,428 | 17.59% | 8,944 | 64.81% | 13,800 |
| Total (Note: Does not include the late votes from Adams and Eau Claire counties, the rejected vote from Kewaunee County, and the rejected Soldier votes.) | 79,564 | 55.31% | 63,876 | 44.40% | 15,688 | 10.91% | 143,858 |

==== Counties that flipped from Republican to Democratic ====
- Ashland
- Calumet
- Chippewa
- Douglas
- Iowa
- Jefferson
- La Pointe
- Manitowoc
- Sheboygan
- Waukesha
- Wood

== See also ==
- United States presidential elections in Wisconsin
