= 1872 United States presidential election in Wisconsin =

- November 5, 1872
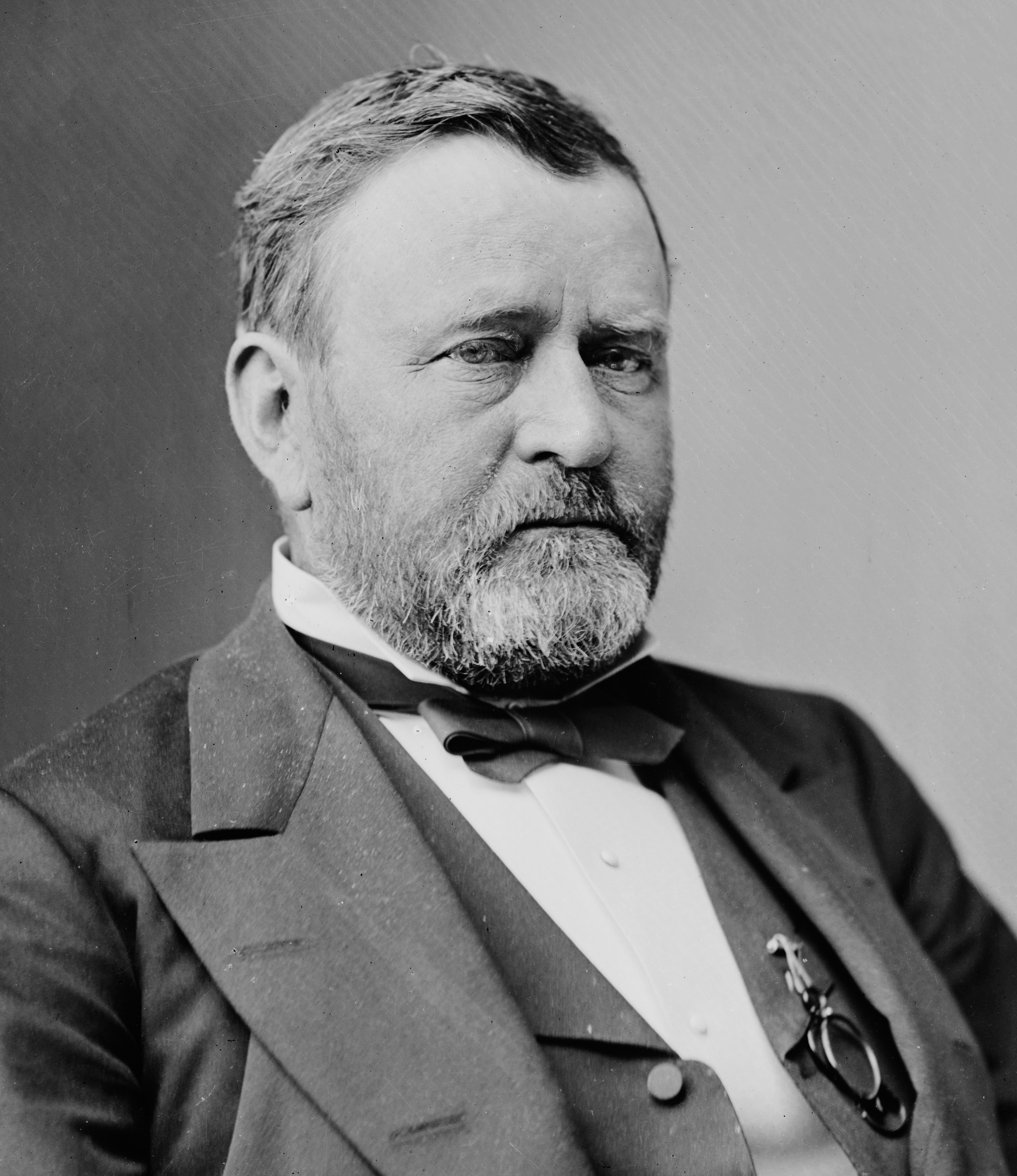

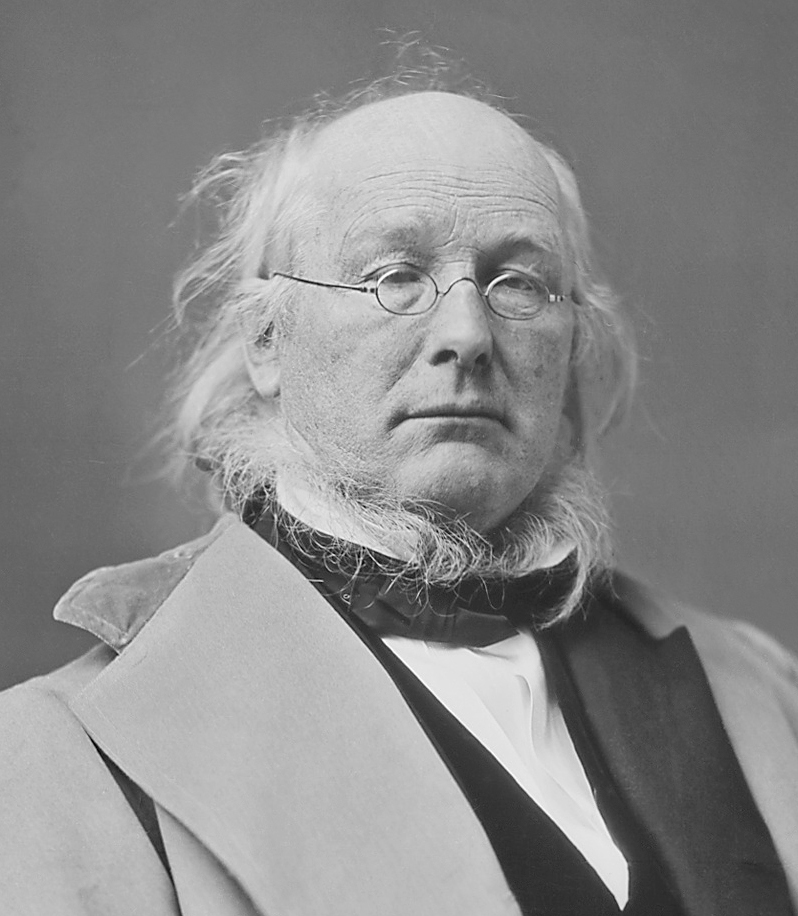
Nominee	Ulysses S. Grant	Horace Greeley
Party	Republican	Liberal Republican
Home state	Illinois	New York
Running mate	Henry Wilson	Benjamin G. Brown
Electoral vote	10	0
Popular vote	104,992	86,477
Percentage	54.60%	44.97%
County results
Grant
50–60%
60–70%
70–80%
80–90%
90–100%
Greeley
40–50%
50–60%
60–70%
70–80%
President before election
Ulysses S. Grant
Republican
Elected President
Ulysses S. Grant
Republican

The 1872 United States presidential election in Wisconsin was held on November 5, 1872, as part of the 1872 United States presidential election. State voters chose ten electors to the Electoral College, who voted for president and vice president.

Republican Party candidate and incumbent President Ulysses S. Grant won Wisconsin with 54.60% of the popular vote, winning the state's ten electoral votes.

Horace Greeley was the last Democrat (Note: Greeley was on the Liberal Republican ticket in Wisconsin) until Franklin D. Roosevelt in 1932 to win Buffalo County.

== Results ==
General Election Results
Party	Pledged to	Elector	Votes
Republican Party	Ulysses S. Grant	Edward C. McFetridge	104,992
Republican Party	Ulysses S. Grant	F. Fleischer	104,990
Republican Party	Ulysses S. Grant	Frederick Hilgen	104,990
Republican Party	Ulysses S. Grant	Romanzo Bunn	104,989
Republican Party	Ulysses S. Grant	Jerome S. Nickles	104,989
Republican Party	Ulysses S. Grant	George G. Swain	104,989
Republican Party	Ulysses S. Grant	Henry D. Barron	104,988
Republican Party	Ulysses S. Grant	Ormsby B. Thomas	104,988
Republican Party	Ulysses S. Grant	William E. Cramer	104,987
Republican Party	Ulysses S. Grant	George E. Hoskinson	104,986
Liberal Republican Party	Horace Greeley	Mons Anderson	86,477
Liberal Republican Party	Horace Greeley	Milton Montgomery	86,477
Liberal Republican Party	Horace Greeley	Amasa G. Cook	86,476
Liberal Republican Party	Horace Greeley	Robert H. Hotchkiss	86,475
Liberal Republican Party	Horace Greeley	George H. King	86,474
Liberal Republican Party	Horace Greeley	Wyman Spooner	86,474
Liberal Republican Party	Horace Greeley	Matthew Wadleigh	86,474
Liberal Republican Party	Horace Greeley	Samuel Rindskopf	86,472
Liberal Republican Party	Horace Greeley	Anton Klaus	86,460
Liberal Republican Party	Horace Greeley	John Black	86,310
Write-in		Scattering (Note: Based on reporting in newspapers at the time, it appears that these votes were intended for Straight-Out Democratic Party electors. However, the canvass does not list any names for O'Conor electors. All of these votes are simply listed as "Scattering" in a single column.)	834
Votes cast (Note: Based on totals for highest elector on each ticket)			192,303

=== Results by county ===
County	Ulysses S. Grant Republican		Horace Greeley Liberal Republican		Charles O'Conor (Note: Listed as "Scattering" on the official canvass) Straight-Out Democratic		Margin		Total votes cast (Note: Based on highest elector on each ticket)
County	#	%	#	%	#	%	#	%	Total votes cast
Adams	885	79.09%	233	20.82%	1	0.09%	652	58.27%	1,119
Ashland	86	66.67%	43	33.33%	0	0.00%	43	33.33%	129
Barron	120	75.95%	38	24.05%	0	0.00%	82	51.90%	158
Bayfield	89	67.94%	42	32.06%	0	0.00%	47	35.88%	131
Brown	2,694	54.98%	2,185	44.59%	21	0.43%	509	10.39%	4,900
Buffalo	842	48.59%	861	49.68%	30	1.73%	-19	-1.10%	1,733
Burnett	160	95.81%	7	4.19%	0	0.00%	153	91.62%	167
Calumet	757	36.48%	1,313	63.28%	5	0.24%	-556	-26.80%	2,075
Chippewa	1,025	57.75%	750	42.25%	0	0.00%	275	15.49%	1,775
Clark	801	86.97%	118	12.81%	2	0.22%	683	74.16	921
Columbia	3,070	62.45%	1,835	37.33%	11	0.22%	1,235	25.12%	4,916
Crawford	1,162	49.94%	1,151	49.46%	14	0.60%	11	0.47%	2,327
Dane	5,142	51.77%	4,788	48.20%	3	0.03%	354	3.56%	9,933
Dodge	3,051	35.17%	5,622	64.80%	3	0.03%	-2,571	-29.63%	8,676
Door	873	80.31%	214	19.69%	0	0.00%	659	60.63%	1,087
Douglas	72	42.86%	96	57.14%	0	0.00%	-24	-14.29%	168
Dunn	1,390	73.54%	498	26.35%	2	0.11%	892	47.20%	1,890
Eau Claire	1,615	66.43%	816	33.57%	0	0.00%	799	32.87%	2,431
Fond du Lac	4,292	49.10%	4,430	50.68%	19	0.22%	138	1.58%	8,741
Grant	4,307	64.84%	2,318	34.89%	17	0.26%	1,989	29.94%	6,643
Green	2,450	65.70%	1,246	33.41%	33	0.88%	1,204	32.29%	3,729
Green Lake	1,541	59.57%	1,045	40.39%	1	0.04%	496	19.17%	2,587
Iowa	2,078	51.03%	1,978	48.58%	16	0.39%	100	2.46%	4,072
Jackson	956	72.75%	358	27.25%	0	0.00%	598	45.51%	1,314
Jefferson	2,579	41.49%	3,559	57.26%	78	1.25%	-980	-15.77%	6,216
Juneau	1,421	57.09%	1,068	42.91%	0	0.00%	353	14.18%	2,489
Kenosha	1,408	53.68%	1,215	46.32%	0	0.00%	193	7.36%	2,623
Kewaunee	503	33.20%	1,012	66.80%	0	0.00%	-509	-33.60%	1,515
La Crosse	2,178	52.33%	1,965	47.21%	19	0.46%	213	5.12%	4,162
Lafayette	2,081	50.89%	1,909	46.69%	99	0.42%	172	4.21%	4,089
Manitowoc	2,289	46.09%	2,677	53.91%	0	0.00%	-388	-7.81%	4,966
Marathon	491	34.10%	911	63.26%	38	2.64%	-420	-29.17%	1,440
Marquette	643	41.40%	910	58.60%	0	0.00%	-267	-17.19%	1,553
Milwaukee	5,835	40.65%	8,512	59.30%	7	0.05%	-2,677	-18.65%	14,354
Monroe	2,117	59.53%	1,425	40.07%	14	0.39%	692	19.46%	3,556
Oconto	1,077	71.90%	396	26.44%	25	1.67%	681	45.46%	1,498
Outagamie	1,535	43.73%	1,970	56.13%	5	0.14%	-435	-12.39%	3,510
Ozaukee	574	25.30%	1,594	70.25%	101	4.45%	-1,020	-44.95%	2,269
Pepin	644	69.92%	272	29.53%	5	0.54%	372	40.39%	921
Pierce	1,460	68.38%	634	29.70%	41	1.92%	826	38.69%	2,135
Polk	659	77.62%	189	22.26%	1	0.12%	470	55.36%	849
Portage	1,536	65.81%	798	34.19%	0	0.00%	738	31.62%	2,334
Racine	2,880	57.82%	2,100	42.16%	1	0.02%	780	15.66%	4,981
Richland	1,675	61.42%	999	36.63%	53	1.94%	676	24.79%	2,727
Rock	5,138	74.47%	1,740	25.22%	21	0.30%	3,398	49.25%	6,899
Sauk	2,702	66.58%	1,354	33.37%	2	0.05%	1,348	33.22%	4,058
Shawano	416	47.27%	464	52.73%	0	0.00%	-48	-5.45%	880
Sheboygan	2,687	47.67%	2,948	52.30%	2	0.04%	-261	-4.63%	5,637
St. Croix	1,373	53.57%	1,190	46.43%	0	0.00%	183	7.14%	2,563
Trempealeau	1,457	77.71%	417	22.24%	1	0.05%	1,040	55.47%	1,875
Vernon	2,445	81.66%	542	18.10%	7	0.23%	1,903	63.56%	2,994
Walworth	3,512	69.82%	1,499	29.80%	19	0.38%	2,013	40.02%	5,030
Washington	947	25.78%	2,727	74.22%	0	0.00%	-1,780	-48.45%	3,674
Waukesha	2,671	49.47%	2,720	50.38%	8	0.15%	-49	-0.91%	5,399
Waupaca	2,050	68.42%	945	31.54%	1	0.03%	1,105	36.88%	2,996
Waushara	1,708	80.38%	389	18.31%	28	1.32%	1,319	62.07%	2,125
Winnebago	4,280	59.04%	2,969	40.96%	0	0.00%	1,311	18.09%	7,249
Wood	563	50.45%	473	42.38%	80	7.17%	90	8.06%	1,116
Total	104,992	54.60%	86,477	44.97%	834	0.43%	18,515	9.63%	192,303

==== Counties that flipped from Democratic to Republican ====
- Ashland
- Bayfield
- Brown
- Chippewa
- Crawford
- Wood

==== Counties that flipped from Republican to Liberal Republican ====
- Buffalo
- Fond du Lac
- Shawano
- Sheboygan

== See also ==
- United States presidential elections in Wisconsin
