= List of counties in Wisconsin =

Counties of Wisconsin
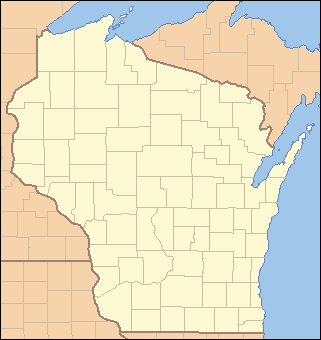
- Location: State of Wisconsin
- Number: 72
- Populations: 4,199 (Menominee) – 924,216 (Milwaukee)
- Areas: 231.98 square miles (600.8 km^{2}) (Pepin) – 1,544.91 square miles (4,001.3 km^{2}) (Marathon)
- Government: County government
- Subdivisions: Cities, villages, towns, communities

There are 72 counties in the US state of Wisconsin. The land that eventually became Wisconsin was transferred from British to American control with the 1783 signing of the Treaty of Paris. It was an unorganized part of the Northwest Territory until 1802 when all of the land from St. Louis north to the Canadian border was organized as St. Clair County. When Illinois was admitted to the union in 1818, Wisconsin became part of the Territory of Michigan and divided into two counties: Brown County in the northeast along Lake Michigan and Crawford County in the southwest along the Mississippi River. Iowa County was formed in 1829 from the Crawford County land south of the Wisconsin River. Brown County's southern portion was used to form Milwaukee County in 1834. The state of Wisconsin was created from Wisconsin Territory on May 29, 1848, with 28 counties.

The most populous county in the state is Milwaukee County at 924,216 people at the 2025 Census estimate. The county with the least population is Menominee County with 4,199 residents; the Menominee Indian Reservation is co-extensive with the county. Pepin County is the smallest in area, with 231.98 square miles (600.8 km^{2}); Marathon is the largest, having 1,544.91 square miles (4,001.3 km^{2}).

The Federal Information Processing Standard (FIPS) code, which is used by the United States government to uniquely identify states and counties, is provided with each entry. Wisconsin's code is 55, which when combined with any county code would be written as 55XXX. The FIPS code for each county links to census data for that county.

== Governance ==
Each county has a county seat, often a populous or centrally located community, where the county's governmental offices are located. Some of the services provided by the county include: law enforcement, circuit courts, social services, vital records and deed registration, road maintenance, and snow removal. County officials include sheriffs, district attorneys, clerks, treasurers, coroners, surveyors, registers of deeds, and clerks of circuit court; these officers are elected for four-year terms. In most counties, elected coroners have been replaced by appointed medical examiners. State law permits counties to appoint a registered land surveyor in place of electing a surveyor.

Counties in Wisconsin are governed by county boards, headed by a chairperson. Counties with a population of 500,000 or more must also have a county executive. Smaller counties may have either a county executive or a county administrator. As of 2011, 13 counties had elected county executives: Brown, Chippewa, Dane, Fond du Lac, Kenosha, Manitowoc, Milwaukee, Outagamie, Portage, Racine, Sawyer, Waukesha, and Winnebago. 23 had an appointed county administrator, 34 had an appointed administrative coordinator, and 2 had neither an executive nor an administrator. Waukesha County had both an executive and an administrator.

== List of counties ==
County	FIPS code	County seat	Density (/km²)	Est.	Formed from	Etymology	Population	Area	Map
Adams County	001	Friendship	12.77	March 11, 1848	Portage County	John Quincy Adams (1767–1848), President of the United States (1825–29)	21,752	645.65 sq mi (1,672 km^{2})	State map highlighting Adams County
Ashland County	003	Ashland	5.98	June 5, 1860	La Pointe County	Ashland, Henry Clay's estate in Kentucky	16,203	1,045.04 sq mi (2,707 km^{2})	State map highlighting Ashland County
Barron County	005	Barron	20.95	March 19, 1859	Polk County	Henry D. Barron, state senator and circuit court judge.	46,484	862.71 sq mi (2,234 km^{2})	State map highlighting Barron County
Bayfield County	007	Washburn	4.40	February 19, 1845	St. Croix County	Henry Bayfield, Royal naval officer and first to survey Great Lakes area	16,787	1,477.86 sq mi (3,828 km^{2})	State map highlighting Bayfield County
Brown County	009	Green Bay	199.65	December 3, 1818	unorganized territory	Major General Jacob Brown (1775–1828), commanding general of the United States Army during the War of 1812	275,803	529.71 sq mi (1,372 km^{2})	State map highlighting Brown County
Buffalo County	011	Alma	7.74	July 6, 1853	Jackson County	The Buffalo River, which flows through the county.	13,318	671.64 sq mi (1,740 km^{2})	State map highlighting Buffalo County
Burnett County	013	Siren	8.07	March 31, 1856	Polk County	Thomas P. Burnett, state legislator	17,223	821.85 sq mi (2,129 km^{2})	State map highlighting Burnett County
Calumet County	015	Chilton	65.03	December 7, 1836	Brown County	The French word for a Menominee Ceremonial pipe.	53,982	318.24 sq mi (824 km^{2})	State map highlighting Calumet County
Chippewa County	017	Chippewa Falls	25.78	February 3, 1845	Crawford County	Chippewa Indians	67,614	1,008.37 sq mi (2,612 km^{2})	State map highlighting Chippewa County
Clark County	019	Neillsville	11.11	July 6, 1853	Crawford County	George Rogers Clark (1752–1812), Revolutionary War general	35,052	1,209.82 sq mi (3,133 km^{2})	State map highlighting Clark County
Columbia County	021	Portage	29.31	May 1, 1846	Portage County	Christopher Columbus (1451–1506), navigator and explorer	58,132	765.53 sq mi (1,983 km^{2})	State map highlighting Columbia County
Crawford County	023	Prairie du Chien	10.83	December 3, 1818	unorganized territory	William Harris Crawford (1772–1834), United States Senator from Georgia (1807–13) and Secretary of the Treasury (1816–25)	15,910	570.66 sq mi (1,478 km^{2})	State map highlighting Crawford County
Dane County	025	Madison	189.74	December 7, 1836	Crawford, Iowa, and Milwaukee Counties	Nathan Dane (1752–1835), delegate to the First Continental Congress (1785–88)	590,375	1,197.24 sq mi (3,101 km^{2})	State map highlighting Dane County
Dodge County	027	Juneau	39.08	December 7, 1848	Brown and Milwaukee Counties	Henry Dodge (1782–1867), Territorial Governor of Wisconsin (1845–48)	89,097	875.63 sq mi (2,268 km^{2})	State map highlighting Dodge County
Door County	029	Sturgeon Bay	24.44	February 11, 1851	Brown County	A dangerous water passage near Door Peninsula known as Porte des Morts or "door of the dead" in French	30,616	481.98 sq mi (1,248 km^{2})	State map highlighting Door County
Douglas County	031	Superior	13.11	February 9, 1854	La Pointe County	Stephen Douglas (1813–61), United States Senator from Illinois (1847–61)	43,990	1,304.14 sq mi (3,378 km^{2})	State map highlighting Douglas County
Dunn County	033	Menomonie	20.95	February 3, 1854	Chippewa County	Charles Dunn, state senator and chief justice of Wisconsin Territory	46,223	850.11 sq mi (2,202 km^{2})	State map highlighting Dunn County
Eau Claire County	035	Eau Claire	65.86	January 2, 1857	Chippewa County	City of Eau Claire; French for "clear water"	109,033	637.98 sq mi (1,652 km^{2})	State map highlighting Eau Claire County
Florence County	037	Florence	3.69	April 1, 1882	Marinette and Oconto Counties	Florence Hulst (1851-1942), the first white woman to settle in the area	4,748	488.20 sq mi (1,264 km^{2})	State map highlighting Florence County
Fond du Lac County	039	Fond du Lac	55.95	December 7, 1836	Brown County	French for "bottom of the lake"	104,669	719.55 sq mi (1,864 km^{2})	State map highlighting Fond du Lac County
Forest County	041	Crandon	3.62	April 14, 1885	Langlade and Oconto Counties	Forest which covered the area when it was settled	9,574	1,014.07 sq mi (2,626 km^{2})	State map highlighting Forest County
Grant County	043	Lancaster	17.62	March 4, 1837	Iowa County	Probably a trader named Grant who made contact with area natives in 1810 but about whom little else is known	52,446	1,146.85 sq mi (2,970 km^{2})	State map highlighting Grant County
Green County	045	Monroe	24.58	March 4, 1837	Iowa County and unorganized territory	Nathanael Greene (1742–86), quartermaster general during the American Revolutionary War	37,227	583.96 sq mi (1,512 km^{2})	State map highlighting Green County
Green Lake County	047	Green Lake	21.40	June 8, 1858	Marquette County	Green Lake located within the county	19,305	349.44 sq mi (905 km^{2})	State map highlighting Green Lake County
Iowa County	049	Dodgeville	12.13	January 1, 1830	Crawford County	Iowa tribe of Indians	23,951	762.58 sq mi (1,975 km^{2})	State map highlighting Iowa County
Iron County	051	Hurley	3.17	March 3, 1893	Ashland and Oneida Counties	Local iron deposits	6,127	758.17 sq mi (1,964 km^{2})	State map highlighting Iron County
Jackson County	053	Black River Falls	8.22	March 1, 1853	La Crosse County	Andrew Jackson (1767–1845), President of the United States (1829–37)	20,999	987.72 sq mi (2,558 km^{2})	State map highlighting Jackson County
Jefferson County	055	Jefferson	59.84	December 7, 1836	Milwaukee County	Thomas Jefferson (1743–1826), President of the United States (1801–09)	86,505	556.47 sq mi (1,441 km^{2})	State map highlighting Jefferson County
Juneau County	057	Mauston	13.39	January 1, 1857	Adams County	Solomon Juneau (1793–1856), founder of what would become Milwaukee	26,649	766.93 sq mi (1,986 km^{2})	State map highlighting Juneau County
Kenosha County	059	Kenosha	239.55	January 30, 1850	Racine County	Indian word meaning "place of the pike"	168,448	271.99 sq mi (704 km^{2})	State map highlighting Kenosha County
Kewaunee County	061	Kewaunee	23.39	April 16, 1852	Door County	Either a Potawatomi word meaning "river of the lost" or an Ojibwe word meaning "prairie hen" "wild duck" or "to go around"	20,758	342.52 sq mi (887 km^{2})	State map highlighting Kewaunee County
La Crosse County	063	La Crosse	103.48	May 19, 1851	Crawford County	Indian game of lacrosse	121,339	451.69 sq mi (1,170 km^{2})	State map highlighting La Crosse County
Lafayette County	065	Darlington	10.54	May 1, 1847	Iowa County	Gilbert du Motier marquis de La Fayette (1757–1834), a French general in the American Revolutionary War	17,478	633.59 sq mi (1,641 km^{2})	State map highlighting Lafayette County
Langlade County	067	Antigo	8.66	March 3, 1879	Oconto County	Charles de Langlade (1729 – c. 1800), American Revolutionary War veteran and United States Indian Agent in Green Bay	19,534	870.64 sq mi (2,255 km^{2})	State map highlighting Langlade County
Lincoln County	069	Merrill	12.50	January 1, 1875	Marathon County	Abraham Lincoln (1809–65), President of the United States (1861–65)	28,403	878.97 sq mi (2,277 km^{2})	State map highlighting Lincoln County
Manitowoc County	071	Manitowoc	53.42	December 7, 1836	Brown County	Munedoo-owk, an Ojibwe word meaning "the place of the good spirit"	81,710	589.08 sq mi (1,526 km^{2})	State map highlighting Manitowoc County
Marathon County	073	Wausau	34.76	February 16, 1850	Portage County	Marathon, Greece	139,432	1,544.98 sq mi (4,001 km^{2})	State map highlighting Marathon County
Marinette County	075	Marinette	11.68	March 3, 1879	Oconto County	Marie Antoinette Chevalier, Indian wife of an early fur trapper	42,574	1,399.35 sq mi (3,624 km^{2})	State map highlighting Marinette County
Marquette County	077	Montello	13.34	December 7, 1836	Brown County	Jacques Marquette (1637–75), missionary and explorer	15,927	455.60 sq mi (1,180 km^{2})	State map highlighting Marquette County
Menominee County	078	Keshena	4.63	May 1, 1961	Menominee Indian Reservation, Shawano, and Oconto Counties	Menominee Indians	4,199	357.61 sq mi (926 km^{2})	State map highlighting Menominee County
Milwaukee County	079	Milwaukee	1479.05	September 6, 1834	Brown County	Mahnawaukee-Seepe, an Indian word meaning "gathering place by the river"	924,216	241.40 sq mi (625 km^{2})	State map highlighting Milwaukee County
Monroe County	081	Sparta	19.88	March 21, 1854	La Crosse County	James Monroe (1758–1831), President of the United States (1817–25)	46,572	900.78 sq mi (2,333 km^{2})	State map highlighting Monroe County
Oconto County	083	Oconto	15.49	February 6, 1851	Brown County	An Indian settlement and the Oconto River, whose name means "plentiful with fish"	40,195	997.99 sq mi (2,585 km^{2})	State map highlighting Oconto County
Oneida County	085	Rhinelander	13.24	January 1, 1887	Lincoln County	Oneida Indians	38,131	1,112.97 sq mi (2,883 km^{2})	State map highlighting Oneida County
Outagamie County	087	Appleton	118.33	February 17, 1851	Brown County	Outagamie Indians	195,894	637.52 sq mi (1,651 km^{2})	State map highlighting Outagamie County
Ozaukee County	089	Port Washington	155.64	March 7, 1853	Washington County	The Ojibwe word for the Sauk nation	94,346	233.08 sq mi (604 km^{2})	State map highlighting Ozaukee County
Pepin County	091	Durand	12.58	March 4, 1858	Dunn County	Pierre and Jean Pepin du Chardonnets, explorers	7,513	231.98 sq mi (601 km^{2})	State map highlighting Pepin County
Pierce County	093	Ellsworth	29.19	March 14, 1853	Saint Croix County	Franklin Pierce (1804–69), President of the United States (1853–57)	43,519	573.75 sq mi (1,486 km^{2})	State map highlighting Pierce County
Polk County	095	Balsam Lake	19.36	March 14, 1853	Saint Croix County	James Polk (1795–1849), President of the United States (1845–49)	45,803	913.96 sq mi (2,367 km^{2})	State map highlighting Polk County
Portage County	097	Stevens Point	34.74	December 7, 1836	Brown, Crawford, Iowa, and Milwaukee Counties	Passage between the Fox and Wisconsin Rivers	71,943	800.68 sq mi (2,074 km^{2})	State map highlighting Portage County
Price County	099	Phillips	4.34	March 3, 1879	Chippewa and Lincoln Counties	William T. Price (1824–86), Representative from Wisconsin (1883–86)	13,988	1,254.38 sq mi (3,249 km^{2})	State map highlighting Price County
Racine County	101	Racine	230.68	December 7, 1836	Milwaukee County	Racine, the French word for "root", after the Root River, which flows through the county	198,919	332.5 sq mi (861 km^{2})	State map highlighting Racine County
Richland County	103	Richland Center	11.28	February 18, 1842	Iowa County	The rich soil of the area	17,036	586.15 sq mi (1,518 km^{2})	State map highlighting Richland County
Rock County	105	Janesville	88.96	December 7, 1836	Milwaukee County	Rock River, which flows through the county	166,472	718.14 sq mi (1,860 km^{2})	State map highlighting Rock County
Rusk County	107	Ladysmith	5.99	May 24, 1901	Chippewa County	Jeremiah McLain Rusk (1830–93), Governor of Wisconsin (1882–89)	14,146	913.59 sq mi (2,366 km^{2})	State map highlighting Rusk County
Sauk County	111	Baraboo	30.90	January 11, 1840	Crawford, Dane and Portage Counties	Sauk Indians	66,652	830.9 sq mi (2,152 km^{2})	State map highlighting Sauk County
Sawyer County	113	Hayward	5.78	March 13, 1883	Ashland and Chippewa Counties	Philetus Sawyer (1816–1900), Representative (1865–75) and Senator (1881–93) from Wisconsin	18,846	1,257.31 sq mi (3,256 km^{2})	State map highlighting Sawyer County
Shawano County	115	Shawano	17.85	February 16, 1853	Oconto County	An Ojibwe word meaning "southern"	41,560	893.06 sq mi (2,313 km^{2})	State map highlighting Shawano County
Sheboygan County	117	Sheboygan	89.36	December 7, 1836	Brown County	Shawb-wa-way-kun, an Indian word meaning "great noise underground"	118,047	511.27 sq mi (1,324 km^{2})	State map highlighting Sheboygan County
St. Croix County	109	Hudson	52.36	August 3, 1840	Crawford County, and unorganized territory	An early French explorer named St. Croix, about whom little is known	97,954	722.33 sq mi (1,871 km^{2})	State map highlighting St. Croix County
Taylor County	119	Medford	7.99	March 9, 1875	Clark, Lincoln, Marathon and Chippewa Counties	William Robert Taylor (1820–1909), Governor of Wisconsin 1874–76	20,118	974.88 sq mi (2,525 km^{2})	State map highlighting Taylor County
Trempealeau County	121	Whitehall	16.22	January 27, 1854	Buffalo, Chippewa, Jackson, and La Crosse Counties	Trempealeau Mountain (from the French for "mountain with its foot in the water"), a bluff located in a bend of the Trempealeau River, which flows through the county	31,171	732.97 sq mi (1,898 km^{2})	State map highlighting Trempealeau County
Vernon County	123	Viroqua	15.29	May 19, 1851	Richland and Crawford Counties	Mount Vernon, home of George Washington	31,443	791.58 sq mi (2,050 km^{2})	State map highlighting Vernon County
Vilas County	125	Eagle River	10.79	April 15, 1893	Oneida County	William Vilas (1840–1908), officer in the Civil War United States Postmaster General (1885–88) United States Secretary of the Interior (1888–89) and Senator from Wisconsin (1891–97)	23,761	856.60 sq mi (2,219 km^{2})	State map highlighting Vilas County
Walworth County	127	Elkhorn	73.75	December 7, 1836	Milwaukee County	Reuben Hyde Walworth (1788–1867), jurist from New York	106,127	555.13 sq mi (1,438 km^{2})	State map highlighting Walworth County
Washburn County	129	Shell Lake	8.22	April 7, 1883	Burnett County	Cadwallader Washburn (1818–82), Governor (1872–74) and Representative from Wisconsin (1867–71)	17,087	797.11 sq mi (2,065 km^{2})	State map highlighting Washburn County
Washington County	131	West Bend	124.36	December 7, 1836	Brown and Milwaukee Counties	George Washington (1732–99), American Revolutionary War leader (1775–83) and first President of the United States (1789–97)	139,238	430.70 sq mi (1,116 km^{2})	State map highlighting Washington County
Waukesha County	133	Waukesha	292.99	April 9, 1846	Milwaukee County	Waugooshance, a Pottawatomi word meaning "little foxes"	417,210	549.57 sq mi (1,423 km^{2})	State map highlighting Waukesha County
Waupaca County	135	Waupaca	26.42	February 17, 1851	Brown and Winnebago Counties	wau-pa-ka-ho-nak, a Menominee word meaning "white sand bottom" or "brave young hero"	51,461	747.71 sq mi (1,937 km^{2})	State map highlighting Waupaca County
Waushara County	137	Wautoma	15.46	February 15, 1851	Marquette County	An Indian word meaning "good earth"	25,223	626.15 sq mi (1,622 km^{2})	State map highlighting Waushara County
Winnebago County	139	Oshkosh	154.00	January 6, 1840	Brown, Calumet, and Fond du Lac Counties	Winnebago Indians	174,218	434.49 sq mi (1,125 km^{2})	State map highlighting Winnebago County
Wood County	141	Wisconsin Rapids	35.99	March 29, 1856	Portage County	Joseph Wood (1809–90), state legislator (1856–58)	74,060	793.12 sq mi (2,054 km^{2})	State map highlighting Wood County

Comma Separated List of Wisconsin Counties:

Adams, Ashland, Barron, Bayfield, Brown, Buffalo, Burnett, Calumet, Chippewa, Clark, Columbia, Crawford, Dane, Dodge, Door, Douglas, Dunn, Eau Claire, Florence, Fond du Lac, Forest, Grant, Green, Green Lake, Iowa, Iron, Jackson, Jefferson, Juneau, Kenosha, Kewaunee, La Crosse, Lafayette, Langlade, Lincoln, Manitowoc, Marathon, Marinette, Marquette, Menominee, Milwaukee, Monroe, Oconto, Oneida, Outagamie, Ozaukee, Pepin, Pierce, Polk, Portage, Price, Racine, Richland, Rock, Rusk, Sauk, Sawyer, Shawano, Sheboygan, St. Croix, Taylor, Trempealeau, Vernon, Vilas, Walworth, Washburn, Washington, Waukesha, Waupaca, Waushara, Winnebago, Wood

== Racial / Ethnic Profile of counties in Wisconsin (2020 Census) ==
Racial / Ethnic Profile of counties in Wisconsin (2020 Census)
Following is a table of counties in Wisconsin by race/ethnicity. The majority racial/ethnic group is coded per the key below.

Majority minority with no dominant group
Majority White
Majority Black
Majority Hispanic
Majority Asian
Majority Native American

Racial and ethnic composition of counties in Wisconsin (2020 Census) (NH = Non-Hispanic) Note: the US Census treats Hispanic/Latino as an ethnic category. This table excludes Latinos from the racial categories and assigns them to a separate category. Hispanics/Latinos may be of any race.
County	Location of County	Total Population	White alone (NH)	%	Black or African American alone (NH)	%	Native American or Alaska Native alone (NH)	%	Asian alone (NH)	%	Pacific Islander alone (NH)	%	Other race alone (NH)	%	Mixed race or Multiracial (NH)	%	Hispanic or Latino (any race)	%
Adams		20,654	18,372	88.95%	593	2.87%	165	0.80%	84	0.41%	8	0.04%	60	0.29%	575	2.78%	797	3.86%
Ashland		16,027	12,678	79.10%	112	0.70%	1,999	12.47%	82	0.51%	9	0.06%	22	0.14%	742	4.63%	383	2.39%
Barron		46,711	42,210	90.36%	813	1.74%	436	0.93%	345	0.74%	5	0.01%	99	0.21%	1,526	3.27%	1,277	2.73%
Bayfield		16,220	13,445	82.89%	54	0.33%	1,612	9.94%	36	0.22%	2	0.01%	56	0.35%	736	4.54%	279	1.72%
Brown		268,740	208,440	77.56%	8,154	3.03%	6,329	2.36%	8,445	3.14%	114	0.04%	637	0.24%	10,405	3.87%	26,216	9.76%
Buffalo		13,317	12,577	94.44%	43	0.32%	31	0.23%	19	0.14%	12	0.09%	8	0.06%	300	2.25%	327	2.46%
Burnett		16,526	14,658	88.70%	65	0.39%	697	4.22%	53	0.32%	10	0.06%	32	0.19%	757	4.58%	254	1.54%
Calumet		52,442	46,056	87.82%	419	0.80%	189	0.36%	1,269	2.42%	42	0.08%	124	0.24%	1,486	2.83%	2,857	5.45%
Chippewa		66,297	60,391	91.09%	1,040	1.57%	323	0.49%	959	1.45%	14	0.02%	153	0.23%	2,160	3.26%	1,257	1.90%
Clark		34,659	31,566	91.08%	103	0.30%	117	0.34%	106	0.31%	4	0.01%	72	0.21%	593	1.71%	2,098	6.05%
Columbia		58,490	53,037	90.68%	866	1.48%	270	0.46%	376	0.64%	11	0.02%	122	0.21%	1,669	2.85%	2,139	3.66%
Crawford		16,113	15,018	93.20%	265	1.64%	41	0.25%	68	0.42%	1	0.01%	34	0.21%	426	2.64%	260	1.61%
Dane		561,504	426,721	76.00%	29,742	5.30%	1,275	0.23%	35,592	6.34%	214	0.04%	2,103	0.37%	23,903	4.26%	41,954	7.47%
Dodge		89,396	77,845	87.08%	2,701	3.02%	371	0.42%	511	0.57%	11	0.01%	204	0.23%	2,263	2.53%	5,490	6.14%
Door		30,066	27,524	91.55%	140	0.47%	122	0.41%	136	0.45%	0	0.00%	76	0.25%	930	3.09%	1,138	3.79%
Douglas		44,295	39,417	88.99%	576	1.30%	763	1.72%	286	0.65%	18	0.04%	139	0.31%	2,328	5.26%	768	1.73%
Dunn		45,440	40,912	90.04%	388	0.85%	157	0.35%	1,451	3.19%	13	0.03%	88	0.19%	1,396	3.07%	1,035	2.28%
Eau Claire		105,710	92,354	87.37%	1,213	1.15%	440	0.42%	4,365	4.13%	83	0.08%	251	0.24%	3,886	3.68%	3,118	2.95%
Florence		4,558	4,296	94.25%	9	0.20%	30	0.66%	5	0.11%	4	0.09%	11	0.24%	137	3.01%	66	1.45%
Fond du Lac		104,154	90,150	86.55%	2,321	2.23%	355	0.34%	1,241	1.19%	31	0.03%	214	0.21%	3,125	3.00%	6,717	6.45%
Forest		9,179	7,371	80.30%	32	0.35%	1,187	12.93%	17	0.19%	7	0.08%	3	0.03%	407	4.43%	155	1.69%
Grant		51,938	48,325	93.04%	679	1.31%	95	0.18%	411	0.79%	8	0.02%	58	0.11%	1,126	2.17%	1,236	2.38%
Green		37,093	33,960	91.55%	201	0.54%	49	0.13%	170	0.46%	3	0.01%	76	0.20%	1,134	3.06%	1,500	4.04%
Green Lake		19,018	17,255	90.73%	106	0.56%	49	0.26%	101	0.53%	0	0.00%	39	0.21%	489	2.57%	979	5.15%
Iowa		23,709	22,203	93.65%	114	0.48%	26	0.11%	178	0.75%	12	0.05%	50	0.21%	671	2.83%	455	1.92%
Iron		6,137	5,809	94.66%	11	0.18%	63	1.03%	13	0.21%	0	0.00%	27	0.44%	142	2.31%	72	1.17%
Jackson		21,145	17,939	84.84%	440	2.08%	1,319	6.24%	73	0.35%	0	0.00%	45	0.21%	651	3.08%	678	3.21%
Jefferson		84,900	73,325	86.37%	864	1.02%	206	0.24%	646	0.76%	19	0.02%	202	0.24%	2,570	3.03%	7,068	8.33%
Juneau		26,718	24,008	89.86%	548	2.05%	355	1.33%	147	0.55%	1	0.00%	52	0.19%	880	3.29%	727	2.72%
Kenosha		169,151	121,936	72.09%	11,480	6.79%	371	0.22%	2,793	1.65%	67	0.04%	528	0.31%	7,430	4.39%	24,546	14.51%
Kewaunee		20,563	18,992	92.36%	57	0.28%	55	0.27%	64	0.31%	2	0.01%	41	0.20%	518	2.52%	834	4.06%
La Crosse		120,784	105,307	87.19%	1,927	1.60%	440	0.36%	5,599	4.64%	16	0.01%	385	0.32%	4,059	3.36%	3,051	2.53%
Lafayette		16,611	15,081	90.79%	27	0.16%	20	0.12%	36	0.22%	4	0.02%	19	0.11%	335	2.02%	1,089	6.56%
Langlade		19,491	17,960	92.15%	105	0.54%	235	1.21%	67	0.34%	4	0.02%	36	0.18%	625	3.21%	459	2.35%
Lincoln		28,415	26,734	94.08%	148	0.52%	108	0.38%	117	0.41%	2	0.01%	35	0.12%	742	2.61%	529	1.86%
Manitowoc		81,359	70,951	87.21%	1,027	1.26%	371	0.46%	2,247	2.76%	15	0.02%	212	0.26%	2,486	3.06%	4,050	4.98%
Marathon		138,013	118,783	86.07%	1,141	0.83%	546	0.40%	8,431	6.11%	29	0.02%	340	0.25%	4,290	3.11%	4,453	3.23%
Marinette		41,872	38,754	92.55%	192	0.46%	203	0.48%	180	0.43%	8	0.02%	96	0.23%	1,360	3.25%	1,079	2.58%
Marquette		15,592	14,477	92.85%	44	0.28%	60	0.38%	51	0.33%	5	0.03%	45	0.29%	422	2.71%	488	3.13%
Menominee		4,255	483	11.35%	2	0.05%	3,549	83.41%	2	0.05%	2	0.05%	0	0.00%	81	1.90%	136	3.20%
Milwaukee		939,489	456,520	48.59%	240,416	25.59%	3,878	0.41%	45,989	4.90%	262	0.03%	4,227	0.45%	35,180	3.74%	153,017	16.29%
Monroe		46,274	40,608	87.76%	620	1.34%	493	1.07%	352	0.76%	63	0.14%	111	0.24%	1,467	3.17%	2,560	5.53%
Oconto		38,965	36,170	92.83%	91	0.23%	463	1.19%	110	0.28%	0	0.00%	66	0.17%	1,217	3.12%	848	2.18%
Oneida		37,845	35,264	93.18%	205	0.54%	441	1.17%	195	0.52%	18	0.05%	117	0.31%	1,030	2.72%	575	1.52%
Outagamie		190,705	161,879	84.88%	2,929	1.54%	2,743	1.44%	6,588	3.45%	112	0.06%	415	0.22%	6,616	3.47%	9,423	4.94%
Ozaukee		91,503	81,410	88.97%	1,483	1.62%	167	0.18%	2,283	2.50%	14	0.02%	343	0.37%	2,705	2.96%	3,098	3.39%
Pepin		7,318	6,866	93.82%	20	0.27%	33	0.45%	22	0.30%	0	0.00%	7	0.10%	213	2.91%	157	2.15%
Pierce		42,212	38,535	91.29%	402	0.95%	209	0.50%	289	0.68%	10	0.02%	139	0.33%	1,408	3.34%	1,220	2.89%
Polk		44,977	41,772	92.87%	159	0.35%	370	0.82%	205	0.46%	7	0.02%	130	0.29%	1,387	3.08%	947	2.11%
Portage		70,377	62,212	88.40%	903	1.28%	242	0.34%	2,252	3.20%	16	0.02%	142	0.20%	1,990	2.83%	2,620	3.72%
Price		14,054	13,157	93.62%	31	0.22%	83	0.59%	67	0.48%	124	0.88%	38	0.27%	374	2.66%	180	1.28%
Racine		197,727	135,333	68.44%	22,531	11.40%	538	0.27%	2,261	1.14%	47	0.02%	792	0.40%	8,314	4.20%	27,911	14.12%
Richland		17,304	16,014	92.55%	92	0.53%	42	0.24%	95	0.55%	0	0.00%	24	0.14%	511	2.95%	526	3.04%
Rock		163,687	129,796	79.30%	8,060	4.92%	386	0.24%	2,022	1.24%	50	0.03%	523	0.32%	7,050	4.31%	15,800	9.65%
Rusk		14,188	13,287	93.65%	44	0.31%	58	0.41%	53	0.37%	5	0.04%	36	0.25%	455	3.21%	250	1.76%
St. Croix		93,536	85,457	91.36%	635	0.68%	233	0.25%	984	1.05%	33	0.04%	309	0.33%	3,206	3.43%	2,679	2.86%
Sauk		65,763	57,868	87.99%	578	0.88%	764	1.16%	394	0.60%	15	0.02%	148	0.23%	1,946	2.96%	4,050	6.16%
Sawyer		18,074	13,817	76.45%	96	0.53%	2,861	15.83%	63	0.35%	2	0.01%	54	0.30%	823	4.55%	358	1.98%
Shawano		40,881	34,404	84.16%	117	0.29%	3,309	8.09%	165	0.40%	6	0.01%	59	0.14%	1,645	4.02%	1,176	2.88%
Sheboygan		118,034	95,837	81.19%	2,434	2.06%	362	0.31%	6,875	5.82%	21	0.02%	360	0.30%	3,483	2.95%	8,662	7.34%
Taylor		19,913	18,713	93.97%	64	0.32%	39	0.20%	62	0.31%	5	0.03%	14	0.07%	449	2.25%	567	2.85%
Trempealeau		30,760	25,830	83.97%	81	0.26%	82	0.27%	109	0.35%	0	0.00%	52	0.17%	649	2.11%	3,957	12.86%
Vernon		30,714	29,179	95.00%	121	0.39%	41	0.13%	89	0.29%	9	0.03%	96	0.31%	715	2.33%	464	1.51%
Vilas		23,047	19,569	84.91%	49	0.21%	2,181	9.46%	57	0.25%	0	0.00%	61	0.26%	671	2.91%	459	1.99%
Walworth		106,478	88,104	82.74%	1,166	1.10%	229	0.22%	1,002	0.94%	10	0.01%	268	0.25%	3,149	2.96%	12,550	11.79%
Washburn		16,623	15,348	92.33%	30	0.18%	182	1.09%	59	0.35%	4	0.02%	36	0.22%	665	4.00%	299	1.80%
Washington		136,761	123,855	90.56%	1,672	1.22%	272	0.20%	1,943	1.42%	28	0.02%	407	0.30%	3,757	2.75%	4,827	3.53%
Waukesha		406,978	347,922	85.49%	6,648	1.63%	807	0.20%	15,616	3.84%	121	0.03%	1,138	0.28%	12,891	3.17%	21,835	5.37%
Waupaca		51,812	47,784	92.23%	202	0.39%	242	0.47%	254	0.49%	4	0.01%	105	0.20%	1,357	2.62%	1,864	3.60%
Waushara		24,520	21,552	87.90%	389	1.59%	121	0.49%	98	0.40%	14	0.06%	50	0.20%	603	2.46%	1,693	6.90%
Winnebago		171,730	145,581	84.77%	4,931	2.87%	935	0.54%	5,560	3.24%	53	0.03%	362	0.21%	5,980	3.48%	8,328	4.85%
Wood		74,207	67,055	90.36%	547	0.74%	549	0.74%	1,382	1.86%	29	0.04%	190	0.26%	2,079	2.80%	2,376	3.20%

== Renamed counties ==
Five counties in Wisconsin have been renamed, but otherwise kept their same borders.

- Bad Axe County existed from 1851 to 1862. It was named after the Bad Axe River and the Battle of Bad Axe. It was renamed to Vernon County in 1862.
- Dallas County existed for 10 years, from 1859 to 1869. It was named after George M. Dallas, the 11th vice president of the United States. It was named to Barron County in 1869.
- Gates County existed from 1901 to 1905. It was named after Milwaukee land speculator James L. Gates. It was renamed to Rusk County in 1905.
- La Pointe County existed from 1845 to 1866. In 1848, when Wisconsin achieved statehood, La Pointe County was split between Wisconsin and Minnesota. It was renamed to Bayfield County in 1866.
- New County existed briefly between 1879 and 1880. It was formed from part of Oconto County. It was renamed to Langlade County in 1880.

== Proposed counties ==
Two proposed counties were ultimately not established.

- In 1850, Tuskola County was proposed as a new subdivision of Washington County. The proposed borders lie within the modern Washington and Ozaukee counties.
- In 1997, Century County was proposed, for creation after the year 2000, as a merger of Wood, Clark, and Marathon counties that would be centered around the city of Marshfield. The name was selected to represent "a new county for a new century". Problems associated with Frac Sand mining rekindled the idea in 2012.

== See also ==
- BOW counties
- WOW counties
- Political subdivisions of Wisconsin
- List of cities in Wisconsin
- List of villages in Wisconsin
- List of towns in Wisconsin
