= BOW counties =

Politically notable region in Wisconsin

Coordinates: 44°15′N 88°27′W

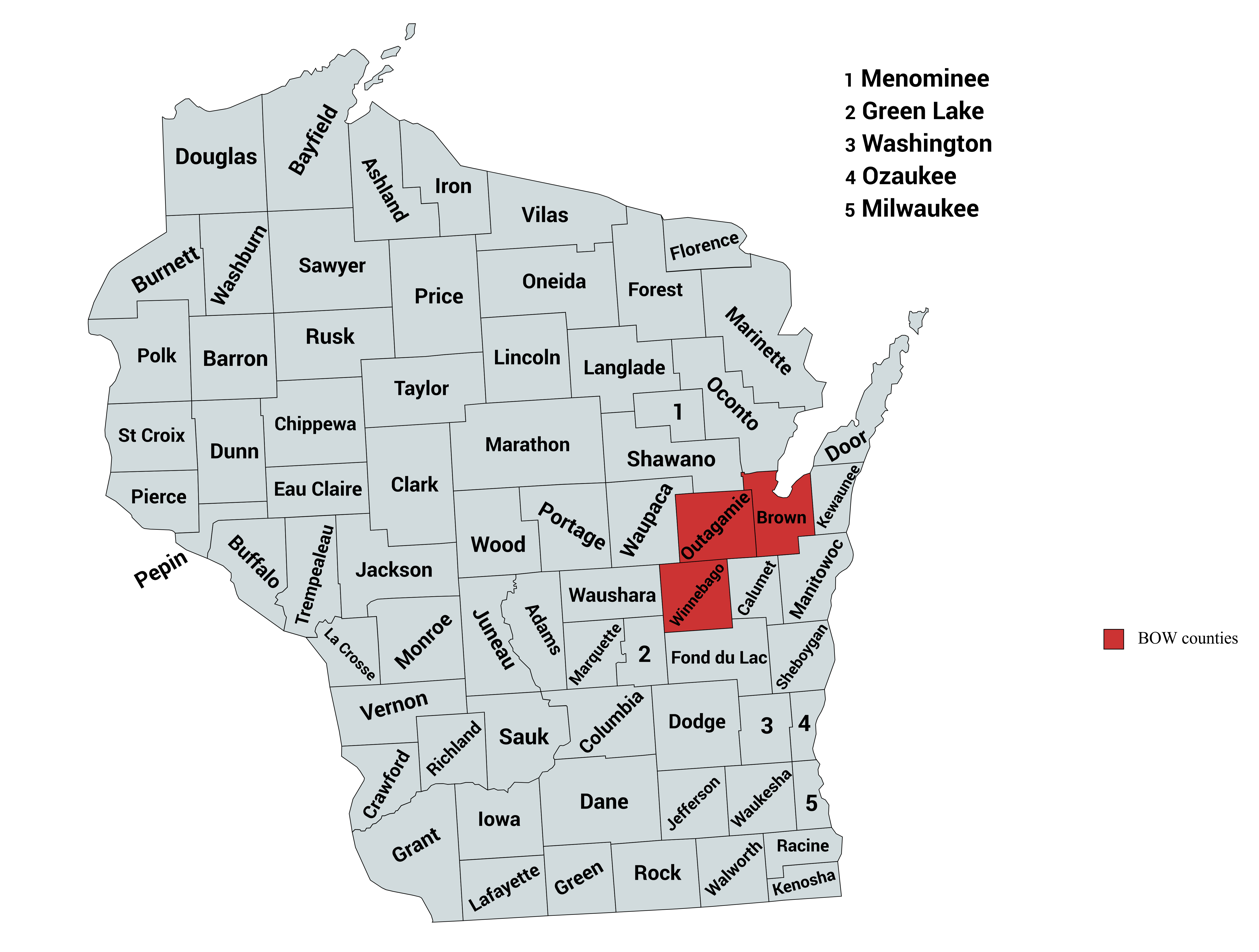
Map of Wisconsin highlighting the BOW counties in red

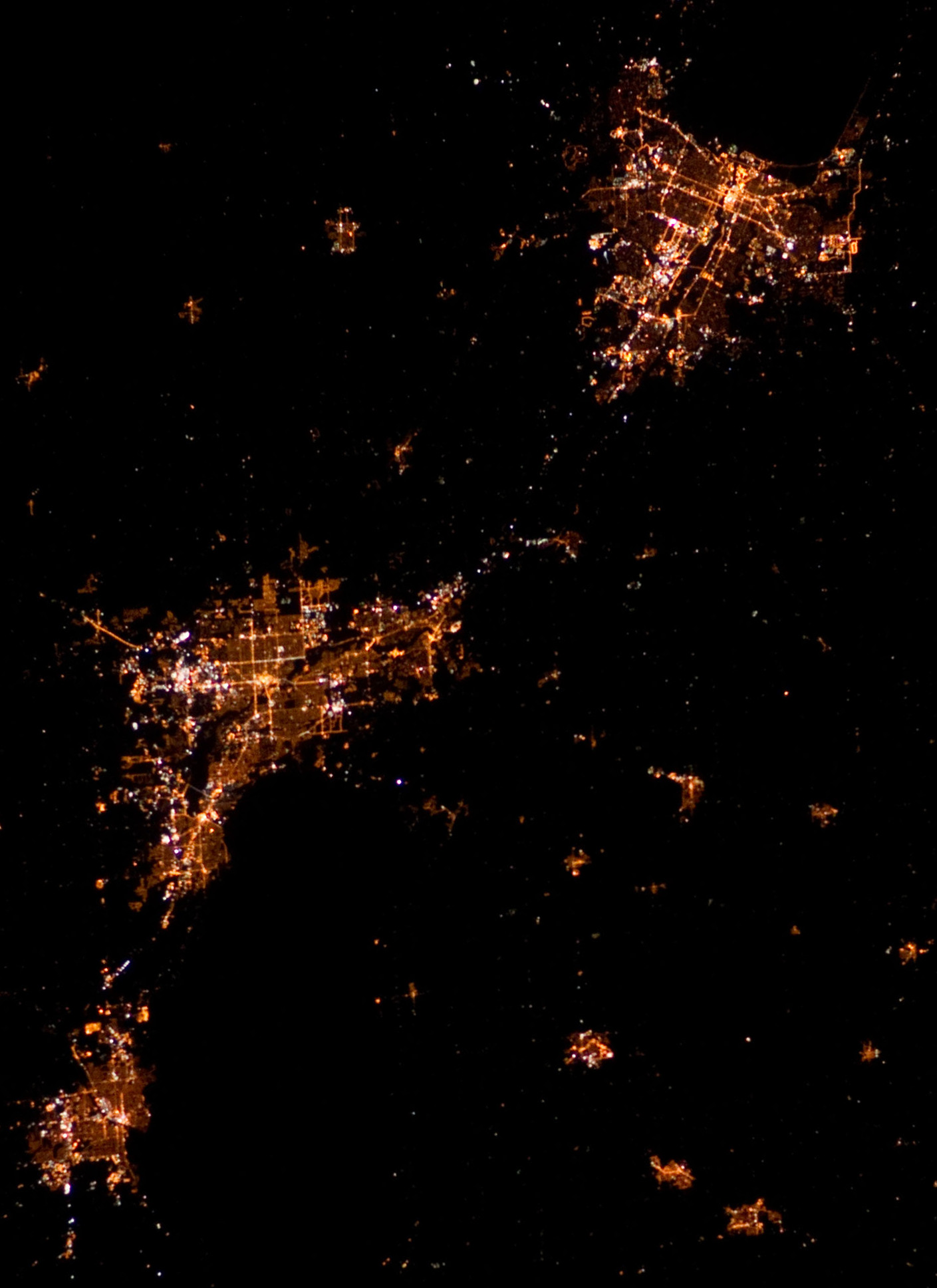
Population centers of the BOW counties: from top, Green Bay, Appleton, and Oshkosh bordering Lake Winnebago

The BOW counties (/baʊ/) are three counties in Northeast Wisconsin: Brown, Outagamie, and Winnebago, which include the cities of Green Bay, Appleton and Oshkosh and most of their suburbs. The counties stretch from the western shore of Lake Winnebago down the Fox River to Green Bay. The region overlaps with the Fox Cities but includes the more populous Brown County, and not Calumet County. The region also excludes the similarly sized Fond du Lac County as it is more solidly Republican and last voted for a Democrat for president in 1964. The term has been in use since at least 2018, but only started being used by mainstream sources in 2020.

The area is one of the most purple (evenly divided) in the state, and a key swing region. These counties tend to be left-leaning compared to the more right-leaning WOW counties located near Milwaukee. In the 2016 United States presidential election in Wisconsin, Donald Trump received the most votes for president in the BOW counties but with smaller margins than the WOW counties. Trump had 52% of the vote in Brown County, 54% in Outagamie County and just over 50% in Winnebago County. However, in 2020 it was one of 21 regions in the country identified that had an impact on Joe Biden's victory. In addition to presidential elections, the region is watched in other elections, such as races for United States Senate and Wisconsin Supreme Court. In 2023, Outagamie voted for left-leaning Justice Janet Protasiewicz despite favoring Trump in the previous year. This contributed to Democrats focusing on the region in the 2024 United States presidential election.

== Election history ==
The presidential election results for the BOW counties for recent elections is as follows:

	Total	Democratic votes	Democratic percentage	Republican votes	Republican percentage	Third party votes
2024 Total	356,636	162,035	45.43%	189,138	53.03%	5,463
2024 Brown	149,333	67,937	45.49%	79,132	52.99%	2264
2024 Outagamie	111,932	49,438	44.17%	60,827	54.34%	1667
2024 Winnebago	95,371	44,660	46.83%	49,179	51.57%	1532
2020 Total	346,071	157,238	45.44%	182,052	52.61%	6,781
2020 Brown	144,017	65,511	45.49%	75,871	52.68%	2,635
2020 Outagamie	108,022	47,667	44.13%	58,385	54.05%	1,970
2020 Winnebago	94,032	44,060	46.86%	47,796	50.83%	2,176
2016 Total	310,079	128,497	41.44%	160,534	51.77%	19,697
2016 Brown	129,011	53,382	41.38%	67,210	52.10%	7,944
2016 Outagamie	93,933	38,068	40.53%	49,879	53.10%	5,506
2016 Winnebago	87,135	37,047	42.52%	43,445	49.86%	6,247
2012 Total	312,697	153,634	49.13%	154,330	49.35%	4,733
2012 Brown	128,928	62,526	48.50%	64,836	50.29%	1,566
2012 Outagamie	94,596	45,659	48.27%	47,372	50.08%	1,565
2012 Winnebago	89,173	45,449	50.97%	42,122	47.24%	1,602
2008 Total	303,994	165,730	54.52%	133,477	43.91%	4,609
2008 Brown	124,754	67,269	53.92%	55,854	44.77%	1,631
2008 Outagamie	91,563	50,294	54.93%	39,677	43.33%	1,414
2008 Winnebago	87,677	48,167	54.94%	37,946	43.28%	1,564
2004 Total	301,940	136,047	45.06%	162,618	53.86%	3,275
2004 Brown	123,294	54,935	44.56%	67,173	54.48%	1,186
2004 Outagamie	90,050	40,169	44.61%	48,903	54.31%	978
2004 Winnebago	88,596	40,943	46.21%	46,542	52.53%	1,111
2000 Total	259,591	115,814	44.61%	132,048	50.87%	11,729
2000 Brown	107,769	49,096	45.56%	54,258	50.35%	4,415
2000 Outagamie	75,742	32,735	43.22%	39,460	52.10%	3,547
2000 Winnebago	76,080	33,983	44.67%	38,330	50.38%	3,767
1996 Total						
1996 Brown			47.1%		42.5%	
1996 Outagamie			44.4%		42.8%	
1996 Winnebago			45.3%		42.7%	

== See also ==
WOW counties
