= 2016 United States presidential election in Wisconsin =

- November 8, 2016
- Turnout: 67.34% (▼3.01 pp)

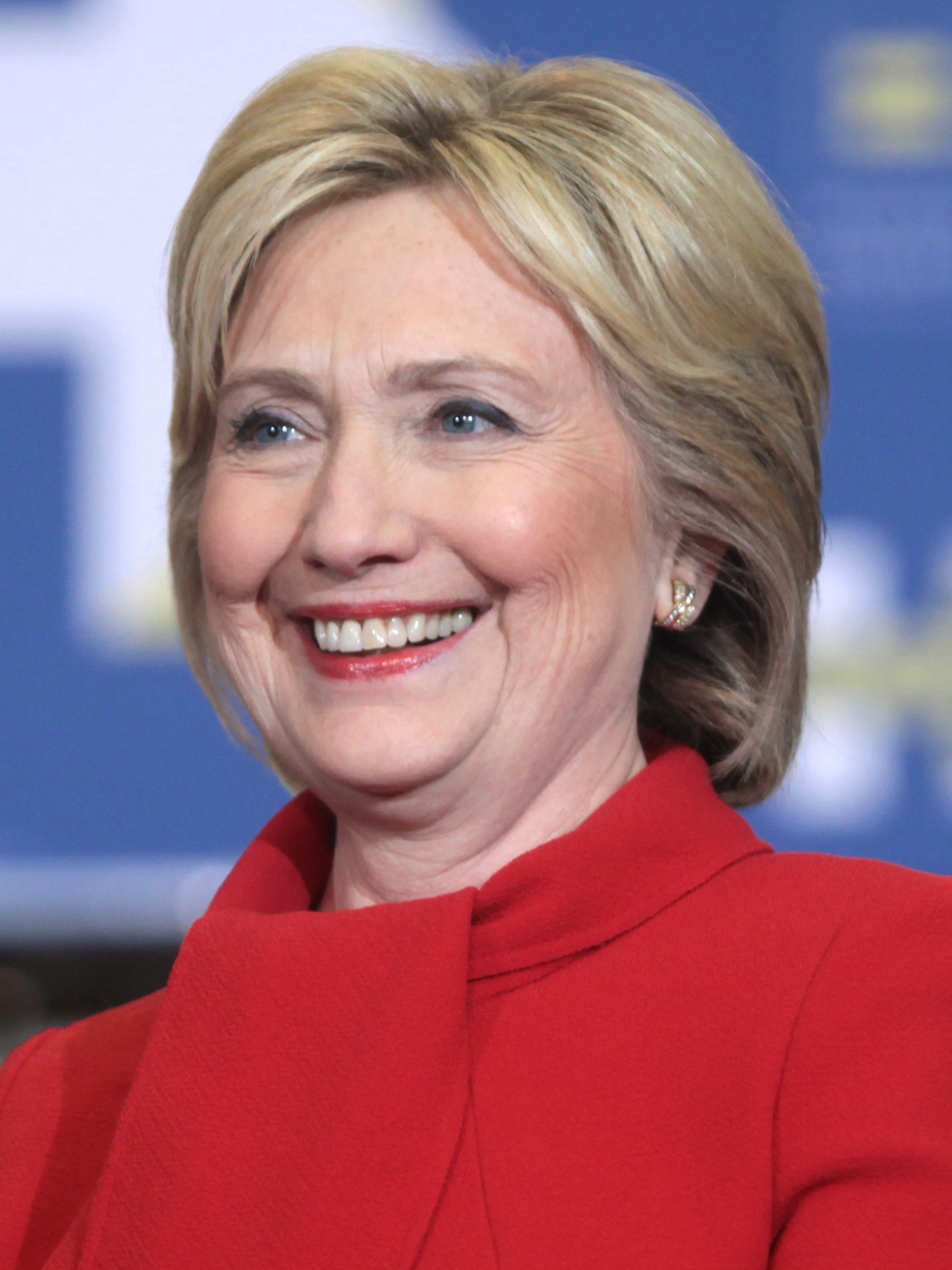
Nominee	Donald Trump	Hillary Clinton
Party	Republican	Democratic
Home state	New York	New York
Running mate	Mike Pence	Tim Kaine
Electoral vote	10	0
Popular vote	1,405,284	1,382,536
Percentage	47.22%	46.45%

Trump
30–40%
40–50%
50–60%
60–70%
70–80%
80–90%
90–100%
Clinton
30–40%
40–50%
50–60%
60–70%
70–80%
80–90%
90–100%
Tie
No data
President before election
Barack Obama
Democratic
Elected President
Donald Trump
Republican

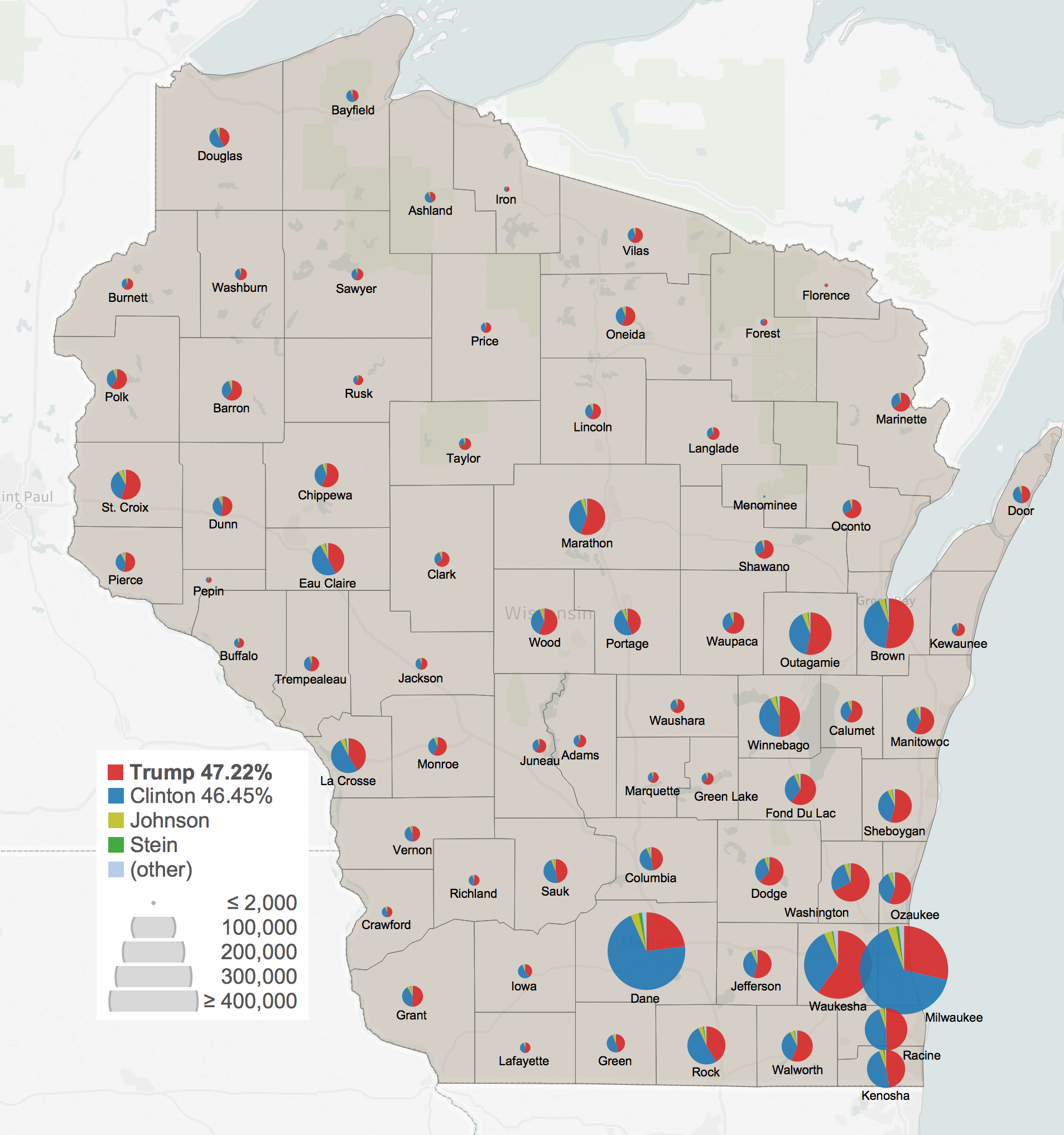
Results by county with size showing number of votes

Treemap of the popular vote by county

The 2016 United States presidential election in Wisconsin was held on November 8, 2016, as part of the 2016 United States presidential election. Wisconsin voters chose ten electors to represent them in the Electoral College via a popular vote pitting Republican nominee Donald Trump against Democratic nominee Hillary Clinton.

On April 5, 2016, in the presidential primaries, Wisconsin voters expressed their preferences for the Democratic and Republican parties' respective nominees for president in an open primary; voters were allowed to vote in either party's primary regardless of their own party affiliation. Bernie Sanders prevailed in Wisconsin's Democratic primary, while Ted Cruz won Wisconsin's Republican primary.

In the general election, Donald Trump unexpectedly won Wisconsin, defeating Clinton by a margin of 0.77%, with 47.22% of the total votes to 46.45%, the lowest percentage of victory since 2004. Trump's victory in Wisconsin was attributed to overwhelming and underestimated support from white working-class citizens in the state's rural areas, a demographic that had previously tended to either vote for the Democratic candidate or did not vote at all. As of 2024, this is the last time that Door County voted for the Republican candidate in a presidential election, and the only time since 1960 that the Democratic presidential nominee won the nationwide popular vote without winning Wisconsin.

== Primaries ==
Wisconsin held its presidential primaries on April 5, 2016.

=== Democratic primary ===
==== Democratic presidential debate in Milwaukee, February 2016 ====
The Democrats held their sixth presidential debate on February 11, 2016, in Milwaukee, Wisconsin, at the University of Wisconsin–Milwaukee. The debate was hosted by PBS NewsHour anchors Gwen Ifill and Judy Woodruff; it aired on PBS and was simulcast by CNN. Participants were Hillary Clinton and Bernie Sanders.

==== Democratic primary, April 2016 ====
Election results by county. Bernie Sanders Hillary Clinton

Wisconsin Democratic primary, April 5, 2016
Candidate	Popular vote		Estimated delegates		
Candidate	Count	Percentage	Pledged	Unpledged	Total
Bernie Sanders	570,192	56.59%	48	1	49
Hillary Clinton	433,739	43.05%	38	9	47
Martin O'Malley (withdrawn)	1,732	0.17%			
Roque "Rocky" De La Fuente (write-in)	18	0.00%			
Scattering	431	0.04%			
Uncommitted	1,488	0.15%	0	0	0
Total	1,007,600	100%	86	10	96

=== Republican primary ===
==== Presidential debate in Milwaukee, November 2015 ====
The Republicans held their fourth presidential debate on November 10, 2015, in Milwaukee, at the Milwaukee Theatre. Moderated by Neil Cavuto, Maria Bartiromo and Gerard Baker, the debate aired on the Fox Business Network and was sponsored by The Wall Street Journal. Eight candidates including Donald Trump, Ben Carson, Marco Rubio, Ted Cruz, Jeb Bush, Carly Fiorina, John Kasich, and Rand Paul, participated in the primetime debate that was mostly focused on jobs, taxes, and the general health of the U.S. economy, as well as on domestic and international policy issues. The accompanying undercard debate featured Chris Christie, Mike Huckabee, Rick Santorum, and Bobby Jindal, who ended his campaign a week after the debate.

==== Republican primary, April 2016 ====
Election results by county. Ted Cruz Donald Trump

Wisconsin Republican primary, April 5, 2016
Candidate	Votes	Percentage	Actual delegate count		
Candidate	Votes	Percentage	Bound	Unbound	Total
Ted Cruz	533,079	48.20%	36	0	36
Donald Trump	387,295	35.02%	6	0	6
John Kasich	155,902	14.10%	0	0	0
Marco Rubio (withdrawn)	10,591	0.96%	0	0	0
Ben Carson (withdrawn)	5,660	0.51%	0	0	0
Jeb Bush (withdrawn)	3,054	0.28%	0	0	0
Rand Paul (withdrawn)	2,519	0.23%	0	0	0
Uncommitted	2,281	0.21%	0	0	0
Mike Huckabee (withdrawn)	1,424	0.13%	0	0	0
Chris Christie (withdrawn)	1,191	0.11%	0	0	0
Carly Fiorina (withdrawn)	772	0.07%	0	0	0
Rick Santorum (withdrawn)	511	0.05%	0	0	0
Jim Gilmore (withdrawn)	245	0.02%	0	0	0
Victor Williams (write-in)	39	<0.01%	0	0	0
Unprojected delegates:			0	0	0
Total:	1,105,944	100.00%	42	0	42
Source: The Green Papers

=== Green Party presidential preference convention ===
The Wisconsin Green Party held its presidential preference vote at its annual state convention in Madison, Wisconsin, on April 16.

Wisconsin Green Party presidential convention, April 13, 2016
Candidate	Votes	Percentage	National delegates
Jill Stein	–	–	7
William Kreml	–	–	1
Sedinam Moyowasifza-Curry	–	–	–
Darryl Cherney	–	–	–
Kent Mesplay	–	–	–
Total	-	100.00%	8

== General election ==
=== Voting history ===
Wisconsin joined the Union in May 1848 and has participated in all elections from 1848 onwards. Since 1900, Wisconsin has been won by the Democrats and Republicans the same number of times. Republican-turned-Progressive Robert M. La Follette Sr. carried the state in the 1924 presidential election.

The state voted for the Democratic nominee in the seven elections from 1988 to 2012, although sometimes by small margins, as it was in 1992, 2000, and 2004. There were other occasions, in contrast, when the margin of victory was substantial, such as 1996, 2008, and 2012.

=== Predictions ===
Source	Ranking	As of
Los Angeles Times	Likely D	November 6, 2016
CNN	Lean D	November 4, 2016
Cook Political Report	Lean D	November 7, 2016
Electoral-vote.com	Likely D	November 8, 2016
Rothenberg Political Report	Tilt D	November 7, 2016
Sabato's Crystal Ball	Likely D	November 7, 2016
RealClearPolitics	Lean D	November 8, 2016
Fox News	Lean D	November 7, 2016

=== Polling ===
Polls consistently showed Democratic nominee Hillary Clinton leading by a margin of two to eight points in a four-way race. The last poll published prior to the election was by SurveyMonkey and had Hillary Clinton with a two-point lead over Donald Trump. Clinton never visited the state during the general election campaign, while Trump visited six times. On election day, Trump ended up carrying the state by less than a point, a difference of an average of five to six points from most pre-election polling. Prior to the election, many major news networks and professional and election analysts predicted the state as either lean or likely Democratic. Wisconsin's unexpected swing to Trump, along with two other Rust Belt states (Pennsylvania, Michigan), was the deciding factor in his win of 306–232 over Clinton, despite her garnering a plurality of the votes. Clinton referenced the loss in her memoir What Happened: "If there's one place where we were caught by surprise, it was Wisconsin. Polls showed us comfortably ahead, right up until the end. They also looked good for the Democrat running for Senate, Russ Feingold."

=== Results ===
2016 United States presidential election in Wisconsin
Party	Candidate	Running mate	Votes	Percentage	Electoral votes
Republican	Donald Trump	Mike Pence	1,405,284	47.22%	10
Democratic	Hillary Clinton	Tim Kaine	1,382,536	46.45%	0
Libertarian	Gary Johnson	Bill Weld	106,674	3.58%	0
Green	Jill Stein	Ajamu Baraka	31,072	1.04%	0
Constitution	Darrell L. Castle	Scott N. Bradley	12,162	0.41%	0
Independent (write-in)	Evan McMullin	Nathan Johnson	11,855	0.40%	0
Workers World	Monica Moorehead	Lamont Lilly	1,770	0.06%	0
Independent	Rocky De La Fuente	Michael Steinberg	1,502	0.05%	0
Others / Write-In Votes			23,295	0.78%	0
Totals			2,976,150	100.00%	10
Source: Wisconsin Elections Commission

==== By county ====
County	Donald Trump Republican		Hillary Clinton Democratic		Various candidates Other parties		Margin		Total
County	#	%	#	%	#	%	#	%	Total
Adams	5,966	58.89%	3,745	36.97%	419	4.14%	2,221	21.92%	10,130
Ashland	3,303	41.12%	4,226	52.61%	503	6.27%	-923	-11.49%	8,032
Barron	13,614	60.05%	7,889	34.80%	1,168	5.15%	5,725	25.25%	22,671
Bayfield	4,124	42.90%	4,953	51.53%	535	5.57%	-829	-8.63%	9,612
Brown	67,210	52.10%	53,382	41.38%	8,419	6.52%	13,828	10.72%	129,011
Buffalo	4,048	57.99%	2,525	36.17%	408	5.84%	1,523	21.82%	6,981
Burnett	5,410	61.91%	2,949	33.75%	379	4.34%	2,461	28.16%	8,738
Calumet	15,367	57.78%	9,642	36.25%	1,586	5.97%	5,725	21.53%	26,595
Chippewa	17,916	56.75%	11,887	37.66%	1,765	5.59%	6,029	19.09%	31,568
Clark	8,652	63.28%	4,221	30.87%	800	5.85%	4,431	32.41%	13,673
Columbia	14,163	47.69%	13,528	45.55%	2,007	6.76%	635	2.14%	29,698
Crawford	3,836	49.64%	3,419	44.24%	473	6.12%	417	5.40%	7,728
Dane	71,275	23.04%	217,697	70.37%	20,382	6.59%	-146,422	-47.33%	309,354
Dodge	26,635	61.83%	13,968	32.42%	2,475	5.75%	12,667	29.41%	43,078
Door	8,580	48.77%	8,014	45.55%	998	5.68%	566	3.22%	17,592
Douglas	9,661	42.87%	11,357	50.39%	1,518	6.74%	-1,696	-7.52%	22,536
Dunn	11,486	51.96%	9,034	40.87%	1,586	7.17%	2,452	11.09%	22,106
Eau Claire	23,331	42.40%	27,340	49.69%	4,354	7.91%	-4,009	-7.29%	55,025
Florence	1,898	71.46%	665	25.04%	93	3.50%	1,233	46.42%	2,656
Fond du Lac	31,022	59.89%	17,387	33.57%	3,387	6.54%	13,635	26.32%	51,796
Forest	2,787	61.32%	1,579	34.74%	179	3.94%	1,208	26.58%	4,545
Grant	12,350	50.68%	10,051	41.25%	1,967	8.07%	2,289	9.43%	24,368
Green	8,693	45.79%	9,122	48.05%	1,170	6.16%	-429	-2.26%	18,985
Green Lake	6,216	66.02%	2,693	28.60%	507	5.38%	3,523	37.42%	9,416
Iowa	4,809	39.18%	6,669	54.33%	797	6.49%	-1,860	-15.15%	12,275
Iron	2,081	59.24%	1,275	36.29%	157	4.47%	806	22.95%	3,513
Jackson	4,906	52.94%	3,818	41.20%	543	5.86%	1,088	11.74%	9,267
Jefferson	23,417	54.32%	16,569	38.44%	3,123	7.24%	6,848	15.88%	43,109
Juneau	7,130	60.76%	4,073	34.71%	532	4.53%	3,057	26.05%	11,735
Kenosha	36,037	47.23%	35,799	46.92%	4,468	5.85%	238	0.31%	76,304
Kewaunee	6,618	61.47%	3,627	33.69%	522	4.84%	2,991	27.78%	10,767
La Crosse	26,378	41.43%	32,406	50.89%	4,890	7.68%	-6,028	-9.46%	63,674
Lafayette	3,977	51.91%	3,288	42.91%	397	5.18%	689	9.00%	7,662
Langlade	6,478	63.60%	3,250	31.91%	458	4.49%	3,228	31.69%	10,186
Lincoln	8,401	57.10%	5,371	36.51%	940	6.39%	3,030	20.59%	14,712
Manitowoc	23,244	56.99%	14,538	35.64%	3,004	7.37%	8,706	21.35%	40,786
Marathon	39,014	56.12%	26,481	38.09%	4,023	5.79%	12,533	18.03%	69,518
Marinette	13,122	64.50%	6,409	31.50%	812	4.00%	6,713	33.00%	20,343
Marquette	4,709	59.68%	2,808	35.58%	374	4.74%	1,901	24.10%	7,891
Menominee	267	20.41%	1,002	76.61%	39	2.98%	-735	-56.20%	1,308
Milwaukee	126,069	28.58%	288,822	65.48%	26,162	5.94%	-162,753	-36.90%	441,053
Monroe	11,356	57.65%	7,052	35.80%	1,291	6.55%	4,354	21.85%	19,699
Oconto	13,345	66.04%	5,940	29.40%	921	4.56%	7,405	36.64%	20,206
Oneida	12,132	56.35%	8,109	37.66%	1,290	5.99%	4,023	18.69%	21,531
Outagamie	49,879	53.10%	38,068	40.53%	5,986	6.37%	11,811	12.57%	93,933
Ozaukee	30,464	55.84%	20,170	36.97%	3,926	7.19%	10,204	18.87%	54,560
Pepin	2,206	59.06%	1,344	35.98%	185	4.96%	862	23.08%	3,735
Pierce	11,272	52.73%	8,399	39.29%	1,705	7.98%	2,873	13.44%	21,376
Polk	13,810	60.72%	7,565	33.26%	1,370	6.02%	6,245	27.46%	22,745
Portage	17,305	44.84%	18,529	48.02%	2,755	7.14%	-1,224	-3.18%	38,589
Price	4,559	60.24%	2,667	35.24%	342	4.52%	1,892	25.00%	7,568
Racine	46,681	49.50%	42,641	45.22%	4,980	5.28%	4,040	4.28%	94,302
Richland	4,013	49.73%	3,569	44.23%	487	6.04%	444	5.50%	8,069
Rock	31,493	41.40%	39,339	51.71%	5,242	6.89%	-7,846	-10.31%	76,074
Rusk	4,564	64.39%	2,171	30.63%	353	4.98%	2,393	33.76%	7,088
Sauk	14,799	47.20%	14,690	46.85%	1,868	5.95%	109	0.35%	31,357
Sawyer	5,185	56.75%	3,503	38.34%	449	4.91%	1,682	18.41%	9,137
Shawano	12,769	64.46%	6,068	30.63%	973	4.91%	6,701	33.83%	19,810
Sheboygan	32,514	54.40%	23,000	38.48%	4,252	7.12%	9,514	15.92%	59,766
St. Croix	26,222	55.19%	17,482	36.80%	3,804	8.01%	8,740	18.39%	47,508
Taylor	6,579	69.46%	2,393	25.27%	499	5.27%	4,186	44.19%	9,471
Trempealeau	7,366	53.82%	5,636	41.18%	685	5.00%	1,730	12.64%	13,687
Vernon	7,004	49.06%	6,371	44.63%	900	6.31%	633	4.43%	14,275
Vilas	8,166	60.00%	4,770	35.05%	675	4.95%	3,396	24.95%	13,611
Walworth	28,863	56.16%	18,710	36.41%	3,818	7.43%	10,153	19.75%	51,391
Washburn	5,436	59.13%	3,282	35.70%	475	5.17%	2,154	23.43%	9,193
Washington	51,740	67.41%	20,852	27.17%	4,165	5.42%	30,888	40.24%	76,757
Waukesha	142,543	59.99%	79,224	33.34%	15,826	6.67%	63,319	26.65%	237,593
Waupaca	16,209	62.12%	8,451	32.39%	1,435	5.49%	7,758	29.73%	26,095
Waushara	7,667	63.50%	3,791	31.40%	616	5.10%	3,876	32.10%	12,074
Winnebago	43,445	49.86%	37,047	42.52%	6,643	7.62%	6,398	7.34%	87,135
Wood	21,498	56.85%	14,225	37.61%	2,095	5.54%	7,273	19.24%	37,818
Totals	1,405,284	47.22%	1,382,536	46.45%	188,330	6.33%	22,748	0.77%	2,976,150

Counties that flipped from Democratic to Republican

- Adams (largest city: Adams)
- Buffalo (largest city: Mondovi)
- Columbia (largest city: Portage)
- Crawford (largest city: Prairie du Chien)
- Door (largest city: Sturgeon Bay)
- Dunn (largest city: Menomonie)
- Forest (largest city: Crandon)
- Grant (largest city: Platteville)
- Jackson (largest city: Black River Falls)
- Juneau (largest city: Mauston)
- Kenosha (largest city: Kenosha)
- Lafayette (largest city: Darlington)
- Lincoln (largest city: Merrill)
- Marquette (largest city: Montello)
- Pepin (largest city: Durand)
- Price (largest city: Park Falls)
- Racine (largest city: Racine)
- Richland (largest city: Richland Center)
- Sauk (largest city: Baraboo)
- Sawyer (largest city: Hayward)
- Trempealeau (largest city: Arcadia)
- Vernon (largest city: Viroqua)
- Winnebago (largest city: Oshkosh)

==== By congressional district ====
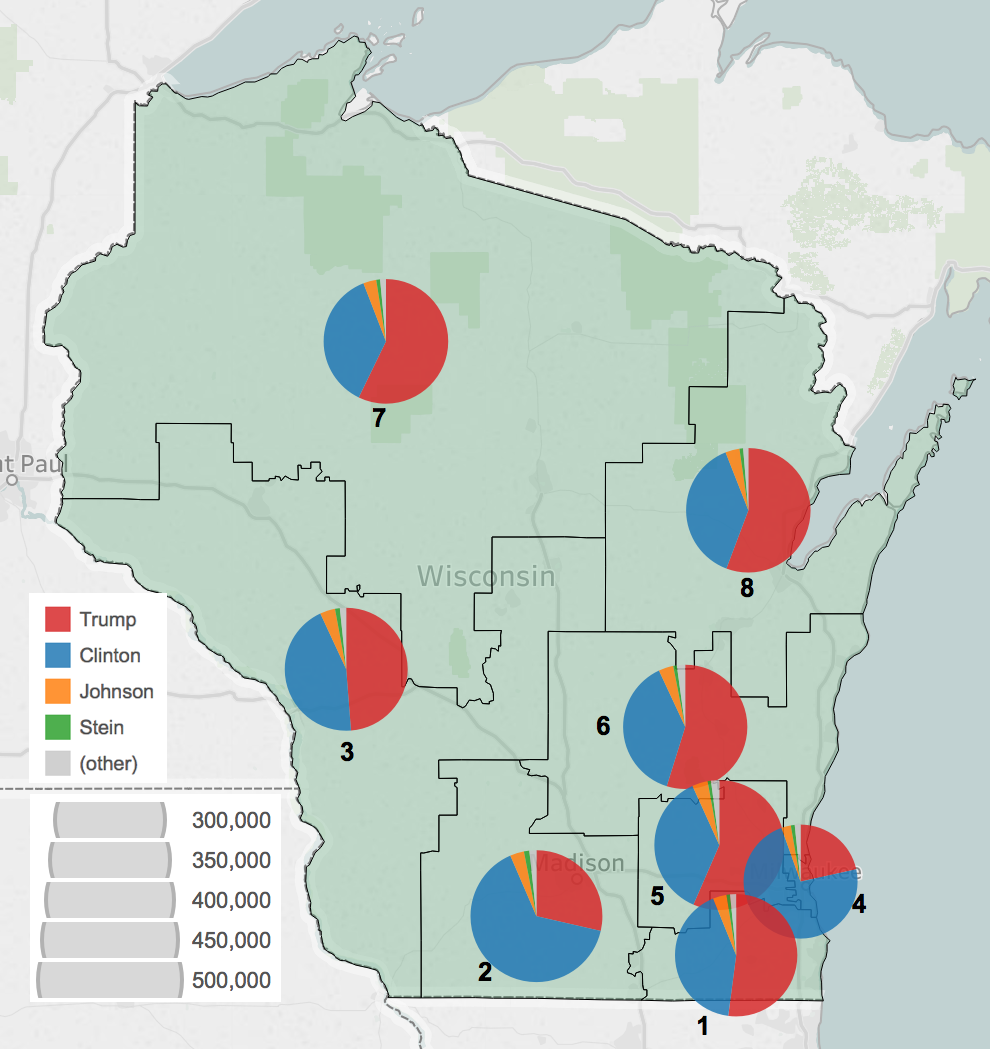
District results showing number of votes by size and candidate by color.

Trump won six of eight congressional districts, including one held by a Democrat.

District	Trump	Clinton	Representative
1st	52%	42%	Paul Ryan
2nd	29%	65%	Mark Pocan
3rd	49%	44%	Ron Kind
4th	22%	73%	Gwen Moore
5th	57%	37%	Jim Sensenbrenner
6th	55%	38%	Glenn Grothman
7th	57%	37%	Sean Duffy
8th	56%	38%	Mike Gallagher

== Analysis ==
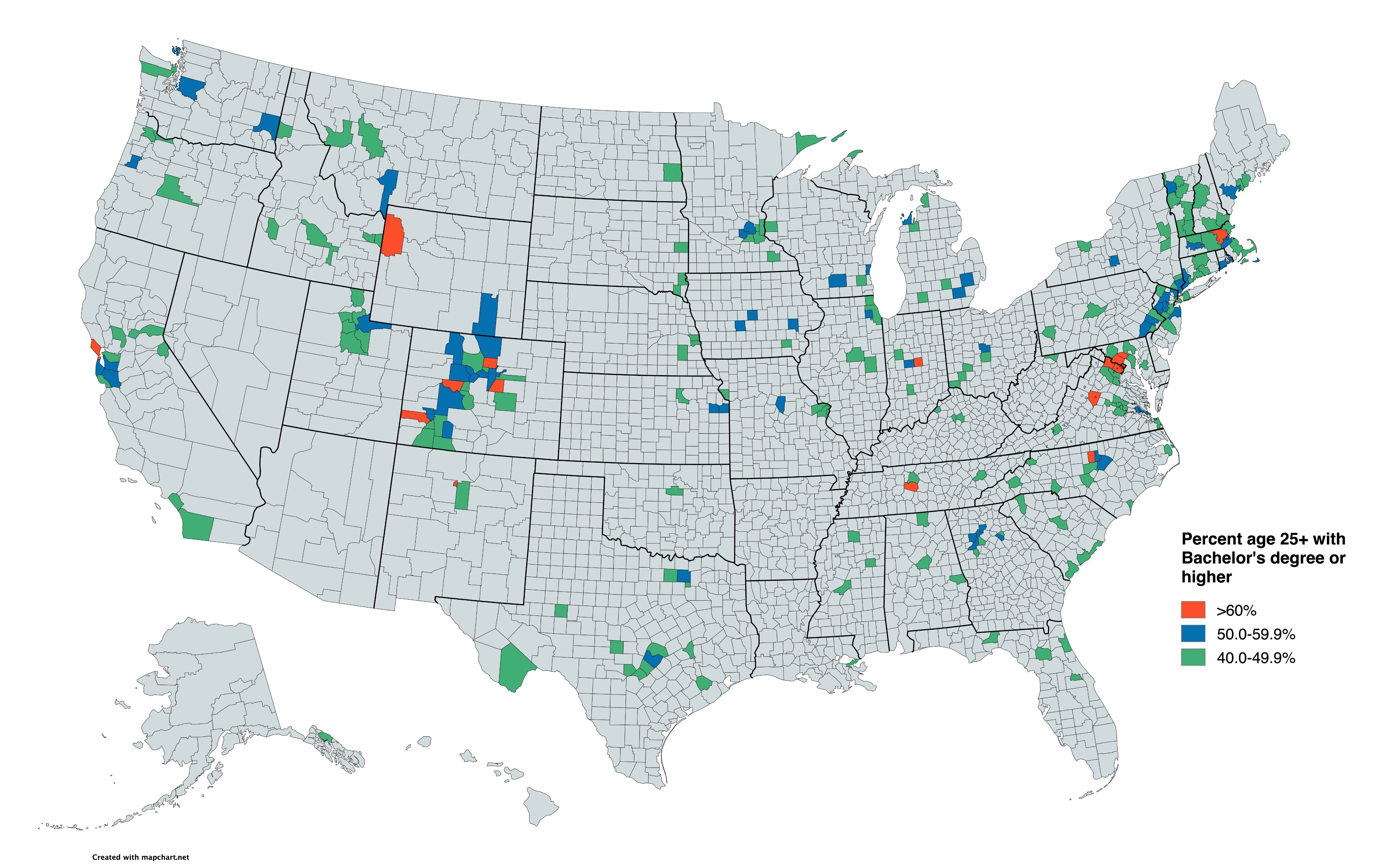
A map of the most college-educated counties in the United States

Trump became the first Republican candidate to win the state since Ronald Reagan in 1984 and the first to do so in a close election since Richard Nixon in 1960. He also became the first Republican to win a majority in Iron County since 1920. (Note: Republicans Richard Nixon in 1972, George W. Bush in 2000, and Mitt Romney in 2012 also all won Iron County, however, they only received pluralities.)

The only counties in the state to swing leftward were the three most college-educated counties in the state (see the map), namely Dane (home to the University of Wisconsin-Madison), and the WOW counties of Waukesha and Ozaukee. The other WOW county of Washington County and Milwaukee County only narrowly shifted rightward. These swings were insufficient to prevent Trump from flipping the state, but they were enough to keep the state's margin of victory under 1%.

Wisconsin weighed in for this election as 2.9% more Republican than the nation at large, the first time it voted to the right of the nation since 2000. Trump was the first Republican to win Adams, Buffalo, Crawford, Dunn, Jackson, Trempealeau, and Vernon counties since 1984, Grant, Sauk, and Lafayette counties since 1988, and Kenosha and Pepin counties since 1972. Wisconsin was also one of eleven states to have voted twice for Bill Clinton but not for Hillary Clinton.

=== Recount ===
On November 25, 2016, with 90 minutes remaining on the deadline to petition for a recount to the state's electoral body, 2016 Green presidential candidate Jill Stein filed for a recount of the election results in Wisconsin. She signaled she intended to file for similar recounts in the subsequent days in the states of Michigan and Pennsylvania. On November 26, the Clinton campaign announced that they were joining the recount effort in Wisconsin. Trump filed a lawsuit to halt the process, but it was rejected by a federal judge. The final result of the recount confirmed Trump's victory in Wisconsin, where he gained a net 131 votes. Trump gained 837 additional votes, while Clinton gained 706 additional votes.

== See also ==
- United States presidential elections in Wisconsin
- 2016 Democratic Party presidential debates and forums
- 2016 Democratic Party presidential primaries
- 2016 Republican Party presidential debates and forums
- 2016 Republican Party presidential primaries
- 2016 United States presidential election recounts
