= 2012 United States presidential election in Wisconsin =

- November 6, 2012
- Turnout: 70.35% (▲1.2 pp)

| Nominee | Barack Obama | Mitt Romney |
| Party | Democratic | Republican |
| Home state | Illinois | Massachusetts |
| Running mate | Joe Biden | Paul Ryan |
| Electoral vote | 10 | 0 |
| Popular vote | 1,620,985 | 1,407,966 |
| Percentage | 52.83% | 45.89% |

Obama
30–40%
40–50%
50–60%
60–70%
70–80%
80–90%
90–100%
Romney
30–40%
40–50%
50–60%
60–70%
70–80%
80–90%
90–100%
Tie/No Data
President before election
Barack Obama
Democratic
Elected President
Barack Obama
Democratic

The 2012 United States presidential election in Wisconsin took place on November 6, 2012, as part of the 2012 United States presidential election in which all 50 states plus the District of Columbia participated. Wisconsin voters chose 10 electors to represent them in the Electoral College via a popular vote pitting incumbent Democratic President Barack Obama and his running mate, Vice President Joe Biden, against Republican challenger and former Massachusetts Governor Mitt Romney and his running mate, Congressman Paul Ryan.

Obama won the state of Wisconsin with 52.83% of the vote to Romney's 45.89%, a 6.94% margin of victory. While this represented half the victory margin of Obama's 13.91% win in 2008, when he won 59 of 72 counties and 7 of 8 congressional districts, it still remains the only other presidential election in the 21st century where the winning candidate won the state by more than 1% of the vote. Obama's win was also surprisingly comfortable even though Wisconsin was the home state of Republican vice presidential nominee Paul Ryan, making him the first Republican vice presidential nominee to lose their home state since Jack Kemp lost New York in 1996.

== Primary elections ==
=== Democratic primary ===
President Barack Obama ran unopposed in the Democratic Primary, winning 293,914 votes, or 97.89%. Uncommitted ballots received 5,092 votes, or 1.89% of the vote, while 849 votes, 0.28%, were scattered. 111 delegates, all of which were pledged to Obama were sent to the 2012 Democratic National Convention in Charlotte, North Carolina.

=== Republican primary ===
2012 Wisconsin Republican presidential primary
- April 3, 2012

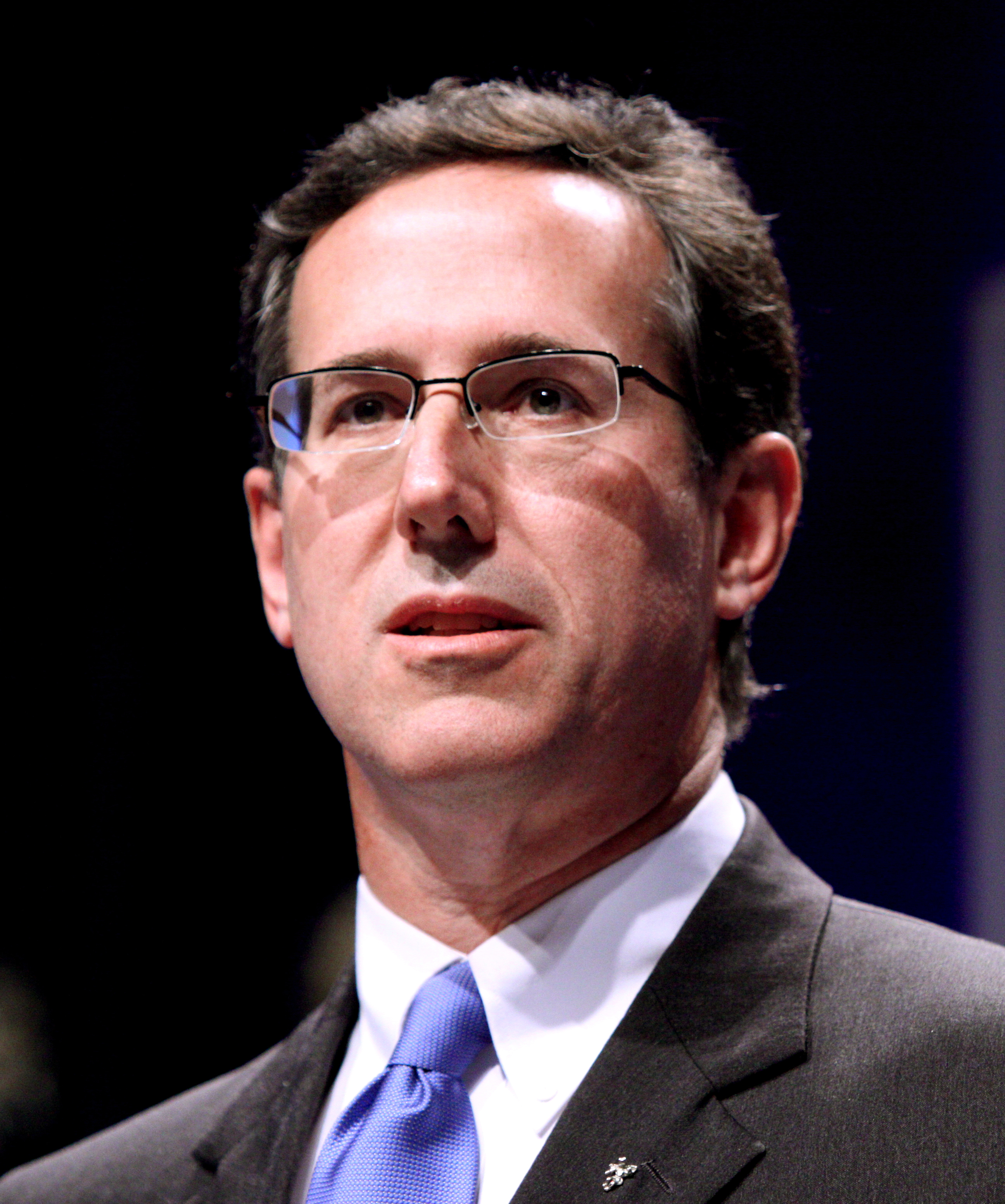

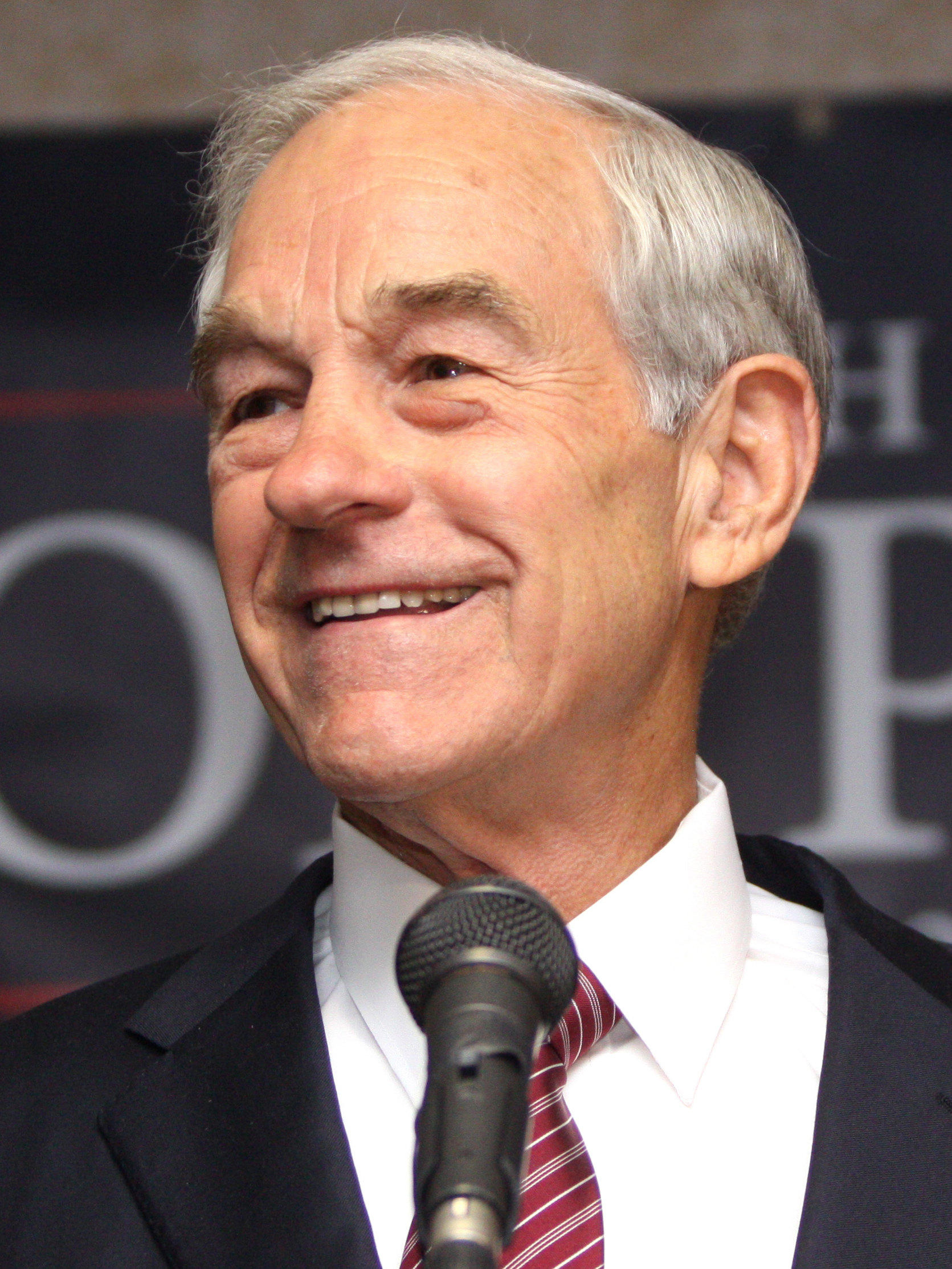

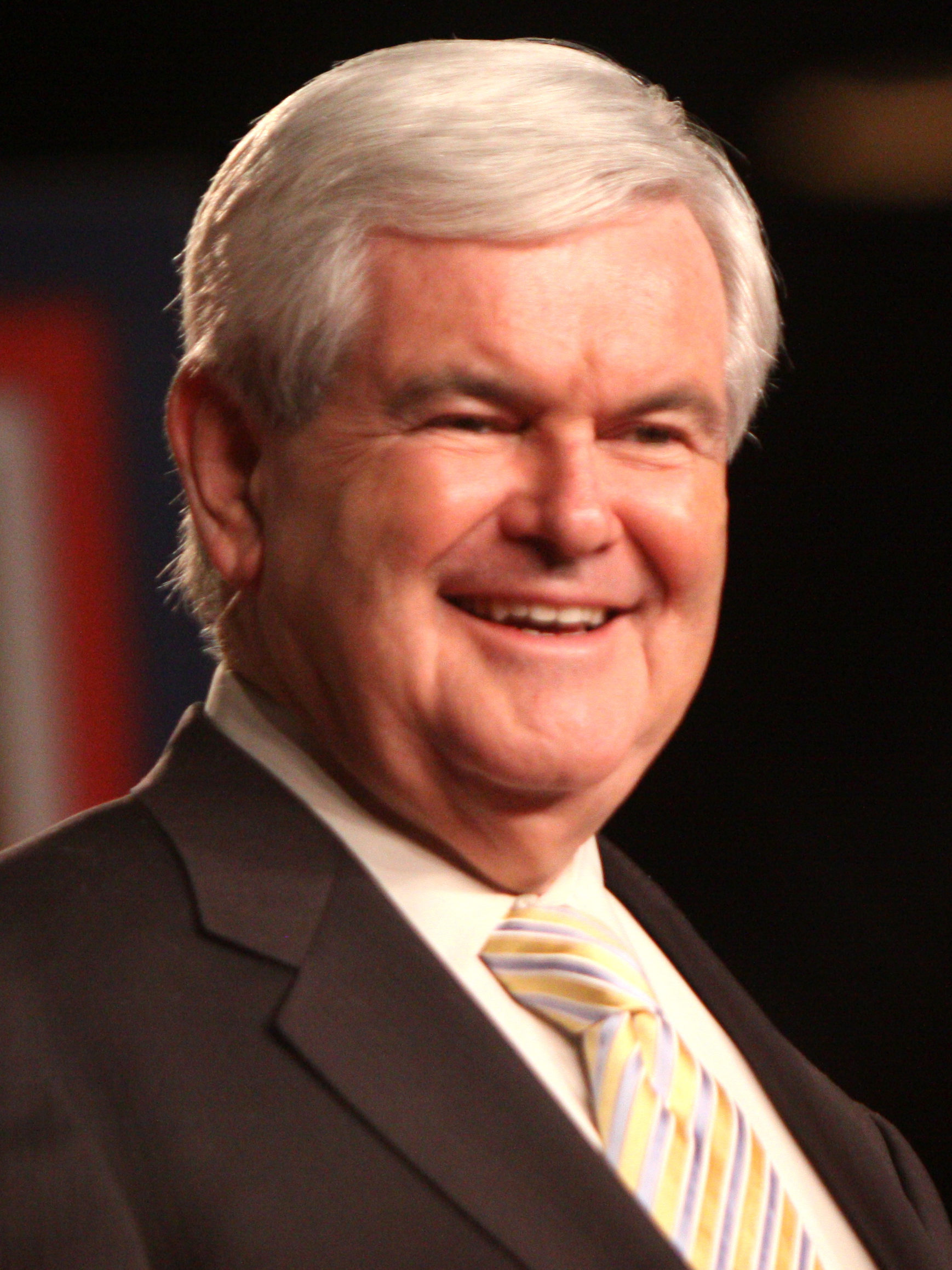
| Candidate | Mitt Romney | Rick Santorum |
| Home state | Massachusetts | Pennsylvania |
| Delegate count | 33 | 9 |
| Popular vote | 346,876 | 290,139 |
| Percentage | 44.03% | 36.83% |
| Candidate | Ron Paul | Newt Gingrich |
| Home state | Texas | Georgia |
| Delegate count | 0 | 0 |
| Popular vote | 87,858 | 45,978 |
| Percentage | 11.15% | 5.83% |
- Wisconsin results by county Mitt Romney Rick Santorum

The 2012 Wisconsin Republican presidential primary took place on April 3, 2012, the same day as the primaries in the District of Columbia and Maryland. Mitt Romney edged out a victory, with 44.03% of the vote and 33 delegates, with former Senator Rick Santorum of Pennsylvania coming in second with 36.83% of the vote and 9 delegates. No other candidates won any delegates nor counties, though representative Ron Paul of Texas's 14th district received 11.15% and former Speaker of the House Newt Gingrich received 5.84%. All other candidates received less than 1%. Romney's strength was concentrated in Southeast Wisconsin, carrying Milwaukee and all of its suburbs (including the Kenosha and Racine as well as the ancestrally Republican counties of Ozaukee, Washington, and Waukesha), as well as Madison. Santorum's most significant victories were in Western Wisconsin and in Green Bay and its respective suburbs.

2012 Wisconsin Republican presidential primary
| Candidate | Votes | Percentage | Delegates |
|---|---|---|---|
| Mitt Romney | 346,876 | 44.03% | 33 |
| Rick Santorum | 290,139 | 36.83% | 9 |
| Ron Paul | 87,858 | 11.15% | 0 |
| Newt Gingrich | 45,978 | 5.84% | 0 |
| Michele Bachmann | 6,045 | 0.77% | 0 |
| Jon Huntsman | 5,083 | 0.65% | 0 |
| Uninstructed | 4,200 | 0.53% | 0 |
| Scattering | 1,668 | 0.21% | 0 |
| Total: | 787,847 | 100% | 42 |

== General election ==
=== Predictions ===
| Source | Ranking | As of |
|---|---|---|
| Huffington Post | Lean D | November 6, 2012 |
| CNN | Tossup | November 6, 2012 |
| New York Times | Tossup | November 6, 2012 |
| Washington Post | Tossup | November 6, 2012 |
| RealClearPolitics | Tossup | November 6, 2012 |
| Sabato's Crystal Ball | Lean D | November 5, 2012 |
| FiveThirtyEight | Solid D | November 6, 2012 |

=== Results ===
Although Republican vice presidential nominee Paul Ryan was from Wisconsin, representing the 1st district in Congress, the Republican Party lost by around a seven-point margin, which was, albeit an improved loss from Obama's landslide 13.91% margin in 2008, a crucial loss.

2012 United States presidential election in Wisconsin
| Party | Candidate | Running mate | Votes | Percentage | Electoral votes |
|---|---|---|---|---|---|
| Democratic | Barack Obama (incumbent) | Joe Biden (incumbent) | 1,620,985 | 52.83% | 10 |
| Republican | Mitt Romney | Paul Ryan | 1,407,966 | 45.89% | 0 |
| Libertarian | Gary Johnson | Jim Gray | 20,439 | 0.67% | 0 |
| Green | Jill Stein | Cheri Honkala | 7,665 | 0.25% | 0 |
| Write-Ins | Write-Ins | | 5,170 | 0.17% | 0 |
| Constitution | Virgil Goode | Jim Clymer | 4,930 | 0.16% | 0 |
| Socialist Equality | Jerry White | Phyllis Scherrer | 553 | 0.02% | 0 |
| Socialism and Liberation | Gloria La Riva | Filberto Ramirez Jr. | 526 | 0.02% | 0 |
| Justice | Rocky Anderson | Luis J. Rodriguez | 112 | 0.00% | 0 |
| Peace & Freedom | Roseanne Barr | Cindy Sheehan | 88 | 0.00% | 0 |
| Totals | | | 3,068,434 | 100.00% | 10 |

==== By county ====
| County | Barack Obama Democratic | | Mitt Romney Republican | | Various candidates Other parties | | Margin | | Total votes cast |
| County | # | % | # | % | # | % | # | % | Total votes cast |
|---|---|---|---|---|---|---|---|---|---|
| Adams | 5,552 | 53.87% | 4,644 | 45.14% | 101 | 0.99% | 898 | 8.73% | 10,287 |
| Ashland | 5,399 | 64.49% | 2,820 | 33.68% | 153 | 1.83% | 2,579 | 30.81% | 8,372 |
| Barron | 10,890 | 47.99% | 11,443 | 50.43% | 359 | 1.58% | -553 | -2.44% | 22,692 |
| Bayfield | 6,033 | 61.64% | 3,603 | 36.81% | 152 | 1.55% | 2,430 | 24.83% | 9,788 |
| Brown | 62,526 | 48.50% | 64,836 | 50.29% | 1,566 | 1.21% | -2,310 | -1.79% | 128,928 |
| Buffalo | 3,570 | 50.72% | 3,364 | 47.79% | 105 | 1.49% | 206 | 2.93% | 7,039 |
| Burnett | 3,986 | 45.94% | 4,550 | 52.44% | 141 | 1.62% | -564 | -6.50% | 8,677 |
| Calumet | 11,489 | 43.49% | 14,539 | 55.03% | 392 | 1.48% | -3,050 | -11.54% | 26,420 |
| Chippewa | 15,237 | 49.26% | 15,322 | 49.53% | 373 | 1.21% | -85 | -0.27% | 30,932 |
| Clark | 6,172 | 44.72% | 7,412 | 53.71% | 217 | 1.57% | -1,240 | -8.99% | 13,801 |
| Columbia | 17,175 | 56.23% | 13,026 | 42.64% | 345 | 1.13% | 4,149 | 13.59% | 30,546 |
| Crawford | 4,629 | 59.22% | 3,067 | 39.24% | 121 | 1.54% | 1,562 | 19.98% | 7,817 |
| Dane | 216,071 | 71.03% | 83,644 | 27.50% | 4,466 | 1.47% | 132,427 | 43.53% | 304,181 |
| Dodge | 18,762 | 42.17% | 25,211 | 56.67% | 515 | 1.16% | -6,449 | -14.50% | 44,488 |
| Door | 9,357 | 52.95% | 8,121 | 45.96% | 193 | 1.09% | 1,236 | 6.99% | 17,671 |
| Douglas | 14,863 | 64.92% | 7,705 | 33.66% | 326 | 1.42% | 7,158 | 31.26% | 22,894 |
| Dunn | 11,316 | 51.46% | 10,224 | 46.49% | 452 | 2.05% | 1,092 | 4.97% | 21,992 |
| Eau Claire | 30,666 | 55.95% | 23,256 | 42.43% | 884 | 1.62% | 7,410 | 13.52% | 54,806 |
| Florence | 953 | 36.30% | 1,645 | 62.67% | 27 | 1.03% | -692 | -26.37% | 2,625 |
| Fond du Lac | 22,379 | 41.91% | 30,355 | 56.84% | 668 | 1.25% | -7,976 | -14.93% | 53,402 |
| Forest | 2,425 | 52.17% | 2,172 | 46.73% | 51 | 1.10% | 253 | 5.44% | 4,648 |
| Grant | 13,594 | 56.06% | 10,255 | 42.29% | 399 | 1.65% | 3,339 | 13.77% | 24,248 |
| Green | 11,206 | 58.00% | 7,857 | 40.66% | 259 | 1.34% | 3,349 | 17.34% | 19,322 |
| Green Lake | 3,793 | 39.20% | 5,782 | 59.76% | 100 | 1.04% | -1,989 | -20.56% | 9,675 |
| Iowa | 8,105 | 64.66% | 4,287 | 34.20% | 142 | 1.14% | 3,818 | 30.46% | 12,534 |
| Iron | 1,784 | 49.12% | 1,790 | 49.28% | 58 | 1.60% | -6 | -0.16% | 3,632 |
| Jackson | 5,298 | 56.89% | 3,900 | 41.88% | 115 | 1.23% | 1,398 | 15.01% | 9,313 |
| Jefferson | 20,158 | 45.52% | 23,517 | 53.11% | 606 | 1.37% | -3,359 | -7.59% | 44,281 |
| Juneau | 6,242 | 52.78% | 5,411 | 45.75% | 174 | 1.47% | 831 | 7.03% | 11,827 |
| Kenosha | 44,867 | 55.46% | 34,977 | 43.24% | 1,053 | 1.30% | 9,890 | 12.22% | 80,897 |
| Kewaunee | 5,153 | 46.69% | 5,747 | 52.07% | 137 | 1.24% | -594 | -5.38% | 11,037 |
| La Crosse | 36,693 | 57.82% | 25,751 | 40.58% | 1,018 | 1.60% | 10,942 | 17.24% | 63,462 |
| Lafayette | 4,536 | 57.04% | 3,314 | 41.68% | 102 | 1.28% | 1,222 | 15.36% | 7,952 |
| Langlade | 4,573 | 43.47% | 5,816 | 55.29% | 130 | 1.24% | -1,243 | -11.82% | 10,519 |
| Lincoln | 7,563 | 49.70% | 7,455 | 48.99% | 198 | 1.31% | 108 | 0.71% | 15,216 |
| Manitowoc | 20,403 | 47.88% | 21,604 | 50.69% | 610 | 1.43% | -1,201 | -2.81% | 42,617 |
| Marathon | 32,363 | 46.32% | 36,617 | 52.41% | 882 | 1.27% | -4,254 | -6.09% | 69,862 |
| Marinette | 9,882 | 47.56% | 10,619 | 51.11% | 276 | 1.33% | -737 | -3.55% | 20,777 |
| Marquette | 4,014 | 49.52% | 3,992 | 49.25% | 99 | 1.23% | 22 | 0.27% | 8,105 |
| Menominee | 1,191 | 86.49% | 179 | 13.00% | 7 | 0.51% | 1,012 | 73.49% | 1,377 |
| Milwaukee | 332,438 | 67.49% | 154,924 | 31.45% | 5,214 | 1.06% | 177,514 | 36.04% | 492,576 |
| Monroe | 9,515 | 48.83% | 9,675 | 49.65% | 295 | 1.52% | -160 | -0.82% | 19,485 |
| Oconto | 8,865 | 44.64% | 10,741 | 54.09% | 253 | 1.27% | -1,876 | -9.45% | 19,859 |
| Oneida | 10,452 | 48.27% | 10,917 | 50.42% | 283 | 1.31% | -465 | -2.15% | 21,652 |
| Outagamie | 45,659 | 48.27% | 47,372 | 50.08% | 1,565 | 1.65% | -1,713 | -1.81% | 94,596 |
| Ozaukee | 19,159 | 34.32% | 36,077 | 64.63% | 581 | 1.05% | -16,918 | -30.31% | 55,817 |
| Pepin | 1,876 | 50.72% | 1,794 | 48.50% | 29 | 0.78% | 82 | 2.22% | 3,699 |
| Pierce | 10,235 | 48.69% | 10,397 | 49.46% | 388 | 1.85% | -162 | -0.77% | 21,020 |
| Polk | 10,073 | 44.62% | 12,094 | 53.58% | 406 | 1.80% | -2,021 | -8.96% | 22,573 |
| Portage | 22,075 | 56.12% | 16,615 | 42.24% | 647 | 1.64% | 5,460 | 13.88% | 39,337 |
| Price | 3,887 | 49.20% | 3,884 | 49.16% | 130 | 1.64% | 3 | 0.04% | 7,901 |
| Racine | 53,008 | 51.28% | 49,347 | 47.74% | 1,009 | 0.98% | 3,661 | 3.54% | 103,364 |
| Richland | 4,969 | 57.41% | 3,573 | 41.28% | 113 | 1.31% | 1,396 | 16.13% | 8,655 |
| Rock | 49,219 | 61.00% | 30,517 | 37.82% | 954 | 1.18% | 18,702 | 23.18% | 80,690 |
| Rusk | 3,397 | 47.24% | 3,676 | 51.12% | 118 | 1.64% | -279 | -3.88% | 7,191 |
| St. Croix | 19,910 | 43.07% | 25,503 | 55.17% | 812 | 1.76% | -5,593 | -12.10% | 46,225 |
| Sauk | 18,736 | 58.68% | 12,838 | 40.21% | 353 | 1.11% | 5,898 | 18.47% | 31,927 |
| Sawyer | 4,486 | 49.71% | 4,442 | 49.22% | 97 | 1.07% | 44 | 0.49% | 9,025 |
| Shawano | 9,000 | 44.38% | 11,022 | 54.35% | 257 | 1.27% | -2,022 | -9.97% | 20,279 |
| Sheboygan | 27,918 | 44.56% | 34,072 | 54.38% | 661 | 1.06% | -6,154 | -9.82% | 62,651 |
| Taylor | 3,763 | 39.56% | 5,601 | 58.88% | 148 | 1.56% | -1,838 | -19.32% | 9,512 |
| Trempealeau | 7,605 | 56.41% | 5,707 | 42.33% | 169 | 1.26% | 1,898 | 14.08% | 13,481 |
| Vernon | 8,044 | 56.37% | 5,942 | 41.64% | 283 | 1.99% | 2,102 | 14.73% | 14,269 |
| Vilas | 5,951 | 42.99% | 7,749 | 55.98% | 142 | 1.03% | -1,798 | -12.99% | 13,842 |
| Walworth | 22,552 | 43.12% | 29,006 | 55.46% | 745 | 1.42% | -6,454 | -12.34% | 52,303 |
| Washburn | 4,447 | 47.88% | 4,699 | 50.60% | 141 | 1.52% | -252 | -2.72% | 9,287 |
| Washington | 23,166 | 29.42% | 54,765 | 69.55% | 811 | 1.03% | -31,599 | -40.13% | 78,742 |
| Waukesha | 78,779 | 32.31% | 162,798 | 66.76% | 2,279 | 0.93% | -84,019 | -34.45% | 243,856 |
| Waupaca | 11,578 | 44.81% | 14,002 | 54.19% | 260 | 1.00% | -2,424 | -9.38% | 25,840 |
| Waushara | 5,335 | 44.28% | 6,562 | 54.47% | 151 | 1.25% | -1,227 | -10.19% | 12,048 |
| Winnebago | 45,449 | 50.97% | 42,122 | 47.24% | 1,602 | 1.79% | 3,327 | 3.73% | 89,173 |
| Wood | 18,581 | 47.77% | 19,704 | 50.65% | 615 | 1.58% | -1,123 | -2.88% | 38,900 |
| Totals | 1,620,985 | 52.83% | 1,407,966 | 45.89% | 39,483 | 1.29% | 213,019 | 6.94% | 3,068,434 |

Counties that flipped Democratic to Republican

- Barron (largest city: Rice Lake)
- Brown (largest city: Green Bay)
- Burnett (largest village: Grantsburg)
- Calumet (largest city: Chilton)
- Chippewa (largest city: Chippewa Falls)
- Clark (largest city: Neillsville)
- Iron (largest city: Hurley)
- Jefferson (largest city: Watertown)
- Kewaunee (largest city: Algoma)
- Langlade (largest city: Antigo)
- Manitowoc (largest city: Manitowoc)
- Marathon (largest city: Wausau)
- Marinette (largest city: Marinette)
- Monroe (largest city: Sparta)
- Oconto (largest city: Oconto)
- Oneida (largest city: Rhinelander)
- Outagamie (largest city: Appleton)
- Pierce (largest city: River Falls)
- Rusk (largest city: Ladysmith)
- Shawano (largest city: Shawano)
- Washburn (largest city: Spooner)
- Waupaca (largest city: New London)
- Waushara (largest city: Berlin)
- Wood (largest city: Marshfield)

==== By congressional district ====
Despite losing the state, Romney won five of eight congressional districts.

| District | Romney | Obama | Representative |
|---|---|---|---|
| 1st | 51.65% | 47.44% | Paul Ryan |
| 2nd | 30.46% | 68.3% | Mark Pocan |
| 3rd | 43.82% | 54.82% | Ron Kind |
| 4th | 23.78% | 75.33% | Gwen Moore |
| 5th | 61.31% | 37.75% | Jim Sensenbrenner |
| 6th | 53.1% | 45.77% | Tom Petri |
| 7th | 50.92% | 47.83% | Sean Duffy |
| 8th | 51.26% | 47.56% | Reid Ribble |

== Analysis ==
Obama's win was attributed to victories in Milwaukee, the state's largest city; Madison, the state capital; northwestern Wisconsin; and the Driftless Region. Romney's strength was concentrated in the loyally Republican Milwaukee suburbs, particularly the WOW counties (Ozaukee, Washington, and Waukesha), where he carried a combined 67.03% of the vote to Obama's 32.00%. He also flipped 24 counties in the Northeast and Central Plain regions, though most of them were rural and, therefore, insufficient to overcome Obama's aforementioned victories. Obama nonetheless became the first Democrat to win the White House without carrying Iron County since Woodrow Wilson in 1916 and Pierce County since 1960. The latter county voted Republican for the first time since 1984.

As of 2024, this is the last time the Democratic presidential nominee won the following counties: Adams, Buffalo, Columbia, Crawford, Dunn, Forest, Grant, Jackson, Juneau, Kenosha, Lafayette, Lincoln, Marquette, Pepin, Price, Racine, Richland, Sawyer, Trempealeau, Vernon, and Winnebago. This remains the last time that any candidate won Wisconsin with more than 50% of the vote or by more than 1 percentage point.

== See also ==
- United States presidential elections in Wisconsin
- 2012 Republican Party presidential debates and forums
- 2012 Republican Party presidential primaries
- Results of the 2012 Republican Party presidential primaries
- Wisconsin Republican Party
