= 1964 United States presidential election in Wisconsin =

- November 3, 1964

| Nominee | Lyndon B. Johnson | Barry Goldwater |
| Party | Democratic | Republican |
| Home state | Texas | Arizona |
| Running mate | Hubert Humphrey | William E. Miller |
| Electoral vote | 12 | 0 |
| Popular vote | 1,050,424 | 638,495 |
| Percentage | 62.09% | 37.74% |

Johnson
50–60%
60–70%
70–80%
80–90%
90–100%
Goldwater
50–60%
60–70%
70–80%
80–90%
90–100%
President before election
Lyndon B. Johnson
Democratic
Elected President
Lyndon B. Johnson
Democratic

The 1964 United States presidential election in Wisconsin was held on November 3, 1964, as part of 1964 United States presidential election. State voters chose 12 electors to the Electoral College, who voted for president and vice president.

== Background ==
Politics in Wisconsin since the Populist movement had been dominated by the Republican Party, as the upper classes, along with the majority of workers who followed them, fled from William Jennings Bryan's agrarian and free silver sympathies. Competition between the "League" under Robert M. La Follette, and the conservative "Regular" faction would develop into the Wisconsin Progressive Party in the late 1930s, which was opposed to the conservative German Democrats and to the national Republican Party, and allied with Franklin D. Roosevelt at the federal level. During the two wartime elections, the formerly Democratic German counties in the east of the state – which had been powerfully opposed to the Civil War because they saw it as a "Yankee" war and opposed the military draft instituted during it – viewed Communism as a much greater threat to America than Nazism and consequently opposed President Roosevelt's war effort. Consequently, these historically Democratic counties became virtually the most Republican in the entire state, and became a major support base for populist conservative Senator Joe McCarthy, who became notorious for his investigations into Communists inside the American government. The state's populace's opposition to Communism and the Korean War turned Wisconsin strongly to Republican nominee Dwight D. Eisenhower in the 1952 and 1956 presidential elections.

The 1958 midterm elections, however, saw a major change in Wisconsin politics, as Gaylord A. Nelson became only the state's second Democratic Governor since 1895, and the state also elected Democrats to the position of treasurer and Senator, besides that party gaining a majority in the State Assembly for only the second time since the middle 1890s. They maintained a close balance in the early 1960s, signaling the state's transition to a swing state.

== Primaries ==
Primary elections were held in Wisconsin as part of the election process of delegates to both major party presidential nominating conventions (the 1964 Democratic National Convention and the 1964 Republican National Convention). The 1964 primaries saw low-turnout.

In the Democratic primary, Wisconsin Governor John W. Reynolds Jr. stood-in as a favorite son supportive of nominating President Johnson at the convention won a large lead. Trailing him was George Wallace (seeking the nomination for himself), who received approximately half as many votes as Reynolds. Despite losing by a sizable margin, Wallace was still regarded to have received a much larger-than-expected share of the vote. Wallace received nearly as many votes as Byrnes had received in winning the coinciding Republican primary, and performed particularly well in some white ethnic wards of Milwaukee as well as several conservative Republican-leaning suburbs.

In the Republican primary, Green Bay-based U.S. Congressman John W. Byrnes ran as a favorite son in a successful ploy to send an uncommitted Wisconsin delegation to the party's convention. After winning the state's delegates in the primary, Byrnes released them to become unbound delegates at the convention.

== General election campaign ==
During the Republican primaries, Wisconsin supported favorite son Byrnes, but no other state joined him. Ultimate Republican nominee Barry Goldwater considered Wisconsin a useful state to combine with his Southern and Western strategy for winning the presidency and directing the GOP away from the declining Yankee Northeast. The Republican would campaign in Wisconsin late in September, but met with severe hostility at the University of Wisconsin-Madison. Signs saying "Bring the Bomb—Back Barry" were common in Madison.

Nevertheless, early polls showed incumbent President Lyndon B. Johnson leading Goldwater comfortably, despite predictions of a severe backlash to the Civil Rights Act from Wisconsin's anti-black German-American and Polish-American populations. Extreme fears of financial loss for farmers accounted for a 66–28 lead for Johnson in September, while fear of Goldwater's policy of strategic use of nuclear weapons, rather than enthusiasm for the domestic and foreign policies of President Johnson, was cited as the cause of the President's continuing strong lead one month later.

== General election results ==
Johnson won Wisconsin by a margin of 24.35 percent. Goldwater held up slightly better in the German areas where conservative Republicanism had been established by anti-World War II sentiment, whilst he lost heavily in the Yankee counties of the south. As of the 2024 presidential election, this is nonetheless the last election in which Wisconsin voted to the right of Alaska or Ohio, but also the last in which Dodge County, Fond du Lac County, Green Lake County, Ozaukee County, Vilas County, Washington County, and Waukesha County (Note: By that extension, any of the WOW counties) voted for a Democratic presidential candidate.

1964 United States presidential election in Wisconsin
| Party | Candidate | Votes | Percentage | Electoral votes |
|---|---|---|---|---|
| Democratic | Lyndon B. Johnson (incumbent) | 1,050,424 | 62.09% | 12 |
| Republican | Barry Goldwater | 638,495 | 37.74% | 0 |
| Socialist Workers (Note: "Independent Socialist Workers") | Clifton DeBerry | 1,692 | 0.10% | 0 |
| Socialist Labor (Note: "Independent Socialist Labor") | Eric Hass | 1,204 | 0.07% | 0 |
| Totals | | 1,691,815 | 100.00% | 12 |

=== Results by county ===
| County | Lyndon B. Johnson Democratic | | Barry Goldwater Republican | | Clifton DeBerry Socialist Workers | | Eric Hass Socialist Labor | | Margin | | Total votes cast |
| County | # | % | # | % | # | % | # | % | # | % | Total votes cast |
|---|---|---|---|---|---|---|---|---|---|---|---|
| Adams | 2,262 | 64.83% | 1,219 | 34.94% | 3 | 0.09% | 5 | 0.14% | 1,043 | 29.89% | 3,489 |
| Ashland | 5,383 | 70.91% | 2,198 | 28.96% | 6 | 0.08% | 4 | 0.05% | 3,185 | 41.95% | 7,591 |
| Barron | 8,332 | 59.28% | 5,701 | 40.56% | 17 | 0.12% | 6 | 0.04% | 2,631 | 18.72% | 14,056 |
| Bayfield | 3,875 | 67.08% | 1,886 | 32.65% | 14 | 0.24% | 2 | 0.03% | 1,989 | 34.43% | 5,777 |
| Brown | 30,851 | 59.26% | 21,134 | 40.59% | 61 | 0.12% | 18 | 0.03% | 9,717 | 18.67% | 52,064 |
| Buffalo | 3,663 | 63.60% | 2,091 | 36.31% | 5 | 0.09% | 0 | 0.00% | 1,572 | 27.29% | 5,759 |
| Burnett | 2,921 | 65.45% | 1,536 | 34.42% | 5 | 0.11% | 1 | 0.02% | 1,385 | 31.03% | 4,463 |
| Calumet | 5,356 | 57.75% | 3,905 | 42.11% | 10 | 0.11% | 3 | 0.03% | 1,451 | 15.64% | 9,274 |
| Chippewa | 10,911 | 63.38% | 6,277 | 36.46% | 18 | 0.10% | 8 | 0.05% | 4,634 | 26.92% | 17,214 |
| Clark | 7,781 | 61.25% | 4,897 | 38.55% | 16 | 0.13% | 10 | 0.08% | 2,884 | 22.70% | 12,704 |
| Columbia | 10,093 | 61.66% | 6,253 | 38.20% | 17 | 0.10% | 7 | 0.04% | 3,840 | 23.46% | 16,370 |
| Crawford | 3,930 | 58.98% | 2,726 | 40.91% | 4 | 0.06% | 3 | 0.05% | 1,204 | 18.07% | 6,663 |
| Dane | 68,118 | 71.38% | 27,124 | 28.42% | 83 | 0.09% | 101 | 0.11% | 40,994 | 42.96% | 95,426 |
| Dodge | 15,497 | 58.91% | 10,772 | 40.95% | 30 | 0.11% | 9 | 0.03% | 4,725 | 17.96% | 26,308 |
| Door | 4,416 | 50.68% | 4,289 | 49.22% | 8 | 0.09% | 1 | 0.01% | 127 | 1.46% | 8,714 |
| Douglas | 15,237 | 76.80% | 4,579 | 23.08% | 12 | 0.06% | 11 | 0.06% | 10,658 | 53.72% | 19,839 |
| Dunn | 6,475 | 61.91% | 3,964 | 37.90% | 14 | 0.13% | 5 | 0.05% | 2,511 | 24.01% | 10,458 |
| Eau Claire | 15,775 | 64.33% | 8,700 | 35.48% | 34 | 0.14% | 12 | 0.05% | 7,075 | 28.85% | 24,521 |
| Florence | 1,029 | 63.25% | 596 | 36.63% | 1 | 0.06% | 1 | 0.06% | 433 | 26.62% | 1,627 |
| Fond du Lac | 18,040 | 58.61% | 12,708 | 41.29% | 26 | 0.08% | 4 | 0.01% | 5,332 | 17.32% | 30,778 |
| Forest | 2,479 | 69.79% | 1,069 | 30.10% | 3 | 0.08% | 1 | 0.03% | 1,410 | 39.69% | 3,552 |
| Grant | 9,309 | 54.09% | 7,872 | 45.74% | 16 | 0.09% | 14 | 0.08% | 1,437 | 8.35% | 17,211 |
| Green | 5,548 | 50.76% | 5,364 | 49.08% | 14 | 0.13% | 3 | 0.03% | 184 | 1.68% | 10,929 |
| Green Lake | 3,893 | 50.12% | 3,871 | 49.83% | 2 | 0.03% | 2 | 0.03% | 22 | 0.29% | 7,768 |
| Iowa | 4,620 | 58.43% | 3,275 | 41.42% | 9 | 0.11% | 3 | 0.04% | 1,345 | 17.01% | 7,907 |
| Iron | 2,514 | 72.24% | 963 | 27.67% | 2 | 0.06% | 1 | 0.03% | 1,551 | 44.57% | 3,480 |
| Jackson | 3,818 | 60.06% | 2,532 | 39.83% | 6 | 0.09% | 1 | 0.02% | 1,286 | 20.23% | 6,357 |
| Jefferson | 13,295 | 60.20% | 8,741 | 39.58% | 28 | 0.13% | 20 | 0.09% | 4,554 | 20.62% | 22,084 |
| Juneau | 4,583 | 60.57% | 2,976 | 39.33% | 5 | 0.07% | 3 | 0.04% | 1,607 | 21.24% | 7,567 |
| Kenosha | 30,522 | 67.29% | 14,764 | 32.55% | 40 | 0.09% | 30 | 0.07% | 15,758 | 34.74% | 45,356 |
| Kewaunee | 4,792 | 61.59% | 2,980 | 38.30% | 6 | 0.08% | 2 | 0.03% | 1,812 | 23.29% | 7,780 |
| La Crosse | 16,625 | 55.78% | 13,135 | 44.07% | 26 | 0.09% | 17 | 0.06% | 3,490 | 11.71% | 29,803 |
| Lafayette | 4,471 | 58.28% | 3,194 | 41.64% | 4 | 0.05% | 2 | 0.03% | 1,277 | 16.64% | 7,671 |
| Langlade | 5,077 | 62.83% | 2,994 | 37.05% | 8 | 0.10% | 2 | 0.02% | 2,083 | 25.78% | 8,081 |
| Lincoln | 5,883 | 60.06% | 3,894 | 39.75% | 10 | 0.10% | 9 | 0.09% | 1,989 | 20.31% | 9,796 |
| Manitowoc | 21,927 | 68.92% | 9,849 | 30.96% | 24 | 0.08% | 15 | 0.05% | 12,078 | 37.96% | 31,815 |
| Marathon | 24,603 | 65.74% | 12,766 | 34.11% | 38 | 0.10% | 19 | 0.05% | 11,837 | 31.63% | 37,426 |
| Marinette | 9,657 | 64.32% | 5,332 | 35.52% | 12 | 0.08% | 12 | 0.08% | 4,325 | 28.80% | 15,013 |
| Marquette | 1,927 | 50.50% | 1,881 | 49.29% | 8 | 0.21% | 0 | 0.00% | 46 | 1.21% | 3,816 |
| Menominee | 647 | 89.12% | 78 | 10.74% | 1 | 0.14% | 0 | 0.00% | 569 | 78.38% | 726 |
| Milwaukee | 288,577 | 65.67% | 149,962 | 34.12% | 401 | 0.09% | 519 | 0.12% | 138,615 | 31.55% | 439,459 |
| Monroe | 6,385 | 55.41% | 5,126 | 44.48% | 7 | 0.06% | 6 | 0.05% | 1,259 | 10.93% | 11,524 |
| Oconto | 6,360 | 58.92% | 4,420 | 40.94% | 11 | 0.10% | 4 | 0.04% | 1,940 | 17.98% | 10,795 |
| Oneida | 6,431 | 62.11% | 3,909 | 37.75% | 10 | 0.10% | 5 | 0.05% | 2,522 | 24.36% | 10,355 |
| Outagamie | 21,556 | 53.62% | 18,595 | 46.26% | 35 | 0.09% | 12 | 0.03% | 2,961 | 7.36% | 40,198 |
| Ozaukee | 9,517 | 52.51% | 8,581 | 47.35% | 15 | 0.08% | 10 | 0.06% | 936 | 5.16% | 18,123 |
| Pepin | 2,154 | 66.71% | 1,069 | 33.11% | 4 | 0.12% | 2 | 0.06% | 1,085 | 33.60% | 3,229 |
| Pierce | 6,351 | 65.70% | 3,291 | 34.05% | 14 | 0.14% | 10 | 0.10% | 3,060 | 31.65% | 9,666 |
| Polk | 7,215 | 65.57% | 3,754 | 34.12% | 18 | 0.16% | 16 | 0.15% | 3,461 | 31.45% | 11,003 |
| Portage | 11,887 | 72.05% | 4,579 | 27.75% | 21 | 0.13% | 11 | 0.07% | 7,308 | 44.30% | 16,498 |
| Price | 4,289 | 63.97% | 2,406 | 35.88% | 7 | 0.10% | 3 | 0.04% | 1,883 | 28.09% | 6,705 |
| Racine | 37,785 | 63.71% | 21,434 | 36.14% | 52 | 0.09% | 35 | 0.06% | 16,351 | 27.57% | 59,306 |
| Richland | 4,315 | 57.17% | 3,224 | 42.71% | 6 | 0.08% | 3 | 0.04% | 1,091 | 14.46% | 7,548 |
| Rock | 28,257 | 58.04% | 20,372 | 41.85% | 44 | 0.09% | 11 | 0.02% | 7,885 | 16.19% | 48,684 |
| Rusk | 4,176 | 65.20% | 2,214 | 34.57% | 7 | 0.11% | 8 | 0.12% | 1,962 | 30.63% | 6,405 |
| Sauk | 9,288 | 59.33% | 6,345 | 40.53% | 12 | 0.08% | 11 | 0.07% | 2,943 | 18.80% | 15,656 |
| Sawyer | 2,591 | 56.17% | 2,012 | 43.62% | 7 | 0.15% | 3 | 0.07% | 579 | 12.55% | 4,613 |
| Shawano | 6,560 | 50.06% | 6,519 | 49.74% | 18 | 0.14% | 8 | 0.06% | 41 | 0.32% | 13,105 |
| Sheboygan | 26,410 | 66.95% | 12,968 | 32.88% | 48 | 0.12% | 19 | 0.05% | 13,442 | 34.07% | 39,445 |
| St. Croix | 8,864 | 65.86% | 4,565 | 33.92% | 16 | 0.12% | 13 | 0.10% | 4,299 | 31.94% | 13,458 |
| Taylor | 4,624 | 67.03% | 2,261 | 32.78% | 10 | 0.14% | 3 | 0.04% | 2,363 | 34.25% | 6,898 |
| Trempealeau | 6,320 | 65.91% | 3,264 | 34.04% | 3 | 0.03% | 2 | 0.02% | 3,056 | 31.87% | 9,589 |
| Vernon | 6,242 | 57.28% | 4,640 | 42.58% | 11 | 0.10% | 5 | 0.05% | 1,602 | 14.70% | 10,898 |
| Vilas | 2,841 | 50.03% | 2,827 | 49.78% | 3 | 0.05% | 8 | 0.14% | 14 | 0.25% | 5,679 |
| Walworth | 11,746 | 48.92% | 12,225 | 50.92% | 30 | 0.12% | 8 | 0.03% | −479 | −2.00% | 24,009 |
| Washburn | 3,181 | 62.84% | 1,865 | 36.84% | 8 | 0.16% | 8 | 0.16% | 1,316 | 26.00% | 5,062 |
| Washington | 11,563 | 55.62% | 9,191 | 44.21% | 27 | 0.13% | 10 | 0.05% | 2,372 | 11.41% | 20,791 |
| Waukesha | 39,796 | 52.76% | 35,502 | 47.07% | 85 | 0.11% | 46 | 0.06% | 4,294 | 5.69% | 75,429 |
| Waupaca | 6,990 | 45.42% | 8,381 | 54.46% | 15 | 0.10% | 3 | 0.02% | −1,391 | −9.04% | 15,389 |
| Waushara | 3,004 | 46.64% | 3,437 | 53.36% | 0 | 0.00% | 0 | 0.00% | −433 | −6.72% | 6,441 |
| Winnebago | 23,636 | 52.72% | 21,084 | 47.03% | 85 | 0.19% | 30 | 0.07% | 2,552 | 5.69% | 44,835 |
| Wood | 15,378 | 64.65% | 8,388 | 35.26% | 16 | 0.07% | 5 | 0.02% | 6,990 | 29.39% | 23,787 |
| Totals | 1,050,424 | 62.09% | 638,495 | 37.74% | 1,692 | 0.10% | 1,204 | 0.07% | 411,929 | 24.35% | 1,691,815 |

==== Counties that flipped from Republican to Democratic ====
- Adams
- Barron
- Buffalo
- Burnett
- Calumet
- Clark
- Columbia
- Crawford
- Dodge
- Door
- Dunn
- Eau Claire
- Florence
- Fond du Lac
- Grant
- Green
- Green Lake
- Iowa
- Jackson
- Jefferson
- Juneau
- La Crosse
- Lafayette
- Langlade
- Lincoln
- Marathon
- Marinette
- Marquette
- Monroe
- Oconto
- Oneida
- Outagamie
- Ozaukee
- Pierce
- Polk
- Price
- Richland
- Rock
- Sauk
- Sawyer
- Shawano
- Sheboygan
- St. Croix
- Trempealeau
- Vernon
- Vilas
- Washburn
- Washington
- Waukesha
- Winnebago
- Wood

== Electors ==
These were the names of the electors on each ticket.

| Lyndon B. Johnson & Hubert Humphrey Democratic Party | Barry Goldwater & William E. Miller Republican Party | Clifton DeBerry & Ed Shaw Socialist Workers Party | Eric Hass & Henning A. Blomen Socialist Labor Party |
|---|---|---|---|
| George Molinaro; Fred A. Risser; Theodore J. Griswold; Kenneth Dunlap; Robert Ertl; Kenneth Kunde; Thomas Martin; John C. Moore; Edward Mertz; Arthur DeBardeleben; J. Louis Hanson; Patrick L. Lucey | Warren P. Knowles; Jack B. Olson; William R. Merriam; Frank E. Panzer; George Thompson; Ervin King; Robert Heckel; Lucius Chase; Clifford W. Krueger; John W. Byrnes; Jerris Leonard; Willis J. Hutnik | James E. Boulton; Wayne Leverenz; Albert Stergar; Ted Odell; Myrtle C. Kastner; Betsy Stergar; Florence Kirkland; Earl Plaster; Elaine Goodreau; James Eyman; Duane Witkowski; Lorraine Fons | Pauline Adolphe; Artemio Cozzini; Georgia Cozzini; Marko Golubich; Samuel Munek; Henry A. Ochsner; William Schlingman; Stella Semrau; Walter Semrau; Thomas Vidakovich; Arthur Wepfer; Agnes Wiggert |

== See also ==
- United States presidential elections in Wisconsin

== Works cited ==
- Black, Earl; Black, Merle (1992). The Vital South: How Presidents Are Elected. Harvard University Press. ISBN 0674941306.
