= WOW counties =

Three Wisconsin counties around Milwaukee

Map of Wisconsin highlighting WOW Counties

The WOW counties is a colloquial name used to describe three counties in southeast Wisconsin; Waukesha, Ozaukee, and Washington County. These three counties border Milwaukee County to the west, north, and northwest, respectively, and are part of the Milwaukee metropolitan area.

== Demographics ==
Historical population
Census	Pop.	Note	%±
1860	66,135		—
1870	67,757		2.5%
1880	67,860		0.2%
1890	70,964		4.6%
1900	75,181		5.9%
1910	78,007		3.8%
1920	84,660		8.5%
1930	96,303		13.8%
1940	110,159		14.4%
1950	143,164		30.0%
1960	242,809		69.6%
1970	349,625		44.0%
1980	432,155		23.6%
1990	472,874		9.4%
2000	560,577		18.5%
2010	608,173		8.5%
2020	635,242		4.5%

Collectively, the three counties have a population of 641,131 as of July 2022. Like the collar counties surrounding Chicago, these counties have a primarily white population, and unusually so considering the trend of suburbs around cities in the Rust Belt region becoming more racially diverse. Racine County, to the south of Milwaukee County, has similar demographics outside the city of Racine (though some communities have lower average income), but is usually not included. As a consequence of racial demographics, the WOW suburbs of Milwaukee have remained solidly Republican, but have experienced the national trend of the suburbs shifting to the left politically.

== History ==
Historically, the WOW counties were among the most Republican areas in the state, consistently voting for the party by bigger margins than most other major suburbs north of the Mason–Dixon line. With the GOP's increasing trend toward right-wing populism under Donald Trump, however, several rural areas of Wisconsin have become significantly more Republican than the WOW counties in most races. While the WOW counties remain solidly Republican, the party's landslides have diminished somewhat in the Trump era, shrinking from a margin of 35 points in 2012, to 22 points in 2024.

This has been attributed to moderate suburban Republicans, who have rejected right-wing populism and hardcore conservatism. Washington County has stayed the most strongly Republican of the three counties. Waukesha and Ozaukee have experienced significant leftward shifts, although both remain solidly Republican.

=== State and local level ===
All county offices are held by Republicans; there are almost no elected Democrats above the county level. None of the counties have supported a Democrat for president since Lyndon Johnson's national landslide of 1964. In 2008, while Barack Obama carried Wisconsin by 14 points and won 59 out of 72 counties, the three counties were his weakest and the only ones in the state where he won less than 40 percent of the county's vote. No Democratic presidential candidate carried a single municipality in the counties between 1996 and 2020, when Joe Biden narrowly flipped the city of Cedarburg in Ozaukee County. The vast majority of the state party's voter turnout efforts (along with those of outside organizations) were, for many years, focused on maximizing turnout from those three counties to counteract the turnout from Milwaukee and Dane counties (home to Milwaukee and Madison) and the cities of Racine and Kenosha, which generally lean Democratic. The counties also represented the heart of Scott Walker's electoral coalitions during his three wins for Governor (2010, 2012, and 2014), garnering over 70% of the vote in all three counties.

However, Scott Walker's vote share fell to 66% and 63% in Waukesha and Ozaukee in 2018 respectively, contributing to his 1.1% statewide loss to Democrat Tony Evers. In 2022, Tony Evers won re-election by 3.4%, in part due to further gains in the WOW counties. Although the counties stayed solidly Republican, Evers won 39.43% of the vote in Waukesha, 44.12% in Ozaukee, and 30.66% in Washington, far exceeding his prior performance in them in 2018.

In the U.S. House of Representatives, the counties are almost entirely within Wisconsin's 5th and 6th congressional districts. They are represented by Republicans Scott Fitzgerald and Glenn Grothman respectively.

=== Presidential level ===
The electoral importance of these counties for Republicans, Waukesha in particular, has caused some political commentators to dub it "crucial Waukesha county". The WOW counties are seen as crucial for Republicans to offset Democratic strength in Dane and Milwaukee counties.

With the recent Republican trend in rural Wisconsin, however, GOP turnout efforts have become focused on maximizing rural turnout at the expense of turnout in Milwaukee, Madison, Racine, and Kenosha, as well as the growing Democratic turnout in the WOW counties. This was a factor in Trump's 2016 upset win in Wisconsin, a feat he could not replicate in 2020 as the WOW counties shifted left. Although Trump received over 60% of the vote in the 3 counties in all of his runs, his margins in them are significantly lower than prior Republicans in the 21st century.

Local conservative talk radio stations such as WISN (1130) and the late morning and midday shows of WTMJ (620) have long targeted their programs' topics and talking points more to the WOW counties rather than their city of license, Milwaukee.

Ozaukee County is the least Republican-leaning of the three counties, while Washington County is the most Republican-leaning. Waukesha County is the most populous of the three counties.

=== Electoral history ===
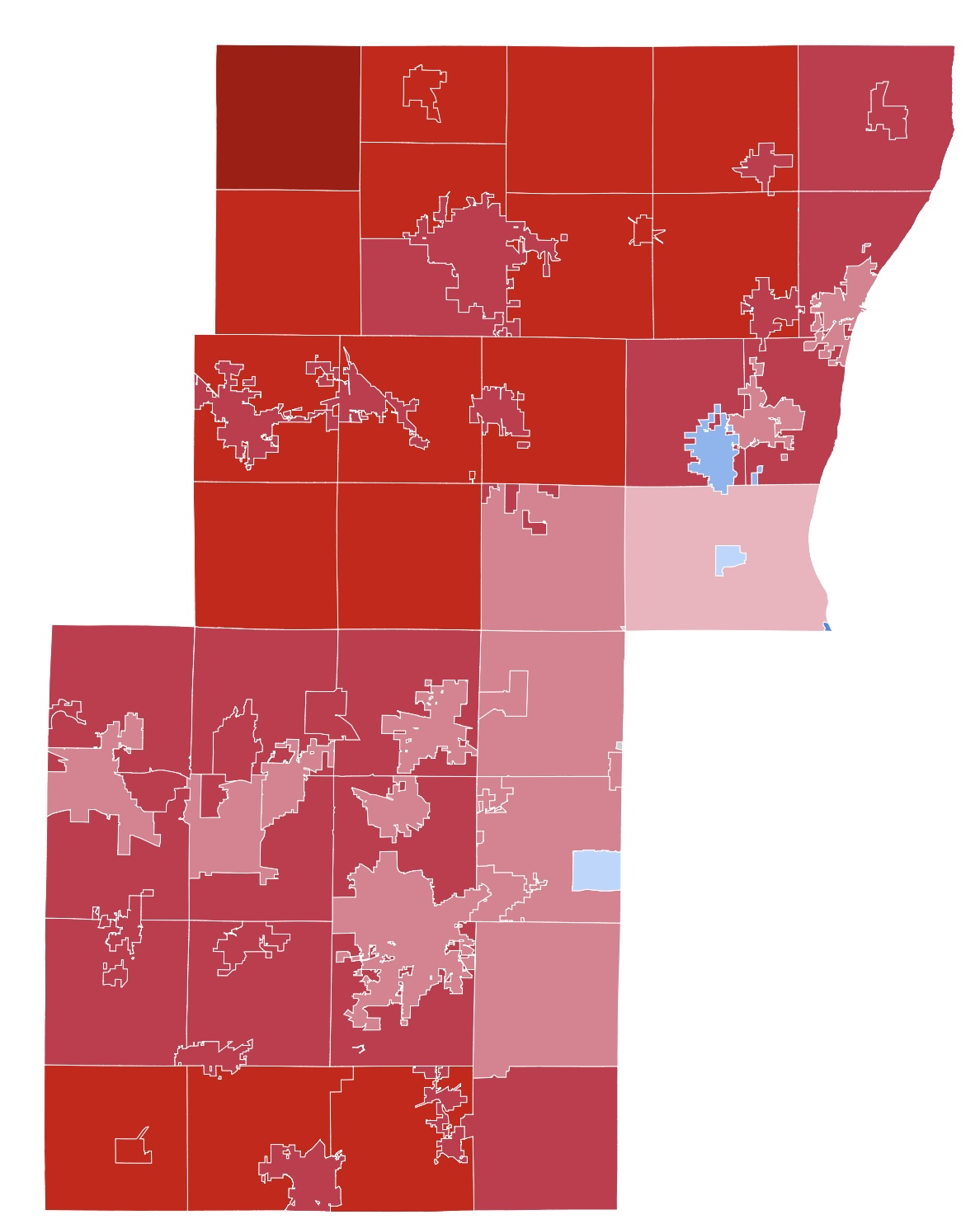
2024 United States presidential election in the WOW counties by municipality. Notably, Kamala Harris became the first Democrat to win a municipality in more than one of the counties in decades. Harris won the communities of Cedarburg, Thiensville, and Elm Grove, with significant gains in areas bordering Milwaukee.

The WOW counties, both individually and as a collective, have voted for 20 of the 21 most recent Republican presidential campaigns, and in the most recent election that the Democratic Party took the region, Barry Goldwater lost by about 6.5% in an election where he lost Wisconsin by a margin of roughly 24.3%.

Democratic presidential nominee Kamala Harris won 38.69% of the vote in the WOW counties in 2024, the highest percentage since 1976, despite losing both Wisconsin and the 2024 United States presidential election. Notably, the WOW counties and Door County were the only Wisconsin counties to swing towards Democrats in 2024 in Wisconsin.

Presidential election results
Year	Republican	Democratic
2024	60.78% 258,858	38.69% 164,838
2020	60.88% 253,780	37.67% 157,029
2016	60.92% 224,747	32.59% 120,246
2012	67.03% 253,640	32.00% 121,104
2008	62.40% 225,053	36.50% 131,637
2004	67.57% 240,471	31.63% 112,574
2000	65.65% 205,422	31.15% 97,464
1996	55.15% 139,636	34.67% 87,777
1992	50.34% 137,005	27.74% 75,488
1988	61.13% 137,694	38.25% 86,166
1984	66.13% 141,603	33.18% 71,044
1980	58.81% 125,643	32.92% 70,335
1976	58.34% 109,033	39.15% 73,180
1972	60.29% 90,496	35.65% 53,510
1968	55.48% 72,151	36.37% 47,297
1964	46.59% 53,274	53.24% 60,876
1960	57.73% 61,233	42.16% 44,714
1956	69.86% 57,187	29.42% 24,082
1952	67.67% 51,529	32.33% 24,437
1948	55.13% 29,066	44.87% 22,606
1944	60.88% 32,571	39.12% 20,457
1940	57.91% 30,140	42.09% 21,204

United States Senate election results for WOW Counties, WisconsinClass 1
Year	Republican		Democratic		Third party(ies)	
Year	No.	%	No.	%	No.	%
2024	259,647	60.74%	161,029	37.67%	6,787	1.59%
2018	212,680	62.29%	128,641	37.68%	93	0.03%
2012	247,701	66.46%	116,317	31.21%	8,715	2.34%
2006	124,078	46.38%	135,940	50.81%	7,524	2.81%
2000	162,317	53.05%	140,534	45.93%	3,140	1.03%
1994	99,304	56.46%	75,712	43.04%	882	0.50%

United States Senate election results for WOW Counties, WisconsinClass 3
Year	Republican		Democratic		Third party(ies)	
Year	No.	%	No.	%	No.	%
2022	222,761	63.65%	126,924	36.27%	276	0.08%
2016	252,657	68.35%	109,729	29.69%	7,248	1.96%
2010	207,780	71.74%	81,584	28.17%	274	0.09%
2004	217,813	61.95%	132,511	37.69%	1,297	0.37%
1998	129,836	63.70%	72,126	35.38%	1,878	0.92%
1992	154,362	57.71%	109,680	41.01%	3,431	1.28%

== See also ==
BOW counties
