= 1976 United States presidential election in Wisconsin =

- November 2, 1976

| Nominee | Jimmy Carter | Gerald Ford |
| Party | Democratic | Republican |
| Home state | Georgia | Michigan |
| Running mate | Walter Mondale | Bob Dole |
| Electoral vote | 11 | 0 |
| Popular vote | 1,040,232 | 1,004,987 |
| Percentage | 49.50% | 47.83% |
County results
Carter
40–50%
50–60%
60–70%
Ford
40–50%
50–60%
60–70%
President before election
Gerald Ford
Republican
Elected President
Jimmy Carter
Democratic

The 1976 United States presidential election in Wisconsin took place on November 2, 1976, as part of the 1976 United States presidential election. Jimmy Carter won the state of Wisconsin with 49.50 percent of the vote giving him 11 electoral votes.

In September, President Ford announced he would devote $20,000 to campaigning in Wisconsin. The state was one of ten he considered critical to defeating Carter, but Ford devoted less money to it than any of the others. During his campaign, Ford focused chiefly on the Catholic working-class electorate in South Milwaukee, whose hierarchy had been disappointed Carter was not committed – following Roe v. Wade – to a constitutional amendment banning abortion.

Carter himself responded by visiting white ethnic communities in the state during September. His campaign amongst the Polish-Americans and Greek-Americans in the southeast of the state was strongly aimed at Ford's policy towards the totalitarian regimes of Eastern Europe and their human rights violations.

In early October, polls showed Wisconsin as a tossup. Aided by a return of traditionally Democratic Catholic voters and a gain amongst nonpartisans, Carter established a lead in mid-October polls. The Georgia Governor would retain this lead to election day, and carry Wisconsin by 1.68 points. This result nonetheless made Wisconsin 0.43% more Republican than the nation at large. Wisconsin was the tipping-point state of the election.

Ronald Reagan would flip Wisconsin back into the Republican column in 1980 and 1984, but Carter's victory was a sign of things to come for the state, as it would transition into a Democratic-leaning swing state in 1988, and would vote Republican only twice since then.

== Primaries ==
=== Democratic primaries ===
Despite the fact that at the time of this election Wisconsin had been dominated for a decade by very liberal Democrats like Senators Gaylord Nelson and William Proxmire, and had been the fifth-best state for George McGovern in his landslide 1972 presidential defeat, Georgia Governor Jimmy Carter won the state on a "nonideological" campaign in the April primaries, despite claiming that price floors for dairy farmers in the nation's leading dairy state would need to be lowered.

- Jimmy Carter – 36.63%
- Mo Udall – 35.62%
- George Wallace – 12.49%
- Scoop Jackson – 6.43%

=== Republican primaries ===
Gerald Ford won the GOP primary against the insurgent conservative challenge of Ronald Reagan, saying that his win was largely due to the endorsement of Henry Kissinger.

- Gerald Ford (incumbent) – 55.23%
- Ronald Reagan – 44.29%

== Results ==
1976 United States presidential election in Wisconsin
| Party | Candidate | Votes | Percentage | Electoral votes |
|---|---|---|---|---|
| Democratic | Jimmy Carter | 1,040,232 | 49.50% | 11 |
| Republican | Gerald Ford (incumbent) | 1,004,987 | 47.83% | 0 |
| Independent | Eugene McCarthy | 34,943 | 1.66% | 0 |
| American | Lester Maddox | 8,552 | 0.41% | 0 |
| Independent | Frank Zeidler | 4,298 | 0.20% | 0 |
| Independent | Roger L. MacBride | 3,814 | 0.18% | 0 |
| Independent | Peter Camejo | 1,691 | 0.08% | 0 |
| Independent | Margaret Wright | 943 | 0.04% | 0 |
| Independent | Gus Hall | 749 | 0.04% | 0 |
| Independent | Lyndon H. LaRouche | 738 | 0.04% | 0 |
| Independent | Julius Levin | 389 | 0.02% | 0 |
| Totals | | 2,101,336 | 100.0% | 11 |

=== Results by county ===
| County | Jimmy Carter Democratic | | Gerald Ford Republican | | Eugene McCarthy Independent | | Lester Maddox American | | Other candidates Various parties | | Margin | | Total votes cast |
| County | # | % | # | % | # | % | # | % | # | % | # | % | Total votes cast |
|---|---|---|---|---|---|---|---|---|---|---|---|---|---|
| Adams | 3,089 | 55.28% | 2,377 | 42.54% | 77 | 1.38% | 22 | 0.39% | 23 | 0.41% | 712 | 12.74% | 5,588 |
| Ashland | 4,688 | 58.89% | 3,045 | 38.25% | 131 | 1.65% | 43 | 0.54% | 54 | 0.68% | 1,643 | 20.64% | 7,961 |
| Barron | 8,678 | 52.97% | 7,393 | 45.13% | 205 | 1.25% | 62 | 0.38% | 44 | 0.27% | 1,285 | 7.84% | 16,382 |
| Bayfield | 3,885 | 58.05% | 2,624 | 39.21% | 136 | 2.03% | 18 | 0.27% | 30 | 0.45% | 1,261 | 18.84% | 6,693 |
| Brown | 33,572 | 46.47% | 36,571 | 50.62% | 1,480 | 2.05% | 344 | 0.48% | 276 | 0.38% | -2,999 | -4.15% | 72,243 |
| Buffalo | 3,448 | 53.65% | 2,844 | 44.25% | 83 | 1.29% | 33 | 0.51% | 19 | 0.30% | 604 | 9.40% | 6,427 |
| Burnett | 3,720 | 57.74% | 2,573 | 39.93% | 89 | 1.38% | 31 | 0.48% | 30 | 0.47% | 1,147 | 17.81% | 6,443 |
| Calumet | 6,241 | 47.53% | 6,589 | 50.18% | 221 | 1.68% | 42 | 0.32% | 39 | 0.30% | -348 | -2.65% | 13,132 |
| Chippewa | 11,538 | 57.42% | 8,137 | 40.50% | 270 | 1.34% | 93 | 0.46% | 55 | 0.27% | 3,401 | 16.92% | 20,093 |
| Clark | 7,238 | 52.67% | 6,095 | 44.35% | 204 | 1.48% | 172 | 1.25% | 33 | 0.24% | 1,143 | 8.32% | 13,742 |
| Columbia | 9,457 | 47.52% | 10,075 | 50.63% | 235 | 1.18% | 67 | 0.34% | 66 | 0.33% | -618 | -3.11% | 19,900 |
| Crawford | 3,629 | 50.39% | 3,393 | 47.11% | 128 | 1.78% | 32 | 0.44% | 20 | 0.28% | 236 | 3.28% | 7,202 |
| Dane | 82,321 | 53.96% | 63,466 | 41.60% | 4,629 | 3.03% | 369 | 0.24% | 1,767 | 1.16% | 18,855 | 12.36% | 152,552 |
| Dodge | 13,643 | 43.12% | 17,335 | 54.79% | 464 | 1.47% | 104 | 0.33% | 95 | 0.30% | -3,692 | -11.67% | 31,641 |
| Door | 4,553 | 39.88% | 6,557 | 57.43% | 198 | 1.73% | 46 | 0.40% | 63 | 0.55% | -2,004 | -17.55% | 11,417 |
| Douglas | 13,478 | 64.32% | 6,999 | 33.40% | 326 | 1.56% | 24 | 0.11% | 129 | 0.62% | 6,479 | 30.92% | 20,956 |
| Dunn | 7,882 | 52.53% | 6,751 | 44.99% | 234 | 1.56% | 95 | 0.63% | 42 | 0.28% | 1,131 | 7.54% | 15,004 |
| Eau Claire | 18,263 | 51.66% | 16,388 | 46.36% | 491 | 1.39% | 73 | 0.21% | 138 | 0.39% | 1,875 | 5.30% | 35,353 |
| Florence | 965 | 50.23% | 922 | 48.00% | 28 | 1.46% | 2 | 0.10% | 4 | 0.21% | 43 | 2.23% | 1,921 |
| Fond du Lac | 16,571 | 41.59% | 22,226 | 55.79% | 676 | 1.70% | 224 | 0.56% | 144 | 0.36% | -5,655 | -14.20% | 39,841 |
| Forest | 2,574 | 60.72% | 1,604 | 37.84% | 43 | 1.01% | 12 | 0.28% | 6 | 0.14% | 970 | 22.88% | 4,239 |
| Grant | 9,639 | 43.41% | 12,016 | 54.11% | 416 | 1.87% | 57 | 0.26% | 79 | 0.36% | -2,377 | -10.70% | 22,207 |
| Green | 5,632 | 43.17% | 7,085 | 54.31% | 169 | 1.30% | 112 | 0.86% | 48 | 0.37% | -1,453 | -11.14% | 13,046 |
| Green Lake | 3,411 | 39.69% | 5,020 | 58.41% | 111 | 1.29% | 33 | 0.38% | 20 | 0.23% | -1,609 | -18.72% | 8,595 |
| Iowa | 4,252 | 49.00% | 4,195 | 48.34% | 139 | 1.60% | 62 | 0.71% | 30 | 0.35% | 57 | 0.66% | 8,678 |
| Iron | 2,399 | 63.13% | 1,340 | 35.26% | 43 | 1.13% | 4 | 0.11% | 14 | 0.37% | 1,059 | 27.87% | 3,800 |
| Jackson | 3,735 | 51.42% | 3,406 | 46.89% | 73 | 1.00% | 22 | 0.30% | 28 | 0.39% | 329 | 4.53% | 7,264 |
| Jefferson | 12,577 | 43.65% | 15,528 | 53.89% | 454 | 1.58% | 131 | 0.45% | 122 | 0.42% | -2,951 | -10.24% | 28,812 |
| Juneau | 4,512 | 49.71% | 4,242 | 46.73% | 96 | 1.06% | 201 | 2.21% | 26 | 0.29% | 270 | 2.98% | 9,077 |
| Kenosha | 27,585 | 53.82% | 22,349 | 43.61% | 832 | 1.62% | 248 | 0.48% | 236 | 0.46% | 5,236 | 10.21% | 51,250 |
| Kewaunee | 4,607 | 49.65% | 4,447 | 47.93% | 135 | 1.45% | 64 | 0.69% | 26 | 0.28% | 160 | 1.72% | 9,279 |
| La Crosse | 16,674 | 40.02% | 24,188 | 58.06% | 564 | 1.35% | 101 | 0.24% | 132 | 0.32% | -7,514 | -18.04% | 41,659 |
| Lafayette | 3,839 | 46.91% | 4,131 | 50.48% | 121 | 1.48% | 62 | 0.76% | 30 | 0.37% | -292 | -3.57% | 8,183 |
| Langlade | 4,134 | 46.29% | 4,630 | 51.85% | 122 | 1.37% | 25 | 0.28% | 19 | 0.21% | -496 | -5.56% | 8,930 |
| Lincoln | 5,800 | 49.48% | 5,672 | 48.38% | 176 | 1.50% | 42 | 0.36% | 33 | 0.28% | 128 | 1.10% | 11,723 |
| Manitowoc | 19,819 | 53.90% | 16,039 | 43.62% | 504 | 1.37% | 293 | 0.80% | 116 | 0.32% | 3,780 | 10.28% | 36,771 |
| Marathon | 24,934 | 51.94% | 21,898 | 45.62% | 811 | 1.69% | 218 | 0.45% | 140 | 0.29% | 3,036 | 6.32% | 48,001 |
| Marinette | 8,482 | 48.68% | 8,591 | 49.30% | 236 | 1.35% | 70 | 0.40% | 46 | 0.26% | -109 | -0.62% | 17,425 |
| Marquette | 2,516 | 48.30% | 2,607 | 50.05% | 50 | 0.96% | 19 | 0.36% | 17 | 0.33% | -91 | -1.75% | 5,209 |
| Menominee | 766 | 68.27% | 324 | 28.88% | 24 | 2.14% | 1 | 0.09% | 7 | 0.62% | 442 | 39.39% | 1,122 |
| Milwaukee | 249,739 | 54.75% | 192,008 | 42.09% | 7,508 | 1.65% | 1,760 | 0.39% | 5,145 | 1.13% | 57,731 | 12.66% | 456,160 |
| Monroe | 6,465 | 46.28% | 7,242 | 51.85% | 177 | 1.27% | 38 | 0.27% | 46 | 0.33% | -777 | -5.57% | 13,968 |
| Oconto | 6,541 | 50.21% | 6,232 | 47.84% | 140 | 1.07% | 75 | 0.58% | 39 | 0.30% | 309 | 2.37% | 13,027 |
| Oneida | 7,216 | 48.31% | 7,347 | 49.19% | 285 | 1.91% | 40 | 0.27% | 48 | 0.32% | -131 | -0.88% | 14,936 |
| Outagamie | 23,079 | 43.95% | 28,363 | 54.02% | 770 | 1.47% | 155 | 0.30% | 140 | 0.27% | -5,284 | -10.07% | 52,507 |
| Ozaukee | 11,271 | 35.36% | 19,817 | 62.17% | 488 | 1.53% | 133 | 0.42% | 168 | 0.53% | -8,546 | -26.81% | 31,877 |
| Pepin | 1,955 | 58.64% | 1,312 | 39.35% | 44 | 1.32% | 19 | 0.57% | 4 | 0.12% | 643 | 19.29% | 3,334 |
| Pierce | 8,039 | 57.16% | 5,676 | 40.36% | 267 | 1.90% | 41 | 0.29% | 41 | 0.29% | 2,363 | 16.80% | 14,064 |
| Polk | 8,485 | 56.85% | 6,159 | 41.27% | 222 | 1.49% | 23 | 0.15% | 35 | 0.23% | 2,326 | 15.58% | 14,924 |
| Portage | 15,912 | 60.65% | 9,520 | 36.28% | 607 | 2.31% | 43 | 0.16% | 155 | 0.59% | 6,392 | 24.37% | 26,237 |
| Price | 4,028 | 54.44% | 3,204 | 43.30% | 103 | 1.39% | 20 | 0.27% | 44 | 0.59% | 824 | 11.14% | 7,399 |
| Racine | 36,740 | 48.54% | 37,088 | 49.00% | 1,222 | 1.61% | 328 | 0.43% | 308 | 0.41% | -348 | -0.46% | 75,686 |
| Richland | 3,634 | 44.05% | 4,466 | 54.14% | 96 | 1.16% | 32 | 0.39% | 21 | 0.25% | -832 | -10.09% | 8,249 |
| Rock | 28,048 | 48.56% | 28,325 | 49.04% | 933 | 1.62% | 246 | 0.43% | 210 | 0.36% | -277 | -0.48% | 57,762 |
| Rusk | 4,050 | 58.21% | 2,724 | 39.15% | 110 | 1.58% | 32 | 0.46% | 41 | 0.59% | 1,326 | 19.06% | 6,957 |
| Sauk | 9,204 | 47.88% | 9,577 | 49.82% | 305 | 1.59% | 92 | 0.48% | 45 | 0.23% | -373 | -1.94% | 19,223 |
| Sawyer | 3,055 | 50.04% | 2,720 | 44.55% | 261 | 4.28% | 18 | 0.29% | 51 | 0.84% | 335 | 5.49% | 6,105 |
| Shawano | 6,751 | 43.63% | 8,505 | 54.97% | 91 | 0.59% | 100 | 0.65% | 25 | 0.16% | -1,754 | -11.34% | 15,472 |
| Sheboygan | 24,226 | 51.65% | 22,332 | 47.62% | 168 | 0.36% | 110 | 0.23% | 65 | 0.14% | 1,894 | 4.03% | 46,901 |
| St. Croix | 10,601 | 55.74% | 7,685 | 40.41% | 557 | 2.93% | 37 | 0.19% | 137 | 0.72% | 2,916 | 15.33% | 19,017 |
| Taylor | 4,101 | 51.90% | 3,591 | 45.45% | 136 | 1.72% | 39 | 0.49% | 34 | 0.43% | 510 | 6.45% | 7,901 |
| Trempealeau | 6,218 | 53.05% | 5,341 | 45.56% | 117 | 1.00% | 25 | 0.21% | 21 | 0.18% | 877 | 7.49% | 11,722 |
| Vernon | 5,534 | 46.54% | 6,132 | 51.56% | 156 | 1.31% | 60 | 0.50% | 10 | 0.08% | -598 | -5.02% | 11,892 |
| Vilas | 3,209 | 38.61% | 4,929 | 59.30% | 108 | 1.30% | 36 | 0.43% | 30 | 0.36% | -1,720 | -20.69% | 8,312 |
| Walworth | 12,418 | 39.67% | 18,091 | 57.79% | 540 | 1.72% | 125 | 0.40% | 133 | 0.42% | -5,673 | -18.12% | 31,307 |
| Washburn | 3,503 | 54.30% | 2,787 | 43.20% | 114 | 1.77% | 28 | 0.43% | 19 | 0.29% | 716 | 11.10% | 6,451 |
| Washington | 14,422 | 42.33% | 18,798 | 55.17% | 509 | 1.49% | 168 | 0.49% | 173 | 0.51% | -4,376 | -12.84% | 34,070 |
| Waukesha | 47,487 | 39.26% | 70,418 | 58.22% | 1,815 | 1.50% | 528 | 0.44% | 705 | 0.58% | -22,931 | -18.96% | 120,953 |
| Waupaca | 6,857 | 38.00% | 10,849 | 60.13% | 202 | 1.12% | 68 | 0.38% | 67 | 0.37% | -3,992 | -22.13% | 18,043 |
| Waushara | 3,485 | 43.04% | 4,449 | 54.94% | 96 | 1.19% | 30 | 0.37% | 38 | 0.47% | -964 | -11.90% | 8,098 |
| Winnebago | 24,485 | 42.16% | 32,149 | 55.35% | 954 | 1.64% | 221 | 0.38% | 273 | 0.47% | -7,664 | -13.19% | 58,082 |
| Wood | 14,728 | 47.58% | 15,479 | 50.00% | 438 | 1.41% | 209 | 0.68% | 103 | 0.33% | -751 | -2.42% | 30,957 |
| Totals | 1,040,232 | 49.50% | 1,004,987 | 47.83% | 34,943 | 1.66% | 8,552 | 0.41% | 12,622 | 0.60% | 35,245 | 1.67% | 2,101,336 |

==== Counties that flipped from Republican to Democratic ====
- Adams
- Barron
- Bayfield
- Buffalo
- Chippewa
- Clark
- Crawford
- Florence
- Iron
- Jackson
- Kenosha
- Lincoln
- Manitowoc
- Marathon
- Juneau
- Kewaunee
- Oconto
- Pepin
- Price
- Rusk
- Sawyer
- Sheboygan
- Taylor
- Trempealeau
- Washburn
- Burnett
- Dunn
- Eau Claire
- Forest
- Iowa
- Pierce
- Polk
- St. Croix

=== By congressional district ===
Carter won 5 of the state's 9 congressional districts, with the remaining 4 going to Ford, who won 2 districts that elected Democrats.

| District | Carter | Ford | Representative |
|---|---|---|---|
| 1st | 49.7% | 50.3% | Les Aspin |
| 2nd | 52.6% | 47.4% | Robert Kastenmeier |
| 3rd | 50.5% | 49.5% | Al Baldus |
| 4th | 55% | 45% | Clement Zablocki |
| 5th | 63% | 37% | Henry S. Reuss |
| 6th | 48% | 52% | William A. Steiger |
| 7th | 55.9% | 44.1% | Dave Obey |
| 8th | 46.4% | 53.6% | Robert John Cornell |
| 9th | 39.9% | 60.1% | Bob Kasten |

== See also ==
- United States presidential elections in Wisconsin
