= 1992 United States presidential election in Wisconsin =

- November 3, 1992

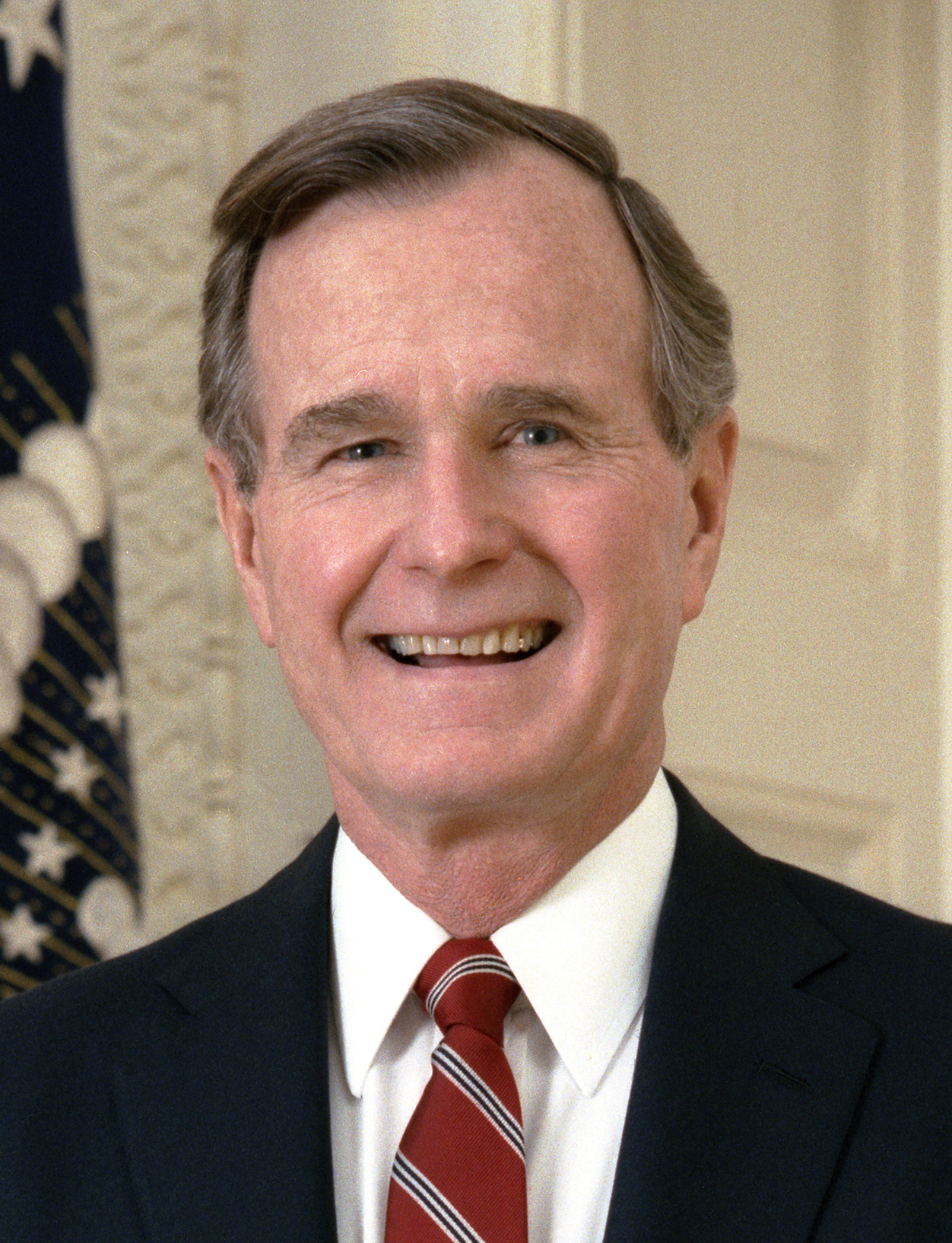

| Nominee | Bill Clinton | George H. W. Bush | Ross Perot |
| Party | Democratic | Republican | Independent |
| Home state | Arkansas | Texas | Texas |
| Running mate | Al Gore | Dan Quayle | James Stockdale |
| Electoral vote | 11 | 0 | 0 |
| Popular vote | 1,041,066 | 930,855 | 544,479 |
| Percentage | 41.13% | 36.78% | 21.51% |

Clinton
30–40%
40–50%
50–60%
60–70%
70–80%
80–90%
90–100%
Bush
30–40%
40–50%
50–60%
60–70%
70–80%
80–90%
90–100%
Perot
30–40%
40–50%
50–60%
Tie/No Data
President before election
George H. W. Bush
Republican
Elected President
Bill Clinton
Democratic

The 1992 United States presidential election in Wisconsin took place on November 3, 1992, as part of the 1992 United States presidential election. Voters chose 11 representatives, or electors, to the Electoral College, who voted for president and vice president.

Wisconsin was won by Governor Bill Clinton (D-Arkansas) with 41.13 percent of the popular vote over incumbent President George H. W. Bush (R-Texas) with 36.78 percent. Businessman Ross Perot (I-Texas) finished third, with 21.51 percent of the popular vote. Clinton ultimately won the national vote, defeating incumbent President Bush.

As of the 2024 presidential election, this is the last election in which Florence County voted for a Democratic presidential candidate, and the last time that Door County backed a losing candidate until 2024. Despite Clinton's decently solid victory in Wisconsin, it marks his narrowest one in a state that Michael Dukakis won in 1988.

== Results ==
1992 United States presidential election in Wisconsin
| Party | Candidate | Votes | Percentage | Electoral votes |
|---|---|---|---|---|
| Democratic | Bill Clinton | 1,041,066 | 41.13% | 11 |
| Republican | George H. W. Bush (incumbent) | 930,855 | 36.78% | 0 |
| Independent | Ross Perot | 544,479 | 21.51% | 0 |
| Libertarian | Andre Marrou | 2,877 | 0.11% | 0 |
| Independent | James "Bo" Gritz | 2,311 | 0.09% | 0 |
| Peace and Freedom | Ronald Daniels | 1,833 | 0.07% | 0 |
| Independent | Howard Phillips | 1,772 | 0.07% | 0 |
| Independent | J. Quinn Brisben | 1,211 | 0.05% | 0 |
| Natural Law | John Hagelin | 1,070 | 0.04% | 0 |
| Other write-ins | | 961 | 0.04% | 0 |
| Independent | Lenora Fulani | 654 | 0.03% | 0 |
| Independent | Lyndon LaRouche | 633 | 0.02% | 0 |
| Independent | Jack Herer | 547 | 0.02% | 0 |
| Third Party | Roland Hem (write-in) | 405 | 0.02% | 0 |
| Independent | James Warren | 390 | 0.02% | 0 |
| Totals | | 2,531,114 | 100.0% | 11 |

=== Results by county ===
| County | Bill Clinton Democratic | | George H. W. Bush Republican | | Ross Perot Independent | | Other candidates Various parties | | Margin | | Total votes cast |
| County | # | % | # | % | # | % | # | % | # | % | Total votes cast |
|---|---|---|---|---|---|---|---|---|---|---|---|
| Adams | 3,539 | 43.97% | 2,465 | 30.63% | 2,003 | 24.89% | 41 | 0.51% | 1,074 | 13.34% | 8,048 |
| Ashland | 4,213 | 50.20% | 2,372 | 28.26% | 1,746 | 20.80% | 62 | 0.74% | 1,841 | 21.94% | 8,393 |
| Barron | 8,063 | 39.86% | 6,572 | 32.49% | 5,479 | 27.08% | 116 | 0.57% | 1,491 | 7.37% | 20,230 |
| Bayfield | 3,873 | 47.74% | 2,393 | 29.50% | 1,786 | 22.02% | 60 | 0.74% | 1,480 | 18.24% | 8,112 |
| Brown | 37,513 | 36.53% | 42,352 | 41.24% | 22,395 | 21.81% | 441 | 0.43% | -4,839 | -4.71% | 102,701 |
| Buffalo | 2,996 | 43.11% | 2,029 | 29.19% | 1,889 | 27.18% | 36 | 0.52% | 967 | 13.92% | 6,950 |
| Burnett | 3,172 | 42.66% | 2,340 | 31.47% | 1,855 | 24.95% | 69 | 0.93% | 832 | 11.19% | 7,436 |
| Calumet | 5,701 | 30.98% | 7,541 | 40.98% | 5,055 | 27.47% | 104 | 0.57% | -1,840 | -10.00% | 18,401 |
| Chippewa | 10,487 | 41.57% | 8,215 | 32.56% | 6,408 | 25.40% | 120 | 0.48% | 2,272 | 9.01% | 25,230 |
| Clark | 5,540 | 37.22% | 4,977 | 33.44% | 4,284 | 28.78% | 84 | 0.56% | 563 | 3.78% | 14,885 |
| Columbia | 9,348 | 38.98% | 9,099 | 37.94% | 5,439 | 22.68% | 98 | 0.41% | 249 | 1.04% | 23,984 |
| Crawford | 3,540 | 45.31% | 2,390 | 30.59% | 1,797 | 23.00% | 85 | 1.09% | 1,150 | 14.72% | 7,812 |
| Dane | 114,724 | 54.60% | 61,957 | 29.49% | 31,874 | 15.17% | 1,567 | 0.75% | 52,767 | 25.11% | 210,122 |
| Dodge | 11,438 | 32.03% | 14,971 | 41.93% | 9,136 | 25.58% | 164 | 0.46% | -3,533 | -9.90% | 35,709 |
| Door | 4,735 | 34.37% | 5,468 | 39.69% | 3,506 | 25.45% | 68 | 0.49% | -733 | -5.32% | 13,777 |
| Douglas | 12,319 | 55.36% | 5,679 | 25.52% | 4,150 | 18.65% | 105 | 0.47% | 6,640 | 29.84% | 22,253 |
| Dunn | 7,965 | 43.72% | 5,283 | 29.00% | 4,809 | 26.40% | 161 | 0.88% | 2,682 | 14.72% | 18,218 |
| Eau Claire | 21,221 | 45.08% | 15,915 | 33.81% | 9,783 | 20.78% | 157 | 0.33% | 5,306 | 11.27% | 47,076 |
| Florence | 978 | 36.96% | 942 | 35.60% | 719 | 27.17% | 7 | 0.26% | 36 | 1.36% | 2,646 |
| Fond du Lac | 13,757 | 30.91% | 19,785 | 44.45% | 10,660 | 23.95% | 304 | 0.68% | -6,028 | -13.54% | 44,506 |
| Forest | 1,904 | 43.59% | 1,393 | 31.89% | 1,062 | 24.31% | 9 | 0.21% | 511 | 11.70% | 4,368 |
| Grant | 8,914 | 38.49% | 7,678 | 33.16% | 6,405 | 27.66% | 160 | 0.69% | 1,236 | 5.33% | 23,157 |
| Green | 5,467 | 38.55% | 4,887 | 34.46% | 3,735 | 26.33% | 94 | 0.66% | 580 | 4.09% | 14,183 |
| Green Lake | 2,772 | 29.06% | 3,897 | 40.85% | 2,827 | 29.63% | 44 | 0.46% | 1,070 (Note: In this county where Perot ran second ahead of Clinton, margin given is Bush vote minus Perot vote and percentage margin Bush percentage minus Perot percentage.) | 11.22% | 9,540 |
| Iowa | 4,467 | 44.01% | 3,288 | 32.39% | 2,341 | 23.06% | 55 | 0.54% | 1,179 | 11.62% | 10,151 |
| Iron | 1,762 | 45.28% | 1,273 | 32.72% | 835 | 21.46% | 21 | 0.54% | 489 | 12.56% | 3,891 |
| Jackson | 3,681 | 43.73% | 2,644 | 31.41% | 2,040 | 24.23% | 53 | 0.63% | 1,037 | 12.32% | 8,418 |
| Jefferson | 11,593 | 35.34% | 13,072 | 39.85% | 7,960 | 24.27% | 177 | 0.54% | -1,479 | -4.51% | 32,802 |
| Juneau | 4,177 | 38.00% | 4,051 | 36.85% | 2,670 | 24.29% | 95 | 0.86% | 126 | 1.15% | 10,993 |
| Kenosha | 27,341 | 44.21% | 19,854 | 32.11% | 14,232 | 23.02% | 410 | 0.66% | 7,487 | 12.10% | 61,837 |
| Kewaunee | 4,050 | 39.03% | 3,570 | 34.40% | 2,700 | 26.02% | 57 | 0.55% | 480 | 4.63% | 10,377 |
| La Crosse | 22,838 | 43.69% | 18,891 | 36.14% | 10,224 | 19.56% | 320 | 0.61% | 3,947 | 7.55% | 52,273 |
| Lafayette | 3,143 | 39.99% | 2,582 | 32.85% | 2,079 | 26.45% | 55 | 0.70% | 561 | 7.14% | 7,859 |
| Langlade | 3,630 | 36.15% | 3,890 | 38.74% | 2,444 | 24.34% | 78 | 0.78% | -260 | -2.59% | 10,042 |
| Lincoln | 5,297 | 39.82% | 4,321 | 32.48% | 3,605 | 27.10% | 81 | 0.61% | 976 | 7.34% | 13,304 |
| Manitowoc | 15,903 | 38.54% | 14,008 | 33.94% | 11,179 | 27.09% | 178 | 0.43% | 1,895 | 4.60% | 41,268 |
| Marathon | 21,482 | 37.44% | 20,948 | 36.51% | 14,600 | 25.45% | 348 | 0.61% | 534 | 0.93% | 57,378 |
| Marinette | 7,626 | 36.15% | 7,984 | 37.85% | 5,412 | 25.66% | 71 | 0.34% | -358 | -1.70% | 21,093 |
| Marquette | 2,533 | 37.69% | 2,322 | 34.55% | 1,818 | 27.05% | 47 | 0.70% | 211 | 3.14% | 6,720 |
| Menominee | 691 | 59.57% | 244 | 21.03% | 221 | 19.05% | 4 | 0.34% | 447 | 38.54% | 1,160 |
| Milwaukee | 235,521 | 50.60% | 151,314 | 32.51% | 76,039 | 16.34% | 2,622 | 0.56% | 84,207 | 18.09% | 465,496 |
| Monroe | 6,427 | 38.24% | 6,118 | 36.41% | 4,183 | 24.89% | 77 | 0.46% | 309 | 1.83% | 16,805 |
| Oconto | 5,898 | 36.70% | 5,720 | 35.59% | 4,405 | 27.41% | 50 | 0.31% | 178 | 1.11% | 16,073 |
| Oneida | 7,160 | 38.26% | 6,725 | 35.94% | 4,782 | 25.55% | 47 | 0.25% | 435 | 2.32% | 18,714 |
| Outagamie | 23,735 | 32.55% | 30,370 | 41.65% | 18,479 | 25.34% | 327 | 0.45% | -6,635 | -9.10% | 72,911 |
| Ozaukee | 11,879 | 27.68% | 22,805 | 53.15% | 8,002 | 18.65% | 224 | 0.52% | -10,926 | -25.47% | 42,910 |
| Pepin | 1,673 | 46.84% | 1,098 | 30.74% | 781 | 21.86% | 20 | 0.56% | 575 | 16.10% | 3,572 |
| Pierce | 7,824 | 45.30% | 4,844 | 28.05% | 4,492 | 26.01% | 112 | 0.65% | 2,980 | 17.25% | 17,272 |
| Polk | 7,746 | 42.86% | 5,446 | 30.14% | 4,753 | 26.30% | 126 | 0.70% | 2,300 | 12.72% | 18,071 |
| Portage | 15,553 | 46.13% | 10,914 | 32.37% | 7,083 | 21.01% | 166 | 0.49% | 4,639 | 13.76% | 33,716 |
| Price | 3,575 | 41.81% | 2,654 | 31.04% | 2,286 | 26.74% | 35 | 0.41% | 921 | 10.77% | 8,550 |
| Racine | 34,875 | 39.71% | 32,310 | 36.79% | 20,227 | 23.03% | 407 | 0.46% | 2,565 | 2.92% | 87,819 |
| Richland | 3,458 | 40.49% | 3,144 | 36.81% | 1,899 | 22.24% | 39 | 0.46% | 314 | 3.68% | 8,540 |
| Rock | 31,154 | 45.13% | 21,942 | 31.79% | 15,700 | 22.75% | 229 | 0.33% | 9,212 | 13.34% | 69,025 |
| Rusk | 3,376 | 42.37% | 2,430 | 30.50% | 2,085 | 26.17% | 76 | 0.95% | 946 | 11.87% | 7,967 |
| Sauk | 9,128 | 38.97% | 8,886 | 37.94% | 5,280 | 22.54% | 128 | 0.55% | 242 | 1.03% | 23,422 |
| Sawyer | 2,796 | 37.96% | 2,658 | 36.09% | 1,861 | 25.27% | 50 | 0.68% | 138 | 1.87% | 7,365 |
| Shawano | 6,062 | 33.77% | 7,253 | 40.40% | 4,540 | 25.29% | 97 | 0.54% | -1,191 | -6.63% | 17,952 |
| Sheboygan | 20,568 | 37.70% | 22,526 | 41.29% | 11,295 | 20.70% | 170 | 0.31% | -1,958 | -3.59% | 54,559 |
| St. Croix | 10,281 | 40.04% | 8,114 | 31.60% | 7,125 | 27.75% | 156 | 0.61% | 2,167 | 8.44% | 25,676 |
| Taylor | 3,305 | 35.31% | 3,415 | 36.49% | 2,590 | 27.67% | 49 | 0.52% | -110 | -1.18% | 9,359 |
| Trempealeau | 6,218 | 47.79% | 3,577 | 27.49% | 3,160 | 24.29% | 57 | 0.44% | 2,641 | 20.30% | 13,012 |
| Vernon | 5,673 | 44.61% | 4,072 | 32.02% | 2,890 | 22.73% | 81 | 0.64% | 1,601 | 12.59% | 12,716 |
| Vilas | 3,764 | 33.42% | 4,616 | 40.99% | 2,827 | 25.10% | 55 | 0.49% | -852 | -7.57% | 11,262 |
| Walworth | 11,825 | 32.14% | 15,727 | 42.74% | 9,029 | 24.54% | 215 | 0.58% | -3,902 | -10.60% | 36,796 |
| Washburn | 3,080 | 40.07% | 2,586 | 33.65% | 1,978 | 25.74% | 42 | 0.55% | 494 | 6.42% | 7,686 |
| Washington | 13,339 | 26.64% | 22,739 | 45.41% | 13,045 | 26.05% | 950 | 1.90% | -9,400 | -18.77% | 50,073 |
| Waukesha | 50,270 | 28.06% | 91,461 | 51.04% | 36,622 | 20.44% | 829 | 0.46% | -41,191 | -22.98% | 179,182 |
| Waupaca | 6,666 | 28.78% | 10,252 | 44.27% | 6,088 | 26.29% | 153 | 0.66% | -3,586 | -15.49% | 23,159 |
| Waushara | 3,402 | 32.94% | 4,045 | 39.16% | 2,829 | 27.39% | 53 | 0.51% | -643 | -6.22% | 10,329 |
| Winnebago | 27,234 | 35.19% | 33,709 | 43.56% | 16,140 | 20.86% | 303 | 0.39% | -6,475 | -8.37% | 77,386 |
| Wood | 13,208 | 36.25% | 13,843 | 37.99% | 8,822 | 24.21% | 563 | 1.55% | -635 | -1.74% | 36,436 |
| Totals | 1,041,066 | 41.13% | 930,855 | 36.78% | 544,479 | 21.51% | 14,714 | 0.58% | 110,211 | 4.35% | 2,531,114 |

==== Counties that flipped from Republican to Democratic ====
- Columbia
- Florence
- Grant
- Green
- Juneau
- Lafayette
- Marquette
- Monroe
- Oconto
- Oneida
- Richland
- Sauk
- Sawyer

== See also ==
- United States presidential elections in Wisconsin
