= 1984 United States presidential election in Wisconsin =

- November 6, 1984

Nominee	Ronald Reagan	Walter Mondale
Party	Republican	Democratic
Home state	California	Minnesota
Running mate	George H. W. Bush	Geraldine Ferraro
Electoral vote	11	0
Popular vote	1,198,800	995,847
Percentage	54.19%	45.02%
County results
Reagan
40–50%
50–60%
60–70%
70–80%
Mondale
50–60%
60–70%
President before election
Ronald Reagan
Republican
Elected President
Ronald Reagan
Republican

The 1984 United States presidential election in Wisconsin took place on November 6, 1984. All 50 states and the District of Columbia, were part of the 1984 United States presidential election. State voters chose 11 electors to the Electoral College, which selected the president and vice president of the United States. Wisconsin was won by incumbent United States President Ronald Reagan of California, who was running against former Vice President Walter Mondale of Minnesota. Reagan ran for a second time with incumbent Vice President and former C.I.A. Director George H. W. Bush of Texas, and Mondale ran with Representative Geraldine Ferraro of New York, the first major party female candidate for the vice presidency. This would be the last time Wisconsin would vote for a Republican in a presidential election until Donald Trump won the state in 2016, and the last time Wisconsin would vote for a Republican with a majority of the vote.

Reagan carried a majority in most of Wisconsin's counties, whereas Mondale carried a majority in ten, mostly in the far northwest of the state, along the Lake Superior coast and across from Minnesota's Iron Range, along with Milwaukee County, Dane County, Kenosha County, and almost entirely Native American Menominee County. Two relatively geographically isolated rural counties--Pepin County in west-central Wisconsin and Portage County in central Wisconsin—rounded out the list; these were Mondale's two weakest wins. One county, Polk County in the northwest, gave neither nominee a majority, but gave Reagan a plurality.

Reagan posted strong wins along the whole of eastern Wisconsin, apart from Manitowoc, Sheboygan, and Racine Counties, and the two Mondale wins in Milwaukee and Kenosha. He posted a particularly strong win in suburban Waukesha County, which he won by over thirty points. In western Wisconsin, Reagan won most of the counties but his margins tended to be weaker. As of the 2024 presidential election, this is the last election in which Eau Claire County, La Crosse County, Rock County, and Iowa County voted for a Republican presidential candidate, as well as the last election in which a Republican candidate won more than 40% of the vote in either Dane County or Milwaukee County, both of which have voted Democratic in increasingly large margins since. Adams, Buffalo, Crawford, Dunn, Jackson, Trempealeau, and Vernon counties would not vote Republican again until 2016, and Pierce County until 2012.

Reagan won the election in Wisconsin by a 9-point margin. While a sound victory, this made Wisconsin 9.1% more Democratic than the nation, signaling the consolidation of a new Democratic base in the Upper Midwest. Before 1976, Wisconsin had tended to lean Republican in close elections, voting narrowly for Nixon in 1960 and 1968. In 1976, it narrowly, but surprisingly, voted for Carter. Four years later, Wisconsin would become one of only ten states to back Michael Dukakis, the first time since 1848 it backed a losing Democrat, with it also being the first election since 1960 where it would back the overall losing candidate too.

Reagan was the last Republican candidate to win Wisconsin twice until Donald Trump did so in 2016 and 2024. He also remains the last Republican candidate to win the state in two consecutive elections.

== Results ==
1984 United States presidential election in Wisconsin
Party	Candidate	Votes	Percentage	Electoral votes
Republican	Ronald Reagan (incumbent)	1,198,800	54.19%	11
Democratic	Walter Mondale	995,847	45.02%	0
Libertarian	David Bergland	4,884	0.22%	0
Constitution	Bob Richards	3,864	0.17%	0
Independent	Lyndon LaRouche	3,791	0.17%	0
Independent	Sonia Johnson	1,456	0.07%	0
Independent	Dennis L. Serrette	1,007	0.05%	0
Write-Ins		706	0.03%	0
Independent	Larry Holmes	619	0.03%	0
Independent	Gus Hall	597	0.03%	0
Independent	Melvin Mason	445	0.02%	0
Totals		2,212,016	100.0%	11

=== By congressional district ===
Reagan won 6 of the 9 congressional districts.

District	Reagan	Mondale	Representative
1st	55.46%	44.54%	Les Aspin
2nd	49.14%	50.86%	Robert Kastenmeier
3rd	55.42%	44.58%	Steve Gunderson
4th	48.09%	51.91%	Jerry Kleczka
5th	39.51%	60.49%	Jim Moody
6th	62.42%	37.58%	Tom Petri
7th	52.56%	47.44%	Dave Obey
8th	63.46%	36.54%	Toby Roth
9th	65.27%	34.73%	Jim Sensenbrenner

=== Results by county ===
County	Ronald Reagan Republican		Walter Mondale Democratic		David Bergland Libertarian		Bob Richards Constitution		Lyndon LaRouche Independent		Other candidates Various parties		Margin		Total votes cast
County	#	%	#	%	#	%	#	%	#	%	#	%	#	%	Total votes cast
Adams	3,645	56.85%	2,715	42.34%	6	0.09%	11	0.17%	29	0.45%	6	0.09%	930	14.51%	6,412
Ashland	3,517	42.54%	4,680	56.60%	25	0.30%	13	0.16%	11	0.13%	22	0.27%	-1,163	-14.06%	8,268
Barron	9,587	53.94%	8,061	45.36%	27	0.15%	44	0.25%	38	0.21%	15	0.08%	1,526	8.58%	17,772
Bayfield	3,474	45.91%	4,034	53.31%	14	0.19%	13	0.17%	22	0.29%	10	0.13%	-560	-7.40%	7,567
Brown	51,202	62.44%	30,218	36.85%	212	0.26%	122	0.15%	132	0.16%	117	0.14%	20,984	25.59%	82,003
Buffalo	3,325	52.74%	2,921	46.34%	13	0.21%	17	0.27%	16	0.25%	12	0.19%	404	6.40%	6,304
Burnett	3,528	51.01%	3,331	48.16%	18	0.26%	16	0.23%	13	0.19%	10	0.14%	197	2.85%	6,916
Calumet	8,970	64.57%	4,736	34.09%	15	0.11%	83	0.60%	53	0.38%	35	0.25%	4,234	30.48%	13,892
Chippewa	10,986	51.45%	10,202	47.78%	46	0.22%	39	0.18%	60	0.28%	18	0.08%	784	3.67%	21,351
Clark	8,099	58.24%	5,647	40.61%	30	0.22%	36	0.26%	78	0.56%	16	0.12%	2,452	17.63%	13,906
Columbia	11,662	58.52%	8,125	40.77%	34	0.17%	52	0.26%	40	0.20%	14	0.07%	3,537	17.75%	19,927
Crawford	4,412	55.87%	3,436	43.51%	20	0.25%	4	0.05%	20	0.25%	5	0.06%	976	12.36%	7,897
Dane	74,823	43.84%	94,659	55.46%	537	0.31%	101	0.06%	145	0.08%	420	0.25%	-19,836	-11.62%	170,685
Dodge	20,458	64.41%	11,052	34.80%	56	0.18%	84	0.26%	82	0.26%	29	0.09%	9,406	29.61%	31,761
Door	8,264	67.35%	3,916	31.91%	38	0.31%	10	0.08%	21	0.17%	22	0.18%	4,348	35.44%	12,271
Douglas	7,066	32.92%	14,291	66.58%	26	0.12%	28	0.13%	25	0.12%	28	0.13%	-7,225	-33.66%	21,464
Dunn	8,473	51.80%	7,712	47.15%	63	0.39%	49	0.30%	25	0.15%	36	0.22%	761	4.65%	16,358
Eau Claire	20,401	51.09%	19,347	48.45%	65	0.16%	30	0.08%	51	0.13%	35	0.09%	1,054	2.64%	39,929
Florence	1,227	58.01%	870	41.13%	2	0.09%	4	0.19%	8	0.38%	4	0.19%	357	16.88%	2,115
Fond du Lac	26,069	64.61%	13,983	34.66%	74	0.18%	77	0.19%	78	0.19%	65	0.16%	12,086	29.95%	40,346
Forest	2,296	50.53%	2,214	48.72%	9	0.20%	6	0.13%	16	0.35%	3	0.07%	82	1.81%	4,544
Grant	13,430	62.58%	7,892	36.78%	41	0.19%	27	0.13%	47	0.22%	23	0.11%	5,538	25.80%	21,460
Green	7,827	63.65%	4,367	35.52%	28	0.23%	27	0.22%	34	0.28%	13	0.11%	3,460	28.13%	12,296
Green Lake	6,198	71.11%	2,441	28.01%	22	0.25%	15	0.17%	29	0.33%	11	0.13%	3,757	43.10%	8,716
Iowa	4,983	56.01%	3,843	43.19%	30	0.34%	9	0.10%	21	0.24%	11	0.12%	1,140	12.82%	8,897
Iron	1,667	45.63%	1,967	53.85%	7	0.19%	5	0.14%	4	0.11%	3	0.08%	-300	-8.22%	3,653
Jackson	4,386	55.81%	3,427	43.61%	7	0.09%	13	0.17%	17	0.22%	9	0.11%	959	12.20%	7,859
Jefferson	17,780	61.77%	10,788	37.48%	85	0.30%	49	0.17%	50	0.17%	32	0.11%	6,992	24.29%	28,784
Juneau	5,629	63.62%	3,152	35.62%	15	0.17%	18	0.20%	27	0.31%	7	0.08%	2,477	28.00%	8,848
Kenosha	26,118	46.89%	29,233	52.49%	118	0.21%	74	0.13%	87	0.16%	65	0.12%	-3,115	-5.60%	55,695
Kewaunee	5,705	61.94%	3,444	37.39%	11	0.12%	21	0.23%	21	0.23%	8	0.09%	2,261	24.55%	9,210
La Crosse	25,721	58.77%	17,787	40.64%	104	0.24%	51	0.12%	48	0.11%	58	0.13%	7,934	18.13%	43,769
Lafayette	4,584	60.43%	2,961	39.03%	15	0.20%	6	0.08%	14	0.18%	6	0.08%	1,623	21.40%	7,586
Langlade	5,830	60.91%	3,675	38.39%	26	0.27%	16	0.17%	17	0.18%	8	0.08%	2,155	22.52%	9,572
Lincoln	6,682	55.08%	5,353	44.12%	30	0.25%	22	0.18%	30	0.25%	15	0.12%	1,329	10.96%	12,132
Manitowoc	19,639	52.54%	17,250	46.15%	92	0.25%	221	0.59%	114	0.31%	60	0.16%	2,389	6.39%	37,376
Marathon	27,080	55.64%	20,128	41.36%	115	0.24%	74	0.15%	135	0.28%	1,138	2.34%	6,952	14.28%	48,670
Marinette	11,444	62.35%	6,798	37.04%	32	0.17%	29	0.16%	27	0.15%	23	0.13%	4,646	25.31%	18,353
Marquette	3,406	61.79%	2,032	36.87%	16	0.29%	39	0.71%	15	0.27%	4	0.07%	1,374	24.92%	5,512
Menominee	392	31.84%	832	67.59%	0	0.00%	0	0.00%	6	0.49%	1	0.08%	-440	-35.75%	1,231
Milwaukee	196,290	42.86%	259,144	56.58%	875	0.19%	590	0.13%	493	0.11%	625	0.14%	-62,854	-13.72%	458,017
Monroe	8,227	59.26%	5,567	40.10%	23	0.17%	17	0.12%	36	0.26%	14	0.10%	2,660	19.16%	13,884
Oconto	8,714	61.70%	5,289	37.45%	25	0.18%	41	0.29%	33	0.23%	22	0.16%	3,425	24.25%	14,124
Oneida	9,787	59.79%	6,417	39.20%	57	0.35%	44	0.27%	50	0.31%	14	0.09%	3,370	20.59%	16,369
Outagamie	36,773	64.54%	19,790	34.73%	108	0.19%	109	0.19%	99	0.17%	100	0.18%	16,983	29.81%	56,979
Ozaukee	23,898	68.48%	10,765	30.85%	80	0.23%	80	0.23%	49	0.14%	24	0.07%	13,133	37.63%	34,896
Pepin	1,555	48.56%	1,629	50.87%	8	0.25%	3	0.09%	4	0.12%	3	0.09%	-74	-2.31%	3,202
Pierce	7,612	50.74%	7,289	48.58%	17	0.11%	24	0.16%	33	0.22%	28	0.19%	323	2.16%	15,003
Polk	8,106	49.82%	8,034	49.38%	25	0.15%	45	0.28%	37	0.23%	22	0.14%	72	0.44%	16,269
Portage	13,605	48.28%	14,399	51.10%	58	0.21%	34	0.12%	41	0.15%	42	0.15%	-794	-2.82%	28,179
Price	4,289	54.62%	3,479	44.31%	21	0.27%	26	0.33%	29	0.37%	8	0.10%	810	10.31%	7,852
Racine	42,092	52.84%	36,955	46.39%	236	0.30%	180	0.23%	114	0.14%	86	0.11%	5,137	6.45%	79,663
Richland	4,858	62.66%	2,844	36.68%	23	0.30%	4	0.05%	11	0.14%	13	0.17%	2,014	25.98%	7,753
Rock	32,491	54.76%	26,433	44.55%	150	0.25%	78	0.13%	96	0.16%	86	0.14%	6,058	10.21%	59,334
Rusk	4,061	50.90%	3,843	48.16%	18	0.23%	24	0.30%	24	0.30%	9	0.11%	218	2.74%	7,979
Sauk	11,069	60.44%	7,158	39.09%	29	0.16%	17	0.09%	25	0.14%	15	0.08%	3,911	21.35%	18,313
Sawyer	3,913	56.14%	2,982	42.78%	17	0.24%	24	0.34%	23	0.33%	11	0.16%	931	13.36%	6,970
Shawano	10,635	65.55%	5,469	33.71%	24	0.15%	47	0.29%	35	0.22%	15	0.09%	5,166	31.84%	16,225
Sheboygan	26,345	55.05%	21,112	44.12%	112	0.23%	136	0.28%	77	0.16%	71	0.15%	5,233	10.93%	47,853
St. Croix	11,367	52.54%	10,127	46.81%	42	0.19%	26	0.12%	49	0.23%	24	0.11%	1,240	5.73%	21,635
Taylor	4,918	59.48%	3,271	39.56%	15	0.18%	15	0.18%	37	0.45%	13	0.16%	1,647	19.92%	8,269
Trempealeau	6,008	52.24%	5,407	47.02%	22	0.19%	25	0.22%	28	0.24%	10	0.09%	601	5.22%	11,500
Vernon	6,469	55.75%	5,051	43.53%	26	0.22%	12	0.10%	33	0.28%	12	0.10%	1,418	12.22%	11,603
Vilas	5,965	66.09%	2,940	32.57%	13	0.14%	17	0.19%	20	0.22%	71	0.79%	3,025	33.52%	9,026
Walworth	20,595	67.06%	9,877	32.16%	83	0.27%	54	0.18%	57	0.19%	44	0.14%	10,718	34.90%	30,710
Washburn	3,848	54.38%	3,188	45.05%	10	0.14%	13	0.18%	12	0.17%	5	0.07%	660	9.33%	7,076
Washington	25,279	65.54%	12,966	33.61%	94	0.24%	112	0.29%	84	0.22%	38	0.10%	12,313	31.93%	38,573
Waukesha	92,426	65.71%	47,313	33.64%	327	0.23%	268	0.19%	202	0.14%	124	0.09%	45,113	32.07%	140,660
Waupaca	13,097	68.33%	5,895	30.76%	31	0.16%	73	0.38%	48	0.25%	23	0.12%	7,202	37.57%	19,167
Waushara	5,769	66.79%	2,782	32.21%	24	0.28%	25	0.29%	30	0.35%	7	0.08%	2,987	34.58%	8,637
Winnebago	39,014	62.74%	22,791	36.65%	102	0.16%	100	0.16%	90	0.14%	86	0.14%	16,223	26.09%	62,183
Wood	20,525	62.42%	12,118	36.85%	65	0.20%	46	0.14%	86	0.26%	42	0.13%	8,407	25.57%	32,882
Totals	1,198,800	54.19%	995,847	45.02%	4,884	0.22%	3,864	0.17%	3,791	0.17%	4,830	0.22%	202,953	9.17%	2,212,016

==== Counties that flipped from Democratic to Republican ====
- Burnett
- Dunn
- Eau Claire
- Forest
- Iowa
- Pierce
- Polk
- St. Croix

== See also ==
- Presidency of Ronald Reagan
- United States presidential elections in Wisconsin
