= 2024 United States presidential election in Wisconsin =

- November 5, 2024
- Turnout: 72.95% (▲0.01 pp)

Nominee	Donald Trump	Kamala Harris
Party	Republican	Democratic
Home state	Florida	California
Running mate	JD Vance	Tim Walz
Electoral vote	10	0
Popular vote	1,697,626	1,668,229
Percentage	49.60%	48.74%

Trump
40–50%
50–60%
60–70%
70–80%
80–90%
90–100%
Harris
40–50%
50–60%
60–70%
70–80%
80–90%
90–100%
Tie/No Votes
President before election
Joe Biden
Democratic
Elected President
Donald Trump
Republican

The 2024 United States presidential election in Wisconsin took place on Tuesday, November 5, 2024, as part of the 2024 United States elections in which all 50 states plus the District of Columbia participated. Wisconsin voters chose electors to represent them in the Electoral College via a popular vote. The state of Wisconsin awarded ten electoral votes in the Electoral College.

Wisconsin was considered to be a crucial battleground in 2024, with almost all major news organizations marking the state as a tossup. The Wisconsin Green Party attained ballot access after not appearing in 2020. Trump won Wisconsin with 49.6% of the vote, the highest percentage a Republican candidate has received in Wisconsin since Reagan's 1984 landslide. When Wisconsin was called for Trump, a number of networks simultaneously declared Trump the president-elect, winning a second, non-consecutive term. Wisconsin also weighed in as 0.6% more Democratic than the nation at-large.

== Primary elections ==
=== Democratic primary ===
The Wisconsin Democratic primary was held on April 2, 2024, alongside contests in Connecticut, New York, and Rhode Island.

Wisconsin Democratic primary, April 2, 2024
Candidate	Votes	%	Delegates
Joe Biden (incumbent)	512,379	87.96	82
Dean Phillips (withdrawn)	17,730	3.04	0
Uninstructed Delegation	48,373	8.30	0
Write-in votes (as Scattering)	4,045	0.69	—
Total	582,527	100%	82

=== Republican primary ===
The Wisconsin Republican primary was held on April 2, 2024, alongside contests in Connecticut, New York, and Rhode Island.

Wisconsin Republican primary, April 2, 2024
Candidate	Votes	Percentage	Actual delegate count		
Candidate	Votes	Percentage	Bound	Unbound	Total
Donald Trump	477,103	78.97%	41	0	0
Nikki Haley (withdrawn)	76,841	12.72%	0	0	0
Ron DeSantis (withdrawn)	20,124	3.33%	0	0	0
Uninstructed	13,057	2.16%	0	0	0
Chris Christie (withdrawn)	9,771	1.62%	0	0	0
Vivek Ramaswamy (withdrawn)	5,200	0.86%	0	0	0
Write-ins	2,081	0.34%	0	0	0
Total:	604,177	100.00%	41	0	41

== General election ==
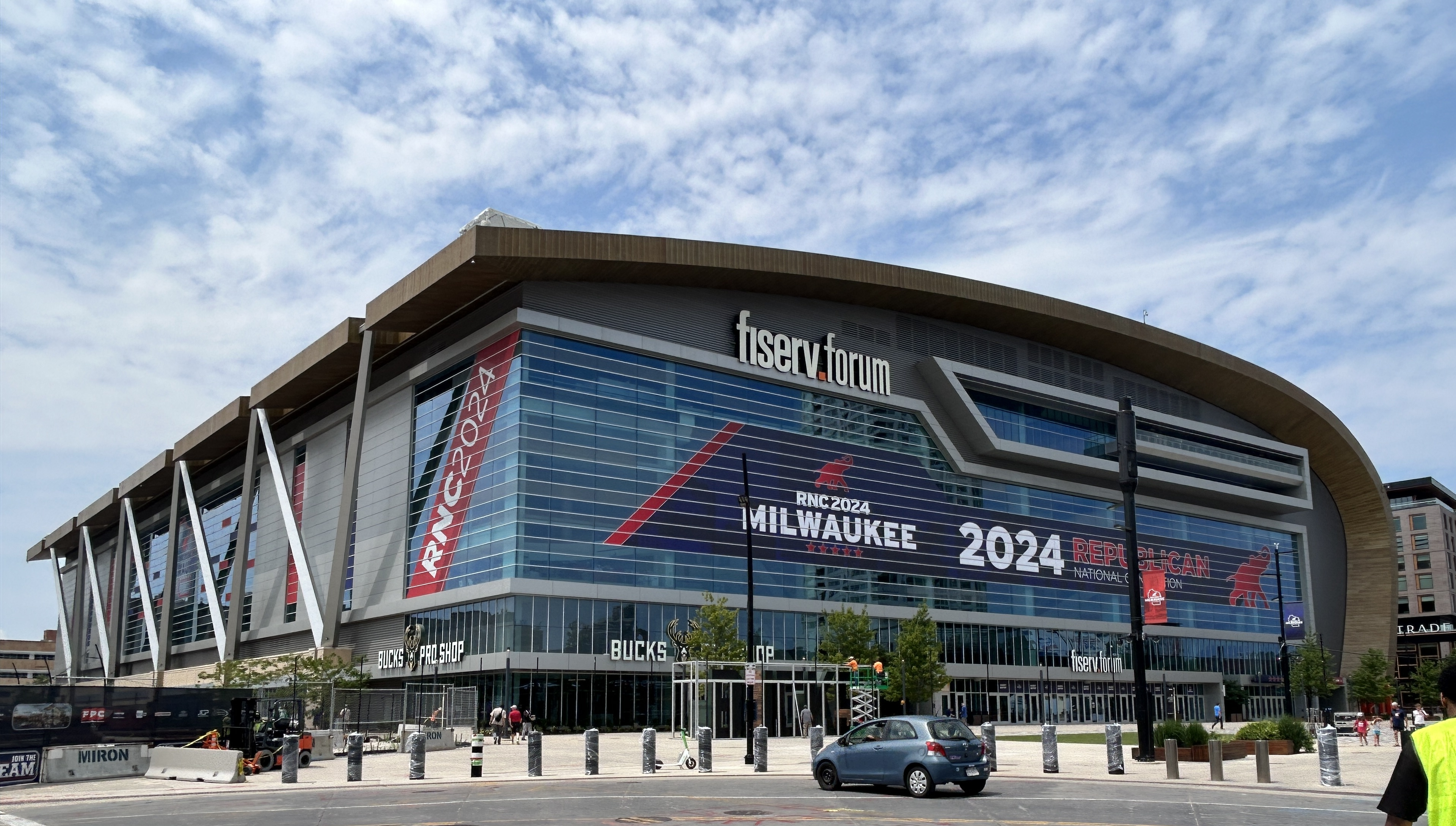
Fiserv Forum in Milwaukee decorated to host the 2024 Republican National Convention

=== Campaign ===
==== Convention ====
The Republican Party held their presidential nomination convention in the Wisconsin city of Milwaukee, where Donald Trump and JD Vance were formally nominated as the GOP ticket. This year marked the first time that Milwaukee hosted the Republican National Convention. The Democratic National Convention was selected for Milwaukee in 2020 but much of the convention activity was cancelled due to the COVID-19 pandemic.

=== Candidates ===
The following candidates have qualified for the general election ballot:

- Kamala Harris — Democratic
- Donald Trump — Republican
- Chase Oliver — Libertarian
- Randall Terry — Constitution
- Jill Stein — Green
- Robert F. Kennedy Jr. — Independent (Note: Candidate has suspended campaign, but will stay on the ballot.)
- Cornel West — Independent
- Claudia De la Cruz — Independent

=== Predictions ===
Source	Ranking	As of
The Cook Political Report	Tossup	November 4, 2024
Sabato's Crystal Ball	Lean D	November 4, 2024
Decision Desk HQ/The Hill	Tossup	November 4, 2024
CNN	Tossup	November 4, 2024
CNalysis	Lean D	November 4, 2024
The Economist	Tossup	November 4, 2024
538	Tossup	November 4, 2024
Inside Elections	Tossup	November 4, 2024
NBC News	Tossup	November 4, 2024

=== Polling ===
Kamala Harris vs. Donald Trump

Aggregate polls

Source of poll aggregation	Dates administered	Dates updated	Kamala Harris Democratic	Donald Trump Republican	Other / Undecided (Note: Calculated by taking the difference of 100% and all other candidates combined.)	Margin
270ToWin	October 23 – November 4, 2024	November 4, 2024	48.8%	47.7%	3.5%	Harris +1.1%
538	through November 4, 2024	November 4, 2024	48.3%	47.3%	4.4%	Harris +1.0%
Silver Bulletin	through November 4, 2024	November 4, 2024	48.7%	47.7%	3.6%	Harris +1.0%
The Hill/DDHQ	through November 4, 2024	November 4, 2024	48.4%	48.7%	2.9%	Trump +0.3%
Average			48.6%	47.9%	3.5%	Harris +0.7%

Poll source	Date(s) administered	Sample size (Note: Key: A – all adults RV – registered voters LV – likely voters V – unclear)	Margin of error	Kamala Harris Democratic	Donald Trump Republican	Other / Undecided
HarrisX	November 3–5, 2024	1,727 (RV)	± 2.4%	47%	46%	7%
HarrisX	November 3–5, 2024	1,727 (RV)	± 2.4%	51% (Note: With voters who lean towards a given candidate)	49%	–
HarrisX	November 3–5, 2024	1,549 (LV)	± 2.4%	49%	47%	4%
HarrisX	November 3–5, 2024	1,549 (LV)	± 2.4%	51%	49%	–
AtlasIntel	November 3–4, 2024	869 (LV)	± 3.0%	49%	50%	1%
Research Co.	November 2–3, 2024	450 (LV)	± 4.6%	49%	46%	5%
Trafalgar Group (R)	November 1–3, 2024	1,086 (LV)	± 2.9%	48%	47%	5% (Note: "Other" with 3%)
Patriot Polling	November 1–3, 2024	835 (RV)	± 3.0%	49%	49%	2%
InsiderAdvantage (R)	November 1–2, 2024	800 (LV)	± 3.4%	48%	49%	3% (Note: "Other" with 2%)
AtlasIntel	November 1–2, 2024	728 (LV)	± 4.0%	49%	50%	1%
Emerson College	October 30 – November 2, 2024	800 (LV)	± 3.4%	49%	49%	2% (Note: "Someone else" with 1%)
Emerson College	October 30 – November 2, 2024	800 (LV)	± 3.4%	50%	50%	–
Mainstreet Research/Florida Atlantic University	October 25 – November 2, 2024	798 (RV)	± 3.5%	49%	48%	3% (Note: "Another Candidate" with 1%)
Mainstreet Research/Florida Atlantic University	October 25 – November 2, 2024	786 (LV)	± 3.5%	49%	48%	3%
The New York Times/Siena College	October 25 – November 2, 2024	1,305 (RV)	± 3.5%	49%	47%	4%
The New York Times/Siena College	October 25 – November 2, 2024	1,305 (LV)	± 3.5%	49%	47%	4%
ActiVote	October 10 – November 1, 2024	400 (LV)	± 4.9%	51%	49%	–
AtlasIntel	October 30–31, 2024	673 (LV)	± 4.0%	49%	49%	2%
OnMessage Inc. (R)	October 29–31, 2024	800 (LV)	–	47%	48%	5%
YouGov (Note: Poll conducted for The Times, Stanford University, Arizona State University, and Yale University)	October 25–31, 2024	889 (RV)	± 4.5%	51%	47%	2%
YouGov	October 25–31, 2024	876 (LV)	± 4.5%	51%	47%	2%
Morning Consult	October 22−31, 2024	540 (LV)	± 4.0%	48%	49%	3%
TIPP Insights (Note: Poll sponsored by American Greatness)	October 28–30, 2024	1,038 (RV)	± 3.5%	48%	46%	6%
TIPP Insights	October 28–30, 2024	831 (LV)	± 3.5%	48%	48%	4%
Marist College	October 27–30, 2024	1,444 (RV)	± 3.3%	50%	48%	2% (Note: "Another Party's Candidate" with 1%)
Marist College	October 27–30, 2024	1,330 (LV)	± 3.4%	50%	48%	2%
Echelon Insights	October 27–30, 2024	600 (LV)	± 4.5%	49%	49%	2%
Quantus Insights (R) (Note: Poll sponsored by Trending Politics)	October 28–29, 2024	637 (LV)	± 3.8%	49%	49%	2%
SoCal Strategies (R) (Note: Poll sponsored by On Point Politics & Red Eagle Politics)	October 28–29, 2024	600 (LV)	± 4.0%	49%	49%	2%
Rasmussen Reports (R) (Note: Poll sponsored by American Thinker)	October 25–29, 2024	818 (LV)	± 3.0%	47%	50%	3%
AtlasIntel	October 25–29, 2024	1,470 (LV)	± 3.0%	49%	49%	2%
CNN/SSRS	October 23–28, 2024	736 (LV)	± 4.8%	51%	45%	4%
InsiderAdvantage (R)	October 26–27, 2024	800 (LV)	± 3.5%	48%	49%	3%
CES/YouGov	October 1–25, 2024	1,552 (A)	–	51%	46%	3%
CES/YouGov	October 1–25, 2024	1,542 (LV)	–	50%	47%	3%
Marquette University Law School	October 16–24, 2024	834 (RV)	± 4.4%	48%	46%	6%
Marquette University Law School	October 16–24, 2024	834 (RV)	± 4.4%	51%	49%	–
Marquette University Law School	October 16–24, 2024	753 (LV)	± 4.4%	48%	47%	5%
Marquette University Law School	October 16–24, 2024	753 (LV)	± 4.4%	50%	49%	1%
Emerson College (Note: Poll sponsored by RealClearWorld)	October 21–22, 2024	800 (LV)	± 3.4%	48%	49%	3%
Emerson College	October 21–22, 2024	800 (LV)	± 3.4%	49%	50%	1%
Quinnipiac University	October 17–21, 2024	1,108 (LV)	± 2.9%	48%	48%	4%
Trafalgar Group (R)	October 18−20, 2024	1,083 (LV)	± 2.9%	47%	47%	6%
Bloomberg/Morning Consult	October 16–20, 2024	635 (RV)	± 4.0%	48%	48%	4%
Bloomberg/Morning Consult	October 16–20, 2024	624 (LV)	± 4.0%	48%	48%	4%
The Bullfinch Group	October 11−18, 2024	600 (LV)	± 4.0%	50%	47%	3%
The Bullfinch Group	October 11−18, 2024	600 (LV)	± 4.0%	48%	46%	7% (Note: "A third party / Independent candidate" with 4%)
AtlasIntel	October 12–17, 2024	932 (LV)	± 3.0%	49%	48%	3%
RMG Research (Note: Poll sponsored by the Napolitan Institute)	October 10−16, 2024	787 (LV)	± 3.5%	48%	49%	3% (Note: "Some other candidate" with 2%)
RMG Research	October 10−16, 2024	787 (LV)	± 3.5%	49%	50%	1%
Morning Consult	October 6−15, 2024	527 (LV)	± 4.0%	47%	48%	5%
The Washington Post/Schar School	September 30 – October 15, 2024	695 (RV)	± 4.6%	50%	46%	4%
The Washington Post/Schar School	September 30 – October 15, 2024	695 (LV)	± 4.6%	50%	47%	3%
Patriot Polling	October 12–14, 2024	803 (RV)	± 3.0%	49%	50%	1%
Rasmussen Reports (R)	October 9–14, 2024	1,004 (LV)	± 3.0%	47%	49%	4%
InsiderAdvantage (R)	October 8–9, 2024	800 (LV)	± 3.7%	48%	48%	4%
Fabrizio, Lee & Associates (R)/McLaughlin & Associates (R) (Note: Poll sponsored by Trump's campaign)	October 6–9, 2024	800 (LV)	± 3.5%	48%	49%	3%
Emerson College	October 5–8, 2024	1,000 (LV)	± 3.0%	49%	49%	2%
Emerson College	October 5–8, 2024	1,000 (LV)	± 3.0%	49%	50%	1%
The Wall Street Journal	September 28 – October 8, 2024	600 (RV)	± 5.0%	48%	48%	4%
Research Co.	October 5–7, 2024	450 (LV)	± 4.6%	47%	45%	8% (Note: "Some other candidate" with 1%)
Research Co.	October 5–7, 2024	450 (LV)	± 4.6%	50%	48%	2%
Quinnipiac University	October 3–7, 2024	1,073 (LV)	± 3.0%	47%	49%	4%
Arc Insights (Note: Poll sponsored by Fields of Freedom Alliance)	October 2–6, 2024	700 (LV)	± 3.7%	47%	48%	5%
OnMessage Inc. (R) (Note: Poll conducted for the Article III Project)	September 24 – October 2, 2024	500 (LV)	± 4.4%	46%	47%	7%
Trafalgar Group (R)	September 28–30, 2024	1,079 (LV)	± 2.9%	46%	47%	7%
Global Strategy Group (D)/North Star Opinion Research (R) (Note: Poll sponsored by the Peter G. Peterson Foundation)	September 23–29, 2024	408 (LV)	± 4.9%	48%	46%	6%
ActiVote	August 29 – September 29, 2024	400 (LV)	± 4.9%	52%	48%	–
The New York Times/Siena College	September 21–26, 2024	680 (RV)	± 4.0%	49%	47%	4%
The New York Times/Siena College	September 21–26, 2024	680 (LV)	± 4.0%	49%	47%	4%
Marquette University Law School	September 18–26, 2024	882 (RV)	± 4.4%	50%	45%	5%
Marquette University Law School	September 18–26, 2024	882 (RV)	± 4.4%	52%	48%	–
Marquette University Law School	September 18–26, 2024	798 (LV)	± 4.4%	50%	45%	5%
Marquette University Law School	September 18–26, 2024	798 (LV)	± 4.4%	52%	48%	–
AtlasIntel	September 20–25, 2024	1,077 (LV)	± 3.0%	48%	50%	2%
Cook Political Report/BSG (R)/GS Strategy Group (D)	September 19–25, 2024	411 (LV)	–	49%	47%	4%
Bloomberg/Morning Consult	September 19–25, 2024	849 (RV)	± 3.0%	50%	48%	2%
Bloomberg/Morning Consult	September 19–25, 2024	785 (LV)	± 3.0%	51%	48%	1%
Rodriguez Gudelunas Strategies (Note: Poll sponsored by Focus on Rural America)	September 19–23, 2024	400 (LV)	–	51%	45%	4%
RMG Research	September 17–23, 2024	788 (LV)	± 3.5%	50%	49%	1%
Rasmussen Reports (R)	September 19−22, 2024	1,071 (LV)	± 3.0%	49%	49%	1%
Emerson College	September 15–18, 2024	1,000 (LV)	± 3.0%	48%	49%	3%
Emerson College	September 15–18, 2024	1,000 (LV)	± 3.0%	49%	50%	1%
MassINC Polling Group (Note: Poll sponsored by Wisconsin Watch)	September 12−18, 2024	800 (LV)	± 3.8%	53%	46%	1%
Morning Consult	September 9−18, 2024	600 (LV)	± 4.0%	50%	44%	6%
Marist College	September 12−17, 2024	1,312 (RV)	± 3.5%	50%	47%	3% (Note: "Another Party's Candidate" with 2%)
Marist College	September 12−17, 2024	1,194 (LV)	± 3.6%	50%	49%	1%
Quinnipiac University	September 12–16, 2024	1,075 (LV)	± 3.0%	49%	48%	3%
Fabrizio Ward (R)/Impact Research (D) (Note: Poll commissioned by AARP)	September 11–14, 2024	600 (LV)	± 4.0%	49%	48%	3%
InsiderAdvantage (R)	September 11–12, 2024	800 (LV)	± 3.5%	49%	47%	4% (Note: "Other" with 1%)
Morning Consult	August 30 – September 8, 2024	638 (LV)	± 4.0%	49%	46%	5%
co/efficient (R)	September 4–6, 2024	917 (LV)	± 3.2%	47%	47%	6%
CBS News/YouGov	September 3–6, 2024	946 (LV)	± 4.0%	51%	49%	–
Marquette University Law School	August 28 – September 5, 2024	822 (RV)	± 4.6%	49%	45%	6%
Marquette University Law School	August 28 – September 5, 2024	822 (RV)	± 4.6%	52%	48%	–
Marquette University Law School	August 28 – September 5, 2024	738 (LV)	± 4.7%	49%	44%	7%
Marquette University Law School	August 28 – September 5, 2024	738 (LV)	± 4.7%	52%	48%	–
Patriot Polling	September 1–3, 2024	826 (RV)	–	48%	48%	4%
Trafalgar Group (R)	August 28–30, 2024	1,083 (LV)	± 2.9%	46%	47%	7%
Emerson College	August 25–28, 2024	850 (LV)	± 3.3%	48%	49%	3%
Emerson College	August 25–28, 2024	850 (LV)	± 3.3%	49%	50%	1%
Bloomberg/Morning Consult	August 23–26, 2024	648 (LV)	± 4.0%	53%	44%	3%
Bloomberg/Morning Consult	August 23–26, 2024	701 (RV)	± 4.0%	52%	44%	4%
	August 23, 2024	Robert F. Kennedy Jr. suspends his presidential campaign and endorses Donald Trump.				
YouGov (Note: Poll conducted for the Cato Institute)	August 15–23, 2024	500 (A)	± 5.3%	48%	42%	10% (Note: "Will not vote" with 4%)
YouGov	August 15–23, 2024	– (LV)	± 5.9%	51%	46%	3%
	August 19–22, 2024	Democratic National Convention				
BK Strategies (Note: Poll sponsored by Platform Communications)	August 19–21, 2024	600 (LV)	–	48%	45%	7%
Fabrizio Ward (R) (Note: Poll conducted for the Pinpoint Policy Institute)	August 19–21, 2024	400 (LV)	± 4.9%	49%	45%	6%
Spry Strategies (R) (Note: Poll sponsored by the American Principles Project)	August 14–20, 2024	600 (LV)	± 4.0%	48%	45%	7%
Rasmussen Reports (R) (Note: Poll sponsored by NumbersUSA)	August 13–19, 2024	1,099 (LV)	± 3.0%	48%	47%	5%
Focaldata	August 6–16, 2024	700 (LV)	± 3.7%	52%	48%	–
Quantus Insights (R)	August 14–15, 2024	601 (RV)	± 4.0%	46%	45%	9%
TIPP Insights	August 12–14, 2024	1,015 (RV)	± 3.4%	47%	46%	7%
TIPP Insights	August 12–14, 2024	976 (LV)	± 3.4%	47%	47%	6%
The Bullfinch Group (Note: Poll conducted for The Independent Center)	August 8–11, 2024	500 (RV)	± 4.4%	51%	42%	7%
InsiderAdvantage (R)	August 6–8, 2024	800 (LV)	–	48%	49%	3%
Navigator Research (D)	July 31 – August 8, 2024	600 (LV)	± 4.0%	48%	48%	4%
Cook Political Report/BSG (R)/GS Strategy Group (D)	July 26 – August 8, 2024	404 (LV)	–	49%	46%	5%
The New York Times/Siena College	August 5–8, 2024	661 (RV)	± 4.3%	50%	46%	4%
The New York Times/Siena College	August 5–8, 2024	661 (LV)	± 4.3%	50%	46%	3%
	August 6, 2024	Kamala Harris selects Gov. Tim Walz as her running mate.				
RMG Research	July 31 – August 5, 2024	800 (RV)	± 3.5%	48%	45%	7%
Marquette University Law School	July 24 – August 1, 2024	877 (RV)	± 4.6%	47%	44%	9%
Marquette University Law School	July 24 – August 1, 2024	877 (RV)	± 4.6%	49%	50%	1%
Marquette University Law School	July 24 – August 1, 2024	801 (LV)	± 4.8%	49%	45%	6%
Marquette University Law School	July 24 – August 1, 2024	801 (LV)	± 4.8%	50%	49%	1%
Public Opinion Strategies (R) (Note: Poll conducted for Competitiveness Coalition)	July 23–29, 2024	400 (LV)	± 4.9%	48%	46%	6%
Bloomberg/Morning Consult	July 24–28, 2024	700 (RV)	± 4.0%	49%	47%	4%
Fox News	July 22–24, 2024	1,046 (RV)	± 3.0%	49%	50%	1%
Emerson College	July 22–23, 2024	845 (RV)	± 3.3%	47%	47%	6%
Emerson College	July 22–23, 2024	845 (RV)	± 3.3%	51%	49%	–
	July 21, 2024	Joe Biden announces his withdrawal from the race; Kamala Harris declares her candidacy for president.				
	July 15–19, 2024	Republican National Convention				
	July 13, 2024	Attempted assassination of Donald Trump				
Public Policy Polling (D) (Note: Poll conducted for Progress Action Fund, which supports Democratic candidates)	July 10–11, 2024	548 (RV)	–	48%	49%	3%
North Star Opinion Research (R)	July 6–10, 2024	600 (LV)	± 4.0%	47%	48%	5%
Bloomberg/Morning Consult	May 7–13, 2024	693 (RV)	± 4.0%	41%	49%	10%
Emerson College	February 20–24, 2024	1,000 (RV)	± 3.0%	44%	47%	9%
The New York Times/Siena College	October 22 – November 3, 2023	603 (RV)	± 4.8%	46%	47%	7%
The New York Times/Siena College	October 22 – November 3, 2023	603 (LV)	± 4.8%	46%	48%	6%

Kamala Harris vs. Donald Trump vs. Cornel West vs. Jill Stein vs. Chase Oliver

Poll source	Date(s) administered	Sample size	Margin of error	Kamala Harris Democratic	Donald Trump Republican	Cornel West Independent	Jill Stein Green	Chase Oliver Libertarian	Other / Undecided
HarrisX	November 3–5, 2024	1,727 (RV)	± 2.4%	45%	45%	2%	1%	–	7%
HarrisX	November 3–5, 2024	1,727 (RV)	± 2.4%	48.0%	47.9%	2.6%	1.4%	–	–
HarrisX	November 3–5, 2024	1,549 (LV)	± 2.4%	47%	47%	2%	1%	–	3%
HarrisX	November 3–5, 2024	1,549 (LV)	± 2.4%	48.1%	48.5%	2.1%	1.3%	–	–
AtlasIntel	November 3–4, 2024	869 (LV)	± 3.0%	48%	49%	–	1%	0%	1%
AtlasIntel	November 1–2, 2024	728 (LV)	± 4.0%	48%	49%	–	1%	0%	2%
The New York Times/Siena College	October 25 – November 2, 2024	1,305 (RV)	± 3.5%	48%	45%	0%	2%	0%	5%
The New York Times/Siena College	October 25 – November 2, 2024	1,305 (LV)	± 3.5%	48%	45%	0%	1%	0%	6%
Focaldata	October 3 – November 1, 2024	1,799 (LV)	–	50%	47%	–	0%	1%	2%
Focaldata	October 3 – November 1, 2024	1,613 (RV)	± 2.3%	51%	46%	–	1%	1%	1%
Focaldata	October 3 – November 1, 2024	1,799 (A)	–	49%	46%	–	1%	1%	3%
AtlasIntel	October 30–31, 2024	673 (LV)	± 4.0%	48%	49%	–	1%	0%	2%
Redfield & Wilton Strategies	October 28–31, 2024	932 (LV)	–	48%	47%	–	0%	1%	4%
YouGov	October 25–31, 2024	889 (RV)	± 4.5%	48%	45%	0%	3%	–	4%
YouGov	October 25–31, 2024	876 (LV)	± 4.5%	49%	45%	0%	2%	–	4%
AtlasIntel	October 25–29, 2024	1,470 (LV)	± 3.0%	48%	49%	–	1%	1%	1%
Redfield & Wilton Strategies	October 25–27, 2024	746 (LV)	–	49%	47%	–	0%	1%	3%
Redfield & Wilton Strategies	October 20–22, 2024	557 (LV)	–	49%	47%	–	0%	1%	3%
OnMessage Inc. (R) (Note: Poll sponsored by the Senate Opportunity Fund)	October 19–22, 2024	600 (LV)	± 4.0%	47%	48%	–	0%	1%	4%
Quinnipiac University	October 17–21, 2024	1,108 (LV)	± 2.9%	48%	48%	0%	0%	0%	4% (Note: Randall Terry (C) & Claudia De la Cruz (PSL) with 0% each)
Bloomberg/Morning Consult	October 16–20, 2024	635 (RV)	± 4.0%	47%	47%	–	1%	3%	2%
Bloomberg/Morning Consult	October 16–20, 2024	624 (LV)	± 4.0%	47%	47%	–	1%	3%	2%
Redfield & Wilton Strategies	October 16–18, 2024	622 (LV)	–	47%	46%	–	0%	1%	6%
Redfield & Wilton Strategies	October 12–14, 2024	641 (LV)	–	48%	47%	–	1%	1%	3%
Quinnipiac University	October 3–7, 2024	1,073 (LV)	± 3.0%	46%	48%	0%	1%	1%	4%
Redfield & Wilton Strategies	September 27 – October 2, 2024	533 (LV)	–	47%	46%	–	0%	1%	6%
The New York Times/Siena College	September 21–26, 2024	680 (RV)	± 4.0%	48%	45%	–	1%	2%	4%
The New York Times/Siena College	September 21–26, 2024	680 (LV)	± 4.0%	48%	46%	–	1%	2%	3%
Bloomberg/Morning Consult	September 19–25, 2024	849 (RV)	± 3.0%	49%	47%	–	1%	2%	1%
Bloomberg/Morning Consult	September 19–25, 2024	785 (LV)	± 3.0%	50%	47%	–	0%	1%	2%
Remington Research Group (R) (Note: Poll sponsored by American Fuel & Petrochemical Manufacturers, a group that supports Republican candidates)	September 16–20, 2024	800 (LV)	± 3.5%	48%	48%	1%	0%	–	3%
Redfield & Wilton Strategies	September 16–19, 2024	600 (LV)	–	47%	47%	–	0%	0%	6%
Quinnipiac University	September 12–16, 2024	1,075 (LV)	± 3.0%	48%	47%	0%	1%	1%	3%
Redfield & Wilton Strategies	September 6–9, 2024	626 (LV)	–	49%	46%	–	0%	1%	4%
YouGov	August 23 – September 3, 2024	900 (RV)	± 4.1%	47%	44%	1%	1%	–	7%
CNN/SSRS	August 23–29, 2024	976 (LV)	± 4.4%	50%	44%	0%	2%	2%	2%
Redfield & Wilton Strategies	August 25–28, 2024	672 (LV)	–	48%	44%	–	0%	0%	8%
Bloomberg/Morning Consult	August 23–26, 2024	648 (LV)	± 4.0%	52%	44%	–	1%	1%	2%
Bloomberg/Morning Consult	August 23–26, 2024	701 (RV)	± 4.0%	51%	44%	–	1%	1%	3%

Kamala Harris vs. Donald Trump vs. Robert F. Kennedy Jr. vs. Cornel West vs. Jill Stein vs. Chase Oliver

Aggregate polls

Source of poll aggregation	Dates administered	Dates updated	Kamala Harris Democratic	Donald Trump Republican	Robert F. Kennedy Jr. (Note: Kennedy suspended his campaign, but he remains on the ballot in Wisconsin.) Independent	Jill Stein Green	Cornel West Independent	Chase Oliver Libertarian	Others/ Undecided (Note: Calculated by taking the difference of 100% and all other candidates combined.)	Margin
Race to the WH	through October 7, 2024	October 13, 2024	47.7%	46.3%	1.5%	0.9%	0.2%	1.1%	2.3%	Harris +1.4%
270toWin	October 2 – 11, 2024	October 11, 2024	47.0%	45.7%	2.5%	0.3%	0.6%	0.8%	3.1%	Harris +1.3%
Average			47.4%	46.0%	2.0%	0.6%	0.4%	1.0%	2.6%	Harris +1.4%

Poll source	Date(s) administered	Sample size	Margin of error	Kamala Harris Democratic	Donald Trump Republican	Robert Kennedy Jr Independent	Cornel West Independent	Jill Stein Green	Chase Oliver Libertarian	Other / Undecided
TIPP Insights	October 28–30, 2024	1,038 (RV)	± 3.5%	46%	44%	3%	1%	1%	–	5%
TIPP Insights	October 28–30, 2024	831 (LV)	± 3.5%	48%	47%	3%	1%	1%	–	–
Echelon Insights	October 27–30, 2024	600 (LV)	± 4.5%	48%	48%	0%	0%	1%	0%	3%
CNN/SSRS	October 23–28, 2024	736 (LV)	± 4.8%	51%	45%	1%	0%	1%	0%	2%
Marquette University Law School	October 16–24, 2024	834 (RV)	± 4.4%	46%	43%	5%	1%	1%	2%	2%
Marquette University Law School	October 16–24, 2024	753 (LV)	± 4.4%	46%	44%	5%	1%	1%	2%	1%
USA Today/Suffolk University	October 20–23, 2024	500 (LV)	± 4.4%	47%	48%	1%	0%	1%	0%	3%
AtlasIntel	October 12–17, 2024	932 (LV)	± 3.0%	49%	48%	1%	–	0%	1%	1%
The Wall Street Journal	September 28 – October 8, 2024	600 (RV)	± 5.0%	46%	45%	3%	1%	0%	0%	5%
Global Strategy Group (D)/North Star Opinion Research (R)	September 23–29, 2024	408 (LV)	± 4.9%	46%	45%	2%	1%	0%	1%	5%
Marquette University Law School	September 18–26, 2024	882 (RV)	± 4.4%	48%	44%	3%	0%	1%	1%	3% (Note: Randall Terry (C) with 1%; Claudia De la Cruz (PSL) with 0%)
Marquette University Law School	September 18–26, 2024	798 (LV)	± 4.4%	49%	44%	3%	0%	1%	1%	2%
AtlasIntel	September 20–25, 2024	1,077 (LV)	± 3.0%	48%	50%	0%	0%	1%	1%	–
Cook Political Report/BSG (R)/GS Strategy Group (D)	September 19–25, 2024	411 (LV)	–	48%	46%	0%	1%	2%	–	3%
MassINC Polling Group	September 12−18, 2024	800 (LV)	± 3.8%	51%	45%	1%	0%	1%	0%	2%
Fabrizio Ward (R)/Impact Research (D)	September 11–14, 2024	600 (LV)	± 4.0%	48%	45%	2%	0%	1%	0%	4% (Note: Randall Terry (C) with 0%)
Marquette University Law School	August 28 – September 5, 2024	822 (RV)	± 4.6%	47%	43%	6%	1%	1%	1%	1%
Marquette University Law School	August 28 – September 5, 2024	738 (LV)	± 4.7%	48%	43%	6%	1%	1%	1%	1% (Note: Randall Terry (C) with 1%)
Z to A Research (D) (Note: Poll conducted for Rust Belt Rising, which supports Democratic candidates)	August 23–26, 2024	518 (LV)	–	47%	47%	2%	–	0%	1%	3%
YouGov	August 15–23, 2024	500 (A)	± 5.3%	45%	40%	4%	1%	1%	0%	9% (Note: "Will not vote" with 4%)
YouGov	August 15–23, 2024	– (LV)	± 5.9%	49%	45%	1%	1%	0%	0%	4%
Rasmussen Reports (R)	August 13–19, 2024	1,099 (LV)	± 3.0%	46%	46%	4%	1%	1%	0%	2%
Focaldata	August 6–16, 2024	700 (LV)	± 3.7%	50%	44%	4%	–	1%	0%	1%
Focaldata	August 6–16, 2024	700 (RV)	± 3.7%	50%	42%	5%	–	1%	0%	2%
Focaldata	August 6–16, 2024	700 (A)	± 3.7%	50%	43%	5%	–	1%	0%	1%
Redfield & Wilton Strategies	August 12–15, 2024	469 (LV)	–	48%	44%	3%	–	0%	0%	5%
The Bullfinch Group	August 8–11, 2024	500 (RV)	± 4.4%	49%	40%	3%	1%	1%	–	6%
The New York Times/Siena College	August 5–8, 2024	661 (RV)	± 4.3%	49%	42%	6%	0%	1%	1%	2%
The New York Times/Siena College	August 5–8, 2024	661 (LV)	± 4.3%	49%	43%	5%	0%	1%	1%	2%
Navigator Research (D)	July 31 – August 8, 2024	600 (LV)	± 4.0%	45%	45%	5%	1%	1%	1%	2%
Cook Political Report/BSG (R)/GS Strategy Group (D)	July 26 – August 8, 2024	404 (LV)	–	48%	43%	5%	1%	0%	–	3%
Redfield & Wilton Strategies	July 31 – August 3, 2024	597 (LV)	–	43%	43%	3%	–	0%	0%	11%
Marquette University Law School	July 24 – August 1, 2024	877 (RV)	± 4.6%	45%	43%	8%	0%	1%	1%	2%
Marquette University Law School	July 24 – August 1, 2024	801 (LV)	± 4.8%	46%	45%	6%	0%	1%	1%	1%
Bloomberg/Morning Consult	July 24–28, 2024	700 (RV)	± 4.0%	44%	45%	6%	–	0%	3%	2%
Redfield & Wilton Strategies	July 22–24, 2024	523 (LV)	–	44%	44%	5%	–	1%	1%	5%
Fox News	July 22–24, 2024	1,046 (RV)	± 3.0%	46%	46%	5%	1%	1%	–	1%

Kamala Harris vs. Donald Trump vs. Robert F. Kennedy Jr. vs. Jill Stein

Poll source	Date(s) administered	Sample size	Margin of error	Kamala Harris Democratic	Donald Trump Republican	Robert Kennedy Jr Independent	Jill Stein Green	Other / Undecided
Spry Strategies (R)	August 14–20, 2024	600 (LV)	± 4.0%	46%	42%	3%	2%	7%
Emerson College	July 22–23, 2024	845 (RV)	± 3.3%	45%	45%	3%	1%	6%

Kamala Harris vs. Donald Trump vs. Robert F. Kennedy Jr.

Poll source	Date(s) administered	Sample size	Margin of error	Kamala Harris Democratic	Donald Trump Republican	Robert Kennedy Jr Independent	Other / Undecided
Fabrizio Ward (R)	August 19–21, 2024	400 (LV)	± 4.9%	47%	42%	4%	7%
Civiqs	July 13–16, 2024	514 (RV)	± 4.8%	48%	48%	2%	2%

Hypothetical polling with Joe Biden and Donald Trump

Joe Biden vs. Donald Trump

Poll source	Date(s) administered	Sample size	Margin of error	Joe Biden Democratic	Donald Trump Republican	Other / Undecided
Marquette University Law School	July 24 – August 1, 2024	877 (RV)	± 4.6%	42%	47%	11%
Marquette University Law School	July 24 – August 1, 2024	801 (LV)	± 4.8%	44%	47%	9%
Emerson College (Note: Poll sponsored by Democrats for the Next Generation PAC)	July 15–16, 2024	1,000 (RV)	± 3.0%	43%	48%	9%
Public Policy Polling (D) (Note: Poll conducted for Protect Our Care)	July 11–12, 2024	653 (V)	± 3.8%	47%	46%	7%
Rasmussen Reports (R) (Note: Poll sponsored by The Heartland Institute)	July 5–12, 2024	1,020 (LV)	± 3.0%	46%	48%	6%
Public Policy Polling (D)	July 10–11, 2024	548 (RV)	–	47%	47%	6%
North Star Opinion Research (R)	July 6–10, 2024	600 (LV)	± 4.0%	44%	46%	10%
Echelon Insights (Note: Poll sponsored by NetChoice)	July 1–8, 2024	617 (LV)	± 4.7%	45%	47%	8%
Bloomberg/Morning Consult	July 1–5, 2024	695 (RV)	± 4.0%	47%	44%	9%
SoCal Strategies (R) (Note: Poll sponsored by On Point Politics)	June 30 – July 2, 2024	490 (RV)	± 4.4%	43%	44%	13%
Fabrizio Ward (R)/Impact Research (D)	June 28 – July 2, 2024	600 (LV)	± 4.0%	45%	50%	5%
Emerson College	June 30 – July 2, 2024	1,000 (RV)	± 3.0%	44%	47%	9%
Marquette University Law School	June 12–20, 2024	871 (RV)	± 4.6%	44%	44%	12%
Marquette University Law School	June 12–20, 2024	871 (RV)	± 4.6%	50%	50%	–
Marquette University Law School	June 12–20, 2024	784 (LV)	± 4.9%	47%	44%	9%
Marquette University Law School	June 12–20, 2024	784 (LV)	± 4.9%	51%	49%	–
Emerson College	June 13–18, 2024	1,000 (RV)	± 3.0%	44%	47%	9%
Emerson College	June 13–18, 2024	1,000 (RV)	± 3.0%	49%	51%	–
Mainstreet Research/Florida Atlantic University	May 30–31, 2024	338 (RV)	± 5.3%	40%	38%	22% (Note: "Another candidate" with 12%)
Mainstreet Research/Florida Atlantic University	May 30–31, 2024	290 (LV)	± 5.3%	40%	41%	19% (Note: "Another candidate" with 11%)
KAConsulting (R) (Note: Poll conducted for Vapor Technology Association)	May 15–19, 2024	600 (RV)	–	45%	45%	10%
Prime Group (Note: Poll sponsored by Citizens to Save Our Republic PAC, which opposes Trump and third party candidates)	May 9–16, 2024	488 (RV)	–	51%	49%	–
Bloomberg/Morning Consult	May 7–13, 2024	693 (RV)	± 4.0%	46%	47%	7%
Cook Political Report/BSG (R)/GS Strategy Group (D)	May 6–13, 2024	503 (LV)	± 4.4%	45%	45%	9%
The New York Times/Siena College	April 28 – May 9, 2024	614 (RV)	± 4.0%	47%	45%	8%
The New York Times/Siena College	April 28 – May 9, 2024	614 (LV)	± 4.0%	46%	47%	7%
Quinnipiac University	May 2–6, 2024	1,457 (RV)	± 2.6%	50%	44%	6%
Emerson College	April 25–29, 2024	1,000 (RV)	± 3.0%	45%	47%	8%
Emerson College	April 25–29, 2024	1,000 (RV)	± 3.0%	48%	52%	–
Kaplan Strategies	April 20–21, 2024	802 (RV)	± 3.5%	38%	48%	14%
John Zogby Strategies (Note: Poll conducted for Kennedy's campaign)	April 13–21, 2024	518 (LV)	–	46%	48%	6%
CBS News/YouGov	April 19–25, 2024	1,226 (LV)	± 3.2%	49%	50%	1%
Fox News	April 11–16, 2024	1,198 (RV)	± 3.0%	48%	48%	4%
Bloomberg/Morning Consult	April 8–15, 2024	702 (RV)	± 4.0%	44%	48%	8%
Marquette University Law School	April 3–10, 2024	814 (RV)	± 4.8%	44%	47%	9%
Marquette University Law School	April 3–10, 2024	814 (RV)	± 4.8%	49%	51%	–
Marquette University Law School	April 3–10, 2024	736 (LV)	± 5.0%	45%	48%	7%
Marquette University Law School	April 3–10, 2024	736 (LV)	± 5.0%	49%	51%	–
North Star Opinion Research (R) (Note: Poll sponsored by League of American Workers)	April 6–9, 2024	600 (LV)	± 4.0%	45%	45%	10%
The Wall Street Journal	March 17–24, 2024	600 (RV)	± 4.0%	46%	46%	8%
Echelon Insights (Note: Poll sponsored by The Heritage Foundation)	March 12–19, 2024	400 (LV)	± 5.5%	47%	46%	7%
Emerson College	March 14–18, 2024	1,000 (RV)	± 3.0%	43%	46%	11%
Emerson College	March 14–18, 2024	1,000 (RV)	± 3.0%	48%	52%	–
Bloomberg/Morning Consult	March 8–14, 2024	697 (RV)	± 4.0%	46%	45%	9%
Bloomberg/Morning Consult	February 12–20, 2024	702 (RV)	± 4.0%	42%	46%	12%
Emerson College	February 20–24, 2024	1,000 (RV)	± 3.0%	42%	45%	13%
Kaplan Strategies	February 23, 2024	941 (RV)	± 3.2%	39%	41%	20%
Marquette University Law School	January 24–31, 2024	930 (RV)	± 4.2%	44%	44%	12%
Marquette University Law School	January 24–31, 2024	930 (RV)	± 4.2%	49%	49%	2%
Marquette University Law School	January 24–31, 2024	808 (LV)	± 4.2%	44%	46%	10%
Marquette University Law School	January 24–31, 2024	808 (LV)	± 4.2%	49%	50%	1%
Fox News	January 26–30, 2024	1,172 (RV)	± 3.0%	47%	47%	6%
Focaldata	January 17–23, 2024	863 (A)	–	38%	43%	19% (Note: "Another candidate" with 13%)
Focaldata	January 17–23, 2024	– (LV)	–	42%	46%	12% (Note: "Another candidate" with 9%)
Focaldata	January 17–23, 2024	– (LV)	–	49%	51%	–
Bloomberg/Morning Consult	January 16–21, 2024	697 (RV)	± 4.0%	44%	49%	7%
Bloomberg/Morning Consult	November 27 – December 6, 2023	681 (RV)	± 4.0%	41%	45%	14%
J.L. Partners (Note: Poll sponsored by The Daily Mail)	November 27 – December 1, 2023	550 (LV)	± 4.2%	45%	41%	14%
Bloomberg/Morning Consult	October 30 – November 7, 2023	675 (RV)	± 4.0%	46%	47%	7%
Emerson College	October 30 - November 4, 2023	1,000 (RV)	± 3.1%	43%	44%	13%
Emerson College	October 30 - November 4, 2023	819 (LV)	± 3.1%	45%	45%	10%
The New York Times/Siena College	October 22 – November 3, 2023	603 (RV)	± 4.8%	47%	45%	8%
The New York Times/Siena College	October 22 – November 3, 2023	603 (LV)	± 4.8%	47%	45%	8%
Marquette University Law School	October 26 – November 2, 2023	908 (RV)	± 4.5%	45%	42%	13%
Marquette University Law School	October 26 – November 2, 2023	908 (RV)	± 4.5%	50%	48%	1%
Bloomberg/Morning Consult	October 5–10, 2023	700 (RV)	± 4.0%	44%	46%	10%
Emerson College	October 1–4, 2023	532 (RV)	± 4.2%	40%	42%	19%
Public Policy Polling (D) (Note: Poll commissioned by Save My Country Action Fund)	September 25–26, 2023	673 (RV)	± 3.8%	48%	44%	8%
Prime Group	June 14–28, 2023	500 (RV)	–	53%	47%	–
Prime Group	June 14–28, 2023	500 (RV)	–	37%	40%	23% (Note: No Labels candidate)
Marquette University Law School	June 8–13, 2023	913 (RV)	± 4.3%	48%	38%	14%
Marquette University Law School	June 8–13, 2023	913 (RV)	± 4.3%	52%	43%	4%
Public Opinion Strategies (R)	April 17–20, 2023	1,000 (LV)	± 3.0%	47%	43%	9%
Emerson College	October 27–29, 2022	1,000 (LV)	± 3.0%	44%	43%	13%
Emerson College	September 16–18, 2022	860 (LV)	± 3.3%	45%	44%	11%
Fabrizio, Lee & Associates (R)	November 11–16, 2021	600 (LV)	± 4.0%	42%	52%	6%
Marquette University Law School	October 26–31, 2021	805 (RV)	± 3.9%	45%	41%	14%

Joe Biden vs. Donald Trump vs. Robert F. Kennedy Jr. vs. Cornel West vs. Jill Stein

Poll source	Date(s) administered	Sample size	Margin of error	Joe Biden Democratic	Donald Trump Republican	Robert Kennedy Jr Independent	Cornel West Independent	Jill Stein Green	Other / Undecided
Redfield & Wilton Strategies	July 16–18, 2024	470 (LV)	–	42%	42%	6%	–	1%	9% (Note: Chase Oliver (L) with 0%)
Trafalgar Group (R)	July 15–17, 2024	1,087 (LV)	± 2.9%	43%	46%	3%	0%	1%	7%
Emerson College	July 15–16, 2024	1,000 (RV)	± 3.0%	43%	46%	4%	0%	1%	6% (Note: Chase Oliver (L) with 1%)
Rasmussen Reports (R)	July 5–12, 2024	1,020 (LV)	± 3.0%	42%	45%	7%	0%	1%	5%
YouGov	July 4–12, 2024	900 (RV)	± 4.1%	38%	43%	4%	1%	1%	13%
North Star Opinion Research (R)	July 6–10, 2024	600 (LV)	± 4.0%	36%	38%	11%	–	3%	12% (Note: Chase Oliver (L) with 2%; "Other" with 1%)
Echelon Insights	July 1–8, 2024	617 (LV)	± 4.7%	42%	43%	6%	1%	2%	6% (Note: Chase Oliver (L) with 2%)
Bloomberg/Morning Consult	July 1–5, 2024	695 (RV)	± 4.0%	41%	39%	10%	1%	1%	8%
Fabrizio Ward (R)/Impact Research (D)	June 28 – July 2, 2024	600 (LV)	± 4.0%	38%	44%	9%	–	3%	6%
Marquette University Law School	June 12–20, 2024	871 (RV)	± 4.6%	40%	43%	8%	4%	2%	3%
Marquette University Law School	June 12–20, 2024	784 (LV)	± 4.9%	42%	44%	7%	3%	2%	2%
Emerson College	June 13–18, 2024	1,000 (RV)	± 3.0%	42%	44%	6%	0%	1%	7%
J.L. Partners	June 5–10, 2024	500 (LV)	± 4.3%	44%	44%	5%	0%	0%	6%
KAConsulting (R)	May 15–19, 2024	600 (RV)	–	42%	42%	7%	1%	2%	6% (Note: Lars Mapstead (L) with 1%)
Prime Group	May 9–16, 2024	488 (RV)	–	44%	44%	7%	3%	2%	–
Bloomberg/Morning Consult	May 7–13, 2024	693 (RV)	± 4.0%	42%	43%	6%	1%	1%	7%
Cook Political Report/BSG (R)/GS Strategy Group (D)	May 6–13, 2024	503 (LV)	± 4.4%	41%	41%	9%	1%	1%	7%
The New York Times/Siena College	April 28 – May 9, 2024	614 (RV)	± 4.0%	38%	38%	9%	0%	1%	14% (Note: Lars Mapstead (L) with 0%)
The New York Times/Siena College	April 28 – May 9, 2024	614 (LV)	± 4.0%	39%	40%	8%	0%	0%	13%
Quinnipiac University	May 2–6, 2024	1,457 (RV)	± 2.6%	40%	39%	12%	1%	4%	4%
Emerson College	April 25–29, 2024	1,000 (RV)	± 3.0%	40%	45%	6%	1%	1%	7%
Fox News	April 11–16, 2024	1,198 (RV)	± 3.0%	43%	41%	9%	2%	2%	3%
Bloomberg/Morning Consult	April 8–15, 2024	702 (RV)	± 4.0%	41%	44%	8%	1%	1%	5%
Marquette University Law School	April 3–10, 2024	814 (RV)	± 4.8%	40%	41%	13%	3%	2%	1%
Marquette University Law School	April 3–10, 2024	736 (LV)	± 5.0%	41%	42%	12%	3%	1%	1%
North Star Opinion Research (R)	April 6–9, 2024	600 (LV)	± 4.0%	36%	37%	13%	2%	4%	9%
The Wall Street Journal	March 17–24, 2024	600 (RV)	± 4.0%	41%	38%	10%	1%	1%	9%
Emerson College	March 14–18, 2024	1,000 (RV)	± 3.0%	40%	43%	6%	1%	1%	10%
Bloomberg/Morning Consult	March 8–14, 2024	697 (RV)	± 4.0%	39%	41%	10%	1%	1%	8%
Bloomberg/Morning Consult	February 12–20, 2024	702 (RV)	± 4.0%	35%	41%	10%	1%	1%	12%
Emerson College	February 20–24, 2024	1,000 (RV)	± 3.0%	37%	41%	7%	1%	1%	13%
Marquette University Law School	January 24–31, 2024	930 (RV)	± 4.2%	37%	40%	16%	2%	4%	1%
Marquette University Law School	January 24–31, 2024	808 (LV)	± 4.2%	39%	41%	13%	2%	4%	1%
Fox News	January 26–30, 2024	1,172 (RV)	± 3.0%	39%	42%	7%	1%	2%	11%
Bloomberg/Morning Consult	January 16–21, 2024	697 (RV)	± 4.0%	35%	43%	10%	0%	2%	10%
Bloomberg/Morning Consult	November 27 – December 6, 2023	681 (RV)	± 4.0%	34%	40%	10%	1%	3%	13%
J.L. Partners	November 27 – December 1, 2023	550 (LV)	± 4.2%	42%	37%	7%	1%	1%	12% (Note: "Someone else" with 12%)

Joe Biden vs. Donald Trump vs. Robert F. Kennedy Jr.

Poll source	Date(s) administered	Sample size	Margin of error	Joe Biden Democratic	Donald Trump Republican	Robert Kennedy Jr Independent	Other / Undecided
Civiqs	July 13–16, 2024	514 (RV)	± 4.8%	47%	47%	3%	3%
P2 Insights (Note: Poll sponsored by Building America's Future, which supports Republican candidates)	June 11–20, 2024	650 (LV)	± 3.8%	42%	45%	4%	9%
Mainstreet Research/Florida Atlantic University	May 30–31, 2024	338 (RV)	± 5.3%	38%	31%	13%	18%
Mainstreet Research/Florida Atlantic University	May 30–31, 2024	290 (LV)	± 5.3%	40%	35%	12%	13%
P2 Insights	May 13−21, 2024	650 (LV)	± 3.8%	42%	44%	7%	7%
The New York Times/Siena College	October 22 – November 3, 2023	603 (RV)	± 4.8%	37%	35%	22%	6%
The New York Times/Siena College	October 22 – November 3, 2023	603 (LV)	± 4.8%	37%	35%	21%	7%

Joe Biden vs. Donald Trump vs. Robert F. Kennedy Jr. vs. Cornel West

Poll source	Date(s) administered	Sample size	Margin of error	Joe Biden Democratic	Donald Trump Republican	Robert Kennedy Jr Independent	Cornel West Independent	Other / Undecided
Bloomberg/Morning Consult	October 30 – November 7, 2023	675 (RV)	± 4.0%	36%	38%	13%	2%	11%

Joe Biden vs. Donald Trump vs. Jill Stein

Poll source	Date(s) administered	Sample size	Margin of error	Joe Biden Democratic	Donald Trump Republican	Jill Stein Green	Other / Undecided
CBS News/YouGov	April 19–25, 2024	1,226 (LV)	± 3.2%	44%	48%	8%	0%

Hypothetical polling with other candidates

Joe Biden vs. Robert F. Kennedy Jr.

Poll source	Date(s) administered	Sample size	Margin of error	Joe Biden Democratic	Robert F. Kennedy Jr. Independent	Other / Undecided
John Zogby Strategies	April 13–21, 2024	518 (LV)	–	42%	48%	10%

Robert F. Kennedy Jr. vs. Donald Trump

Poll source	Date(s) administered	Sample size	Margin of error	Robert F. Kennedy Jr. Independent	Donald Trump Republican	Other / Undecided
John Zogby Strategies	April 13–21, 2024	518 (LV)	–	41%	41%	18%

Gavin Newsom vs. Donald Trump

Poll source	Date(s) administered	Sample size	Margin of error	Gavin Newsom Democratic	Donald Trump Republican	Other / Undecided
Public Policy Polling (D)	July 10–11, 2024	548 (RV)	–	48%	48%	4%
Emerson College	February 20–24, 2024	1,000 (RV)	± 3.0%	36%	45%	19%

Gretchen Whitmer vs. Donald Trump

Poll source	Date(s) administered	Sample size	Margin of error	Gretchen Whitmer Democratic	Donald Trump Republican	Other / Undecided
Fox News	July 22–24, 2024	1,046 (RV)	± 3.0%	46%	50%	4%
Public Policy Polling (D)	July 10–11, 2024	548 (RV)	–	47%	46%	7%

JB Pritzker vs. Donald Trump

Poll source	Date(s) administered	Sample size	Margin of error	JB Pritzker Democratic	Donald Trump Republican	Other / Undecided
Public Policy Polling (D)	July 10–11, 2024	548 (RV)	–	47%	47%	6%

Josh Shapiro vs. Donald Trump

Poll source	Date(s) administered	Sample size	Margin of error	Josh Shapiro Democratic	Donald Trump Republican	Other / Undecided
Fox News	July 22–24, 2024	1,046 (RV)	± 3.0%	46%	49%	5%
Public Policy Polling (D)	July 10–11, 2024	548 (RV)	–	46%	44%	10%

Pete Buttigieg vs. Donald Trump

Poll source	Date(s) administered	Sample size	Margin of error	Pete Buttigieg Democratic	Donald Trump Republican	Other / Undecided
Public Policy Polling (D)	July 10–11, 2024	548 (RV)	–	47%	46%	7%

Joe Biden vs. Nikki Haley

Poll source	Date(s) administered	Sample size	Margin of error	Joe Biden Democratic	Nikki Haley Republican	Other / Undecided
Marquette University Law School	January 24–31, 2024	930 (RV)	± 4.2%	33%	45%	22%
Marquette University Law School	January 24–31, 2024	930 (RV)	± 4.2%	41%	57%	2%
Marquette University Law School	January 24–31, 2024	808 (LV)	± 4.2%	35%	46%	19%
Marquette University Law School	January 24–31, 2024	808 (LV)	± 4.2%	42%	57%	1%
The New York Times/Siena College	October 22 – November 3, 2023	603 (RV)	± 4.8%	39%	52%	9%
The New York Times/Siena College	October 22 – November 3, 2023	603 (LV)	± 4.8%	39%	53%	8%
Marquette University Law School	October 26 – November 2, 2023	908 (RV)	± 4.5%	36%	41%	23%
Marquette University Law School	October 26 – November 2, 2023	908 (RV)	± 4.5%	44%	53%	3%

Joe Biden vs. Ron DeSantis

Poll source	Date(s) administered	Sample size	Margin of error	Joe Biden Democratic	Ron DeSantis Republican	Other / Undecided
The New York Times/Siena College	October 22 – November 3, 2023	603 (RV)	± 4.8%	44%	48%	8%
The New York Times/Siena College	October 22 – November 3, 2023	603 (LV)	± 4.8%	44%	48%	8%
Marquette University Law School	October 26 – November 2, 2023	908 (RV)	± 4.5%	43%	42%	15%
Marquette University Law School	October 26 – November 2, 2023	908 (RV)	± 4.5%	48%	50%	1%
Marquette University Law School	June 8–13, 2023	913 (RV)	± 4.3%	45%	43%	12%
Marquette University Law School	June 8–13, 2023	913 (RV)	± 4.3%	49%	47%	4%
Public Opinion Strategies (R)	April 17–20, 2023	1,000 (LV)	± 3.0%	45%	45%	10%

=== Results ===
State Assembly district results: Trump 50–60% 60–70% 70–80% / Harris 50–60% 60–70% 70–80% 80–90%

2024 United States presidential election in Wisconsin
Party	Candidate	Votes	%	±%
Republican	Donald Trump; JD Vance	1,697,626	49.60%	+0.78
Democratic	Kamala Harris; Tim Walz	1,668,229	48.74%	−0.71
Independent	Robert F. Kennedy Jr. (withdrawn); Nicole Shanahan (withdrawn)	17,740	0.52%	N/A
Green	Jill Stein; Butch Ware	12,275	0.36%	+0.33
Libertarian	Chase Oliver; Mike ter Maat	10,511	0.31%	−0.86
Constitution	Randall Terry; Stephen Broden	4,044	0.12%	−0.04
Independent	Cornel West; Melina Abdullah	2,753	0.08%	N/A
Socialism and Liberation	Claudia De la Cruz (Note: Listed on the ballot without party affiliation.); Karina Garcia	2,035	0.06%	+0.06
Independent	Peter Sonski (Write-in (Note: Sonski and Onak were nominated by the American Solidarity Party, but registered as independent write-in candidates because the party was not recognized by the Wisconsin Secretary of State.)); Lauren Onak (Write-in)	561	0.02%	−0.14
Write-in		7,144	0.21%	+0.02
Total votes		3,422,918	100.00%	N/A

==== By county ====
County	Donald Trump Republican		Kamala Harris Democratic		Various candidates Other parties		Margin		Total
County	#	%	#	%	#	%	#	%	Total
Adams	7,763	60.26%	4,443	34.49%	676	5.25%	3,320	25.77%	12,882
Ashland	4,191	46.80%	4,612	51.50%	152	1.70%	-421	-4.70%	8,955
Barron	16,726	62.39%	8,941	33.35%	1,142	4.26%	7,785	29.04%	26,809
Bayfield	4,860	43.24%	6,107	54.33%	273	2.43%	-1,247	-11.09%	11,240
Brown	79,132	52.99%	67,937	45.49%	2,264	1.52%	11,195	7.50%	149,333
Buffalo	5,213	64.36%	2,765	34.14%	122	1.51%	2,448	30.22%	8,100
Burnett	7,008	64.83%	3,665	33.90%	137	1.27%	3,343	30.93%	10,810
Calumet	19,488	59.21%	12,927	39.27%	501	1.52%	6,561	19.93%	32,916
Chippewa	23,399	60.82%	14,573	37.88%	499	1.30%	8,826	22.94%	38,471
Clark	10,481	68.32%	4,509	29.39%	350	2.28%	5,972	38.93%	15,340
Columbia	17,988	51.52%	16,388	46.94%	538	1.54%	1,600	4.58%	34,914
Crawford	5,113	56.16%	3,860	42.39%	132	1.45%	1,253	13.76%	9,105
Dane	85,454	23.35%	273,995	74.88%	6,480	1.77%	-188,541	-51.52%	365,929
Dodge	33,067	65.74%	16,518	32.84%	715	1.42%	16,549	32.90%	50,300
Door	10,099	48.22%	10,565	50.44%	280	1.34%	-466	-2.22%	20,944
Douglas	11,732	46.49%	13,073	51.81%	429	1.70%	-1,341	-5.31%	25,234
Dunn	14,726	57.35%	10,643	41.45%	309	1.20%	4,083	15.90%	25,678
Eau Claire	27,728	43.89%	34,400	54.45%	1,049	1.66%	-6,672	-10.56%	63,177
Florence	2,356	74.60%	783	24.79%	19	0.60%	1,573	49.81%	3,158
Fond du Lac	37,272	63.68%	20,495	35.02%	760	1.30%	16,777	28.67%	58,527
Forest	3,382	66.35%	1,681	32.98%	34	0.67%	1,701	33.37%	5,097
Grant	15,922	58.31%	10,966	40.16%	418	1.53%	4,956	18.15%	27,306
Green	10,843	49.12%	10,903	49.39%	330	1.49%	-60	-0.27%	22,076
Green Lake	7,458	67.48%	3,449	31.21%	145	1.31%	4,009	36.27%	11,052
Iowa	6,631	45.18%	7,750	52.80%	296	2.02%	-1,119	-7.62%	14,677
Iron	2,557	62.61%	1,487	36.41%	40	0.98%	1,070	26.20%	4,084
Jackson	6,204	59.07%	4,157	39.58%	141	1.34%	2,047	19.49%	10,502
Jefferson	28,771	57.37%	20,574	41.03%	801	1.60%	8,197	16.35%	50,146
Juneau	9,525	65.45%	4,854	33.35%	174	1.20%	4,671	32.10%	14,553
Kenosha	47,478	52.36%	41,826	46.12%	1,376	1.52%	5,652	6.23%	90,680
Kewaunee	8,267	66.22%	4,059	32.51%	158	1.27%	4,208	33.71%	12,484
La Crosse	32,247	44.63%	39,008	53.98%	1,006	1.39%	-6,761	-9.36%	72,261
Lafayette	5,256	59.51%	3,469	39.28%	107	1.21%	1,787	20.23%	8,832
Langlade	7,782	66.72%	3,746	32.12%	136	1.17%	4,036	34.60%	11,664
Lincoln	10,633	61.79%	6,306	36.64%	270	1.57%	4,327	25.14%	17,209
Manitowoc	28,200	60.89%	17,399	37.57%	717	1.55%	10,801	23.32%	46,316
Marathon	46,213	58.63%	31,529	40.00%	1,084	1.38%	14,684	18.63%	78,826
Marinette	16,670	68.28%	7,415	30.37%	330	1.35%	9,255	37.91%	24,415
Marquette	6,041	64.08%	3,252	34.50%	134	1.42%	2,789	29.59%	9,427
Menominee	296	18.83%	1,266	80.53%	10	0.64%	-970	-61.70%	1,572
Milwaukee	138,022	29.74%	316,292	68.15%	9,793	2.11%	-178,270	-38.41%	464,107
Monroe	14,563	62.32%	8,476	36.27%	330	1.41%	6,087	26.05%	23,369
Oconto	17,675	70.95%	6,967	27.97%	270	1.08%	10,708	42.98%	24,912
Oneida	14,455	58.06%	10,080	40.49%	360	1.45%	4,375	17.57%	24,895
Outagamie	60,827	54.34%	49,438	44.17%	1,667	1.49%	11,389	10.17%	111,932
Ozaukee	34,504	54.36%	27,874	43.92%	1,094	1.72%	6,630	10.45%	63,472
Pepin	2,798	64.26%	1,523	34.98%	33	0.76%	1,275	29.28%	4,354
Pierce	14,417	56.78%	10,171	40.06%	804	3.17%	4,246	16.72%	25,392
Polk	18,296	64.83%	9,567	33.90%	359	1.27%	8,729	30.93%	28,222
Portage	20,987	48.52%	21,503	49.71%	768	1.78%	-516	-1.19%	43,258
Price	5,763	65.07%	3,005	33.93%	88	0.99%	2,758	31.14%	8,856
Racine	56,347	52.33%	49,721	46.17%	1,618	1.50%	6,626	6.15%	107,686
Richland	5,207	55.85%	3,985	42.74%	131	1.41%	1,222	13.11%	9,323
Rock	40,218	45.54%	46,642	52.82%	1,450	1.64%	-6,424	-7.27%	88,310
Rusk	5,660	68.44%	2,516	30.42%	94	1.14%	3,144	38.02%	8,270
Sauk	18,798	50.02%	18,172	48.35%	614	1.63%	626	1.67%	37,584
Sawyer	6,422	57.65%	4,599	41.28%	119	1.07%	1,823	16.36%	11,140
Shawano	15,850	67.45%	7,336	31.22%	314	1.34%	8,514	36.23%	23,500
Sheboygan	38,763	57.37%	27,735	41.05%	1,064	1.57%	11,028	16.32%	67,562
St. Croix	35,537	58.60%	23,870	39.36%	1,235	2.04%	11,667	19.24%	60,642
Taylor	8,209	73.39%	2,823	25.24%	154	1.38%	5,386	48.15%	11,186
Trempealeau	9,661	60.08%	6,219	38.68%	199	1.24%	3,442	21.41%	16,079
Vernon	8,807	53.03%	7,514	45.24%	288	1.73%	1,293	7.78%	16,609
Vilas	9,837	60.97%	6,119	37.92%	179	1.11%	3,718	23.04%	16,135
Walworth	36,603	60.40%	23,161	38.22%	833	1.37%	13,442	22.18%	60,597
Washburn	6,962	63.42%	3,867	35.22%	149	1.36%	3,095	28.19%	10,978
Washington	61,604	67.40%	28,504	31.18%	1,299	1.42%	33,100	36.21%	91,407
Waukesha	162,768	59.02%	108,478	39.33%	4,541	1.65%	54,290	19.69%	275,787
Waupaca	20,093	66.09%	9,947	32.72%	363	1.19%	10,146	33.37%	30,403
Waushara	9,625	67.01%	4,571	31.82%	167	1.16%	5,054	35.19%	14,363
Winnebago	49,179	51.57%	44,660	46.83%	1,532	1.61%	4,519	4.74%	95,371
Wood	24,997	59.21%	16,599	39.32%	620	1.47%	8,398	19.89%	42,216
Totals	1,697,626	49.60%	1,668,229	48.74%	57,063	1.67%	29,397	0.86%	3,422,918

County that flipped from Democratic to Republican

- Sauk (largest municipality: Baraboo)

==== By congressional district ====
Trump won six of eight congressional districts.

District	Harris	Trump	Representative
1st	46.89%	51.39%	Bryan Steil
2nd	69.16%	29.12%	Mark Pocan
3rd	45.46%	52.84%	Derrick Van Orden
4th	74.68%	23.28%	Gwen Moore
5th	38.15%	60.24%	Scott L. Fitzgerald
6th	41.02%	57.46%	Glenn Grothman
7th	37.94%	60.40%	Tom Tiffany
8th	41.17%	57.40%	Tony Wied

== Analysis ==
Trump's victory in the state made him the first Republican candidate to carry Wisconsin twice since Ronald Reagan did so in 1980 and 1984. He also received nearly 1.7 million votes, a record for a candidate in the history of the state. Wisconsin was the closest state in the election by margin of victory, with Trump only winning it by 0.86%, thus making it the only state to be decided by less than a 1% margin. Wisconsin also shifted rightward by about 1.5 points, the weakest such shift in any of the swing states in the election. While almost all of the state's counties swung right from 2020, Harris improved in the three WOW counties and Door County. Harris' margin of defeat in Wisconsin in 2024 was also slightly higher than that of Hillary Clinton's (0.77%) in 2016. Wisconsin was one of only six states where Harris received more raw votes than Biden in 2020. (Note: The other five states were Georgia, Maine, Nevada, North Carolina, and Utah.)

As of 2024, Wisconsin has, together with Michigan and Pennsylvania, the longest-running active streak among states of voting for the winning presidential candidate, having done so in the latest five presidential elections. The results also extended it to nine consecutive presidential elections where the winning party did not differ between those three states. This was the first election since 2012 where Wisconsin voted to the left of the nation as a whole. This was also the first time that Door County voted for the losing candidate of the presidential election since 1992, a record it shared with Blaine County, Montana, up until this election where Blaine County became the sole longest bellwether county. This election was also the first time since 1988 that Wisconsin voted to the left of neighboring Michigan.

== See also ==
- United States presidential elections in Wisconsin
- 2024 United States presidential election
- 2024 Democratic Party presidential primaries
- 2024 Republican Party presidential primaries
- 2024 United States elections

== Notes ==
Partisan clients
