= 1988 United States presidential election in Wisconsin =

- November 8, 1988

Nominee	Michael Dukakis	George H. W. Bush
Party	Democratic	Republican
Home state	Massachusetts	Texas
Running mate	Lloyd Bentsen	Dan Quayle
Electoral vote	11	0
Popular vote	1,126,794	1,047,499
Percentage	51.41%	47.80%

Dukakis
40–50%
50–60%
60–70%
70–80%
Bush
40–50%
50–60%
60–70%
President before election
Ronald Reagan
Republican
Elected President
George H. W. Bush
Republican

The 1988 United States presidential election in Wisconsin took place on November 8, 1988. All 50 states and the District of Columbia, were part of the 1988 United States presidential election. State voters chose 11 electors to the Electoral College, which selected the president and vice president.

Wisconsin was won by Massachusetts Governor Michael Dukakis who was running against incumbent United States Vice President George H. W. Bush of Texas. Dukakis ran with Texas Senator Lloyd Bentsen as Vice President, and Bush ran with Indiana Senator Dan Quayle. Dukakis won the election in Wisconsin with a four-point margin, likely due to the 1980s farm crisis which devastated rural areas of Wisconsin. The state has since consistently voted for the Democratic Party, until the narrow victory of Republican Donald Trump in 2016 and again in 2024. This is also the last time Wisconsin would vote differently to fellow Rust Belt swing states Michigan and Pennsylvania, as all three had Democratic winning streaks from 1992 to 2012, with all three states flipping simultaneously in 2016, 2020, and 2024 as well as the last time Wisconsin was the most Democratic-leaning of the three Rust Belt swing states until 2024.

The election was very partisan, with over 99 percent of the electorate voting for either the Republican or Democratic parties, although five additional candidates were on the ballot. Dukakis and Bush almost evenly split Wisconsin's seventy-two counties – Dukakis won 37 and Bush won 35. Dukakis won the large urban counties containing Madison (Dane County), Milwaukee, Racine and Kenosha, alongside almost entirely Native American Menominee County and the heavily unionized Scandinavian-American counties of the northwest. Bush won the suburban "WOW counties" and the more conservative, historically German Catholic, counties of the rural eastern half of the state. Over the state as a whole, Dukakis did best, as usual, in Menominee County, and Bush did best in Ozaukee County.

== Results ==
1988 United States presidential election in Wisconsin
Party	Candidate	Votes	Percentage	Electoral votes
Democratic	Michael Dukakis	1,126,794	51.41%	11
Republican	George H. W. Bush	1,047,499	47.80%	0
Independent	Ron Paul	5,157	0.24%	0
Independent	David Duke	3,056	0.14%	0
Independent	James Warren	2,574 (Note: Votes for this candidate were not separated by county but listed only as a statewide total.)	0.12%	0
Independent	Lyndon LaRouche	2,302	0.11%	0
Write-ins		2,273	0.10%	0
Independent	Lenora Fulani	1,953	0.09%	0
Totals		2,191,608	100.0%	11

=== Results by county ===
County	Michael Dukakis Democratic		George H. W. Bush Republican		Ron Paul Independent		David Duke Independent		Margin		Total votes cast
County	#	%	#	%	#	%	#	%	#	%	Total votes cast
Adams	3,598	52.27%	3,258	47.33%	8	0.12%	19	0.28%	340	4.94%	6,883
Ashland	4,526	60.49%	2,926	39.11%	10	0.13%	20	0.27%	1,600	21.38%	7,482
Barron	8,951	50.94%	8,527	48.53%	45	0.26%	47	0.27%	424	2.41%	17,570
Bayfield	4,323	57.96%	3,095	41.50%	12	0.16%	28	0.38%	1,228	16.46%	7,458
Brown	41,788	48.62%	43,625	50.75%	196	0.23%	344	0.40%	-1,837	-2.13%	85,953
Buffalo	3,481	55.14%	2,783	44.08%	23	0.36%	26	0.41%	698	11.06%	6,313
Burnett	3,537	54.71%	2,884	44.61%	11	0.17%	33	0.51%	653	10.10%	6,465
Calumet	6,481	44.06%	8,107	55.12%	21	0.14%	99	0.67%	-1,626	-11.06%	14,708
Chippewa	11,447	53.61%	9,757	45.69%	53	0.25%	97	0.45%	1,690	7.92%	21,354
Clark	6,642	50.95%	6,296	48.30%	19	0.15%	79	0.61%	346	2.65%	13,036
Columbia	9,132	46.28%	10,475	53.09%	45	0.23%	78	0.40%	-1,343	-6.81%	19,730
Crawford	3,608	52.34%	3,238	46.98%	22	0.32%	25	0.36%	370	5.36%	6,893
Dane	105,414	59.92%	69,143	39.30%	543	0.31%	834	0.47%	36,271	20.62%	175,934
Dodge	12,663	42.31%	17,003	56.81%	66	0.22%	195	0.65%	-4,340	-14.50%	29,927
Door	5,425	43.67%	6,907	55.60%	20	0.16%	70	0.56%	-1,482	-11.93%	12,422
Douglas	13,907	68.01%	6,440	31.49%	34	0.17%	68	0.33%	7,467	36.52%	20,449
Dunn	9,205	55.47%	7,273	43.83%	37	0.22%	79	0.48%	1,932	11.64%	16,594
Eau Claire	21,150	54.20%	17,664	45.27%	60	0.15%	149	0.38%	3,486	8.93%	39,023
Florence	1,018	47.53%	1,106	51.63%	4	0.19%	14	0.65%	-88	-4.10%	2,142
Fond du Lac	15,887	41.62%	21,985	57.59%	86	0.23%	217	0.57%	-6,098	-15.97%	38,175
Forest	2,142	53.43%	1,845	46.02%	4	0.10%	18	0.45%	297	7.41%	4,009
Grant	9,421	48.12%	10,049	51.32%	44	0.22%	66	0.34%	-628	-3.20%	19,580
Green	5,153	43.27%	6,636	55.73%	41	0.34%	78	0.66%	-1,483	-12.46%	11,908
Green Lake	3,033	36.55%	5,205	62.72%	21	0.25%	40	0.48%	-2,172	-26.17%	8,299
Iowa	4,268	49.93%	4,240	49.60%	13	0.15%	27	0.32%	28	0.33%	8,548
Iron	2,090	56.26%	1,599	43.04%	5	0.13%	21	0.57%	491	13.22%	3,715
Jackson	3,924	52.20%	3,555	47.29%	11	0.15%	27	0.36%	369	4.91%	7,517
Jefferson	11,816	44.86%	14,309	54.32%	74	0.28%	143	0.54%	-2,493	-9.46%	26,342
Juneau	3,734	43.11%	4,869	56.21%	18	0.21%	41	0.47%	-1,135	-13.10%	8,662
Kenosha	30,089	57.72%	21,661	41.55%	120	0.23%	259	0.50%	8,428	16.17%	52,129
Kewaunee	4,786	52.14%	4,330	47.17%	8	0.09%	55	0.60%	456	4.97%	9,179
La Crosse	22,204	50.39%	21,548	48.90%	100	0.23%	214	0.49%	656	1.49%	44,066
Lafayette	3,521	48.70%	3,665	50.69%	15	0.21%	29	0.40%	-144	-1.99%	7,230
Langlade	4,254	46.31%	4,884	53.17%	16	0.17%	32	0.35%	-630	-6.86%	9,186
Lincoln	5,819	52.06%	5,257	47.03%	33	0.30%	69	0.62%	562	5.03%	11,178
Manitowoc	19,680	54.69%	16,020	44.52%	63	0.18%	224	0.62%	3,660	10.17%	35,987
Marathon	24,658	49.79%	24,482	49.44%	125	0.25%	256	0.52%	176	0.35%	49,521
Marinette	8,030	45.20%	9,637	54.25%	26	0.15%	71	0.40%	-1,607	-9.05%	17,764
Marquette	2,463	44.24%	3,059	54.95%	15	0.27%	30	0.54%	-596	-10.71%	5,567
Menominee	1,028	72.55%	381	26.89%	0	0.00%	8	0.56%	647	45.66%	1,417
Milwaukee	268,287	61.04%	168,363	38.30%	1,082	0.25%	1,813	0.41%	99,924	22.74%	439,545
Monroe	6,437	47.38%	7,073	52.06%	29	0.21%	46	0.34%	-636	-4.68%	13,585
Oconto	6,549	47.75%	7,084	51.65%	23	0.17%	60	0.44%	-535	-3.90%	13,716
Oneida	7,414	47.31%	8,130	51.88%	55	0.35%	71	0.45%	-716	-4.57%	15,670
Outagamie	27,771	45.32%	33,113	54.04%	103	0.17%	291	0.47%	-5,342	-8.72%	61,278
Ozaukee	12,661	35.35%	22,899	63.94%	107	0.30%	145	0.40%	-10,238	-28.59%	35,812
Pepin	1,906	58.68%	1,311	40.36%	8	0.25%	23	0.71%	595	18.32%	3,248
Pierce	8,659	58.55%	6,045	40.87%	33	0.22%	52	0.35%	2,614	17.68%	14,789
Polk	8,981	56.22%	6,866	42.98%	43	0.27%	85	0.53%	2,115	13.24%	15,975
Portage	16,317	57.18%	12,057	42.25%	48	0.17%	113	0.40%	4,260	14.93%	28,535
Price	3,987	53.18%	3,450	46.02%	12	0.16%	48	0.64%	537	7.16%	7,497
Racine	39,631	51.72%	36,342	47.42%	213	0.28%	445	0.58%	3,289	4.30%	76,631
Richland	3,643	47.26%	4,026	52.23%	16	0.21%	23	0.30%	-383	-4.97%	7,708
Rock	29,576	50.83%	28,178	48.43%	158	0.27%	276	0.47%	1,398	2.40%	58,188
Rusk	3,888	55.51%	3,063	43.73%	18	0.26%	35	0.50%	825	11.78%	7,004
Sauk	8,324	44.54%	10,225	54.72%	35	0.19%	103	0.55%	-1,901	-10.18%	18,687
Sawyer	3,231	49.43%	3,260	49.88%	20	0.31%	25	0.38%	-29	-0.45%	6,536
Shawano	6,587	43.78%	8,362	55.57%	21	0.14%	77	0.51%	-1,775	-11.79%	15,047
Sheboygan	23,429	49.66%	23,471	49.75%	86	0.18%	191	0.40%	-42	-0.09%	47,177
St. Croix	11,392	52.90%	9,960	46.25%	62	0.29%	119	0.55%	1,432	6.65%	21,533
Taylor	3,785	46.73%	4,254	52.52%	15	0.19%	46	0.57%	-469	-5.79%	8,100
Trempealeau	6,212	55.59%	4,902	43.87%	16	0.14%	45	0.40%	1,310	11.72%	11,175
Vernon	5,754	51.94%	5,226	47.17%	35	0.32%	63	0.57%	528	4.77%	11,078
Vilas	3,781	38.89%	5,842	60.09%	21	0.22%	78	0.80%	-2,061	-21.20%	9,722
Walworth	12,203	39.77%	18,259	59.50%	91	0.30%	132	0.43%	-6,056	-19.73%	30,685
Washburn	3,393	52.15%	3,074	47.25%	13	0.20%	26	0.40%	319	4.90%	6,506
Washington	15,907	39.24%	24,328	60.01%	109	0.27%	195	0.48%	-8,421	-20.77%	40,539
Waukesha	57,598	38.68%	90,467	60.76%	402	0.27%	426	0.29%	-32,869	-22.08%	148,893
Waupaca	7,078	37.74%	11,559	61.62%	30	0.16%	90	0.48%	-4,481	-23.88%	18,757
Waushara	3,535	41.33%	4,953	57.91%	18	0.21%	47	0.55%	-1,418	-16.58%	8,553
Winnebago	28,508	44.54%	35,085	54.82%	119	0.19%	294	0.46%	-6,577	-10.28%	64,006
Wood	16,074	48.93%	16,549	50.38%	52	0.16%	173	0.53%	-475	-1.45%	32,848
Totals	1,126,794	51.41%	1,047,499	47.80%	5,157	0.24%	3,056	0.14%	79,295	3.61%	2,191,608

==== Counties that flipped from Republican to Democratic ====
- Adams
- Barron
- Buffalo
- Burnett
- Chippewa
- Clark
- Crawford
- Dunn
- Eau Claire
- Forest
- Iowa
- Jackson
- Kewaunee
- La Crosse
- Lincoln
- Marathon
- Pierce
- Polk
- Price
- Racine
- Rock
- Rusk
- St. Croix
- Trempealeau
- Vernon
- Washburn

== Analysis ==
Wisconsin weighed in for this election as 12 points more Democratic than the national average. As of 2024, this is the last election in which Green County voted for a Republican presidential candidate, in which the state would vote to the left of neighboring Illinois, and in which the Democratic candidate won Wisconsin while simultaneously losing Illinois. It was also the last election until 2016 in which both Wisconsin and Illinois voted differently. Additionally, it was the last election until 2024 in which Wisconsin voted to the left of both neighboring Michigan and fellow Rust Belt state Pennsylvania, as well as the most recent election where Wisconsin, Michigan, and Pennsylvania all did not vote for the same candidate.

It was also the first time since 1960 that Wisconsin would back the losing candidate in a presidential election. It was also the first time since 1848 that the state would back a losing Democrat in a presidential election and this feat would be reprised by Al Gore in 2000 and John Kerry in 2004. It was also the first time ever that the state would back a Democrat while a Republican won the presidency and this feat would be reprised by George W. Bush, Bush's son, in 2000 and 2004. Conversely, this was the first time since 1924 that a Republican won without the state. Grant, Sauk, and Lafayette counties would not vote Republican again until 2016.

== See also ==
- Presidency of George H. W. Bush
- United States presidential elections in Wisconsin
