= Andrew Humphreys =

American politician

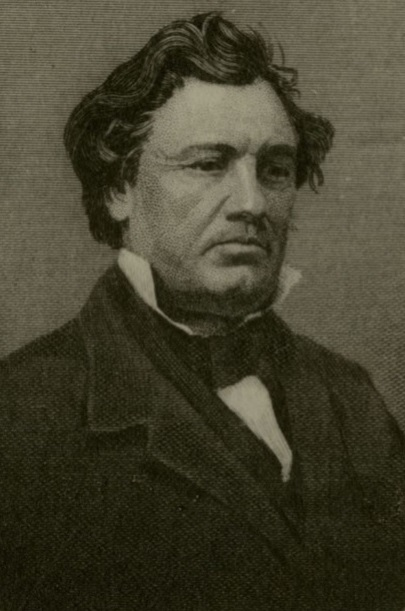

Member of the United States House of Representatives from Indiana's 2nd congressional district
- In office December 5, 1876 – March 3, 1877
- Preceded by: James D. Williams
- Succeeded by: Thomas R. Cobb

Member of the Indiana Senate
- In office 1896-1900; 1878-1882; 1874-1876

Member of the Indiana House of Representatives
- In office 1857; 1849-1852

Personal details
- Born: March 30, 1821 near Knoxville, Tennessee
- Died: June 14, 1904 (aged 83) Linton, Indiana
- Resting place: Moss Cemetery; Linton, Indiana
- Party: Democratic
- Profession: Politician farmer

Andrew Humphreys (March 30, 1821 – June 14, 1904) was a U.S. representative from Bloomfield, Greene County, Indiana, who served in the Forty-fourth Congress. Prior to the American Civil War, Humphreys was as a member of the Indiana House of Representatives (1849 to 1852, and January 8 to March 9, 1857), and an Indian agent for Utah. In 1864 Humphreys was a defendant in a controversial trial by a military commission that convened on October 21 at Indianapolis, where he and three others were convicted of treason. Humphreys was sentenced to hard labor for the remainder of the war, but the sentence was modified three weeks later to allow for his release (Humphreys was required to remain within two specific townships in Greene County, and could not participate in any acts that opposed the war). At the end of the war, Humphreys resumed a career in politics, which included terms in Forty-fourth Congress (December 5, 1876 to March 3, 1877) and the Indiana Senate (1874 to 1876, 1878 to 1882, and 1896 to 1900).

== Early life ==
Born near Knoxville, Tennessee, Humphreys moved with his parents to Owen County, Indiana, in 1829. Afterwards, the family relocated to Putnam County, near Manhattan, where Humphreys attended the common schools. He moved to Greene County in 1842.

== Early career ==
Humphreys, who was a Democrat, settled in Bloomfield, Greene County, Indiana, and served as a member of the Indiana House of Representatives from 1849 to 1852, and from January 8 to March 9, 1857. He was appointed Indian agent for Utah by President Buchanan in 1857.

== Anti-war Democrat ==
During the American Civil War, Humphreys was critical of Indiana's Republican governor, Oliver P. Morton, and President Abraham Lincoln's conduct of the war. Harrison H. Dodd, "grand commander" of the Sons of Liberty in Indiana, chose Humphreys as one of his major generals in a secret society who opposed the war.

On September 17, 1864, General Alvin Peterson Hovey, commander of the Military District of Indiana, authorized a military commission to meet on September 19 at Indianapolis, Indiana, to begin trials of Dodd and others placed under military arrest. On October 7, 1864, Humphreys was arrested and imprisoned in the Federal Building at Indianapolis, where he became one of the defendants in the Indianapolis treason trials before the military commission. Among the other men accused of treason were Democrats Lambdin P. Milligan, a lawyer living in Huntington, Indiana; William A. Bowles of French Lick, Indiana; and Stephen Horsey of Martin County, Indiana.

The military commission for the trial of Humphreys, Milligan, Horsey, and Bowles convened at Indianapolis on October 21, 1864, to consider five charges against the men: conspiracy against the U.S. government; offering aid and comfort to the Confederates; inciting insurrections; "disloyal practices"; and "violation of the laws of war." The defendants were alleged to have established a secret organization that planned to liberate Confederates from Union prisoner-of-war camps in Illinois, Indiana, and Ohio; seize an arsenal to provide the freed prisoners with arms; raise an armed force to incite a general insurrection; join with the Confederates to invade Indiana and Illinois; and make war on the U.S. government.

Democrats charged that the arrests and trials by military commission were politically motivated amid a climate of bitter political disputes between Democrats and Republicans about the conduct of the war. Scholars who studied the trials, which were highly publicized in the press, have proposed that they were prompted by partisan politics, convened before commission of biased military officers, failed to follow the rules of evidence, and used questionable informers as witnesses. The controversial proceedings led to the landmark U.S. Supreme Court case known as Ex parte Milligan. The Court ruled the application of military tribunals to citizens when civilian courts are still operating is unconstitutional.

On December 10, 1864, the commission found Humphreys, Milligan, Horsey, and Bowles guilty on all charges. Humphreys was sentenced to hard labor for the remainder of the war. Compared to the others accused as co-conspirators, the case against Humphreys was weaker and his sentence was less severe. (Milligan, Bowles, and Horsey were sentenced to hang, but the sentences were commuted to life imprisonment in May, 1865.) Three weeks after his conviction, and with President Lincoln's support, General Hovey modified Humphreys's sentence, allowing his release. Humphreys was required to remain within two specific townships in Greene County and could not participate in any acts that opposed the war. After the U.S. Supreme Court handed down their ruling in Ex parte Milligan on April 3, 1866, the men were released from custody.

== Later career ==
Humphreys was the first of the defendants from the Indianapolis treason trials to turn to the civilian courts seeking damages from his arrest, trial, and confinement. On February 1, 1866, he filed a complaint in a circuit court in Sullivan County, Indiana, against Samuel McCormick, the U.S. Army captain who arrested him. Humphrey won the suit and was awarded $25,000 in damages, but the case bogged down during its appeal and he never collected the funds. After Congress amended the Habeas Corpus Suspension Act of March 3, 1863, ending further suits in the civil courts from those who had been arbitrarily arrested during the war, Humphreys returned to a career in politics. Although he lost his bid to win a seat in the Indiana General Assembly by a narrow margin in 1868, Humphreys remained active in politics. He served as a delegate to the Democratic National Convention in 1872 and 1888.

Humphreys was elected to the Indiana Senate three times, serving from 1874 to 1876, from 1878 to 1882, and from 1896 to 1900. Humphreys began his first term in the Indiana Senate in 1874, but resigned in 1876 to run for a seat in the U.S Congress. Humphreys was elected as a Democrat to the Forty-fourth Congress to fill the vacancy caused by the resignation of James D. Williams and served from December 5, 1876, to March 3, 1877. Humphreys returned to the Indiana Senate in 1878 and became chairman of its ways and means committee. In 1896, at the age of seventy-four, the Democrats drafted Humphreys to run for another term in the Indiana Senate. Humphreys won the election and served until 1900.

Although Humphreys continued agricultural pursuits in Greene County, Indiana, he remained active in politics. Humphreys attended nearly every Democratic State convention during his political life.

Humphreys died at Linton, Indiana, on June 14, 1904, and is interred in Moss Cemetery.

== See also ==
- Copperheads

U.S. House of Representatives
Preceded by James D. Williams	Member of the U.S. House of Representatives from Indiana's 2nd congressional district 1876-1877	Succeeded by Thomas R. Cobb
