= Lambdin P. Milligan =

American lawyer

Lambdin Purdy Milligan
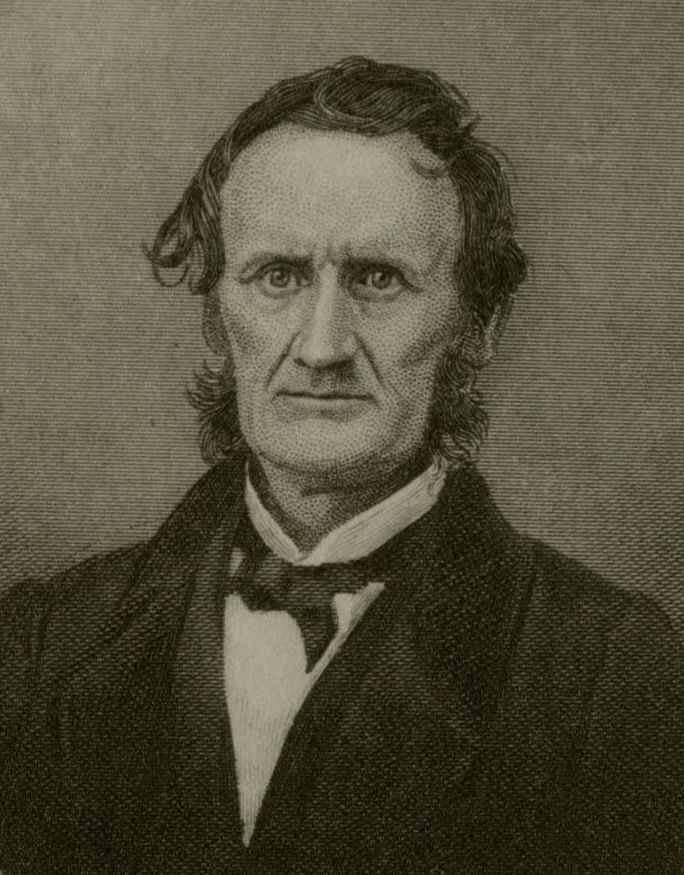
- Portrait of Milligan, c. 1864
- Born: March 24, 1812 near Saint Clairsville, Ohio, U.S.
- Died: December 21, 1899 (aged 87); Huntington County, Indiana, U.S.
- Occupations: Lawyer, farmer
- Known for: Ex parte Milligan

Lambdin Purdy Milligan (March 24, 1812 – December 21, 1899) was an American lawyer and farmer who was the subject of Ex parte Milligan 71 U.S. (4 Wall.) 2 (1866), a landmark case by the Supreme Court of the United States. He was known for his extreme opinions on states' rights and his opposition to the Lincoln administration's conduct of the American Civil War.

Believing that the Confederate states of the South had the power under the U.S. Constitution to secede from the Union, Milligan opposed the war to reunite the nation. He became a leader of the secret Order of American Knights (formerly the Knights of the Golden Circle and later the Order of the Sons of Liberty) and advocated violent revolution against the U.S. government. U.S. Army forces arrested him at his home and tried him and other conspirators by military commission for disloyalty and conspiracy. Found guilty, he was sentenced to death. A habeas corpus appeal made its way from the federal circuit court in Indianapolis to the U.S. Supreme Court, which in 1866 ruled that the application of military tribunals to citizens when civil courts are open and operating was unconstitutional.

Following the Court's ruling on April 3, 1866, Milligan and the others were released from custody. He returned home and practiced law in Huntington, Indiana, where he later filed a civil suit claiming damages for the military arrest and trial. On May 30, 1871, the jury found in Milligan's favor, but federal and state statutes limited the award for damages to five dollars (~$120.00 in 2025) plus court costs.

== Early life and education ==
Milligan, who was of Irish descent, was born on a farm near Saint Clairsville, in Kirkwood Township, Belmont County, Ohio. His parents were Moses Milligan Sr, a soldier in the American Revolutionary War, and Mary (née Purday) Milligan. Lambdin was the eighth of nine siblings.

Milligan's formal schooling ended when he was eight years old. Milligan's father wanted him to attend college to study medicine, but his mother disagreed, insisting that if none of their other children could pursue high education, then neither should seventeen-year-old Lambdin. Despite his father threatening to disinherit him, Milligan left home. He began teaching in the local schools at the age of nineteen, but turned to law, studying at a firm in Saint Clairsville. Milligan was admitted to the Ohio bar on October 27, 1835. He was among the class of nine new lawyers that included Edwin M. Stanton, who became a member of Lincoln's cabinet during the American Civil War.

Milligan moved to Cadiz, in Harrison County, Ohio, where he continued his law practice, before relocating to Huntington County, Indiana, in 1845. At Huntington, Milligan edited a local newspaper, The Democratic Age, in 1849–50, but it went out of business within a year. He resumed his law practice in 1853.

== Marriage and family ==
Milligan married Sarah L. Ridgeway on October 27, 1835, the same day he passed the Ohio bar. The couple had three children. Sarah died on November 20, 1870. Three years later, on August 12, 1873, Milligan married Maria L. (née Humphreys) Cavender, a widow who was a native of Madison, Indiana.

== Lawyer and anti-war Democrat ==
From his youth, Milligan was active in partisan politics. As a young man, he took a prominent role in Belmont County Democratic Party affairs in defense of Jeffersonian states-rights positions. During the Nullification Crisis of the early 1830s, he echoed South Carolinian John C. Calhoun's stance that the states could "nullify" offensive federal laws. He followed Calhoun into the Whig Party, but then followed Calhoun back to the Democratic Party when President Martin Van Buren wooed him back to the fold. Milligan continued to be active in Democratic Party affairs after his move to Indiana. Resuming his law practice after a hiatus of real estate speculation and holding county positions, he developed a solid reputation as a successful lawyer, mostly representing small railroad companies. Milligan also ran as a Democrat for political office, but consistently lost at the polls. In 1862 he failed to secure Indiana's Democratic nomination for a seat in Congress, and in 1864 he failed to get the Democratic nomination for governor of Indiana. In the course of his career, he only managed to win the post of township trustee.

Milligan was highly outspoken in political affairs and was labeled a Copperhead for his frank opposition to the Civil War. Milligan, who advocated compromise before the war, was a staunch supporter of state sovereignty and opposed the federal government's efforts to keep southern states from seceding from the Union. Once the war began, he opposed the Lincoln administration's conduct of it.

In the spring of 1863, Milligan defended Alexander J. Douglas, an Indiana state senator, in a trial by an Ohio military commission. Douglas was found guilty of violating a military order that banned criticism of the Lincoln administration's conduct of the war, but was released after Indiana's Republican governor, Oliver P. Morton, lobbied the president and his cabinet. Morton suggested that the army's overbearing tactics were worsening political opposition, not improving the situation. Milligan's final courtroom speech in Douglas's behalf was circulated in the local Democratic newspapers, increasing the lawyer's notoriety. In the following months, Milligan publicly protested the Union's waging war against the Confederacy and joined a secret society that opposed the war. Milligan was especially critical of President Lincoln and Governor Morton, who were his frequent targets.

In November 1863 Milligan attended a meeting of the Order of the American Knights, the new name of the Knights of the Golden Circle, a secret organization active in discouraging soldier enlistments, encouraging desertion, and resisting the draft. The OAK later changed its name to the Sons of Liberty. Harrison H. Dodd, "grand commander" of the Order in Indiana, chose several men, including Milligan, to assist him, but this was not known to the group's rank-and-file members. By the end of 1863 military authorities in Indianapolis believed that Milligan was involved in a conspiracy against the United States and sent army detectives to observe his actions. During the spring and summer of 1864, Milligan continued to oppose the Lincoln administration, arguing that the president's efforts to coerce the southern rebels were unconstitutional. In May 1864 Federal authorities obtained evidence that Milligan was active in conspiracy to obstruct the war effort and to raise rebellion in Indiana. On August 13, 1864, Milligan addressed a public meeting at Fort Wayne, Indiana, calling on Democrats to rise up in arms to fight for "liberty, order and peace." This speech closely coincided with a plot in Indianapolis on August 16 to attack the prisoner-of-war camp, Camp Morton, to release Confederate soldiers held there. As well, a large quantity of firearms and ammunition was discovered in an Indianapolis warehouse belonging to H.H. Dodd, increasing the fear of an uprising in the state. Within a few weeks, military authorities began to arrest the alleged conspirators.

=== Arrest and detention ===
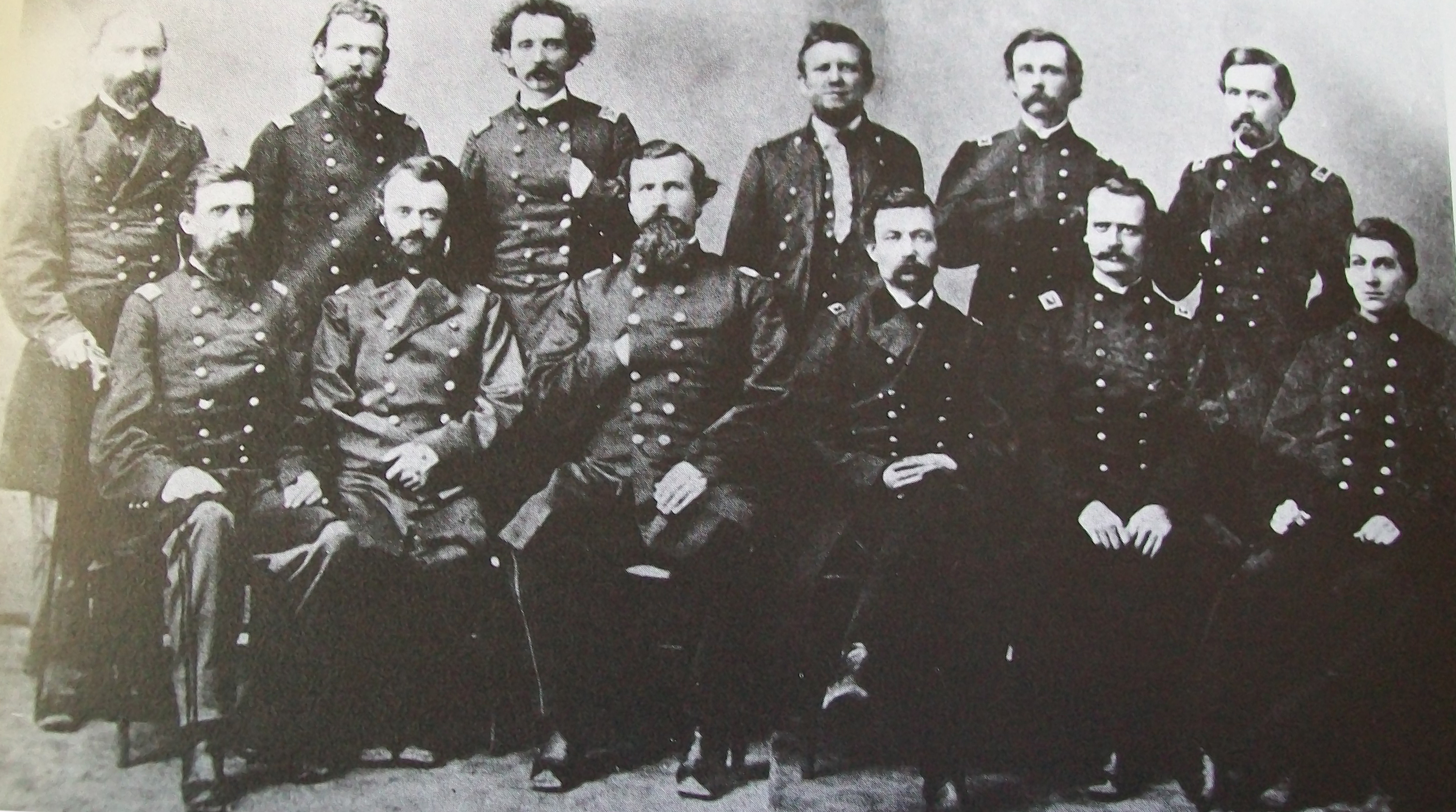
Military commission that originally convicted Milligan.

On September 17, 1864, General Alvin Peterson Hovey, commander of the Military District of Indiana, authorized a military commission to meet on September 19 at Indianapolis, Indiana, to begin trials of those placed under military arrest. Dodd was the first to be tried. Shortly thereafter, commanders ordered the arrest of other leaders of the Sons of Liberty. These included William A. Bowles of French Lick, Indiana; Joseph J. Bingham, editor of the Indianapolis Daily Sentinel and chairman of Indiana's Democratic State Central Committee; Horace Heffren, editor of the Washington (Indiana) Democrat; Stephen Horsey of Martin County, Indiana; and Andrew Humphreys of Bloomfield, Indiana. Among them was Lambdin Milligan, who was arrested at his Huntington home on October 6, 1864. Two other men, James B. Wilson and David T. Yeakel, were also seized. Because President Lincoln had suspended the writ of habeas corpus on September 24, 1862, as authorized under Article 1 of the U.S. Constitution, and Congress ratified this action on March 3, 1863, with the passage of the Habeas Corpus Suspension Act, no warrant or affidavit was issued to show justification for Milligan's arrest.

Dodd escaped from jail during his trial and fled to Canada. He was found guilty in absentia on October 10, 1864, and sentenced to hang. Charges against Bingham, Heffren, Harrison, Yeakel, and Wilson were dismissed with deals to be witnesses for the military prosecution.

=== Trial and conviction ===
The military tribunal for the trial of Milligan, Bowles, Horsey, and Humphreys convened at Indianapolis on October 21, 1864. The commission considered five charges:

1. Conspiracy against the U.S. government
2. Offering aid and comfort to the Confederates
3. Inciting insurrections
4. Disloyal practices
5. Violation of the laws of war

The defendants were accused of establishing a secret organization that planned to liberate Confederate prisoners from Union prisoner-of-war camps in Illinois, Indiana, and Ohio; steal weapons from an arsenal; raise an armed force to incite a general insurrection; and join with the Confederates to invade Indiana, Illinois, and Kentucky and make war on the U.S. government.

Democrats charged that the arrests and trials by military commission were politically motivated amid a climate of bitter political disputes between Democrats and Republicans about the conduct of the war. Scholars who have studied the trials believe the adjutant general did not adequately prove that Milligan was guilty of the charges made against him. In addition, they suggest that the trials, which were highly publicized in the press, were prompted by partisan politics, convened before commission of biased military officers, failed to follow the rules of evidence, and used questionable informers as witnesses. The Indianapolis Daily Sentinel, which supported the Democrats, blamed Governor Morton, a Republican, for the arrest and detention of its editor, Bingham, and called on the state's voters to oppose Morton's re-election in 1864. During the trials, members of the military commissions made speeches at Republican rallies. The controversial proceedings led to the landmark U.S. Supreme Court case known as Ex parte Milligan.

On December 10, 1864, Milligan, Bowles, and Horsey were found guilty on all charges and sentenced to hang on May 19, 1865. Humphreys was found guilty and sentenced to hard labor for the remainder of the war, but his sentence was later modified, allowing his release. Efforts were made to secure pardons for Milligan, Bowles, and Horsey, with the decision passing to President Andrew Johnson following Lincoln's assassination. On May 16 the executions of Milligan and Bowles were postponed to June 2, and Horsey's sentence was commuted to life imprisonment. President Johnson approved commutation of the sentences for Milligan and Bowles to life imprisonment on May 30, 1865. The prisoners were transferred from Indianapolis to a federal prison at Columbus, Ohio.

=== Circuit Court appeal ===
On May 10, 1865, Jonathan W. Gordon, Milligan's legal counsel, filed a petition in the U.S. Circuit Court for the District of Indiana at Indianapolis for a writ of habeas corpus, which called for a justification of Milligan's arrest. A similar petition was filed on behalf of Bowles and Horsey. Milligan's petition alleged that a federal grand jury had met in Indianapolis during January 1865, which it did, and it had not indicted him, which is also true, making him eligible for a release from prison under the Habeas Corpus Suspension Act (1863).

Justice David Davis, an associate justice of the U.S. Supreme Court and a federal circuit court judge, and Judge Thomas Drummond, another federal circuit court judge, reviewed Milligan's appeal, which claimed he should not have been tried by a military commission. The two judges disagreed over the issue of whether the U.S. Constitution prohibited civilians from being tried by a military commission and passed the case to the U.S. Supreme Court.

== Ex parte Milligan ==
The case, now known as Ex parte Milligan, was argued before the U.S. Supreme Court on March 5 and March 13, 1866. The Court was asked to consider three questions. Should a writ of habeas corpus be issued, based on Milligan's petition? Should Milligan be discharged from custody? Did the military commission have jurisdiction to try and to sentence Milligan? The Court considered only the issues relating to whether or not the commission's proceedings were constitutional, and Milligan's eligibility for a discharge from prison. The Court did not evaluate the charges or the evidence presented in the trial by the military commission, and the Supreme Court case did not affect the military commission's finding that Milligan and the others had been involved in a conspiracy.

The legal team representing the United States was U.S. Attorney General James Speed, Henry Stanbery, and Benjamin F. Butler, a Civil War general who became a congressman and governor of Massachusetts. Milligan's representatives included James A. Garfield, a member of Congress and a future U.S. president; Jeremiah S. Black, President James Buchanan's U.S. Attorney General and U.S. Secretary of State; David Dudley Field, a New York lawyer and brother of U.S. Supreme Court justice Stephen Johnson Field; and Joseph E. McDonald. In Milligan's defense. Garfield used precedents from an eighteenth-century English legal case that challenged the Royal Navy's civil authority involving the execution of a royal governor without due process after he ordered the execution of an army private for allegedly inciting a mutiny.

On April 3, 1866, Justice David Davis handed down the Court's decision, which ruled that the writ of habeas corpus could be issued based on the Habeas Corpus Suspension Act (1863). The Court ruled that the congressional act and the laws of war did not permit the imposition of martial law where civilian courts were open and operating unimpeded. As a matter of constitutional law, the suspension of the writ of habeas corpus did not itself authorize trial by military tribunals. Because the military commission had no jurisdiction to try and sentence Milligan, he was entitled to a release.

=== Discharge from prison ===
Milligan and the others petitions were granted a discharge. Milligan was released from custody on April 12, 1866, and the Court's opinion was read during the next Court session, on December 17, 1866. Justice Davis delivered the majority opinion, explaining that Milligan, who was a civilian not in military service and resident of a state in which civilian courts were still functioning, had a right, when charged with a crime, to be tried and punished according to the law. Justice Davis disagreed with the federal government's argument regarding the propriety of the military commission, stating that "martial rule can never exist when the courts are open" and confined martial law to areas of "military operations, where war really prevails," and when it became a necessity to provide a substitute for a civil authority that had been overthrown. The civilian courts were still operating in Indiana at the time of Milligan's arrest, trial, and incarceration. Chief Justice Chase and three associate justices filed a separate opinion concurring with the majority in the judgment, but asserted that Congress had the power to authorize a military commission, although it had not done so in Milligan's case.

== Later years ==
After Milligan's release from prison, he returned to his home and law practice in Huntington, Indiana, where the locals gave him a "great ovation".

In 1868 Milligan filed a civil lawsuit in Huntington County, Indiana, seeking $500,000 (~$10.1 million in 2025) in damages for conspiracy, false imprisonment, and libel related to the Ex parte Milligan case. His civil case, "the first major civil rights jury trial held before the federal courts," was referred to the U.S. Circuit Court for Indiana at Indianapolis, where it evolved into Milligan v. Hovey, a two-week jury trial held in May 1871. Several men involved in Milligan's treason trial, including Alvin P. Hovey and Oliver P. Morton, were named as defendants. Milligan's legal counsel was Thomas A. Hendricks, a former state legislator, member of Congress, and future governor of Indiana. Benjamin Harrison, an Indianapolis lawyer and future U.S. president, represented the defendants.

The jury was asked to consider what damages, if any, Milligan had sustained relating to Ex parte Milligan. Harrison portrayed Milligan as a traitor and argued that his actions prolonged the war. Milligan refused to admit his affiliation or actions with a seditious organization. Hendricks focused on Milligan's "malicious prosecution and false imprisonment." The jury's verdict in Milligan's favor was issued on May 30, 1871. Although Milligan sought thousands of dollars in damages, state and federal statutes limited the claim to five dollars plus court costs.

In 1880 Milligan became a member of the Republican Party, and in his later years supported Garfield's campaign for president. Milligan retired from his law practice in 1893.

== Death and legacy ==
Milligan died of natural causes at his son's home in Huntington County, Indiana, on December 21, 1899, thirty-three years after the U.S. Supreme Court ruling in the case that bore his name.

Ex parte Milligan became well known as the leading U.S. Supreme Court case that found the president went beyond his legal powers to suppress dissenters during the American Civil War. The decision also helped to establish the tradition that presidential and military action "based on war" had limits.

== See also ==
- Copperheads
- David Davis
- habeas corpus
- Sons of Liberty
- Unitary executive theory
