= Copperhead (politics) =

19th-century United States political faction

Copperhead Democrats
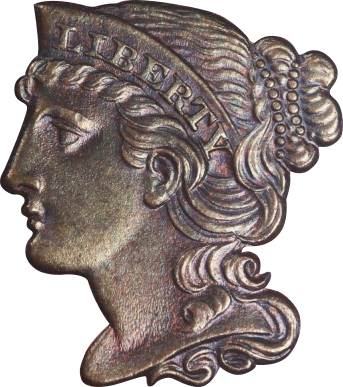
- Historical leaders: Clement Vallandigham; Alexander Long
- Founded: 1860
- Dissolved: 1868
- Ideology: Anti-abolitionism; Anti-Civil War; Jacksonianism
- National affiliation: Democratic Party

In the 1860s, the Peace Democrats, also known as Copperheads, were a faction of the Democratic Party in the North who opposed the American Civil War and wanted an immediate peace settlement with the Confederates. Republicans started labeling anti-war Democrats "Copperheads" after the eastern copperhead (Agkistrodon contortrix), a species of venomous snake. Those Democrats embraced the moniker, reinterpreting the copper "head" as the likeness of Liberty, which they cut from Liberty Head large cent coins and proudly wore as badges. By contrast, Democratic supporters of the war were called War Democrats. Notable Copperheads included two Democratic Congressmen from Ohio: Reps. Clement L. Vallandigham and Alexander Long. Republican prosecutors accused some prominent Copperheads of treason in a series of trials in 1864.

Copperheadism was a highly contentious grassroots movement. It had its strongest base just north of the Ohio River and in some urban ethnic wards in large cities. In the state of Ohio, perhaps in contrast with Indiana and Illinois, the counties that had Peace Democrat majorities tended not to be along the Ohio River, but more in the central and northwestern portions of the state.

Historians such as Wood Gray, Jennifer Weber, and Kenneth M. Stampp have argued that it represented a traditionalistic element alarmed at the rapid modernization of society sponsored by the Republican Party and that it looked back to Jacksonian democracy for inspiration. Weber argues that the Copperheads damaged the Union war effort by opposing conscription, encouraging desertion, and forming conspiracies. Still, other historians say that the draft was already in disrepute and that the Republicans greatly exaggerated the conspiracies for partisan reasons.

Historians such as Gray and Weber argue that the Copperheads were inflexibly rooted in the past and were naive about the refusal of the Confederates to return to the Union. Convinced that the Republicans were ruining the traditional world they loved, they were obstructionist partisans. In turn, the Copperheads became a significant target of the National Union Party in the 1864 presidential election, when they were used to discredit the leading Democratic candidates. Copperhead support increased when Union armies did poorly and decreased when they won great victories. After the fall of Atlanta in September 1864, Union military success seemed assured, and Copperheadism collapsed.

== Name ==
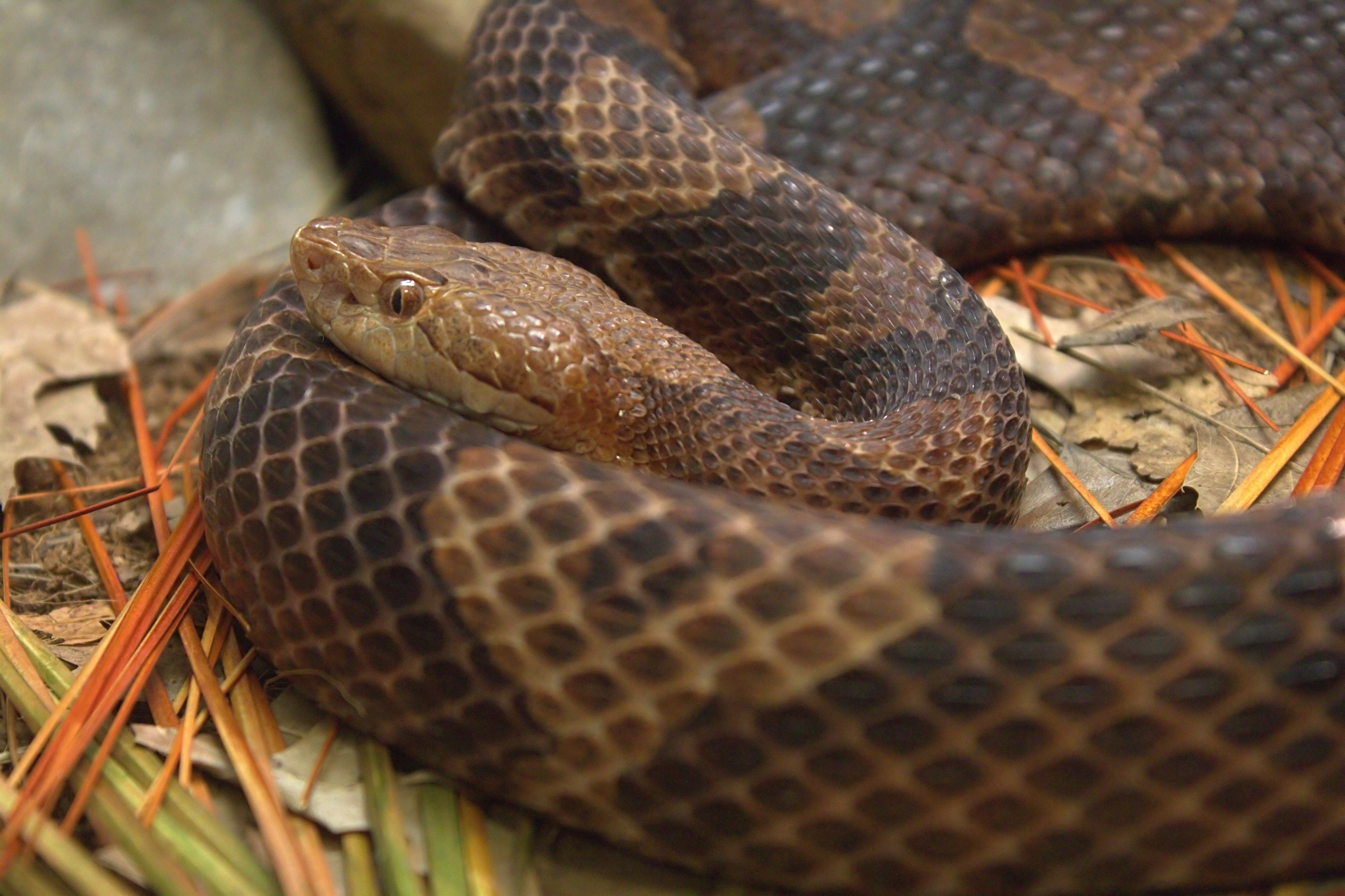
The Eastern copperhead snake is venomous and has coloration well-adapted for camouflage

A possible origin of the name came from a New York Times newspaper account in April 1861 that stated that when postal officers in Washington, D.C., opened a mail bag from a state now in the Confederacy:

A day or two since, when one of the mail-bags coming from the South by way of Alexandria, was emptied in the court-yard of the Post-office, a box fell out and was broken open, – from which two copperheads, one four and a half and the other three feet long, crawled out. The larger one was benumbed and easily killed; the other was very lively and venomous and was dispatched with some difficulty and danger. What are we to think of a people who resort to such weapons of warfare.

== Agenda ==
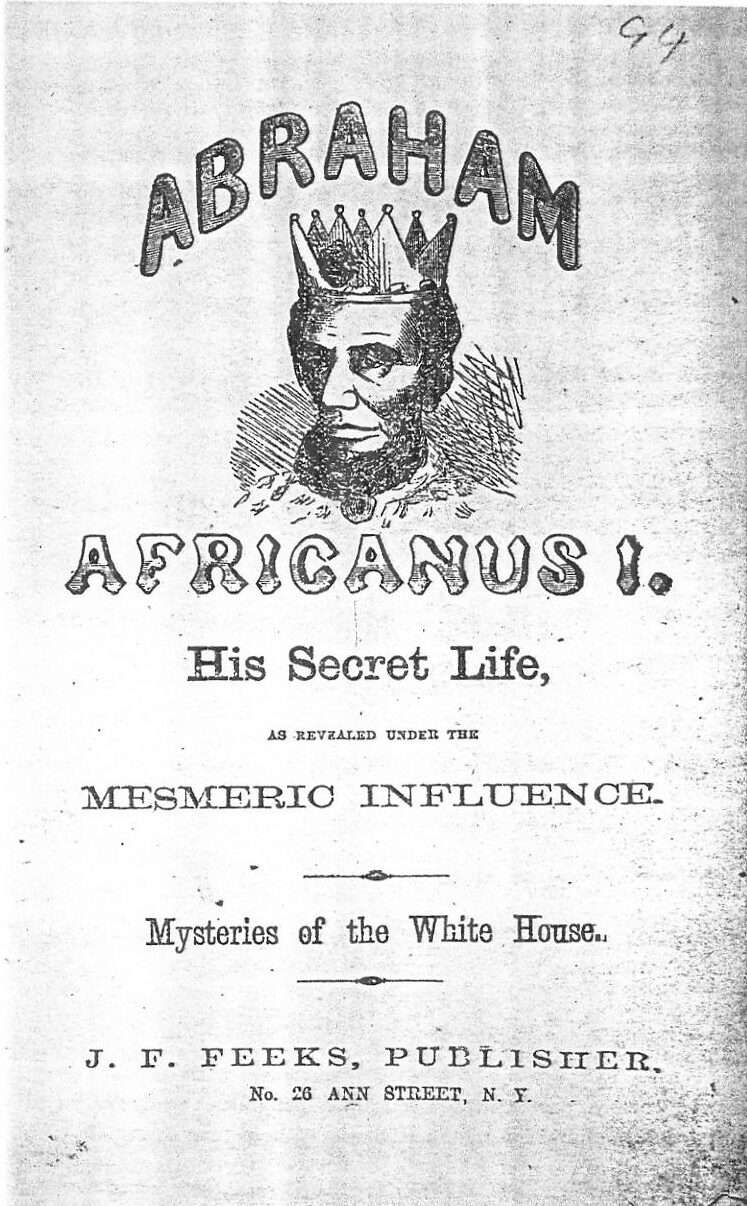
Copperhead pamphlet from 1864 by Charles Chauncey Burr, a magazine editor from New York City

During the American Civil War (1861–1865), the Copperheads nominally favored the Union and strongly opposed the war, for which they blamed abolitionists. They demanded immediate peace and resisted draft laws. They wanted President Abraham Lincoln and the Republicans ousted from power, seeing the President as a tyrant destroying American republican values with despotic and arbitrary actions.

Some Copperheads tried to persuade Union soldiers to desert. They talked of helping Confederate prisoners of war seize their camps and escape. They sometimes met with Confederate agents and took money. The Confederacy encouraged their activities whenever possible.

== Newspapers ==
The Copperheads had numerous important newspapers, but the editors never allied. In Chicago, Wilbur F. Storey made the Chicago Times into Lincoln's most vituperative enemy. The New York Journal of Commerce, originally abolitionist, was sold to owners who became Copperheads, giving them an important voice in the nation's largest city. A typical editor was Edward G. Roddy, owner of the Uniontown, Pennsylvania Genius of Liberty. He was an intensely partisan Democrat who saw African Americans as an inferior race and Lincoln as a despot and dunce. Although he supported the war effort in 1861, he blamed abolitionists for prolonging the war and denounced the government as increasingly despotic. By 1864, he was calling for peace at any price.

John Mullaly's Metropolitan Record was the official Catholic newspaper in New York City. Reflecting Irish American opinion, it supported the war until 1863 before becoming a Copperhead organization. In the spring and summer of 1863, the paper urged its Irish working-class readers to pursue armed resistance to the draft passed by Congress earlier in the year. When the draft began in the city, working-class European Americans, largely Irish, responded with violent riots from July 13 to 16, lynching, beating and hacking to death more than 100 black New Yorkers and burning down black-owned businesses and institutions, including the Colored Orphan Asylum, an orphanage for 233 black children. On August 19, 1864, John Mullaly was arrested for inciting resistance to the draft.

Even in an era of extremely partisan journalism, Copperhead newspapers were noted for their angry rhetoric. Wisconsin newspaper editor Marcus M. Pomeroy of the La Crosse Democrat referred to Lincoln as "Fungus from the corrupt womb of bigotry and fanaticism" and a "worse tyrant and more inhuman butcher than has existed since the days of Nero ... The man who votes for Lincoln now is a traitor and murderer ... And if he is elected to misgovern for another four years, we trust some bold hand will pierce his heart with dagger point for the public good".

== Copperhead resistance ==
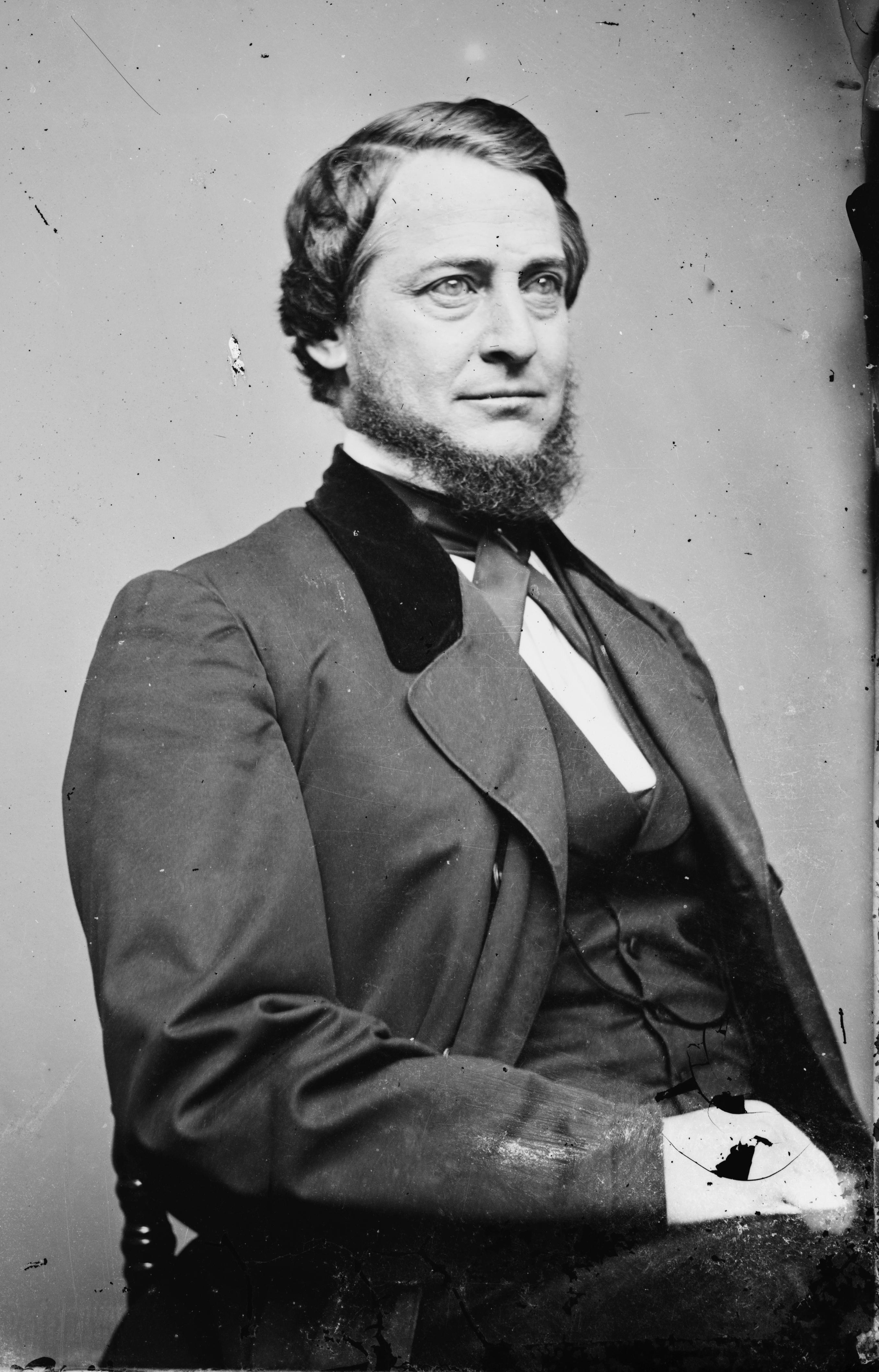
Clement Vallandigham, leader of the Copperheads, coined the slogan: "To maintain the Constitution as it is, and to restore the Union as it was."

The Copperheads sometimes talked of violent resistance and, in some cases, started to organize. However, they never actually made an organized attack. As war opponents, Copperheads were suspected of disloyalty, and their leaders were sometimes arrested and held for months in military prisons without trial. One notable example was General Ambrose Burnside's 1863 General Order Number 38, issued in Ohio, which made it an offense (to be tried in military court) to criticize the war in any way. The order was used to arrest Ohio congressman Clement L. Vallandigham when he criticized the order itself, and, on May 1, 1863, declared that the war was being fought not to save the Union but to free enslaved blacks. He was court-martialed by the Army and sentenced to imprisonment, but Lincoln commuted the sentence to banishment behind Confederate lines.

The Democrats nevertheless nominated Vallandingham for governor of Ohio in 1863. He left the Confederacy and went to Canada, where he campaigned for governor but lost after an intense battle.

Vallandingham operated behind the scenes at the 1864 Democratic convention in Chicago. The convention adopted a largely Copperhead platform and selected Ohio Representative George Pendleton, a Peace Democrat, as the vice-presidential candidate. However, it chose a pro-war presidential candidate, General George B. McClellan. The contradiction severely weakened the party's chances to defeat Lincoln.

Probably the largest Copperhead group was the Knights of the Golden Circle. Formed in Ohio in the 1850s, it became politicized in 1861. It reorganized as the Order of American Knights in 1863 and again in early 1864 as the Order of the Sons of Liberty, with Vallandigham as its commander. One leader, Harrison H. Dodd, advocated the violent overthrow of the governments of Indiana, Illinois, Kentucky, Tennessee, and Missouri in 1864. Democratic Party leaders and a Federal investigation thwarted his "Northwest Conspiracy".

Despite this Copperhead setback, tensions remained high. These tensions would contribute to physical altercations between Copperheads, Republicans, and Union soldiers in Illinois towns such as Paris, Mattoon, and ultimately in Charleston. The Charleston Riot took place on March 28th, 1864 and ended with six Union soldiers and two Copperheads dead. This event drew the attention of President Lincoln, and became national news.

Indiana Republicans then used the sensational revelation of an antiwar Copperhead conspiracy by elements of the Sons of Liberty to discredit Democrats in the 1864 House elections. The military trial of Lambdin P. Milligan and other Sons of Liberty revealed plans to set free the Confederate prisoners held in the state. The culprits were sentenced to hang, but the Supreme Court intervened in Ex parte Milligan, saying they should have received civilian trials.

== Characteristics ==
The values of the Copperheads reflected the Jacksonian democracy of an earlier agrarian society. The Copperhead movement attracted Southerners who had settled north of the Ohio River, and the poor and merchants who had lost profitable Southern trade. They were most numerous in border areas, including southern parts of Ohio, Illinois, and Indiana (in Missouri, comparable groups were avowed Confederates).

The movement had scattered bases of support outside the lower Midwest. A Copperhead element in Connecticut dominated the Democratic Party there. The Copperhead coalition included many Irish American Catholics in eastern cities, mill towns and mining camps (especially in the Pennsylvania coal fields). They were also numerous in German Catholic areas of the Midwest, especially Wisconsin.

Historian Kenneth Stampp has captured the Copperhead spirit in his depiction of Congressman Daniel W. Voorhees of Indiana:

There was an earthy quality in Voorhees, "the tall sycamore of the Wabash." On the stump his hot temper, passionate partisanship, and stirring eloquence made an irresistible appeal to the western Democracy (i.e. the Democratic Party). His bitter cries against protective tariffs and national banks, his intense race prejudice, his suspicion of the eastern Yankee, his devotion to personal liberty, his defense of the Constitution and State's rights faithfully reflected the views of his constituents. Like other Jacksonian agrarians, he resented the political and economic revolution then in progress. Voorhees idealized a way of life that he thought was being destroyed by the current rulers of his country. His bold protests against these dangerous trends made him the idol of the Democracy of the Wabash Valley.

== Historiography ==
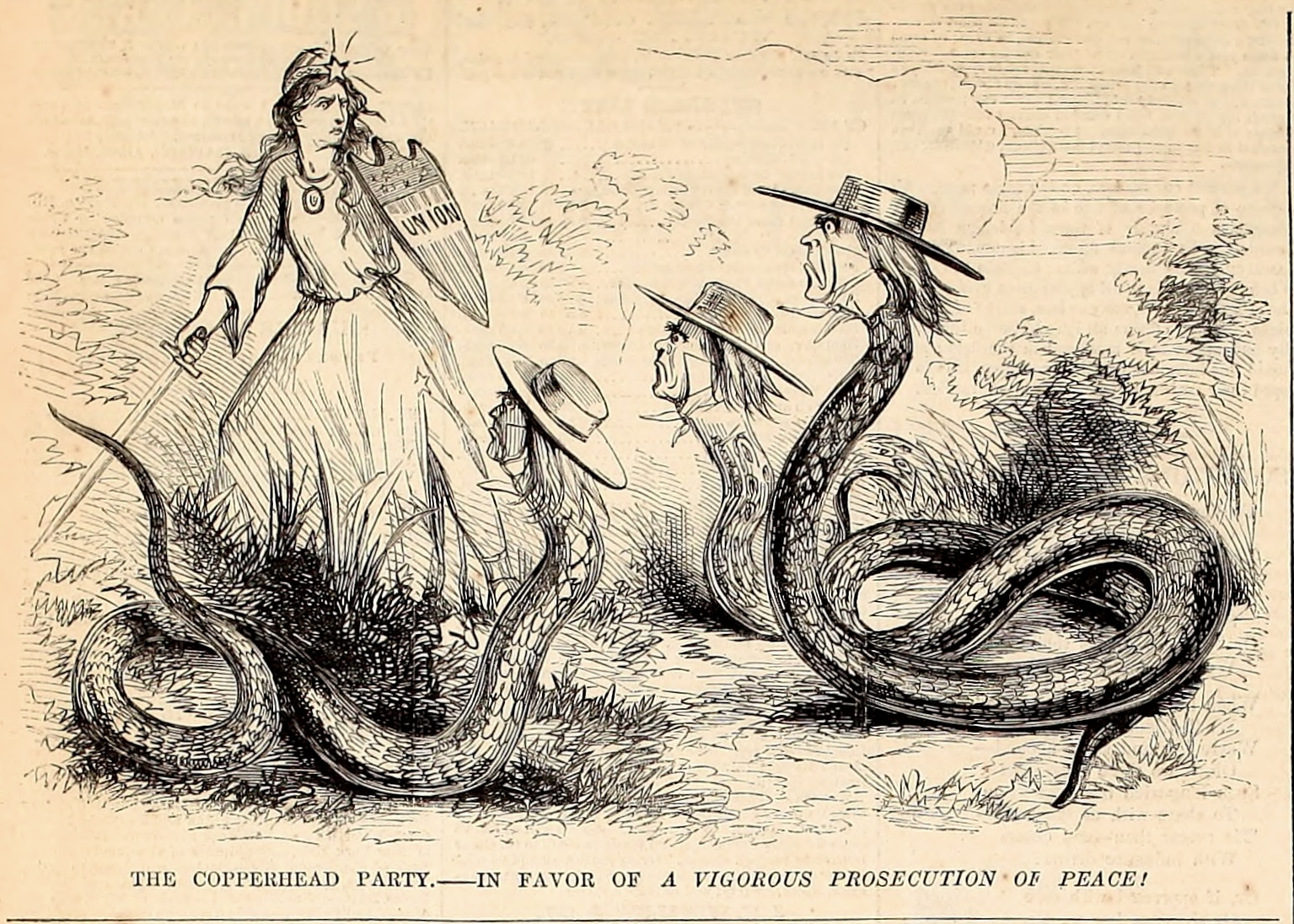
"The Copperhead Party—in Favor of a Vigorous Prosecution of Peace!", cartoon by Thomas Nast, in the Harper's Weekly, February 28, 1863

Two central questions have run through the historiography of the Copperheads: "How serious a threat did they pose to the Union war effort and hence to the nation's survival?" and "To what extent and with what justification did the Lincoln administration and other Republican officials violate civil liberties to contain the perceived menace?"

The first book-length scholarly treatment of the Copperheads was The Hidden Civil War: The Story of the Copperheads (1942) by Wood Gray. In it, Gray decried the "defeatism" of the Copperheads and argued that they deliberately served the Confederacy's war aims. Also in 1942, George Fort Milton published Abraham Lincoln and the Fifth Column, which likewise condemned the traitorous Copperheads and praised Lincoln as a model defender of democracy.

Gilbert R. Tredway, a professor of history, in his 1973 study Democratic Opposition to the Lincoln Administration in Indiana found most Indiana Democrats were loyal to the Union and desired national reunification. He documented Democratic counties in Indiana having outperformed Republican counties in recruiting soldiers. Tredway found that Copperhead sentiment was uncommon among the rank-and-file Democrats in Indiana.

The chief historians who look more favorably on the Copperheads are Richard O. Curry and Frank L. Klement. Klement devoted most of his career to debunking the idea that the Copperheads represented a danger to the Union. Klement and Curry have downplayed the treasonable activities of the Copperheads, arguing the Copperheads were traditionalists who fiercely resisted modernization and wanted to return to the old ways. Klement argued in the 1950s that the Copperheads' activities, especially their supposed participation in treasonous anti-Union secret societies, were mostly false inventions by Republican propaganda machines designed to discredit the Democrats at election time. Curry sees Copperheads as poor traditionalists battling against the railroads, banks, and modernization. In his standard history Battle Cry of Freedom (1988), James M. McPherson asserted Klement had taken "revision a bit too far. There was some real fire under that smokescreen of Republican propaganda".

Jennifer Weber's Copperheads: The Rise and Fall of Lincoln's Opponents in the North (2006) agrees more with Gray and Milton than with Klement. She argues that first, Northern antiwar sentiment was strong, so strong that Peace Democrats came close to seizing control of their party in mid-1864. Second, she shows the peace sentiment led to deep divisions and occasional violence across the North. Third, Weber concluded that the peace movement deliberately weakened the Union military effort by undermining both enlistment and the operation of the draft. Indeed, Lincoln had to divert combat troops to retake control of New York City from the anti-draft rioters in 1863. Fourth, Weber shows how the attitudes of Union soldiers affected partisan battles back home. The soldiers' rejection of Copperheadism and overwhelming support for Lincoln's reelection in 1864 was decisive in securing the Northern victory and the preservation of the Union. The Copperheads' appeal, she argues, waxed and waned with Union failures and successes in the field.

== Flags ==
There was no official flag for Copperheads: they differed from area to area. Most contemporary accounts indicate some flags had a white field with the inscription "peace" and "nation." Others were the standard national flag with 13 to 22 stars and 11-7 stripes known as "exclusionary flags". They mostly removed the stars of rebel states or Union states. The flags were also popular with the opposition Some retained their 34 stars but put political slogans in their stripes.

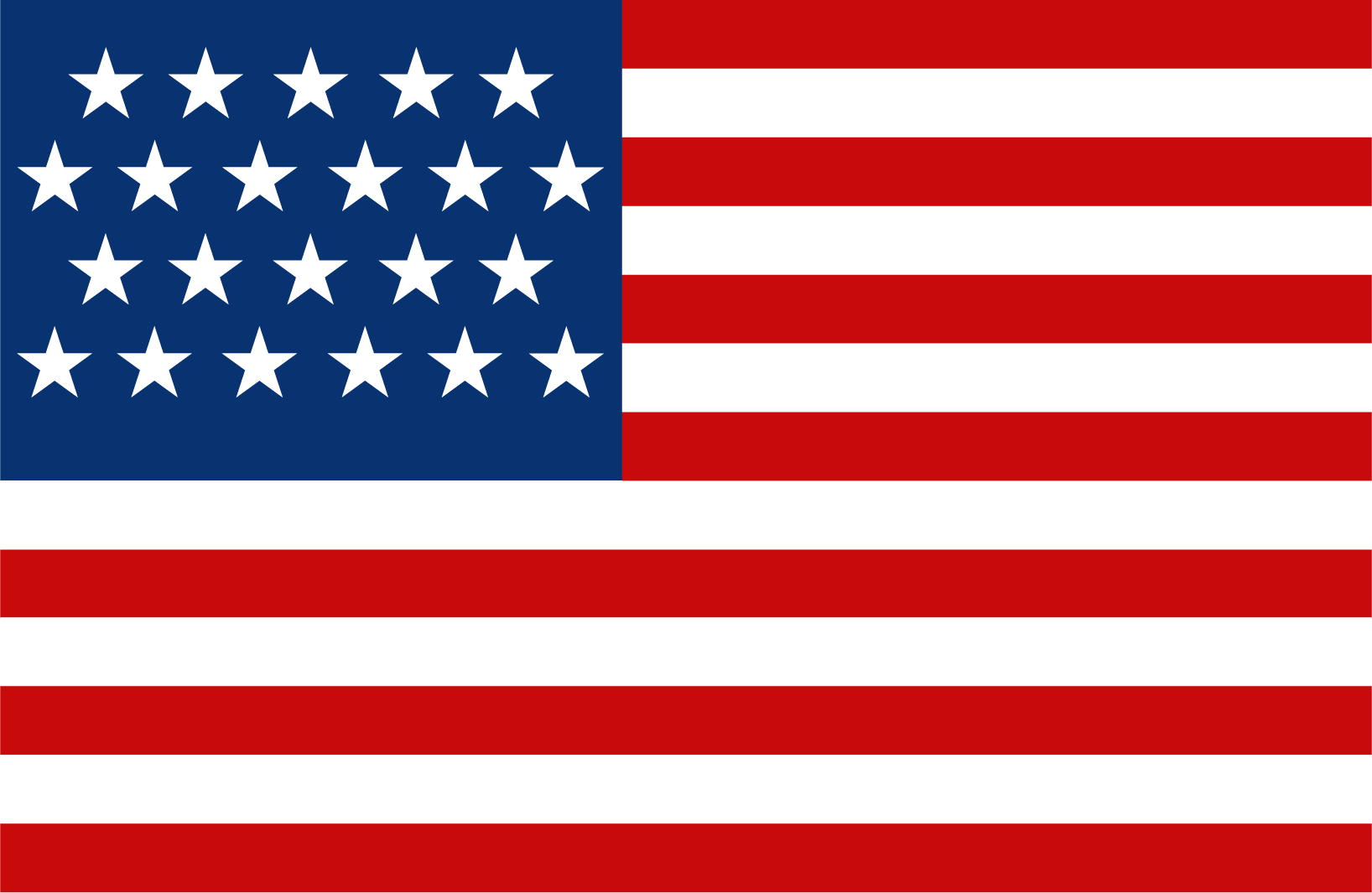
Digital reconstruction of a 22 star "exclusionary" American flag raised by Peace Democrats in San Francisco, California in 1864

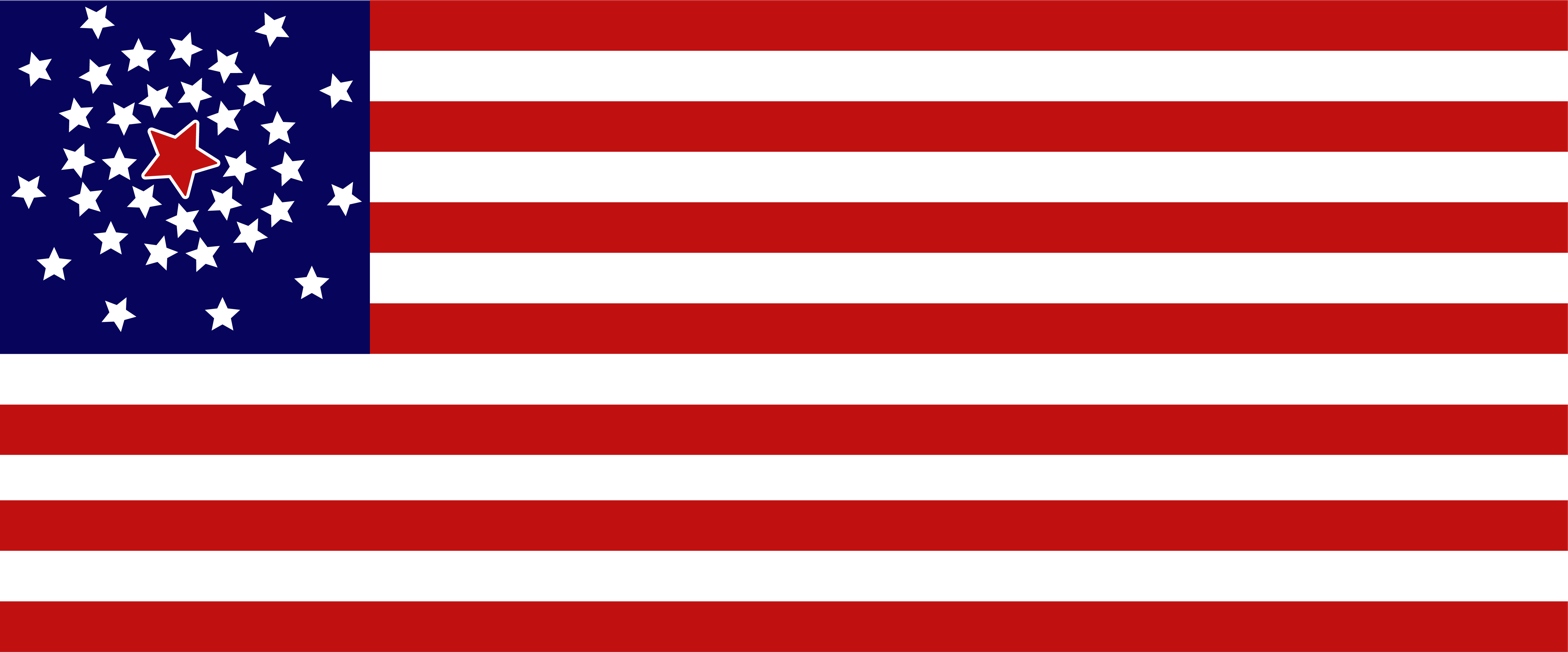
Digital remake of flag flown in Brookfield, Connecticut by local copperheads

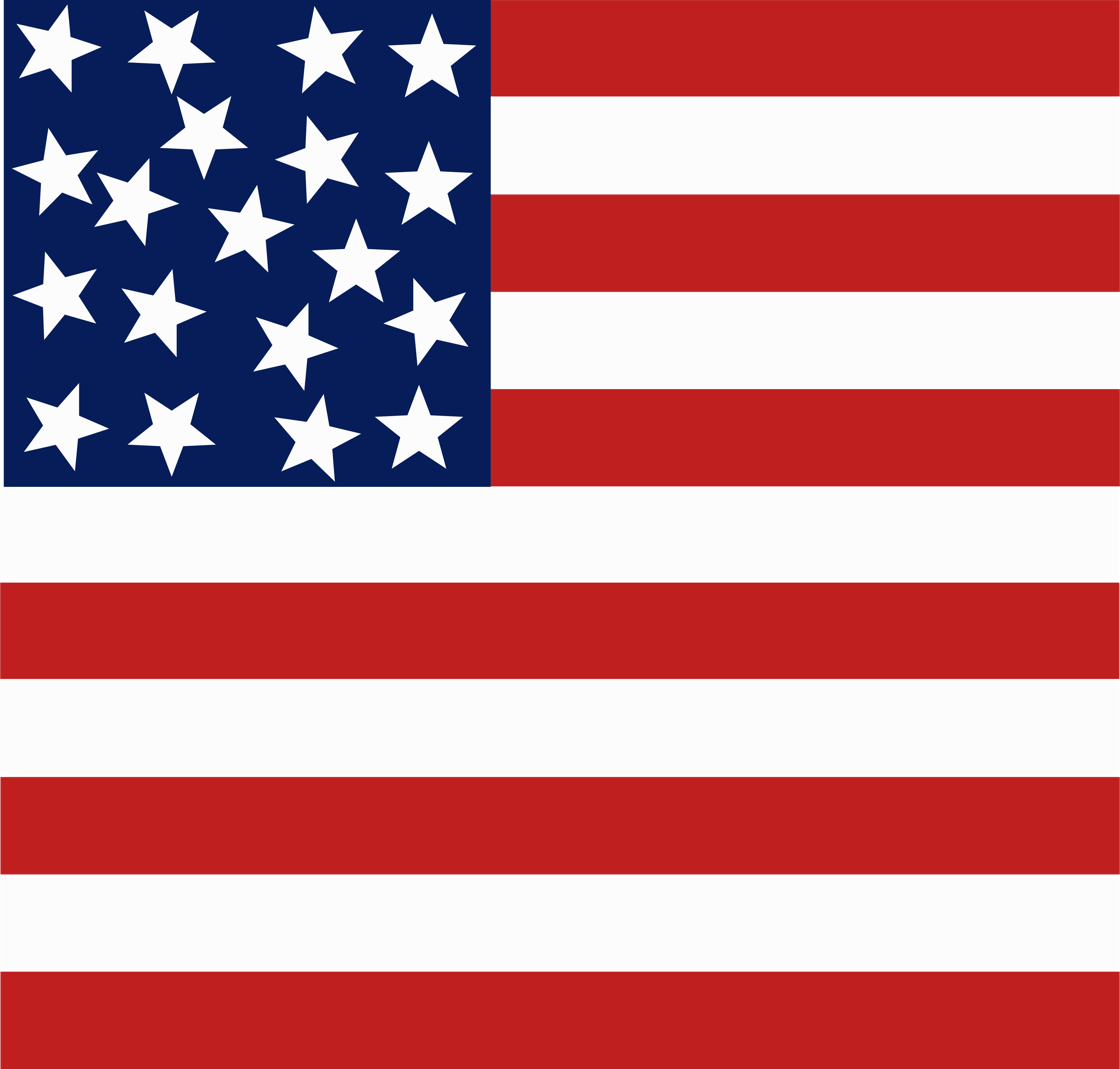
Digital remake of a flag flown by a Copperhead. The 11 stripes for the 9 states + 2 border states that were loyal to the Confederacy. The 19 stars for Indiana where it was made

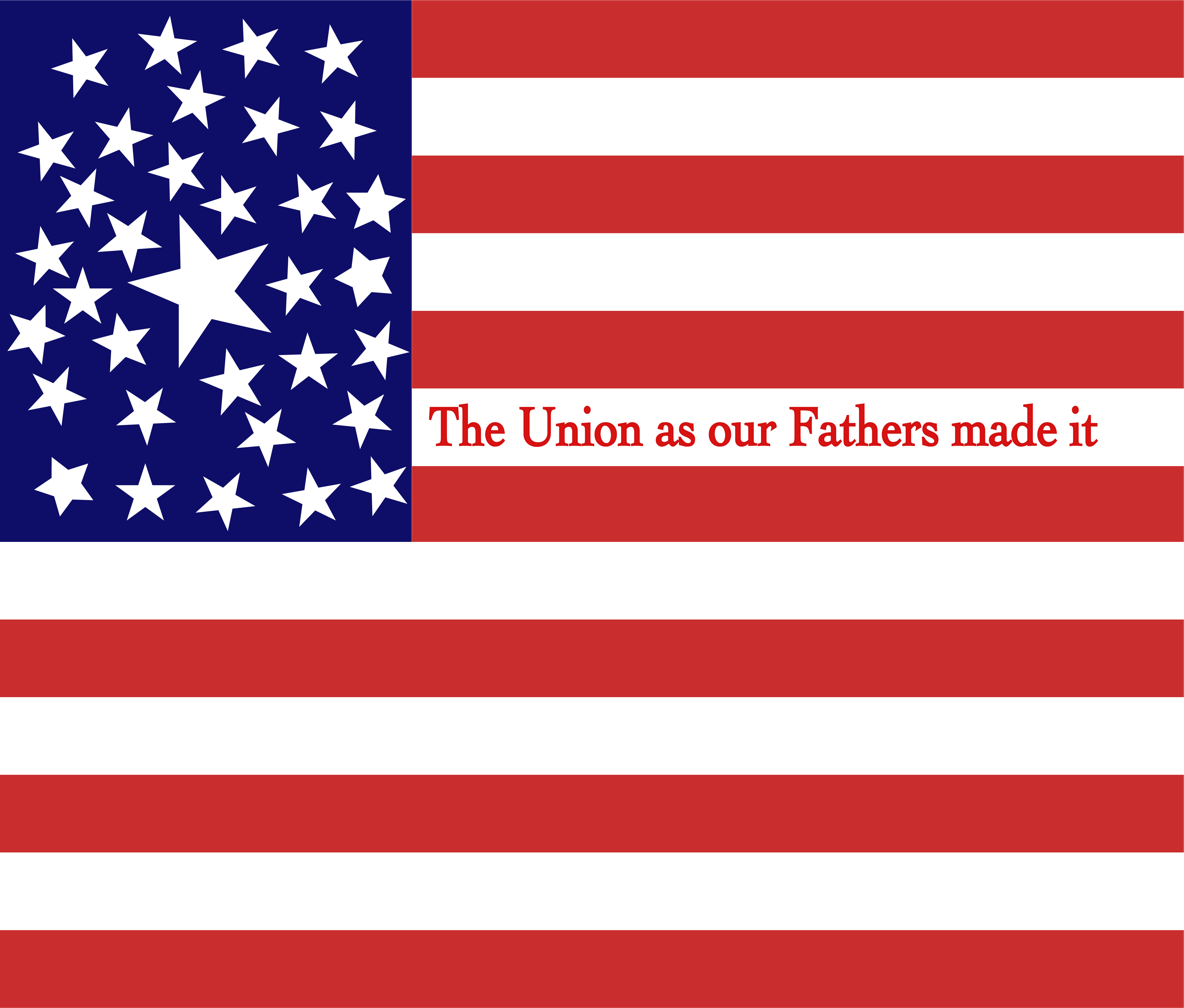
Digital remake of a flag with Clement Vallandigham's slogan

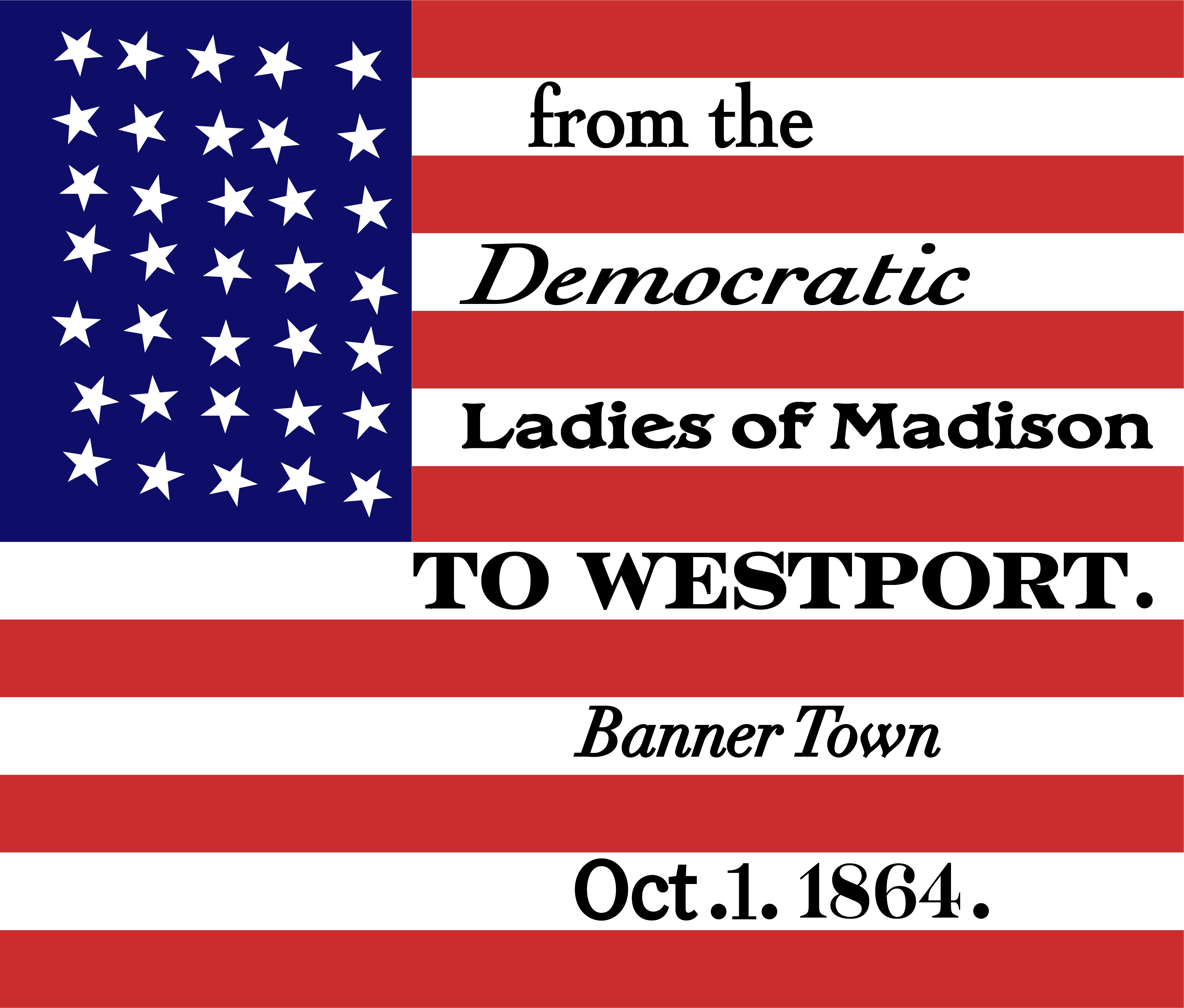
Digital remake of the flag given to the Democratic Party of Westport, Wisconsin

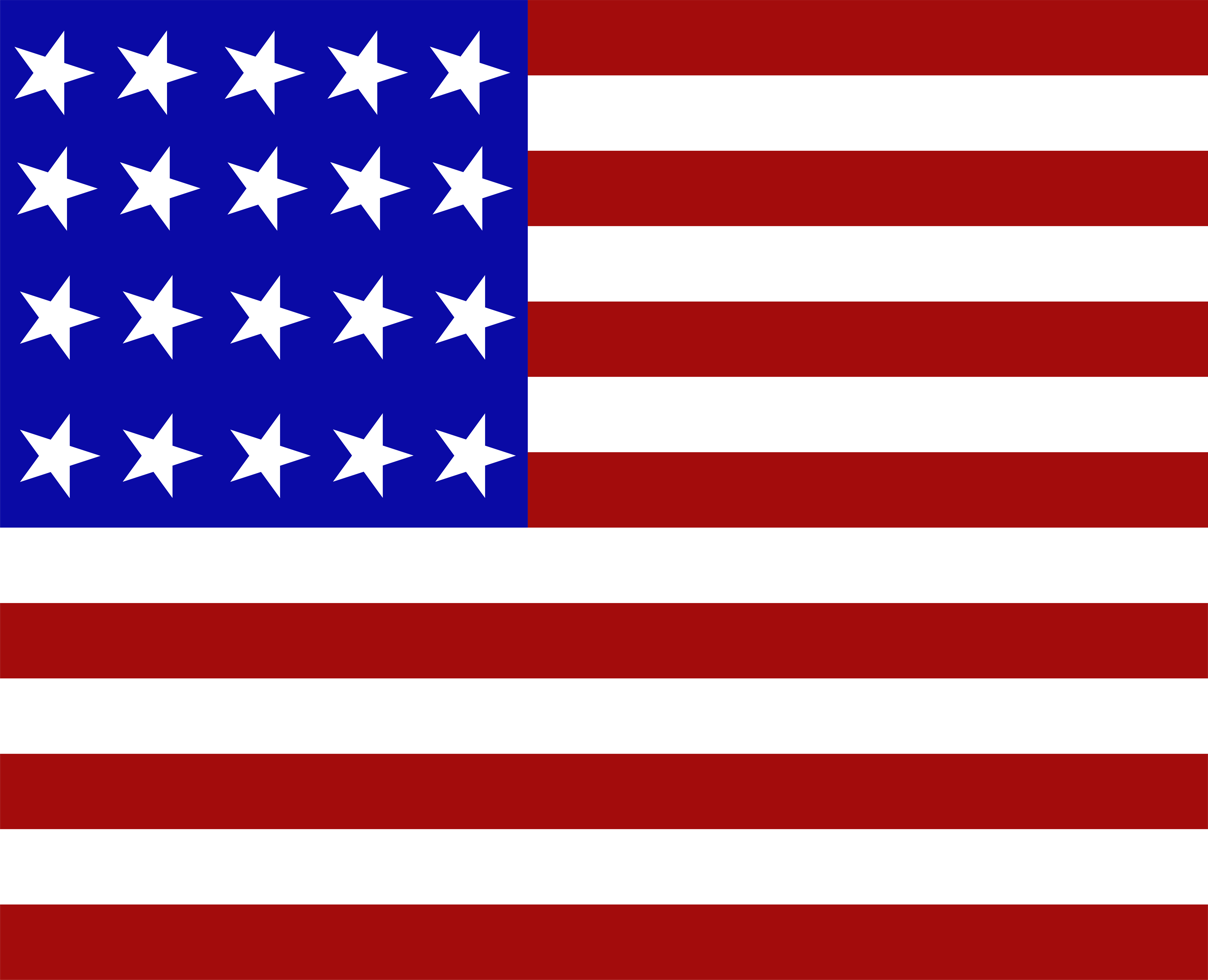
Digital Reconstruction of 24 star flag flown by Copperheads in Los Angeles, California on June 1, 1861

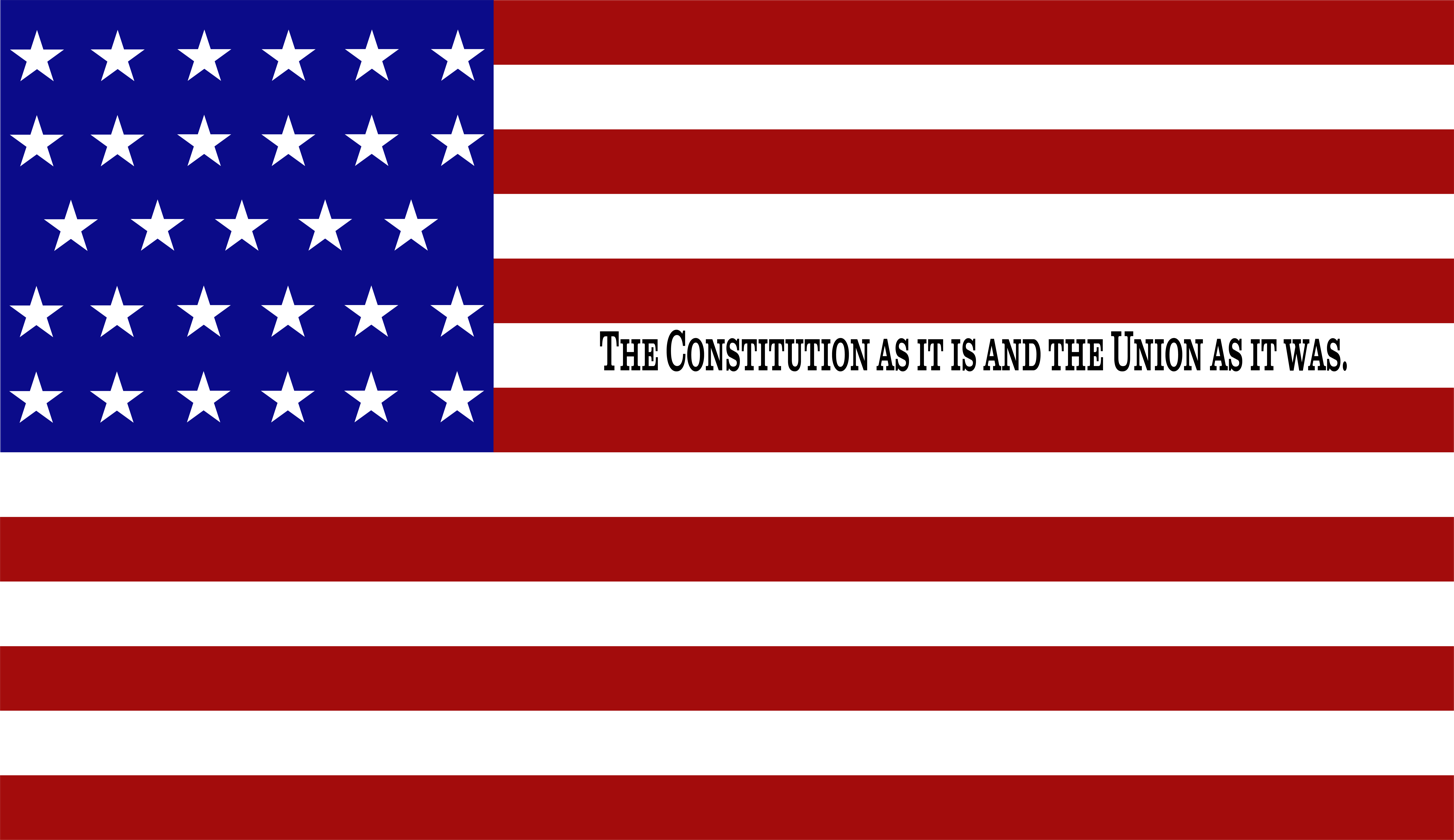
Digital Reconstruction of a flag flown 1862 with a popular copperhead slogan

== Notable Copperhead Democrats ==
- Leon Abbett of New Jersey
- William Allen of Ohio
- William Allen of Ohio
- William Bigler of Pennsylvania
- William A. Bowles of Indiana
- Jesse D. Bright of Indiana
- James Brooks of New York
- Charles R. Buckalew of Pennsylvania
- C. Chauncey Burr of New York
- James Campbell of Pennsylvania
- Sanford E. Church of New York
- William Taylor Davidson of Illinois
- John G. Davis of Indiana
- Henry C. Dean of Iowa
- Harrison H. Dodd of Indiana
- Ira Allen Eastman of New Hampshire
- William W. Eaton of Connecticut
- John R. Eden of Illinois
- Joseph K. Edgerton of Indiana
- Charles A. Eldredge of Wisconsin
- Thomas D. English of New Jersey
- Benjamin G. Harris of Maryland
- Carter Harrison III of Illinois
- Andrew Humphreys of Indiana
- Anthony L. Knapp of Illinois
- John Law of Indiana
- Alexander Long of Ohio
- Nathan Lord of Maine
- George Lunt of Massachusetts
- Dennis Mahony of Iowa
- Charles Mason of Iowa
- Samuel Medary of Ohio
- Lambdin P. Milligan of Indiana
- Julius Sterling Morton of Nebraska
- Elijah H. Norton of Missouri
- Edson B. Olds of Ohio
- George Pendleton of Ohio
- Marcus M. Pomeroy of Wisconsin
- Thomas G. Pratt of Maryland
- Rodman M. Price of New Jersey
- George E. Pugh of Ohio
- William B. Reed of Pennsylvania
- John Reynolds of Illinois
- James C. Robinson of Illinois
- Lewis Winans Ross of Illinois
- Thomas H. Seymour of Connecticut
- George K. Shiel of Oregon
- Wilbur F. Storey of Illinois
- William Temple of Delaware
- Allen G. Thurman of Ohio
- Isaac Toucey of Connecticut
- Allen Trimble of Ohio
- Clement Vallandigham of Ohio
- Daniel W. Voorhees of Indiana
- James W. Wall of New Jersey
- William A. Wallace of Pennsylvania
- Chilton A. White of Ohio
- Joseph W. White of Ohio
- Benjamin Wood of New York
- Fernando Wood of New York
- George W. Woodward of Pennsylvania
- William Wright of New Jersey

== See also ==
- American election campaigns in the 19th century
- Andrew Johnson
- Bourbon Democrat
- Butternut (people)
- Copperhead (2013 film)
- Doughface
- Fifth column
- Opposition to the American Civil War
- Red Strings
- Southern Unionists
