= Mason C. Darling =

19th century American politician, Wisconsin pioneer

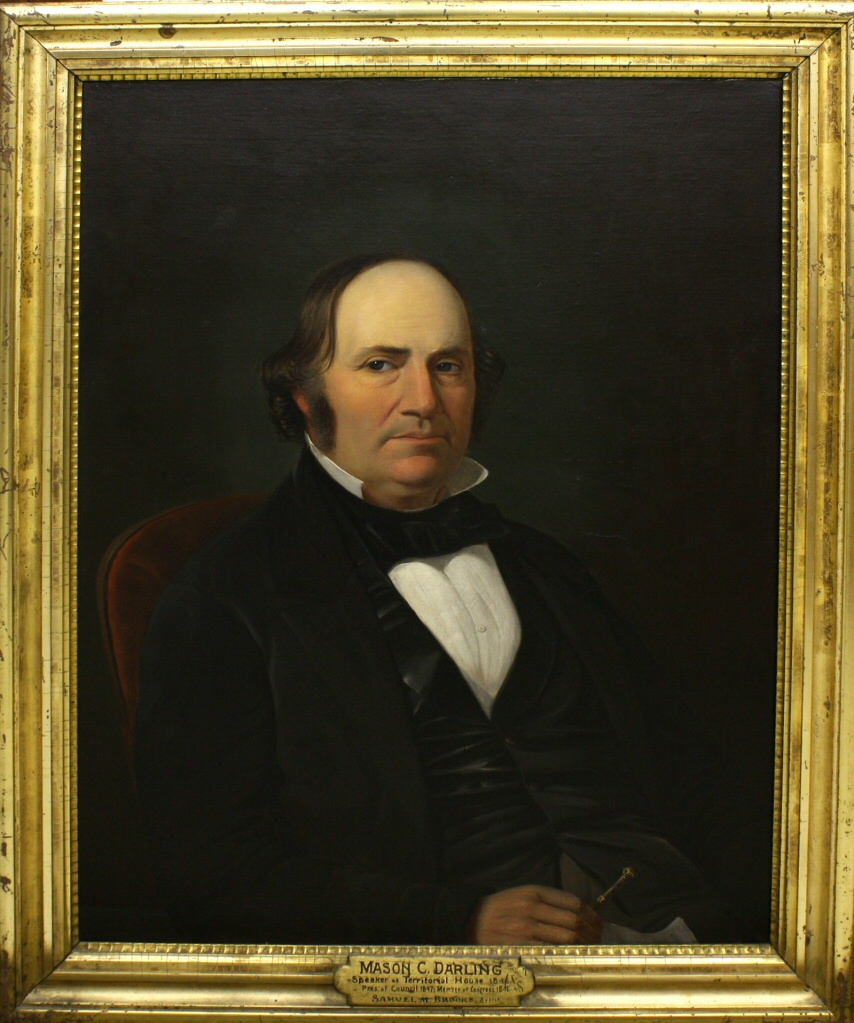

1st & 4th Mayor of Fond du Lac, Wisconsin
- In office April 1856 – April 1857
- Preceded by: Isaac Brown
- Succeeded by: Dexter E. Hoskins
- In office April 6, 1852 – April 1853
- Preceded by: Position Established
- Succeeded by: George McWilliams

Member of the U.S. House of Representatives from Wisconsin's 2nd district
- In office June 9, 1848 – March 3, 1849
- Preceded by: Position Established
- Succeeded by: Orsamus Cole

11th Speaker of the House of Representatives of the Wisconsin Territory
- In office January 5, 1846 – January 4, 1847
- Preceded by: George H. Walker
- Succeeded by: William Shew

Member of the Council of the Wisconsin Territory from the Northeast district (Note: Brown, Calumet, Columbia, Fond du Lac, Manitowoc, Marquette, Portage, and Winnebago counties)
- In office January 4, 1847 – June 5, 1848
- Preceded by: Randall Wilcox
- Succeeded by: Position abolished

Member of the House of Representatives of the Wisconsin Territory from the Northeast district (Note: Brown, Calumet, Fond du Lac, Manitowoc, Marquette, Portage, Sheboygan, and Winnebago counties)
- In office November 2, 1840 – January 4, 1847
House terms
In office January 6, 1845 – January 4, 1847 Serving with Abraham Brawley, William Fowler (1845), & Elisha Morrow (1846)
Succeeded by	Hugh McFarlane & Elisha Morrow
Constituency	Brown, Calumet, Fond du Lac, Manitowoc, Marquette, Portage, Sheboygan, & Winnebago counties
In office November 7, 1842 – January 6, 1845 Serving with Albert Gallatin Ellis & David Agry
Constituency	Brown, Calumet, Fond du Lac, Manitowoc, Marquette, Portage, Sheboygan, & Winnebago counties
In office November 2, 1840 – November 7, 1842 Serving with Albert Gallatin Ellis & David Giddings
Preceded by	Ebenezer Childs, Barlow Shackleford, Charles C. Sholes, & Jacob W. Conroe
Constituency	Brown, Fond du Lac, Manitowoc, Portage, & Sheboygan counties

Member of the Massachusetts House of Representatives from the Greenwich district
- In office 1834–1835

Personal details
- Born: May 18, 1801 Amherst, Massachusetts, U.S.
- Died: March 12, 1866 (aged 64) Chicago, Illinois, U.S.
- Resting place: Rienzi Cemetery, Fond du Lac, Wisconsin
- Party: Democratic
- Spouse: Naomi Ingram (m. 1823–1866)
- Children: Keyes Armstrong Darling^{(b. 1824; died adult)}; Helen Mar (Eastman)^{(b. 1827; died 1891)}; Lewis Mason Darling^{(b. 1830; died 1860)}
- Relatives: John A. Eastman (son-in-law)
- Education: Berkshire Medical College
- Profession: Physician

Mason Cook Darling (May 18, 1801 – March 12, 1866) was an American medical doctor, Democratic politician, and Wisconsin pioneer. He was one of the earliest American settlers at Fond du Lac, Wisconsin, and was elected as a member of Wisconsin's first delegation to the U.S. House of Representatives after achieving statehood (1848–1849). After Congress, he served as the 1st and 4th mayor of Fond du Lac.

Before Wisconsin's statehood, Darling also served in the territorial legislature through nearly the entire Wisconsin Territory era, and before emigrating to the Wisconsin Territory, he served one year in the Massachusetts House of Representatives, representing the town of Greenwich, Massachusetts.

== Background ==
Born in Amherst, Massachusetts, Darling attended the public schools. He taught school in the state of New York. He then studied medicine, graduating from the Berkshire Medical College in 1824. After this he practiced medicine for thirteen years. He moved to Wisconsin Territory in 1837 and was one of the original settlers at Fond du Lac in 1838.

== Public office ==
Mason served in the Massachusetts House of Representatives from the town of Greenwich in Hampshire County, Massachusetts, in 1834 prior to moving to Wisconsin Territory. He served as member of the Territorial legislative assembly 1840–1846, and as member of the Territorial Council in 1847 and 1848. Upon the admission of Wisconsin as a State into the Union, Darling was elected as a Democrat to the Thirtieth Congress. He represented Wisconsin's newly created 2nd congressional district and served from June 9, 1848, to March 3, 1849. He was not a candidate for renomination in 1848 to the Thirty-first Congress, and was succeeded by Orasmus Cole, a Whig. He was elected the first mayor of Fond du Lac in 1852.

While active in politics, Darling also founded Fond du Lac Lodge 26 Freemasons in 1849, and served as its first master.

== Later years ==
He resumed the practice of medicine and was a dealer in real estate at Fond du Lac until 1864, when he moved to Chicago, moving with his daughter and her husband.

He died in Chicago on March 12, 1866, and was interred at Rienzi Cemetery in Fond du Lac, Wisconsin.

He is the namesake of the street "Darling Place" in Fond du Lac.

== Personal life and family ==
Mason Cook Darling was one of five known children of Benjamin Darling and his second wife, Selina (née Cook). The Darling family were descendants of the English colonist George Darling, who emigrated to the Massachusetts Bay Colony in the 1600s. On his mother's side, his family were descendants of Walter Cooke, who also emigrated to the Massachusetts Bay Colony in the 1600s.

On July 15, 1823, Mason Darling married Naomi Ingram at Shutesbury, Massachusetts; they had three known children. Their only known daughter, Helen, married John A. Eastman, another prominent Wisconsin pioneer.

== Electoral history ==
=== U.S. House of Representatives (1848) ===
Wisconsin's 2nd Congressional District Special Election, 1848
Party	Candidate	Votes	%	±%
Special Election, May 8, 1848
Democratic	Mason C. Darling	9,683	58.62%	
Whig	Alexander L. Collins	6,836	41.38%	
Plurality		2,847	17.23%	
Total votes		16,519	100.0%	
Democratic win (new seat)				

== See also ==
- List of mayors of Fond du Lac, Wisconsin

== Notes ==
U.S. House of Representatives
State established	Member of the U.S. House of Representatives from Wisconsin's 2nd congressional district June 9, 1848 – March 3, 1849	Succeeded by Orsamus Cole
Political offices
City incorporated	Mayor of Fond du Lac, Wisconsin; 1852 – 1853	Succeeded by George McWilliams
Preceded by Isaac Brown	Mayor of Fond du Lac, Wisconsin; 1856 – 1857	Succeeded by Dexter E. Hoskins
