= Isaac Brown (Wisconsin pioneer) =

19th century American politician

Member of the Wisconsin State Assembly from the Fond du Lac 3rd district
- In office January 7, 1856 – January 5, 1857
- Preceded by: William H. Ebbets
- Succeeded by: John B. Wilbor

3rd Mayor of Fond du Lac, Wisconsin
- In office April 1854 – April 1855
- Preceded by: George McWilliams
- Succeeded by: Mason C. Darling

Chairman of the Board of Supervisors of Fond du Lac County, Wisconsin
- In office April 1852 – April 1853
- Preceded by: William Starr
- Succeeded by: N. M. Donaldson

Treasurer of Fond du Lac County, Wisconsin Territory
- In office January 1845 – January 1848
- Preceded by: Benjamin Franklin Moore
- Succeeded by: Kirkland Gillet

Personal details
- Born: June 4, 1811 Chenango County, New York, U.S.
- Died: 1883 (aged 71–72) Maryland, U.S.
- Party: Democratic
- Spouse: Lydia Arnold
- Children: Edwin Arnold Brown; (b. 1832; died 1862)

Isaac Brown (June 4, 1811 – 1883) was an American construction contractor, Democratic politician, and Wisconsin pioneer. He was the 3rd mayor of Fond du Lac, Wisconsin, and represented central Fond du Lac County in the Wisconsin State Assembly during the 1856 term.

His former home, the Fond du Lac Octagon House, is listed in the National Register of Historic Places.

== Biography ==
Isaac Brown was born in Chenango County, New York, in 1811. He came west to the Wisconsin Territory in the early 1840s, settling in what is now Fond du Lac, Wisconsin. Shortly after arriving in the territory, he was selected to serve as court clerk at the first term of the United States district court held at Fond du Lac in 1844. Later that year, he was elected county treasurer, serving three years in office. During those years, he also became one of the most prominent builders in Fond du Lac, winning a contract from the county board to construct the first county courthouse.

When Fond du Lac was incorporated as a village in 1847, Brown was elected to the village's first board of trustees. He was subsequently elected village president in 1851. The following year, he was elected chairman of the county board of supervisors.

After Fond du Lac was incorporated as a city, Brown was elected the city's 3rd mayor in 1854. Throughout the 1850s, he was also active as a member of the local school board and was responsible for several school constructions.

In 1855, Brown was elected to the Wisconsin State Assembly, running on the Democratic Party ticket. He served in the 9th Wisconsin Legislature, representing Fond du Lac County's 3rd Assembly district, which then comprised the city of Fond du Lac and central Fond du Lac County.

== Personal life and legacy ==
Isaac Brown was one of at least 12 children born to Thomas Brown and his wife Nancy (née Frink).

Isaac Brown married Lydia Arnold. Their son, Edwin Arnold Brown, served as a Union Army officer in the American Civil War. He joined up with fellow Fond du Lac pioneer Edward S. Bragg in the volunteer company that became Company E of the 6th Wisconsin Infantry Regiment. Bragg was the initial captain of the company, and Brown was his first lieutenant. After Bragg was promoted to major in the fall of 1861, Brown became captain of the company. He led the company through the Second Battle of Bull Run, where their brigade was nicknamed the Iron Brigade. Edwin Brown was killed in the early hours of the Battle of Antietam when a shell fell directly into the ranks of the regiment.

Today, Isaac Brown is best known for his former home in Fond du Lac. Referred to as the Fond du Lac Octagon House, it was built for Brown in 1856. The home still exists at 276 Linden Street in Fond du Lac, and is now listed on the National Register of Historic Places.

Wisconsin State Assembly
Preceded by William H. Ebbets	Member of the Wisconsin State Assembly from the Fond du Lac 3rd district January 7, 1856 – January 5, 1857	Succeeded by John B. Wilbor
Political offices
Preceded by Benjamin Franklin Moore	Treasurer of Fond du Lac County, Wisconsin Territory; January 1845 – January 1848	Succeeded by Kirkland Gillet
Preceded by William Starr	Chairman of the Board of Supervisors of Fond du Lac County, Wisconsin; April 1852 – April 1853	Succeeded by N. M. Donaldson
Preceded by George McWilliams	Mayor of Fond du Lac, Wisconsin; April 1854 – April 1855	Succeeded by Mason C. Darling
