= Wood Gray =

American historian (1905–1977)

Wood Gray (March 19, 1905 - June 27, 1977) was a history professor at George Washington University, public speaker, and writer. He specialized in American social history and the history of the American Civil War. He was a consultant for the United States Information Agency working on histories and motion pictures for overseas distribution. He gave talks at the Foreign Service Institute and Industrial College. The George Washington University Libraries have a collection of his papers.

He was born in Petersburg, Illinois, and graduated from Petersburg Harris High School as valedictorian and captain of the track team. He received a B.A. from the University of Illinois in 1927 and an M.A. in 1928. A student manager for the school's football team, he recounted taping Red Grange's ankles before the game against Michigan in which Grange scored five touchdowns. Gray earned a Ph.D. from the University of Chicago in 1933.

He began teaching history at George Washington University in 1934 and became department chair in 1937. He served in the Army Air Corps as a Special Staff Lt. Colonel from 1943 until 1946.

In 1965 he was a member of NASA's historical advisory committee.

He wrote about the Copperheads of the American Civil War era who he described as peace at any price Democrats.

== Personal life ==
He married Dorothea Leal Gray (died 1978) on August 13, 1927. He died in Washington, D.C.

== Bibliography ==
- Historian's Handbook: A Key to the Study and Writing of History (1951) a textbook
- The Hidden Civil War: The Story of the Copperheads (1942)
- Essays in American Historiography, co-authored with Marcus W. Jernegan of (1937)
- The George Washington Key to Historical Research (1956) with William Columbus Davis et al.
