= William A. Bowles =

American medical doctor (1799–1873)

William Augustus Bowles
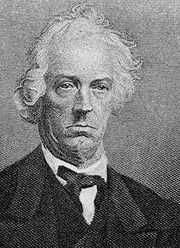
- Born: 1799; Frederick, Maryland, U.S.
- Died: 28 March 1873 (aged 73/74); French Lick, Indiana, U.S.
- Occupations: Doctor, Politician

William Augustus Bowles (1799 – March 28, 1873) was a medical doctor, landowner, and politician from French Lick, Indiana. He is best remembered for establishing the first French Lick Springs Hotel, a mineral springs resort hotel in the 1840s, and platting the town of French Lick, Indiana, in 1857. Bowles, a Democrat, served two terms in the Indiana state legislature (1838 to 1840 and 1843). During the Mexican–American War he became a colonel in the 2nd Indiana Volunteer Regiment and joined in the Battle of Buena Vista (1847). An outspoken advocate of slavery as an institution, Bowles was sympathetic to the South during the American Civil War. In 1863 Harrison H. Dodd, leader of the Order of Sons of Liberty (OSL) in Indiana, named Bowles a major general for one of four military districts in the state's secret society that opposed the war. Bowles also played a role in the Indianapolis treason trials in 1864, when he and three others were convicted of plotting to overthrow the federal government. Following his release from prison in 1866, Bowles returned to Orange County, Indiana, where his failing health continued to decline in the years prior to his death.

Bowles was a co-defendant in a controversial trial by a military commission that convened on October 21, 1864, at Indianapolis, that led to the U.S. Supreme Court decision in 1866 in what became known as Ex parte Milligan. Bowles was sentenced to hang, but President Andrew Johnson authorized a commutation of sentence to life imprisonment on May 30, 1865. The landmark U.S. Supreme Court case found that the trial in Indianapolis by the military commission was unconstitutional because the civilian courts were still in operation. The military commission had no jurisdiction to try and sentence the men in this instance, and as a result, the accused were entitled to discharge. Bowles was released from prison in 1866.

== Early life and education ==
William Augustus Bowles was born in Maryland in 1799 to Isaac Bowles and Mary Bagford Bowles. He was the first of their ten children. Isaac, who was of English ancestry, moved the family to Rockbridge County, Virginia, and Eaton, Ohio, before relocating to Indiana in 1818. Little is known of William's early education; it is not known where he received his medical training to become a physician.

== Marriage and family ==
Bowles was married three times, with the first two marriages ending in divorce. Little is known of his first marriage. Bowles's second wife was Eliza Carlin, a native of Louisiana, whom he married in 1845. The couple had one daughter. In 1868 Eliza sued William for divorce, charging him of "improper conduct," and she was awarded $25,000 (~$604,688 in 2025) in alimony, payable in installments. Bowles failed to make the payments. Alimony payments, accumulated interest, and other fees amounting to nearly $40,000 was taken from his estate following his death and paid to Eliza's estate. In 1872, the year before his death, Bowles married Julia Albee, a widow from Orange County, Indiana. The couple had no children.

== Early career ==
In 1829 Bowles and his brother, Thomas Carrington Bowles (Jan. 24, 1806 – Aug. 16, 1840) came to Orange County from Washington County, Indiana. After it was determined that the mineral springs were not saline enough to make it practical for state-sponsored salt mining at French Lick, the acreage was sold at public action. In 1832 the Bowles brothers bought lands totaling almost 1,500 acres that included the salt springs at French Lick from the state government. Thomas assigned his ownership of the property to his brother and returned to Washington County, Indiana. William continued to live in Orange County, residing at Paoli, Indiana. He did not immediately develop his lands at French Lick.

As a young man, Bowles became a minister in the Baptist church in what is now known as West Baden, Indiana, but he was expelled after quarreling with its members. Bowles, a Democrat, was also active in local politics, and served two terms in the Indiana state legislature, from 1838 to 1840 and in 1843.

In the 1840s Bowles became the first person to build and operate a resort lodge at the French Lick mineral springs. He also began to sell the mineral spring water, which was later dubbed "Pluto Water." (The large spring at French Lick was named "Pluto's Well" in 1869.) Although the exact date of the first hotel's construction is unknown, by the mid-1840s Bowles had built a wood-framed hotel (80 to 100 feet long and three stories high) to accommodate visitors.

Around 1846 John A. Lane secured a five-year lease from Bowles for the property at French Lick Springs, and subsequently earned enough from the enterprise to purchase 770 acres at nearby Mile Lick, named for its location about a mile from French Lick. (Lane later changed the name of Mile Lick to West Baden.) Lane built the first hotel at West Baden, Indiana, beginning a long-standing rivalry between Bowles's hotel at French Lick and Lane's establishment at West Baden. The original hotels are no longer extant, but resort hotels continue to operate at both locations, slightly more than a mile apart.

=== Military service ===
In 1846 Bowles was one of several men who helped organize a local militia company to fight in the Mexican–American War, the result of federal legislation such as the Wilmot Proviso. His company was assigned to the 2nd Indiana Volunteer Regiment. Bowles was elected as a colonel in the regiment on August 28, 1846, and received a commission in the U.S. Army at Brazo Santiago, Texas, on July 31.

On February 23, 1847, Bowles and the 2nd Indiana joined in the Battle of Buena Vista. Afterwards, it was learned that Bowles had ordered a sudden and unexpected retreat during the battle, disgracing his regiment and nearly causing the army's defeat. After the battle, Jefferson Davis, the future president of the Confederate States of America, complimented Bowles and a few of his men, who did service in Davis's regiment following the retreat. The result was a lifelong friendship between the two men. Although General Joseph Lane preferred charges against Bowles, General Zachary Taylor refused to order a court martial. However, a court of inquiry considered accusations made against Bowles for "incompetency," ignorance of proper military tactics, "misbehavior," and cowardice. The court cleared Bowles of the charges of cowardice as the regimental leader, but military reports found he did "manifest want of capacity and judgment as its commander."

=== Businessman and community founder ===
After the completion of his military service, Bowles returned to Paoli, and the management of the hotel he had built at French Lick, but not without challenges and successes. In 1849 Bowles was indicted for practicing medicine without a license, but was not convicted. On May 2, 1857, Bowles platted the town of French Lick, in Orange County, Indiana. It included seventy-seven lots and a public space for a school and other needs of the township.

== Anti-war Democrat ==
Bowles, a talkative and outspoken advocate of slavery as an institution, was a peace Democrat who was sympathetic to the South during the American Civil War. In 1858 Bowles was convicted of bringing seven slaves into Indiana, in violation of the state's constitution. He was fined $40 (~$1,433 in 2025) and ordered to take them out of Indiana. On February 15, 1861, at a public gathering in French Lick, Bowles was one of several local citizens who introduced resolutions in opposition to war with the South. Later, he challenged county residents to a public debate regarding the right to own slaves.

During the 1850s and early 1860s Bowles organized local groups and recruited membership in the Knights of the Golden Circle (KGC), a secret society that supported the expansion of slavery into new territories. In 1863 Harrison H. Dodd, "grand commander" of the Order of Sons of Liberty (OSL) in Indiana, named Bowles a major general for one of the four military districts in the secret society that opposed the war. It is believed that the OSL was either an offshoot of, or a front group for, the KGC, in a continuation and/or restructuring of other groups that were founded about 1834. The OSL, an anti-Union paramilitary secret society, began operating about 1854 and continued to operate under various names for several years after the war. Scholars have also argued the highly touted military/paramilitary capabilities of the OSL were exaggerated and existed "more in Dodd's mind" than in reality.

On June 18, 1863, a group of Confederate soldiers under the command of Thomas Hines, a Confederate cavalryman and spy, crossed the Ohio River and rode to Paoli and French Lick. Hines met with Bowles, whose home was a gathering place for the Democratic Party, to inquire if Bowles could offer any support for John Hunt Morgan's upcoming raid into Indiana. Bowles told Hines he could raise a force of 10,000 to aid the raiders, but before the deal was finalized Hines was told that Union troops were approaching, forcing him to flee. As a result, there would be no support for Morgan's Raid from Bowles or his associates. The incident caused Indiana governor Oliver P. Morton to harshly treat anyone in Indiana who was publicly sympathetic to the Confederate cause.

=== Treason trial ===
On September 17, 1864, General Alvin Peterson Hovey, commander of the military district of Indiana, authorized a military commission to meet on September 19 at Indianapolis to begin trials of Dodd and others placed under military arrest. Bowles, who had been arrested earlier in the summer at his home, was imprisoned at the Federal Building in Indianapolis, where he was accused as one of Dodd's co-conspirators. Bowles became one the defendants in the Indianapolis treason trials held before the military commission. Besides Dodd and Bowles, among the other men accused of treason were Democrats Lambdin P. Milligan, a lawyer living in Huntington, Indiana; Andrew Humphreys of Greene County, Indiana; and Stephen Horsey of Martin County, Indiana. Dodd, who was the first to be tried, escaped from jail before his trial was completed, and fled to Canada. On October 10, 1864, he was found guilty, convicted in absentia, and sentenced to hang. Charges against several others were dismissed and they were released before the beginning of the proceedings involving Bowles.

The military commission for the trial of Bowles, Milligan, Horsey, and Humphreys convened at Indianapolis on October 21, 1864, to consider five charges against the men: conspiracy against the U.S. government; offering aid and comfort to the Confederates; inciting insurrections; "disloyal practices"; and "violation of the laws of war." Bowles and his co-defendants were alleged to have established a secret organization that planned to liberate Confederates from Union prisoner-of-war camps in Illinois, Indiana, and Ohio; seize an arsenal to provide the freed prisoners with arms; raise an armed force to incite a general insurrection; join with the Confederates to invade Indiana, Illinois; and make war on the U.S. government. Amid bitter disputes between Democrats and Republicans concerning the conduct of the war, the Democrats charged that the arrests and trials were politically motivated. Scholars who have studied the trials have proposed that they were prompted by partisan politics, convened before commission of biased military officers, failed to follow the rules of evidence, and used questionable informers as witnesses.

The commission's decision on December 10, 1864, found the men guilty on all charges. Bowles, Milligan, and Horsey were sentenced to hang on May 19, 1865; Humphreys was found guilty and sentenced to hard labor for the remainder of the war. The sentence for Humphreys was soon modified, allowing his release, but he was required to remain within two specific townships in Greene County, Indiana, and could not participate in any acts that opposed the war. Efforts were made to secure pardons for Bowles, Milligan, and Horsey, with the decision passing to President Andrew Johnson following Abraham Lincoln's assassination. On May 16, 1865, three days before their execution, the executions of Bowles and Milligan were postponed to June 2, and Horsey's sentenced was commuted to life imprisonment. President Andrew Johnson commuted the sentences for Bowles and Milligan to life imprisonment on May 30, 1865.

In the interim, petitions from Milligan and the other co-conspirators for a review of the controversial proceedings passed through the federal circuit court in Indiana. Two judges, David Davis and Thomas Drummond, disagreed over the issue of whether the U.S. Constitution prohibited civilians from being tried by a military commission and passed the case to the U.S. Supreme Court, where it became known as Ex parte Milligan.

=== Ex parte Milligan (1866) ===
The U. S. Supreme Court case, Ex parte Milligan or Ex parte Lambdin P. Milligan, 71 U.S. (4 Wall.) 2 (1866); 18 L. Ed. 281., was argued before the Court on March 5 and March 13, 1866. Chief Justice Salmon P. Chase handed down the court's decision on April 3, 1866, ruling the application of military tribunals to citizens when civilian courts are still operating is unconstitutional. The Court's ruling decreed that a writ of habeas corpus could be issued based on the congressional act of March 3, 1863; the military commission had no jurisdiction to try and sentence the men; and the accused were entitled to discharge. Bowles, Milligan, and Horsey were released from prison at Columbus, Ohio, on April 12, 1866.

On December 17, 1866, during the Court's next session, Justice Davis delivered the majority opinion. The Court held that the civil courts were still operating in Indiana during the time that Bowles and the others were arrested, tried, and convicted by the military commission. Under the U.S. Constitution, the accused had a right when charged with a crime, to be tried and punished according to the law, including security against unreasonable search and seizure, a warrant for probable cause before arrest, and if indicted, a speedy trial by jury. The Ex part Milligan holding set a precedent that has never been reversed or set aside.

== Later years ==
Following his release from prison, Bowles returned to Orange County, Indiana, where his health deteriorated. Illness confined Bowles to his home in his later years. Bowles died on March 28, 1873, at his home at French Lick, in the presence of his third wife, Julia. For a number of years Bowles's body remained in a stone vault within sight of his home. His remains were removed to Ames Chapel Cemetery at Paoli, about five miles away, where Julia was buried. Bowles was remembered in his obituary as one of the county's early citizens and "one of the best physicians in Southern Indiana."

Prior his trial and incarceration in 1864, Bowles had leased the French Lick Springs hotel to Doctor Samuel Ryan. In 1880 Bowles's hotel property was sold at a sheriff's auction to Hiram E. Wells and James M. Andrews of Paoli to satisfy a legal judgment against Bowles's estate.

== See also ==
- Copperheads
