= William Hiner =

19th century American politician

President pro tempore of the Wisconsin Senate
- In office January 10, 1877 – January 7, 1878
- Preceded by: Robert L. D. Potter
- Succeeded by: Levi W. Barden

Member of the Wisconsin Senate from the 18th district
- In office January 1, 1872 – January 7, 1878
- Preceded by: Samuel D. Burchard
- Succeeded by: Alonzo A. Loper

14th Mayor of Fond du Lac, Wisconsin
- In office April 1867 – April 1868
- Preceded by: James Sawyer
- Succeeded by: C. J. L. Meyer
- In office October 1865 – April 1866
- Preceded by: Jared M. Taylor
- Succeeded by: James Sawyer

Personal details
- Born: December 16, 1821 Bedford, Pennsylvania, U.S.
- Died: April 29, 1880 (aged 58) Fond du Lac, Wisconsin, U.S.
- Resting place: Rienzi Cemetery, Fond du Lac
- Party: Republican
- Spouses: Sarah Jane Fisher (died 1868); Mary Landon (died 1918)

William Henry Hiner (December 16, 1821 – April 29, 1880) was an American manufacturing businessman, and Republican politician, and Wisconsin pioneer. He was the 14th mayor of Fond du Lac, Wisconsin, and represented Fond du Lac County for six years in the Wisconsin State Senate. He also served as president pro tempore of the Senate during the 1877 session.

== Biography ==
Born in Bedford, Pennsylvania, he moved to Fond du Lac, Wisconsin in 1850. He was one of the owners of the Union Iron Works in Fond du Lac. He served on the Fond du Lac County, Wisconsin Board of Supervisors and on the Fond du Lac Common Council. Hiner also served as mayor of Fond du Lac. From 1872 until 1879, he served in the Wisconsin State Senate, as a Republican, and also served as President pro tem of the Wisconsin Senate. He died in Fond du Lac, Wisconsin, in 1880.

== See also ==
- List of mayors of Fond du Lac, Wisconsin

Wisconsin Senate
Preceded by Samuel D. Burchard	Member of the Wisconsin Senate from the 18th district January 1, 1872 – January 7, 1878	Succeeded by Alonzo A. Loper
Preceded by Robert L. D. Potter	President pro tempore of the Wisconsin Senate; January 10, 1877 – January 7, 1878	Succeeded by Levi W. Barden
Political offices
Preceded by Jared M. Taylor	Mayor of Fond du Lac, Wisconsin; October 1865 – April 1866	Succeeded by James Sawyer
Preceded by James Sawyer	Mayor of Fond du Lac, Wisconsin; April 1867 – April 1868	Succeeded by C. J. L. Meyer
