= List of mayors of Fond du Lac, Wisconsin =

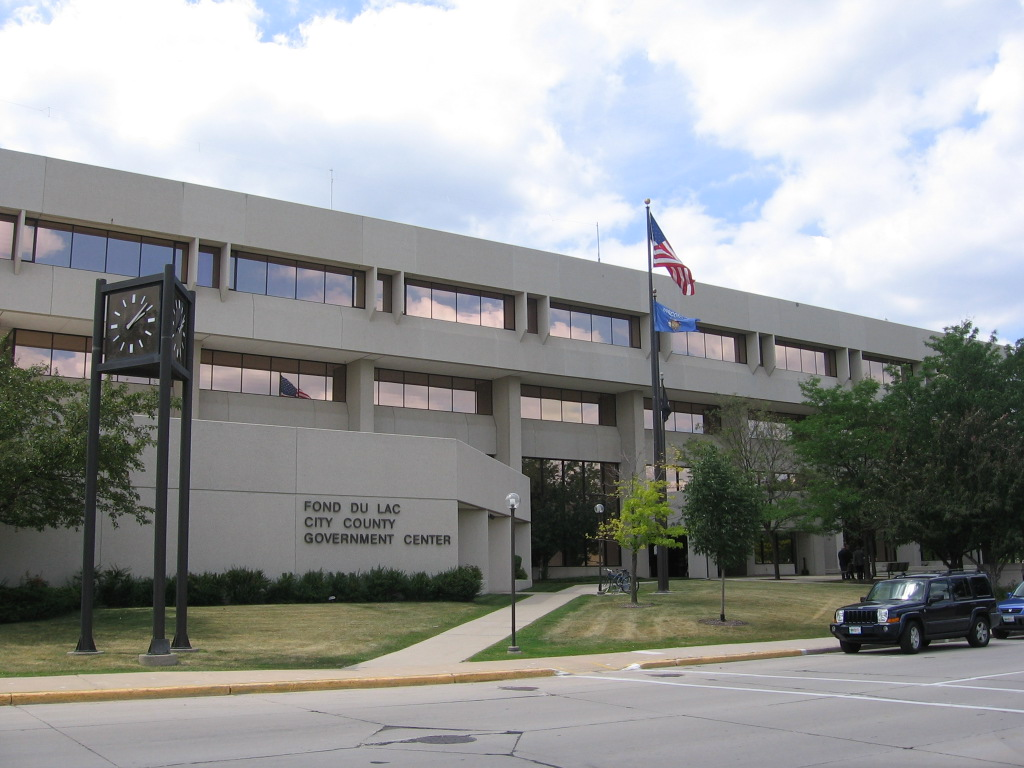
Fond du Lac City/County Government Center building in 2009

This is a list of mayors of Fond du Lac, Wisconsin, USA. Fond du Lac was originally incorporated as a village in 1847 before Wisconsin statehood. Fond du Lac was re-incorporated as a city in 1852. In 1915, Fond du Lac switched to a city commission form of government with a mayor and two at-large commissioners. The office of mayor was abolished in 1958 when Fond du Lac adopted the council–manager form of government.

== Village presidents (1848–1852) ==
Order	President	Term start	Term end	Notes
1	Mason C. Darling	1847	1848	Elected March 1, 1847.
2	George McWilliams	1848	1849	
3	John Bannister	1849	1851	No election was held in 1850.
4	Isaac Brown	1851	1852	
5	D. R. Curran	1852	1853	

== Mayors with 1-year term (1852–1911) ==
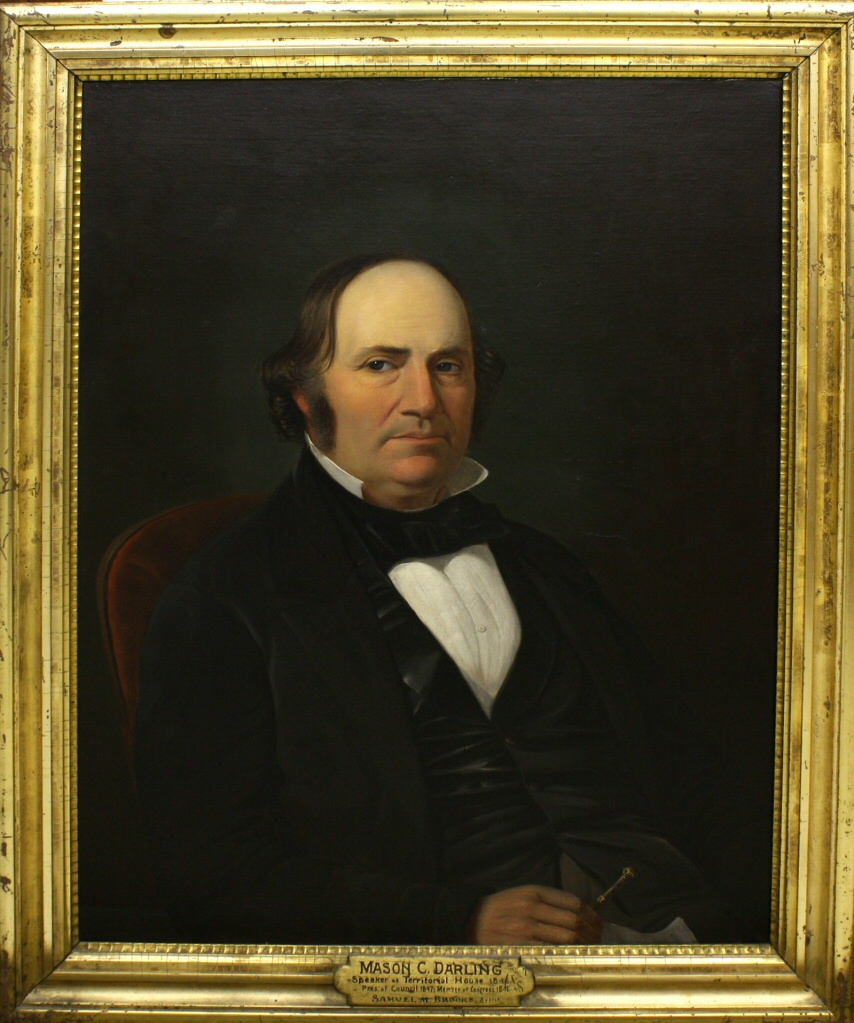
Mason C. Darling, 1st village president of Fond du Lac, and 1st and 4th mayor.

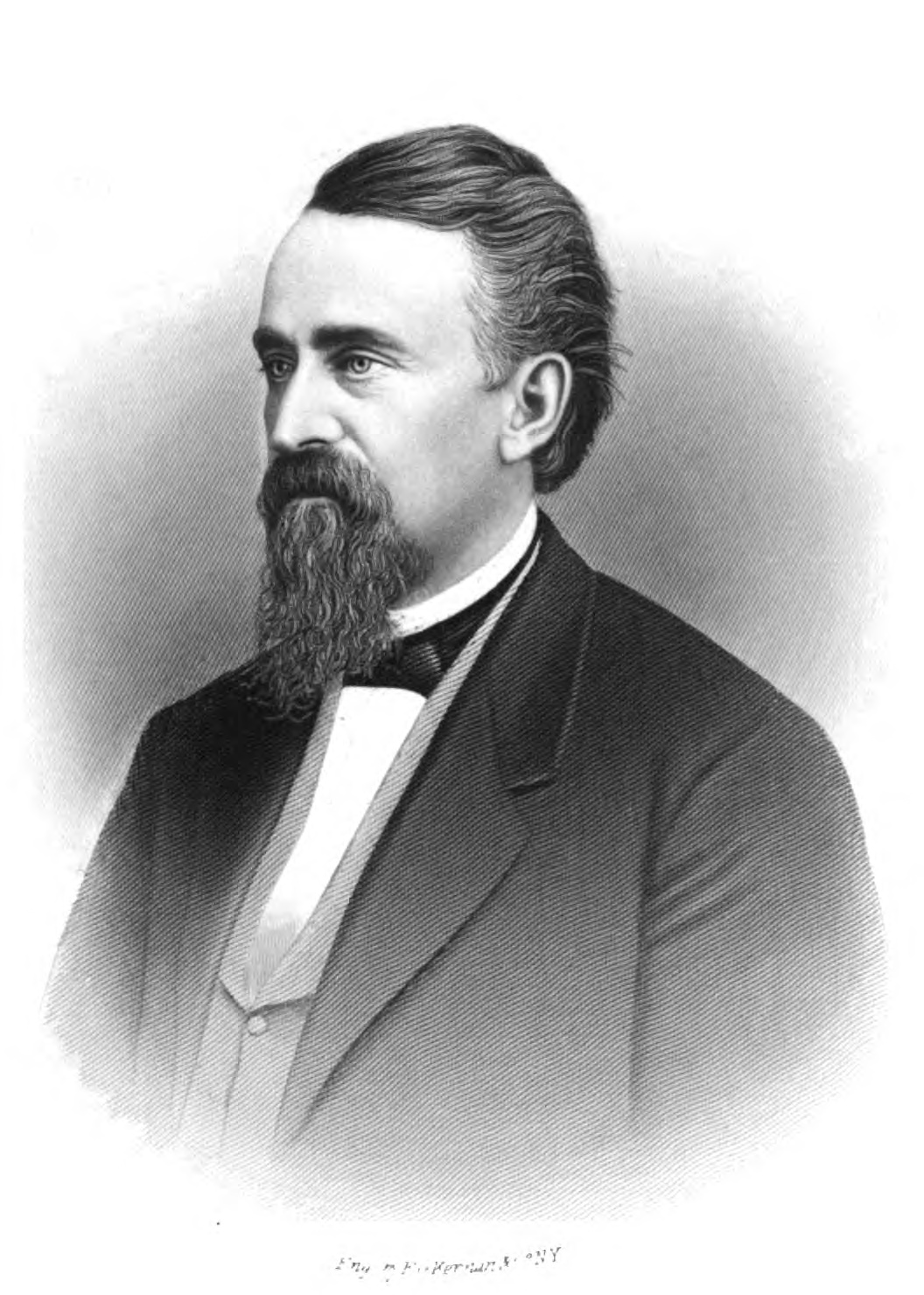
Edwin H. Galloway, 9th mayor.

Unless otherwise indicated, Wisconsin's mayoral elections have always taken place on the first Tuesday of April, with inauguration following within two weeks.

Order	Mayor	Term start	Term end	Notes
1	Mason C. Darling	1852	1853	Elected April 6, 1852
2	George McWilliams	1853	1854	
3	Isaac Brown	1854	1855	
4	Mason C. Darling	1855	1856	
5	Dexter E. Hoskins	1856	1857	
6	Isaac S. Sherwood	1857	1858	
7	John Bannister	1858	1859	
8	John Potter	1859	1860	
9	Edwin H. Galloway	1860	1861	
10	Jared M. Taylor	1861	1862	
11	A. D. Bonesteel	1862	1864	
12	Jared M. Taylor	1864	1865	Died October 1865.
-	William Hiner	1865	1866	Interim mayor.
13	James Sawyer	1866	1867	
14	William Hiner	1867	1868	
15	C. J. L. Meyer	1868	1869	
16	John Nichols	1869	1870	
17	T. J. Patchin	1870	1871	
18	E. N. Foster	1871	1873	
19	Alexander McDonald	1873	1874	
20	Harrison H. Dodd	1874	1875	
21	George W. Lusk	1875	1877	
22	C. A. Galloway	1877	1878	
23	Orin Hatch	1878	1879	
24	Samuel S. Bowers	1879	1882	
25	Thomas F. Mayham	1882	1885	
26	John Hughes	1885	1886	
27	Thomas F. Mayham	1886	1887	
28	Charles R. Harrison	1887	1888	
29	Alexander McDonald	1888	1889	
30	Benjamin F. Sweet	1889	1891	
31	Thomas F. Mayham	1891	1892	Fifth term.
32	Samuel S. Bowers	1892	1893	
33	Thomas F. Mayham	1893	1895	
34	E. E. Atkins	1895	1896	
35	Benjamin F. Sweet	1896	1897	
36	L. A. Ehrhart	1897	1898	
37	Thomas F. Mayham	1898	1899	First eight-term mayor.
38	Frank B. Hoskins	1899	1902	
39	L. A. Bishop	1902	1904	
40	John Hughes	1904	1906	
41	T. L. Doyle	1906	1908	
42	Edward W. Clark	1908	1911	

== Mayors with 2-year term (1911–1958) ==
In 1911, Fond du Lac adopted two-year terms for mayors. In 1915, they embraced the city commission form of government with a mayor and two at-large commissioners.

Order	Mayor	Term start	Term end	Notes
43	Frank J. Wolff	1911	1915	
44	Robert Haentze	1915	1916	Elected 1915. Died May 5, 1916.
-	Louis P. Peek	1916	1917	Interim mayor
45	John P. Hohensee	1917	1921	
46	Richard D. Haentze	1921	1927	
47	George W. Watson	1927	1933	
48	A. J. Rosenthal	1933	1939	
49	Leo J. Promen	1939	1945	
50	Edwin F. Weis	1945	1957	
51	Victor P. Capelle	1957	1958	

== City managers (1958–present) ==
In 1957, Fond du Lac voters elected to switch to a council–manager form of government, abolishing the office of mayor.

Order	Mayor	Term start	Term end	Notes
1	Robert H. McManus	1958	1965	Elected by city council August 15, 1958. Resigned November 19, 1965.
-	Elmer Bray	1965	1966	Acting manager.
2	Henry B. Buslee	1966	1967	Elected by city council February 1966. Took office March 1, 1966. Resigned September 1967.
3	Myron J. Medin Jr.	1967	1983	Elected by city council September 1967. Resigned September 1983.
4	Dan Thompson	1983	1989	Acting manager from September 1983. Elected by city council December 1983. Resigned March 10, 1989.
-	Bill Roemer	1989	1989	Acting manager.
5	Jack Howley	1989	1994	Elected by city council June 1989. Took office August 14, 1989. Asked to resign by city council September 1994.
-	Tom W. Ahrens	1994	1995	Acting manager.
6	Stephen T. Nenonen	1995	2003	Elected by city council March 1995. Took office June 1995. Retired December 2003.
7	Tom W. Ahrens	2003	2005	Acting manager until January 2005. Resigned April 27, 2005.
-	Wayne Rollin	2005	2005	Acting manager.
8	Tom Herre	2005	2012	Elected by city council July 13, 2005. Took office August 2005. Retired August 2012.
9	Joseph P. Moore	2012	Current	Elected by city council June 2012. Took office September 2012.

== City council presidents ==
- Rick Gudex, ca.2012
- Karyn Merkel, 2017-2019
- Brian Kolstad, 2019-2020
- Kay Miller, 2020-2022
- Patrick Mullen, 2022-2023
- Keith Heisler, 2023-2024
- Tiffany Brault, ca.2024-2026

== See also ==
- Fond du Lac history
