= Ex parte Milligan =

- Supreme Court of the United States

Argued March 5, 1866 Decided April 3, 1866
- Full case name: Ex parte Lambdin P. Milligan
- Citations: 71 U.S. 2 (more) 4 Wall. 2; 18 L. Ed. 281; 1866 U.S. LEXIS 861

Case history
- Prior: This case came before the Court upon a certificate of division from the judges of the Circuit Court for Indiana, on a petition for discharge from unlawful imprisonment.

Holding
- Trying citizens in military courts is unconstitutional when civilian courts are still operating. Trial by military tribunal is constitutional only when there is no power left but the military, and the military may validly try criminals only as long as is absolutely necessary.

Court membership
- Chief Justice Salmon P. Chase Associate Justices James M. Wayne · Samuel Nelson; Robert C. Grier · Nathan Clifford; Noah H. Swayne · Samuel F. Miller; David Davis · Stephen J. Field

Case opinions
- Majority: Davis, joined by Nelson, Grier, Clifford, Field
- Concurrence: Chase, joined by Wayne, Swayne, Miller

Laws applied
- U.S. Const., Habeas Corpus Suspension Act 1863

Ex parte Milligan, 71 U.S. (4 Wall.) 2 (1866), was a landmark decision of the U.S. Supreme Court that ruled that the use of military tribunals to try civilians when civil courts are operating is unconstitutional. In Ex parte Milligan, the Court was unwilling to uphold former President Abraham Lincoln's assertion of power to use military commissions to try civilian opponents of the war, part of the administration's controversial plan to deal with Union dissenters during the American Civil War. Justice David Davis, who delivered the majority opinion, stated that "martial rule can never exist when the courts are open" and confined martial law to areas of "military operations, where war really prevails", and when it was a necessity to provide a substitute for a civil authority that had been overthrown. Chief Justice Salmon P. Chase and three associate justices filed a separate opinion concurring with the majority in the judgment, but asserting that Congress had the power to authorize a military commission, although it had not done so in Milligan's case.

The case stemmed from a trial by a military commission of Lambdin P. Milligan, Stephen Horsey, William A. Bowles, and Andrew Humphreys that convened at Indianapolis on October 21, 1864. The charges against the men included, among others, conspiracy against the U.S. government, offering aid and comfort to the Confederates, and inciting rebellion. On December 10, 1864, Milligan, Bowles, and Horsey were found guilty on all charges and sentenced to hang. Humphreys was found guilty and sentenced to hard labor for the remainder of the war. (The sentence for Humphreys was later modified, allowing his release; President Andrew Johnson commuted the sentences for Milligan, Bowles, and Horsey to life imprisonment.) On May 10, 1865, Milligan's legal counsel filed a petition in the Circuit Court of the United States for the District of Indiana at Indianapolis for a writ of habeas corpus, which called for a justification of Milligan's arrest. A similar petition was filed on behalf of Bowles and Horsey. The two judges who reviewed Milligan's petition disagreed about the issue of whether the U.S. Constitution prohibited civilians from being tried by a military commission and passed the case to the U.S. Supreme Court. The case was argued before the Court on March 5 and March 13, 1866; the decision was handed down on April 3, 1866.

== Background ==
=== Suppression of dissenters ===
During the American Civil War, the administration of President Abraham Lincoln dealt with Union dissenters by declaring martial law; sanctioning arbitrary arrest and detention; suspending the writ of habeas corpus, which requires justification of any detention; and initiating trials by military commission rather than in conventional civil courts. The rationale for these actions was that Article 1, Section 9 of the U.S. Constitution authorizes the suspension of the writ of habeas corpus "when in Cases of Rebellion or Invasion the public Safety may require it". Lincoln theorized that the civil courts in the United States were established to try individuals and small groups "on charges of crimes well defined in the law" and not to deal with large groups of dissenters, whose actions, though damaging to the war effort, did not constitute a "defined crime" in states loyal to the government. Lincoln believed his administration's plan would suppress anti-government agitators, but he was also optimistic that it would be rescinded after the war ended.

The first test of Lincoln's thesis for silencing dissenters occurred in the spring of 1863. Clement Vallandigham, an Ohio politician and anti-war Democrat, was placed under arrest on May 5, 1863, taken to Cincinnati for a trial before a military commission, and jailed. Vallandigham was found guilty and sentenced to prison for the remainder of the war, but Lincoln commuted the sentence and ordered him exiled to the Confederacy. Vallandigham's petition to the U.S. Supreme Court, known as Ex parte Vallandigham, was denied.

=== Trial by military commission ===
The next test began with trials by a military commission that led to the U.S. Supreme Court case of Ex parte Milligan. On September 17, 1864, General Alvin Peterson Hovey, commander of the Military District of Indiana, authorized a military commission to meet on September 19 at Indianapolis, Indiana, to begin trials of Harrison H. Dodd, "grand commander" of the Sons of Liberty in Indiana, and others placed under military arrest. These prisoners included Democrats Lambdin P. Milligan, a lawyer living in Huntington, Indiana, and an outspoken critic of President Lincoln and Indiana's Republican governor Oliver P. Morton; Joseph J. Bingham, editor of the Indianapolis Daily Sentinel and chairman of Indiana's Democratic State Central Committee; William A. Bowles of French Lick, Indiana; William M. Harrison, secretary of the Democratic Club of Marion County, Indiana; Horace Heffren, editor of the Washington (Indiana) Democrat; Stephen Horsey of Martin County, Indiana; and Andrew Humphreys of Bloomfield, Indiana. Two other men, James B. Wilson and David T. Yeakel, were also seized. Dodd, who was the first to be tried, escaped from jail before his trial was completed and fled to Canada. On October 10, 1864, he was found guilty, convicted in absentia, and sentenced to hang. Charges against Bingham, Harrison, Yeakel, and Wilson were dismissed. Heffren was released before the proceedings against Milligan began.

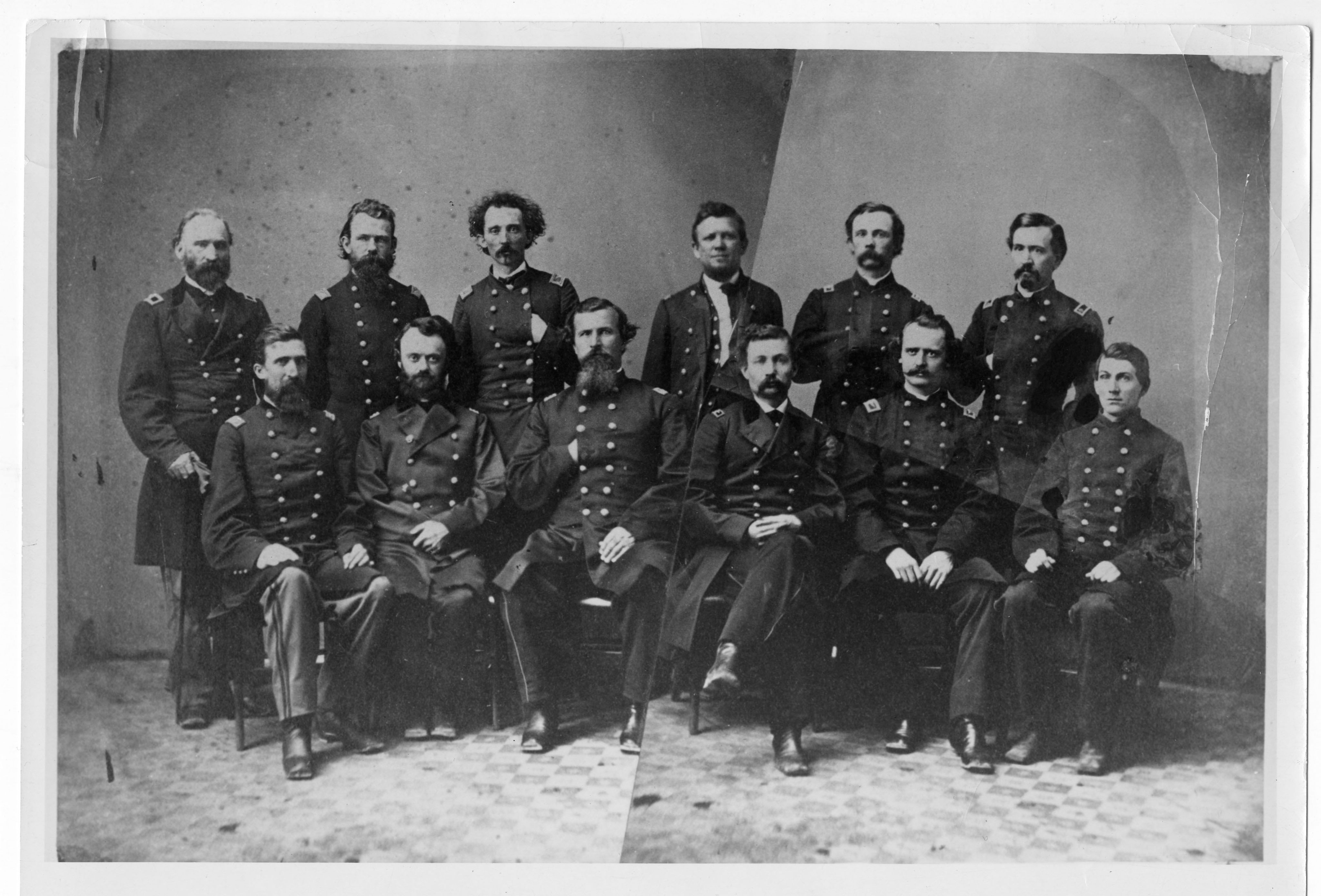
Military commission of October 1864

The military commission for the trial of Milligan, Horsey, Bowles, and Humphreys convened in Indianapolis on October 21, 1864. The commission considered five charges against the men: conspiracy against the U.S. government, offering aid and comfort to the Confederates, inciting insurrections, "disloyal practices", and "violation of the laws of war". The defendants were alleged to have established a secret organization that planned to liberate Confederate soldiers from Union prisoner-of-war camps in Illinois, Indiana, and Ohio, and then seize an arsenal, provide the freed prisoners with arms, raise an armed force to incite a general insurrection, and join with the Confederates to invade Indiana, Illinois, and Kentucky and make war on the government of the United States.

The military commission's decision on December 10, 1864, found Milligan, Bowles, and Horsey guilty. The men were sentenced to be hanged on May 19, 1865. Humphreys was found guilty and sentenced to hard labor for the remainder of the war. With President Lincoln's support, General Hovey modified the sentence for Humphreys, allowing his release, but Humphreys was required to remain within two specific townships in Greene County, Indiana, and could not participate in any acts that opposed the war. Efforts were made to secure pardons for Milligan, Bowles, and Horsey, with the decision passing to President Johnson following Lincoln's assassination.

=== Circuit Court petition ===
On May 10, 1865, Jonathan W. Gorden, Milligan's legal counsel, filed a petition for a writ of habeas corpus in the Circuit Court of the United States for the District of Indiana in Indianapolis. A similar petition was filed on behalf of Bowles and Horsey. The petitions were based on an act of the Congress titled "An Act Relating to Habeas Corpus and Regulation Judicial Proceedings in Certain Cases" that went into effect on March 3, 1863. The act was intended to resolve the question of whether Lincoln had the constitutional authority to suspend the writ of habeas corpus as authorized under Article 1, section 9, of the U.S. Constitution. Milligan's petition alleged that a federal grand jury had met in Indianapolis during January 1865, which it did, and it had not indicted him, which is also true, making him eligible for a release from prison under the congressional act.

On May 16, three days before their scheduled execution, Horsey's sentence was commuted to life imprisonment and the executions of Milligan and Bowles were postponed to June 2. President Johnson approved commutation of the sentences for Milligan and Bowles to life imprisonment on May 30, 1865. In the interim, Justice David Davis, an associate justice of the U.S. Supreme Court and a judge of the federal circuit that included Indiana, and Judge Thomas Drummond, another federal circuit court judge, reviewed Milligan's circuit court petition. The two judges disagreed about whether the U.S. Constitution prohibited civilians from being tried by a military commission and passed the case to the U.S. Supreme Court.

== Arguments ==
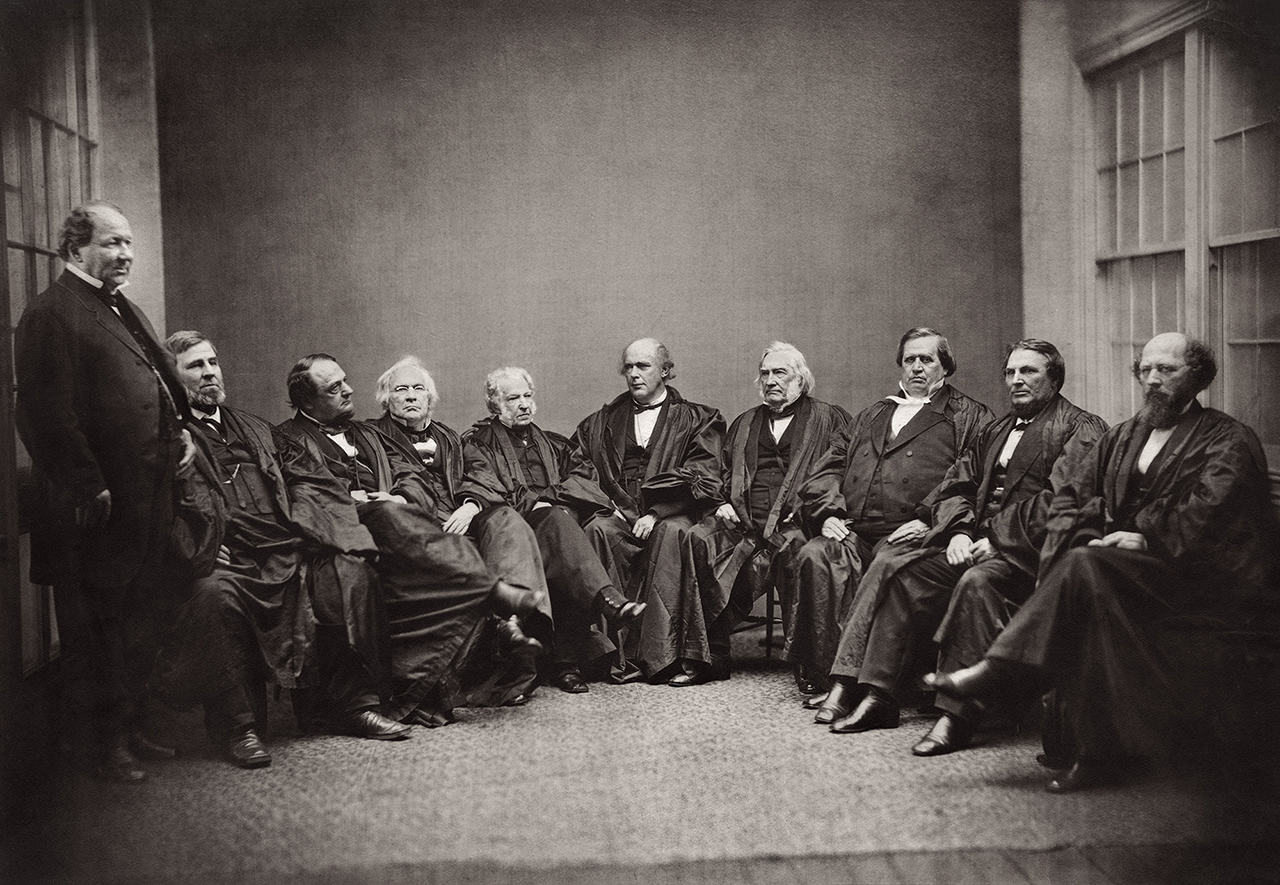
Chase Court from 1865 to 1867

The U.S. Supreme Court was asked to consider three questions in Ex parte Milligan:

- Should a writ of habeas corpus be issued based on Milligan's petition?
- Should Milligan be discharged from custody?
- Did the military commission have jurisdiction to try and sentence Milligan?

The Court did not consider the charges or the evidence presented in the trial by the military commission. The only issues it considered were whether the military commission's proceedings were constitutional and whether Milligan was entitled to a discharge.

The case was argued before the Court on March 5 and March 13, 1866. The team representing the United States was U.S. Attorney General James Speed, Henry Stanbery, and Benjamin F. Butler, a Civil War general who later became a congressman and governor of Massachusetts. General Butler delivered the argument for the United States. Among the members of Milligan's legal team were Joseph E. McDonald; David Dudley Field, who was a New York lawyer and brother of U.S. Supreme Court justice Stephen Johnson Field; James A. Garfield, a member of Congress in his first courtroom argument and a future U.S. president; and Jeremiah S. Black, who had been former President James Buchanan's U.S. Attorney General and U.S. Secretary of State.

== Decision ==
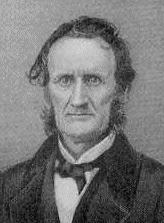
Lambdin P. Milligan

On April 3, 1866, Justice David Davis delivered the majority opinion, holding that, under the Constitution, military commission trials could not try civilians "where the courts are open and their process unobstructed" and where there was no war, as was the case in Indiana in 1864. The majority opinion also found that Congress could not authorize use of a military commission in such circumstances. Chief Justice Salmon P. Chase wrote a concurring opinion, disagreeing with the latter finding. Chase was concerned that, in the South, "courts might be open and undisturbed in the execution of their functions, and yet wholly incompetent to avert threatened danger, or to punish, with adequate promptitude and certainty, the guilty conspirators." In other words, state courts in the former Confederacy might not protect the former slaves from violence.

=== Three types of military jurisdiction ===
This decision clarified the scope of military jurisdiction under the U.S. Constitution. The Supreme Court held:

There are under the Constitution three kinds of military jurisdiction: one to be exercised both in peace and war, another to be exercised in time of foreign war without the boundaries of the United States, or in time of rebellion and civil war within states or districts occupied by rebels treated [71 U.S. 2, 142] as belligerents, and a third to be exercised in time of invasion or insurrection within the limits of the United States or during rebellion within the limits of states maintaining adhesion to the National Government, when the public danger requires its exercise. The first of these may be called jurisdiction under MILITARY LAW, and is found in acts of Congress prescribing rules and articles of war, or otherwise providing for the government of the national forces; the second may be distinguished as MILITARY GOVERNMENT, superseding, as far as may be deemed expedient, the local law and exercised by the military commander under the direction of the President, with the express or implied sanction of Congress, while the third may be denominated MARTIAL LAW PROPER, and is called into action by Congress, or temporarily, when the action of Congress cannot be invited, and, in the case of justifying or excusing peril, by the President, in times of insurrection or invasion or of civil or foreign war, within districts or localities where ordinary law no longer adequately secures public safety and private rights.

This distinction between martial law and military government was not commonly made before 1866. However, after the Supreme Court's clarification in this landmark case, it has continued to be referenced. Birkhimer describes the difference on page 1 of his opus Military Government and Martial Law (3rd edition, 1914): "Military jurisdiction is treated in the following pages in its two branches of Military Government and Martial Law. The former is exercised over enemy territory; the latter over loyal territory of the State enforcing it." According to the U.S. Army Field Manual FM 27-10, The Law of Land Warfare, paragraph 362: "Military government is the form of administration by which an occupying power exercises governmental authority over occupied territory. The necessity for such government arises from the failure or inability of the legitimate government to exercise its functions on account of the military occupation, or the undesirability of allowing it to do so."

== Concurrence ==
Justices David Davis, Nathan Clifford, Stephen Johnson Field, Robert Cooper Grier, and Samuel Nelson joined the majority opinion. Chief Justice Salmon P. Chase and Justices James Moore Wayne, Noah Haynes Swayne, and Samuel Freeman Miller filed a separate opinion concurring with the majority in the judgment but disagreeing with the majority's assertion that Congress did not have the power to authorize military commissions in Indiana, even though it had not done so in Milligan's case. Chase's concurring opinion noted that "courts might be open and undisturbed in the execution of their functions, and yet wholly incompetent to avert threatened danger, or to punish, with adequate promptitude and certainty, the guilty conspirators." The separate opinion also stated that Congress could "authorize trials for crimes against the security and safety of the national forces," and its authority to do so "may be derived from its constitutional authority to raise and support armies and to declare war", while the civil courts "might be open and undisturbed in the execution of their functions, and yet wholly incompetent to avert threatened danger or to punish, with adequate promptitude and certainty, the guilty conspirators". However, as Justice Davis described the status of the Circuit Court of Indiana at the time, "It needed no bayonets to protect it, and required no military aid to execute its judgments".

== Aftermath ==
Ex parte Milligan became well known as the leading U.S. Supreme Court case that found the president exceeded his legal powers to suppress dissenters during the American Civil War. The decision also helped establish the tradition that presidential and military action based on war had limits.

After Milligan's release from prison, he returned to his home and law practice in Huntington, Indiana. In 1868 he filed a civil lawsuit in Huntington County, Indiana, seeking damages related to Ex parte Milligan. Milligan's civil case was referred to the U.S. Circuit Court for Indiana at Indianapolis. Milligan v. Hovey, a two-week jury trial held in May 1871, named as defendants several men involved in Milligan's treason trial, including Alvin P. Hovey and Oliver P. Morton. Milligan hired Thomas A. Hendricks as his legal counsel. The defendants hired Benjamin Harrison, later the 23rd president. Milligan's civil suit was "the first major civil rights jury trial held before the federal courts." At issue was what damages, if any, Milligan had sustained relating to Ex parte Milligan. Harrison portrayed Milligan as a traitor, while Hendricks focused on the "malicious prosecution and false imprisonment" of Milligan. At the civil trial, Milligan refused to admit his affiliation or actions with a seditious organization. The jury issued its verdict in Milligan's favor on May 30, 1871. Although Milligan sought thousands of dollars in damages, state and federal statutes limited the claim to five dollars plus court costs.

== See also ==
- Ex parte Merryman (C.C.D. Md. 1861)
- Ex parte Quirin (1942)
- Hamdi v. Rumsfeld (2004)
- List of United States Supreme Court cases, volume 71
- Martial law
- Supreme Court cases of the American Civil War
