= Harrison H. Dodd =

American paramilitary leader

20th Mayor of Fond du Lac, Wisconsin
- In office April 1874 – April 1875
- Preceded by: Alexander McDonald
- Succeeded by: George W. Lusk

Personal details
- Born: February 29, 1824 Brownville, New York, U.S.
- Died: June 2, 1906 (aged 82) Fond du Lac, Wisconsin, U.S.
- Resting place: Rienzi Cemetery, Fond du Lac
- Spouse: Ann Maria Bradford (m. 1847; died 1893)
- Children: 4

Harrison Horton Dodd (February 29, 1824 – June 2, 1906) was a founder of the 1860s-era OSL (Order of Sons of Liberty), a paramilitary oath bound secret society which was a radicalized dissident splinter group of the KGC (Knights of the Golden Circle). The basic goal of members of the OSL was to thwart the war efforts of the Union military forces (as epitomised in the war policies of Abraham Lincoln and his close political and military allies), while remaining citizens of the United States. Later in life, he moved to Fond du Lac, Wisconsin, and served as the 20th mayor of that city.

== Life ==
Harrison Horton Dodd was born in Brownville, New York. In his early adult life he moved to Toledo, Ohio, where he unsuccessfully ran for mayor under the Know-Nothing Party banner in 1855. He moved to Indianapolis, Indiana the next year, establishing himself as a printer and an active participant for the Democratic Party. He died in Fond Du Lac, Wisconsin. Genealogy of the Daniel Dod family page 89

During the first year of the war, when Democrats were sometimes forced to take oaths of allegiance, Dodd advertised to start "Marion Dragoons," a company of soldiers to fight for the Union army. However, the company never actually formed.

== Political career ==
Dodd frequently campaigned against Oliver P. Morton's and Abraham Lincoln's policies, going so far as to help start the Sons of Liberty after becoming disillusioned with the OAK (Order of American Knights), although he never called the Sons that by name. By all accounts he was the most important Copperhead in Indianapolis. In 1863 a speech given by Dodd at Rensselaer, Indiana convinced a Methodist preacher that Dodd was a traitor. The local provost marshal without the authority to do so arrested Dodd. Local Democrats threatened a riot, and Dodd was freed with a promise that he would stop any such riot from occurring. Felix Grundy Stidger (1836–1908), a U.S. Secret Service Agent who had successfully infiltrated the OSL (Order of Sons of Liberty) and held the position of Grand Secretary of the OSL for the state of Kentucky, claimed that Dodd was planning on the releasing of the Confederate prisoners at Camp Morton.

On August 20, 1864, Dodd's offices were raided by the Union military, recovering thousands of rounds of ammunition and 400 revolvers, labelled "Sunday school books". Several of his co-conspirators, including William A. Bowles, were arrested. Dodd escaped into Canada. He was convicted of treason by a military commission and sentenced to be hanged. President Andrew Johnson commuted the sentence to life imprisonment on May 31, 1865. The conviction of the co-conspirators went through the federal courts, and eventually reached the United States Supreme Court, where Chief Justice Salmon P. Chase issued a writ of habeas corpus, freeing them, on April 3, 1866. On December 17, the Court ruled that since the civil courts were still functioning in Indiana at the time they were convicted by military commission, the convicted were denied constitutional protections and were freed under a holding styled as Ex parte Milligan.

Returning from Canada after the trials, Dodd served several terms as mayor of Fond du Lac, Wisconsin, as a Republican, joining the party of his wartime enemies Morton and Lincoln.

== See also ==
- List of mayors of Fond du Lac, Wisconsin
