= Ohio in the American Civil War =

During the American Civil War, the State of Ohio played a key role in providing troops, military officers, and supplies to the Union army. Due to its central location in the Northern United States and burgeoning population, Ohio was both politically and logistically important to the war effort. Despite the state's boasting a number of very powerful Republican politicians, it was divided politically. Portions of Southern Ohio followed the Peace Democrats and openly opposed President Abraham Lincoln's policies. Ohio played an important part in the Underground Railroad prior to the war, and remained a haven for escaped and runaway slaves during the war years.

The third most populous state in the Union at the time, Ohio raised nearly 320,000 soldiers for the Union army, third behind only New York and Pennsylvania in total manpower contributed to the military and the highest per capita of any Union state. Several leading generals were from Ohio, including Ulysses S. Grant, William T. Sherman, and Philip H. Sheridan. Five Ohio-born Civil War officers would later serve as the President of the United States. The Fighting McCooks gained fame as the largest immediate family group ever to become officers in the U.S. Army.

The state was spared many of the horrors of war as only two minor battles were fought within its borders. Morgan's Raid in the summer of 1863 spread fear but little damage. Ohio troops fought in nearly every major campaign during the war. Nearly 7,000 Buckeye soldiers were killed in action. Its most significant Civil War site is Johnson's Island, located in Sandusky Bay of Lake Erie. Barracks and outbuildings were constructed for a prisoner of war depot, intended chiefly for officers. Over three years more than 15,000 Confederate men were held there. The island includes a Confederate cemetery where about 300 men were buried.

== History ==
=== Ohio politics during the War ===
Much of southern Ohio's economy depended upon trade with the South across the Ohio River, which had served for years as passage and a link with the slave states of Virginia and Kentucky. The culture of southern Ohio was closer to those states than it was to northern parts of the state, owing to many settlers coming from the South and being formerly territory of the state of Virginia as part of the Virginia Military District. Most of the state's population was solidly against secession. During the 1860 Presidential Election, Ohio voted in favor of Abraham Lincoln (231,709 votes or 52.3% of the ballots cast) over Stephen Douglas (187,421; 42.3%), John C. Breckinridge (11,406; 2.6%), and John Bell (12,194; 2.8%).

A number of men with Ohio ties would serve important roles in Lincoln's Cabinet and administration, including Steubenville's Edwin M. Stanton as Attorney General and then Secretary of War, and former Ohio U.S. Senator and Governor Salmon P. Chase as Secretary of the Treasury. Prominent Ohio politicians in Congress included Senators John Sherman and Benjamin F. Wade.

During the war, three men would serve as Governor of Ohio– William Dennison, David Tod and John Brough. Without being asked by the War Department, Dennison sent Ohio troops into western Virginia, where they guarded the Wheeling Convention. The convention led to the admission of West Virginia as a free state. Tod became known as "the soldier's friend," for his determined efforts to help equip and sustain Ohio's troops. He was noted for his quick response in calling out the state militia to battle Confederate raiders. Brough strongly supported the Lincoln Administration's war efforts and was key to persuading other Midwestern governors to raise 100-day regiments, such as the 131st Ohio Infantry in early 1864, to release more seasoned troops for duty in Gen. Ulysses S. Grant's spring campaign.

=== Copperheads ===
Through the middle of the war, the Copperhead movement had appeal in Ohio, driven in part by noted states rights advocate, Congressman Clement Vallandigham, a leading Peace Democrat. After General Ambrose E. Burnside issued General Order Number 38 in early 1863, warning that the "habit of declaring sympathies for the enemy" would not be tolerated in the Military District of Ohio, Vallandigham gave a major speech charging the war was being fought not to save the Union, but to free blacks and enslave whites.

Burnside ordered his arrest and took Vallandigham to Cincinnati for trial. At the trial, Vallandigham was found guilty. The court sentenced him to prison for the duration of the war. President Lincoln attempted to quiet the situation by writing the Birchard Letter, which offered to release Vallandigham if several Ohio congressmen agreed to support certain policies of the Administration. To try to prevent political backlash and preserve authority of Gen. Burnside, Abraham Lincoln changed Vallandigham's sentence to banishment to the South. The threat was imprisonment if Vallandigham returned to northern soil. The South allowed Vallandigham to migrate to Canada, from where he ran an unsuccessful campaign for governor against Brough in 1863. Vallandigham's campaign bitterly divided much of Ohio, Vallandigham's votes were especially heavy in central and northwestern Ohio. He lost his home county of Montgomery (Dayton) but by a narrow margin.

=== 1864 election ===
Public sentiment shifted more in favor of the Lincoln Administration, particularly as Ohio generals rose in prominence, with military successes in the Atlanta campaign, the Siege of Petersburg, and Sheridan's Valley Campaigns. In the 1864 Presidential Election, Ohio strongly supported Lincoln's reelection. The state gave the president 265,674 votes (56.4% of the total) versus 205,609 votes (43.6%) for General George McClellan.

En route to Washington, D.C. for his inauguration, President Lincoln passed through Ohio by train, with brief stops in numerous cities. His first formal speech given after his election was in Hudson, Ohio, a stop he made en route to Cleveland. Although Lincoln had visited the state several times before the war, he would not return during the Civil War. In 1865 his funeral train carried his body through the state, bound for Springfield, Illinois.

Newspapers engaged in active discussion of war issues from the Republican, War Democrat and Copperhead perspectives.

=== Military recruitment ===
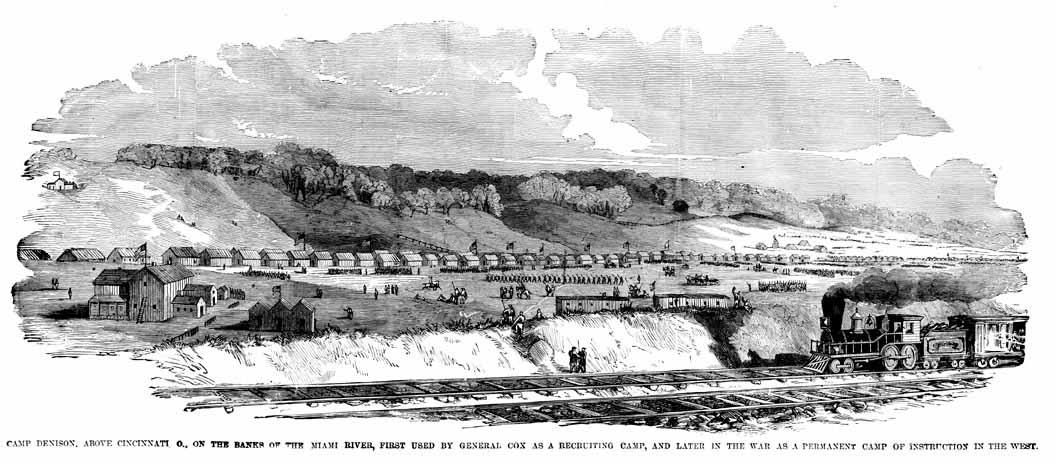
Camp Dennison near Cincinnati, Ohio, set up to train and drill Ohio soldiers.

At the outbreak of the Civil War in 1861, in response to a call to arms by President Lincoln, Ohio raised 23 volunteer infantry regiments for three months' service, 10 more regiments than the state's quota. When it became evident that the war would not end quickly, Ohio began raising regiments for three-year terms of enlistment. At first the majority were stocked with eager volunteers and recruits. Before the war's end, they would be joined by 8,750 draftees. Ohio volunteers also filled regiments in the neighboring states of Kentucky and West Virginia. They composed most of the 1st and 2nd Kentucky Infantry, and large parts of 5 regiments credited to West Virginia, including the 2nd West Virginia Cavalry Regiment, the 4th and 5th West Virginia Infantry.

319,189 Ohioans served in the Union army, more than any other northern state except New York and Pennsylvania. Of these, 5,092 were free blacks. Ohio had the highest percentage of population enlisted in the military of any state. Sixty percent of all the men between the ages of 18 and 45 were in the service. Ohio mustered 230 regiments of infantry and cavalry, as well as 26 light artillery batteries and 5 independent companies of sharpshooters. Total casualties among these units numbered 35,475 men, more than 10% of all the Buckeyes in uniform during the war. There were 6,835 men killed in action, including 402 officers.

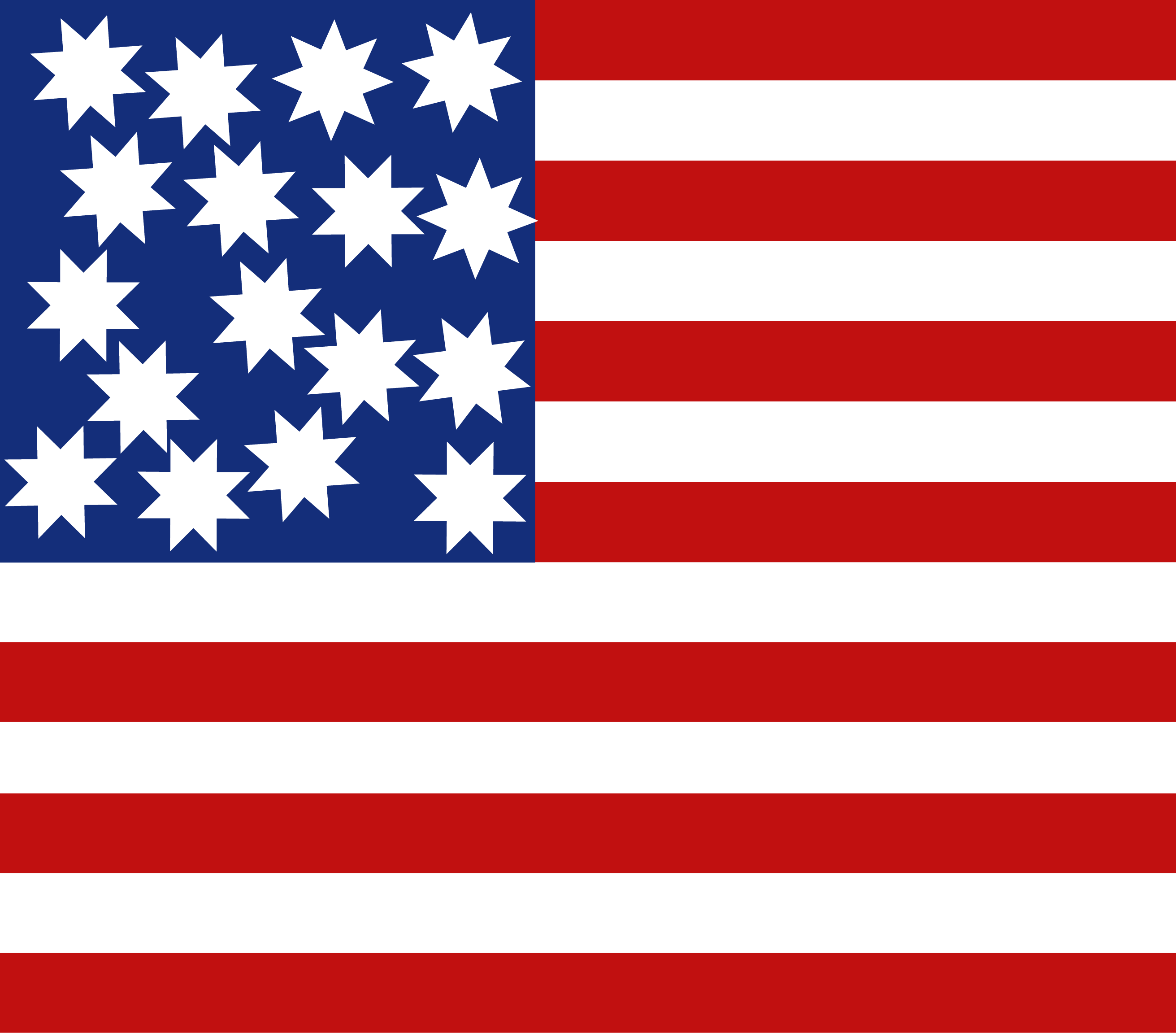
Digital remake of a 17 star US flag carried by Ohio soldiers

Dozens of small camps were established across the state to train and drill the new regiments. Two large military posts were created: Camp Chase in Columbus and Camp Dennison near Cincinnati. The 1st Regiment, Ohio Volunteer Infantry (OVI) would eventually be joined on the muster rolls by more than 100 additional infantry regiments.

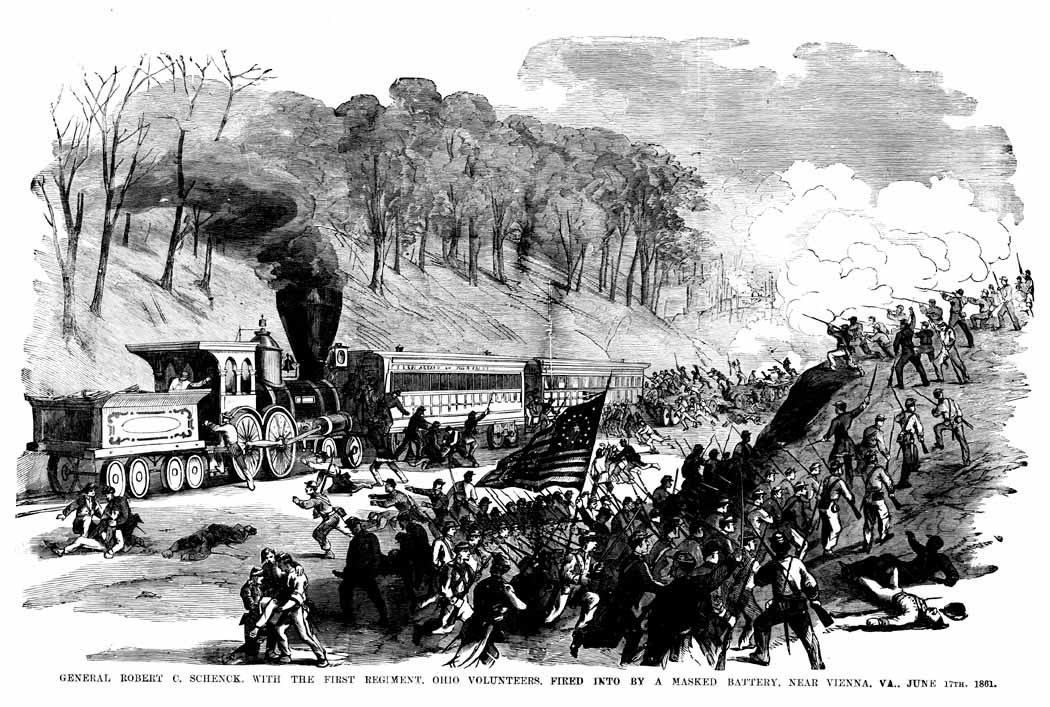
1st Ohio Infantry in action, June 1861.

Ohioans first had military action at the Battle of Philippi Races in June 1861, where the 14th and 16th Ohio Infantry participated in the Union victory. Ohioans comprised one-fifth of the Union army at the April 1862 Battle of Shiloh, where 1,676 Buckeyes suffered casualties. Ohio would suffer its highest casualty count at the Battle of Chickamauga in September 1863, with 3,591 killed or wounded. Another 1,351 men were taken prisoner of war by the Confederates. Among these prisoners, 36 men from the 2nd Ohio Infantry would perish in the infamous Andersonville prison, as did hundreds more Buckeye soldiers there.

Several Buckeye regiments played critical roles in other important battles. The 8th OVI was instrumental in helping repulse Pickett's Charge at the Battle of Gettysburg. At the same battle, the 66th OVI flanked repeated Confederate assaults and helped secure the crest of Culp's Hill. George Nixon, great-grandfather of President Richard Nixon, died at Gettysburg in the 73rd OVI.

John Clem, celebrated as "Johnny Shiloh" and "The Drummer Boy of Chickamauga," became the youngest person to become a noncommissioned officer in United States Army history. More than 100 soldiers from Ohio units earned the Medal of Honor during the conflict. Several were awarded it for the ill-fated Great Locomotive Chase.

President Lincoln had a habit on the eve of a battle of asking how many Ohio men would participate. When someone inquired why, Lincoln remarked, "Because I know that if there are many Ohio soldiers to be engaged, it is probable we will win the battle, for they can be relied upon in such an emergency."

Small-scale riots broke out in ethnic German and Irish districts, and in areas along the Ohio River with many Copperheads. Holmes County, Ohio was an isolated localistic areas dominated by Pennsylvania Dutch and some recent German immigrants. It was a Democratic stronghold and few men dared speak out in favor of conscription. Local politicians denounced Lincoln and Congress as despotic, seeing the draft law as a violation of their local autonomy. In June 1863, small scale disturbance broke out; but ended when the Army sent in armed units.

John A. Gillis, a corporal from the 64th Ohio Infantry, gave his reasons for fighting for the Union in the war, stating in his diary that "We are now fighting to destroy the cause of these dangerous diseases, which is slavery and the slave power."

=== Military actions in Ohio ===
Unlike its neighbors West Virginia, Kentucky, and Pennsylvania, Ohio was spared from serious military encounters. In September 1862, Confederate forces under Brig. Gen. Henry Heth marched through northern Kentucky and threatened Cincinnati (see Defense of Cincinnati). They turned away after encountering strong Union fortifications south of the Ohio River. Not long afterwards, Brig. Gen. Albert G. Jenkins briefly passed through the extreme southern tip of Ohio during a raid.

It was not until the summer of 1863 that Confederates arrived in force, when John Hunt Morgan's cavalry division traversed southern and eastern Ohio during Morgan's Raid. His activities culminated in Morgan's capture in Columbiana County at the Battle of Salineville. The Battle of Buffington Island was the largest fought in Ohio during the Civil War.

== Notable Civil War leaders from Ohio ==
Numerous leading generals and army commanders hailed from Ohio. The General-in-Chief of the Union armies, Ulysses S. Grant, was born in Clermont County in 1822. Among the 19 major generals from Ohio were William T. Sherman, Philip H. Sheridan, Don Carlos Buell, Jacob D. Cox, George Crook, George Armstrong Custer, James A. Garfield, Irvin McDowell, James B. McPherson, William S. Rosecrans, and Alexander M. McCook (of the "Fighting McCook" family, which sent a number of generals into the service). The state would contribute 53 brigadier generals.

A handful of Confederate generals were Ohio-born, including Bushrod Johnson of Belmont County and Robert H. Hatton of Steubenville. Charles Clark of Cincinnati led a division in the Army of Mississippi during the Battle of Shiloh and then became the late war pro-Confederate Governor of Missouri. Noted Confederate guerrilla Capt. William Quantrill was also born and raised in Ohio.

In addition to Grant and Garfield, three other Ohio Civil War veterans would become President of the United States in the decades following the war: William McKinley of Canton, Rutherford B. Hayes of Fremont, and Benjamin Harrison of the greater Cincinnati area.

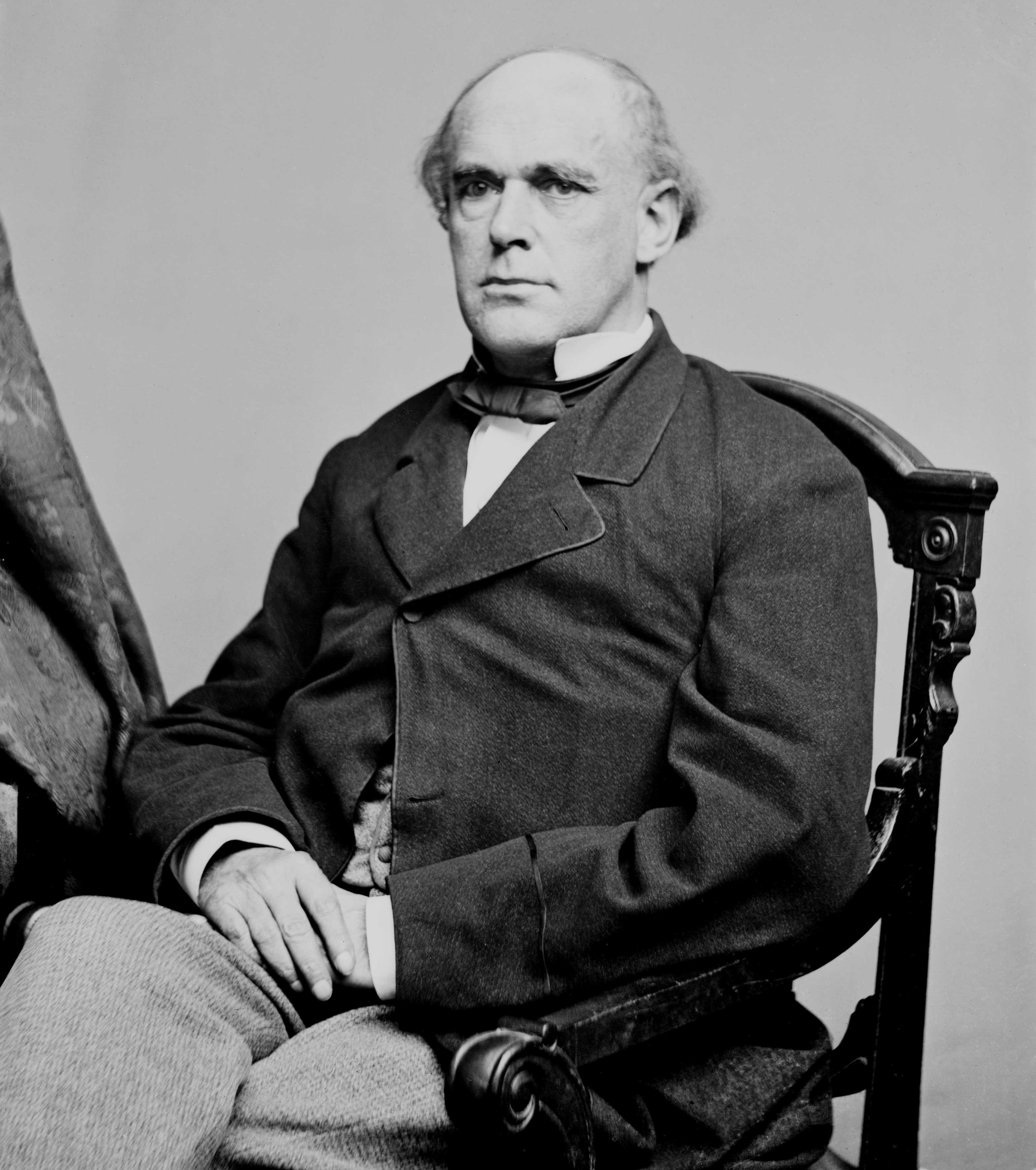
Sec. of Treasury/Chief Justice
Salmon P. Chase

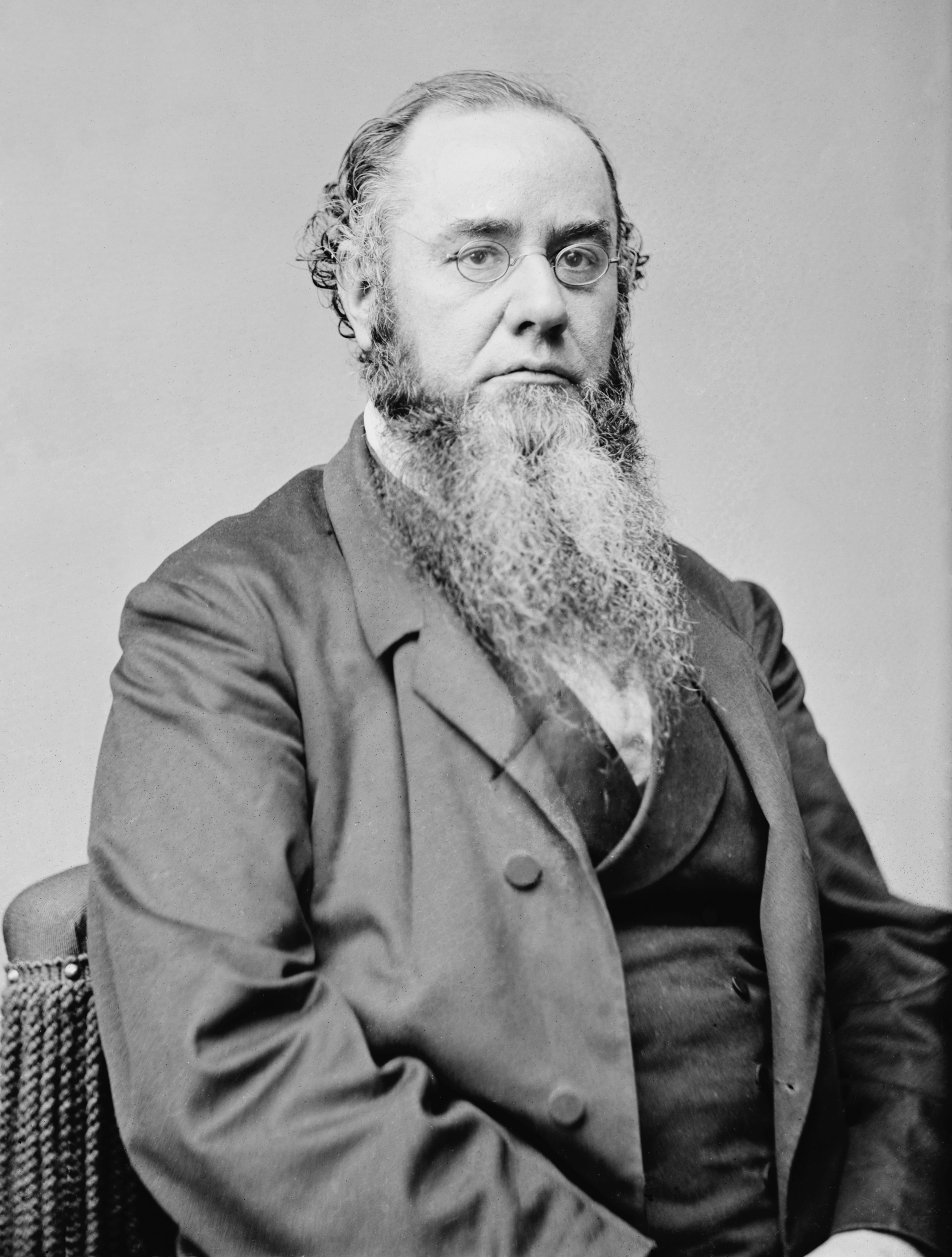
Sec. of War
Edwin M. Stanton

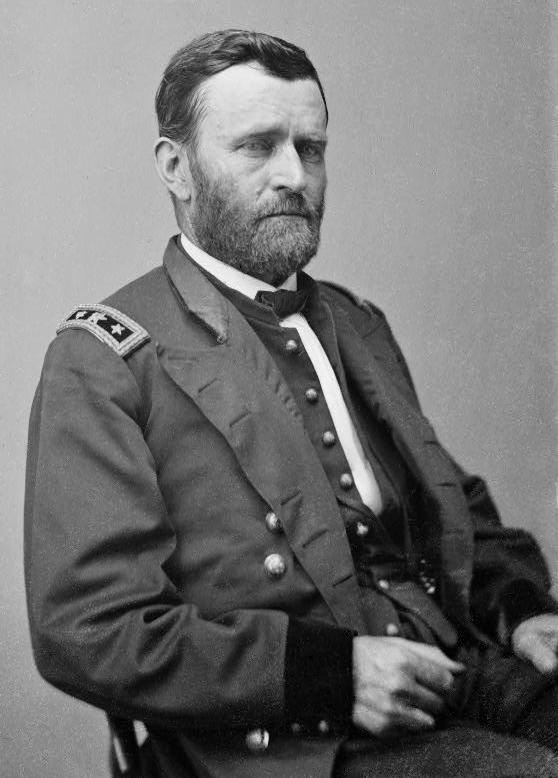
Lt. Gen.
Ulysses S. Grant

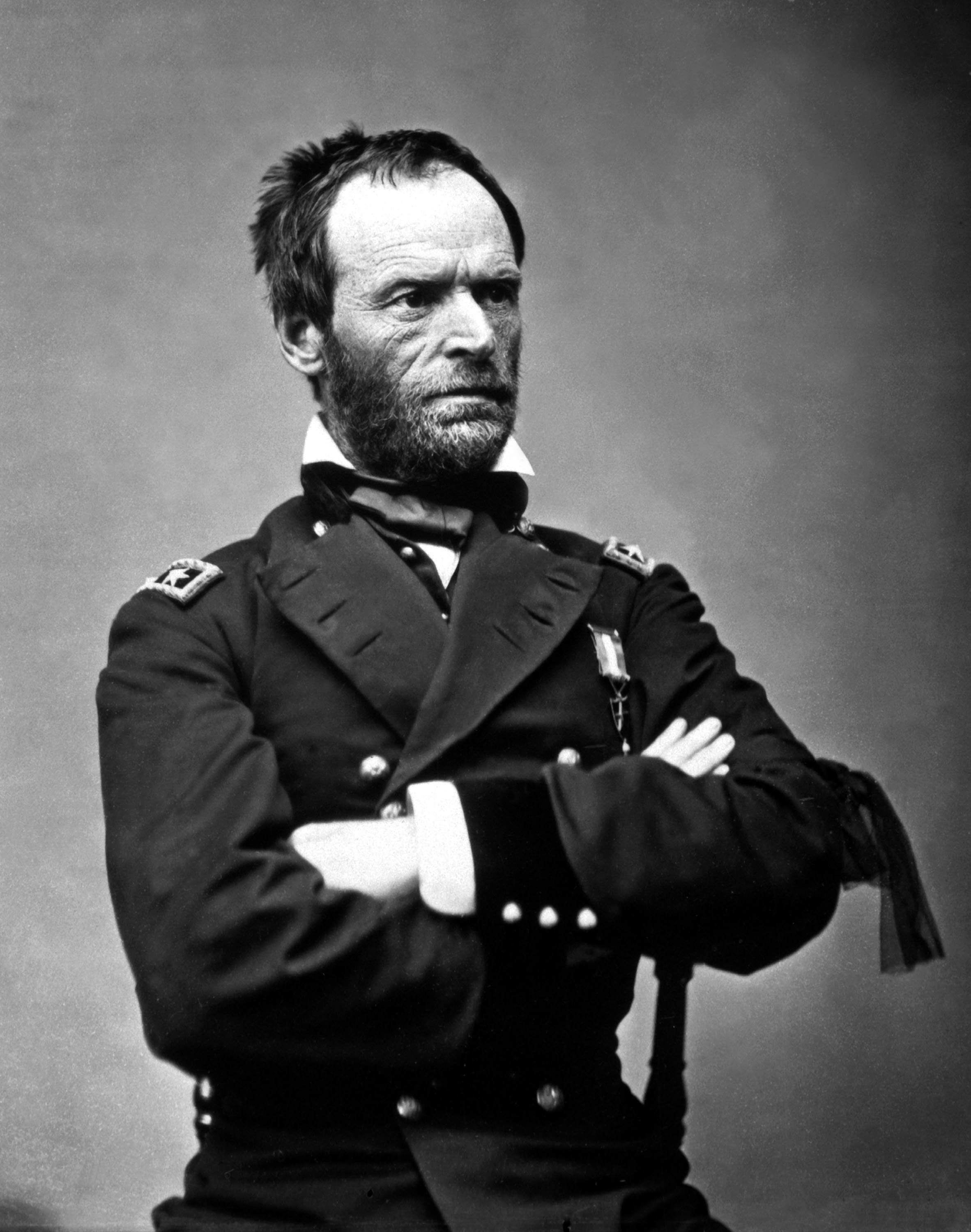
Maj. Gen.
William T. Sherman

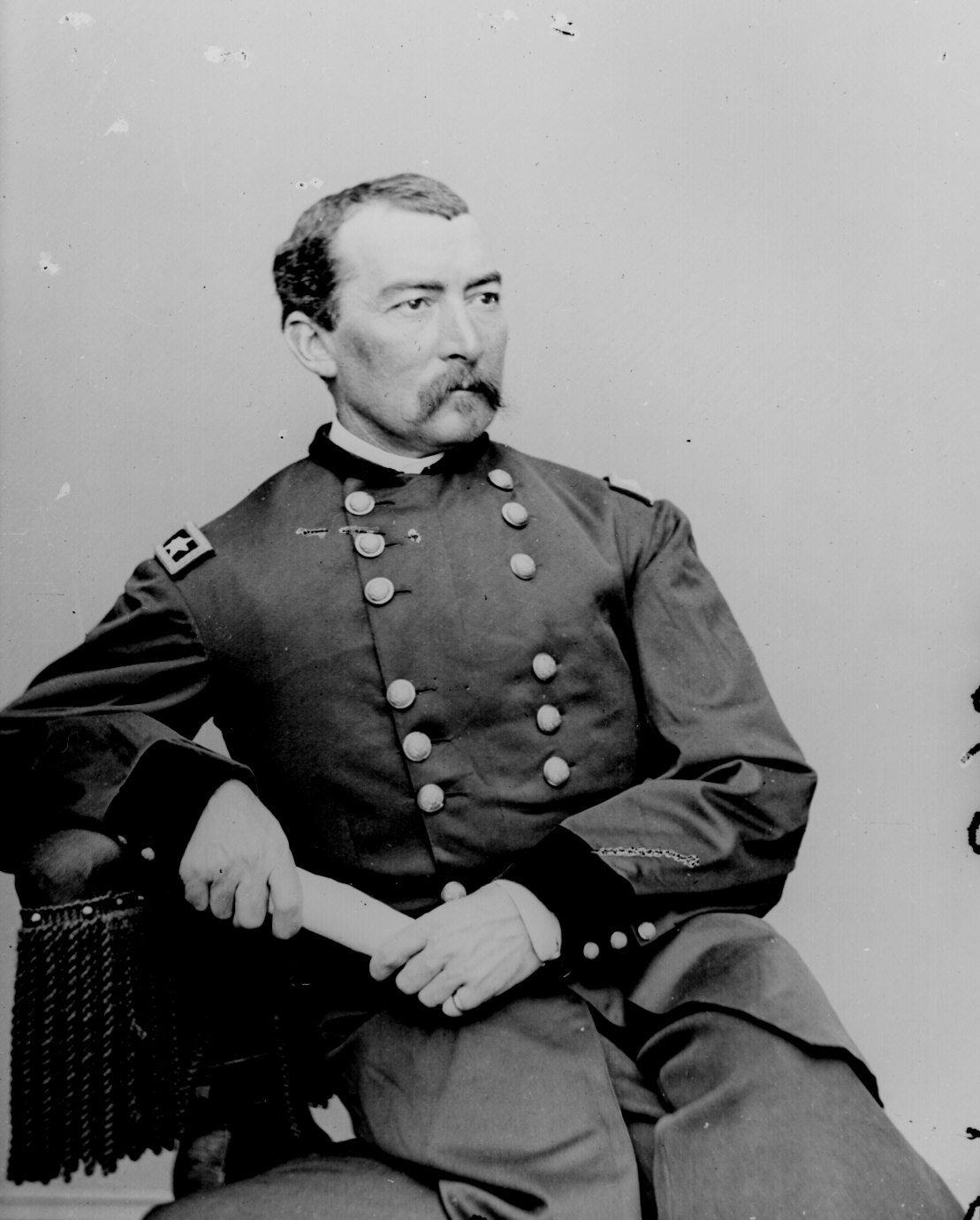
Maj. Gen.
Philip H. Sheridan

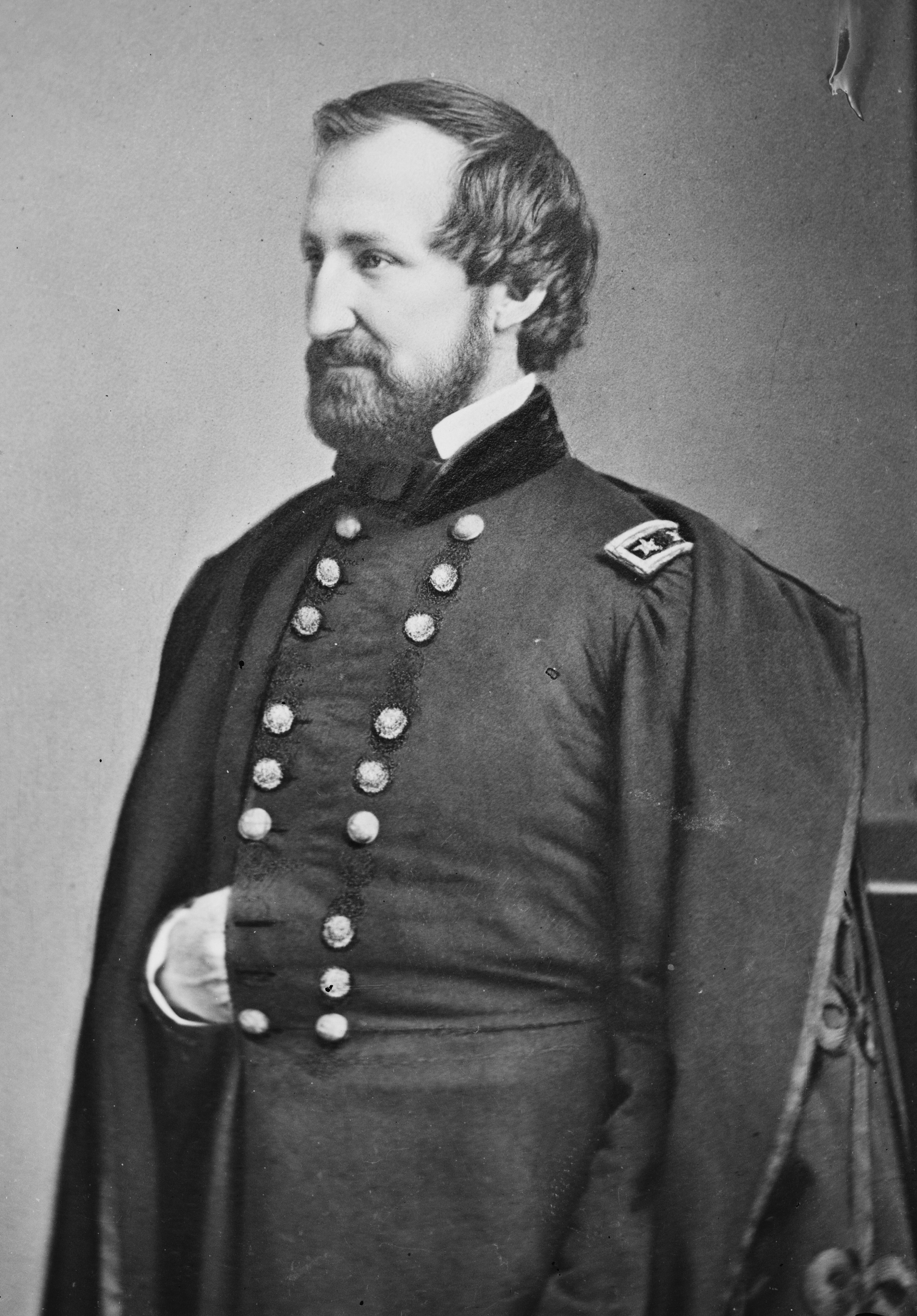
Maj. Gen.
William S. Rosecrans

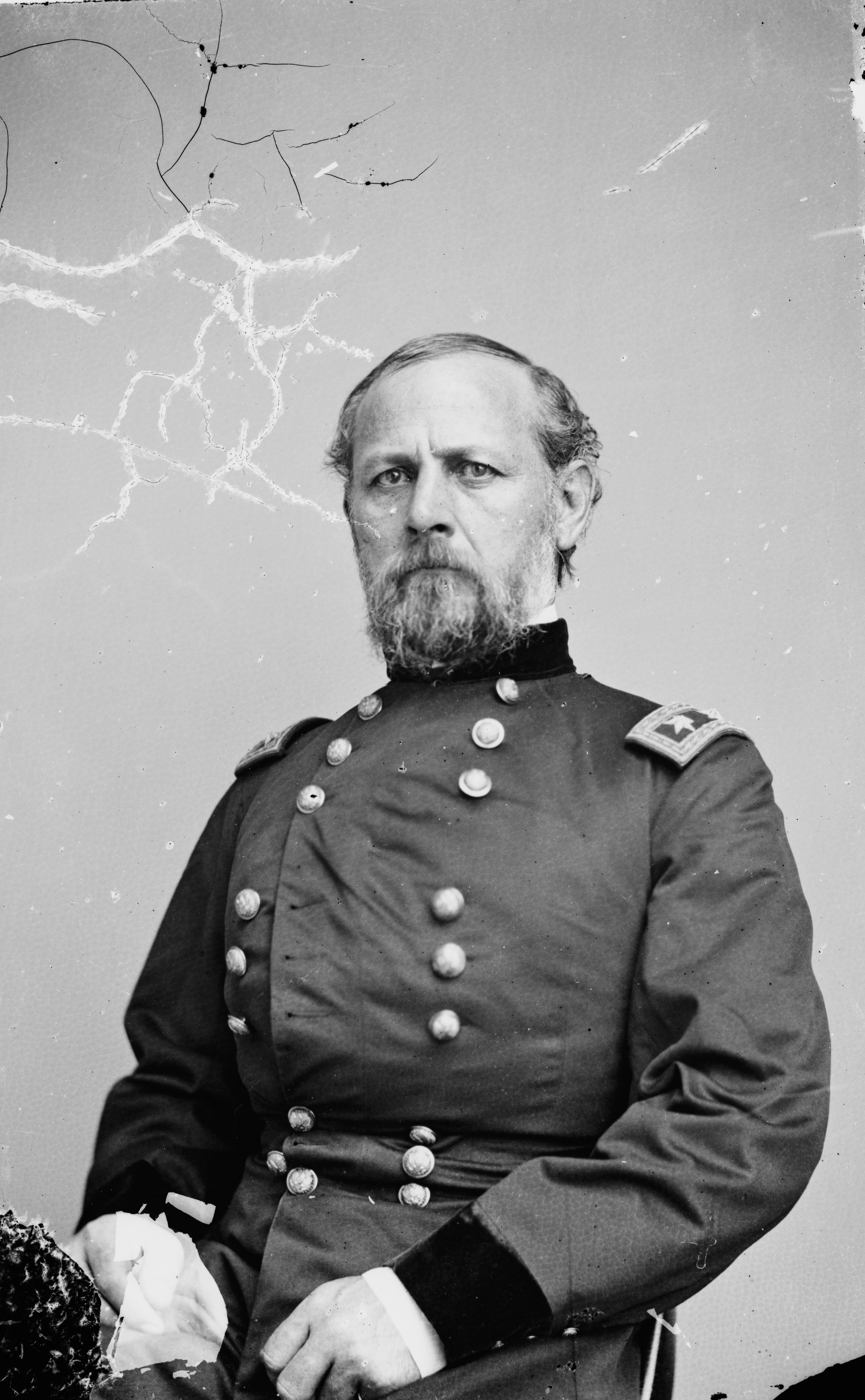
Maj. Gen.
Don Carlos Buell

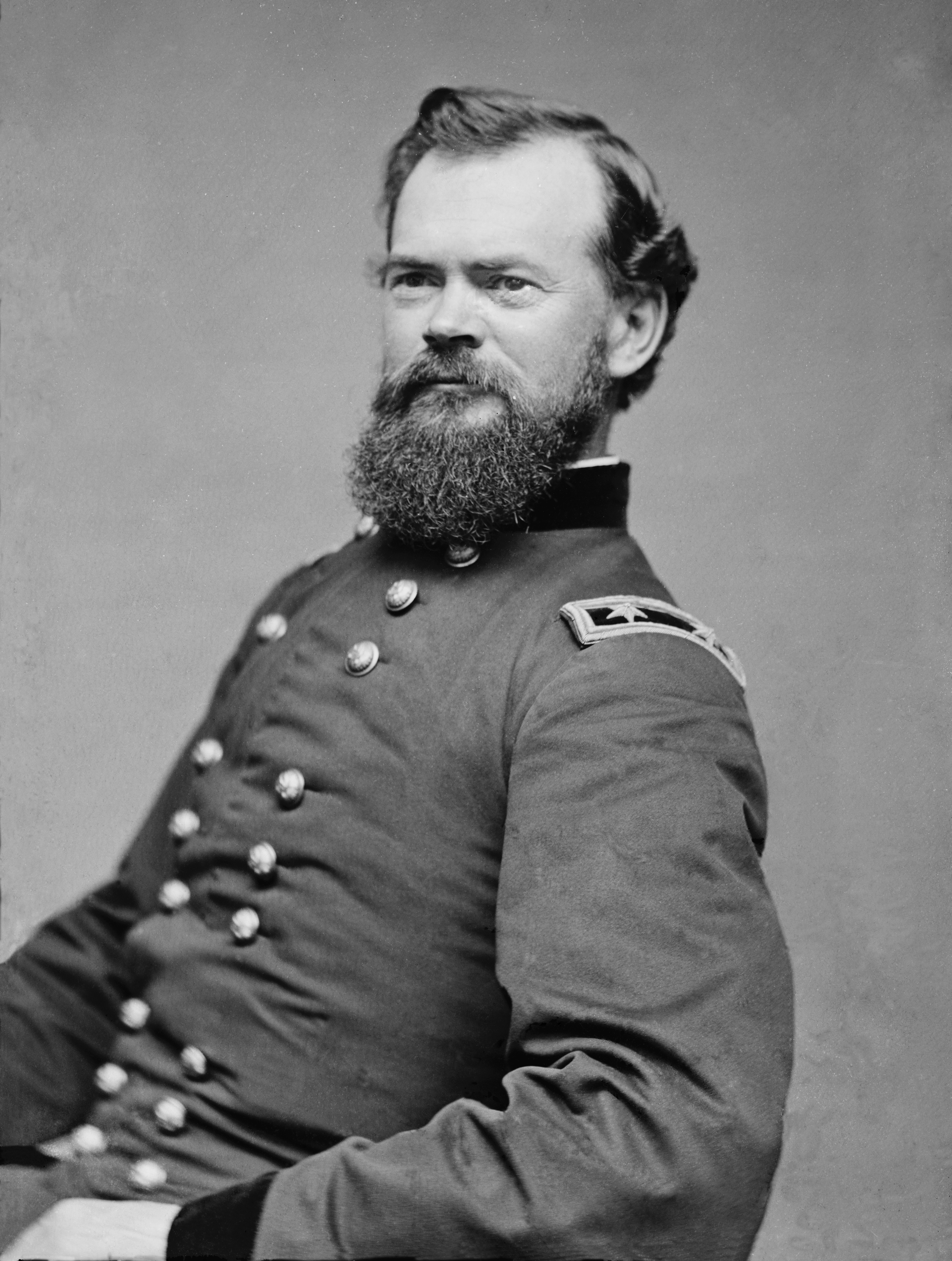
Maj. Gen.
James B. McPherson

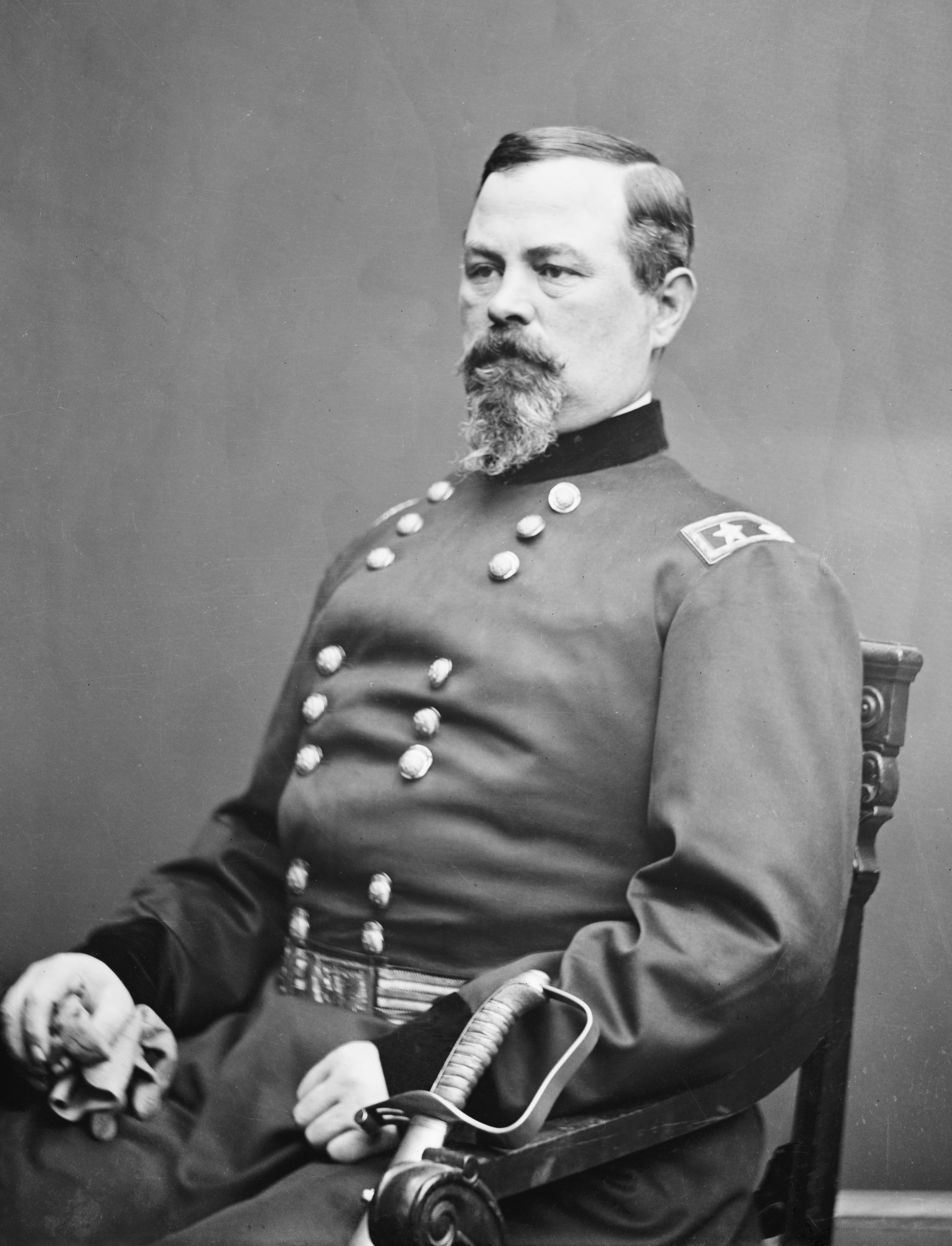
Maj. Gen.
Irvin McDowell

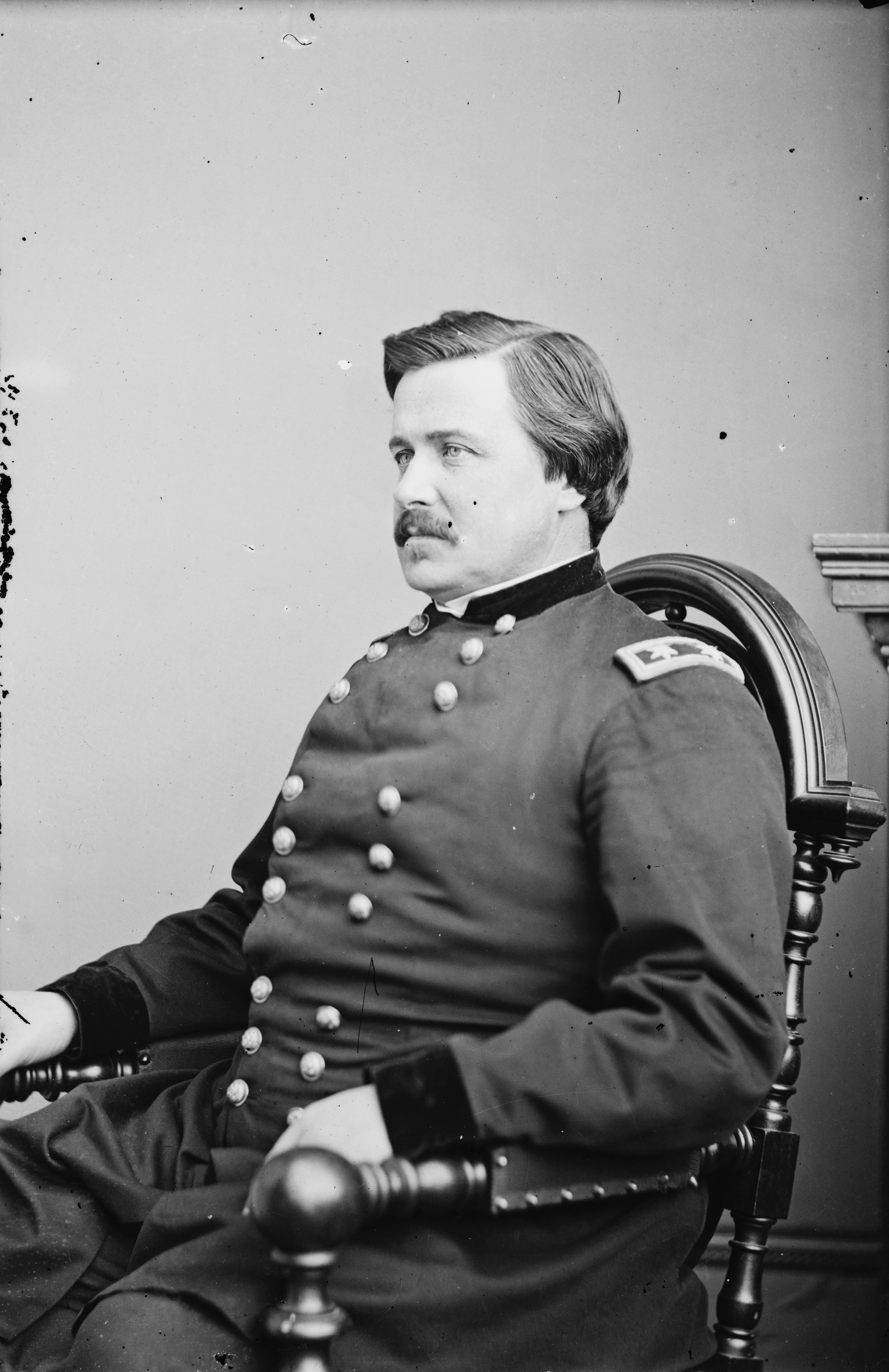
Maj. Gen.
Alexander M. McCook

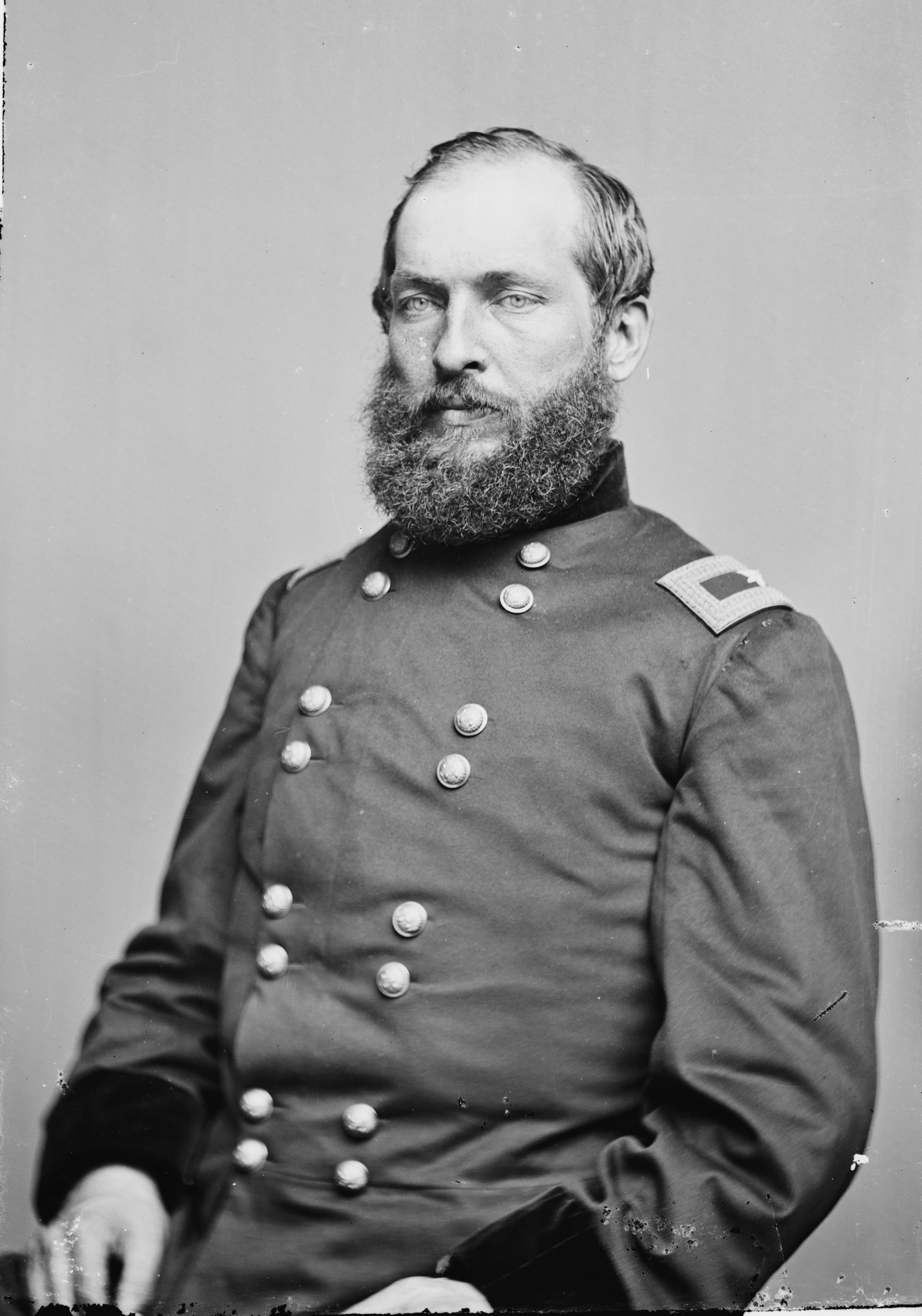
Maj. Gen.
James A. Garfield

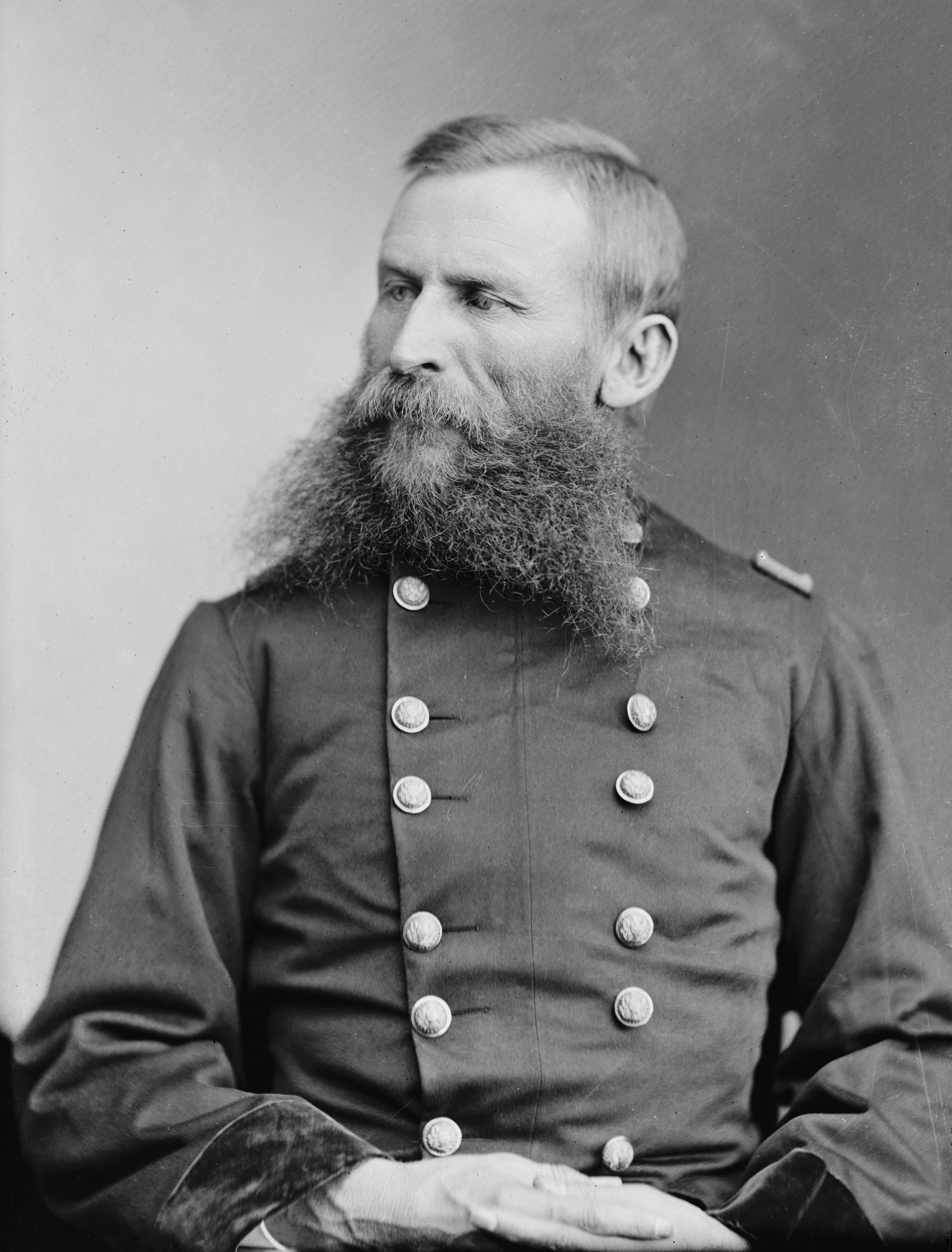
Maj. Gen.
George Crook

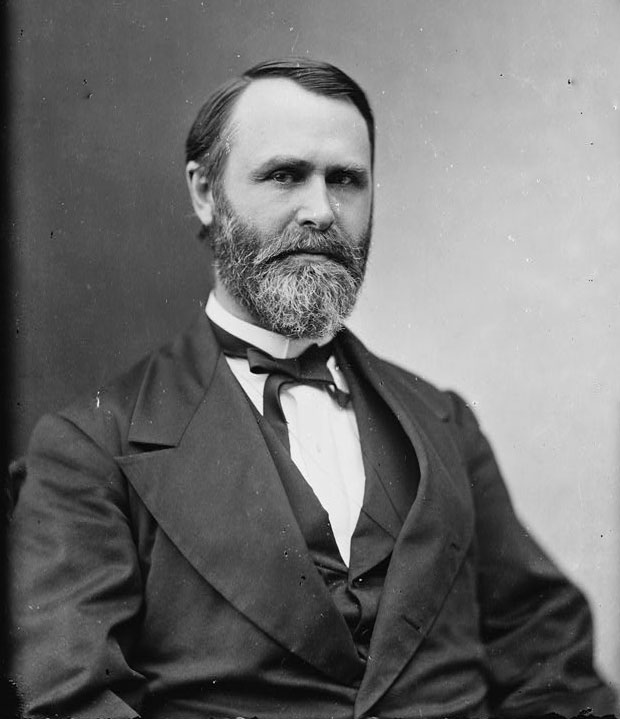
Maj. Gen.
Jacob D. Cox

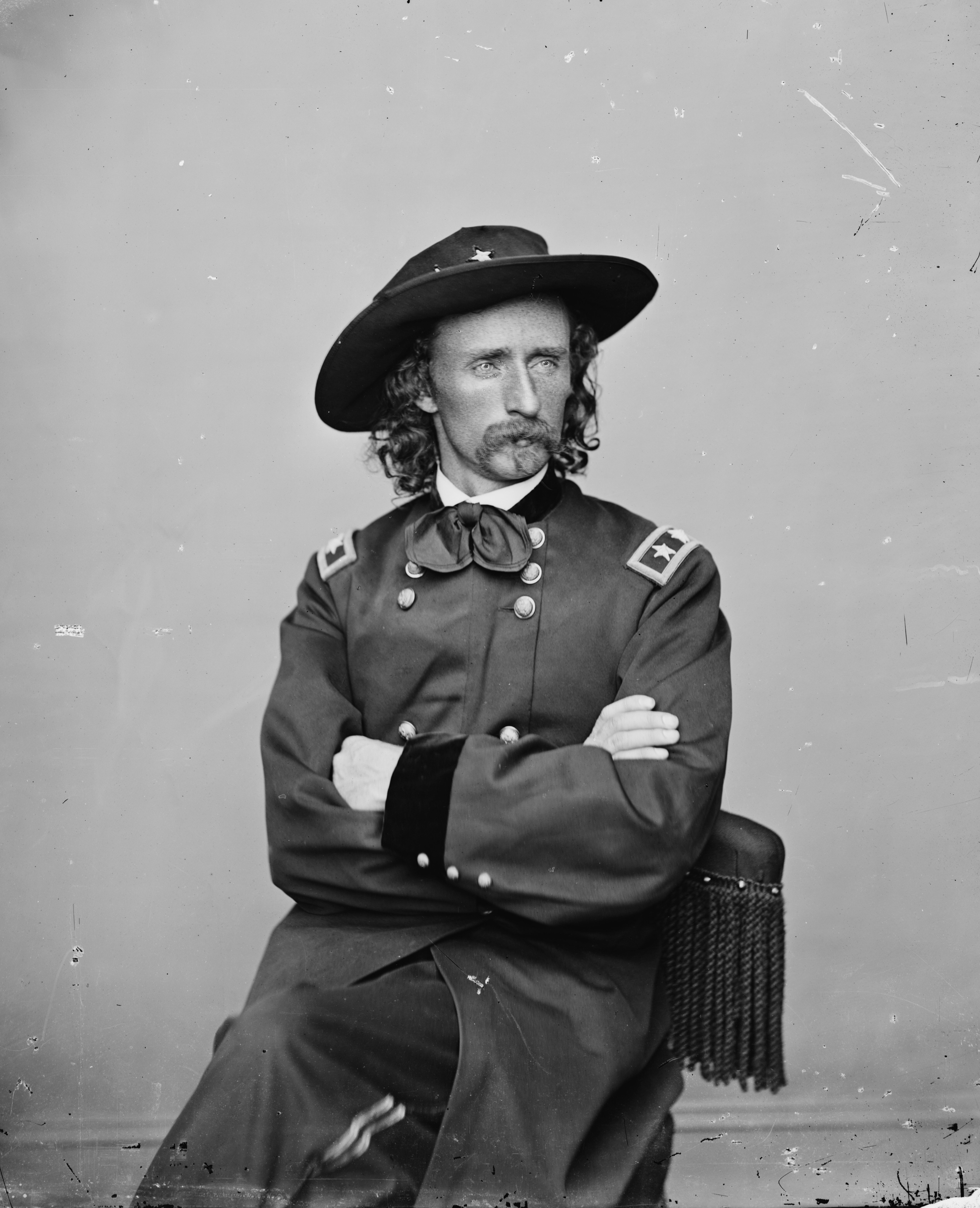
Maj. Gen.
George A. Custer

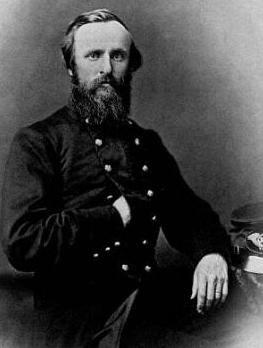
Maj. Gen.
Rutherford B. Hayes

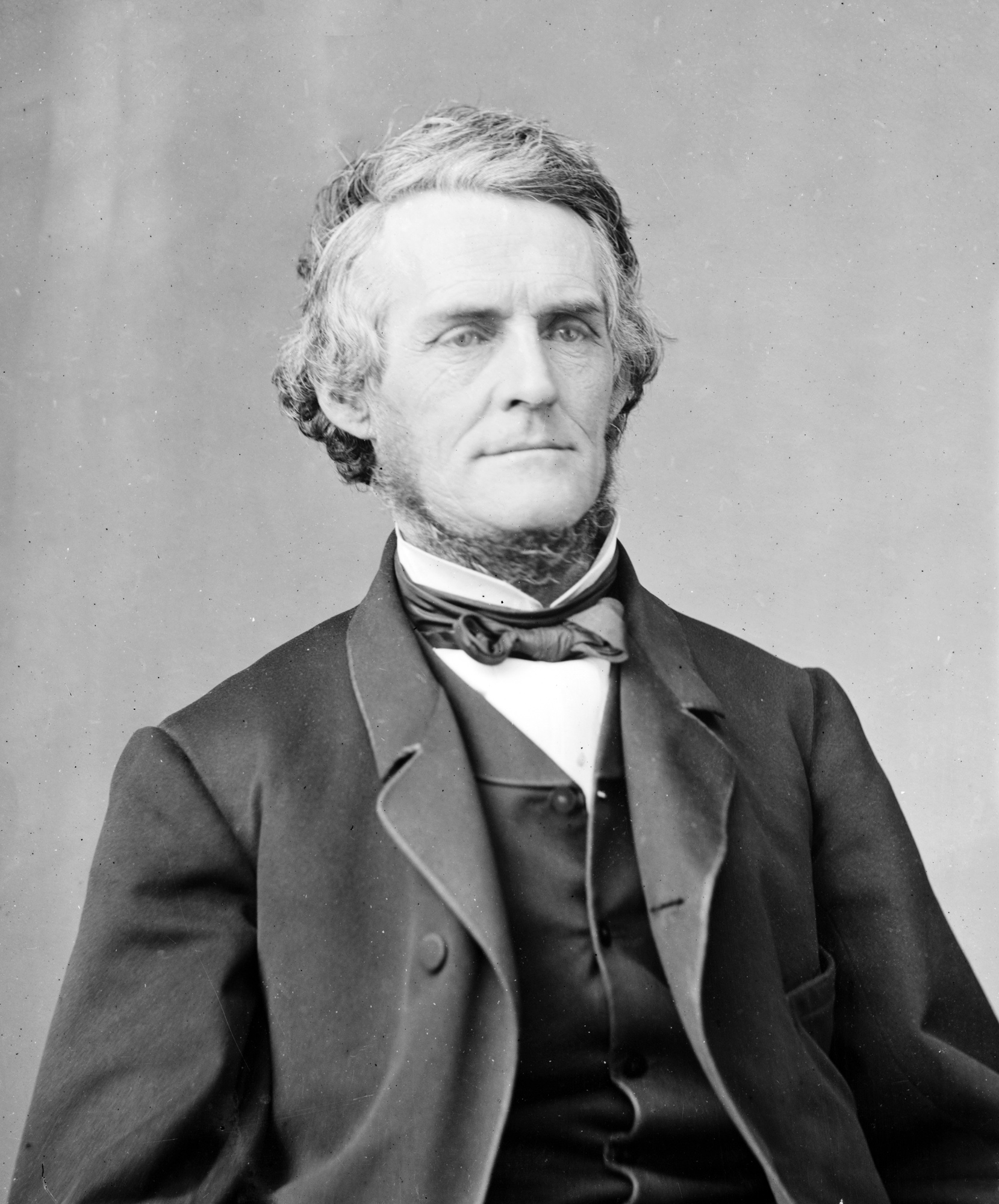
Postmaster Gen.
William Dennison

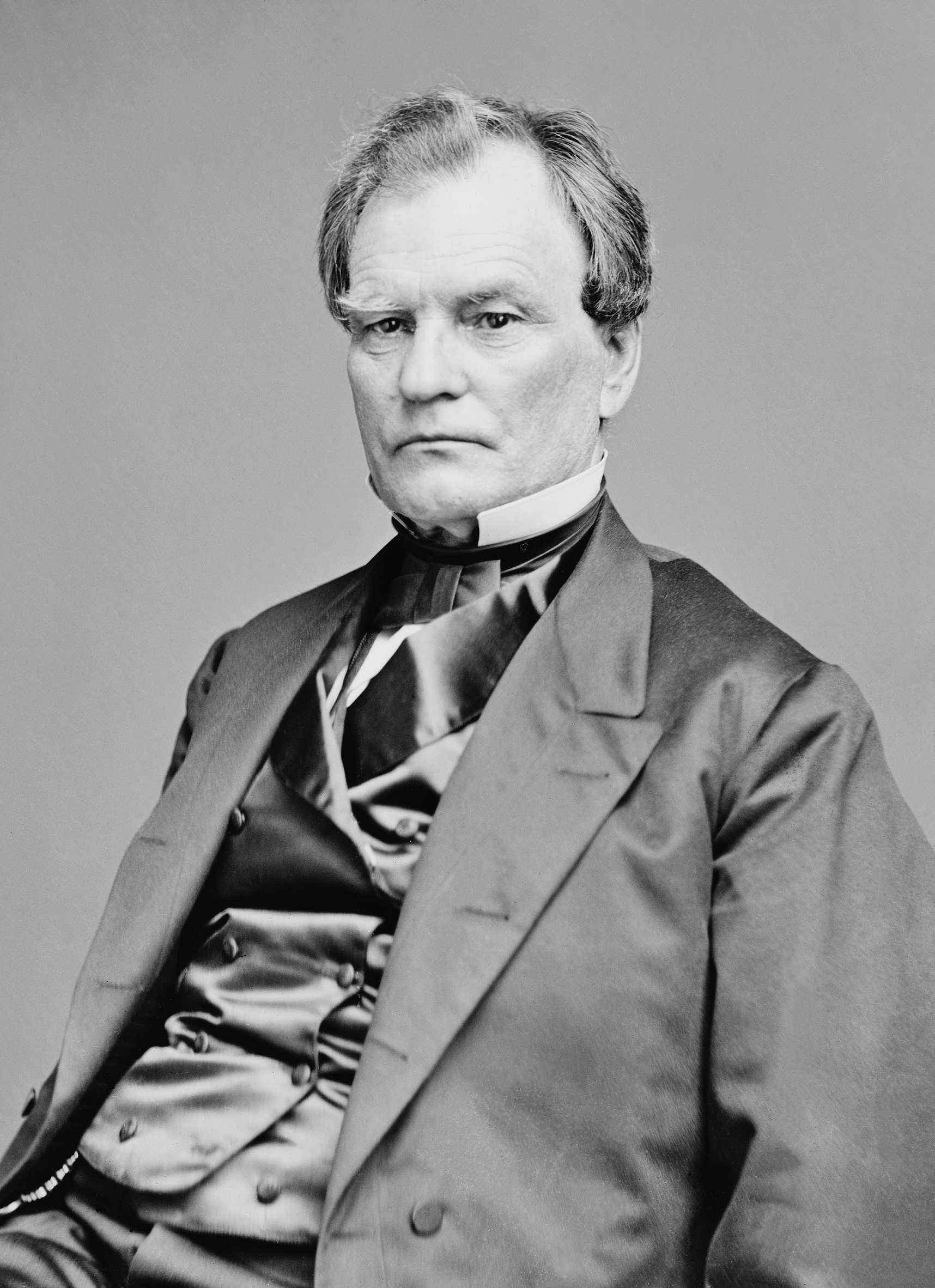
Sen.
Benjamin F. Wade

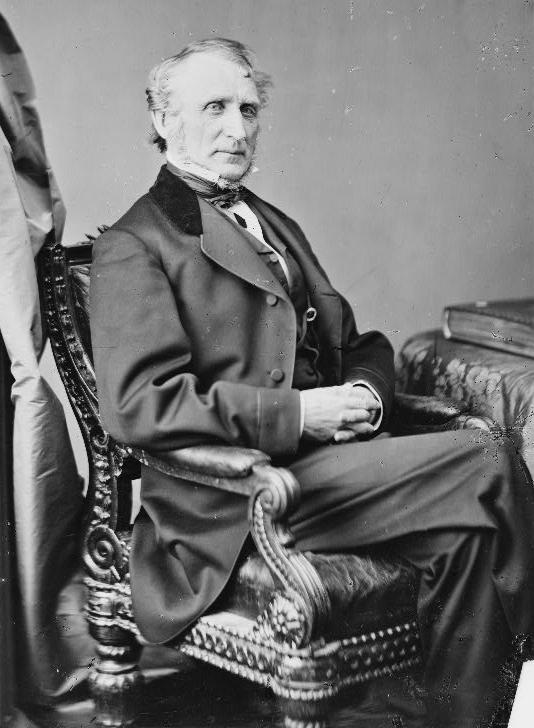
Rep.
John A. Bingham

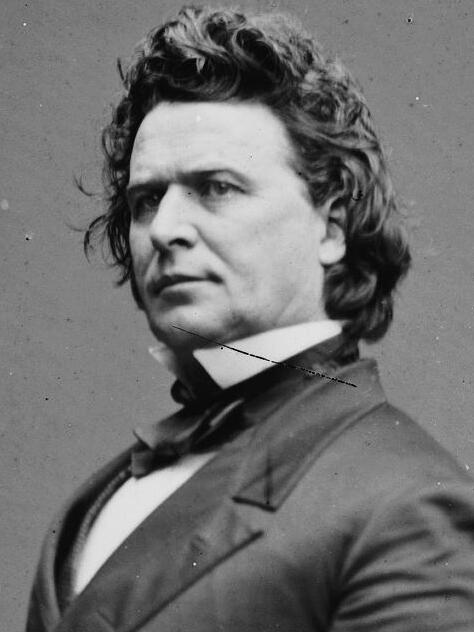
Rep.
James Mitchell Ashley

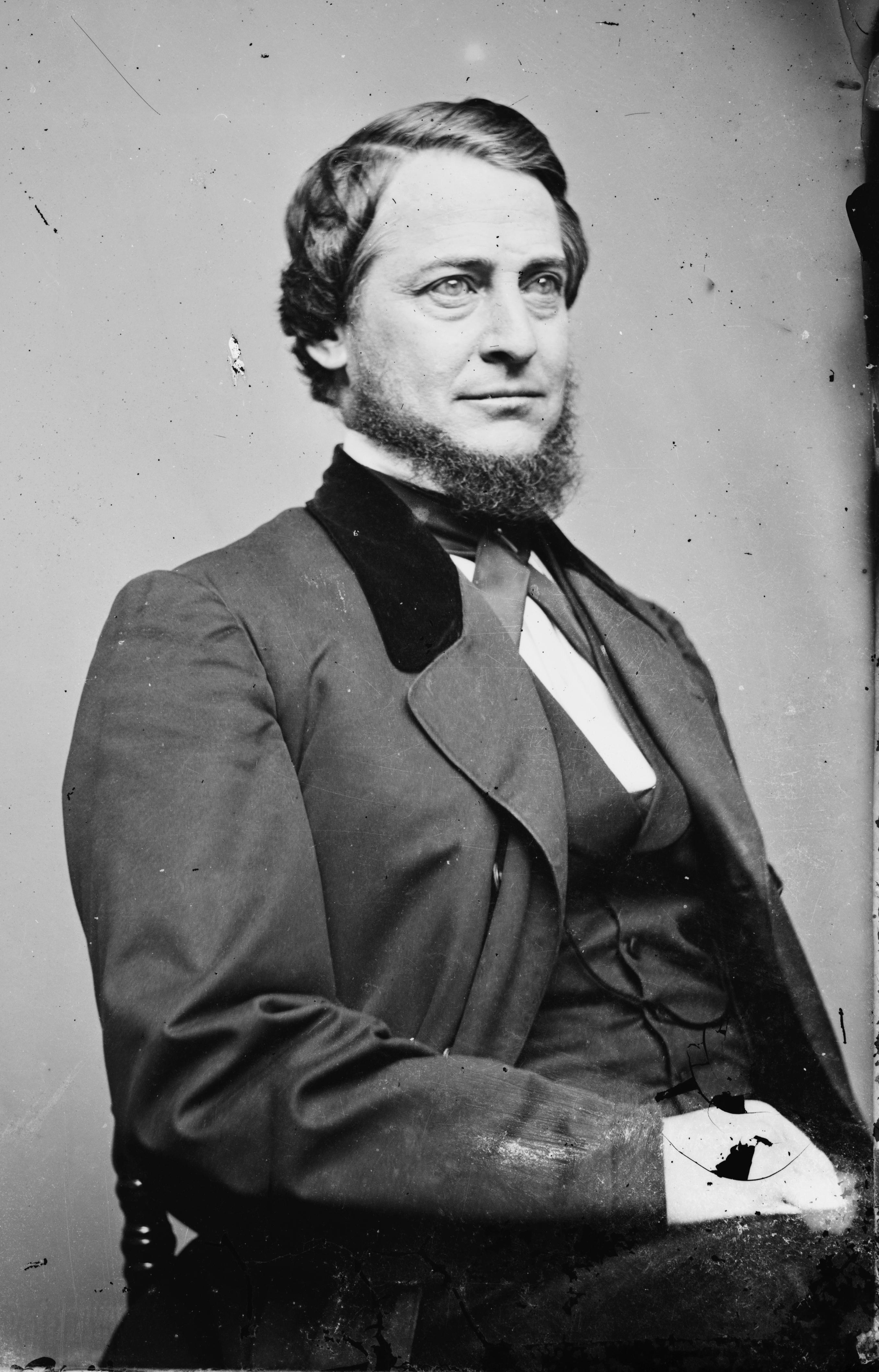
Rep.
Clement Vallandigham

== Civil War sites in Ohio ==
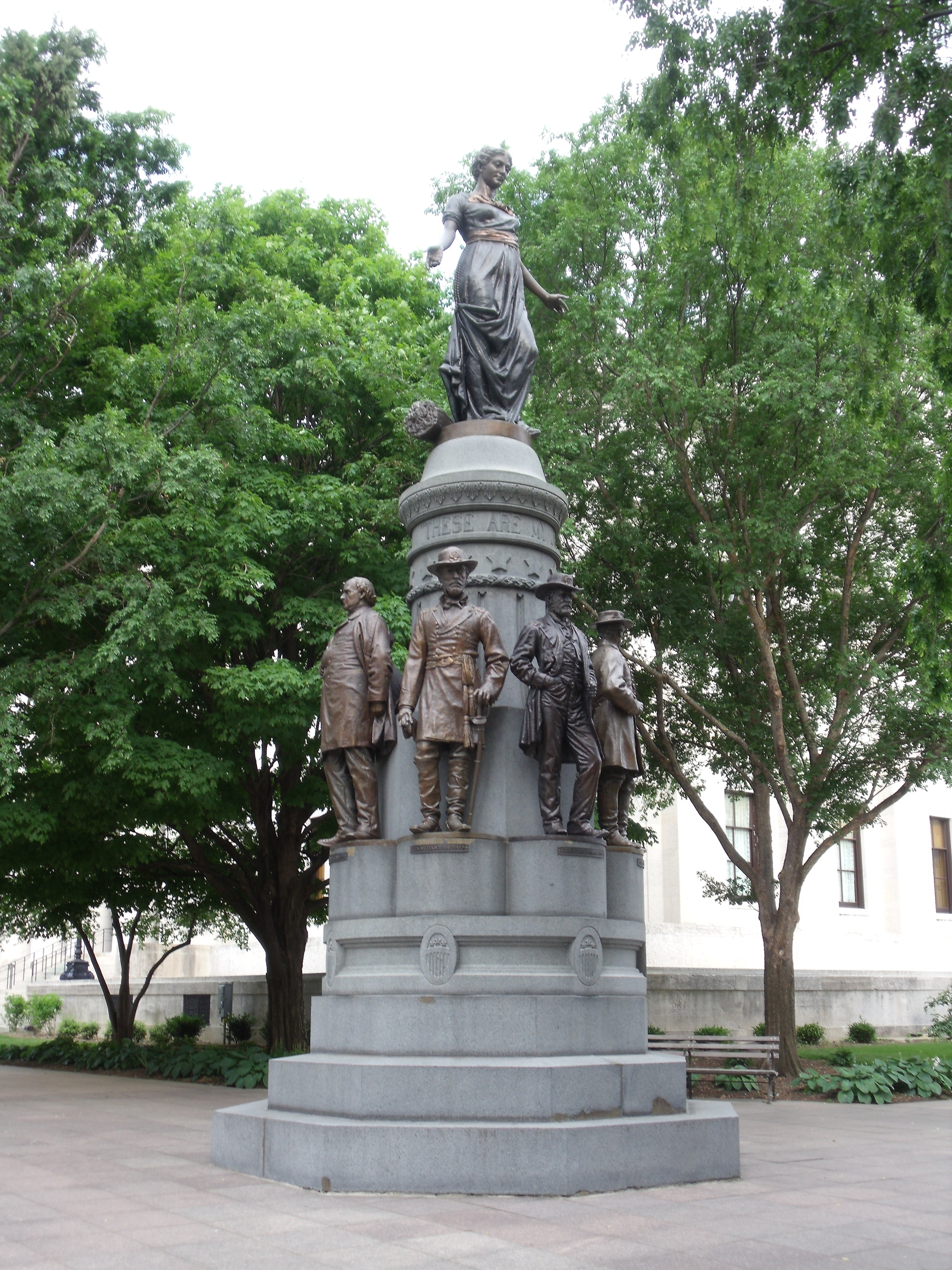
These Are My Jewels at the Ohio Statehouse, commemorating seven Ohioans who led Union efforts in the war

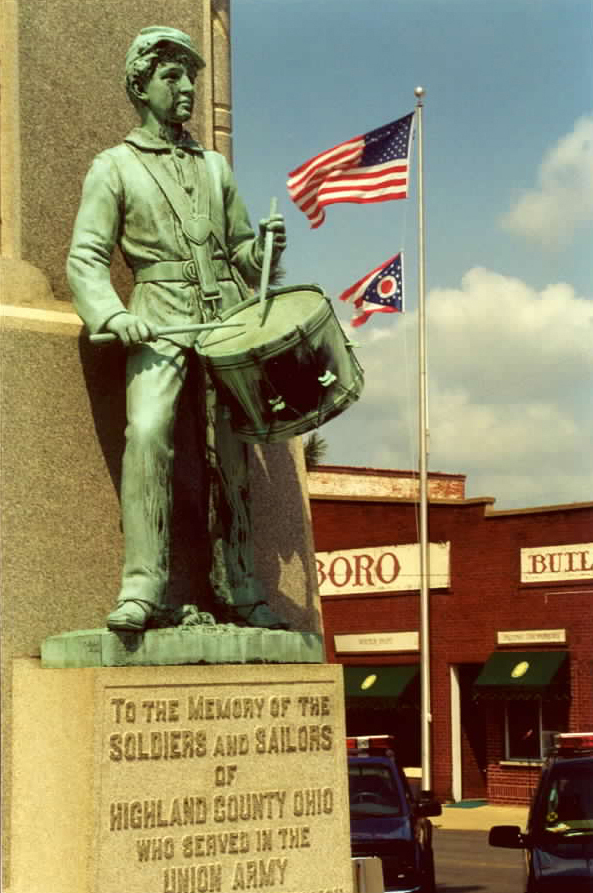
Monument in Hillsboro

The only battlefield of significance in Ohio is Buffington Island. Today it is threatened by development. This was the site of the largest fight of the July 1863 dash across Ohio by Confederate cavalry under John Hunt Morgan. The incursion was immortalized as "Morgan's Raid". A lesser engagement was the Battle of Salineville, which resulted in the capture of General Morgan. He and a number of his officers were incarcerated in the Ohio Penitentiary before escaping. Extreme south-central Ohio had previously been briefly invaded in early September 1862 by cavalry under Albert G. Jenkins.

Two important cemeteries for the dead from the Confederate States Army can be found in Ohio. One is at the prisoner-of-war camp on Johnson's Island, the most significant Civil War site in the state and intended mostly for officers. Estimates are that 10,000–15,000 Confederate officers and soldiers were incarcerated during the camp's three years of operations, with 2,500–3,000 at any one time. About 300 Confederates died and were buried there. A museum about Johnson's Island is located in Marblehead on the mainland. The Civil War buildings were dismantled shortly after the war. Archeological work by Heidelberg University has revealed the boundaries of the camp and new materials. At one time part of the island was used for a pleasure resort. Another cemetery is Camp Chase, which is located in the Hilltop neighborhood of Columbus, Ohio, where more than 2,000 Southerners were interred. Union Cemetery in Steubenville, Ohio, is the final resting place of Civil War soldiers, including several generals and colonels, including several of the "Fighting McCooks".

Monuments in Cincinnati and Mansfield commemorate the hundreds of Ohio soldiers who had been liberated from Southern prison camps, such as Cahaba and Andersonville, but perished in the Sultana steamboat tragedy. In the aftermath of war, women's groups were instrumental in raising money and organizing activities to create the memorials.

Many Ohio counties have Civil War monuments, statues, cannons, and similar memorials of their contributions to the Civil War effort. These are frequently located near the county courthouses. The Ohio State Capitol has a display of Civil War guns on its grounds. In downtown Cleveland's Public Square is the impressive Soldiers' and Sailors' Monument. Other large monuments are in Dayton, Hamilton, and Columbus. A large equestrian statue of General Sheridan is in the center of Somerset. New Rumley has a memorial to George Armstrong Custer. A number of Ohio Historical Markers throughout the state commemorate places and people associated with the Civil War.

Some of the homes of noted Civil War officers and political leaders have been restored and are open to the public as museums. Among these are the Daniel McCook House in Carrollton, Ohio. The Rutherford B. Hayes Presidential Center and Library in Fremont contains a number of Civil War relics and artifacts associated with General Hayes. Similarly, "Lawnfield", the home of James A. Garfield in Mentor, has a collection of Civil War items associated with the assassinated President.

The Ohio Historical Society maintains many of the archives of the war, including artifacts and many battle flags of individual regiments and artillery batteries. More relics can be found in the Western Reserve Historical Society's museum in Cleveland.

=== Prisons ===
Camp Chase Prison was a Union Army prison in Columbus. There was a plan among prisoners to revolt and escape in 1863. The prisoners expected support from Copperheads and Vallandigham, but never did revolt.

== See also ==
- List of Ohio Civil War units
- List of Ohio's American Civil War generals
- Cincinnati in the American Civil War
- Cleveland in the American Civil War
- Johnson's Island
- Uriah Brown, U.S. Medal of Honor winner
- Ephraim C. Dawes, Major in the 53rd Ohio Volunteer Infantry
