= Birchard =

Birchard is a surname. Notable people with the surname include:

- Joseph Birchard (1673–1755), American politician
- Matthew Birchard (1804–1876), American jurist
- May Birchard (died 1968), Canadian municipal politician and poverty activist
- Paul Birchard, American actor
- Ross Matthew Birchard alias Hudson Mohawke (born 1986), Scottish musician, producer and DJ
- Shannon Birchard (born 1994), Canadian curler

== See also ==
- Birchard Letter, a public letter from Abraham Lincoln to Matthew Birchard and eighteen other Ohio Democrats (1863)
- Rutherford Birchard Hayes (1822–1893), 19th president of the United States (1877 to 1881)
