= War Democrat =

American political faction

War Democrats
- President: Benjamin Franklin Butler
- Founded: 1860
- Dissolved: 1868
- Ideology: Abolitionism; Unionism
- National affiliation: Democratic Party

War Democrats in American politics of the 1860s were members of the Democratic Party who supported the Union and rejected the policies of the Copperheads, or Peace Democrats. The War Democrats demanded a more aggressive policy toward the Confederacy and supported the policies of Republican president Abraham Lincoln when the American Civil War broke out a few months after his victory in the 1860 presidential election.

== Ohio ==
In the critical state elections in Ohio in 1862, the Republicans and War Democrats formed the National Union Party. This led to victory over the Democrats, led by Copperhead Clement Vallandigham; however, it caused trouble for Radical Republican senator Benjamin Wade's reelection bid. War Democrats opposed Wade's radicalism, and Wade refused to make concessions to their point of view. He was narrowly reelected by the legislature.

In 1863, the Ohio gubernatorial campaign drew national attention. Ohio Republicans and War Democrats were dissatisfied with the leadership of Ohio governor David Tod, and turned to War Democrat John Brough after he made a strongly pro-Union speech in his hometown of Marietta on June 10, 1863. He was elected to the governorship that fall on a pro-Union ticket, partly due to his stronger support than Tod of the anti-slavery direction that the Northern war effort was taking. Brough telegraphed Washington that he had a 100,000 vote margin over Vallandigham. President Lincoln wired Brough: "Glory to God in the Highest. Ohio has saved the Nation."

== 1864 presidential campaign ==
Recognizing the importance of the War Democrats, the Republican Party changed its name for the national ticket in the 1864 presidential election, held during the Civil War. The National Union Party nominated for president the former Republican and incumbent president Lincoln and former War Democrat Andrew Johnson for vice president. As a result, many War Democrats could support Lincoln's Civil War policies while avoiding the Republican ticket. While a large number of Republican dissidents had maintained an entity separate from the National Union Party leading up to the 1864 election, they withdrew their ticket for fear that splitting the vote would allow the Copperhead Democrats and their "peace at all costs" ticket to possibly win the election. The National Union ticket won 42 of 54 available Senate seats and 149 of 193 available House of Representatives seats.

== 1865–1869 ==
Following Lincoln's assassination in April 1865, Johnson became president. Johnson's Reconstruction policies were lenient compared to those of the Radical Republicans. This dispute represented the conflict that many War Democrats faced, in that they supported the Union but did not wish to severely punish former Confederates or strongly protect the rights of former slaves. In the 1868 lead up to the first post-Civil War presidential election, President Johnson was a candidate for the Democratic Party presidential nomination; however, he finished second in the 22 ballots cast at the Democratic Convention, and lost the nomination to former New York governor Horatio Seymour, a former Copperhead. Lincoln appointed other War Democrats to high civil and military offices. Some joined the Republican Party, while others remained Democrats.

== Leadership ==
Prominent War Democrats included:

- Andrew Johnson, Senator from Tennessee and military Governor of Tennessee who was elected vice president in 1864 on a ticket with Lincoln and became president after Lincoln's assassination
- George Bancroft, historian and presidential speech writer
- John Brough, Governor of Ohio
- Benjamin Butler, Congressman from Massachusetts and Union General
- John Cochrane, Congressman and general
- Reverdy Johnson, Senator from Maryland
- John Alexander McClernand, Union General from Illinois
- John Adams Dix, James Buchanan's Secretary of the Treasury and Union General
- Stephen A. Douglas, Senator from Illinois and Democratic Party's Northern candidate in the presidential election of 1860, who died a few weeks into the war
- Joseph Holt, Buchanan's secretary of war and Lincoln's Judge Advocate General of the Army
- August Belmont, chair of the Democratic National Committee, 1860–1872
- E. E. Downham, Mayor of Alexandria, Virginia, prominent businessman, and miner
- Francis Kernan, Congressman from New York
- Michael Crawford Kerr, 32nd Speaker of the United States House of Representatives from December 6, 1875, to August 19, 1876
- John A. Logan, Congressman from Illinois and Union General
- George B. McClellan, railroad president, Union General and Democratic presidential nominee in 1864
- Joel Parker, Governor of New Jersey
- Edwards Pierrepont, appointed in 1875 as Attorney General by President Ulysses S. Grant
- William Rosecrans, led the Union at Chickamauga and was asked to run with Lincoln as a War Democrat in 1864
- Daniel Sickles, former New York Congressman who led III Corps at Gettysburg
- David Tod, Governor of Ohio
- Edwin M. Stanton, Buchanan's Attorney General and Lincoln's Secretary of War who switched to the Republican Party in 1862
