= 1863 Ohio gubernatorial election =

- October 13, 1863
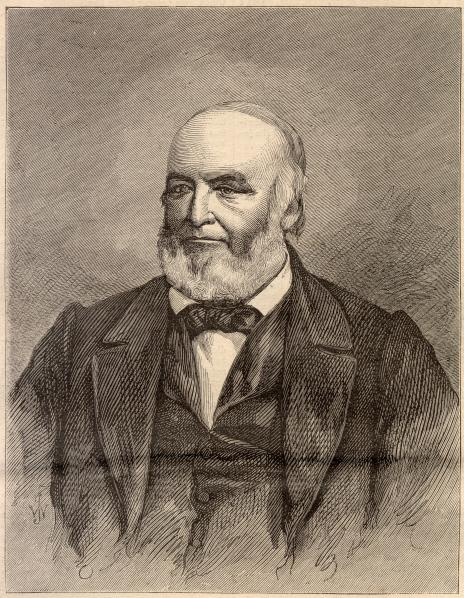

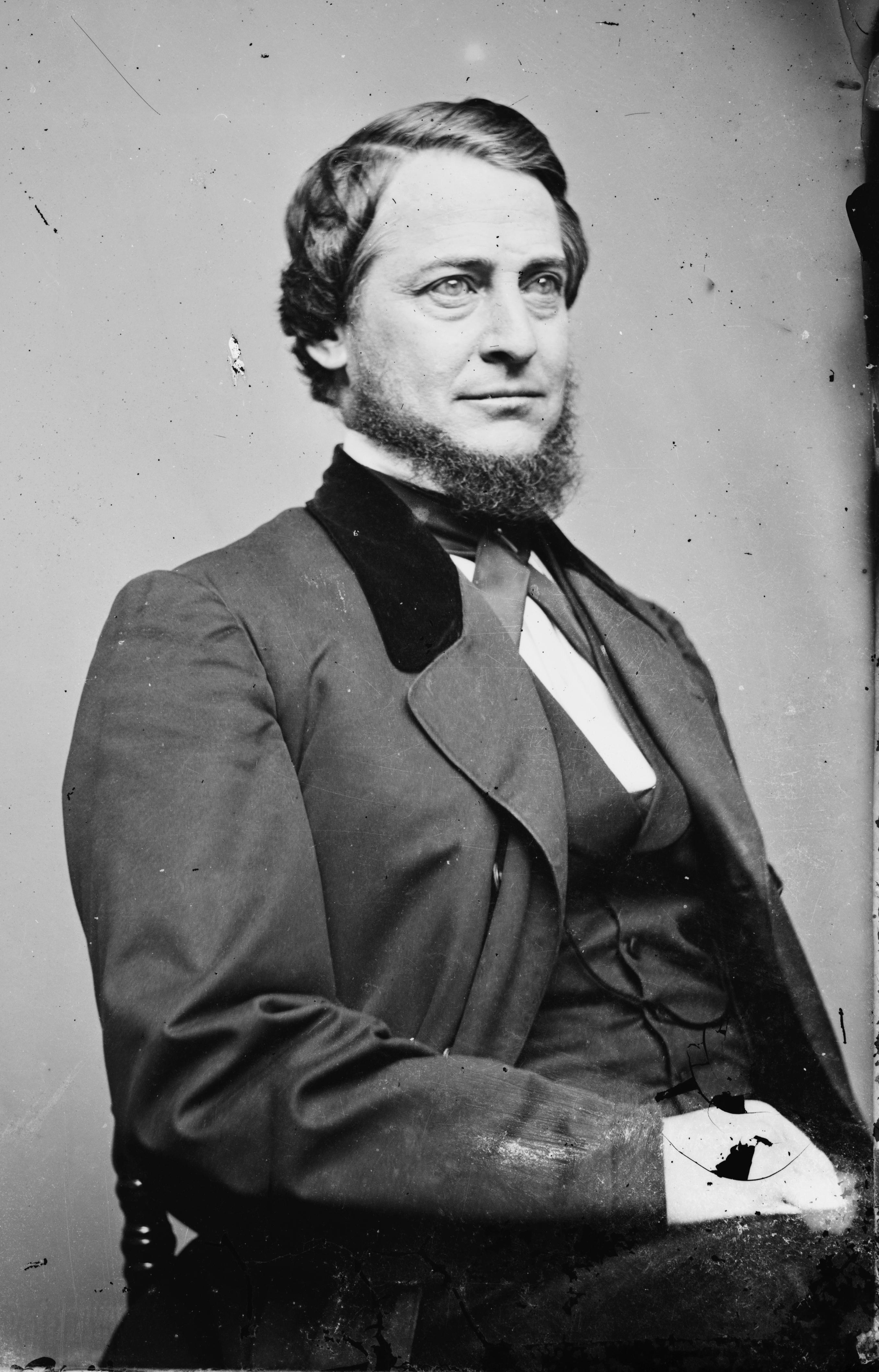
Nominee	John Brough	Clement Vallandigham
Party	National Union	Democratic
Running mate	Charles Anderson	George E. Pugh
Popular vote	288,856	187,728
Percentage	60.61%	39.39%
County results
Brough
50–60%
60–70%
70–80%
80–90%
90–100%
Vallandigham
50–60%
60–70%
Governor before election
David Tod
National Union
Elected Governor
John Brough
National Union

The 1863 Ohio gubernatorial election was held on October 13, 1863. National Union nominee John Brough defeated Democratic nominee Clement Vallandigham with 60.61% of the vote. The campaign was dominated by Vallandingham's May 5 arrest, conviction, and deportation for a speech critical of President Abraham Lincoln and the conduct of the American Civil War. He was nominated in absentia by the Democratic Party.

== General election ==
=== Candidates ===
- John Brough, National Union
- Clement Vallandigham, Democratic

=== Results ===
1863 Ohio gubernatorial election
Party	Candidate	Votes	%	±%
National Union	John Brough	288,856	60.61%	
Democratic	Clement Vallandigham	187,728	39.39%	
Majority		101,128		
Turnout				
National Union hold		Swing		
