= John Brough =

26th Governor of Ohio from 1864 to 1865

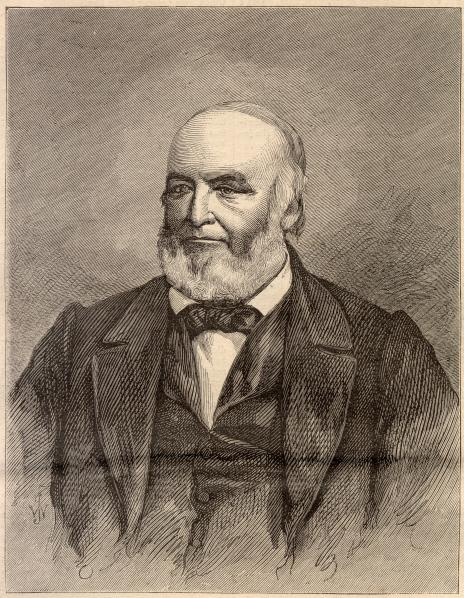

26th Governor of Ohio
- In office January 11, 1864 – August 29, 1865
- Lieutenant: Charles Anderson
- Preceded by: David Tod
- Succeeded by: Charles Anderson

5th Ohio State Auditor
- In office March 15, 1839 – March 15, 1845
- Preceded by: John A. Bryan
- Succeeded by: John Woods

Member of the Ohio House of Representatives from the Fairfield & Hocking counties district
- In office December 3, 1838 – March 14, 1839
- Preceded by: William Medill; John Graybill
- Succeeded by: James Spencer; Lewis Hite

Personal details
- Born: September 17, 1811 Marietta, Ohio, U.S.
- Died: August 29, 1865 (aged 53) Cleveland, Ohio, U.S.
- Resting place: Woodland Cemetery (Cleveland)
- Party: Union; Democrat
- Spouse(s): Achsah P. Pruden; Caroline A. Nelson
- Children: 7
- Education: Ohio University
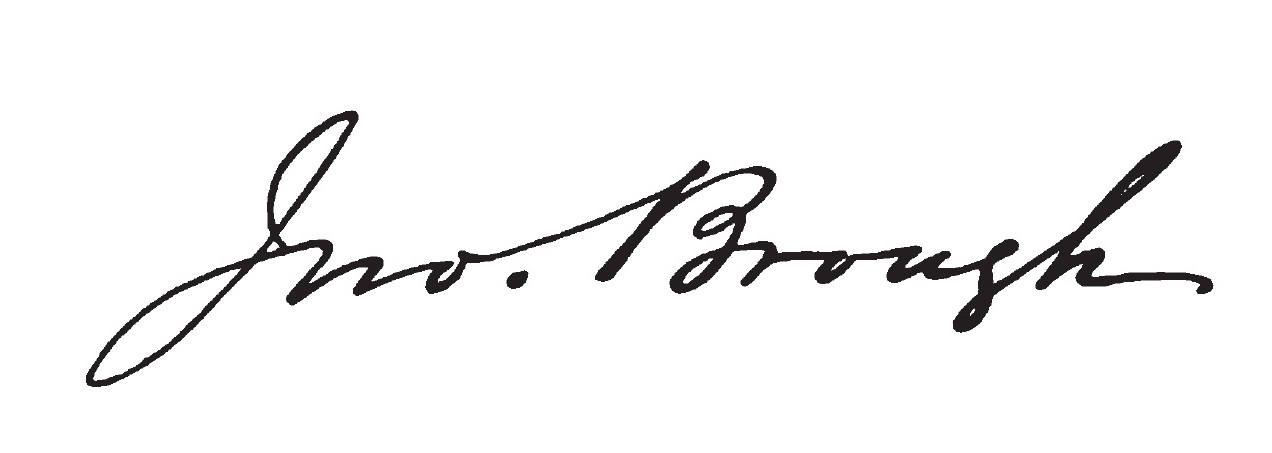
- Signature

John Brough (/ˈbrʌf/; rhymes with "huff") (September 17, 1811 – August 29, 1865) was a War Democrat politician from Ohio. He served as the 26th governor of Ohio during the final years of the American Civil War, dying in office of gangrene shortly after the war concluded.

== Early life and career ==
Born in Marietta, Ohio, to an English immigrant and a Pennsylvania-born mother, Brough was orphaned at the age of 11. To support himself, he became a printer's apprentice, and later received three years of part-time education at Ohio University, where he worked part-time as a reporter for the Athens Mirror. He rose to become a newspaper publisher in Marietta and then in Lancaster, where he and his brother Charles purchased the Ohio Eagle, a paper that espoused the views of the Democratic Party.

Brough served two years as Clerk of the Ohio Senate (where he also served as the capital correspondent for his newspaper, as well as the Ohio Statesman). He was elected as a Democrat to the Ohio House of Representatives in 1837, representing the Fairfield-Hocking district, and served from 1838 to 1839, chairing the Committee on Banks and Currency. He then took office as State Auditor, serving until 1845, when the Whigs swept most of the state's Democrats out of office in the Election of 1844.

He was a trustee of Ohio University from 1840 to 1843.

In 1841, he and his brother bought the Cincinnati Advertiser and renamed it the Cincinnati Enquirer. Brough then moved to Indiana, where he entered the railroad business and became President of the Madison and Indianapolis Railway in 1848. He later presided over the Bellefontaine and Indiana Railway.

In Madison, Indiana, he was remembered for leading the railroad through a period in which it made Madison the leading pork packing city in the nation, but the line then fell prey to competition. His attempt to combat competing lines was the construction of two tunnels as part of an effort to avoid a steep incline at Madison. The company spent more than $300,000 (~$7.98 million in 2024) on construction during two years, before the effort was stopped in 1855. The project was known locally as "Brough's Folly" and he left in 1853 when the Madison line underwent a short-lived merger with another railroad company.

Brough was a very large and corpulent man, as well as being a hard worker. The railroad company named one of its engines "John Brough" in his honor When it arrived in Madison on May 10, 1850, the Madison Courier of May 11 made the following comment that was printed in the Scientific American of June 1, 1850. "We are told this engine is called the John Brough on account of its great weight and for the great amount of business it is capable of doing."

== Governor of Ohio ==
Ohio Unionists dissatisfied with the leadership of Ohio Governor David Tod turned to Brough after he made a strongly pro-Union speech in his hometown of Marietta on June 10, 1863. He was elected to the governorship that fall on the Union Party ticket, partly due to his stronger support than Tod of the anti-slavery direction that the Northern war effort was taking. Brough is the last Ohio governor to date who was neither a Democrat nor a Republican. Brough defeated Copperhead leader Clement Vallandigham in the general election. This prompted President Abraham Lincoln to wire Brough, "Glory to God in the Highest. Ohio has saved the Nation."

Brough took office in January 1864. Ohio historian Walter Havighurst described Brough as being "a big bull of a man with driving energy," and Richard H. Abbott wrote that he "had a reputation for rough and ready politics with a temperament to match... [he was] a blunt, outspoken, rude man who loved to chew tobacco [and thus] presented quite a contrast with his two handsome and dignified predecessors, William Dennison and David Tod."

As governor, Brough strongly supported the Lincoln Administration's war efforts and was key to persuading other Midwestern governors to raise 100-day regiments in early 1864 to release more seasoned troops for duty in Gen. Ulysses S. Grant's spring campaign. Ohio contributed more than 34,000 troops, and was the only one of the five participating states (the others were Indiana, Illinois, Iowa and Wisconsin) to exceed its quota. Brough supported Lincoln's reelection in 1864, despite the machinations of Ohio's favorite son Salmon P. Chase, and worked tirelessly to support the state's soldiers in the field. When Chase resigned as Secretary of the Treasury, Brough was offered the position but declined it to remain as governor.

With the conclusion of the war in 1865, the Union Party dissolved, and the now-dominant Republicans looked elsewhere for a candidate. On June 15, Brough announced that he would not seek the gubernatorial nomination again but would not decline it if offered; it was not. Later that summer, Brough stumbled in the State House yard, bruising his hand and badly spraining his ankle. Using a cane caused inflammation over time and gangrene eventually set in.

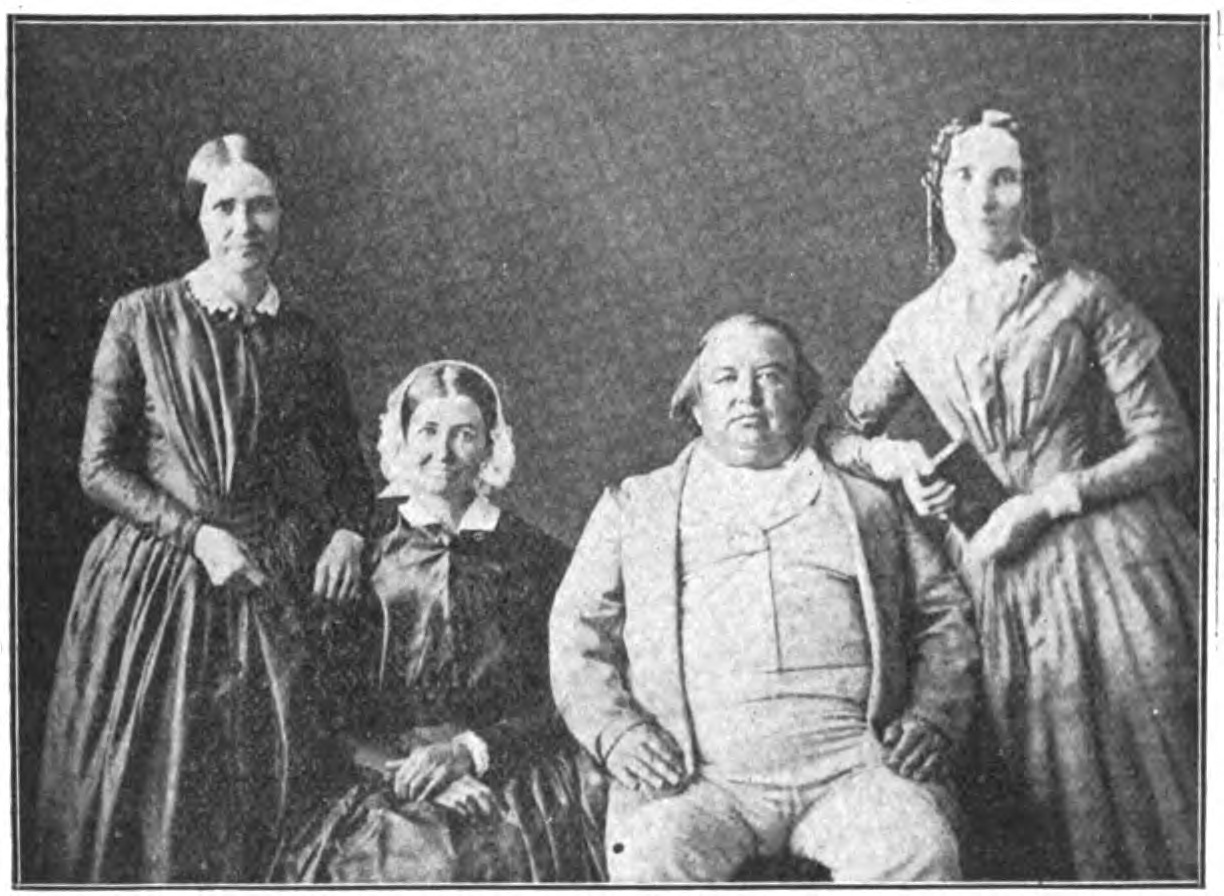
Brough's sisters Mary and Jane, Brough, Caroline - his second wife, circa 1860.

Abbott wrote that Brough "had given his full efforts to serving his state... [and did so] with energy and ability." Historian Richard C. Knopf wrote, "Whatever may be said of Brough's partisanship and his lack of personal dignity, one must assess in his favor the qualities of integrity, perseverance, and public spiritedness."

== Personal life and death ==
Brough was twice married and had seven children. In 1832, Brough married Achsah P. Pruden of Athens. She had two children. She died September 8, 1838 at Lancaster. Brough married Caroline A. Nelson, of Columbus, at Lewistown, Pennsylvania in 1843. She had five children.

John Brough died in office on August 29, 1865, 19 days short of his 54th birthday. He was buried at Woodland Cemetery in Cleveland.

Brough is honored with a full-size bronze depiction inside the Cuyahoga County Soldiers' and Sailors' Monument in Cleveland, Ohio for his service as governor during the Civil War.

== Bibliography ==
- Eicher, John H.; Eicher, David J.; Simon, John Y. (2001). Civil War High Commands. Palo Alto, Calif.: Stanford University Press. ISBN 9780804736411.

Political offices
Preceded by David Tod	Governor of Ohio; 1864–1865	Succeeded by Charles Anderson
Party political offices
Preceded by David Tod	Republican Party nominee for Governor of Ohio; 1863	Succeeded by Jacob Dolson Cox
