= Birchard Letter =

Letter from Abraham Lincoln to Ohio Democrats

The Birchard Letter (June 29, 1863), was a public letter from United States President Abraham Lincoln to Matthew Birchard and eighteen other Ohio Democrats in which Lincoln defended the administration's treatment of antiwar agitators, and offered to release Clement Vallandigham if a majority of those to whom the letter was addressed would subscribe to three pledges in connection with the prosecution of the American Civil War.

== Background and result ==
On May 5, 1863, Ohio Democrat Clement Vallandigham was arrested under the authority of General Order Number 38, issued by Union General Ambrose E. Burnside. Controversy erupted over the arrest of a Democratic politician by military authorities.

On June 14, 1863, Ohio Governor David Tod sent a telegram from Columbus, Ohio to Lincoln. Tod stated "Allow me to express the hope that you will treat the Vallandigham Committee about to call upon you with the contempt they richly merit. The Vallandigham faction will be annihilated at our coming election".

On June 25, 1863, Lincoln's Secretary of the Treasury Salmon P. Chase sent him a note advising him that a delegation from Ohio was in Washington. Chase advised Lincoln "that what is said by them or replied to them should be only in writing". Lincoln met with the delegation the same day.

On June 29, Lincoln replied to Birchard in writing. Lincoln wrote "I certainly do not know that Mr. V. has specifically, and by direct language, advised against enlistments, and in favor of desertion, and resistance to drafting. We all know that combinations, armed in some instances, to resist the arrest of deserters, began several months ago; that more recently the like has appeared in resistance to the enrolment preparatory to a draft; and that quite a number of assassinations have occurred from the same animus. These had to be met by military force, and this again has led to bloodshed and death. And now under a sense of responsibility more weighty and enduring than any which is merely official, I solemnly declare my belief that this hindrance, of the military, including maiming and murder, is due to the course in which Mr. V. has been engaged, in a greater degree than to any other cause; and is due to him personally, in a greater degree than to any other one man." There was draft resistance in Ohio and other states of the Union.

The three pledges Lincoln asked for in exchange for a revocation of his deportation order of Vallandigham to the confederacy were:

1. That there is now a rebellion in the United States, the object and tendency of which is to destroy the national Union; and that in your opinion, an army and navy are constitutional means for suppressing that rebellion.

2. That no one of you will do any thing which in his own judgment, will tend to hinder the increase, or favor the decrease, or lessen the efficiency of the army or navy, while engaged in the effort to suppress that rebellion; and,

3. That each of you will, in his sphere, do all he can to have the officers, soldiers, and seamen of the army and navy, while engaged in the effort to suppress the rebellion, paid, fed, clad, and otherwise well provided and supported.

On July 1, 1863, Birchard replied to Lincoln. His letter concluded with a reply to Lincoln's offer of subscription to certain pledges: "they have asked the revocation of the order of banishment, not as a favor, but as a right due to the people of Ohio". In his letter, Birchard cited habeas corpus. On September 15, 1863, Lincoln made a proclamation suspending habeas corpus.

Prior to the Birchard letter, Lincoln also sent a letter to Erastus Corning regarding the Vallandigham controversy on June 12, 1863.

== Sources ==
- Dictionary of American History by James Truslow Adams, New York: Charles Scribner's Sons, 1940
