= General Order Number 38 =

General Order Number 38 was issued by American Union general Ambrose Burnside on April 13, 1863, during the American Civil War while Burnside commanded the Department of the Ohio. Among other issues, the order attempted to make it illegal to criticize the war within that Department:

That hereafter all persons found within our lines who commit acts for the benefit of the enemies of our country, will be tried as spies or traitors, and, if convicted, will suffer death. This order includes the following classes of persons:

...

The habit of declaring sympathies for the enemy will no longer be tolerated in the department. Persons committing such offences will be at once arrested, with a view to being tried as above stated, or sent beyond our lines into the lines of their friends.

Any kind of opposition to the war — such as that expressed by the Copperheads peace movement — was considered sympathy to the enemy, and the order was immediately used as justification to arrest Ohio Representative Vallandigham, a prominent leader in the movement (in fact, he was arrested for criticizing the order itself) and to try him in a military court.

Burnside’s order inspired a political campaign song that mentioned Clement Vallandigham:

O, brothers, don't forget the time
When Burnside was our fate,
And laws were superseded
By order 38.
Then like a free-born western man,
Our Val spoke bold and true,
O, when he’s chosen governor
What will poor Burnside do.
Wont he skedaddle,
As he’s well used to do.
