= 1999 term opinions of the Supreme Court of the United States =

October 1999 to October 2000 opinions

The 1999 term of the Supreme Court of the United States began October 4, 1999, and concluded October 1, 2000. The table illustrates which opinion was filed by each justice in each case and which justices joined each opinion.

== Table key ==
Delivered the court's opinion

Joined the court's opinion

Filed a concurrence

Joined a concurrence

Filed a dissent

Joined a dissent

Filed a concurrence/dissent

Joined a concurrence/dissent

Did not participate in the decision
- Decisions that do not note an argument date were decided without oral argument. Decisions that do not note a justice delivering the court's opinion are per curiam.
- Multiple concurrences and dissents within a case are numbered, with joining votes numbered accordingly. Justices frequently join multiple opinions in a single case; each vote is subdivided accordingly.
- An asterisk ( * ) in the court's opinion denotes that it was only a majority in part or a plurality. An asterisk in a joining vote denotes that the justice joined it only in part.
- A dash ( - ) denotes that the justice voted without filing or joining an opinion.

== 1999 term opinions ==
#	Case name and citation	Argued	Decided	Rehnquist	Stevens	O'Connor	Scalia	Kennedy	Souter	Thomas	Ginsburg	Breyer
1	Brancato v. Gunn, 528 U.S. 1		October 12, 1999									
2	Antonelli v. Caridine, 528 U.S. 3		October 12, 1999									
3	Judd v. United States Dist. Court for Western Dist. of Tex., 528 U.S. 5		October 12, 1999									
4	Dempsey v. Martin, 528 U.S. 7		October 12, 1999									
5	Prunty v. Brooks, 528 U.S. 9		October 12, 1999									
6	Flippo v. West Virginia, 528 U.S. 11		October 18, 1999									
7	In re Bauer, 528 U.S. 16		October 18, 1999									
8	Texas v. Lesage, 528 U.S. 18		November 29, 1999									
9	Fiore v. White, 528 U.S. 23	October 12, 1999	November 30, 1999									
10	Los Angeles Police Dept. v. United Reporting Publishing Corp., 528 U.S. 32	October 13, 1999	December 7, 1999									
11	Drye v. United States, 528 U.S. 49	November 8, 1999	December 7, 1999									
12	Kimel v. Florida Board of Regents, 528 U.S. 62	October 13, 1999	January 11, 2000	*	*		*	*	*	*	*	*
13	New York v. Hill, 528 U.S. 110	November 2, 1999	January 11, 2000									
14	Illinois v. Wardlow, 528 U.S. 119	November 2, 1999	January 12, 2000									
15	Reno v. Condon, 528 U.S. 141	November 10, 1999	January 12, 2000									
16	Martinez v. Court of Appeal of California, Fourth Appellate District, 528 U.S. 152	November 9, 1999	January 12, 2000									
17	Friends of the Earth, Inc. v. Laidlaw Environmental Services, Inc., 528 U.S. 167	October 12, 1999	January 12, 2000									
18	Adarand Constructors, Inc. v. Slater, 528 U.S. 216		January 12, 2000									
19	Weeks v. Angelone, 528 U.S. 225	December 6, 1999	January 19, 2000						*			
20	Gutierrez v. Ada, 528 U.S. 250	December 6, 1999	January 19, 2000									
21	Smith v. Robbins, 528 U.S. 259	October 5, 1999	January 19, 2000									
22	United States v. Martinez-Salazar, 528 U.S. 304	November 29, 1999	January 19, 2000									
23	Reno v. Bossier Parish School Bd., 528 U.S. 320	October 6, 1999	January 24, 2000	*		*		*		*		
24	Nixon v. Shrink Missouri Government PAC, 528 U.S. 377	October 5, 1999	January 24, 2000									
25	Baral v. United States, 528 U.S. 431	January 18, 2000	February 22, 2000									
26	Weisgram v. Marley Co., 528 U.S. 440	January 18, 2000	February 22, 2000									
27	Hunt-Wesson, Inc. v. Franchise Tax Board of California, 528 U.S. 458	January 12, 2000	February 22, 2000									
28	Roe v. Flores-Ortega, 528 U.S. 470	November 1, 1999	February 23, 2000		*				*		*	
29	Rice v. Cayetano, 528 U.S. 495	October 6, 1999	February 23, 2000								*	
30	Rotella v. Wood, 528 U.S. 549	November 3, 1999	February 23, 2000									
31	Village of Willowbrook v. Olech, 528 U.S. 562	January 10, 2000	February 23, 2000									
32	Shalala v. Illinois Council on Long Term Care, Inc., 529 U.S. 1	November 08, 1999	February 29, 2000				*					
33	United States v. Johnson, 529 U.S. 53	December 8, 1999	March 1, 2000									
34	Portuondo v. Agard, 529 U.S. 61	November 1, 1999	March 6, 2000									
35	United States v. Locke, 529 U.S. 89	December 7, 1999	March 6, 2000									
36	FDA v. Brown & Williamson Tobacco Corp., 529 U.S. 120	December 1, 1999	March 21, 2000									
37	Cortez Byrd Chips, Inc. v. Bill Harbert Construction Co., 529 U.S. 193	January 10, 2000	March 21, 2000									
38	Wal-Mart Stores, Inc. v. Samara Brothers, Inc., 529 U.S. 205	January 19, 2000	March 22, 2000									
39	Board of Regents of the University of Wisconsin System v. Southworth, 529 U.S. 217	November 9, 1999	March 22, 2000									
40	Garner v. Jones, 529 U.S. 244	January 11, 2000	March 28, 2000									
41	Florida v. J. L., 529 U.S. 266	February 29, 2000	March 28, 2000									
42	City of Erie v. Pap's A. M., 529 U.S. 277	November 10, 1999	March 29, 2000			*			*			
43	Free v. Abbott Laboratories, Inc., 529 U.S. 333	March 27, 2000	April 3, 2000									
44	Bond v. United States, 529 U.S. 334	February 29, 2000	April 17, 2000									
45	Norfolk Southern Railroad Co. v. Shanklin, 529 U.S. 344	March 1, 2000	April 17, 2000									
46	Terry Williams v. Taylor, 529 U.S. 362	October 4, 1999	April 18, 2000	2	1*	1* / 2*	2*	1* / 2	1	2	1	1
47	Michael Williams v. Taylor, 529 U.S. 420	February 28, 2000	April 18, 2000									
48	Edwards v. Carpenter, 529 U.S. 446	February 28, 2000	April 25, 2000									
49	Nelson v. Adams USA, Inc., 529 U.S. 460	March 27, 2000	April 25, 2000									
50	Slack v. McDaniel, 529 U.S. 473	March 29, 2000	April 26, 2000	*		*	*		*	*	*	*
51	Beck v. Prupis, 529 U.S. 494	November 3, 1999	April 26, 2000									
52	Carmell v. Texas, 529 U.S. 513	November 30, 1999	May 1, 2000									
53	Christensen v. Harris County, 529 U.S. 576	February 23, 2000	May 1, 2000				*					
54	United States v. Morrison, 529 U.S. 598	January 11, 2000	May 15, 2000						*		*	
55	Fischer v. United States (2000), 529 U.S. 667	February 22, 2000	May 15, 2000									
56	Johnson v. United States, 529 U.S. 694	February 22, 2000	May 15, 2000					*				
57	Public Lands Council v. Babbitt, 529 U.S. 728	March 1, 2000	May 15, 2000									
58	Ohler v. United States, 529 U.S. 753	March 20, 2000	May 22, 2000									
59	Vermont Agency of Natural Resources v. United States ex rel. Stevens, 529 U.S. 765	November 29, 1999	May 22, 2000									
60	United States v. Playboy Entertainment Group, Inc., 529 U.S. 803	November 30, 1999	May 22, 2000									
61	Jones v. United States, 529 U.S. 848	March 21, 2000	May 22, 2000									
62	Geier v. American Honda Motor Co., 529 U.S. 861	December 7, 1999	May 22, 2000									
63	Hartford Underwriters Ins. Co. v. Union Planters Bank, N.A., 530 U.S. 1	March 20, 2000	May 30, 2000									
64	Raleigh v. Illinois Dept. of Revenue, 530 U.S. 15	April 17, 2000	May 30, 2000									
65	United States v. Hubbell, 530 U.S. 27	February 22, 2000	June 5, 2000									
66	Troxel v. Granville, 530 U.S. 57	January 12, 2000	June 5, 2000			*						
67	Sims v. Apfel, 530 U.S. 103	March 28, 2000	June 5, 2000			*				*		
68	Castillo v. United States, 530 U.S. 120	April 24, 2000	June 5, 2000				*					
69	Reeves v. Sanderson Plumbing Products, Inc., 530 U.S. 133	March 21, 2000	June 12, 2000									
70	Ramdass v. Angelone, 530 U.S. 156	April 18, 2000	June 12, 2000					*				
71	Pegram v. Herdrich, 530 U.S. 211	February 23, 2000	June 12, 2000									
72	Harris Trust and Savings Bank v. Salomon Smith Barney Inc., 530 U.S. 238	April 17, 2000	June 12, 2000									
73	Carter v. United States (2000), 530 U.S. 255	April 19, 2000	June 12, 2000									
74	Santa Fe Independent School District v. Doe, 530 U.S. 290	March 29, 2000	June 19, 2000									
75	Miller v. French, 530 U.S. 327	April 18, 2000	June 19, 2000						*		*	
76	Crosby v. National Foreign Trade Council, 530 U.S. 363	March 22, 2000	June 19, 2000									
77	Arizona v. California, 530 U.S. 392	April 25, 2000	June 19, 2000									
78	Dickerson v. United States, 530 U.S. 428	April 19, 2000	June 26, 2000									
79	Apprendi v. New Jersey, 530 U.S. 466	March 28, 2000	June 26, 2000				*					
80	California Democratic Party v. Jones, 530 U.S. 567	April 24, 2000	June 26, 2000									
81	Mobil Oil Exploration & Producing Southeast, Inc. v. United States, 530 U.S. 604	March 22, 2000	June 26, 2000									
82	Boy Scouts of America v. Dale, 530 U.S. 640	April 26, 2000	June 28, 2000									
83	Hill v. Colorado, 530 U.S. 703	January 19, 2000	June 28, 2000									
84	Mitchell v. Helms, 530 U.S. 793	December 1, 1999	June 28, 2000							*		
85	Stenberg v. Carhart, 530 U.S. 914	April 25, 2000	June 28, 2000									
#	Case name and citation	Argued	Decided	Rehnquist	Stevens	O'Connor	Scalia	Kennedy	Souter	Thomas	Ginsburg	Breyer

== 1999 term membership and statistics ==
This was the fourteenth term of Chief Justice Rehnquist's tenure, and the sixth consecutive term in which the Court's membership had not changed.

Justice		Appointment history		Agreement with judgment		Opinions filed				
Seniority	Name	President	Date confirmed	%	#					Total
Chief Justice	William Rehnquist	Richard Nixon	January 7, 1972	89.4%	76/85	9	0	2	3	14
Associate Justice	John Paul Stevens	Gerald Ford	December 19, 1975	61.2%	52/85	7	7	2	22	38
Associate Justice	Sandra Day O'Connor	Ronald Reagan	September 25, 1981	95.2%	80/84	8	6	0	1	15
Associate Justice	Antonin Scalia	Ronald Reagan	September 26, 1986	82.4%	70/85	8	8	1	8	25
Associate Justice	Anthony Kennedy	Ronald Reagan	February 18, 1988	88.2%	75/85	10	5	0	4	19
Associate Justice	David Souter	George H. W. Bush	October 9, 1990	77.6%	66/85	8	5	4	6	23
Associate Justice	Clarence Thomas	George H. W. Bush	October 23, 1991	84.7%	72/85	8	8	1	4	21
Associate Justice	Ruth Bader Ginsburg	Bill Clinton	August 10, 1993	72.9%	62/85	8	4	1	5	18
Associate Justice	Stephen Breyer	Bill Clinton	August 3, 1994	80%	68/85	8	8	0	9	25
Notes on statistics: Opinion counts only include the bench opinions listed above; opinions relating to orders or in-chambers opinions are not included.; Agreement with the Court's judgment does not guarantee agreement with the reasoning expressed in its opinion. A justice is not considered in agreement if they dissented even in part. Agreement percentages are based only on the listed cases in which a justice participated and are rounded to the nearest one-tenth of one percentage point.						Totals				
Notes on statistics: Opinion counts only include the bench opinions listed above; opinions relating to orders or in-chambers opinions are not included.; Agreement with the Court's judgment does not guarantee agreement with the reasoning expressed in its opinion. A justice is not considered in agreement if they dissented even in part. Agreement percentages are based only on the listed cases in which a justice participated and are rounded to the nearest one-tenth of one percentage point.						74	51	11	62	198
