= Jones v. United States =

Jones v. United States may refer to:

United States Supreme Court cases:

- Jones v. United States (1849), 48 U.S. 681 (1849)
- Jones v. United States (1874), 85 U.S. 662 (1874)
- Jones v. United States (1878), 96 U.S. 24 (1878)
- Jones v. United States (1890), 137 U.S. 202 (1890), interpreting Guano Islands Act's stated criminal jurisdiction as constitutional
- Jones v. United States (1922), 258 U.S. 40 (1922)
- Jones v. United States (1958), 357 U.S. 493 (1958)
- Jones v. United States (1960), 362 U.S. 257 (1960)
- Jones v. United States (1983), 463 U.S. 354 (1983), on defendants who were found not guilty by reason of insanity
- Jones v. United States (1999), 526 U.S. 227 (1999), interpreting the federal carjacking statute
- Jones v. United States (2000), 529 U.S. 848 (2000), interpreting an arson provision of the Organized Crime Control Act of 1970.

== See also ==
- United States v. Jones (disambiguation)
- Lists of United States Supreme Court cases
- Lists of United States Supreme Court cases by volume
