= United States v. Johnson =

United States v. Johnson may refer to a variety of cases heard by the United States Supreme Court:

- United States v. Johnson (1863), on a real estate claim
- United States v. Johnson (1879), one of three cases consolidated into the Trade-Mark Cases
- United States v. Johnson (1899), on payment for services performed for the federal government
- United States v. Johnson (1911), on the misbranding provisions of the Pure Food and Drugs Act
- United States v. Johnson (1943), rejecting collusive lawsuits
- United States v. Johnson (1944), on state jurisdiction in the regulation of interstate commerce
- United States v. Johnson (1946), trial court's discretion to review newly discovered evidence
- United States v. Johnson (1966), interpreting Article I, Section 6 of the Constitution, which provides that Senators and Representatives shall not be questioned in any other place for any speech or debate in either House
- United States v. Johnson (1968), interpreting the Public Accommodations provisions of the Civil Rights Act of 1964
- United States v. Johnson (1982), on the retroactivity of Supreme Court decisions
- United States v. Johnson (1987), on the liability of the federal government toward injured military servicemen where injuries arise out of or are in the course of activity incident to service
- United States v. Johnson (2000), defining when a period of supervised release commences

== See also ==
- Johnson v. United States (disambiguation)
