= Williams v. Taylor =

Williams v. Taylor may refer to the following United States Supreme Court cases:

- Williams v. Taylor (Terry Williams), 529 U.S. 362 (2000), a case concerning convicted murderer Terry Williams
- Williams v. Taylor (Michael Williams), 529 U.S. 420 (2000), a case concerning convicted murderer Michael Wayne Williams
