= Johnson v. United States =

Johnson v. United States may refer to the following opinions of the Supreme Court of the United States:

- Johnson v. United States (1895), 157 U.S. 320 (1895), an 1895 opinion
- Johnson v. United States (1896), 160 U.S. 546 (1896), an 1896 opinion
- Johnson v. United States (1948 Fourth Amendment case), 333 U.S. 10 (1948), a 1948 opinion involving the requirement for a search warrant under the Fourth Amendment
- Johnson v. United States (1948 b), 333 U.S. 46 (1948), a 1948 opinion involving the liability of a shipowner for an accident
- Johnson v. United States (2000), 529 U.S. 694 (2000), involving the rights of those serving federal probation and supervised release
- Johnson v. United States (2005), 544 U.S. 295 (2005), an opinion of the 2004 term, involving the statute of limitations under the Antiterrorism and Effective Death Penalty Act of 1996 for prisoners seeking to modify their federal sentence
- Johnson v. United States (2010), 559 U.S. 133 (2010), a decision about the term "violent felony" as it is used in the Armed Career Criminal Act
- Johnson v. United States (2015), 576 U.S. 591 (2015), involving the constitutionality of the residual clause of the Armed Career Criminal Act

== See also ==
- United States v. Johnson (disambiguation)
