= Williamson v. Mazda Motor of America, Inc. =

- Supreme Court of the United States

Argued November 3, 2010 Decided February 23, 2011
- Full case name: Delbert Williamson, et al., Petitioners v. Mazda Motor of America, Inc., et al.
- Docket no.: 08-1314
- Citations: 562 U.S. 323 (more) 131 S. Ct. 1131; 179 L. Ed. 2d 75; 78 U.S.L.W. 3687

Case history
- Prior: dismissed (S.C.O.C 2008), affirmed (C.C.A. 2009), reversed, 562 U.S. 323 (2011).

Holding
- FMVSS 208 does not preempt state tort suits claiming that manufacturers should have installed lap-and-shoulder belts, instead of lap belts, on rear inner seats.

Court membership
- Chief Justice John Roberts Associate Justices Antonin Scalia · Anthony Kennedy; Clarence Thomas · Ruth Bader Ginsburg; Stephen Breyer · Samuel Alito; Sonia Sotomayor · Elena Kagan

Case opinions
- Majority: Breyer, joined by Roberts, Scalia, Kennedy, Ginsburg, Alito, Sotomayor
- Concurrence: Sotomayor
- Concurrence: Thomas (in judgment)
- Kagan took no part in the consideration or decision of the case.

Laws applied
- National Traffic and Motor Vehicle Safety Act

Williamson v. Mazda Motor of America, Inc., 562 U.S. 323 (2011), was a decision by the Supreme Court of the United States, in which the Court unanimously held that Federal Motor Vehicle Safety Standard 208, promulgated by the National Highway Traffic Safety Administration, does not federally preempt state tort lawsuits against auto manufacturers from injuries caused by a defective lack of certain types of seat belts.

The case arose when Thanh Williamson died in a 2002 auto accident from seat-belt related injuries. Williamson's family filed suit against Mazda Motor of America in California state court, claiming a defective design leading to a wrongful death. However, the California trial court dismissed the suit on the pleadings, agreeing with Mazda that the action was preempted by federal law, and the California Court of Appeal affirmed the dismissal. The California Supreme Court declined to review the case, but the U.S. Supreme Court accepted the Williamson's petition for certiorari.

In a unanimous decision handed down on February 23, 2011, the Court unanimously (8-0, with Justice Elena Kagan not taking part in this case) reversed the California courts and held that federal preemption does not apply. Justice Stephen Breyer wrote the decision of the court. Justice Sonia Sotomayor wrote a concurring opinion, and Justice Clarence Thomas wrote an opinion concurring in the judgment.

== Background ==
Dating back as early as 1885, seat belts were first patented by Edward J. Claghorn. In 1955, Ford began offering the lap belt in their automobiles. Saab then began to manufacture their entire range of automobiles with seat belts; most importantly the Saab GT750, launched in 1958. From this model, the practice of seat belt installation then became a competitive advantage to the industry but still did not seem essential to the consumers. Forward, this popular technique became standard in most U.S. automobiles. By 1965, front lap seat belts were produced in several models, by 1968 front shoulder and rear lap belts were introduced, and in 1974 three point front lap belts were adopted in most automobiles. The first United States Federal law pertaining to the use of seat belts became effective January 1, 1968 with the help of the U.S. Department of Transportation which was created two years prior. The law has since been modified but currently requires all vehicles to be produced with three-point seat belts in all seating areas. The use and legality of seat belts varies from state to state, with the first state to pass the law requiring all passengers to wear a seat belt being New York on December 1, 1984. Currently, there are no countries whose automobiles do not offer seat belts and it is a standardized practice worldwide.

During the development of the seat belt, the federal legislation created several agencies responsible for automobile and road safety: The National Traffic Safety Agency, the National Highway Safety Agency, and the National Highway Safety Bureau, which were merged by the 1970 Highway Safety Act into the combined National Highway Traffic Safety Administration (NHTSA).

The NHTSA was authorized to promulgate regulations - the Federal Motor Vehicle Safety Standards (FMVSS) - which provide standards that auto makers must follow in order to allow vehicles to be imported. Of the 68 FMVSS, two standards, 208 and 209, were implemented to standardize lap and shoulder belts in front seating positions as well as lap belts in all other positions in the vehicle.

== Facts of the case ==
On the evening of August 14, 2002, the Williamson family driving in their 1993 Mazda MPV minivan, were struck by a Jeep Wrangler from the opposite direction. The Jeep was being towed by a motor home and came loose, crossing over into the Williamson's lane and causing a head-on collision. Delbert Williamson, the petitioner, was driving, while his wife Thanh and daughter Alexa were seated in the first row of seats behind him. Each passenger was wearing the appropriate seat belt per position. Delbert and Alexa were equipped with Type 2 seat belts which consist of lap and shoulder restraints. Thanh, seated in a middle position, was only equipped with a Type 1 seat belt which consists of just a lap belt. As the vehicles collided, Thanh's body was said to "jackknife" over her lap belt, causing internal bleeding and eventual fatal injuries. Delbert and his daughter Alexa both survived the accident because of the type 2 seat belt they were able to use in their seated position.

== California state court ==
The survivors, Delbert and Alexa, brought the tort suit against Mazda in a California state court claiming that the van had a defective design because it was equipped with lap-only seat belts in the back seats, including where Thanh was sitting. Mazda responded with an argument in regards to the 1989 version of FMVSS 208 which preempted any state law tort claims and that the plaintiffs could not argue their product liability claim in court. The company asserted that FMVSS 208 permits manufacturers to install either Type 1 or Type 2 safety restraints in rear aisle seats. They also claimed that a state law permitting attached liability to manufacturers within this standard conflicts with federal laws. Mazda argued that the suit was barred under federal preemption, a doctrine derived from the Supremacy Clause of the United States Constitution that provides that state law must yield to federal law when the two conflict. On October 22, 2008, the California trial court ruled in favor of Mazda, dismissing the Williamsons' claims.

Williamson appealed the trial court's dismissal of the suit on February 11, 2009, to the California Court of Appeal, but that court affirmed the lower court's decision, relying on Geier v. American Honda Company (2000), in which the U.S. Supreme Court held that the 1984 FMVSS 208 preempted state law claims for car accident injuries due to design. In Williamson's case, the lawsuit also conflicted with Standard 208 and preempted state law claims.

The Williamson petitioned the California Supreme Court to hear the case, but the court declined review.

== Supreme Court ==
Following the California Supreme Court's denial of review, the family petitioned the U.S. Supreme Court for certiorari, which was granted on May 24, 2010.

On February 23, 2011, the Court reversed the decision of the California state court by a unanimous 8-0 vote; the Court ruled that FMVSS 208 does not preempt state law claims, distinguishing from the prior decision made in Geier. The opinion of Justice Elena Kagan was found to be extremely persuasive stating that the lower courts had broadly interpreted federal regulations regarding FMVSS 208, but later had no part in the consideration of the case. The reasoning for this decision was based on the fact that automobile manufacturers had the choice to install airbags in the 1984 version of the law. When it came to developing seatbelt standards in the 1989 version of FMVSS 208, there were concerns about the loss of effectiveness. With this concern, the court was able to conclude that there was no basis to demonstrate the intent of preemption in state law claims by federal auto safety standards. The court distinguished this decision from Geier v. American Honda Motor Co. because, unlike in Geier, the state law did not conflict with the federal statute's purposes, as there was no experiment or gradual implementation component in the seatbelt provision. A legal provision for FMVSS 208 was then enacted in September 2007 requiring vehicles to have lap and shoulder belts for all seats in the rear of the vehicle.

== Problems with preemption ==
Courts have struggled to define a consistent theory on preemption, and opinions differ on to how and to what extent legislative history ought to be used.

== Related cases ==
- Geier v. American Honda Motor Co., 529 U.S. 861 (2000) —'No airbag' lawsuit conflicts with the objectives of FMVSS 208 and is therefore pre-empted by the Act.
- Perry v. Mercedes Benz of North America, Inc., 957 F.2d 1257 (1992) — An alleged manufacturing defect in an automobile airbag is preempted by the National Traffic and Motor Vehicle Safety Act.
- Kolbeck v. General Motors Corp., 702 F.Supp. 532 (1988) — FMVSS 208 preempt a common law damage claim for failing to include a passive occupant restraint system.
- Wood v General Motors Corp. 673 F.Supp. 1108 (1987) — Safety Act and FMVSS 208 impliedly preempt plaintiff's passive restraint claim.
- Baird v General Motors 654 F.Supp. 28 (1986) — Manufacturer has one of three options according to FMVSS 208. Safety Act preempts plaintiff's common law tort action in crash protection case.

== See also ==
- Supremacy Clause of the United States Constitution
- List of United States Supreme Court cases, volume 562
