= United States v. Jones =

United States v. Jones may refer to several Supreme Court cases:

- United States v. Jones, 109 U.S. 513 (1883), a case in which the Court outlined the requirements of the United States government when instituting the right of eminent domain
- United States v. Jones, 119 U.S. 477 (1886)
- United States v. Jones, 121 U.S. 89 (1887)
- United States v. Jones, 131 U.S. 1 (1889)
- United States v. Jones, 134 U.S. 483 (1890)
- United States v. Jones, 147 U.S. 672 (1893)
- United States v. Jones, 149 U.S. 262 (1893)
- United States v. Jones, 193 U.S. 528 (1904)
- United States v. Jones, 236 U.S. 106 (1915)
- United States v. Jones, 336 U.S. 641 (1949)
- United States v. Jones, 345 U.S. 377 (1953)
- United States v. Jones, 565 U.S. 400 (2012), holding that installing a GPS tracking device on a vehicle and using the device to monitor the vehicle's movements constitutes a search under the Fourth Amendment

== See also ==
- Jones v. United States (disambiguation)
- Lists of United States Supreme Court cases
- Lists of United States Supreme Court cases by volume
