= Allgeier =

Allgeier is a surname. Notable people with the surname include:

- Brian Allgeier (born 1971), American video game designer
- Elizabeth Allgeier (1941–2016), American psychologist and sexologist
- Peter Allgeier, American trade representative and lawyer
- Sepp Allgeier (1895–1968), German cinematographer
- Tyler Allgeier (born 2000), American football player
