= Tertium quid =

Metaphorical third element

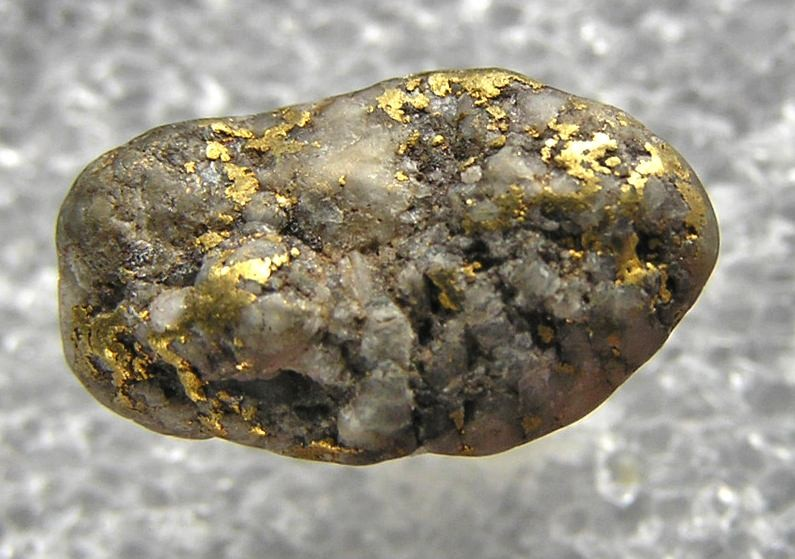
Electrum, a rare alloy of gold and silver, was used by Tertullian as an example of a tertium quid, by which he meant a mixture with composite properties.

Tertium quid refers to an unidentified third element that is in combination with two known ones. The phrase is associated with alchemy. It is Latin for "third something" (literally, "third what"), a translation of the Greek triton ti (τρίτον τί). The Greek phrase was used by Plato (360 BC), and by Irenæus (c. AD 196). The earliest Latin example is by Tertullian (c. 220), who used the phrase to describe a mixed substance with composite properties such as electrum, a somewhat different sense than the modern meaning.

== In Christology ==
In the Christological debates of the fourth century, it was used to refer to the followers of Apollinaris who spoke of Christ as something neither human nor divine, but a mixture of the two in a mysterious and inseparable way, and therefore a "third thing". This term is used in reference to Miaphysite Christology.

== In American political history ==
In American political history, the Tertium Quids, or Quids, were moderate members of Jefferson's Democratic-Republican Party. The word implies that their political position was apt to embrace true republicanism and the comparable conservatism of the Federalist Party, particularly on foreign policy. The Quids arose in 1804 during Thomas Jefferson's first term in office. They were led by Virginia's John Randolph of Roanoke. They stood by the party's original stance for strict construction of the Constitution and opposed Jefferson's pragmatic approach to governing.

== In sociology ==
In sociology, it describes a category of degraded moral consideration.

In Souls of Black Folk, W.E.B. Du Bois used the term "tertium quid" to refer to the identity of African Americans in a racist society, where non-white people are viewed as a devalued category between man and animal.

"The second thought streaming from the death (slave)-ship and the curving river is the thought of the older South, the sincere and passionate belief that somewhere between men and cattle, God created a tertium quid, and called it a Negro—a clownish, simple creature, at times even lovable within its limitations, but straitly foreordained to walk within the Veil."

== In American law ==
The term is used in the Supreme Court of the United States case Wal-Mart Stores, Inc. v. Samara Brothers, Inc. 529 U.S. 205 (2000). In this Lanham Act case, the Court, when discussing product packaging vs. product design, referred to the type of trade dress in its earlier Two Pesos, Inc. v. Taco Cabana, Inc. decision as "some tertium quid" that may be a mutation of product packaging and product design—a "third thing."

== In literature ==
In literature, it can describe an adulterer, often in a cuckolded relationship.

Kipling employs the term in his story "At the Pit’s Mouth" for an adulterer: "Once upon a time there was a Man and his Wife and a Tertium Quid."

Talbot Mundy, a contemporary of Kipling, makes use of the term in King of the Khyber Rifles to describe a cuckold, "And what kind of man must Rewa Gunga be who could lightly let go all the prejudices of the East and submit to what only the West has endured hitherto with any complacency—a "tertium quid"? "

Also, Robert Browning uses the term "Tertium Quid" in his long narrative poem The Ring and the Book for a section presenting third, more balanced viewpoint on the 1698 Roman murder case his poem discusses, different from the opinions expressed in the sections "Half Rome" and "The Other Half Rome", which strongly sympathize with, or equally deplore, the accused.

Tertium Quid is also the title of a book of essays on various topics by Edmund Gurney, published in 1887. He has chosen topics which had opposing points of view but for which he proposes a third way of considering them.

Cormac McCarthy uses the term "tertium quid" in the events synopsis before Chapter VII of Blood Meridian, a reference to the idea that humankind's existence is governed by free will, fate, and a third, unknowable element.
