= United Mine Workers of America v. Bagwell =

- Supreme Court of the United States

Argued November 29, 1993 Decided June 30, 1994
- Full case name: International Union, United Mine Workers Of America, et al., Petitioners v. John L. Bagwell, et al.
- Citations: 512 U.S. 821 (more) 114 S. Ct. 2552; 129 L. Ed. 2d 642; 1994 U.S. LEXIS 5086; 62 U.S.L.W. 4705; 128 Lab. Cas. (CCH) ¶ 11,120; 146 L.R.R.M. 2641; 94 Cal. Daily Op. Service 5027; 94 Daily Journal DAR 9264; 8 Fla. L. Weekly Fed. S 399

Case history
- Prior: Int'l Union, United Mine Workers of Am. v. Clinchfield Coal Co., 12 Va. App. 123, 402 S.E.2d 899 (1991); reversed sub nom. Bagwell v. Int'l Union, United Mine Workers of Am., 244 Va. 463, 423 S.E.2d 349 (1992); 508 U.S. 949 (1993).

Holding
- A fine for contempt that could not be purged by compliance with the order of the court was a criminal contempt, and it could not be assessed without a jury trial.

Court membership
- Chief Justice William Rehnquist Associate Justices Harry Blackmun · John P. Stevens; Sandra Day O'Connor · Antonin Scalia; Anthony Kennedy · David Souter; Clarence Thomas · Ruth Bader Ginsburg

Case opinions
- Majority: Blackmun, joined by unanimous (parts I, II-A, II-C, III); Stevens, O'Connor, Scalia, Kennedy, Souter, Thomas (part II-B)
- Concurrence: Scalia
- Concurrence: Ginsburg, joined by Rehnquist

Laws applied
- U.S. Const. amend. XIV

United Mine Workers of America v. Bagwell, 512 U.S. 821 (1994), was a case in which the United States Supreme Court held that a fine for contempt that could not be purged by compliance with the order of the court was a criminal contempt, and it could not be assessed without a jury trial.

== Facts ==
A trial court enjoined striking unions in Virginia from undertaking certain unlawful activities (throwing things, threatening, obstructing, and picketing without supervision); when union members repeatedly violated the injunction, the trial court established a schedule of $100,000 fine for future violent breaches, $20,000 fine for future non-violent breaches; after more violations of the injunction, the trial court ended up assessing $64 million, including $12 million to the plaintiff in the civil case and $52 million to the county and the commonwealth of Virginia. The parties settled, but the trial court refused to vacate the fines to be paid to the county and commonwealth. The Virginia appellate court reversed the trial court, but the Virginia Supreme Court reversed the appellate court. Appeal was then taken to the U.S. Supreme Court.

== Issue ==
Were these fines civil, or were they criminal (in which case due process and jury would be required)?

== Opinion of the Court ==
The Court, in an opinion by Justice Blackmun, held that a contempt sanction is civil if it is remedial and for the benefit of the complainant—if it either coerces the defendant into compliance with the court’s order or compensates the complainant for losses sustained. But where a fine is not compensatory, it is civil only if the contemnor is afforded an opportunity to "purge" (avoid or reduce fine through compliance); otherwise, it is criminal contempt.

Therefore, there could be no compensation to the plaintiff as there was no opportunity for the defendant to purge the contempt. Therefore, these were criminal fines, which required appropriate due process—a trial by jury—which had not been afforded.

Justice Scalia wrote a concurring opinion, expressing concern about the judge also acting as rulemaker and enforcer. Justice Ginsburg also wrote a concurring opinion, joined by Chief Justice Rehnquist, further elucidating the distinction between civil and criminal fines.

== See also ==
- List of United States Supreme Court cases, volume 512
- List of United States Supreme Court cases
- Lists of United States Supreme Court cases by volume
- List of United States Supreme Court cases by the Rehnquist Court
