= Supreme Court cases of the American Civil War =

A number of cases were tried before the Supreme Court of the United States during the period of the American Civil War. These cases focused on wartime civil liberties, and the ability of the various branches of the government to alter them. The following cases were among the most significant.

== Pre-war ==
- Ex parte Bollman (1807) was an early case that made many important arguments about the power of the Supreme Court, as well as the constitutional definition of treason.
- Dred Scott v. Sandford (1857) Dred Scott, a slave owned by a Dr. Emerson, was taken from Missouri to a free state and then back to Missouri again. Scott sued, claiming that his residence in a free territory granted him freedom. In a 7–2 vote, the Supreme Court decided that Congress did not have the power to prohibit slavery in the territories, making the already repealed Missouri Compromise of 1820 unconstitutional. Furthermore, the Court went on to state that blacks were not citizens of the United States and could not become citizens and therefore they could not sue in a court.

== During the war ==
- Ex parte Merryman (1861) was actually not a Supreme Court case, although it was heard by then-Chief Justice Roger Taney (see circuit riding). Taney protested Lincoln's secret notice granting military personnel the power to suspend the writ of habeas corpus. This case is an example of a U.S. President ignoring a court's ruling on the grounds of necessity.
- In Ex parte Vallandigham (1863), a former congressman was tried before a military tribunal by General Ambrose Burnside for treason after he delivered an incendiary speech at Mount Vernon. A writ of certiorari brought the case to the Supreme Court under Chief Justice Roger Taney. The court avoided disagreement with the President or military by arguing that since the extra-legal tribunals were, unsurprisingly, not listed in any documents enumerating courts over which the Supreme Court had authority, Vallandigham had no grounds for appeal. Ex parte Metzger was used as precedent.

== Post-war ==
- In Ex parte Milligan (1866), the Supreme Court led by Chase ruled that, so long as local civilian courts are open, citizens may not be tried by military tribunals. It further observed that, during the suspension of the writ of habeas corpus, citizens may only be held without charges, not tried, and certainly may not be executed by military tribunals.
- In Texas v. White (1869), the Court held in a 5–3 decision that Texas had remained a state of the United States ever since it first joined the Union, despite its joining the Confederate States of America and its being under military rule at the time of the decision in the case. It further held that the Constitution did not permit states to secede from the United States, and that the ordinances of secession, and all the acts of the legislatures within seceding states intended to give effect to such ordinances, were "absolutely null." However, this decision did allow some possibility of divisibility "through revolution, or through consent of the States."
