= Signal bleed =

Signal bleed is a phenomenon that occurs, usually on cable television, when a signal is not blocked as intended. Issues related to signal bleed came into public awareness as channels with adult material became available on cable television services and, occasionally, viewers (including minors) were able to view faint or partial images of adult material on channels that were supposed to be completely blocked. In one case of signal bleed, the audio on the blocked channel was heard even as the image was scrambled.

Signal bleed was discussed in the 2000 U.S. Supreme Court case United States v. Playboy Entertainment Group.
