= List of United States Supreme Court cases, volume 512 =

This is a list of all the United States Supreme Court cases from volume 512 of the United States Reports:

Case name	Citation	Date decided
Romano v. Oklahoma	512 U.S. 1	1994
United States v. Carlton	512 U.S. 26	1994
City of Ladue v. Gilleo	512 U.S. 43	1994
Department of Taxation and Finance of N. Y. v. Milhelm Attea & Bros.	512 U.S. 61	1994
O'Melveny & Myers v. FDIC	512 U.S. 79	1994
Howlett v. Birkdale Shipping Co.	512 U.S. 92	1994
Livadas v. Bradshaw	512 U.S. 107	1994
Ibanez v. Florida Dept. of Business and Professional Regulation, Bd. of Accountancy	512 U.S. 136	1994
Simmons v. South Carolina	512 U.S. 154	1994
West Lynn Creamery, Inc. v. Healy	512 U.S. 186	1994
MCI Telecommunications Corp. v. American Telephone & Telegraph Co.	512 U.S. 218	1994
Hawaiian Airlines, Inc. v. Norris	512 U.S. 246	1994
Director, Office of Workers' Compensation Programs v. Greenwich Collieries	512 U.S. 267	1994
APA Section 7(c)'s burden of proof provision applies to adjudications under the LHWCA and the BLBA, each of which contains a section incorporating the APA.
Barclays Bank PLC v. Franchise Tax Bd. of Cal.	512 U.S. 298	1994
Reed v. Farley	512 U.S. 339	1994
Dolan v. City of Tigard	512 U.S. 374	1994
Honda Motor Co. v. Oberg	512 U.S. 415	1994
Davis v. United States	512 U.S. 452	1994
Heck v. Humphrey	512 U.S. 477	1994
Thomas Jefferson Univ. v. Shalala	512 U.S. 504	1994
Consolidated Rail Corporation v. Gottshall	512 U.S. 532	1994
Shannon v. United States	512 U.S. 573	1994
Williamson v. United States	512 U.S. 594	1994
Turner Broadcasting System, Inc. v. FCC	512 U.S. 622	1994
Board of Ed. of Kiryas Joel Village School Dist. v. Grumet	512 U.S. 687	1994
Madsen v. Women's Health Center, Inc.	512 U.S. 753	1994
Mine Workers v. Bagwell	512 U.S. 821	1994
McFarland v. Scott	512 U.S. 849	1994
A capital defendant need not file a formal habeas corpus petition in order to invoke his right to counsel under § 848(q)(4)(B) and to establish a federal court's jurisdiction to enter a stay of execution.
Holder v. Hall	512 U.S. 874	1994
Tuilaepa v. California	512 U.S. 967	1994
Johnson v. De Grandy	512 U.S. 997	1994
