= Ex parte Vallandigham =

- Supreme Court of the United States

Argued January 22, 1864 Decided February 15, 1864
- Full case name: Ex parte Clement Vallandigham
- Citations: 68 U.S. 243 (more) 1 Wall. 243; 17 L. Ed. 589; 1863 U.S. LEXIS 456

Case history
- Prior: This case arose on the petition of Clement L. Vallandigham for a certiorari, to be directed to the Judge Advocate General of the Army of the United States, to send up to the Court, for its review, the proceedings of a military commission, by which Vallandigham had been tried and sentenced to imprisonment.

Holding
- The Supreme Court of the United States has no power to review by certiorari the proceedings of a military commission ordered by a general officer of the United States Army, commanding a military department.

Court membership
- Chief Justice Roger B. Taney Associate Justices James M. Wayne · John Catron; Samuel Nelson · Robert C. Grier; Nathan Clifford · Noah H. Swayne; Samuel F. Miller · David Davis; Stephen J. Field

Case opinions
- Majority: Wayne, joined by Taney, Catron, Clifford, Swayne, Davis
- Concurrence: Nelson joined by Grier, Field
- Miller took no part in the consideration or decision of the case.

Laws applied
- U.S. Const., Judiciary Act of 1789

Ex parte Vallandigham, 68 U.S. (1 Wall.) 243 (1864), is a United States Supreme Court case, involving a former congressman Clement Vallandigham of Ohio, who had violated an Army order against the public expression of sympathy for the Confederate States and their cause. Vallandigham was tried before a military tribunal by Major General Ambrose E. Burnside for treason after he delivered an incendiary speech at Mount Vernon; he then appealed the tribunal's verdict to the Supreme Court, arguing that he as a civilian could not be tried before a military tribunal.

In February 1864, the Supreme Court avoided ruling on the question by instead unanimously holding that they could not take appeals from military tribunals at all.

== Background ==
Clement Vallandigham, a member of the United States House of Representatives, was the acknowledged leader of the pro-Confederate faction known as Copperheads in Ohio. After General Burnside, commander of the Military District of Ohio, issued General Order Number 38, warning that the "habit of declaring sympathies for the enemy" would not be tolerated, Vallandigham gave a major speech (May 1, 1863) charging the war was being fought not to save the Union but to free blacks and enslave whites. To those who supported the war he declared, "Defeat, debt, taxation [and] sepulchres – these are your trophies." He also called for "King Lincoln's" removal from the presidency.

Accordingly, on May 5, Vallandingham was arrested as a violator of General Order No. 38. Vallandigham's enraged supporters burned the offices of the Dayton Journal, the local Republican newspaper. He was tried by a military court on 6–7 May (the court adjourning to let him obtain a lawyer), convicted of "uttering disloyal sentiments" and attempting to hinder the prosecution of the war, and sentenced to two years' confinement in a military prison. A Federal circuit judge upheld Vallandigham's arrest and military trial as a valid exercise of the President's war powers.

Despite repeated petitions, President Lincoln refused to repudiate Burnside's actions or release Vallandigham. In a letter written in response to one meeting of Albany Democrats, Lincoln explained his position:

Must I shoot a simple-minded soldier boy who deserts, while I must not touch a hair of a wiley agitator who induces him to desert? This is none the less injurious when effected by getting a father, or brother, or friend into a public meeting, and there working upon his feelings till he is persuaded to write the soldier boy that he is fighting in a bad cause ...

However, in late May, Lincoln commuted Vallandigham's sentence to banishment to the Confederacy, from where (in July) he went to Canada.

== Ruling ==
Meanwhile, Vallandigham's lawyers appealed the military tribunal's decision to the Supreme Court. The Court issued a unanimous ruling in February 1864, refusing to address Vallandigham's main argument that the military tribunal lacked jurisdiction to try him. Instead, they said the Court was only authorized to take appeals as regulated by Congress – and Congress had never authorized them to take an appeal from a military tribunal. Accordingly, they denied Vallandigham's appeal for lack of jurisdiction.

After the war was over, the Court would again revisit this issue in Ex parte Milligan, a similar case where, instead of appealing his sentence by a military tribunal, Milligan filed a writ of habeas corpus. Then, the court upheld Milligan and Vallandigham's claim that military tribunals lacked authority to try civilians when civil courts were open.

== See also ==
- Supreme Court cases of the American Civil War
- Ex parte Milligan
