= West Lynn Creamery, Inc. v. Healy =

- Supreme Court of the United States

Argued March 2, 1994 Decided June 17, 1994
- Full case name: West Lynn Creamery, Inc., et al. v. Jonathan Healy, Commissioner of the Massachusetts Department of Food and Agriculture
- Citations: 512 U.S. 186 (more) 114 S. Ct. 2205; 129 L. Ed. 2d 157; 62 U.S.L.W. 4518; 73 A.F.T.R.2d (RIA) 1048; 94 Cal. Daily Op. Service 4525; 94 Daily Journal DAR 8413; 8 Fla. L. Weekly Fed. S 300

Case history
- Prior: 415 Mass. 8

Court membership
- Chief Justice William Rehnquist Associate Justices Harry Blackmun · John P. Stevens; Sandra Day O'Connor · Antonin Scalia; Anthony Kennedy · David Souter; Clarence Thomas · Ruth Bader Ginsburg

Case opinions
- Majority: Stevens, joined by O'Connor, Kennedy, Souter, Ginsburg
- Concurrence: Scalia (in judgment only), joined by Thomas
- Dissent: Rehnquist, joined by Blackmun

Laws applied
- U.S. Const. art. I § 8 cl. 3 (Commerce Clause), Dormant Commerce Clause

West Lynn Creamery, Inc. v. Healy, 512 U.S. 186 (1994), was a United States Supreme Court case relating to the extent that states can set prices for goods under the Commerce Clause of the United States Constitution.

== Background ==
=== Facts ===
After milk prices plummeted, the Massachusetts Department of Food and Agriculture issued a pricing order that taxed all the raw milk sold by milk dealers to Massachusetts retailers and dispersed the revenue as a subsidy to Massachusetts dairy farmers. The order, which was designed to aid only Massachusetts milk producers, required dealers to pay into a fund monthly payments that were determined by subtracting from $15 the monthly federal blend price for 100 pounds of raw milk. Although approximately two-thirds of such milk was produced outside Massachusetts, the entire fund was distributed monthly to Massachusetts dairy farmers according to each farmer's proportionate contribution to the state's total production of raw milk.

Two licensed Massachusetts milk dealers, who purchased raw milk outside of Massachusetts but did business in Massachusetts, refused to make the payments required under the pricing order, and Massachusetts commenced license revocation proceedings against the dealers.

The dealers then sought an injunction against enforcement of the order on the ground that the order violated the Federal Constitution's Commerce Clause (Art I, 8, cl 3).

=== Procedural history ===
The Superior Court of Suffolk County, Massachusetts, denied relief, and a Massachusetts official conditionally revoked the dealers' licenses.

The Supreme Judicial Court of Massachusetts, expressing the view that the local benefits provided to the Massachusetts dairy industry by the pricing order outweighed any incidental burden on interstate commerce, affirmed the Superior Court judgment.

== Opinion of the Court ==
On certiorari, the United States Supreme Court reversed. Justice Stevens wrote for the majority, joined by Justices O'Connor, Kennedy, Souter, and Ginsburg.

He determined that the pricing order violated the commerce clause, where (1) the avowed purpose and undisputed effect of the order were to enable higher-cost Massachusetts dairy farmers to compete with lower-cost dairy farmers in other states; (2) the tax was effectively imposed on only out-of-state products; (3) the order would almost certainly cause local goods to constitute a larger share, and goods with an out-of-state source to constitute a smaller share, of the total sales in the market; (4) by distributing monies directly to Massachusetts dairy farmers, the order insured that Massachusetts producers would benefit; (5) the order was unconstitutional even if (a) the tax on milk sales and the subsidy to Massachusetts dairy farmers would each be constitutional standing alone, (b) the dealers who paid the tax were not competitors of the farmers who received disbursements from the fund, and (c) the costs of the program imposed under the order were borne by only Massachusetts dealers and consumers; and (6) the order's burden on commerce could not be justified by the local benefit preserving the Massachusetts dairy industry.

Negative Commerce Clause jurisprudence had long forbidden state tariffs because they discriminated against interstate commerce by burdening out-of-state competitors to the benefit of in-state businesses. The Court explained that a state could not use its legitimate powers to tax and to subsidize state businesses to effect the illegitimate aim of imposing what was in effect a tariff. The Court held that a nondiscriminatory tax had been coupled with a legitimate subsidy to create an effect that nonetheless violated the Commerce Clause.

Thus, the Court reversed the state supreme court's order, which had upheld a pricing order by the Massachusetts Department of Food and Agriculture to tax milk produced out-of-state and to distribute the proceeds to in-state dairy farmers. The Court held that the order violated the negative Commerce Clause because, like a tariff, it benefitted in-state economic interests by burdening out-of-state competitors, such as the milk buyers.

=== Concurrence ===
Justice Scalia, concurred, joined by Justice Thomas.

He argued that (1) a self-executing negative commerce clause should be enforced against a state law that (a) facially discriminates against interstate commerce, or (b) is indistinguishable from a type of law previously held unconstitutional by the Supreme Court; and (2) applying this approach, or at least the second part of it, the pricing order was invalid.

=== Dissent ===
Chief Justice Rehnquist dissented, joined by Justice Blackmun.

He stated that no decided case supported the court's conclusion that the negative commerce clause prohibits a state from using money that it has lawfully obtained through a neutral tax on milk dealers and distributing the money as a subsidy to dairy farmers.

== See also ==
- Agricultural Marketing Agreement Act of 1937, 7 U.S.C.S. § 601 et seq.
