= Bond v. United States (2000) =

- Supreme Court of the United States

Argued February, 2000 Decided April 17, 2000
- Full case name: Steven Dewayne Bond v. United States of America
- Citations: 529 U.S. 334 (more) 120 S. Ct. 1462; 146 L. Ed. 2d 365
- Argument: Oral argument

Case history
- Prior: United States v. Bond, 167 F.3d 225 (5th Cir. 1999); cert. granted, 528 U.S. 927 (1999).
- Subsequent: Remanded, 213 F.3d 840 (5th Cir. 2000).

Holding
- The agent's physical manipulation of petitioner's carry-on bag violated the Fourth Amendment's proscription against unreasonable searches.

Court membership
- Chief Justice William Rehnquist Associate Justices John P. Stevens · Sandra Day O'Connor; Antonin Scalia · Anthony Kennedy; David Souter · Clarence Thomas; Ruth Bader Ginsburg · Stephen Breyer

Case opinions
- Majority: Rehnquist, joined by Stevens, O'Connor, Kennedy, Souter, Thomas, Ginsburg
- Dissent: Breyer, joined by Scalia

Bond v United States, 529 U.S. 334 (2000), was a United States Supreme Court case regarding the Fourth Amendment to the U.S. Constitution that applied the 1993 ruling of Minnesota v. Dickerson, which held that police may not physically manipulate items without a warrant without violating the Fourth Amendment, to luggage. The Court ruled that luggage satisfied the two-prong test established by the landmark 1967 case Katz v. United States that (1) the defendant had a subjective expectation of privacy in the area in question and (2) the expectation was one that society was prepared to accept as reasonable. The Court ruled that since the defendant had tried to preserve his privacy by using an opaque bag and it was reasonable for him to believe that his bag would not be felt in an "exploratory manner", the Katz prongs were satisfied.

== Background ==
During an immigration status check of a passenger on a bus in Texas, a United States Border Patrol agent squeezed Bond's soft luggage, believing that the bag held a "brick-like" object. After Bond admitted that it was his bag and then consented to a search of the bag, the agent found a brick of methamphetamine. He was arrested and indicted on federal drug charges, and moved to suppress the brick on the basis that the agent had conducted an illegal search of the bag when squeezing it. He claimed that the squeezing was a violation of the Fourth Amendment prohibition on unreasonable searches and seizures. The district court denied the motion and found him guilty. The Fifth Circuit Court of Appeals held that the agent's manipulation of the bag was not a search under the Fourth Amendment.

== Opinion ==
Chief Justice William Rehnquist wrote a majority opinion joined by Justices John Paul Stevens, Sandra Day O'Connor, Anthony Kennedy, David Souter, Clarence Thomas, and Ruth Bader Ginsburg. Rehnquist held that the agent's physical manipulation of Bond's bag violated the Fourth Amendment."

Justice Stephen Breyer dissented, joined by Justice Antonin Scalia.
