= Cook County v. United States ex rel. Chandler =

- Supreme Court of the United States

Decided March 10, 2003
- Full case name: Cook County v. United States ex rel. Chandler
- Citations: 538 U.S. 119 (more)

Holding
- Local governments are "persons" who may be sued via qui tam actions under the False Claims Act.

Court membership
- Chief Justice William Rehnquist Associate Justices John P. Stevens · Sandra Day O'Connor; Antonin Scalia · Anthony Kennedy; David Souter · Clarence Thomas; Ruth Bader Ginsburg · Stephen Breyer

Case opinion
- Majority: Souter, joined by unanimous

Laws applied
- False Claims Act

Cook County v. United States ex rel. Chandler, 538 U.S. 119 (2003), was a United States Supreme Court case in which the court held that local governments are "persons" who may be sued via qui tam actions under the False Claims Act.

== Background ==
Under the False Claims Act (FCA), "[a]ny person" who, among other things, "knowingly presents, or causes to be presented, to an officer or employee of the United States Government ... a false or fraudulent claim for payment or approval" is liable to the government for a civil penalty, treble damages, and costs. Although the United States Attorney General may sue under the FCA, a private person, known as a relator, may also bring a qui tam action "in the name of the Government." The relator must inform the United States Department of Justice of their intentions and keep the pleadings under seal while the government decides whether to intervene and do its own litigating. If the claim succeeds, the relator's share may be up to 30 percent of the proceeds of the action, plus reasonable expenses, costs, and attorney's fees.

This case involved a National Institute of Drug Abuse research grant to Cook County Hospital in Illinois for a study that was later administered by a nonprofit research institute affiliated with the hospital. Chandler, who ran the study for the institute, filed a qui tam action, claiming that Cook County and the institute had submitted false statements to obtain grant funds in violation of the False Claims Act. After the United States Supreme Court held in Vermont Agency of Natural Resources v. United States ex rel. Stevens that states are not "persons" subject to FCA qui tam actions, the federal District Court granted the county's motion to dismiss the claims against it. The court held that the county, like a state, could not be subjected to treble damages, which Stevens described as "essentially punitive". The Seventh Circuit Court of Appeals distinguished Stevens and reversed.

The Supreme Court granted certiorari.

== Opinion of the court ==
The Supreme Court issued an opinion on March 10, 2003.
