= Honda Motor Co. v. Oberg =

Honda Motor Company v. Oberg
- Supreme Court of the United States

Argued April 20, 1994 Decided June 24, 1994
- Full case name: Honda Motor Company, Ltd., et al., Petitioners v. Karl L. Oberg
- Citations: 512 U.S. 415 (more) 114 S. Ct. 2331; 129 L. Ed. 2d 336; 1994 U.S. LEXIS 4825; 62 U.S.L.W. 4627; CCH Prod. Liab. Rep. ¶ 13,895; 94 Cal. Daily Op. Service 4761; 94 Daily Journal DAR 8844; 8 Fla. L. Weekly Fed. S 341

Holding
- Oregon's 1910 state constitutional amendment prohibiting a judicial review of jury awards violates the Due Process Clause of the Fourteenth Amendment.

Court membership
- Chief Justice William Rehnquist Associate Justices Harry Blackmun · John P. Stevens; Sandra Day O'Connor · Antonin Scalia; Anthony Kennedy · David Souter; Clarence Thomas · Ruth Bader Ginsburg

Case opinions
- Majority: Stevens, joined by Blackmun, O'Connor, Scalia, Kennedy, Souter, Thomas
- Concurrence: Scalia
- Dissent: Ginsburg, joined by Rehnquist

Laws applied
- U.S. Const. amend. XIV

Honda Motor Company v. Oberg, 512 U.S. 415 (1994), was a United States Supreme Court case in which the Court held that an amendment to the Oregon state constitution disallowing judicial review of the size of punitive damages was a violation of due process.

== Decision ==
In a products liability action, Honda was found liable for injuries received by the plaintiff in an ATV accident. Honda was liable for a $5 million punitive damage award, and both the state appellate court and the Oregon Supreme Court declined to review the award for excessiveness based on an amendment to the Oregon constitution. The Supreme Court of United States held that the amendment to the Oregon constitution violated due process. The Court held that judicial review of punitive damage awards for excessiveness was a long-standing common law tradition that was critical in protecting against arbitrary deprivations of property, and that Oregon had not instituted a substitute procedure to maintain these protections.

== See also ==
- Geier v. American Honda Motor Company
- List of United States Supreme Court cases, volume 512
