= Certificate of appealability =

Document that allows an appeal of a denial of a writ

In the most common types of habeas corpus proceedings in the United States federal courts, a certificate of appealability is a legal document that must be issued before a petitioner may appeal from a denial of the writ. The certificate may only be issued when the petitioner has made a "substantial showing of the denial of a constitutional right".

The application may be made explicitly, but a notice of appeal made without a certificate of appealability is treated as an implicit application for the certificate. "To obtain a [certificate of appealability], the [petitioner] must make a request to a district or circuit court judge. In the application, the [petitioner] includes the issues he wishes to raise on appeal. In general, the application process is informal, there is no hearing, and the government rarely files a brief in response to the prisoner's request. The determination is simply made in chambers. If the district court judge denies the request, the [petitioner] may apply to the circuit judge. In addition, a notice of appeal to the circuit court can be treated as a request for a COA."

Under Rule 22 of the Federal Rules of Appellate Procedure, "a certificate of appealability is not required when a state or its representative or the United States or its representative appeals." A certificate of appealability is also not required for petitioners seeking a writ of coram nobis; however, the writ of coram nobis is only available for those who are no longer in-custody (or on probation) and the issues raised in the petition could not have been known while the petitioner was in-custody.

The Antiterrorism and Effective Death Penalty Act of 1996 changed the procedures for issuing a certificate of appealability in federal court. Under the 1996 law, there can be no appeal from a final order in a §2255 proceeding unless a circuit justice or judge issues a certificate of appealability.

The United States Supreme Court held in Slack v. McDaniel, 529 U.S. 473 (2000), that the standard for issuing a certificate is whether "reasonable jurists could debate whether (or, for that matter, agree that) the petition should have been resolved in a different manner".
