= City of Erie v. Pap's A. M. =

Erie v. Pap's A. M.
- Supreme Court of the United States

Argued November 10, 1999 Decided March 29, 2000
- Full case name: City of Erie, et al. v. Pap's A. M., tdba "Kandyland"
- Citations: 529 U.S. 277 (more) 120 S. Ct. 1382; 146 L. Ed. 2d 265

Case history
- Prior: 553 Pa. 348, 719 A.2d 273. The state supreme court determined that petitioner City's ordinance banning public nudity violated respondent operator of totally nude dancing establishment's right to freedom of expression under U.S. Const. amend. I.

Holding
- The ordinance was content-neutral because it regulated conduct alone, did not target nudity that contained an erotic message, and petitioner's interest in preventing harmful secondary effects associated with adult entertainment establishments was not related to the suppression of the exotic message conveyed by nude dancing. The O'Brien test for evaluating restrictions on symbolic speech therefore applied, and was successfully met. Reversed.

Court membership
- Chief Justice William Rehnquist Associate Justices John P. Stevens · Sandra Day O'Connor; Antonin Scalia · Anthony Kennedy; David Souter · Clarence Thomas; Ruth Bader Ginsburg · Stephen Breyer

Case opinions
- Majority: O'Connor (Parts I and II), joined by Rehnquist, Kennedy, Souter, Breyer
- Plurality: O'Connor (Parts III and IV), joined by Rehnquist, Kennedy, Breyer
- Concurrence: Scalia, joined by Thomas
- Concur/dissent: Souter
- Dissent: Stevens, joined by Ginsburg

Laws applied
- U.S. Const. Amend. I

Erie v. Pap's A. M., 529 U.S. 277 (2000), is a landmark decision by the Supreme Court of the United States regarding nude dancing as free speech. The court held that an ordinance banning public nudity did not violate the free speech rights of a nude entertainment establishment's operator, employees, or customers.

== Prior history ==
On September 28, 1994, the city council of Erie, Pennsylvania, enacted Ordinance 75–1994, a public indecency ordinance that makes it a summary offense to knowingly or intentionally appear in public in a "state of nudity." The respondent, Pap's, a Pennsylvania corporation, operated an establishment in Erie known as Kandyland that featured totally nude erotic dancing performed by women. To comply with the ordinance, these dancers would need to wear, at a minimum, pasties and a G-string. On October 14, 1994, two days after the ordinance went into effect, Pap's filed a complaint against the city of Erie, mayor Joyce Savacchio, city solicitor Gregory A. Karle, and members of the city council, seeking declaratory relief and a permanent injunction against the enforcement of the ordinance.

The state Court of Common Pleas struck down the ordinance as unconstitutional, but the state appellate Commonwealth Court reversed the decision. The Pennsylvania Supreme Court in turn reversed the Commonwealth Court, finding that the ordinance's public nudity section was an unconstitutional violation of Pap's First Amendment rights. The company appealed to the U.S. Supreme Court and was granted certiorari.

== Opinion of the Court ==
=== Mootness ===
The U.S. Supreme Court proceeded to the merits of the case despite a possible mootness issue. While the case was pending, Pap's A.M. went out of business, meaning that no concrete private rights were left to litigate. Despite going out of business, the Supreme Court still heard the case because 1) the City of Erie was suffering an "ongoing injury" and 2) Pap's was still incorporated and could potentially go back into business.

=== First Amendment arguments ===
The court found the following rules of law to apply:

- Being in a state of nudity is not an inherently expressive condition. Totally nude erotic dancing is expressive conduct, although it falls only within the outer ambit of the protection of the First Amendment.
- Governmental restrictions on all public nudity should be evaluated under the framework set forth in United States v. O'Brien for content-neutral restrictions on symbolic speech.
- A city may pass a restriction on public nudity and erotic dancing with an argument about the possible secondary effects on the surrounding community, even though such a ban may place incidental burdens on some protected speech.
- For purposes of analysis under the First Amendment, even if a regulation has an incidental effect on some speakers or messages but not others, the regulation is content-neutral if it can be justified without reference to the content of the expression.

After determining that the ordinance was content neutral, the Court then applied the O'Brien test for evaluating restrictions on symbolic speech. The first factor of the O'Brien test is whether the government regulation is within the constitutional power of the government to enact. The second factor is whether the regulation furthers an important or substantial government interest. The third factor is that the government interest must be unrelated to the suppression of free expression. The fourth factor is that the restriction be no greater than is essential to the furtherance of the government interest.

The court found that the ordinance met all four factors of the O'Brien test, and that a "least restrictive means" analysis was not necessary. The Court reversed the decision of the Pennsylvania Supreme Court, and found the ordinance to be constitutional.

== Concurrence ==
Justice Scalia, joined by Justice Thomas, agreed that the Pennsylvania Supreme Court's decision must be reversed, but disagreed with the mode of analysis that should be applied.

== See also ==
- List of United States Supreme Court cases, volume 529
- List of United States Supreme Court cases
- Lists of United States Supreme Court cases by volume
- United States v. O'Brien
