= List of United States Supreme Court cases, volume 68 =

Supreme Court of the United States
- Interactive map of Supreme Court of the United States
- 38°53′26″N 77°00′16″W
- Established: March 4, 1789; 236 years ago
- Location: Washington, D.C.
- Coordinates: 38°53′26″N 77°00′16″W
- Composition method: Presidential nomination with Senate confirmation
- Authorised by: Constitution of the United States, Art. III, § 1
- Judge term length: life tenure, subject to impeachment and removal
- Number of positions: 10 (by statute)
- Website: supremecourt.gov

This is a list of cases reported in volume 68 (1 Wall.) of United States Reports, decided by the Supreme Court of the United States in 1863 and 1864.

== Nominative reports ==
In 1874, the U.S. government created the United States Reports, and retroactively numbered older privately published case reports as part of the new series. As a result, cases appearing in volumes 1–90 of U.S. Reports have dual citation forms; one for the volume number of U.S. Reports, and one for the volume number of the reports named for the relevant reporter of decisions (these are called "nominative reports").

=== John William Wallace ===
Starting with the 66th volume of U.S. Reports, the Reporter of Decisions of the Supreme Court of the United States was John William Wallace. Wallace was Reporter of Decisions from 1863 to 1874, covering volumes 68 through 90 of United States Reports which correspond to volumes 1 through 23 of his Wallace's Reports. As such, the dual form of citation to, for example, Gregg v. Von Phul is 68 U.S. (1 Wall.) 274 (1864).

Wallace's Reports were the final nominative reports for the US Supreme Court; starting with volume 91, cases were identified simply as "(volume #) U.S. (page #) (year)".

== Justices of the Supreme Court at the time of 68 U.S. (1 Wall.) ==
The Supreme Court is established by Article III, Section 1 of the Constitution of the United States, which says: "The judicial Power of the United States, shall be vested in one supreme Court . . .". The size of the Court is not specified; the Constitution leaves it to Congress to set the number of justices. Under the Judiciary Act of 1789 Congress originally fixed the number of justices at six (one chief justice and five associate justices). Since 1789 Congress has varied the size of the Court from six to seven, nine, ten, and back to nine justices (always including one chief justice).

When the cases in 68 U.S. (1 Wall.) were decided the Court comprised these ten members (this was due to the Tenth Circuit Act of 1863, expanding the Court's membership from nine to ten justices, to date the largest number of active justices in its history):

Portrait	Justice	Office	Home State	Succeeded	Date confirmed by the Senate (Vote)	Tenure on Supreme Court
	Roger B. Taney	Chief Justice	Maryland	John Marshall	March 15, 1836 (29–15)	March 28, 1836 – October 12, 1864 (Died)
	James Moore Wayne	Associate Justice	Georgia	William Johnson	January 9, 1835 (Acclamation)	January 14, 1835 – July 5, 1867 (Died)
	John Catron	Associate Justice	Tennessee	newly created seat	March 8, 1837 (28–15)	May 1, 1837 – May 30, 1865 (Died)
	Samuel Nelson	Associate Justice	New York	Smith Thompson	February 14, 1845 (Acclamation)	February 27, 1845 – November 28, 1872 (Retired)
	Robert Cooper Grier	Associate Justice	Pennsylvania	Henry Baldwin	August 4, 1846 (Acclamation)	August 10, 1846 – January 31, 1870 (Retired)
	Nathan Clifford	Associate Justice	Maine	Benjamin Robbins Curtis	January 12, 1858 (26–23)	January 21, 1858 – July 25, 1881 (Died)
	Noah Haynes Swayne	Associate Justice	Ohio	John McLean	January 24, 1862 (38–1)	January 27, 1862 – January 24, 1881 (Retired)
	Samuel Freeman Miller	Associate Justice	Iowa	Peter Vivian Daniel	July 16, 1862 (Acclamation)	July 21, 1862 – October 13, 1890 (Died)
	David Davis	Associate Justice	Illinois	John Archibald Campbell	December 8, 1862 (Acclamation)	December 10, 1862 – March 4, 1877 (Resigned)
	Stephen Johnson Field	Associate Justice	California	newly created seat	March 10, 1863 (Acclamation)	May 10, 1863 – December 1, 1897 (Retired)

== Notable Case in 68 U.S. (1 Wall.) ==
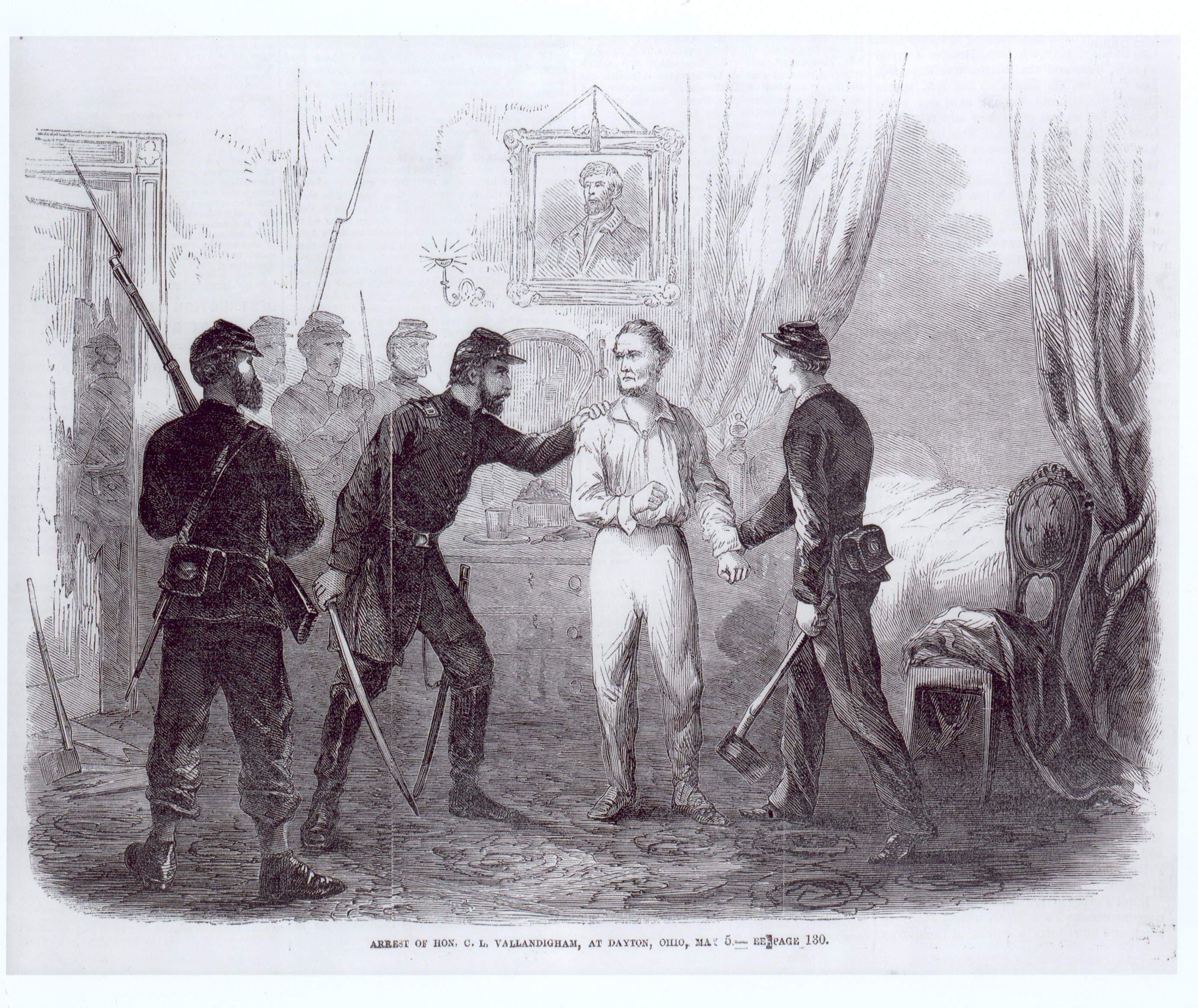
Vallandigham's arrest, 1863

=== Ex parte Vallandigham ===
Ex parte Vallandigham, 68 U.S. (1 Wall.) 243 (1864) is a case involving a former congressman, Clement Vallandigham of Ohio, who had violated an Army order against the public expression of sympathy for the Confederate States and their cause. Vallandigham was tried before a military tribunal for treason after he delivered an incendiary speech at Mount Vernon; he appealed the military verdict to the Supreme Court, arguing that he as a civilian could not be tried before a military tribunal. On appeal, the Supreme Court issued a unanimous ruling refusing to address Vallandigham's main argument that the military tribunal lacked jurisdiction to try him. Instead, they held that the Court was only authorized to take appeals as regulated by Congress – and Congress had never authorized them to take an appeal from a military tribunal, denying Vallandigham's appeal for lack of jurisdiction. Ex parte Vallandigham was cited by the Supreme Court in several important 20th Century cases, for example, Ex parte Quirin, and Youngstown Sheet & Tube Co. v. Sawyer.

== Citation style ==
Under the Judiciary Act of 1789 the federal court structure at the time comprised District Courts, which had general trial jurisdiction; Circuit Courts, which had mixed trial and appellate (from the US District Courts) jurisdiction; and the United States Supreme Court, which had appellate jurisdiction over the federal District and Circuit courts—and for certain issues over state courts. The Supreme Court also had limited original jurisdiction (i.e., in which cases could be filed directly with the Supreme Court without first having been heard by a lower federal or state court). There were one or more federal District Courts and/or Circuit Courts in each state, territory, or other geographical region.

Bluebook citation style is used for case names, citations, and jurisdictions.

- "C.C.D." = United States Circuit Court for the District of . . .
  - e.g.,"C.C.D.N.J." = United States Circuit Court for the District of New Jersey
- "D." = United States District Court for the District of . . .
  - e.g.,"D. Mass." = United States District Court for the District of Massachusetts
- "E." = Eastern; "M." = Middle; "N." = Northern; "S." = Southern; "W." = Western
  - e.g.,"C.C.S.D.N.Y." = United States Circuit Court for the Southern District of New York
  - e.g.,"M.D. Ala." = United States District Court for the Middle District of Alabama
- "Ct. Cl." = United States Court of Claims
- The abbreviation of a state's name alone indicates the highest appellate court in that state's judiciary at the time.
  - e.g.,"Pa." = Supreme Court of Pennsylvania
  - e.g.,"Me." = Supreme Judicial Court of Maine

== List of cases in 68 U.S. (1 Wall.) ==
Case Name	Page & year	Opinion of the Court	Concurring opinion(s)	Dissenting opinion(s)	Lower Court	Disposition
Cross v. De Valle	5 (1864)	Grier	none	none	C.C.D.R.I.	affirmed
Wright v. Ellison	16 (1864)	Swayne	none	none	C.C.D.C.	affirmed
Pomeroy's Lessee v. State Bank I	23 (1863)	Wayne	none	none	C.C.D. Ind.	dismissal denied
Clearwater v. Meredith	25 (1864)	Davis	none	none	C.C.D. Ind.	affirmed
The Commander-in-Chief	43 (1864)	Clifford	none	none	C.C.S.D.N.Y.	affirmed
Hutchins v. King	53 (1864)	Field	none	none	C.C.D.N.H.	affirmed
Dermott v. Wallach	61 (1864)	Nelson	none	none	C.C.D.C.	reversed
Ryan v. Bindley	66 (1864)	Davis	none	none	C.C.S.D. Ohio	reversed
Ex parte Dubuque & P.R.R.	69 (1864)	Catron	none	none	D. Iowa	mandamus granted
Orchard v. Hughes	73 (1864)	Nelson	none	none	Sup. Ct. Terr. Neb.	multiple
Eames v. Godfrey	78 (1864)	Davis	none	none	C.C.D. Mass.	reversed
Gaylords v. Kelshaw	81 (1864)	Miller	none	none	C.C.D. Ind.	remanded
Mercer Cnty. v. Hacket	83 (1864)	Grier	none	none	C.C.W.D. Pa.	affirmed
Bayne v. Morris	97 (1863)	Davis	none	none	C.C.D. Md.	reversed
Burr v. Des Moines et al. Co.	99 (1864)	Miller	none	none	C.C.D. Iowa	dismissed
United States v. Sepulveda	104 (1864)	Field	none	none	D. Cal.	reversed
Minnesota v. Bachelder	109 (1864)	Nelson	none	none	Minn.	reversed
Bridge P. v. Hoboken Co.	116 (1864)	Miller	none	none	N.J.	affirmed
Jones v. Morehead	155 (1864)	Miller	none	none	C.C.W.D. Pa.	reversed
Sweeny v. Easter	166 (1864)	Miller	none	none	C.C.D.C.	affirmed
Gelpcke v. City of Dubuque I	175 (1864)	Swayne	none	Miller	D. Iowa	reversed
Gelpcke v. City of Dubuque II	220 (1864)	Swayne	none	Miller	D. Iowa	reversed
Gelpcke v. City of Dubuque III	221 (1864)	Swayne	none	Miller	D. Iowa	reversed
Baldwin v. Hale	223 (1864)	Clifford	none	none	C.C.D. Mass.	affirmed
Baldwin v. Bank of Newbury	234 (1864)	Clifford	none	none	C.C.D. Mass.	affirmed
Ex parte Vallandigham	243 (1864)	Wayne	none	none	military commission	certiorari denied
Dunham v. Cincinnati et al. Ry. Co.	254 (1864)	Clifford	none	none	C.C.D. Ind.	reversed
Sturgis v. Clough	269 (1864)	Grier	none	none	C.C.S.D.N.Y.	affirmed
Seybert v. City of Pittsburgh	272 (1864)	Grier	none	none	C.C.W.D. Pa.	reversed
Gregg v. Von Phul	274 (1864)	Davis	none	none	C.C.N.D. Ill.	affirmed
Malarin v. United States	282 (1864)	Field	none	none	S.D. Cal.	reversed
Van Hostrup v. City of Madison	291 (1864)	Nelson	none	none	C.C.D. Ind.	reversed
Miller v. Tiffany	298 (1864)	Swayne	none	none	C.C.D. Ind.	affirmed
United States v. d'Aguirre	311 (1864)	Field	none	none	S.D. Cal.	affirmed
Godfrey v. Eames	317 (1864)	Swayne	none	none	C.C.D. Mass.	reversed
United States v. Johnson	326 (1864)	Grier	none	none	S.D. Cal.	affirmed
Jones v. Green	330 (1864)	Field	none	none	Sup. Ct. Terr. Neb.	reversed
Baker v. Gee	333 (1864)	Davis	none	none	C.C.D. Mo.	affirmed
Lee v. Watson	337 (1864)	Field	none	none	C.C.D. Ky.	dismissed
Bloomer v. Millinger	340 (1864)	Clifford	none	none	C.C.W.D. Pa.	affirmed
United States v. Auguisola	352 (1864)	Field	none	none	S.D. Cal.	affirmed
Schuchardt v. Allens	359 (1864)	Swayne	none	none	C.C.S.D.N.Y.	affirmed
Hardy v. Johnson	371 (1863)	Field	none	none	C.C.N.D. Cal.	affirmed
Iasigi & G. v. Collector	375 (1864)	Nelson	none	none	C.C.D. Mass.	affirmed
Meyer v. City of Muscatine	384 (1864)	Swayne	none	Miller	D. Iowa	reversed
Woods v. Freeman	398 (1864)	Davis	none	none	C.C.N.D. Ill.	affirmed
United States v. Moreno	400 (1864)	Swayne	none	none	S.D. Cal.	affirmed
Bronson v. La Crosse & M.R.R. Co.	405 (1864)	Nelson	none	Catron	D. Wis.	reversed
United States v. Yorba	412 (1864)	Field	none	none	S.D. Cal.	affirmed
Niswanger v. Saunders	424 (1864)	Catron	none	none	Ohio	reversed
United States v. Halleck	439 (1864)	Field	none	none	N.D. Cal.	affirmed
Orient M. Ins. Co. v. Wright	456 (1864)	Miller	Nelson	Swayne	not indicated	affirmed
Homer v. Collector	486 (1864)	Nelson	none	none	C.C.D. Mass.	certification
Turrill v. Michigan S.R.R. Co.	491 (1864)	Clifford	none	none	C.C.D. Mich.	reversed
Roosevelt v. Meyer	512 (1863)	Wayne	none	none	N.Y.	dismissed
Wheeler v. Sage	518 (1864)	Davis	none	none	D. Wis.	affirmed
Burr v. Duryee I	531 (1864)	Grier	none	none	C.C.D.N.J.	affirmed
Burr v. Duryee II	578 (1864)	per curiam	none	none	C.C.D.N.J.	affirmed
Burr v. Duryee III	579 (1864)	per curiam	none	none	C.C.D.N.J.	affirmed
Rodrigues v. United States	582 (1864)	Miller	none	none	N.D. Cal.	affirmed
Pomeroy's Lessee v. State Bank II	592 (1864)	Clifford	none	none	C.C.D. Ind.	affirmed
Spain v. Hamilton's Adm'r	604 (1864)	Wayne	none	none	C.C.D.C.	affirmed
Gray v. Brignardello	627 (1864)	Davis	none	none	C.C.N.D. Cal.	multiple
Beaver v. Taylor	637 (1864)	Swayne	none	none	C.C.S.D. Ill.	reversed
Rogers v. Marshal	644 (1864)	Davis	none	none	C.C.D. Wis.	affirmed
Blossom v. Milwaukee & C.R.R. Co.	655 (1864)	Miller	none	none	D. Wis.	dismissal denied
United States v. Vallejo	658 (1864)	Miller	none	none	S.D. Cal.	affirmed
White v. United States	660 (1864)	Swayne	none	none	N.D. Cal.	affirmed
The Resolute	682 (1864)	Clifford	none	none	not indicated	regs interpreted
Parker v. Phetteplace	684 (1864)	Nelson	none	none	C.C.D.R.I.	affirmed
United States v. Gomez	690 (1864)	Clifford	none	none	S.D. Cal.	dismissal denied
Houghton v. Jones	702 (1863)	Field	none	none	N.D. Cal.	affirmed
United States v. Morillo	706 (1864)	Miller	none	none	S.D. Cal.	dismissed
United States v. Estudillo	710 (1864)	Field	none	none	N.D. Cal.	dismissed
Romero v. United States	721 (1864)	Clifford	none	none	N.D. Cal.	affirmed
United States v. Workman	745 (1864)	Clifford	none	none	S.D. Cal.	reversed
United States v. Jones	766 (1864)	Clifford	none	none	S.D. Cal.	reversed

== See also ==
certificate of division
