= Heck v. Humphrey =

1999 U.S. Supreme Court case

- Supreme Court of the United States

Argued April 19, 1994 Decided June 24, 1994
- Full case name: Roy Heck v. James Humphrey et al.
- Citations: 512 U.S. 477 (more) 114 S. Ct. 2364; 129 L. Ed. 2d 383; 1972

Holding
- A defendant cannot claim damages for an allegedly unconstitutional conviction or imprisonment without showing that the conviction or sentence has been overturned in some way. The defendant must also exhaust state court remedies before bringing a §1983 action.

Court membership
- Chief Justice William Rehnquist Associate Justices Harry Blackmun · John P. Stevens; Sandra Day O'Connor · Antonin Scalia; Anthony Kennedy · David Souter; Clarence Thomas · Ruth Bader Ginsburg

Case opinions
- Majority: Scalia, joined by Rehnquist, Kennedy, Thomas, Ginsburg
- Concurrence: Thomas
- Concurrence: Souter (in judgment), joined by Blackmun, Stevens, O'Connor

Heck v. Humphrey, 512 U.S. 477 (1994), was a case in which the United States Supreme Court held that "in order to recover damages for allegedly unconstitutional conviction or imprisonment, or for other harm caused by actions whose unlawfulness would render a conviction or sentence invalid, a §1983 plaintiff must prove that the conviction or sentence has been reversed on direct appeal, expunged by executive order, declared invalid by a state tribunal authorized to make such determination, or called into question by a federal court's issuance of a writ of habeas corpus".
