= Nixon v. Shrink Missouri Government PAC =

- Supreme Court of the United States

Argued October 5, 1999 Decided January 24, 2000
- Full case name: Jeremiah W. (Jay) Nixon, Attorney General of Missouri, et al., Petitioners v. Shrink Missouri Government PAC, et al.
- Citations: 528 U.S. 377 (more) 120 S. Ct. 897; 145 L. Ed. 2d 886

Case history
- Prior: Shrink Mo. Gov't PAC v. Adams, 5 F. Supp. 2d 734 (E.D. Mo. 1998); injunction granted, 151 F.3d 763 (8th Cir. 1998); reversed, 161 F.3d 519 (8th Cir. 1998); cert. granted, 525 U.S. 1121 (1999).

Holding
- States can limit individual contributions to state political candidates, and those limits need not be pegged to the precise dollar amounts approved in Buckley v. Valeo (1976).

Court membership
- Chief Justice William Rehnquist Associate Justices John P. Stevens · Sandra Day O'Connor; Antonin Scalia · Anthony Kennedy; David Souter · Clarence Thomas; Ruth Bader Ginsburg · Stephen Breyer

Case opinions
- Majority: Souter, joined by Rehnquist, Stevens, O'Connor, Ginsburg, Breyer
- Concurrence: Stevens
- Concurrence: Breyer, joined by Ginsburg
- Dissent: Kennedy
- Dissent: Thomas, joined by Scalia

Nixon v. Shrink Missouri Government PAC, 528 U.S. 377 (2000), was a case in which the Supreme Court of the United States held that their earlier decision in Buckley v. Valeo (1976), upholding federal limits on campaign contributions also applied to state limits on campaign contributions to state offices.

== Background ==
Buckley v. Valeo established a "$1000 cap on individuals' contributions to candidates for federal office" in 1976. A 1998 statute increased the contribution limit to $1075 for statewide office candidates. In that year, Zev David Fredman filed suit alleging that "the Missouri statute imposing limits on contributions to candidates for state office violated" a candidates First and Fourteenth Amendment rights. Fredman further argued that he could only campaign effectively with contributions exceeding $1075. The Federal District Court upheld the statute on limitations to campaign donations. The Court of Appeals then reversed the decision finding that "Missouri's interest in avoiding the corruption or the perception of corruption caused by candidates' acceptance of large campaign contributions was insufficient to satisfy Buckly's strict scrutiny standard of review."

== Decision of the Supreme Court ==
Justice John Paul Stevens' concurrence questioned more than two decades of campaign finance jurisprudence, stating: "Money is property; it is not speech."

Professor D. Bruce La Pierre argued in front of the Court for the respondents. Patric Lester appeared on the brief. Missouri Attorney General Jay Nixon argued for the petitioners.

== See also ==
- List of United States Supreme Court cases, volume 528
- List of United States Supreme Court cases
- Lists of United States Supreme Court cases by volume
