= Cortez Byrd Chips, Inc. v. Bill Harbert Construction Co. =

- Supreme Court of the United States

Decided March 21, 2000
- Full case name: Cortez Byrd Chips, Inc. v. Bill Harbert Construction Co.
- Citations: 529 U.S. 193 (more)

Holding
- The Federal Arbitration Act's venue provisions are permissive, allowing a motion to confirm, vacate, or modify to be brought either in the district where the award was made or in any district proper under the general venue statute.

Court membership
- Chief Justice William Rehnquist Associate Justices John P. Stevens · Sandra Day O'Connor; Antonin Scalia · Anthony Kennedy; David Souter · Clarence Thomas; Ruth Bader Ginsburg · Stephen Breyer

Case opinion
- Majority: Souter, joined by unanimous

Laws applied
- Federal Arbitration Act

Cortez Byrd Chips, Inc. v. Bill Harbert Construction Co., 529 U.S. 193 (2000), was a United States Supreme Court case in which the court held that the Federal Arbitration Act's venue provisions are permissive, allowing a motion to confirm, vacate, or modify to be brought either in the district where the award was made or in any district proper under the general venue statute.

== Background ==
Cortez Byrd Chips, Inc., and Bill Harbert Construction Company agreed, among other things, that any disputes arising from Harbert's construction of a Mississippi mill for Cortez Byrd would be decided by arbitration. When such a dispute arose, arbitration was conducted in Alabama and Harbert received an award. Cortez Byrd sought to vacate or modify the award in the Federal District Court for the Southern District of Mississippi, where the contract was performed; and seven days later Harbert sought to confirm the award in the Federal District Court for the Northern District of Alabama. The latter court refused to dismiss, transfer, or stay its action, concluding that venue was proper only there, and it entered judgment for Harbert. The Eleventh Circuit Court of Appeals held that, under the Federal Arbitration Act (FAA), venue for motions to confirm, vacate, or modify awards was exclusively in the district where the arbitration award was made, and thus venue in this case was limited to the Alabama court.

There was a circuit split between circuits like the Eleventh Circuit, which interpreted the venue provision as mandatory, and others that interpreted it as permissive. Under a permissive interpretation, a motion to confirm, vacate, or modify could be brought either in the district where the award was made or in any district proper under the general venue statute.

The Supreme Court granted certiorari.

== Opinion of the court ==
The Supreme Court issued an opinion on March 21, 2000.

The court stressed that a statute's use of permissive language does not automatically meant that a provision is permissive. The statute's structure and legislative purpose are supposed to guide courts trying to determine that.
