= United States v. Locke =

- Supreme Court of the United States

Argued December 7, 1999 Decided March 6, 2000
- Full case name: United States, Petitioner v. Gary Locke, Governor of Washington, et al.; International Association of Independent Tanker Owners (INTERTANKO), Petitioner v. Gary Locke, Governor of Washington, et al.
- Citations: 529 U.S. 89 (more) 120 S. Ct. 1135; 146 L. Ed. 2d 69; 2000 U.S. LEXIS 1895; 68 U.S.L.W. 4184; 50 ERC (BNA) 1097; 2000 OSHD (CCH) ¶ 32,038; 2000 AMC 913; 2000 Cal. Daily Op. Service 1763; 2000 Daily Journal DAR 2409; 30 ELR 20438; 2000 Colo. J. C.A.R. 1233; 13 Fla. L. Weekly Fed. S 151
- Argument: Oral argument

Holding
- Federal commerce laws override state and local laws regarding interstate commerce.

Court membership
- Chief Justice William Rehnquist Associate Justices John P. Stevens · Sandra Day O'Connor; Antonin Scalia · Anthony Kennedy; David Souter · Clarence Thomas; Ruth Bader Ginsburg · Stephen Breyer

Case opinion
- Majority: Kennedy, joined by unanimous

Laws applied
- U.S. Const. art. I, § 8, cl. 3

United States v. Locke, 529 U.S. 89 (2000), was a United States Supreme Court case in which the Court unanimously held that certain state regulations regarding oil tankers and oil barges are preempted under the Supremacy Clause of the United States Constitution in deference to the extensive body of federal regulations affecting these classes of vessels.

== Background ==
The 1989 Exxon Valdez oil spill severely affected the environment of Prince William Sound, Alaska, United States. In the wake of that spill, the state of Washington passed a law authorizing the state Office of Marine Safety to regulate certain aspects of tanker and oil barge operations when calling on Washington state ports. Specifically, the Office of Marine Safety adopted regulations requiring tank vessel operators to submit an oil spill prevention plan for state review and approval. The United States Department of Justice led by Attorney General, Janet Reno filed suit against Washington for adopting rules in an area of law in which the United States Coast Guard had long occupied the field of regulatory activity. The basis of the suit was that the Supremacy Clause of the United States Constitution prohibited states from enacting legislation and rules in fields where the United States Congress intended the Coast Guard to have complete authority, particularly when such regulation could affect interstate and international commerce.

== Opinion of the Court ==
The case reached the Supreme Court of the United States on December 7, 1999. The court unanimously held that Congress intended the United States Coast Guard to be the sole national authority regarding the design, construction, maintenance and certain operational requirements of tank vessels. Following the decision, Washington State withdrew the offending regulations.

== Subsequent developments ==
This unanimous decision upheld and expanded previous case law, including Gibbons v. Ogden and Ray v. Atlantic Richfield regarding the federal government's strong role and preemptive powers in regulating interstate commerce. The court found that the states cannot pass laws that interfere with the federal government's authority over interstate commerce when a federal agency is granted exclusive jurisdiction by the United States Congress. The Supremacy Clause of the United States Constitution provides that "this Constitution, and the Laws of the United States which shall be made in Pursuance thereof; and all Treaties made, or which shall be made, under the Authority of the United States, shall be the supreme Law of the Land." The Commerce Clause in Article I Section 8 of the United States Constitution provides that "Congress shall have Power...to regulate Commerce with foreign Nations, and among the several States, and with the Indian Tribes." The previous decisions set the basis for the government to use these enumerated powers as "...necessary and proper..." also stated in the Constitution. These federal powers are likely to remain in tension with the powers of the states as articulated in the 10th amendment to the United States Constitution as adopted in the Bill of Rights. The Tenth Amendment provides that, "The powers not delegated to the United States by the Constitution, nor prohibited by it to the States, are reserved to the States respectively, or to the people."

The Court held that "Washington's regulations regarding general navigation watch procedures, crew English language skills and training, and maritime casualty reporting are pre-empted by the comprehensive federal regulatory scheme governing oil tankers; the case is remanded so the validity of other Washington regulations may be assessed in light of the considerable federal interest at stake." The state of Washington did not pursue the remand back to the 9th Circuit Court of Appeals, but withdrew all of its regulations related to tank vessel oil spill prevention plans.

== See also ==
- Federal preemption
