= Fischer v. United States (2000) =

- Supreme Court of the United States

Argued February 22, 2000 Decided April 17, 2000
- Full case name: Jeffrey Fischer v. United States of America
- Citations: 529 U.S. 667 (more) 168 F.3d. L. Ed. 2d 1273
- Argument: Oral argument

Holding
- Medicare funds received by health care providers constitute "benefits" within the meaning of the federal bribery statute prohibiting fraud and other offenses against organizations receiving federal benefits

Court membership
- Chief Justice William Rehnquist Associate Justices John P. Stevens · Sandra Day O'Connor; Antonin Scalia · Anthony Kennedy; David Souter · Clarence Thomas; Ruth Bader Ginsburg · Stephen Breyer

Case opinions
- Majority: Kennedy, joined by Rehnquist, Stevens, O'Connor, Souter, Ginsburg, Breyer
- Dissent: Thomas, joined by Scalia

Fischer v United States, 529 U.S. 667 (2000), was a United States Supreme Court case that ruled that the scope of the federal bribery statute 18 U.S.C. § 666(b), which applied to organizations that received "benefits in excess of $10,000 under a Federal program", included funds received through Medicare.

== Opinion of the Court ==
In a 7-2 opinion written by Justice Anthony M. Kennedy, the Court held that, "The government has a legitimate and significant interest in prohibiting financial fraud or acts of bribery being perpetrated upon Medicare providers.... Fraudulent acts threaten the program's integrity...."

=== Thomas' dissent ===
Justice Clarence Thomas, joined by Antonin Scalia, argued that Medicare funds did not constitute bribery as the only people who ultimately received the benefits were patients.
