= New York v. Hill =

Supreme Court Case

- Supreme Court of the United States

Argued November 2, 1999 Decided January 11, 2000
- Full case name: New York v. Michael Hill
- Citations: 528 U.S. 110 (more) 120 S. Ct. 659; 145 L. Ed. 2d 560; 2000 U.S. LEXIS 262

Case history
- Prior: Motion to dismiss indictment denied, Monroe County Court, New York; conviction affirmed, 244 A.D.2d 927, 668 N.Y.S.2d 126 (N.Y. App. Div. 1997); reversed and indictment dismissed, 92 N.Y.2d 406, 704 N.E.2d 542 (N.Y. 1998); cert. granted, 526 U.S. 1111 (1999)

Holding
- A defense counsel’s agreement to a trial date outside the 180-day period provided by Article III of the Interstate Agreement on Detainers waives the defendant’s right to seek dismissal on the ground that the trial did not occur within that period.

Court membership
- Chief Justice William Rehnquist Associate Justices John P. Stevens · Sandra Day O'Connor; Antonin Scalia · Anthony Kennedy; David Souter · Clarence Thomas; Ruth Bader Ginsburg · Stephen Breyer

Case opinion
- Majority: Scalia, joined by unanimous

Laws applied
- Interstate Agreement on Detainers

New York v. Hill, 528 U.S. 110 (2000), was a United States Supreme Court case in which the Court unanimously decided that scheduling of a trial date outside the 180-day period of Article III of the Interstate Agreement on Detainers Act (IAD) by a defendant's counsel waived the defendant's right to dismissal on the ground that the trial did not occur within that period. The court clarified that decisions about scheduling are among those entrusted to counsel and do not require a defendant's personal consent. The trial court declared that the defense counsel's agreement to hold the trial after that period waivered Hill's IAD rights.

== Background ==
Michael Hill, an Ohio state prisoner, was the subject of a detainer lodged by New York authorities on pending murder and robbery charges. Hill invoked Article III of the IAD, requesting resolution of the detainer, and was transferred to New York for trial. His counsel filed several pretrial motions, tolling the 180-day clock during their pendency.

On January 9, 1995, during a scheduling hearing, the prosecutor proposed May 1 as a trial date. The trial judge asked defense counsel whether that date was acceptable, and counsel responded, "That will be fine, Your Honor". The court set the trial for May 1, which fell beyond the 180-day period.

Before trial, Hill moved to dismiss the indictment on the ground that the IAD's time limit had expired. The trial court denied the motion, holding that defense counsel's explicit agreement to the trial date constituted a waiver of Hill's IAD rights. Hill was subsequently convicted of second-degree murder and first-degree robbery. The Appellate Division of the New York Supreme Court affirmed the conviction, but the New York Court of Appeals reversed, ruling that defense counsel's agreement did not waive Hill's speedy-trial rights under the IAD and ordering dismissal of the indictment. The Supreme Court granted certiorari.

== Opinion of the court ==
Justice Scalia delivered the unanimous opinion reversing the New York Court of Appeals. The Supreme Court held that defense counsel's agreement to a trial date outside the IAD's statutory time frame constituted a waiver of the defendant’s right to dismissal on speedy-trial grounds, stating, "[w]hat suffices for waiver depends on the nature of the right at issue". While certain fundamental rights, such as the right to counsel or the right to enter a not guilty plea, require a defendant's personal waiver, many procedural rights may be waived by counsel acting on the defendant's behalf, including decisions about scheduling.

Accordingly, the Court reversed the judgment of the New York Court of Appeals and reinstated Hill's conviction.
