= List of United States Supreme Court cases, volume 529 =

This is a list of all the United States Supreme Court cases from volume 529 of the United States Reports:

Case name	Citation	Date decided
Shalala v. Illinois Council on Long Term Care, Inc.	529 U.S. 1	2000
United States v. Johnson	529 U.S. 53	March 1, 2000
Portuondo v. Agard	529 U.S. 61	2000
A prosecutor's mention that a defendant testified after all other witnesses during their closing does not violate a defendant's constitutional rights.
United States v. Locke	529 U.S. 89	2000
FDA v. Brown & Williamson Tobacco Corp.	529 U.S. 120	2000
Cortez Byrd Chips, Inc. v. Bill Harbert Constr. Co.	529 U.S. 193	2000
The Federal Arbitration Act's venue provisions are permissive, allowing a motion to confirm, vacate, or modify to be brought either in the district where the award was made or in any district proper under the general venue statute.
Wal-Mart Stores, Inc. v. Samara Brothers, Inc.	529 U.S. 205	2000
Board of Regents of the University of Wisconsin System v. Southworth	529 U.S. 217	2000
Garner v. Jones	529 U.S. 244	2000
Florida v. J. L.	529 U.S. 266	2000
Erie v. Pap's A. M.	529 U.S. 277	2000
Free v. Abbott Laboratories, Inc.	529 U.S. 333	2000
Affirmed by an equally divided court. O'Connor did not participate.
Bond v. United States	529 U.S. 334	2000
Norfolk Southern R. Co. v. Shanklin	529 U.S. 344	2000
The Federal Railroad Safety Act, in conjunction with §§ 646.214(b)(3) and (4), pre-empts state tort claims concerning a railroad's failure to maintain adequate warning devices at crossings where federal funds have participated in the devices' installation.
Williams v. Taylor (Terry Williams)	529 U.S. 362	2000
Williams v. Taylor (Michael Williams)	529 U.S. 420	2000
Edwards v. Carpenter	529 U.S. 446	2000
A procedurally defaulted ineffective-assistance claim can serve as cause to excuse the procedural default of another habeas claim only if the habeas petitioner can satisfy the "cause and prejudice" standard with respect to the ineffective-assistance claim itself.
Nelson v. Adams USA, Inc.	529 U.S. 460	2000
Due process, as reflected in Rule 15 of the Federal Rules of Civil Procedure as well as Rule 12, requires a party to be given an opportunity to respond and contest their personal liability for a fee award after being made a party and before the entry of a judgment against them.
Slack v. McDaniel	529 U.S. 473	2000
Beck v. Prupis	529 U.S. 494	2000
Injury caused by an overt act that is not an act of racketeering or otherwise wrongful under RICO does not give rise to a cause of action under RICO Act § 1964(c) for a violation of § 1962(d).
Carmell v. Texas	529 U.S. 513	2000
Christensen v. Harris County	529 U.S. 576	2000
United States v. Morrison	529 U.S. 598	2000
Fischer v. United States	529 U.S. 667	2000
Johnson v. United States	529 U.S. 694	2000
Public Lands Council v. Babbitt	529 U.S. 728	2000
Ohler v. United States	529 U.S. 753	2000
A defendant who preemptively introduces evidence of a prior conviction on direct examination may not challenge the admission of such evidence on appeal.
Vermont Agency of Natural Resources v. United States ex rel. Stevens	529 U.S. 765	2000
United States v. Playboy Entertainment Group, Inc.	529 U.S. 803	2000
Jones v. United States	529 U.S. 848	2000
Geier v. American Honda Motor Co.	529 U.S. 861	May 22, 2000
