= United States v. Johnson (1863) =

- Supreme Court of the United States

Argued January 26, 1863 Decided February 15, 1863
- Full case name: United States v. Johnson
- Citations: 68 U.S. 326 (more) 1 Wall. 326; 17 L. Ed. 597; 1863 U.S. LEXIS 466

Court membership
- Chief Justice Roger B. Taney Associate Justices James M. Wayne · John Catron; Samuel Nelson · Robert C. Grier; Nathan Clifford · Noah H. Swayne; Samuel F. Miller · David Davis

Case opinion
- Majority: Grier, joined by unanimous

United States v. Johnson, 68 U.S. (1 Wall.) 326 (1863), was a United States Supreme Court case.

== Background ==
Johnson and others (respondents) claimed title to a tract of land under the Mexican government. Their grantor, Chaves, had received a deed in 1845 from Pio Pico, a Mexican governor of California. The deed recited that "the necessary steps and investigations were previously taken and made in conformity with the requirements of laws and regulations." On the 8th May, 1846, the espediente was laid before the Departmental Assembly, and was ordered to be referred to the Committee on Vacant Lands. As a house had been built on the land by a community of priests, of the mission of St. Antonio, the committee recommended that "the expedient be remitted to the authorities of that jurisdiction to be reported on, and to the person in charge of San Antonio, in order that he may say in what condition that house was at the time the grant was made, so that it might be valued, and that community be indemnified, to avoid questions relative to the expedient, to the end that, after these proceedings are concluded, the respective approval may be given."

Some of the deeds through which the claimants based their title had slight irregularities in various signatures. With these documents and this evidence, Johnson and the other claimants having presented their petition to the Board of Commissioners established by the act of March 3d, 1851, "to ascertain and settle private land claims in the State of California," and that board having confirmed it, the United States took the case by appeal into the District Court, which court having also confirmed it, the case came to the Supreme Court: the question being whether the petition for confirmation of the claim was rightly granted and affirmed.

== Procedural posture ==
Appellant United States challenged a decision from the District Court of the United States for the Southern District of California, which affirmed a decision from the Board of Commissioners in favor of respondents, several claimants to California land who claimed title under the Mexican government through a common grantor.

The issue was whether the petition for confirmation of the claim was rightly granted and affirmed. The grantor's title, which was not disputed before the Commissioners or the district court, was first objected to on appeal to the court. The government contended that the governor and secretary should have been called as the proper witnesses to authenticate their own acts.

== Opinion of the court ==
The court affirmed. It was not the duty of counsel representing the government to urge microscopic objections against honest claimants and urge the forfeiture of property for some oversight of the Commissioners in not requiring proof according to the strict rules of common law.

1. Objections to Mexican grants ought not to be taken as if the case was pending on a writ of error, with a bill of exceptions to the admission of every item of testimony offered and received below.
2. When there is any just suspicion of fraud or forgery, the defence should be made below, and the evidence to support the charge should appear on the record.
3. The want of approval of a grant by the Departmental Assembly does not affect its validity.
