= Nelson v. Adams USA, Inc. =

- Supreme Court of the United States

Decided April 25, 2000
- Full case name: Nelson v. Adams USA, Inc.
- Citations: 529 U.S. 460 (more)

Holding
- Due process requires a party to be given an opportunity to respond and contest their personal liability for a fee award after being made a party and before the entry of a judgment against them.

Court membership
- Chief Justice William Rehnquist Associate Justices John P. Stevens · Sandra Day O'Connor; Antonin Scalia · Anthony Kennedy; David Souter · Clarence Thomas; Ruth Bader Ginsburg · Stephen Breyer

Case opinion
- Majority: Ginsburg, joined by unanimous

Laws applied
- Federal Rules of Civil Procedure

Nelson v. Adams USA, Inc., 529 U.S. 460 (2000), was a United States Supreme Court case in which the court held that due process requires a party to be given an opportunity to respond and contest their personal liability for a fee award after being made a party and before the entry of a judgment against them. This principle is written into the Federal Rules of Civil Procedure 15 and 12.

== Background ==
Ohio Cellular Products Corporation (OCP) sued Adams USA, Inc. (Adams), for patent infringement. The federal District Court dismissed OCP's claim and ordered OCP to pay Adams' costs and attorney fees. In awarding costs and fees, the court determined that petitioner Nelson, president and sole shareholder of OCP, had deceitfully withheld from the United States Patent and Trademark Office prior art that rendered OCP's patents invalid, and that this behavior constituted inequitable conduct chargeable to OCP. Fearing that OCP might be unable to pay the fee, Adams moved under Rule 15 of the Federal Rules of Civil Procedure to amend its pleading to add Nelson, personally, as a party from whom fees could be collected. Adams also asked the court, under Rule 59(e), to amend the judgment to make Nelson immediately liable for the fee award. The District Court granted Adams' motion in full. In affirming the judgment entered against Nelson, the Federal Circuit acknowledged that it was "uncommon" to add a party after the entry of judgment. Nevertheless, Nelson had not demonstrated prejudice, the Court of Appeals concluded, because he made no showing that anything different or additional would have been done to stave off the judgment had he been a party, in his individual capacity, from the outset. That court, over a vigorous dissent, was apparently satisfied that the District Court's simultaneous allowance of the pleading amendment and entry of judgment satisfied due process.

The Supreme Court granted certiorari.

== Opinion of the court ==
The Supreme Court issued an opinion on April 25, 2000.
