= Elizabeth Allgeier =

American psychologist and sexologist (1941–2016)

- Born: March 4, 1941
- Died: October 9, 2016 (aged 75)
- Education: Purdue University (PhD)
- Occupations: Psychologist, sexologist
- Scientific career
- Fields: Psychology, sexology

Elizabeth Rice Allgeier (March 4, 1941 – October 9, 2016) was an American psychologist and sexologist. She was the Editor of the Journal of Sex Research in the 1990s. She was Professor Emeritus of Psychology at Bowling Green State University. She joined BGSU in 1980 and retired in 2004. She received her PhD from Purdue University. She was a Fellow of the Society for the Scientific Study of Sexuality, serving as its president between 1985 and 1986. She was one of the experts to file an amicus brief in United States v. Playboy Entertainment Group.
