= Vermont Agency of Natural Resources v. United States ex rel. Stevens =

2000 United States Supreme Court case on the False Claims Act

- Supreme Court of the United States

Argued November 29, 1999 Decided May 22, 2000
- Full case name: Vermont Agency of Natural Resources v. United States ex rel. Stevens
- Docket no.: 98-1828
- Citations: 529 U.S. 765 (more) 120 S. Ct. 1858
- Argument: Oral argument
- Opinion announcement: Opinion announcement

Holding
- A private person may not bring suit in federal Court on behalf of the United States against a state or state agency under the False Claims Act.

Court membership
- Chief Justice William Rehnquist Associate Justices John P. Stevens · Sandra Day O'Connor; Antonin Scalia · Anthony Kennedy; David Souter · Clarence Thomas; Ruth Bader Ginsburg · Stephen Breyer

Case opinions
- Majority: Scalia, joined by Rehnquist, O'Connor, Kennedy, Thomas, Breyer
- Concurrence: Breyer
- Concurrence: Ginsburg, joined by Breyer
- Dissent: Stevens, joined by Souter

Laws applied
- False Claims Act of 1863

Vermont Agency of Natural Resources v. United States ex rel. Stevens, 529 U.S. 765 (2000), was a United States Supreme Court case in which the Court held that a private person may not bring suit in a federal court on behalf of the United States against a State (or state agency) under the False Claims Act.

== Background ==
The FCA includes a qui tam provision that a private person (the relator) may file actions on behalf of the U.S. government against any "person" who presents to the government a false or fraudulent claim for payment. The relator stands to receive a share of any recovered damages.

Relator Stevens, a former employee of the Vermont Agency of Natural Resources, brought a qui tam civil action against the agency, alleging that the state agency had submitted false claims to the U.S. Environmental Protection Agency (EPA) in connection with federal grant programs the EPA administered.

At the U.S. District Court for the District of Vermont, the Vermont state agency moved to dismiss, arguing that a State or state agency is not a "person" subject to FCA liability and that a qui tam action in federal court against a State is barred by the Eleventh Amendment of the U.S. Constitution.

The district court denied the motion, and the Vermont state agency appealed. The United States intervened in the appeal in support of relator Stevens. The U.S. Court of Appeals for the Second Circuit affirmed.

The Supreme Court granted certiorari to Vermont and heard the oral argument on November 29, 1999.

== Opinion of the Court ==
The Supreme Court reversed the judgment of the Court of Appeals.

In a decision delivered by Justice Scalia, the Court held that the FCA does not subject a State (or state agency) to liability in a federal court suit by a private person on behalf of the United States because such a State or agency is not a "person" subject to qui tam liability under 31 U.S.C. § 3729(a). The Court also held that Stevens had standing under the FCA as the Government's damages claim is partially assigned to him, citing Steel Co. v. Citizens for Better Environment, 523 U.S. 83 (1998).

Justice Ginsburg, with whom Justice Breyer joined, concurred in the judgment. Justice Stevens, with whom Justice Souter joined, dissented.

== See also ==
- Cook County v. United States ex rel. Chandler
