= Florida v. J. L. =

- Supreme Court of the United States

Argued February 29, 2000 Decided March 28, 2000
- Full case name: Florida v. J. L.
- Citations: 529 U.S. 266 (more) 120 S. Ct. 1375; 146 L. Ed. 2d 254; 2000 U.S. LEXIS 2345; 68 U.S.L.W. 4236; 2000 Cal. Daily Op. Service 2409; 2000 Daily Journal DAR 3226; 2000 Colo. J. C.A.R. 1642; 13 Fla. L. Weekly Fed. S 216

Holding
- A police officer may not legally stop and frisk anyone based solely on an anonymous tip that simply described that person's location and appearance without information as to any illegal conduct that the person might be planning.

Court membership
- Chief Justice William Rehnquist Associate Justices John P. Stevens · Sandra Day O'Connor; Antonin Scalia · Anthony Kennedy; David Souter · Clarence Thomas; Ruth Bader Ginsburg · Stephen Breyer

Case opinions
- Majority: Ginsburg, joined by a unanimous court
- Concurrence: Kennedy, joined by Rehnquist

Laws applied
- U.S. Const. amend. IV

Florida v. J. L., 529 U.S. 266 (2000), was a United States Supreme Court case in which the Court determined that a police officer may not legally stop and frisk someone based solely on an anonymous tip that describes a person's location and appearance, but does not furnish information as to any illegal conduct.

== Facts and procedural history ==
In 1995 the Miami-Dade Police Department received an anonymous tip that a young black male was at a bus stop wearing a plaid shirt and carrying a firearm. The police went to the bus stop and saw three young black men, one wearing a plaid shirt. Acting solely on the tip (the officers did not observe any criminal or suspicious behavior), they searched all three, and found a pistol in the pocket of the man wearing the plaid shirt.

At trial the court granted the juvenile defendant's motion to suppress evidence as fruit of an unreasonable search and seizure. However, the Florida Third District Court of Appeal reversed the trial court. J.L. appealed the decision to the Florida Supreme Court, which overruled the decision of the District Court of Appeal, holding that the tip did not give sufficient indicia of reliability to justify a stop and frisk of the subject. The appellee sought certiorari review from the United States Supreme Court.

== Opinion of the Court ==
The United States Supreme Court held in a unanimous opinion by Justice Ruth Bader Ginsburg that the search was unreasonable. That the tip accurately identified the defendant and that the allegation of the firearm ultimately proved to be accurate was insufficient to justify the seizure. For a completely anonymous tip to justify even a "stop and frisk" of a suspect pursuant to Terry v. Ohio, 392 U.S. 1 (1968), it must be "suitably corroborated" with both the accurate prediction of future activity of the subject and accurate in its assertion of potential criminal activity. The tip given in the J.L. case was only sufficient to identify the subject and nothing more, making the police reliance upon it unjustified.

The Court further declined to create a standard "firearms exception" to the Terry doctrine, as was recognized in some Federal circuits, stating, among other things, that "[s]uch an exception would enable any person seeking to harass another to set in motion an intrusive, embarrassing police search of the targeted person simply by placing an anonymous call falsely reporting the target's unlawful carriage of a gun . . . ."

== See also ==
- Navarette v. California
- List of United States Supreme Court cases, volume 529
