= Slack v. McDaniel =

- Supreme Court of the United States

Argued October 4, 1999 Reargued March 29, 2000 Decided April 26, 2000
- Full case name: Antonio Slack v. McDaniel, Warden, et al.
- Citations: 529 U.S. 473 (more) 120 S. Ct. 1595; 146 L. Ed. 2d 542

Court membership
- Chief Justice William Rehnquist Associate Justices John P. Stevens · Sandra Day O'Connor; Antonin Scalia · Anthony Kennedy; David Souter · Clarence Thomas; Ruth Bader Ginsburg · Stephen Breyer

Case opinions
- Majority: Kennedy, joined by unanimous court (part I); Rehnquist, O'Connor, Scalia, Thomas, Ginsburg (part II); Rehnquist, Stevens, O'Connor, Souter, Ginsburg, Breyer (parts III, IV)
- Concurrence: Stevens, joined by Souter, Breyer
- Concur/dissent: Scalia, joined by Thomas

Slack v. McDaniel, 529 U.S. 473 (2000), was a United States Supreme Court case in which the Court held that under the Antiterrorism and Effective Death Penalty Act of 1996, a certificate of appealability must be issued by a circuit Justice of judge before an appeal can proceed. The certificate of appealability (COA) may only be issued if the applicant "has made a substantial showing of the denial of a constitutional right."

== Background ==
Antonio Slack was convicted of second-degree murder in Nevada in 1990. After losing on appeal, he filed a federal petition for habeas corpus to challenge the lawfulness off his imprisonment. He wanted to include new claims he had not yet presented to state courts, but could not proceed because of the unexhausted claims. The district court allowed Slack to file again after he exhausted the claims in state courts. In 1998 the court dismissed the petition because it included new claims, and the court said Slack was abusing the process with unnecessarily repetitive litigation. The Supreme Court granted certiorari to decide if Slack's mixed petition was a "second or successive petition".

== Supreme Court ==
=== Opinion of the Court ===
After deciding that the Antiterrorism and Effective Death Penalty Act applied to Slack's appeal, the Court ruled that procedural rulings may be appealed under the Barefoot v. Estelle standard (as codified by the AEDPA 28 U.S.C. § 2253(c)). The standard for a "Certificate of Appealability" requires only that reasonable jurists could debate or disagree with the court's procedural ruling. The Ashwander rule still applies: "[The] Court will not pass upon a constitutional question although properly presented by the record, if there is also present some other ground upon which the case may be disposed of."

When a district court refuses to hear a case based on procedural issues, rather than constitutional claims, a person wanting a Certificate of Appealability under AEDPA's standard must show two things: first, that there is a reasonable debate about whether their constitutional claim is valid, and second that there is a reasonable debate about whether the district court was right in its procedural decision. If the court finds that the procedural reasons given for dismissing the case were clearly correct, then there is no ground for an appeal. The Supreme Court said the district court wrongly decided that Slack's petition was a "second or successive petition".

Since Slack's petition was wrongly dismissed on procedural grounds, his constitutional claims were not adjudicated on the merits, therefore Slack's constitutional claims could still be heard after exhausting state remedies, along with new claims that developed during the exhaustion of state remedies. The Court emphasized that existing federal procedural rules were adequate for managing abusive and repetitive filings and noted it would be an unfair disadvantage for prisoners with no alternatives to filing their postconviction appeals pro se.
