= List of United States Supreme Court cases, volume 528 =

This is a list of all United States Supreme Court cases from volume 528 of the United States Reports:

Case name	Citation	Date decided
Brancato v. Gunn	528 U.S. 1	October 12, 1999
Antonelli v. Caridine	528 U.S. 3	1999
Judd v. United States Dist. Court for Western Dist. of Tex.	528 U.S. 5	1999
Dempsey v. Martin	528 U.S. 7	1999
Prunty v. Brooks	528 U.S. 9	1999
Flippo v. West Virginia	528 U.S. 11	1999
In re Bauer	528 U.S. 16	1999
Texas v. Lesage	528 U.S. 18	1999
Fiore v. White	528 U.S. 23	1999
Los Angeles Police Dept. v. United Reporting Publishing Corp.	528 U.S. 32	1999
Drye v. United States	528 U.S. 49	1999
Kimel v. Florida Bd. of Regents	528 U.S. 62	2000
New York v. Hill	528 U.S. 110	2000
Illinois v. Wardlow	528 U.S. 119	2000
Reno v. Condon	528 U.S. 141	2000
Martinez v. Court of Appeal of Cal., Fourth Appellate Dist.	528 U.S. 152	2000
An appellant in a criminal case does not have the constitutional right to refuse counsel on direct appeal.
Friends of Earth, Inc. v. Laidlaw Environmental Services (TOC), Inc.	528 U.S. 167	2000
Adarand Constructors, Inc. v. Slater	528 U.S. 216	2000
Weeks v. Angelone	528 U.S. 225	2000
The Constitution is not violated when a trial judge directs a capital jury's attention to a specific paragraph of a constitutionally sufficient instruction in response to a question regarding the proper consideration of mitigating evidence.
Gutierrez v. Ada	528 U.S. 250	2000
The Guam Organic Act does not require a runoff election when a candidate slate has received a majority of the votes cast for Governor and Lieutenant Governor of the Territory, but not a majority of the number of ballots cast in the simultaneous general election.
Smith v. Robbins	528 U.S. 259	2000
The Anders procedure is only one method of satisfying the Constitution's requirements for indigent criminal appeals; the States are free to adopt different procedures, so long as those procedures adequately safeguard a defendant's right to appellate counsel.
United States v. Martinez-Salazar	528 U.S. 304	2000
A defendant's exercise of peremptory challenges pursuant to Rule 24 is not denied or impaired when the defendant chooses to use such a challenge to remove a juror who should have been excused for cause.
Reno v. Bossier Parish School Bd.	528 U.S. 320	2000
Nixon v. Shrink Missouri Government PAC	528 U.S. 377	2000
Baral v. United States	528 U.S. 431	2000
Remittances of estimated income tax and withholding tax are "paid" on the due date of a calendar year taxpayer's income tax return.
Weisgram v. Marley Co.	528 U.S. 440	2000
Rule 50 permits an appellate court to direct the entry of judgment as a matter of law when it determines that evidence was erroneously admitted at trial and that the remaining, properly admitted, evidence is insufficient to constitute a submissible case.
Hunt-Wesson, Inc. v. Franchise Tax Bd. of Cal.	528 U.S. 458	2000
Roe v. Flores-Ortega	528 U.S. 470	2000
Strickland v. Washington provides the proper framework for evaluating a claim that counsel was constitutionally ineffective for failing to file a notice of appeal.
Rice v. Cayetano	528 U.S. 495	2000
Rotella v. Wood	528 U.S. 549	2000
Village of Willowbrook v. Olech	528 U.S. 562	2000
The Equal Protection Clause gives rise to a cause of action on behalf of a "class of one" where the plaintiff does not allege membership in a class or group, but alleges that she has been intentionally treated differently from others similarly situated and that there is no rational basis for such treatment.
