= Board of Regents of the University of Wisconsin System v. Southworth =

- Supreme Court of the United States

Argued November 9, 1999 Decided March 22, 2000
- Full case name: Board of Regents of Univ. of Wis. System v. Southworth
- Citations: 529 U.S. 217 (more) 120 S. Ct. 1346; 146 L. Ed. 2d 193; 2000 U.S. LEXIS 2196; 68 U.S.L.W. 4220; 2000 Cal. Daily Op. Service 2265; 2000 Daily Journal DAR 3049; 2000 Colo. J. C.A.R. 1471; 13 Fla. L. Weekly Fed. S 197

Case history
- Prior: Southworth v. Grebe, 151 F.3d 717 (7th Cir. 1998); rehearing denied, 157 F.3d 1124 (7th Cir. 1998); cert. granted, 526 U.S. 1038 (1999).

Holding
- Public universities may subsidize campus groups by means of a mandatory student activity fee without violating the students' First Amendment rights.

Court membership
- Chief Justice William Rehnquist Associate Justices John P. Stevens · Sandra Day O'Connor; Antonin Scalia · Anthony Kennedy; David Souter · Clarence Thomas; Ruth Bader Ginsburg · Stephen Breyer

Case opinions
- Majority: Kennedy, joined by Rehnquist, O'Connor, Scalia, Thomas, Ginsburg
- Concurrence: Souter (in judgment), joined by Stevens, Breyer

Laws applied
- U.S. Const. amend. I

Board of Regents of the University of Wisconsin System v. Southworth, 529 U.S. 217 (2000), is a ruling by the Supreme Court of the United States which held that public universities may subsidize campus groups by means of a mandatory student activity fee without violating the students' First Amendment rights.

== Background ==
On April 2, 1996, three law students at the University of Wisconsin–Madison sued in federal court challenging the constitutionality of the university's mandatory student fee system, arguing that it was unconstitutional for portions of their student fee to fund political or ideological activities with which they disagreed. The plaintiff students were particularly concerned with multi-cultural groups, environmental groups, and lesbian, gay, bisexual and transgender groups. The Board of Regents and the university system defended the fee system.

On November 29, 1996, the U.S. District Court for the Western District of Wisconsin in Southworth v. Grebe granted summary judgment in favor of the three law students. The district court ruled that the fee system violated the students' free-speech rights by compelling them to fund speech they disagreed with. On August 10, 1998, a three-judge panel of the 7th U.S. Circuit Court of Appeals in Southworth v. Grebe upheld the district court decision in favor of the three students. The appeals court panel concluded that the university funding of private political speech was not germane to its mission and that even if it were the university did not have a compelling reason to require students to fund speech they opposed.

On October 27, 1998, the full 7th U.S. Circuit Court of Appeals denied a petition for rehearing. The University of Wisconsin appealed the case to the Supreme Court, arguing that the marketplace of ideas created by student fees is an appropriate and important part of the school's educational mission. On March 29, 1999, the U.S. Supreme Court granted certiorari because the 7th Circuit's decision conflicted with precedent established in other circuit courts.

On March 22, 2000, the U.S. Supreme Court unanimously overturned the 7th Circuit ruling that ruled mandatory student fees unconstitutional. Mandatory student fees currently fund a diverse array of activities ranging from lecture series to health services to the student newspaper. The Supreme Court's ruling provided a legal framework for a student fee system that engages students on issues ranging all over the political, social, and activist spectrum.

== Summary of the ruling ==
The Court held that the government can require public university students to pay a student activity fee even if the fee is used to support political and ideological speech by student groups whose beliefs are offensive to the student, as long as the program is viewpoint neutral.

The opinion of the Supreme Court, written by Justice Kennedy, made these key points:

- (1) The range of activities funded is appropriate to the mission of the university.
  - (a) "The speech the University seeks to encourage in the program before us is distinguished, not by discernible limits, but by its vast, unexplored bounds. To insist upon asking what speech is germane would be contrary to the very goal the University seeks to pursue. It is not for the Court to say what is or is not germane to the ideas to be pursued in an institution of higher learning."
- (2) Student organizations cannot be denied funding based on their viewpoint.
  - (a) "We conclude that the University of Wisconsin may sustain the extracurricular dimensions of its programs by using mandatory student fees with viewpoint neutrality as the operational principle."
- (3) Campuses that allocate mandatory fees to a wide variety of student groups are constitutionally allowable.
  - (a) "We decline to impose a system of that sort as a constitutional requirement, however. The restriction could be so disruptive and expensive that the program to support extracurricular speech would be ineffective."
- (4) Universities enjoy unique free-speech protections that are different and separate from labor unions and Bar associations because "the means of implementing First Amendment protections, adopted in those decisions, are neither applicable, nor workable in the context of extracurricular student speech at a university."
- (5) It makes no difference if the activities supported by the fee are conducted on or off campus.
  - (a) "We make no distinction between campus activities and the off-campus expressive activities of objectionable [student groups]. Universities, like all of society, are finding that traditional conceptions of territorial boundaries are difficult to insist upon in an age marked by revolutionary changes in communications, information transfer, and the means of discourse."

== "Viewpoint neutrality" and the First Amendment ==
When the Court states that funds must be allocated in a viewpoint-neutral manner, it means that funding decisions cannot be based on a particular group or activity's point of view. Thus, the decision to fund or not to fund an organization cannot be contingent on the content of the group's message. This method of allocating funds protects students' free speech rights by ensuring that all viewpoints, including those that are controversial, have an equal chance to receive student fee funding. However, the concept of viewpoint neutrality has been subject to misinterpretation:

- Viewpoint neutrality does not mean that all groups should receive the same amount of money. If this were true, then the chess club would receive the same amount of funding as the student newspaper, which would result in either excessively extravagant chess sets or a student paper unable to publish and distribute its work. Instead, all viewpoints receive the same opportunity to receive student funding.
- Viewpoint neutrality does not mean that by funding one point of view, the university must automatically fund an "opposite" point of view. First, most organizations and activities do not have an opposite point of view. Second, even in a situation where a pro-life group and a pro-choice group apply for funding, it is not necessary to fund both groups at the same level, or even to fund both at all. Chances are strong that one of the two groups provides a greater level of services to the student body, and thus, deserves more funding. However, the level of services provided and other objective criteria should direct the funding decision rather than the viewpoint of either group.

The Court makes "no distinction between the on and off-campus activities" of student organizations and states that "universities possess significant interests in encouraging students to take advantage of the social, civic, cultural, and religious opportunities available in surrounding communities and throughout the country."

== See also ==
- List of United States Supreme Court cases by the Rehnquist Court
- List of United States Supreme Court cases involving the First Amendment
