= Williams v. Taylor (Michael Williams) =

- Supreme Court of the United States

Argued February 28, 2000 Decided April 18, 2000
- Full case name: Michael Wayne Williams, Petitioner v. John Taylor, Warden
- Citations: 529 U.S. 420 (more) 120 S. Ct. 1479, 146 L.Ed.2d 435
- Argument: Oral argument

Case history
- Prior: Williams v. Taylor, 189 F.3d 421 (4th Cir. 1999).

Holding
- Under §2254(e)(2), as amended by AEDPA, a "fail[ure] to develop" a claim's factual basis in state-court proceedings is not established unless there is lack of diligence, or some greater fault, attributable to the prisoner or his counsel. The statute does not bar the evidentiary hearing petitioner seeks on his juror bias and prosecutorial misconduct claims, but bars a hearing on his Brady claim because he "failed to develop" that claim's factual basis in state court and concedes his inability to satisfy the statute's further stringent conditions for excusing the deficiency.

Court membership
- Chief Justice William Rehnquist Associate Justices John P. Stevens · Sandra Day O'Connor; Antonin Scalia · Anthony Kennedy; David Souter · Clarence Thomas; Ruth Bader Ginsburg · Stephen Breyer

Case opinion
- Majority: Kennedy, joined by unanimous

Laws applied
- Antiterrorism and Effective Death Penalty Act of 1996

Williams v. Taylor, 529 U.S. 420 (2000), was a United States Supreme Court case concerning the interpretation of a provision of the Antiterrorism and Effective Death Penalty Act of 1996 (AEDPA). The case was argued on February 28, 2000, and decided on April 18, 2000. In a unanimous opinion written by Justice Anthony Kennedy, the Supreme Court held that the provision at issue only bars evidentiary hearings by state prisoners in federal habeas proceedings if "there is lack of diligence, or some greater fault, attributable to the prisoner or his counsel". This case concerned a convicted murderer, Michael Wayne Williams, who was incarcerated at Sussex State Prison in Waverly, Virginia. It was decided on the same day as another case called Williams v. Taylor, which concerned Terry Williams, a different convicted murderer incarcerated at the same prison; both cases named the prison's warden at the time, John B. Taylor, as the respondent.
