= United States v. Playboy Entertainment Group, Inc. =

United States v. Playboy Entertainment Group
- Supreme Court of the United States

Argued November 30, 1999 Decided May 22, 2000
- Full case name: United States, et al. v. Playboy Entertainment Group, Inc.
- Citations: 529 U.S. 803 (more) 120 S. Ct. 1878; 146 L. Ed. 2d 865; 2000 U.S. LEXIS 3427
- Argument: Oral argument

Case history
- Prior: Preliminary injunction denied, Playboy Entm't Grp., Inc. v. United States, 945 F. Supp. 772 (D. Del. 1996); judgment for plaintiff, 30 F. Supp. 2d 702 (D. Del. 1998); probable jurisdiction noted, 527 U.S. 1021 (1999).

Holding
- The provision of the Communications Decency Act of 1996 (CDA) which requires cable television operators to scramble or block channels that are "primarily dedicated to sexually oriented programming" from 10:00 p.m. to 6:00 a.m. violates the First Amendment to the Constitution of the United States. Section 505 of the Telecommunications Act of 1996 (47 U.S.C. 561) is unconstitutional.

Court membership
- Chief Justice William Rehnquist Associate Justices John P. Stevens · Sandra Day O'Connor; Antonin Scalia · Anthony Kennedy; David Souter · Clarence Thomas; Ruth Bader Ginsburg · Stephen Breyer

Case opinions
- Majority: Kennedy, joined by Stevens, Souter, Thomas, Ginsburg
- Concurrence: Stevens
- Concurrence: Thomas
- Dissent: Scalia
- Dissent: Breyer, joined by Rehnquist, O'Connor, Scalia

United States v. Playboy Entertainment Group, 529 U.S. 803 (2000), is a United States Supreme Court case in which the Court struck down Section 505 of the Telecommunications Act of 1996, which required that cable television operators completely scramble or block channels that are "primarily dedicated to sexually-oriented programming" or limit their transmission to the hours of 10 pm to 6 am.

== Background ==
In order to shield children from hearing or seeing images resulting from signal bleed, the U.S. Congress enacted Section 505 of the Telecommunications Act of 1996 based on a handful of complaints. No congressional hearing was held.

Section 505 required cable television operators providing channels “primarily dedicated to sexually-oriented programs” either to completely scramble or otherwise block those channels, or to limit their transmission hours to when children were unlikely to view. Administrative regulations defined children as unlikely to view programming between 10 pm and 6 am.

Playboy Entertainment Group, Inc. challenged Section 505's constitutionality, claiming that the provision violated the First Amendment.

=== Procedural history ===
A three-judge panel of the United States District Court for the District of Delaware held that Section 505 was a content-based restriction on speech that was subject to strict scrutiny. In order to satisfy a strict scrutiny analysis, the Government was required to prove that it was “narrowly tailored to promote a compelling government interest.”

The Government offered three interests to justify Section 505: (1) protecting children from being exposed to sexually explicit material; (2) supporting parents' rights to raise their children as they see fit; and (3) ensuring an individual's right to privacy in the home.

The District Court agreed that the interests the statute advanced were compelling. Still, it concluded that it violated the First Amendment because the Government might further its interests through less restrictive alternatives. One less restrictive means is Section 504 of the Act, which requires a cable operator, upon the request of a subscriber, to fully scramble or otherwise block a channel that the subscriber does not wish to receive.

The United States appealed directly to the Supreme Court, seeking to have the judgment reversed.

A group of sexologists filed an amicus brief on behalf of Playboy arguing that there was no state interest in shielding minors from sexually explicit signal bleed. The brief's authors included Elizabeth Rice Allgeier, Vern L. Bullough, Milton Diamond, Harold I. Lief, John Money, and Ira L. Reiss.

== Opinion of the Court ==
Affirming the District Court, the Supreme Court held, in an opinion authored by Justice Anthony M. Kennedy, that Section 505 was a content-based restriction because the provision singled out not only particular programming but also particular programmers.

Moreover, although the Court accepted the Government's compelling interests, it nevertheless concluded that the provision violated the First Amendment's free speech clause because the Government failed to prove that Section 505 was the least restrictive means of preventing children from hearing or seeing images resulting from signal bleed. The Court stated that Section 504 presented such an alternative means of regulation.

The Government argued that Section 504 was less effective than the blocking and time-channeling provision of Section 505. However, the Court held that Section 504, combined with “market-based solutions such as programmable televisions, VCR's, and mapping systems” can eliminate signal bleed without restricting a cable operator's ability to transmit its programming to those who want to receive it.

The Court concluded that because of the existence of such alternatives, which could be equally effective at furthering the Government's interest, the overly restrictive Section 505 violated the First Amendment.

Justices Stevens, Souter, Thomas, and Ginsburg joined with Kennedy in the majority.

=== Concurrences ===
Stevens and Thomas filed concurring opinions. Stevens's concurrence specifically addressed Scalia's criticisms of the majority opinion. Stevens argued that Scalia defined obscenity too broadly and could include practices that were merely deceptive.

Thomas noted in his concurrence that he would have decided the case differently if the broadcasts were of obscene material. He posited that the government had merely argued that the broadcasts were indecent. First Amendment protections have more sway over merely indecent material than outright obscene material. Thus, the balancing of interests weighed in favor of upholding First Amendment protection.

=== Dissents ===
Justice Stephen G. Breyer authored a dissent, arguing that the majority of the court had not made a "realistic assessment of the alternatives." Breyer was joined in his dissent by Justices Rehnquist, O'Connor, and Scalia.

Justice Scalia also authored his own dissent arguing that Section 505 is constitutional because it regulates the business of obscenity.

== See also ==
- AMC Networks#Rainbow Media
