= Jones v. United States (2000) =

- Supreme Court of the United States

Decided May 22, 2000
- Full case name: Dewey Jones v. United States
- Citations: 529 U.S. 848 (more)

Holding
- Because an owner-occupied residence not used for any commercial purpose does not qualify as property "used in" commerce or commerce-affecting activity, arson of such a dwelling is not subject to federal prosecution under the Organized Crime Control Act of 1970.

Court membership
- Chief Justice William Rehnquist Associate Justices John P. Stevens · Sandra Day O'Connor; Antonin Scalia · Anthony Kennedy; David Souter · Clarence Thomas; Ruth Bader Ginsburg · Stephen Breyer

Case opinions
- Majority: GINSBURG
- Concurrence: STEVENS, joined by THOMAS
- Concurrence: THOMAS, joined by SCALIA

Laws applied
- Organized Crime Control Act of 1970

Jones v. United States, 529 U.S. 848 (2000), was a United States Supreme Court case in which the court held that because an owner-occupied residence not used for any commercial purpose does not qualify as property "used in" commerce or commerce-affecting activity, arson of such a dwelling is not subject to federal prosecution under the Organized Crime Control Act of 1970.

== Background ==
Jones tossed a Molotov cocktail into a home owned and occupied by his cousin as a dwelling place for everyday family living. The ensuing fire severely damaged the home. Jones was convicted in the federal District Court of violating, among other things, 18 U.S.C. § 844(i), part of the Organized Crime Control Act of 1970. §844(i) makes it a federal crime to "maliciously damag[e] or destro[y], ... by means of fire or an explosive, any building ... used in interstate or foreign commerce or in any activity affecting interstate or foreign commerce." The Seventh Circuit Court of Appeals affirmed, rejecting Jones's contention that §844(i), when applied to the arson of a private residence, exceeds the authority vested in Congress under the Commerce Clause.

The Supreme Court granted certiorari.

== Opinion of the court ==
The Supreme Court issued an opinion on May 22, 2000.
