= United States v. Johnson (2000) =

- Supreme Court of the United States

Argued December 8, 1999 Decided March 1, 2000
- Full case name: United States v. Roy Lee Johnson
- Citations: 529 U.S. 53 (more) 120 S. Ct. 1114; 146 L. Ed. 2d 39; 2000 U.S. LEXIS 1735; 68 U.S.L.W. 4174; 2000 Cal. Daily Op. Service 1612; 2000 Daily Journal DAR 2217; 2000 Colo. J. C.A.R. 1079; 13 Fla. L. Weekly Fed. S 131

Court membership
- Chief Justice William Rehnquist Associate Justices John P. Stevens · Sandra Day O'Connor; Antonin Scalia · Anthony Kennedy; David Souter · Clarence Thomas; Ruth Bader Ginsburg · Stephen Breyer

Case opinion
- Majority: Kennedy, joined by unanimous

United States v. Johnson, 529 U.S. 53 (2000), was a United States Supreme Court case.

Johnson was sentenced in federal court for multiple violations of federal criminal provisions. He was sentenced terms of imprisonment for the violations and, in addition, a three-year mandatory term of supervised release for the drug possession offenses. After he had served 2½ years in federal prison, two of his convictions, not including the drug possession convictions, were declared invalid; as a result, he had served too much prison time, which resulted in his being eligible for immediate release.

He argued that his time in federal prison should be credited against his three years of supervised release. The District Court denied relief, and explained that (1) pursuant to 18 USCS 3624(e), the supervised release commenced upon the accused's actual release from incarceration, not before, and (2) granting the accused credit would undermine the United States Congress's aim of using supervised release to assist convicted felons in their transitions to community life. However, the United States Court of Appeals for the Sixth Circuit (1) accepted the accused's argument that his term of supervised release commenced when his lawful term of imprisonment expired, and (2) reversed the decision of the District Court (154 F3d 569).

== Opinion of the court ==
A unanimous U.S. Supreme Court, per Justice Kennedy, reversed the original decision. Relying heavily upon the actual language in 18 U.S.C. § 3624(e), the Court found that a period of supervised release cannot commence until the prisoner is actually released from incarceration. The Court construed the supervised release statute to unambiguously dictate the commencement of supervision upon release from custody. The Supreme Court found no need to resort to other subsections of the statute because:

1) the statute was unambiguous: a supervised release term did not commence until an accused was "released from imprisonment," and the ordinary and commonsense meaning of "release" was to be freed from confinement; 3624(e) also provided that (a) a term of supervised release came after imprisonment, once the prisoner was released by the Bureau of Prisons to the supervision of a probation officer, and (b) supervised release did not run while an individual remained in the custody of the Bureau.

2) the same terminology was not used in the different subsections;

3) there was no express reference between the relevant statutory subsections.

Congress intended supervised release conditions to assist individuals in their transition to community life. Supervised release serves a rehabilitative end distinct from those served by incarceration. Id. at 59.

When Congress provides exceptions in a statute, it does not follow that courts have authority to create others. The proper inference... is that Congress considered the issue of exceptions and, in the end, limited the statute to the ones set forth. Id. at 58.

However, Justice Kennedy noted that the inmate could seek equitable relief in the district court pursuant to 18 U.S.C. § 3583(e)(2) (modification of conditions of supervised release) or 18 U.S.C. § 3583(e)(1) (trial court may terminate supervised release after expiration of one year if warranted by the defendant's conduct).
