= Johnson v. United States (2000) =

- Supreme Court of the United States

Argued February 22, 2000 Decided May 15, 2000
- Full case name: Cornell Johnson v. United States
- Citations: 529 U.S. 694 (more) 120 S. Ct. 1795; 146 L. Ed. 2d 727; 2000 U.S. LEXIS 3135; 68 U.S.L.W. 4378; 2000 Cal. Daily Op. Service 3775; 2000 Daily Journal DAR 5043; 2000 Colo. J. C.A.R. 2679; 13 Fla. L. Weekly Fed. S 308

Court membership
- Chief Justice William Rehnquist Associate Justices John P. Stevens · Sandra Day O'Connor; Antonin Scalia · Anthony Kennedy; David Souter · Clarence Thomas; Ruth Bader Ginsburg · Stephen Breyer

Case opinions
- Majority: Souter, joined by Rehnquist, Stevens, O'Connor, Ginsburg, Breyer; Kennedy (in part)
- Concurrence: Kennedy (in part)
- Concurrence: Thomas
- Dissent: Scalia

Johnson v. United States, 529 U.S. 694 (2000), was a United States Supreme Court case in which the rights of those serving federal probation and supervised release were more clearly defined. The court ruled that "Although such violations often lead to reimprisonment, the violative conduct need not be criminal and need only be found by a judge under a preponderance of the evidence standard, not by a jury beyond a reasonable doubt."

An earlier case of the same name, 333 U.S. 10 (1948), held that a search warrant is always required unless there are exceptional circumstances.
