= Wal-Mart Stores, Inc. v. Samara Brothers, Inc. =

- Supreme Court of the United States

Decided March 22, 2000
- Full case name: Wal-Mart Stores, Inc. v. Samara Brothers, Inc.
- Citations: 529 U.S. 205 (more)

Holding
- Product design is not inherently distinctive trade dress.

Court membership
- Chief Justice William Rehnquist Associate Justices John P. Stevens · Sandra Day O'Connor; Antonin Scalia · Anthony Kennedy; David Souter · Clarence Thomas; Ruth Bader Ginsburg · Stephen Breyer

Case opinion
- Majority: Scalia, joined by unanimous

Wal-Mart Stores, Inc. v. Samara Brothers, Inc., 529 U.S. 205 (2000), was a United States Supreme Court case in which the court held that product design is not inherently distinctive trade dress.

== See also ==
- Two Pesos, Inc. v. Taco Cabana, Inc.
