= Williams v. Taylor (Terry Williams) =

- Supreme Court of the United States

Argued October 4, 1999 Decided April 18, 2000
- Full case name: Terry Williams, Petitioner v. John Taylor, Warden
- Citations: 529 U.S. 362 (more) 146 L. Ed. 2d 389, 120 S. Ct. 1495
- Argument: Oral argument

Case history
- Prior: 163 F.3d 860 (4th Cir. 1998)

Holding
- The judgment is reversed, and the case is remanded.

Court membership
- Chief Justice William Rehnquist Associate Justices John P. Stevens · Sandra Day O'Connor; Antonin Scalia · Anthony Kennedy; David Souter · Clarence Thomas; Ruth Bader Ginsburg · Stephen Breyer

Case opinions
- Majority: Stevens (parts I, III, and IV), joined by O'Connor, Kennedy, Souter, Ginsburg, Breyer
- Majority: O'Connor, joined by Rehnquist, Kennedy, Thomas; Scalia (except for the footnote)
- Plurality: Stevens (parts II and V), joined by Souter, Ginsburg, Breyer
- Concurrence: O'Connor (in part and in judgment), joined by Kennedy
- Concur/dissent: Rehnquist, joined by Scalia, Thomas

Williams v. Taylor, 529 U.S. 362 (2000), was a United States Supreme Court case decided on April 18, 2000. It concerned a federal habeas corpus petition brought by convicted murderer Terry Williams, who alleged that he had received ineffective assistance of counsel in violation of the Supreme Court's prior decision in Strickland v. Washington. The Supreme Court's decision in this case was split across two majority opinions, one authored by John Paul Stevens and joined by five other justices, and the other authored by Sandra Day O'Connor and joined by four other justices.

== Background ==
On November 3, 1985, Terry Williams robbed and murdered Harris Stone at his home in Danville, Virginia. He was later convicted of robbery and capital murder by a jury in September 1986, and after his subsequent sentencing hearing, the trial judge sentenced him to death. The Virginia Supreme Court affirmed his conviction and sentence in a 1987 decision. In 1988, Williams filed a collateral attack on his sentence in Danville Circuit Court. The same judge who oversaw Williams' trial and sentencing hearing held evidentiary hearings for two days. The judge subsequently concluded that Williams' conviction was valid, but that he had received ineffective assistance of counsel during sentencing because his lawyers had failed to adequately investigate and present mitigating evidence. The judge therefore recommended that Williams receive a new sentencing hearing, but the Virginia Supreme Court declined this recommendation, arguing that even if Williams had received ineffective assistance of counsel, he had not suffered sufficient prejudice to warrant relief.

Williams then filed a habeas petition in federal court, and the federal judge concluded that Williams' death sentence was constitutionally invalid due to the ineffective assistance of counsel identified by his original trial judge. This federal judge also concluded that the Virginia Supreme Court's prior denial of state habeas relief to Williams "was contrary to, or involved an unreasonable application of, clearly established Federal law", and thus grounds for federal habeas relief under 28 U.S.C. §2254(d)(1), a provision of the Antiterrorism and Effective Death Penalty Act of 1996 (AEDPA). On appeal, the United States Court of Appeals for the Fourth Circuit reversed this ruling, holding that §2254(d)(1) bars federal habeas courts from granting relief to state prisoners unless the state court that previously adjudicated their claim "decided the question by interpreting or applying the relevant precedent in a manner that reasonable jurists would all agree is unreasonable".

== Supreme Court ==
The Supreme Court faced two questions in this case: whether Williams had indeed received ineffective assistance of counsel, thereby violating his constitutional rights under the Sixth Amendment, and whether the Virginia Supreme Court's decision to uphold his sentence "was contrary to, or involved an unreasonable application of, clearly established Federal law, as determined by the Supreme Court of the United States", one of the two circumstances in which AEDPA permits federal habeas courts to grant relief to state prisoners. Ultimately, it answered both questions in the affirmative. The case is significant for its interpretation of AEDPA's "unreasonable application" clause:

For purposes of today's opinion, the most important point is that an unreasonable application of federal law is different from an incorrect application of federal law . . . . Under § 2254(d)(1)'s "unreasonable application" clause, then, a federal habeas court may not issue the writ simply because that court concludes in its independent judgment that the relevant state-court decision applied clearly established federal law erroneously or incorrectly.

The provision required greater deference to state-court decisions than had been required under Wright v. West (1992), which had held that federal habeas courts need not defer to state-court decisions on mixed questions involving the application of federal law to the facts.
