= Geier v. American Honda Motor Co. =

Geier v. American Honda Motor Company
- Supreme Court of the United States

Argued December 7, 1999 Decided May 22, 2000
- Full case name: Alexis Geier, et al., petitioners v. American Honda Motor Company, Inc., et al.
- Citations: 529 U.S. 861 (more) 120 S. Ct. 1913; 146 L. Ed. 2d 914; 2000 U.S. LEXIS 3425; 68 U.S.L.W. 4425; CCH Prod. Liab. Rep. ¶ 15,795; 2000 Cal. Daily Op. Service 5277; 2000 Daily Journal DAR 5277; 2000 Colo. J. C.A.R. 2826; 13 Fla. L. Weekly Fed. S 344

Case history
- Prior: Dismissed, (D.D.C. 1997); affirmed, 166 F.3d 1236 (D.C. Cir. 1999); cert. granted, 527 U.S. 1063 (1999).

Holding
- The Federal standards for motor vehicle pre-empts tort lawsuits made under stricter state legislations.

Court membership
- Chief Justice William Rehnquist Associate Justices John P. Stevens · Sandra Day O'Connor; Antonin Scalia · Anthony Kennedy; David Souter · Clarence Thomas; Ruth Bader Ginsburg · Stephen Breyer

Case opinions
- Majority: Breyer, joined by Rehnquist, O'Connor, Scalia, and Kennedy
- Dissent: Stevens, joined by Souter, Thomas, Ginsburg

Laws applied
- National Traffic and Motor Vehicle Safety Act

Geier v. American Honda Motor Company, 529 U.S. 861 (2000), was a United States Supreme Court case in which the Court held that a federal automobile safety standard pre-empted a stricter state rule. The Court held that Alexis Geier, who suffered severe injuries in a 1987 Honda Accord, could not sue Honda for failing to install a driver-side airbag – a requirement under District of Columbia tort law but not Federal law – because Federal law pre-empted the District's rule.

== Background ==
Alexis Geier suffered severe injuries in a 1987 Honda Accord that did not possess a driver's side airbag. Geier and her family sought damages under the District of Columbia tort law "claiming that American Honda Motor Company was negligent in not equipping the Accord with a driver's side airbag." The District Court ruled in favor of Honda finding that "Geier's claims were expressly pre-empted by the Act." and created a conflict because the safety features of the 1987 Honda Accord were in compliance with Federal Vehicle Safety Standard (FMVSS) 208, under the National Traffic and Motor Vehicle Safety Act of 1966. The United States Court of Appeals for the District of Columbia Circuit affirmed.

== Decision of the Supreme Court ==
Justice Stephen G. Breyer delivered the Court's 5–4 decision, which held: "[Geier's] 'no airbag' lawsuit conflicts with the objectives of FMVSS 208 and is therefore pre-empted by the Act." The dissent challenged the majority's "unprecedented use of inferences from regulatory history and commentary as a basis for implied pre-emption."

== See also ==
- Honda Motor Company v. Oberg
- List of United States Supreme Court cases, volume 529
