= Lists of United States Supreme Court cases =

The United States Supreme Court is the highest federal court of the United States.

== By chief justice ==
Court historians and other legal scholars consider each chief justice who presides over the Supreme Court of the United States to be the head of an era of the Court.

These lists are sorted chronologically by chief justice and include most major cases decided by the court. The first three Courts (those of Jay, Rutledge, and Ellsworth) that precede the Marshall Court are grouped together, since their individual terms were relatively short and decisions few in number, while the Supreme Court was still finding its footing.

- Jay, Rutledge, and Ellsworth Courts (prior to the Marshall Court) (October 19, 1789 – December 15, 1800)
- Marshall Court (February 4, 1801 – July 6, 1835)
- Taney Court (March 28, 1836 – October 12, 1864)
- Chase Court (December 15, 1864 – May 7, 1873)
- Waite Court (March 4, 1874 – March 23, 1888)
- Fuller Court (October 8, 1888 – July 4, 1910)
- White Court (December 19, 1910 – May 19, 1921)
- Taft Court (July 11, 1921 – February 3, 1930)
- Hughes Court (February 24, 1930 – June 30, 1941)
- Stone Court (July 3, 1941 – April 22, 1946)
- Vinson Court (June 24, 1946 – September 8, 1953)
- Warren Court (October 5, 1953 – June 23, 1969)
- Burger Court (June 23, 1969 – September 26, 1986)
- Rehnquist Court (September 26, 1986 – September 3, 2005)
- Roberts Court (September 29, 2005 – present)

== By volume ==
Decisions of the Supreme Court of the United States are officially published in the United States Reports.

- Lists of United States Supreme Court cases by volume

== By term ==
These lists contain detailed tables about each term since 1999, including which justices filed the court's opinion, dissenting and concurring opinions in each case, and information about justices joining opinions. The tables conclude with term statistics and concordance data.

- 1999 term opinions
- 2000 term opinions
- 2001 term opinions
- 2002 term opinions
- 2003 term opinions
- 2004 term opinions
- 2005 term opinions
- 2006 term opinions
- 2007 term opinions
- 2008 term opinions
- 2009 term opinions
- 2010 term opinions
- 2011 term opinions
- 2012 term opinions
- 2013 term opinions
- 2014 term opinions
- 2015 term opinions
- 2016 term opinions
- 2017 term opinions
- 2018 term opinions
- 2019 term opinions
- 2020 term opinions
- 2021 term opinions
- 2022 term opinions
- 2023 term opinions
- 2024 term opinions
- 2025 term opinions
- 2026 term opinions

== By subject matter ==
- Arbitration
- Capital punishment
- Copyright
- First Amendment
- Immigration
- Jehovah's Witnesses
- Legal standing
- LGBTQ rights
- Mental health
- Native American tribes
- Patents
- Taxation and revenue
- Trademarks

== Other lists ==
- List of pending United States Supreme Court cases
- List of landmark court decisions in the United States (most frequently from the Supreme Court)

== See also ==
- List of significant shadow docket decisions made by the United States Supreme Court
- List of United States courts of appeals cases
- List of United States state supreme court cases
- List of sources of law in the United States
