= 1916 United States presidential election in Wisconsin =

- November 7, 1916
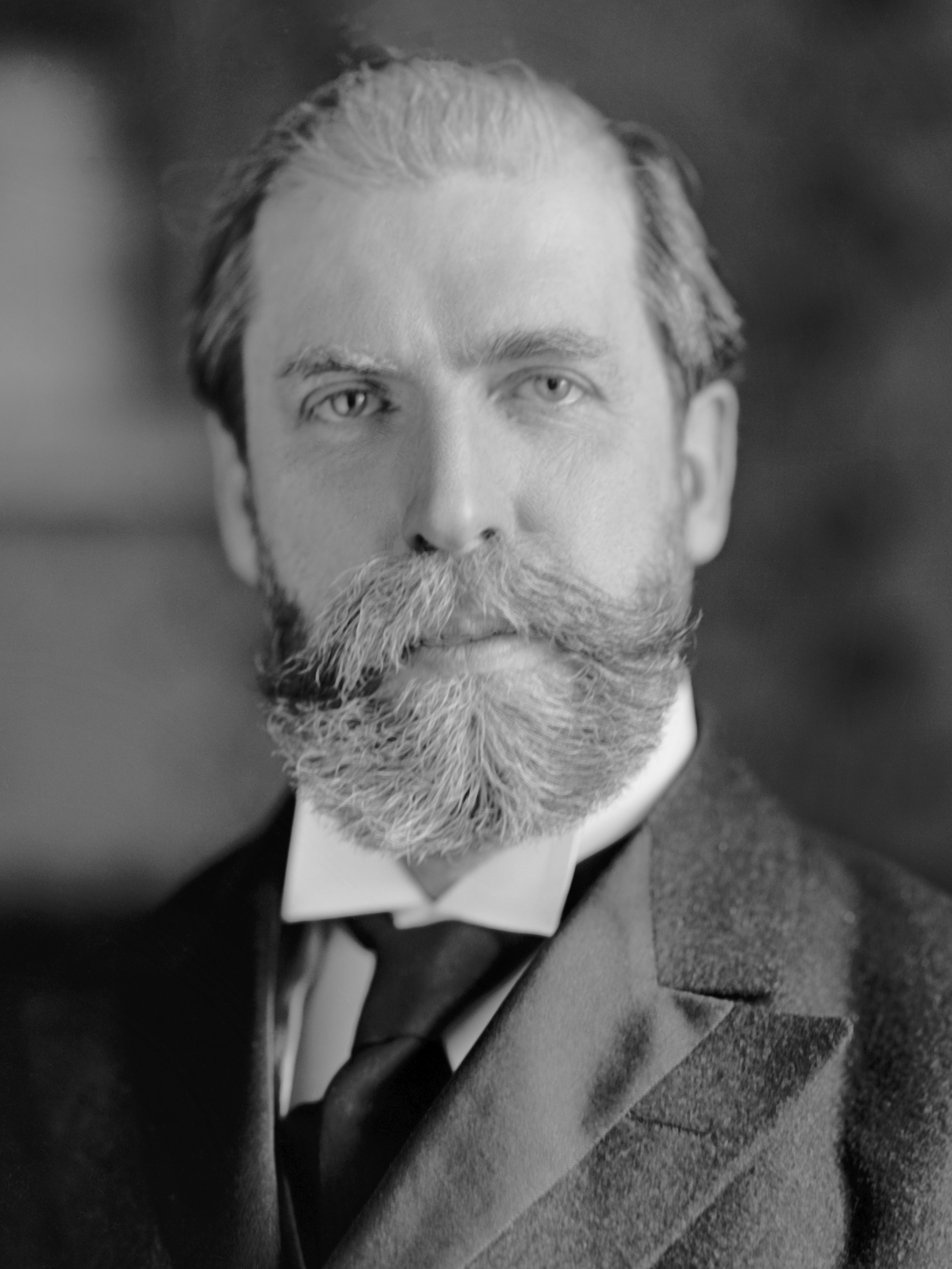

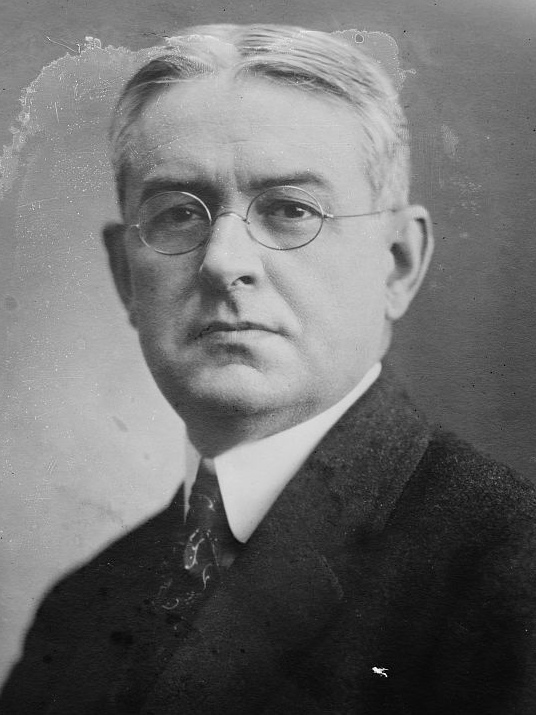
Nominee	Charles Evans Hughes	Woodrow Wilson	Allan L. Benson
Party	Republican	Democratic	Social-Democratic
Home state	New York	New Jersey	New York
Running mate	Charles W. Fairbanks	Thomas R. Marshall	George Ross Kirkpatrick
Electoral vote	13	0
Popular vote	221,323	193,042	27,846
Percentage	49.25%	42.96%	6.20%
County results
Hughes
40–50%
50–60%
60–70%
Wilson
40–50%
50–60%
60–70%
President before election
Woodrow Wilson
Democratic
Elected President
Woodrow Wilson
Democratic

The 1916 United States presidential election in Wisconsin was held on November 7, 1916 as part of the 1916 United States presidential election. State voters chose 13 electors to the Electoral College, who voted for president and vice president.

Ever since the decline of the Populist movement, Wisconsin had become almost a one-party state dominated by the Republican Party. The Democratic Party became entirely uncompetitive outside certain German Catholic counties adjoining Lake Michigan as the upper classes, along with the majority of workers who followed them, completely fled from William Jennings Bryan's agrarian and free silver sympathies. As Democratic strength weakened severely after 1894 – although the state did develop a strong Social-Democratic Party to provide opposition to the GOP – Wisconsin developed the direct Republican primary in 1903 and this ultimately created competition between the "League" under Robert M. La Follette, and the conservative "Regular" faction.

At the turn of the decade, the Democratic Party underwent a brief revival, as it made significant gains upon its small share of state legislative seats and many people in the state saw in New Jersey Governor Woodrow Wilson the possibility of the party returning to the ideals it was felt to have deserted with Bryan fifteen years beforehand. Wilson would carry Wisconsin in 1912 and in fact improve upon Bryan's share of the vote from 1908.

During his term, however, Wisconsin's heavily German-American population turned against Wilson, with the result that in 1914 the Democrats lost ground in the state legislature, and with the outbreak of war in Europe this opposition increased, because the concurrent Irish rebellion was believed to lie in the interests of the Central Powers, and Wilson was viewed as strongly pro-British. The position of President Wilson as strongly pro-British was intensified when he failed to accept clemency for Roger Casement.

Republican nominee Charles Evans Hughes campaigned in the state during September, but President Wilson did not campaign in the state, although it was viewed as doubtful in September despite strong feelings that German-American opposition would eliminate Wilson's chance. Near the end of October, a Tennessean polls suggested that Wilson would carry the state due to his anti-war sentiment, but the Los Angeles Times said Hughes would carry the state by a "moderate margin" despite a straw poll in favour of Wilson. The Oshkosh Northwestern on October 26 viewed the state as "doubtful", but said their polls indicated Hughes would win by around fifteen thousand votes.

== Results ==
General election results (Note: The 1917 Blue Book gives the totals as Hughes 220,822; Wilson 191,363; Benson 27,631; Hanly 7,318; and no Scattering. Based on the Board of Canvassers report, these numbers are simply incorrect. No elector on any ticket received those numbers of votes. Indeed, the Blue Book is an unreliable source for Wisconsin election data from about 1890 to 1920 and its figures frequently differ from the figures listed in the Board of Canvassers reports. The 1917 Blue Book also excludes the soldier vote for the presidential election (although it includes it for the state election). The soldier vote was recorded by county, separate from the regular home vote.)
Party	Pledged to	Elector	Votes
Republican Party	Charles Evans Hughes	L. K. Baker	221,323
Republican Party	Charles Evans Hughes	William W. Storms	221,215
Republican Party	Charles Evans Hughes	Frank Smith	221,181
Republican Party	Charles Evans Hughes	Walter J. Kohler	221,026
Republican Party	Charles Evans Hughes	Fred C. Pritzlaff	221,011
Republican Party	Charles Evans Hughes	O. G. Munson	220,979
Republican Party	Charles Evans Hughes	L. M. Alexander	220,968
Republican Party	Charles Evans Hughes	H. D. Lauson	220,952
Republican Party	Charles Evans Hughes	G. A. Walter Jr.	220,923
Republican Party	Charles Evans Hughes	John S. Medary	220,897
Republican Party	Charles Evans Hughes	O. K. Hawley	220,866
Republican Party	Charles Evans Hughes	A. H. Stange	220,866
Republican Party	Charles Evans Hughes	James T. Drought	220,857
Democratic Party	Woodrow Wilson	John C. Karel	193,042
Democratic Party	Woodrow Wilson	Charles W. Wiesse	191,857
Democratic Party	Woodrow Wilson	J. E. Dodge	191,834
Democratic Party	Woodrow Wilson	Vincent J. Schoenecker	191,692
Democratic Party	Woodrow Wilson	W. J. Kershaw	191,665
Democratic Party	Woodrow Wilson	Aldro Jenks	191,562
Democratic Party	Woodrow Wilson	Andrew R. McDonald	191,548
Democratic Party	Woodrow Wilson	Henry Moehlenpah	191,491
Democratic Party	Woodrow Wilson	John R. Matthews	191,488
Democratic Party	Woodrow Wilson	L. J. Pasternecki	191,483
Democratic Party	Woodrow Wilson	Otto C. Wernecke	191,469
Democratic Party	Woodrow Wilson	J. H. Cernahan	191,450
Democratic Party	Woodrow Wilson	J. A. Hobe	191,245
Social-Democratic Party	Allan L. Benson	A. J. Melms	27,846
Social-Democratic Party	Allan L. Benson	Oscar Ameringer	27,802
Social-Democratic Party	Allan L. Benson	Edward Ziegler	27,739
Social-Democratic Party	Allan L. Benson	James Vint	27,703
Social-Democratic Party	Allan L. Benson	Charles H. Olson	27,692
Social-Democratic Party	Allan L. Benson	John Doerfler Sr.	27,678
Social-Democratic Party	Allan L. Benson	John Chilson	27,665
Social-Democratic Party	Allan L. Benson	Edward D. Deuss	27,656
Social-Democratic Party	Allan L. Benson	Robert Schuttler	27,656
Social-Democratic Party	Allan L. Benson	Curtis A. Boorman	27,637
Social-Democratic Party	Allan L. Benson	G. M. Schmitz	27,631
Social-Democratic Party	Allan L. Benson	D. V. Lawell	27,621
Social-Democratic Party	Allan L. Benson	Otto F. Eick	27,600
Prohibition Party	Frank Hanly	Anthony J. Benjamin	7,166
Prohibition Party	Frank Hanly	Frank R. Derrick	7,130
Prohibition Party	Frank Hanly	Charles Schlafer	7,117
Prohibition Party	Frank Hanly	Louis M. Sagen	7,110
Prohibition Party	Frank Hanly	Jasper Dexter	7,108
Prohibition Party	Frank Hanly	Herbert S. Siggelko	7,104
Prohibition Party	Frank Hanly	Almon I. Collins	7,096
Prohibition Party	Frank Hanly	Pliny F. Meyers	7,093
Prohibition Party	Frank Hanly	William R. Nethercut	7,084
Prohibition Party	Frank Hanly	Oliver Needham	7,076
Prohibition Party	Frank Hanly	Charles E. Badger	7,068
Prohibition Party	Frank Hanly	David W. Emerson	7,047
Prohibition Party	Frank Hanly	Waldemar Ager	7,025
Write-in		Scattering	25
Votes cast (Note: Based on totals for highest elector on each ticket)			449,402

=== Results by county ===
County	Charles Evans Hughes Republican		Woodrow Wilson Democratic		Allan L. Benson Social-Democratic		Frank Hanly Prohibition		Margin		Total votes cast (Note: Based on highest elector on each ticket) (Note: Includes the separately reported soldier vote)
County	#	%	#	%	#	%	#	%	#	%	Total votes cast
Adams	957	51.15%	824	44.04%	48	2.57%	42	2.24%	133	7.11%	1,871
Ashland	2,017	51.94%	1,599	41.18%	189	4.87%	78	2.01%	418	10.76%	3,883
Barron	2,772	54.91%	1,890	37.44%	136	2.69%	250	4.95%	882	17.47%	5,048
Bayfield	1,321	51.12%	997	38.58%	225	8.71%	41	1.59%	324	12.54%	2,584
Brown	4,132	40.01%	5,771	55.88%	223	2.16%	201	1.95%	-1,639	-15.87%	10,327
Buffalo	1,492	56.56%	1,044	39.58%	63	2.39%	39	1.48%	448	16.98%	2,638
Burnett	1,007	53.97%	638	34.19%	169	9.06%	52	2.79%	369	19.77%	1,866
Calumet	1,981	57.20%	1,384	39.97%	74	2.14%	24	0.69%	597	17.24%	3,463
Chippewa	3,327	58.15%	2,234	39.05%	72	1.26%	88	1.54%	1,093	19.11%	5,721
Clark	3,413	64.95%	1,629	31.00%	129	2.45%	84	1.60%	1,784	33.95%	5,255
Columbia	3,432	57.66%	2,314	38.88%	80	1.34%	126	2.12%	1,118	18.78%	5,952
Crawford	1,883	50.66%	1,764	47.46%	32	0.86%	38	1.02%	119	3.20%	3,717
Dane	6,947	40.04%	9,923	57.19%	190	1.10%	291	1.68%	-2,976	-17.15%	17,351
Dodge	4,916	50.73%	4,535	46.80%	111	1.15%	128	1.32%	381	3.93%	9,690
Door	1,656	56.27%	1,204	40.91%	38	1.29%	45	1.53%	452	15.36%	2,943
Douglas	3,060	43.82%	2,971	42.55%	798	11.43%	154	2.21%	89	1.27%	6,983
Dunn	2,589	60.20%	1,457	33.88%	172	4.00%	83	1.93%	1,132	26.32%	4,301
Eau Claire	2,961	53.19%	2,302	41.35%	187	3.36%	117	2.10%	659	11.84%	5,567
Florence	412	69.36%	162	27.27%	9	1.52%	11	1.85%	250	42.09%	594
Fond du Lac	5,820	51.86%	5,118	45.61%	130	1.16%	154	1.37%	702	6.26%	11,222
Forest	739	52.15%	638	45.02%	18	1.27%	22	1.55%	101	7.13%	1,417
Grant	4,720	56.30%	3,460	41.27%	70	0.84%	133	1.59%	1,260	15.03%	8,383
Green	2,446	55.84%	1,699	38.79%	65	1.48%	170	3.88%	747	17.05%	4,380
Green Lake	1,650	53.07%	1,353	43.52%	34	1.09%	47	1.51%	297	9.55%	3,109 (Note: Includes 25 Scattering votes)
Iowa	2,271	48.79%	2,230	47.91%	19	0.41%	135	2.90%	41	0.88%	4,655
Iron	672	54.63%	475	38.62%	43	3.50%	40	3.25%	197	16.02%	1,230
Jackson	1,866	64.10%	966	33.18%	50	1.72%	29	1.00%	900	30.92%	2,911
Jefferson	3,809	49.54%	3,676	47.81%	84	1.09%	120	1.56%	133	1.73%	7,689
Juneau	2,335	58.99%	1,449	36.61%	109	2.75%	65	1.64%	886	22.39%	3,958
Kenosha	3,537	50.99%	2,817	40.61%	497	7.16%	86	1.24%	720	10.38%	6,937
Kewaunee	1,104	35.04%	2,011	63.82%	20	0.63%	16	0.51%	-907	-28.78%	3,151
La Crosse	3,659	44.57%	4,160	50.68%	281	3.42%	109	1.33%	-501	-6.10%	8,209
Lafayette	2,545	54.09%	2,059	43.76%	18	0.38%	83	1.76%	486	10.33%	4,705
Langlade	1,540	45.10%	1,757	51.45%	81	2.37%	37	1.08%	-217	-6.35%	3,415
Lincoln	2,191	60.74%	1,282	35.54%	98	2.72%	36	1.00%	909	25.20%	3,607
Manitowoc	4,236	46.43%	4,364	47.84%	453	4.97%	70	0.77%	-128	-1.40%	9,123
Marathon	5,868	57.13%	3,702	36.04%	607	5.91%	95	0.92%	2,166	21.09%	10,272
Marinette	2,807	53.40%	2,212	42.08%	146	2.78%	92	1.75%	595	11.32%	5,257
Marquette	1,385	58.86%	924	39.27%	15	0.64%	29	1.23%	461	19.59%	2,353
Milwaukee	27,957	34.73%	35,041	43.53%	17,076	21.21%	427	0.53%	-7,084	-8.80%	80,501
Monroe	3,068	57.81%	2,012	37.91%	121	2.28%	106	2.00%	1,056	19.90%	5,307
Oconto	2,614	56.45%	1,907	41.18%	70	1.51%	40	0.86%	707	15.27%	4,631
Oneida	1,103	45.02%	1,085	44.29%	249	10.16%	13	0.53%	18	0.73%	2,450
Outagamie	5,346	52.84%	4,505	44.52%	166	1.64%	101	1.00%	841	8.31%	10,118
Ozaukee	1,610	49.39%	1,579	48.44%	51	1.56%	20	0.61%	31	0.95%	3,260
Pepin	766	53.19%	623	43.26%	25	1.74%	26	1.81%	143	9.93%	1,440
Pierce	1,946	51.88%	1,652	44.04%	72	1.92%	81	2.16%	294	7.84%	3,751
Polk	2,080	51.19%	1,714	42.19%	195	4.80%	74	1.82%	366	9.01%	4,063
Portage	2,523	44.54%	3,001	52.98%	71	1.25%	69	1.22%	-478	-8.44%	5,664
Price	1,621	56.36%	1,051	36.54%	147	5.11%	57	1.98%	570	19.82%	2,876
Racine (Note: The 1917 Blue Book has a critical mistake in this county: it swaps the votes for Wilson and Hughes. However, the original report by the Board of Canvassers clearly shows the Democratic ticket receiving more votes than the Republican ticket. Thus, it was actually Wilson who won Racine County in 1916 and not Hughes.)	4,496	42.26%	5,083	47.78%	605	5.69%	455	4.28%	-587	-5.52%	10,639
Richland	2,053	48.55%	1,848	43.70%	89	2.10%	239	5.65%	205	4.85%	4,229
Rock	7,042	61.11%	4,032	34.99%	223	1.94%	227	1.97%	3,010	26.12%	11,524
Rusk	989	47.62%	926	44.58%	114	5.49%	48	2.31%	63	3.03%	2,077
Sauk	3,786	59.53%	2,276	35.79%	43	0.68%	255	4.01%	1,510	23.74%	6,360
Sawyer	551	46.62%	562	47.55%	51	4.31%	18	1.52%	-11	-0.93%	1,182
Shawano	3,417	68.72%	1,368	27.51%	130	2.61%	57	1.15%	2,049	41.21%	4,972
Sheboygan	5,573	52.89%	3,903	37.04%	976	9.26%	85	0.81%	1,670	15.85%	10,537
St. Croix	2,739	50.99%	2,373	44.17%	176	3.28%	84	1.56%	366	6.81%	5,372
Taylor	1,544	60.17%	846	32.97%	136	5.30%	40	1.56%	698	27.20%	2,566
Trempealeau	2,139	56.05%	1,578	41.35%	29	0.76%	70	1.83%	561	14.70%	3,816
Vernon	2,928	58.64%	1,839	36.83%	49	0.98%	177	3.54%	1,089	21.81%	4,993
Vilas	531	48.49%	467	42.65%	81	7.40%	16	1.46%	64	5.84%	1,095
Walworth	4,004	59.60%	2,458	36.59%	57	0.85%	199	2.96%	1,546	23.01%	6,718
Washburn	938	55.31%	647	38.15%	77	4.54%	34	2.00%	291	17.16%	1,696
Washington	2,896	50.31%	2,736	47.53%	75	1.30%	49	0.85%	160	2.78%	5,756
Waukesha	3,778	45.15%	4,219	50.42%	146	1.74%	225	2.69%	-441	-5.27%	8,368
Waupaca	4,493	69.85%	1,721	26.76%	98	1.52%	120	1.87%	2,772	43.10%	6,432
Waushara	2,345	67.31%	1,015	29.13%	78	2.24%	46	1.32%	1,330	38.17%	3,484
Winnebago	5,993	50.51%	5,328	44.90%	383	3.23%	162	1.37%	665	5.60%	11,866
Wood	2,979	50.30%	2,653	44.80%	204	3.44%	86	1.45%	326	5.50%	5,922
Total	221,323	49.25%	193,042	42.96%	27,846	6.20%	7,166	1.59%	28,281	6.29%	449,402

==== Counties that flipped from Democratic to Republican ====
- Ashland
- Calumet
- Chippewa
- Columbia
- Crawford
- Dodge
- Fond du Lac
- Forest
- Grant
- Green
- Green Lake
- Iowa
- Jefferson
- Kenosha
- Lafayette
- Lincoln
- Marathon
- Marquette
- Monroe
- Outagamie
- Ozaukee
- Sauk
- Shawano
- Sheboygan
- St. Croix
- Taylor
- Vilas
- Walworth
- Washington
- Winnebago
- Wood

==== Counties that flipped from Progressive to Republican ====
- Bayfield
- Burnett
- Douglas
- Pierce
- Polk
- Washburn

== Analysis ==
As things turned out, Wisconsin would be comfortably, if not overwhelmingly, carried by Republican nominee Hughes, who won the state by 6.29 percentage points. Signs of the collapse of German Catholic Democratic loyalties were seen in Hughes carrying Ozaukee County, which no Republican had ever won before and was Wisconsin's only county to resist major Republican landslides by backing both William Jennings Bryan in 1896 and 1900 and Alton Brooks Parker in 1904. This German Catholic Democratic collapse – broken abruptly by a powerful vote for coreligionist Al Smith in 1928 and for Franklin D. Roosevelt in 1932 – would be a major feature of interwar Wisconsin presidential politics.

By backing Wilson, Portage County voted for the statewide loser for the first time ever; the county's bellwether streak had extended all the way back to Wisconsin's statehood in 1848. Simultaneously, this election began several very long bellwether streaks in other counties: Adams County and Jackson County would back the statewide winner in every election until 2020; Washburn County in every election until 2000; Burnett County in every election until 1980; and Eau Claire County in every election until 1968.

== See also ==
- United States presidential elections in Wisconsin
