= 1904 United States presidential election in Wisconsin =

- November 8, 1904
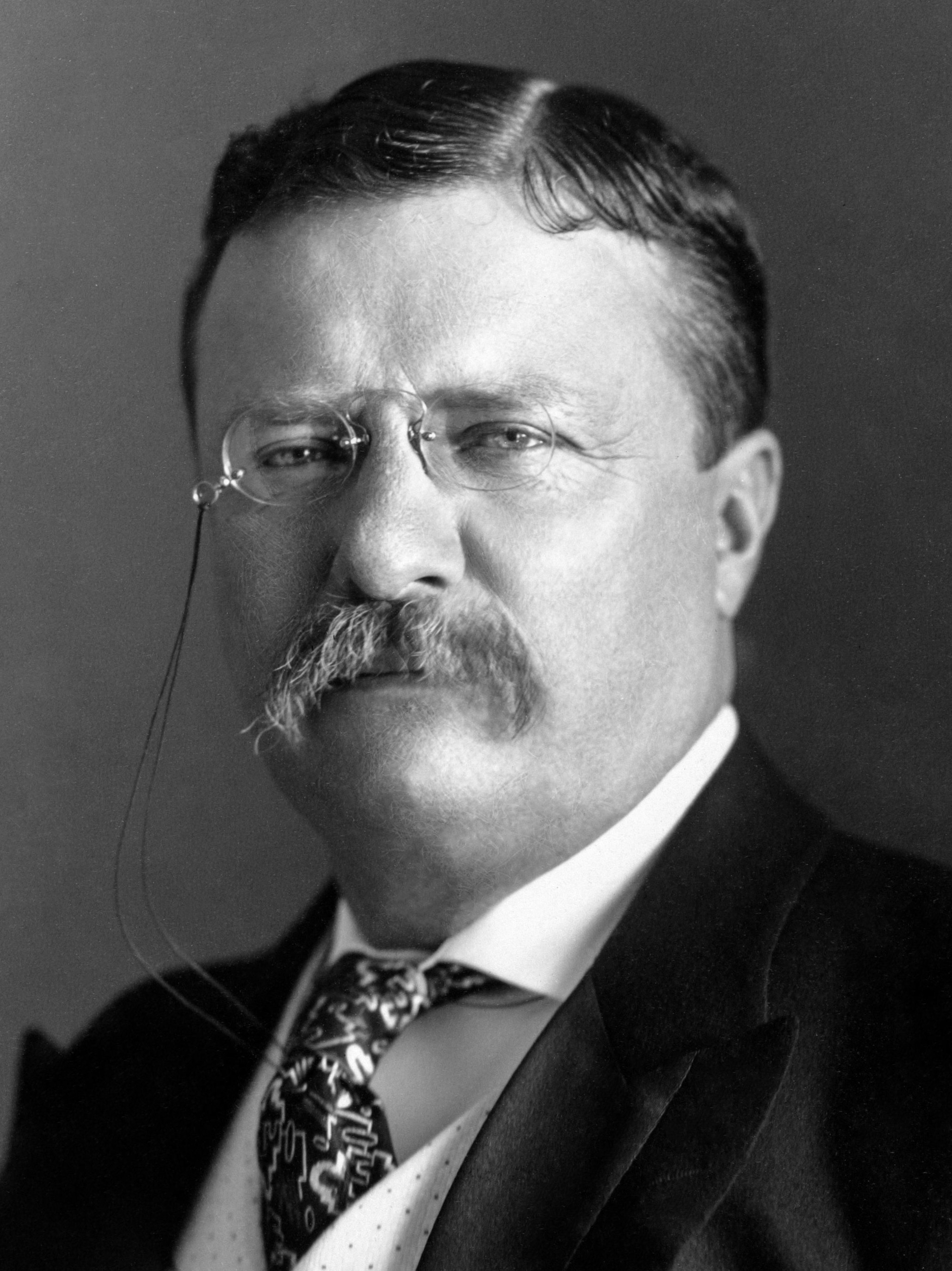

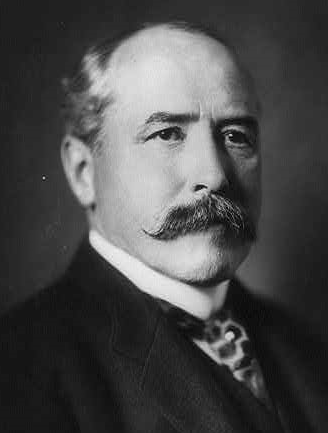

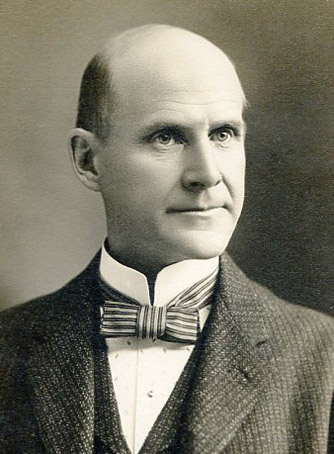
Nominee	Theodore Roosevelt	Alton B. Parker	Eugene V. Debs
Party	Republican	Democratic	Social-Democratic
Home state	New York	New York	Indiana
Running mate	Charles W. Fairbanks	Henry G. Davis	Ben Hanford
Electoral vote	13	0	0
Popular vote	280,164	124,107	28,220
Percentage	63.24%	28.01%	6.37%
County results
Roosevelt
40–50%
50–60%
60–70%
70–80%
80–90%
Parker
40–50%
50–60%
President before election
Theodore Roosevelt
Republican
Elected President
Theodore Roosevelt
Republican

The 1904 United States presidential election in Wisconsin was held on November 8, 1904, as part of the 1904 United States presidential election. State voters chose 13 electors to the Electoral College, who voted for president and vice president.

Wisconsin during the Third Party System was a Republican-leaning but competitive state whereby historically anti-Civil War German Catholic counties stood opposed to highly pro-war and firmly Republican Yankee areas. However, following the Populist movement, whose inflationary monetary policies were opposed by almost all urban classes and viewed as dangerously radical by rural German Catholics, Wisconsin's upper classes, along with the majority of workers who followed them, completely fled from William Jennings Bryan’s agrarian and free silver sympathies.

Wisconsin would henceforth become almost a one-party polity dominated by the Republican Party. The Democratic Party became entirely uncompetitive outside the previously anti-Yankee areas adjoining Lake Michigan in the eastern part of the state. As Democratic strength weakened severely after 1894 – although the state did develop a strong Social-Democratic Party to provide opposition to the GOP – Wisconsin developed the direct Republican primary in 1903 and this ultimately created competition between the “League” under Robert M. La Follette, and the conservative “Regular” faction.

Neither Republican incumbent Theodore Roosevelt nor Democratic nominee Alton B. Parker would campaign in Wisconsin, as the state had been amongst the most Republican in the nation in the presidential elections in both 1896 and 1900. No official polls were taken in the state, but Frederick W. Cotzhausen, a lifelong Milwaukee Democrat, said during October that the state would vote strongly for Roosevelt.

Wisconsin would vote powerfully for Roosevelt, who defeated Parker more than two-to-one, and beat William McKinley’s 1896 performance by almost four percent. Roosevelt was the first Republican since Abraham Lincoln in 1860 to win Calumet County.

== Results ==
General Election Results (Note: The 1905 Blue Book gives the totals as Roosevelt 285,315; Parker 124,205; Debs 28,240; Swallow 9,872; Watson 560; Corregan 249. Based on the Board of Canvassers report, these totals are simply incorrect; no elector on any ticket received those numbers of votes. Indeed, the Blue Book is an unreliable source for Wisconsin election data from about 1890 to 1920 and its figures frequently differ from the figures listed in the Board of Canvassers reports.)
Party	Pledged to	Elector	Votes
Republican Party	Theodore Roosevelt	Charles F. Ilsley	280,164 (Note: The county figures add up to 280,169)
Republican Party	Theodore Roosevelt	Albert R. Hall	279,870
Republican Party	Theodore Roosevelt	George Beyer	279,858
Republican Party	Theodore Roosevelt	John I. Sherron	279,846
Republican Party	Theodore Roosevelt	James M. Bushnell	279,820
Republican Party	Theodore Roosevelt	Fred C. Lorenz	279,758
Republican Party	Theodore Roosevelt	Fred W. Cords	279,722
Republican Party	Theodore Roosevelt	Jame H. Cabanis	279,712
Republican Party	Theodore Roosevelt	Carl S. Porter	279,671
Republican Party	Theodore Roosevelt	Hulbert A. Bright	279,630
Republican Party	Theodore Roosevelt	Edward McGlachlin	279,586
Republican Party	Theodore Roosevelt	Melvin D. Keith	279,527
Republican Party	Theodore Roosevelt	Ed L. Peet	278,690
Democratic Party	Alton B. Parker	Harold L. North	124,107 (Note: The county figures add up to 124,081)
Democratic Party	Alton B. Parker	Charles Abresch	124,036
Democratic Party	Alton B. Parker	Patrick H. Martin	123,820
Democratic Party	Alton B. Parker	Thomas McCarthy	123,791
Democratic Party	Alton B. Parker	John M. Baer	123,774
Democratic Party	Alton B. Parker	Franz Markus	123,766
Democratic Party	Alton B. Parker	Carl F. Justman	123,744
Democratic Party	Alton B. Parker	Thomas H. Patterson	123,725
Democratic Party	Alton B. Parker	Stephen Richmond	123,707
Democratic Party	Alton B. Parker	Henry J. Millmann	123,706
Democratic Party	Alton B. Parker	Henry Volkmann	123,703
Democratic Party	Alton B. Parker	Gilbert T. Hodges	123,694
Democratic Party	Alton B. Parker	Thomas J. McCloskey	123,678
Social-Democratic Party (Note: In Wisconsin, the Socialist Party of America was still referred to as the Social-Democratic Party in 1904)	Eugene V. Debs	A. A. Blunt	28,220
Social-Democratic Party	Eugene V. Debs	William Kaufmann	28,178
Social-Democratic Party	Eugene V. Debs	Eugene H. Rooney	28,175
Social-Democratic Party	Eugene V. Debs	William C. Young	28,170
Social-Democratic Party	Eugene V. Debs	Ernst Schultz	28,167
Social-Democratic Party	Eugene V. Debs	Edward Ziegler	28,166
Social-Democratic Party	Eugene V. Debs	Fred Wilson	28,165
Social-Democratic Party	Eugene V. Debs	Herman Hein	28,154
Social-Democratic Party	Eugene V. Debs	Frank Weber	28,149
Social-Democratic Party	Eugene V. Debs	Edward Scaife	28,140
Social-Democratic Party	Eugene V. Debs	John J. Handley	28,135
Social-Democratic Party	Eugene V. Debs	William Quinn	28,124
Social-Democratic Party	Eugene V. Debs	George Gollwitzer	28,076
Prohibition Party	Silas C. Swallow	Jasper Dexter	9,770
Prohibition Party	Silas C. Swallow	Charles W. Rose	9,760
Prohibition Party	Silas C. Swallow	Frank R. Derrick	9,748
Prohibition Party	Silas C. Swallow	Lafayette Brockway	9,741
Prohibition Party	Silas C. Swallow	Hermann H. Rottman	9,741
Prohibition Party	Silas C. Swallow	Benjamin F. Thomas	9,741
Prohibition Party	Silas C. Swallow	James H. McManus	9,740
Prohibition Party	Silas C. Swallow	William Ager	9,739
Prohibition Party	Silas C. Swallow	John Sherman	9,735
Prohibition Party	Silas C. Swallow	William E. Monroe	9,733
Prohibition Party	Silas C. Swallow	Edson Schatto	9,731
Prohibition Party	Silas C. Swallow	George C. Alborn	9,727
Prohibition Party	Silas C. Swallow	Elsworth McKenney	9,721
People's Party	Silas C. Swallow	Cyrus M. Butt	530
People's Party	Silas C. Swallow	William A. Ramsey	511
People's Party	Silas C. Swallow	Samuel Isaac	510
People's Party	Silas C. Swallow	William Munro	509
People's Party	Silas C. Swallow	Frederick W. Stearns	508
People's Party	Silas C. Swallow	Edward W. Luedtke	507
People's Party	Silas C. Swallow	Louis Elholm	506
People's Party	Silas C. Swallow	Ole Swennes	505
People's Party	Silas C. Swallow	John Gruhl	504
People's Party	Silas C. Swallow	Peter Haan	502
People's Party	Silas C. Swallow	Charles Hatch	500
People's Party	Silas C. Swallow	Michael Seidel	499
People's Party	Silas C. Swallow	Charles M. Boyles	497
Socialist Labor Party (Note: The Socialist Labor Party ran only 12 electors on its Wisconsin ticket)	Charles H. Corregan	Theodore Horn	223
Socialist Labor Party	Charles H. Corregan	Carl Doescher	218
Socialist Labor Party	Charles H. Corregan	Carl Bartsch	217
Socialist Labor Party	Charles H. Corregan	Herman Beyer	217
Socialist Labor Party	Charles H. Corregan	William Pietsch	215
Socialist Labor Party	Charles H. Corregan	Carl Schulz	215
Socialist Labor Party	Charles H. Corregan	Carl Slabey	215
Socialist Labor Party	Charles H. Corregan	Joseph Pietsch	214
Socialist Labor Party	Charles H. Corregan	Paul Unruh	214
Socialist Labor Party	Charles H. Corregan	Ernest Wegner	214
Socialist Labor Party	Charles H. Corregan	Rudolph Kler	212
Socialist Labor Party	Charles H. Corregan	Nicholas Semmelback	212
Votes cast (Note: Based on totals for highest elector on each ticket)			443,014

=== Results by county ===
County	Theodore Roosevelt Republican		Alton B. Parker Democratic		Eugene V. Debs Socialist		Silas C. Swallow Prohibition		Thomas E. Watson Populist		Joseph F. Malloney Socialist Labor		Margin		Total votes cast (Note: Based on highest elector on each ticket)
County	#	%	#	%	#	%	#	%	#	%	#	%	#	%	Total votes cast
Adams	1,399	80.08%	271	15.51%	29	1.66%	47	2.69%	1	0.06%	0	0.00%	1,128	64.57%	1,747
Ashland	3,406	71.30%	1,016	21.27%	235	4.92%	116	2.43%	2	0.04%	2	0.04%	2,390	50.03%	4,777
Barron	3,575	78.33%	625	13.69%	103	2.26%	242	5.30%	9	0.20%	10	0.22%	2,950	64.64%	4,564
Bayfield	2,665	85.31%	345	11.04%	32	1.02%	77	2.46%	0	0.00%	5	0.16%	2,320	74.26%	3,124
Brown	6,027	66.09%	2,636	28.91%	329	3.61%	108	1.18%	7	0.08%	12	0.13%	3,391	37.19%	9,119
Buffalo	2,147	68.35%	911	29.00%	10	0.32%	64	2.04%	9	0.29%	0	0.00%	1,236	39.35%	3,141
Burnett	1,262	88.13%	82	5.73%	31	2.16%	54	3.77%	1	0.07%	2	0.14%	1,180	82.40%	1,432
Calumet	1,736	55.04%	1,257	39.85%	116	3.68%	36	1.14%	9	0.29%	0	0.00%	479	15.19%	3,154
Chippewa	3,744	66.51%	1,669	29.65%	59	1.05%	141	2.50%	11	0.20%	5	0.09%	2,075	36.86%	5,629
Clark	4,091	75.69%	1,050	19.43%	79	1.46%	183	3.39%	1	0.02%	1	0.02%	3,041	56.26%	5,405
Columbia	4,737	67.59%	1,907	27.21%	158	2.25%	204	2.91%	2	0.03%	0	0.00%	2,830	40.38%	7,008
Crawford	2,281	61.12%	1,363	36.52%	31	0.83%	57	1.53%	0	0.00%	0	0.00%	918	24.60%	3,732
Dane	11,041	63.77%	5,610	32.40%	242	1.40%	417	2.41%	3	0.02%	0	0.00%	5,431	31.37%	17,313
Dodge	4,248	44.51%	5,092	53.35%	67	0.70%	133	1.39%	4	0.04%	0	0.00%	-844	-8.84%	9,544
Door	2,689	81.21%	515	15.55%	33	1.00%	72	2.17%	2	0.06%	0	0.00%	2,174	65.66%	3,311
Douglas	4,564	73.05%	968	15.49%	549	8.79%	130	2.08%	8	0.13%	29	0.46%	3,596	57.55%	6,248
Dunn	3,303	81.27%	546	13.44%	83	2.04%	123	3.03%	7	0.17%	2	0.05%	2,757	67.84%	4,064
Eau Claire	4,343	73.20%	1,224	20.63%	196	3.30%	155	2.61%	10	0.17%	5	0.08%	3,119	52.57%	5,933
Florence	562	85.54%	82	12.48%	5	0.76%	8	1.22%	0	0.00%	0	0.00%	480	73.06%	657
Fond du Lac	7,021	59.57%	4,416	37.47%	149	1.26%	178	1.51%	21	0.18%	1	0.01%	2,605	22.10%	11,786
Forest	988	82.68%	159	13.31%	23	1.92%	23	1.92%	2	0.17%	0	0.00%	829	69.37%	1,195
Gates	1,415	81.70%	245	14.15%	23	1.33%	47	2.71%	1	0.06%	1	0.06%	1,170	67.55%	1,732
Grant	5,802	64.50%	2,888	32.11%	77	0.86%	219	2.43%	8	0.09%	1	0.01%	2,914	32.40%	8,995
Green	2,990	62.11%	1,460	30.33%	139	2.89%	219	4.55%	5	0.10%	1	0.02%	1,530	31.78%	4,814
Green Lake	2,181	60.90%	1,269	35.44%	43	1.20%	84	2.35%	3	0.08%	1	0.03%	912	25.47%	3,581
Iowa	3,328	64.58%	1,640	31.83%	21	0.41%	162	3.14%	2	0.04%	0	0.00%	1,688	32.76%	5,153
Iron	1,250	81.17%	246	15.97%	16	1.04%	25	1.62%	2	0.13%	1	0.06%	1,004	65.19%	1,540
Jackson	2,746	82.22%	479	14.34%	26	0.78%	89	2.66%	0	0.00%	0	0.00%	2,267	67.87%	3,340
Jefferson	3,669	47.78%	3,764	49.02%	96	1.25%	147	1.91%	2	0.03%	1	0.01%	-95	-1.24%	7,679
Juneau	3,234	70.15%	1,243	26.96%	42	0.91%	78	1.69%	11	0.24%	2	0.04%	1,991	43.19%	4,610
Kenosha	3,307	60.96%	1,592	29.35%	440	8.11%	77	1.42%	5	0.09%	4	0.07%	1,715	31.61%	5,425
Kewaunee	1,578	49.76%	1,455	45.88%	99	3.12%	36	1.14%	3	0.09%	0	0.00%	123	3.88%	3,171
La Crosse	5,506	61.82%	3,086	34.65%	115	1.29%	189	2.12%	7	0.08%	3	0.03%	2,420	27.17%	8,906
Lafayette	2,875	58.28%	1,921	38.94%	28	0.57%	106	2.15%	1	0.02%	2	0.04%	954	19.34%	4,933
Langlade	2,103	65.72%	1,018	31.81%	30	0.94%	46	1.44%	2	0.06%	1	0.03%	1,085	33.91%	3,200
Lincoln	2,850	70.49%	1,004	24.83%	106	2.62%	69	1.71%	13	0.32%	1	0.02%	1,846	45.66%	4,043
Manitowoc	4,626	53.31%	3,271	37.69%	687	7.92%	93	1.07%	1	0.01%	0	0.00%	1,355	15.61%	8,678
Marathon	6,144	63.11%	3,245	33.33%	178	1.83%	158	1.62%	3	0.03%	7	0.07%	2,899	29.78%	9,735
Marinette	3,977	77.30%	816	15.86%	195	3.79%	144	2.80%	11	0.21%	2	0.04%	3,161	61.44%	5,145
Marquette	1,604	65.68%	747	30.59%	9	0.37%	81	3.32%	1	0.04%	0	0.00%	857	35.09%	2,442
Milwaukee	32,587	46.22%	18,547	26.31%	18,339	26.01%	935	1.33%	30	0.04%	61	0.09%	14,040	19.92%	70,499
Monroe	3,892	66.78%	1,749	30.01%	35	0.60%	145	2.49%	7	0.12%	0	0.00%	2,143	36.77%	5,828
Oconto	3,279	73.95%	1,017	22.94%	62	1.40%	68	1.53%	5	0.11%	3	0.07%	2,262	51.01%	4,434
Oneida	1,710	75.66%	373	16.50%	130	5.75%	44	1.95%	1	0.04%	2	0.09%	1,337	59.16%	2,260
Outagamie	5,951	63.72%	3,138	33.60%	113	1.21%	133	1.42%	2	0.02%	2	0.02%	2,813	30.12%	9,339
Ozaukee	1,492	47.67%	1,494	47.73%	111	3.55%	26	0.83%	6	0.19%	1	0.03%	-2	-0.06%	3,130
Pepin	1,033	74.16%	327	23.47%	3	0.22%	29	2.08%	0	0.00%	1	0.07%	706	50.68%	1,393
Pierce	3,492	82.32%	594	14.00%	24	0.57%	129	3.04%	3	0.07%	0	0.00%	2,898	68.32%	4,242
Polk	2,985	85.55%	296	8.48%	98	2.81%	101	2.89%	2	0.06%	7	0.20%	2,689	77.07%	3,489
Portage	3,634	61.10%	2,168	36.45%	44	0.74%	101	1.70%	1	0.02%	0	0.00%	1,466	24.65%	5,948
Price	2,202	80.25%	399	14.54%	71	2.59%	70	2.55%	2	0.07%	0	0.00%	1,803	65.71%	2,744
Racine	5,573	55.62%	2,584	25.79%	1,453	14.50%	257	2.57%	147	1.47%	5	0.05%	2,989	29.83%	10,019
Richland	2,696	61.52%	1,340	30.58%	48	1.10%	295	6.73%	3	0.07%	0	0.00%	1,356	30.94%	4,382
Rock	7,972	71.69%	2,350	21.13%	458	4.12%	316	2.84%	22	0.20%	2	0.02%	5,622	50.56%	11,120
Sauk	4,805	67.55%	1,914	26.91%	52	0.73%	342	4.81%	0	0.00%	0	0.00%	2,891	40.64%	7,113
Sawyer	782	75.05%	204	19.58%	13	1.25%	29	2.78%	13	1.25%	1	0.10%	578	55.47%	1,042
Shawano	3,684	72.61%	1,237	24.38%	24	0.47%	118	2.33%	10	0.20%	1	0.02%	2,447	48.23%	5,074
Sheboygan	6,121	57.19%	3,430	32.05%	901	8.42%	198	1.85%	33	0.31%	19	0.18%	2,691	25.14%	10,702
St. Croix	3,898	68.35%	1,569	27.51%	108	1.89%	116	2.03%	10	0.18%	2	0.04%	2,329	40.84%	5,703
Taylor	1,725	68.10%	719	28.39%	44	1.74%	42	1.66%	2	0.08%	1	0.04%	1,006	39.72%	2,533
Trempealeau	3,560	75.63%	976	20.74%	10	0.21%	156	3.31%	5	0.11%	0	0.00%	2,584	54.90%	4,707
Vernon	4,744	82.42%	758	13.17%	28	0.49%	220	3.82%	6	0.10%	0	0.00%	3,986	69.25%	5,756
Vilas	1,467	79.17%	321	17.32%	39	2.10%	25	1.35%	0	0.00%	1	0.05%	1,146	61.85%	1,853
Walworth	4,892	73.33%	1,378	20.66%	135	2.02%	263	3.94%	3	0.04%	0	0.00%	3,514	52.68%	6,671
Washburn	989	77.51%	207	16.22%	48	3.76%	31	2.43%	0	0.00%	1	0.08%	782	61.29%	1,276
Washington	2,565	52.10%	2,233	45.36%	68	1.38%	55	1.12%	2	0.04%	0	0.00%	332	6.74%	4,923
Waukesha	5,247	62.68%	2,686	32.09%	231	2.76%	205	2.45%	1	0.01%	1	0.01%	2,561	30.59%	8,371
Waupaca	5,471	81.45%	941	14.01%	70	1.04%	233	3.47%	2	0.03%	0	0.00%	4,530	67.44%	6,717
Waushara	3,140	87.59%	319	8.90%	25	0.70%	96	2.68%	3	0.08%	2	0.06%	2,821	78.69%	3,585
Winnebago	7,565	62.19%	4,006	32.93%	311	2.56%	259	2.13%	15	0.12%	8	0.07%	3,559	29.26%	12,164
Wood	4,002	67.02%	1,674	28.04%	195	3.27%	96	1.61%	4	0.07%	0	0.00%	2,328	38.99%	5,971
Total	280,164 (Note: The county figures add up to 280,169)	63.24%	124,107 (Note: The county figures add up to 124,081)	28.01%	28,220	6.37%	9,770	2.21%	530	0.12%	223	0.05%	156,057	35.23%	443,014

==== Counties that flipped from Democratic to Republican ====
- Calumet

== See also ==
- United States presidential elections in Wisconsin
