= 1900 United States presidential election in Wisconsin =

- November 6, 1900
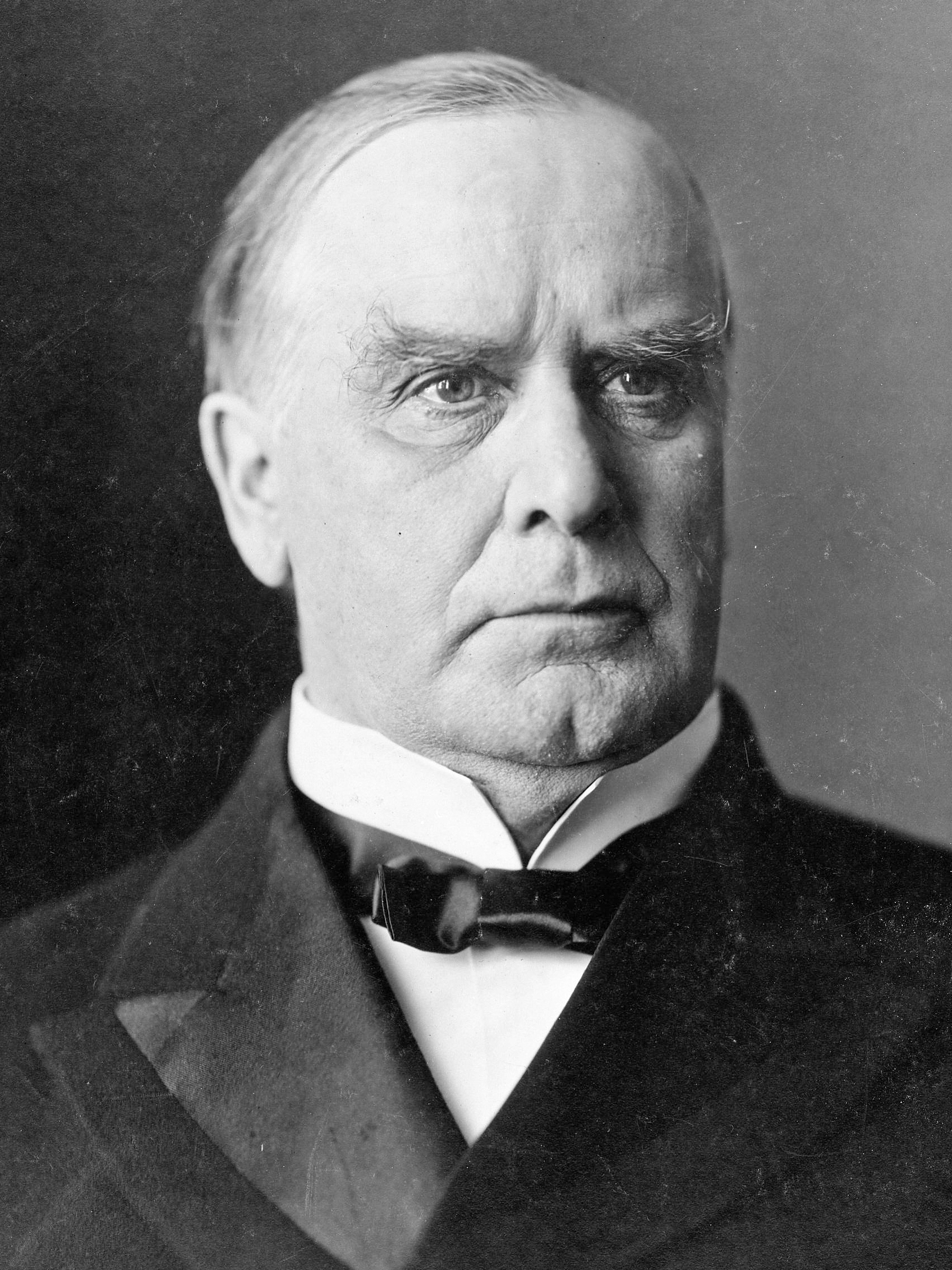

Nominee	William McKinley	William Jennings Bryan
Party	Republican	Democratic
Home state	Ohio	Nebraska
Running mate	Theodore Roosevelt	Adlai Stevenson I
Electoral vote	12	0
Popular vote	265,756	159,279
Percentage	60.04%	35.99%
County results
McKinley
40–50%
50–60%
60–70%
70–80%
80–90%
Bryan
50–60%
President before election
William McKinley
Republican
Elected President
William McKinley
Republican

The 1900 United States presidential election in Wisconsin was held on November 6 as part of the 1900 United States presidential election. State voters chose 12 electors to the Electoral College, who voted for president and vice president.

Wisconsin during the Third Party System was a Republican-leaning but competitive state whereby historically anti-Civil War German Catholic counties stood opposed to highly pro-war and firmly Republican Yankee areas. However, following the Populist movement, whose inflationary monetary policies were opposed by almost all urban classes and viewed as dangerously radical by rural German Catholics, Wisconsin's upper classes, along with the majority of workers who followed them, completely fled from William Jennings Bryan’s agrarian and free silver sympathies. Although in 1892 Grover Cleveland had become the first Democrat to carry the state since the formation of the Republican Party, in 1896 Wisconsin would prove to be Republican William McKinley’s strongest state outside the Northeast, as Bryan’s free silver monetary policy gained little support from dairy farmers who were less affected by drought or debt than wheat growers.

Wisconsin would henceforth become almost a one-party polity dominated by the Republican Party. The Democratic Party became entirely noncompetitive outside the previously anti-Yankee areas adjoining Lake Michigan in the eastern part of the state. In response to Democratic strength weakening severely after 1894, however, challenges within the state Republican Party from Robert M. La Follette would emerge rapidly, with the progressive reformer being elected Governor coincident with the presidential election.

Despite McKinley’s large win in 1896, Wisconsin was considered doubtful at the beginning of the 1900 campaign. However, by the middle of October expert opinion suggested strongly that McKinley would carry the state, and that the state’s Democrats were abandoning nominee William Jennings Bryan for the second consecutive election. This was confirmed by polls just before Election Day, and as it turned out McKinley essentially repeated his three-to-two success of 1896, winning by 24.05% and carrying all but four counties. McKinley's popular vote share of 60.04% broke his own record from the previous election for the largest by any candidate in Wisconsin to that point. Once again, this record would be broken in the next election.

Bryan had previously lost Wisconsin to McKinley four years earlier and would later lose the state again in 1908 to William Howard Taft.

== Results ==
General Election Results (Note: The 1901 Blue Book gives the totals as McKinley 265,760; Bryan 159,163; Woolley 10,027; Debs 7,048; and Malloney 503. Based on the Board of Canvassers report, these totals are simply incorrect; no elector on the Republican, Democratic, or Prohibition tickets received those numbers of votes. Indeed, the Blue Book is an unreliable source for Wisconsin election data from about 1890 to 1920 and its figures frequently differ from the figures listed in the Board of Canvassers reports.)
Party	Pledged to	Elector	Votes
Republican Party	William McKinley	Willard A. Van Brunt	265,756 (Note: The county figures add up to 265,755)
Republican Party	William McKinley	Henry E. Roethe	265,710
Republican Party	William McKinley	Whitman A. Barber	265,694
Republican Party	William McKinley	William H. J. Kieckhefer	265,686
Republican Party	William McKinley	John Schuette	265,664
Republican Party	William McKinley	John Ochsner	265,651
Republican Party	William McKinley	Charles M. Fenelon	265,586
Republican Party	William McKinley	John D. Nelsenius	265,562
Republican Party	William McKinley	Atley Peterson	265,556
Republican Party	William McKinley	Fred A. Severance	265,546
Republican Party	William McKinley	George A. Yule	265,534
Republican Party	William McKinley	Augustus G. Wiessert	265,506
Democratic Party	William Jennings Bryan	Patrick O'Meara	159,279 (Note: This stated total seems likely to be a mistake; the county figures add up to 159,079. If it is a mistake, then Rosch would be the highest Democratic elector. The Wisconsin Board of Canvassers reports for presidential electors often have mistakes (oddly, however, the reports for congressmen and state officers rarely have mistakes), though the 1900 election is unusual in that the report has mistakes for the highest electors on some tickets.)
Democratic Party	William Jennings Bryan	John Rosch	159,136
Democratic Party	William Jennings Bryan	Frederick W. Von Cotzhausen	159,134
Democratic Party	William Jennings Bryan	George W. Stevenson	159,133
Democratic Party	William Jennings Bryan	Benjamin F. Sherman	159,109
Democratic Party	William Jennings Bryan	John Berger	159,090
Democratic Party	William Jennings Bryan	Henry J. Millman	159,081
Democratic Party	William Jennings Bryan	William N. Coffland	159,048
Democratic Party	William Jennings Bryan	George D. Cline	159,047
Democratic Party	William Jennings Bryan	Stephen Richmond	159,043
Democratic Party	William Jennings Bryan	August C. Voshardt	159,031
Democratic Party	William Jennings Bryan	Amos Holgate	159,020
Prohibition Party	John G. Woolley	Samuel D. Hastings	10,022
Prohibition Party	John G. Woolley	John W. Evans	10,010
Prohibition Party	John G. Woolley	William A. McKillop	10,003
Prohibition Party	John G. Woolley	Chris Solum	9,992
Prohibition Party	John G. Woolley	Benjamin F. Thomas	9,991
Prohibition Party	John G. Woolley	William Ager	9,989
Prohibition Party	John G. Woolley	Benjamin F. Parker	9,989
Prohibition Party	John G. Woolley	Lorenzo D. Fargo	9,979
Prohibition Party	John G. Woolley	James S. Thompson	9,979
Prohibition Party	John G. Woolley	Joshua H. Berkey	9,978
Prohibition Party	John G. Woolley	James P. Corse	9,974
Prohibition Party	John G. Woolley	George I. Constance	9,940
Social Democratic Party	Eugene V. Debs	August Mohr	7,051
Social Democratic Party	Eugene V. Debs	Frederic Heath	7,048
Social Democratic Party	Eugene V. Debs	William Anderson	7,043
Social Democratic Party	Eugene V. Debs	Joseph Braun	7,043
Social Democratic Party	Eugene V. Debs	Frank J. Ira	7,041
Social Democratic Party	Eugene V. Debs	Fred W. Rehfeld	7,030
Social Democratic Party	Eugene V. Debs	Jacob Hunger	7,022
Social Democratic Party	Eugene V. Debs	E. P. Hassinger	7,018
Social Democratic Party	Eugene V. Debs	Frank Gutheil	7,014
Social Democratic Party	Eugene V. Debs	Frederic Althen	7,010
Social Democratic Party	Eugene V. Debs	Otto Kundert	7,005
Social Democratic Party	Eugene V. Debs	Vincent Bezucha	6,984
Socialist Labor Party	Joseph F. Malloney	Otto E. Harder	505
Socialist Labor Party	Joseph F. Malloney	Ernst Pagel	505
Socialist Labor Party	Joseph F. Malloney	Max Boehme	504
Socialist Labor Party	Joseph F. Malloney	Hy. Mensing Sr.	503
Socialist Labor Party	Joseph F. Malloney	Joseph Petersen	503
Socialist Labor Party	Joseph F. Malloney	Ernst Koch	502
Socialist Labor Party	Joseph F. Malloney	John Meyer	502
Socialist Labor Party	Joseph F. Malloney	Charles Slaby	502
Socialist Labor Party	Joseph F. Malloney	Louis Brand	500
Socialist Labor Party	Joseph F. Malloney	Albert Roeder	498
Socialist Labor Party	Joseph F. Malloney	Carl Korn	497
Socialist Labor Party	Joseph F. Malloney	Louis Schienbein	496
Votes cast (Note: Based on totals for highest elector on each ticket)			442,613

=== Results by county ===
County	William McKinley Republican		William Jennings Bryan Democratic		John G. Woolley Prohibition		Eugene V. Debs Social Democratic		Joseph F. Malloney Socialist Labor		Margin		Total votes cast (Note: Based on highest elector on each ticket)
County	#	%	#	%	#	%	#	%	#	%	#	%	Total votes cast
Adams	1,513	77.47%	409	20.94%	29	1.48%	2	0.10%	0	0.00%	1,104	56.53%	1,953
Ashland	3,032	63.93%	1,559	32.87%	103	2.17%	42	0.89%	7	0.15%	1,473	31.06%	4,743
Barron	2,949	72.89%	944	23.33%	149	3.68%	4	0.10%	0	0.00%	2,005	49.56%	4,046
Bayfield	2,426	76.92%	632	20.04%	80	2.54%	8	0.25%	8	0.25%	1,794	56.88%	3,154
Brown	4,938	56.82%	3,585	41.25%	133	1.53%	28	0.32%	6	0.07%	1,353	15.57%	8,690
Buffalo	2,093	62.44%	1,204	35.92%	55	1.64%	0	0.00%	0	0.00%	889	26.52%	3,352
Burnett	1,108	80.29%	216	15.65%	48	3.48%	2	0.14%	6	0.43%	892	64.64%	1,380
Calumet	1,629	45.14%	1,905	52.78%	54	1.50%	21	0.58%	0	0.00%	-276	-7.65%	3,609
Chippewa	4,215	61.90%	2,443	35.88%	140	2.06%	9	0.13%	2	0.03%	1,772	26.02%	6,809
Clark	3,865	74.80%	1,156	22.37%	124	2.40%	15	0.29%	7	0.14%	2,709	52.43%	5,167
Columbia	4,756	65.64%	2,184	30.14%	282	3.89%	22	0.30%	2	0.03%	2,572	35.50%	7,246
Crawford	2,333	62.48%	1,356	36.31%	44	1.18%	0	0.00%	1	0.03%	977	26.16%	3,734
Dane	9,396	58.41%	6,129	38.10%	512	3.18%	44	0.27%	4	0.02%	3,267	20.31%	16,085
Dodge	4,785	44.37%	5,813	53.90%	177	1.64%	9	0.08%	1	0.01%	-1,028	-9.53%	10,785
Door	2,363	76.23%	677	21.84%	57	1.84%	2	0.06%	1	0.03%	1,686	54.39%	3,100
Douglas	4,448	63.80%	2,191	31.43%	178	2.55%	133	1.91%	22	0.32%	2,257	32.37%	6,972
Dunn	3,044	70.79%	1,110	25.81%	144	3.35%	2	0.05%	0	0.00%	1,934	44.98%	4,300
Eau Claire	4,379	66.45%	1,966	29.83%	181	2.75%	61	0.93%	3	0.05%	2,413	36.62%	6,590
Florence	514	79.57%	110	17.03%	17	2.63%	3	0.46%	2	0.31%	404	62.54%	646
Fond du Lac	6,257	53.82%	5,137	44.19%	210	1.81%	20	0.17%	1	0.01%	1,120	9.63%	11,625
Forest	378	76.99%	94	19.14%	18	3.67%	1	0.20%	0	0.00%	284	57.84%	491
Grant	5,610	61.18%	3,250	35.45%	284	3.10%	22	0.24%	3	0.03%	2,360	25.74%	9,169
Green	2,996	60.21%	1,776	35.69%	164	3.30%	40	0.80%	0	0.00%	1,220	24.52%	4,976
Green Lake	2,084	56.46%	1,521	41.21%	81	2.19%	4	0.11%	1	0.03%	563	15.25%	3,691
Iowa	3,270	62.49%	1,746	33.37%	203	3.88%	14	0.27%	0	0.00%	1,524	29.12%	5,233
Iron	1,318	76.76%	357	20.79%	38	2.21%	3	0.17%	1	0.06%	961	55.97%	1,717
Jackson	2,639	77.75%	650	19.15%	103	3.03%	2	0.06%	0	0.00%	1,989	58.60%	3,394
Jefferson	3,725	46.20%	4,131	51.23%	199	2.47%	8	0.10%	0	0.00%	-406	-5.04%	8,063
Juneau	2,914	63.35%	1,586	34.48%	98	2.13%	2	0.04%	0	0.00%	1,328	28.87%	4,600
Kenosha	3,077	58.38%	2,101	39.86%	63	1.20%	27	0.51%	3	0.06%	976	18.52%	5,271
Kewaunee	1,750	49.86%	1,726	49.17%	31	0.88%	3	0.09%	0	0.00%	24	0.68%	3,510
La Crosse	5,326	58.28%	3,605	39.45%	198	2.17%	9	0.10%	1	0.01%	1,721	18.83%	9,139
Lafayette	2,852	55.82%	2,101	41.12%	153	2.99%	2	0.04%	1	0.02%	751	14.70%	5,109
Langlade	1,595	58.23%	1,085	39.61%	48	1.75%	5	0.18%	6	0.22%	510	18.62%	2,739
Lincoln	2,146	56.68%	1,553	41.02%	70	1.85%	15	0.40%	2	0.05%	593	15.66%	3,786
Manitowoc	4,319	49.52%	4,162	47.72%	65	0.75%	171	1.96%	4	0.05%	157	1.80%	8,721
Marathon	4,716	54.33%	3,767	43.40%	132	1.52%	28	0.32%	37	0.43%	949	10.93%	8,680
Marinette	4,239	70.96%	1,538	25.74%	176	2.95%	17	0.28%	4	0.07%	2,701	45.21%	5,974
Marquette	1,558	63.05%	866	35.05%	47	1.90%	0	0.00%	0	0.00%	692	28.00%	2,471
Milwaukee	34,809	52.56%	25,558	38.59%	751	1.13%	4,874	7.36%	235	0.35%	9,251	13.97%	66,227
Monroe	3,713	60.32%	2,248	36.52%	194	3.15%	0	0.00%	0	0.00%	1,465	23.80%	6,155
Oconto	2,753	69.71%	1,117	28.29%	74	1.87%	3	0.08%	2	0.05%	1,636	41.43%	3,949
Oneida	1,801	70.24%	711	27.73%	37	1.44%	13	0.51%	2	0.08%	1,090	42.51%	2,564
Outagamie	5,244	55.15%	4,009	42.16%	224	2.36%	28	0.29%	3	0.03%	1,235	12.99%	9,508
Ozaukee	1,281	38.76%	1,965	59.46%	37	1.12%	21	0.64%	1	0.03%	-684	-20.70%	3,305
Pepin	1,097	68.31%	470	29.27%	39	2.43%	0	0.00%	0	0.00%	627	39.04%	1,606
Pierce	3,432	72.94%	1,042	22.15%	224	4.76%	6	0.13%	1	0.02%	2,390	50.80%	4,705
Polk	2,735	77.48%	694	19.66%	72	2.04%	16	0.45%	13	0.37%	2,041	57.82%	3,530
Portage	3,283	54.57%	2,635	43.80%	92	1.53%	4	0.07%	2	0.03%	648	10.77%	6,016
Price	1,725	74.32%	525	22.62%	55	2.37%	14	0.60%	2	0.09%	1,200	51.70%	2,321
Racine	5,921	58.36%	3,853	37.98%	233	2.30%	133	1.31%	5	0.05%	2,068	20.38%	10,145
Richland	2,594	59.54%	1,523	34.96%	230	5.28%	10	0.23%	0	0.00%	1,071	24.58%	4,357
Rock	8,247	69.95%	3,096	26.26%	403	3.42%	36	0.31%	8	0.07%	5,151	43.69%	11,790
Sauk	4,326	60.84%	2,493	35.06%	276	3.88%	12	0.17%	3	0.04%	1,833	25.78%	7,110
Sawyer	723	68.40%	307	29.04%	23	2.18%	4	0.38%	0	0.00%	416	39.36%	1,057
Shawano	3,242	67.29%	1,504	31.22%	68	1.41%	3	0.06%	1	0.02%	1,738	36.07%	4,818
Sheboygan	5,930	53.79%	4,044	36.68%	123	1.12%	880	7.98%	48	0.44%	1,886	17.11%	11,025
St. Croix	3,369	59.00%	2,076	36.36%	202	3.54%	52	0.91%	11	0.19%	1,293	22.64%	5,710
Taylor	1,419	57.47%	1,012	40.99%	22	0.89%	15	0.61%	1	0.04%	407	16.48%	2,469
Trempealeau	3,362	71.21%	1,190	25.21%	167	3.54%	1	0.02%	1	0.02%	2,172	46.01%	4,721
Vernon	4,463	75.58%	1,270	21.51%	154	2.61%	16	0.27%	2	0.03%	3,193	54.07%	5,905
Vilas	1,208	69.35%	486	27.90%	37	2.12%	10	0.57%	1	0.06%	722	41.45%	1,742
Walworth	5,104	71.42%	1,741	24.36%	293	4.10%	6	0.08%	2	0.03%	3,363	47.06%	7,146
Washburn	807	74.24%	249	22.91%	29	2.67%	1	0.09%	1	0.09%	558	51.33%	1,087
Washington	2,615	50.27%	2,522	48.48%	56	1.08%	7	0.13%	2	0.04%	93	1.79%	5,202
Waukesha	5,126	60.90%	3,016	35.83%	252	2.99%	19	0.23%	4	0.05%	2,110	25.07%	8,417
Waupaca	5,283	76.24%	1,382	19.95%	258	3.72%	3	0.04%	3	0.04%	3,901	56.30%	6,929
Waushara	2,990	82.03%	525	14.40%	127	3.48%	3	0.08%	0	0.00%	2,465	67.63%	3,645
Winnebago	7,464	55.69%	5,598	41.77%	306	2.28%	27	0.20%	8	0.06%	1,866	13.92%	13,403
Wood	3,134	61.12%	1,877	36.60%	76	1.48%	34	0.66%	7	0.14%	1,257	24.51%	5,128
Total	265,756 (Note: The county figures add up to 265,755)	60.04%	159,279 (Note: The county figures add up to 159,079)	35.99%	10,022	2.27%	7,051	1.59%	505	0.11%	106,480	24.05%	442,613

==== Counties that flipped from Democratic to Republican ====
- Lincoln

==== Counties that flipped from Republican to Democratic ====
- Dodge
- Jefferson

== See also ==
- United States presidential elections in Wisconsin
