= 1908 United States presidential election in Wisconsin =

- November 3, 1908

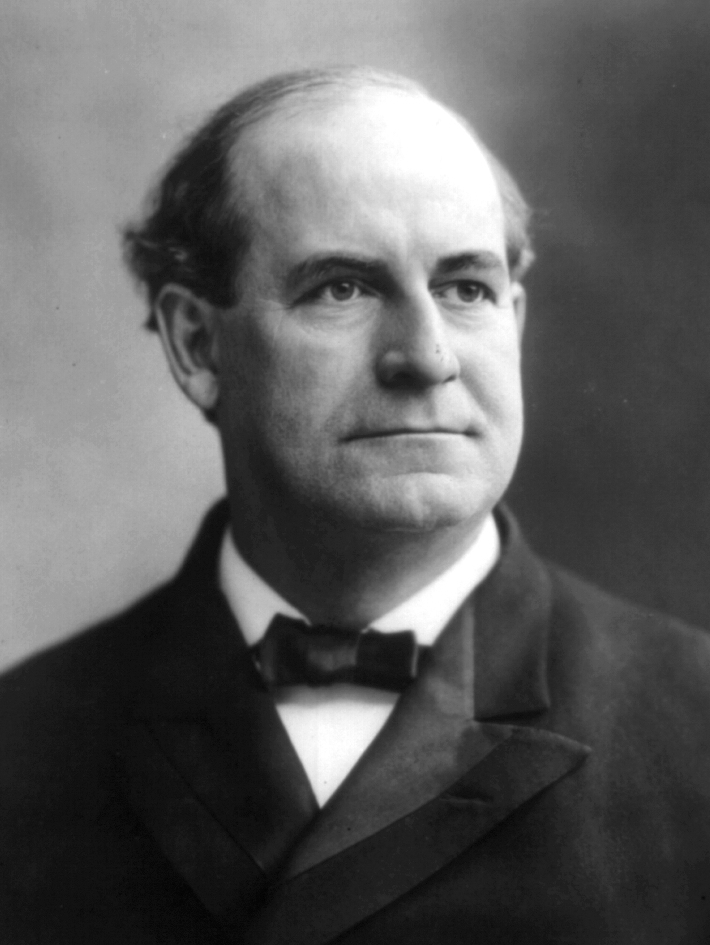

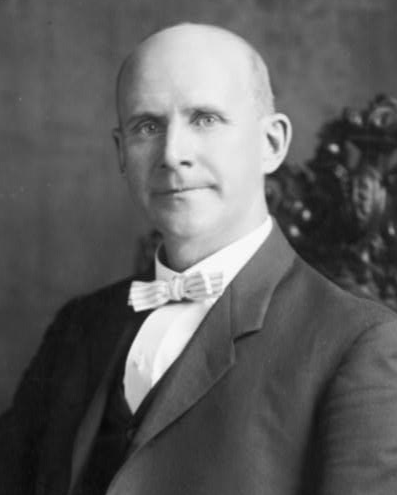
Nominee	William Howard Taft	William Jennings Bryan	Eugene V. Debs
Party	Republican	Democratic	Social-Democratic
Home state	Ohio	Nebraska	Indiana
Running mate	James S. Sherman	John W. Kern	Ben Hanford
Electoral vote	13	0	0
Popular vote	247,747	166,632	28,170
Percentage	54.51%	36.66%	6.20%
County results
Taft
30–40%
40–50%
50–60%
60–70%
70–80%
80–90%
Bryan
40–50%
50–60%
President before election
Theodore Roosevelt
Republican
Elected President
William Howard Taft
Republican

The 1908 United States presidential election in Wisconsin was held on November 3, 1908, as part of the 1908 United States presidential election. State voters chose 13 electors to the Electoral College, who voted for president and vice president.

Ever since the decline of the Populist movement, Wisconsin had become almost a one-party state dominated by the Republican Party. The Democratic Party became entirely uncompetitive outside certain German Catholic counties adjoining Lake Michigan as the upper classes, along with the majority of workers who followed them, completely fled from William Jennings Bryan’s agrarian and free silver sympathies. As Democratic strength weakened severely after 1894 – although the state did develop a strong Social-Democratic Party to provide opposition to the GOP – Wisconsin developed the direct Republican primary in 1903 and this ultimately created competition between the “League” under Robert M. La Follette, and the conservative “Regular” faction.

When William Jennings Bryan was nominated for a third presidential bid, he visited Wisconsin in early August to urge the Democrats in the state legislature to support his state policies. An earlier poll had suggested Bryan gaining a substantial part of the radical La Follette following, and Bryan would ridicule new Republican nominee William Howard Taft in Milwaukee during the last week of September.

Despite Bryan's campaigns, October polls by the Chicago Record-Herald said that Wisconsin was certain to vote for Taft, As things turned out, the Record-Herald polls were accurate, with Taft winning by eighty-one thousand votes, and carrying all but six counties. However, Taft's victory, while still large, was considerably narrower than the Republican victories in the state in the previous three elections.

Bryan had previously lost Wisconsin to William McKinley in both 1896 and 1900.

== Results ==
General Election Results (Note: The 1909 Blue Book gives the totals as Taft 247,747; Bryan 166,662; Debs 28,147; Chafin 11,565; Gillhaus 318; Scattering 2. Based on the Board of Canvassers report, with the exception of Taft, these numbers are simply incorrect. For the other parties, no elector on any ticket received those numbers of votes. Indeed, the Blue Book is an unreliable source for Wisconsin election data from about 1890 to 1920 and its figures frequently differ from the figures listed in the Board of Canvassers reports.)
Party	Pledged to	Elector	Votes
Republican Party	William Howard Taft	William C. Brumder	247,747
Republican Party	William Howard Taft	Frank M. Durkee	247,696
Republican Party	William Howard Taft	John Dengler	247,689
Republican Party	William Howard Taft	John M. Beffel	247,683
Republican Party	William Howard Taft	Robert H. DeLap	247,681
Republican Party	William Howard Taft	W. T. Sarles	247,681
Republican Party	William Howard Taft	Florian Lampert	247,679
Republican Party	William Howard Taft	C. F. Greenwood	247,678
Republican Party	William Howard Taft	Herbert L. Peterson	247,678
Republican Party	William Howard Taft	John A. Stolper	247,677
Republican Party	William Howard Taft	William Kohl	247,675
Republican Party	William Howard Taft	D. E. Riordan	247,668
Republican Party	William Howard Taft	O. K. Hawley	247,666
Democratic Party	William Jennings Bryan	Ernest C. Zimmerman	166,632
Democratic Party	William Jennings Bryan	Adolph J. Schmitz	166,603
Democratic Party	William Jennings Bryan	Gilbert T. Hodges	166,595
Democratic Party	William Jennings Bryan	Edward L. Luckow	166,585
Democratic Party	William Jennings Bryan	W. S. Henry	166,583
Democratic Party	William Jennings Bryan	Edward C. Wall	166,583
Democratic Party	William Jennings Bryan	John Toohey	166,574
Democratic Party	William Jennings Bryan	Patrick O'Meara	166,571
Democratic Party	William Jennings Bryan	Thomas H. Ryan	166,526
Democratic Party	William Jennings Bryan	Philip Sheridan	166,503
Democratic Party	William Jennings Bryan	Frank J. Egerer	166,488
Democratic Party	William Jennings Bryan	Emil Wittzack	166,486
Democratic Party	William Jennings Bryan	Thomas Emmerton	166,484
Social-Democratic Party (Note: In Wisconsin, the Socialist Party of America was still referred to as the Social-Democratic Party in 1908)	Eugene V. Debs	C. W. Staples	28,170
Social-Democratic Party	Eugene V. Debs	J. E. Harris	28,168
Social-Democratic Party	Eugene V. Debs	C. I. Sandquist	28,168
Social-Democratic Party	Eugene V. Debs	Julius Crary	28,167
Social-Democratic Party	Eugene V. Debs	Martin Georgenson	28,167
Social-Democratic Party	Eugene V. Debs	Robert Seidel	28,167
Social-Democratic Party	Eugene V. Debs	John C. Boll	28,165
Social-Democratic Party	Eugene V. Debs	Walter Ramstack	28,165
Social-Democratic Party	Eugene V. Debs	F. W. Hammond	28,164
Social-Democratic Party	Eugene V. Debs	Frank Metcalf	28,164
Social-Democratic Party	Eugene V. Debs	Joseph Paul	28,164
Social-Democratic Party	Eugene V. Debs	Henry Durham	28,163
Social-Democratic Party	Eugene V. Debs	Arne Peterson	28,161
Prohibition Party	Eugene W. Chafin	Lincoln Abraham	11,572
Prohibition Party	Eugene W. Chafin	Olav Repsdal	11,564
Prohibition Party	Eugene W. Chafin	Truman T. Parker	11,557
Prohibition Party	Eugene W. Chafin	John W. Evans	11,554
Prohibition Party	Eugene W. Chafin	Richard B. Griggs	11,554
Prohibition Party	Eugene W. Chafin	Dyer Walters	11,554
Prohibition Party	Eugene W. Chafin	Moritz A. Schmoyer	11,552
Prohibition Party	Eugene W. Chafin	Charles L. Allen	11,551
Prohibition Party	Eugene W. Chafin	Will E. Mack	11,550
Prohibition Party	Eugene W. Chafin	William R. Nethercut	11,550
Prohibition Party	Eugene W. Chafin	Charles W. Lomas	11,548
Prohibition Party	Eugene W. Chafin	George W. Wilson	11,525
Prohibition Party	Eugene W. Chafin	Henry Jorgenson	11,516
Socialist Labor Party (Note: The Socialist Labor Party ran only 4 electors on its Wisconsin ticket)	August Gillhaus	Fred Bartsch	314
Socialist Labor Party	August Gillhaus	Carl Schulz	313
Socialist Labor Party	August Gillhaus	Henry Boll	312
Socialist Labor Party	August Gillhaus	Fred Kremer	312
Write-in		Scattering	99 (Note: Includes 39 votes for August Gillhaus and 32 votes for Donald R. Monroe; these were the Socialist Labor nominees for President and Vice President, respectively. Since voters in Wisconsin chose electors directly, these were votes Gillhaus and Monroe as electors, not as presidential candidates.)
Votes cast (Note: Based on totals for highest elector on each ticket)			454,534

=== Results by county ===
County	William Howard Taft Republican		William Jennings Bryan Democratic		Eugene V. Debs Social-Democratic		Eugene W. Chafin Prohibition		August Gillhaus Socialist Labor		Margin		Total votes cast (Note: Based on highest elector on each ticket)
County	#	%	#	%	#	%	#	%	#	%	#	%	Total votes cast
Adams	1,167	68.97%	436	25.77%	32	1.89%	56	3.31%	1	0.06%	731	43.20%	1,692
Ashland	2,259	54.21%	1,582	37.96%	213	5.11%	110	2.64%	3	0.07%	677	16.25%	4,167
Barron	3,247	66.43%	1,266	25.90%	130	2.66%	243	4.97%	2	0.04%	1,981	40.53%	4,888
Bayfield	1,957	70.52%	569	20.50%	174	6.27%	72	2.59%	3	0.11%	1,388	50.02%	2,775
Brown	4,947	55.25%	3,353	37.45%	517	5.77%	129	1.44%	8	0.09%	1,594	17.80%	8,954
Buffalo	1,937	63.72%	1,027	33.78%	20	0.66%	56	1.84%	0	0.00%	910	29.93%	3,040
Burnett	1,181	72.14%	296	18.08%	65	3.97%	94	5.74%	1	0.06%	885	54.06%	1,637
Calumet	1,576	46.33%	1,711	50.29%	85	2.50%	30	0.88%	0	0.00%	-135	-3.97%	3,402
Chippewa	3,526	59.07%	2,203	36.91%	90	1.51%	148	2.48%	2	0.03%	1,323	22.16%	5,969
Clark	3,491	65.74%	1,576	29.68%	90	1.69%	153	2.88%	0	0.00%	1,915	36.06%	5,310
Columbia	4,072	60.12%	2,363	34.89%	140	2.07%	198	2.92%	0	0.00%	1,709	25.23%	6,773
Crawford	2,041	54.25%	1,586	42.16%	63	1.67%	72	1.91%	0	0.00%	455	12.09%	3,762
Dane	9,441	52.42%	7,818	43.41%	257	1.43%	488	2.71%	5	0.03%	1,623	9.01%	18,011 (Note: Includes 2 Scattering votes)
Dodge	4,015	39.66%	5,883	58.12%	63	0.62%	162	1.60%	0	0.00%	-1,868	-18.45%	10,123
Door	2,463	73.92%	778	23.35%	37	1.11%	52	1.56%	1	0.03%	1,685	50.57%	3,332 (Note: Includes 1 Scattering vote)
Douglas	3,509	55.88%	1,715	27.31%	653	10.40%	257	4.09%	146	2.32%	1,794	28.57%	6,280
Dunn	3,297	74.36%	914	20.61%	119	2.68%	104	2.35%	0	0.00%	2,383	53.74%	4,434
Eau Claire	3,980	64.50%	1,859	30.12%	158	2.56%	174	2.82%	0	0.00%	2,121	34.37%	6,171
Florence	541	81.11%	102	15.29%	5	0.75%	19	2.85%	0	0.00%	439	65.82%	667
Fond du Lac	5,872	50.86%	5,194	44.99%	230	1.99%	243	2.10%	5	0.04%	678	5.87%	11,545
Forest	1,023	71.69%	324	22.70%	46	3.22%	31	2.17%	3	0.21%	699	48.98%	1,427
Grant	4,989	55.08%	3,696	40.81%	83	0.92%	289	3.19%	0	0.00%	1,293	14.28%	9,057
Green	2,617	54.49%	1,856	38.64%	121	2.52%	209	4.35%	0	0.00%	761	15.84%	4,803
Green Lake	2,094	55.15%	1,608	42.35%	32	0.84%	63	1.66%	0	0.00%	486	12.80%	3,797
Iowa	2,986	56.18%	2,077	39.08%	12	0.23%	238	4.48%	2	0.04%	909	17.10%	5,315
Iron	1,134	73.97%	314	20.48%	42	2.74%	43	2.80%	0	0.00%	820	53.49%	1,533
Jackson	2,603	77.91%	631	18.89%	40	1.20%	65	1.95%	2	0.06%	1,972	59.02%	3,341
Jefferson	3,207	40.41%	4,492	56.60%	71	0.89%	162	2.04%	2	0.03%	-1,285	-16.19%	7,936
Juneau	2,454	57.58%	1,691	39.68%	37	0.87%	78	1.83%	2	0.05%	763	17.90%	4,262
Kenosha	3,409	54.50%	2,006	32.07%	601	9.61%	239	3.82%	0	0.00%	1,403	22.43%	6,255
Kewaunee	1,590	46.48%	1,731	50.60%	63	1.84%	37	1.08%	0	0.00%	-141	-4.12%	3,421
La Crosse	4,382	50.14%	4,054	46.38%	112	1.28%	190	2.17%	2	0.02%	328	3.75%	8,740
Lafayette	2,832	55.92%	2,100	41.47%	24	0.47%	107	2.11%	0	0.00%	732	14.45%	5,064
Langlade	1,921	57.22%	1,340	39.92%	33	0.98%	63	1.88%	0	0.00%	581	17.31%	3,357
Lincoln	2,308	53.89%	1,813	42.33%	99	2.31%	63	1.47%	0	0.00%	495	11.56%	4,283
Manitowoc	4,126	45.37%	3,952	43.45%	950	10.45%	62	0.68%	5	0.05%	174	1.91%	9,095
Marathon	5,258	50.69%	4,703	45.34%	276	2.66%	133	1.28%	3	0.03%	555	5.35%	10,373
Marinette	3,454	63.49%	1,597	29.36%	154	2.83%	235	4.32%	0	0.00%	1,857	34.14%	5,440
Marquette	1,555	64.42%	798	33.06%	17	0.70%	44	1.82%	0	0.00%	757	31.36%	2,414
Milwaukee	28,625	38.94%	26,000	35.37%	17,496	23.80%	1,277	1.74%	57	0.08%	2,625	3.57%	73,506 (Note: Includes 51 Scattering votes)
Monroe	3,304	58.11%	2,155	37.90%	91	1.60%	136	2.39%	0	0.00%	1,149	20.21%	5,686
Oconto	3,020	64.78%	1,453	31.17%	114	2.45%	74	1.59%	1	0.02%	1,567	33.61%	4,662
Oneida	1,536	58.92%	688	26.39%	354	13.58%	28	1.07%	1	0.04%	848	32.53%	2,607
Outagamie	5,079	52.34%	4,286	44.17%	118	1.22%	209	2.15%	12	0.12%	793	8.17%	9,704
Ozaukee	1,216	38.47%	1,856	58.72%	60	1.90%	28	0.89%	1	0.03%	-640	-20.25%	3,161
Pepin	1,010	67.42%	447	29.84%	5	0.33%	36	2.40%	0	0.00%	563	37.58%	1,498
Pierce	2,988	71.62%	978	23.44%	56	1.34%	150	3.60%	0	0.00%	2,010	48.18%	4,172
Polk	2,788	71.99%	816	21.07%	124	3.20%	145	3.74%	0	0.00%	1,972	50.92%	3,873
Portage	3,269	56.42%	2,362	40.77%	50	0.86%	112	1.93%	1	0.02%	907	15.65%	5,794
Price	1,738	65.26%	609	22.87%	236	8.86%	79	2.97%	1	0.04%	1,129	42.40%	2,663
Racine	5,490	52.65%	3,688	35.37%	794	7.61%	429	4.11%	0	0.00%	1,802	17.28%	10,428 (Note: Includes 27 Scattering votes)
Richland	2,464	54.80%	1,689	37.57%	51	1.13%	291	6.47%	1	0.02%	775	17.24%	4,496
Rock	7,839	66.73%	3,227	27.47%	264	2.25%	391	3.33%	12	0.10%	4,612	39.26%	11,747 (Note: Includes 14 Scattering votes)
Rusk	1,431	67.82%	532	25.21%	96	4.55%	48	2.27%	3	0.14%	899	42.61%	2,110
Sauk	3,854	57.06%	2,571	38.07%	35	0.52%	294	4.35%	0	0.00%	1,283	19.00%	6,754
Sawyer	815	70.81%	299	25.98%	19	1.65%	18	1.56%	0	0.00%	516	44.83%	1,151
Shawano	3,349	63.90%	1,750	33.39%	40	0.76%	102	1.95%	0	0.00%	1,599	30.51%	5,241
Sheboygan	5,948	52.41%	4,405	38.81%	752	6.63%	245	2.16%	0	0.00%	1,543	13.59%	11,350
St. Croix	3,228	62.29%	1,773	34.21%	83	1.60%	98	1.89%	0	0.00%	1,455	28.08%	5,182
Taylor	1,627	60.80%	924	34.53%	82	3.06%	42	1.57%	1	0.04%	703	26.27%	2,676
Trempealeau	3,733	75.31%	1,085	21.89%	22	0.44%	117	2.36%	0	0.00%	2,648	53.42%	4,957
Vernon	4,114	69.72%	1,561	26.45%	38	0.64%	188	3.19%	0	0.00%	2,553	43.26%	5,901
Vilas	794	70.70%	278	24.76%	33	2.94%	18	1.60%	0	0.00%	516	45.95%	1,123
Walworth	4,151	62.20%	1,960	29.37%	73	1.09%	488	7.31%	2	0.03%	2,191	32.83%	6,674
Washburn	1,114	69.06%	396	24.55%	69	4.28%	34	2.11%	0	0.00%	718	44.51%	1,613
Washington	2,588	48.54%	2,625	49.23%	77	1.44%	41	0.77%	1	0.02%	-37	-0.69%	5,332
Waukesha	4,758	55.91%	3,206	37.67%	198	2.33%	345	4.05%	3	0.04%	1,552	18.24%	8,510
Waupaca	4,785	71.93%	1,483	22.29%	143	2.15%	239	3.59%	2	0.03%	3,302	49.64%	6,652
Waushara	2,821	79.73%	507	14.33%	82	2.32%	114	3.22%	14	0.40%	2,314	65.40%	3,538
Winnebago	6,797	52.24%	5,511	42.36%	287	2.21%	413	3.17%	3	0.02%	1,286	9.88%	13,011
Wood	3,013	50.92%	2,498	42.22%	274	4.63%	132	2.23%	0	0.00%	515	8.70%	5,917
Total	247,747	54.51%	166,632	36.66%	28,170	6.20%	11,572	2.55%	314	0.07%	81,115	17.85%	454,534

==== Counties that flipped from Republican to Democratic ====
- Calumet
- Kewaunee
- Washington

== See also ==
- United States presidential elections in Wisconsin
