= 1896 United States presidential election in Wisconsin =

- November 3, 1896

Nominee	William McKinley	William Jennings Bryan
Party	Republican	Democratic
Home state	Ohio	Nebraska
Running mate	Garret Hobart	Arthur Sewall
Electoral vote	12	0
Popular vote	268,051	165,349
Percentage	59.95%	36.98%
County results
McKinley
40–50%
50–60%
60–70%
70–80%
80–90%
Bryan
50–60%
President before election
Grover Cleveland
Democratic
Elected President
William McKinley
Republican

The 1896 United States presidential election in Wisconsin was held on November 3, 1896, as part of the 1896 United States presidential election. State voters chose 12 electors to the Electoral College, who voted for president and vice president.

Wisconsin during the Third Party System was a Republican-leaning but competitive state whereby historically anti-Civil War German Catholic counties stood opposed to highly pro-war and firmly Republican Yankee areas. The German Catholics’ Democratic loyalties were related to their opposition to Republican pietism and to the fact that during the Civil War, they had been extremely hostile to Abraham Lincoln’s wartime draft policies which often singled them out.

Four years prior had seen, aided by favorable demographic shifts, opposition to the notorious “Bennett Law” requiring attendance at public schools, and a shift of some GOP voters to Prohibition Party nominee John Bidwell, Democratic nominee Grover Cleveland carry the state for the first time since before the Republican Party was formed. However, expectations that demographic shifts would favor the Democrats were rudely crushed in 1894, when the Republicans took every Congressional seat in the state. President Cleveland became extremely unpopular and the Democratic Party turned towards the Populist movement active in the West in order to revive its fortunes. While the Populist movement would gain almost universal acceptance in the silver mining West, its inflationary monetary policies were opposed by almost all urban classes and viewed as dangerously radical by rural German Catholics, with free silver being condemned by the Church hierarchy.

Early polls always had Wisconsin strong for Republican nominee William McKinley, with his supporters saying it would be one of the most Republican states despite voting Democratic in 1892. During his fall tour of the Midwest, Democratic nominee William Jennings Bryan made fifteen speeches, but was disturbed by a member of McKinley's club, who attempted to mob Bryan in Janesville.

As it turned out, McKinley would carry Wisconsin handsomely by over one hundred thousand votes and by a margin of 22.97%. Wisconsin would be McKinley's strongest state outside the Northeast. McKinley's 59.95% popular vote share was the highest received by any candidate in Wisconsin to that point, though McKinley would break his own record four years later.

Bryan would lose Wisconsin to McKinley again four years later and would later lose the state again in 1908 to William Howard Taft.

McKinley's landslide victory made him the first Republican to ever carry Kewaunee County, Langlade County, Oneida County, Outagamie County, and Washington County. Additionally, McKinley was the first Republican since John C. Frémont in 1856 to win Dodge County and Marathon County and the first Republican since Abraham Lincoln in 1860 to win Jefferson County and Manitowoc County. Waukesha County's well-known Republican tilt began with this election; in prior elections it had been a swing county in Wisconsin but starting with this election, became solidly Republican and has only voted for a Democrat five times since 1892.

== Results ==
General Election Results (Note: The 1897 Blue Book gives the totals as McKinley 268,135; Bryan 165,523; Levering 7,507; Palmer 4,584; Matchett 1,314; and Bentley 346. Based on the Board of Canvassers report, these totals are simply incorrect; no elector on any ticket received those numbers of votes. Indeed, the Blue Book is an unreliable source for Wisconsin election data from about 1890 to 1920 and its figures frequently differ from the figures listed in the Board of Canvassers reports.)
Party	Pledged to	Elector	Votes
Republican Party	William McKinley	John D. Nelsenius	268,051
Republican Party	William McKinley	William J. Mallmann	268,042
Republican Party	William McKinley	Ossian M. Pettit	268,033
Republican Party	William McKinley	Paul Lachmund	268,030
Republican Party	William McKinley	Mark Curtis	268,027
Republican Party	William McKinley	Ellicott R. Stillman	267,994
Republican Party	William McKinley	George D. Breed	267,993
Republican Party	William McKinley	Frederick A. Hollmann	267,969
Republican Party	William McKinley	Iver Pederson	267,963
Republican Party	William McKinley	Oakman A. Ellis	267,960
Republican Party	William McKinley	Samuel J. Bradford	267,948
Republican Party	William McKinley	Lewis C. Boyle	267,767
Democratic Party	William Jennings Bryan	George W. Cate	165,349 (Note: This stated total seems likely to be a mistake; the county figures add up to 165,389. There are a number of counties where Cate's figure differ from those of Winans, but it would require a combination of multiple mistakes in the county figures to bring Cate's county total down to 165,349, so a mistake in the addition is more likely to be the error. The Wisconsin Board of Canvassers reports for presidential electors often have mistakes (oddly, however, the reports for congressmen and state officers rarely have mistakes), though the 1896 election is unusual in that the report has mistakes for the highest electors on some tickets.)
Democratic Party	William Jennings Bryan	John Winans	165,340
Democratic Party	William Jennings Bryan	Michael J. Warner	165,299
Democratic Party	William Jennings Bryan	Ernst Merton	165,292
Democratic Party	William Jennings Bryan	Henry Steinman	165,292
Democratic Party	William Jennings Bryan	Owen King	165,277
Democratic Party	William Jennings Bryan	Albinos A. Worsley	165,271
Democratic Party	William Jennings Bryan	John L. Beau	165,258
Democratic Party	William Jennings Bryan	Charles L. Brekken	165,251
Democratic Party	William Jennings Bryan	Herman Naber	165,243
Democratic Party	William Jennings Bryan	Lester Woodward	165,229
Democratic Party	William Jennings Bryan	Christian Roemer	164,824
Prohibition Party	Joshua Levering	Charles Alexander	7,463 (Note: The county figures for Alexander add up to 7,464.)
Prohibition Party	Joshua Levering	John C. Martin	7,461
Prohibition Party	Joshua Levering	Henry A. Miner	7,457
Prohibition Party	Joshua Levering	Charles F. Cronk	7,456
Prohibition Party	Joshua Levering	Charles Edward Reed	7,453
Prohibition Party	Joshua Levering	Newcomb E. Tully	7,452
Prohibition Party	Joshua Levering	Henry Happell	7,451
Prohibition Party	Joshua Levering	Solomon Vandewalker	7,448
Prohibition Party	Joshua Levering	John Faville	7,446
Prohibition Party	Joshua Levering	Almon Francis Collins	7,445
Prohibition Party	Joshua Levering	John R. Ogden	7,445
Prohibition Party	Joshua Levering	Elisha G. Partidge	7,438
National Democratic Party	John M. Palmer	John B. Kupfer	4,553
National Democratic Party	John M. Palmer	Charles Franz	4,552
National Democratic Party	John M. Palmer	George Krouskop	4,552
National Democratic Party	John M. Palmer	John C. Ludwig	4,552
National Democratic Party	John M. Palmer	Casper H. M. Petersen	4,550
National Democratic Party	John M. Palmer	William Dichmann	4,549
National Democratic Party	John M. Palmer	C. Hugo Jacobi	4,549
National Democratic Party	John M. Palmer	Bedford B. Hopkins	4,547
National Democratic Party	John M. Palmer	August Ledyard Smith	4,545
National Democratic Party	John M. Palmer	Samuel N. Dickinson	4,544
National Democratic Party	John M. Palmer	Lyman Nash	4,544
National Democratic Party	John M. Palmer	William F. Shea	4,543
Socialist Labor Party	Charles H. Matchett	Ruchus Babnik	1,311
Socialist Labor Party	Charles H. Matchett	Fred Farchmin	1,311
Socialist Labor Party	Charles H. Matchett	Fred Bugelman	1,310
Socialist Labor Party	Charles H. Matchett	Carl Groeschel	1,310
Socialist Labor Party	Charles H. Matchett	Gustav Lauenstein	1,310
Socialist Labor Party	Charles H. Matchett	Charles Weiss	1,310
Socialist Labor Party	Charles H. Matchett	Albert Pippenburg	1,309
Socialist Labor Party	Charles H. Matchett	John Kettemann	1,308
Socialist Labor Party	Charles H. Matchett	Charles Lachmund	1,308
Socialist Labor Party	Charles H. Matchett	Emil Reesch	1,308
Socialist Labor Party	Charles H. Matchett	Paul Reuther	1,308
Socialist Labor Party	Charles H. Matchett	Otto Schultz	1,306
National Party	Charles E. Bentley	Annette J. Shaw	366 (Note: This stated total seems likely to be a mistake; the county totals add up to 336 and there's no obvious county where Shaw is short by 30 votes.)
National Party	Charles E. Bentley	Martha W. Law	326
National Party	Charles E. Bentley	Orvie E. Thompson	326
National Party	Charles E. Bentley	Oliver H. Crowl	324
National Party	Charles E. Bentley	Newell Demeritt	324
National Party	Charles E. Bentley	Lily Runals	324
National Party	Charles E. Bentley	John E. Bartlett	322
National Party	Charles E. Bentley	Henry E. Ward	322
National Party	Charles E. Bentley	George W. Sherwood	321
National Party	Charles E. Bentley	Luther W. Wood	321
National Party	Charles E. Bentley	Gideon Young	321
National Party	Charles E. Bentley	Washington I. Carpenter	320
Votes cast (Note: Based on totals for highest elector on each ticket)			447,093

=== Results by county ===
County	William McKinley Republican		William Jennings Bryan Democratic		Joshua Levering Prohibition		John M. Palmer National Democratic		Charles Matchett Socialist Labor		Charles Eugene Bentley National		Margin		Total votes cast (Note: Based on highest elector on each ticket)
County	#	%	#	%	#	%	#	%	#	%	#	%	#	%	Total votes cast
Adams	1,431	76.73%	391	20.97%	27	1.45%	16	0.86%	0	0.00%	0	0.00%	1,040	55.76%	1,865
Ashland	2,738	59.72%	1,743	38.02%	59	1.29%	26	0.57%	16	0.35%	3	0.07%	995	21.70%	4,585
Barron	2,772	64.77%	1,323	30.91%	155	3.62%	26	0.61%	0	0.00%	4	0.09%	1,449	33.86%	4,280
Bayfield	2,230	71.82%	797	25.67%	59	1.90%	13	0.42%	5	0.16%	1	0.03%	1,433	46.15%	3,105
Brown	5,436	57.53%	3,841	40.65%	87	0.92%	67	0.71%	5	0.05%	13	0.14%	1,595	16.88%	9,449
Buffalo	2,298	61.89%	1,300	35.01%	61	1.64%	51	1.37%	1	0.03%	2	0.05%	998	26.88%	3,713
Burnett	799	67.48%	349	29.48%	28	2.36%	4	0.34%	3	0.25%	1	0.08%	450	38.01%	1,184
Calumet	1,546	44.51%	1,869	53.82%	28	0.81%	27	0.78%	2	0.06%	1	0.03%	-323	-9.30%	3,473
Chippewa	3,599	54.10%	2,927	44.00%	83	1.25%	35	0.53%	6	0.09%	2	0.03%	672	10.10%	6,652
Clark	3,327	69.44%	1,316	27.47%	96	2.00%	39	0.81%	12	0.25%	1	0.02%	2,011	41.97%	4,791
Columbia	4,845	63.59%	2,379	31.22%	278	3.65%	108	1.42%	7	0.09%	2	0.03%	2,466	32.37%	7,619
Crawford	2,322	59.61%	1,508	38.72%	38	0.98%	24	0.62%	2	0.05%	1	0.03%	814	20.90%	3,895
Dane	9,074	56.10%	6,521	40.32%	405	2.50%	158	0.98%	4	0.02%	12	0.07%	2,553	15.78%	16,174
Dodge	5,610	51.61%	4,893	45.01%	119	1.09%	235	2.16%	6	0.06%	8	0.07%	717	6.60%	10,871
Door	2,399	71.29%	894	26.57%	49	1.46%	21	0.62%	1	0.03%	1	0.03%	1,505	44.73%	3,365
Douglas	4,272	61.87%	2,487	36.02%	90	1.30%	46	0.67%	8	0.12%	2	0.03%	1,785	25.85%	6,905
Dunn	3,368	67.97%	1,415	28.56%	131	2.64%	33	0.67%	5	0.10%	3	0.06%	1,953	39.41%	4,955
Eau Claire	4,520	63.41%	2,364	33.16%	186	2.61%	52	0.73%	0	0.00%	6	0.08%	2,156	30.25%	7,128
Florence	488	78.33%	128	20.55%	5	0.80%	2	0.32%	0	0.00%	0	0.00%	360	57.78%	623
Fond du Lac	6,174	54.17%	4,929	43.25%	157	1.38%	128	1.12%	5	0.04%	4	0.04%	1,245	10.92%	11,397
Forest	406	68.01%	172	28.81%	15	2.51%	2	0.34%	0	0.00%	2	0.34%	234	39.20%	597
Grant	5,315	57.42%	3,681	39.76%	187	2.02%	67	0.72%	3	0.03%	4	0.04%	1,634	17.65%	9,257
Green	3,093	54.76%	2,337	41.38%	157	2.78%	53	0.94%	7	0.12%	1	0.02%	756	13.39%	5,648
Green Lake	2,102	55.70%	1,567	41.52%	61	1.62%	32	0.85%	7	0.19%	5	0.13%	535	14.18%	3,774
Iowa	3,115	57.46%	2,059	37.98%	173	3.19%	61	1.13%	3	0.06%	10	0.18%	1,056	19.48%	5,421
Iron	1,288	72.04%	472	26.40%	26	1.45%	0	0.00%	1	0.06%	1	0.06%	816	45.64%	1,788
Jackson	2,708	74.68%	776	21.40%	97	2.68%	36	0.99%	2	0.06%	7	0.19%	1,932	53.28%	3,626
Jefferson	4,341	52.60%	3,504	42.46%	137	1.66%	263	3.19%	4	0.05%	4	0.05%	837	10.14%	8,253
Juneau	2,832	61.49%	1,671	36.28%	59	1.28%	35	0.76%	4	0.09%	5	0.11%	1,161	25.21%	4,606
Kenosha	2,827	60.54%	1,732	37.09%	40	0.86%	62	1.33%	8	0.17%	1	0.02%	1,095	23.45%	4,670
Kewaunee	1,834	51.13%	1,647	45.92%	14	0.39%	91	2.54%	0	0.00%	1	0.03%	187	5.21%	3,587
La Crosse	6,297	64.59%	3,057	31.36%	161	1.65%	224	2.30%	8	0.08%	2	0.02%	3,240	33.23%	9,749
Lafayette	2,918	54.74%	2,236	41.94%	114	2.14%	59	1.11%	1	0.02%	3	0.06%	682	12.79%	5,331
Langlade	1,457	58.80%	956	38.58%	23	0.93%	38	1.53%	4	0.16%	0	0.00%	501	20.22%	2,478
Lincoln	1,706	47.69%	1,802	50.38%	44	1.23%	21	0.59%	2	0.06%	2	0.06%	-96	-2.68%	3,577
Manitowoc	4,430	51.60%	3,917	45.63%	60	0.70%	162	1.89%	11	0.13%	5	0.06%	513	5.98%	8,585
Marathon	3,956	49.61%	3,829	48.01%	70	0.88%	87	1.09%	29	0.36%	4	0.05%	127	1.59%	7,975
Marinette	4,277	68.27%	1,866	29.78%	81	1.29%	29	0.46%	9	0.14%	3	0.05%	2,411	38.48%	6,265
Marquette	1,476	62.84%	827	35.21%	25	1.06%	20	0.85%	0	0.00%	1	0.04%	649	27.63%	2,349
Milwaukee	35,939	55.89%	26,505	41.22%	638	0.99%	510	0.79%	679	1.06%	30	0.05%	9,434	14.67%	64,301
Monroe	3,683	59.48%	2,360	38.11%	102	1.65%	35	0.57%	1	0.02%	11	0.18%	1,323	21.37%	6,192
Oconto	2,836	67.09%	1,289	30.49%	59	1.40%	35	0.83%	5	0.12%	3	0.07%	1,547	36.60%	4,227
Oneida	1,452	70.66%	562	27.35%	27	1.31%	14	0.68%	0	0.00%	0	0.00%	890	43.31%	2,055
Outagamie	5,431	55.44%	4,092	41.77%	138	1.41%	105	1.07%	5	0.05%	25	0.26%	1,339	13.67%	9,796
Ozaukee	1,534	42.80%	1,946	54.30%	30	0.84%	62	1.73%	11	0.31%	1	0.03%	-412	-11.50%	3,584
Pepin	1,301	72.52%	435	24.25%	37	2.06%	19	1.06%	1	0.06%	1	0.06%	866	48.27%	1,794
Pierce	3,724	69.79%	1,412	26.46%	156	2.92%	38	0.71%	3	0.06%	3	0.06%	2,312	43.33%	5,336
Polk	2,860	74.56%	891	23.23%	61	1.59%	23	0.60%	0	0.00%	1	0.03%	1,969	51.33%	3,836
Portage	3,529	53.78%	2,890	44.04%	80	1.22%	54	0.82%	3	0.05%	6	0.09%	639	9.74%	6,562
Price	1,448	70.22%	550	26.67%	37	1.79%	19	0.92%	7	0.34%	1	0.05%	898	43.55%	2,062
Racine	5,848	57.65%	3,970	39.14%	211	2.08%	103	1.02%	8	0.08%	4	0.04%	1,878	18.51%	10,144
Richland	2,636	54.05%	2,098	43.02%	127	2.60%	16	0.33%	0	0.00%	0	0.00%	538	11.03%	4,877
Rock	8,281	67.58%	3,634	29.66%	235	1.92%	86	0.70%	12	0.10%	5	0.04%	4,647	37.93%	12,253
Sauk	4,623	60.98%	2,608	34.40%	242	3.19%	96	1.27%	9	0.12%	3	0.04%	2,015	26.58%	7,581
Sawyer	514	56.30%	369	40.42%	28	3.07%	2	0.22%	0	0.00%	0	0.00%	145	15.88%	913
Shawano	3,033	64.22%	1,589	33.64%	54	1.14%	32	0.68%	12	0.25%	3	0.06%	1,444	30.57%	4,723
Sheboygan	6,642	62.51%	3,327	31.31%	90	0.85%	245	2.31%	307	2.89%	15	0.14%	3,315	31.20%	10,626
St. Croix	3,462	56.39%	2,475	40.32%	158	2.57%	38	0.62%	4	0.07%	2	0.03%	987	16.08%	6,139
Taylor	1,387	64.60%	709	33.02%	20	0.93%	26	1.21%	2	0.09%	3	0.14%	678	31.58%	2,147
Trempealeau	3,305	67.70%	1,393	28.53%	151	3.09%	23	0.47%	4	0.08%	6	0.12%	1,912	39.16%	4,882
Vernon	4,392	71.36%	1,626	26.42%	102	1.66%	28	0.45%	3	0.05%	4	0.06%	2,766	44.94%	6,155
Vilas	753	61.98%	443	36.46%	8	0.66%	9	0.74%	2	0.16%	0	0.00%	310	25.51%	1,215
Walworth	5,345	70.42%	1,892	24.93%	282	3.72%	57	0.75%	2	0.03%	12	0.16%	3,453	45.49%	7,590
Washburn	771	73.29%	250	23.76%	21	2.00%	8	0.76%	2	0.19%	0	0.00%	521	49.52%	1,052
Washington	2,874	53.16%	2,404	44.47%	31	0.57%	86	1.59%	6	0.11%	5	0.09%	470	8.69%	5,406
Waukesha	5,411	60.96%	3,190	35.94%	161	1.81%	108	1.22%	5	0.06%	2	0.02%	2,221	25.02%	8,877
Waupaca	5,466	75.19%	1,577	21.69%	128	1.76%	65	0.89%	3	0.04%	31	0.43%	3,889	53.49%	7,270
Waushara	3,210	84.36%	456	11.98%	102	2.68%	27	0.71%	0	0.00%	10	0.26%	2,754	72.38%	3,805
Winnebago	7,898	59.25%	5,088	38.17%	210	1.58%	100	0.75%	18	0.14%	15	0.11%	2,810	21.08%	13,329
Wood	2,837	58.98%	1,877	39.02%	53	1.10%	31	0.64%	6	0.12%	6	0.12%	960	19.96%	4,810
Total	268,051	59.95%	165,349 (Note: The county figures add up to 165,389)	36.98%	7,463 (Note: The county figures add up to 7,464)	1.67%	4,553	1.02%	1,311	0.29%	366 (Note: The county figures add up to 336)	0.08%	102,702	22.97%	447,093

==== Counties that flipped from Democratic to Republican ====
- Ashland
- Brown
- Chippewa
- Dane
- Dodge
- Fond du Lac
- Forest
- Green Lake
- Iowa
- Jefferson
- Juneau
- Kenosha
- Kewaunee
- La Crosse
- Langlade
- Manitowoc
- Marathon
- Marinette
- Marquette
- Milwaukee
- Oconto
- Oneida
- Outagamie
- Portage
- Shawano
- Sheboygan
- Taylor
- Washington
- Waukesha
- Winnebago
- Wood

== See also ==
- United States presidential elections in Wisconsin
