= 1928 United States presidential election in Wisconsin =

- November 6, 1928

Nominee	Herbert Hoover	Al Smith
Party	Republican	Democratic
Home state	California	New York
Running mate	Charles Curtis	Joseph T. Robinson
Electoral vote	13	0
Popular vote	544,205	450,259
Percentage	53.52%	44.28%
County results
Hoover
40–50%
50–60%
60–70%
70–80%
Smith
40–50%
50–60%
60–70%
70–80%
President before election
Calvin Coolidge
Republican
Elected President
Herbert Hoover
Republican

The 1928 United States presidential election in Wisconsin was held on November 6, 1928, as part of the 1928 United States presidential election. State voters chose 13 electors to the Electoral College, who voted for president and vice president.

Wisconsin had since the decline of the Populist movement been substantially a one-party state dominated by the Republican Party. The Democratic Party became entirely uncompetitive outside certain German Catholic counties adjoining Lake Michigan as the upper classes, along with the majority of workers who followed them, completely fled from William Jennings Bryan's agrarian and free silver sympathies. As Democratic strength weakened severely after 1894 – although the state did develop a strong Social-Democratic Party to provide opposition to the GOP – Wisconsin developed the direct Republican primary in 1903 and this ultimately created competition between the "League" under Robert M. La Follette, and the conservative "Regular" faction.

The beginning of the 1910s would see a minor Democratic revival as many La Follette progressives endorsed Woodrow Wilson, but this flirtation would not be long-lasting as Wilson's "Anglophile" foreign policies were severely opposed by Wisconsin's largely German- and Scandinavian-American populace. Subsequent federal elections saw the Midwest desert the Democratic Party even more completely due to supposed preferential treatment of Southern farmers, and in 1920 Wisconsin's status as a one-party Republican state was solidified as James M. Cox won less than a sixth of the state's presidential vote and Democrats claimed only four state legislative seats, all but one of which would be lost in 1922. Conservative Southern Democrat John W. Davis would do even worse, winning less than one-twelfth of Wisconsin's 1924 presidential vote, and there would never be more than two Democrats in the state legislature between 1922 and 1928.

Nonetheless, in that 1924 election Wisconsin's popular long-time Republican Senator La Follette would via prevalent isolationist and progressive sentiment carry the state's electoral votes, and when La Follette died the following year his family did not endorse a Republican, but rather New York City Catholic Democrat Al Smith. The nomination of Smith – inevitable with other Democrats sitting the election out – aligned the Democrats towards Wisconsin's sizeable Southern and Eastern European immigrant population, and Smith's Wall Street connections helped reconnect the isolationist, conservative German Catholic areas of eastern Wisconsin who had completely deserted the Democrats over opposition to Wilson's foreign policies.

When Senator John J. Blaine endorsed Smith in late September, it became clear that La Follette's endorsement of him had been shared by other prominent Progressives, despite his son urging that sides not be taken. Polls in October, after both candidates had campaigned in the state, viewed Wisconsin as close but leaning toward Smith. However, when the polls closed, it became clear Hoover was showing greater strength than expected even in the pro-Catholic eastern region, and when returns from Milwaukee came in later Smith did not receive the projected two-to-one majority.

Hoover thus carried Wisconsin by a comfortable 9.24 percentage point margin, still a remarkable transformation from 1920 when the state had been Cox's weakest and Harding won by over 55 percentage points. Smith recouped the Third Party System Democratic counties: in entirely Catholic Marshfield Township which typically gave pre-1916 Democrats over ninety percent but gave Cox only 4 percent, Smith won all but two percent. Hoover's ability to take the La Follette vote in anti-Catholic Scandinavian areas of western Wisconsin was critical in winning him the state. As of 2024, this is the last election in which Douglas County voted for a Republican presidential candidate, and the last time where the WOW counties did not vote in unison for the same presidential candidate, with Waukesha County backing Hoover while Ozaukee and Washington Counties supported Smith.

== Results ==
1928 United States presidential election in Wisconsin
Party	Candidate	Votes	Percentage	Electoral votes
Republican	Herbert Hoover	544,205	53.52%	13
Democratic	Al Smith	450,259	44.28%	0
Social-Democratic	Norman Thomas	18,213	1.79%	0
Prohibition	William F. Varney	2,245	0.22%	0
Independent Workers	William Z. Foster	1,528	0.15%	0
Independent Labor	Verne L. Reynolds	381	0.04%	0
Write-in	Scattering (Note: The Scattering votes are not listed directly by county in the 1929 Blue Book, but they are included in the total vote per county. Thus, the breakdown of the Scattering vote can easily be deduced. The Board of Canvassers report shows the Scattering vote in its own column, separate from the total vote.)	41	0.00%	0
Totals		1,016,872	100.00%	13

=== Results by county ===
County	Herbert Hoover Republican		Al Smith Democratic		Norman Thomas Social-Democratic		Other candidates Various parties		Margin		Total votes cast
County	#	%	#	%	#	%	#	%	#	%	Total votes cast
Adams	1,624	62.95%	914	35.43%	24	0.93%	18	0.70%	710	27.52%	2,580
Ashland	3,639	49.35%	3,570	48.41%	95	1.29%	70	0.95%	69	0.94%	7,374
Barron	8,455	71.98%	3,185	27.12%	71	0.60%	35	0.30%	5,270	44.87%	11,746
Bayfield	3,279	63.41%	1,709	33.05%	49	0.95%	134	2.59%	1,570	30.36%	5,171
Brown	9,371	36.04%	16,465	63.32%	135	0.52%	33	0.13%	-7,094	-27.28%	26,004
Buffalo	3,027	61.88%	1,836	37.53%	11	0.22%	18	0.37%	1,191	24.35%	4,892
Burnett	2,742	74.71%	880	23.98%	31	0.84%	17	0.46%	1,862	50.74%	3,670
Calumet	2,405	38.04%	3,871	61.22%	35	0.55%	12	0.19%	-1,466	-23.19%	6,323
Chippewa	7,514	55.41%	5,985	44.13%	25	0.18%	37	0.27%	1,529	11.27%	13,561
Clark	6,948	62.48%	3,938	35.41%	140	1.26%	95	0.85%	3,010	27.07%	11,121
Columbia	7,615	60.70%	4,819	38.41%	50	0.40%	61	0.49%	2,796	22.29%	12,545
Crawford	3,452	51.18%	3,238	48.01%	19	0.28%	36	0.53%	214	3.17%	6,745
Dane	23,680	54.84%	19,126	44.29%	252	0.58%	126	0.29%	4,554	10.55%	43,184
Dodge	9,660	49.71%	9,536	49.07%	180	0.93%	58	0.30%	124	0.64%	19,434
Door	3,636	59.28%	2,456	40.04%	17	0.28%	25	0.41%	1,180	19.24%	6,134
Douglas	11,280	61.20%	6,762	36.69%	87	0.47%	303	1.64%	4,518	24.51%	18,432
Dunn	7,096	76.51%	2,045	22.05%	52	0.56%	81	0.87%	5,051	54.46%	9,274
Eau Claire	10,079	69.25%	4,385	30.13%	49	0.34%	42	0.29%	5,694	39.12%	14,555
Florence	993	64.27%	540	34.95%	2	0.13%	10	0.65%	453	29.32%	1,545
Fond du Lac	12,593	51.36%	11,719	47.80%	126	0.51%	81	0.33%	874	3.56%	24,519
Forest	1,918	52.82%	1,677	46.19%	13	0.36%	23	0.63%	241	6.64%	3,631
Grant	10,052	59.85%	6,630	39.48%	37	0.22%	75	0.45%	3,422	20.38%	16,794
Green	5,152	64.18%	2,812	35.03%	31	0.39%	32	0.40%	2,340	29.15%	8,027
Green Lake	3,038	53.15%	2,622	45.87%	26	0.45%	30	0.52%	416	7.28%	5,716
Iowa	5,484	63.26%	3,129	36.09%	20	0.23%	36	0.42%	2,355	27.17%	8,669
Iron	1,274	40.68%	1,724	55.04%	16	0.51%	118	3.77%	-450	-14.37%	3,132
Jackson	4,353	75.17%	1,364	23.55%	22	0.38%	52	0.90%	2,989	51.61%	5,791
Jefferson	8,612	57.28%	6,305	41.94%	76	0.51%	41	0.27%	2,307	15.35%	15,034
Juneau	3,777	57.74%	2,708	41.40%	34	0.52%	22	0.34%	1,069	16.34%	6,541
Kenosha	11,330	50.66%	10,638	47.57%	276	1.23%	119	0.53%	692	3.09%	22,363
Kewaunee	1,556	27.94%	3,988	71.61%	11	0.20%	14	0.25%	-2,432	-43.67%	5,569
La Crosse	11,321	55.78%	8,877	43.74%	38	0.19%	59	0.29%	2,444	12.04%	20,295
Lafayette	5,134	58.53%	3,585	40.87%	16	0.18%	36	0.41%	1,549	17.66%	8,771
Langlade	3,715	47.15%	4,078	51.76%	45	0.57%	41	0.52%	-363	-4.61%	7,879
Lincoln	4,025	56.06%	3,091	43.05%	28	0.39%	36	0.50%	934	13.01%	7,180
Manitowoc	7,519	41.70%	10,292	57.08%	172	0.95%	49	0.27%	-2,773	-15.38%	18,032
Marathon	10,127	48.02%	10,675	50.61%	221	1.05%	68	0.32%	-548	-2.60%	21,091
Marinette	6,516	57.04%	4,781	41.85%	96	0.84%	31	0.27%	1,735	15.19%	11,424
Marquette	2,554	65.44%	1,313	33.64%	15	0.38%	21	0.54%	1,241	31.80%	3,903
Milwaukee	82,025	39.77%	110,668	53.66%	12,934	6.27%	610	0.30%	-28,643	-13.89%	206,237
Monroe	5,936	60.83%	3,709	38.01%	59	0.60%	55	0.56%	2,227	22.82%	9,759
Oconto	4,661	51.91%	4,253	47.37%	28	0.31%	37	0.41%	408	4.54%	8,979
Oneida	3,100	54.32%	2,504	43.88%	75	1.31%	28	0.49%	596	10.44%	5,707
Outagamie	12,378	49.58%	12,474	49.96%	65	0.26%	50	0.20%	-96	-0.38%	24,967
Ozaukee	2,338	37.16%	3,864	61.41%	70	1.11%	20	0.32%	-1,526	-24.25%	6,292
Pepin	1,839	58.57%	1,276	40.64%	16	0.51%	9	0.29%	563	17.93%	3,140
Pierce	6,491	67.65%	3,017	31.44%	51	0.53%	36	0.38%	3,474	36.21%	9,595
Polk	6,905	75.14%	2,177	23.69%	76	0.83%	32	0.35%	4,728	51.45%	9,190
Portage	5,161	43.03%	6,764	56.39%	36	0.30%	34	0.28%	-1,603	-13.36%	11,995
Price	3,210	57.92%	2,223	40.11%	48	0.87%	61	1.10%	987	17.81%	5,542
Racine	17,423	56.56%	13,021	42.27%	258	0.84%	104	0.34%	4,402	14.29%	30,806
Richland	5,685	70.87%	2,262	28.20%	32	0.40%	43	0.54%	3,423	42.67%	8,022
Rock	21,497	70.75%	8,726	28.72%	81	0.27%	80	0.26%	12,771	42.03%	30,384
Rusk	3,524	63.62%	1,925	34.75%	51	0.92%	39	0.70%	1,599	28.87%	5,539
Sauk	7,496	58.89%	5,151	40.47%	35	0.27%	47	0.37%	2,345	18.42%	12,729
Sawyer	1,882	61.44%	1,129	36.86%	29	0.95%	23	0.75%	753	24.58%	3,063
Shawano	5,198	57.34%	3,779	41.69%	52	0.57%	36	0.40%	1,419	15.65%	9,065
Sheboygan	12,640	51.17%	11,439	46.31%	535	2.17%	87	0.35%	1,201	4.86%	24,701
St. Croix	6,855	62.16%	4,083	37.02%	56	0.51%	34	0.31%	2,772	25.14%	11,028
Taylor	2,648	54.61%	2,095	43.20%	88	1.81%	18	0.37%	553	11.40%	4,849
Trempealeau	5,596	64.96%	2,963	34.40%	16	0.19%	39	0.45%	2,633	30.57%	8,614
Vernon	6,596	71.28%	2,559	27.65%	35	0.38%	64	0.69%	4,037	43.62%	9,254
Vilas	1,609	58.11%	1,083	39.11%	46	1.66%	31	1.12%	526	19.00%	2,769
Walworth	9,846	69.36%	4,253	29.96%	45	0.32%	52	0.37%	5,593	39.40%	14,196
Washburn	2,898	70.03%	1,192	28.81%	36	0.87%	12	0.29%	1,706	41.23%	4,138
Washington	4,163	41.13%	5,827	57.57%	115	1.14%	17	0.17%	-1,664	-16.44%	10,122
Waukesha	12,218	60.15%	7,846	38.63%	168	0.83%	79	0.39%	4,372	21.53%	20,311
Waupaca	8,928	72.32%	3,307	26.79%	68	0.55%	42	0.34%	5,621	45.53%	12,345
Waushara	4,068	75.42%	1,260	23.36%	34	0.63%	32	0.59%	2,808	52.06%	5,394
Winnebago	16,191	61.10%	9,995	37.72%	201	0.76%	114	0.43%	6,196	23.38%	26,501
Wood	6,655	51.24%	6,167	47.48%	131	1.01%	35	0.27%	488	3.76%	12,988
Totals	544,205	53.52%	450,259	44.28%	18,213	1.79%	4,195	0.41%	93,946	9.24%	1,016,872

==== Counties that flipped from Progressive to Republican ====
- Adams
- Ashland
- Barron
- Bayfield
- Buffalo
- Burnett
- Chippewa
- Clark
- Columbia
- Crawford
- Dane
- Dodge
- Door
- Douglas
- Dunn
- Eau Claire
- Fond du Lac
- Forest
- Grant
- Green
- Green Lake
- Iowa
- Jackson
- Jefferson
- Juneau
- La Crosse
- Lafayette
- Lincoln
- Marquette
- Monroe
- Oconto
- Oneida
- Pierce
- Polk
- Price
- Rusk
- Sauk
- Sawyer
- Shawano
- Sheboygan
- St. Croix
- Taylor
- Trempealeau
- Vernon
- Vilas
- Washburn
- Waupaca
- Waushara
- Wood

==== Counties that flipped from Progressive to Democratic ====
- Brown
- Calumet
- Iron
- Kewaunee
- Langlade
- Manitowoc
- Marathon
- Milwaukee
- Outagamie
- Ozaukee
- Portage
- Washington

=== Electors ===
Starting with this election, voters in Wisconsin no longer chose presidential electors directly. For the 1928 election, Wisconsin adopted the modern "short ballot" whereby one votes for the presidential candidates by name with the understanding that a vote for a candidate is a vote for that party's entire slate of electors. These were the names of the electors for each ticket in 1928.

Herbert Hoover & Charles Curtis Republican Party	Al Smith & Joseph T. Robinson Democratic Party	Norman Thomas & James H. Maurer Social-Democratic Party	William F. Varney & James A. Edgerton Prohibition Party	William Z. Foster & Benjamin Gitlow Workers Party (Note: The Workers ticket had only two electors)	Verne L. Reynolds & Jeremiah D. Crowley Socialist Labor Party (Note: The Socialist Labor ticket had only four electors)
Edward L. Kelley; Frederick H. Clausen; J. J. Phoenix; Robert Caldwell; W. H. Doyle; George S. Meredith; James T. Drought; Charles Hitchcock; Frank Sisson; George W. Mead; Fred Felix Wettengel; Herman T. Lange; Theodore Whiprude	Gertrude Bowler; Nathan Glicksman; Lewis G. Brown; Frank W. Bucklin; John W. McGonigle; August F. Kringle; Max Hottelet; Herman A. Michler; Albert Wolf; Charles Fara; Carl Riggins; Ferris W. White; Henry Wachsmuth Sr.	Victor L. Berger (Note: Had Thomas won the state, Berger would have been disqualified as an elector due to being a sitting member of the United States House of Representatives. However, Berger simultaneously lost reelection in 1928 so he could have subsequently resigned prior to the end of his term to maintain eligibility as a presidential elector.); Daniel W. Hoan; Samuel Sherman; Ada Burow; F. S. Collins; Augusta Melms; Bertha Ramsthal; Edward C. Damrow; Louis T. Zeisler; H. E. Clawson; Lison Watson; Peter Gilles; Charles Kingston	Alexander McEathron; Isaac A. Travis; Alice G. Ford; John Mansfield; Jane H. Robinson; L. A. Willis; John E. Clayton; A. F. Collins; Mrs. L. H. Luhrsen; Ella T. Sanford; John H. Mallock; Otto D. Kahl; Annie P. Kerswill	Joe Polin; Walter Harju	Alice Gradijan; P. J. Pacovsky; Charles Ehrhardt; Angel Angelhoff

== See also ==
- United States presidential elections in Wisconsin
