= 1928 United States presidential election in Indiana =

- November 6, 1928
- Turnout: 74.9% ▲4.2 pp

Nominee	Herbert Hoover	Al Smith
Party	Republican	Democratic
Home state	California	New York
Running mate	Charles Curtis	Joseph T. Robinson
Electoral vote	15	0
Popular vote	848,290	562,691
Percentage	59.68%	39.59%
County results
Hoover
40–50%
50–60%
60–70%
70–80%
Smith
40–50%
50–60%
60–70%
President before election
Calvin Coolidge
Republican
Elected President
Herbert Hoover
Republican

A presidential election was held in Indiana on November 6, 1928, as part of the 1928 United States presidential election. The Republican ticket of the U.S. secretary of commerce Herbert Hoover and the senior U.S. senator from Kansas Charles Curtis defeated the Democratic ticket of the governor of New York Al Smith and the senior U.S. senator from Arkansas Joseph T. Robinson. Hoover defeated Smith in the national election with 444 electoral votes.

Indiana was seen as critical to Smith's chances in the national election; however, by early July, observers predicted that the opposition of the politically powerful Indiana Ku Klux Klan and the Anti-Saloon League would make it impossible for Smith to carry the state. Hoover blamed Democrats and the Federal Reserve System for the interwar farm crisis in a campaign visit to Indiana in late August, but the Indiana Farm Bureau did not endorse either ticket. Smith's Catholicism, opposition to Prohibition, and association with Tammany Hall alienated progressives who branded the candidate as a "patron of gambling and vice." Anti-Catholic dog whistles marked the Republican campaign in Indiana, leading Protestants across denominational lines to vote for Hoover. Hoover's national surrogates warned that Smith would "flood the nation with unsavory immigrants," create an epidemic of alcoholism, and open the path to state socialism. When Smith's train crossed into Indiana, he was greeted by a burning cross visible from the window of his car.

== Background ==
Partisan coalitions in Indiana at the turn of the century reflected the regional, ethnic, and religious roots of the settler population, with the descendants of White Southerners, German Americans, and Irish Americans (especially Catholics) voting reliably Democratic, while Yankees, Nordic and Scandinavian Americans, and British Americans favored the Republican Party. Southern Indiana leaned Democratic and Northern Indiana leaned Republican, in line with the loose correlation between ethnicity and geography. The state's notable concentration of German Catholics contributed to its closeness in presidential elections during the Third Party System relative to other Lower North states. William Jennings Bryan's 1896 presidential campaign saw the state move more securely into the Republican column, as German Catholics alienated by Bryan's outspoken Evangelicalism, conservatives unnerved by the candidate's agrarian radicalism, and urban workers frightened by threats of mass layoffs in the event of a Bryan victory voted Republican for the first time. Following this political realignment, Woodrow Wilson became the only Democrat to carry Indiana during the Fourth Party System (1896–1932) in 1912. Republican support remained greater in urban areas than in rural areas based on the strength of Republican urban political machines.

== Primary elections ==
=== Republican Party ===
Indiana Republican primary, May 7, 1928
Party	Candidate	Votes	%
Republican	James E. Watson	228,795	52.95
Republican	Herbert Hoover	203,279	47.05
Total votes		432,074	100.00

=== Democratic Party ===
Indiana Democratic primary, May 7, 1928
Party	Candidate	Votes	%
Democratic	Evans Woollen	146,934	100.00
Total votes		146,934	100.00

== General election ==
=== Summary ===
Indiana chose 15 electors on a statewide general ticket. State law required voters to elect each member of the Electoral College individually, rather than as a group. This sometimes resulted in small differences in the number of votes cast for electors pledged to the same presidential candidate, if some voters did not vote for all the electors nominated by a party. The following table quotes the official returns published by the secretary of state of Indiana, which list the votes for the first elector on each ticket.

1928 United States presidential election in Indiana
Party	Candidate	Votes	%	±%
Republican	Herbert Hoover Charles Curtis	848,290	59.68	▲4.43
Democratic	Al Smith Joseph T. Robinson	562,691	39.59	▲0.90
Prohibition	William F. Varney James A. Edgerton	5,496	0.39	▲0.04
Socialist	Norman Thomas James H. Maurer	3,871	0.27	▲0.27
Socialist Labor	Verne L. Reynolds Jeremiah D. Crowley	645	0.05	▲0.05
Workers	William Z. Foster Benjamin Gitlow	321	0.02	▼0.06
Total votes		1,421,314	100.00	

=== Results ===
1928 United States presidential election in Indiana
Ticket	Electors for Candidate	Votes
Republican	Arthur Binford	848,290
Republican	Morris Ritchie	841,131
Republican	Frank Gilkison	838,832
Republican	James Boonshot	838,816
Republican	Horace M. Trueblood	838,762
Republican	William A. Guthrie	838,609
Republican	Gail Roberts	838,384
Republican	Benjamin F. Long	838,210
Republican	Bert McKinney	838,145
Republican	William M. Griffin	838,037
Republican	G. Andrew Golden	838,029
Republican	Charles W. Hanley	837,989
Republican	Charles O. Roemler	837,807
Republican	Harvey R. Swisher	837,565
Republican	Oliver M. Kinnison	836,401
Democratic	Meredith Nicholson	562,691
Democratic	Robert W. Miers	561,316
Democratic	George Badger	561,079
Democratic	Lon E. Bernethy	560,758
Democratic	Ephraim K. Strong	560,432
Democratic	Leonard B. Marshall	560,362
Democratic	Samuel E. Rauh	560,308
Democratic	Jacob B. Cunningham	560,264
Democratic	George W. Rauch	560,252
Democratic	Samuel L. Trabue	560,195
Democratic	Charles DeHority	560,183
Democratic	James L. Romack	560,052
Democratic	Michael F. Bohland	559,994
Democratic	A. Clarence Thomas	559,283
Democratic	Frederick Van Nuys	558,154
Prohibition	Basil L. Allen	5,496
Prohibition	Henry S. Bonsib	5,199
Prohibition	Harlen Merrick	5,139
Prohibition	John E. Thompson	5,106
Prohibition	Jennie Brown	5,095
Prohibition	Oliver P. Allen	5,091
Prohibition	William F. Webster	5,090
Prohibition	Ross S. Davis	5,080
Prohibition	Stafford E. Homan	5,077
Prohibition	James Robinette	5,053
Prohibition	Morris Himler	5,042
Prohibition	Margaretha M. Nold	5,004
Prohibition	William Johnson	4,873
Prohibition	William Elliot	4,867
Prohibition	Samuel A. Kiger	4,863
Socialist	Laura A. Allen	3,871
Socialist	Ellsworth B. Mitten	3,713
Socialist	William J. McMillen	3,711
Socialist	Oscar Swiveley	3,708
Socialist	George M. Larrair	3,705
Socialist	Francisco D. Edwards	3,704
Socialist	George G. Tilley	3,702
Socialist	Doneto Ballerini	3,698
Socialist	Silas Woods	3,691
Socialist	Ingersol S. Walker	3,690
Socialist	Gustav Pfoffman	3,680
Socialist	Jacob E. Schrader	3,668
Socialist	Forrest Wallace	3,592
Socialist	Eugene Cooney	3,583
Socialist	Joseph M. Arrington	3,574
Socialist Labor	Alexander Burkhardt	645
Socialist Labor	Roland Stevens	634
Workers	Bertha Garner	321
Workers	Blagoy Philips	314
Total votes		≈1,421,314

=== Results by county ===
1928 United States presidential election in Indiana by county
County	Herbert Hoover Republican		Al Smith Democratic		William F. Varney Prohibition		Norman Thomas Socialist		Others		Margin		Total
County	Votes	Percent	Votes	Percent	Votes	Percent	Votes	Percent	Votes	Percent	Votes	Percent	Total
Adams	4,045	49.70%	4,066	49.96%	22	0.27%	6	0.07%	0	0.00%	-21	-0.26%	8,139
Allen	34,234	56.38%	26,292	43.30%	87	0.14%	64	0.11%	43	0.07%	7,942	13.08%	60,720
Bartholomew	6,788	57.76%	4,881	41.53%	39	0.33%	40	0.34%	4	0.03%	1,907	16.23%	11,752
Benton	3,360	58.37%	2,368	41.14%	18	0.31%	7	0.12%	3	0.05%	992	17.23%	5,756
Blackford	3,882	59.35%	2,576	39.38%	31	0.47%	47	0.72%	5	0.08%	1,306	19.97%	6,541
Boone	6,556	58.81%	4,500	40.37%	73	0.65%	15	0.13%	3	0.03%	2,056	18.44%	11,147
Brown	959	48.51%	999	50.53%	13	0.66%	3	0.15%	3	0.15%	-40	-2.02%	1,977
Carroll	4,780	59.54%	3,182	39.64%	64	0.80%	2	0.02%	0	0.00%	1,598	19.91%	8,028
Cass	10,522	61.31%	6,522	38.00%	68	0.40%	46	0.27%	5	0.03%	4,000	23.31%	17,163
Clark	8,056	56.39%	6,193	43.35%	28	0.20%	8	0.06%	0	0.00%	1,863	13.04%	14,285
Clay	7,103	56.19%	5,358	42.39%	60	0.47%	111	0.88%	9	0.07%	1,745	13.80%	12,641
Clinton	7,606	55.89%	5,895	43.31%	95	0.70%	13	0.10%	1	0.01%	1,711	12.57%	13,610
Crawford	2,672	57.39%	1,933	41.52%	33	0.71%	17	0.37%	1	0.02%	739	15.87%	4,656
Daviess	7,116	56.73%	5,324	42.45%	24	0.19%	74	0.59%	5	0.04%	1,792	14.29%	12,543
Dearborn	6,334	58.49%	4,459	41.18%	22	0.20%	12	0.11%	2	0.02%	1,875	17.31%	10,829
Decatur	5,400	58.40%	3,791	41.00%	36	0.39%	15	0.16%	4	0.04%	1,609	17.40%	9,246
DeKalb	7,373	64.04%	4,077	35.41%	52	0.45%	12	0.10%	0	0.00%	3,296	28.63%	11,514
Delaware	19,102	68.79%	8,532	30.72%	72	0.26%	54	0.19%	10	0.04%	10,570	38.06%	27,770
Dubois	3,301	35.18%	6,044	64.41%	15	0.16%	17	0.18%	7	0.07%	-2,743	-29.23%	9,384
Elkhart	20,876	74.76%	6,900	24.71%	71	0.25%	62	0.22%	15	0.05%	13,976	50.05%	27,924
Fayette	5,874	62.63%	3,455	36.84%	29	0.31%	18	0.19%	3	0.03%	2,419	25.79%	9,379
Floyd	10,471	58.49%	7,327	40.93%	51	0.28%	42	0.23%	11	0.06%	3,144	17.56%	17,902
Fountain	4,960	55.60%	3,894	43.65%	43	0.48%	23	0.26%	1	0.01%	1,066	11.95%	8,921
Franklin	3,426	47.19%	3,817	52.58%	11	0.15%	5	0.07%	1	0.01%	-391	-5.39%	7,260
Fulton	4,627	61.09%	2,881	38.04%	62	0.82%	4	0.05%	0	0.00%	1,746	23.05%	7,574
Gibson	8,137	57.07%	5,882	41.25%	123	0.86%	99	0.69%	18	0.13%	2,255	15.81%	14,259
Grant	14,659	65.98%	7,273	32.74%	123	0.55%	146	0.66%	15	0.07%	7,386	33.25%	22,216
Greene	8,262	57.81%	5,761	40.31%	70	0.49%	172	1.20%	26	0.18%	2,501	17.50%	14,291
Hamilton	7,690	67.60%	3,611	31.75%	70	0.62%	4	0.04%	0	0.00%	4,079	35.86%	11,375
Hancock	4,788	56.49%	3,626	42.78%	51	0.60%	10	0.12%	1	0.01%	1,162	13.71%	8,476
Harrison	4,440	54.43%	3,664	44.91%	39	0.48%	11	0.13%	4	0.05%	776	9.51%	8,158
Hendricks	5,954	64.79%	3,181	34.61%	40	0.44%	13	0.14%	2	0.02%	2,773	30.17%	9,190
Henry	10,502	68.53%	4,554	29.72%	224	1.46%	41	0.27%	3	0.02%	5,948	38.81%	15,324
Howard	12,632	66.89%	5,930	31.40%	205	1.09%	106	0.56%	12	0.06%	6,702	35.49%	18,885
Huntington	8,323	58.88%	5,678	40.17%	85	0.60%	42	0.30%	8	0.06%	2,645	18.71%	14,136
Jackson	5,151	49.78%	5,130	49.58%	48	0.46%	15	0.14%	3	0.03%	21	0.20%	10,347
Jasper	3,700	65.65%	1,915	33.98%	19	0.34%	1	0.02%	1	0.02%	1,785	31.67%	5,636
Jay	5,998	55.31%	4,759	43.89%	74	0.68%	9	0.08%	4	0.04%	1,239	11.43%	10,844
Jefferson	5,295	57.24%	3,906	42.22%	40	0.43%	8	0.09%	2	0.02%	1,389	15.01%	9,251
Jennings	3,705	60.76%	2,369	38.85%	20	0.33%	3	0.05%	1	0.02%	1,336	21.91%	6,098
Johnson	5,513	54.30%	4,548	44.80%	76	0.75%	14	0.14%	1	0.01%	965	9.51%	10,152
Knox	10,035	49.92%	9,837	48.93%	69	0.34%	144	0.72%	19	0.09%	198	0.98%	20,104
Kosciusko	7,973	63.18%	4,537	35.95%	82	0.65%	20	0.16%	8	0.06%	3,436	27.23%	12,620
LaGrange	3,171	64.40%	1,720	34.93%	27	0.55%	3	0.06%	3	0.06%	1,451	29.47%	4,924
Lake	48,768	59.68%	32,321	39.55%	179	0.22%	242	0.30%	209	0.26%	16,447	20.13%	81,719
LaPorte	14,763	61.32%	9,254	38.44%	25	0.10%	25	0.10%	8	0.03%	5,509	22.88%	24,075
Lawrence	9,844	68.70%	4,428	30.90%	33	0.23%	22	0.15%	2	0.01%	5,416	37.80%	14,329
Madison	23,083	64.45%	12,496	34.89%	124	0.35%	104	0.29%	7	0.02%	10,587	29.56%	35,814
Marion	109,630	59.55%	73,309	39.82%	457	0.25%	479	0.26%	225	0.12%	36,321	19.73%	184,100
Marshall	6,738	60.24%	4,377	39.13%	60	0.54%	10	0.09%	0	0.00%	2,361	21.11%	11,185
Martin	2,450	51.88%	2,245	47.54%	11	0.23%	16	0.34%	0	0.00%	205	4.34%	4,722
Miami	8,318	59.19%	5,592	39.80%	100	0.71%	36	0.26%	6	0.04%	2,726	19.40%	14,052
Monroe	8,883	67.00%	4,317	32.56%	36	0.27%	23	0.17%	0	0.00%	4,566	34.44%	13,259
Montgomery	8,863	63.69%	4,960	35.64%	72	0.52%	20	0.14%	0	0.00%	3,903	28.05%	13,915
Morgan	5,464	57.76%	3,933	41.58%	39	0.41%	21	0.22%	3	0.03%	1,531	16.18%	9,460
Newton	3,053	64.48%	1,649	34.83%	21	0.44%	10	0.21%	2	0.04%	1,404	29.65%	4,735
Noble	6,338	59.76%	4,207	39.67%	42	0.40%	17	0.16%	1	0.01%	2,131	20.09%	10,605
Ohio	1,230	57.10%	911	42.29%	12	0.56%	1	0.05%	0	0.00%	319	14.81%	2,154
Orange	5,086	61.77%	3,112	37.79%	20	0.24%	10	0.12%	6	0.07%	1,974	23.97%	8,234
Owen	3,036	55.03%	2,420	43.86%	32	0.58%	28	0.51%	1	0.02%	616	11.17%	5,517
Parke	4,729	59.25%	3,165	39.66%	39	0.49%	47	0.59%	1	0.01%	1,564	19.60%	7,981
Perry	3,772	49.89%	3,782	50.02%	2	0.03%	5	0.07%	0	0.00%	-10	-0.13%	7,561
Pike	4,190	54.61%	3,409	44.43%	32	0.42%	36	0.47%	6	0.08%	781	10.18%	7,673
Porter	7,107	70.44%	2,921	28.95%	26	0.26%	32	0.32%	4	0.04%	4,186	41.49%	10,090
Posey	4,396	51.80%	4,052	47.74%	22	0.26%	14	0.16%	3	0.04%	344	4.05%	8,487
Pulaski	2,738	56.43%	2,040	42.04%	68	1.40%	6	0.12%	0	0.00%	698	14.39%	4,852
Putnam	5,351	55.72%	4,177	43.50%	24	0.25%	43	0.45%	8	0.08%	1,174	12.23%	9,603
Randolph	8,368	71.32%	3,264	27.82%	93	0.79%	7	0.06%	1	0.01%	5,104	43.50%	11,733
Ripley	5,059	53.39%	4,387	46.30%	12	0.13%	15	0.16%	3	0.03%	672	7.09%	9,476
Rush	6,640	68.38%	2,996	30.85%	68	0.70%	7	0.07%	0	0.00%	3,644	37.52%	9,711
Scott	1,719	52.68%	1,527	46.80%	15	0.46%	2	0.06%	0	0.00%	192	5.88%	3,263
Shelby	7,516	56.14%	5,790	43.24%	70	0.52%	11	0.08%	2	0.01%	1,726	12.89%	13,389
Spencer	4,672	52.83%	4,152	46.95%	15	0.17%	2	0.02%	3	0.03%	520	5.88%	8,844
St. Joseph	36,844	57.56%	26,846	41.94%	169	0.26%	106	0.17%	41	0.06%	9,998	15.62%	64,006
Starke	2,759	57.32%	2,016	41.89%	12	0.25%	23	0.48%	3	0.06%	743	15.44%	4,813
Steuben	4,435	71.35%	1,730	27.83%	41	0.66%	9	0.14%	1	0.02%	2,705	43.52%	6,216
Sullivan	6,199	51.09%	5,642	46.50%	79	0.65%	184	1.52%	30	0.25%	557	4.59%	12,134
Switzerland	2,617	58.62%	1,805	40.43%	39	0.87%	3	0.07%	0	0.00%	812	18.19%	4,464
Tippecanoe	15,165	63.25%	8,720	36.37%	59	0.25%	28	0.12%	6	0.03%	6,445	26.88%	23,978
Tipton	4,774	59.30%	3,186	39.58%	74	0.92%	14	0.17%	2	0.02%	1,588	19.73%	8,050
Union	2,101	65.99%	1,069	33.57%	13	0.41%	1	0.03%	0	0.00%	1,032	32.41%	3,184
Vanderburgh	29,067	59.44%	19,646	40.17%	90	0.18%	62	0.13%	40	0.08%	9,421	19.26%	48,905
Vermillion	5,192	51.41%	4,793	47.46%	31	0.31%	75	0.74%	9	0.09%	399	3.95%	10,100
Vigo	22,962	54.71%	18,509	44.10%	95	0.23%	360	0.86%	42	0.10%	4,453	10.61%	41,968
Wabash	8,537	68.25%	3,872	30.96%	68	0.54%	25	0.20%	6	0.05%	4,665	37.30%	12,508
Warren	2,644	68.57%	1,188	30.81%	12	0.31%	10	0.26%	2	0.05%	1,456	37.76%	3,856
Warrick	4,603	54.12%	3,744	44.02%	138	1.62%	15	0.18%	5	0.06%	859	10.10%	8,505
Washington	3,835	51.96%	3,518	47.66%	19	0.26%	9	0.12%	0	0.00%	317	4.29%	7,381
Wayne	15,936	67.52%	7,547	31.98%	59	0.25%	56	0.24%	3	0.01%	8,389	35.55%	23,601
Wells	4,142	48.93%	4,246	50.16%	66	0.78%	8	0.09%	3	0.04%	-104	-1.23%	8,465
White	4,534	60.01%	2,980	39.44%	28	0.37%	13	0.17%	1	0.01%	1,554	20.57%	7,556
Whitley	4,519	57.43%	3,294	41.86%	51	0.65%	2	0.03%	3	0.04%	1,225	15.57%	7,869
TOTAL	848,290	59.68%	562,691	39.59%	5,496	0.39%	3,871	0.27%	966	0.07%	285,599	20.09%	1,421,314

== See also ==
- United States presidential elections in Indiana

== Bibliography ==
- Congressional Quarterly (1985). Congressional Quarterly's Guide to U.S. Elections (2nd ed.). Washington D.C.: Congressional Quarterly. ISBN 978-0-87187-339-2.
- Gause, Fred C.; Spencer, William W., eds. (1928). Election Law of Indiana with Instructions to Voters and Election Officers. Fort Wayne: State Board of Election Commissioners.
- Indiana (1929). Year Book of the State of Indiana for the Year 1928. Indianapolis: Legislative Reference Bureau.
- Lichtman, Allan J. (1979). Prejudice and the Old Politics: The Presidential Election of 1928. Chapel Hill: University of North Carolina Press.
- Madison, James H. (1986). The Indiana Way: A State History. Bloomington: Indiana University Press.
- Madison, James H. (2020). The Ku Klux Klan in the Heartland. Bloomington: Indiana University Press.
- Petersen, Svend (1963). A Statistical History of the American Presidential Elections. New York: Frederick Ungar Publishing Company. LCCN 62-21786.
- Phillips, Kevin P. (1969). The Emerging Republican Majority. New Rochelle, NY: Arlington House. LCCN 76-79602.
