= 1928 United States presidential election in Iowa =

- November 6, 1928

Nominee	Herbert Hoover	Al Smith
Party	Republican	Democratic
Home state	California	New York
Running mate	Charles Curtis	Joseph T. Robinson
Electoral vote	13	0
Popular vote	623,570	379,311
Percentage	61.77%	37.57%
County results
Hoover
50–60%
60–70%
70–80%
Smith
50–60%
60–70%
President before election
Calvin Coolidge
Republican
Elected President
Herbert Hoover
Republican

The 1928 United States presidential election in Iowa took place on November 6, 1928. All contemporary 48 states were part of the 1928 United States presidential election. Voters chose 13 electors to the Electoral College, which selected the president and vice president.

Iowa was won by Republican former Secretary of Commerce Herbert Hoover of California (actually an Iowan by birth) who was running against Democratic Governor of New York Alfred E. Smith. Hoover's running mate was Senate Majority Leader Charles Curtis of Kansas, while Smith's running mate was Senator Joseph Taylor Robinson of Arkansas. Hoover won Iowa by a margin of 24.20 percent.

== Results ==
Presidential Candidate	Running Mate	Party	Electoral Vote (EV)	Popular Vote (PV)	
Herbert Hoover	Charles Curtis	Republican	13	623,570	61.77%
Al Smith	Joseph T. Robinson	Democratic	0	379,311	37.57%
Frank Webb	Will Vereen	Farmer-Labor	0	3,088 (Note: Votes for candidates other than the Republican and Democratic were not separated by county but listed only as a state-wide total. They are included in the statewide total at the bottom of the county table.)	0.31%
Norman Thomas	James Maurer	Socialist	0	2,960	0.29%
William Z. Foster	Benjamin Gitlow	Communist	0	328	0.03%
Verne L. Reynolds	Jeremiah Crowley	Socialist Labor	0	230	0.02%
—	—	Write-ins	0	2	0.00%

=== Results by county ===
County	Herbert Clark Hoover Republican		Alfred Emmanuel Smith Democratic		Margin		Total votes cast
County	#	%	#	%	#	%	Total votes cast
Adair	4,176	69.25%	1,854	30.75%	2,322	38.51%	6,030
Adams	2,958	66.67%	1,479	33.33%	1,479	33.33%	4,437
Allamakee	4,785	59.72%	3,227	40.28%	1,558	19.45%	8,012
Appanoose	6,864	67.27%	3,340	32.73%	3,524	34.54%	10,204
Audubon	2,340	49.74%	2,364	50.26%	-24	-0.51%	4,704
Benton	5,669	63.16%	3,307	36.84%	2,362	26.31%	8,976
Black Hawk	19,409	69.63%	8,467	30.37%	10,942	39.25%	27,876
Boone	7,521	71.15%	3,049	28.85%	4,472	42.31%	10,570
Bremer	3,879	55.22%	3,146	44.78%	733	10.43%	7,025
Buchanan	5,885	65.51%	3,099	34.49%	2,786	31.01%	8,984
Buena Vista	5,087	66.10%	2,609	33.90%	2,478	32.20%	7,696
Butler	4,789	71.85%	1,876	28.15%	2,913	43.71%	6,665
Calhoun	4,136	60.67%	2,681	39.33%	1,455	21.34%	6,817
Carroll	4,014	39.55%	6,134	60.45%	-2,120	-20.89%	10,148
Cass	6,120	69.86%	2,640	30.14%	3,480	39.73%	8,760
Cedar	4,856	65.86%	2,517	34.14%	2,339	31.72%	7,373
Cerro Gordo	9,582	66.13%	4,908	33.87%	4,674	32.26%	14,490
Cherokee	3,909	59.14%	2,701	40.86%	1,208	18.28%	6,610
Chickasaw	3,712	50.32%	3,665	49.68%	47	0.64%	7,377
Clarke	2,780	62.87%	1,642	37.13%	1,138	25.73%	4,422
Clay	3,986	65.88%	2,064	34.12%	1,922	31.77%	6,050
Clayton	6,774	61.55%	4,231	38.45%	2,543	23.11%	11,005
Clinton	12,295	58.72%	8,643	41.28%	3,652	17.44%	20,938
Crawford	3,436	43.32%	4,495	56.68%	-1,059	-13.35%	7,931
Dallas	7,294	70.12%	3,108	29.88%	4,186	40.24%	10,402
Davis	3,097	54.76%	2,559	45.24%	538	9.51%	5,656
Decatur	3,942	59.57%	2,675	40.43%	1,267	19.15%	6,617
Delaware	5,390	57.75%	3,943	42.25%	1,447	15.50%	9,333
Des Moines	10,547	65.41%	5,578	34.59%	4,969	30.82%	16,125
Dickinson	3,045	70.88%	1,251	29.12%	1,794	41.76%	4,296
Dubuque	9,744	33.39%	19,437	66.61%	-9,693	-33.22%	29,181
Emmet	3,218	70.11%	1,372	29.89%	1,846	40.22%	4,590
Fayette	8,338	67.25%	4,061	32.75%	4,277	34.49%	12,399
Floyd	5,674	73.23%	2,074	26.77%	3,600	46.46%	7,748
Franklin	3,424	66.98%	1,688	33.02%	1,736	33.96%	5,112
Fremont	3,597	56.04%	2,822	43.96%	775	12.07%	6,419
Greene	4,299	68.17%	2,007	31.83%	2,292	36.35%	6,306
Grundy	3,671	69.38%	1,620	30.62%	2,051	38.76%	5,291
Guthrie	4,772	68.10%	2,235	31.90%	2,537	36.21%	7,007
Hamilton	4,171	58.37%	2,975	41.63%	1,196	16.74%	7,146
Hancock	3,114	61.70%	1,933	38.30%	1,181	23.40%	5,047
Hardin	5,781	70.90%	2,373	29.10%	3,408	41.80%	8,154
Harrison	5,605	55.99%	4,406	44.01%	1,199	11.98%	10,011
Henry	5,160	71.54%	2,053	28.46%	3,107	43.08%	7,213
Howard	3,375	51.39%	3,193	48.61%	182	2.77%	6,568
Humboldt	2,828	62.75%	1,679	37.25%	1,149	25.49%	4,507
Ida	2,486	53.37%	2,172	46.63%	314	6.74%	4,658
Iowa	4,091	57.09%	3,075	42.91%	1,016	14.18%	7,166
Jackson	4,740	55.97%	3,729	44.03%	1,011	11.94%	8,469
Jasper	9,144	70.33%	3,857	29.67%	5,287	40.67%	13,001
Jefferson	4,919	69.50%	2,159	30.50%	2,760	38.99%	7,078
Johnson	7,288	50.37%	7,181	49.63%	107	0.74%	14,469
Jones	5,090	63.10%	2,976	36.90%	2,114	26.21%	8,066
Keokuk	5,304	58.44%	3,772	41.56%	1,532	16.88%	9,076
Kossuth	4,878	50.74%	4,736	49.26%	142	1.48%	9,614
Lee	11,645	59.93%	7,785	40.07%	3,860	19.87%	19,430
Linn	25,452	68.48%	11,715	31.52%	13,737	36.96%	37,167
Louisa	3,275	69.21%	1,457	30.79%	1,818	38.42%	4,732
Lucas	3,811	66.87%	1,888	33.13%	1,923	33.74%	5,699
Lyon	3,170	66.01%	1,632	33.99%	1,538	32.03%	4,802
Madison	4,364	66.71%	2,178	33.29%	2,186	33.41%	6,542
Mahaska	7,368	69.72%	3,200	30.28%	4,168	39.44%	10,568
Marion	6,225	60.21%	4,113	39.79%	2,112	20.43%	10,338
Marshall	9,326	73.38%	3,384	26.62%	5,942	46.75%	12,710
Mills	3,429	61.14%	2,179	38.86%	1,250	22.29%	5,608
Mitchell	3,534	60.49%	2,308	39.51%	1,226	20.99%	5,842
Monona	3,745	56.91%	2,836	43.09%	909	13.81%	6,581
Monroe	4,060	59.02%	2,819	40.98%	1,241	18.04%	6,879
Montgomery	5,155	71.26%	2,079	28.74%	3,076	42.52%	7,234
Muscatine	8,604	67.97%	4,055	32.03%	4,549	35.93%	12,659
O'Brien	4,845	66.90%	2,397	33.10%	2,448	33.80%	7,242
Osceola	2,085	57.09%	1,567	42.91%	518	14.18%	3,652
Page	7,181	74.35%	2,478	25.65%	4,703	48.69%	9,659
Palo Alto	3,463	54.92%	2,843	45.08%	620	9.83%	6,306
Plymouth	4,848	49.15%	5,015	50.85%	-167	-1.69%	9,863
Pocahontas	3,322	54.05%	2,824	45.95%	498	8.10%	6,146
Polk	42,290	68.19%	19,725	31.81%	22,565	36.39%	62,015
Pottawattamie	14,354	59.17%	9,905	40.83%	4,449	18.34%	24,259
Poweshiek	5,212	65.16%	2,787	34.84%	2,425	30.32%	7,999
Ringgold	3,674	70.03%	1,572	29.97%	2,102	40.07%	5,246
Sac	4,461	64.89%	2,414	35.11%	2,047	29.77%	6,875
Scott	16,974	56.74%	12,942	43.26%	4,032	13.48%	29,916
Shelby	3,459	48.97%	3,604	51.03%	-145	-2.05%	7,063
Sioux	6,378	69.20%	2,839	30.80%	3,539	38.40%	9,217
Story	9,035	76.90%	2,714	23.10%	6,321	53.80%	11,749
Tama	5,589	53.81%	4,798	46.19%	791	7.62%	10,387
Taylor	4,700	69.38%	2,074	30.62%	2,626	38.77%	6,774
Union	5,432	67.20%	2,651	32.80%	2,781	34.41%	8,083
Van Buren	3,904	66.76%	1,944	33.24%	1,960	33.52%	5,848
Wapello	11,586	66.67%	5,793	33.33%	5,793	33.33%	17,379
Warren	5,294	70.28%	2,239	29.72%	3,055	40.55%	7,533
Washington	5,948	68.35%	2,754	31.65%	3,194	36.70%	8,702
Wayne	3,911	60.26%	2,579	39.74%	1,332	20.52%	6,490
Webster	8,525	56.75%	6,497	43.25%	2,028	13.50%	15,022
Winnebago	3,386	72.75%	1,268	27.25%	2,118	45.51%	4,654
Winneshiek	5,084	52.85%	4,535	47.15%	549	5.71%	9,619
Woodbury	20,587	53.59%	17,831	46.41%	2,756	7.17%	38,418
Worth	2,921	69.04%	1,310	30.96%	1,611	38.08%	4,231
Wright	5,020	66.34%	2,547	33.66%	2,473	32.68%	7,567
Totals	623,570	61.79%	379,011	37.56%	244,559	24.23%	1,009,189 (Note: This total includes all minor parties that were not separated by county.)

== See also ==
- United States presidential elections in Iowa
