= 1928 United States presidential election in Kentucky =

- November 6, 1928

Nominee	Herbert Hoover	Al Smith
Party	Republican	Democratic
Home state	California	New York
Running mate	Charles Curtis	Joseph T. Robinson
Electoral vote	13	0
Popular vote	558,734	381,070
Percentage	59.36%	40.48%
County results
Hoover
50–60%
60–70%
70–80%
80–90%
90–100%
Smith
50–60%
60–70%
70–80%
President before election
Calvin Coolidge
Republican
Elected President
Herbert Hoover
Republican

The 1928 United States presidential election in Kentucky took place on November 6, 1928, as part of the 1928 United States presidential election. Voters chose 13 representatives, or electors to the Electoral College, who voted for president and vice president.

Ever since the Civil War, Kentucky had been shaped politically by divisions created by that war between secessionist, Democratic counties and Unionist, Republican ones, although the state as a whole leaned Democratic throughout this era, and the GOP only ever, between the 1856 and 1924 elections, carried the state in 1896 and 1924 for William McKinley and Calvin Coolidge respectively, and it would not be won by the GOP again until Ike Eisenhower won the state in 1956 for his own second term.

In 1928, as in all of the upland South, Kentucky's extremely stable Civil War partisan political pattern would become significantly disturbed due to the nomination, after all other prominent Democrats sat the election out due to the prevailing prosperity, of urban, anti-Prohibition Catholic Al Smith. Once Smith was nominated – despite his attempt to dispel fears by nominating "dry" Southern Democrat Joseph T. Robinson as his running mate – extreme fear ensued in the South, which had no experience of the Southern and Eastern European Catholic immigrants who were Smith's local constituency. Southern fundamentalist Protestants believed that Smith would allow papal and priestly leadership in the United States, which Protestantism was a reaction against. In the east of the state where many communities were becoming sundown towns or counties it was believed that Smith was unacceptable also because the Catholic Church officially opposed social and political segregation of the races.

As with the former Confederate states, opposition to Smith in Kentucky was organised by the Protestant churches, led by James Cannon Jr. and Arthur J. Barton. A major state paper, The Western Recorder had been heavily opposing Smith for over a year before the campaign began. When the campaign did begin, Smith's religion was the overwhelming concern, and at the beginning of October it appeared as though Republican nominee Herbert Hoover was likely to carry the state. Although later in October there were thoughts Smith would challenge the GOP nominee, in the end Hoover won the state by a margin of 18.88 percent against Al Smith gaining all thirteen of the state's electors as a result. Traditional Democratic loyalties were maintained best in the Jackson Purchase, where racial issues were of greatest importance and there was opposition from memories of the 1927 Mississippi flood to Hoover's record on flood relief.

Hoover became the first Republican nominee to ever win Kentucky with a majority of the vote or to exceed his national vote share in the state, with Kentucky voting 1.40 points more Republican than the nation at-large. This, in combination with Calvin Coolidge's victory in the state four years prior, also marked the first time that Kentucky voted Republican in consecutive elections. He was the solitary Republican presidential candidate to carry Menifee County until George W. Bush in 2000, and also the first ever Republican victor in the following counties: Anderson, Barren, Boone, Bullitt, Daviess, Grant, Hardin, LaRue, Livingston, Mason, McCracken, McLean, Montgomery, Nicholas, Oldham, Powell, Robertson, Scott, Shelby and Spencer.

This was the last time Kentucky voted Republican until Dwight Eisenhower won the state in his re-election bid in 1956.

== Results ==
1928 United States presidential election in Kentucky
Party	Candidate	Running mate	Popular vote		Electoral vote	
Party	Candidate	Running mate	Count	%	Count	%
Republican	Herbert Hoover of California	Charles Curtis of Kansas	558,734	59.36%	13	100.00%
Democratic	Al Smith of New York	Joseph Taylor Robinson of Arkansas	381,070	40.48%	0	0.00%
Socialist	Norman Thomas of New York	James Maurer of Pennsylvania	837	0.09%	0	0.00%
Socialist Labor	Verne L. Reynolds of Michigan	Jeremiah D. Crowley of New York	340	0.04%	0	0.00%
Communist	William Z. Foster of Massachusetts	Benjamin Gitlow of New York	293	0.03%	0	0.00%
Total			941,274	100.00%	13	100.00%

=== Results by county ===
1928 United States presidential election in Kentucky by county
County	Herbert Clark Hoover Republican		Alfred Emmanuel Smith Democratic		Various candidates Other parties		Margin		Total votes cast
County	#	%	#	%	#	%	#	%	Total votes cast
Adair	3,856	69.01%	1,732	30.99%	0	0.00%	2,124	38.01%	5,588
Allen	4,253	73.14%	1,562	26.86%	0	0.00%	2,691	46.28%	5,815
Anderson	1,859	51.96%	1,718	48.02%	1	0.03%	141	3.94%	3,578
Ballard	940	24.49%	2,896	75.44%	3	0.08%	-1,956	-50.95%	3,839
Barren	5,101	59.07%	3,530	40.88%	5	0.06%	1,571	18.19%	8,636
Bath	2,223	54.74%	1,830	45.06%	8	0.20%	393	9.68%	4,061
Bell	6,570	71.84%	2,551	27.90%	24	0.26%	4,019	43.95%	9,145
Boone	2,604	58.31%	1,855	41.54%	7	0.16%	749	16.77%	4,466
Bourbon	4,512	58.34%	3,218	41.61%	4	0.05%	1,294	16.73%	7,734
Boyd	9,118	66.38%	4,611	33.57%	7	0.05%	4,507	32.81%	13,736
Boyle	3,517	54.01%	2,992	45.95%	3	0.05%	525	8.06%	6,512
Bracken	2,820	69.98%	1,201	29.80%	9	0.22%	1,619	40.17%	4,030
Breathitt	2,309	43.35%	3,017	56.65%	0	0.00%	-708	-13.29%	5,326
Breckinridge	4,783	61.53%	2,987	38.43%	3	0.04%	1,796	23.11%	7,773
Bullitt	1,793	50.45%	1,758	49.47%	3	0.08%	35	0.98%	3,554
Butler	3,272	82.56%	684	17.26%	7	0.18%	2,588	65.30%	3,963
Caldwell	2,855	62.61%	1,695	37.17%	10	0.22%	1,160	25.44%	4,560
Calloway	1,557	31.13%	3,431	68.59%	14	0.28%	-1,874	-37.47%	5,002
Campbell	17,317	54.25%	14,508	45.45%	95	0.30%	2,809	8.80%	31,920
Carlisle	787	28.28%	1,994	71.65%	2	0.07%	-1,207	-43.37%	2,783
Carroll	1,649	46.91%	1,863	53.00%	3	0.09%	-214	-6.09%	3,515
Carter	5,342	68.73%	2,392	30.77%	39	0.50%	2,950	37.95%	7,773
Casey	3,805	71.39%	1,519	28.50%	6	0.11%	2,286	42.89%	5,330
Christian	7,069	55.35%	5,702	44.65%	0	0.00%	1,367	10.70%	12,771
Clark	3,495	50.25%	3,460	49.75%	0	0.00%	35	0.50%	6,955
Clay	4,439	86.97%	651	12.75%	14	0.27%	3,788	74.22%	5,104
Clinton	2,580	88.81%	325	11.19%	0	0.00%	2,255	77.62%	2,905
Crittenden	3,000	68.46%	1,376	31.40%	6	0.14%	1,624	37.06%	4,382
Cumberland	2,593	82.79%	538	17.18%	1	0.03%	2,055	65.61%	3,132
Daviess	8,896	54.77%	7,332	45.14%	15	0.09%	1,564	9.63%	16,243
Edmonson	3,104	74.15%	1,076	25.70%	6	0.14%	2,028	48.45%	4,186
Elliott	601	31.33%	1,317	68.67%	0	0.00%	-716	-37.33%	1,918
Estill	3,641	65.82%	1,886	34.09%	5	0.09%	1,755	31.72%	5,532
Fayette	16,988	65.11%	9,065	34.74%	39	0.15%	7,923	30.37%	26,092
Fleming	3,798	64.50%	2,086	35.43%	4	0.07%	1,712	29.08%	5,888
Floyd	5,109	47.17%	5,721	52.83%	0	0.00%	-612	-5.65%	10,830
Franklin	3,485	47.45%	3,853	52.46%	7	0.10%	-368	-5.01%	7,345
Fulton	1,366	30.34%	3,132	69.55%	5	0.11%	-1,766	-39.22%	4,503
Gallatin	1,010	55.04%	823	44.85%	2	0.11%	187	10.19%	1,835
Garrard	2,862	62.34%	1,729	37.66%	0	0.00%	1,133	24.68%	4,591
Grant	2,448	59.48%	1,662	40.38%	6	0.15%	786	19.10%	4,116
Graves	3,223	33.98%	6,237	65.76%	24	0.25%	-3,014	-31.78%	9,484
Grayson	3,937	63.07%	2,295	36.77%	10	0.16%	1,642	26.31%	6,242
Green	2,824	68.95%	1,272	31.05%	0	0.00%	1,552	37.89%	4,096
Greenup	4,410	64.43%	2,435	35.57%	0	0.00%	1,975	28.85%	6,845
Hancock	1,614	58.33%	1,151	41.60%	2	0.07%	463	16.73%	2,767
Hardin	4,624	58.92%	3,210	40.90%	14	0.18%	1,414	18.02%	7,848
Harlan	12,251	75.41%	3,958	24.36%	37	0.23%	8,293	51.05%	16,246
Harrison	2,909	47.86%	3,164	52.06%	5	0.08%	-255	-4.20%	6,078
Hart	3,480	59.66%	2,339	40.10%	14	0.24%	1,141	19.56%	5,833
Henderson	5,443	57.03%	4,068	42.62%	33	0.35%	1,375	14.41%	9,544
Henry	2,334	44.29%	2,929	55.58%	7	0.13%	-595	-11.29%	5,270
Hickman	767	26.12%	2,163	73.67%	6	0.20%	-1,396	-47.55%	2,936
Hopkins	6,330	48.69%	6,640	51.08%	30	0.23%	-310	-2.38%	13,000
Jackson	3,552	96.52%	123	3.34%	5	0.14%	3,429	93.18%	3,680
Jefferson	97,803	60.14%	64,472	39.65%	338	0.21%	33,331	20.50%	162,613
Jessamine	2,857	55.45%	2,295	44.55%	0	0.00%	562	10.91%	5,152
Johnson	5,339	73.98%	1,869	25.90%	9	0.12%	3,470	48.08%	7,217
Kenton	21,043	53.67%	18,165	46.33%	0	0.00%	2,878	7.34%	39,208
Knott	1,004	26.24%	2,822	73.76%	0	0.00%	-1,818	-47.52%	3,826
Knox	5,928	79.76%	1,497	20.14%	7	0.09%	4,431	59.62%	7,432
Larue	1,892	52.19%	1,727	47.64%	6	0.17%	165	4.55%	3,625
Laurel	4,906	81.06%	1,141	18.85%	5	0.08%	3,765	62.21%	6,052
Lawrence	3,277	59.59%	2,217	40.32%	5	0.09%	1,060	19.28%	5,499
Lee	2,005	63.91%	1,131	36.05%	1	0.03%	874	27.86%	3,137
Leslie	2,806	94.51%	159	5.36%	4	0.13%	2,647	89.15%	2,969
Letcher	5,400	60.55%	3,502	39.27%	16	0.18%	1,898	21.28%	8,918
Lewis	4,077	78.36%	1,120	21.53%	6	0.12%	2,957	56.83%	5,203
Lincoln	3,903	62.68%	2,314	37.16%	10	0.16%	1,589	25.52%	6,227
Livingston	1,767	59.12%	1,217	40.72%	5	0.17%	550	18.40%	2,989
Logan	4,858	55.79%	3,843	44.13%	7	0.08%	1,015	11.66%	8,708
Lyon	1,215	48.43%	1,286	51.26%	8	0.32%	-71	-2.83%	2,509
Madison	6,325	57.03%	4,736	42.71%	29	0.26%	1,589	14.33%	11,090
Magoffin	2,816	60.93%	1,806	39.07%	0	0.00%	1,010	21.85%	4,622
Marion	2,395	40.85%	3,461	59.03%	7	0.12%	-1,066	-18.18%	5,863
Marshall	1,879	47.87%	2,036	51.87%	10	0.25%	-157	-4.00%	3,925
Martin	1,674	80.44%	404	19.41%	3	0.14%	1,270	61.03%	2,081
Mason	5,012	59.79%	3,364	40.13%	6	0.07%	1,648	19.66%	8,382
McCracken	7,368	56.93%	5,535	42.76%	40	0.31%	1,833	14.16%	12,943
McCreary	3,622	89.10%	435	10.70%	8	0.20%	3,187	78.40%	4,065
McLean	2,408	58.07%	1,728	41.67%	11	0.27%	680	16.40%	4,147
Meade	1,610	48.54%	1,700	51.25%	7	0.21%	-90	-2.71%	3,317
Menifee	732	50.24%	725	49.76%	0	0.00%	7	0.48%	1,457
Mercer	3,462	61.76%	2,140	38.17%	4	0.07%	1,322	23.58%	5,606
Metcalfe	2,314	66.92%	1,144	33.08%	0	0.00%	1,170	33.83%	3,458
Monroe	3,127	78.59%	843	21.19%	9	0.23%	2,284	57.40%	3,979
Montgomery	2,742	58.35%	1,938	41.24%	19	0.40%	804	17.11%	4,699
Morgan	2,025	44.02%	2,575	55.98%	0	0.00%	-550	-11.96%	4,600
Muhlenberg	6,651	56.22%	5,130	43.36%	49	0.41%	1,521	12.86%	11,830
Nelson	2,926	42.04%	4,031	57.92%	3	0.04%	-1,105	-15.88%	6,960
Nicholas	1,867	50.36%	1,836	49.53%	4	0.11%	31	0.84%	3,707
Ohio	5,690	66.83%	2,784	32.70%	40	0.47%	2,906	34.13%	8,514
Oldham	1,604	54.02%	1,359	45.77%	6	0.20%	245	8.25%	2,969
Owen	1,573	38.04%	2,552	61.72%	10	0.24%	-979	-23.68%	4,135
Owsley	2,107	89.55%	241	10.24%	5	0.21%	1,866	79.30%	2,353
Pendleton	3,196	67.03%	1,567	32.86%	5	0.10%	1,629	34.17%	4,768
Perry	6,099	61.44%	3,814	38.42%	14	0.14%	2,285	23.02%	9,927
Pike	9,386	54.14%	7,930	45.75%	19	0.11%	1,456	8.40%	17,335
Powell	1,160	61.31%	732	38.69%	0	0.00%	428	22.62%	1,892
Pulaski	9,348	78.84%	2,494	21.03%	15	0.13%	6,854	57.81%	11,857
Robertson	742	53.69%	640	46.31%	0	0.00%	102	7.38%	1,382
Rockcastle	3,858	80.95%	908	19.05%	0	0.00%	2,950	61.90%	4,766
Rowan	1,857	61.25%	1,170	38.59%	5	0.16%	687	22.66%	3,032
Russell	3,028	78.45%	823	21.32%	9	0.23%	2,205	57.12%	3,860
Scott	3,192	52.82%	2,843	47.05%	8	0.13%	349	5.78%	6,043
Shelby	3,933	54.89%	3,232	45.11%	0	0.00%	701	9.78%	7,165
Simpson	1,635	39.64%	2,490	60.36%	0	0.00%	-855	-20.73%	4,125
Spencer	1,565	62.20%	947	37.64%	4	0.16%	618	24.56%	2,516
Taylor	3,149	65.05%	1,684	34.79%	8	0.17%	1,465	30.26%	4,841
Todd	2,496	50.78%	2,416	49.16%	3	0.06%	80	1.63%	4,915
Trigg	2,346	53.55%	2,031	46.36%	4	0.09%	315	7.19%	4,381
Trimble	573	30.21%	1,317	69.43%	7	0.37%	-744	-39.22%	1,897
Union	2,350	37.64%	3,884	62.21%	9	0.14%	-1,534	-24.57%	6,243
Warren	7,931	60.90%	5,092	39.10%	1	0.01%	2,839	21.80%	13,024
Washington	2,933	56.36%	2,266	43.54%	5	0.10%	667	12.82%	5,204
Wayne	2,907	64.00%	1,635	36.00%	0	0.00%	1,272	28.01%	4,542
Webster	3,527	49.49%	3,591	50.39%	9	0.13%	-64	-0.90%	7,127
Whitley	8,060	83.26%	1,610	16.63%	10	0.10%	6,450	66.63%	9,680
Wolfe	1,270	48.36%	1,356	51.64%	0	0.00%	-86	-3.27%	2,626
Woodford	2,490	54.71%	2,056	45.18%	5	0.11%	434	9.54%	4,551
Totals	558,064	59.34%	381,070	40.52%	1,387	0.15%	176,994	18.82%	940,521
