= 1924 United States presidential election in Maryland =

- November 4, 1924

Nominee	Calvin Coolidge	John W. Davis	Robert M. La Follette
Party	Republican	Democratic	Progressive
Home state	Massachusetts	West Virginia	Wisconsin
Running mate	Charles G. Dawes	Charles W. Bryan	Burton K. Wheeler
Electoral vote	8	0	0
Popular vote	162,414	148,072	47,157
Percentage	45.29%	41.29%	13.15%
County results
Coolidge
40–50%
50–60%
60–70%
Davis
40–50%
50–60%
60–70%
President before election
Calvin Coolidge
Republican
Elected President
Calvin Coolidge
Republican

The 1924 United States presidential election in Maryland took place on November 4, 1924. All contemporary 48 states were part of the 1924 United States presidential election. State voters chose 8 electors to the Electoral College, which selected the president and vice president.

Maryland was won by the Republican nominee, incumbent President Calvin Coolidge of Massachusetts, over the Democratic nominee, Ambassador John W. Davis of West Virginia. Coolidge ran with former Budget Director Charles G. Dawes of Illinois, while Davis ran with Governor Charles W. Bryan of Nebraska. Also in the running that year was the Progressive Party nominee, Senator Robert M. La Follette of Wisconsin and his running mate Senator Burton K. Wheeler of Montana.

In this election, Maryland voted 21.22% more Democratic than the nation at large, or an 8 percent bigger differential than in 1920.

== Results ==
Presidential Candidate	Running Mate	Party	Electoral Vote (EV)	Popular Vote (PV)	
Calvin Coolidge of Massachusetts	Charles G. Dawes	Republican	8	162,414	45.29%
John W. Davis	Charles W. Bryan	Democratic	0	148,072	41.29%
Robert M. La Follette	Burton K. Wheeler	Progressive	0	47,157	13.15%
Frank Tetes Johns	Verne L. Reynolds	Labor	0	987	0.28%

=== Results by county ===
County	Calvin Coolidge Republican		John W. Davis Democratic		Robert M. La Follette Sr. Progressive		Frank T. Johns Labor		Margin		Total votes cast
County	#	%	#	%	#	%	#	%	#	%	Total votes cast
Allegany	9,042	55.24%	4,442	27.14%	2,822	17.24%	64	0.39%	4,600	28.10%	16,370
Anne Arundel	3,670	44.46%	3,766	45.62%	758	9.18%	61	0.74%	-96	-1.16%	8,255
Baltimore	9,383	43.32%	9,424	43.51%	2,824	13.04%	30	0.14%	-41	-0.19%	21,661
Baltimore City	69,588	42.63%	60,222	36.89%	32,958	20.19%	484	0.30%	9,366	5.74%	163,252
Calvert	1,564	54.06%	1,242	42.93%	84	2.90%	3	0.10%	322	11.13%	2,893
Caroline	2,210	45.21%	2,493	51.00%	165	3.38%	20	0.41%	-283	-5.79%	4,888
Carroll	5,301	51.65%	4,616	44.98%	320	3.12%	26	0.25%	685	6.67%	10,263
Cecil	3,156	50.37%	2,863	45.69%	213	3.40%	34	0.54%	293	4.68%	6,266
Charles	2,215	56.59%	1,491	38.09%	177	4.52%	31	0.79%	724	18.50%	3,914
Dorchester	3,356	50.76%	3,047	46.08%	203	3.07%	6	0.09%	309	4.67%	6,612
Frederick	8,441	49.35%	7,740	45.25%	903	5.28%	22	0.13%	701	4.10%	17,106
Garrett	2,594	61.79%	1,226	29.20%	373	8.89%	5	0.12%	1,368	32.59%	4,198
Harford	3,545	45.69%	3,841	49.51%	355	4.58%	17	0.22%	-296	-3.82%	7,758
Howard	1,989	38.48%	2,786	53.90%	382	7.39%	12	0.23%	-797	-15.42%	5,169
Kent	2,019	42.51%	2,628	55.34%	94	1.98%	8	0.17%	-609	-12.82%	4,749
Montgomery	5,675	44.01%	6,639	51.49%	557	4.32%	23	0.18%	-964	-7.48%	12,894
Prince George's	5,868	46.98%	5,088	40.74%	1,477	11.83%	57	0.46%	780	6.24%	12,490
Queen Anne's	1,656	33.74%	3,155	64.28%	82	1.67%	15	0.31%	-1,499	-30.54%	4,908
St. Mary's	1,653	44.64%	1,949	52.63%	93	2.51%	8	0.22%	-296	-7.99%	3,703
Somerset	3,230	51.19%	2,903	46.01%	152	2.41%	25	0.40%	327	5.18%	6,310
Talbot	2,451	44.66%	2,859	52.10%	176	3.21%	2	0.04%	-408	-7.43%	5,488
Washington	7,460	54.21%	4,620	33.57%	1,654	12.02%	28	0.20%	2,840	20.64%	13,762
Wicomico	2,604	43.82%	3,068	51.62%	269	4.53%	2	0.03%	-464	-7.81%	5,943
Worcester	3,744	38.29%	5,964	60.99%	66	0.67%	4	0.04%	-2,220	-22.70%	9,778
Totals	162,414	45.29%	148,072	41.29%	47,157	13.15%	987	0.28%	14,342	4.00%	358,630

==== Counties that flipped from Republican to Democratic ====
- Anne Arundel
- Baltimore (County)
- Harford
- Howard
- St. Mary's

==== Counties that flipped from Democratic to Republican ====
- Cecil

== See also ==
- United States presidential elections in Maryland
- 1924 United States presidential election
- 1924 United States elections
