= 1940 Prohibition National Convention =

- 1940 presidential election

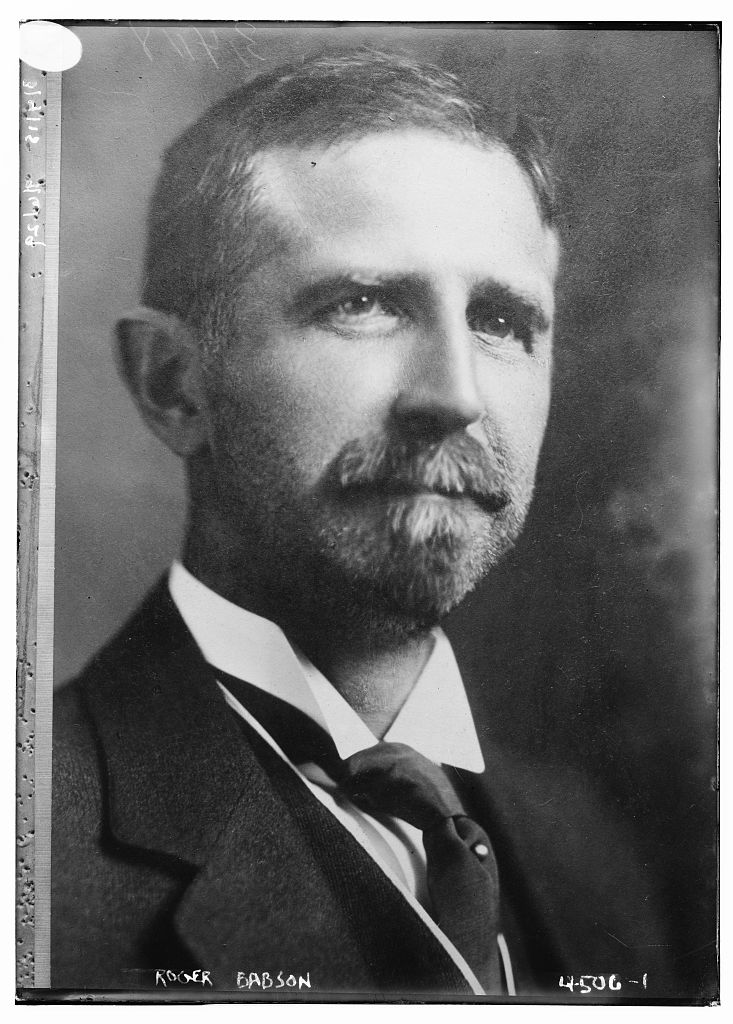
- Presidential nominee (Babson)

Convention
- Dates: May 8–10
- City: Chicago, Illinois
- Venue: La Salle Hotel
- Chair: D. Leigh Colvin of New York
- Keynote speaker: Claude A. Watson of California

Candidates
- Presidential nominee: Roger Babson of Massachusetts
- Vice-presidential nominee: Edgar V. Moorman of Illinois

Voting
- Total delegates: 400+ (attending); 230 (voted on nominations)
- Ballots: 1

The 1940 Prohibition National Convention was held May 8–10, 1940, at the La Salle Hotel in Chicago, Illinois. It saw noted economist and columnist Roger Babson for president, and industrialist Edgar V. Moorman nominated for vice president.

== Logistics ==
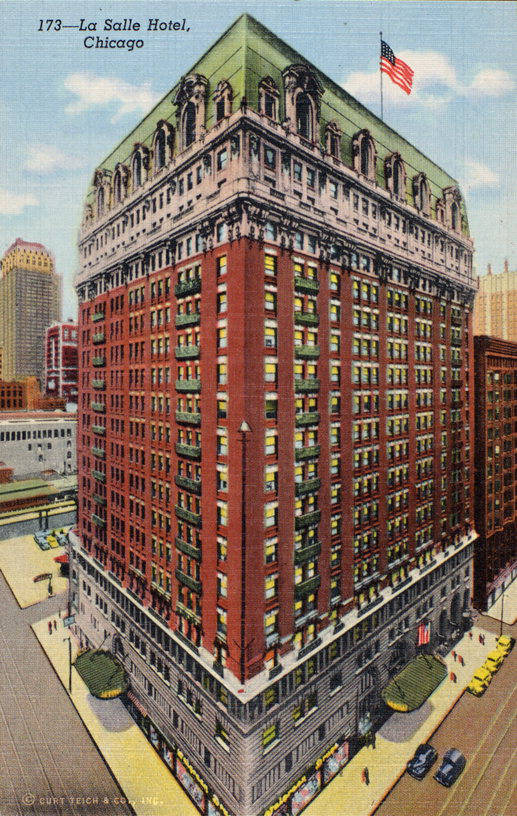
Postcard of the La Salle Hotel, location of the convention

The convention was held May 8–10, 1940, at the La Salle Hotel in Chicago, Illinois. The same hotel had previous been the location of the 1928 Prohibition National Convention. At the time, Chicago was the location of the national party offices. Their party offices were located in the city from 1933 through 1947.

Chicago had been the city of the founding meeting of the Prohibition Party in 1869. The party had recently met in Chicago on September 2, 1939, for a seventieth anniversary commemoration of its founding.

The convention had more the 400 delegates. The opening session was attended by 350 delegates representing 32 states. Only 230 of these delegates (from 32 states) participated in the nominating votes. D. Leigh Colvin served as permanent chairman of the convention.

== Nominations ==
The nominees for the 1940 presidential election were selected in the closing session of the convention.

=== Presidential nomination ===
Roger Babson went unopposed for the nomination, and delegates nominated him unanimously.

Babson was a respected economist well known for having predicted the Wall Street crash of 1929. He was one of the most widely-known individuals that the party had nominated for president, being the author of a widely syndicated weekly columnist. His prominence leant legitimacy to the declining political party, and his nomination was well-covered in the press. Reflecting on the credence that Babson's stature brought, one Ohio newspaper wrote, "The Prohibition Party is not dead yet. It must have life left in it if Roger Babson, the veteran business statistician, takes it up."

Babson was previously a lifelong Republican until two years prior. He joined the Prohibition Party in 1939, during the event commemorating the seventieth anniversary of the party's founding. He framed his venture into politics with the Prohibition Party as a crusade "to help save the nation". In addition to being new to the party, he was also new to the temperance cause itself.

Babson made his aspirations for the Prohibition presidential nomination know in advance of the convention, and spoke of his personal hope that he could garner more than 1 million votes as its nominee. When speaking about it to Christian Science Monitor weeks before the convention, he remarked,

I hope that we may obtain a million votes, This will be enough to demonstrate to one, or possibly both, of the major parties that the nation demands more attention to the spiritual values, more honesty, more righteous leadership, more attention to the virtues, more placing of principle above expediency…. We will make an issue of it, [as, unless one of the two major parties change,]there will inevitably arise a third party more powerful than all the rest.

During the convention vote, Babson's name was presented by George L. Thompson, the chairman of the state committee of the Massachusetts state party.

=== Vice presidential nomination ===
For Vice president, the convention nominated Edgar V. Moorman by acclamation after three other vice presidential contenders withdrew.

Prior to withdrawals, those running for the vice presidential nomination were:

- Claude A. Watson of California, the convention's keynote speaker and 1936 vice presidential nominee
- Enoch A. Holtwick of Illinois, professor of Greenville College
- Edgar V. Moorman of Illinois, Moorman Manufacturing Company president
- Samuel N. Morris of Texas, radio personality

Moorman was a wealthy Quincy, Illinois, manufacturer of livestock feed. While the Moorman Manufacturing Company was successful, Moorman himself held little general renown. Similar to Babson, Moorman was relatively new to the party and the temperance cause. He had previously been a Democrat. The New York Times described Moorman ad a lay evangelist".

== Keynote address by Claude A. Watson ==
The keynote speaker of the convention was Claude A. Watson. In his keynote on May 8, Watson declared, "a free government cannot be considered a success unless it continually strengthens the moral energy and the political honesty and independence of its citizens." He called for the uniting of, "church people and independents" with the Prohibition Party, arguing that neither of the major parties (the Democrats and Republicans) could offer solutions the problems being faced. He attacked incumbent Democratic president Franklin Delano Roosevelt and his New Deal programs for raising the national debt, and opined that the New Deal had forced American into a, "system of paternalism and subsidy" that could cause a financial collapse of America. He blamed the New Deal for creating a class struggle and argued that it also stymied private sector expansion and job creation.

== Platform ==
The convention adopted a platform authored by Babson. The platform was adopted on May 9. Babson's platform framed alcohol as one of many "spiritual evils" that ne,eded to be combatted, with Babson centering his campaign on fostering a "spiritual revival". The platform centered on the "need of a spiritual awakening", included an array of social and economic policies.

== Election of party officers ==
Party officer elections were held at the convention. Edward E. Blake of Illinois was elected to a third term as chairman of the party's national committee. Others election to national committee offices included William F. Varney of New York as vice chairman; Hugh A. White of Michigan as secretary, and Will D. Martin of New Jersey as treasurer.
