= 1924 United States presidential election in Missouri =

- November 4, 1924

Nominee	Calvin Coolidge	John W. Davis	Robert M. La Follette
Party	Republican	Democratic	Socialist
Alliance			Progressive
Home state	Massachusetts	West Virginia	Wisconsin
Running mate	Charles G. Dawes	Charles W. Bryan	Burton K. Wheeler
Electoral vote	18	0	0
Popular vote	648,486	572,753	84,160
Percentage	49.58%	43.79%	6.43%
County results
Coolidge
40–50%
50–60%
60–70%
70–80%
Davis
40–50%
50–60%
60–70%
80–90%
President before election
Calvin Coolidge
Republican
Elected President
Calvin Coolidge
Republican

The 1924 United States presidential election in Missouri took place on November 4, 1924, as part of the 1924 United States presidential election. Voters chose 18 representatives, or electors, to the Electoral College, who voted for president and vice president.

Calvin Coolidge narrowly won Missouri by 5.79 points against John W. Davis, winning all 18 of the electoral votes in the state. To date, this is the last time that the city of St. Louis voted for the Republican candidate in a presidential election.

== Results ==
1924 United States presidential election in Missouri
Party	Candidate	Votes	%
Republican	Calvin Coolidge (incumbent)	648,486	49.58%
Democratic	John W. Davis	572,753	43.79%
Socialist	Robert M. La Follette	84,160	6.43%
Prohibition	Herman P. Faris	1,418	0.11%
Socialist Labor	Frank Tetes Johns	883	0.07%
Commonwealth Land	William Wallace	258	0.02%
Total votes		1,306,817	100%

=== Results by county ===
1924 United States presidential election in Missouri by county
County	John Calvin Coolidge Republican		John William Davis Democratic		Robert M. La Follette, Sr. Socialist/Progressive		Various candidates Other parties		Margin		Total votes cast
County	#	%	#	%	#	%	#	%	#	%	Total votes cast
Adair	4,383	53.56%	2,800	34.22%	970	11.85%	30	0.37%	1,583	19.34%	8,183
Andrew	3,535	55.36%	2,648	41.47%	188	2.94%	14	0.22%	887	13.89%	6,385
Atchison	2,710	49.26%	2,617	47.57%	170	3.09%	4	0.07%	93	1.69%	5,501
Audrain	3,125	34.18%	5,866	64.17%	142	1.55%	9	0.10%	-2,741	-29.98%	9,142
Barry	4,065	47.93%	3,606	42.52%	797	9.40%	13	0.15%	459	5.41%	8,481
Barton	2,952	48.59%	2,682	44.15%	419	6.90%	22	0.36%	270	4.44%	6,075
Bates	4,552	47.11%	4,722	48.87%	357	3.69%	32	0.33%	-170	-1.76%	9,663
Benton	2,693	60.71%	1,588	35.80%	70	1.58%	85	1.92%	1,105	24.91%	4,436
Bollinger	2,204	50.21%	2,075	47.27%	110	2.51%	1	0.02%	129	2.94%	4,390
Boone	3,547	28.67%	8,657	69.97%	157	1.27%	12	0.10%	-5,110	-41.30%	12,373
Buchanan	17,509	50.13%	14,759	42.26%	2,599	7.44%	59	0.17%	2,750	7.87%	34,926
Butler	4,489	55.98%	2,953	36.83%	565	7.05%	12	0.15%	1,536	19.15%	8,019
Caldwell	3,545	58.66%	2,383	39.43%	100	1.65%	15	0.25%	1,162	19.23%	6,043
Callaway	2,799	31.68%	5,904	66.82%	126	1.43%	7	0.08%	-3,105	-35.14%	8,836
Camden	1,732	57.14%	1,196	39.46%	100	3.30%	3	0.10%	536	17.68%	3,031
Cape Girardeau	6,076	52.08%	4,967	42.58%	609	5.22%	14	0.12%	1,109	9.51%	11,666
Carroll	4,907	51.05%	4,502	46.83%	182	1.89%	22	0.23%	405	4.21%	9,613
Carter	772	40.57%	1,051	55.23%	68	3.57%	12	0.63%	-279	-14.66%	1,903
Cass	3,610	42.17%	4,709	55.01%	225	2.63%	17	0.20%	-1,099	-12.84%	8,561
Cedar	2,802	55.83%	2,007	39.99%	203	4.04%	7	0.14%	795	15.84%	5,019
Chariton	3,173	38.72%	4,795	58.52%	213	2.60%	13	0.16%	-1,622	-19.79%	8,194
Christian	2,692	62.77%	1,281	29.87%	303	7.06%	13	0.30%	1,411	32.90%	4,289
Clark	2,948	50.37%	2,770	47.33%	62	1.06%	73	1.25%	178	3.04%	5,853
Clay	2,998	31.69%	6,076	64.24%	372	3.93%	13	0.14%	-3,078	-32.54%	9,459
Clinton	2,848	46.22%	3,177	51.56%	128	2.08%	9	0.15%	-329	-5.34%	6,162
Cole	6,205	52.49%	5,033	42.58%	578	4.89%	5	0.04%	1,172	9.91%	11,821
Cooper	4,755	52.76%	4,070	45.16%	183	2.03%	4	0.04%	685	7.60%	9,012
Crawford	2,336	55.77%	1,697	40.51%	149	3.56%	7	0.17%	639	15.25%	4,189
Dade	2,651	54.66%	2,007	41.38%	178	3.67%	14	0.29%	644	13.28%	4,850
Dallas	2,188	61.03%	1,304	36.37%	92	2.57%	1	0.03%	884	24.66%	3,585
Daviess	3,869	51.42%	3,520	46.78%	126	1.67%	9	0.12%	349	4.64%	7,524
DeKalb	2,730	52.58%	2,368	45.61%	85	1.64%	9	0.17%	362	6.97%	5,192
Dent	1,779	42.84%	2,263	54.49%	109	2.62%	2	0.05%	-484	-11.65%	4,153
Douglas	2,617	69.16%	909	24.02%	247	6.53%	11	0.29%	1,708	45.14%	3,784
Dunklin	3,436	42.67%	4,357	54.11%	253	3.14%	6	0.07%	-921	-11.44%	8,052
Franklin	6,253	59.31%	3,384	32.10%	896	8.50%	10	0.09%	2,869	27.21%	10,543
Gasconade	3,306	75.88%	577	13.24%	470	10.79%	4	0.09%	2,729	62.63%	4,357
Gentry	3,318	45.94%	3,555	49.22%	340	4.71%	9	0.12%	-237	-3.28%	7,222
Greene	13,618	45.74%	13,084	43.95%	3,017	10.13%	52	0.17%	534	1.79%	29,771
Grundy	3,782	50.65%	2,367	31.70%	1,308	17.52%	10	0.13%	1,415	18.95%	7,467
Harrison	4,247	58.18%	2,792	38.25%	234	3.21%	27	0.37%	1,455	19.93%	7,300
Henry	4,616	46.76%	4,706	47.68%	342	3.46%	207	2.10%	-90	-0.91%	9,871
Hickory	1,895	70.71%	722	26.94%	56	2.09%	7	0.26%	1,173	43.77%	2,680
Holt	3,316	57.98%	2,255	39.43%	130	2.27%	18	0.31%	1,061	18.55%	5,719
Howard	1,873	27.30%	4,759	69.37%	219	3.19%	9	0.13%	-2,886	-42.07%	6,860
Howell	3,130	48.21%	2,681	41.29%	663	10.21%	19	0.29%	449	6.92%	6,493
Iron	1,328	43.24%	1,675	54.54%	63	2.05%	5	0.16%	-347	-11.30%	3,071
Jackson	91,141	51.79%	76,002	43.19%	8,604	4.89%	235	0.13%	15,139	8.60%	175,982
Jasper	13,701	55.11%	9,176	36.91%	1,893	7.61%	90	0.36%	4,525	18.20%	24,860
Jefferson	4,870	48.88%	4,356	43.72%	729	7.32%	8	0.08%	514	5.16%	9,963
Johnson	5,248	47.68%	5,526	50.21%	213	1.94%	19	0.17%	-278	-2.53%	11,006
Knox	2,288	43.83%	2,722	52.15%	194	3.72%	16	0.31%	-434	-8.31%	5,220
Laclede	2,960	51.61%	2,500	43.59%	265	4.62%	10	0.17%	460	8.02%	5,735
Lafayette	6,517	50.43%	5,877	45.48%	519	4.02%	10	0.08%	640	4.95%	12,923
Lawrence	4,499	49.35%	3,768	41.33%	818	8.97%	31	0.34%	731	8.02%	9,116
Lewis	2,416	39.48%	3,481	56.88%	211	3.45%	12	0.20%	-1,065	-17.40%	6,120
Lincoln	2,563	41.63%	3,419	55.53%	168	2.73%	7	0.11%	-856	-13.90%	6,157
Linn	5,155	45.84%	5,386	47.89%	674	5.99%	31	0.28%	-231	-2.05%	11,246
Livingston	4,517	50.26%	4,316	48.02%	106	1.18%	49	0.55%	201	2.24%	8,988
Macon	4,909	44.83%	5,538	50.58%	484	4.42%	19	0.17%	-629	-5.74%	10,950
Madison	1,569	48.06%	1,665	51.00%	29	0.89%	2	0.06%	-96	-2.94%	3,265
Maries	1,004	33.00%	1,913	62.89%	122	4.01%	3	0.10%	-909	-29.88%	3,042
Marion	5,408	43.98%	5,739	46.67%	1,135	9.23%	15	0.12%	-331	-2.69%	12,297
McDonald	2,374	48.29%	2,301	46.81%	153	3.11%	88	1.79%	73	1.48%	4,916
Mercer	2,508	62.54%	1,209	30.15%	285	7.11%	8	0.20%	1,299	32.39%	4,010
Miller	3,011	56.16%	1,962	36.60%	383	7.14%	5	0.09%	1,049	19.57%	5,361
Mississippi	1,797	41.69%	2,360	54.76%	139	3.23%	14	0.32%	-563	-13.06%	4,310
Moniteau	3,138	53.17%	2,601	44.07%	153	2.59%	10	0.17%	537	9.10%	5,902
Monroe	1,141	16.51%	5,597	81.00%	166	2.40%	6	0.09%	-4,456	-64.49%	6,910
Montgomery	3,563	53.60%	2,938	44.19%	134	2.02%	13	0.20%	625	9.40%	6,648
Morgan	2,489	56.61%	1,842	41.89%	62	1.41%	4	0.09%	647	14.71%	4,397
New Madrid	4,018	48.34%	4,167	50.13%	125	1.50%	2	0.02%	-149	-1.79%	8,312
Newton	4,592	50.96%	3,970	44.06%	417	4.63%	32	0.36%	622	6.90%	9,011
Nodaway	6,242	49.85%	5,803	46.35%	451	3.60%	25	0.20%	439	3.51%	12,521
Oregon	896	25.70%	2,231	63.98%	354	10.15%	6	0.17%	-1,335	-38.29%	3,487
Osage	2,496	51.98%	1,986	41.36%	313	6.52%	7	0.15%	510	10.62%	4,802
Ozark	1,758	69.05%	688	27.02%	93	3.65%	7	0.27%	1,070	42.03%	2,546
Pemiscot	4,811	45.50%	5,616	53.12%	125	1.18%	21	0.20%	-805	-7.61%	10,573
Perry	7,280	47.78%	6,568	43.11%	1,369	8.99%	19	0.12%	712	4.67%	15,236
Pettis	2,656	55.67%	1,826	38.27%	282	5.91%	7	0.15%	830	17.40%	4,771
Phelps	2,085	37.91%	2,918	53.05%	475	8.64%	22	0.40%	-833	-15.15%	5,500
Pike	3,715	46.44%	4,040	50.51%	233	2.91%	11	0.14%	-325	-4.06%	7,999
Platte	1,999	34.80%	3,674	63.96%	71	1.24%	0	0.00%	-1,675	-29.16%	5,744
Polk	4,097	56.19%	3,033	41.60%	148	2.03%	13	0.18%	1,064	14.59%	7,291
Pulaski	1,578	40.81%	2,127	55.00%	162	4.19%	0	0.00%	-549	-14.20%	3,867
Putnam	3,340	65.39%	1,495	29.27%	260	5.09%	13	0.25%	1,845	36.12%	5,108
Ralls	1,365	33.52%	2,617	64.27%	83	2.04%	7	0.17%	-1,252	-30.75%	4,072
Randolph	2,991	25.85%	7,372	63.72%	1,186	10.25%	20	0.17%	-4,381	-37.87%	11,569
Ray	2,753	34.24%	4,989	62.04%	293	3.64%	6	0.07%	-2,236	-27.81%	8,041
Reynolds	873	32.05%	1,822	66.89%	28	1.03%	1	0.04%	-949	-34.84%	2,724
Ripley	1,428	41.71%	1,863	54.41%	129	3.77%	4	0.12%	-435	-12.70%	3,424
Saint Charles	4,668	59.11%	2,364	29.94%	850	10.76%	15	0.19%	2,304	29.18%	7,897
Saint Clair	2,907	49.70%	2,640	45.14%	278	4.75%	24	0.41%	267	4.56%	5,849
Saint Francois	6,117	51.16%	5,542	46.35%	287	2.40%	10	0.08%	575	4.81%	11,956
Saint Louis County	26,669	55.75%	16,075	33.61%	4,997	10.45%	93	0.19%	10,594	22.15%	47,834
Saint Louis City	139,433	52.70%	95,888	36.24%	28,856	10.91%	420	0.16%	43,545	16.46%	264,597
Sainte Genevieve	1,330	49.20%	1,257	46.50%	113	4.18%	3	0.11%	73	2.70%	2,703
Saline	4,990	41.15%	6,564	54.14%	553	4.56%	18	0.15%	-1,574	-12.98%	12,125
Schuyler	1,522	42.37%	1,982	55.18%	75	2.09%	13	0.36%	-460	-12.81%	3,592
Scotland	2,282	44.82%	2,595	50.96%	210	4.12%	5	0.10%	-313	-6.15%	5,092
Scott	3,335	40.54%	3,633	44.16%	1,215	14.77%	43	0.52%	-298	-3.62%	8,226
Shannon	1,174	34.38%	2,107	61.70%	133	3.89%	1	0.03%	-933	-27.32%	3,415
Shelby	1,737	30.01%	3,957	68.37%	88	1.52%	6	0.10%	-2,220	-38.36%	5,788
Stoddard	3,844	44.29%	4,348	50.09%	477	5.50%	11	0.13%	-504	-5.81%	8,680
Stone	1,871	65.42%	626	21.89%	352	12.31%	11	0.38%	1,245	43.53%	2,860
Sullivan	3,885	49.33%	3,703	47.02%	285	3.62%	2	0.03%	182	2.31%	7,875
Taney	1,710	61.49%	981	35.28%	83	2.98%	7	0.25%	729	26.21%	2,781
Texas	2,787	43.55%	3,421	53.45%	181	2.83%	11	0.17%	-634	-9.91%	6,400
Vernon	3,593	38.89%	4,839	52.38%	769	8.32%	38	0.41%	-1,246	-13.49%	9,239
Warren	2,667	76.03%	644	18.36%	196	5.59%	1	0.03%	2,023	57.67%	3,508
Washington	2,397	54.42%	1,955	44.38%	50	1.14%	3	0.07%	442	10.03%	4,405
Wayne	1,958	44.11%	2,283	51.43%	187	4.21%	11	0.25%	-325	-7.32%	4,439
Webster	3,168	51.12%	2,730	44.05%	291	4.70%	8	0.13%	438	7.07%	6,197
Worth	1,666	49.66%	1,650	49.18%	30	0.89%	9	0.27%	16	0.48%	3,355
Wright	3,105	55.04%	2,303	40.83%	231	4.10%	2	0.04%	802	14.22%	5,641
Totals	648,486	49.58%	572,753	43.79%	84,160	6.43%	2,559	0.20%	75,733	5.79%	1,307,958

== See also ==
- United States presidential elections in Missouri
