= La Salle Hotel =

Hotel in Chicago, Illinois (1909–1976)

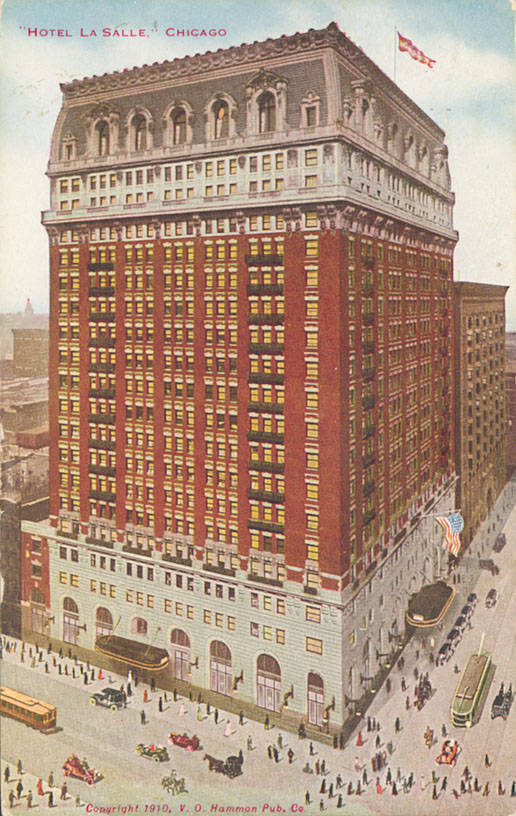
- La Salle Hotel

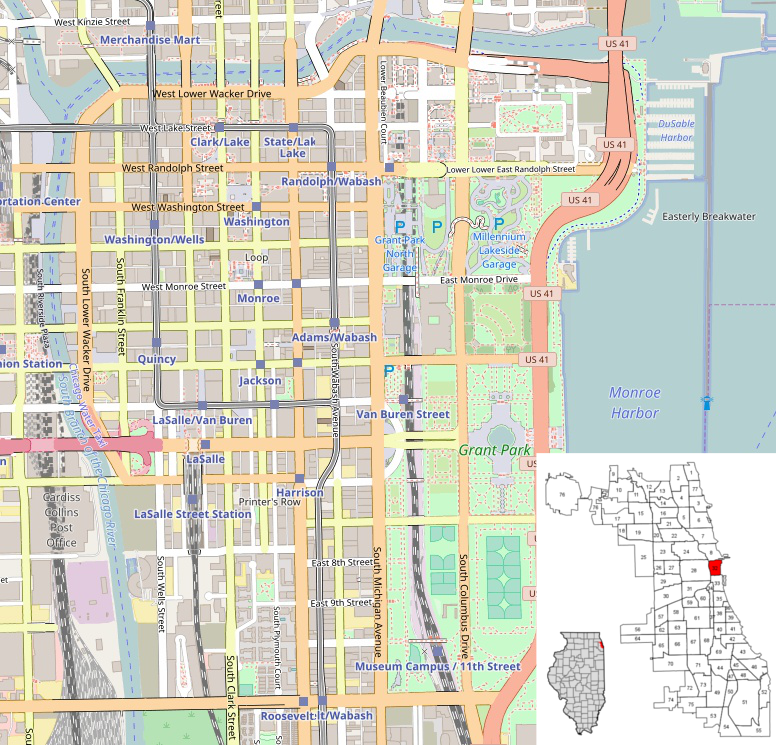
- Location

General information
- Location: La Salle Street, Chicago, Illinois, United States
- Coordinates: 41°52′55″N 87°37′57″W
- Construction started: 1908
- Construction stopped: 1909
- Renovated: 1946–1947
- Demolished: 1976
- Operator: Ernest J. Stevens

Technical details
- Floor count: 22

Design and construction
- Architect: Holabird & Roche
- Developer: Purdy & Henderson

The La Salle Hotel was a historic hotel located on the northwest corner of La Salle Street and Madison Street in the Chicago Loop community area of Chicago, Illinois, United States. It was designed by Holabird & Roche and opened in 1909. After a major fire in 1946, the hotel was refurbished and reopened in 1947. It closed in 1976 and was demolished for construction of an office building.

== History ==
=== Early years ===
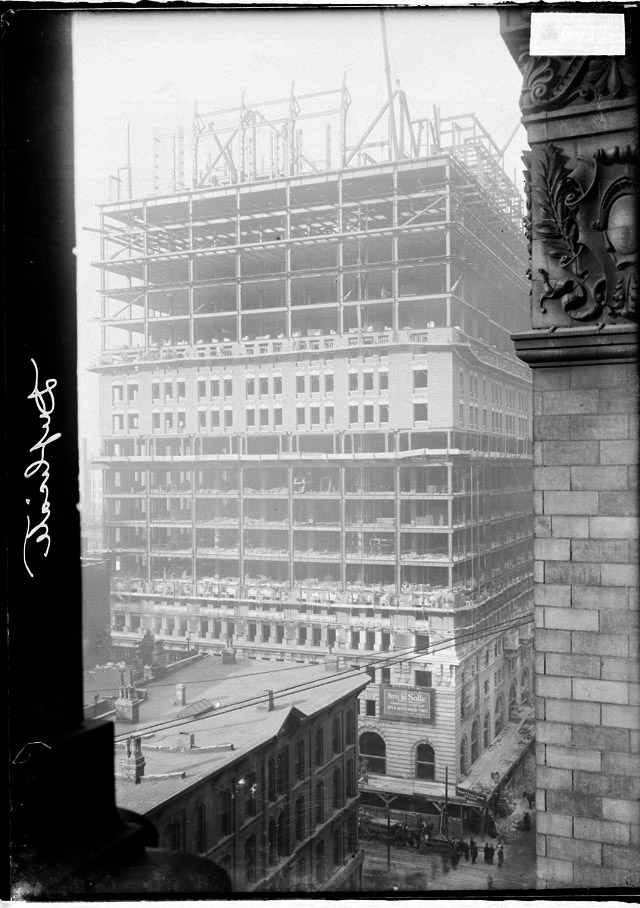
The hotel under construction in 1909

The 23-story, 1,000-room La Salle Hotel was constructed from 1908-1909. The site was on the northwest corner of North LaSalle and West Madison Streets, to the southwest of Chicago City Hall and close to St. Peter's Church. The site had previously been occupied by the five-story La Salle Building from 1872 to 1908 and the adjacent Oriental Hall, a Masonic temple, from 1873. Known as the “Empire Block,” it housed the Metropolitan National Bank.

The hotel was named in honor of Robert Cavelier de LaSalle. Built at a cost of approximately $3,500,000, or 44 cents per cubic foot, the architects were Holabird & Roche while the engineers were the firm of Purdy & Henderson. At one time Chicago's largest hotel, the LaSalle was opened in 1909 by the family of John Paul Stevens. It was run by Ernest J. Stevens, father of the Supreme Court Justice.

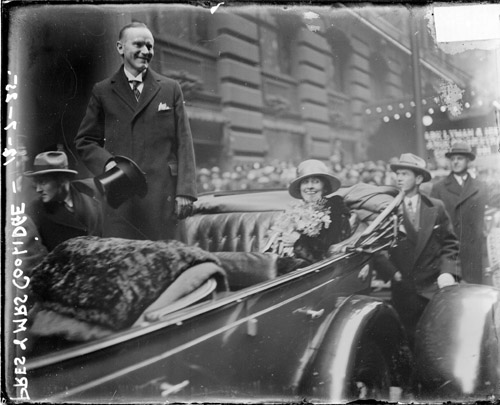
President Calvin Coolidge at the hotel in 1925

The hotel was planned, designed and built in the commercial district of Chicago as an upscale hotel for an elite and influential clientele, with luxurious and stately walnut-paneled rooms and lobbies. An elegant roof top garden was planned as a major attraction. When it was opened in 1909, it was hailed as the "largest, safest, and most modern hotel west of New York." The Republican Party of Illinois had their offices located in the luxurious Blue Fountain Room of the hotel. During one of his long visits to Chicago, President William Howard Taft stayed in the presidential suite on the third floor of this hotel, converting it into de facto White House. A formal visit was also paid to the hotel by President Calvin Coolidge and his wife in 1925. Other visitors came as convention guests. The Prohibition Party's National Convention was held at the hotel from July 10–12, 1928, during which William F. Varney was made the party's presidential nominee. The party again held its convention at the hotel in 1940.

Hollywood actor and dancer, Gene Kelly, told Johnny Carson in a 1975 interview that the only time he fell during an actual performance was on the dance floor at the La Salle Hotel in 1933. He slipped on a grease spot on the dance floor and broke his arm. He got up, took a bow and walked off the floor.

=== Fire ===
On June 5, 1946, a disastrous fire broke out in the hotel, killing 61 people, many of them children. The hotel did not live up to its professed "safest hotel" claim, as there was lack of basic fire prevention, warning and firefighting facilities. At the time of the fire, guests occupied 886 rooms of the hotel, with 103 employees at work. The dead included a battalion chief of the Chicago Fire Department. The fire began in the Silver Grill Cocktail Lounge on the lower floor on the La Salle Street side adjacent to the lobby before ascending stairwells and shafts. The fire started either in the walls or in the ceiling around 12:15 a.m. according to the Chicago Fire Department, but they did not receive their first notification of the fire until 12:35 a.m.

The fire quickly spread through the highly-varnished wood paneling in the lounge and the mezzanine balcony overlooking the lobby. While a significant number died from flames, a greater number of deaths were caused by suffocation from the thick, black smoke. Around 900 guests were able to leave the building but some 150 had to be rescued by the fire services and by heroic members of the public, including two sailors who were reported to have rescued 27 people between them. Blind future Texas House of Representatives member Anita Lee Blair was led to safety by her service dog Fawn. Two-thirds of hotel fire deaths in 1946 occurred in the La Salle and Winecoff (Atlanta) fires. The hotel fire was so devastating, it resulted in the Chicago city council enacting new hotel building codes and fire-fighting procedures, including the installation of automatic alarm systems and instructions of fire safety inside the hotel rooms.

=== Later years ===
After the fire, the hotel was rebuilt at a cost of US $2 million, reopening in July 1947. The Silver Grill Cocktail Lounge, where the fire started, was renamed "The Hour Glass" after renovation.

The hotel closed on June 29, 1976. It was demolished and the 2 North LaSalle skyscraper was completed on the site in 1979.

== Architecture ==
The architects of this skyscraper building developed their own innovative architectural style within the "Chicago School". A special feature of this style is the "Chicago window" with a large pane of plate glass for each window flanked by constricted windows which could be opened. This created an illusion that the entire building was made up of glass.

La Salle billed itself as "Chicago's Finest Hotel" and was a symbol of upper class extravagance in Chicago in the early twentieth century, with its grand ballrooms and luxury restaurants exuding a grandeur of the fine palace hotels of Europe. The hotel was 22 stories high and claimed 1000 rooms. It was one of Chicago's leading hotels until North Michigan Avenue became host to the Drake Hotel (1918–20) and the Allerton Hotel (1923–4). Resembling hotels of New York City, it had a particular similarity to the 1904 Hotel Astor.

=== Exterior ===
The 80.47 m (264.0 ft) above ground level, 22 story building was built on rock caissons and had two basements. The hotel frontage on La Salle Street was 178 ft (54 m) while the Madison Street frontage was 161 ft (49 m). Its architectural style was also defined as "beaux-arts."

=== Interior ===
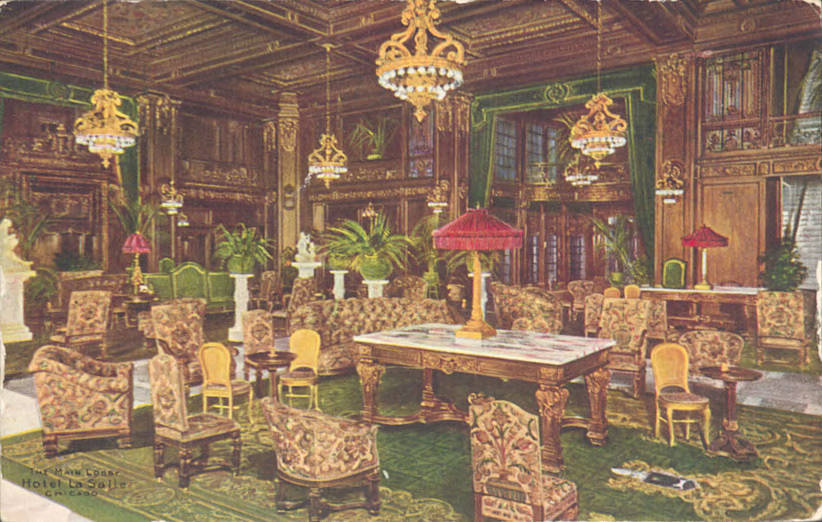
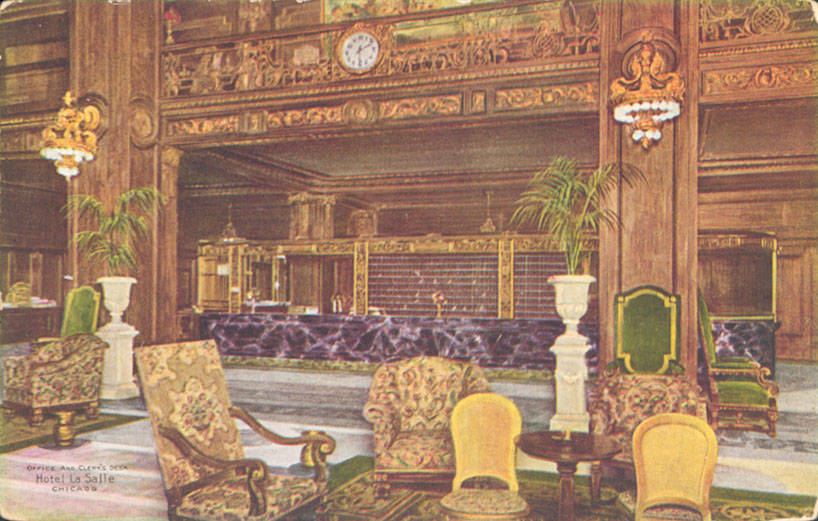
Lobby

The hotel's Main Lobby was dramatic and opulent with green and gold decorations, carrying the theme through its carpets and drapes. It was furbished with marble throughout: floors, statues and a desk. Accents included brass fixtures and spittoons. There were over-sized, upholstered chairs, as well as shorter ones for women and children.

Another fountain, this one glowing and blue, was located in the aptly named Blue Fountain Room. Proposed as a more intimate place to relax, the room was fitted with a marble statuette of Venus de' Medici and a lower, vaulted ceiling. The woodwork was silver maple. Its unique light fixtures were red globes.

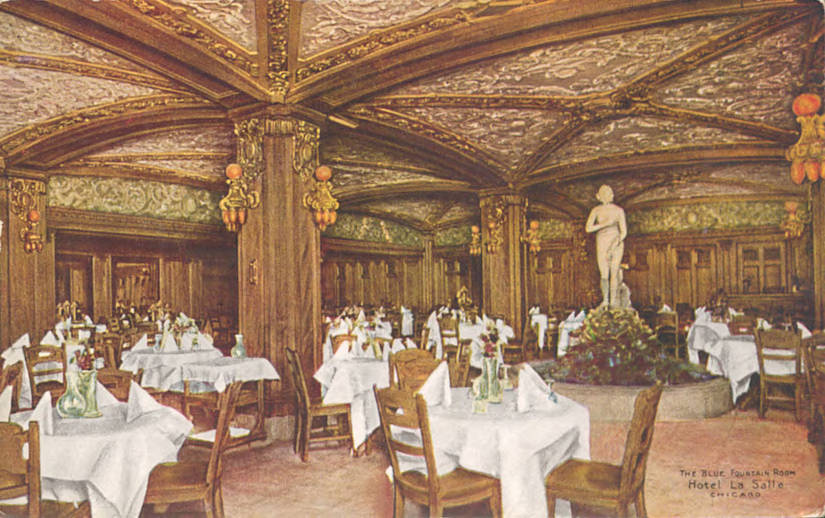
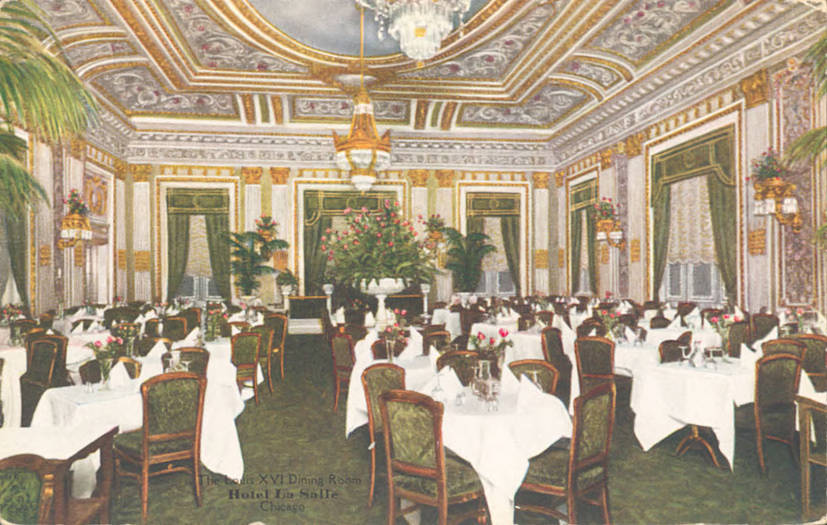
Left: The Blue Fountain Room. Right: Louis XVI Dining Room.

Two large chandeliers hung from the gilded and vaulted ceiling of the green and gold themed Louis XVI Dining Room. Brass sconces were built in between the windows. A gilded and vaulted ceiling, and a repeating green and gold theme drew on the style of the Main Lobby.

Another eating area was the German Room (renamed the Dutch Room during WWI). It was noted for its enormous red brick supports which supported the heavy-beamed and paneled ceilings. The room was furnished with wooden and leather chairs and had blue tiled walls and terra cotta tiled floors. It was here that electric grilling started in Chicago.

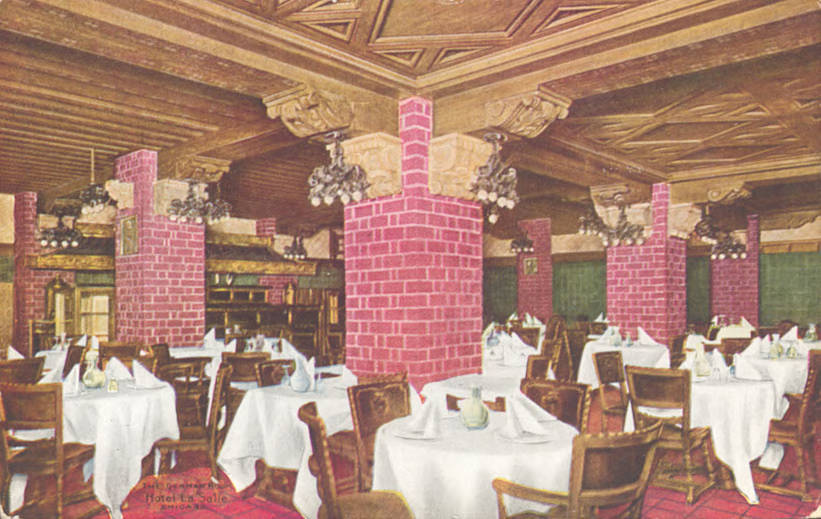
German Room

Considered by some to be Chicago's most beautiful hotel dining room, the Palm Room featured an Italian fountain after a model by Donatello as its centerpiece. It was built of cream-colored stone, Rookwood tile, and gray terra cotta, while featuring high-beamed ceilings.

The ambiguously named Buffet was actually the hotel's bar. It was decorated in the style of a medieval castle with heavy beams, paneled ceilings, and wooden booths. There were murals, lead glass windows, and metal chandeliers.

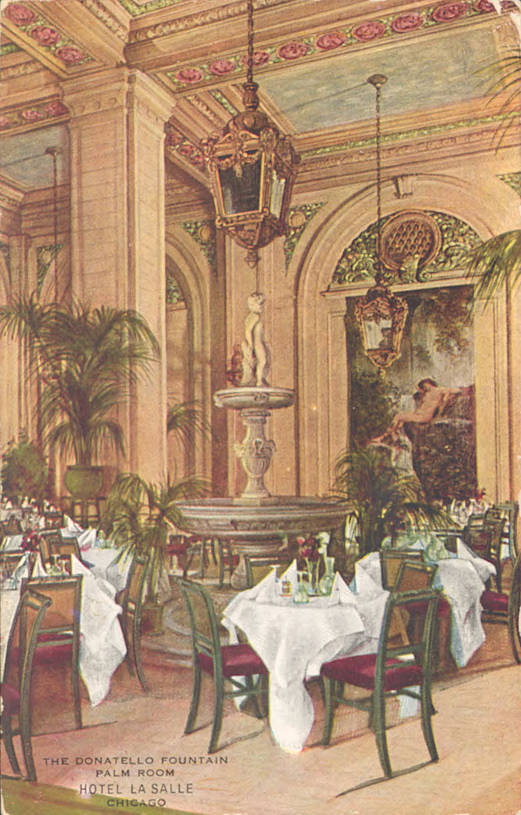
The Palm Room and the Donatello Fountain

The ballroom was designed with arched windows and vaulted ceilings. These were painted trims of blue, gold and green. The curtains and chairs were accented with red velvet. Large chandeliers provided light.

Accessed from a double-loaded corridor, Floors 2 through 18 were sleeping rooms, arranged in a square doughnut formation. A central light well was built into the hotel, extending from the lobby to the top of the building. The guest rooms were designed as suites of paired rooms, each with its own bathroom.

Large enough to accommodate a grand piano, the Presidential Suite featured a white marble fireplace.
