= 1928 Prohibition National Convention =

American political convention

- 1928 presidential election

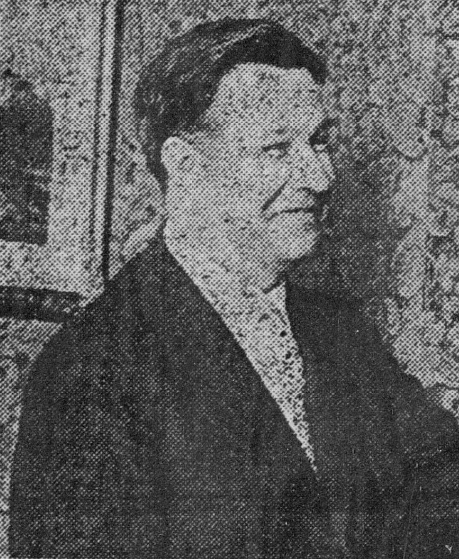
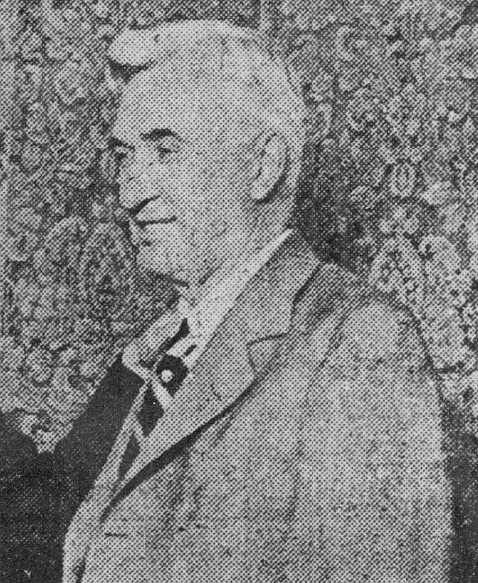
- Nominees (Varney & Edgerton)

Convention
- Dates: July 10–12, 1928
- City: Chicago, Illinois
- Venue: La Salle Hotel

Candidates
- Presidential nominee: William F. Varney of New York
- Vice-presidential nominee: James A. Edgerton of Virginia

Voting
- Total delegates: 1,537 (allocated)

The 1928 Prohibition National Convention was held at the La Salle Hotel in Chicago, Illinois, on July 10–12, 1928. The convention nominated William F. Varney for president and James A. Edgerton for vice president.

== Background ==
The party had seen a sizable decline in support after the 1920 elections. Despite this, Dr. D. Leigh Colvin and other Prohibitionists were considering again nominating a national ticket, finding the planks regarding prohibition in the platforms of the Republican and Democratic conventions to be unsatisfactory.

== Logistics ==
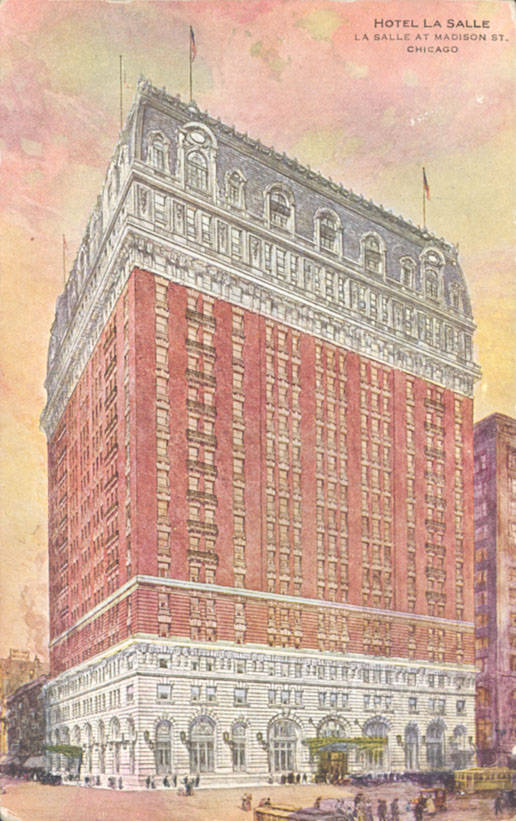
Postcard of the La Salle Hotel, venue of the convention

The convention, the party's fifteenth national convention, convened at the La Salle Hotel in Chicago on July 10, 1928. It adjourned on July 12.

When it was scheduled, the convention was allocated to have 1,537 delegates. 1,000 were to be chosen from the general membership of the national party. 537 state delegates (with states being allocated delegate representations in proportion to their electoral votes).

A merging of forces between the party and the Farmer-Labor Party (which also convened its convention in Chicago on July 10) was explored for some time, and a committee was even appointed which identified a potential fusion ticket ticket of Gifford Pinchot for president and former Governor William Ellery Sweet of Colorado for Vice President. However, neither possible nominee responded to inquiries whether they would accept the nomination, and both the Farmer-Labor and Prohibition Parties ultimately tabled motions calling for presidential electoral fusion between their parties.

James A. Edgerton, president of the Jefferson-Lincoln League, had organized for his organization to also hold a national convention in Chicago on July 9, with intent of nominating its own presidential ticket and form plans to form plans for joining with other "Forces of Reform" convening in Chicago the following day (the Prohibition Party and Farmer–Labor).

== Nominations ==
The name of former Governor Gifford Pinchot of Pennsylvania was floated as a potential contender for the presidential nomination though there were those like Colvin who wanted to take advantage of the Democrat's nomination of a Al Smith (a "wet" (Note: "wet" was a label which referred to opposition to alcohol prohibition, while "dry" referred to support for alcohol prohibition) Catholic by nominating a "dry" Southern Democrat to the head of the ticket. It was hope that this might allow the part to carry a Southern state. William Gibbs McAdoo, Senator Robert Owen of Oklahoma, and former IRS Commissioner Daniel Roper were names considered for a draft. A merger with the Farmer-Labor Party was contemplated for a time, and a committee was appointed which named a potential ticket of Gifford Pinchot for President and former Governor William Ellery Sweet of Colorado for Vice President; however neither man responded to inquiries whether they would accept the nomination, and eventually both the Prohibition and Farmer-Labor Parties tabled motions calling for fusion.

There remained immense pressure within the party to name Republican nominee Herbert Hoover as their choice for president (in an act of electoral fusion), despite his dithering on the issue of prohibition enforcement in the eyes of the stricter Drys, and indeed when the balloting for the presidential nomination commenced Hoover was found to be the second-most-popular choice of the delegates. Those opposed to Hoover rallied on the second ballot however behind frontrunner William F. Varney, an insurance salesman and party regular from New York. This allowed Varney to secure the presidential nomination. James Edgerton, a Virginian native who had headed the Jefferson-Lincoln League in the failed effort to fuse the Prohibition and Farmer-Labor Parties, was nominated for the vice presidency.

For president, Varney only narrowly defeated Hoover, who was nominated by members who did not want their nominee to be a spoiler candidate. Varney received 66 delegates on the second ballot against Hoover's 45 delegates.

== Aftermath ==
After the convention, an olive branch was still offered to Hoover, with the Prohibition Party promising to withdraw their ticket and endorse his candidacy if he made a public declaration for Prohibition, and that he would uphold the Volstead Act, and present legislation to better enforce both during his term as president. Indeed, there remained a concerted effort to withdraw the ticket from the race, resulting in a meeting by the Party National Executive Committee on whether Varney should drop out. Varney himself was opposed to this plan, and in a narrow vote, four to three, the effort to effectively endorse Hoover for the presidency failed. Still, there remained a concern that the ticket might potentially spoil the race and accidentally result in Smith's election to the presidency, and so care was taken to avoid any repeat of 1884; Prohibition Party electors were not filed in New York, and Varney and Edgerton were to confine their campaigning to the Solid South and the Border States, reasoning that many Dry Democrats there might still vote for Smith unless they were given a third option.
