= John W. Aiken =

American politician (1896–1968)

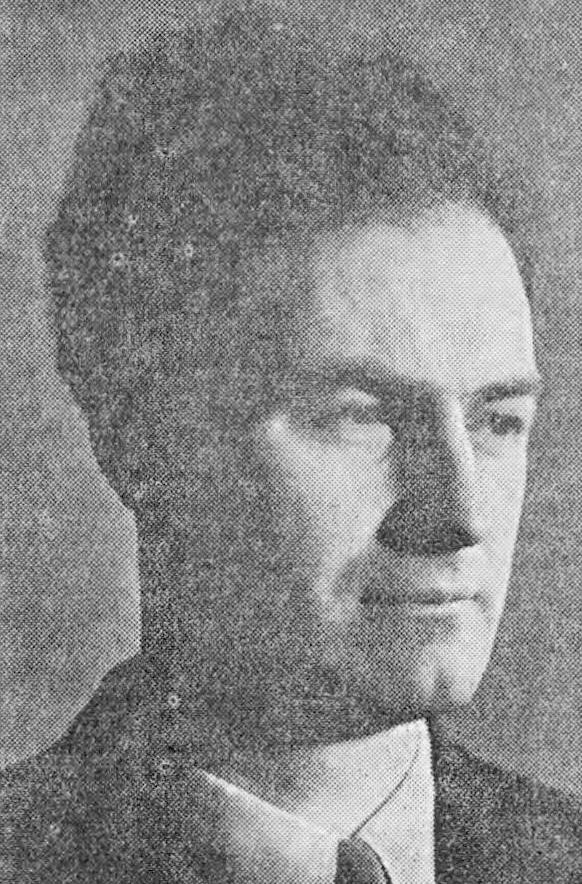
Aiken in 1936

John William Aiken (August 13, 1896 – December 14, 1968) was an American furniture finisher and socialist activist. Aiken was the vice-presidential and presidential nominee of the Socialist Labor Party of America.

Aiken was born in Saugus, Massachusetts, in 1896, to John T. Aiken, a shoemaker, and Alice L. Smith.

In 1932, Aiken was the vice-presidential nominee of the SLP alongside Verne L. Reynolds. In 1936, Aiken, now a Chelsea, Massachusetts resident, was named to the top of the ticket with Emil F. Teichert as the party's nominee for vice president. The Aiken/Teichert campaign received 12,799 votes.

In 1940, Aiken was again named SLP presidential nominee. Aaron M. Orange of New York was the SLP choice for vice president. The Aiken/Orange ticket received 14,883 votes.

Aiken was a resident of a mobile home park in East Hartford, Connecticut, and died in Bridgeport. His neighbors were unaware that Aiken had ever been involved in politics. He had six children and served in the United States Army's Motor Transport Corps during World War I. He was also active in the International Union of Painters and Allied Trades. He requested no obituaries after his death.

Preceded by Verne L. Reynolds	Socialist Labor Party Presidential candidate 1932, 1936, 1940	Succeeded by Edward A. Teichert
