= 1928 Farmer–Labor National Convention =

1928 Farmer-Labor National Convention
- 1928 presidential election

Convention
- Date(s): July 10–11, 1928
- City: Chicago, Illinois

Candidates
- Presidential nominee: George W. Norris of Nebraska (declined)
- Vice-presidential nominee: William J. Vereen (declined)

The 1928 Farmer–Labor National Convention was held July 10–11, 1928 in Chicago, Illinois. It nominated George W. Norris for president and William J. Vereen for vice president. Both declined the party's nomination, and the party instead ultimately nominated Frank Elbridge Webb for president and LeRoy R. Tillman for vice president.

== Logistics ==
The convention was the third presidential nominating convention in the history of the national Farmer-Labor Party, and met on July 10–11, 1928 in Chicago, Illinois.

A merging of forces between the party and the Prohibition Party (which also convened its convention in Chicago on July 10) was explored for some time, and a committee was even appointed which identified a potential fusion ticket ticket of Gifford Pinchot for president and former Governor William Ellery Sweet of Colorado for Vice President. However, neither possible nominee responded to inquiries whether they would accept the nomination, and both the Farmer-Labor and Prohibition Parties ultimately tabled motions calling for presidential electoral fusion between their parties.

== Nomination ==
=== Convention result ===
At the convention, the party nominated Senator George W. Norris of Nebraska for president. Norris, however, stuck by an earlier declaration that he had made in which he stated he would not run as the party's nominee because he felt that the political machinery necessary to wage a successful campaign for the presidency was not possible for him to establish so late into the campaigning season.

For vice president, the convention nominated William J. Vereen of Georgia, a cotton textile manufacturer. However, Vereen only found out he had been nominated after being contacted by news reporters, and refused to entertain accepting the nomination.

=== Subsequent replacement nominees ===
Some months after the convention, the party's presidential nomination was tendered to Colonel Frank Elbridge Webb of California, with the vice presidential nomination being offered to Senator James Reed of Missouri after Webb rejected the idea of potentially running with Senator James Thomas Heflin of Alabama; as with Vereen, Reed had no prior knowledge of his impending nomination and wholly rejected it, purportedly saying "Who in hell is Webb?". A third man, Dr. Henry Quincy Alexander of North Carolina was then nominated in Reed's stead. However, on September 18, Alexander requested that his name be withdrawn from the ticket. Alexander later endorsed Democratic nominee Al Smith for the presidency. At some point after this, LeRoy R. Tillman (a nephew of the late Senator Benjamin Tillman of South Carolina) was nominated in Alexander's stead.
