= Frank T. Johns =

American politician

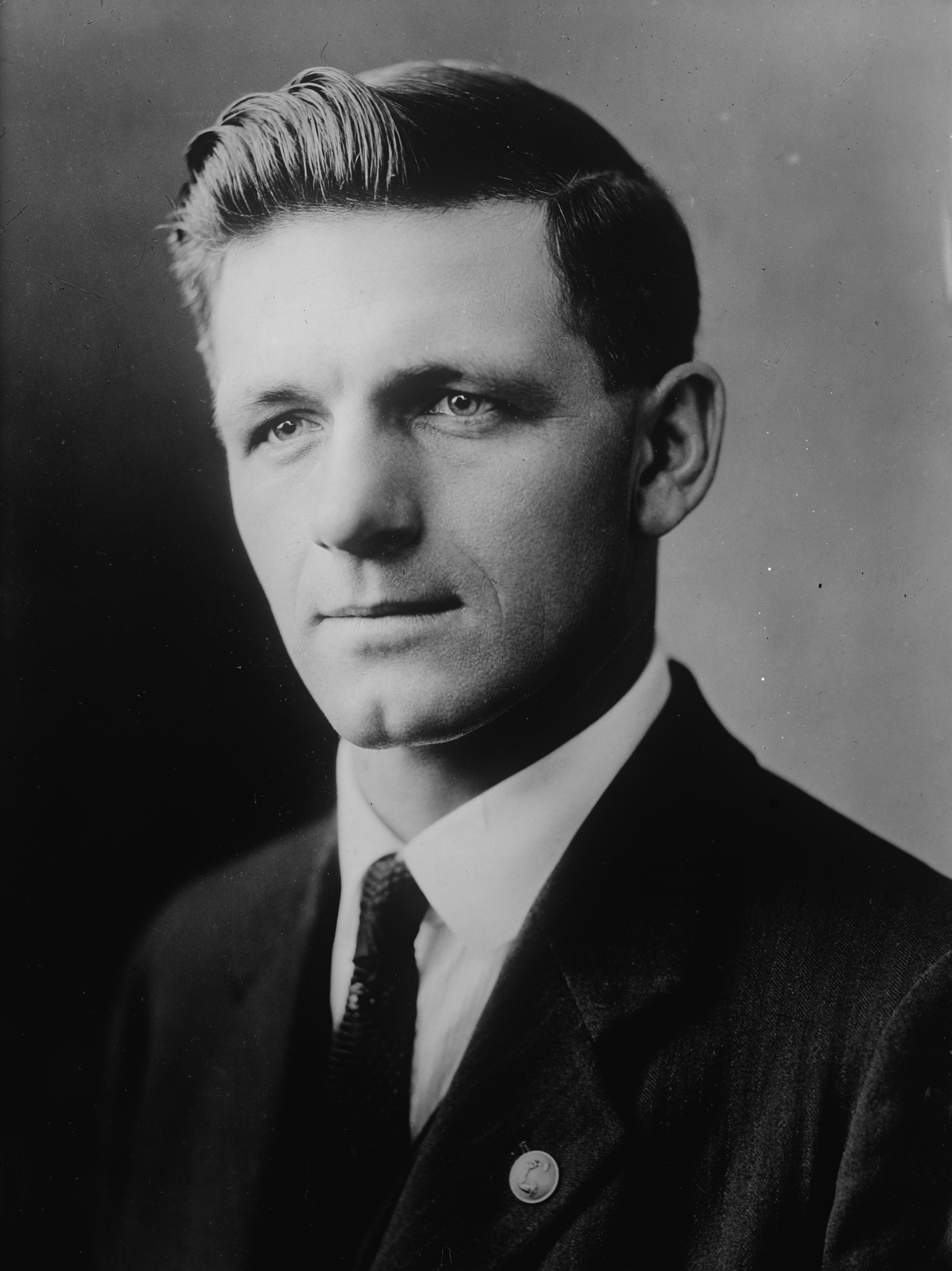
- Frank T. Johns, mid 1920s
- Born: February 23, 1889
- Died: May 2, 1928 (aged 39); Deschutes River, Bend, Oregon, U.S.
- Occupations: Politician; political activist; carpenter
- Political party: Socialist Labor Party
- Children: 2

Frank Tetes Johns (February 23, 1889 – May 20, 1928) was an American socialist activist and politician. A carpenter by trade, he is best remembered for having been twice nominated for President of the United States by the Socialist Labor Party of America.

== Biography ==
=== Early life ===
Frank T. Johns was born February 23, 1889. He was a carpenter by trade and made his home in Portland, Oregon.

=== Political career ===
Johns ran twice for U.S. Congress in the Oregon 3rd District, where he was the 1920 and 1922 nominee of the "Industrial Labor Party." This organization was the name by which the Socialist Labor Party of America (SLP) was forced to appear on the Oregon ballot in those years due to state electoral laws.

Johns was nominated for President of the United States by the Socialist Labor Party of America (SLP) in 1924. At the time of his selection, Johns was the youngest person ever to be nominated by a political party to run for president, just 255 days over the constitutional requirement of 35 years. Johns and running mate Verne L. Reynolds received 33,904 votes from 20 states in which they appeared on the ballot.

The official report by the SLP's governing National Executive Committee to the organization's 1928 convention cast the 1924 campaign of Johns and Reynolds in a favorable light:

"An intense campaign was carried on in 1924 with the two candidates heading the force of agitators in the campaign. Both Comrades Johns and Reynolds performed splendid work for the Party, both of them exerting themselves almost to the point of exhaustion. Both candidates toured from east to west and addressed a great number of outdoor meetings with the number of attentive listeners running into the thousands. We succeeded in getting on the ballot in twenty states and although the vote that was cast might not seem proportionate to the effort expended, still we have cause to be satisfied with the result, for the SLP understands that it is not primarily a question of the number of votes cast, but the amount of agitation done and the number of workers reached, that counts."

Satisfied with their previous performance, the May National Convention of the Socialist Labor Party in New York City renominated their 1924 ticket of Frank T. Johns for President and Verne L. Reynolds for Vice President for the 1928 campaign.

=== Death and legacy ===
The 1928 convention of the SLP adjourned on May 14 and the party's candidates immediately began to prepare to start their tours of America to speak on behalf of their candidacies and the socialist cause. Frank Johns headed home for Oregon, making his first appearance of the campaign in the Central Oregon town of Bend on Sunday afternoon, May 20. At the end of his speech, delivered at a park on the banks of the Deschutes River, Johns was answering the questions of some of those who had attended his speech. Suddenly, cries rang out from a young boy who had fallen from a footbridge into the river and was being swept away by the current. Johns instantly threw off his coat and dove into the frigid river in an attempt to retrieve the boy. He swam about 75 yards to reach the youngster and began to swim with him, pulling the boy to shore. A short distance from safety Johns' strength gave out and the pair were swept away to their deaths.

Frank Johns was 39 years old at the time of his death, and the boy he unsuccessfully tried to rescue, John C. "Jack" Rhodes Jr. of Bend, was 10.

Distressed by the loss but choosing to move onward, on May 22, 1928, the NEC of the Socialist Labor Party made Verne Reynolds its new nominee for president. The party then added Jeremiah D. Crowley of Syracuse, New York to the ticket as its new choice for vice president on June 7.

Johns was posthumously awarded a Carnegie Medal for Heroism, which paid his widowed wife (who died in 1933) and the couple's two daughters a stipend of $1,000 per year.

== Works ==
- "Reform Straws Show How the Revolutionary Wind Blows," Weekly People, vol. 34, no. 5 (April 26, 1924), pg. 5.
- "Letter of Acceptance of Frank T. Johns, Socialist Labor Party Candidate for President of the US," May 15, 1924. Appendix to 16th National Convention, Socialist Labor Party, May 10-13, 1924: Minutes, Reports, Resolutions, Platform, Etc. New York: National Executive Committee, Socialist Labor Party, 1924; pp. 149–153.
