= James A. Edgerton =

American poet, philosopher and activist

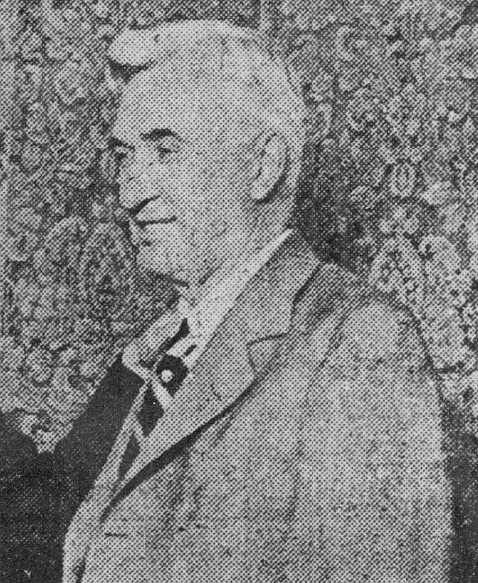
James A. Edgerton

James Arthur Edgerton (1869 – December 3, 1938) was an American poet, philosopher and political activist from Alexandria, Virginia, United States. Edgerton was the vice-presidential nominee of the Prohibition Party in the 1928 presidential election. He was on the ticket alongside presidential nominee William F. Varney. Edgerton defeated former Prohibition Party State Representative from Illinois Frank S. Regan by a 68–29 margin. Edgerton urged that his ticket be withdrawn in states where it could have hurt the chances of Herbert Hoover's election to the presidency. Hoover favored prohibition, whereas his Democratic opponent, Al Smith, was well known for his anti-prohibition views. Varney and Edgerton were only on the ballot in seven states. The Prohibition Party in California refused to support their party's nominee and nominated the Republican ticket on the Prohibition ballot line instead.

Edgerton was a veteran alternative party activist by the time of his vice-presidential nomination; in 1897, he was the Populist Party's nominee for clerk of the United States House of Representatives, as well as having served on the national executive committee of that party.
