= William F. Varney =

American politician

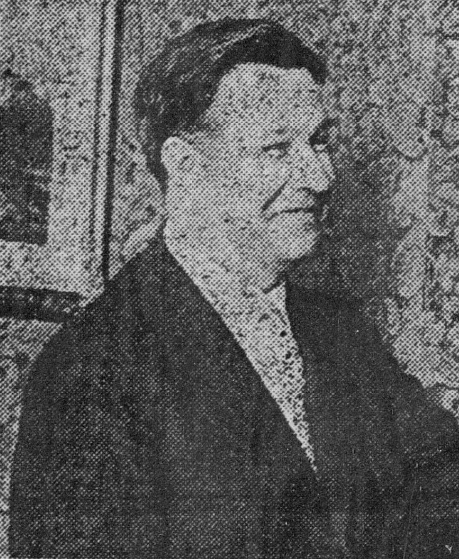

Personal details
- Born: October 1, 1884 Paterson, New Jersey, U.S.
- Died: December 13, 1960 (aged 76) East Rockaway, New York, U.S.
- Party: Prohibition
- Spouse: Leonia Abrams
- Children: 3
- Parent: William Frederick Varney (father)

William Frederick Varney (October 1, 1884 – December 13, 1960) was an American politician who served as the Prohibition Party's presidential candidate in 1928 and in other New York campaigns.

== Life ==
On October 1, 1884, William Frederick Varney was born to Frederick William Varney, who served as president of the Eastern conference of the Methodist Protestant church, in Paterson, New Jersey.

He became a prohibitionist in 1906 after meeting a patient who swore to never drink alcohol again if he recovered his health. From 1912 to 1918 he served as field secretary of the New Jersey Prohibition Party and was elected to the national committee in 1924. He ran for the Prohibition Party's presidential nomination in 1928 (at the 1928 Prohibition National Convention) and narrowly defeated Herbert Hoover, who was nominated by members who did not want their nominee to be a spoiler candidate, with 66 delegates on the second ballot against Hoover's 45 delegates. In the general election he conducted a front porch campaign and only received 20,101 votes (0.09 percent), slightly more than the 14,394 votes Hoover received from the Prohibition ballot line in California, which was the worst performance for a Prohibition presidential nominee since Neal Dow's 10,364 votes in 1880. In 1929 he was elected as president of the Prohibition Party to replace D. Leigh Colvin following his forced resignation. He later ran for mayor of Rockville Centre, during which he was accused of being a member of the Ku Klux Klan but he rejected the accusation as false, and in 1934 he ran with the Law Preservation nomination for governor of New York, but only received 20,449 votes causing the party to lose its automatic ballot access.

In 1919, he created an insurance agency and operated it until his retirement in 1957. On December 13, 1960, Varney died from cerebral thrombosis in a nursing home in East Rockaway.
