= Jeremiah D. Crowley =

American socialist activist

Jeremiah D. Crowley was an American socialist activist from New York. In May 1928, Crowley was nominated for Vice-President on the Socialist Labor Party of America ticket alongside Verne L. Reynolds.

At the May 1928 convention, the SLP nominated Frank T. Johns for President and Verne L. Reynolds as his running mate in the 1928 presidential election. However, Johns died while attempting to save a drowning boy at a campaign event in Oregon two weeks later. As a result, the SLP's National Executive Committee named Reynolds as the party's nominee for President and Crowley as his running-mate. The pair were on the ballot in 19 states and received 21,590 votes. The ticket finished in 5th place nationally, just ahead of the Prohibition Party.
