= Verne L. Reynolds =

American politician (1884–1959)

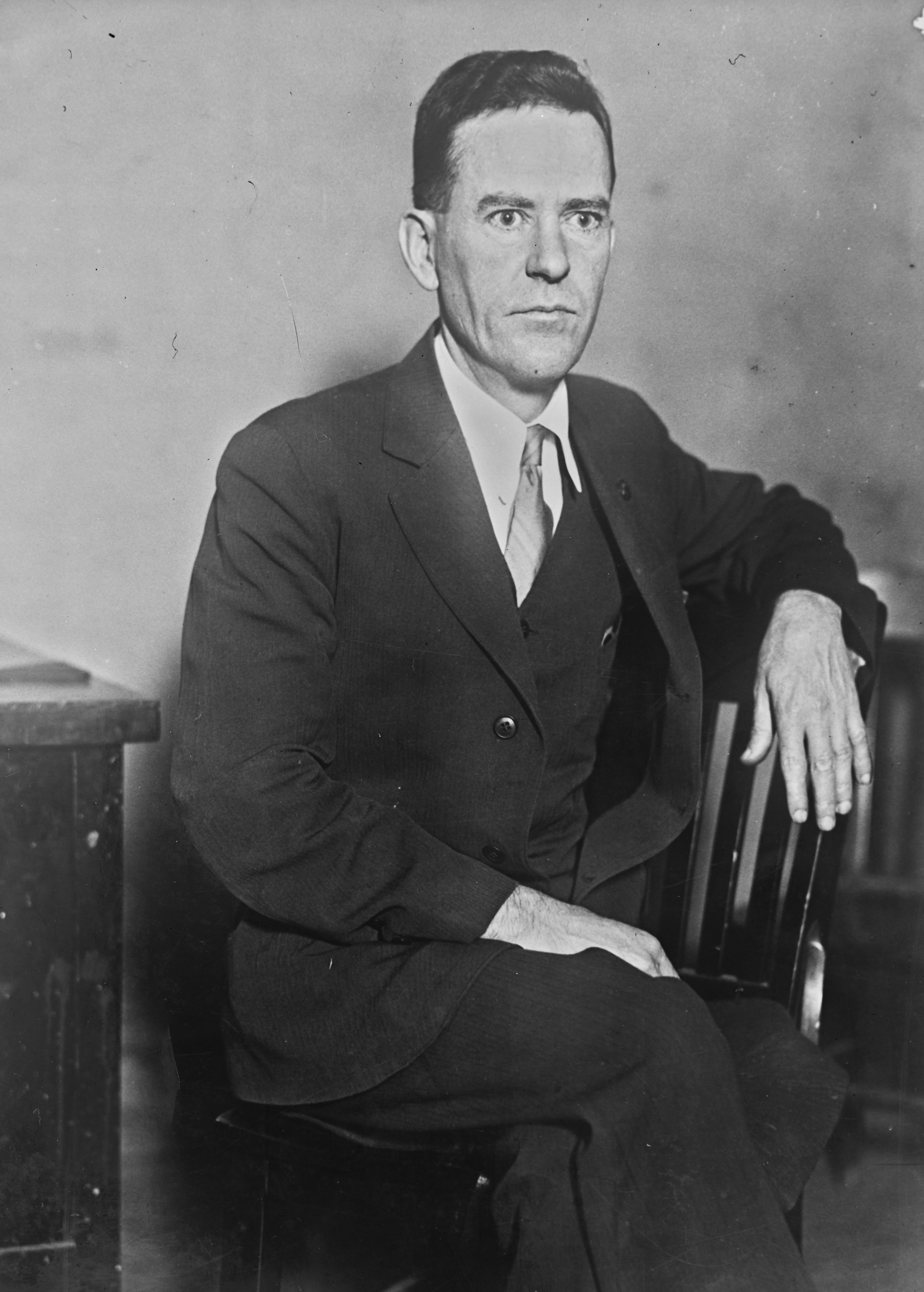
- Reynolds in 1928
- Born: Verne LaRue Reynolds; March 7, 1884
- Died: September 16, 1959 (aged 75); Phoenix, Arizona, U.S.
- Occupation: Socialist activist
- Children: Mack Reynolds

Verne LaRue Reynolds (March 7, 1884 – September 16, 1959) was an American socialist activist. Reynolds was a multi-time candidate for national office with the Socialist Labor Party of America (SLP).

In 1924, Reynold was the SLP's vice-presidential nominee. He was on the ticket with Frank T. Johns of Oregon. The SLP ticket earned 28,633 votes and was on the ballot in 19 states.

In May 1928, Reynolds was nominated again to run for vice president alongside Johns. However, Johns died later that month trying to rescue a young boy who had fallen in a river at a campaign event in Bend, Oregon. Two days after his death, Reynolds was nominated as the SLP's nominee for president alongside Jeremiah D. Crowley. The Reynolds/Crowley campaign received 21,590 votes in 19 states.

Reynolds was again the SLP's presidential nominee in 1932. Alongside vice-presidential nominee John W. Aiken, the campaign increased the number of votes received to 34,038, which was the most for an SLP presidential ticket since the 1900 election.

Reynolds died on September 16, 1959, in Phoenix, Arizona. Reynold was responsible for inspiring Eric Hass to join the SLP.

== Mack Reynolds ==
In 1917, Verne Reynolds's wife, Pauline McCord had a son named Mack Reynolds. He would go on to write one of the first Star Trek novels. Mack was an active member of the SLP; his fiction often dealt with socialist reform and revolution as well as socialist utopian thought, and his characters often used DeLeonite terminology, such as "industrial feudalism".
