= 1924 Prohibition National Convention =

- 1924 presidential election

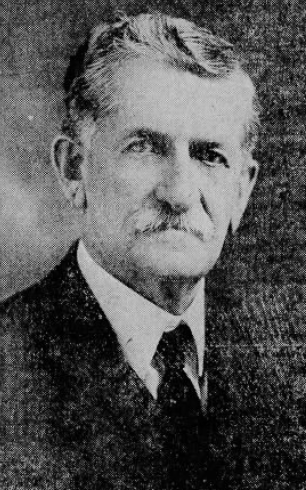
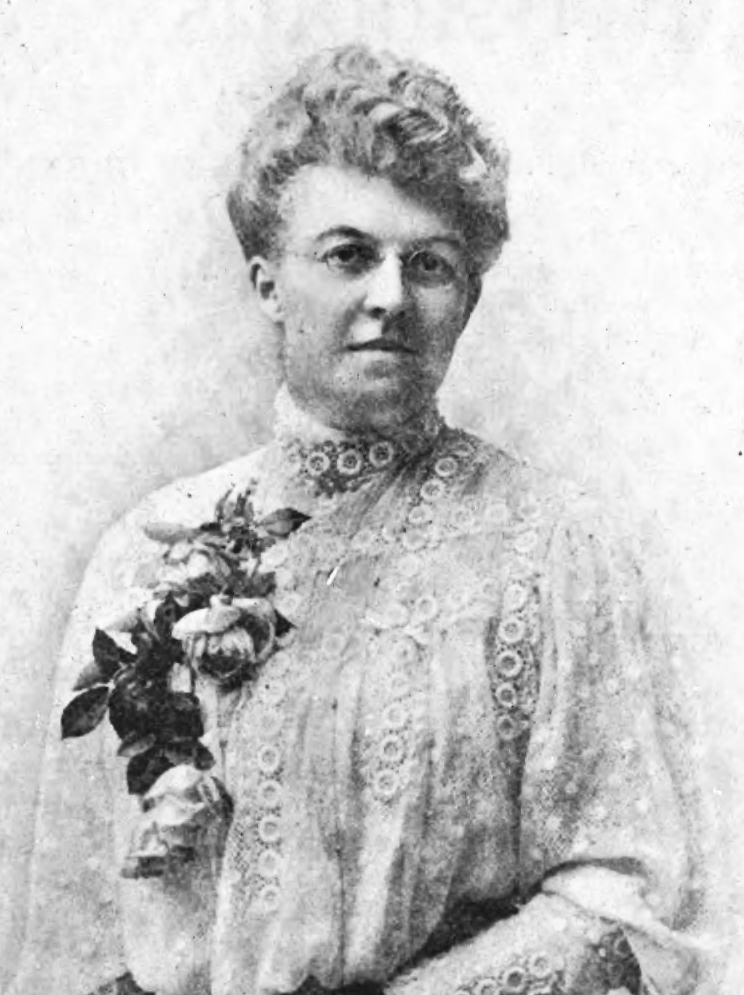
- Nominees (Watkins & Brehm)

Convention
- Date(s): June 4–6, 1924
- City: Columbus, Ohio
- Venue: Franklin County Memorial Hall

Candidates
- Presidential nominee: Herman P. Faris of Missouri
- Vice-presidential nominee: Marie C. Brehm of California

The 1924 Prohibition National Convention was held in Columbus, Ohio, June 4–6, 1924. The convention nominated Herman P. Faris for president and Marie C. Brehm for vice president.

== Logistics ==
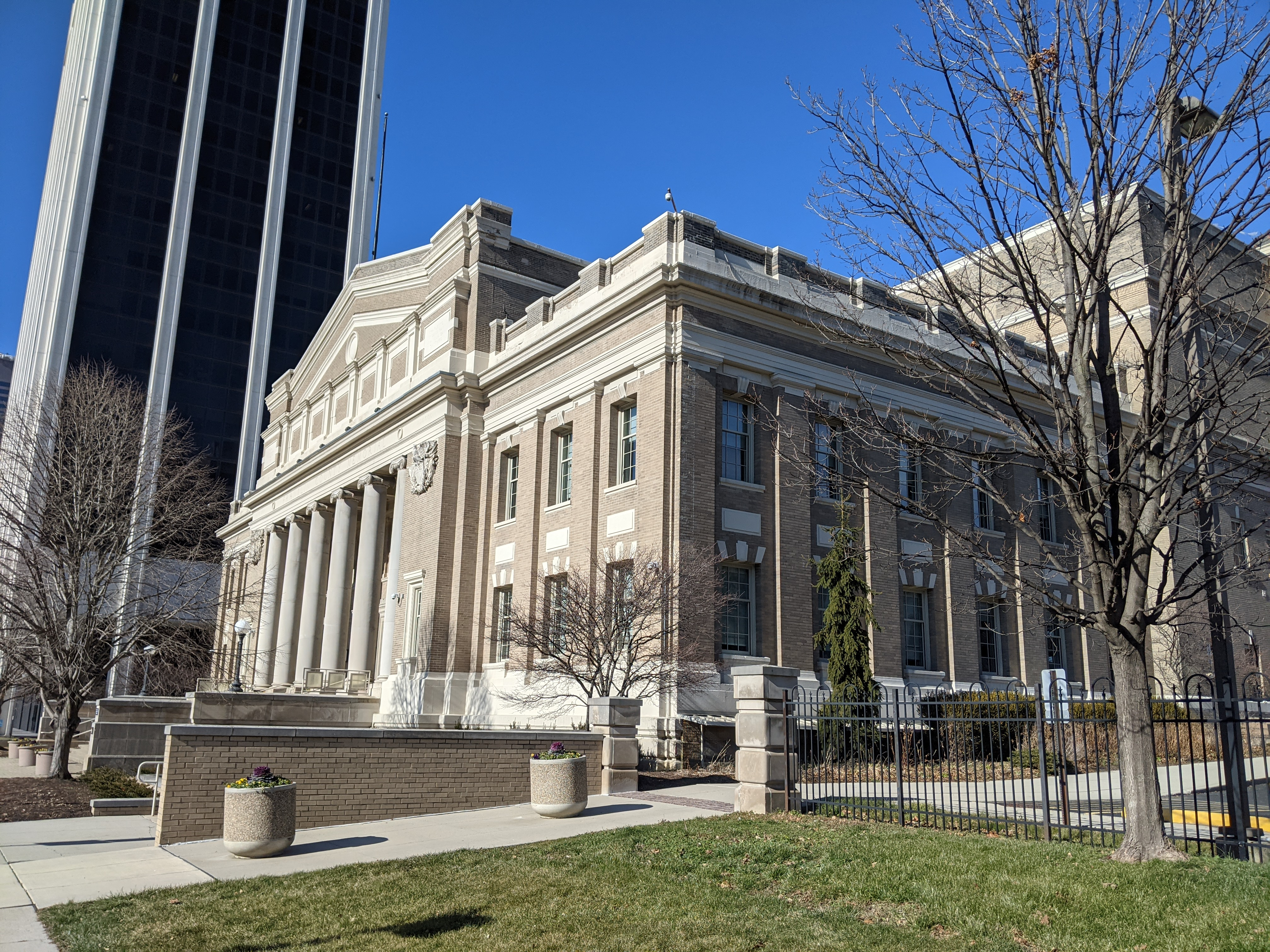
Franklin County Memorial Hall, venue of the convention (photographed in 2021)

The convention was held July 4–6 at Franklin County Memorial Hall in Columbus, Ohio. Organizers made arrangements for between 500 and 1,000 delegates to attend. Days before the convention, the American Party held its convention at the Deshler Hotel in the same city.

== Nominations ==
The convention nominated two longtime Prohibition Party activists and politicians on its presidential ticket: Herman P. Faris for president and Marie C. Brehm for vice president. The vice presidential nomination of Brehm marked the first instance in which a woman was nominated on a presidential ticket after the 19th Amendment to the United States Constitution had granted national women's suffrage.

Presidential vote
	1st ballot
Herman P. Faris	82
A. P. Gouthey	40
William F. Varney	2

== Party platform ==
The party had previously, before the prohibition era, been ideologically progressive. With prohibition now the status quo, and with public sentiment growing in support of a repeal of prohibition, the Prohibition Party shifted from a previously political force to a conservative party that opposed social change. Its 1924 platform included a plank calling for the Bible to have a more prominent position in public schools, and another which declared all that unassimilated immigrants to be a menace to American institutions and demanding that they Americanize. These two planks were in significant contrast to the party's first platform adopted at its 1872 convention, in which it supported the Constitutional guarantees of civil and religious freedom, and called supported immigration into the United States.
