= Marie C. Brehm =

American prohibitionist, suffragist and politician

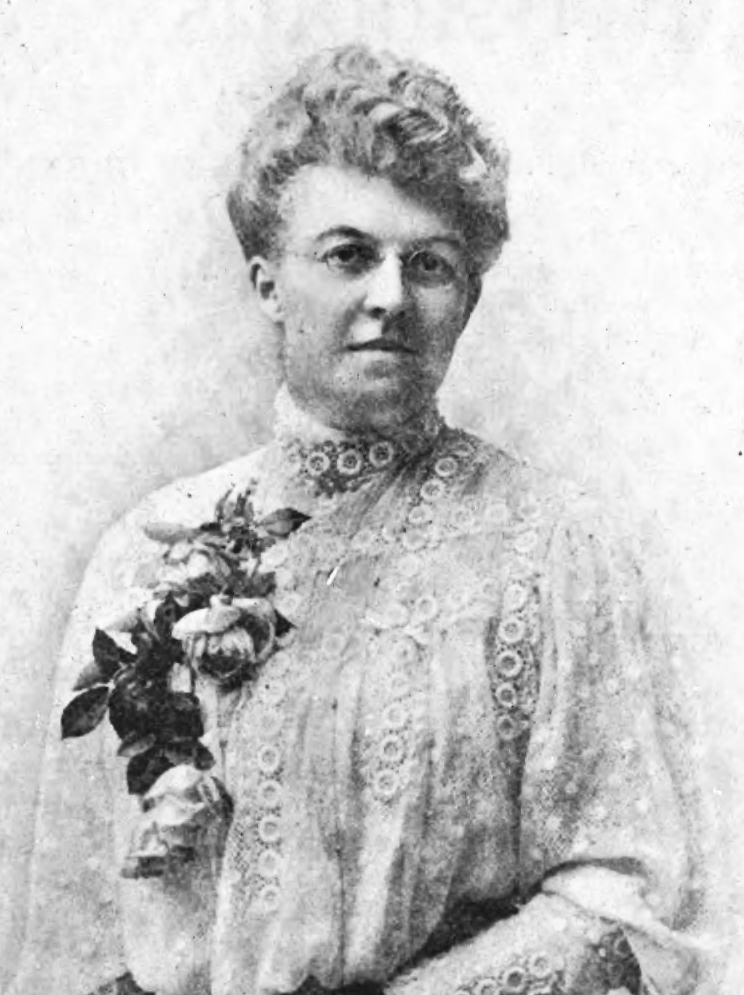
- Marie C. Brehm, from a 1920 publication.
- Born: June 30, 1859; Sandusky, Ohio, U.S.
- Died: January 21, 1926 (aged 66); Pasadena, California, U.S.
- Resting place: Oakland Cemetery, Sandusky, Ohio
- Occupations: Prohibitionist, suffragist, politician

Marie Caroline Brehm (June 30, 1859 – January 21, 1926) was an American prohibitionist, suffragist, and politician. The Head of the suffrage department for the Woman's Christian Temperance Union (WCTU), she was a key figure in the Prohibition Party and Presbyterian Church, active in both local and national politics, and an advocate of reform laws. Twice she was appointed by the President to represent the United States at the World's Anti-Alcoholic Congress in Europe. Additionally, she was the first woman to run for the Vice President of the United States after the 19th amendment granted women the right to vote.

== Early life and family ==
Brehm was born in Sandusky, Ohio, to William Henry and Elizabeth Rode Brehm as the third of eight children. Her father was a dry goods merchant. Her siblings were Minnie Duennisch-Schaber, Theodore Brehm, Elizabeth C. Forth, William H. Brehm, Frederick Conrad Brehm, John Brehm, and Carrie Brehm. She was reported to be a voracious reader, having read about 300 books from the Sunday school library when she was a child. Brehm's mother, a widow, was reported to have committed suicide by throwing herself into the bay in 1896.

Brehm was a lecturer and educator in the public school system of Sandusky, where she also conducted private lessons in languages and civics. In 1883 or 1884, Brehm left her job as a bookkeeper in Sandusky and moved to Olney, Illinois, where she taught art, embroidery, and painting for five years. During this time, she was also a teacher and Superintendent of a Sunday school in the First Presbyterian Church of that city.

While teaching at the Claremont School in Olney during the 1887–88 term, she resided with her uncle, Captain William Rhode and his wife. Rhode was a successful businessman with a thriving hardware store, clothing business, as well as a bustling tavern and resort.

== Temperance and suffrage work ==
Brehm first became involved in the Woman's Christian Temperance Union (WCTU) organization in 1891, during which time she was an organizing member, and made president of the local chapter in April of that year.

In September 1891 she served as secretary of a WCTU district convention in Newton, Illinois, where she was elected District President of a ten-county district and greatly increased WCTU membership and engagement over the next four years. Following her district work, Brehm was appointed State Superintendent of the WCTU Institutes, which grew under her direction into one of the most influential branches of the work, with her methodology replicated across the United States.

In 1895 Frances Willard, National President of the WCTU, recommended Brehm to be National Superintendent of the Franchise Department at the Baltimore National Convention, a position she held for seven years. The WCTU Franchise Department was charged with all suffrage activities, their goal being, "to persuade all the women to want to vote, and to persuade all the men to let them vote." While serving as the National Superintendent, Brehm was involved in a "turf war" between the National American Woman's Suffrage Association (NAWSA) and the WCTU. In May of 1899, the NAWSA requested, via the WCTU Executive Committee, that the WCTU refrain from involving itself in any suffrage-related legislation, campaign, or action and keep WCTU's activities confined to "prohibition and social purity." The letter requesting co-operation was sent by Carrie Chapman Catt, Laura Clay, and Lucy Hobart Day. In addition, Catt appeared at the 26th Convention of the National WCTU (1899) in Seattle, Washington, in order to present NAWSA's position in person. The WCTU rejected these overtures with the explanation, "...while earnestly desiring harmony and unity of action, together with mutual co-operation, we cannot sacrifice judgement nor convictions of duty, and must continue to follow out our own plans and methods..." Further, at a speech given by Brehm titled "Why Woman Wants the Ballot," she stressed the importance of the female vote to achieve prohibition:

"What we need in this country is a snow-storm of pure Christian prohibition ballots, which will make lifeless and powerless the great, organized, legalized rum system, and the women are asking for the ballot that we may help you men to bring about a snow-storm which shall accomplish this purpose."

Brehm succeeded Louise S. Rounds as President of the Illinois WCTU, where she served for five terms, from 1901 to 1906. For six years, Brehm served as Special Lecturer of Scientific Temperance of the Board of Temperance and Moral Welfare of The General Assembly of the Presbyterian Church of the United States. At the National American Convention of 1906 for NAWSA, Brehm represented the WCTU as president of Illinois and presented on "Heroes and Heroines" as part of Carrie Chapman Catt's program "Women in History."

Upon retiring from office in the WCTU, Brehm traveled across the United States as a lecturer for the temperance and welfare department of the Presbyterian Church for 25 years. She lectured on the church's behalf not only in the United States, but also in Canada, Ireland, Scotland, England, the Netherlands, Germany, Italy, and Switzerland. Her travels included representing the Federal Council of Churches at The Hague, Netherlands, in September, 1911, and addressing the World's Sunday School Convention in Zurich, Switzerland, in July 1913. It is reported that she crossed the United States from ocean to ocean twenty-seven times in her career.

Additionally, Brehm was a lecturer on the Chautauqua circuit, holding forth on temperance and suffrage, with a specialty in "scientific temperance." At a speech Brehm gave in Omaha, Nebraska, she argued that people who abstain from alcohol and maintain their health and physical condition have a better chance at success than those that do not. About six months before she died, Brehm predicted that cigarettes would be the target of a future eradication campaign. She cautioned students at her 1925 presentation in Honolulu, Hawaii, "The time will come when you will have to face the tobacco issue just as the world has faced the slavery question and the liquor problem ..."

== Political career ==
=== Local and national political involvement ===
Prior to Brehm's vice presidential run, she had an active political life. She was the First Vice President of the 1912 Women's Legislative Council of California conference in San Francisco. The Council was a non-partisan, non-sectarian group which sought to secure better laws for women and children, better public welfare measures, and laws that cater to improved moral, economic, and social conditions.

Brehm was appointed by two United States presidents to represent the United States on temperance. In 1909, President William H. Taft appointed her to speak at the World's Anti-Alcoholic Congress in London. In 1913, President Woodrow Wilson appointed her as a delegate to the World Anti-Alcohol Congress in Milan, Italy, where she argued for scientific temperance.

Additionally, Brehm spoke before both the Senate and the House of Representatives, and authored a petition urging Congress to create a Department of Education.

=== 1916 Prohibition Party National Convention ===
Brehm was approached to run as the Prohibition Party's vice presidential candidate twice before her 1924 nomination, in 1916 and 1920, but declined at those times. At the 1916 Prohibition Party National Convention in St. Paul, Minnesota, Brehm proclaimed that the monument of former WCTU president Frances Willard in the National Statuary Hall was a prophecy that some day a woman would be in the Capitol Building, not as a statue, but in power. Although Brehm was considered for the vice president candidacy at the time, she withdrew her name from the nomination, believing Ira Landrith would make a better candidate as he had a strong constituency in the south. Activists Mary Harris Armor and Ella A. Boole were also considered for the vice presidency nomination, and women played a crucial role within the party. More than a hundred women delegates and an equal number of alternates attended the convention and held women's conferences throughout the event.

=== The National Party ===
Brehm enjoyed a brief stint as vice chairman of the nascent National Party in 1918, the only woman to hold the position at that time. The party was involved in both temperance and women's suffrage and had equality built into its structure. One man and one woman from every state served on its National Committee. Suffrage was one of the primary tenets of the party platform, stating "the National Party regards equal suffrage as the first step toward the attainment of political democracy, and the first plank in our platform demands the submission of the Federal Suffrage Amendment and pledges the party to aid in the ratification campaigns." At the National Party Convention telegrams were sent to President Wilson and United States Senators urging them to pass the Susan B. Anthony suffrage amendment.

=== 1920 Prohibition Party National Convention ===
Brehm was the first woman selected as permanent chairman of a national political convention at the 1920 Prohibition Party National Convention in Lincoln, Nebraska. Although she was considered a nominee for both the vice president and presidential candidacies, and was endorsed through the primary elections of Wisconsin, North Dakota, Minnesota and Illinois, she declined once again, choosing to focus on her State Senate run. Instead, she offered a resolution nominating William Jennings Bryan for the presidency. This broke precedent and disrupted the convention program by selecting a candidate on the first day. The resolution was enthusiastically supported, and Bryan was nominated by acclamation.

These events followed the Democratic Convention earlier that month, during which James M. Cox was nominated for president and Franklin D. Roosevelt was nominated for vice president. Upon hearing of Bryan's nomination by the Prohibition Party, Cox's aides scrambled to encourage Bryan to decline, fearing potential Cox supporters may favor Bryan instead. Further, it was not yet certain whether Bryan would publicly declare his support for Cox. Democratic strategists acknowledged that if Bryan threatened to accept the Prohibition nomination, it would pressure Cox to declare support of the prohibition platform. Ultimately, however, Bryan declined the nomination, perhaps because after he had lost three times on a major party ticket, he feared losing a fourth time on a minor party ticket.

Bryan sent a telegraph to the convention declaring he could not accept the nomination, but the resolution passed anyway. Bryan's brother, Charles W. Bryan, sent a letter to the convention and was invited to appear to explain the refusal. As the convention considered new candidates upon Bryan's refusal, party leaders continued to attempt to persuade him. Ultimately, the nomination went to Aaron S. Watkins for president and D. Leigh Colvin for vice president.

=== 1920 California State Senate run ===
In 1920, Brehm was nominated by the Democratic and Prohibition parties to run for California State Senate for the Thirty-third District. The primary tenets of her platform were a complete abolition of alcohol trafficking, and supporting legislation that protected women and children. She ran a "spirited" campaign against her opponent, the incumbent Richard Rominger, as their race was the only one in which a woman was running. Many Los Angeles women's clubs campaigned for Brehm, eager to have a woman representing them in the State Legislature. As ballots were cast, Rominger maintained a healthy lead. Ultimately, he won the race with 64 percent of the votes.

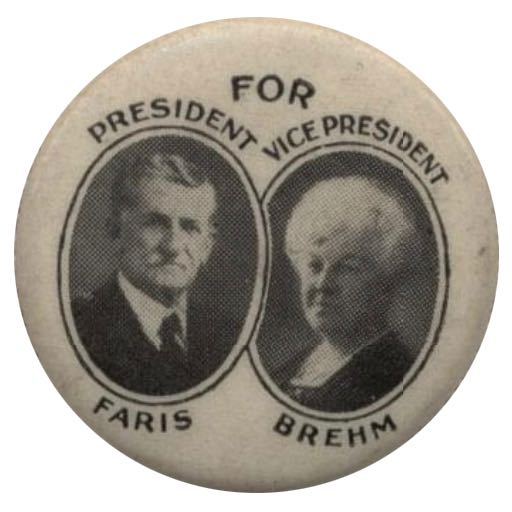
H.P. Faris and Marie C. Brehm campaign button from the 1924 Prohibition Party ticket

=== 1924 Vice presidential campaign ===
Brehm was the first female candidate to run for the vice-presidency of the United States after women were allowed to vote in national elections, thus enabling her to vote for herself. Marietta Stow had run for vice-president in 1884 on an all female ticket, but many argue that Brehm was the first to run legally, because of the passage of the 19th amendment in 1920. Brehm ran in 1924 on the ticket of the Prohibition Party running with Herman P. Faris. The vice presidential nominee was initially Dr. A.P. Gouthey, with Brehm in second, and Colonel A.L. Moudy in third. Gouthey withdrew and Brehm was nominated by acclamation.

Her running mate, H.P. Faris, praised her abilities during the campaign with several memorable comments:

"[Miss Brehm] is the peer of any candidate now running, although she doesn’t wear a skull cap or smoke an upside down pipe." "Why adopt a dry law then elect a wet nurse for it?"

== Personality and interests ==
Brehm was described as an eloquent and forceful speaker, but also one who lacked a sense of humor. Other contemporaneous reports, however, praised her presentations without complaint and noted her attributes approvingly, "Her platform work is forceful and pleasing. Her voice is strong but sympathetic. Her manner is easy, graceful and dignified. Her appearance is striking, her taste in dress exquisite and there is always apparent in look and action the high bred refined Christian woman." Another fan of her work noted that Brehm brought to her work "zeal tempered by wisdom, conviction softened by kindness and refinement strengthened by knowledge." "With a statesman's grasp of world-wide movements, a commanding finesence (finesse) and splendid voice, Miss Brehm wins her audiences with her first sentence and carries conviction in her arguments".

She was often counted on to provide music at club meetings and conventions as well as acting as the musical director of the WCTU from 1897 to 1901.

True to her belief in maintaining a healthy physical condition, Brehm enjoyed tennis, dancing, swimming, and rowing.

She also considered part of her mission to be the imposition of temperance on "nonchristian races" and "uncivilized people" around the world.

At the 1911 Prohibition Conference in The Hague, the Netherlands, she was a speaker on the same program as the headlining proponent of eugenics and temperance Dr. C.W. Saleeby.

At the Cincinnati meeting of the National WCTU, Brehm scolded the crowd for waving their handkerchiefs in the air as an enthusiastic response to favored speakers. Brehm felt the waving of soiled handkerchiefs was surely responsible for the frequency of colds among the conference attendees and admonished the participants to keep their personal handkerchiefs in their pockets and instead wave the small silk flags which had been provided for the express purpose of greeting the speakers.

== Later life and death ==
By 1917, Brehm had moved to Long Beach, California, a town which had been "dry" for the most part since its founding. While there, she shared her home with two single female boarders, a woman named Mary Kennedy as well as fellow Sandusky native Jessie Williams and became involved in local issues.

She became active in community affairs, with a stint on the Long Beach Planning Commission and on the Board of Directors of the City Club. She also supported the Community Hospital, and was a member of the Board of Deacons of the Second Presbyterian Church.

At the age of 66, Brehm died after being injured in the New Year's Day collapse of a Tournament of Roses grandstand in Pasadena, California. Of twelve eventual deaths attributed to the collapse, Brehm was the sixth fatality.

While some of the newspapers at the time reported her injuries as "minor" to "torn scalp and sprained left leg," or "deep scalp wounds" or even a compound fracture of the leg and head injuries, her death certificate listed the cause of death as "mitral regurgitation" with a contributing factor of "shock from accident on Jan. 1, 1926."

The accident resulted in a criminal trial with charges brought against the city inspector as well as the builder of the temporary grandstand. Brehm's host for the Rose Parade viewing was Charles Campbell, an old friend who resided in Pasadena and whose family she had visited during a Hawaiian speaking tour the year before. At trial, Campbell related his unease at seeing the flimsy construction for the chosen grandstand and his hesitation on moving forward with tickets for that viewing location. However, he moved forward with the original plan and seating location, despite his "premonition" and was seriously injured himself (either Campbell exaggerated in court or the initial or later newspaper reports were flawed since he was initially reported with minor injuries treated at home) as well as the eventually fatal injuries to his friend, Brehm.

She was cremated in Long Beach and is buried in Oakland Cemetery in Sandusky, Ohio. Although she died on January 21, 1926, her tombstone incorrectly lists 1925 as the year of her death.

During the probate process after Brehm's death, it was discovered that the name of one of the beneficiaries of her will (Algerian Mission Band) did not match the name as it was written in Brehm's will (the Algerian Mission of North Africa). This caused Brehm's younger sister, Mrs. Elizabeth C. Forth to contest the will and argue that the funds meant for the Algerian Missionaries should instead go to Brehm's surviving siblings. According to contemporaneous reports, Elizabeth Forth also took exception with the distribution of funds to mission work for "Mexicans in the Los Angeles Presbytary", as well as other contributions to missionary organizations. In the details of the report of the ruling of Division One, District Court of Appeals, it was stated that Brehm's wishes should be respected, despite the fact that she had used the common name of the beneficiary organization rather than its legal name.

Party political offices
Preceded by D. Leigh Colvin	Prohibition Party Vice Presidential candidate 1924 (lost)	Succeeded by James A. Edgerton
