= 1924 United States presidential election =

Election of Calvin Coolidge

- November 4, 1924

531 members of the Electoral College 266 electoral votes needed to win
- Turnout: 48.9% (▼0.3 pp)

Nominee	Calvin Coolidge	John W. Davis	Robert M. La Follette
Party	Republican	Democratic	Progressive
Alliance			Parties: Socialist; Farmer–Labor; Nonpartisan League
Home state	Massachusetts	West Virginia	Wisconsin
Running mate	Charles G. Dawes (Note: Frank O. Lowden had originally been nominated as Coolidge's running mate; however, Lowden declined the nomination and Dawes was chosen instead.)	Charles W. Bryan	Burton K. Wheeler
Electoral vote	382	136	13
States carried	35	12	1
Popular vote	15,723,789	8,386,242	4,831,706
Percentage	54.0%	28.8%	16.6%
- Presidential election results map. Red denotes states won by Coolidge/Dawes, blue denotes those won by Davis/Bryan, light green denotes Wisconsin, the state won by La Follette/Wheeler. Numbers indicate the number of electoral votes allotted to each state.
President before election
Calvin Coolidge
Republican
Elected President
Calvin Coolidge
Republican

A presidential election was held in the United States on November 4, 1924. The Republican ticket of incumbent President Calvin Coolidge and former Director of the Bureau of the Budget Charles G. Dawes defeated the Democratic ticket of former ambassador John W. Davis and Nebraska Governor Charles W. Bryan and the Progressive ticket of Senator Robert M. La Follette and Senator Burton K Wheeler. Coolidge was the second vice president, after Theodore Roosevelt, to ascend to the presidency and then win a full term.

Coolidge had been vice president under Warren G. Harding and became president in 1923 upon Harding's unexpected death. Coolidge was given credit for a booming economy at home and no visible crises abroad, and he faced little opposition at the 1924 Republican National Convention. The Democratic Party nominated former Congressman and ambassador to the United Kingdom John W. Davis of West Virginia. Davis, a compromise candidate, triumphed on the 103rd ballot of the 1924 Democratic National Convention after a deadlock between supporters of William Gibbs McAdoo and Al Smith. Dissatisfied by the conservatism of both major party candidates, the newly formed Progressive Party nominated Senator Robert M. La Follette of Wisconsin.

The election has been characterized as marking the "high tide of American conservatism", as both major-party candidates campaigned for limited government, reduced taxes, and less regulation. By contrast, La Follette called for the gradual nationalization of the railroads and increased taxes on the wealthy, policies that foreshadowed the New Deal.

Coolidge won a landslide victory, taking majorities in both the popular vote and the Electoral College and winning almost every state outside of the Solid South (while still making headway by winning Kentucky). La Follette won 16.6% of the popular vote, a strong showing for a third-party candidate, while Davis won the lowest share of the popular vote of any Democratic nominee in history. This is the most recent election to date in which there was less that 50% turnout, the last where a third-party candidate won a non-Southern state, and the last time a Republican or any major-party nominee won the presidency without winning any of the former Confederate states. It was also the US election with the lowest per capita voter turnout since records were kept. Also, it was the only election from 1868 to 1952 in which none of the candidates were from New York or Ohio.

== Nominations ==
=== Republican Party nomination ===
Republican Party (United States) 1924 Republican Party ticket
Calvin Coolidge	Charles G. Dawes
for President	for Vice President
30th President of the United States (1923–1929)	1st Director of the Bureau of the Budget (1921–1922)

Republican candidates

President
Calvin Coolidge

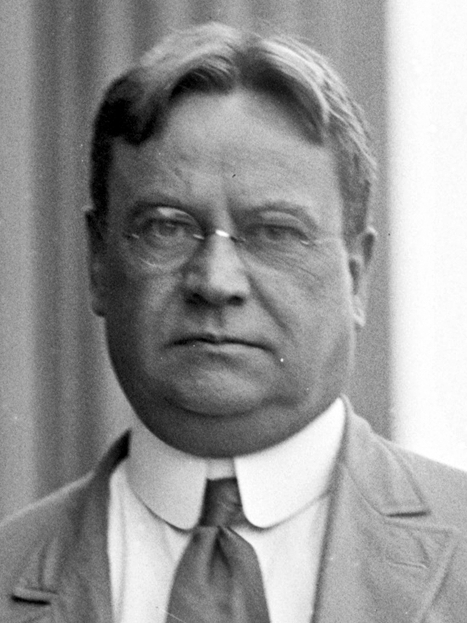
Senator
Hiram Johnson
from California

Senator
Robert M. La Follette
from Wisconsin

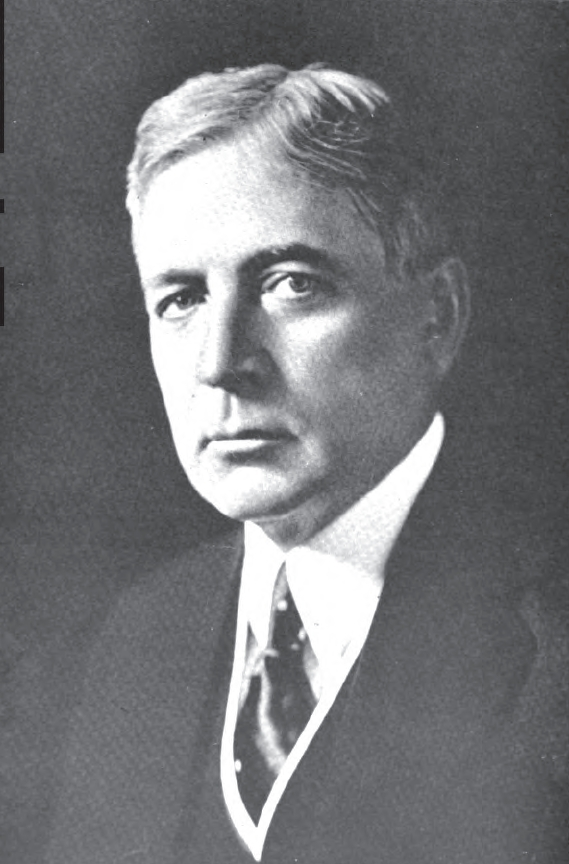
Governor
Frank Orren Lowden
of Illinois
(Declined to contest)

The Republican Convention was held in Cleveland, Ohio, from June 10 to 12, with the easy choice of nominating incumbent President Coolidge for a full term of his own. Coolidge won with only token competition from Senators Robert M. La Follette and Hiram Johnson, both members of the party's progressive wing; an attempt to have Coolidge's nomination declared unanimous failed when La Follette's delegates refused to support Coolidge.

Former Illinois Governor Frank Orren Lowden was nominated as Coolidge's running mate, but he declined the honor, a unique event in 20th-century American political history. Charles G. Dawes, a prominent Republican businessman, was nominated for vice-president instead.

1924 RNC presidential ballot (1)	1924 RNC vice presidential ballots (1–3)					
Presidential ballot	1	Vice presidential ballot	1	2 Before shifts	2 After shifts	3
Calvin Coolidge	1065	Charles G. Dawes	149	111	49	682.5
Robert M. La Follette	34	Frank Orren Lowden	222	413	766	0
Hiram Johnson	10	Theodore E. Burton	139	288	94	0
		Herbert Hoover	0	0	0	234.5
		William S. Kenyon	172	95	68	75
		George Scott Graham	81	0	0	0
		James Eli Watson	79	55	7	45
		Charles Curtis	56	31	24	0
		Arthur M. Hyde	55	36	36	0
		George W. Norris	35	0	0	0
		Smith W. Brookhart	0	31	0	0
		Frank T. Hines	28	1	0	0
		Charles A. March	28	0	0	0
		J. Will Taylor	21	20	27	27
		William Purnell Jackson	23	0	0	10
		Charles B. Warren	10	1	23	14
		T. Coleman du Pont	0	0	3	11
		Joseph M. Dixon	6	0	0	2
		Everett Sanders	0	0	0	4
		James Harbord	1	0	0	3
		Albert J. Beveridge	0	0	0	2
		John L. Coulter	1	0	0	1
		William Wrigley	1	0	0	1
		John J. Pershing	0	0	0	0

=== Democratic Party nomination ===
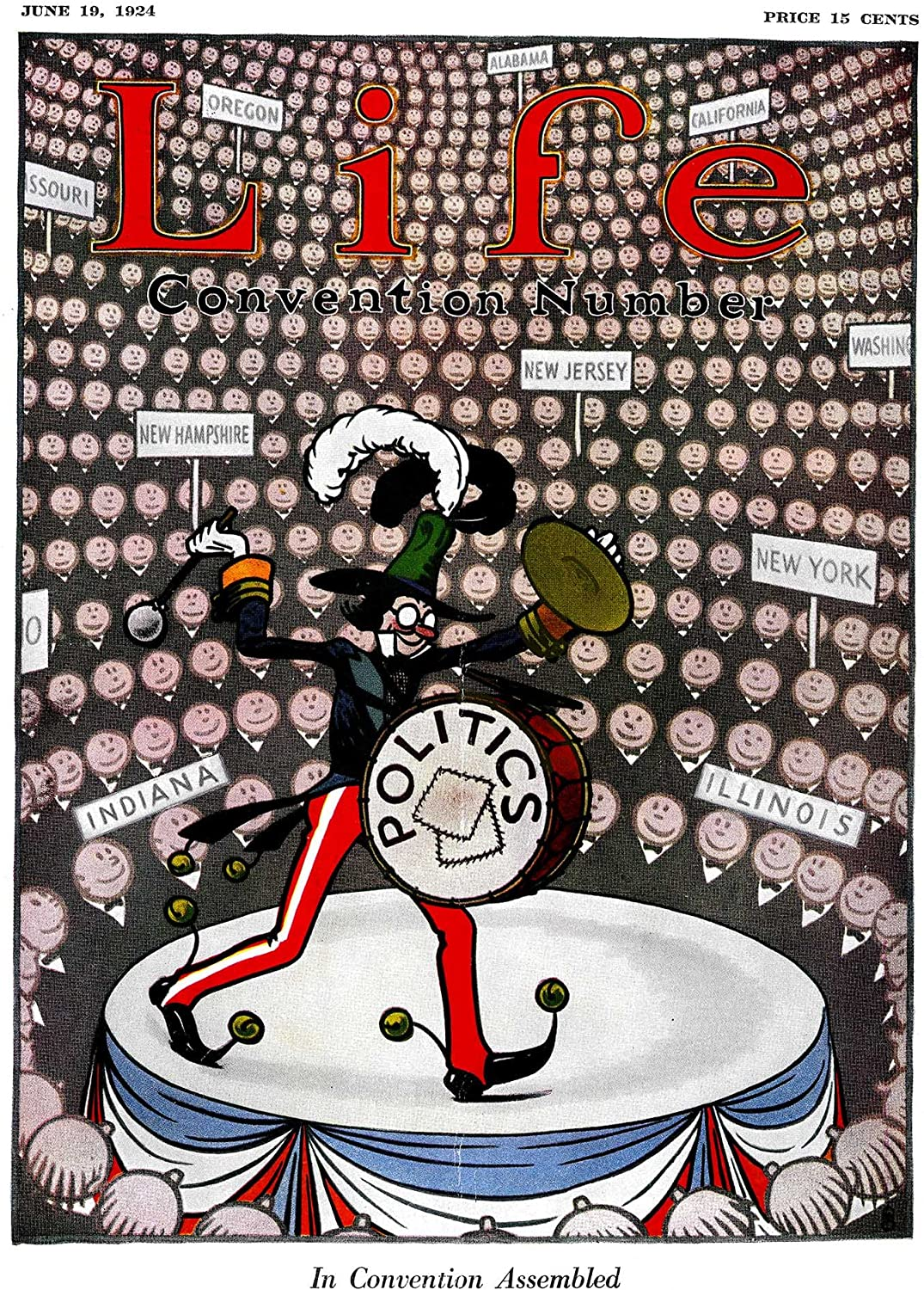
Cover of Life, 19 Jun 1924

Democratic Party (United States) 1924 Democratic Party ticket
John W. Davis	Charles W. Bryan
for President	for Vice President
U.S. Ambassador to the United Kingdom (1918–1921)	20th Governor of Nebraska (1923–1925)

Democratic candidates:

John W. Davis
from West Virginia,
Former Ambassador
to the United Kingdom

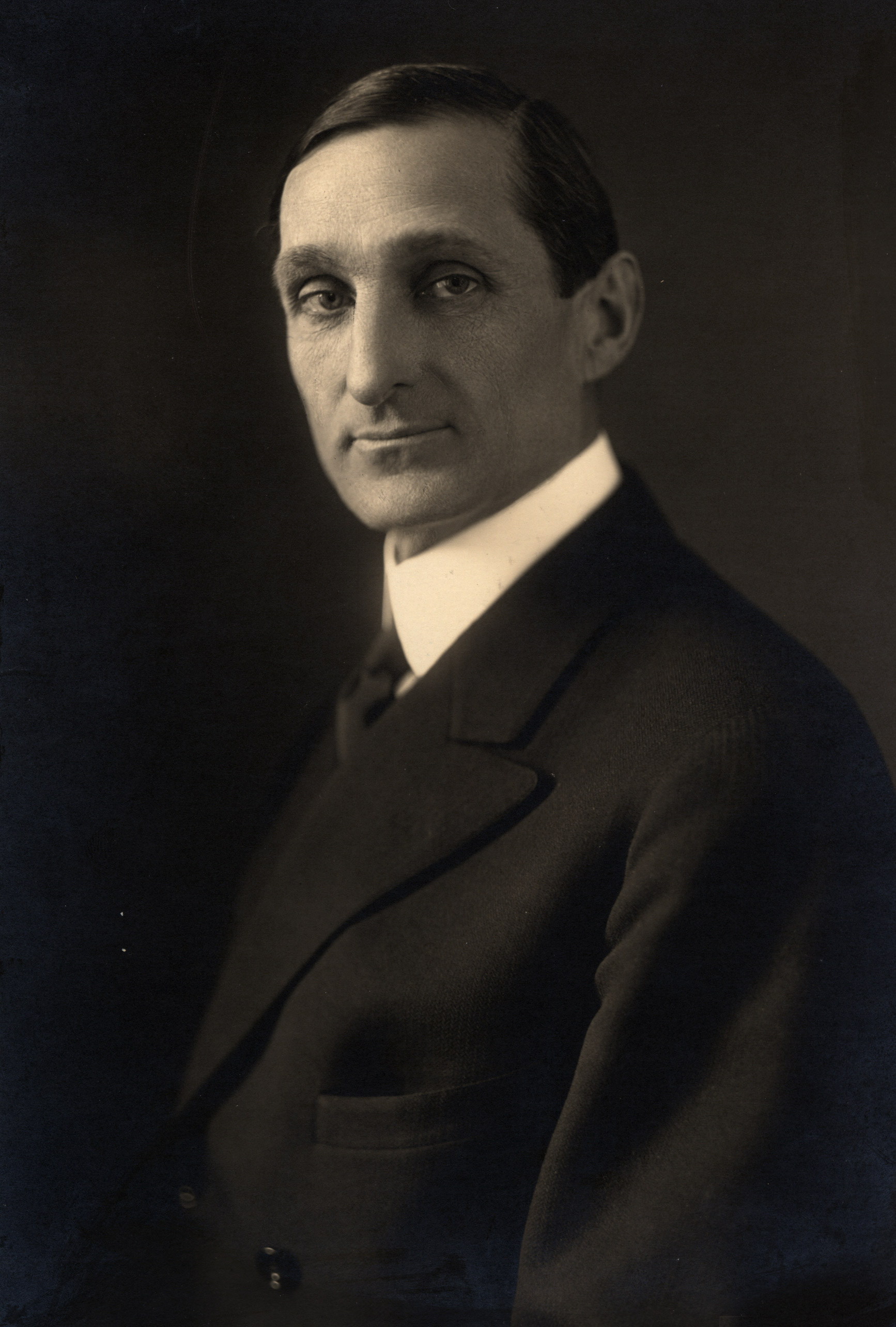
William Gibbs McAdoo
from California,
Former Secretary
of the Treasury

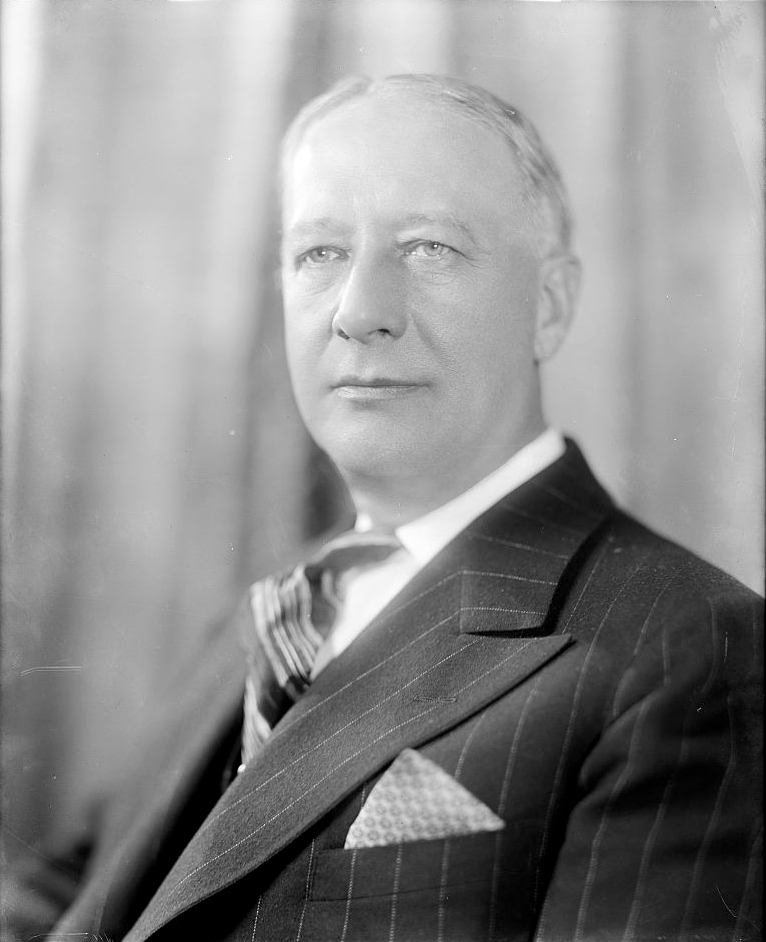
Governor
Al Smith
of New York
(campaign)

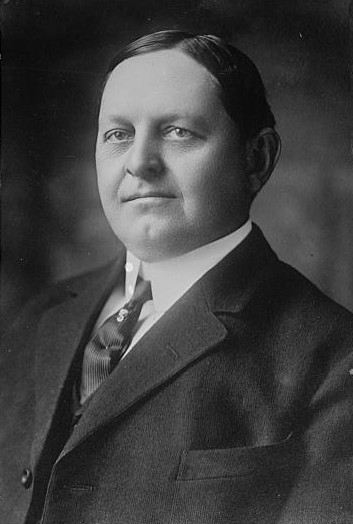
Senator
Oscar Underwood
from Alabama

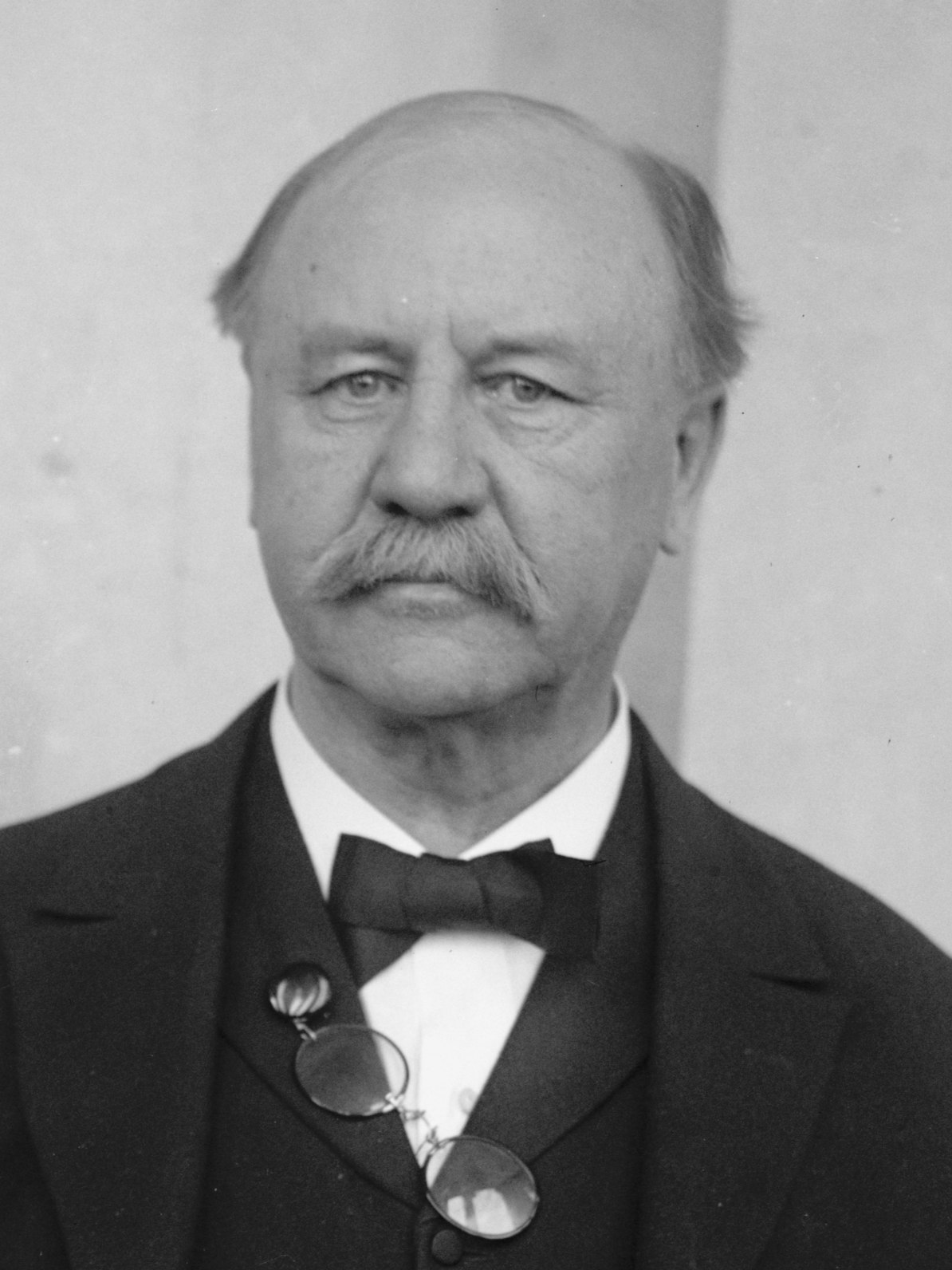
Senator
Samuel M. Ralston
from Indiana

Former Governor
James M. Cox
of Ohio

While the Democratic Party had been largely able to unite around strong leaders including Grover Cleveland, William Jennings Bryan, and Woodrow Wilson during the previous four decades, the party had become increasingly fragmented and factionalized during the first half of the 1920s. By 1924, Cleveland and Wilson were both dead, and Bryan had largely left politics in favor of religious activism. Franklin D. Roosevelt, the party's vice-presidential candidate at the previous election had been looked at as a potential unifying figure able to appeal to all sides of the party, but he had fallen severely ill and been left paralysed in 1921. Though his health had generally recovered by 1924, he believed he could still eventually regain full use of his legs and resolved not to put himself forward as a presidential candidate until he had done so.

The 1924 Democratic National Convention was held in New York City from June 24 to July 9. The two leading candidates were William Gibbs McAdoo of California, former Secretary of the Treasury and son-in-law of former President Woodrow Wilson, and Governor Al Smith of New York. The balloting revealed a clear geographic and cultural split in the party, as McAdoo was supported mostly by rural, Protestant delegates from the South, West, and small-town Midwest who were supporters of Prohibition (called "drys"). In some cases, McAdoo's delegates were also supporters of the Ku Klux Klan (KKK), which was at its peak of nationwide popularity in the 1920s, with chapters in all 48 states and 4 to 5 million members. Governor Smith was supported by the anti-Prohibition forces (called "wets"), many Roman Catholics and other ethnic minorities, big-city delegates in the Northeast and urban Midwest, and by liberal delegates opposed to the influence of the Ku Klux Klan.

An example of the deep split within the party came in a brutal floor fight over a proposal to publicly condemn the Klan. Most of McAdoo's delegates in the South and West opposed the motion, while most of Smith's big-city delegates supported it. In the end the motion failed to carry by a single vote. William Jennings Bryan, the three-time Democratic presidential candidate, argued against condemning the Klan for fear that it would permanently split the party. Wendell Willkie, who would go on to become the Republican Party's 1940 presidential candidate, was a Democratic delegate in 1924, and he supported the proposal to condemn the KKK. The bitter fight between the McAdoo and Smith delegates over the KKK set the stage for the nominating ballots to come. Most of the ensuing ballots followed a pattern of having McAdoo leading, Smith second, Davis third, and 1920 candidate James M. Cox fourth, followed by various favorite son candidates.

Due to the two-thirds rule governing nominations, neither McAdoo, who briefly got a majority of the votes halfway through the balloting, nor Smith was able to get the two-thirds majority necessary to win. However, neither candidate would back down, and so the deadlock continued for days on end, as ballot after ballot was taken with neither McAdoo or Smith getting close to enough delegates to win the nomination. Cox withdrew after the 64th ballot, only for his support to split relatively evenly between the three frontrunners, leaving the situation no closer to being resolved. Eventually the convention would go to over 100 ballots, becoming the longest-running political convention in American history. Humorist Will Rogers joked that New York had invited the Democratic delegates to visit the city, not to live there. As the convention approached the hundredth ballot, a movement to draft Indiana senator Samuel M. Ralston gained traction and began to look like it might break the deadlock; Ralston, who had been content for his name to be put forward purely as a favorite son candidate, quickly sent the convention a message stating that due to his poor health, he could not accept the nomination.

Due to the great divide in the Democratic Party, the convention could have gone on for a great deal longer. However, with some state delegations running low on money and unable to stay in the city any longer, on the 100th ballot both Smith and McAdoo mutually withdrew as candidates. This allowed the convention's delegates to search for a compromise candidate acceptable to both Smith and McAdoo supporters. Finally, on the 103rd ballot, the exhausted convention turned to John W. Davis, a former Congressman from West Virginia, former Solicitor General of the United States, and former United States Ambassador to the United Kingdom, as the presidential nominee. The Democrats' disarray prompted Will Rogers's famous quip: "I'm not a member of any organized political party, I'm a Democrat!"

Governor of Nebraska Charles W. Bryan, William Jennings Bryan's brother, was nominated for vice-president in order to gain the support of the party's rural voters, many of whom still saw Bryan as their leader.

(1-20)	Presidential Ballot																			
	1st	2nd	3rd	4th	5th	6th	7th	8th	9th	10th	11th	12th	13th	14th	15th	16th	17th	18th	19th	20th
J.W. Davis	31	32	34	34	34.5	55.5	55	57	63	57.5	59	60	64.5	64.5	61	63	64	66	84.5	122
McAdoo	431.5	431	437	443.6	443.1	443.1	442.6	444.6	444.6	471.6	476.3	478.5	477	475.5	479	478	471.5	470.5	474	432
Smith	241	251.5	255.5	260	261	261.5	261.5	273.5	278	299.5	303.2	301	303.5	306.5	305.5	305.5	312.5	312.5	311.5	307.5
Cox	59	61	60	59	59	59	59	60	60	60	60	60	60	60	60	60	60	60	60	60
Harrison	43.5	23.5	23.5	20.5	20.5	20.5	20.5	20.5	20.5	31.5	20.5	21.5	20.5	20.5	20.5	0	0	0	0	0
Underwood	42.5	42	42	41.5	41.5	42.5	42.5	48	45.5	43.9	42.5	41.5	40.5	40.5	39.5	41.5	42	39.5	39.5	45.5
Silzer	38	30	28	28	28	28	28	28	28	0	0	0	0	0	0	0	0	0	0	0
Ferris	30	30	30	30	30	30	30	6.5	0	0	0	0	0	0	0	0	0	0	0	0
Ralston	30	30	30	30	30	30	30	30	30.5	30.5	32.5	31.5	31.5	31	31	31	30	30	31	30
Glass	25	25	29	45	25	25	25	26	25	25	25.5	26	25	24	25	25	44	30	30	25
Ritchie	22.5	21.5	22.5	21.5	42.9	22.9	20.9	19.9	17.5	17.5	17.5	17.5	17.5	17.5	17.5	17.5	17.5	18.5	17.5	17.5
Robinson	21	41	41	19	19	19	19	21	21	20	20	19	19	19	20	46	28	22	22	21
J.M. Davis	20	23	20	29	28	27	30	29	32.4	12	11	13.5	11	11	11	11	10	10	9	10
C.W. Bryan	18	18	19	19	19	18	18	16	15	12	11	11	10	11	11	11	11	11	10	11
Brown	17	12.5	12.5	9.9	8.5	8	8	9	8	8	9	9	9	9	9	1	0	0	0	0
Sweet	12	12	0	0	0	0	0	0	0	0	0	0	0	0	0	0	0	0	0	0
Saulsbury	7	6	6	6	6	6	6	6	6	6	6	6	6	6	6	6	6	6	6	6
Kendrick	6	6	6	0	0	0	0	0	0	0	0	0	0	0	0	0	0	0	0	0
Thompson	1	1	1	1	1	1	1	1	1	1	1	1	0	0	0	0	0	0	0	0
Walsh	0	1	1	1	1	1	1	1	1	1	1	1	1	1	1	1	1	2	2	8
W.J. Bryan	0	0	0	0	0	0	0	1	1	0	0	0	0	0	0	0	0	0	0	0
Baker	0	0	0	0	0	0	0	0	0	1	1	0	1	1	1	0	0	0	0	1
Berry	0	0	0	0	0	0	0	0	0	0	1	0	0	0	0	0	0	0	0	0
Krebs	0	0	0	0	0	0	0	0	0	0	0	0	1	0	0	0	0	0	0	0
Copeland	0	0	0	0	0	0	0	0	0	0	0	0	0	0	0	0.5	0.5	0	1	0
Hull	0	0	0	0	0	0	0	0	0	0	0	0	0	0	0	0	0	20	0	0
Hitchcock	0	0	0	0	0	0	0	0	0	0	0	0	0	0	0	0	0	0	0	1
Dever	0	0	0	0	0	0	0	0	0	0	0	0	0	0	0	0	0	0	0	0.5

(21–40)	Presidential Ballot																			
	21st	22nd	23rd	24th	25th	26th	27th	28th	29th	30th	31st	32nd	33rd	34th	35th	36th	37th	38th	39th	40th
J.W. Davis	125	123.5	129.5	129.5	126	125	128.5	126	124.5	126.5	127.5	128	121	107.5	107	106.5	107	105	71	70
McAdoo	439	438.5	438.5	438.5	436.5	415.5	413	412	415	415.5	415.5	415.5	404.5	445	439	429	444.5	444	499	506.4
Smith	307.5	307.5	308	308	308.5	311.5	316.5	316.5	321	323.5	322.5	322	310.5	311	323.5	323	321	321	320.5	315.1
Cox	60	60	60	60	59	59	59	59	59	57	57	57	57	54	50	55	55	55	55	55
Underwood	45.5	45.5	39.5	39.5	39.5	39.5	39.5	39.5	39.5	39.5	39.5	39.5	39.5	39.5	39.5	39.5	39.5	39.5	38.5	41.5
Ralston	30	32	32	33	31	32	32	34	34	33	32	32	32	31	33	33.5	32	32	32	31
Glass	24	25	30	29	29	29	29	25	25	24	24	24	24	24	29	24	24	24	25	24
Robinson	22	22	23	22	23	23	23	24	23	23	24	24	23	24	24	24	24	24	23	24
Ritchie	17.5	17.5	17.5	17.5	17.5	17.5	18.5	18.5	17.5	17.5	16.5	16.5	16.5	16.5	16.5	16.5	17.5	17.5	18.5	17.5
Saulsbury	12	12	6	6	6	6	6	6	6	6	6	6	6	6	6	6	6	6	6	6
Walsh	8	8.5	8	9	16	14	7	7	1.5	1.5	2.5	3.5	2.5	1.5	0.5	0.5	0.5	1.5	1	0
J.M. Davis	5	5	5	5	5	5	6	6	6	6	6	6	6	3	3	3	3	4	3	3
Baker	1	0	0	0	0	0	0	0	0	0	0	0	0	0	0	0	0	0	0	0
Miller	0.5	0	0	0	0	0	0	0	0	0	0	0	0	0	0	0	0	0	0	0
Pomerene	0	0	0	1	0	0	0	0	0	0	0	0	0	0	0	0	0	0	0	0
Owen	0	0	0	0	0	20	20	24	24	25	25	24	25	5	25	25	24	24	4	4
Daniels	0	0	0	0	0	0	0	1	1	0	0	0	0	0	0	0	0	0	0	0
Martin	0	0	0	0	0	0	0	0	1	0	0	0	0	0	0	0	0	0	0	0
Gaston	0	0	0	0	0	0	0	0	0	0	0	0	0.5	0	0	0	0	0	0	0
Gerard	0	0	0	0	0	0	0	0	0	0	0	0	0	0	1	1	0	0	0	0
Doheny	0	0	0	0	0	0	0	0	0	0	0	0	0	0	0	1	0	0	0	0
Jackson	0	0	0	0	0	0	0	0	0	0	0	0	0	0	0	0	0	0	1	0

(41–60)	Presidential Ballot																			
	41st	42nd	43rd	44th	45th	46th	47th	48th	49th	50th	51st	52nd	53rd	54th	55th	56th	57th	58th	59th	60th
J.W. Davis	70	67	71	71	73	71	70.5	70.5	63.5	64	67.5	59	63	62	62.5	58.5	58.5	40.5	60	60
McAdoo	504.9	503.4	483.4	484.4	483.4	486.9	484.4	483.5	462.5	461.5	442.5	413.5	423.5	427	426.5	430	430	495	473.5	469.5
Smith	317.6	318.6	319.1	319.1	319.1	319.1	320.1	321	320.5	320.5	328	320.5	320.5	320.5	320.5	320.5	320.5	331.5	331.5	330.5
Cox	55	56	54	54	54	54	54	54	53	54	55	54	54	54	54	54	54	54	54	54
Underwood	39.5	39.5	40	39	38	37.5	38.5	38.5	42	42.5	43	38.5	42.5	40	40	39.5	39.5	38	40	42
Ralston	30	30	31	31	31	31	31	31	57	58	63	93	94	92	97	97	97	40.5	42.5	42.5
Glass	24	28.5	24	24	24	24	24	25	25	24	25	24	25	24	24	25	25	25	25	25
Robinson	24	23	44	44	44	44	45	44	45	44	43	42	43	43	43	43	43	23	23	23
Ritchie	17.5	17.5	17.5	17.5	17.5	16.5	16.5	16.5	16.5	16.5	16.5	16.5	16.5	17.5	16.5	16.5	16.5	16.5	16.5	16.5
Saulsbury	6	6	6	6	6	6	6	6	6	6	6	6	6	6	6	6	6	6	6	6
Owen	4	4	4	4	4	4	4	4	4	4	4	4	4	3	4	4	4	4	24	24
J.M. Davis	3	3	3	2	3	3	3	3	2	2	2	0	0	0	0	0	0	0	0	0
Cummings	1	0	0	0	0	0	0	0	0	0	0	0	0	0	0	0	0	0	0	0
Spellacy	1	1	0	0	0	0	0	0	0	0	0	0	0	0	0	0	0	0	0	0
Walsh	0	0	1	1	1	1	1	1	1	1	2.5	1	0	1	1	1	1	1	0	3
Edwards	0	0	0	1	0	0	0	0	0	0	0	0	0	0	0	0	0	0	0	0
C.W. Bryan	0	0	0	0	0	0	0	0	0	0	0	6	6	7	3	3	3	3	2	2
Battle	0	0	0	0	0	0	0	0	0	0	0	0	0	20	0	0	0	0	0	0
Roosevelt	0	0	0	0	0	0	0	0	0	0	0	0	0	1	0	0	0	0	0	0
Behrman	0	0	0	0	0	0	0	0	0	0	0	0	0.5	0	0	0	0	0	0	0

(61–80)	Presidential Ballot																			
	61st	62nd	63rd	64th	65th	66th	67th	68th	69th	70th	71st	72nd	73rd	74th	75th	76th	77th	78th	79th	80th
J.W. Davis	60	60.5	62	61.5	71.5	74.5	75.5	72.5	64	67	67	65	66	78.5	78.5	75.5	76.5	73.5	71	73.5
McAdoo	469.5	469	446.5	488.5	492	495	490	488.5	530	528.5	528.5	527.5	528	510	513	513	513	511	507.5	454.5
Smith	335.5	338.5	315.5	325	336.5	338.5	336.5	336.5	335	334	334.5	334	335	364	366	368	367	363.5	366.5	367.5
Cox	54	49	49	54	1	0	0	0	0	0	0	0	0	1	1	1	1	0	0	0
Underwood	42	40	39.5	39.5	40	39.5	46.5	46.5	38	37.5	37.5	37.5	38.5	47	46.5	47.5	47.5	49	50	46.5
Ralston	37.5	38.5	56	1	0	0	0	0	0	0	0	0	0	3.5	4.5	4.5	6.5	5	4	5
Glass	25	26	25	25	25	25	25	26	25	25	25	25	25	28	28	29	27	21	17	68
Owen	24	24	24	24	24	22	22	22	2	2	2	2	2	2	4	4	4	0	0	1
Robinson	23	23	23	24	23	21	21	21	21	21	21	21	21	23	25	25	24	22.5	28.5	29.5
Ritchie	16.5	16.5	16.5	16.5	16.5	16.5	16.5	16.5	16.5	16.5	16.5	16.5	16.5	16.5	16.5	16.5	16.5	16.5	16.5	16.5
Saulsbury	6	6	6	6	6	6	6	6	6	6	6	6	6	7	6	6	6	6	6	6
C.W. Bryan	2	4	4	3	3	2	3	3	2	3	2	2	3	4	4	4	4	3	3	4.5
Walsh	3	3	3	3	3	3	2	1	0	0	1	2	2	4.5	2	2	2	6	6	4
Ferris	0	0	28	24.5	6.5	0	0	0	0	0	0	0	0	0	0	0	0	17	18	17.5
Walsh	0	0	0	2.5	0	0	0	0	0	0	0	0	0	0	0	0	0	0	0	0
Baker	0	0	0	0	48	55	54	57	56	56	56	57.5	54	5	2	1	1	0	0	0
Wheeler	0	0	0	0	2	0	0	0	0	0	0	0	0	20	0	0	0	0	0	0
Rogers	0	0	0	0	0	0	0	1	0	0	0	0	0	0	0	0	0	0	0	0
Coolidge	0	0	0	0	0	0	0	0.5	0	0	0	0	0	0	0	0	0	0	0	0
Daniels	0	0	0	0	0	0	0	0	2.5	0	0	0	0	0	0	0	0	0	0	1
Kevin	0	0	0	0	0	0	0	0	0	0	0	0	0	1	0	0	0	0	0	0
Roosevelt	0	0	0	0	0	0	0	0	0	0	0	0	0	0	0	0	1	1	1	1
Gerard	0	0	0	0	0	0	0	0	0	0	0	0	0	0	0	0	0	1	1	0

(81–100)	Presidential Ballot																			
	81st	82nd	83rd	84th	85th	86th	87th	88th	89th	90th	91st	92nd	93rd	94th	95th	96th	97th	98th	99th	100th
J.W. Davis	70.5	71	72.5	66	68	65.5	66.5	59.5	64.5	65.5	66.5	69.5	68	81.75	139.25	171.5	183.25	194.75	210	203.5
McAdoo	432	413.5	418	388.5	380.5	353.5	336.5	315.5	318.5	314	318	310	314	395	417.5	421	415.5	406.5	353.5	190
Smith	365	366	368	365	363	360	361.5	362	357	354.5	355.5	355.5	355.5	364.5	367.5	359.5	359.5	354	354	351.5
Glass	73	78	76	72.5	67.5	72.5	71	66.5	66.5	30.5	28.5	26.5	27	37	34	39	39	36	38	35
Underwood	48	49	48.5	40.5	40.5	38	38	39	41	42.5	46.5	45.25	44.75	46.25	44.25	38.5	37.25	38.25	39.5	41.5
Robinson	29.5	28.5	27.5	25	27.5	25	20.5	23	20.5	20	20	20	19	37	31	32	22	25	25	46
Owen	21	21	20	20	20	20	20	20	20	0	0	0	0	0	0	0	1	1	3	20
Ritchie	16.5	16.5	16.5	16.5	16.5	23.5	23	22.5	22.5	16.5	16.5	16.5	16.5	16.5	20.5	21.5	19.5	18.5	17.5	17.5
Ferris	16	12	7.5	0	0	0	0	0	0	0	0	0	0	0	0	0	0	0	0	0
Walsh	7	4	4	1.5	3	5	4	5	3.5	5	4.5	4.5	4.5	4	2	4	4	6	4	52.5
Saulsbury	6	6	6	6	6	6	6	6	6	6	6	6	6	0	0	0	6	6	6	6
C.W. Bryan	4.5	4.5	5.5	6.5	9.5	7	7	9	9	15	8	8	8	9	9	7	6	5	5	2
Ralston	4	24	24	86	87	92	93	98	100.5	159.5	187.5	196.75	196.25	37	0	0	0	0	0	0
Barnett	1	0	0	0	0	0	0	0	0	0	0	0	0	0	0	0	0	0	0	0
Daniels	1	1	0	0	0	0	0	23	19.5	19	0	0	0	0	0	0	0	0	0	24
Roosevelt	1	1	1	1	1	1	1	1	1	1	0	0	0	2	2	1	0	0	0	0
Miller	0	0	0	0	0	0	1	0	0	0	0	0	0	0	0	0	0	0	0	0
Wheeler	0	0	1	0	0	0	0	0	0	0	0	0	0	0	0	0	0	0	0	0
Coyne	0	0	0	1	0	0	0	0	0	0	0	0	0	0	0	0	0	0	0	0
Baker	0	0	0	0	6	0	0	0	0	0	0	0	2	0	0	0	0	0	0	4
Meredith	0	0	0	0	0	26	26	26	26	26	26	26	26	26	26	0	0	0	37	75.5
Maloney	0	0	0	0	0	1	0	0	0	0	0	0	0	0	0	0	0	0	0	0
J.M. Davis	0	0	0	0	0	0	20	20	20	22	4	0	0	20	0	0	0	0	0	0
Cox	0	0	0	0	0	0	0.5	0	0	0	0	0	0	0	0	0	0	0	0	0
Cummings	0	0	0	0	0	0	0	0	0	0	8.5	8.5	8.5	1	0	0	0	0	0	0
Houston	0	0	0	0	0	0	0	0	0	0	0	2	0	0	0	0	0	0	0	9
Callahan	0	0	0	0	0	0	0	0	0	0	0	1	0	0	0	0	0	0	0	0
Copeland	0	0	0	0	0	0	0	0	0	0	0	0	0	17	2	0	0	0	0	0
Stewart	0	0	0	0	0	0	0	0	0	0	0	0	0	1	0	0	0	0	0	0
Marshall	0	0	0	0	0	0	0	0	0	0	0	0	0	0	0	0	2	3	2	0
Berry	0	0	0	0	0	0	0	0	0	0	0	0	0	0	0	0	0	0	1	1
Gerard	0	0	0	0	0	0	0	0	0	0	0	0	0	0	0	0	0	0	0	10

(101–103)	Presidential Ballot			
	101st	102nd	103rd before shifts	103rd after shifts
J.W. Davis	316	415.5	575.5	844
Underwood	229.5	317	250.5	102.5
Walsh	98	123	84.5	58
Glass	59	67	79	23
Robinson	22.5	21	21	20
Meredith	130	66.5	42.5	15.5
McAdoo	52	21	14.5	11.5
Smith	121	44	10.5	7.5
Gerard	16	7	8	7
Hull	2	1	1	1
Daniels	1	2	1	0
Thompson	0	1	1	0
Berry	0	1.5	0	0
Allen	0	1	0	0
C.W. Bryan	0	1	0	0
Ritchie	0.5	0.5	0	0
Owen	23	0	0	0
Cummings	9	0	0	0
Houston	9	0	0	0
Murphree	4	0	0	0
Baker	1	0	0	0

Vice Presidential Ballot
First ballot	before shifts	after shifts
Governor C. W. Bryan	332	739
George Berry	270.5	212
Bennett Clark	–	42
Lena Springs	42	18
Colonel Alvin Owsley	–	16
Governor George S. Silzer	–	10
Mayor John F. Hylan	109	6
Governor Jonathan M. Davis	–	4

=== Progressive Party nomination ===
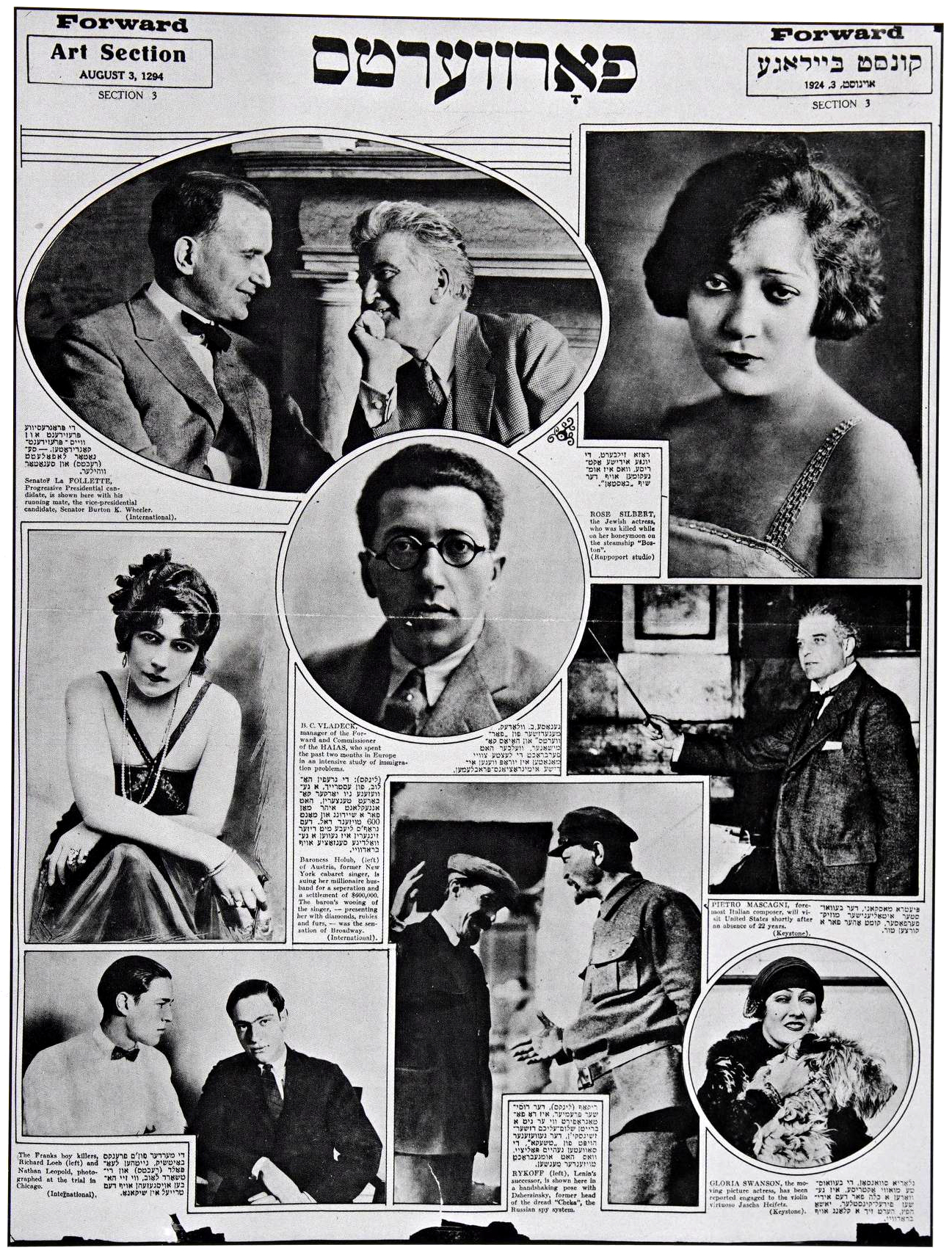
Cover of The Forward's art section, featuring Senators La Follette and Wheeler in the top left corner, 3 Aug 1924

1924 Progressive Party ticket
Robert M. La Follette	Burton K. Wheeler
for President	for Vice President
U.S. Senator from Wisconsin (1906–1925)	U.S. Senator from Montana (1923–1947)

Senator Robert M. La Follette, who had left the Republican Party and formed his own political party, the Progressive Party, in Wisconsin, was so upset over both political parties choosing conservative candidates that he decided to run as a third-party candidate to give liberals from both parties an alternative. He thus accepted the presidential nomination of the Progressive Party. A longtime champion of labor unions, and an ardent foe of Big Business, La Follette was a fiery orator who had dominated Wisconsin's political scene for more than two decades. Backed by radical farmers, the American Federation of Labor (AFL) labor unions, and Socialists, La Follette ran on a platform of nationalizing cigarette factories and other large industries. He also strongly supported increased taxation on the wealthy and the right of collective bargaining for factory workers. Despite a strong showing in labor strongholds and winning over 16% of the national popular vote, he carried only his home state of Wisconsin in the electoral college.

=== Prohibition Party nomination ===
1924 Prohibition Party ticket
Herman P. Faris	Marie C. Brehm
for President	for Vice President
Party Treasurer from Missouri	Activist from California

Candidates in this section are sorted by their highest vote count on the nominating ballots
A.P. Gouthey

Presbyterian Minister
from Washington
HCV: 40 votes

By 1924, the Prohibition Party was increasingly being regarded as an irrelevant single-issue party. With there still being little serious opposition to Prohibition in either of the main parties, the Prohibitionists had resorted to increasingly extreme rhetoric in an effort to distinguish themselves from the Republicans and Democrats, including advocating harsh punishments for people caught drinking or selling alcohol. They attempted to branch out into other, socially conservative policy areas in this election, including anti-immigrant sentiment, and advocating for religious instruction in public schools.

At the party's nominating convention, party treasurer Herman P. Faris was nominated over Presbyterian minister A.P. Gouthey. Gouthey was then proposed as Faris' running-mate and led on the first round of balloting for the vice-presidential nomination, but withdrew in favor of party activist Marie C. Brehm. Brehm became the first woman to run on a national party's presidential ticket since the passage of the Nineteenth Amendment to the United States Constitution, which made it definitively possible for women to serve in the office of President or Vice-President.

=== Workers (Communist) Party nomination ===
1924 Workers Party ticket
William Z. Foster	Benjamin Gitlow
for President	for Vice President
Trade Unionist from Massachusetts	State Assemblyman from New York (1918–1918)

The Communist Party USA, who had been founded in 1919, ran their first presidential ticket at this election, officially under the guise of the Workers Party of America. While there had been some initial suggestions that the party might endorse La Follette's candidacy, any prospect of this was ended when La Follette publicly repudiated the party and communism more generally.

Going into the party's first nominating convention the favorites for the nomination were C. E. Ruthenberg, the party's executive secretary, along with William Z. Foster and James P. Cannon, who were both prominent trade unionists and party activists. With Ruthenberg ultimately deciding not to put himself forward for the nomination, and Cannon withdrawing to become the party's candidate for governor of New York, Foster was left as the clear choice, and was formally declared the party's candidate for the presidency at the party's convention on July 10. Benjamin Gitlow, a former New York state assemblyman who had been jailed for pro-Communist activities in 1919 and was still serving the remainder of his sentence on parole, was chosen as Foster's running-mate. Foster's campaign put forward a platform based heavily on the policies that were then being used by the Soviet government of Joseph Stalin.

== General election ==
Calvin Coolidge at podium LCCN2016887418

=== Keep Cool with Coolidge ===
Backers of Coolidge incorporated the political stability of the era into the president's catchphrase for the campaign. The image of the quiet competence of Coolidge was seen as a strong positive in a time where Americans wanted to move past the destruction of the First World War and achieve "plenty" for themselves and their families. The era which began in 1920 with "Return to Normalcy", was seen as continuing through Coolidge and the pace of inventions of new comfort goods which increased the quality of life of middle class Americans were seen as signs that a Republican administration was a safe bet for 4 more years. A stark example of this is that in 1920 virtually no households owned a radio and by the end of the republican era of Harding, Coolidge, and Hoover more than 60% did.

The Nativism movement reached its highest influence during the campaign of 1924. The issue caused the most divided Democratic convention in history and divided the party into two main factions, the Nativist faction being led by William McAdoo. Contrast the democratic party's implosion with the Immigration Act of 1924 going into law just months before, Coolidge represented Americanism in the eyes of voters.

== Results ==
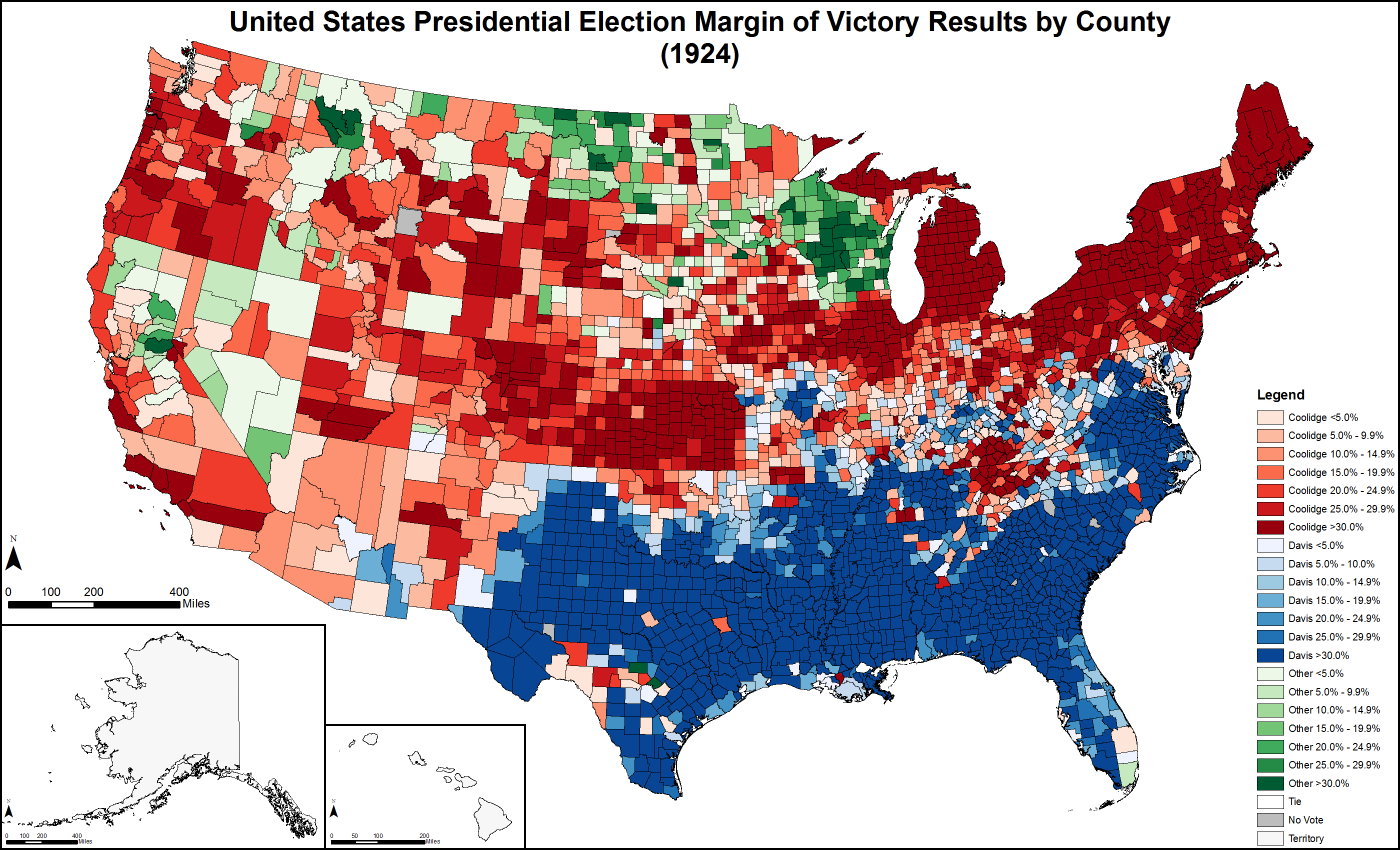
Results by county explicitly indicating the margin of victory for the winning candidate. Shades of red are for Coolidge (Republican), shades of blue are for Davis (Democratic), shades of green are for "Other(s)" (Non-Democratic/Non-Republican), grey indicates zero recorded votes and white indicates territories not elevated to statehood.

Victory Speech Coolidge — 1924 Election

Portrait of President Calvin Coolidge by Ercole Cartotto.

"I can only express my simple thanks to all those who have contributed to this result and plainly acknowledge that it has been brought to pass through the work of a Divine Providence, of which I am but one instrument. Such powers as I have I dedicate to the service of all my country and of all my countrymen."
— Calvin Coolidge, November 5, 1924

This was the first presidential election in which all American Indians were recognized as citizens and allowed to vote. The total vote increased by 2,300,000 but, because of the great drawing power of the La Follette candidacy, both the Republican and Democratic totals were less. Largely because of the deep inroads made by La Follette in the Democratic vote, Davis polled 750,000 fewer votes than were cast for Cox in 1920. Coolidge polled 425,000 votes less than Harding had in 1920. Nonetheless, La Follette's appeal among liberal Democrats allowed Coolidge to achieve a 25.2 percent margin of victory over Davis in the popular vote (the second largest since 1824, and the largest in the last century). Davis's popular vote percentage of 28.8% remains the lowest of any Democratic presidential candidate (not counting John C. Breckinridge's run on a Southern Democratic ticket in 1860, when the vote was split with Stephen A. Douglas, the main Democratic candidate), albeit with several other candidates performing worse in the electoral college.

Both La Follette and Davis had criticized the Ku Klux Klan during the campaign, but Coolidge did not speak on the issue despite pleas from black groups. The New York Times stated that "Either Mr. Coolidge holds his peace for mistaken reasons of policy and politics or he tolerates the Klan". Charles G. Dawes criticized the KKK on August 23, but his comments were criticized by Representative Fiorello La Guardia who stated that "General Dawes praised the Klan with faint damn".

The "other" vote amounted to nearly five million, owing in largest part to the 4,832,614 votes cast for La Follette. This candidacy, like that of Roosevelt in 1912, altered the distribution of the vote throughout the country and particularly in eighteen states in the Middle and Far West. Unlike the Roosevelt vote of 1912, the La Follette vote included most of the Socialist strength.

The La Follette vote was distributed over the nation, and in every state, but its greatest strength lay in the East North Central and West North Central sections. However, La Follette carried no section, and he was second in only two sections, the Mountain and Pacific areas. In twelve states, the La Follette vote was greater than that cast for Davis. In one of these states, Wisconsin, La Follette defeated the Republican ticket also, thus winning one state in the electoral college. The "other" vote led the poll in 235 counties, and practically all of these (225) gave La Follette a plurality. Four counties, three in the South, recorded zero votes, as against seven in 1920 – this decrease reflecting the Indian Citizenship Act.

With most of the third-party vote united under La Follette's candidacy, the Prohibition Party dropped to less than a third of the popular vote percentage that it had earned four years prior. This was the end of the Prohibitionists as a significant political force; having regularly earned at least a percentage point of the popular vote since 1884, they would struggle to earn even a tenth of that number in the decades ahead as Prohibition became increasingly unpopular and was eventually repealed in 1933, though the party nominally continues to exist and contest presidential elections to this day.

Davis won in 1,279 counties, which was 183 more than what Cox had received, and Coolidge failed to win in 377 counties that Harding had won in 1920. Coolidge's net vote totals in the twelve largest cities were less than Harding's with Coolidge only receiving 1,308,000 compared to Harding's 1,540,000. The inroads of the La Follette candidacy upon the Democratic Party were in areas where Democratic county majorities had been infrequent in the Fourth Party System. At the same time, the inroads of La Follette's candidacy upon the Republican Party were in areas where in this national contest their candidate could afford to be second or third in the poll. Thus, Davis carried only the traditionally Democratic Solid South (except Kentucky), and Oklahoma; due to liberal Democrats voting for La Follette, Davis lost the popular vote to Coolidge by 25.2 percentage points. Only Warren Harding, who finished 26.2 points ahead of his nearest competitor in the previous election, did better in this category in competition between multiple candidates (incumbent James Monroe was the only candidate in 1820 and thus took every vote).

This was one of only three elections with more than two major candidates where any candidate received a majority of popular votes cast, the others being 1832 and 1980. The combined vote for Davis and La Follette over the nation was exceeded by Coolidge by 2,500,000. Nevertheless, in thirteen states (four border and nine western), Coolidge received only a plurality. The Coolidge vote topped the poll, however, in thirty-five states, leaving the electoral vote for Davis in only twelve.

All the states of the former Confederacy voted for Davis (plus Oklahoma), while all of the Union/postbellum states (except Wisconsin and Oklahoma) voted for Coolidge. This remains the last time anyone won the presidency without carrying a single former Confederate state. This was the last presidential election until 2008 that West Virginia voted Republican while Virginia voted Democratic.

This was the last election in which Republicans won Massachusetts and Rhode Island until 1952. Davis did not carry any counties in twenty of the forty-eight states, two fewer than Cox during the previous election, but nonetheless, an ignominy approached since only by George McGovern in his landslide 1972 loss. Davis did not carry one county in any state bordering the Pacific or sharing a land border with Canada. The election was the last time a Republican won the presidency without Florida, Oklahoma, and Tennessee. It was the first time ever that a Republican won without Wisconsin. The eleven states of the former Confederacy provided 4.43% of Coolidge's votes, with him taking 27.94% of the vote in that region while La Follette took 4.80%.

This election was the last time the Democratic nominee for vice president was a sitting governor, and that Virginia voted for a Democratic nominee who lost the popular vote, until 2024. This was also the last election that neither major party nominee was from New York until 1956.

Electoral results
Presidential candidate	Party	Home state	Popular vote		Electoral vote	Running mate		
Presidential candidate	Party	Home state	Count	Percentage	Electoral vote	Vice-presidential candidate	Home state	Electoral vote
Calvin Coolidge (incumbent)	Republican	Massachusetts	15,723,789	54.04%	382	Charles G. Dawes	Illinois	382
John W. Davis	Democratic	West Virginia	8,386,242	28.82%	136	Charles W. Bryan	Nebraska	136
Robert M. La Follette	Progressive-Socialist-Farmer–Labor	Wisconsin	4,831,706	16.61%	13	Burton K. Wheeler	Montana	13
Herman P. Faris	Prohibition	Missouri	55,951	0.19%	0	Marie C. Brehm	California	0
William Z. Foster	Communist	Massachusetts	38,669	0.13%	0	Benjamin Gitlow	New York	0
Frank T. Johns	Socialist Labor	Oregon	28,633	0.10%	0	Verne L. Reynolds	New York	0
Gilbert Nations	American	District of Columbia	24,325	0.08%	0	Charles Hiram Randall	California	0
Other			7,792	0.03%	—	Other		—
Total			29,097,107	100%	531			531
Needed to win					266			266

Source (Popular Vote): Leip, David. "1924 Presidential Election Results". Dave Leip's Atlas of U.S. Presidential Elections.

Source (Electoral Vote): "Electoral College Box Scores 1789–1996". National Archives and Records Administration.

Popular vote
Coolidge	54.04%
Davis	28.82%
La Follette	16.61%
Others	0.53%

Electoral vote
Coolidge	71.94%
Davis	25.61%
La Follette	2.45%

=== Geography of results ===
Results by county, shaded according to winning candidate's percentage of the vote

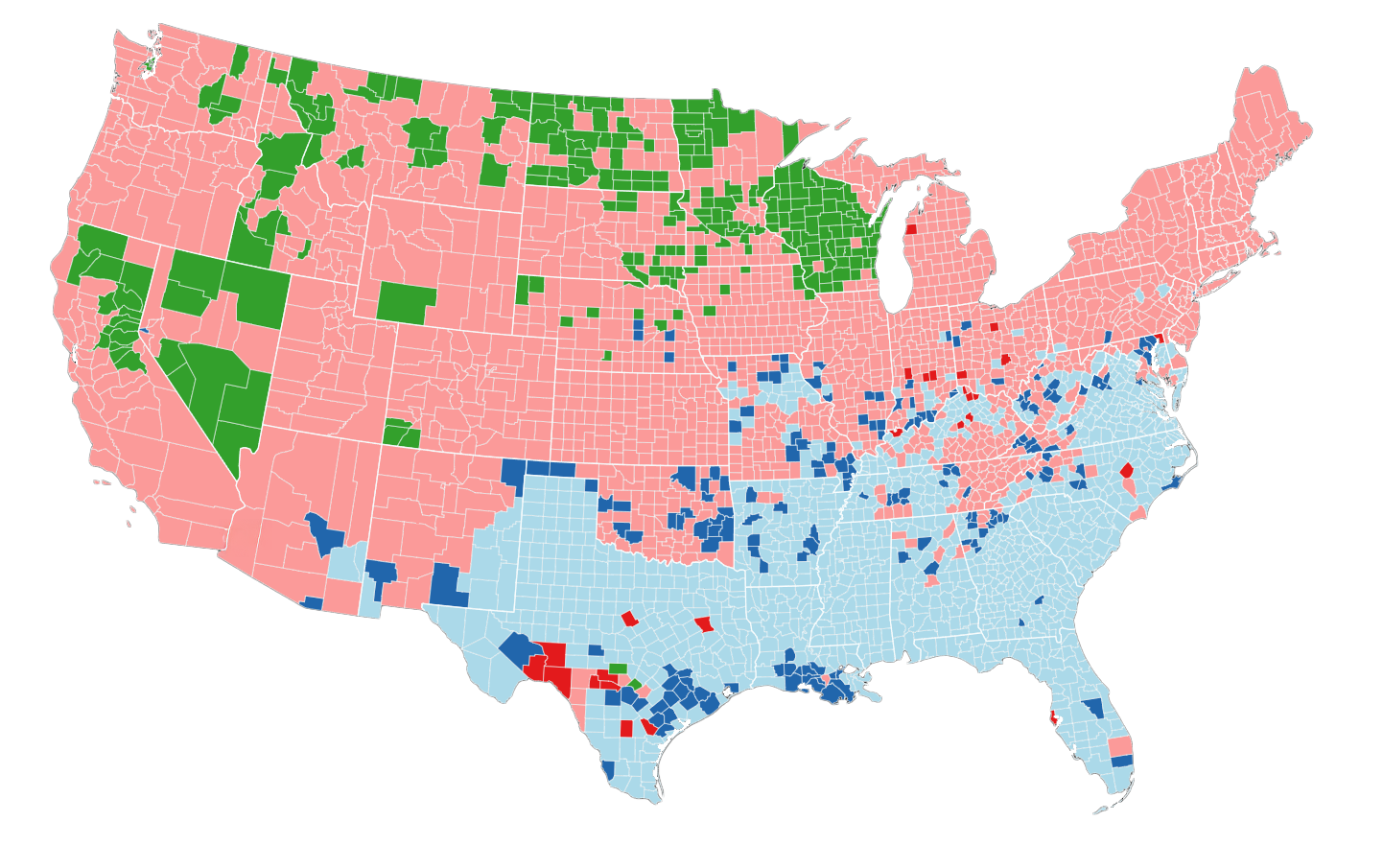
1920-24 county flips, with dark colors representing flips for each party.

==== Cartographic gallery ====
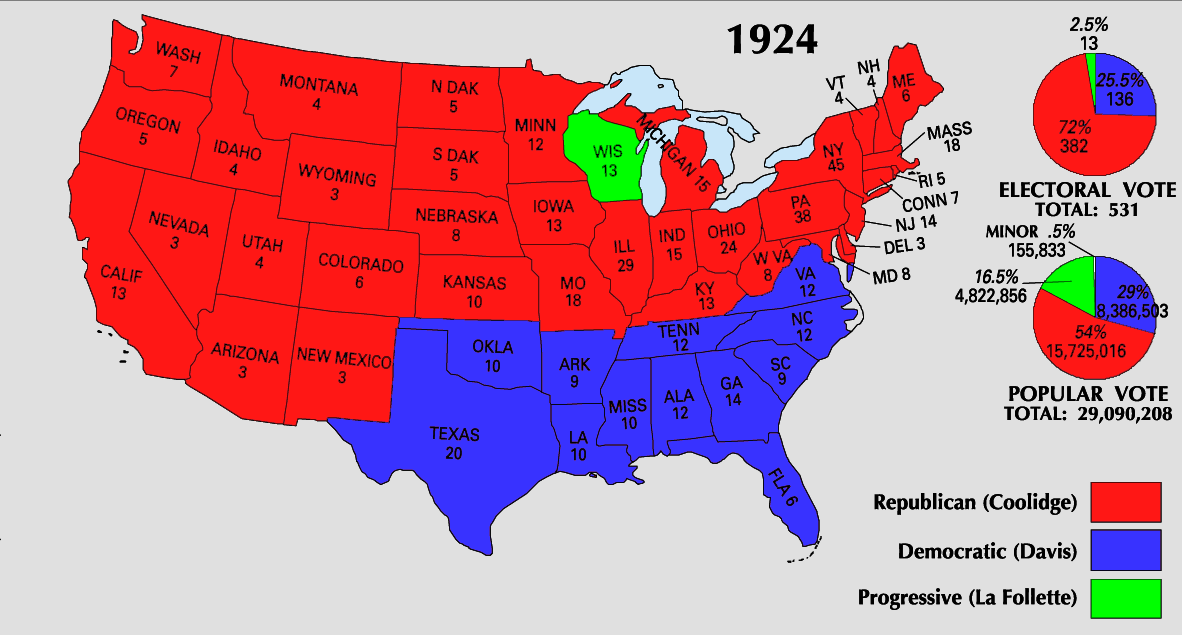

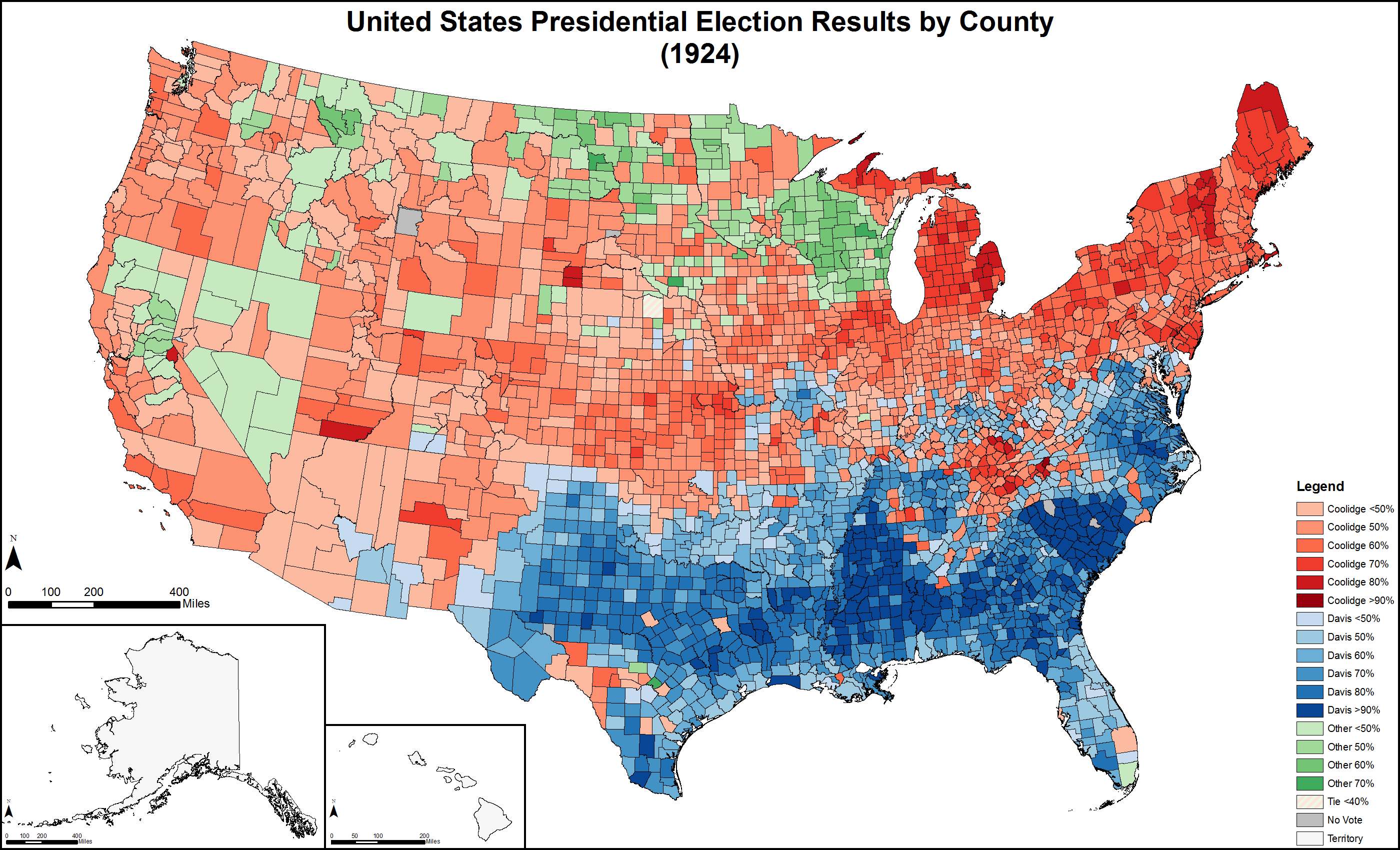
Map of presidential election results by county

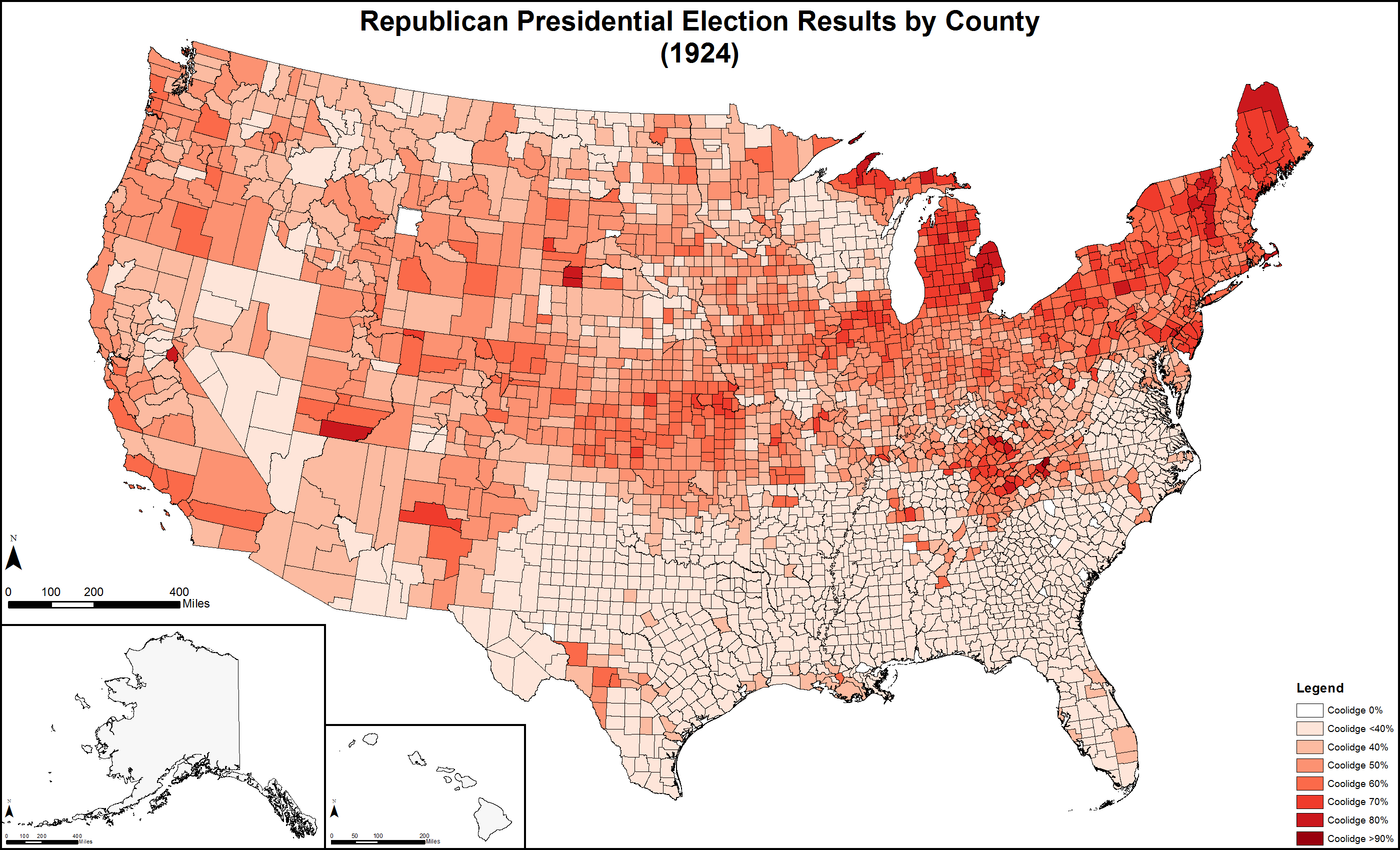
Map of Republican presidential election results by county

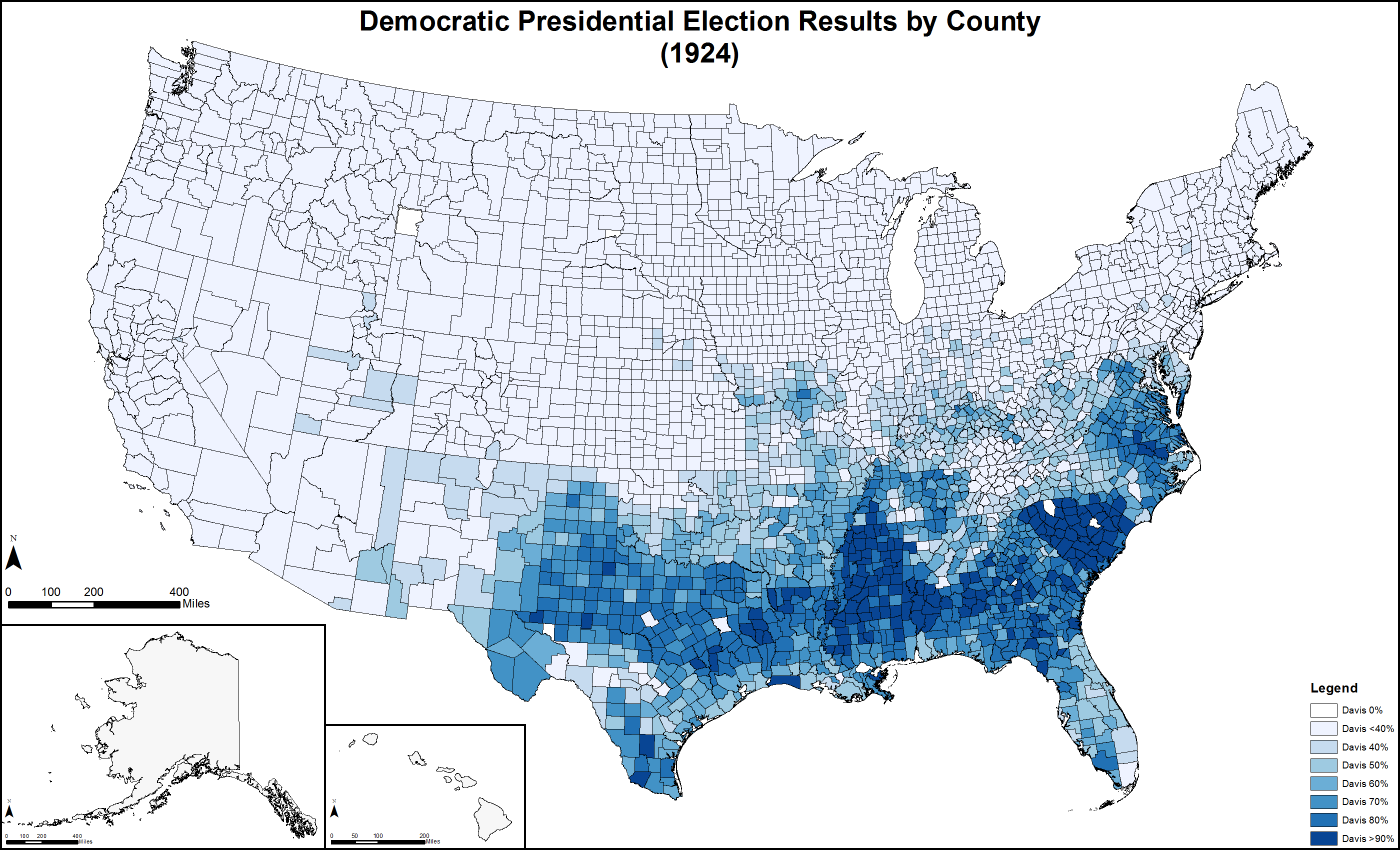
Map of Democratic presidential election results by county

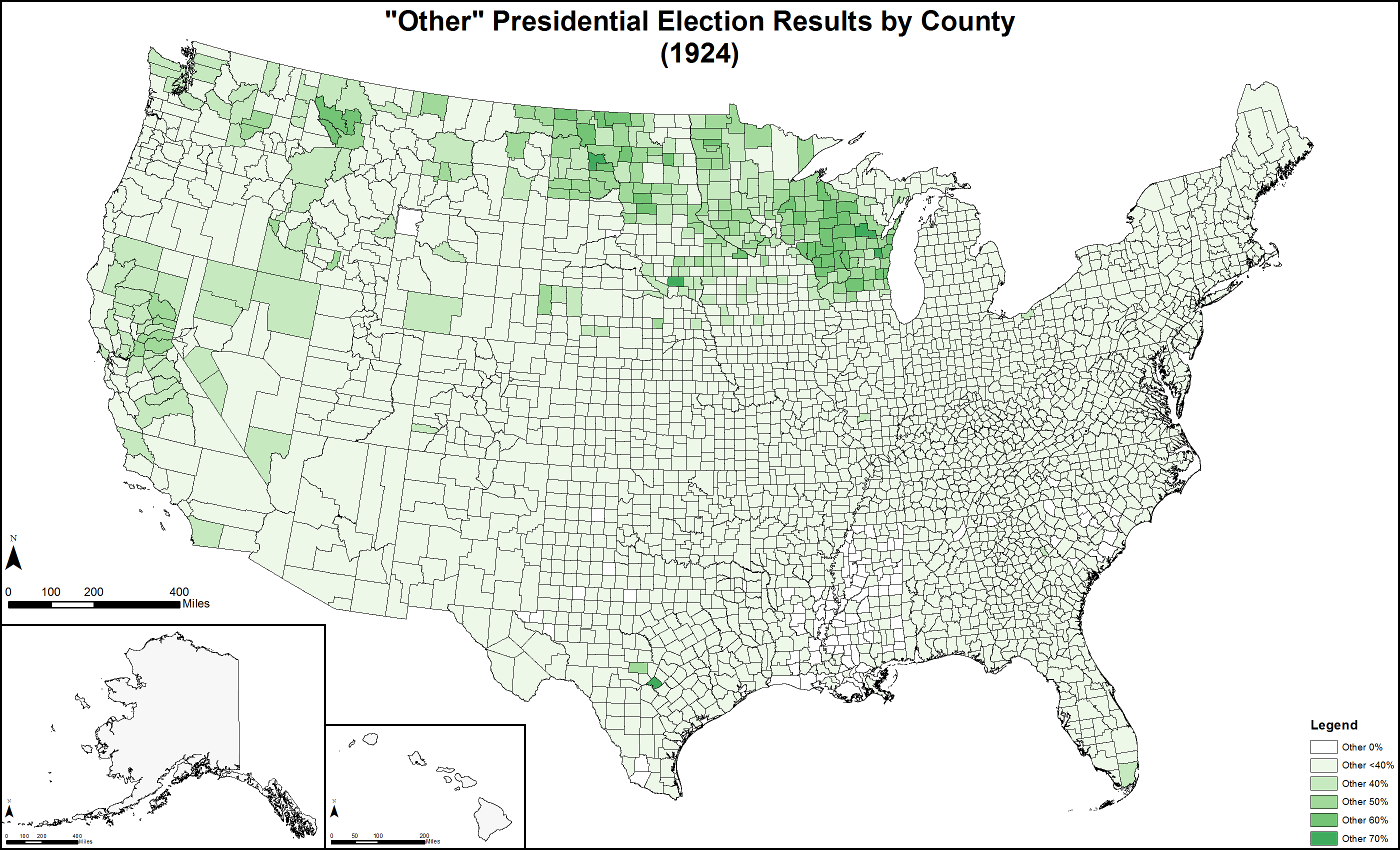
Map of "other" presidential election results by county

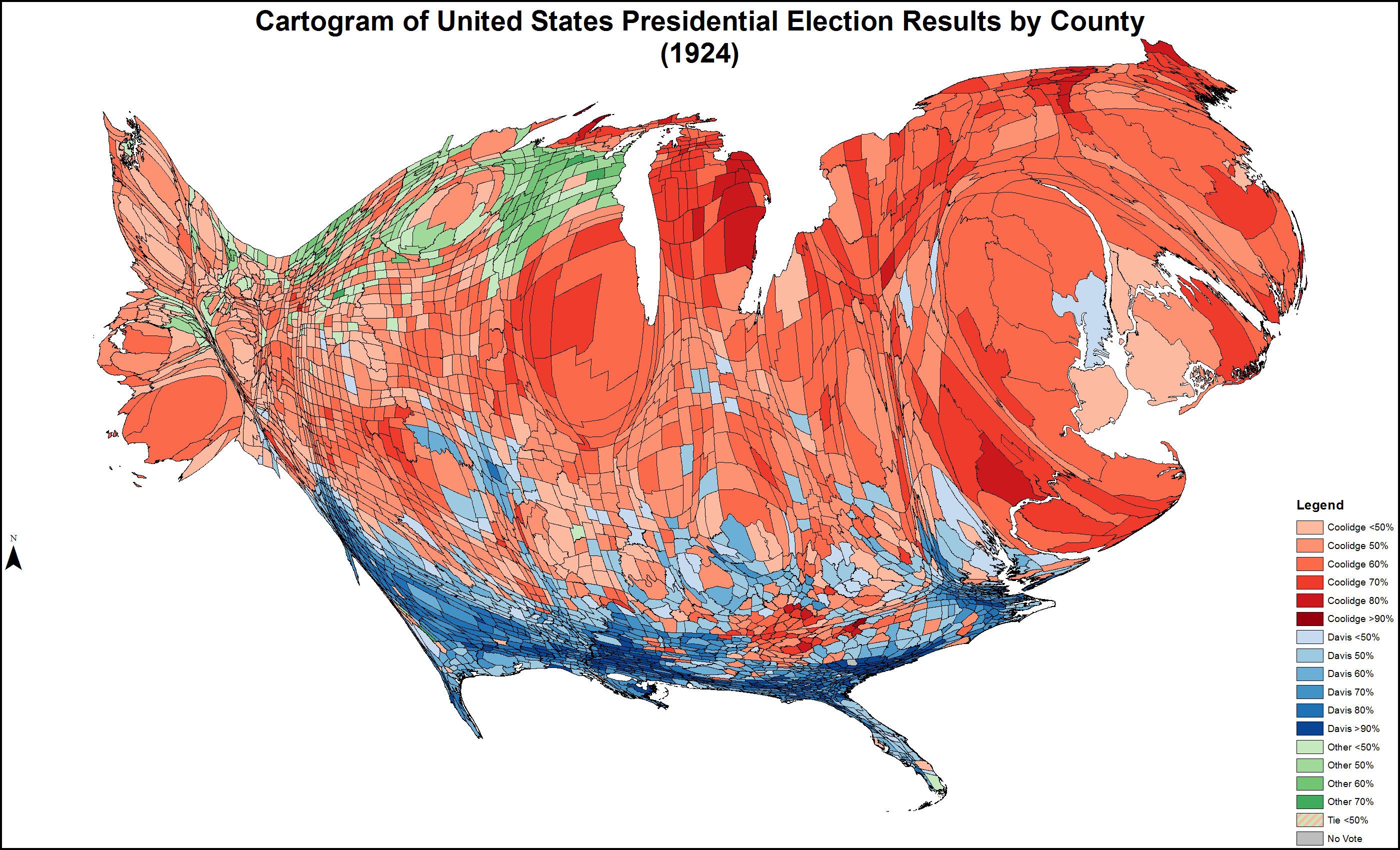
Cartogram of presidential election results by county

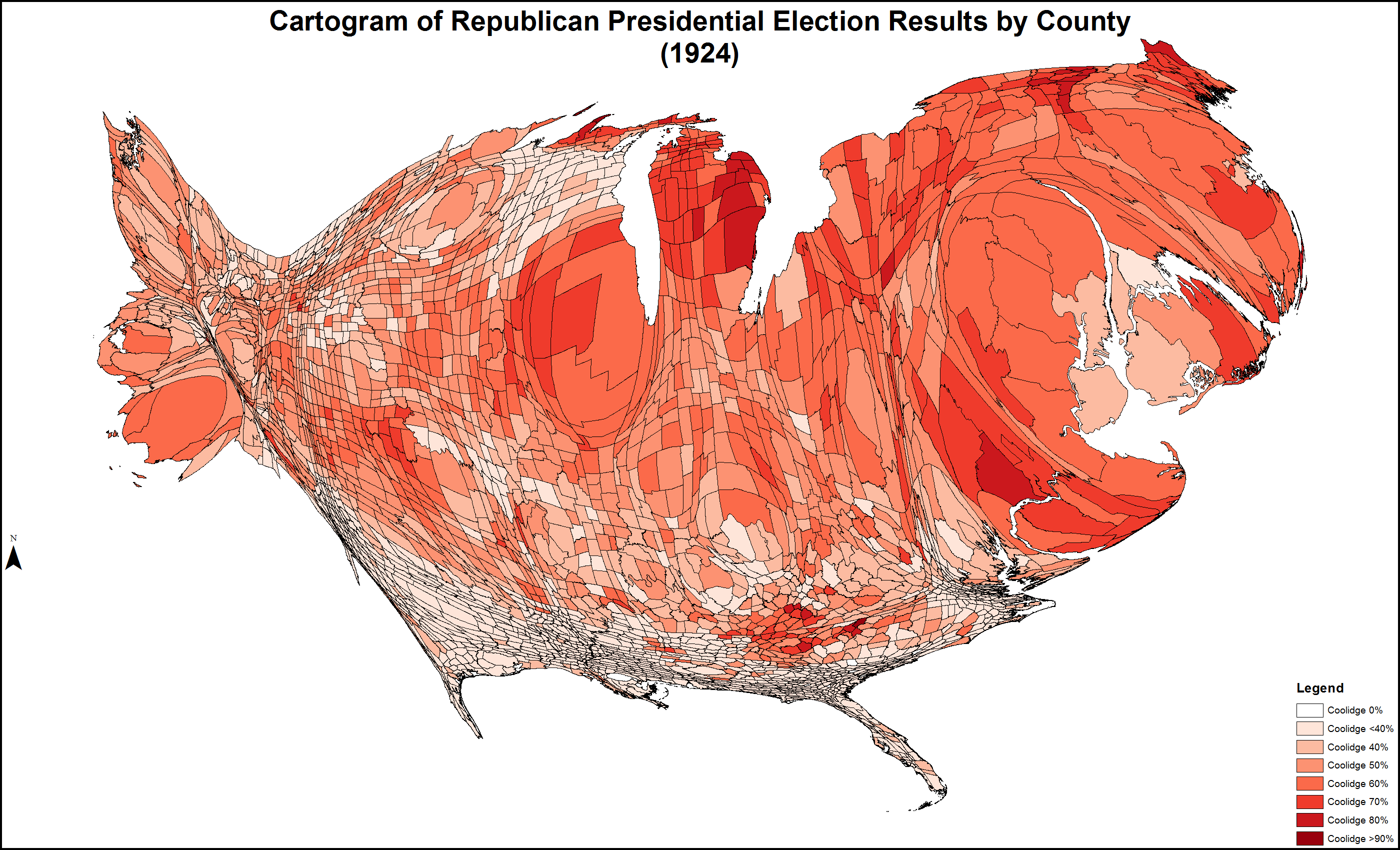
Cartogram of Republican presidential election results by county

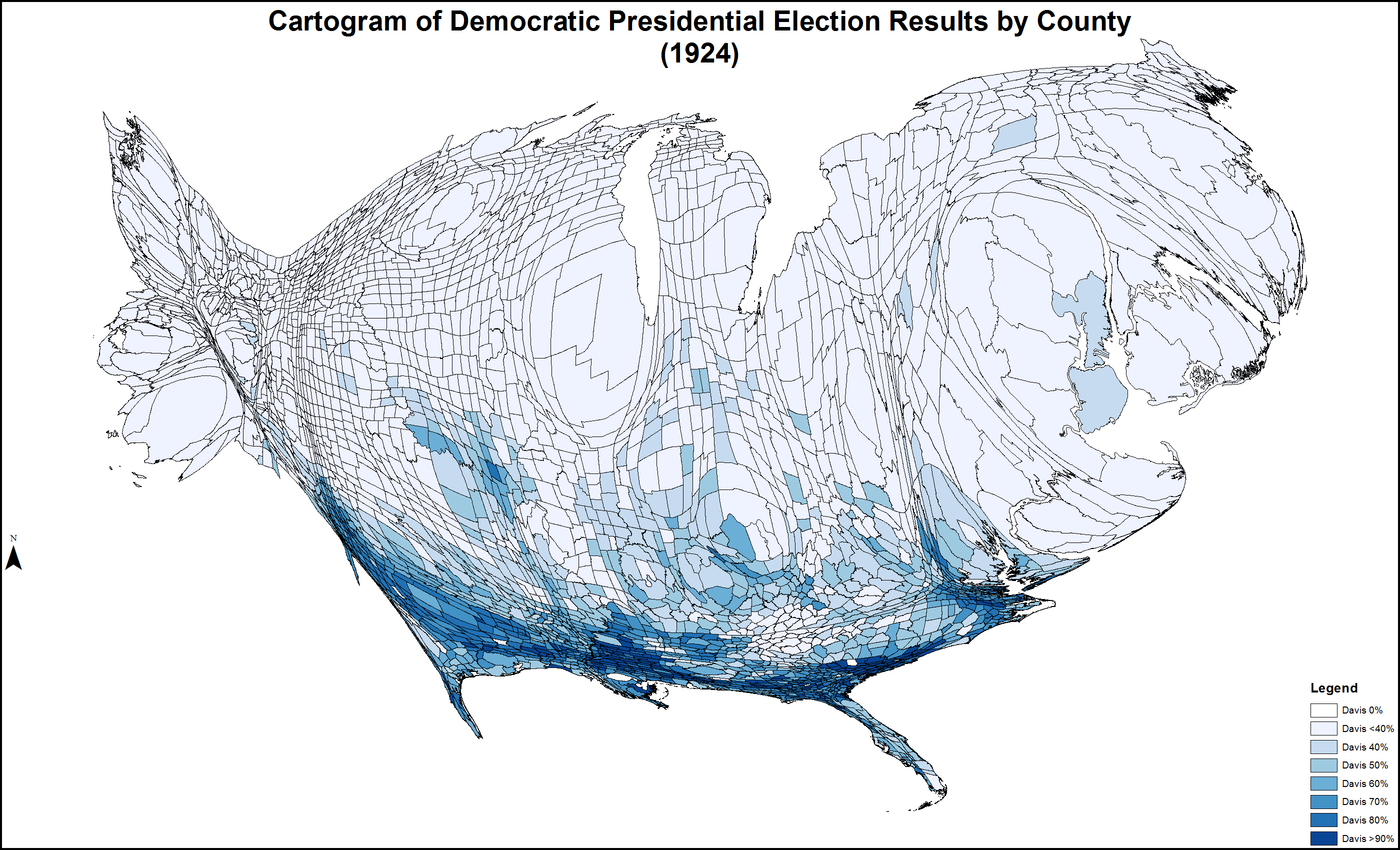
Cartogram of Democratic presidential election results by county

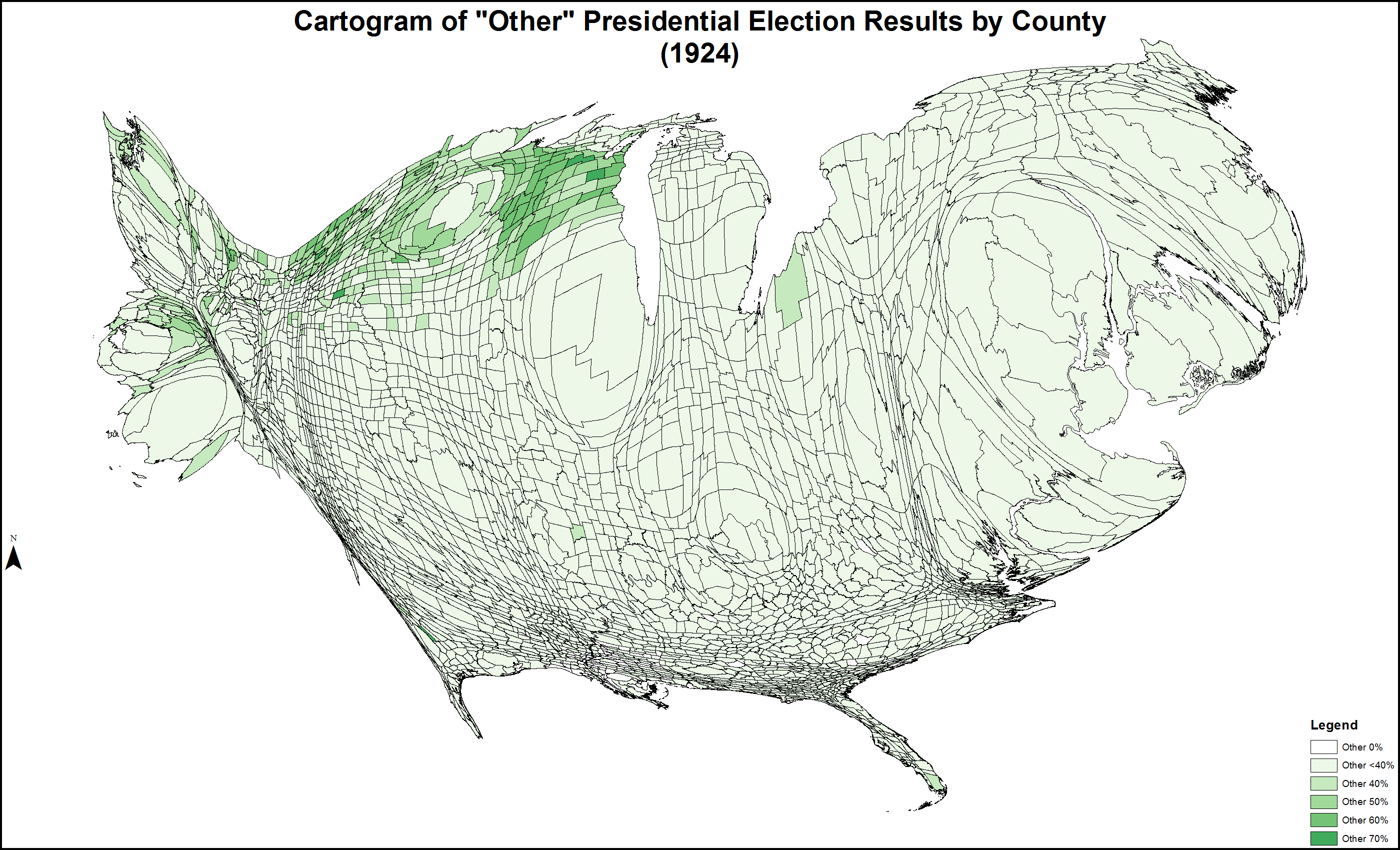
Cartogram of "other" presidential election results by county

Progressive Party performance by state

=== Results by state ===
States/districts won by Davis/Bryan
States/districts won by La Follette/Wheeler
States/districts won by Coolidge/Dawes

		Calvin Coolidge Republican			John W. Davis Democratic			Robert La Follette Progressive			Herman Faris Prohibition			William Foster Communist			Frank Johns Socialist Labor			Margin		State Total	
State	electoral votes	#	%	electoral votes	#	%	electoral votes	#	%	electoral votes	#	%	electoral votes	#	%	electoral votes	#	%	electoral votes	#	%	#	
Alabama	12	45,005	27.01	-	112,966	67.81	12	8,084	4.85	-	538	0.32	-	-	-	-	-	-	-	-67,961	-40.79	166,593	AL
Arizona	3	30,516	41.26	3	26,235	35.47	-	17,210	23.27	-	-	-	-	-	-	-	-	-	-	4,281	5.79	73,961	AZ
Arkansas	9	40,564	29.28	-	84,795	61.21	9	13,173	9.51	-	-	-	-	-	-	-	-	-	-	-44,231	-31.93	138,532	AR
California	13	733,250	57.20	13	105,514	8.23	-	424,649	33.13	-	18,365	1.43	-	-	-	-	-	-	-	308,601	24.07	1,281,900	CA
Colorado	6	195,171	57.02	6	75,238	21.98	-	69,945	20.44	-	966	0.28	-	562	0.16	-	378	0.11	-	119,933	35.04	342,260	CO
Connecticut	7	246,322	61.54	7	110,184	27.53	-	42,416	10.60	-	-	-	-	-	-	-	1,373	0.34	-	136,138	34.01	400,295	CT
Delaware	3	52,441	57.70	3	33,445	36.80	-	4,979	5.48	-	-	-	-	-	-	-	-	-	-	18,996	20.90	90,885	DE
Florida	6	30,633	28.06	-	62,083	56.88	6	8,625	7.90	-	5,498	5.04	-	-	-	-	-	-	-	-31,450	-28.81	109,154	FL
Georgia	14	30,300	18.19	-	123,200	73.96	14	12,691	7.62	-	231	0.14	-	-	-	-	-	-	-	-92,900	-55.77	166,577	GA
Idaho	4	69,879	47.12	4	24,256	16.36	-	54,160	36.52	-	-	-	-	-	-	-	-	-	-	15,719	10.60	148,295	ID
Illinois	29	1,453,321	58.84	29	576,975	23.36	-	432,027	17.49	-	2,367	0.10	-	2,622	0.11	-	2,334	0.09	-	876,346	35.48	2,470,067	IL
Indiana	15	703,042	55.25	15	492,245	38.69	-	71,700	5.64	-	4,416	0.35	-	987	0.08	-	-	-	-	210,797	16.57	1,272,390	IN
Iowa	13	537,635	55.03	13	162,600	16.64	-	272,243	27.87	-	-	-	-	4,037	0.41	-	-	-	-	265,392	27.17	976,960	IA
Kansas	10	407,671	61.54	10	156,319	23.60	-	98,461	14.86	-	-	-	-	-	-	-	-	-	-	251,352	37.94	662,454	KS
Kentucky	13	398,966	48.93	13	374,855	45.98	-	38,465	4.72	-	-	-	-	-	-	-	1,499	0.18	-	24,111	2.96	815,332	KY
Louisiana	10	24,670	20.23	-	93,218	76.44	10	-	-	-	-	-	-	-	-	-	-	-	-	-68,548	-56.21	121,951	LA
Maine	6	138,440	72.03	6	41,964	21.83	-	11,382	5.92	-	-	-	-	-	-	-	406	0.21	-	96,476	50.20	192,192	ME
Maryland	8	162,414	45.29	8	148,072	41.29	-	47,157	13.15	-	-	-	-	-	-	-	987	0.28	-	14,342	4.00	358,630	MD
Massachusetts	18	703,476	62.26	18	280,831	24.86	-	141,225	12.50	-	-	-	-	2,635	0.23	-	1,668	0.15	-	422,645	37.41	1,129,837	MA
Michigan	15	874,631	75.37	15	152,359	13.13	-	122,014	10.51	-	6,085	0.52	-	5,330	0.46	-	-	-	-	722,272	62.24	1,160,419	MI
Minnesota	12	420,759	51.18	12	55,913	6.80	-	339,192	41.26	-	-	-	-	4,427	0.54	-	1,855	0.23	-	81,567	9.92	822,146	MN
Mississippi	10	8,494	7.55	-	100,474	89.34	10	3,494	3.11	-	-	-	-	-	-	-	-	-	-	-91,980	-81.79	112,462	MS
Missouri	18	648,486	49.58	18	572,753	43.79	-	84,160	6.43	-	1,418	0.11	-	-	-	-	883	0.07	-	75,733	5.79	1,307,958	MO
Montana	4	74,138	42.50	4	33,805	19.38	-	66,123	37.91	-	-	-	-	357	0.20	-	-	-	-	8,015	4.60	174,423	MT
Nebraska	8	218,585	47.09	8	137,289	29.58	-	106,701	22.99	-	1,594	0.34	-	-	-	-	-	-	-	81,296	17.51	464,173	NE
Nevada	3	11,243	41.76	3	5,909	21.95	-	9,769	36.29	-	-	-	-	-	-	-	-	-	-	1,474	5.48	26,921	NV
New Hampshire	4	98,575	59.83	4	57,201	34.72	-	8,993	5.46	-	-	-	-	-	-	-	-	-	-	41,374	25.11	164,769	NH
New Jersey	14	675,162	62.17	14	297,743	27.41	-	108,901	10.03	-	1,337	0.12	-	1,540	0.14	-	819	0.08	-	377,419	34.75	1,086,079	NJ
New Mexico	3	54,745	48.52	3	48,542	43.02	-	9,543	8.46	-	-	-	-	-	-	-	-	-	-	6,203	5.50	112,830	NM
New York	45	1,820,058	55.76	45	950,796	29.13	-	474,913	14.55	-	-	-	-	8,244	0.25	-	9,928	0.30	-	869,262	26.63	3,263,939	NY
North Carolina	12	191,753	39.73	-	284,270	58.89	12	6,651	1.38	-	13	0.00	-	-	-	-	-	-	-	-92,517	-19.17	482,687	NC
North Dakota	5	94,931	47.68	5	13,858	6.96	-	89,922	45.17	-	-	-	-	370	0.19	-	-	-	-	5,009	2.52	199,081	ND
Ohio	24	1,176,130	58.33	24	477,888	23.70	-	357,948	17.75	-	-	-	-	-	-	-	3,025	0.15	-	698,242	34.63	2,016,237	OH
Oklahoma	10	226,242	42.82	-	255,798	48.41	10	46,375	8.78	-	-	-	-	-	-	-	-	-	-	-29,556	-5.59	528,415	OK
Oregon	5	142,579	51.01	5	67,589	24.18	-	68,403	24.47	-	-	-	-	-	-	-	917	0.33	-	74,176	26.54	279,488	OR
Pennsylvania	38	1,401,481	65.34	38	409,192	19.08	-	307,567	14.34	-	9,779	0.46	-	2,735	0.13	-	634	0.03	-	992,289	46.26	2,144,850	PA
Rhode Island	5	125,286	59.63	5	76,606	36.46	-	7,628	3.63	-	-	-	-	289	0.14	-	268	0.13	-	48,680	23.17	210,115	RI
South Carolina	9	1,123	2.21	-	49,008	96.56	9	620	1.22	-	-	-	-	-	-	-	-	-	-	-47,885	-94.35	50,752	SC
South Dakota	5	101,299	49.69	5	27,214	13.35	-	75,355	36.96	-	-	-	-	-	-	-	-	-	-	25,944	12.73	203,868	SD
Tennessee	12	130,882	43.59	-	158,537	52.80	12	10,656	3.55	-	100	0.03	-	-	-	-	-	-	-	-27,655	-9.21	300,275	TN
Texas	20	130,023	19.78	-	484,605	73.70	20	42,881	6.52	-	-	-	-	-	-	-	-	-	-	-354,582	-53.93	657,509	TX
Utah	4	77,327	49.26	4	47,001	29.94	-	32,662	20.81	-	-	-	-	-	-	-	-	-	-	30,326	19.32	156,990	UT
Vermont	4	80,498	78.22	4	16,124	15.67	-	5,964	5.79	-	326	0.32	-	-	-	-	-	-	-	64,374	62.55	102,917	VT
Virginia	12	73,312	32.79	-	139,716	62.48	12	10,377	4.64	-	-	-	-	-	-	-	197	0.09	-	-66,404	-29.70	223,602	VA
Washington	7	220,224	52.24	7	42,842	10.16	-	150,727	35.76	-	-	-	-	761	0.18	-	1,004	0.24	-	69,497	16.49	421,549	WA
West Virginia	8	288,635	49.45	8	257,232	44.07	-	36,723	6.29	-	-	-	-	-	-	-	-	-	-	31,403	5.38	583,662	WV
Wisconsin	13	311,614	37.06	-	68,115	8.10	-	453,678	53.96	13	2,918	0.35	-	3,773	0.45	-	458	0.05	-	-142,064	-16.90	840,826	WI
Wyoming	3	41,858	52.39	3	12,868	16.11	-	25,174	31.51	-	-	-	-	-	-	-	-	-	-	16,684	20.88	79,900	WY
TOTALS:	531	15,723,789	54.04	382	8,386,242	28.82	136	4,831,706	16.61	13	55,951	0.19	-	38,669	0.13	-	28,633	0.10	-	7,337,547	25.22	29,097,107	US

==== States that flipped from Republican to Democratic ====
- Oklahoma
- Tennessee

==== States that flipped from Democratic to Republican ====
- Kentucky

==== States that flipped from Republican to Progressive ====
- Wisconsin

==== Close states ====
Margin of victory less than 5% (30 electoral votes):

1. North Dakota, 2.52% (5,009 votes)
2. Kentucky, 2.96% (24,111 votes)
3. Maryland, 4.00% (14,342 votes)
4. Montana, 4.60% (8,015 votes)

Margin of victory between 5% and 10% (69 electoral votes):

1. West Virginia, 5.38% (31,403 votes)
2. Nevada, 5.48% (1,474 votes)
3. New Mexico, 5.50% (6,203 votes)
4. Oklahoma, 5.59% (29,556 votes)
5. Arizona, 5.79% (4,281 votes)
6. Missouri, 5.79% (75,733 votes)
7. Tennessee, 9.21% (27,655 votes)
8. Minnesota, 9.92% (81,567 votes)

Tipping point state:

1. Nebraska, 17.51% (81,296 votes) (tipping point state for a Coolidge victory)
2. New York, 26.63% (869,262 votes) (tipping point state for a Davis victory)
3. Pennsylvania, 51.00% (1,093,914 votes) (tipping point state for a La Follette victory)

==== Statistics ====
Counties with Highest Percent of Vote (Republican)

1. Johnson County, Tennessee 91.32%
2. Keweenaw County, Michigan 91.15%
3. Shannon County, South Dakota 88.89%
4. Leslie County, Kentucky 88.83%
5. Windsor County, Vermont 88.43%

Counties with Highest Percent of Vote (Democratic)

1. Edgefield County, South Carolina 100.00%
2. Marlboro County, South Carolina 100.00%
3. Kershaw County, South Carolina 99.86%
4. Horry County, South Carolina 99.70%
5. Marion County, South Carolina 99.68%

Counties with Highest Percent of Vote (Progressive)

1. Comal County, Texas 73.96%
2. Mercer County, North Dakota 71.38%
3. Shawano County, Wisconsin 70.69%
4. Hutchinson County, South Dakota 70.38%
5. Calumet County, Wisconsin 69.42%

== See also ==
- 1924 Farmer-Labor National Convention
- 1924 Prohibition National Convention
- 1924 Workers National Convention
- History of the United States (1918–1945)
- Progressive Era
- 1924 United States Senate elections
- 1924 United States House of Representatives elections
- Second inauguration of Calvin Coolidge

== Works cited ==
- Sherman, Richard (1973). The Republican Party and Black America From McKinley to Hoover 1896-1933. University of Virginia Press. ISBN 0813904676.
