= D. Leigh Colvin =

American politician

David Leigh Colvin
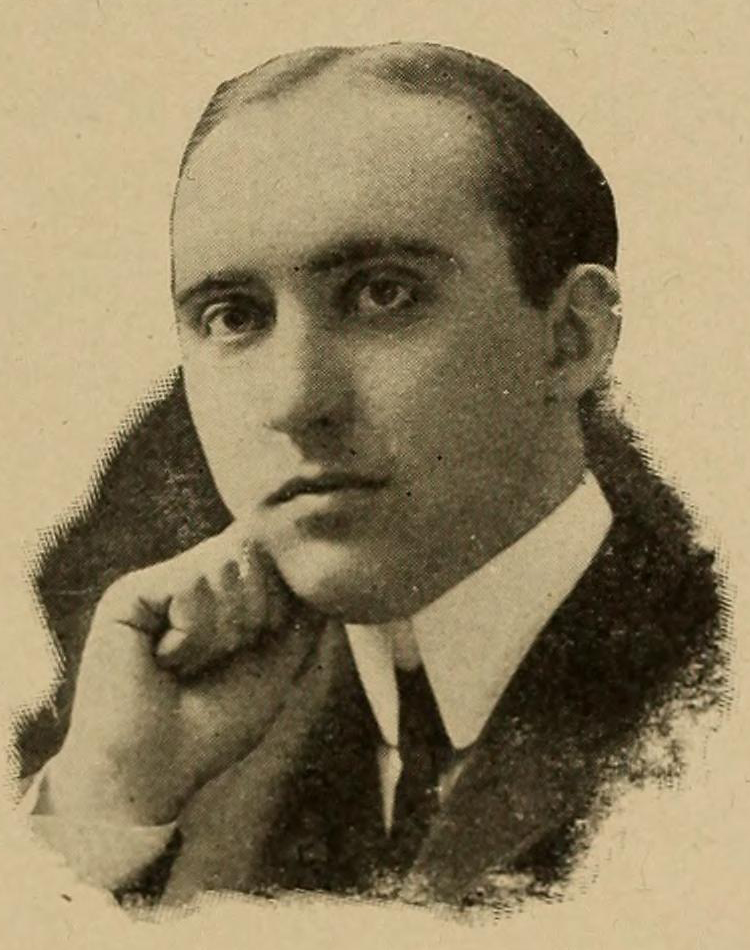
- Born: January 28, 1880; Charleston, South Carolina
- Died: September 7, 1959 (aged 79)
- Citizenship: American
- Occupation: Politician
- Political party: Prohibition Party

David Leigh Colvin (January 28, 1880, in Charleston, South Carolina – September 7, 1959) was an American politician and member of the Prohibition Party and the Law Preservation Party.

He spent most of his life in New York, where he was a historian and a temperance society executive. He attended the American Temperance University and Ohio Wesleyan University before going on to study law at the University of California, Berkeley, University of Chicago and Columbia University.

He ran for U.S. Senator from New York in 1916 and 1932, for Mayor of New York City in 1917, for Vice President of the United States in 1920, for U.S. Representative from New York in 1922, and for President of the United States in 1936. Colvin was Chairman of the Prohibition National Committee from 1926 to 1932.

== See also ==
- Temperance organizations

Party political offices
Preceded by Ira Landrith	Prohibition Party vice presidential candidate 1920 (lost)	Succeeded by Marie C. Brehm
