= Herman P. Faris =

American businessman and politician

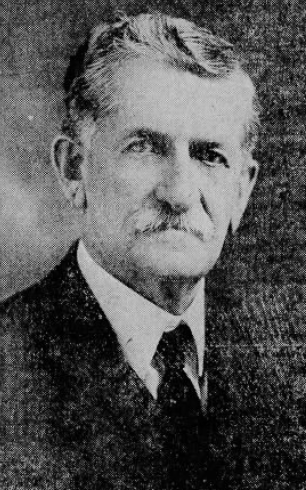

Personal details
- Born: Herman Preston Faris; December 25, 1858 Bellefontaine, Ohio, U.S.
- Died: March 20, 1936 (aged 77) Deepwater, Missouri, U.S.
- Party: Prohibition
- Other political affiliations: Republican (before 1884)
- Spouse(s): Adda Winters; Sallie A. Lewis
- Children: 5
- Parents: Samuel D. Faris (father); Sarah Plumber Finks (mother)

Herman Preston Faris (December 25, 1858 – March 20, 1936) was an American businessman and politician who served as treasurer of the Prohibition National Committee, twice as the Prohibition Party candidate for governor of Missouri, and was the party's presidential candidate during the 1924 presidential election.

== Life ==
Herman Preston Faris was born on December 25, 1858, in Bellefontaine, Ohio, to Samuel D. Faris and Sarah Plumber Finks. His family later moved to Lawrence, Kansas. He later moved to Clinton, Missouri in 1867, he would temporarily leave it for Colorado in the 1870s and returned, where he became a successful banker, but suffered financial difficulties shortly before his death. In 1889 he married Adda Winters and later had five children with her and in 1911 he married Sallie A. Lewis.

In 1884, he left the Republican Party and joined the Prohibition Party and afterwards he became active in electoral politics with his running for secretary of state, governor four times, and senator twice. During the 1920 presidential election he ran for the Prohibition Party's vice presidential nomination, but was defeated by D. Leigh Colvin with 108 delegates to 47 delegates. In 1924, he was given the Prohibition Party's presidential nomination with 82 delegates against A.P. Gouttey's 40 and used the slogan "Be Fair With Faris" and received 55,951 votes. During the 1928 presidential election he supported Herbert Hoover and campaigned for him in Texas due to Al Smith's anti-prohibition stances and had expected the Prohibition Party to give its nomination to Hoover rather than to William F. Varney.

On March 20, 1936, Faris suffered either a heart attack or a stroke before crashing his car off a bridge at age 77.

== Electoral history ==
Herman P. Faris electoral history

1888 Missouri Secretary of state election
Party	Candidate	Votes	%
Democratic	Alexander A. LeSueur	261,301	50.12%
Republican	F. W. Mott	236,855	45.43%
Labor	Boswell Fox	18,769	3.60%
Prohibition	Herman P. Faris	4,399	0.84%
Total votes		521,324	100.00%

1896 Missouri gubernatorial election
Party	Candidate	Votes	%	±%
Democratic	Lon Vest Stephens	351,062	52.88%	+3.90%
Republican	Robert E. Lewis	307,729	46.35%	+2.85%
Prohibition	Herman P. Faris	2,588	0.39%	−0.24%
National Democratic	J. McDowell Trimble	1,809	0.27%	+0.27%
Socialist Labor	Louis C. Fry	757	0.11%	+0.11%
Total votes		663,945	100.00%	

1908 Missouri gubernatorial election
Party	Candidate	Votes	%	±%
Republican	Herbert S. Hadley	355,932	49.73%	+3.68%
Democratic	William S. Cowherd	340,053	47.51%	−3.22%
Socialist	William L. Garver	14,505	2.03%	+0.32%
Prohibition	Herman P. Faris	4,169	0.58%	−0.29%
Populist	William A. Dillon	1,058	0.15%	−0.27%
Total votes		715,717	100.00%	

1912 Missouri Sixth Congressional District election
Party	Candidate	Votes	%	±%
Democratic	Clement C. Dickinson	17,858	52.24%	−0.99%
Republican	Louis T. Dunaway	9,093	26.60%	−17.11%
Progressive	G. A. Theilmann	6,788	19.86%	+19.86%
Prohibition	Herman P. Faris	448	1.31%	−0.17%
Total votes		34,187	100.00%	

1920 Missouri gubernatorial election
Party	Candidate	Votes	%	±%
Republican	Arthur M. Hyde	722,020	54.25%	+5.89%
Democratic	John M. Atkinson	580,726	43.64%	−5.01%
Socialist	Marvin M. Aldrich	19,489	1.46%	−0.39%
Prohibition	Herman P. Faris	3,974	0.30%	−0.21%
Farmer–Labor	Vaughn Hickman	3,003	0.23%	+0.23%
Socialist Labor	Edward G. Middlecoff	1,620	0.12%	N/A
Total votes		1,330,832	100.00%	

1926 Missouri Senate election
Party	Candidate	Votes	%	±%
Democratic	Harry B. Hawes	506,015	51.30%	−0.79%
Republican	George Henry Williams	470,654	47.71%	−0.20%
Prohibition	Herman P. Faris	7,540	0.76%	+0.76%
Socialist	Robert D. Morrison	1,807	0.18%	+0.18%
Socialist Labor	William Wesley Cox	464	0.05%	+0.05%
Total votes		986,480	100.00%	

1932 Missouri Senate election
Party	Candidate	Votes	%	±%
Democratic	Bennett Champ Clark	1,017,046	63.26%	+11.96%
Republican	Henry Kiel	575,174	35.78%	−11.93%
Socialist	Robert D. Morrison	11,441	0.71%	+0.53%
Prohibition	Herman P. Faris	3,147	0.20%	−0.56%
Communist	Julius Pollack	533	0.03%	+0.03%
Socialist Labor	Karl Oberheu	417	0.03%	−0.02%
Total votes		986,480	100.00%	

== See also ==
- Temperance organizations

Party political offices
Preceded by Aaron S. Watkins	Prohibition nominee for President of the United States; 1924	Succeeded by William F. Varney
