= 1924 United States presidential election in Georgia =

- November 4, 1924

Nominee	John W. Davis	Calvin Coolidge	Robert M. La Follette
Party	Democratic	Republican	Progressive
Home state	West Virginia	Massachusetts	Wisconsin
Running mate	Charles W. Bryan	Charles G. Dawes	Burton K. Wheeler
Electoral vote	14	0	0
Popular vote	123,200	30,300	12,691
Percentage	73.96%	18.19%	7.62%
County results
Davis
40–50%
50–60%
60–70%
70–80%
80–90%
90–100%
Coolidge
50–60%
60–70%
President before election
Calvin Coolidge
Republican
Elected President
Calvin Coolidge
Republican

The 1924 United States presidential election in Georgia took place on November 4, 1924, as part of the wider United States presidential election. Voters chose 14 representatives, or electors, to the Electoral College, who voted for president and vice president.

With the exception of a handful of historically Unionist North Georgia counties – chiefly Fannin but also to a lesser extent Pickens, Gilmer and Towns – Georgia since the 1880s had been a one-party state dominated by the Democratic Party. Disfranchisement of almost all African-Americans and most poor whites had made the Republican Party virtually nonexistent outside of local governments in those few hill counties, and the national Democratic Party served as the guardian of white supremacy against a Republican Party historically associated with memories of Reconstruction. The only competitive elections were Democratic primaries, which state laws restricted to whites on the grounds of the Democratic Party being legally a private club.

== Results ==
1924 United States presidential election in Georgia
Party	Candidate	Votes	Percentage	Electoral votes
Democratic	John W. Davis	123,200	73.96%	14
Republican	Calvin Coolidge (incumbent)	30,300	18.19%	0
Progressive	Robert M. La Follette	12,691	7.62%	0
Prohibition Party	Herman P. Faris	231 (Note: These write-in votes were not separated by county and only given as a statewide total.)	0.14%	0
American Party	Gilbert Owen Nations	155	0.09%	0

=== Results by congressional districts ===
State at-large
Candidate	Party	Votes	%
N. E. Harris	Democratic Party	123,200	37.06
John G. Valentino	Democratic Party	122,613	36.88
George Mogan	Republican Party	30,300	9.11
H. G. Hastings	Republican Party	30,241	9.10
C. W. McClure	Progressive Party	12,687	3.82
J. L. Sibley	Progressive Party	12,691	3.82
W. S. Witham, Sr.	Prohibition Party	231	0.07
Mrs. Standifer Stevenson	Prohibition Party	229	0.07
Thomas M. Poole	American Party	123	0.04
Starr C. Williams	American Party	122	0.04
Total		332,437	100.00

1st congressional district
Candidate	Party	Votes	%
Newton J. Norman	Democratic Party	122,715	74.10
A. S. Anderson	Republican Party	30,146	18.20
William Gray	Progressive Party	12,597	7.61
W. R. Altman	American Party	148	0.09
Total		165,606	100.00

2nd congressional district
Candidate	Party	Votes	%
C. M. Ledbetter	Democratic Party	122,718	74.18
Henry Bruton	Republican Party	30,134	18.21
J. G. Standifer	Progressive Party	12,589	7.61
Total		165,441	100.00

3rd congressional district
Candidate	Party	Votes	%
Mrs. Lon Dickey	Democratic Party	122,675	74.17
Charles Taunton	Republican Party	30,131	18.22
Marvin Rambo	Progressive Party	12,589	7.61
Total		165,395	100.00

4th congressional district
Candidate	Party	Votes	%
Buford Boykin	Democratic Party	122,717	74.11
Claude E. Smith	Republican Party	30,123	18.19
L. C. Clark	Progressive Party	12,589	7.60
Lorenzo H. Dixon	American Party	153	0.09
Total		165,582	100.00

5th congressional district
Candidate	Party	Votes	%
J. T. Duncan	Democratic Party	122,677	74.10
Joe Jacobs	Republican Party	30,129	18.20
Marvin Roane	Progressive Party	12,590	7.60
Carl F. Hutcheson	American Party	153	0.09
Total		165,549	100.00

6th congressional district
Candidate	Party	Votes	%
D. P. Melson	Democratic Party	122,664	74.10
Charles Akerman	Republican Party	30,126	18.20
J. D. Minor	Progressive Party	12,586	7.60
W. O. Coleman	American Party	154	0.09
Total		165,530	100.00

7th congressional district
Candidate	Party	Votes	%
C. M. Milam	Democratic Party	122,680	74.10
Charles Adamson	Republican Party	30,141	18.20
W. G. McRae	Progressive Party	12,592	7.61
Robert L. Benson	American Party	155	0.09
Total		165,568	100.00

8th congressional district
Candidate	Party	Votes	%
James C. Williams	Democratic Party	122,701	74.17
J. A. Duncan	Republican Party	30,136	18.22
W. W. Darden	Progressive Party	12,590	7.61
Total		165,427	100.00

9th congressional district
Candidate	Party	Votes	%
W. B. Rice	Democratic Party	122,758	74.18
W. A. Carlisle	Republican Party	30,132	18.21
W. J. Herrin	Progressive Party	12,588	7.61
Total		165,478	100.00

10th congressional district
Candidate	Party	Votes	%
Roy V. Harris	Democratic Party	122,745	74.16
J. P. Wood	Republican Party	30,134	18.21
J. C. Wall	Progressive Party	12,630	7.63
Total		165,509	100.00

11th congressional district
Candidate	Party	Votes	%
W. R. Wilson	Democratic Party	122,723	74.18
Samuel Purvis	Republican Party	30,134	18.21
Dan Cowart	Progressive Party	12,592	7.61
Total		165,449	100.00

12th congressional district
Candidate	Party	Votes	%
Guy O. Stone	Democratic Party	122,754	74.19
W. L. Harris	Republican Party	30,119	18.20
H. W. Nalley	Progressive Party	12,596	7.61
Total		165,469	100.00

=== Results by county ===
County	John William Davis Democratic		John Calvin Coolidge Republican		Robert Marion La Follette Sr. Progressive		Margin		Total votes cast
County	#	%	#	%	#	%	#	%	Total votes cast
Appling	212	82.49%	44	17.12%	1	0.39%	168	65.37%	257
Atkinson	394	90.37%	25	5.73%	17	3.90%	369	84.63%	436
Bacon	961	91.09%	79	7.49%	15	1.42%	882	83.60%	1,055
Baker	245	89.74%	21	7.69%	7	2.56%	224	82.05%	273
Baldwin	826	83.94%	107	10.87%	51	5.18%	719	73.07%	984
Banks	291	74.05%	86	21.88%	16	4.07%	205	52.16%	393
Barrow	501	65.75%	88	11.55%	173	22.70%	328 (Note: In this county where Coolidge ran third behind Davis and La Follette, margin given is Davis vote minus La Follette vote and percentage margin Davis percentage minus La Follette percentage.)	43.04%	762
Bartow	846	60.73%	482	34.60%	65	4.67%	364	26.13%	1,393
Ben Hill	507	59.86%	150	17.71%	190	22.43%	317	37.43%	847
Berrien	409	94.68%	13	3.01%	10	2.31%	396	91.67%	432
Bibb	3,647	83.17%	455	10.38%	283	6.45%	3,192	72.79%	4,385
Bleckley	367	90.62%	21	5.19%	17	4.20%	346	85.43%	405
Brantley	238	85.30%	9	3.23%	32	11.47%	206	73.84%	279
Brooks	1,179	89.25%	128	9.69%	14	1.06%	1,051	79.56%	1,321
Bryan	196	94.23%	9	4.33%	3	1.44%	187	89.90%	208
Bulloch	989	94.01%	37	3.52%	26	2.47%	952	90.49%	1,052
Burke	449	82.99%	76	14.05%	16	2.96%	373	68.95%	541
Butts	493	84.85%	50	8.61%	38	6.54%	443	76.25%	581
Calhoun	343	83.25%	66	16.02%	3	0.73%	277	67.23%	412
Camden	172	98.29%	1	0.57%	2	1.14%	170	97.14%	175
Campbell	477	93.90%	18	3.54%	13	2.56%	459	90.35%	508
Candler	241	89.59%	14	5.20%	14	5.20%	227	84.39%	269
Carroll	1,784	70.29%	526	20.72%	228	8.98%	1,258	49.57%	2,538
Catoosa	661	70.92%	242	25.97%	29	3.11%	419	44.96%	932
Charlton	151	84.83%	20	11.24%	7	3.93%	131	73.60%	178
Chatham	6,158	69.86%	1,800	20.42%	857	9.72%	4,358	49.44%	8,815
Chattahoochee	208	91.63%	14	6.17%	5	2.20%	194	85.46%	227
Chattooga	1,615	78.36%	412	19.99%	34	1.65%	1,203	58.37%	2,061
Cherokee	848	56.42%	601	39.99%	54	3.59%	247	16.43%	1,503
Clarke	1,530	82.26%	267	14.35%	63	3.39%	1,263	67.90%	1,860
Clay	246	74.32%	51	15.41%	34	10.27%	195	58.91%	331
Clayton	273	69.29%	46	11.68%	75	19.04%	198	50.25%	394
Clinch	235	88.68%	13	4.91%	17	6.42%	218	82.26%	265
Cobb	1,360	71.20%	362	18.95%	188	9.84%	998	52.25%	1,910
Coffee	510	78.46%	62	9.54%	78	12.00%	432	66.46%	650
Colquitt	1,572	81.79%	205	10.67%	145	7.54%	1,367	71.12%	1,922
Columbia	213	71.00%	47	15.67%	40	13.33%	166	55.33%	300
Cook	502	86.40%	44	7.57%	35	6.02%	458	78.83%	581
Coweta	1,010	90.42%	67	6.00%	40	3.58%	943	84.42%	1,117
Crawford	352	94.12%	7	1.87%	15	4.01%	337	90.11%	374
Crisp	439	92.23%	21	4.41%	16	3.36%	418	87.82%	476
Dade	563	75.98%	119	16.06%	59	7.96%	444	59.92%	741
Dawson	279	51.10%	264	48.35%	3	0.55%	15	2.75%	546
Decatur	637	69.09%	151	16.38%	134	14.53%	486	52.71%	922
DeKalb	2,277	70.26%	590	18.20%	374	11.54%	1,687	52.05%	3,241
Dodge	1,654	94.30%	91	5.19%	9	0.51%	1,563	89.11%	1,754
Dooly	590	92.62%	45	7.06%	2	0.31%	545	85.56%	637
Dougherty	1,065	81.05%	167	12.71%	82	6.24%	898	68.34%	1,314
Douglas	355	61.74%	86	14.96%	134	23.30%	221	38.43%	575
Early	351	80.69%	22	5.06%	62	14.25%	289	66.44%	435
Echols	482	97.37%	11	2.22%	2	0.40%	471	95.15%	495
Effingham	337	83.00%	39	9.61%	30	7.39%	298	73.40%	406
Elbert	1,024	79.56%	72	5.59%	191	14.84%	833	64.72%	1,287
Emanuel	710	91.73%	39	5.04%	25	3.23%	671	86.69%	774
Evans	790	95.41%	21	2.54%	17	2.05%	769	92.87%	828
Fannin	1,079	39.49%	1,650	60.40%	3	0.11%	-571	-20.90%	2,732
Fayette	257	79.57%	24	7.43%	42	13.00%	215	66.56%	323
Floyd	1,922	73.81%	470	18.05%	212	8.14%	1,452	55.76%	2,604
Forsyth	715	69.42%	298	28.93%	17	1.65%	417	40.49%	1,030
Franklin	618	73.31%	109	12.93%	116	13.76%	502	59.55%	843
Fulton	7,830	61.96%	3,229	25.55%	1,579	12.49%	4,601	36.41%	12,638
Gilmer	776	45.97%	912	54.03%	0	0.00%	-136	-8.06%	1,688
Glascock	111	54.15%	26	12.68%	68	33.17%	43	20.98%	205
Glynn	612	63.09%	283	29.18%	75	7.73%	329	33.92%	970
Gordon	875	65.30%	397	29.63%	68	5.07%	478	35.67%	1,340
Grady	1,449	92.06%	100	6.35%	25	1.59%	1,349	85.71%	1,574
Greene	558	71.45%	77	9.86%	146	18.69%	412	52.75%	781
Gwinnett	1,011	75.79%	207	15.52%	116	8.70%	804	60.27%	1,334
Habersham	808	67.79%	322	27.01%	62	5.20%	486	40.77%	1,192
Hall	1,398	75.04%	290	15.57%	175	9.39%	1,108	59.47%	1,863
Hancock	272	88.31%	22	7.14%	14	4.55%	250	81.17%	308
Haralson	447	36.19%	667	54.01%	121	9.80%	-220	-17.81%	1,235
Harris	457	88.39%	20	3.87%	40	7.74%	417	80.66%	517
Hart	857	76.72%	65	5.82%	195	17.46%	662	59.27%	1,117
Heard	327	88.62%	35	9.49%	7	1.90%	292	79.13%	369
Henry	594	83.19%	53	7.42%	67	9.38%	527	73.81%	714
Houston	1,611	94.27%	75	4.39%	23	1.35%	1,536	89.88%	1,709
Irwin	268	82.72%	35	10.80%	21	6.48%	233	71.91%	324
Jackson	993	81.80%	142	11.70%	79	6.51%	851	70.10%	1,214
Jasper	448	85.33%	68	12.95%	9	1.71%	380	72.38%	525
Jeff Davis	122	73.05%	39	23.35%	6	3.59%	83	49.70%	167
Jefferson	502	73.61%	103	15.10%	77	11.29%	399	58.50%	682
Jenkins	200	83.33%	16	6.67%	24	10.00%	176	73.33%	240
Johnson	1,058	77.34%	194	14.18%	116	8.48%	864	63.16%	1,368
Jones	414	93.45%	26	5.87%	3	0.68%	388	87.58%	443
Lamar	594	89.46%	38	5.72%	32	4.82%	556	83.73%	664
Lanier	356	88.34%	46	11.41%	1	0.25%	310	76.92%	403
Laurens	1,127	86.76%	121	9.31%	51	3.93%	1,006	77.44%	1,299
Lee	211	86.12%	23	9.39%	11	4.49%	188	76.73%	245
Liberty	334	80.29%	39	9.38%	43	10.34%	291	69.95%	416
Lincoln	847	67.01%	121	9.57%	296	23.42%	551	43.59%	1,264
Long	499	88.48%	19	3.37%	46	8.16%	453	80.32%	564
Lowndes	1,095	90.42%	57	4.71%	59	4.87%	1,036	85.55%	1,211
Lumpkin	357	74.69%	111	23.22%	10	2.09%	246	51.46%	478
Macon	649	86.53%	52	6.93%	49	6.53%	597	79.60%	750
Madison	504	73.47%	121	17.64%	61	8.89%	383	55.83%	686
Marion	272	84.74%	31	9.66%	18	5.61%	241	75.08%	321
McDuffie	267	47.68%	37	6.61%	256	45.71%	11	1.96%	560
McIntosh	127	73.41%	44	25.43%	2	1.16%	83	47.98%	173
Meriwether	886	66.57%	103	7.74%	342	25.69%	544	40.87%	1,331
Miller	126	68.85%	45	24.59%	12	6.56%	81	44.26%	183
Milton	224	68.29%	53	16.16%	51	15.55%	171	52.13%	328
Mitchell	736	87.83%	51	6.09%	51	6.09%	685	81.74%	838
Monroe	672	87.61%	64	8.34%	31	4.04%	608	79.27%	767
Montgomery	353	77.92%	87	19.21%	13	2.87%	266	58.72%	453
Morgan	598	77.86%	126	16.41%	44	5.73%	472	61.46%	768
Murray	818	53.43%	648	42.33%	65	4.25%	170	11.10%	1,531
Muscogee	2,067	85.59%	218	9.03%	130	5.38%	1,849	76.56%	2,415
Newton	716	75.37%	139	14.63%	95	10.00%	577	60.74%	950
Oconee	279	72.09%	46	11.89%	62	16.02%	217	56.07%	387
Oglethorpe	1,748	88.96%	129	6.56%	88	4.48%	1,619	82.39%	1,965
Paulding	419	45.40%	378	40.95%	126	13.65%	41	4.44%	923
Pickens	754	39.54%	1,149	60.25%	4	0.21%	-395	-20.71%	1,907
Pierce	397	79.24%	83	16.57%	21	4.19%	314	62.67%	501
Pike	895	88.79%	41	4.07%	72	7.14%	823	81.65%	1,008
Polk	803	55.73%	481	33.38%	157	10.90%	322	22.35%	1,441
Pulaski	442	89.84%	29	5.89%	21	4.27%	413	83.94%	492
Putnam	457	97.65%	7	1.50%	4	0.85%	450	96.15%	468
Quitman	138	92.00%	8	5.33%	4	2.67%	130	86.67%	150
Rabun	454	76.56%	117	19.73%	22	3.71%	337	56.83%	593
Randolph	518	78.96%	88	13.41%	50	7.62%	430	65.55%	656
Richmond	2,169	56.43%	1,296	33.71%	379	9.86%	873	22.71%	3,844
Rockdale	382	88.02%	24	5.53%	28	6.45%	354	81.57%	434
Schley	266	94.66%	12	4.27%	3	1.07%	254	90.39%	281
Screven	821	71.70%	288	25.15%	36	3.14%	533	46.55%	1,145
Seminole	201	82.04%	24	9.80%	20	8.16%	177	72.24%	245
Spalding	1,257	88.52%	75	5.28%	88	6.20%	1,169	82.32%	1,420
Stephens	523	87.31%	40	6.68%	36	6.01%	483	80.63%	599
Stewart	408	87.74%	24	5.16%	33	7.10%	375	80.65%	465
Sumter	1,225	83.79%	124	8.48%	113	7.73%	1,101	75.31%	1,462
Talbot	491	93.35%	33	6.27%	2	0.38%	458	87.07%	526
Taliaferro	228	77.82%	4	1.37%	61	20.82%	167	57.00%	293
Tattnall	1,100	83.65%	66	5.02%	149	11.33%	951	72.32%	1,315
Taylor	370	76.13%	96	19.75%	20	4.12%	274	56.38%	486
Telfair	1,382	78.66%	264	15.03%	111	6.32%	1,118	63.63%	1,757
Terrell	630	90.52%	45	6.47%	21	3.02%	585	84.05%	696
Thomas	1,280	87.49%	115	7.86%	68	4.65%	1,165	79.63%	1,463
Tift	522	87.73%	33	5.55%	40	6.72%	482	81.01%	595
Toombs	314	83.07%	32	8.47%	32	8.47%	282	74.60%	378
Towns	604	44.02%	765	55.76%	3	0.22%	-161	-11.73%	1,372
Treutlen	222	88.10%	27	10.71%	3	1.19%	195	77.38%	252
Troup	1,422	84.44%	165	9.80%	97	5.76%	1,257	74.64%	1,684
Turner	338	63.06%	166	30.97%	32	5.97%	172	32.09%	536
Twiggs	417	85.80%	39	8.02%	30	6.17%	378	77.78%	486
Union	793	50.61%	719	45.88%	55	3.51%	74	4.72%	1,567
Upson	484	83.30%	37	6.37%	60	10.33%	424	72.98%	581
Walker	1,740	65.12%	878	32.86%	54	2.02%	862	32.26%	2,672
Walton	873	85.17%	90	8.78%	62	6.05%	783	76.39%	1,025
Ware	1,497	75.00%	216	10.82%	283	14.18%	1,214	60.82%	1,996
Warren	253	65.37%	36	9.30%	98	25.32%	155	40.05%	387
Washington	758	78.55%	130	13.47%	77	7.98%	628	65.08%	965
Wayne	409	81.31%	33	6.56%	61	12.13%	348	69.18%	503
Webster	140	87.50%	10	6.25%	10	6.25%	130	81.25%	160
Wheeler	772	88.84%	0	0.00%	97	11.16%	675	77.68%	869
White	476	73.23%	158	24.31%	16	2.46%	318	48.92%	650
Whitfield	1,236	61.92%	668	33.47%	92	4.61%	568	28.46%	1,996
Wilcox	431	87.96%	21	4.29%	38	7.76%	393	80.20%	490
Wilkes	836	77.77%	44	4.09%	195	18.14%	641	59.63%	1,075
Wilkinson	284	80.45%	56	15.86%	13	3.68%	228	64.59%	353
Worth	616	84.27%	40	5.47%	75	10.26%	541	74.01%	731
Totals	123,200	73.96%	30,300	18.19%	12,691	7.62%	92,900	55.77%	166,577

== See also ==
- United States presidential elections in Georgia
