= Hiram College =

Private liberal arts college in Hiram, Ohio, US

Coordinates: 41.310255°N 81.146145°W

- Former names: Western Reserve Eclectic Institute (1850-1867)
- Motto: Fiat Lux (Latin)
- Motto in English: Let there be light
- Type: Private liberal arts college
- Established: March 1, 1850; 176 years ago
- Academic affiliations: Annapolis Group; NEOMED; Shoals Marine Lab
- President: Robert E. Bohrer II
- Faculty: 104 (fall 2023)
- Students: 1,061 (fall 2024)
- Undergraduates: 1,026 (fall 2024)
- Postgraduates: 35 (fall 2024)
- Location: Hiram, Ohio, U.S.
- Campus: College town, 110-acre (0.45 km^{2})
- Colors: (Union blue, Infantry blue, Crimson)
- Nickname: Terriers
- Sporting affiliations: NCAA Division III — PAC
- Website: hiram.edu
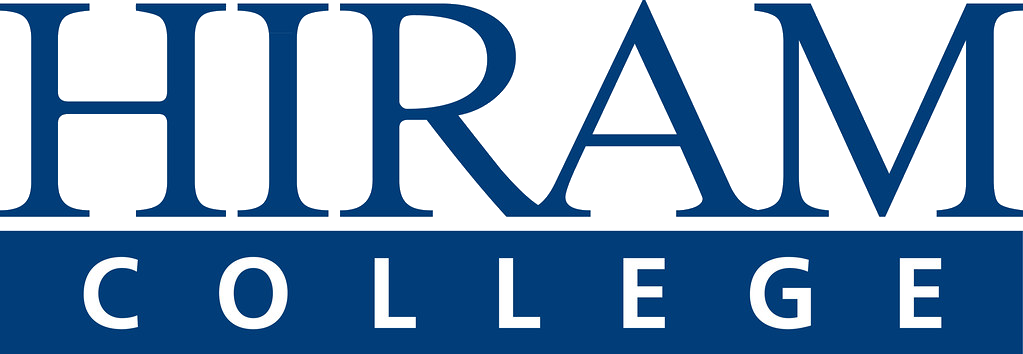

Hiram College (/ˈhaɪrəm/ HY-rəm) is a private liberal arts college in Hiram, Ohio, United States. It was founded in 1850 as the Western Reserve Eclectic Institute by Amos Sutton Hayden and other members of the Christian Church (Disciples of Christ). The college is nonsectarian and coeducational. It is accredited by the Higher Learning Commission. Among its alumni is the 20th president of the United States, James A. Garfield, who also served as an instructor and administrator at Hiram.

== History ==
On June 12, 1849, representatives of the Christian Church (Disciples of Christ) voted to establish an academic institution, later called Hiram College. On November 7, they chose the village of Hiram as the site because they considered that part of the Connecticut Western Reserve to be "healthful and free of distractions." On December 20, they named the school the Western Reserve Eclectic Institute.

Western Reserve Eclectic Institute, Hiram, 1858

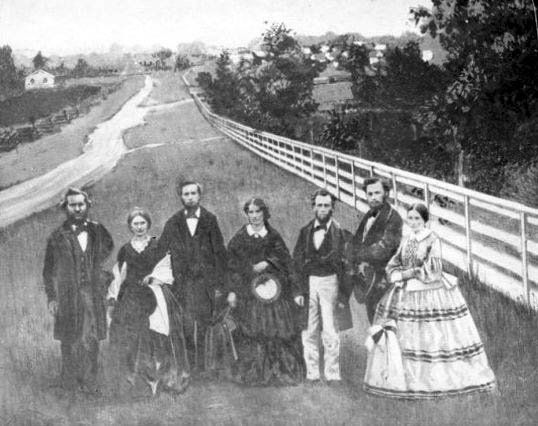
James A. Garfield (left), his wife Lucretia Rudolph Garfield (right) and other faculty in 1858

The institute's original charter was authorized by the state legislature on March 1, 1850, and the school opened several months later, on November 27. Many of the students came from the surrounding farms and villages of the Western Reserve, but students began arriving from other states. On February 20, 1867, the Institute incorporated as a college and changed its name to Hiram College.

During the years before it was renamed Hiram College, 1850–1867, the school had seven principals, the equivalent of today's college presidents. Two of them were especially influential: Disciple minister Amos Sutton Hayden, who led the school through its first six years, and James A. Garfield, an alumnus who returned in 1856 as a teacher. As principal, Garfield expanded the institute's curriculum. He left the institute in 1861 and in 1880 was elected the 20th president of the United States.

In 1870, one of Garfield's best friends and former students, Burke A. Hinsdale, was appointed Hiram's president. Although there were two before him, Hinsdale is considered the college's first permanent president because the others served only briefly. President Ely V. Zollars increased enrollment, established a substantial endowment, and created a program for the construction of campus buildings.

In 1931, shortly before Hiram celebrated the 100th anniversary of Garfield's birth, there was a debate in the community about changing the name of the school to Garfield College. There were strong advocates on both sides of the issue. Among the 2,000 guests at the centennial celebration were three generations of Garfield's family, including two of his sons. The idea of changing the college's name was not mentioned at the event, and the idea was abandoned.

=== College Reorganization (2016–2020) ===
In response to enrollment challenges in the early 2000s, Hiram College underwent a comprehensive structural reorganization beginning in 2016. The restructuring resulted in the consolidation of academic departments into five interdisciplinary schools: the School of Arts, Humanity, and Culture; the School of Business and Communications; the School of Education, Leadership, and Social Change; the School of Health and Medical Humanities; and the School of Science and Technology.

During this period, the college adopted a model branded as the "New Liberal Arts," which included the "Tech and Trek" initiative. This program was noted as the first 1-to-1 mobile technology initiative at an Ohio liberal arts college.

Following her departure in 2020, President Lori Varlotta was named President Emerita. In recognition of her leadership during the restructuring, the college's Board of Trustees designated the central campus quadrangle as "Varlotta Green."

=== Principals and presidents ===
The following is a list of the school's leaders since its founding in 1850.

==== Principals (Western Reserve Eclectic Institute) ====
- 1850–1856 – Amos Sutton Hayden
- 1857–1861 – James A. Garfield
- 1861–1864 – Harvey W. Everest (Pro Tem)
- 1864–1865 – C. W. Heywood (acting)
- 1865–1866 – Adoniram J. Thomson (managing)
- 1866–1867 – John M. Atwater

==== Presidents (Hiram College) ====
- 1867–1868 – Silas E. Shepard (acting)
- 1868–1870 – John M. Atwater (acting)
- 1870–1882 – Burke A. Hinsdale
- 1883–1887 – George M. Laughlin
- 1887–1888 – Colman Bancroft (acting)
- 1888–1902 – Ely V. Zollars
- 1902–1903 – James A. Beattie
- 1903–1905 – Edmund B. Wakefield (acting)
- 1905–1907 – Carlos C. Rowlison
- 1907–1930 – Miner Lee Bates
- 1930–1940 – Kenneth I. Brown
- 1940–1957 – Paul H. Fall
- 1957–1965 – Paul F. Sharp
- 1965–1965 – James N. Primm
- 1966–1966 – Wendell G. Johnson (acting)
- 1966–1985 – Elmer Jagow
- 1986–1989 – Russell Aiuto
- 1989–1989 – James Norton (interim)
- 1990–2000 – G. Benjamin Oliver
- 2000–2002 – Richard J. Scaldini
- 2003–2014 – Thomas V. Chema
- 2014–2020 – Lori E. Varlotta
- 2020–2023 – David P. Haney
- 2023-2026 – Robert E. Bohrer II
- 2026-Present - James A. Malz (interim)

=== James H. Barrow Field Station ===
In 1967, Paul and Maxine Frohring donated their recently acquired 75 acres of land in Garrettsville to Hiram College to promote wildlife research. James H. Barrow, a biology professor at the college, founded the Hiram Biological Station on the land, causing the place to later be named in his honor in 1985. Originally, the property had a beech-maple forest, a stream and a bog, but over the years it grew into over 500 acres containing forests, fields, ponds, wetlands, and more. The Frohring Forest–150 acres of mature beech-maple trees–Silver Creek, Eagle Creek, and the Observation Pond–which has many waterfowl species, along with a pair of trumpeter swans–are some of the Field Stations' most well-known natural attractions. The property also contains multiple public hiking trails, and eleven facilities for different uses such as teaching, housing animals, research, and so on. Two of the most notable buildings are the Frohring Laboratory, which uses geothermal heating and cooling and was the first LEED certified building at Hiram, and also houses a miniature indoor aquarium with different breeds of fish, amphibians, reptiles, and occasionally mammals. The other is the Endangered Waterfowl Conservation Facility, which houses multiple different breeds of endangered birds and allows students to gain valuable hands-on experience.

A unique program established by the Field Station is the Grassland Program. Beginning in 2011, Land Stewardship Manager Emliss Ricks has been working on establishing grasslands in three locations on the property.

== Academics ==
Academic rankings

Regional
- U.S. News & World Report: 10

National
- Forbes: 639

As of 2025, Hiram's student body consists of 777 degree-seeking students from 31 states and 7 foreign countries. Hiram specializes in the education of undergraduate students, though the college does have a small graduate program. Hiram confers the Bachelor of Arts, Bachelor of Science in Nursing, and Master of Arts degrees. The college offers 30 majors and 38 minors for traditional undergraduates, in addition to pre-professional programs for specific fields. Interdisciplinary studies have also been a part of Hiram's curriculum for decades.

Hiram's academic program consists of four schools: Arts, Humantities & Politics; Business & Communication; Health, Education, Sustainability & Society; and Science & Technology. The college's curriculum is marketed under the name Hiram Connect, which involves four steps: First Year Colloquium/Foundations of the Liberal Arts, Declaration of Major, Experiential Learning, and a Capstone Project. Hiram has five centers for interdisciplinary studies: Center for Integrated Entrepreneurship, Center for Scientific Engagement, Center for Literature and Medicine, Garfield Institute for Public Leadership, and Lindsay-Crane Center for Writing and Literature.

=== Rankings ===
Hiram is a member of the Annapolis Group, which has been critical of the college rankings process. Hiram is among the signatories of the Presidents Letter. In the 2026 U.S. News & World Report college rankings, it was ranked tenth out of 89 regional liberal arts colleges in the Midwestern United States. Hiram has regularly been included in The Princeton Review Best Colleges guide, and is one of 40 schools included in Loren Pope's book Colleges That Change Lives.

== Student life ==
=== Athletics ===
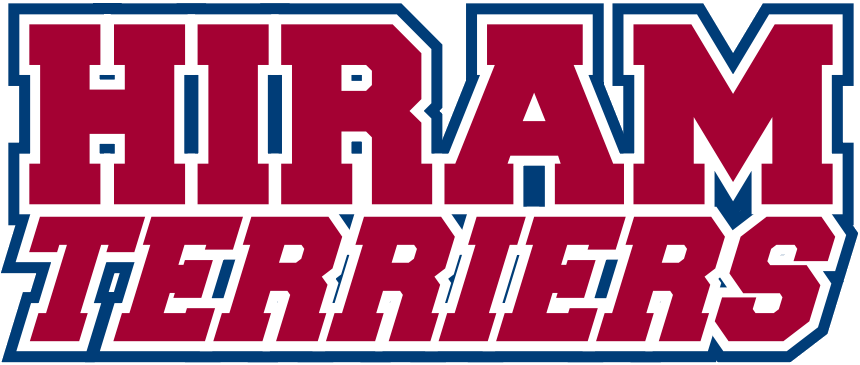
Hiram athletics wordmark

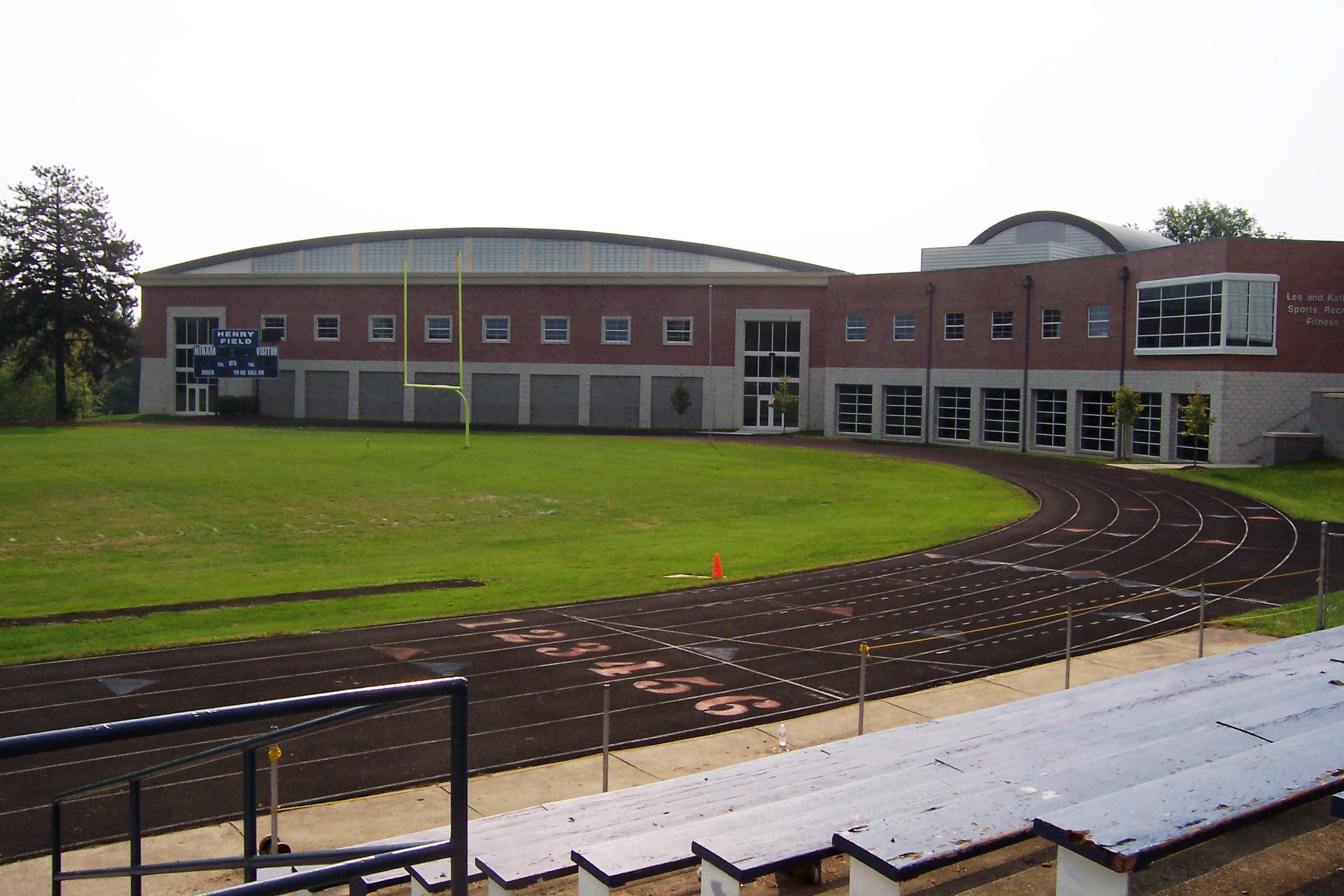
Football field at Coleman Sports Complex

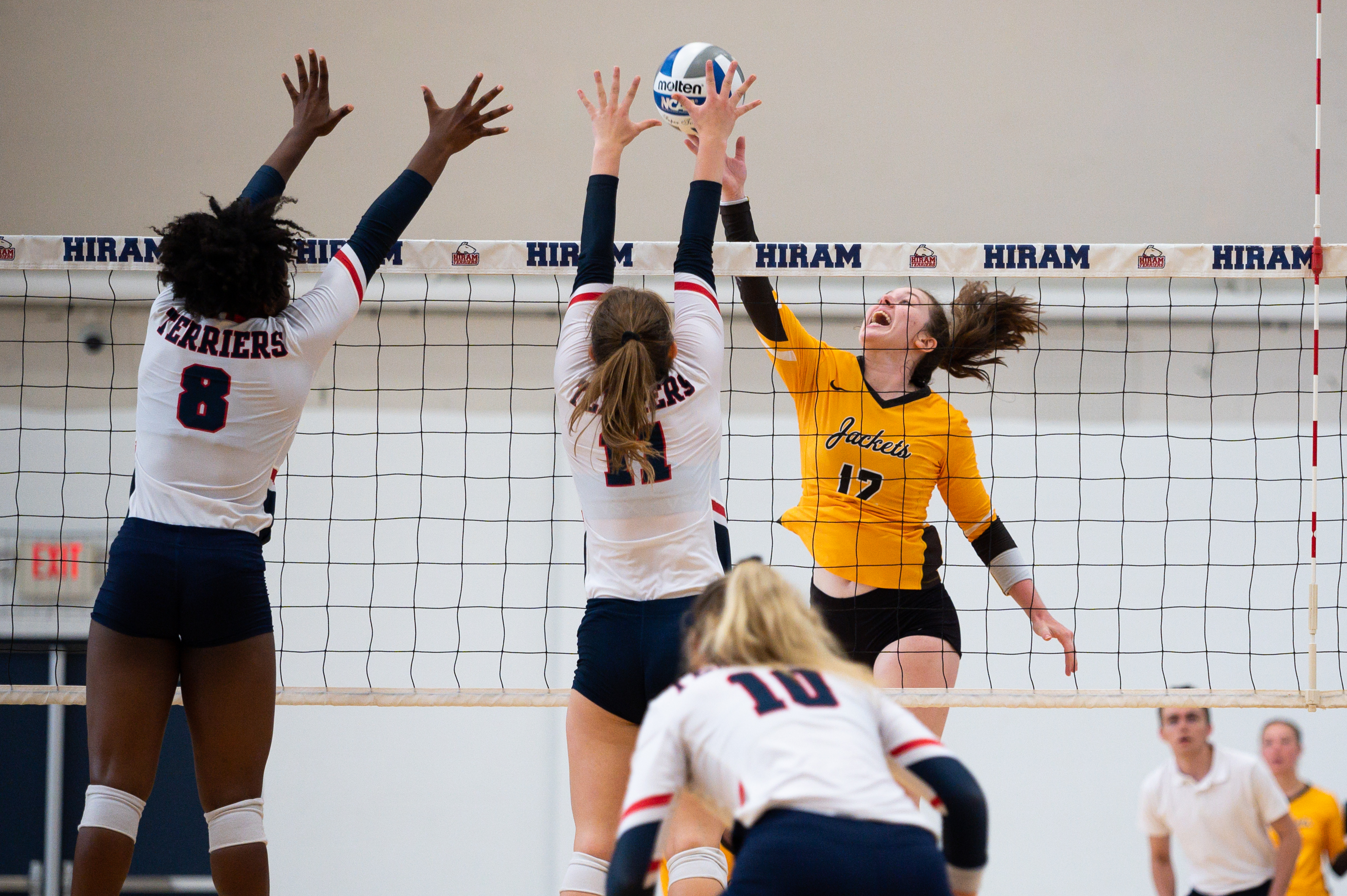
Hiram (in white) v Baldwin Wallace, volleyball match, 2019

The school's sports teams are called the Terriers. They participate in NCAA Division III and the North Coast Athletic Conference. In men's volleyball and men's wrestling, sports not sponsored by the NCAC, Hiram competes in the Allegheny Mountain Collegiate Conference. Stunt, an all-female cheerleading discipline included in the NCAA Emerging Sports for Women program, competes in the Great Midwest Athletic Conference.

Hiram will join the Presidents' Athletic Conference (PAC) for administrative purposes on July 1, 2024, coinciding with its move to that conference as a men's volleyball associate. It will continue to compete in other NCAC sports through the 2024–25 school year before fully joining the PAC. Hiram had been a full PAC member from 1971 to 1989.

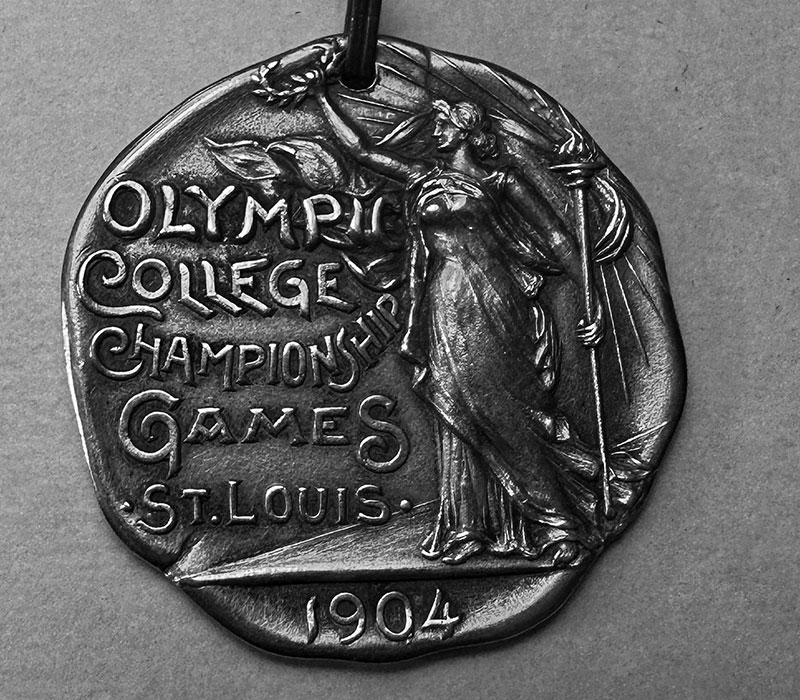
Gold medal won by the 1903–04 Hiram men's basketball team at the 1904 Olympic Games in St. Louis.

The Hiram College basketball team won the gold medal in the collegiate division of the 1904 Summer Olympics in St. Louis. It was the first time that basketball was part of an Olympics; it was included as a demonstration sport and no foreign teams participated.

The Cleveland Browns held their training camp at Hiram College from 1952 through 1974, making it the longest–tenured training site in the team's history.

=== Student clubs and organizations ===
Student Senate is the elected student governing body of the college. It serves as a liaison between students and the school's administration, and oversees all student clubs and organizations, collectively called the Associated Student Organizations (ASO). The Kennedy Center Programming Board (KCPB) falls under the auspices of Student Senate, and is responsible for planning educational, social, recreational, and cultural programs.

Hiram has close to 50 registered student clubs and organizations in eight categories: Academic, Greek Social, Musical, Political and Activism, Publications and Communications, Religious, Special Interest and Service, and Sports and Recreation. Fraternities and sororities are not permitted on campus, but there are Greek social clubs.

Since 1971, Hiram has maintained a chapter of Phi Beta Kappa, the national honor society for the liberal arts. The school has also had a chapter of Omicron Delta Kappa (ODK), a national leadership honor society, since 1962.

== Gallery ==
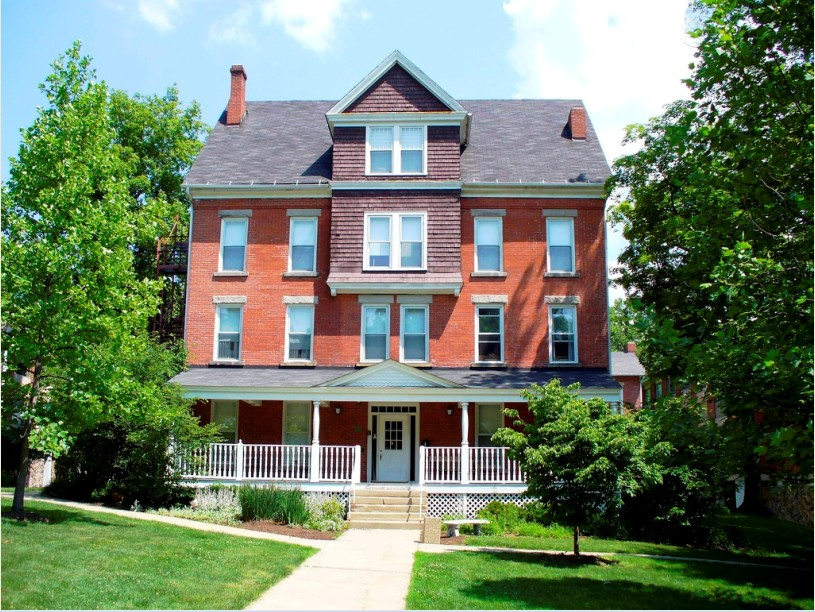
Bowler Hall

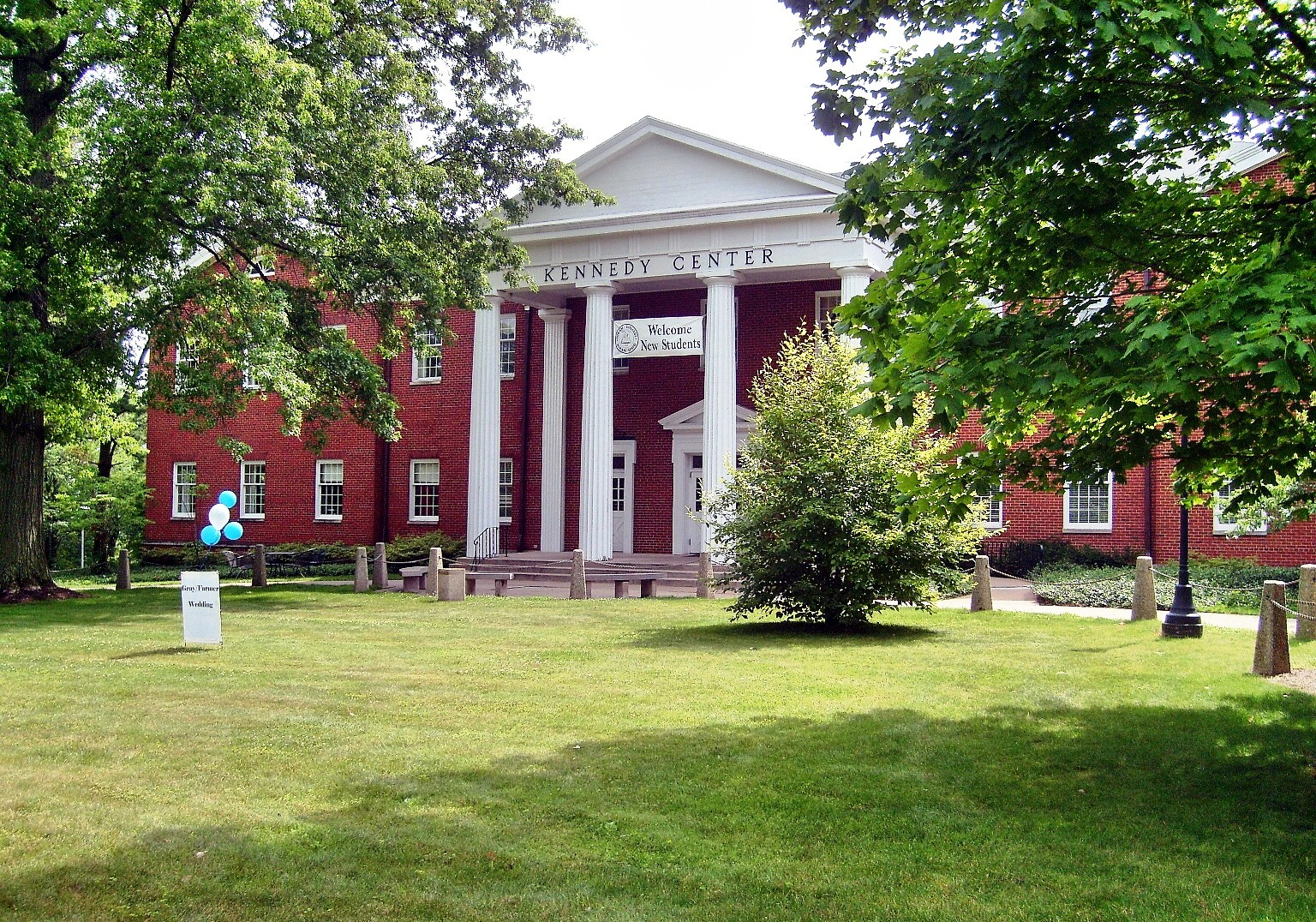
Kennedy Center student union

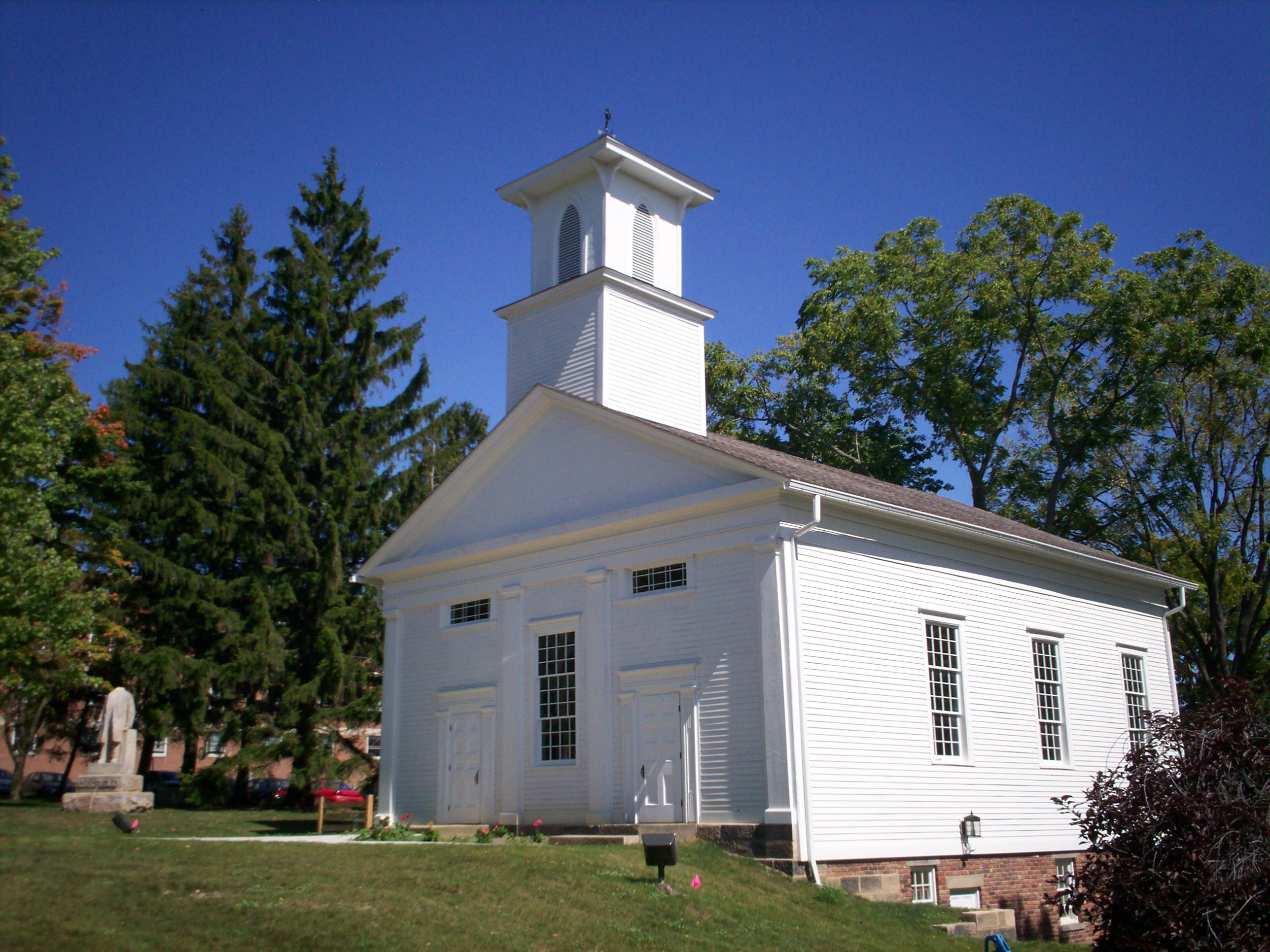
Koritansky Hall

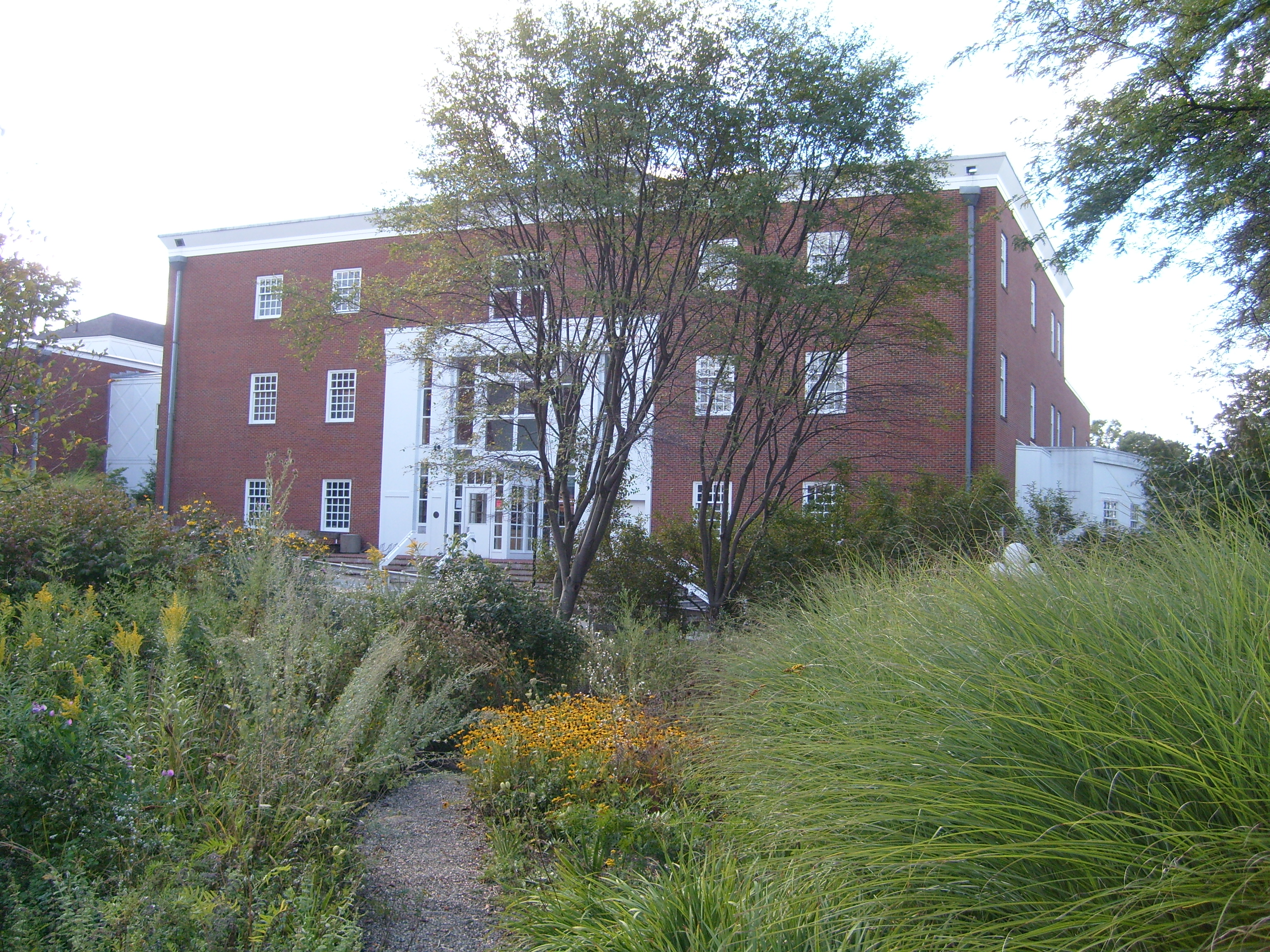
Library

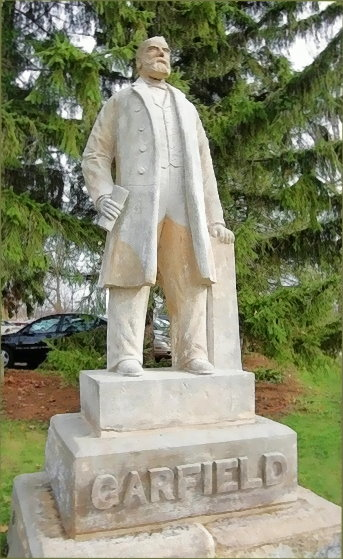
James A. Garfield statue

== Notable alumni and faculty ==
- Jean Ankeney – politician, nurse
- Edna Allyn – first librarian of the Hawaii State Library
- Miner Searle Bates – historian, and college professor and administrator
- Laura Bell – author
- Robert Biscup – orthopedic surgeon
- Howard Junior Brown – physician, gay rights advocate
- Henry Lawrence Burnett – lawyer
- Allen R. Bushnell – U.S. Representative
- Russell L. Caldwell – historian and college professor
- James Anson Campbell – industrialist
- Sharon Creech – author
- Martha Derthick – academic
- Fritz Dreisbach – artist
- Virginia Fraser – elder rights activist
- Holly Fulger – actress, television host, entrepreneur
- James A. Garfield – 20th President of the United States
- Lucretia Rudolph Garfield – First Lady of the United States
- Franklin L. Gilson – jurist and politician
- Osee M. Hall – U.S. Representative
- Pamela Helming - New York State Senator
- Ammon Hennacy – Christian pacifist, anarchist, and member of the Catholic Worker Movement
- David Brendan Hopes – author, playwright, and poet
- Jan Hopkins – anchor, CNN
- Deborah Joseph – computer scientist
- John Samuel Kenyon – linguist
- Frank Laporte – professional baseball player
- Vachel Lindsay – poet
- Lance Liotta – cancer biologist
- James Kirby Martin - Historian
- J. Kevin McMahon – President and CEO, Pittsburgh Cultural Trust
- Clara Worst Miller – Ashland College professor of Latin and writer
- Louis Mink – philosopher of history and college professor
- Horace Ladd Moore – U.S. Representative
- Wendy Murray – journalist
- Gilbert Nations - lawyer, professor, and anti-Catholic activist
- Carol Z. Perez – U.S. Ambassador to Chile
- Augustus Herman Pettibone – U.S. Representative
- Benjamin D. Pritchard – Brevetted Brigadier General, United States Army
- Dean A. Scarborough – chief executive officer of Avery Dennison Corporation
- Platt Rogers Spencer – originator of Spencarian penmanship
- Mark W. Spong – roboticist
- Michael Stanley – singer–songwriter, musician, and radio personality
- Claude Steele – social psychologist, college professor, and college administrator
- Phebe Temperance Sutliff - educator; lady principal, Hiram College; president, Rockford College
- Howard F. Taylor – sociologist
- Emma Rood Tuttle — writer, poet
- Allyn Vine – physicist and oceanographer
- P. H. Welshimer – minister
- Tom Wesselmann – artist
- John J. Whitacre – U.S. Representative
- Bill White – professional baseball player and broadcaster; President, National League
- Dempster Woodworth – editor, politician and physician
- Laurin D. Woodworth – U.S. Representative
- Harold Bell Wright – author
- Allyn Abbott Young – economist
- Elizabeth MacLeod Walls – 15th President of William Jewell College and 14th President of Washington & Jefferson College
