= 1924 United States presidential election in Tennessee =

- November 4, 1924

All 12 Tennessee votes to the Electoral College

Nominee	John W. Davis	Calvin Coolidge
Party	Democratic	Republican
Home state	West Virginia	Massachusetts
Running mate	Charles W. Bryan	Charles G. Dawes
Electoral vote	12	0
Popular vote	158,682	130,728
Percentage	52.86%	43.54%
County results
Davis
40–50%
50–60%
60–70%
70–80%
80–90%
90–100%
Coolidge
40–50%
50–60%
60–70%
70–80%
80–90%
90–100%
President before election
Calvin Coolidge
Republican
Elected President
Calvin Coolidge
Republican

The 1924 United States presidential election in Tennessee took place on November 4, 1924, as part of the 1924 United States presidential election. Voters chose 12 representatives, or electors, to the Electoral College, who voted for president and vice president.

For over a century after the Civil War, Tennessee was divided according to political loyalties established in that war. Unionist regions covering almost all of East Tennessee, Kentucky Pennyroyal-allied Macon County, and the five West Tennessee Highland Rim counties of Carroll, Henderson, McNairy, Hardin and Wayne voted Republican – generally by landslide margins – as they saw the Democratic Party as the "war party" who had forced them into a war they did not wish to fight. Contrariwise, the rest of Middle and West Tennessee who had supported and driven the state's secession was equally fiercely Democratic as it associated the Republicans with Reconstruction. After the disfranchisement of the state's African-American population by a poll tax was largely complete in the 1890s, the Democratic Party was certain of winning statewide elections if united, although unlike the Deep South Republicans would almost always gain thirty to forty percent of the statewide vote from mountain and Highland Rim support. When the Democratic Party was bitterly divided, the Republicans did win the governorship in 1910 and 1912, but did not gain at other levels.

The 1920 election saw a significant but not radical change, whereby by moving into a small number of traditionally Democratic areas in Middle Tennessee and expanding turnout due to the Nineteenth Amendment and powerful isolationist sentiment, the Republican Party was able to capture Tennessee's presidential electoral votes and win the governorship and take three congressional seats in addition to the rock-ribbed GOP First and Second Districts. In 1922, with the ebbing of isolationist sympathy and a consequent decline in turnout, the Democratic Party regained the three seats lost in 1920 and also regained Tennessee's governorship under Austin Peay, later to become notorious for attempting to prohibit the teaching of evolution.

During the deeply divided Democratic presidential primaries and 1924 Democratic National Convention, Governor Peay was Tennessee's main representative Despite Tennessee's strong prohibitionist leanings and "Bible Belt" anti-Catholicism, it was thought popular Catholic New York Governor Al Smith would have to carry the state at this convention to win the Democratic nomination. However, in May, Tennessee went to Smith's rival William Gibbs McAdoo, who represented the rural, southern, historically secessionist and prohibitionist wing of the party.

Ultimately neither Smith nor McAdoo could prove acceptable to all Democratic delegates and the nomination went to a compromise candidate in Wall Street lawyer John W. Davis of West Virginia. Although West Virginia was a border state whose limited African-American population had not been disenfranchised as in all former Confederate States, Davis did share the extreme social conservatism of Southern Democrats of his era. He supported poll taxes, opposed women's suffrage, and believed in strictly limited government with no expansion in nonmilitary fields. At the same time a progressive third-party run was predicted as early as winter 1923–24, and ultimately Wisconsin Senator Robert M. La Follette Sr. would be nominated by the "Committee for Progressive Political Action".

== Campaign ==
The possibility of large La Follette votes in the Midwest and West tying up the Electoral College led Coolidge and Davis to give major priority to Tennessee and the border states – where Progressive candidate Robert M. La Follette generally had little appeal – in the early fall campaigns. In polling from the beginning of October, Tennessee was without representation, but at the end of that month it was rated as doubtful between Coolidge and Davis, although during the third week of that month, Davis himself had said he would carry the state by thirty to fifty thousand votes.

At the beginning of November, a drift to Coolidge was predicted by the New York Times, though Davis was still expected to carry the state by fewer than twenty thousand votes. As it proved, Davis won Tennessee by slightly more than the New York Times expected – with a twenty-eight-thousand vote plurality. Although La Follette would relegate Davis to third in twelve states and carry his home state of Wisconsin, he had very little appeal amongst Tennessee's poll-tax-restricted electorate, with the exception of small nitrate-mining communities in and around Grundy County where he even ran second ahead of Coolidge. It was predicted in the latest polls that La Follette would gain less than ten percent of Tennessee's ballots, and in the end he finished with only 3.55%, making Tennessee La Follette's fourth-weakest state nationwide.

As of 2024, Coolidge remains the last Republican to win the presidency without carrying Tennessee.

== Results ==
Presidential Candidate	Running Mate	Party	Electoral Vote (EV)	Popular Vote (PV)	
John W. Davis of West Virginia	Charles W. Bryan	Democratic	12	158,682	52.86%
Calvin Coolidge	Charles G. Dawes	Republican	0	130,728	43.54%
Robert M. La Follette	Burton K. Wheeler	Progressive	0	10,610	3.53%
Herman P. Faris	Marie C. Brehm	Prohibition	0	100	0.03%
Gilbert Nations	Charles Hiram Randall	American	0	100	0.03%

=== Results by county ===
1924 United States presidential election in Tennessee by county
County	John W. Davis Democratic		Calvin Coolidge Republican		Robert M. La Follette Progressive		Various candidates Other parties		Margin		Total votes cast
County	#	%	#	%	#	%	#	%	#	%	Total votes cast
Anderson	548	25.31%	1,495	69.05%	108	4.99%	7	0.65%	-947	-43.74%	2,158
Bedford	1,799	64.60%	925	33.21%	59	2.12%	1	0.07%	874	31.38%	2,784
Benton	1,097	58.92%	714	38.35%	33	1.77%	9	0.97%	383	20.57%	1,853
Bledsoe	485	40.96%	690	58.28%	9	0.76%	0	0.00%	-205	-17.31%	1,184
Blount	968	25.51%	2,754	72.57%	35	0.92%	19	1.00%	-1,786	-47.06%	3,776
Bradley	999	35.40%	1,779	63.04%	36	1.28%	4	0.28%	-780	-27.64%	2,818
Campbell	648	18.25%	2,620	73.78%	283	7.97%	0	0.00%	-1,972	-55.53%	3,551
Cannon	581	66.17%	285	32.46%	12	1.37%	0	0.00%	296	33.71%	878
Carroll	1,962	45.98%	2,199	51.54%	94	2.20%	6	0.28%	-237	-5.55%	4,261
Carter	551	13.01%	3,657	86.33%	28	0.66%	0	0.00%	-3,106	-73.32%	4,236
Cheatham	868	81.20%	181	16.93%	14	1.31%	3	0.56%	687	64.27%	1,066
Chester	758	60.25%	484	38.47%	16	1.27%	0	0.00%	274	21.78%	1,258
Claiborne	1,091	36.86%	1,775	59.97%	94	3.18%	0	0.00%	-684	-23.11%	2,960
Clay	668	56.80%	488	41.50%	10	0.85%	5	0.85%	180	15.31%	1,171
Cocke	921	26.35%	2,556	73.13%	18	0.52%	0	0.00%	-1,635	-46.78%	3,495
Coffee	1,691	75.52%	488	21.80%	60	2.68%	0	0.00%	1,203	53.73%	2,239
Crockett	1,168	65.80%	587	33.07%	20	1.13%	0	0.00%	581	32.73%	1,775
Cumberland	538	35.63%	885	58.61%	87	5.76%	0	0.00%	-347	-22.98%	1,510
Davidson	11,363	65.69%	4,516	26.11%	1,322	7.64%	48	0.56%	6,847	39.58%	17,249
Decatur	877	51.71%	799	47.11%	20	1.18%	0	0.00%	78	4.60%	1,696
DeKalb	1,829	56.16%	1,406	43.17%	22	0.68%	0	0.00%	423	12.99%	3,257
Dickson	1,648	72.38%	516	22.66%	99	4.35%	7	0.61%	1,132	49.71%	2,270
Dyer	2,336	82.57%	478	16.90%	5	0.18%	5	0.35%	1,858	65.68%	2,824
Fayette	1,181	92.63%	65	5.10%	25	1.96%	2	0.31%	1,116	87.53%	1,273
Fentress	420	24.62%	1,197	70.16%	89	5.22%	0	0.00%	-777	-45.55%	1,706
Franklin	2,072	73.03%	707	24.92%	58	2.04%	0	0.00%	1,365	48.11%	2,837
Gibson	3,235	74.97%	1,037	24.03%	35	0.81%	4	0.19%	2,198	50.94%	4,311
Giles	2,509	76.94%	677	20.76%	75	2.30%	0	0.00%	1,832	56.18%	3,261
Grainger	651	30.59%	1,464	68.80%	13	0.61%	0	0.00%	-813	-38.20%	2,128
Greene	2,586	43.83%	3,282	55.63%	26	0.44%	3	0.10%	-696	-11.80%	5,897
Grundy	394	51.37%	173	22.56%	194	25.29%	3	0.78%	200 (Note: In this county where La Follette ran second ahead of Coolidge, margin given is Davis vote minus La Follette vote and percentage margin Davis percentage minus La Follette percentage.)	26.08%	764
Hamblen	1,317	48.56%	1,342	49.48%	53	1.95%	0	0.00%	-25	-0.92%	2,712
Hamilton	7,511	44.76%	8,421	50.18%	848	5.05%	0	0.00%	-910	-5.42%	16,780
Hancock	305	22.76%	1,028	76.72%	7	0.52%	0	0.00%	-723	-53.96%	1,340
Hardeman	1,586	83.52%	254	13.38%	55	2.90%	2	0.21%	1,332	70.14%	1,897
Hardin	618	34.39%	1,175	65.39%	4	0.22%	0	0.00%	-557	-31.00%	1,797
Hawkins	1,596	37.58%	2,600	61.22%	51	1.20%	0	0.00%	-1,004	-23.64%	4,247
Haywood	1,872	96.15%	60	3.08%	15	0.77%	0	0.00%	1,812	93.07%	1,947
Henderson	1,009	37.68%	1,616	60.34%	51	1.90%	1	0.07%	-607	-22.67%	2,677
Henry	2,478	77.36%	562	17.55%	143	4.46%	10	0.62%	1,916	59.82%	3,193
Hickman	922	73.29%	315	25.04%	21	1.67%	0	0.00%	607	48.25%	1,258
Houston	444	76.82%	97	16.78%	33	5.71%	2	0.69%	347	60.03%	576
Humphreys	1,005	79.89%	216	17.17%	37	2.94%	0	0.00%	789	62.72%	1,258
Jackson	1,074	74.69%	354	24.62%	10	0.70%	0	0.00%	720	50.07%	1,438
Jefferson	712	20.68%	2,699	78.39%	32	0.93%	0	0.00%	-1,987	-57.71%	3,443
Johnson	254	8.29%	2,799	91.35%	11	0.36%	0	0.00%	-2,545	-83.06%	3,064
Knox	6,935	36.53%	10,709	56.41%	1,340	7.06%	0	0.00%	-3,774	-19.88%	18,984
Lake	817	89.39%	87	9.52%	8	0.88%	1	0.22%	730	79.87%	913
Lauderdale	1,596	85.44%	242	12.96%	30	1.61%	0	0.00%	1,354	72.48%	1,868
Lawrence	2,185	47.34%	2,375	51.45%	56	1.21%	0	0.00%	-190	-4.12%	4,616
Lewis	310	58.94%	191	36.31%	25	4.75%	0	0.00%	119	22.62%	526
Lincoln	2,356	85.67%	357	12.98%	25	0.91%	6	0.44%	1,999	72.69%	2,744
Loudon	703	30.49%	1,533	66.48%	62	2.69%	4	0.35%	-830	-35.99%	2,302
Macon	689	27.43%	1,808	71.97%	15	0.60%	0	0.00%	-1,119	-44.55%	2,512
Madison	3,422	69.40%	1,110	22.51%	399	8.09%	0	0.00%	2,312	46.89%	4,931
Marion	1,036	46.84%	1,074	48.55%	102	4.61%	0	0.00%	-38	-1.72%	2,212
Marshall	1,696	81.34%	349	16.74%	40	1.92%	0	0.00%	1,347	64.60%	2,085
Maury	3,000	76.06%	844	21.40%	100	2.54%	0	0.00%	2,156	54.67%	3,944
McMinn	1,617	35.85%	2,654	58.85%	239	5.30%	0	0.00%	-1,037	-22.99%	4,510
McNairy	1,125	40.53%	1,625	58.54%	26	0.94%	0	0.00%	-500	-18.01%	2,776
Meigs	574	46.10%	657	52.77%	14	1.12%	0	0.00%	-83	-6.67%	1,245
Monroe	2,226	47.18%	2,480	52.56%	12	0.25%	0	0.00%	-254	-5.38%	4,718
Montgomery	1,946	66.10%	941	31.96%	51	1.73%	3	0.20%	1,005	34.14%	2,941
Moore	492	91.62%	41	7.64%	4	0.74%	0	0.00%	451	83.99%	537
Morgan	411	23.39%	1,103	62.78%	243	13.83%	0	0.00%	-692	-39.39%	1,757
Obion	3,223	85.51%	485	12.87%	61	1.62%	0	0.00%	2,738	72.65%	3,769
Overton	1,532	61.85%	900	36.33%	45	1.82%	0	0.00%	632	25.51%	2,477
Perry	494	64.49%	268	34.99%	4	0.52%	0	0.00%	226	29.50%	766
Pickett	643	48.56%	676	51.06%	5	0.38%	0	0.00%	-33	-2.49%	1,324
Polk	1,150	47.31%	1,247	51.30%	34	1.40%	0	0.00%	-97	-3.99%	2,431
Putnam	2,474	61.47%	1,489	36.99%	48	1.19%	7	0.35%	985	24.47%	4,018
Rhea	1,169	48.59%	1,168	48.55%	65	2.70%	2	0.17%	1	0.04%	2,404
Roane	795	30.75%	1,635	63.25%	139	5.38%	8	0.62%	-840	-32.50%	2,577
Robertson	1,645	85.50%	229	11.90%	38	1.98%	6	0.62%	1,416	73.60%	1,918
Rutherford	2,137	75.01%	680	23.87%	32	1.12%	0	0.00%	1,457	51.14%	2,849
Scott	274	13.22%	1,611	77.71%	188	9.07%	0	0.00%	-1,337	-64.50%	2,073
Sequatchie	374	59.74%	247	39.46%	5	0.80%	0	0.00%	127	20.29%	626
Sevier	448	11.23%	3,517	88.17%	24	0.60%	0	0.00%	-3,069	-76.94%	3,989
Shelby	13,696	59.37%	7,369	31.95%	2,002	8.68%	0	0.00%	6,327	27.43%	23,067
Smith	1,701	69.86%	700	28.75%	22	0.90%	6	0.49%	1,001	41.11%	2,429
Stewart	1,369	82.57%	264	15.92%	25	1.51%	0	0.00%	1,105	66.65%	1,658
Sullivan	3,313	58.90%	2,247	39.95%	65	1.16%	0	0.00%	1,066	18.95%	5,625
Sumner	2,631	84.25%	435	13.93%	57	1.83%	0	0.00%	2,196	70.32%	3,123
Tipton	1,917	87.98%	218	10.00%	40	1.84%	2	0.18%	1,699	77.97%	2,177
Trousdale	684	82.31%	143	17.21%	4	0.48%	0	0.00%	541	65.10%	831
Unicoi	381	20.02%	1,381	72.57%	135	7.09%	3	0.32%	-1,000	-52.55%	1,900
Union	368	18.73%	1,540	78.37%	57	2.90%	0	0.00%	-1,172	-59.64%	1,965
Van Buren	357	73.91%	123	25.47%	3	0.62%	0	0.00%	234	48.45%	483
Warren	1,356	72.17%	490	26.08%	23	1.22%	5	0.53%	866	46.09%	1,874
Washington	1,839	35.65%	3,243	62.87%	76	1.47%	0	0.00%	-1,404	-27.22%	5,158
Wayne	448	24.11%	1,398	75.24%	12	0.65%	0	0.00%	-950	-51.13%	1,858
Weakley	3,149	72.78%	1,154	26.67%	24	0.55%	0	0.00%	1,995	46.11%	4,327
White	1,162	70.17%	452	27.29%	42	2.54%	0	0.00%	710	42.87%	1,656
Williamson	1,626	84.86%	242	12.63%	48	2.51%	0	0.00%	1,384	72.23%	1,916
Wilson	2,043	76.78%	580	21.80%	26	0.98%	6	0.45%	1,463	54.98%	2,655
Totals	158,682	52.82%	130,728	43.52%	10,610	3.53%	200	0.13%	27,954	9.30%	300,220

== See also ==
- United States presidential elections in Tennessee
- 1924 United States Senate election in Tennessee
- 1924 Tennessee gubernatorial election
