= 1924 United States presidential election in Washington (state) =

- November 4, 1924

Nominee	Calvin Coolidge	Robert M. La Follette	John W. Davis
Party	Republican	Progressive	Democratic
Home state	Massachusetts	Wisconsin	West Virginia
Running mate	Charles G. Dawes	Burton K. Wheeler	Charles W. Bryan
Electoral vote	7	0	0
Popular vote	220,224	150,727	42,842
Percentage	52.24%	35.76%	10.16%
County results
Coolidge
40–50%
50–60%
60–70%
La Follette
40–50%
50–60%
President before election
Calvin Coolidge
Republican
Elected President
Calvin Coolidge
Republican

The 1924 United States presidential election in Washington took place on November 4, 1924. All contemporary forty-eight states took part of the 1924 United States presidential election, and Washington's voters selected seven voters to the Electoral College, who voted for president and vice president.

Rapid recovery of the economy from a sharp recession following World War I transformed the 1920s into a strongly Republican decade. Even the problematic issue of a farm depression had eased by the time of the election as prices recovered. It was also widely thought that the Teapot Dome scandal could do nothing to revive the Democrats as they were well known to have equally severe problems therewith via the fact that recently deceased Woodrow Wilson had paid one hundred and fifty thousand dollars in legal fees to nomination frontrunner William McAdoo.

The conservatism of Democratic nominee John W. Davis – the first presidential nominee since the American Civil War from an antebellum slave state and the only one ever from West Virginia – led those with more progressive views to desert the two major parties for the third-party candidacy of Progressive "Fighting Bob" La Follette. His campaign, based on improved labor laws, an end to US involvement in the politics of Latin America, and cheap credit for farmers, had major appeal in the West, and in Washington State La Follette won five of thirty-nine counties (including absolute majorities in the eastern counties of Franklin and Adams) and finished ahead of Davis in every county except far southeastern Garfield County and Columbia County.

== Results ==
General Election Results
Party	Pledged to	Elector	Votes
Republican Party	Calvin Coolidge	Mrs. Samuel D. Cosgrove	220,224
Republican Party	Calvin Coolidge	John L. Murray	219,019
Republican Party	Calvin Coolidge	W. J. Coates	218,943
Republican Party	Calvin Coolidge	R. M. Wright	218,858
Republican Party	Calvin Coolidge	Fred C. Stewart	218,854
Republican Party	Calvin Coolidge	Benjamin E. Thomas	218,778
Republican Party	Calvin Coolidge	L. E. Jesseph	218,143
Progressive Party	Robert M. La Follette	J. Q. Adams	150,727
Progressive Party	Robert M. La Follette	Edna Wright Beebe	150,213
Progressive Party	Robert M. La Follette	Charles G. Cole	150,137
Progressive Party	Robert M. La Follette	Annabelle Kennedy	150,103
Progressive Party	Robert M. La Follette	Fred J. Chamberlain	150,101
Progressive Party	Robert M. La Follette	Edgar C. Snyder	149,854
Progressive Party	Robert M. La Follette	C. O. Young	149,115
Democratic Party	John W. Davis	Jessie Irving	42,842
Democratic Party	John W. Davis	John B. Hanson	42,556
Democratic Party	John W. Davis	Joseph L. Keeler	42,444
Democratic Party	John W. Davis	Charles H. Keavy	42,440
Democratic Party	John W. Davis	Paul Newman	42,339
Democratic Party	John W. Davis	Edgar Swan	42,315
Democratic Party	John W. Davis	B. F. Billingsley	42,239
American Party	Gilbert Nations	H. O. Akin	5,991
American Party	Gilbert Nations	J. M. Borgenson	5,900
American Party	Gilbert Nations	J. W. Adams	5,838
American Party	Gilbert Nations	P. M. Woodall	5,823
American Party	Gilbert Nations	W. A. Arnold	5,809
American Party	Gilbert Nations	Charles W. Ayres	5,806
American Party	Gilbert Nations	O. E. Druse	5,669
Socialist Labor Party	Frank T. Johns	George B. Wilson	1,004
Socialist Labor Party	Frank T. Johns	Abraham L. Brearcliff	982
Socialist Labor Party	Frank T. Johns	William J. Chamberlain	974
Socialist Labor Party	Frank T. Johns	James F. Stark	966
Socialist Labor Party	Frank T. Johns	Daniel L. Barnett	952
Socialist Labor Party	Frank T. Johns	Samuel A. Witherspoon	951
Socialist Labor Party	Frank T. Johns	John C. Schafer	933
Workers Party	William Z. Foster	William H. Jones	761
Workers Party	William Z. Foster	Joseph Huvel	736
Workers Party	William Z. Foster	John W. Weppler	715
Workers Party	William Z. Foster	Henry G. Price	714
Workers Party	William Z. Foster	John Lawrie	711
Workers Party	William Z. Foster	George Halonen	694
Workers Party	William Z. Foster	Mike Kronholm	693
Votes cast (Note: Based on totals for highest elector on each ticket)			421,549

=== Results by county ===
County	Calvin Coolidge Republican		Robert M. La Follette Progressive		John W. Davis Democratic		Gilbert Nations American		Frank T. Johns Socialist Labor		William Z. Foster Workers		Margin (Note: Because La Follette finished ahead of Davis in Washington State as a whole, all vote and percentage margins given are Coolidge minus La Follette unless stated in the total for the county in question.)		Total votes cast (Note: Based on highest elector on each ticket)
County	#	%	#	%	#	%	#	%	#	%	#	%	#	%	Total votes cast
Adams	760	37.51%	1,036	51.14%	228	11.25%	0	0.00%	2	0.10%	0	0.00%	-276	-13.63%	2,026
Asotin	1,094	46.51%	728	30.95%	508	21.60%	15	0.64%	5	0.21%	2	0.09%	366	15.56%	2,352
Benton	1,812	45.33%	1,711	42.81%	437	10.93%	27	0.68%	4	0.10%	6	0.15%	101	2.52%	3,997
Chelan	4,543	55.56%	2,584	31.60%	995	12.17%	35	0.43%	19	0.23%	1	0.01%	1,959	23.96%	8,177
Clallam	2,129	52.07%	1,639	40.08%	283	6.92%	11	0.27%	17	0.42%	10	0.24%	490	11.99%	4,089
Clarke	5,215	47.61%	3,573	32.62%	2,004	18.29%	112	1.02%	33	0.30%	17	0.16%	1,642	14.99%	10,954
Columbia	1,122	52.11%	492	22.85%	522	24.25%	12	0.56%	3	0.14%	2	0.09%	600 (Note: In this county where Davis did run second ahead of La Follette, margin given is Coolidge vote minus Davis vote and percentage margin Coolidge percentage minus Davis percentage.)	27.86%	2,153
Cowlitz	3,274	55.66%	1,609	27.35%	927	15.76%	21	0.36%	34	0.58%	17	0.29%	1,665	28.31%	5,882
Douglas	1,070	42.19%	1,053	41.52%	398	15.69%	7	0.28%	5	0.20%	3	0.12%	17	0.67%	2,536
Ferry	507	34.49%	605	41.16%	349	23.74%	3	0.20%	2	0.14%	4	0.27%	-98	-6.67%	1,470
Franklin	709	31.15%	1,301	57.16%	237	10.41%	19	0.83%	7	0.31%	3	0.13%	-592	-26.01%	2,276
Garfield	875	65.25%	140	10.44%	324	24.16%	2	0.15%	0	0.00%	0	0.00%	551	41.09%	1,341
Grant	813	40.87%	823	41.38%	332	16.69%	16	0.80%	4	0.20%	1	0.05%	-10	-0.51%	1,989
Grays Harbor	8,273	60.16%	4,079	29.66%	1,239	9.01%	85	0.62%	32	0.23%	43	0.31%	4,194	30.50%	13,751
Island	832	46.25%	830	46.14%	114	6.34%	9	0.50%	6	0.33%	8	0.44%	2	0.11%	1,799
Jefferson	913	51.79%	692	39.25%	143	8.11%	4	0.23%	3	0.17%	8	0.45%	221	12.54%	1,763
King	60,438	53.51%	41,146	36.43%	7,404	6.56%	3,426	3.03%	309	0.27%	217	0.19%	19,292	17.08%	112,940
Kitsap	3,954	45.19%	4,215	48.17%	490	5.60%	45	0.51%	22	0.25%	24	0.27%	-261	-2.98%	8,750
Kittitas	2,360	47.22%	2,112	42.26%	455	9.10%	46	0.92%	9	0.18%	16	0.32%	248	4.96%	4,998
Klickitat	1,482	52.72%	790	28.10%	518	18.43%	9	0.32%	7	0.25%	5	0.18%	692	24.62%	2,811
Lewis	6,973	58.07%	3,392	28.25%	1,544	12.86%	30	0.25%	39	0.32%	29	0.24%	3,581	29.82%	12,007
Lincoln	2,042	46.16%	1,629	36.82%	743	16.79%	5	0.11%	3	0.07%	2	0.05%	413	9.34%	4,424
Mason	902	49.02%	741	40.27%	179	9.73%	9	0.49%	6	0.33%	3	0.16%	161	8.75%	1,840
Okanogan	2,531	50.41%	1,735	34.55%	721	14.36%	14	0.28%	14	0.28%	6	0.12%	796	15.86%	5,021
Pacific	2,672	64.57%	930	22.47%	501	12.11%	12	0.29%	8	0.19%	15	0.36%	1,742	42.10%	4,138
Pend Oreille	1,025	51.05%	749	37.30%	231	11.50%	2	0.10%	1	0.05%	0	0.00%	276	13.75%	2,008
Pierce	21,376	47.70%	18,467	41.20%	4,232	9.44%	498	1.11%	137	0.31%	108	0.24%	2,909	6.50%	44,818
San Juan	744	66.67%	284	25.45%	86	7.71%	1	0.09%	1	0.09%	0	0.00%	460	41.22%	1,116
Skagit	5,071	47.95%	4,714	44.57%	699	6.61%	33	0.31%	20	0.19%	39	0.37%	357	3.38%	10,576
Skamania	533	52.15%	275	26.91%	207	20.25%	1	0.10%	4	0.39%	2	0.20%	258	25.24%	1,022
Snohomish	10,484	48.82%	8,929	41.58%	1,548	7.21%	428	1.99%	53	0.25%	31	0.14%	1,555	7.24%	21,473
Spokane	23,403	49.30%	17,824	37.55%	6,036	12.71%	104	0.22%	71	0.15%	35	0.07%	5,579	11.75%	47,473
Stevens	2,909	48.94%	2,273	38.24%	685	11.52%	39	0.66%	9	0.15%	29	0.49%	636	10.70%	5,944
Thurston	5,125	57.77%	2,710	30.55%	943	10.63%	42	0.47%	25	0.28%	26	0.29%	2,415	27.22%	8,871
Wahkiakum	496	60.49%	228	27.80%	89	10.85%	1	0.12%	5	0.61%	1	0.12%	268	32.69%	820
Walla Walla	5,465	58.83%	2,125	22.87%	1,662	17.89%	28	0.30%	7	0.08%	3	0.03%	3,340	35.96%	9,290
Whatcom	9,214	57.19%	5,812	36.08%	927	5.75%	105	0.65%	39	0.24%	13	0.08%	3,402	21.11%	16,110
Whitman	4,960	52.12%	2,787	29.29%	1,745	18.34%	18	0.19%	4	0.04%	2	0.02%	2,173	22.83%	9,516
Yakima	12,124	63.72%	3,965	20.84%	2,157	11.34%	717	3.77%	35	0.18%	30	0.16%	8,159	42.88%	19,028
Totals	220,224	52.24%	150,727	35.76%	42,842	10.16%	5,991	1.42%	1,004	0.24%	761	0.18%	69,497	16.49%	421,549

==== Counties that flipped from Republican to Progressive ====
- Adams
- Ferry
- Franklin
- Grant
- Kitsap

== See also ==
- United States presidential elections in Washington (state)
