= 1924 United States presidential election in Pennsylvania =

- November 4, 1924

Nominee	Calvin Coolidge	John W. Davis	Robert M. La Follette
Party	Republican	Democratic	Labor/Socialist (Note: While Robert M. La Follette ran as a Progressive nationally, he was labeled in Pennsylvania under a fusion of 214,126 Labor and 93,441 Socialist parties.)
Alliance			Progressive
Home state	Massachusetts	West Virginia	Wisconsin
Running mate	Charles G. Dawes	Charles W. Bryan	Burton K. Wheeler
Electoral vote	38	0	0
Popular vote	1,401,481	409,192	307,567
Percentage	65.34%	19.08%	14.34%
County results
Coolidge
50–60%
60–70%
70–80%
80–90%
Davis
40–50%
50–60%
President before election
Calvin Coolidge
Republican
Elected President
Calvin Coolidge
Republican

The 1924 United States presidential election in Pennsylvania took place on November 4, 1924, as part of the 1924 United States presidential election. Voters chose 38 representatives, or electors to the Electoral College, who voted for president and vice president.

Pennsylvania overwhelmingly voted for the Republican nominee, President Calvin Coolidge, over the Democratic nominee, former United States Ambassador to the United Kingdom John W. Davis. Coolidge won Pennsylvania by a landslide margin of 46.26%.

Coolidge was credited for the booming economy while the Democratic electorate was divided between the conservative Davis and the Progressive candidate Robert M. La Follette, who ran under a fusion of Labor and Socialist in Pennsylvania. This was the first presidential election in which all American Indians were citizens and thus allowed to vote.

The 1920s were a fiercely Republican decade in American politics, and Pennsylvania in that era was a fiercely Republican state in presidential elections. The economic boom and social good feelings of the Roaring Twenties under popular Republican leadership virtually guaranteed Calvin Coolidge an easy win in the state against the conservative Southern Democrat John Davis, who had little appeal in Northern states like Pennsylvania.

With 65.34% of the popular vote, Pennsylvania would prove to be Coolidge's fourth strongest state in the 1924 election in terms of popular vote percentage after Vermont, Michigan and Maine.

== Results ==
1924 United States presidential election in Pennsylvania
Party	Candidate	Votes	Percentage	Electoral votes
Republican	Calvin Coolidge (incumbent)	1,401,481	65.34%	38
Democratic	John W. Davis	409,192	19.08%	0
Labor-Socialist	Robert M. La Follette	307,567	14.34%	0
American	Gilbert Nations	13,035	0.61%	0
Prohibition	Herman Faris	9,779	0.46%	0
Communist	William Z. Foster	2,735	0.13%	0
Socialist Labor	Frank Johns	634	0.03%	0
Commonwealth Land	William Wallace	296	0.01%	0
Write-ins	Write-ins	131	0.01%	0
Totals		2,144,850	100.00%	38

=== Results by county ===
County	Calvin Coolidge Republican		John W. Davis Democratic		Robert M. La Follette Labor/Socialist		Gilbert Nations American		Herman P. Faris Prohibition		Various candidates Other parties		Margin		Total votes cast
County	#	%	#	%	#	%	#	%	#	%	#	%	#	%	Total votes cast
Adams	5,778	52.92%	4,840	44.33%	273	2.50%	11	0.10%	14	0.13%	2	0.02%	938	8.59%	10,918
Allegheny	149,296	59.01%	21,984	8.69%	79,095	31.26%	1,059	0.42%	724	0.29%	855	0.34%	70,201 (Note: In this county where Davis ran third behind Coolidge and La Follette, margin given is Coolidge vote minus La Follette vote and percentage margin Coolidge percentage minus La Follette percentage.)	27.75%	253,013
Armstrong	11,192	64.18%	2,931	16.81%	2,228	12.78%	921	5.28%	131	0.75%	36	0.21%	8,261	47.37%	17,439
Beaver	16,768	64.14%	3,220	12.32%	5,599	21.42%	312	1.19%	165	0.63%	77	0.29%	11,169	42.73%	26,141
Bedford	6,154	61.72%	2,315	23.22%	931	9.34%	518	5.20%	39	0.39%	14	0.14%	3,839	38.50%	9,971
Berks	28,186	51.35%	17,220	31.37%	9,273	16.89%	57	0.10%	68	0.12%	89	0.16%	10,966	19.98%	54,893
Blair	20,313	65.93%	4,244	13.78%	6,027	19.56%	67	0.22%	115	0.37%	42	0.14%	14,286	46.37%	30,808
Bradford	11,620	73.62%	2,307	14.62%	1,718	10.88%	25	0.16%	111	0.70%	3	0.02%	9,313	59.00%	15,784
Bucks	17,460	66.88%	6,582	25.21%	1,941	7.43%	21	0.08%	74	0.28%	30	0.11%	10,878	41.67%	26,108
Butler	13,113	69.45%	3,462	18.34%	1,932	10.23%	202	1.07%	161	0.85%	10	0.05%	9,651	51.12%	18,880
Cambria	24,728	51.77%	13,563	28.40%	9,167	19.19%	104	0.22%	94	0.20%	108	0.23%	11,165	23.38%	47,764
Cameron	1,366	77.18%	260	14.69%	133	7.51%	2	0.11%	8	0.45%	1	0.06%	1,106	62.49%	1,770
Carbon	10,236	55.55%	5,150	27.95%	2,975	16.14%	14	0.08%	27	0.15%	25	0.14%	5,086	27.60%	18,427
Centre	7,723	59.13%	4,443	34.01%	673	5.15%	92	0.70%	122	0.93%	9	0.07%	3,280	25.11%	13,062
Chester	22,333	75.76%	5,946	20.17%	1,013	3.44%	78	0.26%	100	0.34%	10	0.03%	16,387	55.59%	29,480
Clarion	5,913	55.27%	3,642	34.04%	897	8.38%	139	1.30%	100	0.93%	7	0.07%	2,271	21.23%	10,698
Clearfield	13,745	60.32%	5,027	22.06%	3,383	14.85%	338	1.48%	247	1.08%	47	0.21%	8,718	38.26%	22,787
Clinton	5,129	54.62%	1,939	20.65%	1,624	17.29%	628	6.69%	66	0.70%	5	0.05%	3,190	33.97%	9,391
Columbia	7,336	47.42%	7,390	47.77%	526	3.40%	63	0.41%	133	0.86%	21	0.14%	-54	-0.35%	15,469
Crawford	10,918	63.09%	2,969	17.16%	2,987	17.26%	67	0.39%	348	2.01%	16	0.09%	7,931	45.83%	17,305
Cumberland	10,196	53.22%	7,643	39.89%	1,132	5.91%	44	0.23%	138	0.72%	7	0.04%	2,553	13.32%	19,160
Dauphin	27,838	68.04%	9,004	22.01%	3,756	9.18%	43	0.11%	245	0.60%	30	0.07%	18,834	46.03%	40,916
Delaware	41,998	81.80%	6,368	12.40%	2,750	5.36%	52	0.10%	130	0.25%	47	0.09%	35,630	69.39%	51,345
Elk	6,626	70.85%	1,370	14.65%	1,175	12.56%	20	0.21%	134	1.43%	27	0.29%	5,256	56.20%	9,352
Erie	19,480	61.29%	3,502	11.02%	8,267	26.01%	69	0.22%	390	1.23%	76	0.24%	11,213	35.28%	31,784
Fayette	19,064	53.57%	8,855	24.88%	6,103	17.15%	1,264	3.55%	210	0.59%	91	0.26%	10,209	28.69%	35,587
Forest	1,130	71.20%	280	17.64%	95	5.99%	6	0.38%	76	4.79%	0	0.00%	850	53.56%	1,587
Franklin	9,791	58.82%	5,770	34.67%	1,010	6.07%	2	0.01%	67	0.40%	5	0.03%	4,021	24.16%	16,645
Fulton	1,160	47.64%	1,207	49.57%	42	1.72%	26	1.07%	0	0.00%	0	0.00%	-47	-1.93%	2,435
Greene	4,590	41.82%	5,874	53.52%	378	3.44%	95	0.87%	30	0.27%	9	0.08%	-1,284	-11.70%	10,976
Huntingdon	6,567	73.99%	1,488	16.77%	750	8.45%	29	0.33%	35	0.39%	6	0.07%	5,079	57.23%	8,875
Indiana	12,748	69.75%	2,067	11.31%	2,648	14.49%	325	1.78%	459	2.51%	30	0.16%	10,100	55.26%	18,277
Jefferson	10,673	64.88%	2,664	16.19%	2,618	15.91%	338	2.05%	144	0.88%	13	0.08%	8,009	48.69%	16,450
Juniata	2,177	57.41%	1,420	37.45%	177	4.67%	1	0.03%	17	0.45%	0	0.00%	757	19.96%	3,792
Lackawanna	37,708	60.43%	16,859	27.02%	7,533	12.07%	12	0.02%	184	0.29%	105	0.17%	20,849	33.41%	62,401
Lancaster	42,787	73.73%	12,091	20.83%	2,871	4.95%	35	0.06%	200	0.34%	50	0.09%	30,696	52.89%	58,034
Lawrence	12,533	64.58%	1,880	9.69%	4,211	21.70%	465	2.40%	274	1.41%	43	0.22%	8,322	42.88%	19,406
Lebanon	9,494	74.27%	2,464	19.28%	756	5.91%	19	0.15%	45	0.35%	5	0.04%	7,030	54.99%	12,783
Lehigh	20,826	59.02%	10,415	29.52%	3,879	10.99%	60	0.17%	65	0.18%	39	0.11%	10,411	29.51%	35,284
Luzerne	46,475	53.18%	20,472	23.42%	20,093	22.99%	61	0.07%	171	0.20%	124	0.14%	26,003	29.75%	87,396
Lycoming	14,039	58.70%	6,857	28.67%	2,432	10.17%	172	0.72%	408	1.71%	8	0.03%	7,182	30.03%	23,916
McKean	9,072	68.99%	2,376	18.07%	1,373	10.44%	50	0.38%	271	2.06%	7	0.05%	6,696	50.92%	13,149
Mercer	14,639	65.29%	3,688	16.45%	3,580	15.97%	135	0.60%	339	1.51%	39	0.17%	10,951	48.84%	22,420
Mifflin	4,780	66.92%	1,999	27.99%	322	4.51%	13	0.18%	27	0.38%	2	0.03%	2,781	38.93%	7,143
Monroe	3,462	44.28%	3,901	49.89%	426	5.45%	4	0.05%	21	0.27%	5	0.06%	-439	-5.61%	7,819
Montgomery	45,407	75.48%	11,094	18.44%	3,450	5.74%	54	0.09%	113	0.19%	36	0.06%	34,313	57.04%	60,154
Montour	2,499	55.83%	1,799	40.19%	148	3.31%	12	0.27%	16	0.36%	2	0.04%	700	15.64%	4,476
Northampton	20,459	58.42%	11,459	32.72%	2,882	8.23%	55	0.16%	93	0.27%	74	0.21%	9,000	25.70%	35,022
Northumberland	17,516	56.18%	7,571	24.28%	5,902	18.93%	77	0.25%	84	0.27%	27	0.09%	9,945	31.90%	31,177
Perry	4,185	57.52%	2,710	37.25%	333	4.58%	17	0.23%	28	0.38%	3	0.04%	1,475	20.27%	7,276
Philadelphia	347,457	77.73%	54,213	12.13%	44,230	9.89%	142	0.03%	364	0.08%	616	0.14%	293,244	65.60%	447,022
Pike	1,581	54.20%	993	34.04%	329	11.28%	7	0.24%	5	0.17%	2	0.07%	588	20.16%	2,917
Potter	4,087	65.49%	1,161	18.60%	925	14.82%	16	0.26%	42	0.67%	10	0.16%	2,926	46.88%	6,241
Schuylkill	34,578	64.44%	10,111	18.84%	8,533	15.90%	170	0.32%	83	0.15%	181	0.34%	24,467	45.60%	53,656
Snyder	3,055	72.00%	970	22.86%	210	4.95%	2	0.05%	4	0.09%	2	0.05%	2,085	49.14%	4,243
Somerset	12,389	72.74%	2,315	13.59%	1,974	11.59%	204	1.20%	117	0.69%	33	0.19%	10,074	59.15%	17,032
Sullivan	1,668	59.76%	913	32.71%	155	5.55%	7	0.25%	47	1.68%	1	0.04%	755	27.05%	2,791
Susquehanna	7,266	67.38%	2,208	20.47%	1,223	11.34%	3	0.03%	71	0.66%	13	0.12%	5,058	46.90%	10,784
Tioga	8,452	81.22%	1,271	12.21%	541	5.20%	16	0.15%	121	1.16%	5	0.05%	7,181	69.01%	10,406
Union	3,707	71.59%	1,209	23.35%	236	4.56%	6	0.12%	20	0.39%	0	0.00%	2,498	48.24%	5,178
Venango	10,841	74.29%	1,886	12.92%	1,496	10.25%	131	0.90%	232	1.59%	6	0.04%	8,955	61.37%	14,592
Warren	8,502	70.93%	2,161	18.03%	841	7.02%	40	0.33%	422	3.52%	20	0.17%	6,341	52.90%	11,986
Washington	22,315	60.64%	6,706	18.22%	7,089	19.27%	309	0.84%	151	0.41%	227	0.62%	15,226	41.38%	36,797
Wayne	5,578	72.87%	1,477	19.29%	513	6.70%	16	0.21%	64	0.84%	7	0.09%	4,101	53.57%	7,655
Westmoreland	34,522	55.22%	10,223	16.35%	13,403	21.44%	3,617	5.79%	538	0.86%	211	0.34%	21,119	33.78%	62,514
Wyoming	3,213	68.06%	1,194	25.29%	236	5.00%	2	0.04%	71	1.50%	5	0.11%	2,019	42.77%	4,721
York	23,044	56.15%	15,600	38.01%	2,146	5.23%	74	0.18%	166	0.40%	9	0.02%	7,444	18.14%	41,039
Totals	1,401,481	65.34%	409,192	19.08%	307,567	14.34%	13,035	0.61%	9,779	0.46%	3,796	0.18%	992,289	46.26%	2,144,850

==== Counties that flipped from Republican to Democratic ====
- Fulton

== See also ==
- United States presidential elections in Pennsylvania
