= 1924 United States presidential election in Kentucky =

- November 4, 1924

Nominee	Calvin Coolidge	John W. Davis
Party	Republican	Democratic
Home state	Massachusetts	West Virginia
Running mate	Charles G. Dawes	Charles W. Bryan
Electoral vote	13	0
Popular vote	398,966	374,855
Percentage	48.93%	45.98%
County results
Coolidge
40–50%
50–60%
60–70%
70–80%
80–90%
Davis
40–50%
50–60%
60–70%
70–80%
80–90%
Tie
<50%
President before election
Calvin Coolidge
Republican
Elected President
Calvin Coolidge
Republican

The 1924 United States presidential election in Kentucky took place on November 4, 1924, as part of the 1924 United States presidential election. Voters chose thirteen representatives, or electors to the Electoral College, who voted for president and vice president.

Ever since the Civil War, Kentucky had been shaped politically by divisions created by that war between secessionist, Democratic counties and Unionist, Republican ones, although the state as a whole leaned Democratic throughout this era and the GOP had carried the state only once – in 1896 – between 1856 and 1920.

However, largely owing to loss of support for the Democratic Party in historically secessionist Northern Kentucky, and to a general decline in Democratic support from the high levels seen in 1920, due to female mobilization after the Nineteenth Amendment, Calvin Coolidge narrowly won Kentucky by 2.95 points against John W. Davis, winning all 13 electoral votes from the state. Kentucky is the only state that Warren G. Harding lost in the 1920 presidential election, but Coolidge won in the 1924 presidential election.

== Results ==
1924 United States presidential election in Kentucky
Party	Candidate	Votes	%
Republican	Calvin Coolidge (incumbent)	398,966	48.93%
Democratic	John W. Davis	374,855	45.98%
Progressive	Robert M. La Follette	38,465	4.72%
Socialist Labor	Frank Tetes Johns	1,499	0.18%
American	Gilbert Nations	1,299	0.16%
Commonwealth Land	William Wallace	248	0.03%
Total votes		812,286	100%

=== Results by county ===
1924 United States presidential election in Kentucky
County	John Calvin Coolidge Republican		John William Davis Democratic		Robert Marion La Follette Sr. Progressive		Various candidates Other parties		Margin		Total votes cast
County	#	%	#	%	#	%	#	%	#	%	Total votes cast
Adair	2,757	53.40%	2,368	45.86%	30	0.58%	8	0.15%	389	7.53%	5,163
Allen	3,132	56.52%	2,373	42.83%	27	0.49%	9	0.16%	759	13.70%	5,541
Anderson	1,419	39.84%	2,089	58.65%	30	0.84%	24	0.67%	-670	-18.81%	3,562
Ballard	767	19.18%	3,128	78.22%	81	2.03%	23	0.58%	-2,361	-59.04%	3,999
Barren	3,488	43.48%	4,449	55.46%	73	0.91%	12	0.15%	-961	-11.98%	8,022
Bath	1,723	44.90%	2,093	54.55%	20	0.52%	1	0.03%	-370	-9.64%	3,837
Bell	5,371	68.02%	2,166	27.43%	333	4.22%	26	0.33%	3,205	40.59%	7,896
Boone	1,340	36.39%	2,204	59.86%	127	3.45%	11	0.30%	-864	-23.47%	3,682
Bourbon	3,691	47.06%	4,034	51.43%	93	1.19%	25	0.32%	-343	-4.37%	7,843
Boyd	6,062	55.55%	4,079	37.38%	660	6.05%	112	1.03%	1,983	18.17%	10,913
Boyle	2,673	43.00%	3,197	51.42%	293	4.71%	54	0.87%	-524	-8.43%	6,217
Bracken	1,779	51.67%	1,485	43.13%	125	3.63%	54	1.57%	294	8.54%	3,443
Breathitt	1,708	37.59%	2,826	62.19%	10	0.22%	0	0.00%	-1,118	-24.60%	4,544
Breckinridge	3,832	53.37%	3,230	44.99%	104	1.45%	14	0.19%	602	8.38%	7,180
Bullitt	946	33.04%	1,789	62.49%	125	4.37%	3	0.10%	-843	-29.44%	2,863
Butler	2,644	68.18%	1,177	30.35%	32	0.83%	25	0.64%	1,467	37.83%	3,878
Caldwell	2,498	51.45%	2,183	44.96%	148	3.05%	26	0.54%	315	6.49%	4,855
Calloway	936	19.17%	3,790	77.63%	130	2.66%	26	0.53%	-2,854	-58.46%	4,882
Campbell	12,329	49.44%	5,564	22.31%	6,882	27.60%	161	0.65%	5,447 (Note: In this county where La Follette ran second ahead of Davis, margin given is Coolidge vote minus La Follette vote and percentage margin Coolidge percentage minus La Follette percentage.)	21.84%	24,936
Carlisle	467	16.93%	2,250	81.58%	29	1.05%	12	0.44%	-1,783	-64.65%	2,758
Carroll	1,306	36.59%	2,243	62.85%	18	0.50%	2	0.06%	-937	-26.25%	3,569
Carter	4,472	61.50%	2,552	35.10%	231	3.18%	16	0.22%	1,920	26.41%	7,271
Casey	3,120	63.03%	1,797	36.30%	31	0.63%	2	0.04%	1,323	26.73%	4,950
Christian	7,192	51.77%	6,585	47.40%	101	0.73%	14	0.10%	607	4.37%	13,892
Clark	2,703	40.78%	3,857	58.18%	44	0.66%	25	0.38%	-1,154	-17.41%	6,629
Clay	3,613	74.08%	1,144	23.46%	108	2.21%	12	0.25%	2,469	50.63%	4,877
Clinton	2,069	78.70%	543	20.65%	11	0.42%	6	0.23%	1,526	58.04%	2,629
Crittenden	2,539	56.75%	1,869	41.77%	54	1.21%	12	0.27%	670	14.98%	4,474
Cumberland	2,143	69.60%	918	29.81%	18	0.58%	0	0.00%	1,225	39.79%	3,079
Daviess	7,270	46.67%	8,116	52.10%	161	1.03%	31	0.20%	-846	-5.43%	15,578
Edmonson	2,062	63.54%	1,183	36.46%	0	0.00%	0	0.00%	879	27.09%	3,245
Elliott	614	26.16%	1,702	72.52%	26	1.11%	5	0.21%	-1,088	-46.36%	2,347
Estill	2,152	48.64%	2,052	46.38%	195	4.41%	25	0.57%	100	2.26%	4,424
Fayette	11,755	52.20%	10,433	46.33%	245	1.09%	86	0.38%	1,322	5.87%	22,519
Fleming	2,572	49.38%	2,590	49.72%	30	0.58%	17	0.33%	-18	-0.35%	5,209
Floyd	3,773	44.02%	4,220	49.23%	562	6.56%	17	0.20%	-447	-5.21%	8,572
Franklin	2,826	37.15%	4,678	61.50%	59	0.78%	43	0.57%	-1,852	-24.35%	7,606
Fulton	902	20.96%	3,336	77.53%	56	1.30%	9	0.21%	-2,434	-56.57%	4,303
Gallatin	750	42.13%	1,007	56.57%	22	1.24%	1	0.06%	-257	-14.44%	1,780
Garrard	2,592	54.63%	2,126	44.81%	26	0.55%	1	0.02%	466	9.82%	4,745
Grant	1,404	39.45%	1,923	54.03%	208	5.84%	24	0.67%	-519	-14.58%	3,559
Graves	2,279	23.22%	7,266	74.04%	247	2.52%	21	0.21%	-4,987	-50.82%	9,813
Grayson	3,183	52.16%	2,858	46.84%	56	0.92%	5	0.08%	325	5.33%	6,102
Green	1,920	55.16%	1,548	44.47%	8	0.23%	5	0.14%	372	10.69%	3,481
Greenup	2,510	47.30%	1,932	36.41%	813	15.32%	51	0.96%	578	10.89%	5,306
Hancock	1,332	48.88%	1,323	48.55%	59	2.17%	11	0.40%	9	0.33%	2,725
Hardin	2,735	38.00%	4,296	59.68%	152	2.11%	15	0.21%	-1,561	-21.69%	7,198
Harlan	9,634	72.94%	2,133	16.15%	1,263	9.56%	178	1.35%	7,501	56.79%	13,208
Harrison	2,165	34.98%	3,924	63.40%	87	1.41%	13	0.21%	-1,759	-28.42%	6,189
Hart	2,736	48.08%	2,862	50.29%	83	1.46%	10	0.18%	-126	-2.21%	5,691
Henderson	4,902	53.67%	4,046	44.30%	186	2.04%	0	0.00%	856	9.37%	9,134
Henry	1,918	33.86%	3,706	65.43%	30	0.53%	10	0.18%	-1,788	-31.57%	5,664
Hickman	618	21.27%	2,270	78.14%	13	0.45%	4	0.14%	-1,652	-56.87%	2,905
Hopkins	5,292	44.64%	5,864	49.47%	604	5.10%	94	0.79%	-572	-4.83%	11,854
Jackson	2,629	87.96%	284	9.50%	75	2.51%	1	0.03%	2,345	78.45%	2,989
Jefferson	61,768	52.53%	50,409	42.87%	5,032	4.28%	377	0.32%	11,359	9.66%	117,586
Jessamine	2,144	45.00%	2,470	51.85%	25	0.52%	125	2.62%	-326	-6.84%	4,764
Johnson	3,078	61.67%	1,480	29.65%	408	8.17%	25	0.50%	1,598	32.02%	4,991
Kenton	13,537	44.33%	7,948	26.03%	8,897	29.13%	157	0.51%	4,640	15.19%	30,539
Knott	886	27.75%	2,286	71.59%	16	0.50%	5	0.16%	-1,400	-43.85%	3,193
Knox	3,767	67.34%	1,537	27.48%	290	5.18%	0	0.00%	2,230	39.86%	5,594
Larue	1,372	40.42%	1,993	58.72%	25	0.74%	4	0.12%	-621	-18.30%	3,394
Laurel	3,274	66.24%	1,451	29.35%	202	4.09%	16	0.32%	1,823	36.88%	4,943
Lawrence	2,547	50.16%	2,445	48.15%	73	1.44%	13	0.26%	102	2.01%	5,078
Lee	1,348	49.25%	1,348	49.25%	29	1.06%	12	0.44%	0	0.00%	2,737
Leslie	2,052	88.91%	223	9.66%	17	0.74%	16	0.69%	1,829	79.25%	2,308
Letcher	3,172	54.96%	1,912	33.13%	650	11.26%	37	0.64%	1,260	21.83%	5,771
Lewis	3,067	65.13%	1,447	30.73%	172	3.65%	23	0.49%	1,620	34.40%	4,709
Lincoln	2,935	46.67%	3,100	49.29%	240	3.82%	14	0.22%	-165	-2.62%	6,289
Livingston	1,267	40.84%	1,768	57.00%	60	1.93%	7	0.23%	-501	-16.15%	3,102
Logan	3,705	42.80%	4,772	55.13%	108	1.25%	71	0.82%	-1,067	-12.33%	8,656
Lyon	993	36.33%	1,696	62.06%	38	1.39%	6	0.22%	-703	-25.72%	2,733
Madison	5,276	51.26%	4,895	47.56%	90	0.87%	31	0.30%	381	3.70%	10,292
Magoffin	2,196	55.25%	1,757	44.20%	21	0.53%	1	0.03%	439	11.04%	3,975
Marion	1,975	38.53%	3,055	59.60%	94	1.83%	2	0.04%	-1,080	-21.07%	5,126
Marshall	1,192	29.73%	2,752	68.63%	59	1.47%	7	0.17%	-1,560	-38.90%	4,010
Martin	1,512	72.94%	364	17.56%	186	8.97%	11	0.53%	1,148	55.38%	2,073
Mason	3,406	48.28%	3,525	49.96%	108	1.53%	16	0.23%	-119	-1.69%	7,055
McCracken	4,979	40.54%	6,028	49.08%	1,218	9.92%	56	0.46%	-1,049	-8.54%	12,281
McCreary	2,317	74.98%	533	17.25%	234	7.57%	6	0.19%	1,784	57.73%	3,090
McLean	1,857	43.61%	2,284	53.64%	94	2.21%	23	0.54%	-427	-10.03%	4,258
Meade	1,106	37.43%	1,802	60.98%	44	1.49%	3	0.10%	-696	-23.55%	2,955
Menifee	450	33.48%	873	64.96%	7	0.52%	14	1.04%	-423	-31.47%	1,344
Mercer	2,715	49.62%	2,698	49.31%	33	0.60%	26	0.48%	17	0.31%	5,472
Metcalfe	1,450	53.15%	1,262	46.26%	15	0.55%	1	0.04%	188	6.89%	2,728
Monroe	2,489	71.18%	970	27.74%	34	0.97%	4	0.11%	1,519	43.44%	3,497
Montgomery	1,956	44.92%	2,347	53.90%	27	0.62%	24	0.55%	-391	-8.98%	4,354
Morgan	1,805	35.09%	3,311	64.37%	28	0.54%	0	0.00%	-1,506	-29.28%	5,144
Muhlenberg	5,210	49.76%	4,379	41.82%	841	8.03%	41	0.39%	831	7.94%	10,471
Nelson	2,082	34.56%	3,863	64.13%	76	1.26%	3	0.05%	-1,781	-29.57%	6,024
Nicholas	1,348	37.19%	2,235	61.66%	35	0.97%	7	0.19%	-887	-24.47%	3,625
Ohio	4,267	50.65%	3,817	45.31%	294	3.49%	47	0.56%	450	5.34%	8,425
Oldham	906	31.30%	1,954	67.50%	35	1.21%	0	0.00%	-1,048	-36.20%	2,895
Owen	913	22.24%	3,155	76.84%	36	0.88%	2	0.05%	-2,242	-54.60%	4,106
Owsley	1,434	80.38%	323	18.11%	23	1.29%	4	0.22%	1,111	62.28%	1,784
Pendleton	2,148	49.71%	2,028	46.93%	141	3.26%	4	0.09%	120	2.78%	4,321
Perry	4,357	59.09%	2,658	36.05%	342	4.64%	17	0.23%	1,699	23.04%	7,374
Pike	7,059	52.13%	5,835	43.09%	574	4.24%	72	0.53%	1,224	9.04%	13,540
Powell	724	42.87%	939	55.60%	25	1.48%	1	0.06%	-215	-12.73%	1,689
Pulaski	6,435	62.66%	3,158	30.75%	655	6.38%	21	0.20%	3,277	31.91%	10,269
Robertson	498	41.85%	680	57.14%	9	0.76%	3	0.25%	-182	-15.29%	1,190
Rockcastle	2,712	66.24%	1,277	31.19%	105	2.56%	0	0.00%	1,435	35.05%	4,094
Rowan	1,326	53.60%	1,092	44.14%	53	2.14%	3	0.12%	234	9.46%	2,474
Russell	2,278	64.61%	1,224	34.71%	24	0.68%	0	0.00%	1,054	29.89%	3,526
Scott	2,334	37.60%	3,805	61.30%	38	0.61%	30	0.48%	-1,471	-23.70%	6,207
Shelby	2,966	41.60%	4,092	57.39%	46	0.65%	26	0.36%	-1,126	-15.79%	7,130
Simpson	1,294	32.08%	2,688	66.63%	48	1.19%	4	0.10%	-1,394	-34.56%	4,034
Spencer	961	41.95%	1,320	57.62%	10	0.44%	0	0.00%	-359	-15.67%	2,291
Taylor	2,267	52.09%	2,052	47.15%	19	0.44%	14	0.32%	215	4.94%	4,352
Todd	1,942	41.50%	2,679	57.24%	57	1.22%	2	0.04%	-737	-15.75%	4,680
Trigg	2,130	44.36%	2,625	54.66%	32	0.67%	15	0.31%	-495	-10.31%	4,802
Trimble	335	16.61%	1,676	83.09%	2	0.10%	4	0.20%	-1,341	-66.48%	2,017
Union	1,778	32.05%	3,493	62.97%	242	4.36%	34	0.61%	-1,715	-30.92%	5,547
Warren	5,634	44.12%	7,005	54.85%	106	0.83%	26	0.20%	-1,371	-10.74%	12,771
Washington	2,286	50.39%	2,238	49.33%	10	0.22%	3	0.07%	48	1.06%	4,537
Wayne	2,436	54.31%	2,020	45.04%	25	0.56%	4	0.09%	416	9.28%	4,485
Webster	3,131	47.08%	3,449	51.86%	0	0.00%	71	1.07%	-318	-4.78%	6,651
Whitley	4,716	68.38%	1,413	20.49%	730	10.58%	38	0.55%	3,303	47.89%	6,897
Wolfe	821	33.72%	1,597	65.59%	17	0.70%	0	0.00%	-776	-31.87%	2,435
Woodford	2,091	45.69%	2,472	54.02%	7	0.15%	6	0.13%	-381	-8.33%	4,576
Totals	398,966	48.93%	374,855	45.98%	38,465	4.72%	3,046	0.37%	24,111	2.96%	815,332

== See also ==
- United States presidential elections in Kentucky
