= 1924 United States presidential election in New Jersey =

- November 4, 1924
- Turnout: 83.14% ▲

Nominee	Calvin Coolidge	John W. Davis	Robert M. La Follette
Party	Republican	Democratic	Progressive
Home state	Massachusetts	West Virginia	Wisconsin
Running mate	Charles G. Dawes	Charles W. Bryan	Burton K. Wheeler
Electoral vote	14	0	0
Popular vote	675,162	297,743	108,901
Percentage	62.17%	27.41%	10.03%
County results
Coolidge
50–60%
60–70%
70–80%
Davis
40–50%
President before election
Calvin Coolidge
Republican
Elected President
Calvin Coolidge
Republican

The 1924 United States presidential election in New Jersey took place on November 4, 1924. All contemporary 48 states were part of the 1924 United States presidential election. Voters chose 14 electors to the Electoral College, which selected the president and vice president.

New Jersey was won in a landslide by the Republican nominees, incumbent President Calvin Coolidge of Massachusetts and his running mate Budget Director Charles G. Dawes of Illinois. Coolidge and Dawes defeated the Democratic nominees, Ambassador John W. Davis of West Virginia and his running mate Governor Charles W. Bryan of Nebraska. Also in the running was the Progressive Party nominee, Senator Robert M. La Follette of Wisconsin and his running mate Senator Burton K. Wheeler of Montana.

Coolidge carried New Jersey overwhelmingly with 62.17% of the vote to Davis’ 27.41%, a victory margin of 34.75%. La Follette finished in a relatively strong third, with 10.03%.

New Jersey in this era was a staunchly Republican state, having not given a majority of the vote to a Democratic presidential candidate since 1892. As the Northeastern Republican Calvin Coolidge was winning a second consecutive Republican landslide nationally, amidst the economic boom and social good feelings of the Roaring Twenties under popular Republican leadership, New Jersey easily remained in the Republican column, with Southern Democrat John Davis having little appeal in the state. Coolidge won a commanding majority statewide even with the Republican vote being split by the strong third party candidacy of Robert La Follette, a Republican Senator who had run as the Progressive Party candidate and peeled away the votes of many progressive Republicans. On the county level map, reflecting the decisiveness of his victory, Coolidge won twenty of the state's 21 counties. Coolidge broke 60% of the vote in all but two counties and 70% of the vote in seven.

The Progressive La Follette, a former Republican Senator who ran to the left of both Coolidge and Davis and appealed most strongly to progressive Republicans, performed most strongly in urban parts of North Jersey. La Follette's double-digit support in urban Hudson County allowed Davis to eke out a narrow plurality there with less than 50% of the vote, after the county had given a majority of the vote to Republican Warren G. Harding in 1920. Davis narrowly won Hudson County even as every other county in the state, and the state as a whole, voted overwhelmingly Republican. While La Follette hurt Coolidge's vote share in urban parts of the state, Coolidge did make gains over Harding in some rural parts of the state, in both South Jersey and North Jersey. Whereas Harding had failed to crack 60% of the vote in 4 counties, Coolidge only failed to crack 60% in 2.

Even in the midst of a nationwide Republican landslide, New Jersey's presidential election returns made the state about 10% points more Republican than the nation as a whole, reflecting the state's strong Republican roots in that era, and would ultimately mark the end of that era. Beginning in 1928, the state would begin trending Democratic when the Democratic Party nominated Al Smith, a New York City native and Roman Catholic of Irish, Italian and German immigrant heritage who appealed greatly to urban New Jersey voters, and beginning in 1932, the state would vote Democratic in all four of Democrat Franklin Roosevelt’s elections with the rise of the New Deal Coalition in the state.

== Results ==
1924 United States presidential election in New Jersey
Party	Candidate	Votes	Percentage	Electoral votes
Republican	Calvin Coolidge (incumbent)	675,162	62.17%	14
Democratic	John W. Davis	297,743	27.41%	0
Progressive	Robert M. La Follette	108,901	10.03%	0
Communist	William Z. Foster	1,540	0.14%	0
National Prohibition	Herman P. Faris	1,337	0.12%	0
Socialist Labor	Frank T. Johns	819	0.08%	0
American	Gilbert Nations	358	0.03%	0
Commonwealth Land	William Wallace	219	0.02%	0
Totals		1,086,079	100.0%	14

=== Results by county ===
County	Calvin Coolidge Republican		John W. Davis Democratic		Robert M. La Follette Progressive		Various candidates Other parties		Margin		Total votes cast
County	#	%	#	%	#	%	#	%	#	%	Total votes cast
Atlantic	27,936	73.63%	6,937	18.28%	2,885	7.60%	181	0.48%	20,999	55.35%	37,939
Bergen	60,803	69.41%	16,844	19.23%	9,646	11.01%	305	0.35%	43,959	50.18%	87,598
Burlington	21,617	70.23%	7,794	25.32%	1,288	4.18%	81	0.26%	13,823	44.91%	30,780
Camden	48,154	66.31%	17,577	24.20%	6,556	9.03%	335	0.46%	30,577	42.10%	72,622
Cape May	8,139	72.37%	2,611	23.22%	458	4.07%	38	0.34%	5,528	49.16%	11,246
Cumberland	15,691	71.05%	4,780	21.64%	1,371	6.21%	242	1.10%	10,911	49.41%	22,084
Essex	123,614	66.22%	41,708	22.34%	20,877	11.18%	474	0.25%	81,906	43.88%	186,673
Gloucester	15,513	72.74%	4,167	19.54%	1,314	6.16%	334	1.57%	11,346	53.20%	21,328
Hudson	80,892	41.71%	91,094	46.97%	21,560	11.12%	406	0.21%	-10,202	-5.26%	193,952
Hunterdon	8,940	60.62%	5,103	34.60%	647	4.39%	57	0.39%	3,837	26.02%	14,747
Mercer	30,689	59.53%	14,639	28.40%	6,067	11.77%	156	0.30%	16,050	31.13%	51,551
Middlesex	34,556	62.28%	16,373	29.51%	4,371	7.88%	182	0.33%	18,183	32.77%	55,482
Monmouth	34,451	65.64%	14,931	28.45%	2,902	5.53%	198	0.38%	19,520	37.19%	52,482
Morris	24,812	69.59%	8,042	22.56%	2,685	7.53%	116	0.33%	16,770	47.03%	35,655
Ocean	8,677	70.99%	2,594	21.22%	918	7.51%	33	0.27%	6,083	49.77%	12,222
Passaic	43,384	62.33%	11,644	16.73%	14,082	20.23%	489	0.70%	29,302 (Note: In this county where La Follette ran second ahead of Davis, margin given is Coolidge vote minus La Follette vote and percentage margin Coolidge percentage minus La Follette percentage.)	42.10%	69,599
Salem	8,027	68.86%	3,206	27.50%	357	3.06%	67	0.57%	4,821	41.36%	11,657
Somerset	12,986	71.12%	4,143	22.69%	1,069	5.85%	62	0.34%	8,843	48.43%	18,260
Sussex	6,319	61.36%	3,632	35.27%	302	2.93%	45	0.44%	2,687	26.09%	10,298
Union	50,356	67.99%	14,738	19.90%	8,576	11.58%	390	0.53%	35,618	48.09%	74,060
Warren	9,606	60.63%	5,186	32.73%	970	6.12%	82	0.52%	4,420	27.90%	15,844
Totals	675,162	62.17%	297,743	27.41%	108,901	10.03%	4,273	0.39%	377,419	34.75%	1,086,079

== See also ==
- Presidency of Calvin Coolidge
- United States presidential elections in New Jersey
