= Edward the King =

Edward the King may refer to:

- Edward the King (play), a play by David Brendan Hopes
- Edward the Seventh, also known as Edward the King, a 1975 television drama series
