= 1924 United States presidential election in West Virginia =

- November 4, 1924

Nominee	Calvin Coolidge	John W. Davis	Robert M. La Follette
Party	Republican	Democratic	Farmer–Labor (Note: Although La Follette ran under his own Progressive Party nationally, he ran in West Virginia under a fusion of the Socialist Party of America and the Farmer–Labor Party.)
Alliance			Socialist
Home state	Massachusetts	West Virginia	Wisconsin
Running mate	Charles G. Dawes	Charles W. Bryan	Burton K. Wheeler
Electoral vote	8	0	0
Popular vote	288,635	257,232	36,723
Percentage	49.45%	44.07%	6.29%
County results
Coolidge
40–50%
50–60%
60–70%
70–80%
Davis
40–50%
50–60%
60–70%
70–80%
President before election
Calvin Coolidge
Republican
Elected President
Calvin Coolidge
Republican

The 1924 United States presidential election in West Virginia took place on November 4, 1924, as part of the 1924 United States presidential election which was held throughout all contemporary 48 states. Voters chose eight representatives, or electors to the Electoral College, who voted for president and vice president.

West Virginia voted for the Republican nominee, incumbent President Calvin Coolidge of Massachusetts, over the Democratic nominee and West Virginia native, Ambassador John W. Davis. Coolidge ran with former Budget Director Charles G. Dawes of Illinois, while Davis ran with Governor Charles W. Bryan of Nebraska. Also in the running that year was the Progressive Party nominee, Senator Robert M. La Follette of Wisconsin and his running mate Senator Burton K. Wheeler of Montana, which the ticket ran under a fusion of both the Socialist Party of America and the Farmer–Labor Party in the state.

Coolidge won the state by a margin of 5.38 percent. Until 2008, this was the last time West Virginia voted Republican while Virginia voted Democratic.

As of 2025, this is the last time that Wayne County voted for a candidate that lost the state as a whole.

== Results ==
1924 United States presidential election in West Virginia
Party	Candidate	Votes	Percentage	Electoral votes
Republican	Calvin Coolidge (incumbent)	288,635	49.45%	8
Democratic	John W. Davis	257,232	44.07%	0
Farmer-Labor Party	Robert M. La Follette	36,723	6.29%	0
American	Gilbert Nations	1,072	0.18%	0
Totals		583,662	100.00%	8

=== Results by county ===
1924 United States presidential election in West Virginia by county
County	Calvin Coolidge Republican		John W. Davis Democratic		Robert M. La Follette Farmer–Labor		Gilbert O. Nations American		Margin		Total votes cast
County	#	%	#	%	#	%	#	%	#	%	Total votes cast
Barbour	3,347	45.41%	3,188	43.25%	830	11.26%	6	0.08%	159	2.16%	7,371
Berkeley	5,427	53.18%	4,366	42.78%	410	4.02%	2	0.02%	1,061	10.40%	10,205
Boone	3,010	41.32%	3,326	45.66%	939	12.89%	9	0.12%	-316	-4.34%	7,284
Braxton	4,192	44.17%	5,168	54.46%	117	1.23%	13	0.14%	-976	-10.28%	9,490
Brooke	3,858	59.34%	2,037	31.33%	558	8.58%	48	0.74%	1,821	28.01%	6,501
Cabell	15,581	47.26%	16,211	49.17%	1,133	3.44%	44	0.13%	-630	-1.91%	32,969
Calhoun	1,399	38.51%	2,231	61.41%	2	0.06%	1	0.03%	-832	-22.90%	3,633
Clay	1,843	47.02%	2,037	51.96%	40	1.02%	0	0.00%	-194	-4.95%	3,920
Doddridge	2,777	62.70%	1,594	35.99%	57	1.29%	1	0.02%	1,183	26.71%	4,429
Fayette	10,555	46.79%	9,563	42.39%	2,411	10.69%	29	0.13%	992	4.40%	22,558
Gilmer	1,570	36.09%	2,750	63.22%	28	0.64%	2	0.05%	-1,180	-27.13%	4,350
Grant	2,344	75.49%	658	21.19%	99	3.19%	4	0.13%	1,686	54.30%	3,105
Greenbrier	4,768	42.24%	6,048	53.58%	415	3.68%	57	0.50%	-1,280	-11.34%	11,288
Hampshire	1,172	27.88%	2,993	71.19%	38	0.90%	1	0.02%	-1,821	-43.32%	4,204
Hancock	3,775	71.08%	1,187	22.35%	320	6.03%	29	0.55%	2,588	48.73%	5,311
Hardy	1,272	33.92%	2,442	65.12%	33	0.88%	3	0.08%	-1,170	-31.20%	3,750
Harrison	15,165	49.38%	13,470	43.86%	2,009	6.54%	66	0.21%	1,695	5.52%	30,710
Jackson	3,739	55.52%	2,936	43.60%	51	0.76%	8	0.12%	803	11.92%	6,734
Jefferson	1,870	29.07%	4,368	67.90%	191	2.97%	4	0.06%	-2,498	-38.83%	6,433
Kanawha	26,018	49.14%	22,726	42.92%	4,071	7.69%	136	0.26%	3,292	6.22%	52,951
Lewis	4,839	51.10%	4,410	46.57%	218	2.30%	3	0.03%	429	4.53%	9,470
Lincoln	3,164	47.29%	3,355	50.15%	171	2.56%	0	0.00%	-191	-2.86%	6,690
Logan	7,062	46.92%	7,377	49.01%	569	3.78%	43	0.29%	-315	-2.09%	15,051
Marion	12,167	50.56%	9,386	39.00%	2,482	10.31%	31	0.13%	2,781	11.56%	24,066
Marshall	7,413	55.56%	4,710	35.30%	1,194	8.95%	25	0.19%	2,703	20.26%	13,342
Mason	4,225	52.22%	3,308	40.89%	547	6.76%	10	0.12%	917	11.33%	8,090
McDowell	12,422	62.95%	5,561	28.18%	1,716	8.70%	33	0.17%	6,861	34.77%	19,732
Mercer	9,159	42.86%	10,058	47.07%	2,122	9.93%	31	0.15%	-899	-4.21%	21,370
Mineral	3,551	49.62%	2,860	39.96%	737	10.30%	9	0.13%	691	9.65%	7,157
Mingo	4,656	42.06%	5,313	47.99%	1,077	9.73%	24	0.22%	-657	-5.93%	11,070
Monongalia	6,994	49.57%	4,977	35.27%	2,106	14.93%	33	0.23%	2,017	14.29%	14,110
Monroe	2,713	49.96%	2,686	49.47%	31	0.57%	0	0.00%	27	0.50%	5,430
Morgan	1,883	63.10%	919	30.80%	174	5.83%	8	0.27%	964	32.31%	2,984
Nicholas	3,347	45.02%	3,956	53.21%	122	1.64%	9	0.12%	-609	-8.19%	7,434
Ohio	14,402	54.09%	8,753	32.87%	3,416	12.83%	55	0.21%	5,649	21.22%	26,626
Pendleton	1,462	41.68%	2,037	58.07%	9	0.26%	0	0.00%	-575	-16.39%	3,508
Pleasants	1,619	48.72%	1,675	50.41%	26	0.78%	3	0.09%	-56	-1.69%	3,323
Pocahontas	2,782	49.14%	2,777	49.05%	92	1.63%	10	0.18%	5	0.09%	5,661
Preston	6,396	68.22%	2,445	26.08%	502	5.35%	32	0.34%	3,951	42.14%	9,375
Putnam	2,862	46.74%	2,946	48.11%	313	5.11%	2	0.03%	-84	-1.37%	6,123
Raleigh	8,643	49.43%	7,776	44.47%	1,058	6.05%	9	0.05%	867	4.96%	17,486
Randolph	3,526	36.59%	5,314	55.14%	779	8.08%	18	0.19%	-1,788	-18.55%	9,637
Ritchie	4,152	62.61%	2,403	36.23%	58	0.87%	19	0.29%	1,749	26.37%	6,632
Roane	4,097	53.90%	3,504	46.10%	0	0.00%	0	0.00%	593	7.80%	7,601
Summers	3,124	41.52%	3,998	53.14%	393	5.22%	9	0.12%	-874	-11.62%	7,524
Taylor	3,683	53.45%	2,499	36.27%	686	9.96%	22	0.32%	1,184	17.18%	6,890
Tucker	2,277	50.44%	2,127	47.12%	96	2.13%	14	0.31%	150	3.32%	4,514
Tyler	3,425	60.38%	2,137	37.68%	96	1.69%	14	0.25%	1,288	22.71%	5,672
Upshur	4,930	70.24%	1,952	27.81%	133	1.89%	4	0.06%	2,978	42.43%	7,019
Wayne	3,999	39.03%	5,870	57.29%	357	3.48%	21	0.20%	-1,871	-18.26%	10,247
Webster	1,617	38.68%	2,523	60.36%	36	0.86%	4	0.10%	-906	-21.67%	4,180
Wetzel	3,458	39.60%	4,998	57.24%	240	2.75%	36	0.41%	-1,540	-17.64%	8,732
Wirt	1,491	48.03%	1,587	51.13%	19	0.61%	7	0.23%	-96	-3.09%	3,104
Wood	10,086	50.29%	9,378	46.76%	539	2.69%	52	0.26%	708	3.53%	20,055
Wyoming	3,327	54.69%	2,358	38.76%	393	6.46%	5	0.08%	969	15.93%	6,083
Total	288,635	49.45%	257,232	44.07%	36,723	6.29%	1,072	0.18%	31,403	5.38%	583,662

== See also ==
- United States presidential elections in West Virginia
