= Dean A. Scarborough =

American businessman (born 1955)

Dean A. Scarborough (born 1955) is a businessman who became Chief Executive Officer of Avery Dennison Corporation in May 2005 and Chairman in April 2010.

== Biography ==
He was born in Lakewood, Ohio, and raised in Cleveland, Ohio. Scarborough studied Marketing and Finance and gained a Bachelor of Arts from Hiram College (1977), and an MBA from the Booth School of Business, University of Chicago (1979). In addition, he received the Executive Leadership Award at the UCLA John E Anderson Graduate School of Management.

Scarborough serves on the Board of Directors of Mattel, Inc., the Los Angeles Area Chamber of Commerce and the Los Angeles World Affairs Council. He is also a Trustee of Hiram College, the Pasadena Art Center of Design and the California Science Center Foundation. He was also a Director of the SD Los Angeles Area Chamber of Commerce (LACC).
