= American Party (1924) =

- Leader: Gilbert O. Nations
- Founded: 1924; 102 years ago
- Dissolved: 1924; 102 years ago
- Ideology: Pro-KKK politics; Anti-Catholicism; Nationalism; Temperance

The American Party of 1924 was a short-lived American political party.

== National convention ==
It met in Columbus, Ohio in June 1924, with 27 delegates present. Anti-Catholic activist former judge Gilbert O. Nations was nominated on the first ballot for President of the United States, with 20 votes to 7 for Pennsylvania Governor Gifford Pinchot, whose supporters announced that he had declined the party's nomination, insisting that he preferred to work within the Republican Party. Former California congressman Charles Hiram Randall was nominated for vice-president, with 16 votes to 10 for Georgia congressman William D. Upshaw; Upshaw supporters announced that he planned to seek the Democratic nomination for that office, and (failing that) to seek re-election to Congress. There were also calls for a merger with the Prohibition Party; more than one delegate was also a delegate to the Prohibition national convention scheduled to be held in the same city in a few days. The Prohibition Party would reject the call for merger, nominating its own slate instead. Randall later declined to run, in order to concentrate on a race for Congress in California on both the American and Prohibition party tickets; and the national committee selected Leander L. Pickett, a former member of the Prohibition Party in Kentucky, as the vice-presidential nominee.

The party platform adopted called for treaties looking to outlaw war; for censorship of foreign-language newspapers, prohibiting "foreign schools" from disseminating foreign propaganda, and restriction of immigration; for the limitation of excessive wealth; for more stringent laws against polygamy, white slavery and kidnapping; for more effective laws against election fraud; and for stricter law enforcement, especially of Prohibition.

The convention called for establishments of organizations in all state, of a national executive committee, and of a national committee composed of one man and one woman from each state.

== Ku Klux Klan ==
The American Party of 1924 was tagged as the Ku Klux Klan party; although its leaders denied this, they did announce that "counsels of the 'invisible empire' would be needed in the coming campaign, and would be given first consideration in all deliberations". Pickett would be particularly outspoken in denouncing national political figures who had denounced the Klan.

== Election results ==
The party was only on the ballot in Washington State, Tennessee, Kentucky, Florida, West Virginia, Pennsylvania, and New Jersey. Its total vote in these seven states was 23,393, or only 0.08 percent of the votes polled in all forty-eight states, with the majority coming from Washington and Pennsylvania.
