= David Brendan Hopes =

American author, playwright, and poet (born 1950)

David Brendan Hopes (born 1950 in Akron, Ohio) is an American author, playwright, and poet. He is a professor of literature at the University of North Carolina at Asheville.

== Works ==
He is the author of Bird Songs of the Mesozoic, Abbott's Dance, Man in Flight, Edward The King, 7 Reece Mews , A Dream of Adonis, A Sense of the Morning and A Childhood in the Milky Way.

Works in poetry include The Glacier's Daughters (U of Mass Press) which won the Juniper and the Saxifrage Prizes; The Basswood Tree (Franciscan Press) Blood Rose (Urthona Press), A Dream of Adonis (Pecan Grove) and Peniel (St. Julian Press).

Milkweed Editions published two collections of nature essays, A Sense of the Morning and Bird Songs of the Mesozoic. His memoir of becoming a poet, A Childhood in the Milky Way, was published by Akron University Press. As a playwright, his works include Abbott's Dance, 7 Reece Mews, Edward the King, and The Loves of Mr Lincoln (all staged in New York). Other dramatic works, St Patrick's Well, Bronzino's Gaze, Uranium 235, Washington Place and Night Music have been staged at regional venues. Night Music won the 2016 North Carolina Playwrights Prize. His novel The Falls of the Wyona won Red Hen Press's 2017 Quill Prose Award for Queer Fiction.
