= Gilbert Nations =

American lawyer

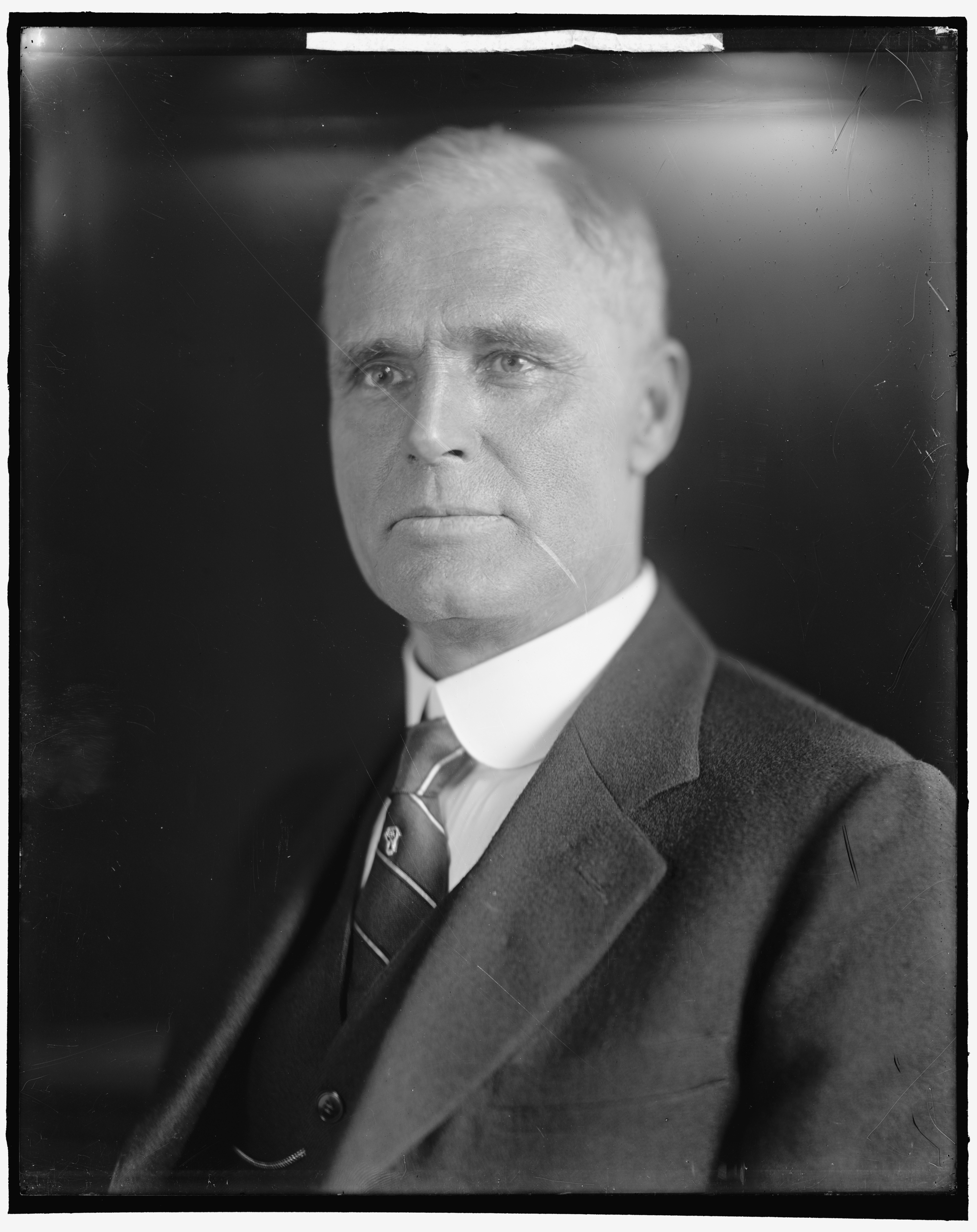
- Occupations: Judge, Lawyer, Politician

Gilbert Owen Nations (1866–1950) was an American lawyer and judge from Washington, D.C. who campaigned against Roman Catholicism in the United States. In 1924, he was the presidential nominee of an organization called the American Party. He was also a professor of Roman and Papal law at American University in Washington, D.C.

== Background ==
Born in Perry County, Missouri in 1866, Nations only had 27 months of public schooling before dropping out and studying on his own. He received a bachelor's degree from National Normal University of Lebanon, Ohio in 1890; and a master's in philosophy from Hiram College in 1900. He began practicing law in Missouri in 1902. Nations served as a probate judge in St. Francois County, Missouri. He moved to Washington, D.C. in 1916., and in 1919 received a Ph.D. from American University, one of the first issued by that institution.

== Publications ==
His publications include Constitution or Pope? Why Alien Roman Catholics can not be Legally Naturalized (1915); Papal Sovereignty, the Government within our Government (1917); Papal Guilt of the World War Washington, D.C.: The Protestant (1921); and The Canon Law of the Papal Throne (1926). He also published a periodical called The Protestant from an office in Washington; and published other periodicals called The Menace and The Fellowship Forum.

He died in 1950 in Park Ridge, Illinois.
