= 1928 United States presidential election =

Election of Herbert Hoover

- November 6, 1928

531 members of the Electoral College 266 electoral votes needed to win
- Turnout: 56.9% (▲8.0 pp)

Nominee	Herbert Hoover	Al Smith
Party	Republican	Democratic
Home state	California	New York
Running mate	Charles Curtis	Joseph T. Robinson
Electoral vote	444	87
States carried	40	8
Popular vote	21,427,123	15,015,464
Percentage	58.1%	40.9%
- Presidential election results map. Red denotes states won by Hoover/Curtis, blue denotes those won by Smith/Robinson. Numbers indicate the number of electoral votes allotted to each state.
President before election
Calvin Coolidge
Republican
Elected President
Herbert Hoover
Republican

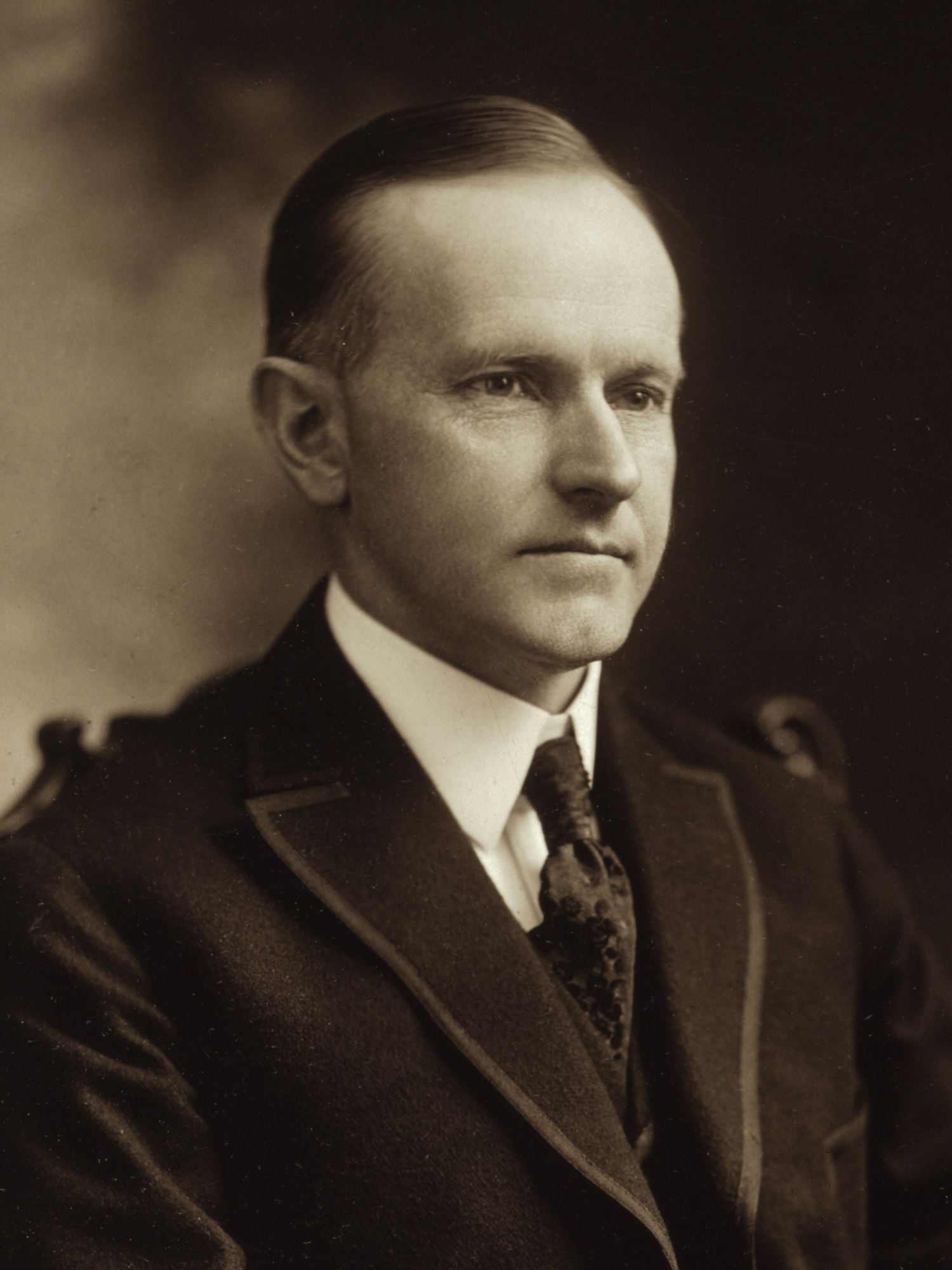
Calvin Coolidge, the incumbent president in 1928, whose second and only full term expired on March 4, 1929

A presidential election was held in the United States on November 6, 1928. In a landslide victory, the Republican ticket of Secretary of Commerce Herbert Hoover and Senator Charles Curtis defeated the Democratic ticket of New York Governor Al Smith and Senator Joseph T. Robinson.

After President Calvin Coolidge declined to seek reelection, Hoover emerged as the Republican Party's frontrunner. As Hoover's party opponents failed to unite around a candidate, Hoover received a large majority of the vote at the 1928 Republican National Convention. The strong state of the economy discouraged some Democrats from running, and Smith was nominated on the first ballot of the 1928 Democratic National Convention. Hoover and Smith had been widely known as potential presidential candidates long before the 1928 campaign, and both were generally regarded as outstanding leaders. Both were newcomers to the presidential race and presented in their person and record an appeal of unknown potency to the electorate. Both faced serious discontent within their respective parties' membership, and both lacked the wholehearted support of their parties' organization.

In the end, the Republicans were identified with the booming economy of the 1920s, and Smith, a Roman Catholic, suffered politically from anti-Catholic sentiment particularly in the Solid South, his opposition to Prohibition, and his association with the legacy of corruption by Tammany Hall. Hoover won a third straight Republican landslide and made substantial inroads in the traditionally-Democratic Solid South by winning several states that had not voted for a Republican since the end of Reconstruction. Smith carried the five states of the Deep South, his running mate's home state of Arkansas, and the Northeastern states of Massachusetts and Rhode Island.

Hoover's victory made him the first president born west of the Mississippi River, and he remains the most recent incumbent Cabinet secretary to win a presidential election. Charles Curtis became the first (and thus far the only) Native American vice president, and the first vice president with acknowledged non-European ancestry. (Note: The second was Kamala Harris, elected as Joe Biden's vice president in 2020.) This was the last Republican presidential victory until 1952. As of 2024, this is the most recent presidential election in which the winning ticket was the same party as the incumbent without being the incumbent President or Vice President; the most recent election won by the Republican Party without Richard Nixon, Donald Trump, or a member of the Bush family on the ticket; and the most recent presidential election in which the incumbent president did not seek reelection despite being eligible for another term. (Note: Three incumbent presidents since then initially sought reelection but eventually withdrew from the race: Harry S. Truman in 1952, Lyndon B. Johnson in 1968, and Joe Biden in 2024.)

== Nominations ==
=== Republican Party nomination ===
Republican Party (United States) 1928 Republican Party ticket
Herbert Hoover	Charles Curtis
for President	for Vice President
U.S. Secretary of Commerce (1921–1928)	U.S. Senator from Kansas (1907–1913 & 1915–1929)
ID: 208 votes HCV: 837 votes 2,045,928 votes

==== Other candidates ====
Candidates in this section are sorted by their highest vote count on the nominating ballot
Frank Orren Lowden	Charles Curtis	James Eli Watson	George W. Norris	Guy D. Goff	Calvin Coolidge	Frank B. Willis
Governor of Illinois (1917–1921)	U.S. Senator from Kansas (1924–1929)	U.S. Senator from Indiana (1916–1933)	U.S. Senator from Nebraska (1913–1943)	U.S. Senator from West Virginia (1925–1931)	U.S. President from Massachusetts (1923–1929)	U.S. Senator from Ohio (1921–1928)
ID: 111 votes W: Before 1st Ballot; HCV: 74 votes 1,317,799 votes	ID: 23 votes HCV: 64 votes 0 votes	ID: 33 votes HCV: 45 votes 228,795 votes	ID: 27 votes HCV: 24 votes 259,548 votes	ID: 0 votes HCV: 18 votes 128,429 votes	DTR; ID: 10 votes HCV: 17 votes 12,985 votes	Died: March 30; 84,461 votes

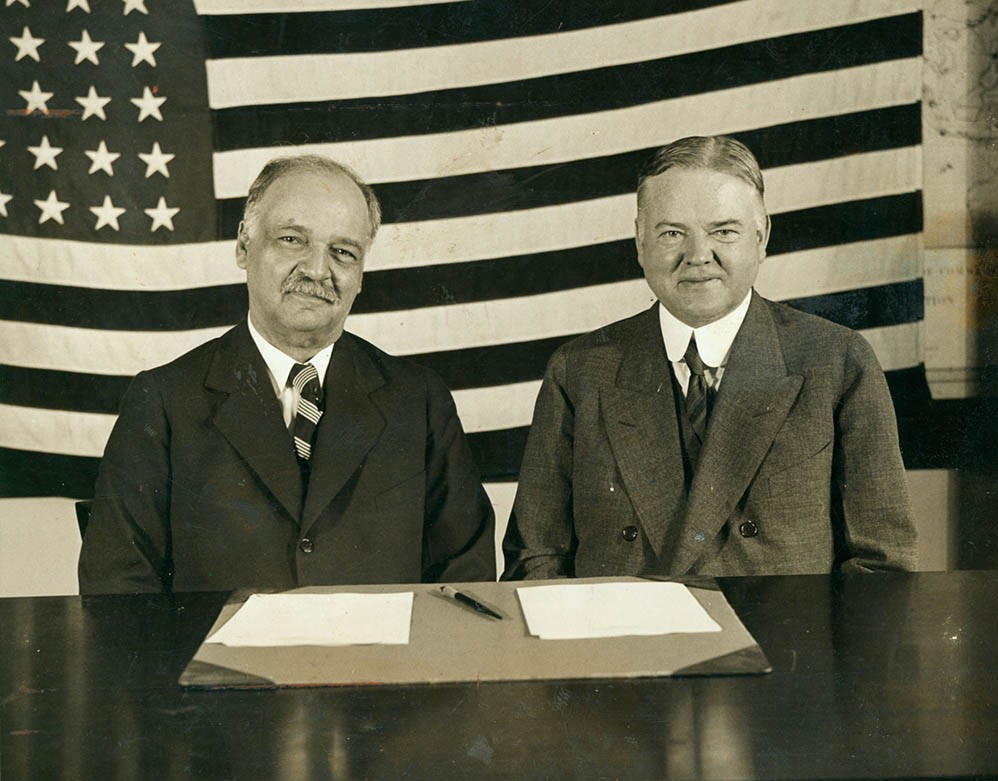
Herbert Hoover and Charles Curtis after winning the presidential and vice-presidential nominations

With President Calvin Coolidge choosing not to seek re-election, the race for the nomination was wide open. The leading candidates were Secretary of Commerce Herbert Hoover, former Illinois Governor Frank Orren Lowden and Senate Majority Leader Charles Curtis. A movement to draft Coolidge failed to gain traction with party insiders or even persuade Coolidge himself.

In the few primaries that mattered, Hoover did not perform as well as expected, leaving him with fewer than half the number of pledged delegates that he needed to win the nomination. Lowden in turn only had half the number of delegates that Hoover did, leaving it looking unlikely that the first rounds of voting would produce a majority for any candidate. Attempts were made to sound out Coolidge and Vice President Charles G. Dawes as to whether they would be willing to enter the race and break a potential deadlock between Hoover and Lowden, but both Coolidge and Dawes remained aloof. The matter was unexpectedly resolved when the convention voted to adopt a platform that repudiated the McNary–Haugen Farm Relief Bill, in turn causing Lowden to withdraw his candidacy in protest, and leaving no obvious challenger to Hoover. The only real competition that remained came from Senator Curtis, whose campaign was left with far too little time to win over the Lowden supporters.

The Republican Convention was held in Kansas City, Missouri from June 12 to 15 and nominated Hoover on the first ballot. With Hoover disinclined to interfere in the selection of his running mate, the party leaders were at first partial to giving Dawes a shot at a second term, but when that information leaked, Coolidge sent an angry telegram that said that he would consider a second nomination for Dawes, whom he hated, a "personal affront". To attract votes from farmers who were concerned about Hoover's pro-business orientation, the nomination was instead offered to Curtis. He accepted and was nominated overwhelmingly on the first ballot. Curtis was the first candidate of Native American ancestry nominated by a major party for national office.

In his memoirs, Hoover details his response upon hearing he was nominated:

My whole life has taught me what America means. I am indebted to my country beyond any human power to repay. It conferred upon me the mission to administer America’s response to the appeal of afflicted nations during the war. It has called me into the cabinets of two Presidents. By these experiences I have observed the burdens and responsibilities of the greatest office in the world. That office touches the happiness of every home. It deals with the peace of nations. No man could think of it except in terms of solemn consecration.

In a later more broadly circulated speech eight weeks after the convention ended, Hoover said: "We in America today are nearer to the final triumph over poverty than ever before in the history of this land... We shall soon with the help of God be in sight of the day when poverty will be banished from this land." That sentence would haunt Hoover during the Great Depression.

The balloting
Presidential Ballot		Vice Presidential Ballot	
Herbert Hoover	837	Charles Curtis	1,052
Frank Orren Lowden	74	Herman Ekern	19
Charles Curtis	64	Charles G. Dawes	13
James Eli Watson	45	Hanford MacNider	2
George W. Norris	24		
Guy D. Goff	18		
Calvin Coolidge	17		
Charles G. Dawes	4		
Charles Evans Hughes	1		

=== Democratic Party nomination ===
Democratic Party (United States) 1928 Democratic Party ticket
Al Smith	Joseph T. Robinson
for President	for Vice President
42nd Governor of New York (1919–1920 & 1923–1928)	U.S. Senator from Arkansas (1913–1937)
Campaign
ID: 410 votes HCV: 849.19 votes 515,389 votes

==== Other candidates ====
Candidates in this section are sorted by their highest vote count on the nominating ballot
Cordell Hull	Walter F. George	James A. Reed	Atlee Pomerene	Jesse H. Jones	Evans Woollen	William A. Ayres
Congressman from Tennessee (1923–1931)	U.S. Senator from Georgia (1922–1957)	U.S. Senator from Missouri (1911–1929)	U.S. Senator from Ohio (1911–1923)	Owner of the Houston Chronicle from Texas	Lawyer and banker from Indiana	Congressman from Kansas (1923–1934)
ID: 24 votes HCV: 71.84 votes 0 votes	ID: 28 votes HCV: 52.5 votes 0 votes	ID: 36 votes HCV: 52 votes 207,799 votes	ID: 47 votes HCV: 47 votes 13,957 votes	ID: 0 votes HCV: 43 votes 0 votes	ID: 30 votes HCV: 32 votes 146,934 votes	ID: 20 votes HCV: 20 votes 0 votes
Pat Harrison	Richard C. Watts	Gilbert Hitchcock	Edwin T. Meredith	Henry T. Allen	Albert Ritchie	Thomas J. Walsh
U.S. Senator from Mississippi (1919–1941)	Chief Justice of South Carolina (1927–1930)	U.S. Senator from Nebraska (1911–1923)	U.S. Secretary of Agriculture from Iowa (1920–1921)	Major General from Kentucky	Governor of Maryland (1920–1935)	U.S. Senator from Montana (1913–1933)
ID: 0 votes HCV: 20 votes 0 votes	ID: 0 votes HCV: 18 votes 0 votes	ID: 16 votes HCV: 16 votes 51,019 votes	ID: 2 votes HCV: 0 votes 57 votes	ID: 0 votes HCV: 0 votes 0 votes	ID: 16 votes W: June 18; 0 votes	ID: 0 votes W: May 5; 60,243 votes

Owing to the economic prosperity in the country and rapidly fading public memory of the Teapot Dome scandal, the Democratic Party's prospects looked dim. New York Governor Al Smith had previously made two attempts to secure the Democratic nomination.

The 1928 Democratic National Convention was held in Houston, Texas, on June 26 to 28, and Smith became the candidate on the first ballot.

The leadership asked the delegates to nominate Senator Joseph Taylor Robinson of Arkansas, in many ways Smith's political polar opposite, to be his running mate, and Robinson was nominated for vice-president.

Smith was the first Roman Catholic to gain a major party's nomination for president, and his religion became an issue during the campaign. Many Protestants feared that Smith would take orders from church leaders in the Vatican in making decisions affecting the country.

The Balloting
Presidential Ballot	1st Before Shifts	1st After Shifts	Vice Presidential Ballot	1st
Al Smith	724.67	849.19	Joseph Taylor Robinson	1,035.17
Cordell Hull	71.84	50.84	Alben W. Barkley	77
Walter F. George	52.5	52.5	Nellie Tayloe Ross	31
James A. Reed	48	52	Henry Tureman Allen	28
Atlee Pomerene	47	3	George L. Berry	17.5
Jesse H. Jones	43	43	Dan Moody	9.33
Evans Woollen	32	7	Duncan U. Fletcher	7
Pat Harrison	20	8.5	John H. Taylor	6
William A. Ayres	20	3	Lewis Stevenson	4
Richard C. Watts	18	18	Evans Woollen	2
Gilbert Hitchcock	16	2	Joseph Patrick Tumulty	1
A. Victor Donahey	5	5		
Houston Thompson	2	2		
Theodore G. Bilbo	0	1		

=== Other candidates ===
==== Socialist Party ====
1928 Socialist Party ticket
Norman Thomas	James H. Maurer
for President	for Vice President
Presbyterian Minister from New York	State Representative from Pennsylvania (1915–1919)

Held in the Finnish Socialist Hall in New York City, the eighth Socialist Party Convention met on April 13. James Maurer, a former State Representative, President of the Pennsylvania Federation of Labor and then Councilman for the city of Reading, was widely considered the frontrunner in the months before the convention met. For his boomers however, Maurer stood that his duties as councilman precluded the possibility of any national tour that would be required of his nomination for the presidency, and this declination was made definitive on the tenth of April. Norman Thomas, a Presbyterian minister who had been one of Maurer's boomers and had himself made it known that he was not a candidate for the Socialist nomination rather swiftly became the new frontrunner, and plans were made for a draft effort. Thomas and Maurer were nominated unanimously for president and vice president respectively, with both men accepting their nominations.

==== Workers (Communist) Party ====
1928 Workers Party ticket
William Z. Foster	Benjamin Gitlow
for President	for Vice President
Chairman of the party from Massachusetts	State Assemblyman from New York (1918–1918)

Held in the Mecca Temple in New York City, the second Workers Party Convention met on the twenty-fifth of May. Jay Lovestone served as the convention's keynote speaker, denouncing the Democratic, Republican and Socialist Parties and claiming that the Communists would turn the next "imperialist war" into a civil war. Party Chair William Foster was named as the party's candidate for the presidency while Benjamin Gitlow, a former opponent of Foster's within the party, was named as its candidate for vice president. Scott Nearing was also considered a possible contender for either position on ticket. A platform was adopted which, in addition to calling for American workers to overthrow the capitalistic system of government, also demanded the enactment of social insurance, the repeal of the Eighteenth Amendment and the Volstead Act, a five-hour workday, the withdrawal of troops from Nicaragua and China, and the recognition of the Soviet Union.

==== Socialist Labor Party ====
1928 Socialist Labor Party ticket
Verne L. Reynolds	Jeremiah D. Crowley
for President	for Vice President
Steamfitter from Michigan	Activist from New York

Held in New York City, the tenth Socialist Labor Party Convention met on the twelfth of May. Initially the ticket was a duplicate of the one nominated four years prior, Frank Johns of Oregon for the presidency and Verne Reynolds of Michigan for Vice President; however Johns, while campaigning in Bend, Oregon, died while attempting to rescue a young boy who had fallen into the river shortly after one of his opening campaign events. With their standard-bearer having passed, the executive committee of the party tendered the presidential nomination to Reynolds, with the place of vice presidential nominee being filled by Jeremiah Crowley of New York. Speaking of the "decay of the Capitalistic System", Reynolds campaigned on the idea of Industrial democracy.

==== Prohibition Party ====
1928 Prohibition Party ticket
William F. Varney	James A. Edgerton
for President	for Vice President
Insurance Agent from New York	Poet and Philosopher from Virginia

Held at the La Salle Hotel in Chicago, the fifteenth Prohibition Party Convention met on the tenth of July. Dr. D. Leigh Colvin and other Prohibitionists had found both the Republican and Democratic planks regarding Prohibition as unsatisfactory, and there was open discussion of nominating a ticket despite the continued reversals the party had suffered since 1920. The name of former Governor Gifford Pinchot of Pennsylvania was bandied about as a potential contender, though there were those like Colvin who wanted to take advantage of the Democrat's nomination of a Wet Catholic by nominating a Dry Southern Democrat to the head of the ticket in the hopes of carrying one of the Southern states; William Gibbs McAdoo, Senator Robert Owen of Oklahoma, and former IRS Commissioner Daniel Roper were other names considered for a draft. A merger with the Farmer-Labor Party was contemplated for a time, and a committee was appointed which named a potential ticket of Gifford Pinchot for President and former Governor William Ellery Sweet of Colorado for Vice President; however neither man responded to inquiries whether they would accept the nomination, and eventually both the Prohibition and Farmer-Labor Parties tabled motions calling for fusion.

There remained immense pressure within the party to name Herbert Hoover as their choice for president despite his dithering on the issue of Prohibition enforcement in the eyes of the stricter Drys, and indeed when the balloting for the presidential nomination commenced Hoover was found to be the second most popular choice of the delegates. Those opposed to Hoover rallied on the second ballot however behind frontrunner William F. Varney, an insurance salesman and party regular from New York. James Edgerton, a Virginian native who had headed the Jefferson-Lincoln League in the failed effort to fuse the Prohibition and Farmer-Labor Parties, was nominated for the vice presidency. An olive branch was still offered to Hoover however, with the Prohibition Party promising to withdraw their ticket and endorse his candidacy were he make a public declaration in favor of Prohibition, that they would uphold the Volstead Act, and that they would present legislation to better enforce both during their term as president. Indeed, there remained a concerted effort to withdraw the ticket from the race, resulting in a meeting by the Party National Executive Committee on whether Varney should drop out. Varney himself was opposed to this plan, and in a narrow vote, four to three, the effort to effectively endorse Hoover for the presidency failed. Still, there remained a concern that the ticket might potentially spoil the race and accidentally result in Smith's election to the presidency, and so care was taken to avoid any repeat of 1884; Prohibition Party electors were not filed in New York, and Varney and Edgerton were to confine their campaigning to the Solid South and the Border States, reasoning that many Dry Democrats there might still vote for Smith unless they were given a third option.

==== Farmer-Labor Party ====
1928 Farmer-Labor Party ticket
Frank E. Webb	LeRoy R. Tillman
for President	for Vice President
Colonel from California	Businessman from Georgia

Held in Chicago, the third Farmer-Labor Party Convention met on the tenth of July. A merger with the Prohibition Party was contemplated for a time, and a committee was appointed which named a potential ticket of Gifford Pinchot for president and former Governor William Ellery Sweet of Colorado for Vice President; however neither man responded to inquiries whether they would accept the nomination, and eventually both the Farmer-Labor and Prohibition Parties tabled motions calling for fusion. Initially the party had nominated Senator George Norris of Nebraska for President, but Norris adhered to an earlier declaration that he had made where he felt that the political machinery necessary to wage a successful campaign for the presidency was not possible to establish so late in the campaigning season. To run alongside Norris the party had named William J. Vereen of Georgia, a cotton textile manufacturer, but refused to consider his nomination under any circumstances once the press had brought it to his attention. Some months later the presidential nomination was tendered to Colonel Frank Elbridge Webb of California, with the vice presidential nomination being offered to Senator James Reed of Missouri after Webb rejected the idea of potentially running with Senator James Heflin of Alabama; as with Vereen, Reed had no prior knowledge of his impending nomination and wholly rejected it, purportedly saying "Who in hell is Webb?". A third man, Dr. Henry Alexander of North Carolina was then nominated in Reed's stead, but on September 18 Alexander requested that his name be withdrawn from the ticket and he later endorsed Al Smith for the presidency. At some point after LeRoy Tillman, a nephew of the late Senator Benjamin Tillman of South Carolina, was nominated in Alexander's stead.

== General election ==
=== Religion's role in the campaign ===
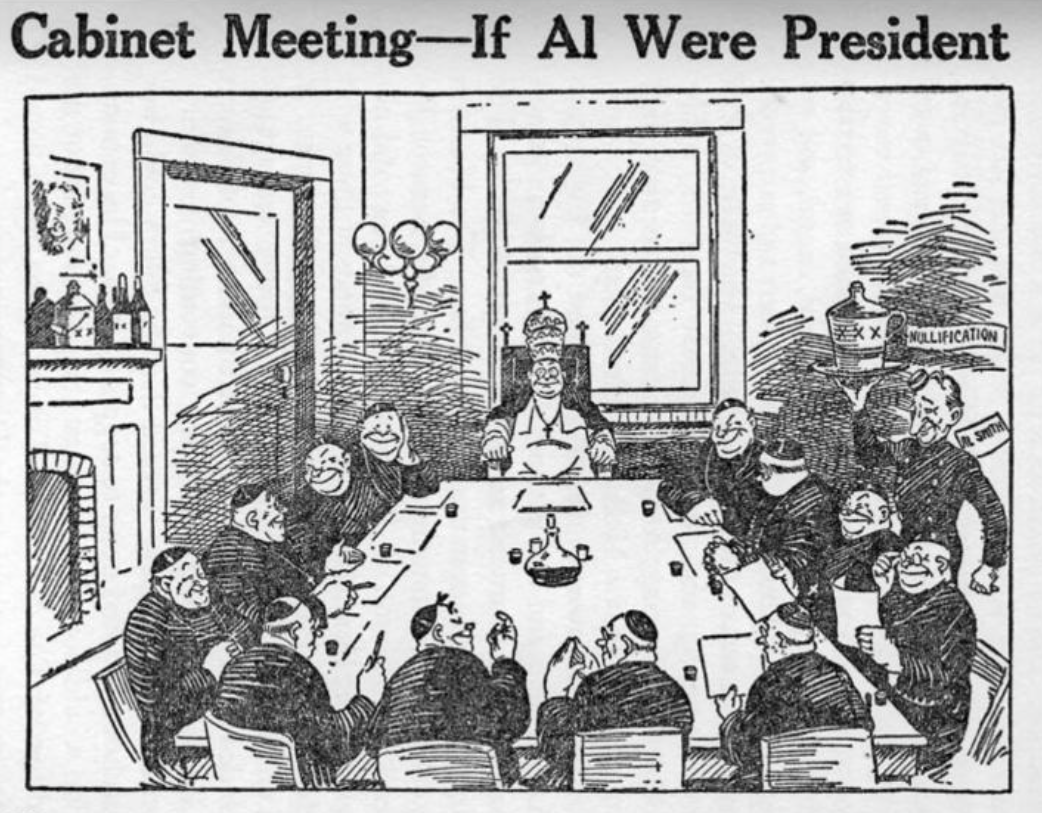
Anti-Catholic caricature from 1928 United States election

Anti-Catholicism was a significant burden for Smith's campaign. Protestant ministers warned that he would take orders from the Pope, whom many Americans sincerely believed would move to the United States to rule the country from a fortress in Washington, DC. A popular joke of the time was that Smith sent a one-word telegram after the election to Pope Pius XI saying, "Unpack." Beyond the conspiracy theories, a survey of 8,500 Southern Methodist Church ministers found only four who supported Smith, and the northern Methodists, Southern Baptists, and Disciples of Christ were similar in their opposition. Many voters who rejected the anti-Catholic Ku Klux Klan, which had declined from its peak in the mid 1920s until the 1928 campaign partially revived it, justified their opposition to Smith on their belief that the Catholic Church was an "un-American" and "alien culture" that opposed freedom and democracy.

An example was a statement issued in September 1928 by the National Lutheran Editors' and Managers' Association that opposed Smith's election. The manifesto, written by Dr. Clarence Reinhold Tappert, warned about "the peculiar relation in which a faithful Catholic stands and the absolute allegiance he owes to a 'foreign sovereign' who does not only 'claim' supremacy also in secular affairs as a matter of principle and theory but who, time and again, has endeavored to put this claim into practical operation." The Catholic Church, the manifesto asserted, was hostile to American principles of separation of church and state and of religious toleration. Groups circulated a million copies of a counterfeit oath, claiming that fourth-degree Knights of Columbus members swore to exterminate Freemasons and Protestants and to commit violence against anyone if the church ordered. Smith's opposition to Prohibition, a key reform promoted by Protestants, also lost him votes, as did his association with Tammany Hall. Because many anti-Catholics used the issues to cover for their religious prejudices, Smith's campaign had difficulty denouncing anti-Catholicism as bigotry without offending others who favored Prohibition or disliked Tammany corruption.

Contemporary Prohibition activists said that their main problem with the Democratic candidate was his faith and not any political view. Bob Jones Sr., a prominent Protestant pastor in South Carolina, said: "I'll tell you, brother, that the big issue we've got to face ain't the liquor question. I'd rather see a saloon on every corner of the South than see the foreigners elect Al Smith president". A Methodist newspaper in Georgia called Catholicism "a degenerate type of Christianity," while Southern Baptist churches ordered their followers to vote against Smith, claiming that he would close down Protestant churches, end freedom of worship and prohibit reading the Bible. Charles Hillman Fountain, a Protestant writer, insisted that Catholics should be barred from holding any office. Farris states that "More disturbing than the ridiculous and the dangerous was the respectable anti-Catholicism", as contemporary newspapers and Protestant churches tried to mask their anti-Catholicism as genuine concern. Protestant activists insisted that Catholicism represented an alien culture and medieval mentality, claiming that Catholicism was incompatible with American democracy and institutions. Catholics were portrayed as reactionary despite being more left-wing than mainstream American Protestant congregations at the time. William Allen White, a renowned newspaper editor, warned that Catholicism would erode the moral standards of America, saying that "the whole Puritan civilization which has built a sturdy, orderly nation is threatened by Smith." While Herbert Hoover avoided raising the issue of Catholicism on the campaign trail, he defended the Protestant actions in a private letter:

There are many people of intense Protestant faith to whom Catholicism is a grievous sin, and they have as much right to vote against a man for public office because of that belief. That is not persecution.

Those issues made Smith lose several states of the Solid South that had been carried by Democrats since Reconstruction. However, in many southern states with sizable African American populations, the vast majority of whom could not vote due to poll taxes, restricted primaries, and hostile local election officials, it was widely believed that Hoover supported integration or at least was not committed to maintaining segregation. This overcame opposition to Smith's campaign in areas with large nonvoting black populations. Mississippi Governor Theodore G. Bilbo claimed that Hoover had met with a black member of the Republican National Committee and danced with her. Hoover's campaign quickly denied the "untruthful and ignoble assertion".

Smith's religion helped him with Roman Catholic New England immigrants, especially Irish-Americans and Italian-Americans, which may have explained his narrow victories in traditionally-Republican Massachusetts and Rhode Island and his narrow loss in his home state of New York, where previous Democratic presidential candidates had lost by double digits, but Smith lost by only 2%.

=== General campaign reflections ===
1928 drawing of the Republican nominee for President, Herbert Hoover (who'd later win in the 1928 election)

Overall Hoover's Memoirs reflect that it was a fairly grueling campaign:

Anyone who believes that a Presidential campaign includes a luxurious life for the candidate needs further instruction. The preparation of addresses is a job in itself. And the pneumatic drill on one's brain of personalities, committees, crowds, messages, and incidents never ceases all the eighteen-hour day. Speeches must be spaced in each part of the country. The local committee at every depot must ride to the next station. Hundreds of thousands of people at train stops must have some sort of speech. Thousands of babies must be shaken by their plump fists. About the most painful thing is to preserve the ego of that part of mankind which expects to be personally remembered by name. In a reception line in Chicago a lady said, "Don't you remember me?" and waited sternly for an answer. I try to be honest, so I replied, "I am sorry, madam, but I would like to and no doubt could, if you will tell me where we met." She said rather indignantly, "Why, I sat on the end of the third row when you spoke in Indianapolis, and you looked right at me." Another trial of campaign life is the autograph. I am convinced that I have half a million in circulation. Certainly there is inflation in these issues.

Radio in 1920s elections was growing in importance and both parties used it widely, despite neither Hoover nor Smith being, unlike Coolidge, a good radio speaker. Radio stations no longer offered free airtime, but Republicans prepared a 30-minute pro-Hoover speech that local citizens broadcast on 174 radio stations. Democrats used vaudeville stars to promote Smith, as well as a radio play of the candidate's life. The League of Women Voters sponsored a series of nonpartisan broadcasts that 20 million listeners—half of the total audience—heard via 22 stations.

Live radio broadcast of election returns, November 5, 1928 (MOHAI 6589)

About radio and other methods he used during the campaign, Hoover said:

I made only seven major addresses during the campaign. I spoke at Palo Alto, West Branch (Iowa), Elizabethton (Tennessee), Newark (New Jersey), Boston, New York, and St. Louis, with back-platform remarks along the way. For the first time the radio was in full use in a Presidential election. That invention had made it impossible for Presidential candidates to repeat the same speech with small variations, as had been the practice in those happier speaking times. Then paragraphs could be polished up, epigrams used again and again, and eloquence invented by repeated tryouts. Now every speech had to be original and new. Inasmuch as I have refused all my life to use a ghost writer, I required intervals of two or three weeks to prepare each address.

Robert Moses of New York once told me of an experience in ghostwritten speeches. As a young reporter he had been attached to Mr. HyIan’s campaign for Mayor of New York. Hylan had only one speech and that advocating a five-cent subway fare. As the campaign went on, the Mayor had repeated it in all parts of the city until it was worn out. Finally he asked Bob to write him a different speech. Bob was greatly flattered and worked diligently. The final sentence of the peroration was, "I call for the spirit of 1776." Hylan stumbled through the strange vocabulary and diction and finally braced himself for the last line— "I call for the spirit of one, seven, seven, six."

While campaign statements are of no great romantic interest, the historian gleans something of economics, ideologies, and politics from them. I shall not cumber this text with a repetition of the arguments. All my addresses have been published in full. Among the topics debated were: the broad principles of government, various needed reforms, foreign relations and national defense, agricultural policies, labor policies, business regulation, prohibition, use of water resources, the tariff, and the approaches of collectivism. Concerning many subjects touched upon there was no great difference between Governor Smith and myself. Such were reform of the judicial procedure; the prison system; the promotion of child welfare; better housing; the elimination of national wastes; better organization of the Federal government; control of immigration; development of water resources; and oil conservation.

== Results ==
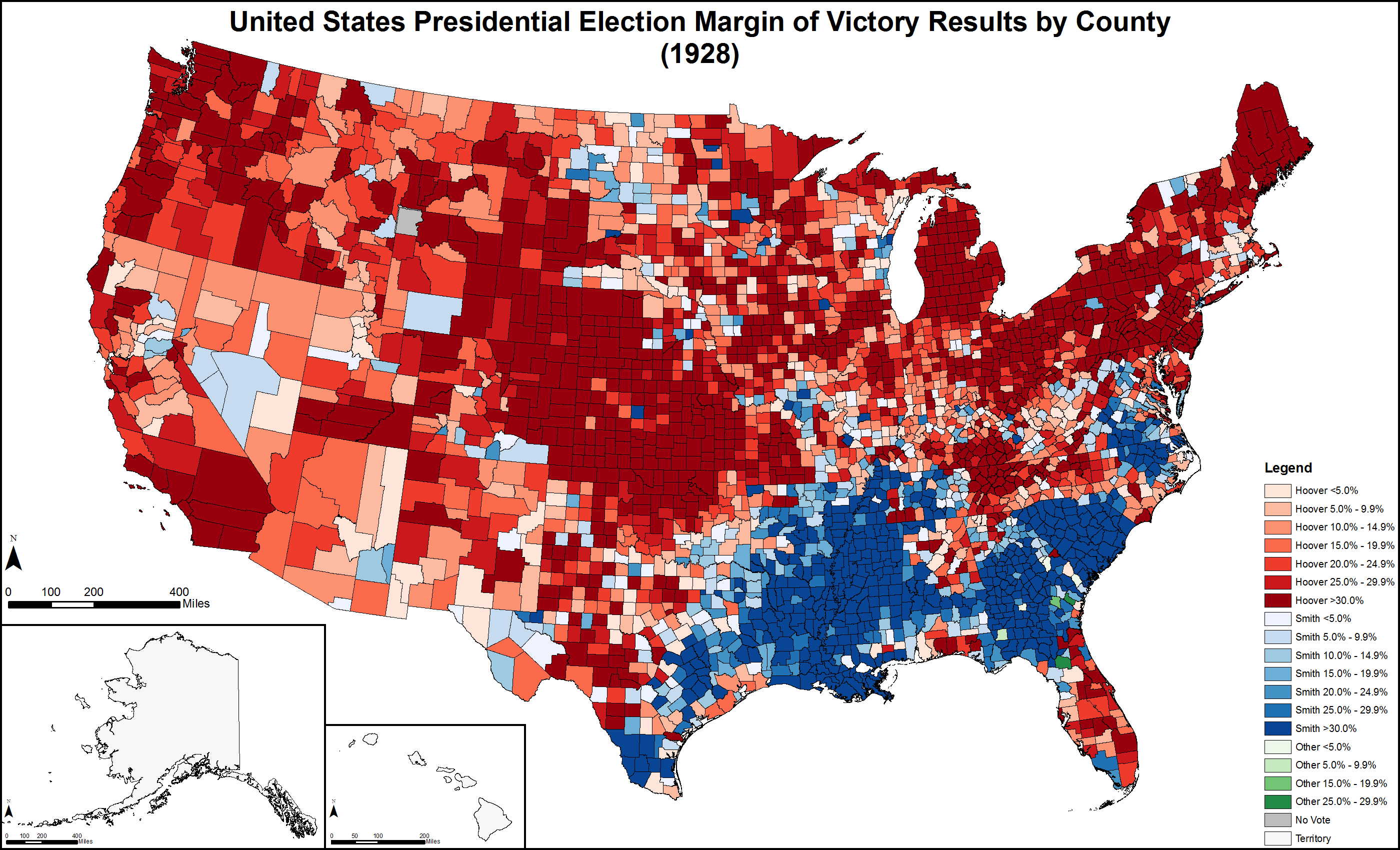
Results by county explicitly indicating the margin of victory for the winning candidate. Shades of red are for Hoover (Republican) and shades of blue are for Smith (Democratic), and shades of green are for "Other(s)" (Non-Democratic/Non-Republican), gray indicates zero recorded votes, and white indicates territories not elevated to statehood.

The Hoover Family Reading Early Election Returns (1928)

The total vote exceeded that of 1924 by nearly eight million, which was nearly twice the vote cast in 1916 and nearly three times that of 1896. Every section in the Union increased its vote although the Mountain, East South Central and West South Central States did so least of all. The greatest increases were in the heavily populated (Northeastern) Mid-Atlantic and East North Central States, where more than 4,250,000 more votes were cast, more than half of the nationwide increase. There was an increase of over a million each in New York and Pennsylvania. Much of the increase could be attributed to women voting in ever increasing numbers since gaining the national vote in 1920.

Hoover won 200 counties in the Southern United States while Smith won 122 traditionally Republican counties in the Northern United States, with 77 of those counties being majority Catholic. Warren G. Harding had won in all twelve cities with populations above 500,000 in the 1920 election, but Smith won in Cleveland, Milwaukee, New York City, San Francisco, and St. Louis, and lost in Baltimore and Pittsburgh by less than 10,000 votes. Hoover won in the traditionally Democratic Birmingham, Dallas, and Houston. Smith was the first Democratic nominee in the 20th century to win a majority of the twelve largest cities in the country. The net vote totals in the twelve largest cities shifted from Republican to Democratic with Harding having won by 1,540,000 in 1920, Coolidge by 1,308,000 in 1924, while Smith won by 210,000. Samuel Lubell wrote in The Future of American Politics that Franklin D. Roosevelt's victory in the 1932 election was preceded by Smith's increased vote totals in urban areas.

Smith's results in the cities in the election improved upon John W. Davis' results in the 1924 election. The Democratic vote in Boston rose from 35.5% to 66.8%, in Milwaukee from 9.7% to 53.7%, in Saint Paul, Minnesota from 10.1% to 51.2%, San Francisco from 6.4% to 49.4%, in Cleveland from 9.1% to 45.6%, in Chicago from 20.3% to 46.5%, in Pittsburgh from 8.7% to 42.4%, in Philadelphia from 12.1% to 39.5%, in Minneapolis from 6.3% to 38.8%, in Detroit from 7.1% to 36.8%, and in Seattle from 6.6% to 31.9%. In the boroughs of New York City the vote percentages rose from 33.6% to 67.7% in The Bronx, 39.6% to 60.8% in Manhattan, 31.9% to 59.5% in Brooklyn, 31% to 53.4% in Queens, and 42% to 53.4% in Staten Island. He improved in all of those cities from James M. Cox's results in 1920.

Hoover won the election by a wide margin on pledges to continue the economic boom of the Coolidge years. He received more votes than any previous candidate of the Republican Party in every state except five: Rhode Island, Iowa, North Dakota, South Carolina, and Tennessee. The Hoover vote was greater than the Coolidge vote in 2,932 counties; it was less in 143 of the comparable counties. The 21,400,000 votes cast for Hoover also touched the high-water mark for all votes for a presidential candidate until then and were an increase of more than 5,500,000 over the Coolidge vote four years earlier. The Republican ticket made substantial inroads in the South: the heaviest Democratic losses were in the three Southern sections (South Atlantic, East South Central, West South Central). The losses included 215 counties that had never before supported a Republican presidential candidate, distributed as follows: Alabama (14), Arkansas (5), Florida (22), Georgia (4), Kentucky (28), Maryland (3), Mississippi (1), Missouri (10), North Carolina (16), Tennessee (3), Texas (64), Virginia (26), West Virginia (4). In Georgia, eight counties recorded more votes cast for "anti-Smith" electors than either major-party candidate.

The eleven states of the former Confederacy provided 7.48% of Hoover's votes, with him taking 47.41% of the vote in that region. This was the best showing for a Republican in that region at that point in time. The electoral votes of North Carolina and Virginia had not been awarded to a Republican since 1872, and Florida had not been carried by a Republican since the heavily disputed election of 1876. Texas was carried by a Republican for the first time in its history, which left Georgia as the only remaining state never carried by a Republican presidential candidate. Georgia would not be won by a Republican until 1964, when Barry Goldwater carried the state. Smith also carried staunchly Democratic Alabama by barely 7,000 votes. In all, Smith carried only six of the eleven states of the former Confederacy, the fewest carried by a Democratic candidate since the end of Reconstruction.

Smith polled more votes than had any previous Democratic candidate in 30 of the 48 states, all but Alabama, Colorado, Delaware, Idaho, Kansas, Kentucky, Montana, Nevada, New Mexico, North Carolina, Oklahoma, Oregon, South Carolina, Tennessee, Texas, Utah, Virginia, and Washington. In only four of them (Tennessee, Oklahoma, Texas, and New Mexico) did Smith receive fewer votes than Davis had in 1924. Historian Allan Lichtman notes that since the sole defining issue of the election was anti-Catholicism, it radically realigned states' voting patterns. Hoover carried Texas, Florida, North Carolina, and Virginia — none of which had backed a post-Reconstruction Republican, while Smith carried historically-Republican Massachusetts and Rhode Island despite the national Republican landslide. In doing so, Smith became the first Democrat to ever win a majority of the vote in Massachusetts, and the first since 1852 to win a majority in Rhode Island. Lichtman further proves this by pointing out that Smith and Hoover had very similar political views save for religion and Prohibition, and yet the 1928 election had a turnout of 57%, despite previous 1920s American elections having their turnouts below 50%.

Smith received nearly as many votes as Coolidge had in 1924, and his vote exceeded Davis's by more than 6,500,000. The Democratic vote was greater than in 1924 in 2080 counties and fell in 997 counties. In only one section did the Democratic vote drop below 38%, the Pacific, which was the only one in which the Republican vote exceeded 60%. However, the Democrats made gains in five sections; of those counties, fourteen had never been Democratic and seven had been Democratic only once. The size and the nature of the distribution of the Democratic vote illustrated Smith's strengths and weaknesses as a candidate. Despite evidence of an increased Democratic vote, Smith's overwhelming defeat in the electoral college and the retention of so few Democratic counties reflected Hoover's greater appeal. Smith won the electoral votes of only the Deep South of the Democratic Solid South, Robinson's home state of Arkansas, and the New England states of Massachusetts and Rhode Island, both of which had a large proportion of Catholic voters. His 87 electoral votes were the fewest that a Democratic candidate had won since the 80 votes earned by Horatio Seymour in 1868. Hoover even carried Smith's home state of New York by a narrow margin. Smith carried 914 counties, the fewest in the Fourth Party System. The Republican total leaped to 2,174 counties, a larger number than even the 1920 landslide.

Third-party support sank almost to the vanishing point, as the election of 1928 proved to be a two-party contest to a greater extent than any other in the Fourth Party System. Until the major split before the 1948 election in the Democratic Party between Southern Democrats and the more liberal Northern faction, no further significant third-party candidacies as seen in 1912 and 1924 were to occur. All "other" votes totaled only 1.08 percent of the national popular vote. The Socialist vote sank to 267,478, and in seven states, there were no Socialist votes.

It was the last election in which the Republicans won North Carolina until 1968, the last in which they won Kentucky and West Virginia until 1956, the last in which they won Arizona, California, Florida, Idaho, Illinois, Minnesota, Missouri, Montana, Nevada, New Mexico, Oklahoma, Tennessee, Texas, Utah, Virginia, and Washington until 1952, the last in which they won Maryland, New Jersey, New York, and Oregon until 1948, and the last in which they won Ohio, Wisconsin, and Wyoming until 1944.

Electoral results
Presidential candidate	Party	Home state	Popular vote		Electoral vote	Running mate		
Presidential candidate	Party	Home state	Count	Percentage	Electoral vote	Vice-presidential candidate	Home state	Electoral vote
Herbert Hoover	Republican	California	21,427,123	58.21%	444	Charles Curtis	Kansas	444
Al Smith	Democratic	New York	15,015,464	40.90%	87	Joseph T. Robinson	Arkansas	87
Norman Thomas	Socialist	New York	267,478	0.73%	0	James H. Maurer	Pennsylvania	0
William Z. Foster	Communist	Massachusetts	47,351	0.12%	0	Benjamin Gitlow	New York	0
Verne L. Reynolds	Socialist Labor	Michigan	21,589	0.06%	0	Jeremiah D. Crowley	New York	0
William F. Varney	Prohibition	New York	20,095	0.05%	0	James A. Edgerton	Virginia	0
Frank Webb	Farmer-Labor	California	6,390	0.03%	0	LeRoy R. Tillman	Georgia	0
Other			321	0.00%	—	Other		—
Total			36,807,012	100%	531			531
Needed to win					266			266

Source (Popular Vote): Leip, David. "1928 Presidential Election Results". Dave Leip's Atlas of U.S. Presidential Elections.

Source (Electoral Vote): "Electoral College Box Scores 1789–1996". National Archives and Records Administration.

Popular vote
Hoover	58.21%
Smith	40.80%
Thomas	0.73%
Others	0.26%

Electoral vote
Hoover	83.62%
Smith	16.38%

=== Geography of results ===
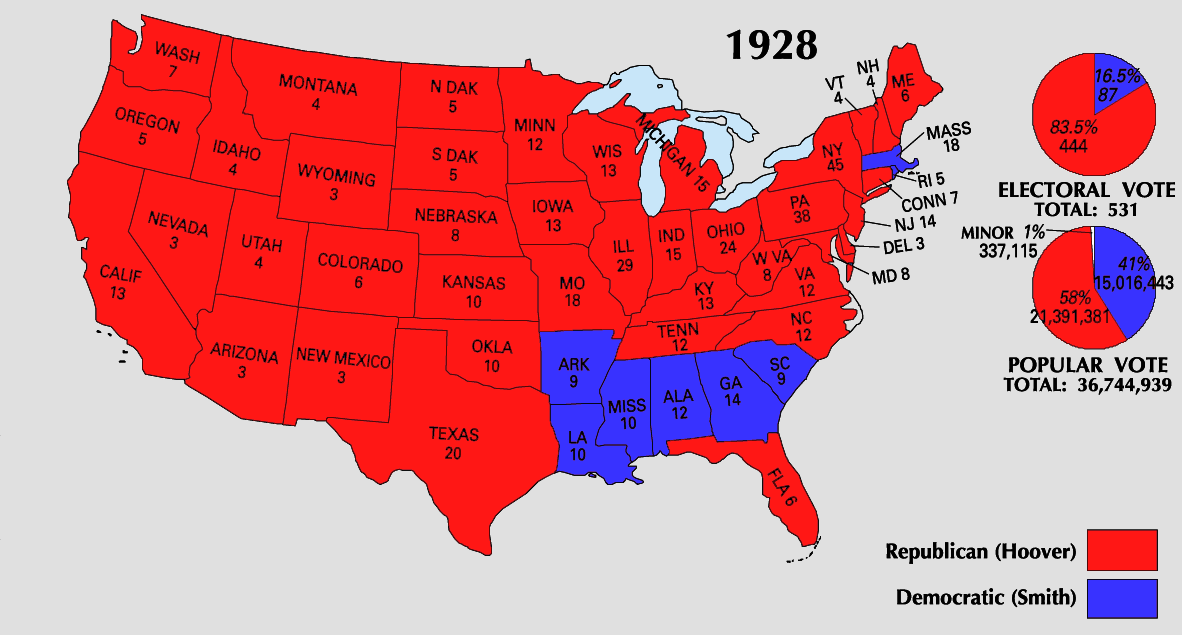

Results by county, shaded according to winning candidate's percentage of the vote

==== Cartographic gallery ====
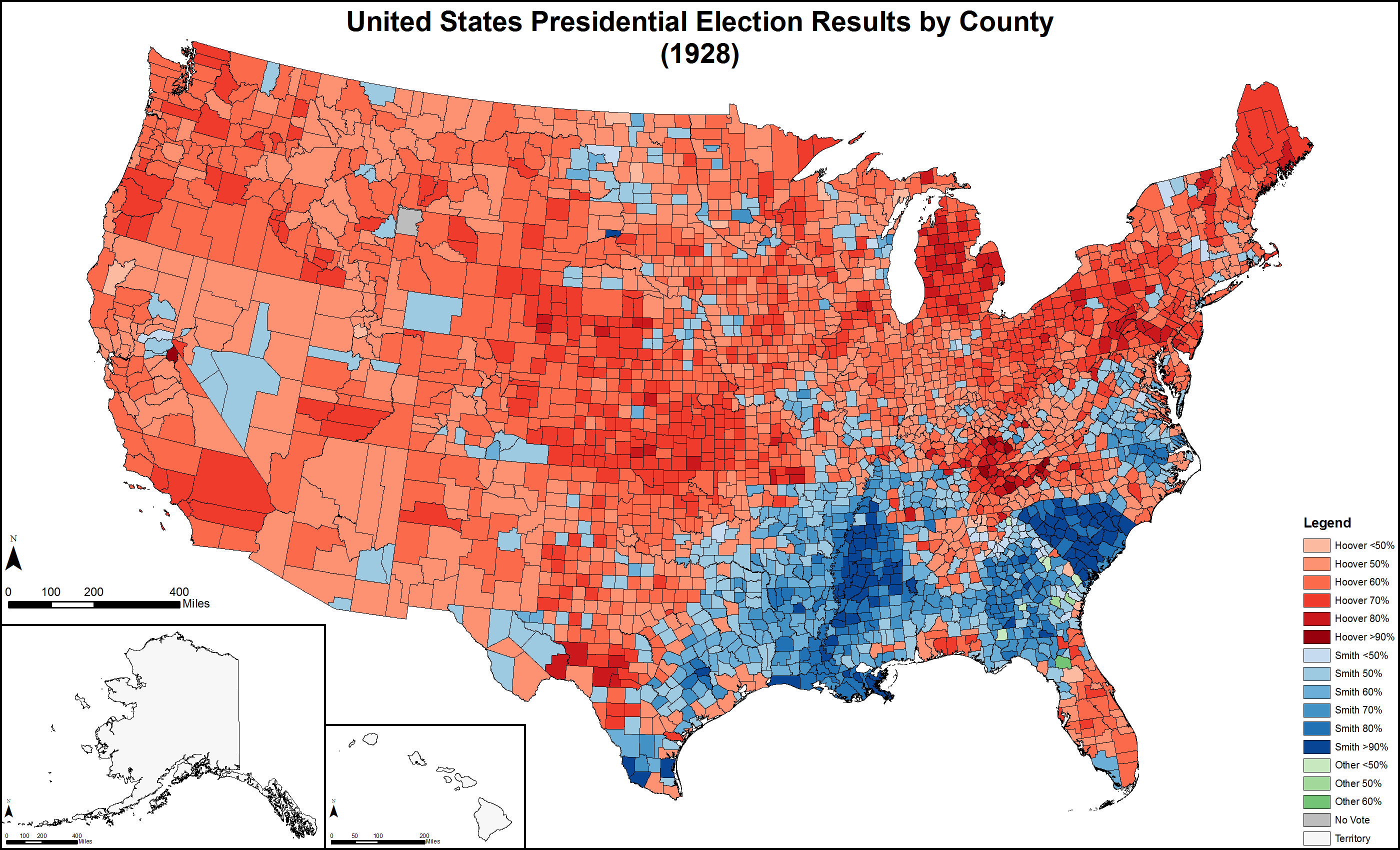
Map of presidential election results by county

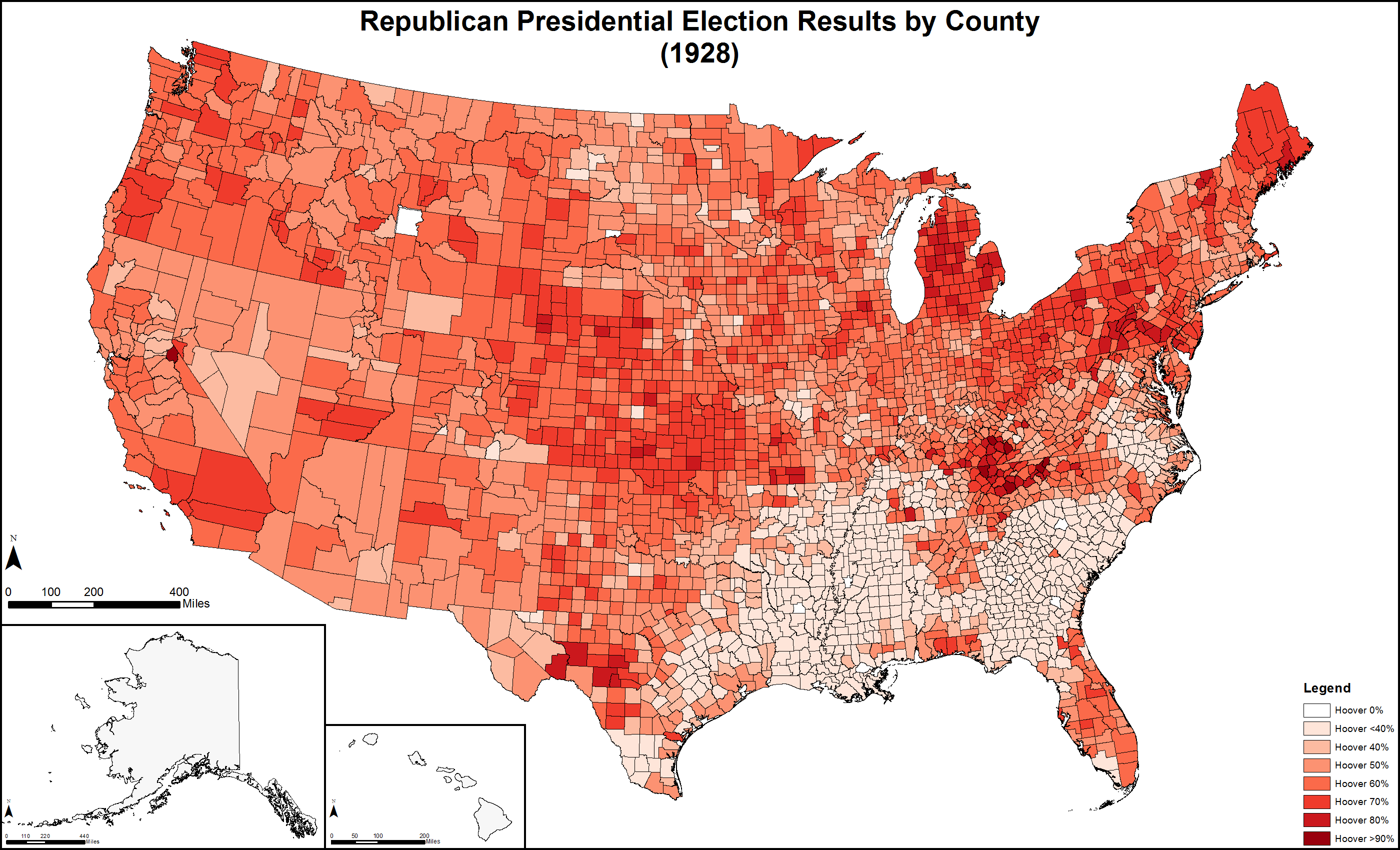
Map of Republican presidential election results by county

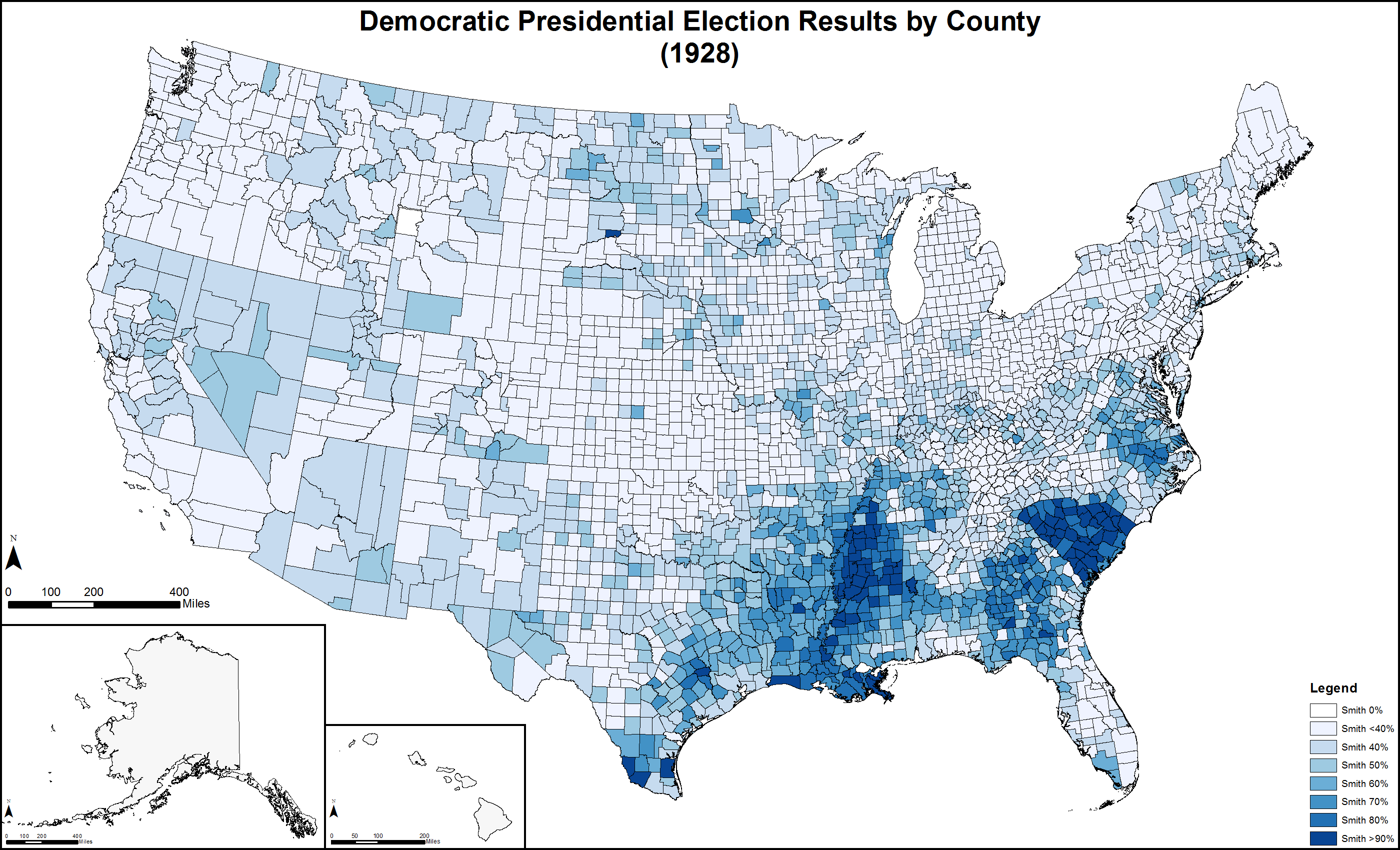
Map of Democratic presidential election results by county

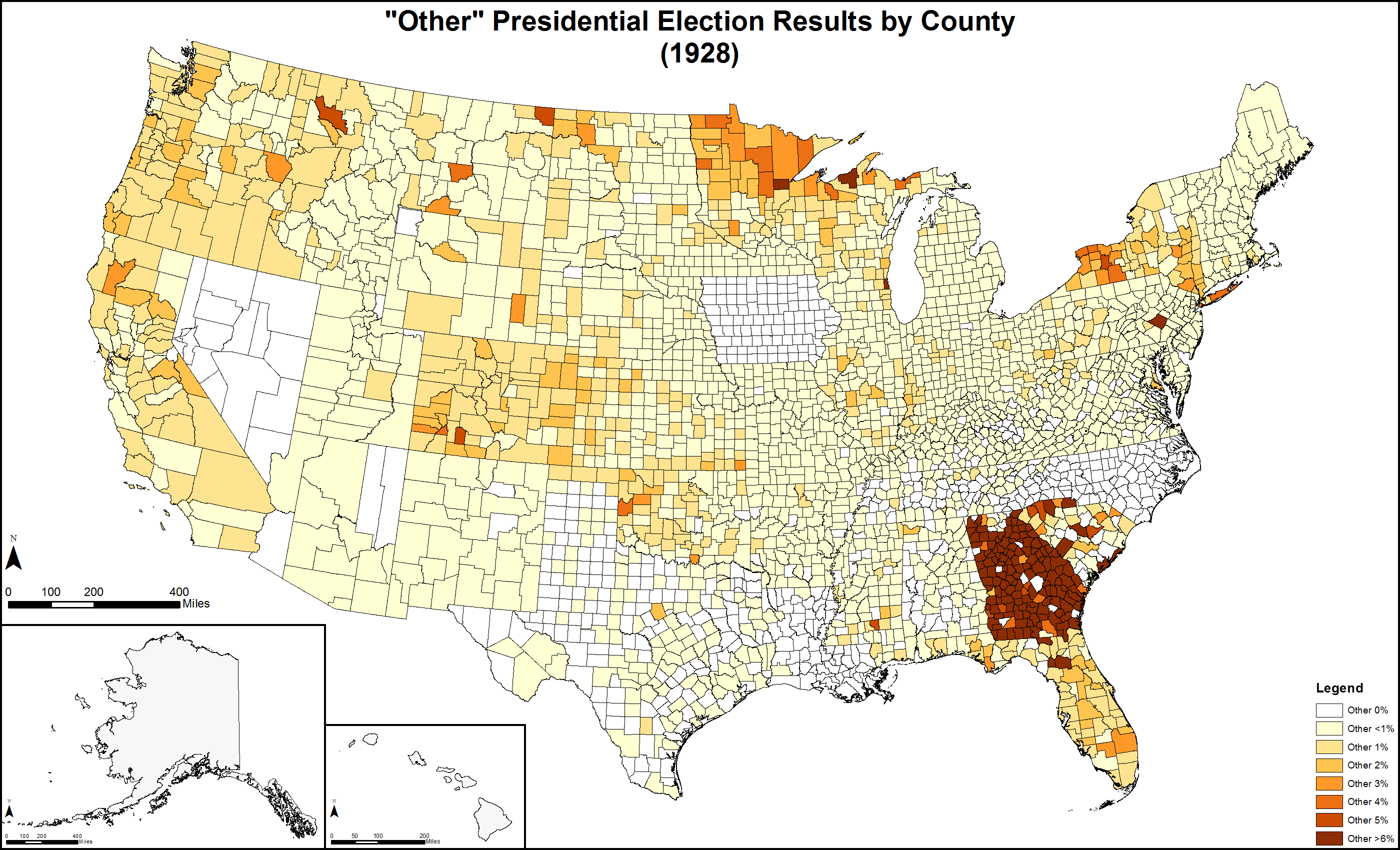
Map of "other" presidential election results by county

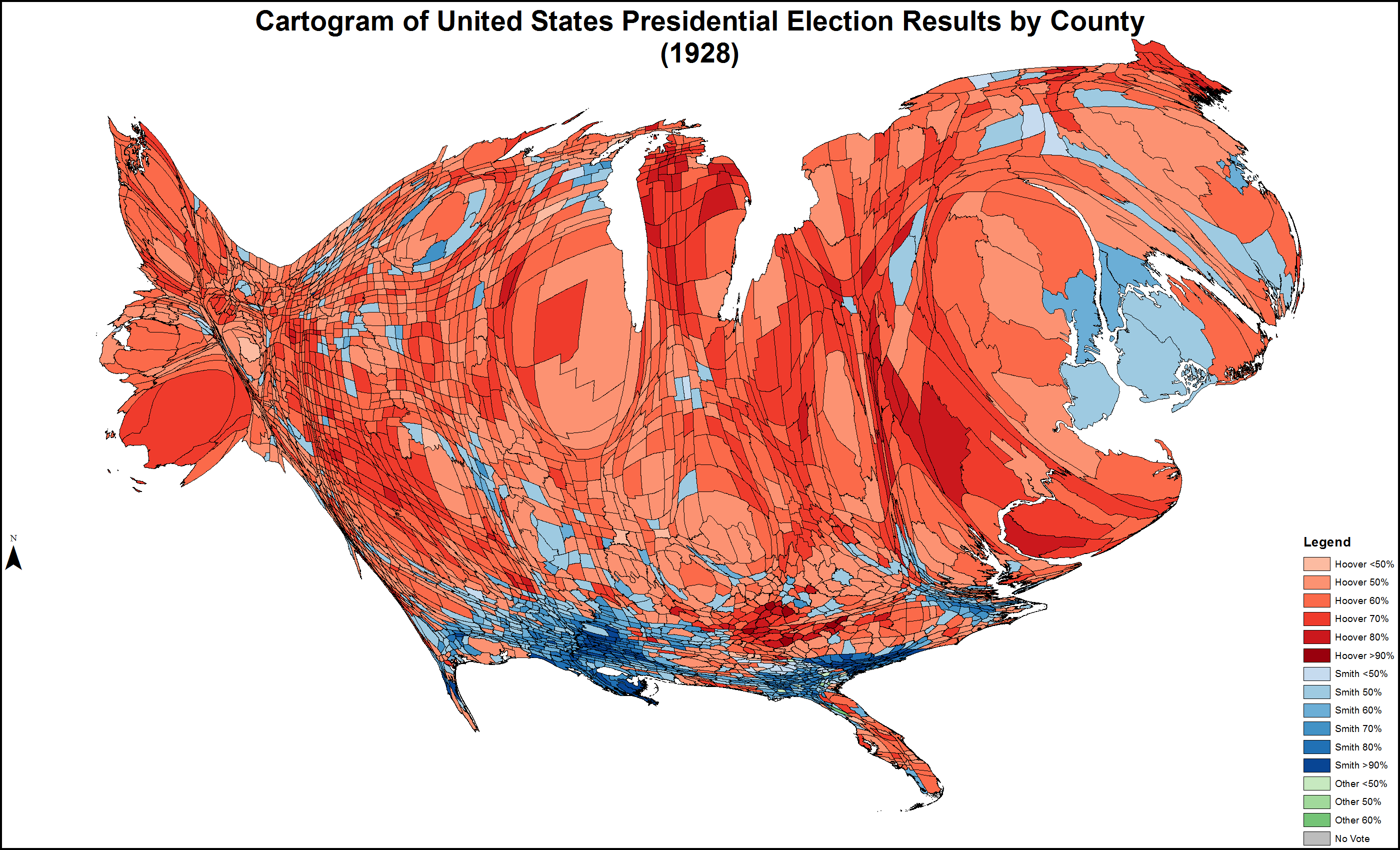
Cartogram of presidential election results by county

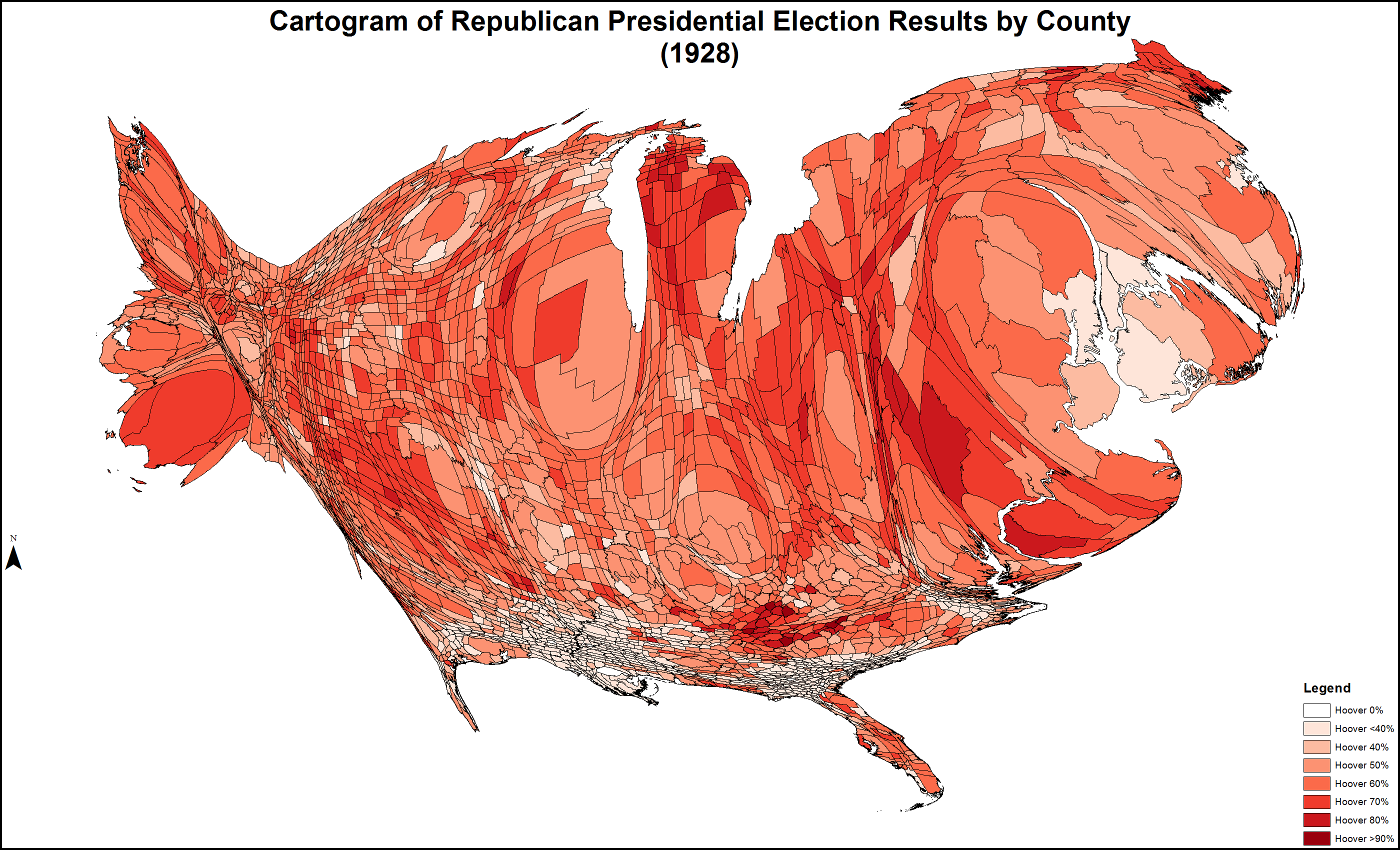
Cartogram of Republican presidential election results by county

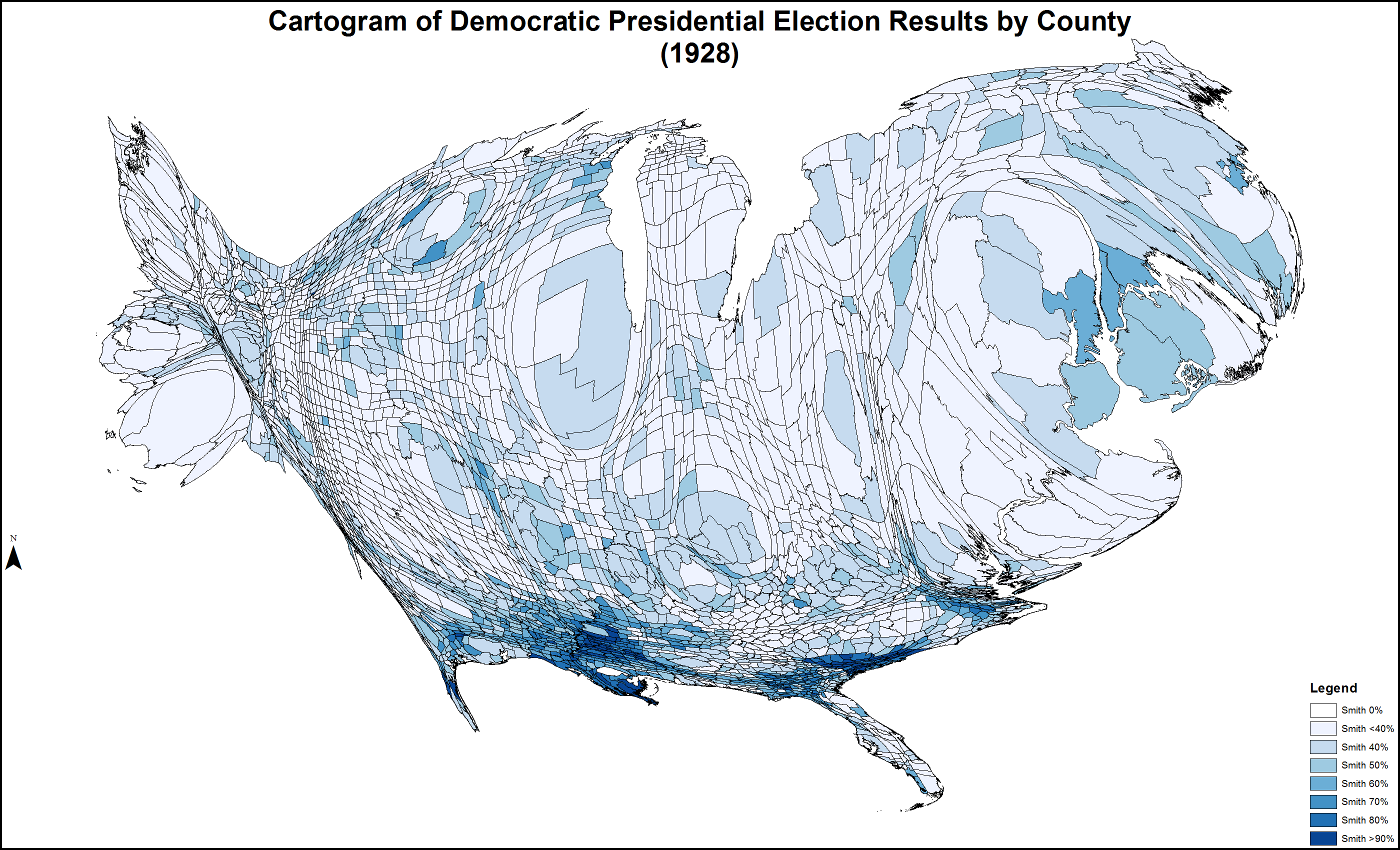
Cartogram of Democratic presidential election results by county

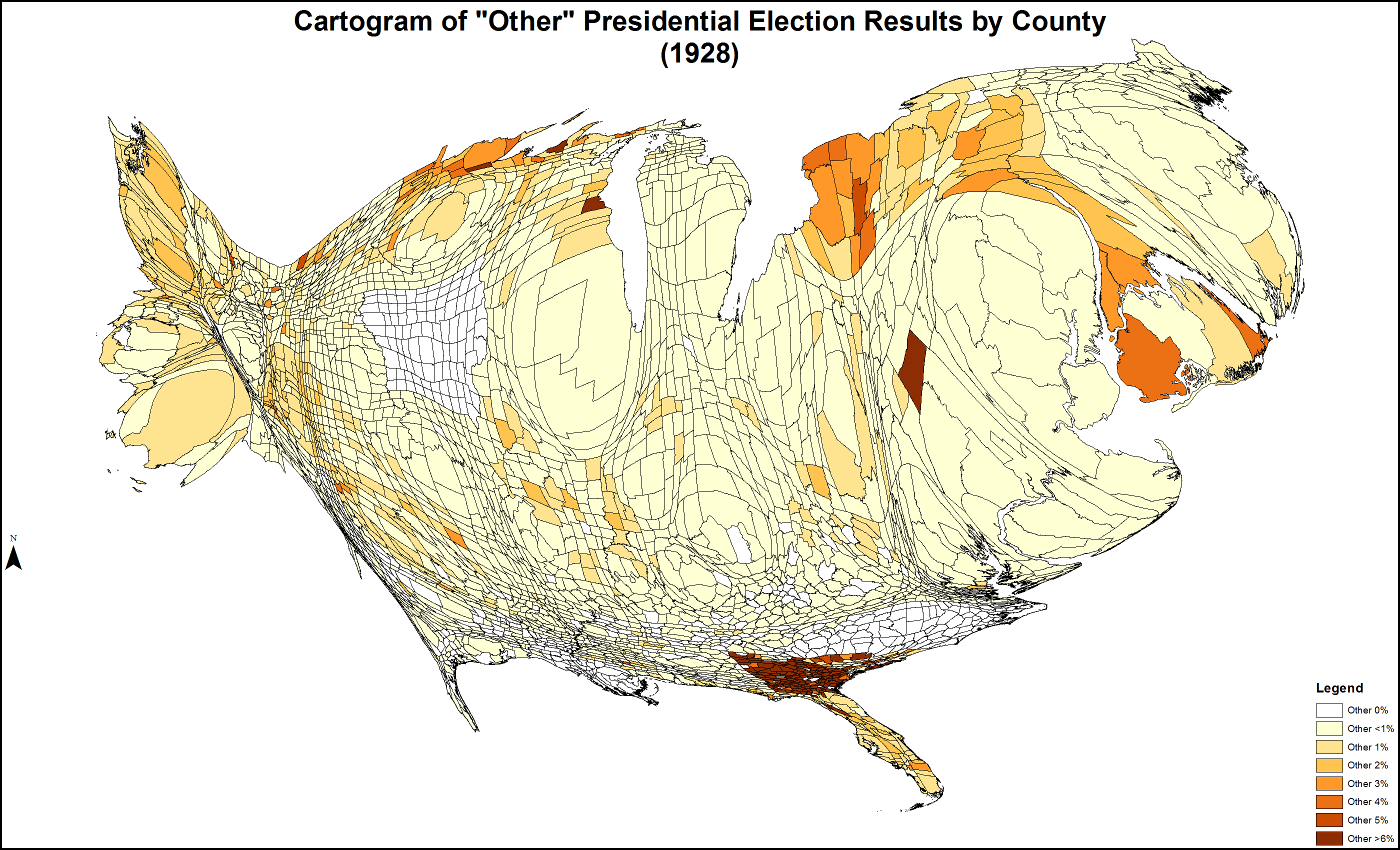
Cartogram of "other" presidential election results by county

State Level Performance for Norman Thomas' Presidential Campaign, 1928 (Socialist Party)

=== Results by state ===
States/districts won by Smith/Robinson
States/districts won by Hoover/Curtis

		Herbert Hoover Republican			Al Smith Democratic			Norman Thomas Socialist			William Foster Communist			Verne Reynolds Socialist Labor			Margin		State Total	
State	electoral votes	#	%	electoral votes	#	%	electoral votes	#	%	electoral votes	#	%	electoral votes	#	%	electoral votes	#	%	#	
Alabama	12	120,725	48.49	-	127,797	51.33	12	460	0.18	-	-	-	-	-	-	-	-7,072	-2.84	248,982	AL
Arizona	3	52,533	57.57	3	38,537	42.23	-	-	-	-	184	0.20	-	-	-	-	13,996	15.34	91,254	AZ
Arkansas	9	77,751	39.33	-	119,196	60.29	9	429	0.22	-	317	0.16	-	-	-	-	-41,445	-20.96	197,693	AR
California	13	1,162,323	64.69	13	614,365	34.19	-	19,595	1.09	-	112	0.01	-	-	-	-	547,958	30.50	1,796,656	CA
Colorado	6	253,872	64.72	6	133,131	33.94	-	3,472	0.89	-	675	0.17	-	-	-	-	120,741	30.78	392,242	CO
Connecticut	7	296,614	53.63	7	252,040	45.57	-	3,019	0.55	-	730	0.13	-	622	0.11	-	44,574	8.06	553,031	CT
Delaware	3	68,860	65.03	3	36,643	34.60	-	329	0.31	-	59	0.06	-	-	-	-	32,217	30.42	105,891	DE
Florida	6	144,168	56.83	6	101,764	40.12	-	4,036	1.59	-	3,704	1.46	-	-	-	-	42,404	16.72	253,672	FL
Georgia	14	99,369	43.36	-	129,602	56.56	14	124	0.05	-	64	0.03	-	-	-	-	-30,233	-13.19	229,159	GA
Idaho	4	97,322	64.22	4	52,926	34.93	-	1,293	0.85	-	-	-	-	-	-	-	44,396	29.30	151,541	ID
Illinois	29	1,769,141	56.93	29	1,313,817	42.28	-	19,138	0.62	-	3,581	0.12	-	1,812	0.06	-	455,324	14.65	3,107,489	IL
Indiana	15	848,290	59.68	15	562,691	39.59	-	3,871	0.27	-	321	0.02	-	645	0.05	-	285,599	20.09	1,421,314	IN
Iowa	13	623,570	61.77	13	379,311	37.57	-	2,960	0.29	-	328	0.03	-	230	0.02	-	244,259	24.20	1,009,489	IA
Kansas	10	513,672	72.02	10	193,003	27.06	-	6,205	0.87	-	320	0.04	-	-	-	-	320,669	44.96	713,200	KS
Kentucky	13	558,064	59.33	13	381,070	40.51	-	837	0.09	-	293	0.03	-	340	0.04	-	176,994	18.82	940,604	KY
Louisiana	10	51,160	23.70	-	164,655	76.29	10	-	-	-	-	-	-	-	-	-	-113,495	-52.58	215,833	LA
Maine	6	179,923	68.63	6	81,179	30.96	-	1,068	0.41	-	-	-	-	-	-	-	98,744	37.66	262,171	ME
Maryland	8	301,479	57.06	8	223,626	42.33	-	1,701	0.32	-	636	0.12	-	906	0.17	-	77,853	14.74	528,348	MD
Massachusetts	18	775,566	49.15	-	792,758	50.24	18	6,262	0.40	-	2,461	0.16	-	772	0.05	-	-17,192	-1.09	1,577,823	MA
Michigan	15	965,396	70.36	15	396,762	28.92	-	3,516	0.26	-	2,881	0.21	-	799	0.06	-	568,634	41.44	1,372,082	MI
Minnesota	12	560,977	57.77	12	396,451	40.83	-	6,774	0.70	-	4,853	0.50	-	1,921	0.20	-	164,526	16.94	970,976	MN
Mississippi	10	27,153	17.90	-	124,539	82.10	10	-	-	-	-	-	-	-	-	-	-97,386	-64.20	151,692	MS
Missouri	18	834,080	55.58	18	662,562	44.15	-	3,739	0.25	-	-	-	-	340	0.02	-	171,518	11.43	1,500,721	MO
Montana	4	113,300	58.37	4	78,578	40.48	-	1,667	0.86	-	563	0.29	-	-	-	-	34,722	17.89	194,108	MT
Nebraska	8	345,745	63.19	8	197,959	36.18	-	3,434	0.63	-	-	-	-	-	-	-	147,786	27.01	547,144	NE
Nevada	3	18,327	56.54	3	14,090	43.46	-	-	-	-	-	-	-	-	-	-	4,237	13.07	32,417	NV
New Hampshire	4	115,404	58.65	4	80,715	41.02	-	465	0.24	-	173	0.09	-	-	-	-	34,689	17.63	196,757	NH
New Jersey	14	925,285	59.77	14	616,162	39.80	-	4,866	0.31	-	1,240	0.08	-	488	0.03	-	309,123	19.97	1,548,195	NJ
New Mexico	3	69,645	59.01	3	48,211	40.85	-	-	-	-	158	0.13	-	-	-	-	21,434	18.16	118,014	NM
New York	45	2,193,344	49.79	45	2,089,863	47.44	-	107,332	2.44	-	10,876	0.25	-	4,211	0.10	-	103,481	2.35	4,405,626	NY
North Carolina	12	348,923	54.94	12	286,227	45.06	-	-	-	-	-	-	-	-	-	-	62,696	9.87	635,150	NC
North Dakota	5	131,441	54.80	5	106,648	44.46	-	936	0.39	-	842	0.35	-	-	-	-	24,793	10.34	239,867	ND
Ohio	24	1,627,546	64.89	24	864,210	34.45	-	8,683	0.35	-	2,836	0.11	-	1,515	0.06	-	763,336	30.43	2,508,346	OH
Oklahoma	10	394,046	63.72	10	219,174	35.44	-	3,924	0.63	-	-	-	-	-	-	-	174,872	28.28	618,427	OK
Oregon	5	205,341	64.18	5	109,223	34.14	-	2,720	0.85	-	1,094	0.34	-	1,564	0.49	-	96,118	30.04	319,942	OR
Pennsylvania	38	2,055,382	65.24	38	1,067,586	33.89	-	18,647	0.59	-	4,726	0.15	-	380	0.01	-	987,796	31.35	3,150,610	PA
Rhode Island	5	117,522	49.55	-	118,973	50.16	5	-	-	-	283	0.12	-	416	0.18	-	-1,451	-0.61	237,194	RI
South Carolina	9	5,858	8.54	-	62,700	91.39	9	47	0.07	-	-	-	-	-	-	-	-56,842	-82.85	68,605	SC
South Dakota	5	157,603	60.18	5	102,660	39.20	-	443	0.17	-	232	0.09	-	-	-	-	54,943	20.98	261,865	SD
Tennessee	12	195,388	53.76	12	167,343	46.04	-	631	0.17	-	111	0.03	-	-	-	-	28,045	7.72	363,473	TN
Texas	20	367,036	51.77	20	341,032	48.10	-	722	0.10	-	209	0.03	-	-	-	-	26,004	3.67	708,999	TX
Utah	4	94,618	53.58	4	80,985	45.86	-	954	0.54	-	46	0.03	-	-	-	-	13,633	7.72	176,603	UT
Vermont	4	90,404	66.87	4	44,440	32.87	-	-	-	-	-	-	-	-	-	-	45,964	34.00	135,191	VT
Virginia	12	164,609	53.91	12	140,146	45.90	-	250	0.08	-	173	0.06	-	180	0.06	-	24,463	8.01	305,358	VA
Washington	7	335,844	67.06	7	156,772	31.30	-	2,615	0.52	-	1,541	0.31	-	4,068	0.81	-	179,072	35.75	500,840	WA
West Virginia	8	375,551	58.43	8	263,784	41.04	-	1,313	0.20	-	401	0.06	-	-	-	-	111,767	17.39	642,752	WV
Wisconsin	13	544,205	53.52	13	450,259	44.28	-	18,213	1.79	-	1,528	0.15	-	381	0.04	-	93,946	9.24	1,016,831	WI
Wyoming	3	52,748	63.68	3	29,299	35.37	-	788	0.95	-	-	-	-	-	-	-	23,449	28.31	82,835	WY
TOTALS:	531	21,427,123	58.21	444	15,015,464	40.80	87	267,478	0.73	-	48,551	0.13	-	21,590	0.06	-	6,411,659	17.42	36,807,012	US

==== States that flipped from Democratic to Republican ====
- Florida
- North Carolina
- Oklahoma
- Tennessee
- Texas
- Virginia

==== States that flipped from Progressive to Republican ====
- Wisconsin

==== States that flipped from Republican to Democratic ====
- Massachusetts
- Rhode Island

==== Close states ====
Margin of victory less than 1% (5 electoral votes):

1. Rhode Island, 0.61% (1,451 votes)

Margin of victory less than 5% (95 electoral votes):

1. Massachusetts, 1.09% (17,192 votes)
2. New York, 2.35% (103,481 votes)
3. Alabama, 2.84% (7,072 votes)
4. Texas, 3.67% (26,004 votes)

Margin of victory between 5% and 10% (60 electoral votes):

1. Utah, 7.72% (13,633 votes)
2. Tennessee, 7.72% (28,045 votes)
3. Virginia, 8.01% (24,463 votes)
4. Connecticut, 8.06% (44,574 votes)
5. Wisconsin, 9.24% (93,946 votes)
6. North Carolina, 9.87% (62,696 votes)

Tipping point state:

1. Illinois, 14.65% (455,324 votes)

==== Statistics ====
Counties with Highest Percent of Vote (Republican)

1. Jackson County, Kentucky 96.52%
2. Leslie County, Kentucky 94.51%
3. Alpine County, California 94.23%
4. Johnson County, Tennessee 93.74%
5. Sevier County, Tennessee 92.57%

Counties with Highest Percent of Vote (Democratic)

1. Jackson Parish, Louisiana 100.00%
2. Armstrong County, South Dakota 100.00%
3. Humphreys County, Mississippi 99.90%
4. Edgefield County, South Carolina 99.67%
5. Bamberg County, South Carolina 99.49%

== See also ==
- History of the United States (1918–1945)
- Inauguration of Herbert Hoover
- 1928 United States House of Representatives elections
- 1928 United States Senate elections
- Al Smith 1928 presidential campaign

== Works cited ==
- Sherman, Richard (1973). The Republican Party and Black America From McKinley to Hoover 1896-1933. University of Virginia Press. ISBN 0813904676.
