= Shermanesque statement =

American catchphrase denying interest in political office

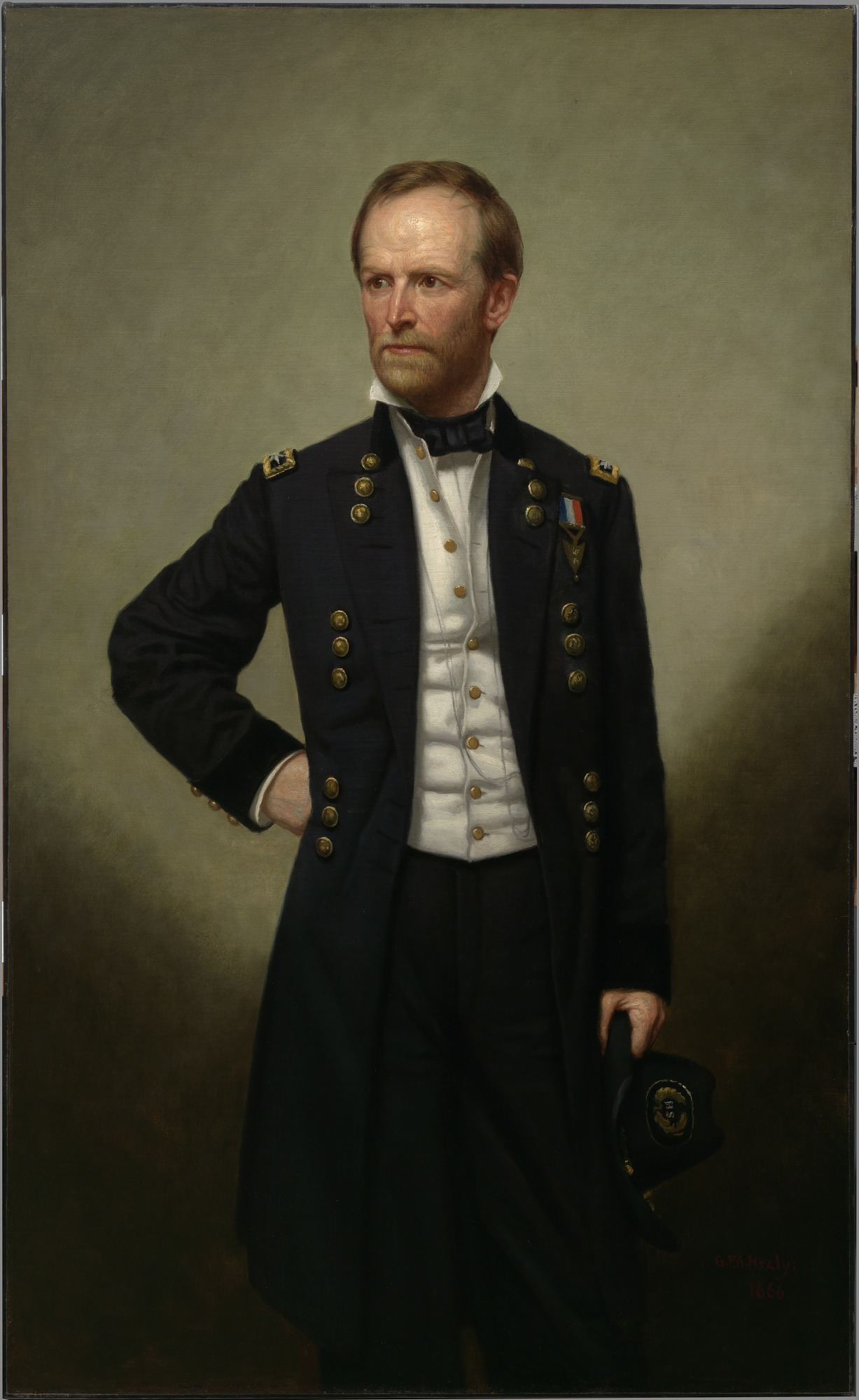
- William Tecumseh Sherman, for whom the statement is named
- Origin: "I will not accept if nominated and will not serve if elected"

A Shermanesque statement, also called a Sherman statement, Sherman speech, or the full Sherman, is American political jargon for a clear and direct statement by a potential candidate indicating that they will not run for a particular elected position.

The term derives from the Sherman pledge, a remark made by the retiring American Civil War General William Tecumseh Sherman when he was being considered as a possible Republican candidate for the US presidential election of 1884. He declined, saying, "I will not accept if nominated and will not serve if elected", and he remained uninvolved in politics until his death in 1891. Thirteen years prior, he had similarly asserted, "I hereby state, and mean all that I say, that I never have been and never will be a candidate for President; that if nominated by either party, I should peremptorily decline; and even if unanimously elected I should decline to serve." These statements are often abbreviated as "If drafted, I will not run; if nominated, I will not accept; if elected, I will not serve."

== Other iterations ==
US President Lyndon B. Johnson invoked the pledge in his March 31, 1968, national address, which focused mainly on the Vietnam War. Johnson announced that – because "partisan causes" would interfere with his duties – he would not seek a second full term, saying "I shall not seek, and I will not accept, the nomination of my party for another term as your president."

President Franklin D. Roosevelt inverted the pledge in 1944, stating that he felt obligated to serve if nominated: "If the people command me to continue in this office and in this war, I have as little right to withdraw as the soldier has to leave his post in the line." Dwight D. Eisenhower wanted "to use words similar to Sherman's" when many asked him in the 1940s to run for the presidency, but did not because he believed that no one "has the right to state, categorically, that he will not perform any duty that his country might demand of him".

Since then, journalists have often pushed for potential candidates to give a Sherman pledge in lieu of a less definitive answer. In 1983, Democratic Congressman Mo Udall of Arizona, who was noted for his wit and who had campaigned for president in 1976, was asked if he would run in the 1984 election. Udall responded, "If nominated, I shall run to Mexico. If elected, I shall fight extradition."

When asked by Fox News whether he would pursue the presidency in 2008, Vice President Dick Cheney quoted Sherman's statement nearly word-for-word. When Ohio Governor Ted Strickland endorsed Hillary Clinton in the race for the Democratic presidential nomination in 2008, he issued the Sherman pledge word for word when asked if he wanted to be selected as her vice presidential running mate. He reiterated it when asked if he wanted to be Barack Obama's running mate after Obama had clinched the nomination. David Petraeus quoted Sherman when asked about a presidential bid in 2012. Paul Ryan issued a Shermanesque statement in April 2016 when asked about the possibility of becoming a candidate in a contested convention.

In June 2004, the former Scottish National Party leader Alex Salmond said, in response to questions about whether he would seek the leadership again, that "If nominated I'll decline. If drafted I'll defer. And if elected I'll resign." A month later, he changed his mind and stood for the leadership, later becoming the First Minister of Scotland.

Author Stephen King with regard to the 2018 Maine gubernatorial election stated that "if nominated I will not run, and if elected, I will not serve. I think somebody famous said that."

== See also ==
- "I do not choose to run" — the more equivocal statement of Calvin Coolidge in 1927
