= I do not choose to run =

1927 statement by U.S. President Calvin Coolidge

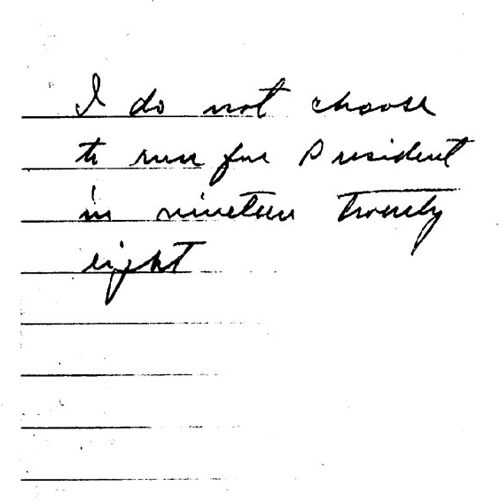
Calvin Coolidge's announcement he would not choose to run for the 1928 presidential election.

"I do not choose to run" was a statement made by president of the United States Calvin Coolidge to the press on August 2, 1927, on his decision not to run for the 1928 presidential election. The statement was ambiguous and led to considerable debate as to the intentions of its language.

== Background ==
Calvin Coolidge, a member of the Republican Party, became President of the United States in 1923 after the death of Warren Harding, and won the 1924 United States presidential election for a full four-year term. At his "Summer White House" in the Black Hills of South Dakota, Coolidge gave Secretary to the President Everett Sanders a piece of paper that said, "I do not choose to run for president in nineteen twenty eight". Sanders endorsed Coolidge's declaration, and the announcement was scheduled for the 9 a.m. press conference on Tuesday August 2, 1927.

However, to prevent an overreaction by the stock market on the East Coast, the announcement was moved to midday. At 11:30, Coolidge cut out strips of paper with his statement on them, and at the conference, handed each reporter a strip. Without providing any further information, Coolidge remarked, "There will be nothing more from this office today."

=== Presidents who did not seek reelection ===
Historically, most sitting U.S. presidents who completed one full term chose to run for a second. Seven presidents were eligible for reelection after completing at least one full term in office, but chose not to run.

== Reaction ==
=== Public reaction ===
Upon Coolidge's announcement, the gathered reporters were stunned. The public was also shocked by the announcement. Many felt Coolidge could easily win a second full term, based on "Coolidge Prosperity", the booming economy, and a surplus of over $300 million.

=== Family and colleagues ===
As early as 1924, Coolidge had mentioned that he would not run again after his 1924 campaign. He relayed this to his father after his son, Calvin Jr., died. After the election, Theodore Roosevelt Jr. "clearly remembered" Coolidge mentioning his desire not to run again, a conversation Coolidge also reportedly had with Frank Stearns at the same time. Also, Secret Service agent Edmund Starling, who served at the White House for thirty years, and protected five presidents, recounted that Coolidge decided "long ago" not to run again for office.

While some close to Coolidge knew he would not run for another term, others were stunned by his announcement, including Sanders, his personal secretary. Later in the day on August 2, Grace Coolidge found out about her husband's announcement from visiting senator Arthur Capper. She remarked, "Isn't that just like the man. He never gave me the slightest intimation of his intention. I had no idea."

== Reasons for the statement ==
After Coolidge's announcement there was much debate as to what he meant in his choice of words. Some took the language as a definitive statement that he was not willing to be president any longer. Others thought that Coolidge was hoping to be drafted by the party as a candidate, or that he did not want to serve again but would accept a draft.

=== Hope to be drafted ===
Some close to the president took the view that Coolidge was looking to be drafted by the party for the 1928 election. Vice President Charles G. Dawes believed that he "ardently" wanted the nomination. As for being drafted as the party's candidate, Coolidge later stated that he "was determined not to have that contingency arise." During his presidency Coolidge remained silent, however. Commerce secretary Herbert Hoover, himself considering a 1928 election bid, asked Coolidge if his decision was "absolutely conclusive", and the president made no direct reply. Even one of Coolidge's closest friends, Senator William M. Butler, said of the decision, "I do not know what he wants."

Had Coolidge wished, he would have been easily nominated to run again at the 1928 Republican National Convention, as party leaders wanted. Coolidge sent Sanders to tell leaders of state delegations to vote for anyone else and given his popularity he likely would have easily won the election. At the convention, those close to the president said that they had no message from Coolidge for the delegates. When the Vermont delegation asked the president three times whether he would object to voting for him, Coolidge refused to answer. The delegates concluded that voting for him would imply that they doubted the president's sincerity.

=== Desire for private life ===
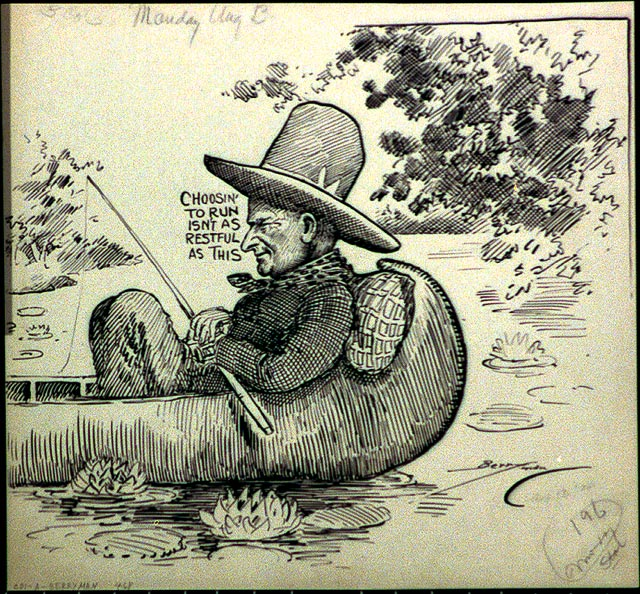
Political cartoon by Clifford Berryman portraying Coolidge after his statement.

Others saw Coolidge's message as a desire to get back to private life. As early as 1924, Coolidge decided he would not run for the presidency a second time. The death of his son, Calvin Jr., in 1924, took a heavy toll on the president, which some say led to clinical depression. "When he died, the power and the glory of the Presidency went with him", Coolidge later wrote in his autobiography. He also noted that another term would put him in the White House longer than any other man had been there, and ten years is more time than any man should spend there.

Also, Coolidge took some steps to make sure he was not drafted for the nomination. He said, "I do not approve the circulation of a petition, such as has been reported in the morning press, requesting me to run for president in 1928. I don't see that anything good could come from it. I hope it will be discontinued." He also announced in December 1927, "My statement stands. No one should be led to suppose that I have modified it. My decision will be respected." Informed that some Massachusetts Republicans were mounting a campaign to have him win their state's presidential primary, Coolidge informed the Republican state chairman "Such an action would be most embarrassing to me... I request that it not be done."

While the language was open for debate, some pointed out that it was the language of a Vermont Yankee. "The Yankee language is founded on understatement and not overstatement," said publisher Charles Thompson.

=== Honoring two-term tradition ===
Coolidge had only served a little less than half of Harding's unexpired term before winning election in his own right. Some believe that Coolidge was honoring the two-term tradition set by President George Washington, even though Coolidge held the opinion that a vice president who succeeded to part of another president's term would not violate the rule by then running twice for election in his own right. Within the Republican party, there was talk that the "no third term tradition" could damage Coolidge's, and thus the party's, chances in the 1928 election. This led to some party members calling for him not to run for a third term (or in this case, second full term), though most scholars feel their opinion had little effect on Coolidge's reasoning. Many who believed that Coolidge wanted to be reelected thought that "I do not choose to run" was a clever way for him to avoid breaking the two-term tradition by being drafted to run again.

There had only been one previous instance of a former vice president winning even one election in his own right after succeeding to the presidency, this being when Theodore Roosevelt was re-elected in 1904 after succeeding the assassinated William McKinley. However, Roosevelt had served nearly all of McKinley's second term, which may have influenced his decision not to run again in 1908, although he did run unsuccessfully in 1912 against his successor, William Howard Taft.

In 1951, the Twenty-second Amendment to the United States Constitution was ratified, thus limiting the number of times that a person can be elected president to two; a person who succeeds to the presidency and serves more than half of the unexpired term is further limited to one election in their own right. As of 2024, the amendment has yet to apply to anyone succeeding to the presidency; a grandfather clause exempted Harry S. Truman when the amendment came into force, Lyndon B. Johnson served less than half of John F. Kennedy's term when he became president after Kennedy's assassination, and Gerald R. Ford (who did serve more than half of Richard Nixon's second term) was defeated in his bid to win election to a full term. Moreover, both Truman and Johnson initially attempted to run for re-election to a second full term, only for both to abandon their respective runs for the presidency after each made a disappointing showing in the New Hampshire primary. Ultimately, Coolidge would be the last incumbent president to not seek reelection despite being eligible for another term; three subsequent incumbents initially sought reelection but eventually withdrew their bids: Truman, Johnson, and Joe Biden.

== In popular culture ==
The phrase entered popular culture of the era. The tune "I Do Not Choose to Run", credited to Kenny & Dennis was recorded in March 1928 by Harry Reser's jazz band, The Six Jumping Jacks with vocal chorus by Tom Stacks for Brunswick Records. The humorous lyrics tell the story of a watch which, rather than ticking and telling time, utters Coolidge's famous phrase.

An episode of The Many Loves of Dobie Gillis is titled "I Do Not Choose to Run". In the episode, Herbert decides to run for city planning commissioner.

An episode of The Dick Van Dyke Show is titled "I Do Not Choose to Run". In the episode, Rob Petrie chooses not to run for city council.

In an episode of Seinfeld titled "The Race", the character Jerry says, "I choose not to run" as a playful comment alluding to Coolidge's famous quote, though in the context of the episode it is in regard to an athletic race and not a political contest.

== See also ==
- Shermanesque statement — "If drafted, I will not run; if nominated, I will not accept; if elected, I will not serve."
- Withdrawal of Lyndon B. Johnson from the 1968 United States presidential election
- Withdrawal of Joe Biden from the 2024 United States presidential election

== Bibliography ==
- Coolidge, Calvin (1929). The Autobiography of Calvin Coolidge. New York: Cosmopolitan Book.
- Greenberg, David (2007). Calvin Coolidge. New York: Times. ISBN 9780805069570.
- Gilbert, Robert E. (2003). The Tormented President: Calvin Coolidge, Death, and Clinical Depression. Westport, CT: Praeger.
