= Todd Kimsey =

American actor

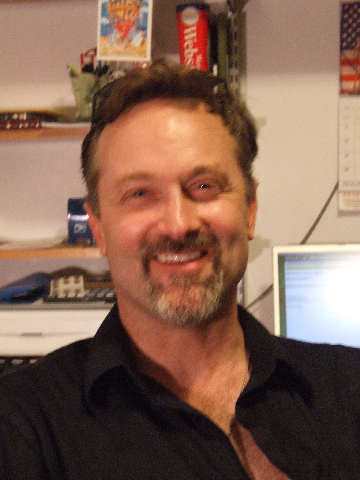
- Kimsey in 2007
- Born: Todd Grant Kimsey; June 6, 1962; Athens, Georgia, U.S.
- Died: September 16, 2016 (aged 54); Westwood, California, U.S.
- Education: Florida State University
- Occupation: Actor
- Spouse: Lisa (née Ardizzoni) Kimsey
- Children: Jackson, Judah, Kellen

Todd Grant Kimsey (June 6, 1962 – September 16, 2016) was an American film, stage and television actor. He appeared in more than forty television roles throughout his career, as well as film roles including The Perfect Storm in 2000, Planet of the Apes in 2001, and Hidalgo in 2004. However, Kimsey may be best known for guest-starring as Ned Isakoff, Elaine Benes's communist boyfriend, in "The Race", a 1994 episode of Seinfeld. Kimsey's character was later included in Rolling Stone magazine's "100 Best Seinfeld Characters" in 2014. He appeared in the Sliders episode (5/15) "To Catch a Slide" (1999).

== Biography ==
Kimsey, one of four siblings, was born to Dr. William and Linda (Grant) Kimsey on June 6, 1962, in Athens, Georgia. He graduated from Clarke Central High School in Athens in the 1980. Kimsey initially enrolled in Davidson College for two years, before transferring to Florida State University (FSU), where he earned a bachelor's degree in theater. He then interned at The Burt Reynolds Celebrity Dinner Theater, which was owned by Burt Reynolds, in Jupiter, Florida, following his graduation from FSU. Kimsey then moved to New York, where he acted off-Broadway and in severaltelevision commercials, followed by a year with the touring production of Biloxi Blues.

Kimsey eventually relocated to Los Angeles to pursue film and television. He appeared in more than forty television roles, including NCIS: Los Angeles and JAG.

Kimsey was perhaps best known for his guest starring role in the December 1994 episode of Seinfeld, The Race, during the sixth season. He plays Ned Isakoff, Elaine Benes' (Julia Louis-Dreyfus) new boyfriend, whom she discovers is a communist. In the episode, Ned, who wears olive-color clothes and reads the Daily Worker, influences Kramer (Michael Richards) with his communist ideology, leading Kramer to be fired from his job as a department store Santa Claus. Also ended up being blacklisted from a Chinese Restaurant that Elaine ordered from after she was banned. Rolling Stone magazine named Kimsey's Ned to its "100 Best Seinfeld Characters" in 2014.

Todd Kimsey died on September 16, 2016, in Westwood, California at the age of 54 following a three-and-a-half-year battle with lymphoma. He is survived by his wife, Lisa (Ardizzoni); three sons, Jackson, Judah and Kellen; his parents; and siblings, Terri (Kimsey) Langford, Tracey (Kimsey) Evans and Dr. Troy Kimsey.

== Filmography ==
| Year | Title | Role | Notes |
|---|---|---|---|
| 1987 | Galactic Gigolo | Big Peter Dick | |
| 1994 | Seinfeld | Ned Isakoff | |
| 1997 | Macon County Jail | Hobie | |
| 1997 | Diagnosis Murder S4 Ep19 | Dave Chambers | |
| 1997 | Dead Inn | Johnny Burns | |
| 2000 | Rules of Engagement | Officer #1 | |
| 2000 | The Perfect Storm | Lt. Rob Pettit | |
| 2001 | Planet of the Apes | Friend At Leo's Party #7 | |
| 2002 | Defining Maggie | Tom | |
| 2004 | Hidalgo | Corporal at Wounded Knee | |
| 2013 | Attila | | |
