= Bibliography of Herbert Hoover =

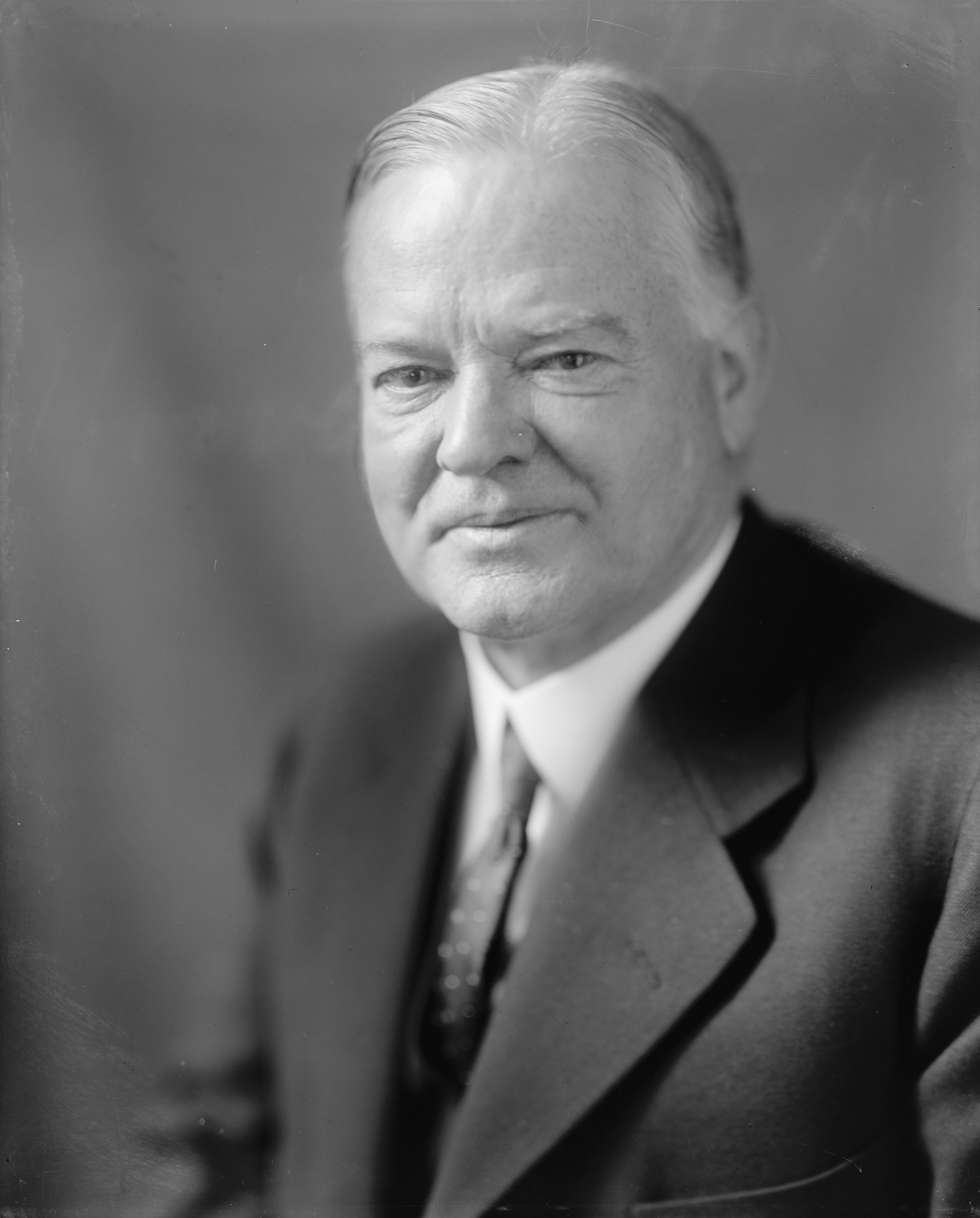
Portrait of Hoover

The following is a list of important scholarly resources related to Herbert Hoover, the 31st president of the United States. For recent work see Ellis W. Hawley (2018). For older studies see Patrick G. O’Brien and Philip T. Rosen, (1981), 25–42, 83–99 and Patrick G. O’Brien, (1988).

== Secondary sources ==
=== Biographies ===
- Best, Gary Dean. The Politics of American Individualism: Herbert Hoover in Transition, 1918–1921 (1975)
  - Best, Gary Dean. The Life of Herbert Hoover: Keeper of the Torch, 1933–1964. Palgrave Macmillan, 2013.
- Burner, David (1979). Herbert Hoover: The Public Life. Knopf Doubleday. ISBN 978-0-394-46134-2.
- Clements, Kendrick A. The Life of Herbert Hoover: Imperfect Visionary, 1918–1928 (2010).
- Edwards, Barry C. "Putting Hoover on the Map: Was the 31st President a Progressive?." Congress & the Presidency 41#1 (2014) pp 49–83
- Fausold, Martin L. (1985). The Presidency of Herbert C. Hoover. University Press of Kansas. ISBN 978-0-7006-0259-9.
- Gelfand, Lawrence E. ed. Herbert Hoover: The Great War and Its Aftermath, 1914–1923 (1979)
- Hawley, Ellis. Herbert Hoover as Secretary of Commerce: Studies in New Era Thought and Practice (1981).
- Hawley, Ellis (1989), Herbert Hoover and the Historians.
- Jeansonne, Glen. The Life of Herbert Hoover: Fighting Quaker, 1928–1933. Palgrave Macmillan; 2012.
- Jeansonne, Glen. Herbert Hoover: A Life (2016), 464pp; comprehensive scholarly biography
- Leuchtenburg, William E. (2009). Herbert Hoover. Times Books (Henry Holt and Company). ISBN 978-0-8050-6958-7.
- Leuchtenburg, William E. (Summer 2009). "The Wrong Man at the Wrong Time". American Heritage. 59 (2).
- Lloyd, Craig. Aggressive Introvert: A Study of Herbert Hoover and Public Relations Management, 1912–1932 (1973).
- Nash, George H. "The 'Great Humanitarian': Herbert Hoover, the Relief of Belgium, and the Reconstruction of Europe after War I." The Tocqueville Review 38.2 (2017): 55–70.
- Nash, George H. "An American Epic’: Herbert Hoover and Belgian Relief in World War I." Prologue Magazine 21 (1989). online
- Nash, George H. The Life of Herbert Hoover: The Engineer 1874–1914 (1983); in-depth scholarly study online.
  - ———— (1988), The Humanitarian, 1914–1917, The Life of Herbert Hoover, vol. 2.
  - ———— (1996), Master of Emergencies, 1917–1918, The Life of Herbert Hoover, vol. 3. online
- Nash, Lee, ed. Understanding Herbert Hoover: Ten Perspectives (1987); essays by scholars
- Nash, George H. (1983). The Life of Herbert Hoover: The Engineer 1874–1914. W W Norton. ISBN 978-0393016345. Book 1 in The Life of Herbert Hoover Series.
- Rappleye, Charles (2016). Herbert Hoover in the White House: The Ordeal of the Presidency. Simon & Schuster. ISBN 978-1-4516-4869-0.
- Smith, Gene. The Shattered Dream: Herbert Hoover and the Great Depression (1970)
- Smith, Richard Norton. An Uncommon Man: The Triumph of Herbert Hoover, (1987), biography concentrating on post 1932.
- Walch, Timothy. ed. Uncommon Americans: The Lives and Legacies of Herbert and Lou Henry Hoover Praeger, 2003.
- West, Hal Elliott. Hoover, The Fishing President: Portrait of the Man and his Life Outdoors (2005).
- Whyte, Kenneth. Hoover: An Extraordinary Life in Extraordinary Time (2017). 752pp excerpt
- Wilson, Joan Hoff (1975). Herbert Hoover, Forgotten Progressive. Little, Brown. ISBN 978-0-316-94416-8.

=== Scholarly studies ===
- Accinelli, Robert D. "The Hoover Administration and the World Court." Peace & Change 4.3 (1977): 28–36.
- Banholzer, Simon, and Tobias Straumann. "Why the French Said 'Non': A New Perspective on the Hoover Moratorium of June 1931." Journal of Contemporary History 56.4 (2021): 1040–1060. doi:10.1177/0022009420949924
- Barber, William J. From New Era to New Deal: Herbert Hoover, the Economists, and American Economic Policy, 1921–1933. (1985)
- Barry, John M. Rising Tide: The Great Mississippi Flood of 1927 and How It Changed America (1998), Hoover played a major role
- Brandes, Joseph. Herbert Hoover and economic diplomacy; Department of Commerce policy 1921-1928 (1962) online borrow
- Britten, Thomas A. "Hoover and the Indians: the Case for Continuity in Federal Indian Policy, 1900–1933" Historian 1999 61(3): 518–538. ISSN 0018-2370
- Cabanes, Bruno. "The hungry and the sick: Herbert Hoover, the Russian famine, and the professionalization of humanitarian aid" in Bruno Cabanes, The Great War and the Origins of Humanitarianism, 1918-1924 (Cambridge UP, 2014) 189–247.
- Calder, James D. The Origins and Development of Federal Crime Control Policy: Herbert Hoover's Initiatives Praeger, 1993
- Carcasson, Martin (Spring 1998). "Herbert Hoover and the Presidential Campaign of 1932: The Failure of Apologia". Presidential Studies Quarterly. 28 (2): 349–365. JSTOR 27551864.
- Chapman, Michael E. "Ironies of Character: Hoover's Foreign Policy with Asia." in A Companion to Warren G. Harding, Calvin Coolidge, and Herbert Hoover (2014): 502–521.
- Clements, Kendrick A. Hoover, Conservation, and Consumerism: Engineering the Good Life. University Press of Kansas, 2000
- Current, Richard N. "The Stimson Doctrine and the Hoover Doctrine." American Historical Review 59.3 (1954): 513–542. online
- DeConde, Alexander. Herbert Hoover's Latin-American policy (1951) online
- Doenecke, Justus D (1987). "Anti-Interventionism of Herbert Hoover" (PDF). Journal of Libertarian Studies. 8 (2): 311–340.
- Druelle, Clotilde. Feeding Occupied France during World War I: Herbert Hoover and the Blockade (2019)
- Eichengreen, Barry; Temin, Peter (2000). "The Gold Standard and the Great Depression" (PDF). Contemporary European History. 9 (2): 183–207. doi:10.1017/S0960777300002010. JSTOR 20081742. S2CID 158383956.
- Ellis, L. Ethan. Republican Foreign Policy, 1921-1933 (1968) online
- Fausold, Martin L. The Presidency of Herbert C. Hoover (UP of Kansas, 1985), aa major scholarly survey online
- Ferrell, Robert H. (1957). American Diplomacy in the Great Depression: Hoover–Stimson Foreign Policy, 1929–1933. Yale University Press.
- Gelfand, Lawrence E. ed. Herbert Hoover--the Great War and Its Aftermath, 1914-23 (U of Iowa Press, 1979). Eight essays by scholars. online
- George Jr, James H. "Another Chance: Herbert Hoover and World War II Relief." Diplomatic History 16.3 (1992): 389–407. online
- Goodman, Mark; Gring, Mark (2000). "The Ideological Fight over Creation of the Federal Radio Commission in 1927". Journalism History. 26 (3): 117–124. doi:10.1080/00947679.2000.12062550. S2CID 197612960.
- Hamilton, David E. From New Day to New Deal: American Farm Policy from Hoover to Roosevelt, 1928–1933. (1991)
- Hart, David M. (1998), "Herbert Hoover's Last Laugh: the Enduring Significance of the 'Associative State' in the United States", Journal of Policy History, 10 (4): 419–444, doi:10.1017/S0898030600007156, S2CID 154120555
- Hatfield, Mark, ed. Herbert Hoover Reassessed: Essays Commemorating the Fiftieth Anniversary of the Inauguration of Our Thirty-First President (US Government Printing Office, 1981). online free, major collection of 29 essays by scholars
- Hawley, Ellis (1974). "Herbert Hoover, the Commerce Secretariat, and the Vision of an 'Associative State', 1921–1928". Journal of American History. 61 (1): 116–140. doi:10.2307/1918256. JSTOR 1918256.
- Houck, Davis W (2000). "Rhetoric as Currency: Herbert Hoover and the 1929 Stock Market Crash". Rhetoric & Public Affairs. 3 (2): 155–181. doi:10.1353/rap.2010.0156. S2CID 154447214.
- Hutchison, Janet (1997). "Building for Babbitt: the State and the Suburban Home Ideal". Journal of Policy History. 9 (2): 184–210. doi:10.1017/s0898030600005923. S2CID 155048376.
- Jeansonne, Glen S. "Hoover goes to Belgium." History Today (Jan 2015) 65#1 pp 19–24. online; popular history
- Kaufman, Bruce E. (2012). "Wage Theory, New Deal Labor Policy, and the Great Depression: Were Government and Unions to Blame?". Industrial and Labor Relations Review. 65 (3): 501–532. doi:10.1177/001979391206500302. hdl:10072/48703. JSTOR 24368882. S2CID 54877676.
- Kennedy, Greg. "Depression and security: Aspects influencing the United States Navy during the Hoover administration."
- Koyoma, Kumiko. 2009. “The Passage of the Smoot-Hawley Tariff Act: Why Did the President Sign the Bill?” Journal of Policy History 21 (2): 163-86
- Kubo, Fumiaki, Ryūji Hattori, and Satoshi Hattori. "The 1930s: Japan’s War with China and American Non-Recognition." in The History of US-Japan Relations (Palgrave Macmillan, Singapore, 2017). 83–102. online
- Lichtman, Allan J. Prejudice and the Old Politics: The Presidential Election of 1928 (1979)
- Lisio, Donald J. The President and Protest: Hoover, MacArthur, and the Bonus Riot, 2d ed. (1994)
- Lisio, Donald J. Hoover, Blacks, and Lily-whites: A Study of Southern Strategies (1985)
- Lochner, Louis P. Herbert Hoover and Germany (1960) online
- McKercher, B. J. C. "'A Certain Irritation': The White House, the State Department, and the Desire for a Naval Settlement with Great Britain, 1927–1930." Diplomatic History 31.5 (2007): 829–863. online
- McPherson, Alan. "Herbert Hoover, Occupation Withdrawal, and the Good Neighbor Policy." Presidential Studies Quarterly 44.4 (2014): 623–639 online
- Malin, James C. The United States after the World War. 1930. extensive coverage of Hoover's Commerce Dept. policies
- Morison, Elting E. Turmoil and Tradition: A Study of the Life and Times of Henry L. Stimson (1960), scholarly biography online
- Myers, William Starr; Walter H. Newton, eds. The Hoover Administration; a documented narrative (1936) pp 577–618.online many documents included in the narrative.
- Nash, Lee, ed. Understanding Herbert Hoover: Ten Perspectives (1987); essays by scholars on various topics. online
- Nash, Lee, ed. Herbert Hoover and World Peace (2010)
- Olson, James S. Herbert Hoover and the Reconstruction Finance Corporation, 1931–1933 (1977)
- Parafianowicz, Halina. "Hoover's Moratorium and Some Aspects of American Policy Towards Eastern and Central Europe in 1931," American Studies. (1987) 6#1 pp 63–84.
- Robinson, Edgar Eugene and Vaughn Davis Bornet. Herbert Hoover: President of the United States. (1976)
- Romasco, Albert U. The Poverty of Abundance: Hoover, the Nation, the Depression (1965)
- Schwarz, Jordan A. The Interregnum of Despair: Hoover, Congress, and the Depression. (1970). Hostile to Hoover
- Sibley, Katherine A.S., ed. A Companion to Warren G. Harding, Calvin Coolidge, and Herbert Hoover (2014); 616pp; essays by scholars stressing historiography
- Stoff, Michael B. "Herbert Hoover: 1929–1933". The American Presidency: The Authoritative Reference. New York, New York: Houghton Mifflin Company (2004), 332–343
- Sobel, Robert Herbert Hoover and the Onset of the Great Depression 1929–1930 (1975)
- Walker III, William O. "Crucible for peace: Herbert Hoover, modernization, and economic growth in Latin America." Diplomatic History 30.1 (2006): 83–117. online jstor
- Weissman, Benjamin M. Herbert Hoover and famine relief to Soviet Russia, 1921–1923 (Hoover Institution Press, 1974).
- Wilbur, Ray Lyman, and Arthur Mastick Hyde. The Hoover Policies. (1937). In depth description of his administration by two cabinet members
- Wilson, John R. M. “Herbert Hoover’s Military Policy.” in Herbert Hoover and World Peace, ed. Lee Nash. (2010) pp 115–32.
- Wilson, John R. M. “The Quaker and the Sword: Herbert Hoover’s Relations with the Military.” Military Affairs 38#2 (1974), pp. 41–47, online.
- Wueschner, Silvano A. Charting Twentieth-Century Monetary Policy: Herbert Hoover and Benjamin Strong, 1917–1927. Greenwood, 1999

=== Historiography ===
- Extensive annotated bibliography at the University of Virginia Miller Center of Public Affairs
- Bernet, Claus (2009). "Hoover, Herbert". In Bautz, Traugott (ed.). Biographisch-Bibliographisches Kirchenlexikon (BBKL) (in German). Vol. 30. Nordhausen: Bautz. cols. 644–653. ISBN 978-3-88309-478-6.
- Braeman, John. "Power and Diplomacy: the 1920's Reappraised." The Review of Politics 44.3 (1982): 342–369.
- Dodge, Mark M., ed. Herbert Hoover and the Historians. (1989)
- Hawley, Ellis."Herbert Hoover and the Historians—Recent Developments: A Review Essay" Annals of Iowa 78#1 (2018) p. 75-86 https://doi.org/10.17077/0003-4827.12547
- O'Brien, Patrick G. “Hoover and Historians: Revisionism Since 1980,” Annals of Iowa 49#5 (1988), 394–402. online
- O'Brien, Patrick G.; Rosen, Philip T. (1981). "Hoover and the Historians: the Resurrection of a President". The Annals of Iowa. 46 (2): 83–99. doi:10.17077/0003-4827.8816.
- Tracey, Kathleen. Herbert Hoover–A Bibliography: His Writings and Addresses. (1977)

== Primary sources ==
=== Works by Hoover ===
- Principles of Mining (1909)
- Food Guide for War Service at Home Prepared under the direction of the United States Food Administration (1918)
- Preface to a report of the United States Food Administration (1920)
- American Individualism (1922)
- Hoover, Herbert Clark (1934), The Challenge to Liberty.
- American Ideals Versus the New Deal (1936)
- Hoover, Herbert Clark (1938), Addresses Upon The American Road, 1933–1938.
- Hoover, Herbert Clark (1941), Addresses Upon The American Road, 1940–41.
- Hoover, Herbert Clark; and Gibson, Hugh (1942), The Problems of Lasting Peace.
- Hoover, Herbert. Prefaces to Peace (1943)
- Hoover, Herbert Clark (1949), Addresses Upon The American Road, 1945–48.
- Hoover, Herbert Clark (1952a), Years of adventure, 1874–1920 (PDF), Memoirs, vol. 1, New York, archived from the original (PDF) on December 17, 2008.
- Hoover, Herbert Clark (1952b), The Cabinet and the Presidency, 1920–1933 (PDF), Memoirs, vol. 2, New York, archived from the original (PDF) on December 17, 2008.
- Hoover, Herbert Clark (1952c), The Great Depression, 1929–1941 (PDF), Memoirs, vol. 3, New York, archived from the original (PDF) on December 17, 2008.
- Hoover, Herbert. The Ordeal of Woodrow Wilson (1958)
- Hoover, Herbert. Herbert Hoover On Growing Up: His Letters from and to American Children (1962)
- Hoover, Herbert. Fishing for Fun: And to Wash Your Soul (1963)
- Hawley, Ellis, ed. Herbert Hoover: Containing the Public Messages, Speeches, and Statements of the President, 4 vols. (1974–1977)
- Hoover, Herbert Clark (2011), Nash, George H. (ed.), Freedom Betrayed: Herbert Hoover's Secret History of the Second World War and Its Aftermath, Stanford, CA: Hoover Institution Press, ISBN 978-0-8179-1234-5.
- Hoover, Herbert Clark (2013), Nash, George H. (ed.), The Crusade Years, 1933–1955: Herbert Hoover's Lost Memoir of the New Deal Era and Its Aftermath, Stanford, CA: Hoover Institution Press, ISBN 978-0-8179-1674-9.

=== Other primary sources ===
- Myers, William Starr; Walter H. Newton, eds. The Hoover Administration; a documented narrative. 1936.
- Miller, Dwight M.; Walch, Timothy, eds. (1998), Herbert Hoover and Franklin D. Roosevelt: A Documentary History, Contributions in American History, Westport, CT: Greenwood Press, ISBN 978-0-313-30608-2
- Mossman, Billy C.; Stark, M. W. (1971). "Chapter XXV, Former President Herbert C. Hoover, State Funeral, October 20–25, 1964". The Last Salute: Civil and Military Funeral, 1921–1969. Washington: Department of the Army. OCLC 123268063. Archived from the original on December 25, 2014.
- American Engineering Council, Committee on Elimination of Waste in Industry; Waste in Industry Federated American Engineering Societies, 1921
- Rogers, Benjamin F. “‘Dear Mr. President’: The Hoover-Truman Correspondence.” Presidential Studies Quarterly 16#3 (1986), pp. 503–10, online
- Stimson, Henry and McGeorge Bundy, On Active Service in Peace and War. (1948) (memoirs) online
